= 2023 Khakas head election =

- 8–10 September 2023
- Turnout: 39.50%
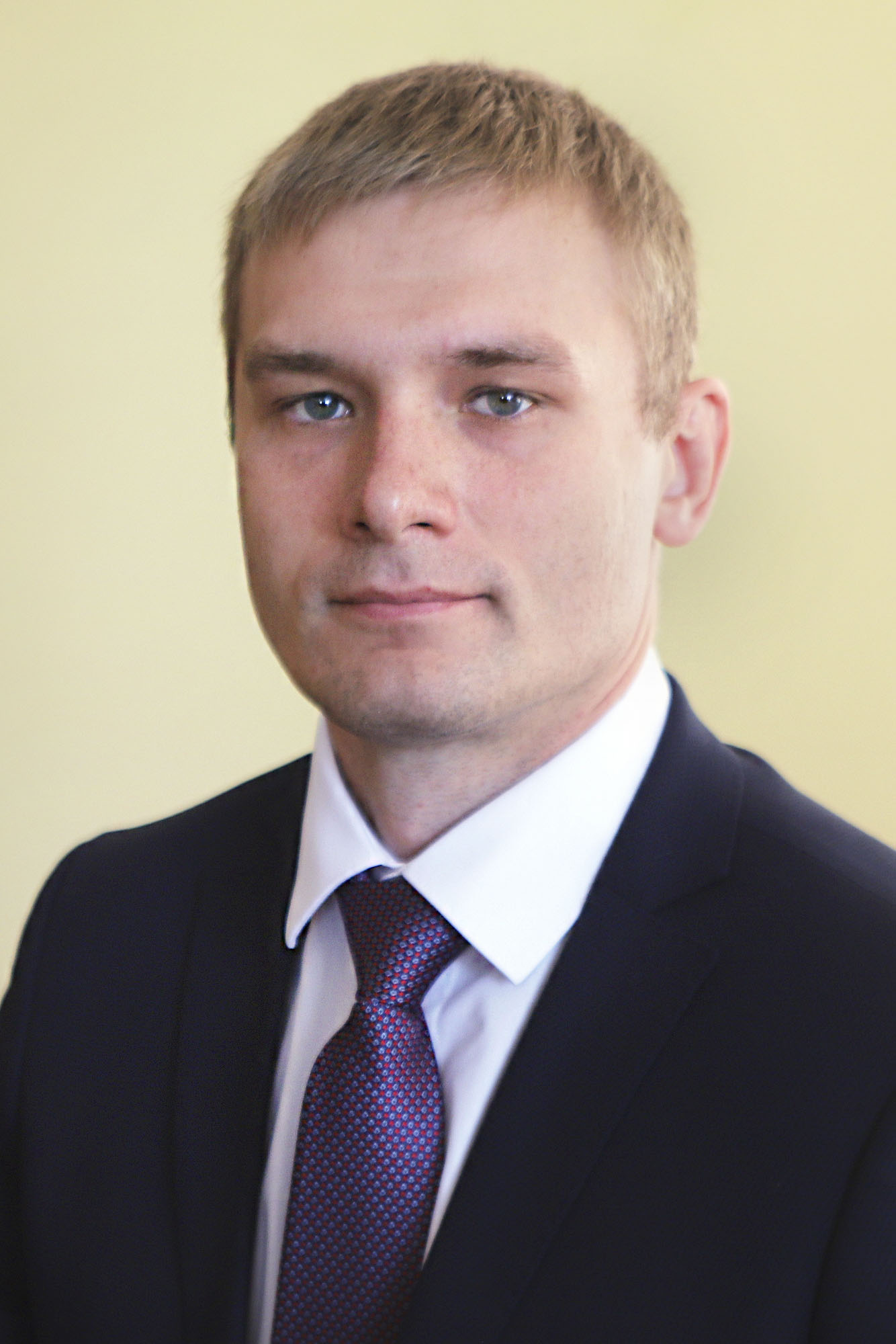

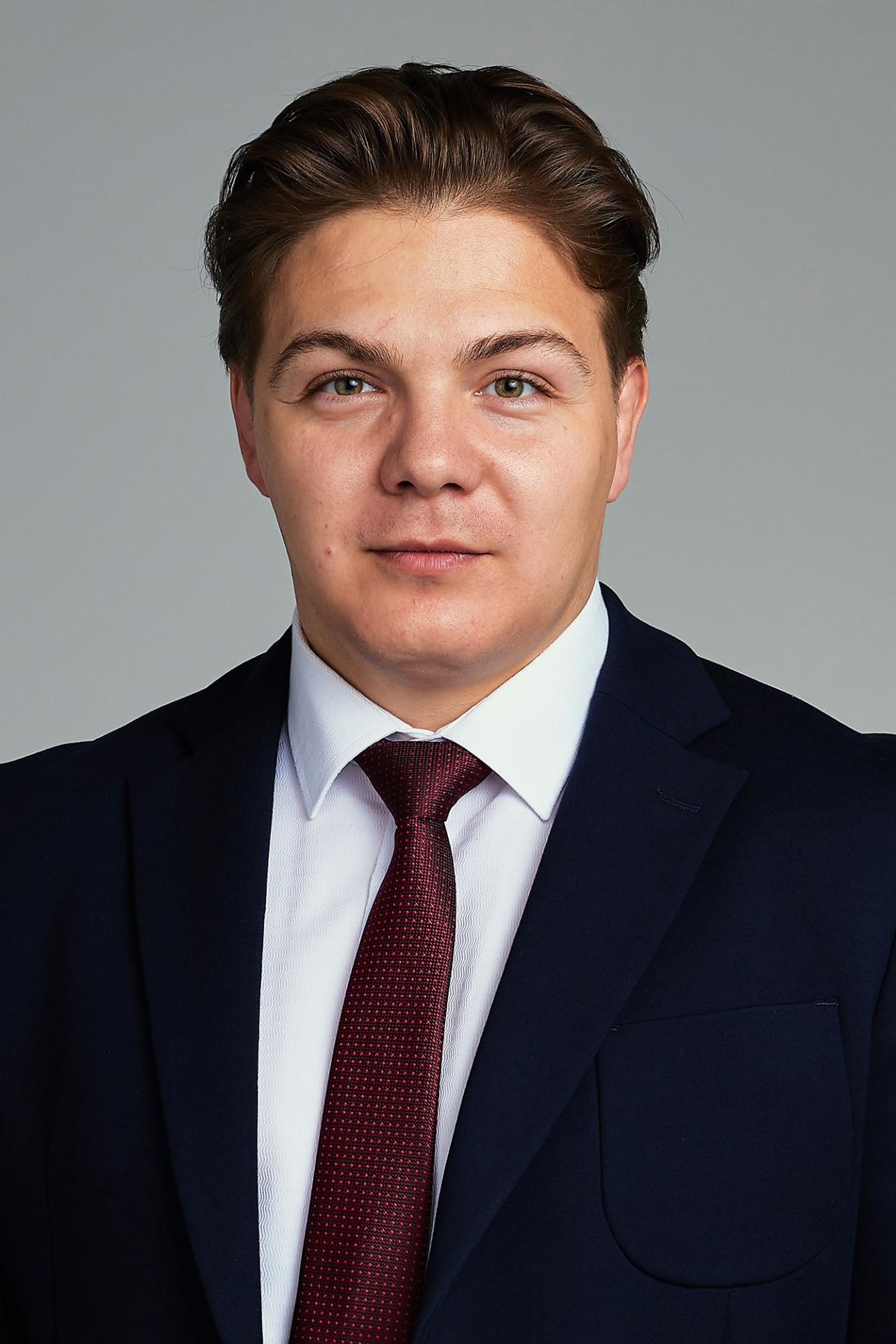
			CPCR
Candidate	Valentin Konovalov	Mikhail Molchanov	Vladimir Grudinin
Party	CPRF	LDPR	Communists of Russia
Popular vote	98,278	22,302	18,614
Percentage	63.14%	14.33%	11.96%
Head before election
Valentin Konovalov
CPRF
Head-elect
Valentin Konovalov
CPRF

The 2023 Khakassia head election took place on 8–10 September 2023, on common election day, coinciding with 2023 Khakassia Supreme Council election. Incumbent Head Valentin Konovalov was elected to a second term in office.

== Background ==
Communist Abakan City Council Member Valentin Konovalov won 44.81% and unexpectedly bested incumbent Head of the Republic of Khakassia Viktor Zimin, who took 32.42% of the vote, in September 2018. Prior to the second round all candidates, except Konovalov, withdrew, so in an unprecedented single-candidate election Valentin Konovalov was elected Head of the republic with 57.6%. At the age of 31, Konovalov also became one of the youngest governors in Russia. United Russia also lost its majority in the simultaneous Supreme Council election.

Valentin Konovalov has been regarded as an ineffective and inexperienced leader. Konovalov's administration was rocked with scandals, including problems with housing and utilities and criminal cases against republican officials. Rumours arose about Konovalov's early exit from office. Among potential variants of Konovalov's ouster was his election to the State Duma, as a result he was added to the CPRF party list for the 2021 Russian legislative election, where he was placed second in a regional group, that included Khakassia, Krasnoyarsk Krai and Tomsk Oblast. Ultimately, this never came to pass. After the election the CPRF received only one mandate in the regional group, which went to Krasnoyarsk businessman Ivan Babich.

The top candidate to replace Valentin Konovalov as Head of Khakassia is rumoured to be State Duma member Sergey Sokol. Sokol, a former Rostec executive and high-ranking government official in Krasnoyarsk Krai and Irkutsk Oblast, had never lived in Khakassia, however in the 2021 elections he successfully stood as a candidate in Khakassia constituency. In 2022 Sergey Sokol also was elected as Secretary of the United Russia Regional Office in Khakassia. In April 2023 Sokol returned to Khakassia after serving in the Russian Armed Forces since autumn 2022, and on 20 April during his visit to Abakan United Russia general secretary Andrey Turchak endorsed Sokol for the upcoming head election. The same day Sokol publicly announced his decision to run, pitting a United Russia member against sitting governor for the first time since the early 2000s.

On 21 August, Meduza reported that Sokol is likely to lose to incumbent Valentin Konovalov. United Russia's leadership have shifted from promoting Sokol as a veteran of the Russian Invasion of Ukraine, to an effective lobbyist, in an attempt to bolster his credentials. However, the Kremlin, in preparation for Sokol's loss, is planning to cancel the election citing “allegations of falsifications.” The Central Election Commission has already criticized the local election commission for misusing administrative resources in July. Sokol will reportedly be given a “compensatory post” and new elections, this time run by United Russia, will be held. However, Meduza's source in the Presidential office stated that the government would accept a Konovalov victory, only if it was by a "significant margin."

Shortly after these allegations where levied, Sergey Sokol dropped out of the race on 2 September, citing "health problems."

== Candidates ==
In Khakassia candidates for Head can be nominated only by registered political parties. Candidate for Head of the Republic of Khakassia should be a Russian citizen and at least 30 years old. Candidates for Head should not have a foreign citizenship or residence permit. Each candidate in order to be registered is required to collect at least 10% of signatures of members and heads of municipalities (126–132 signatures). Also head candidates present 3 candidacies to the Federation Council and election winner later appoints one of the presented candidates.

=== Registered ===
- Vladimir Grudinin (Communists of Russia), aerospace executive, community activist
- Valentin Konovalov (CPRF), incumbent Head of the Republic of Khakassia (2018–present)
- Mikhail Molchanov (LDPR), Member of Supreme Council of Khakassia (2022–present), aide to State Duma member Alexei Didenko

=== Withdrew after registration ===
- Sergey Sokol (United Russia), Member of State Duma (2020–present), former acting Governor of Irkutsk Oblast (2009) (withdrew on September 2, 2023 due to health issues)

=== Did not file ===
- Aleksey Khabarov (Rodina), chairman of Rodina regional office
- Olga Shirkovets (SR–ZP), Member of Supreme Council of Khakassia (1996–2000, 2009–2013, 2018–present), journalist

=== Declined ===
- Abrek Cheltygmashev (United Russia), Head of Askizsky District (2002–present) (running for Supreme Council)
- Yevgeny Cheltygmashev (United Russia), Member of Supreme Council of Khakassia (2019–present) (running for reelection)
- Andrey Filyagin (SR–ZP), Member of Supreme Council of Khakassia (2018–present), 2018 head candidate (switched to Independent, then – Communists of Russia) (running for Supreme Council)
- Aleksey Lyomin (United Russia), Mayor of Abakan (2019–present)
- Innokentiy Stryapkov, Head of Beysky District (2019–present)
- Irina Voynova (United Russia), Head of Altaysky District (2022–present), former Deputy Prime Minister of Khakassia (2018–2022) (running for Supreme Council)
- Aleksandr Zhukov (United Russia), Senator from Khakassia (2019–present) (running for reelection) (Note: in order to retain his seat in the Federation Council, incumbent Senator Zhukov must first win election to the Supreme Council to be appointed by the chamber)

=== Candidates for Federation Council ===
- Vladimir Grudinin (Communists of Russia):
  - Vladimir Kolesnikov
  - Vitaly Ivanov
  - Dmitry Solomkin
- Valentin Konovalov (CPRF):
  - Igor Mamontov, advisor to Valentin Konovalov, former head of United Russia regional office executive committee (2015–2021)
  - Valery Usatyuk, incumbent Senator from Khakassia (2018–present)
  - Oleg Zemtsov, former Member of Abakan Council of Deputies (2008–2013), lawyer
- Mikhail Molchanov (LDPR):
  - Vitaly Glebov, railroad depot employee
  - Andrey Shashev, Member of Supreme Council of Khakassia (2018–present)
  - Nikolay Vasilyev, businessman
- Sergey Sokol (United Russia):
  - Abrek Cheltygmashev, Head of Askizsky District (2002–present)
  - Sayana Kazygasheva, boxer
  - Irina Sannikova, Member of Civic Chamber of Russia (2023–present), deputy director of Khakassia Nature Reserve

== Finances ==
All sums are in rubles.

Financial Report	Source	Grudinin	Khabarov	Konovalov	Molchanov	Shirkovets	Sokol
First		500,000	0	53,000	30,000	2,000	35,000,000
Final		1,592,336	0	9,282,621	4,055,248	2,000	35,000,000

== Polls ==
Fieldwork date	Polling firm	Sokol	Konovalov	Molchanov	Grudinin	None	Undecided	Lead
2 September 2023	Sokol withdraws from the race							
30–31 August 2023	INSOMAR	41%	40%	4%	2%	1%	12%	1%

== Results ==
Summary of the 8–10 September 2023 Khakassia head election results
Candidate	Party	Votes	%
Valentin Konovalov (incumbent)	Communist Party	98,278	63.14
Mikhail Molchanov	Liberal Democratic Party	22,302	14.33
Vladimir Grudinin	Communists of Russia	18,614	11.96
Valid votes		139,194	89.43
Blank ballots		16,451	10.57
Total		155,653	100.00
Turnout		155,653	39.50
Registered voters		394,074	100.00

Konovalov appointed lawyer Oleg Zemtsov (Independent) to the Federation Council, replacing incumbent Valery Usatyuk (CPRF).

== See also ==
- 2023 Russian regional elections
