= 2023 Khakassia Supreme Council election =

- 8–10 September 2023
- Turnout: 39.52%
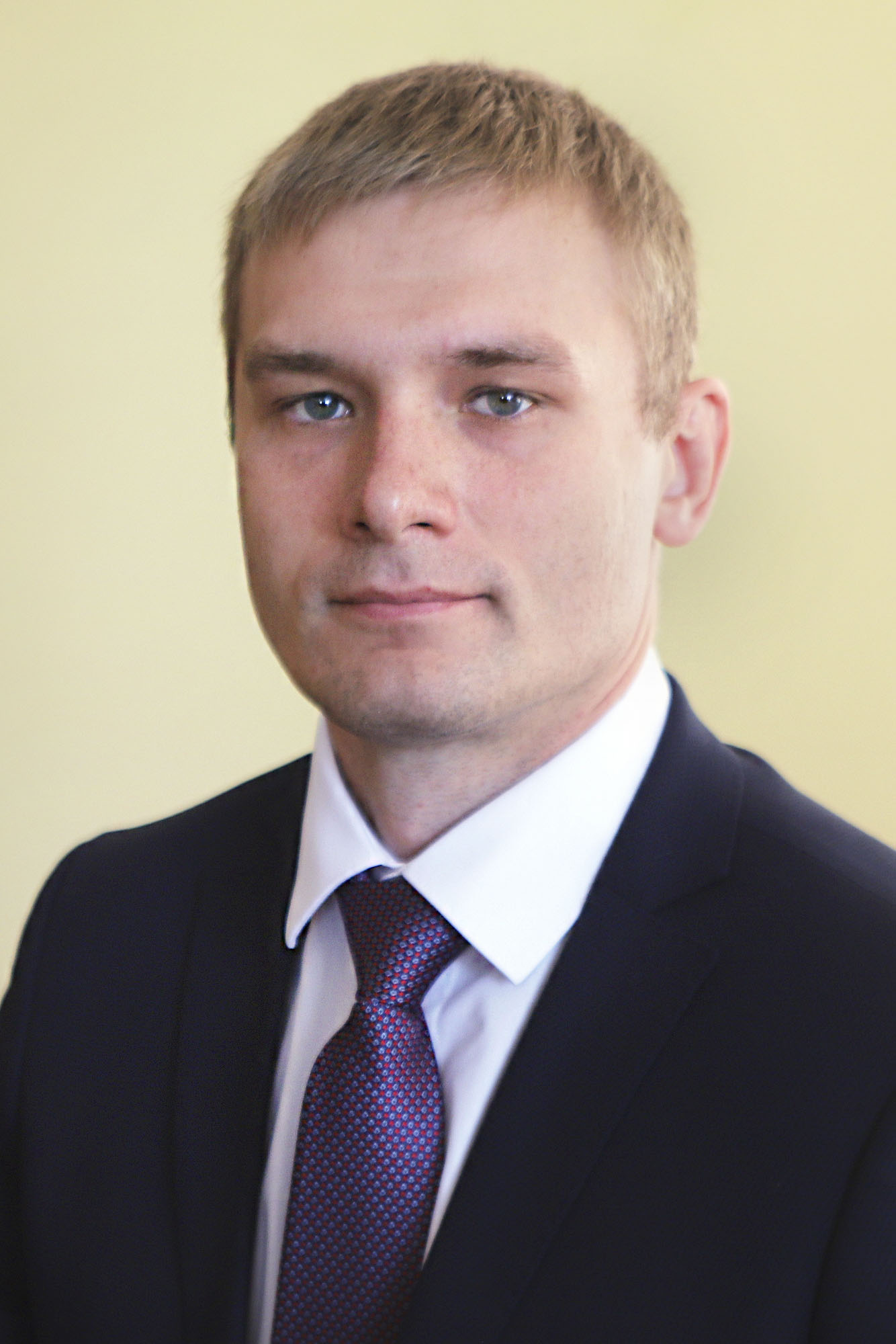

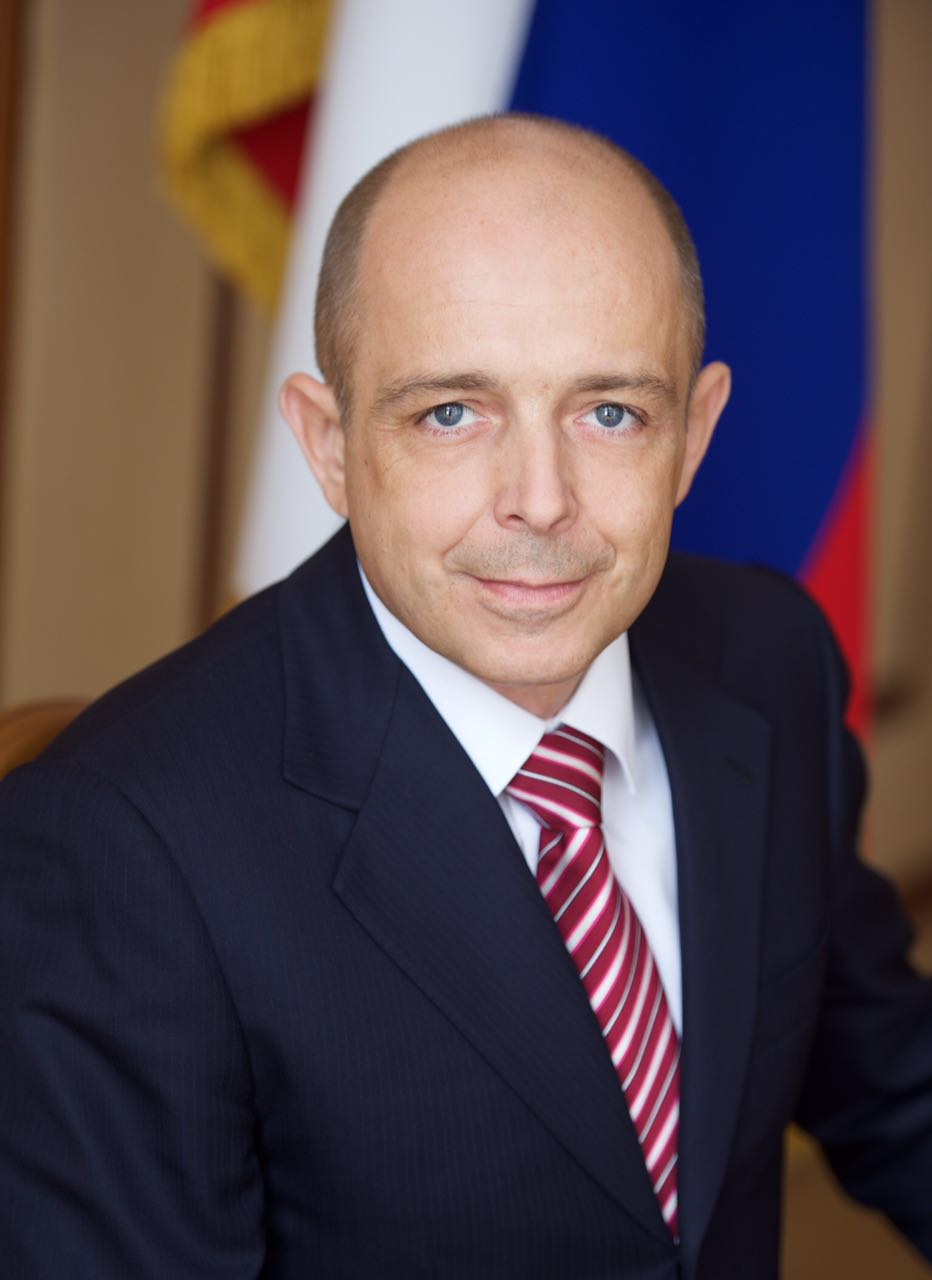

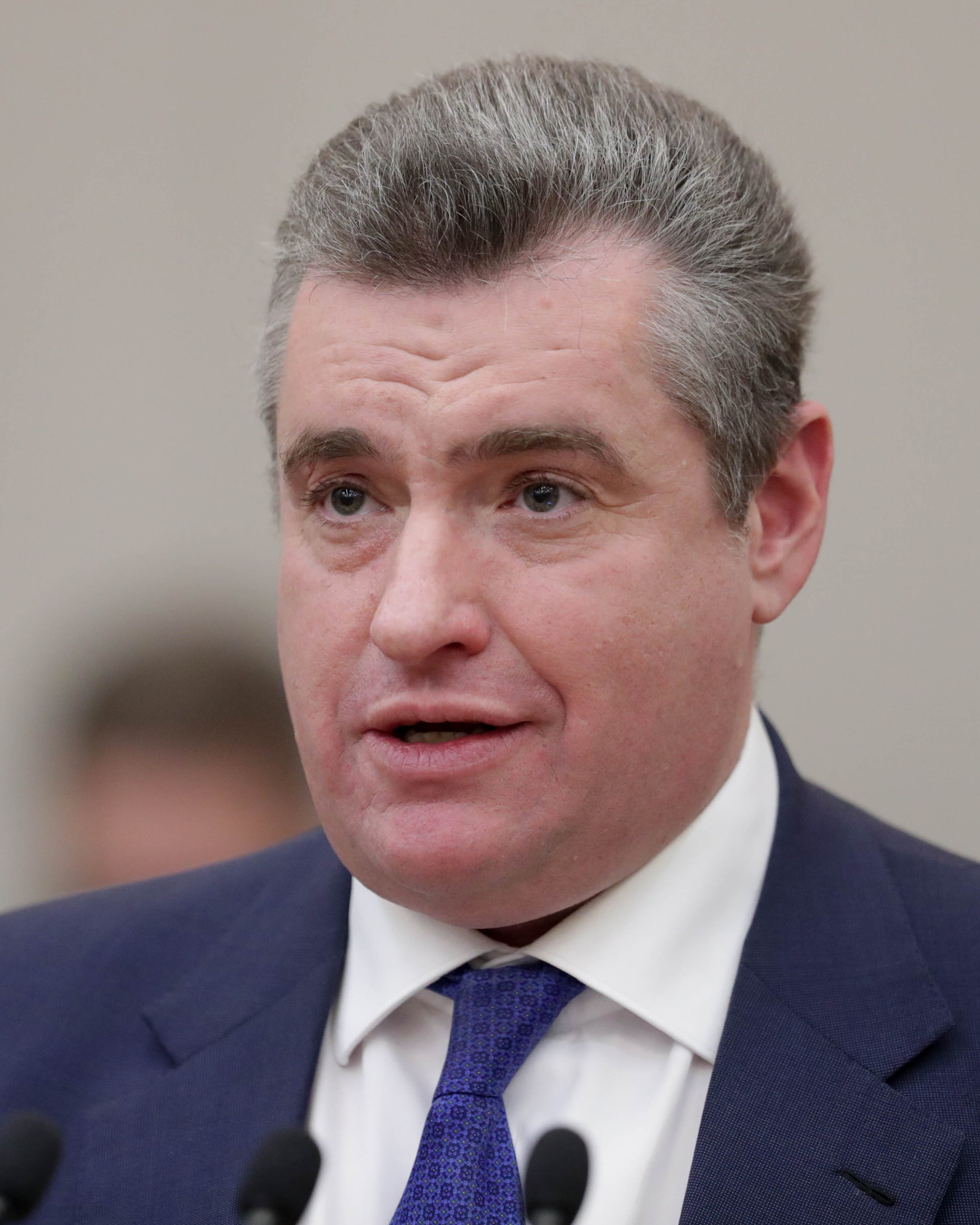

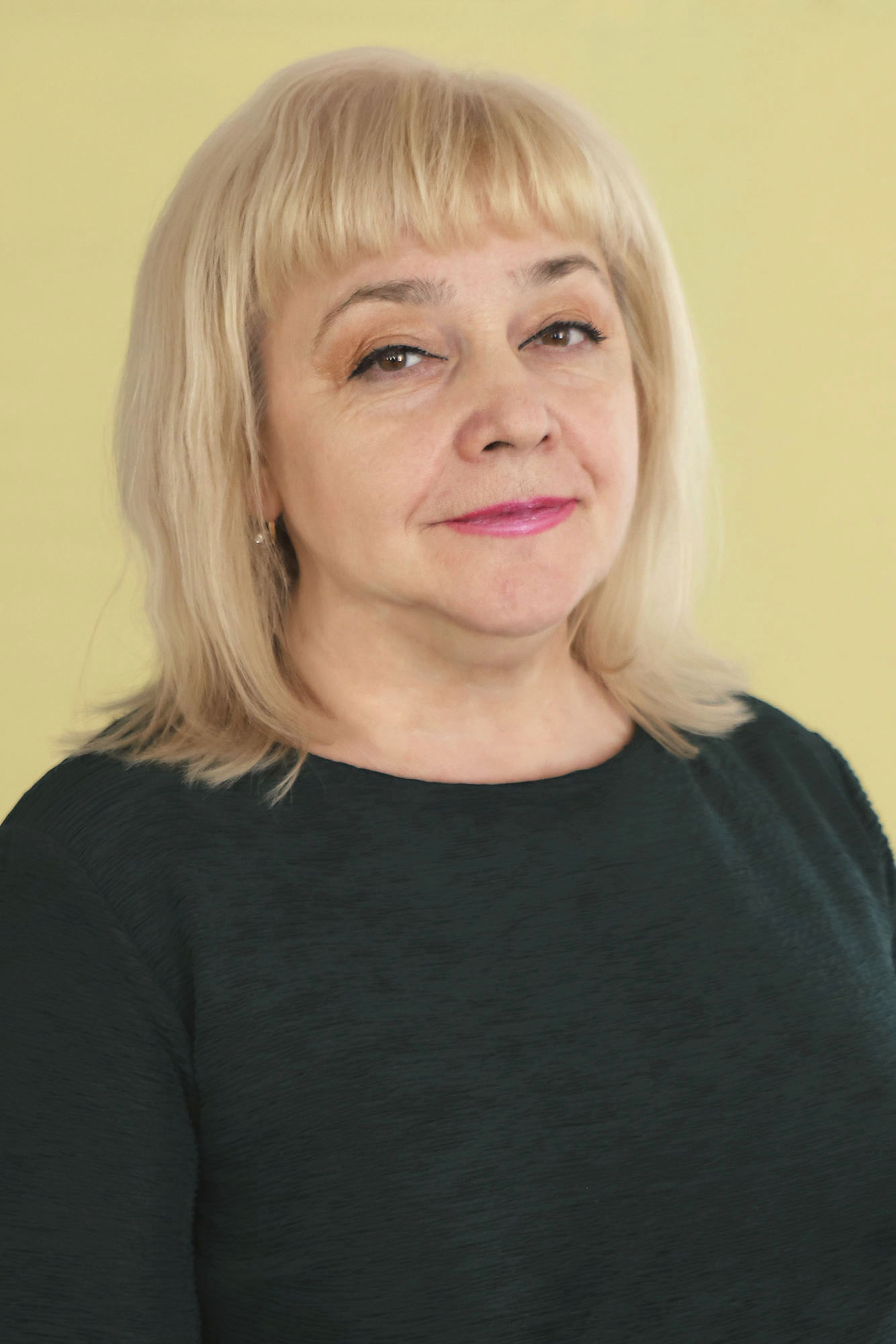
	Majority party	Minority party	Third party
Candidate	Valentin Konovalov	Sergey Sokol	Leonid Slutsky
Leader	Gennady Zyuganov	Dmitry Medvedev	Leonid Slutsky
Party	CPRF	United Russia	LDPR
Last election	16 seats, 31.01%	17 seats, 25.46%	9 seats, 20.97%
Seats won	14	34	2
Seat change	▼2	▲17	▼7
Popular vote	60,883	56,674	11,158
Percentage	39.11%	36.41%	7.17%
Swing	▲8.10%	▲10.95%	▼13.80%
	Fourth party	Fifth party	Sixth party
	NL		RPPSS
Candidate	Ivan Misyuk	Olga Shirkovets	Vladimir Serebryakov
Leader	Aleksey Nechayev	Sergey Mironov	Vladimir Burakov
Party	New People	SR-ZP	Party of Pensioners
Last election	Did not exist	2 seats, 7.09%	1 seat
Seats won	0	0	0
Seat change	Did not exist	▼2	▼1
Popular vote	6,210	5,176	4,933
Percentage	3.99%	3.33%	3.17%
Swing	Did not exist	▼3.76%	Did not participate

The 2023 Supreme Council of the Republic of Khakassia election took place on 8–10 September 2023, on common election day, coinciding with 2023 Khakassia head election. All 50 seats in the Supreme Council were up for reelection.

== Electoral system ==
Under current election laws, the Supreme Council is elected for a term of five years, with parallel voting. 25 seats are elected by party-list proportional representation with a 5% electoral threshold, with the other half elected in 25 single-member constituencies by first-past-the-post voting. Seats in the proportional part are allocated using the Imperiali quota, modified to ensure that every party list, which passes the threshold, receives at least one mandate.

== Candidates ==
=== Party lists ===
To register regional lists of candidates, parties need to collect 0.5% of signatures of all registered voters in Khakassia.

The following parties were relieved from the necessity to collect signatures:

- United Russia
- Communist Party of the Russian Federation
- A Just Russia — Patriots — For Truth
- Liberal Democratic Party of Russia
- New People
- Communists of Russia
- Russian Party of Pensioners for Social Justice

No.	Party	Republic-wide list	Candidates	Territorial groups	Status
1	New People	Ivan Misyuk • Aleksey Ruzaykin	51	18	Registered
2	Communist Party	Valentin Konovalov • Vladimir Shtygashev • Oleg Ivanov • Oleg Zemtsov	83	25	Registered
3	United Russia	Sergey Sokol • Abrek Cheltygmashev • Tatyana Krasnova	100	25	Registered
4	A Just Russia – For Truth	Olga Shirkovets • Aleksandr Slichny • Natalya Kazantseva • Yury Beloglazov • Nadezhda Kiseleva	41	18	Registered
5	Party of Pensioners	Vladimir Serebryakov • Vladimir Chebodayev • Andrey Tolstukhin	48	25	Registered
6	Liberal Democratic Party	Leonid Slutsky • Mikhail Molchanov • Yaroslav Khavron	67	25	Registered
7	Communists of Russia	Denis Brazauskas • Aleksey Kicheyev • Vladimir Grudinin • Aleksandr Shoyev • Anna Sukhikh	76	25	Registered
	Party for Fairness!	Vyacheslav Tutatchikov • Sergey Privalov • Ruslan Khachayev • Aleksandr Milyutin • Anatoly Sultrekov	54	20	Failed to qualify

New People and Russian Party of Pensioners for Social Justice will take part in Khakas legislative election for the first time since last election. Patriots of Russia, who participated in the last election, had been dissolved prior.

=== Single-mandate constituencies ===
25 single-mandate constituencies were formed in Khakassia. To register candidates in single-mandate constituencies need to collect 3% of signatures of registered voters in the constituency.

Number of candidates in single-mandate constituencies
Party	Candidates	
Party	Nominated	Registered
Communist Party	23	21
United Russia	24	24
Liberal Democratic Party	25	23
Communists of Russia	18	18
A Just Russia — For Truth	20	16
Party of Pensioners	9	8
New People	9	9
Party for Fairness!	13	0
Rodina	2	0
Independent	7	1
Total	150	120

== Results ==
=== Results by party lists ===
Summary of the 8–10 September 2023 Supreme Council of the Republic of Khakassia election results
Party	Party list					Constituency		Total	
Party	Votes	%	±pp	Seats	+/–	Seats	+/–	Seats	+/–
Communist Party	60,833	39.11	▲8.10%	12	▲4	2	▼6	14	▼2
United Russia	56,674	36.41	▲10.95%	11	▲4	23	▲13	34	▲17
Liberal Democratic Party	11,158	7.17	▼13.80%	2	▼4	0	▼3	2	▼7
New People	6,210	3.99	New	0	New	0	New	0	New
A Just Russia — For Truth	5,176	3.33	▼3.76%	0	▼2	0	Steady	0	▼2
Party of Pensioners	4,933	3.17	New	0	New	0	▼1	0	▼1
Communists of Russia	4,437	2.85	▼5.16%	0	▼2	0	Steady	0	▼2
Independents	—	—	—	—	—	0	▼2	0	▼2
Invalid ballots	6,182	3.97	▼1.71%	—	—	—	—	—	—
Total	155,659	100.00	—	25	Steady	25	Steady	50	Steady
Turnout	155,659	39.52	▼2.33%	—	—	—	—	—	—
Registered voters	393,874	100.00	—	—	—	—	—	—	—

State Duma member and withdrawn 2023 head election candidate Sergey Sokol (United Russia) was elected Chairman of the Supreme Council, replacing Vladimir Shtygashev (CPRF / Independent), who led the chamber since 1992. Incumbent Senator Alexander Zhukov (United Russia) was re-appointed to the Federation Council, despite earlier being elected United Russia faction leader.

=== Results in single-member constituencies ===
==== District 1 ====
Summary of the 8–10 September 2023 Supreme Council of the Republic of Khakassia election in District 1
Candidate	Party	Votes	%
Lyubov Cherchinskaya	United Russia	2,065	42.14%
Oleg Golovchenko	Communists of Russia	919	18.76%
Nikolay Vasilyev	Liberal Democratic Party	759	15.49%
Tsyren Dimchikov	Party of Pensioners	534	10.90%
Total		4,900	100%

==== District 2 ====
Summary of the 8–10 September 2023 Supreme Council of the Republic of Khakassia election in District 2
Candidate	Party	Votes	%
Valery Markov	United Russia	2,391	38.18%
Aleksandr Semenov	Communist Party	1,590	25.39%
Olga Kulinich	A Just Russia — For Truth	553	8.83%
Oleg Zolotarev	New People	493	7.87%
Dmitry Semenov	Communists of Russia	336	5.36%
Yaroslav Khavron	Liberal Democratic Party	298	4.76%
Total		6,263	100%

==== District 3 ====
Summary of the 8–10 September 2023 Supreme Council of the Republic of Khakassia election in District 3
Candidate	Party	Votes	%
Aleksandr Petruk	United Russia	2,006	30.62%
Galina Kozhevnikova (incumbent)	Communist Party	1,615	24.65%
Andrey Kicheyev	Communists of Russia	870	13.28%
Vitaly Glebov	Liberal Democratic Party	751	11.46%
Natalya Lavrova	New People	397	6.06%
Andrey Tolstukhin	Party of Pensioners	266	4.06%
Vladimir Yakovchuk	A Just Russia — For Truth	205	3.13%
Total		6,551	100%

==== District 4 ====
Summary of the 8–10 September 2023 Supreme Council of the Republic of Khakassia election in District 4
Candidate	Party	Votes	%
Larisa Yefimenko-Mikhaylova	United Russia	1,862	33.18%
Aleksey Kulsha	Communist Party	1,165	20.76%
Nina Maynagasheva	A Just Russia — For Truth	912	16.25%
Ivan Kukartsev	Communists of Russia	572	10.19%
Vladimir Serebryakov	Party of Pensioners	398	7.09%
Vitaly Larionov	Liberal Democratic Party	262	4.67%
Total		5,611	100%

==== District 5 ====
Summary of the 8–10 September 2023 Supreme Council of the Republic of Khakassia election in District 5
Candidate	Party	Votes	%
Aleksey Tikhonovich (incumbent)	United Russia	1,893	33.64%
Anastasia Mokh	Communist Party	1,457	25.89%
Andrey Filyagin	Communists of Russia	672	11.94%
Aleksey Vernigorov	Liberal Democratic Party	386	6.86%
Grigory Teplyashin	Party of Pensioners	346	6.15%
Tatyana Yermakova	A Just Russia — For Truth	5,628	
Total		5,628	100%

==== District 6 ====
Summary of the 8–10 September 2023 Supreme Council of the Republic of Khakassia election in District 6
Candidate	Party	Votes	%
Andrey Aleyev	United Russia	1,981	29.20%
Aleksandr Slichny	A Just Russia — For Truth	1,555	22.92%
Anna Sukhikh	Communists of Russia	1,211	17.85%
Viktor Menzhurenko	Party of Pensioners	804	11.85%
Vitaly Maleyev	Liberal Democratic Party	637	9.39%
Total		6,784	100%

==== District 7 ====
Summary of the 8–10 September 2023 Supreme Council of the Republic of Khakassia election in District 7
Candidate	Party	Votes	%
Oleg Gavlovsky	United Russia	2,423	36.73%
Dmitry Mikhin	Communist Party	1,645	24.94%
Vyacheslav Lapaukh	A Just Russia — For Truth	1,205	18.27%
Akay Albychakov	Liberal Democratic Party	808	12.25%
Total		6,597	100%

==== District 8 ====
Summary of the 8–10 September 2023 Supreme Council of the Republic of Khakassia election in District 8
Candidate	Party	Votes	%
Oleg Ivanov (incumbent)	Communist Party	2,234	40.94%
Yekaterina Seryakova	United Russia	1,868	34.23%
Vladimir Kostychakov	Communists of Russia	371	6.80%
Aleksey Popov	Liberal Democratic Party	346	6.34%
Denis Roshchin	A Just Russia — For Truth	159	2.91%
Total		5,457	100%

==== District 9 ====
Summary of the 8–10 September 2023 Supreme Council of the Republic of Khakassia election in District 9
Candidate	Party	Votes	%
Vitaly Mikheyev	United Russia	3,036	57.13%
Vladimir Shtygashev	Communist Party	1,702	32.03%
Igor Chernook	Communists of Russia	133	2.50%
Roman Kadutsky	Liberal Democratic Party	118	2.22%
Total		5,457	100%

==== District 10 ====
Summary of the 8–10 September 2023 Supreme Council of the Republic of Khakassia election in District 10
Candidate	Party	Votes	%
Yevgeny Shcherbakov	United Russia	3,150	54.50%
Vitaly Anisimov	Liberal Democratic Party	947	16.38%
Natalya Kazantseva (incumbent)	A Just Russia — For Truth	694	12.01%
Anastasia Spirina	Communists of Russia	619	10.71%
Total		5,457	100%

==== District 11 ====
Summary of the 8–10 September 2023 Supreme Council of the Republic of Khakassia election in District 11
Candidate	Party	Votes	%
Leonid Bykov	United Russia	3,088	46.30%
Grigory Nazarenko	Communist Party	2,147	32.19%
Oksana Provotorova	Liberal Democratic Party	605	9.07%
Yulia Reshetnyak	Communists of Russia	403	6.04%
Total		6,669	100%

==== District 12 ====
Summary of the 8–10 September 2023 Supreme Council of the Republic of Khakassia election in District 12
Candidate	Party	Votes	%
Olga Gorodkova	United Russia	3,286	51.29%
Natalya Engelman	Communist Party	1,753	27.36%
Roman Ivanov	Liberal Democratic Party	519	8.10%
Aleksandr Rodikov	A Just Russia — For Truth	266	4.15%
Mikhail Nefedov	Communists of Russia	231	3.61%
Total		6,407	100%

==== District 13 ====
Summary of the 8–10 September 2023 Supreme Council of the Republic of Khakassia election in District 13
Candidate	Party	Votes	%
Aleksandr Masalov (incumbent)	United Russia	2,647	49.45%
Margarita Klimova	Communists of Russia	896	16.74%
Valery Safonov	Communist Party	896	16.74%
Marina Langolf	Liberal Democratic Party	564	10.54%
Total		5,353	100%

==== District 14 ====
Summary of the 8–10 September 2023 Supreme Council of the Republic of Khakassia election in District 14
Candidate	Party	Votes	%
Gennady Shapovalenko (incumbent)	United Russia	2,624	47.25%
Andrey Kondratyev	Communist Party	824	14.84%
Nadezhda Kiseleva	A Just Russia — For Truth	659	11.87%
Nikita Ratakhin	Liberal Democratic Party	579	10.43%
Ivan Misyuk	New People	506	9.11%
Total		5,553	100%

==== District 15 ====
Summary of the 8–10 September 2023 Supreme Council of the Republic of Khakassia election in District 15
Candidate	Party	Votes	%
Vyacheslav Leskov	United Russia	2,056	36.75%
Yevgeny Molostov (incumbent)	Communist Party	1,413	25.25%
Ivan Misyuk	New People	749	13.39%
Svetlana Bulatova	Communists of Russia	515	9.20%
Nikita Kornev	Liberal Democratic Party	329	5.88%
Dmitry Samsonov	A Just Russia — For Truth	163	2.91%
Total		5,595	100%

==== District 16 ====
Summary of the 8–10 September 2023 Supreme Council of the Republic of Khakassia election in District 16
Candidate	Party	Votes	%
Nikita Berger	United Russia	1,739	29.71%
Vladimir Grudinin	Communists of Russia	1,271	21.71%
Oleg Pustoshilov	Communist Party	980	16.74%
Aleksey Ruzaykin	New People	751	12.83%
Sergey Borovik	Liberal Democratic Party	544	9.29%
Total		5,854	100%

==== District 17 ====
Summary of the 8–10 September 2023 Supreme Council of the Republic of Khakassia election in District 17
Candidate	Party	Votes	%
Denis Filatov	United Russia	3,119	40.01%
Anatoly Aleksenko	Communist Party	2,210	28.35%
Yury Beloglazov	A Just Russia — For Truth	831	10.66%
Ilya Trepov	New People	821	10.53%
Vyacheslav Churbanov	Liberal Democratic Party	342	4.39%
Total		7,796	100%

==== District 18 ====
Summary of the 8–10 September 2023 Supreme Council of the Republic of Khakassia election in District 18
Candidate	Party	Votes	%
Galina Yelistratova	United Russia	1,625	30.80%
Galina Novikova	Communist Party	1,313	24.89%
Vladimir Chebodayev	Party of Pensioners	1,086	20.58%
Vladislav Fedorov	Communists of Russia	396	7.51%
Galina Bazhenova	Liberal Democratic Party	325	6.16%
Dmitry Kochelorov	A Just Russia — For Truth	265	5.02%
Total		5,276	100%

==== District 19 ====
Summary of the 8–10 September 2023 Supreme Council of the Republic of Khakassia election in District 19
Candidate	Party	Votes	%
Roman Cheltygmashev	United Russia	3,240	48.31%
Aleksandr Miyagashev	Communist Party	1,390	20.72%
Yury Cheltygmashev	New People	909	13.55%
Pavel Korovin	Liberal Democratic Party	782	11.66%
Total		6,707	100%

==== District 20 ====
Summary of the 8–10 September 2023 Supreme Council of the Republic of Khakassia election in District 20
Candidate	Party	Votes	%
Aleksey Lyamkin	United Russia	2,824	45.79%
Tayir Achitayev	Communist Party	1,490	24.16%
Viktor Shulberekov	New People	530	8.59%
Nikolay Razumov	Communists of Russia	498	8.08%
Vladimir Pilyugin	Liberal Democratic Party	438	7.10%
Total		6,167	100%

==== District 21 ====
Summary of the 8–10 September 2023 Supreme Council of the Republic of Khakassia election in District 21
Candidate	Party	Votes	%
Yevgeny Baykalov	United Russia	2,924	43.65%
Aleksandr Zemlyakov	Communist Party	1,335	19.93%
Denis Brazauskas	Communists of Russia	1,132	16.90%
Valeria Shtil	Liberal Democratic Party	450	6.72%
Anatoly Karabontsev	A Just Russia — For Truth	428	6.39%
Total		6,699	100%

==== District 22 ====
Summary of the 8–10 September 2023 Supreme Council of the Republic of Khakassia election in District 22
Candidate	Party	Votes	%
Ivan Vagner	United Russia	2,643	41.53%
Svetlana Vashkevich	A Just Russia — For Truth	1,687	26.51%
Igor Fedorov	Liberal Democratic Party	1,542	24.23%
Total		6,364	100%

==== District 23 ====
Summary of the 8–10 September 2023 Supreme Council of the Republic of Khakassia election in District 23
Candidate	Party	Votes	%
Yevgeny Cheltygmashev (incumbent)	United Russia	3,559	54.17%
Vasily Shulbayev (incumbent)	Communist Party	2,111	32.13%
Yevgeny Safyanov	Party of Pensioners	389	5.92%
Aleksandr Tormozakov	New People	328	4.99%
Total		6,570	100%

==== District 24 ====
Summary of the 8–10 September 2023 Supreme Council of the Republic of Khakassia election in District 24
Candidate	Party	Votes	%
Valery Starostin (incumbent)	Communist Party	3,211	43.32%
Yury Borodkin	Independent	2,223	29.99%
Artyom Krytsin	Liberal Democratic Party	614	8.28%
Nina Leontenko	Party of Pensioners	489	6.60%
Vladislav Zaretsky	Communists of Russia	237	3.20%
Ivan Maksimov	A Just Russia — For Truth	181	2.44%
Total		7,413	100%

==== District 25 ====
Summary of the 8–10 September 2023 Supreme Council of the Republic of Khakassia election in District 25
Candidate	Party	Votes	%
Vladimir Sannikov (incumbent)	United Russia	2,817	52.17%
Yevgenia Khomyagina	Communist Party	2,215	41.02%
Total		5,400	100%

== See also ==
- 2023 Russian regional elections
