= Khakassia constituency =

Russian legislative constituency

Khakassia single-member constituency
- Constituency of the Russian State Duma

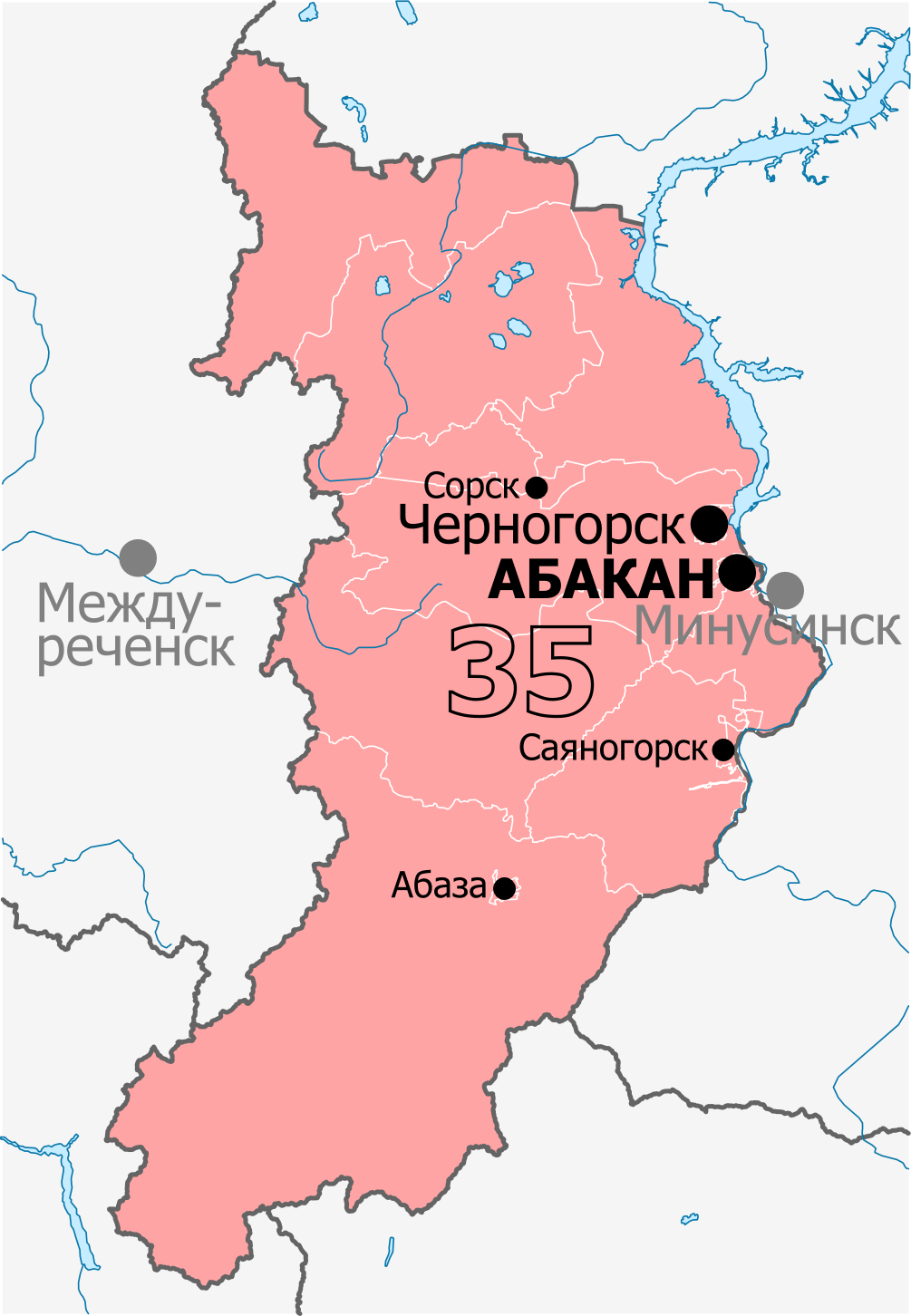
- Deputy: Aleksandr Shtygashev; United Russia
- Federal subject: Republic of Khakassia
- Districts: Abakan, Abaza, Altaysky, Askizsky, Beysky, Bogradsky, Chernogorsk, Ordzhonikidzevsky, Sayanogorsk, Shirinsky, Sorsk, Tashtypsky, Ust-Abakansky
- Voters: 386,838 (2026)

The Khakassia constituency (No.40 (Note: No.31 in 1993-1995 and 2003-2007, No.30 in 1995-2003, No.35 in 2016–2026)) is a Russian legislative constituency in Khakassia. The constituency encompasses the entire territory of Khakassia.

The constituency has been represented since 2026 by United Russia deputy Aleksandr Shtygashev, former En+ Group executive and grandson of former Supreme Council of the Republic of Khakassia chairman Vladimir Shtygashev, who won the open seat after one-term United Russia incumbent Nikolay Shulginov successfully sought re-election on the party list.

== Boundaries ==
1993–2007, 2016–present: Abakan, Abaza, Altaysky District, Askizsky District, Beysky District, Bogradsky District, Chernogorsk, Ordzhonikidzevsky District, Sayanogorsk, Shirinsky District, Sorsk, Tashtypsky District, Ust-Abakansky District
The constituency has been covering the entirety of Khakassia since its initial creation in 1993.

== Members elected ==
Election	Member	Party
1993	Mikhail Mityukov	Choice of Russia
1995	Aleksey Lebed (Note: elected Head of the Republic of Khakassia in January 1997)	Independent
1997	Georgy Maytakov	Independent
1999	Georgy Maytakov	Independent
2003	Gennady Semigin	Communist Party
2007	Proportional representation - no election by constituency	
2011	Proportional representation - no election by constituency	
2016	Nadezhda Maksimova	United Russia
2021	Sergey Sokol (Note: elected to the Supreme Council of the Republic of Khakassia in September 2023)	United Russia
2024	Nikolay Shulginov	Independent
2026	Aleksandr Shtygashev	United Russia

== Election results ==
=== 1993 ===
==== Declared candidates ====
- Mikhail Mityukov (Choice of Russia), First Deputy Minister of Justice of Russia (1993–present), former People's Deputy of Russia (1990–1993)
- Vladimir Ryzhov (Civic Union), construction businessman

==== Results ====
Summary of the 12 December 1993 Russian legislative election in the Khakassia constituency
Candidate	Party	Votes	%
Mikhail Mityukov	Choice of Russia	74,100	42.18%
Vladimir Ryzhov	Civic Union	–	32.40%
Total		175,696	100%

=== 1995 ===
==== Declared candidates ====
- Nadezhda Balakhchina (Independent), First Deputy Minister of Education of Khakassia (1992–present)
- Aleksey Lebed (Independent), military base commander, VDV colonel
- Mikhail Mityukov (DVR–OD), First Deputy Chairman of the State Duma (1994–present), incumbent Member of State Duma (1994–present)
- Viktor Nosov (CPRF), attorney, former prosecutor
- Yury Prokopyev (LDPR), industrial executive
- Arkady Roitstein (Independent), Member of Supreme Council of the Republic of Khakassia (1992–present), Chief of the Krasnoyarsk Railway Abakan Division
- Aleksandr Samsonov (Independent), traumatologist
- Sergey Sinelnikov (BIR), nonprofit chairman, retired Soviet Army podpolkovnik
- Grigory Tarkhanov (Independent), businessman, sobriety activist

==== Results ====
Summary of the 17 December 1995 Russian legislative election in the Khakassia constituency
Candidate	Party	Votes	%
Aleksey Lebed	Independent	49,703	22.42%
Nadezhda Balakhchina	Independent	38,355	17.30%
Mikhail Mityukov (incumbent)	Democratic Choice of Russia – United Democrats	31,964	14.42%
Arkady Roitshtein	Independent	31,358	14.14%
Viktor Nosov	Communist Party	29,885	13.48%
Sergey Sinelnikov	Ivan Rybkin Bloc	6,288	2.84%
Grigory Tarkhanov	Independent	6,100	2.75%
Yury Prokopyev	Liberal Democratic Party	5,467	2.47%
Aleksandr Samsonov	Independent	5,171	2.33%
against all		12,194	5.50%
Total		221,726	100%

=== 1997 (June) ===
Results of the June 1 by-election were annulled due to low turnout (22.22%). Another by-election was scheduled for October 1997.

==== Declared candidates ====
- Gennady Azanov (Independent), journalist
- Tatyana Batukhtina (Independent)
- Vladimir Burakov (Independent)
- Nikolay Charkov (Independent), painter
- Sergey Fomintsev (Independent), nonprofit president
- Sergey Gorshkov (Independent), Member of Supreme Council of the Republic of Khakassia (1992–present), engineer
- Sergey Ivanov (Independent)
- Valery Lushnikov (Independent), chemistry professor
- Georgy Maytakov (Independent), Envoy of Khakassia to Primorsky Krai (1994–present), retired Russian Navy captain 1st rank
- Nikolay Medvedev (Independent), Member of Supreme Council of the Republic of Khakassia (1997–present)
- Vyacheslav Moskvitin (Independent), Member of Supreme Council of the Republic of Khakassia (1997–present), businessman
- Viktor Panyushkin (Independent), businessman
- Yekaterina Shipova (Independent)
- Olga Shirkovets (Independent), Member of Supreme Council of the Republic of Khakassia (1997–present), journalist
- Aleksandr Yerbyagin (Independent), former Member of Supreme Council of the Republic of Khakassia (1992–1996)

==== Withdrawn candidates ====
- Veniamin Striga (Independent), Presidential Envoy to Khakassia (1997–present)

==== Did not file ====
- Kaskar Domozhakov (Independent), son of writer Nikolay Domozhakov
- Anzhelika Kolosova (Independent)
- Valentin Kuzmin (Independent), Member of Supreme Council of the Republic of Khakassia (1997–present), rector of Khakassian State University (1994–present)

==== Results ====
Summary of the 1 June 1997 by-election in the Khakassia constituency
Candidate	Party	Votes	%
Sergey Gorshkov	Independent	14,978	17.62%
Gennady Azanov	Independent	12,896	15.17%
Olga Shirkovets	Independent	10,998	12.94%
Georgy Maytakov	Independent	9,545	11.23%
Valery Lushnikov	Independent	6,764	7.61%
Aleksandr Yerbyagin	Independent	3,918	4.61%
Vyacheslav Moskvitin	Independent	3,897	4.58%
Sergey Ivanov	Independent	3,514	4.13%
Tatyana Batukhtina	Independent	3,416	4.01%
Yekaterina Shipova	Independent	1,534	1.80%
Nikolay Medvedev	Independent	1,100	1.29%
Nikolay Charkov	Independent	694	0.81%
Vladimir Burakov	Independent	638	0.75%
Viktor Panyushkin	Independent	524	0.61%
Sergey Fomintsev	Independent	300	0.35%
against all		8,397	9.88%
Invalid ballots		2,153	2.53%
Total		84,976	100%
Registered voters/turnout		382,931	22.19%

=== 1997 (October) ===
==== Declared candidates ====
- Gennady Azanov (Independent), journalist, June 1997 candidate for this seat
- Nikolay Brodyuk (Independent)
- Sergey Gorshkov (Independent), Member of Supreme Council of the Republic of Khakassia (1992–present), engineer, June 1997 candidate for this seat
- Sergey Ivanov (Independent), June 1997 candidate for this seat
- Andrey Karpov (Independent)
- Valery Khlebnikov (Independent)
- Yury Lyakh (Independent), former Member of Supreme Council of the Republic of Khakassia (1992–1996)
- Georgy Maytakov (Independent), former Envoy of Khakassia to Primorsky Krai (1994–1997), retired Russian Navy captain 1st rank, June 1997 candidate for this seat
- Vladimir Mitin (Independent)
- Galina Salata (Independent), Member of Supreme Council of the Republic of Khakassia (1997–present), education union leader
- Olga Shirkovets (Independent), Member of Supreme Council of the Republic of Khakassia (1997–present), journalist, June 1997 candidate for this seat
- Vladimir Varenya (Independent)

==== Withdrawn candidates ====
- Andrey Kravtsov (Independent), Chairman of the Khakassia Committee on Economy

==== Did not file ====
- Viktor Andreyev (Independent), former Member of Supreme Council of the Republic of Khakassia (1992–1996)
- Viktor Bargoyakov (Independent)
- Vladimir Borkovets (Independent)
- Nikolay Lyakhov (Independent), coal miner
- Vladimir Pilipchuk (Independent)

==== Results ====
Summary of the 26 October 1997 by-election in the Khakassia constituency
Candidate	Party	Votes	%
Georgy Maytakov	Independent	29,192	20.35%
Gennady Azanov	Independent	20,776	14.49%
Olga Shirkovets	Independent	20,418	14.24%
Yury Lyakh	Independent	16,923	11.80%
Galina Salata	Independent	15,438	10.76%
Sergey Gorshkov	Independent	10,667	7.44%
Vladimir Varenya	Independent	3,177	2.22%
Vladimir Mitin	Independent	1,939	1.35%
Nikolay Brodyuk	Independent	1,260	0.88%
Andrey Karpov	Independent	1,209	0.84%
Sergey Ivanov	Independent	961	0.67%
Valery Khlebnikov	Independent	717	0.50%
against all		16,383	11.42%
Total		143,419	100%

=== 1999 ===
==== Declared candidates ====
- Gennady Azanov (Independent), journalist, 1997 candidate for this seat
- Igor Chernolutsky (Independent), entrepreneur
- Nikolay Kochurov (Independent), entrepreneur
- Viktor Kotelnikov (Independent), Member of Supreme Council of the Republic of Khakassia (1997–present), businessman
- Georgy Maytakov (Independent), incumbent Member of State Duma (1997–present)
- Nina Pilyugina (Women of Russia), Minister of Labor and Social Protection of Khakassia (1997–present)
- Sergey Sapeyev (Independent), lawyer

==== Withdrawn candidates ====
- Svetlana Brykina (LDPR)
- Aleksey Chevtayev (Independent)

==== Failed to qualify ====
- Igor Akhpashev (Independent)
- Tatyana Guselnikova (Independent)
- Valery Khebnikov (DN), 1997 candidate for this seat
- Gennady Ryndin (Independent)

==== Did not file ====
- Vladimir Dein (Independent)
- Nikolay Dzerzhko (Independent)
- Nikolay Lyakhov (Independent), coal miner, 1997 candidate for this seat
- Nikolay Sorokin (Independent)
- Veniamin Striga (Nikolayev–Fyodorov Bloc), former Presidential Envoy to Khakassia (1997–1998), 1997 candidate for this seat
- Gennady Tabastayev (Independent), former Minister of Culture of Khakassia (1997)
- Rostislav Tsykalo (Independent), Member of Supreme Council of the Republic of Khakassia (1992–present), former People's Deputy of the Soviet Union (1989–1991)

==== Results ====
Summary of the 19 December 1999 Russian legislative election in the Khakassia constituency
Candidate	Party	Votes	%
Georgy Maytakov (incumbent)	Independent	94,124	41.90%
Nina Pilyugina	Women of Russia	50,018	22.26%
Gennady Azanov	Independent	19,696	8.77%
Nikolay Kochurov	Independent	18,070	8.04%
Viktor Kotelnikov	Independent	11,144	4.96%
Sergey Sapeyev	Independent	5,722	2.55%
Igor Chernolutsky	Independent	1,902	0.85%
against all		21,034	9.36%
Total		224,657	100%

=== 2003 ===
==== Declared candidates ====
- Vasily Chaptykov (NPS RF), insurance executive
- Yelena Kilchichakova (Independent), attorney
- Aleksandr Mustonen (Independent), retired Russian Space Forces colonel
- Valery Sagalakov (VR–ES), pensioner
- Gennady Semigin (CPRF), Deputy Chairman of the State Duma (2000–present)
- Aleksandr Semyonov (LDPR), entrepreneur

==== Failed to qualify ====
- Aleksandr Astakhov (RKDP), nonprofit president
- Viktor Bargoyakov (Independent), unemployed, 1997 candidate for this seat
- Leonid Bogdanov (Independent), businessman
- Vladimir Smagin (Independent), nonprofit chairman

==== Did not file ====
- Nikolay Cheltygmashev (Independent), electrician
- Yury Ustinov (RPT), technical specialist

==== Declined ====
- Georgy Maytakov (Independent), incumbent Member of State Duma (1997–present)

==== Results ====
Summary of the 7 December 2003 Russian legislative election in the Khakassia constituency
Candidate	Party	Votes	%
Gennady Semigin	Communist Party	94,538	48.41%
Aleksandr Semyonov	Liberal Democratic Party	39,015	19.98%
Yelena Kilchichakova	Independent	23,717	12.15%
Valery Chaptykov	National Patriotic Forces	7,542	3.86%
Yevgeny Sagalakov	Great Russia – Eurasian Union	4,531	2.32%
Aleksandr Mustonen	Independent	810	0.41%
against all		22,495	11.52%
Total		195,345	100%

=== 2016 ===
==== Declared candidates ====
- Dmitry Bureyev (LDPR), journalist, community activist
- Oleg Ivanov (Yabloko), Member of Supreme Council of the Republic of Khakassia (2009–present), 2013 PARNAS head candidate
- Nadezhda Maksimova (United Russia), Member of State Duma (2003–present)
- Lyudmila Mindibekova (A Just Russia), former Member of Supreme Council of the Republic of Khakassia (1997–2000, 2009–2013), management professor
- Aleksandr Semyonov (CPRF), Member of Supreme Council of the Republic of Khakassia (2013–present), transportation businessman, 2003 LDPR candidate for this seat
- Viktor Veryasov (The Greens), entrepreneur

==== Failed to qualify ====
- Oleg Golovchenko (CPCR), businessman
- Yury Shchapov (Independent), former Member of Supreme Council of the Republic of Khakassia (2000–2004), former Member of Federation Council (1994–1996), coal businessman

==== Declined ====
- Anton Savchenko (United Russia), Member of Supreme Council of the Republic of Khakassia (2009–present), Rusal regional representative (lost the primary, ran on the party list)

==== Results ====
Summary of the 18 September 2016 Russian legislative election in the Khakassia constituency
Candidate	Party	Votes	%
Nadezhda Maksimova	United Russia	52,583	33.85%
Aleksandr Semyonov	Communist Party	49,093	31.61%
Dmitry Bureyev	Liberal Democratic Party	17,622	11.34%
Lyudmila Mindibekova	A Just Russia	14,167	9.12%
Oleg Ivanov	Yabloko	11,582	7.46%
Viktor Veryasov	The Greens	4,279	2.75%
Total		155,332	100%

=== 2021 ===
==== Declared candidates ====
- Denis Brazauskas (CPCR), Member of Supreme Council of the Republic of Khakassia (2013–present), perennial candidate, 2013 head candidate
- Yevgeny Cheltygmashev (Independent), Member of Supreme Council of the Republic of Khakassia (2019–present), corporate executive
- Valery Ilyashchuk (New People), Mayor of Beltirskoye (2015–present)
- Aleksey Khabarov (Rodina), chairman of the party regional office
- Vitaly Maleyev (RPPSS), pensioner
- Mikhail Molchanov (LDPR), coordinator of the party regional office
- Aleksandr Myakhar (SR–ZP), businessman, 2018 Party of Growth head candidate
- Sergey Sokol (United Russia), Member of State Duma (2020–present)
- Valery Starostin (CPRF), Member of Supreme Council of the Republic of Khakassia (2009–present)
- Yekaterina Yagupova (The Greens), homemaker

==== Failed to qualify ====
- Aleksey Ivanov (Independent), former Director of the Ministry of Energy of Russia Department of Project Activity (2017–2020), former Deputy Premier of Khakassia – Minister of Finance and Economy (2005–2008)
- Natalya Kokorina (Independent), homemaker
- Denis Kongarov (Independent), farmer
- Mikhail Kuimov (Independent), chairman of the DOSAAF regional office
- Ksenia Navrotskaya (Independent), political strategist
- Vladimir Poteryaylo (Independent), pensioner
- Larisa Yugova (Independent), Member of Krasnopolye Council of Deputies (2020–present)

==== Declined ====
- Abrek Cheltygmashev (United Russia), Head of Askizsky District (2002–2009, 2012–present), former Deputy Premier of Khakassia (2009–2010) (lost the primary)
- Nadezhda Maksimova (United Russia), incumbent Member of State Duma (2003–present)

==== Results ====
Summary of the 17-19 September 2021 Russian legislative election in the Khakassia constituency
Candidate	Party	Votes	%
Sergey Sokol	United Russia	42,616	28.97%
Valery Starostin	Communist Party	33,112	22.51%
Yevgeny Cheltygmashev	Independent	24,755	16.83%
Denis Brazauskas	Communists of Russia	9,856	6.70%
Valery Ilyashchuk	New People	9,700	6.59%
Aleksandr Myakhar	A Just Russia — For Truth	6,651	4.52%
Mikhail Molchanov	Liberal Democratic Party	5,315	3.61%
Vitaly Maleyev	Party of Pensioners	3,966	2.70%
Yekaterina Yagupova	The Greens	3,602	2.45%
Aleksey Khabarov	Rodina	1,672	1.14%
Total		147,101	100%

=== 2024 ===
==== Declared candidates ====
- Mikhail Gayday (ZA!), party press secretary
- Sergey Izmaylov (GP), businessman
- Anton Palyulin (PPD), attorney
- Nikolay Shulginov (Independent), former Minister of Energy of Russia (2020–2024)
- Georgy Slyvus (The Greens), individual entrepreneur
- Vladimir Smyshlyayev (SR–ZP), Member of Chernogorsk Council (2017–present), road safety manager

==== Declined ====
- Viktoria Abramchenko (United Russia), former Deputy Prime Minister of Russia (2020–2024) (ran in the Southern constituency)
- Oleg Artemyev (United Russia), Member of Moscow City Duma (2019–present), cosmonaut (ran for re-election)
- Yevgeny Cheltygmashev (Independent), Member of Supreme Council of the Republic of Khakassia (2019–present), 2021 candidate for this seat
- Oleg Golovchenko (CPRF), entrepreneur, 2016 CPCR candidate for this seat (ran for Mayor of Abakan)
- Oleg Ivanov (Independent), Member of Supreme Council of the Republic of Khakassia (2009–present), 2013 PARNAS and 2018 RPPSS head candidate, 2016 Yabloko candidate for this seat
- Valentin Konovalov (CPRF), Head of the Republic of Khakassia (2018–present) (endorsed Shulginov)
- Nina Leonchenko (CPRF), Mayor of Ust-Abakan (2018–present)
- Igor Mamontov, advisor to Head of the Republic of Khakassia Valentin Konovalov, former head of United Russia regional office executive committee (2015–2021)
- Vitaly Minakov (Independent), professional MMA fighter, 2008–2011 World Sambo champion
- Mikhail Molchanov (LDPR), Member of Supreme Council of Khakassia (2022–present), 2021 candidate for this seat, 2023 head candidate
- Grigory Nazarenko (CPRF), Deputy Chairman of the Supreme Council of the Republic of Khakassia (2023–present), Member of the Supreme Council (2018–present)
- Vladimir Shtygashev (CPRF), Member of Supreme Council of the Republic of Khakassia (1990–present), former Chairman of the Supreme Council (1990–1992, 1992–2023), former Deputy Chairman of the Supreme Soviet of the Russian SFSR (1985–1990)
- Andrey Shulbayev (United Russia), Commissioner for Human Rights in Khakassia (2019–present) (withdrew from the primary)
- Valery Starostin (CPRF), Member of Supreme Council of the Republic of Khakassia (2009–present), 2021 candidate for this seat

==== Results ====
Summary of the 6–8 September 2024 by-election in the Khakassia constituency
Candidate	Party	Votes	%
Nikolay Shulginov	Independent	59,730	55.30%
Vladimir Smyshlyayev	A Just Russia – For Truth	32,189	29.80%
Mikhail Gayday	Green Alternative	3,332	3.09%
Sergey Izmaylov	Civic Platform	2,539	2.35%
Anton Palyulin	Party of Direct Democracy	1,938	1.79%
Georgy Slyvus	The Greens	1,783	1.65%
Total		108,002	100%

=== 2026 ===
==== Declared candidates ====
- Pavel Kameko (CPCR), individual entrepreneur
- Ivan Misyuk (New People), Member of Chernogorsk Council of Deputies (2022–present)
- Mikhail Molchanov (LDPR), Member of Supreme Council of the Republic of Khakassia (2023–present), aide to State Duma member Alexei Didenko, 2023 head candidate
- Aleksandr Shtygashev (United Russia), En+ Group and Rusal executive, grandson of former Supreme Council of the Republic of Khakassia chairman Vladimir Shtygashev
- Valery Starostin (CPRF), Member of Supreme Council of the Republic of Khakassia (2009–present), security executive, 2021 candidate for this seat
- Irina Verbitskaya (A Just Russia), nurse
- Igor Yefremov (The Greens), former Deputy Chief of Staff to the Head of the Republic of Khakassia (2021–2022), Russian Army senior lieutenant

==== Failed to qualify ====
- Igor Archimayev (Independent), Medical Service lieutenant, OB-GYN

==== Did not file ====
- Yevgeny Skotchenko (Independent), realtor
- Vasily Zudenko (Independent), individual entrepreneur

==== Declined ====
- Tayir Achitayev (CPRF), former Member of Supreme Council of the Republic of Khakassia (2018–2023), employment centre deputy director (lost the primary, running on the party list)
- Oleg Ivanov (CPRF), Member of Supreme Council of the Republic of Khakassia (2009–present), 2013 PARNAS and 2018 RPPSS head candidate, 2016 Yabloko candidate for this seat (lost the primary, running on the party list)
- Nina Ostanina (CPRF), Member of State Duma (1996–2011, 2021–present), Chairwoman of the Duma Committee on Family, Fatherhood, Motherhood, and Children (2021–present) (running on the party list)
- Oksana Razvarina (CPRF), Member of Supreme Council of the Republic of Khakassia (2018–present) (lost the primary)
- Nikolay Shulginov (United Russia), incumbent Member of State Duma (2024–present), Chairman of the Duma Committee on Energy (2024–present) (running on the party list)
- Aleksandr Vekshin (CPRF), former Member of Supreme Council of the Republic of Khakassia (2000–2004, 2016–2018) (lost the primary, running on the party list)

==== Results ====
Summary of the 18-20 September 2026 Russian legislative election in the Khakassia constituency
Candidate	Party	Votes	%
Aleksandr Shtygashev	United Russia	67,432	40.68%
Valery Starostin	Communist Party	37,361	22.34%
Ivan Misyuk	New People	13,195	7.96%
Irina Verbitskaya	A Just Russia	13,139	7.93%
Mikhail Molchanov	Liberal Democratic Party	12,318	7.43%
Igor Yefremov	The Greens	10,522	6.35%
Pavel Kameko	Communists of Russia	5,760	3.47%
Total		165,777	100%
