= Nikolay Shulginov =

Russian politician

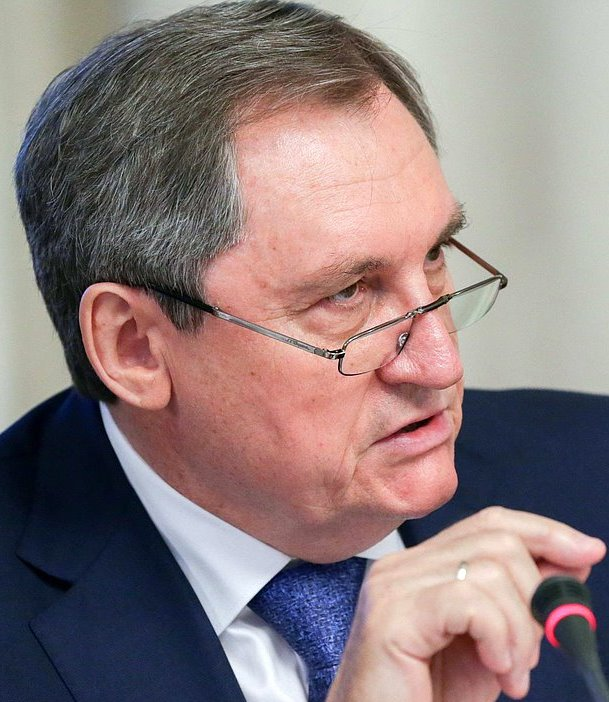

Chairman of the State Duma committee on energy
- Incumbent
- Assumed office 17 September 2024
- Preceded by: Pavel Zavalny

Deputy of State Duma Russia
- Incumbent
- Assumed office 8 September 2024
- Preceded by: Sergey Sokol
- Constituency: Khakassia (No.35)

Minister of Energy Russia
- In office 10 November 2020 – 14 May 2024
- President: Vladimir Putin
- Prime Minister: Mikhail Mishustin
- Preceded by: Alexander Novak
- Succeeded by: Sergey Tsivilyov

Personal details
- Born: 18 May 1951 (age 75) Sablinskoye, Alexandrovsky District, Stavropol Krai, Russian SFSR, Soviet Union (now Russia)
- Party: Independent
- Other political affiliations: United Russia (since 2024)
- Education: Novocherkassk Polytechnic Institute

Nikolay Grigoryevich Shulginov (Russian: Николай Григорьевич Шульгинов; born 18 May 1951) is a Russian politician and energy executive. Chairman of the State Duma Russia committee on energy from 17 September 2024.

Serving as deputy of State Duma Russia since September 2024. He served as Minister of Energy from 2020 to 2024. He was the chairman of the board of management and a General Director of PJSC RusHydro from 15 September 2015 to 10 November 2020.

According to Kommersant, Shulginov entered the top 10 Russian entrepreneurs and top managers in terms of the number of publications in the media in a positive tone at the end of 2020.

== Biography ==
Nikolay Shulginov was born on 18 May 1951 in the village of Sablinskoye, Stavropol Krai. In 1973, he graduated from the Novocherkassk Polytechnic Institute in Rostov Oblast with a degree in Power Supply to Industrial Enterprises and Cities. From 1976 to 1998, he worked at Stavropolenergo in the city of Pyatigorsk, where he held positions from engineer to head of the Central Dispatch Service. Since 1998, he worked as Deputy Director at the branch of RAO UES of Russia - the United Dispatch Administration of the North Caucasus in Pyatigorsk.

In 2002, Shulginov was invited to Moscow as a member of the Management Board, Director for Technical Audit of OJSC System Operator - UES Central Dispatch Office. In 2004 he became Deputy Chairman, and in 2009, he was promoted to First Deputy Chairman of the Management Board of System Operator.

On 15 September 2015, by the decision of the Board of Directors of PJSC RusHydro, Shulginov was elected for a five-year term as Chairman of the Management Board - General Director of RusHydro, replacing Evgeny Dod in this position. Commenting on his appointment, Shulginov called his main task at RusHydro "putting things in order in all areas of the company's activities." He was a member of the Board of Directors of PJSC Rosseti, elected on 30 June 2016. Shulginov is a candidate of Technical Sciences, and was a member of the Board of Trustees of the National Research University "MPEI".

On 9 November 2020, Shulginov was announced as a candidate for the post of Minister of Energy by Mikhail Mishustin. On 10 November, he was appointed the Minister of Energy. In May 2024 Shulginov was rumoured to leave the Government of Russia. Shulginov eventually was not re-appointed to the Mikhail Mishustin's Second Cabinet and was replaced as Minister by Governor of Kemerovo Oblast Sergey Tsivilyov.

After leaving the Government Shulginov was appointed as chief advisor to Rosseti general director Andrey Ryumin. Shulginov was also rumoured to be a United Russia candidate in the upcoming Southern constituency by-election to the State Duma in Rostov Oblast, where Shulginov graduated institute. On June 10, 2024, Head of Khakassia Valentin Konovalov (CPRF) and Chairman of the Supreme Council of Khakassia Sergey Sokol (United Russia) held a joint meeting with Shulginov, where they offered Shulginov to run for State Duma in the Khakassia constituency with their support, which Shulginov accepted. Shulginov registered as an independent and was endorsed by both United Russia and CPRF. He won the by-election with 55.30% of the vote.

In anticipation of Shulginov's election Pavel Zavalny resigned from his position as Chairman of the State Duma Committee on Energy in late July 2024. On September 16, 2024, Shulginov, along with fellow freshmen and former Mikhail Mishustin's Cabinet member Viktoria Abramchenko and Oleg Matytsin, was unanimously admitted to the United Russia faction in the State Duma. On September 17, 2024, Shulginov was unanimously elected Chairman of the Duma Committee on Energy.

== Electoral history ==
=== 2024 ===
Summary of the 6–8 September 2024 by-election in the Khakassia constituency
| Candidate | Party | Votes | % |
|---|---|---|---|
| Nikolay Shulginov | Independent | 59,730 | 55.30% |
| Vladimir Smyshlyayev | A Just Russia – For Truth | 32,189 | 29.80% |
| Mikhail Gayday | Green Alternative | 3,332 | 3.09% |
| Sergey Izmaylov | Civic Platform | 2,539 | 2.35% |
| Anton Palyulin | Party of Direct Democracy | 1,938 | 1.79% |
| Georgy Slyvus | The Greens | 1,783 | 1.65% |
| Total | | 108,002 | 100% |

== Awards ==
- Medal of the Order "For Merit to the Fatherland", II сdegree (2012)
- Order of Honour (for his contribution to the preparation and holding of the 2014 Olympics in Sochi, 2014)
- Order "For Merit to the Fatherland", III degree (2024)
- Gratitude of the President of the Russian Federation (2018)
