= Gennady Semigin =

Russian politician

Gennady Semigin MP
- Геннадий Семигин
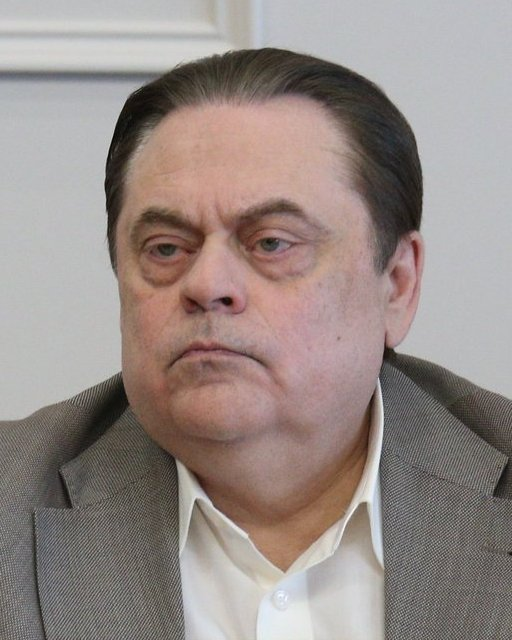
- Semigin in 2022

Member of the State Duma (Party List Seat)
- Incumbent
- Assumed office 12 October 2021
- In office 18 January 2000 – 29 December 2003

Member of the State Duma for Khakassia
- In office 29 December 2003 – 24 December 2007
- Preceded by: Georgy Maytakov
- Succeeded by: Constituencies abolished
- Constituency: Khakassia (No. 31)

Leader of the Patriots of Russia
- In office 20 April 2005 – 22 February 2021

Personal details
- Born: 23 March 1964 (age 62) Dunayevtsy, Khmelnytskyi Oblast, Ukrainian SSR, Soviet Union
- Party: SRZP (2021–present)
- Other political affiliations: Patriots of Russia (2005–2021); CPRF/CPSU (until 2004)
- Education: Riga Higher Military Political School; Moscow Law Institute; RANEPA

Gennady Yuryevich Semigin (Russian: Геннадий Юрьевич Семигин; born 23 March 1964) is a Russian politician who formerly led the nationalist political party Patriots of Russia party until it merged with A Just Russia — For Truth (SRZP) in 2021. Following the merger, Semigin was elected to the State Duma as part of the SRZP party list.

== Career ==
Born on 23 March 1964 in Dunaevtsy, Ukrainian SSR, Soviet Union, he studied in Riga on the history faculty, and then in the Moscow Institute of Jurisprudence. In the 1990s he ran a successful business. He is also a member of the Russian Academy of Science.

In 1999 and 2003 he was elected deputy of the State Duma from the Communist Party of the Russian Federation (CPRF). In the 2003 election he was the second ranked member on the CPRF list. The following year his ambitions of party leadership led him into conflict with the communist leader Gennady Zyuganov. Many old communists viewed rich Semigin as an opportunist, not a true member of the opposition. They labeled him a "mole" and the "Red oligarch". Despite this, Semigin was still elected chairman of the “People's Patriotic Union of Russia”, an umbrella organization that united the Communist party with minor opposition parties.

Semigin made several attempts to seize power from Zyuganov, including organisation of separate CPRF congress. But VTsIK didn't recognize Semigin's congress and pointed that only the official CPRF congress was legal. This congress voted to expel Semigin and his allies from the party.

In the Duma, Semigin moved to the Rodina faction, and at the same time founded his own party Patriots of Russia. He also organized the "People's Government" – the group of leftists politicians including Sergey Glazyev, Gennady Seleznyov and Gennady Gudkov that pretended to be a "future government".

=== Sanctions ===
He was sanctioned by the UK government in 2022 in relation to the Russo-Ukrainian War.

On 24 March 2022, the United States Treasury sanctioned him in response to the 2022 Russian invasion of Ukraine.
