= Alexander Novak =

Russian politician

- Александр Новак
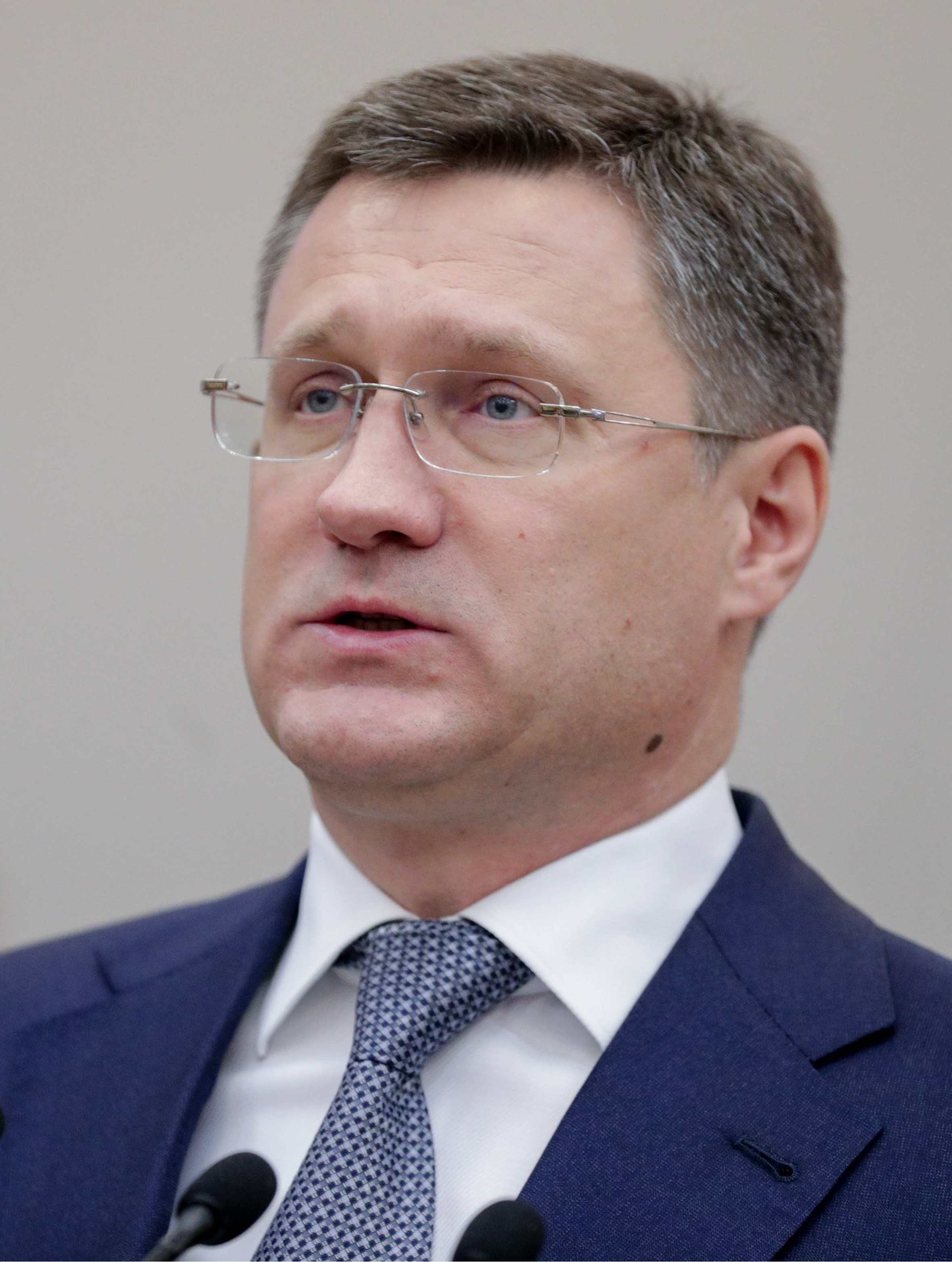
- Novak in 2019

Deputy Prime Minister of Russia for Fuel Energy Complex
- Incumbent
- Assumed office 10 November 2020
- Prime Minister: Mikhail Mishustin

Minister of Energy
- In office 21 May 2012 – 10 November 2020
- Prime Minister: Dmitry Medvedev; Mikhail Mishustin
- Preceded by: Sergei Shmatko
- Succeeded by: Nikolay Shulginov

Personal details
- Born: 23 August 1971 (age 55) Avdiivka, Donetsk Oblast, Ukraine SSR
- Party: United Russia
- Children: 2
- Education: Moscow State University (2009)

Alexander Valentinovich Novak (Russian: Александр Валентинович Новак; born 23 August 1971 in Avdiivka, Donetsk Oblast, Ukraine SSR) is a Russian politician who is a current deputy prime minister of Russia since November 2020.

Previously, he was the minister of energy of Russia between 2012 and 2020, before being replaced in November 2020 by the general director of RusHydro, Nikolay Shulginov.

== Career ==
In 1993, he graduated from Norilsk Industrial Institute as a specialist on economy and management in metallurgy.

=== Norilsk Nickel accountant (1993-1999) ===
Between 1993 and 1997, he was head of the Financial Bureau of the Accounting Department of the Norilsk Nickel Mining and Smelting Complex. In 1997 to 1999, he headed the tax planning department of the complex.

=== Entry into local and regional politics (2000–2008) ===
From 2000 to 2002, he was Norilsk deputy mayor for economics and finance, Norilsk's first deputy mayor. Between 2002 and 2007, he was head of the Main Finance Management of the Krasnoyarsk Krai Administration, Deputy Governor of the Krasnoyarsk Krai and head of the Main Finance Authority of the Krasnoyarsk Krai.

=== Deputy finance minister (2008–2012) ===
From September 2008 to May 2012, he was the deputy finance minister of the Russian Federation.

=== Energy minister (2012–2020) ===
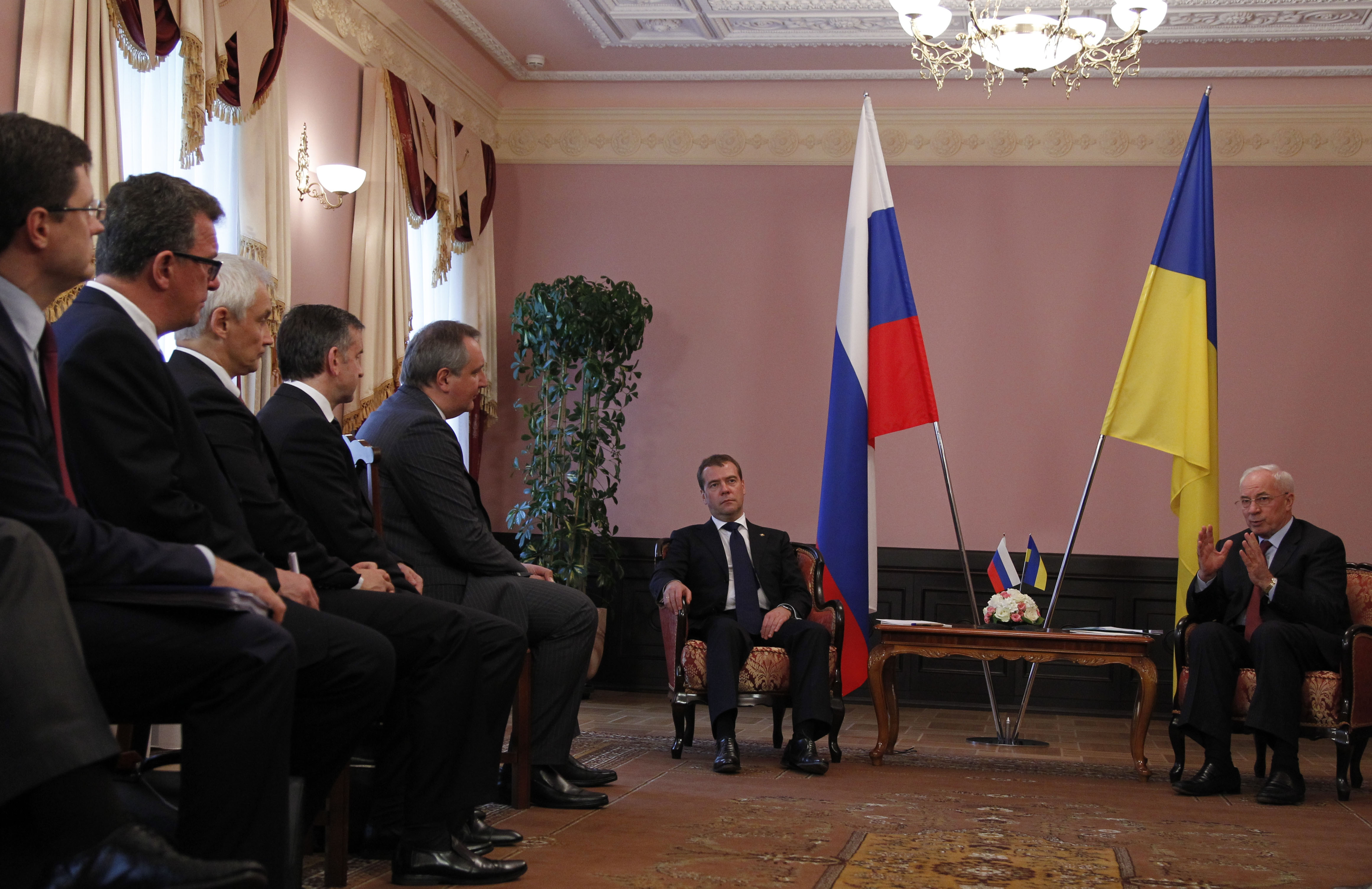
Novak, Russian PM Dmitry Medvedev and Ukrainian PM Mykola Azarov, 27 June 2012

In May 2012, he was appointed the energy minister in Dmitry Medvedev's Cabinet.

On 15 January 2020, Medvedev resigned his cabinet after President Vladimir Putin delivered the Presidential Address to the Federal Assembly, in which the latter proposed several amendments to the constitution.

On 21 January 2020, he obtained the position energy minister in Mikhail Mishustin's Cabinet.

=== Deputy prime minister for energy (2020-present) ===
In a reshuffle on 10 November 2020, Mikhail Mishustin exchanged Novak's energy ministry post for the deputy prime minister for the Fuel–Energy Complex.

Novak was a keynote speaker at the 2022 Russian Energy Week forum, which was held in Moscow from 12–14 October.

On 16 March 2023, Novak met with Saudi Arabia's energy minister, Prince Abdulaziz bin Salman Al Saud in Riyadh, Saudi Arabia to discuss continued Saudi-Russian cooperation within OPEC+.

In May 2023, Novak and Mishustin visited Beijing and met with Chinese president Xi Jinping. Novak said that Russian energy supplies to China will increase by 40 percent year-on-year in 2023.

Novak with Saudi Arabian Minister of Energy Abdulaziz bin Salman Al Saud during Russian Energy Week in Moscow, 15 October 2025

In May 2025, Putin approved Novak's coal industry bailout plan.

== Sanctions ==
In September 2022, the U.S. imposed sanctions on Novak in relation to the Russian annexation of four Ukrainian Oblasts, including his own native Donetsk.

== Personal life ==
On 18 August 2020, Russian prime minister Mikhail Mishustin announced that Novak tested positive for COVID-19.

== Awards, honours and directorships ==
In 2004, he was distinguished by the governor of Krasnoyarsk Krai. In 2006, he was rewarded with the medal "For Distinguished Service in Organizing the All-Russia Agricultural Census 2006" of the Russian Federal Statistics Service.

Since July 2010, he has been a member of United Aircraft Corporation board of directors.
