= Valery Usatyuk =

Russian politician (born 1948)

- Валерий Усатюк
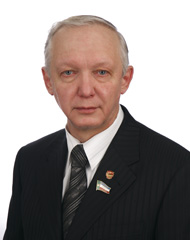

Russian Federation Senator from the Republic of Khakassia
- In office 16 November 2018 – 19 September 2023
- Preceded by: Valentina Petrenko
- Succeeded by: Oleg Zemtsov

Member of the Supreme Council of the Republic of Khakassia
- In office 26 December 2004 – 8 September 2013

Personal details
- Born: Valery Petrovich Usatyuk; 14 July 1948 (age 78) Frunze, Kirghiz Soviet Socialist Republic, Soviet Union
- Party: Communist Party of the Russian Federation
- Education: Irkutsk National Research Technical University

Valery Petrovich Usatyuk (Russian: Валерий Петрович Усатюк; born 14 July 1948) is a Russian politician, who is currently the member of the Federation Council representing the executive branch of the Republic of Khakassia, and a member of the Federation Council Committee on Defense and Security from 2018 to 2023.

Usatyuk was a member of the Supreme Council of the Republic of Khakassia from 2004 to 2013.

== Biography ==
Valery Usatyuk was born on 14 July 1948 in the city of Frunze, now Bishkek, in what was then the Kirghiz Soviet Socialist Republic, in the Soviet Union. In 1974, he graduated from the Irkutsk Polytechnic Institute, receiving the speciality of an electrical engineer. In 1988, he attended the Novosibirsk Higher Party School.

On 26 December 2004, Usatyuk was elected a member of the Supreme Council of the Republic of Khakassia of the IV convocation in the republican constituency from the Khakass regional branch of the Communist Party of the Russian Federation. On 1 March 2009, he was re-elected to the 5th convocation, also being a member of the republican list. As part of the elections to the Supreme Council of the Republic of Khakassia of the VI convocation, he headed the territorial group No. 8 of the party list of the Communist Party of the Russian Federation, but was not elected.

On 9 September 2018, Usatyuk was elected to the Council of Deputies of the city of Abakan in a single constituency from the Abakan local branch of the Communist Party, headed the Communist Party faction in the city parliament. He was one of the three contenders for the post of a member of the Federation Council from the executive branch of the Republic of Khakassia, from then-candidate from the Communist Party Valentin Konovalov, who took part in the elections of the head of the Republic of Khakassia in 2018. On 9 November 2018, Konovalov was elected the head of the region, and after the victory, he appointed Usatyuk as a representative from the Government of the region to the Federation Council. Usatyuk is the secretary of the Committee of the Khakass regional branch of the Communist Party of the Russian Federation on agitation and propaganda. He was a member of the election commission of the Republic of Khakassia with the right to vote. On 16 November 2018, Usatyuk became a Member of the Federation Council from the Republic of Khakassia on executive authority.

In March 2020, Usatyuk was one of three members of the Federation Council who abstained from voting on the law on constitutional amendments.

Usatyuk was awarded the Certificate of Honor of the Supreme Council of the Republic of Khakassia.

=== Sanctions ===
Since 9 March 2022, Usatyuk has been under personal EU sanctions.

He was sanctioned by the UK government in 2022 in relation to the Russo-Ukrainian War.
