= Alexander Zhukov (politician, born 1974) =

Russian politician (born 1974)

- Александр Жуков
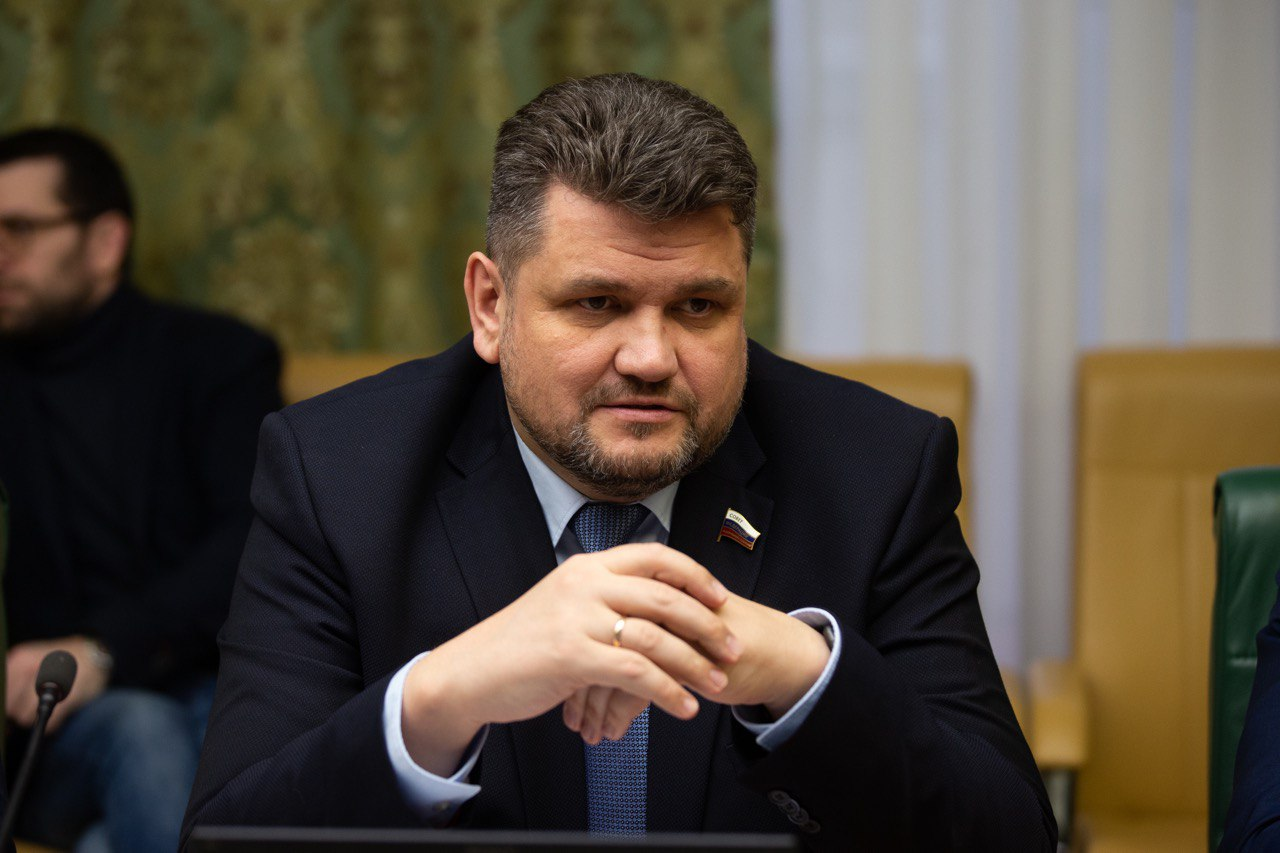

Senator from Khakassia
- Incumbent
- Assumed office 27 February 2019
- Preceded by: Yevgeny Serebrennikov

Personal details
- Born: Alexander Zhukov; 29 December 1974 (age 51) Karagaysky District, Perm Oblast, Russian Soviet Federative Socialist Republic, Soviet Union
- Party: United Russia
- Education: Irkutsk National Research Technical University

Alexander Arkadyevich Zhukov (Russian: Aлександр Аркадьевич Жуков; born 29 December 1974) is a Russian politician serving as a senator from Khakassia since 27 February 2019.

== Biography ==
Alexander Zhukov was born on 29 December 1974 in Karagaysky District, Perm Oblast. In 1997, he graduated from the Irkutsk National Research Technical University. Later he worked at the industrial enterprises of Yakutia. Later he was hired to work at the administration of Sorsk. From 2009 to 2014, he was the mayor of the city. Zhukov had to leave the post due to a criminal case of abuse of power. According to the investigation, he accepted work on the repair of the equipment of the city boiler house, which was not actually carried out by the contractor. On 9 January 2018, he was fully acquitted. On 27 February 2019, he was appointed the Senator from the State Council of Khakassia.

Alexander Zhukov is under personal sanctions introduced by the European Union, the United Kingdom, the USA, Canada, Switzerland, Australia, Ukraine, New Zealand, for ratifying the decisions of the "Treaty of Friendship, Cooperation and Mutual Assistance between the Russian Federation and the Donetsk People's Republic and between the Russian Federation and the Luhansk People's Republic" and providing political and economic support for Russia's annexation of Ukrainian territories.
