= Sorsk =

Town in the Republic of Khakassia, Russia

Sorsk Сорск
- Town

Other transcription(s)
  - Khakas: Сорығ
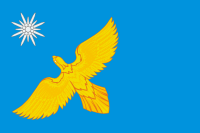
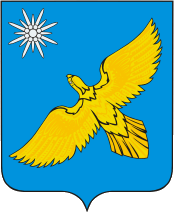
- Flag Coat of arms
- Interactive map of Sorsk
- Location of Sorsk Sorsk (Khakassia)
- Coordinates: 54°02′N 90°15′E
- Country: Russia
- Federal subject: Khakassia
- Founded: 1940s
- Town status since: 1966

Population (2010 Census)
  - Total: 12,143
  - Estimate (2021): 10,124 (−16.6%)

Administrative status
  - Subordinated to: Town of Sorsk
  - Capital of: Town of Sorsk

Municipal status
  - Urban okrug: Sorsk Urban Okrug
  - Capital of: Sorsk Urban Okrug
- Time zone: UTC+7 (MSK+4)
- Postal code: 655111
- Dialing codes: +7 390332, 390323
- OKTMO ID: 95709000001

Sorsk (Russian: Сорск; Khakas: Сорығ, Sorığ) is a town in the Republic of Khakassia, Russia, located 145 kilometers (90 mi) northwest of Abakan. Population: 12,143 (2010 census); 13,313 (2002 census); 15,130 (1989 Soviet census).

== History ==
It was founded as the work settlement of Dzerzhinsky in the 1940s. It was renamed Sorsk and granted town status in 1966.

== Administrative and municipal status ==
Within the framework of administrative divisions, it is, together with three rural localities, incorporated as the Town of Sorsk—an administrative unit with the status equal to that of the districts. As a municipal division, the Town of Sorsk is incorporated as Sorsk Urban Okrug.
