= Sergey Sokol =

Russian politician

- Сергей Сокол
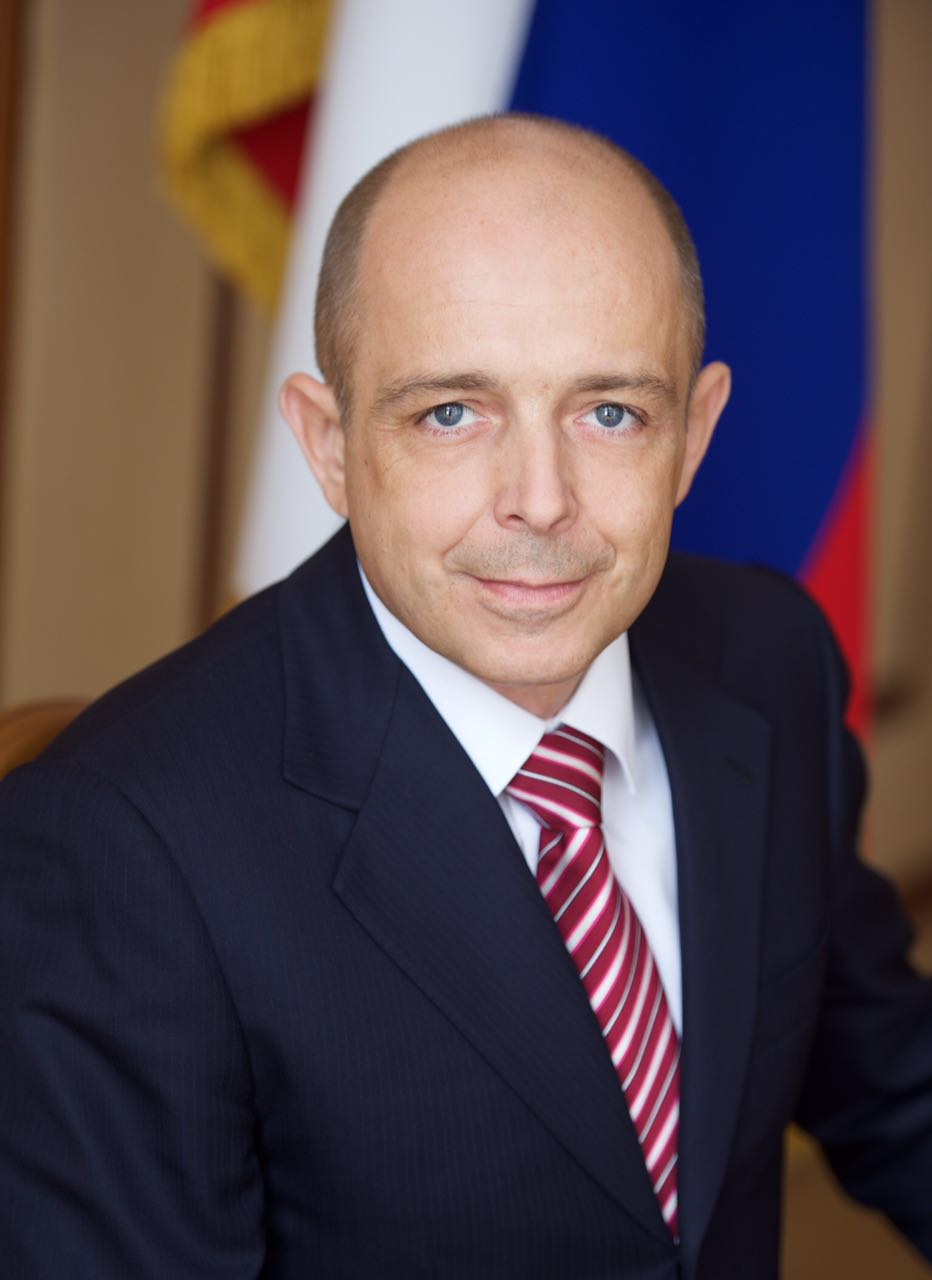
- Sokol in 2016

Chairman of the Supreme Council of the Republic of Khakassia
- Incumbent
- Assumed office 22 September 2023
- Preceded by: Vladimir Shtygashev

Member of the State Duma for Khakassia
- In office 12 October 2021 – 10 September 2023
- Preceded by: Nadezhda Maksimova
- Succeeded by: Nikolay Shulginov
- Constituency: Khakassia-at-large (No. 35)

Member of the State Duma (Party List Seat)
- In office 20 March 2020 – 12 October 2021

Personal details
- Born: 17 December 1970 (age 55) Sevastopol, Ukrainian SSR, USSR
- Party: United Russia
- Spouse: Daria Voronkova
- Children: 3 sons
- Education: Moscow State Institute of International Relations

Sergey Mikhailovich Sokol (Russian: Сергей Михайлович Сокол; born 17 December 1970 in Sevastopol, Soviet Union) is a Russian political figure, deputy of the 7th and 8th State Dumas.

From 1992 to 1994, Sokol was an Assistant Secretary of the Embassy of the Russian Federation in Ecuador. From June 1997 to October 2002, Sokol worked at the Norilskgazprom JSC. In 1999-2002, he was the deputy of the Duma of the Taymyr Autonomous Okrug of the 2nd convocation. He left the post on 22 October 2002, as he started a new job at the administration of the Krasnoyarsk Krai. From 2004 to 2008, he worked as Deputy Governor and Chief of Staff of the Administration Council of the Krasnoyarsk Territory. From April 2008 to May 2009, Sokol was the First Deputy Acting Governor of the Irkutsk Oblast. In 2016, he was elected deputy of the 7th State Duma. Since September 2021, he has served as deputy of the 8th State Duma.

In the Duma, Sokol represents the Khakassia region. However, local media has been critical of his activities as a deputy by pointing out the fact that he did not prepare any draft law on any of the crucial issues concerning the region.
