= Patriots of Russia =

Patriots of Russia Патриоты России
- Leader: Gennady Semigin
- Founded: 20 April 2005
- Dissolved: 22 February 2021
- Split from: Communist Party of the Russian Federation
- Preceded by: People's Patriotic Union of Russia; Russian Party of Labour
- Merged into: A Just Russia — For Truth
- Headquarters: 11th Building, Smolensky Boulevard, Moscow, Russia. 119121
- Ideology: Democratic socialism Left-wing nationalism
- Political position: Left-wing
- National affiliation: All-Russia People's Front
- Colours: Red; Yellow
- Seats in the Regional Parliaments: 22 / 3,982

Party flag
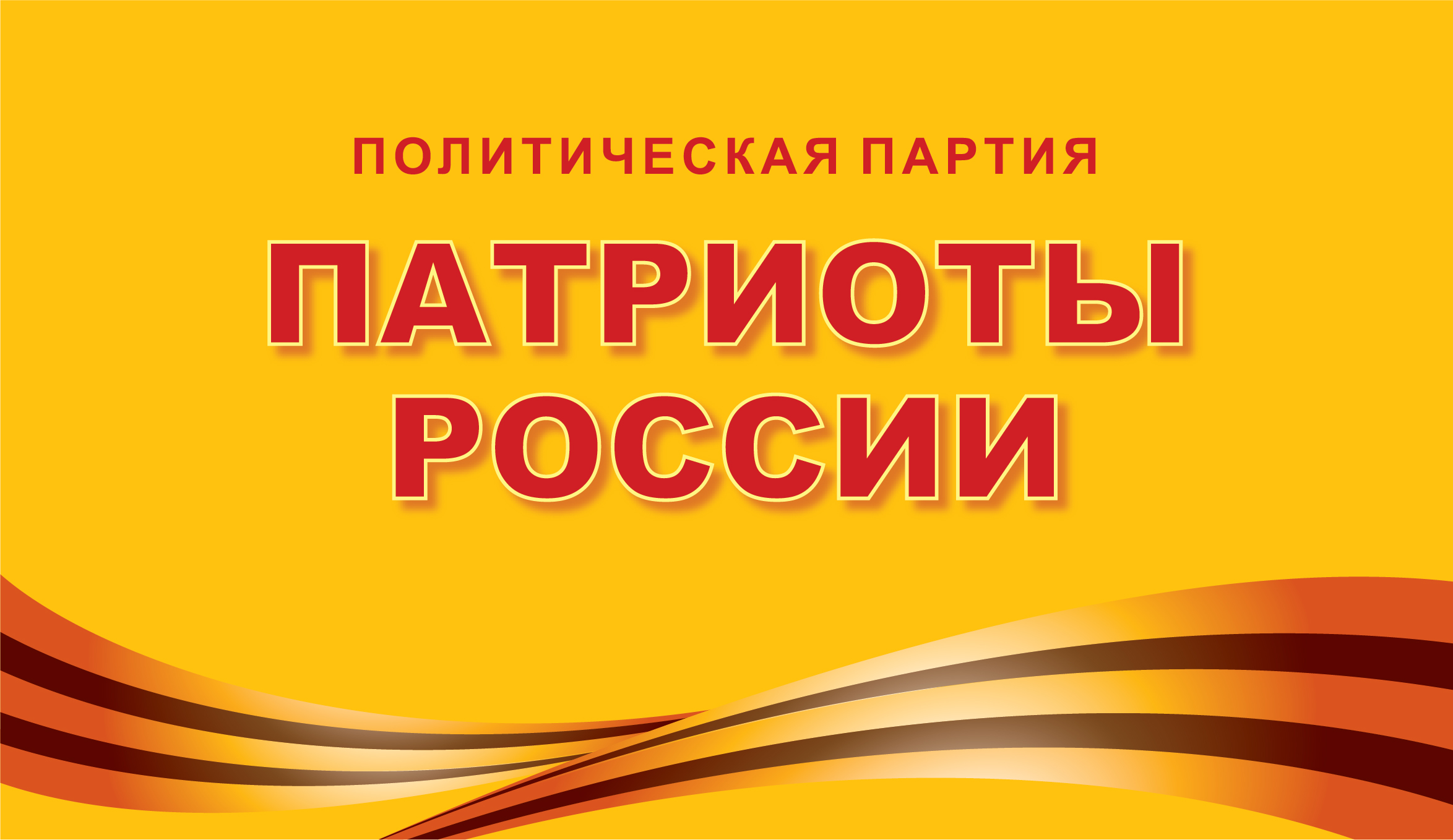

Website
- patriot-rus.ru

Party flag before 2014

Patriots of Russia (Russian: Патриоты России, Patrioty Rossii) was a left-wing political party in Russia. It was established in April 2005 by Gennady Semigin, who was expelled from the Communist Party of the Russian Federation after he failed in a power struggle with Gennady Zyuganov.

== History ==
The founding congress of Patriots of Russia was held on 20 April 2005. As new political party legislation in Russia made it difficult to start a new party, the creation was formalized as a name change of the officially registered Russian Party of Labour, which was led by Oleg Shein since is foundation in 2002.

In 2006 Gennadiy Semigin and his new party “Patriots of Russia” joined the Rodina faction in the Duma. Following Rodina's merger with the Russian Party of Life and the Russian Pensioners' Party under the leadership of Sergey Mironov in October 2006 to form the A Just Russia party, “Patriots of Russia” declared its intention to run as a separate party in the 2007 elections.

In 2008, the Party of Russia's Rebirth and Party of Peace and Unity teamed up with the party of Patriots of Russia In the 2016 State Duma elections, one of its candidates was Alexander Rutskoy, former Vice President of Russia.

The Patriots of Russia announced that they would not run in the 2018 Russian presidential election and that the party would support current president Vladimir Putin for the elections.

On 22 February 2021, the party united with the party For Truth, which subsequently merged into the A Just Russia party.

== Ideology ==
The party was officially democratic socialist and collectivist. The party had many of the same policy positions as the Communist Party of the Russian Federation.

== Electoral results ==
=== Presidential ===
Election	Candidate	First round		Second round		Result
Election	Candidate	Votes	%	Votes	%	Result
2008	Do not contest					
2012	Endorsed Vladimir Putin	46,602,075	63.60	—N/a		Won
2018	Endorsed Vladimir Putin	56,430,712	76.69	—N/a		Won

=== Legislative elections ===
Election	Party leader	Performance					Rank	Government
Election	Party leader	Votes	%	± pp	Seats	+/–	Rank	Government
2007	Gennady Semigin	615,417	0.89%	New	0 / 450	New	9th	Extra-parliamentary
2011	Gennady Semigin	639,119	0.97%	▲0.08	0 / 450	0	▲6th	Extra-parliamentary
2016	Gennady Semigin	310,015	0.59%	▼0.38	0 / 450	0	▼12th	Extra-parliamentary

=== Regions ===
Until 2011, the party had fractions in regional parliaments: the Kaliningrad region, Yaroslavl region, Republic of Dagestan, in the city of Kemerovo. 19 deputies in the regions of the referred from other parties.

13 September 2012, the party withdrew its candidate for the post of Governor of Ryazan region and supported the candidate from the ruling party United Russia.

14 October 2012, in the regional elections in the Republic of North Ossetia received (61039) 26.57% and is represented in the regional Parliament 14 deputies.
