= Supreme Council of the Republic of Khakassia =

Regional parliament of Khakassia, Russia

Supreme Council of the Republic of Khakassia Верховный Совет Республики Хакасия (Russian)

Leadership
- Chairman: Sergey Sokol, United Russia

Structure
- Seats: 50
- Political groups: United Russia (34) CPRF (14); LDPR (2)

Elections
- Voting system: Mixed
- Last election: 9 September 2023
- Next election: 2028

Website
- http://www.vskhakasia.ru/

The Supreme Council of the Republic of Khakassia (Russian: Верховный Совет Республики Хакасия; Khakas: Хакас Республиказының Ööркi Чöбi, romanized: Xakas Respublikazınıñ Öörkĕ Çöbĕ) is the regional parliament of Khakassia, a federal subject of Russia. A total of 50 deputies are elected for five-year terms.

The chairman of the Supreme Council of the Republic of Khakassia is the council's presiding officer.

== Elections ==
=== 2018 ===
Party	%	Seats
Communist Party of the Russian Federation	31.01	16
United Russia	25.46	17
Liberal Democratic Party of Russia	20.97	9
Communists of Russia	8.01	2
A Just Russia	7.09	2
Patriots of Russia	1.78	1
Russian Party of Pensioners for Social Justice	—	1
Independent	—	2
Registered voters/turnout	41.73	

=== 2023 ===
Party	%	Seats
Communist Party of the Russian Federation	39.11	14
United Russia	36.41	34
Liberal Democratic Party of Russia	7.17	2
New People	3.99	0
A Just Russia - For Truth	3.33	0
Russian Party of Pensioners for Social Justice	3.17	0
Communists of Russia	2.85	0
Registered voters/turnout	39.52	

== List of chairmen ==
This is a list of chairmen (speakers) of the Supreme Council:

- Vladimir Shtygashev (1991- 30 January 1992)
- Valery Shavyrkin (30 January 1992 - 4 February 1992)
- Vladimir Shtygashev (4 February 1992 - 22 September 2023
- Sergey Sokol (22 September 2023 - present)
