= Khakassia =

First-level administrative division of Russia

Republic of Khakassia Республика Хакасия (Russian)
- Republic

Other transcription(s)
  - Khakas: Хакас Республиказы
- Flag Coat of arms
- Anthem: "State Anthem of the Republic of Khakassia"
- Coordinates: 53°30′N 90°00′E
- Country: Russia
- Federal district: Siberian
- Economic region: East Siberian
- Established: 3 July 1991
- Capital: Abakan

Government
  - Body: Supreme Council
  - Head: Valentin Konovalov

Area
  - Total: 61,569 km^{2} (23,772 sq mi)
  - Rank: 46th

Population (2021 census)
  - Total: 532,403: 12.7% Khakas; 82.1% Russians; 0.7% Germans; 0.5% Tuvans; 0.4 Ukrainians; 3.6% other
  - Estimate (2018): 537,513
  - Rank: 69th
  - Density: 8.6473/km^{2} (22.396/sq mi)
  - Urban: 68.4%
  - Rural: 31.6%
- Time zone: UTC+7 (MSK+4)
- ISO 3166 code: RU-KK
- License plates: 19
- OKTMO ID: 95000000
- Official languages: Russian; Khakas
- Website: www.r-19.ru

Khakassia (Note: Russian: Хакасия, romanized: Khakasiya, Russian pronunciation: [xɐˈkasʲɪjə]; Khakas: Хакасия / Хакас Чирі, romanized: Xakasiya, Xakas Şçirĕ, [χɑˈqɑsijɑ, χɑˈqɑs ɕiˈɾɘ]) (/xəˈkæsiə, kə-/), officially the Republic of Khakassia, (Note: Russian: Республика Хакасия, romanized: Respublika Khakasiya, pronounced [rʲɪˈspublʲɪkə xɐˈkasʲɪjə]; Khakas: Хакас Республиказы, romanized: Xakas Respublikazı, [χɑˈqɑs rʲɪsˌpublʲɪkəˈzə]) is a republic of Russia located in southern Siberia. It is situated between Krasnoyarsk Krai to the north and the Altai Republic to the south.

The capital city of Khakassia is Abakan, and the region covers an area of about 61,900 square kilometres (23,900 sq mi). The population of Khakassia is approximately 537,000 people, with the majority of the population living in urban areas.

The region is known for its natural beauty, with numerous rivers, lakes, and mountains. The Khakassky Nature Reserve is located in the region, and it is home to a wide variety of wildlife, including brown bears, wolves, and sable. The region is also known for its traditional crafts, such as woodworking and embroidery, and for its traditional festivals and celebrations.

On July 3, 1991, the region was transformed into an autonomous republic within the RSFSR. It has had its current name since the beginning of 1992.

== Geography ==
The republic is located in the southwestern part of Eastern Siberia and borders Krasnoyarsk Krai in the north and east, the Tuva Republic in the southeast and south, the Altai Republic in the south and southwest, and Kemerovo Oblast in the west and northwest. It stretches for 460 kilometers (290 mi) from north to south and for 200 kilometers (120 mi) from east to west. Mountains (eastern slopes of Kuznetsk Alatau and the Abakan Range) cover two-thirds of the republic's territory and serve as the natural boundaries of the republic. The highest point is Kyzlasov Peak. The remaining territory is flat, with the Minusinsk Hollow being the most prominent feature. The Yenisei is the largest river in the republic. Other significant rivers include the Abakan, Tom’, Bely Iyus, Black Iyus, and the Chulym (between the Yenisei and the eastern mountains), with all except the Abakan part of the Ob river basin. There are over three hundred lakes in the republic, both salt- and fresh-water. The climate is continental, with the average annual temperature of 0 °C (32 °F). Natural resources are abundant and include iron, gold, silver, coal, oil, and natural gas. Molybdenum deposits are the largest in Russia. Forests cover the south and the west of the republic.

== History ==
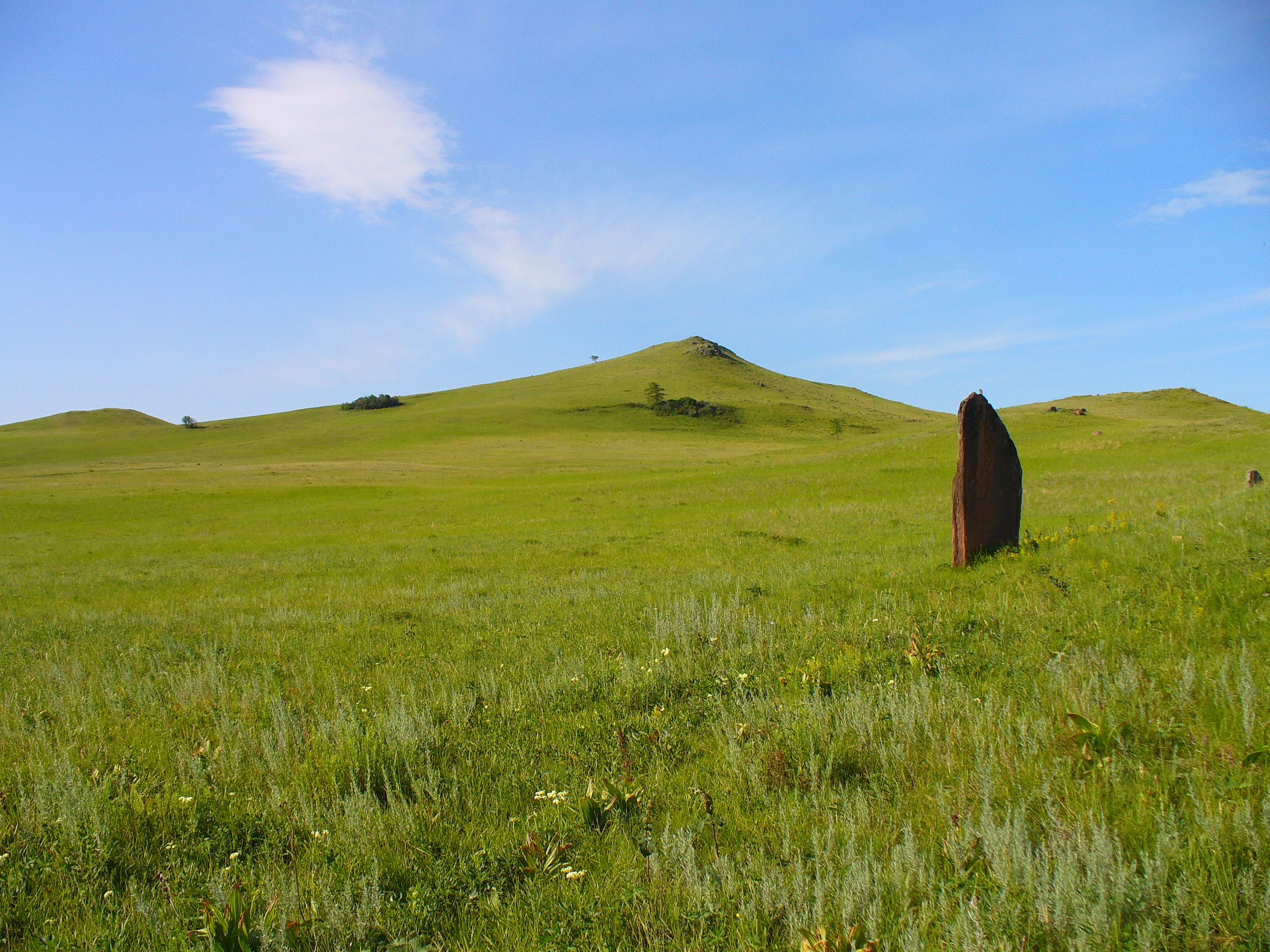
Ancient burial ground in the steppe

The territory of modern Khakassia formed the core of the Yenisei Kirghiz state from the 6th century AD. In the 13th century, following defeat by the Mongols, the majority of the Kyrgyz people migrated southwest to Central Asia to the area of present-day Kyrgyzstan. Modern Khakas people regard themselves as the descendants of those Kyrgyz who remained in Siberia. Khakassia was incorporated into the Russian state under Peter the Great (r. 1682–1725). This incorporation was confirmed in a treaty—the Treaty of Burya—between Russia and China in 1729. As it was common to deport convicted criminals from European Russia to Siberia, forts were quickly constructed in Khakassia (1707 and 1718). Many prisoners remained even after release. Many of the indigenous Khakas people converted to the Russian Orthodox faith and gradually abandoned their nomadic way of life.

By the time of the 1917 Russian Revolution, Russians made up approximately half of the population. Under Soviet rule, autonomy was granted on 20 October 1930, when the Khakas Autonomous Oblast was established. The borders of the autonomous oblast are the same as the borders of the modern Khakas Republic.

During the 1920s and 1930s, the Soviet authorities resettled an estimated quarter of a million Russians in the region. These were followed by 10,000 Volga Germans deported during World War II. By the time of the 1959 Census, ethnic Khakas people represented little more than 10% of the population of the Khakas oblast.

Until 1991, the Khakas Autonomous Oblast was administratively subordinated to Krasnoyarsk Krai. In July 1991, it was elevated in status to that of Autonomous Soviet socialist republic within the RSFSR, and in February 1992 it became the Republic of Khakassia.

== Administrative divisions ==
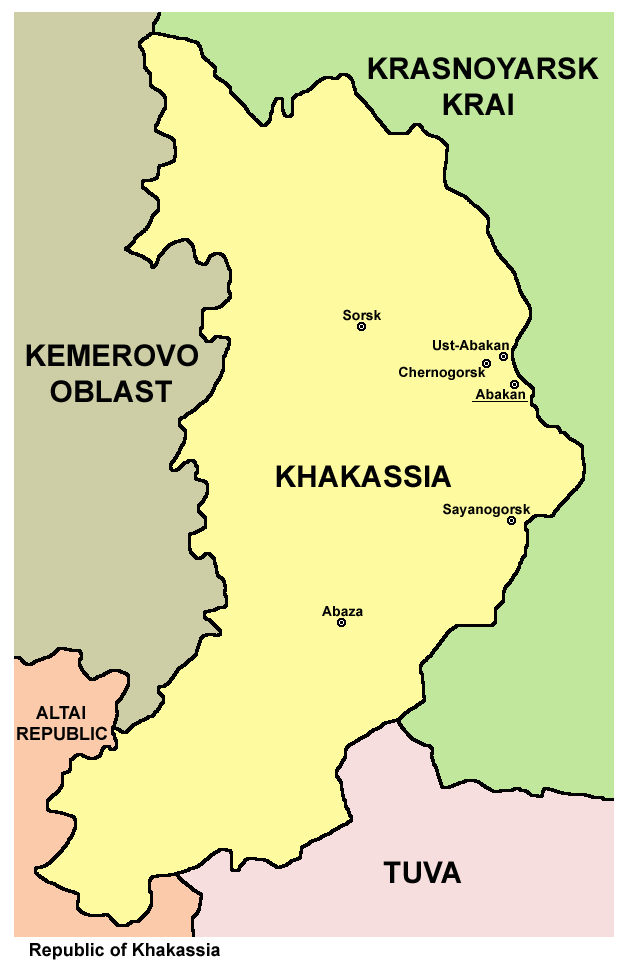
Map of the Republic of Khakassia

== Politics ==
The highest legal act of the region is the Constitution of the Republic of Khakassia. It was adopted on 25 May 1995 by the Supreme Council of the Republic.

The highest official of the republic, heading the executive power in the region, is the head of the Republic of Khakassia - the chairman of the government of the Republic of Khakassia. The term of office is 5 years. Since 15 November 2018, this post has been occupied by Valentin Konovalov (Communist Party of the Russian Federation).

Legislative power in Khakassia is exercised by the unicameral Supreme Council of the Republic of Khakassia, consisting of 50 deputies elected by a mixed electoral system: 25 by party lists and 25 by single-member districts. The United Russia faction makes up an absolute majority in the region's parliament (35 seats, 70%). The Chairman of the Supreme Council of the current VII convocation, elected in 2018, is Vladimir Shtygashev.

In the Federation Council, the region is represented by a member of the CPRF, Senator Valery Usatyuk, from the executive branch (since November 2018) and a member of United Russia, Senator Alexander Zhukov, from the legislative branch (since March 2019).

The deputy of the State Duma of the VIII convocation from Khakassia is Sergey Sokol (United Russia).

== Demographics ==
Population: 532,403 (2010 census); 546,072 (2002 census); 568,605 (1989 Soviet census).

Historical population
Year	Pop.	±%
1926	88,877	—
1939	272,730	+206.9%
1959	411,047	+50.7%
1970	445,824	+8.5%
1979	498,384	+11.8%
1989	566,861	+13.7%
2002	546,072	−3.7%
2010	532,403	−2.5%
2021	532,036	−0.1%
Source: Census data

=== Vital statistics ===
Source: Russian Federal State Statistics Service

	Average population (x 1000)	Live births	Deaths	Natural change	Crude birth rate (per 1000)	Crude death rate (per 1000)	Natural change (per 1000)	Fertility rates
1970	448	7,347	3,749	3,598	16.4	8.4	8.0	
1975	476	9,106	4,485	4,621	19.1	9.4	9.7	
1980	508	9,994	5,345	4,649	19.7	10.5	9.2	
1985	541	10,382	5,546	4,836	19.2	10.3	8.9	
1990	572	8,724	6,060	2,664	15.3	10.6	4.7	2,27
1991	573	8,114	6,195	1,919	14.2	10.8	3.3	2,14
1992	574	6,917	6,843	74	12.0	11.9	0.1	1,81
1993	574	6,152	8,387	2,235	10.7	14.6	3.9	1,58
1994	572	6,219	9,426	3,207	10.9	16.5	5.6	1,57
1995	571	5,807	8,186	2,379	10.2	14.3	4.2	1,44
1996	569	5,727	8,093	2,366	10.1	14.2	4.2	1,40
1997	566	5,309	7,766	2,457	9.4	13.7	4.3	1,28
1998	563	5,602	7,821	2,219	10.0	13.9	3.9	1,34
1999	559	5,312	8,304	2,992	9.5	14.8	5.3	1,25
2000	556	5,634	8,104	2,470	10.1	14.6	4.4	1,32
2001	552	5,576	8,561	2,985	10.1	15.5	5.4	1,28
2002	547	6,118	9,280	3,162	11.2	17.0	5.8	1,39
2003	542	6,417	9,660	3,243	11.8	17.8	6.0	1,44
2004	539	6,453	8,763	2,310	12.0	16.3	4.3	1,43
2005	536	6,198	9,411	3,213	11.6	17.6	6.0	1,35
2006	533	6,465	7,927	1,462	12.1	14.9	2.7	1,40
2007	531	7,384	7,324	60	13.9	13.8	0.1	1,60
2008	531	7,935	7,427	508	14.9	14.0	1.0	1,72
2009	531	8,062	7,255	807	15.2	13.7	1.5	1,81
2010	532	8,010	7,373	637	15.0	13.8	1.2	1,80
2011	532	8,013	7,154	859	15.1	13.4	1.7	1,83
2012	533	8,534	7,137	1,397	16.0	13.4	2.6	2,00
2013	534	8,362	6,987	1,375	15.7	13.1	2.6	2,01
2014	535	8,145	6,999	1,146	15.2	13.1	2.1	2,01
2015	536	7,911	7,216	695	14.8	13.5	1.3	1,99
2016	537	7,592	6,869	723	14.1	12.8	1.3	1,97
2017	537	6,662	6,752	-90	12.4	12.5	-0.1	1,78

In 2007, the republic recorded a positive natural increase of population for the first time in many years (Although very small, less than +0.01% per year), being one of the 20 Russian regions to have a positive natural population growth rate.

=== Ethnic groups ===
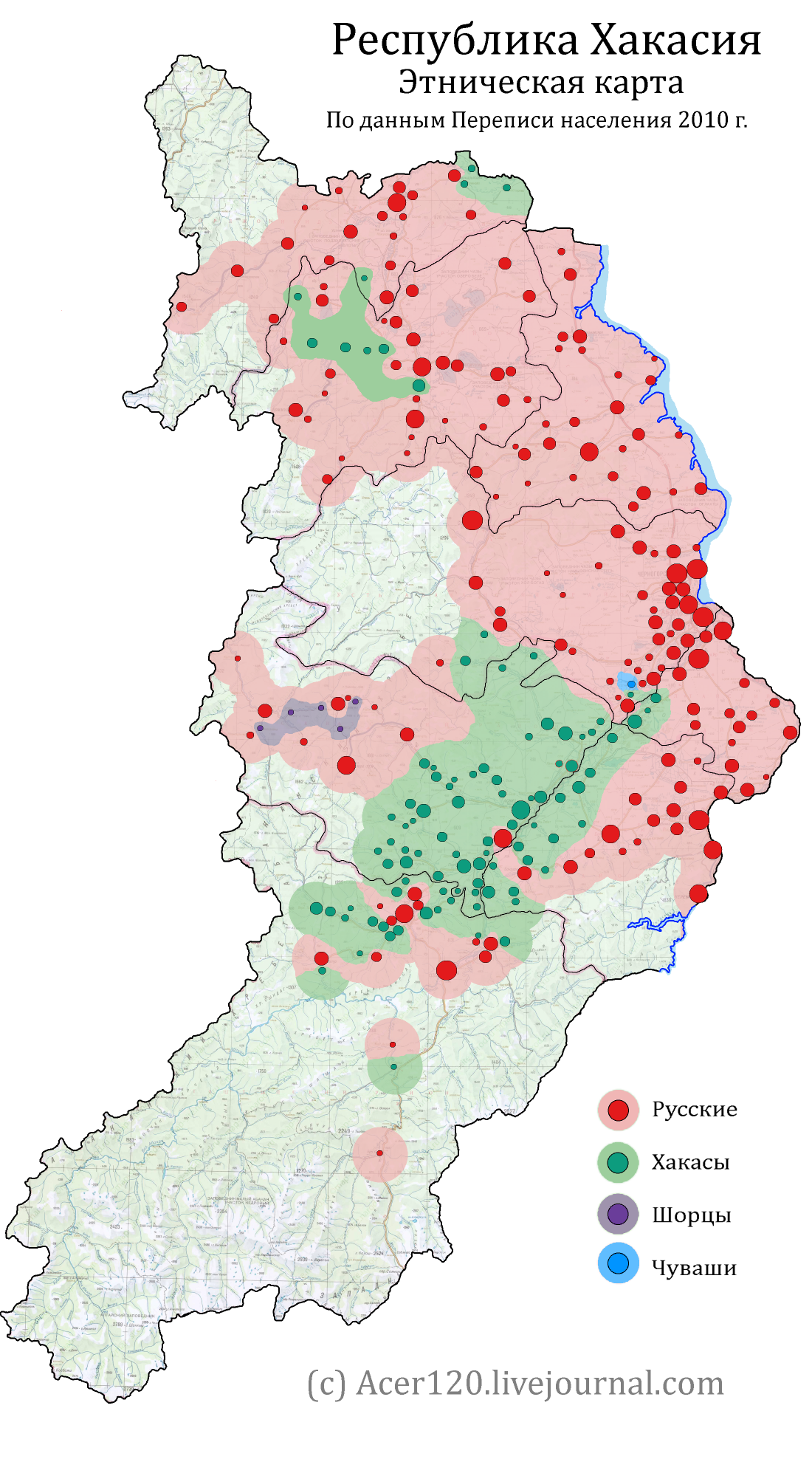
Ethnic map of the Republic of Khakassia by settlement, 2010 census. Russians Khakas Shors Chuvashes

According to the 2021 Russian Census, ethnic Russians make up 82.1% of the republic's population, while the ethnic Khakas are only 12.7%. Other groups include ethnic Germans (0.7%), Tuvans (0.5%), Ukrainians (0.4%), and a host of smaller groups, each accounting for less than 0.5% of the total population.

Ethnic group	1926 census		1939 census		1959 census		1970 census		1979 census		1989 census		2002 census		2010 census		2021 census^{1}	
Ethnic group	Number	%	Number	%	Number	%	Number	%	Number	%	Number	%	Number	%	Number	%	Number	%
Khakas	44,219	49.8%	45,799	16.8%	48,512	11.8%	54,750	12.3%	57,281	11.5%	62,859	11.1%	65,421	12.0%	63,643	12.1%	55,144	12.7%
Russians	41,390	46.6%	205,254	75.3%	314,455	76.5%	349,362	78.4%	395,953	79.4%	450,430	79.5%	438,395	80.3%	427,647	81.7%	356,325	82.1%
Germans	46	0.1%	333	0.1%	10,512	2.6%	10,547	2.4%	11,130	2.2%	11,250	2.0%	9,161	1.7%	5,976	1.1%	2,831	0.7%
Tuvans			21	0.0%	97	0.0%	188	0.0%	271	0.1%	521	0.1%	494	0.1%	936	0.2%	2,051	0.5%
Ukrainians	836	0.9%	7,788	2.9%	14,630	3.6%	9,480	2.1%	10,398	2.1%	13,223	2.3%	8,360	1.5%	5,039	1.0%	1,800	0.4%
Others	2,381	2.7%	13,535	5.0%	22,841	5.6%	21,497	4.9%	23,351	4.7%	28,578	5.3%	24,241	4.54	20,473	3.9%	15,630	3.6%
^{1} 8,689 people were registered from administrative databases, and could not declare an ethnicity. It is estimated that the proportion of ethnicities in this group is the same as that of the declared group.

=== Religion ===
Religion in Khakassia as of 2012 (Sreda Arena Atlas)
Russian Orthodoxy	31.6%
Other Orthodox	1.4%
Protestantism	0.8%
Other Christians	6%
Islam	0.6%
Rodnovery and other native faiths	2%
Spiritual but not religious	37.6%
Atheism and irreligion	15.8%
Other and undeclared	4.2%

According to a 2012 survey, 31.6% of the population of Khakassia adheres to the Russian Orthodox Church, 6% are unaffiliated Christians, 1% are Orthodox Christian believers without belonging to any church or are members of other (non-Russian) Orthodox churches. 2% of the population adheres to Slavic native faith (Rodnovery) or Khakas Tengrism and folk religion, 1% to Islam, 1% to forms of Protestantism, 0.4% to forms of Hinduism (Vedism, Krishnaism or Tantrism) and another 0.4% to Tibetan Buddhism. In addition, 38% of the population declares to be "spiritual but not religious", 16% is atheist, and 2.6% follows other religions or did not give an answer to the question.

== Economy ==
The main industries in the republic are coal mining, ore mining, and timber.

== Transport ==
The road network is most developed around the major cities of the centre, west, and southwest. Federal highway R-257 runs through Khakassia. Other major highways include the regional highway A161 south from R-257 in Abakan along the Abakan valley to Abaza and across the mountains to Ak-Dovurak (Tuva). The most developed sections of roads are Abakan - Sayanogorsk, Abakan - Beya, Abakan - Abaza, Abakan - Sorsk, Bograd - Shira - Kopyevo, and Kopyevo - Priiskovy. Roads to other smaller settlements are mainly dirt roads, although they are currently being replaced with a hard surface.

663 km of railways, electrified from Abakan to Kaltas. Other non-electrified sections are Tigey - Kopievo, Askiz - Abaza, Biskamzha - Toya.

The section of the Tigey-Kopyёvo railway and further to Uzhur, Achinsk connects two railway arteries: the Trans-Siberian Railway and Yuzhsib (South-Siberian: Taishet - Abakan - Novokuznetsk - Artyshta - Barnaul - Kulunda - Pavlodar - Astana - Tobol - Kartaly - Magnitogorsk). In addition to Abakan, the central station is Biskamzha. The city of Sayanogorsk is connected to the railway network through the station Kamyshta.

Airports: Abakan International Airport has regular flights to Moscow, Norilsk, Novosibirsk, Tomsk, and Krasnoyarsk.

== Sports ==
Sayany-Khakassia has been playing in the highest division of Russian bandy, the Russian Bandy Super League, for a long time, but was relegated after the 2012–13 season. Now they play in the 2nd highest division.

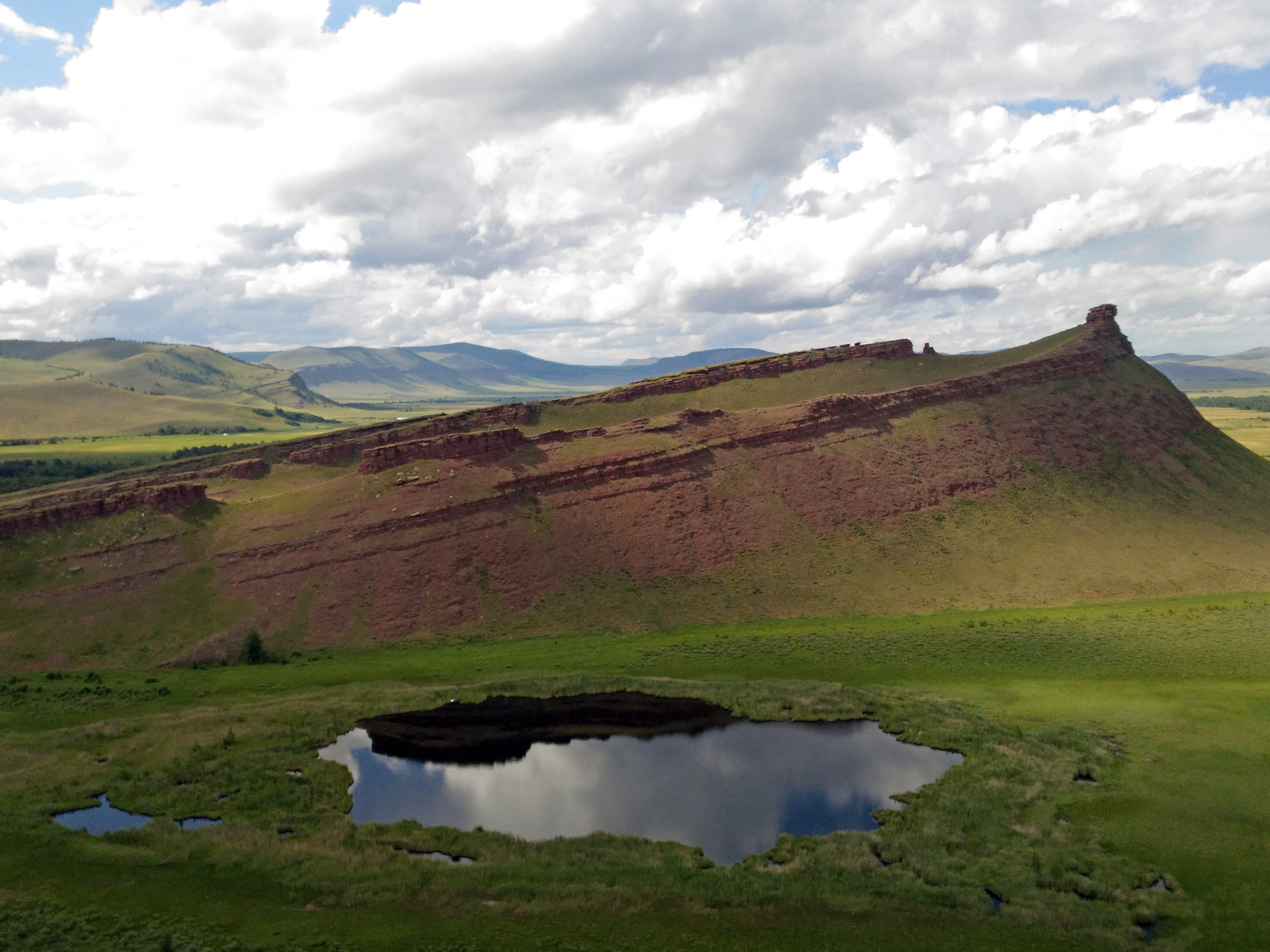
The Sunduki Highlands.

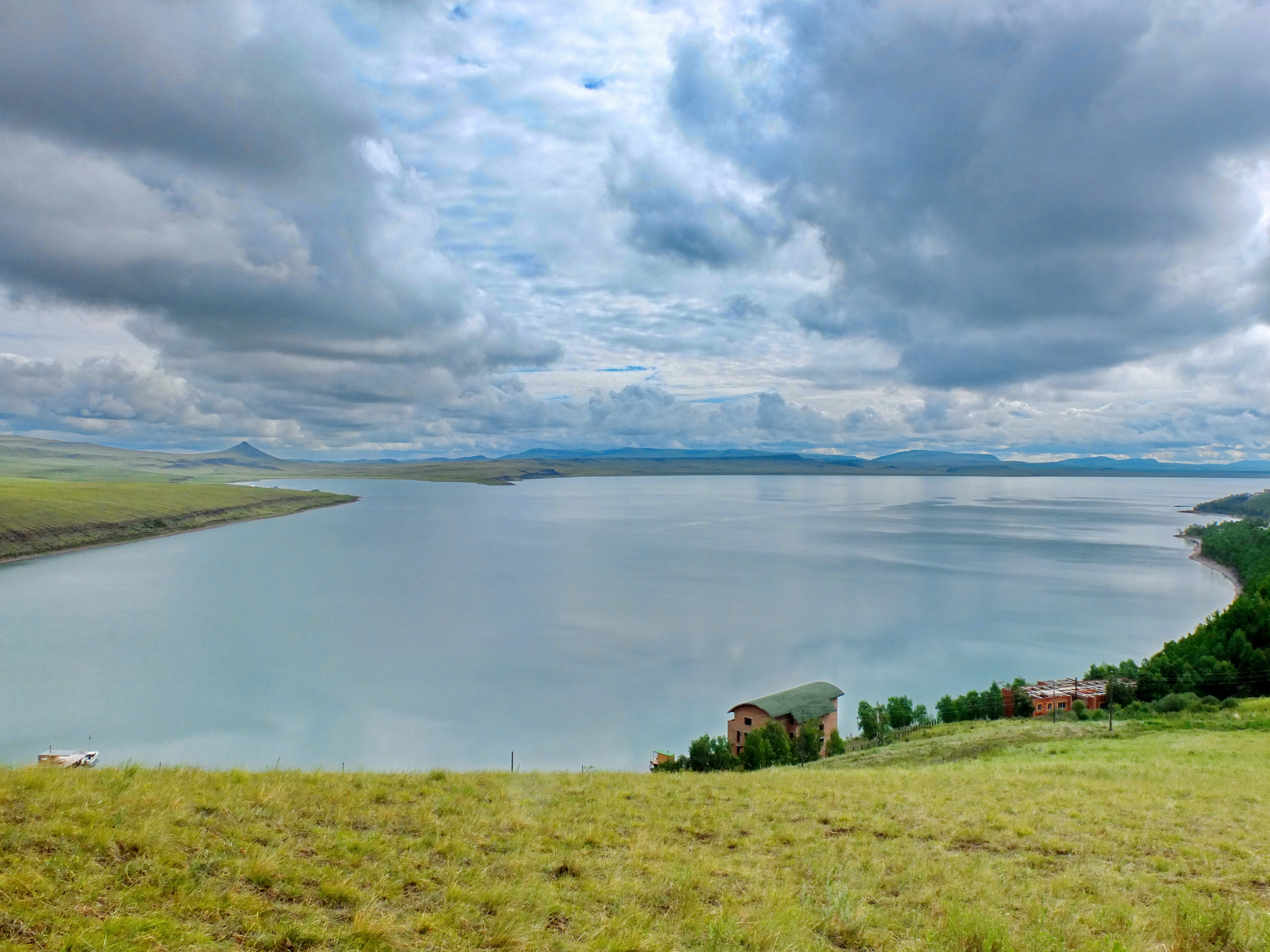
Lake Belyo, the largest in Khakassia.

== See also ==
- List of Chairmen of the Supreme Council of Khakassia
- Music in Khakassia
- Altai-Sayan region

== Sources ==
- Верховный Совет Республики Хакасия. №45 25 мая 1995 г. «Конституция Республики Хакасия», в ред. Конституционного закона №19-ЗРХ от 8 апреля 2015 г. «О внесении изменений в Конституцию Республики Хакасия». Вступил в силу 30 июня 1995 г. Опубликован: "Вестник Хакасии", №25, 1995. (Supreme Council of the Republic of Khakassia. #45 May 25, 1995 Constitution of the Republic of Khakassia, as amended by the Constitutional Law #19-ZRKh of April 8, 2015 On Amending the Constitution of the Republic of Khakassia. Effective as of June 30, 1995.).
- Верховный Совет РСФСР. Закон №1539-I от 1923 г. «О порядке преобразования Адыгейской, Горно-Алтайской, Карачаево-Черкесской и Хакасской автономных областей в Советские Социалистические Республики в составе РСФСР». (Supreme Soviet of the RSFSR. Law #1539-I of 3 July 1923 On the Process of Transformation of Adyghe, Mountain Altai, Karachay-Cherkess, and Khakass Autonomous Oblasts into Soviet Socialist Republics Within the RSFSR. ).
- Верховный Совет Республики Хакасия. Закон №06-ЗРХ от 11 февраля 2015 г. «О государственном гимне Республики Хакасия». Вступил в силу 14 февраля 2015 г. Опубликован: "Хакасия", №26, 14 февраля 2015 г. (Supreme Council of the Republic of Khakassia. Law #06-ZRKh of 11 February 2015 On the State Anthem of the Republic of Khakassia. Effective as of 14 February 2015.).
