= List of members of the Federation Council (Russia) =

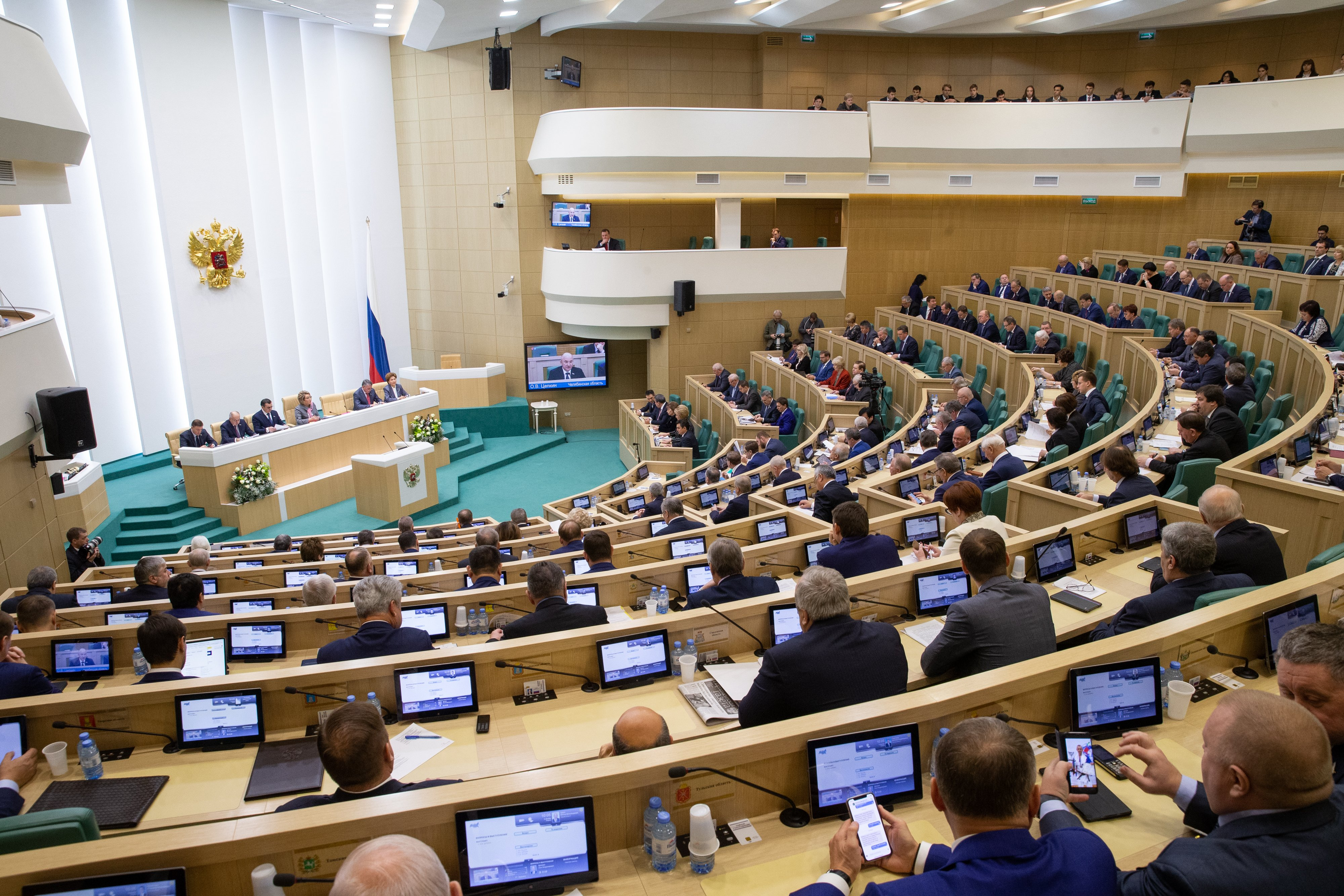
Members of the Federation Council in session

The Federation Council (Russian: Совет Федерации) is the upper house of the Federal Assembly of Russia, the parliament of the Russian Federation. Each of the 89 federal subjects of Russia – consisting of 24 republics, 48 oblasts, nine krais, three federal cities, four autonomous okrugs, and one autonomous oblast – sends two senators to the Council, for a total membership of 178 senators. (Note: The federal subjects of Russia include several territories that are not internationally recognized as part of Russia. The Republic of Crimea and Sevastopol were annexed in 2014, and Donetsk People's Republic, Luhansk People's Republic, Zaporizhzhia Oblast and Kherson Oblast in 2022.)

Of the two senators from each federal subject, one represents the subject's legislative (representative) authority and the other the subject's executive authority. The current structure of the Federation Council was established through federal law on 8 August 2000. The senator representing the executive authority is appointed by the chief government official in that constituent entity, in effect the region's governor or head. The senator representing the legislative authority is elected by that body for the duration of its term. Senators are appointed to serve on a full-time basis.

== Current members ==
Territories that are internationally recognised as part of Ukraine are highlighted in beige.

Federal subject	Executive		Legislative	
Federal subject	Senator	Party	Senator	Party
Republics
Adygea	Alexander Narolin	United Russia	Murat Khapsirokov	United Russia
Altai	Amyr Argamakov	United Russia	Artur Kokhoyev	United Russia
Bashkortostan	Lilia Gumerova	United Russia	Oleg Golov	United Russia
Buryatia	Albina Kirillova	Independent	Alexander Varfolomeev	United Russia
Chechnya	Suleiman Geremeyev	United Russia	Mokhmad Akhmadov	United Russia
Chuvashia	Nikolay Fyodorov	United Russia	Nikolay Vladimirov	United Russia
Crimea	Yury Nimchenko	Independent	Sergey Karjakin	United Russia
Dagestan	Ilyas Umakhanov	United Russia	Suleyman Kerimov	United Russia
Donetsk People's Republic	Nataliya Nikonorova	United Russia	Aleksandr Voloshin	United Russia
Ingushetia	Mikhail Ilezov	United Russia	Belan Khamchiev	United Russia
Kabardino-Balkaria	Arsen Kanokov	United Russia	Mukharby Ulbashev	United Russia
Kalmykia	Boris Khachirov	United Russia	Bayir Puteyev	United Russia
Karachay-Cherkessia	Krym Kazanokov	United Russia	Akhmat Salpagarov	United Russia
Karelia	Vladimir Chizhov	Independent	Igor Zubarev	United Russia
Khakassia	Oleg Zemtsov	Independent	Alexander Zhukov	United Russia
Komi	Vladimir Dzhabarov	United Russia	Ekaterina Gribkova	United Russia
Luhansk People's Republic	Esedulla Abachev	Independent	Olga Bas	United Russia
Mari El	Konstantin Kosachev	United Russia	Sergey Martynov	Independent
Mordovia	Andrey Kelin	Independent	Olga Makedonskaya	United Russia
North Ossetia	Taimuraz Mamsurov	United Russia	Vitaly Nazarenko	United Russia
Tatarstan	Timur Nagumanov	United Russia	Gennady Emelyanov	United Russia
Tuva	Lyudmila Narusova	Independent	Sholban Kuzhuget	United Russia
Udmurtia	Lyubov Glebova	United Russia	Yury Fedorov	United Russia
Yakutia	Yegor Borisov	United Russia	Sakhamin Afanasyev	United Russia
Krais
Altai Krai	Natalya Kuvshinova	United Russia	Victor Zobnev	United Russia
Kamchatka Krai	Boris Nevzorov	United Russia	Valery Ponomarev	United Russia
Khabarovsk Krai	Andrei Seryozhnikov	Independent	Viktor Kalashnikov	United Russia
Krasnodar Krai	Aleksey Kondratenko	United Russia	Alexander Trembitsky	United Russia
Krasnoyarsk Krai	Andrey Klishas	United Russia	Sergey Ponomarenko	United Russia
Perm Krai	Vyacheslav Grigoryev	United Russia	Alexei Pushkov	Independent
Primorsky Krai	Aleksandr Rolik	United Russia	Zhanna Gudkova	United Russia
Stavropol Krai	Mikhail Afanasov	United Russia	Gennady Yagubov	United Russia
Zabaykalsky Krai	Bair Zhamsuyev	United Russia	Sergey Mikhailov	United Russia
Oblasts
Amur Oblast	Ivan Abramov	Liberal Democratic	Artem Sheikin	United Russia
Arkhangelsk Oblast	Yury Borisov	Independent	Ivan Novikov	United Russia
Astrakhan Oblast	Andrey Derkach	Independent	Aleksandr Khodayev	United Russia
Belgorod Oblast	Aleksandr Lorenz	Independent	Anna Kocherova	United Russia
Bryansk Oblast	Sergey Melikov	United Russia	Vasily Popadaylo	United Russia
Chelyabinsk Oblast	Natalya Kotova	United Russia	Oleg Tsepkin	United Russia
Irkutsk Oblast	Andrey Chernyshev	United Russia	Sergei Brilka	United Russia
Ivanovo Oblast	Vladimir Bulavin	Independent	Valery Vasilyev	United Russia
Kaliningrad Oblast	Alexander Shenderyuk–Zhidkov	Independent	Alexander Yaroshuk	United Russia
Kaluga Oblast	Anatoly Artamonov	United Russia	Alexander Savin	United Russia
Kemerovo Oblast	Aleksei Sinitsyn	United Russia	Nadezhda Ilyina	United Russia
Kherson	Konstantin Basyuk	United Russia	Igor Kastyukevich	United Russia
Kirov Oblast	Viktor Bondarev	United Russia	Vyacheslav Timchenko	United Russia
Kostroma Oblast	Nikolai Zhuravlev	United Russia	Svetlana Kirillova	United Russia
Kurgan Oblast	Yelena Perminova	United Russia	Sergey Muratov	United Russia
Kursk Oblast	Yevgeniya Lamonova	United Russia	Alexander Bryksin	Independent
Leningrad Oblast	Sergey Perminov	United Russia	Dmitry Vasilenko	United Russia
Lipetsk Oblast	Yevgenia Uvarkina	Independent	Yevgeny Savvin	United Russia
Magadan Oblast	Nikolai Yezhov	Independent	Sergey Ivanov	United Russia
Moscow Oblast	Igor Treskov	United Russia	Alexander Dvoinykh	United Russia
Murmansk Oblast	Yelena Dyagileva	United Russia	Ivan Khrustalyov	Independent
Nizhny Novgorod Oblast	Aleksandr Shchyolokov	United Russia	Olga Shchetinina	United Russia
Novgorod Oblast	Yevgeny Dietrich	United Russia	Elena Pisareva	United Russia
Novosibirsk Oblast	Vladimir Gorodetsky	United Russia	Aleksandr Karelin	United Russia
Omsk Oblast	Ivan Yevstifeyev	United Russia	Oksana Fadina	United Russia
Orenburg Oblast	Yelena Afanasyeva	Liberal Democratic	Andrey Shevchenko	United Russia
Oryol Oblast	Vadim Sokolov	United Russia	Vasily Ikonnikov	Communist
Penza Oblast	Nikolay Kondratyuk	Independent	Yulia Lazutkina	United Russia
Pskov Oblast	Alexey Naumets	United Russia	Natalya Melnikova	United Russia
Rostov Oblast	Andrey Yatskin	Independent	Vasily Golubev	United Russia
Ryazan Oblast	Sergei Anopriyenko	Independent	Igor Murog	United Russia
Sakhalin Oblast	Grigory Karasin	Independent	Andrey Khapochkin	United Russia
Samara Oblast	Marina Sidukhina	United Russia	Vladimir Koshelev	United Russia
Saratov Oblast	Andrey Denisov	United Russia	Valery Radayev	United Russia
Smolensk Oblast	Yury Vorobyov	United Russia	Artyom Malashchenkov	United Russia
Sverdlovsk Oblast	Viktor Sheptiy	United Russia	Aleksey Orlov	United Russia
Tambov Oblast	Aleksey Kondratyev	United Russia	Aleksey Puchnin	Independent
Tomsk Oblast	Viktor Kress	United Russia	Vladimir Kravchenko	United Russia
Tula Oblast	Nikolay Vorobyov	United Russia	Mikhail Borshchyov	United Russia
Tver Oblast	Alexey Meshkov	Independent	Andrei Yepishin	United Russia
Tyumen Oblast	Vladimir Yakushev	United Russia	Dmitry Goritsky	United Russia
Ulyanovsk Oblast	Ayrat Gibatdinov	Communist	Sergey Ryabukhin	United Russia
Vladimir Oblast	Andrey Shokhin	United Russia	Vladimir Kiselyov	United Russia
Volgograd Oblast	Nikolai Semisotov	United Russia	Sergei Gornyakov	United Russia
Vologda Oblast	Sergey Sorokin	United Russia	Roman Maslov	United Russia
Voronezh Oblast	Galina Karelova	United Russia	Vladimir Netyosov	United Russia
Yaroslavl Oblast	Aleksandr Rusakov	Independent	Natalia Kosikhina	United Russia
Zaporozhye Oblast	Dmitry Rogozin	Independent	vacant	TBD
Autonomous okrugs
Chukotka	Anna Otke	United Russia	Sergey Karginov	Liberal Democratic
Khanty-Mansi Autonomous Okrug	Natalya Komarova	United Russia	Alexander Noviukhov	United Russia
Nenets Autonomous Okrug	Denis Gusev	United Russia	Aleksandr Lutovinov	United Russia
Yamalo-Nenets Autonomous Okrug	Vladimir Pushkaryov	United Russia	Alexey Sitnikov	United Russia
Autonomous oblast
Jewish Autonomous Oblast	Natalya Khorova	Independent	Svetlana Lukash	United Russia
Federal cities
Moscow	Vladimir Kozhin	Independent	Inna Svyatenko	United Russia
Saint Petersburg	Valentina Matviyenko	United Russia	Andrey Kutepov	United Russia
Sevastopol	Yekaterina Altabayeva	United Russia	Larisa Melnik	United Russia

== By federal subject (since 2000) ==
=== Republics ===
==== Adygea ====
Executive
Senator	Term start	Term end
Andrey Vorobyov	6 March 2002	7 December 2003
Vyacheslav Shverikas	28 January 2004	January 2017
Oleg Seleznyov	10 September 2017	6 October 2021
Alexander Narolin	14 December 2021	incumbent

Legislative
Senator	Term start	Term end
Adam Tleuzh	18 April 2001	2 February 2007
Aslan Khashir	2 February 2007	August 2011
Nurbiy Samogov	24 August 2011	February 2012
Murat Khapsirokov	8 February 2012	incumbent

==== Altai ====
Executive
Senator	Term start	Term end
Mikhail Gnezdilov	15 February 2001	19 February 2002
Boris Agapov	19 February 2002	12 October 2005
Viktor Lopatnikov	3 March 2006	30 September 2014
Vladimir Poletaev	30 September 2014	3 October 2024
Amyr Argamakov	3 October 2024	incumbent

Legislative
Senator	Term start	Term end
Yury Antaradonov	19 February 2002	5 June 2002
Ralif Safin	5 June 2002	30 September 2014
Tatyana Gigel	30 September 2014	26 September 2024
Artur Kokhoyev	26 September 2024	incumbent

==== Bashkortostan ====
Executive
Senator	Term start	Term end
Aleksandr Yakubov	21 December 2001	25 February 2004
Rudik Iskuzhin	25 February 2004	27 December 2006
Ramil Iskuzhin	27 December 2006	7 December 2007
Rafael Baydavletov	16 April 2008	24 December 2010
Ayrat Gaskarov	24 December 2010	15 March 2011
Anatoly Bondaruk	15 March 2011	25 September 2014
Lilia Gumerova	25 September 2014	incumbent

Legislative
Senator	Term start	Term end
Igor Izmestyev	21 December 2001	13 December 2006
Rudik Iskuzhin	27 December 2006	3 October 2013
Rafali Zinurov	3 October 2013	28 September 2018
Irek Yalalov	28 September 2018	5 October 2023
Oleg Golov	5 October 2023	incumbent

==== Buryatia ====
Executive
Senator	Term start	Term end
Vladimir Agalov	26 December 2000	1 January 2004
Vitaly Malkin	1 January 2004	4 April 2013
Arnold Tulokhonov	4 April 2013	16 February 2017
Tatyana Mantatova	16 February 2017	22 September 2017
Vyacheslav Nagovitsyn	22 September 2017	22 October 2025
Albina Kirillova	23 October 2025	incumbent

Legislative
Senator	Term start	Term end
Yury Skuratov (Note: Never took office)	19 November 2001	28 November 2001
Vladimir Bavlov	18 December 2001	1 July 2004
Innokenty Yegorov	22 December 2004	18 September 2013
Alexander Varfolomeev	18 September 2013	incumbent

==== Chechnya ====
Executive
Senator	Term start	Term end
Akhmar Zavgayev	24 October 2000	7 December 2003
Umar Dzhabrailov	14 January 2004	7 October 2009
Suleiman Geremeyev	3 February 2010	incumbent

Legislative
Senator	Term start	Term end
Adnan Muzykayev	10 July 2003	11 December 2003
Musa Umarov	11 December 2003	26 November 2008
Ziyad Sabsabi	26 November 2008	6 November 2019
Mokhmad Akhmadov	14 November 2019	incumbent

==== Chuvashia ====
Executive
Senator	Term start	Term end
Vladimir Sloutsker	18 January 2002	22 September 2010
Nikolay Fyodorov	22 September 2010	23 May 2012
Galina Nikolayeva	5 July 2012	15 December 2014
Konstantin Kosachev	15 December 2014	15 September 2015
Nikolay Fyodorov	15 September 2015	incumbent

Legislative
Senator	Term start	Term end
Vyacheslav Borovik	7 September 2001	10 September 2002
Leonid Lebedev	10 September 2002	June 2015
Vadim Nikolaev	11 June 2015	29 September 2021
Nikolay Vladimirov	29 September 2021	incumbent

==== Crimea ====
Executive
Senator	Term start	Term end
Olga Kovitidi	15 April 2014	12 September 2024
Yury Nimchenko	12 September 2024	incumbent

Legislative
Senator	Term start	Term end
Sergei Tsekov	24 September 2014	10 September 2024
Sergey Karjakin	12 September 2024	incumbent

==== Donetsk People's Republic ====
Executive
Senator	Term start	Term end
Nataliya Nikonorova	20 December 2022	incumbent

Legislative
Senator	Term start	Term end
Alexander Ananchenko	20 December 2022	20 September 2023
Aleksandr Voloshin	20 September 2023	incumbent

==== Dagestan ====
Executive
Senator	Term start	Term end
Ilyas Umakhanov	29 November 2001	incumbent

Legislative
Senator	Term start	Term end
Shamil Zainalov	29 November 2001	24 March 2006
Atay Aliyev	24 March 2006	7 December 2007
Suleyman Kerimov	20 February 2008	incumbent

==== Ingushetia ====
Executive
Senator	Term start	Term end
Ruslan Aushev	10 January 2002	23 April 2002
Issa Kostoyev	1 July 2002	13 May 2009
Mukharbek Didigov	13 May 2009	21 December 2011
Nikita Ivanov	30 December 2011	9 September 2013
Mukharbek Didigov	9 September 2013	9 September 2018
Musa Chiliyev	9 September 2018	September 2019
Mukharbek Barakhoyev	8 September 2019	9 September 2024
Mikhail Ilezov	9 September 2024	incumbent

Legislative
Senator	Term start	Term end
Sergey Bekov	20 March 2001	15 October 2002
Igor Kamenskoy	19 October 2002	11 March 2004
Vasily Likhachyov	11 March 2004	3 March 2010
Musa Keligov	25 March 2010	22 May 2010
Akhmet Palankoyev	9 June 2010	December 2016
Belan Khamchiev	3 October 2016	incumbent

==== Kabardino-Balkaria ====
Executive
Senator	Term start	Term end
Mukharby Ulbashev	24 December 2001	3 February 2004
Khuseyn Chechenov	3 February 2004	December 2010
Ilyas Bechelov	December 2010	10 October 2014
Arsen Kanokov	10 October 2014	incumbent

Legislative
Senator	Term start	Term end
Khachim Karmokov	1 June 2001	13 May 2009
Albert Kazharov	13 May 2009	14 August 2013
Fatima Ivanova	26 September 2013	18 December 2013
Arsen Kanokov	25 December 2013	10 October 2014
Mukharby Ulbashev	11 October 2014	incumbent

==== Kalmykia ====
Executive
Senator	Term start	Term end
Rustem Iskhakov	21 December 2001	23 November 2005
Mikhail Kapura	23 November 2005	November 2012
Batu Khasikov	21 November 2012	September 2014
Yury Biryukov	22 September 2014	21 September 2019
Aleksey Orlov	23 October 2019	21 September 2024
Boris Khachirov	21 September 2024	incumbent

Legislative
Senator	Term start	Term end
Igor Provkin	21 December 2001	28 October 2004
Levon Chakhmakhchyan	26 November 2004	23 June 2006
Konstantin Pirtskhalava	December 2007	3 February 2010
Konstantin Tsitsin	7 July 2006	16 November 2007
Vladimir Babichev	3 February 2010	15 December 2010
Alexei Mayorov	5 July 2011	7 November 2023
Bayir Puteyev	7 November 2023	incumbent

==== Karachay-Cherkessia ====
Executive
Senator	Term start	Term end
Stanislav Derev	16 November 2001	4 June 2004
Oleg Shurdumov	4 June 2004	17 June 2009
Ratmir Aybazov	17 June 2009	7 April 2011
Vyacheslav Derev	7 April 2011	January 2016
Krym Kazanokov	February 2016	September 2016
Rauf Arashukov	18 September 2016	22 May 2019
Krym Kazanokov	25 June 2019	incumbent

Legislative
Senator	Term start	Term end
Ratmir Aybazov	16 November 2001	June 2009
Zubar Dokshokov	December 2009	April 2011
Murat Suyunchev	April 2011	June 2015
Akhmat Salpagarov	9 June 2015	incumbent

==== Karelia ====
Executive
Senator	Term start	Term end
Viktor Stepanov	14 December 2001	7 April 2006
Andrey Nelidov	7 April 2006	3 March 2010
Devletkhan Alikhanov	17 March 2010	22 September 2010
Sergey Katanandov	22 September 2010	25 September 2017
Alexander Rakitin	26 September 2017	29 September 2022
Vladimir Chizhov	29 September 2022	incumbent

Legislative
Senator	Term start	Term end
Yury Ponomaryov	28 December 2001	1 January 2003
Vladimir Fedorov	4 January 2003	7 October 2016
Igor Zubarev	7 October 2016	incumbent

==== Khakassia ====
Executive
Senator	Term start	Term end
Valentina Petrenko	26 April 2001	25 November 2011
Valery Usatyuk	16 November 2018	19 September 2023
Oleg Zemtsov	19 September 2023	incumbent

Legislative
Senator	Term start	Term end
Arkady Sarkisyan	26 April 2001	2 June 2006
Yevgeny Serebrennikov	25 September 2006	September 2018
Alexander Zhukov	27 February 2019	incumbent

==== Komi ====
Executive
Senator	Term start	Term end
Yury Volkov	25 April 2001	23 January 2002
Rakhim Azimov	27 February 2002	11 February 2003
Aleksey Grishin	11 February 2003	28 October 2004
Igor Vasilyev	28 October 2004	3 March 2010
Vladimir Torlopov	3 March 2010	January 2014
Dmitry Shatokhin	22 September 2016	September 2020
Olga Yepifanova	23 September 2020	30 September 2025
Vladimir Dzhabarov	30 September 2025	incumbent

Legislative
Senator	Term start	Term end
Yevgeny Trofimov	21 December 2001	21 April 2011
Yevgeny Shumeyko	April 2011	December 2011
Yevgeny Samoylov	20 December 2011	15 October 2014
Valery Zhilin	24 October 2014	15 October 2015
Valery Markov	15 October 2015	24 September 2020
Elena Shumilova	24 September 2020	16 June 2025
Ekaterina Gribkova	29 September 2025	incumbent

==== Lugansk People's Republic ====
Executive
Senator	Term start	Term end
Darya Lantratova	20 December 2022	20 September 2026
Esedulla Abachev	26 October 2026	incumbent

Legislative
Senator	Term start	Term end
Olga Bas	20 December 2022	incumbent

==== Mari El ====
Executive
Senator	Term start	Term end
Aleksandr Torshin	26 January 2001	20 January 2015
Svetlana Solntseva	29 January 2015	September 2015
Konstantin Kosachev	21 September 2015	incumbent

Legislative
Senator	Term start	Term end
Ilya Lomakin-Rumyantsev	29 March 2001	30 March 2004
Natalya Dementyeva	10 June 2004	7 October 2019
Sergey Martynov	7 October 2019	incumbent

==== Mordovia ====
Executive
Senator	Term start	Term end
Leonid Nevzlin	30 November 2001	27 March 2003
Nikolai Bychkov	27 March 2003	25 November 2004
Aleksandr Smirnov	13 April 2005	22 April 2013
Nikolai Petrushkin	22 April 2013	May 2017
Sergei Kislyak	20 September 2017	25 September 2026
Andrey Kelin	25 September 2026	incumbent

Legislative
Senator	Term start	Term end
German Petrov	1 December 2001	3 December 2004
Vladimir Lityushkin	3 December 2004	29 September 2021
Peter Tultaev	29 September 2021	14 October 2026
Olga Makedonskaya	14 October 2026	incumbent

==== North Ossetia-Alania ====
Executive
Senator	Term start	Term end
Erik Bugulov	19 February 2002	22 June 2005
Alexander Dzasokhov	22 June 2005	22 September 2010
Oleg Khatsayev	22 September 2010	29 September 2015
Taimuraz Mamsurov	14 September 2015	incumbent

Legislative
Senator	Term start	Term end
Valery Kadokhov	9 November 2000	28 November 2012
Aleksandr Totoonov	28 November 2012	22 September 2017
Arsen Fadzayev	22 September 2017	29 September 2022
Vitaly Nazarenko	29 September 2022	incumbent

==== Tatarstan ====
Executive
Senator	Term start	Term end
Rafgat Altynbayev	11 May 2001	11 April 2003
Filza Khamidullin	11 April 2003	11 May 2005
Ekzam Gubaydullin	11 May 2005	19 December 2012
Sergey Batin	19 December 2012	September 2015
Oleg Morozov	18 September 2015	18 September 2020
Lenar Safin	18 September 2020	20 August 2022
Aleksandr Terentyev	22 September 2022	19 September 2025
Timur Nagumanov	19 September 2025	incumbent

Legislative
Senator	Term start	Term end
Irina Larochkina	17 January 2002	6 May 2005
Alexey Pakhomov	8 June 2005	1 December 2011
Vagiz Mingazov	1 December 2011	23 June 2014
Ildus Akhmetzyanov	1 October 2014	2 October 2019
Gennady Emelyanov	2 October 2019	incumbent

==== Tuva ====
Executive
Senator	Term start	Term end
Sergei Pugachev	24 December 2001	3 January 2011
Galina Munzuk	2 April 2011	5 October 2014
Mergen Oorzhak	6 October 2014	September 2016
Lyudmila Narusova	23 September 2016	incumbent

Legislative
Senator	Term start	Term end
Chamyr Udumbara	24 December 2001	8 October 2002
Lyudmila Narusova	8 October 2002	13 October 2010
Aleksey Pimanov	17 January 2011	14 October 2013
Oner Ondar	21 December 2013	October 2014
Oksana Buriko	27 October 2014	14 October 2019
Dina Oyun	14 October 2019	27 March 2025
Sholban Kuzhuget	21 May 2025	incumbent

==== Udmurtia ====
Executive
Senator	Term start	Term end
Viktor Shudegov	17 April 2001	7 December 2007
Alexander Chekalin	12 May 2008	17 September 2017
Lyubov Glebova	17 September 2017	incumbent

Legislative
Senator	Term start	Term end
Anatoly Saltykov	17 April 2001	23 April 2003
Viktor Khoroshavtsev	23 April 2003	23 January 2009
Vladimir Shcherbakov	13 May 2009	21 October 2012
Alexander Solovyov	April 2013	26 February 2014
Alexander Volkov	17 March 2014	20 May 2017
Yury Fedorov	26 September 2017	incumbent

==== Yakutia ====
Executive
Senator	Term start	Term end
Mikhail Nikolayev	28 January 2002	23 June 2010
Vyacheslav Shtyrov	23 June 2010	28 September 2018
Yegor Borisov	28 September 2018	incumbent

Legislative
Senator	Term start	Term end
Robert Burnashov	28 January 2002	23 January 2003
Aleksandr Matveyev	23 January 2003	2 October 2013
Aleksandr Akimov	2 October 2013	4 October 2023
Sakhamin Afanasyev	4 October 2023	incumbent

=== Krais ===
==== Altai Krai ====
Executive
Senator	Term start	Term end
Vladimir Germanenko	20 December 2001	14 March 2004
Timur Timerbulatov	27 May 2004	25 January 2006
Igor Slyunyayev	25 January 2006	25 October 2007
Yury Shamkov	20 February 2008	26 September 2014
Mikhail Shchetinin	26 September 2014	17 September 2018
Alexander Karlin	17 September 2018	19 September 2023
Natalya Kuvshinova	19 September 2023	incumbent

Legislative
Senator	Term start	Term end
Sergey Opyonyshev	20 December 2001	27 May 2004
Vladimir Germanenko	27 May 2004	29 December 2008
Sergey Belousov	29 December 2008	September 2021
Victor Zobnev	7 October 2021	incumbent

==== Kamchatka Krai ====
Executive
Senator	Term start	Term end
Viktor Orlov	February 2008	10 January 2012
Boris Nevzorov	10 January 2012	incumbent

Legislative
Senator	Term start	Term end
Boris Sorokin	February 2008	April 2011
Valery Ponomarev	11 December 2011	incumbent

==== Khabarovsk Krai ====
Executive
Senator	Term start	Term end
Andrey Chirkin	15 December 2001	2005
Yury Solonin	9 February 2005	May 2013
Alexander Shishkin	18 September 2013	28 September 2018
Yelena Greshnyakova	28 September 2018	24 September 2021
Andrey Bazilevsky	24 September 2021	13 September 2024
Andrei Seryozhnikov	13 September 2024	incumbent

Legislative
Senator	Term start	Term end
Viktor Ozerov	15 December 2001	23 October 2019
Dmitry Priyatnov	23 October 2019	31 October 2019
Sergey Bezdenezhnykh	5 December 2019	26 September 2024
Viktor Kalashnikov	26 September 2024	incumbent

==== Krasnodar Krai ====
Executive
Senator	Term start	Term end
Nikolai Kondratenko	11 January 2001	7 December 2003
Leonid Mostovoy	29 December 2003	8 December 2004
Farkhad Akhmedov	8 December 2004	6 June 2007
Alexander Pochinok	6 June 2007	14 October 2011
Akhmed Bilalov	14 October 2011	7 November 2012
Vitaly Ignatenko	7 November 2012	22 September 2015
Aleksey Kondratenko	22 September 2015	incumbent

Legislative
Senator	Term start	Term end
Konstantin Meremyanin	1 January 2002	10 January 2003
Aleksey Shishkov	10 January 2003	30 January 2008
Nikolai Kondratenko	30 January 2008	27 November 2013
Evgeny Gromyko	22 January 2014	25 July 2015
Vladimir Kharlamov	25 November 2015	15 September 2017
Vladimir Beketov	28 September 2017	28 September 2022
Alexander Trembitsky	27 October 2022	incumbent

==== Krasnoyarsk Krai ====
Executive
Senator	Term start	Term end
Pavel Fedirko	2 November 2001	25 May 2004
Igor Kamenskoy	25 May 2004	16 November 2009
Viktor Zubarev	25 December 2009	20 May 2010
Vera Oskina	14 July 2010	16 March 2012
Andrey Klishas	19 March 2012	incumbent

Legislative
Senator	Term start	Term end
Vyacheslav Novikov	10 January 2002	5 March 2014
Valery Semyonov	3 April 2014	24 May 2023
Aleksandr Uss	8 June 2023	1 October 2026
Sergey Ponomarenko	1 October 2026	incumbent

==== Perm Krai ====
Executive
Senator	Term start	Term end
Oleg Chirkunov	January 2001	March 2004
Tatyana Popova	April 2004	July 2007
Sergei Gordeev	19 July 2007	1 December 2010
Igor Shubin	24 December 2010	January 2012
Alexander Pochinok	31 January 2012	2 July 2012
Andrey Klimov	2 July 2012	18 September 2025
Vyacheslav Grigoryev	18 September 2025	incumbent

Legislative
Senator	Term start	Term end
Oganes Oganyan	January 2001	4 December 2011
Igor Shubin	16 February 2012	29 September 2016
Alexei Pushkov	29 September 2016	incumbent

==== Primorsky Krai ====
Executive
Senator	Term start	Term end
Valery Manilov	29 August 2001	28 January 2004
Igor Ivanov	28 January 2004	26 May 2006
Viktor Kondratov	8 December 2006	28 April 2010
Galust Akhoyan	17 March 2010	23 March 2010
Vladimir Kikot	28 April 2010	12 June 2012
Tatyana Zabolotnaya	12 June 2012	22 September 2014
Svetlana Goryacheva	22 September 2014	15 September 2023
Aleksandr Rolik	15 September 2023	incumbent

Legislative
Senator	Term start	Term end
Mikhail Glubokovsky	30 January 2002	27 November 2002
Oleg Kozhemyako	27 November 2002	29 September 2004
Igor Pushkaryov	24 November 2004	23 May 2008
Viacheslav Fetisov	27 October 2008	5 October 2016
Lyudmila Talabayeva	5 October 2016	21 October 2026
Zhanna Gudkova	21 October 2026	incumbent

==== Stavropol Krai ====
Executive
Senator	Term start	Term end
Anatoly Korobeynikov	25 January 2001	16 December 2009
Yelena Sagal	25 December 2009	17 August 2012
Mikhail Afanasov	17 August 2012	September 2019
Sergey Melikov	27 September 2019	5 October 2020
Mikhail Afanasov	14 October 2020	incumbent

Legislative
Senator	Term start	Term end
Aleksey Lysyakov	21 February 2002	13 December 2011
Konstantin Skomorokhin	13 December 2011	6 October 2016
Valery Gayevsky	6 October 2016	30 September 2021
Gennady Yagubov	30 September 2021	incumbent

==== Zabaykalsky Krai ====
Executive
Senator	Term start	Term end
Bato-Zhargal Zhambalnimbuyev	15 December 2010	17 September 2013
Bair Zhamsuyev	18 September 2013	incumbent

Legislative
Senator	Term start	Term end
Konstantin Surkov	15 December 2010	16 September 2013
Stepan Zhiryakov	16 October 2013	8 October 2018
Sergey Mikhailov	8 October 2018	incumbent

=== Oblasts ===
==== Amur Oblast ====
Executive
Senator	Term start	Term end
Aleksandr Karpov	20 September 2001	22 June 2005
Igor Rogachyov	22 June 2005	7 April 2012
Amir Gallyamov	11 July 2007	19 September 2007
Nikolai Savelyev	24 December 2012	21 September 2015
Aleksandr Suvorov	21 September 2015	27 September 2018
Ivan Abramov	27 September 2018	incumbent

Legislative
Senator	Term start	Term end
Galina Buslova	14 December 2001	19 September 2007
Eduard Yanakov	16 June 2005	17 June 2005
Yury Averyanov	21 February 2006	23 May 2006
Amir Gallyamov	19 September 2007	18 December 2011
Pavel Maslovsky	18 December 2011	15 October 2014
Yury Kushnar	23 October 2014	23 September 2016
Aleksandr Koryakov	26 September 2016	28 September 2021
Artem Sheikin	28 September 2021	incumbent

==== Arkhangelsk Oblast ====
Executive
Senator	Term start	Term end
Mikhail Korobeynikov	3 December 2001	15 September 2004
Aleksandr Tishchenko	15 September 2004	15 October 2008
Nikolay Kiselyov	28 May 2008	15 October 2008
Nikolai Lvov	15 October 2008	15 March 2012
Konstantin Dobrynin	15 March 2012	25 September 2015
Viktor Pavlenko	25 September 2015	9 October 2020
Alexander Nekrasov	9 October 2020	29 January 2025
Yury Borisov	19 May 2025	incumbent

Legislative
Senator	Term start	Term end
Yury Sivkov	11 December 2001	14 October 2007
Vladimir Rushailo	7 December 2007	25 September 2013
Lyudmila Kononova	16 October 2013	21 September 2018
Viktor Novozhilov	21 September 2018	22 September 2023
Ivan Novikov	22 September 2023	incumbent

==== Astrakhan Oblast ====
Executive
Senator	Term start	Term end
Konstantin Markelov	15 February 2001	4 February 2005
Yury Chaplin	25 February 2005	19 September 2014
Igor Martynov	19 September 2014	27 September 2016
Alexander Bashkin	27 September 2016	13 September 2024
Andrey Derkach	13 September 2024	incumbent

Legislative
Senator	Term start	Term end
Gennady Gorbunov	25 December 2001	26 September 2016
Gennady Ordenov	26 September 2016	23 September 2026
Aleksandr Khodayev	23 September 2026	incumbent

==== Belgorod Oblast ====
Executive
Senator	Term start	Term end
Aleksandr Dondukov	28 December 2001	17 September 2003
Nikolai Ryzhkov	17 September 2003	25 September 2023
Zhanna Chefranova	9 October 2023	2 October 2026
Aleksandr Lorenz	2 October 2026	incumbent

Legislative
Senator	Term start	Term end
Georgy Golikov	3 December 2001	7 December 2003
Sergey Popelnyukhov	24 December 2003	26 May 2006
Vadim Moshkovich	26 May 2006	15 December 2014
Ivan Kulabukhov	January 2015	22 September 2020
Yevgeny Savchenko	22 September 2020	4 June 2024
Taras Khtey	27 June 2024	25 September 2025
Anna Kocherova	25 September 2025	incumbent

==== Bryansk Oblast ====
Executive
Senator	Term start	Term end
Leonid Lushkin	30 January 2001	29 April 2004
Aleksandr Yakubov	29 April 2004	12 October 2005
Aleksandr Petrov	12 October 2005	29 September 2010
Lyudmila Narusova	13 October 2010	22 October 2012
Mikhail Marchenko	22 October 2012	29 September 2015
Sergey Kalashnikov	29 September 2015	23 September 2020
Vadim Dengin	23 September 2020	28 September 2026
Sergey Melikov	28 September 2026	incumbent

Legislative
Senator	Term start	Term end
Stepan Ponasov	26 December 2000	25 April 2001
Valentina Dyomina	25 April 2001	21 September 2005
Eduard Vasilishin	21 September 2005	27 January 2011
Aleksandr Petrov	28 April 2011	30 September 2014
Ekaterina Lakhova	30 September 2014	22 September 2020
Galina Solodun	22 September 2020	24 September 2024
Vasily Popadaylo	24 September 2024	incumbent

==== Chelyabinsk Oblast ====
Executive
Senator	Term start	Term end
Yevgeny Yeliseyev	29 March 2001	26 May 2010
Ruslan Gattarov	26 May 2010	19 February 2014
Irina Gecht	24 September 2014	10 July 2019
Margarita Pavlova	20 September 2019	21 September 2024
Natalya Kotova	21 September 2024	incumbent

Legislative
Senator	Term start	Term end
Aleksandr Aristov	29 March 2001	28 January 2004
Vladislav Zhiganov	27 February 2004	22 June 2005
Andrey Komarov	21 September 2005	December 2010
Konstantin Tsybko	30 December 2010	September 2015
Oleg Tsepkin	24 September 2015	incumbent

==== Irkutsk Oblast ====
Executive
Senator	Term start	Term end
Dmitry Mezentsev	16 January 2002	8 June 2009
Vladimir Yakubovsky	18 November 2009	2 October 2012
Oleg Kankov	2 October 2012	3 October 2015
Vyacheslav Markhayev	3 October 2015	18 September 2020
Andrey Chernyshev	18 September 2020	incumbent

Legislative
Senator	Term start	Term end
Valentin Mezhevich	15 March 2001	25 September 2013
Vitaly Shuba	25 September 2013	20 September 2018
Sergei Brilka	20 September 2018	incumbent

==== Ivanovo Oblast ====
Executive
Senator	Term start	Term end
Vladimir Gusev	25 January 2001	28 April 2010
Yury Yablokov	23 June 2010	29 March 2011
Valery Vasilyev	29 March 2011	18 September 2023
Vladimir Bulavin	19 September 2023	incumbent

Legislative
Senator	Term start	Term end
Valentin Bakulin	9 January 2001	19 February 2004
Yury Smirnov	19 February 2004	September 2013
Sergey Pakhomov	14 September 2013	25 September 2013
Vladimir Bochkov	24 October 2013	27 September 2018
Viktor Smirnov	27 September 2018	September 2021
Alexander Gusakovsky	15 October 2021	18 September 2023
Valery Vasilyev	18 September 2023	incumbent

==== Kaliningrad Oblast ====
Executive
Senator	Term start	Term end
Valery Ustyugov	18 December 2000	14 August 2002
Aleksandr Skorobogatko	14 August 2002	7 December 2003
Oleg Tkach	22 January 2004	19 September 2022
Alexander Shenderyuk–Zhidkov	19 September 2022	incumbent

Legislative
Senator	Term start	Term end
Nikolai Tulayev	8 December 2000	9 June 2011
Nikolai Vlasenko	9 June 2011	March 2016
Aleksey Korotkov	13 October 2016	21 September 2021
Alexander Yaroshuk	21 October 2021	incumbent

==== Kaluga Oblast ====
Executive
Senator	Term start	Term end
Valery Sudarenkov	18 November 2000	September 2015
Yury Volkov	21 September 2015	22 January 2020
Anatoly Artamonov	14 February 2020	incumbent

Legislative
Senator	Term start	Term end
Viktor Kolesnikov	4 March 2001	7 December 2003
Aleksey Aleksandrov	12 April 2004	24 September 2020
Alexander Savin	24 September 2020	incumbent

==== Kemerovo Oblast ====
Executive
Senator	Term start	Term end
Sergey Shatirov	27 June 2001	September 2013
Aleksandr Lavrik	3 October 2013	17 September 2018
Aleksei Sinitsyn	17 September 2018	incumbent

Legislative
Senator	Term start	Term end
Svetlana Orlova	24 November 2001	17 September 2013
Sergey Shatirov	17 September 2013	14 September 2018
Dmitry Kuzmin	14 September 2018	13 September 2023
Nadezhda Ilyina	13 September 2023	incumbent

==== Kherson Oblast ====
Executive
Senator	Term start	Term end
Konstantin Basyuk	20 December 2022	incumbent

Legislative
Senator	Term start	Term end
Igor Kastyukevich	20 September 2023	incumbent

==== Kirov Oblast ====
Executive
Senator	Term start	Term end
Vladimir Sysolyatin	1 January 2002	13 November 2002
Sergey Ivanov	13 November 2002	25 March 2004
Aleksey Klishin	25 March 2004	1 April 2009
Nikolay Shaklein	1 April 2009	16 March 2012
Igor Igoshin	14 December 2012	20 December 2012
Svetlana Zhurova	16 March 2012	27 March 2013
Yuri Isupov	27 March 2013	24 September 2014
Vyacheslav Timchenko	24 September 2014	September 2016
Oleg Kazakovtsev	September 2016	September 2017
Viktor Bondarev	19 September 2017	incumbent

Legislative
Senator	Term start	Term end
Mikhail Mikheyev	9 April 2001	14 April 2004
Sergey Ivanov	14 April 2004	2 June 2006
Andrey Khazin	23 June 2006	28 April 2011
Oleg Kazakovtsev	28 April 2011	March 2016
Vyacheslav Timchenko	6 October 2016	incumbent

==== Kostroma Oblast ====
Executive
Senator	Term start	Term end
Ivan Starikov	25 January 2001	28 April 2004
Vasily Duma	13 May 2004	18 May 2011
Nikolai Zhuravlev	18 May 2011	incumbent

Legislative
Senator	Term start	Term end
Vyacheslav Vinogradov	7 June 2001	13 February 2004
Andrey Khazin	13 February 2004	8 February 2006
Aleksandr Ter-Avanesov	8 February 2006	27 November 2015
Mikhail Kozlov	27 November 2015	5 October 2020
Sergey Kalashnik	5 October 2020	8 October 2025
Svetlana Kirillova	8 October 2025	incumbent

==== Kurgan Oblast ====
Executive
Senator	Term start	Term end
Oleg Panteleyev	26 April 2001	26 September 2014
Yelena Perminova	26 September 2014	incumbent

Legislative
Senator	Term start	Term end
Andrey Vikharev	26 April 2001	29 June 2004
Sergey Lisovsky	29 June 2004	25 September 2020
Sergey Muratov	25 September 2020	incumbent

==== Kursk Oblast ====
Executive
Senator	Term start	Term end
Gennady Shirokonosov	23 November 2000	13 April 2005
Nina Tkachyova	13 April 2005	26 May 2006
Vitaly Bogdanov	23 June 2006	27 November 2018
Alexander Mikhailov	27 November 2018	4 December 2020
Grigory Rapota	17 May 2021	17 September 2024
Aleksey Kondratyev	17 September 2024	22 September 2025
Yevgeniya Lamonova	22 September 2025	incumbent

Legislative
Senator	Term start	Term end
Viktor Chernykh	30 January 2001	31 March 2005
Vitaly Bogdanov	13 April 2005	26 May 2006
Nina Tkachyova	26 May 2006	23 June 2011
Valery Ryazansky	23 June 2011	7 October 2021
Alexander Bryksin	7 October 2021	incumbent

==== Leningrad Oblast ====
Executive
Senator	Term start	Term end
Sergey Vasilyev	12 July 2001	3 September 2007
Andrey Molchanov	30 January 2008	28 December 2011
Vyacheslav Skvortsov	28 December 2011	3 September 2012
Igor Fomin	3 September 2012	17 September 2020
Sergey Perminov	17 September 2020	incumbent

Legislative
Senator	Term start	Term end
Alfred Koch	26 February 2002	23 April 2002
Valery Golubev	23 April 2002	25 February 2003
Damir Shadaev	24 June 2003	16 September 2003
Grigory Naginsky	16 September 2003	15 January 2010
Vyacheslav Skvortsov	22 December 2010	15 December 2011
Andrey Molchanov	15 December 2011	17 April 2013
Yevgeny Petelin	24 April 2013	5 October 2016
Dmitry Vasilenko	5 October 2016	incumbent

==== Lipetsk Oblast ====
Executive
Senator	Term start	Term end
Anatoly Lyskov	31 January 2002	26 September 2014
Irina Tikhonova	26 September 2014	7 November 2018
Oleg Korolyov	15 November 2018	23 June 2021
Dmitry Averov	29 June 2021	19 September 2021
Oksana Khlyakina	21 September 2021	17 September 2024
Yevgenia Uvarkina	17 September 2024	incumbent

Legislative
Senator	Term start	Term end
Maksim Kavdzharadze	25 December 2001	20 September 2026
Yevgeny Savvin	15 October 2026	incumbent

==== Magadan Oblast ====
Executive
Senator	Term start	Term end
Vladimir Kulakov	25 November 2000	1 August 2014
Anatoly Shirokov	10 October 2014	25 September 2025
Nikolay Yezhov	9 October 2025	incumbent

Legislative
Senator	Term start	Term end
Yuri Zasko	4 June 2001	25 September 2004
Vyacheslav Kalikyan	25 September 2004	2 May 2006
Sergey Ivanov	2 June 2006	incumbent

==== Moscow Oblast ====
Executive
Senator	Term start	Term end
Nikolai Churkin	1 January 2002	11 May 2012
Boris Gromov	11 May 2012	21 June 2013
Dmitry Sablin	16 September 2013	18 September 2016
Yury Lipatov	30 September 2016	17 September 2018
Aleksey Russkikh	17 September 2018	8 April 2021
Olga Zabralova	19 May 2021	26 September 2024
Igor Treskov	1 October 2024	incumbent

Legislative
Senator	Term start	Term end
Igor Bryntsalov	16 January 2002	8 December 2011
Valery Aksakov	29 October 2011	9 October 2014
Lidiya Antonova	9 October 2014	18 September 2016
Viktor Abramov	29 September 2016	30 September 2021
Alexander Dvoinykh	30 September 2021	incumbent

==== Murmansk Oblast ====
Executive
Senator	Term start	Term end
Andrey Guryev	23 November 2001	29 May 2013
Igor Chernyshenko	6 June 2013	27 September 2019
Konstantin Dolgov	27 September 2019	1 October 2024
Yelena Dyagileva	1 October 2024	incumbent

Legislative
Senator	Term start	Term end
Vyacheslav Popov	4 January 2002	15 December 2011
Vladimir Chub	24 December 2011	6 October 2016
Tatyana Kusayko	6 October 2016	6 October 2021
Tatiana Sakharova	7 October 2021	4 June 2025
Larisa Kruglova	23 September 2025	10 November 2026
Ivan Khrustalyov	18 November 2026	incumbent

==== Nizhny Novgorod Oblast ====
Executive
Senator	Term start	Term end
Yevgeny Bushmin	20 November 2001	21 September 2005
Aleksandr Podlesov	12 October 2005	10 November 2010
Valery Shnyakin	10 November 2010	25 September 2014
Vladimir Lebedev	25 September 2014	30 November 2023
Olga Shchetinina	13 December 2023	29 September 2026
Aleksandr Shchyolokov	6 November 2026	incumbent

Legislative
Senator	Term start	Term end
Anatoly Kozeradsky	29 November 2001	11 April 2002
Dmitry Bednyakov	11 April 2002	23 June 2006
Leonid Belov	23 June 2006	24 June 2011
Alexander Vainberg	23 June 2011	28 January 2026
Dmitry Krasnov	26 February 2026	29 September 2026
Olga Shchetinina	29 September 2026	incumbent

==== Novgorod Oblast ====
Executive
Senator	Term start	Term end
Gennady Burbulis	2 November 2001	16 November 2007
Aleksandr Korovnikov	16 November 2007	18 September 2016
Aleksey Kostyukov	28 September 2016	14 October 2017
Sergey Mitin	14 October 2017	15 October 2025
Yevgeny Dietrich	15 October 2025	incumbent

Legislative
Senator	Term start	Term end
Mikhail Sorokin	28 November 2001	26 December 2011
Dmitry Krivitsky	26 December 2011	28 September 2016
Sergey Fabrichny	28 September 2016	6 October 2021
Elena Pisareva	6 October 2021	incumbent

==== Novosibirsk Oblast ====
Executive
Senator	Term start	Term end
Viktor Ignatov	21 November 2001	27 February 2004
Anatoly Saltykov	27 February 2004	24 November 2010
Aleksei Bespalikov	24 November 2010	1 October 2014
Nadezhda Boltenko	1 October 2014	1 October 2018
Vladimir Gorodetsky	1 October 2018	incumbent

Legislative
Senator	Term start	Term end
Yury Alaferovsky	20 December 2001	25 January 2006
Viktor Leonov	25 January 2006	10 November 2010
Viktor Kosourov	10 November 2010	1 October 2015
Vladimir Laptev	10 December 2015	25 September 2020
Aleksandr Karelin	25 September 2020	incumbent

==== Omsk Oblast ====
Executive
Senator	Term start	Term end
Valery Tikhomirov	4 December 2001	17 February 2004
Valery Oyf	18 March 2004	17 June 2008
Aslambek Aslakhanov	11 July 2008	29 August 2012
Igor Zuga	29 August 2012	23 September 2015
Yelena Mizulina	23 September 2015	22 September 2023
Ivan Yevstifeyev	22 September 2023	incumbent

Legislative
Senator	Term start	Term end
Viktor Mironov	2 January 2002	16 May 2002
Valentin Chernyavsky	16 May 2002	14 December 2005
Mikhail Lapshin	8 February 2006	17 June 2006
Anatoly Tselik	21 September 2006	11 March 2007
Dmitri Alenichev	6 July 2007	10 November 2010
Aleksey Sokin	17 March 2011	December 2011
Andrey Golushko	19 July 2012	18 September 2016
Sergey Popov	29 September 2016	February 2018
Viktor Nazarov	15 March 2018	29 September 2021
Dmitry Perminov	29 September 2021	20 September 2026
Oksana Fadina	30 September 2026	incumbent

==== Orenburg Oblast ====
Executive
Senator	Term start	Term end
Aleksandr Zelepukhin	21 December 2001	21 April 2004
Nikolai Dolgushkin	21 April 2004	22 September 2010
Alexey Chernyshyov	22 September 2010	26 September 2014
Yelena Afanasyeva	26 September 2014	incumbent

Legislative
Senator	Term start	Term end
Viktor Nefyodov	21 December 2001	7 December 2003
Nikolai Pozhitkov	30 December 2003	27 September 2016
Andrey Shevchenko	27 September 2016	incumbent

==== Oryol Oblast ====
Executive
Senator	Term start	Term end
Pavel Merkulov	28 December 2001	21 May 2004
Marina Rogacheva	21 May 2004	16 February 2009
Yegor Stroyev	25 March 2009	24 September 2014
Vladimir Krugly	26 September 2014	15 September 2023
Vadim Sokolov	15 September 2023	incumbent

Legislative
Senator	Term start	Term end
Sergey Shcheblygin	28 December 2001	4 October 2016
Vasily Ikonnikov	4 October 2016	incumbent

==== Penza Oblast ====
Executive
Senator	Term start	Term end
Aleksandr Pleshakov	27 March 2001	7 June 2002
Aleksandr Bespalov	7 June 2002	3 March 2003
Boris Spiegel	3 April 2003	27 March 2013
Vladimir Yedalov	4 April 2013	21 September 2015
Vasily Bochkaryov	21 September 2015	22 June 2016
Alexey Dmitrienko	12 September 2016	21 September 2020
Maria Lvova-Belova	21 September 2020	10 November 2021
Nikolay Kondradyuk	21 December 2021	Incumbent

Legislative
Senator	Term start	Term end
Vladimir Pashkov	21 December 2001	28 May 2002
Andrey Vavilov	28 May 2002	17 March 2010
Yury Kalinin	31 March 2010	22 October 2012
Lyubov Glebova	22 October 2012	22 March 2015
Viktor Kondrashin	11 August 2015	September 2017
Oleg Melnichenko	26 September 2017	31 March 2021
Yulia Lazutkina	29 April 2021	incumbent

==== Pskov Oblast ====
Executive
Senator	Term start	Term end
Mikhail Margelov	21 December 2000	25 September 2014
Yelena Bibikova	25 September 2014	27 September 2023
Alexey Naumets	27 September 2023	incumbent

Legislative
Senator	Term start	Term end
Nikolai Medvedev	1 January 2002	6 July 2007
Andrey Turchak	6 July 2007	16 February 2009
Aleksandr Borisov	13 May 2009	27 October 2017
Andrey Turchak	2 November 2017	4 June 2024
Natalya Melnikova	15 October 2024	incumbent

==== Rostov Oblast ====
Executive
Senator	Term start	Term end
Sergey Anokhin	11 December 2001	21 September 2005
Yevgeny Bushmin	21 September 2005	6 October 2019
Vladimir Lakunin	14 November 2019	21 September 2020
Andrey Yatskin	21 September 2020	incumbent

Legislative
Senator	Term start	Term end
Alexander Kazakov	21 December 2001	26 December 2005
Sergey Kislov	22 March 2006	11 July 2007
Leonid Tyagachev	11 July 2007	15 September 2018
Irina Rukavishnikova	15 September 2018	20 November 2024
Vasily Golubev	22 November 2024	incumbent

==== Ryazan Oblast ====
Executive
Senator	Term start	Term end
Mikhail Odintsov	27 January 2001	30 April 2004
Andrey Ishchuk	30 April 2004	13 July 2005
Rafgat Altynbayev	21 September 2005	7 December 2012
Igor Morozov	7 December 2012	26 October 2017
Oleg Kovalyov	26 October 2017	11 May 2020
Irina Petina	17 June 2020	21 September 2022
Nikolay Lyubimov	21 September 2022	11 December 2024
Sergei Anopriyenko	14 February 2025	incumbent

Legislative
Senator	Term start	Term end
Igor Morozov	22 August 2001	7 December 2003
Yury Chaplin	18 February 2004	25 February 2005
Andrey Lavrov	8 June 2005	26 January 2011
Oleg Yeremeyev	26 January 2011	7 October 2015
Nikolai Bulayev	7 October 2015	28 March 2016
Larisa Tyurina	29 September 2016	10 October 2017
Igor Morozov	26 October 2017	15 November 2022
Igor Murog	2 April 2024	incumbent

==== Sakhalin Oblast ====
Executive
Senator	Term start	Term end
Valery Goreglyad	18 January 2001	12 May 2004
Vladimir Shapoval	3 June 2004	21 September 2005
Boris Agapov	12 October 2005	29 June 2012
Zhanna Ivanova	29 June 2012	31 December 2015
Dmitry Mezentsev	31 December 2015	30 April 2019
Grigory Karasin	12 September 2019	incumbent

Legislative
Senator	Term start	Term end
Boris Tretyak	13 December 2001	10 November 2010
Aleksandr Verkhovsky	10 November 2010	19 October 2017
Yuri Arkharov	19 October 2017	6 October 2022
Andrey Khapochkin	6 October 2022	incumbent

==== Samara Oblast ====
Executive
Senator	Term start	Term end
German Tkachenko	27 December 2001	13 July 2005
Andrey Ishchuk	13 July 2005	17 October 2007
Konstantin Titov	17 October 2007	9 October 2014
Dmitry Azarov	10 October 2014	25 September 2017
Farit Mukhametshin	17 September 2018	13 September 2024
Marina Sidukhina	13 September 2024	incumbent

Legislative
Senator	Term start	Term end
Leon Kovalsky	3 December 2001	25 January 2006
Aleksey Ushamirsky	28 June 2006	11 March 2007
Aleksandr Mileyev	30 May 2007	6 July 2007
Valery Parfyonov	6 July 2007	23 December 2011
Sergey Mamedov	23 December 2011	23 June 2021
Andrey Kislov	28 September 2021	8 October 2026
Vladimir Koshelev	8 October 2026	incumbent

==== Saratov Oblast ====
Executive
Senator	Term start	Term end
Ramazan Abdulatipov	19 December 2000	27 April 2005
Sergei Shuvalov	27 April 2005	28 April 2010
Vladimir Gusev	28 April 2010	24 April 2012
Lyudmila Bokova	24 April 2012	19 September 2017
Sergei Arenin	21 September 2017	16 September 2022
Andrey Denisov	16 September 2022	incumbent

Legislative
Senator	Term start	Term end
Valentin Zavadnikov	12 September 2001	24 October 2012
Mikhail Isayev	24 October 2012	28 September 2016
Oleg Alekseyev	28 September 2016	19 September 2017
Lyudmila Bokova	19 September 2017	27 January 2020
Oleg Alekseyev	8 April 2020	21 September 2022
Valery Radayev	21 September 2022	incumbent

==== Smolensk Oblast ====
Executive
Senator	Term start	Term end
Vladimir Nikitov	18 December 2001	4 July 2002
Magomed Magomedov	4 July 2002	22 April 2009
Nikolai Frolov	22 April 2009	23 November 2012
Anatoly Mishnev	23 November 2012	29 September 2015
Frants Klintsevich	29 September 2015	18 September 2020
Nina Kulikovskikh	18 September 2020	20 September 2023
Ruslan Smashnyov	20 September 2023	10 December 2025
Yury Vorobyov	17 December 2025	incumbent

Legislative
Senator	Term start	Term end
Vladimir Beryozov	18 January 2002	18 June 2002
Sergey Antufyev	18 June 2002	7 December 2003
Pavel Berks	26 December 2003	30 January 2008
Viktor Maslov	30 January 2008	26 September 2013
Lyudmila Kozlova	26 September 2013	27 September 2018
Sergey Leonov	27 September 2018	6 October 2021
Irina Kozhanova	21 October 2021	28 September 2023
Artyom Malashchenkov	28 September 2023	incumbent

==== Sverdlovsk Oblast ====
Executive
Senator	Term start	Term end
Valery Trushnikov	1 January 2002	18 June 2008
Aleksandr Shkolnik	15 October 2008	16 December 2009
Eduard Rossel	16 December 2009	20 September 2022
Viktor Sheptiy	20 September 2022	incumbent

Legislative
Senator	Term start	Term end
Andrey Shmelyov	27 November 2001	19 September 2007
Yury Osintsev	19 September 2007	2 April 2009
Arkady Chernetsky	27 October 2010	8 October 2021
Alexander Vysokinsky	8 October 2021	10 November 2026
Aleksey Orlov	10 November 2026	incumbent

==== Tambov Oblast ====
Executive
Senator	Term start	Term end
Vasily Klyuchenok	11 December 2001	9 July 2007
Yevgeny Tarlo	July 2007	July 2015
Aleksey Kondratyev	22 September 2015	22 September 2020
Alexander Babakov	22 September 2020	6 October 2021
Mikhail Belousov	13 December 2021	23 September 2025
Aleksey Kondratyev	23 September 2025	incumbent

Legislative
Senator	Term start	Term end
Nikolai Kosarev	29 December 2001	28 September 2016
Alexander Babakov	28 September 2016	22 September 2020
Svetlana Korostelyova	14 October 2020	27 September 2021
Aleksandr Nikitin	7 October 2021	28 September 2026
Aleksey Puchnin	28 September 2026	incumbent

==== Tomsk Oblast ====
Executive
Senator	Term start	Term end
Yury Gurdin	28 December 2001	25 September 2002
Vladimir Zhidkikh	25 September 2002	26 September 2003
Aleksandr Suvorov	25 March 2005	17 May 2012
Viktor Kress	17 May 2012	incumbent

Legislative
Senator	Term start	Term end
Yury Kovalyov	28 December 2001	17 March 2007
Vladimir Zhidkikh	19 September 2007	1 September 2012
Igor Chernyshyov	27 September 2012	28 September 2016
Vladimir Kravchenko	7 October 2016	incumbent

==== Tula Oblast ====
Executive
Senator	Term start	Term end
Anatoly Vaskov	25 December 2001	15 April 2004
Aleksandr Lunyov	15 April 2004	13 July 2005
Anatoly Vaskov	13 July 2005	30 September 2011
Artur Chilingarov	14 November 2011	1 October 2014
Yuliya Veprintseva	7 October 2014	September 2016
Dmitry Savelyev	6 October 2016	13 September 2024
Nikolai Vorobyov	13 September 2024	incumbent

Legislative
Senator	Term start	Term end
Oleg Tatarinov	21 December 2000	3 October 2004
Viktor Sokolovsky	5 November 2004	16 December 2009
Egor Atanov	16 December 2009	September 2014
Igor Panchenko	30 September 2014	26 July 2023
Marina Levina	28 September 2023	16 September 2024
Mikhail Borshchev	7 October 2024	incumbent

==== Tver Oblast ====
Executive
Senator	Term start	Term end
Anatoly Dubodel	31 May 2001	29 January 2004
Viktor Abramov	29 January 2004	2 December 2007
Vladimir Savin	30 January 2008	20 December 2011
Viktor Abramov	20 December 2011	26 September 2016
Vladimir Lukin	26 September 2016	24 September 2021
Lyudmila Skakovskaya	24 September 2021	24 September 2026
Aleksey Meshkov	24 September 2026	incumbent

Legislative
Senator	Term start	Term end
Vladimir Petrov	25 December 2001	September 2016
Andrei Yepishin	3 October 2016	incumbent

==== Tyumen Oblast ====
Executive
Senator	Term start	Term end
Aleksandr Gavrin	27 February 2001	23 March 2005
Stepan Kirichuk	23 March 2005	17 September 2018
Pavel Tarakanov	27 September 2018	25 September 2024
Vladimir Yakushev	25 September 2024	incumbent

Legislative
Senator	Term start	Term end
Andrey Artyukhov	14 February 2002	23 November 2005
Aleksandr Lotorev	7 December 2005	4 December 2011
Mikhail Ponomaryov	4 December 2011	13 March 2021
Dmitry Goritsky	27 May 2021	incumbent

==== Ulyanovsk Oblast ====
Executive
Senator	Term start	Term end
Aleksandr Kalita	18 January 2001	22 June 2005
Rustem Shiyanov	22 June 2005	14 April 2011
Gennady Savinov	14 April 2011	6 October 2016
Vadim Kharlov	6 October 2016	5 October 2021
Ayrat Gibatdinov	5 October 2021	incumbent

Legislative
Senator	Term start	Term end
Valery Sychyov	29 October 2001	31 August 2008
Sergey Bazhanov	26 November 2008	14 August 2013
Sergey Ryabukhin	20 September 2013	incumbent

==== Vladimir Oblast ====
Executive
Senator	Term start	Term end
Vadim Gustov	28 February 2001	13 December 2011
Aleksandr Sinyagin	13 December 2011	24 September 2013
Anton Belyakov	24 September 2013	8 October 2018
Aleksandr Pronyushkin	8 October 2018	17 September 2022
Andrey Shokhin	17 September 2022	incumbent

Legislative
Senator	Term start	Term end
Yevgeny Ilyushkin	24 January 2001	25 March 2009
Aleksandr Savenkov	25 March 2009	25 September 2013
Sergey Rybakov	25 September 2013	September 2018
Olga Khokhlova	5 October 2018	22 September 2023
Vladimir Kiselyov	22 September 2023	incumbent

==== Volgograd Oblast ====
Executive
Senator	Term start	Term end
Sergey Agaptsov	25 January 2001	9 June 2004
Dmitry Skarga	28 October 2004	25 September 2006
Vladimir Babichev	27 December 2006	3 February 2010
Nikolay Maksyuta	3 February 2010	25 September 2014
Yelena Popova	25 September 2014	25 September 2019
Nikolai Semisotov	25 September 2019	incumbent

Legislative
Senator	Term start	Term end
Aleksandr Golovanchikov	14 June 2001	19 February 2004
Vadim Artyukhov	19 February 2004	25 March 2009
Vladimir Plotnikov	25 March 2009	25 September 2014
Tatyana Lebedeva	2 October 2014	9 October 2019
Sergei Gornyakov	9 October 2019	incumbent

==== Vologda Oblast ====
Executive
Senator	Term start	Term end
Valery Fyodorov	3 October 2001	10 February 2012
Nikolai Tikhomirov	10 February 2012	19 September 2019
Yelena Avdeyeva	19 September 2019	29 August 2023
Olga Danilova	26 September 2023	8 November 2023
Oleg Kuvshinnikov	9 November 2023	27 September 2024
Yevgeny Bogomazov	27 September 2024	24 September 2026
Sergey Sorokin	21 October 2026	incumbent

Legislative
Senator	Term start	Term end
Gennady Khripel	20 December 2001	4 May 2007
Yury Vorobyov	4 May 2007	17 December 2025
Roman Maslov	26 February 2026	incumbent

==== Voronezh Oblast ====
Executive
Senator	Term start	Term end
Boris Preobrazhensky	15 February 2001	1 June 2004
Konstantin Yeryomenko	1 June 2004	13 May 2009
Vladimir Kulakov	13 May 2009	3 November 2011
Gennady Makin	3 November 2011	22 September 2014
Galina Karelova	22 September 2014	incumbent

Legislative
Senator	Term start	Term end
Gleb Fetisov	12 July 2001	13 May 2009
Konstantin Yeryomenko	27 May 2009	18 March 2010
Nikolay Olshansky	20 January 2011	1 March 2013
Sergey Lukin	12 April 2013	3 October 2025
Vladimir Netyosov	3 October 2025	incumbent

==== Yaroslavl Oblast ====
Executive
Senator	Term start	Term end
Viktor Glukhikh	31 October 2001	3 June 2011
Yury Udalov	6 June 2011	18 December 2012
Viktor Rogotsky	18 December 2012	20 September 2017
Igor Kagramanyan	20 September 2017	17 June 2020
Sergey Beryozkin	18 June 2020	20 September 2022
Aleksandr Rusakov	20 September 2022	incumbent

Legislative
Senator	Term start	Term end
Yevgeny Zayashnikov	12 November 2001	7 December 2003
Nikolai Tonkov	9 April 2004	22 November 2011
Anatoly Lisitsyn	22 November 2011	25 September 2018
Natalia Kosikhina	25 September 2018	incumbent

==== Zaporozhye Oblast ====
Executive
Senator	Term start	Term end
Dmitry Vorona	20 December 2022	20 September 2023
Dmitry Rogozin	23 September 2023	incumbent

Legislative
Senator	Term start	Term end
Dmitry Vorona	20 September 2023	20 September 2026

=== Autonomous Okrugs ===
==== Chukotka ====
Executive
Senator	Term start	Term end
Aleksandr Nazarov	18 January 2001	15 October 2003
Larisa Ponomaryova	23 March 2005	September 2013
Anna Otke	25 September 2013	incumbent

Legislative
Senator	Term start	Term end
Efim Malkin	1 January 2002	1 June 2015
Aramas Dallakyan	5 June 2015	1 October 2021
Anastasia Zhukova	1 October 2021	2 October 2026
Sergey Karginov	2 October 2026	incumbent

==== Khanty-Mansi Autonomous Okrug ====
Executive
Senator	Term start	Term end
Gennady Oleynik	1 June 2001	26 May 2010
Nikolai Fedoryak	26 May 2010	14 September 2015
Eduard Isakov	14 September 2015	2 August 2024
Natalya Komarova	9 September 2024	incumbent

Legislative
Senator	Term start	Term end
Pyotr Volostrigov	1 June 2001	7 July 2006
Viktor Pichugov	7 July 2006	29 October 2015
Vasily Sondykov	29 October 2015	6 October 2016
Yury Vazhenin	6 October 2016	7 October 2021
Alexander Noviukhov	7 October 2021	incumbent

==== Nenets Autonomous Okrug ====
Executive
Senator	Term start	Term end
Yury Volkov	31 January 2002	26 September 2002
Aleksandr Sabadash	25 June 2003	27 June 2006
Yury Biryukov	22 December 2006	20 September 2014
Vadim Tyulpanov	20 September 2014	4 April 2017
Valentina Zganich	20 April 2017	1 October 2018
Olga Starostina	1 October 2018	13 September 2020
Denis Gusev	14 September 2020	incumbent

Legislative
Senator	Term start	Term end
Tatyana Konovalova	23 May 2001	12 July 2005
Aleksandr Sabadash	24 March 2005	26 May 2005
Igor Koshin	14 December 2006	6 June 2007
Farkhad Akhmedov	6 June 2007	18 July 2009
Aleksey Panteleyev	18 July 2009	9 February 2012
Igor Koshin	9 February 2012	26 February 2014
Sergey Kotkin	17 March 2014	22 September 2014
Yevgeny Alekseyev	7 November 2014	2 October 2018
Rimma Galushina	2 October 2018	7 November 2023
Aleksandr Lutovinov	7 November 2023	incumbent

==== Yamalo-Nenets Autonomous Okrug ====
Executive
Senator	Term start	Term end
Alexander Yevstifeyev	11 January 2002	28 January 2004
Vladimir Spitsnadel	28 January 2004	31 March 2010
Yury Neyolov	31 March 2010	10 September 2018
Yelena Zlenko	10 September 2018	12 September 2023
Vladimir Pushkaryov	12 September 2023	incumbent

Legislative
Senator	Term start	Term end
Yefim Kerpelman	13 December 2000	2 June 2004
Boris Gutin	2 June 2004	26 May 2006
Dmitry Ananyev	25 September 2006	18 August 2013
Aleksandr Yermakov	25 September 2013	24 September 2020
Grigory Ledkov	25 September 2020	25 September 2025
Alexey Sitnikov	25 September 2025	incumbent

=== Autonomous Oblasts ===
==== Jewish Autonomous Oblast ====
Executive
Senator	Term start	Term end
Igor Glukhovsky	29 November 2000	3 March 2010
Nikolay Volkov	3 March 2010	22 September 2015
Rostislav Goldstein	22 September 2015	23 December 2019
Yuri Valyaev	22 September 2020	23 September 2025
Natalya Khorova	23 September 2025	incumbent

Legislative
Senator	Term start	Term end
Stanislav Vavilov	28 February 2001	27 March 2007
Boris Listov	27 March 2007	30 October 2009
Vladimir Dzhabarov	25 December 2009	30 September 2025
Roman Boyko	9 December 2025	8 October 2026
Svetlana Lukash	8 October 2026	incumbent

=== Federal Cities ===
==== Moscow ====
Executive
Senator	Term start	Term end
Boris Nikolsky	15 January 2002	14 January 2010
Oleg Tolkachyov	14 January 2010	22 December 2010
Yury Roslyak	22 December 2010	13 September 2013
Vladimir Dolgikh	13 September 2013	19 September 2018
Vladimir Kozhin	19 September 2018	incumbent

Legislative
Senator	Term start	Term end
Vladimir Plotnikov	6 October 2001	26 October 2005
Zinaida Dragunkina	26 October 2005	19 September 2019
Inna Svyatenko	19 September 2019	incumbent

==== Saint Petersburg ====
Executive
Senator	Term start	Term end
Mikhail Mikhailovsky	1 January 2002	29 October 2003
Vitaly Mutko	29 October 2003	12 May 2008
Sergey Tarasov	30 May 2008	30 October 2009
Viktor Yevtukhov	25 November 2009	28 February 2011
Vladimir Barkanov	9 March 2011	10 September 2011
Valentina Matviyenko	31 August 2011	incumbent

Legislative
Senator	Term start	Term end
Sergey Mironov	13 June 2001	18 May 2011
Vadim Tyulpanov	14 December 2011	20 September 2014
Lyudmila Kostkina	20 September 2014	September 2016
Andrey Kutepov	28 September 2016	incumbent

==== Sevastopol ====
Executive
Senator	Term start	Term end
Andrey Sobolyev	10 October 2014	19 September 2017
Valery Kulikov	19 September 2017	2 October 2020
Yekaterina Altabayeva	2 October 2020	incumbent

Legislative
Senator	Term start	Term end
Olga Timofeyeva	21 October 2014	14 September 2019
Yekaterina Altabayeva	14 September 2019	2 October 2020
Sergey Kolbin	29 October 2020	13 September 2024
Larisa Melnik	13 September 2024	incumbent

=== Disestablished regions ===
==== Chita Oblast ====
Executive
Vladimir Melnikov	24 January 2001	15 December 2010

Legislative
Vitaly Vishnyakov	20 December 2000	16 December 2004
Grigory Tomchin	16 December 2004	27 April 2005
Konstantin Surkov	27 April 2005	15 December 2010

==== Kamchatka Oblast ====
Executive
Valery Bykov	25 January 2001	20 February 2008

Legislative
Lev Boytsov	21 December 2001	20 February 2008

==== Perm Oblast ====
Executive
Oleg Chirkunov	18 January 2001	18 March 2004
Tatyana Popova	22 April 2004	2 March 2007

Legislative
Viktor Dobrosotsky	4 October 2001	2 March 2007

==== Agin-Buryat Autonomous Okrug ====
Executive
Senator	Term start	Term end
Vladimir Shoyzhilzhapov	7 February 2001	4 March 2004
Khamzat Gutseriev	4 March 2004	23 June 2006
Sergey Bekov	14 July 2006	15 December 2010

Legislative
Senator	Term start	Term end
Bato-Zhargal Zhambalnimbuyev	28 February 2001	15 December 2010

==== Evenk Autonomous Okrug ====
Executive
Yury Sharandin	27 June 2001	16 April 2008

Legislative
Nikolay Anisimov	18 April 2001	4 June 2004
Vasily Shakhnovsky	27 October 2003	24 November 2003
Mikhail Odintsov	4 June 2004	15 November 2006

==== Komi-Permyak Autonomous Okrug ====
Executive
Oganes Oganyan	26 January 2001	2 March 2007

Legislative
Vladimir Solomonov	21 December 2001	2 March 2007
Leonid Sukhoterin	3 May 2001	21 December 2001

==== Koryak Autonomous Okrug ====
Executive
Viktor Orlov	24 January 2001	20 February 2008

Legislative
Aleksandr Suvorov	18 October 2001	20 February 2008

==== Taymyr Autonomous Okrug ====
Executive
Leonid Bindar	30 March 2001	16 April 2008

Legislative
Leonid Roketsky	8 June 2001	19 September 2007

==== Ust-Orda Buryat Autonomous Okrug ====
Executive
Sergey Popov	25 December 2000	7 December 2003
Mikhail Yukov	29 January 2004	23 March 2005
Sergei Gordeev	23 March 2005	19 July 2007

Legislative
Leonid Khutanov	2 April 2001	9 April 2004
Valeri Gladilin	9 April 2004	1 January 2008
