= Aleksey Puchnin =

Russian politician

- Алексей Пучнин

Russian Federation Senator from Tambov Oblast
- Incumbent
- Assumed office 28 September 2026
- Preceded by: Aleksandr Nikitin

Personal details
- Born: 7 March 1973 (age 53) Tambov, Soviet Union
- Party: Independent
- Education: Tambov State University; Tambov State Technical University

Aleksey Sergeyevich Puchnin (Russian: Алексей Сергеевич Пучнин; born March 7, 1973, in Tambov, Tambov Oblast, RSFSR, USSR) is a Russian politician, a senator of the Federation Council representing the Tambov Oblast Duma since September 28, 2026 and a member of the Committee on Federal Structure, Regional Policy, Local Self-Government, and Northern Affairs.

He served as Chairman of the St. Petersburg Election Commission (2012–2017) and the Tambov Oblast Election Commission (2006–2012). He holds the academic degree of Candidate of Legal Sciences.

== Awards ==
- Order of Friendship (July 13, 2026) — for professional achievements and many years of conscientious work
- Medal of the Order "For Merit to the Fatherland", 1st class (2022)
- Medal of the Order "For Merit to the Fatherland", 2nd class (2012)
- Certificate of Honor from the Central Election Commission of the Russian Federation (2008)
- Certificate of Honor from the Tambov Oblast(2011)
- Tambov Oblast G. V. Chicherin and B. N. Chicherin Prize (2011)
- Tambov Oblast Badge "For Labor Achievements" (2009)
