= Sergey Ivanov (Saint Petersburg politician) =

Russian politician

- Сергей Иванов
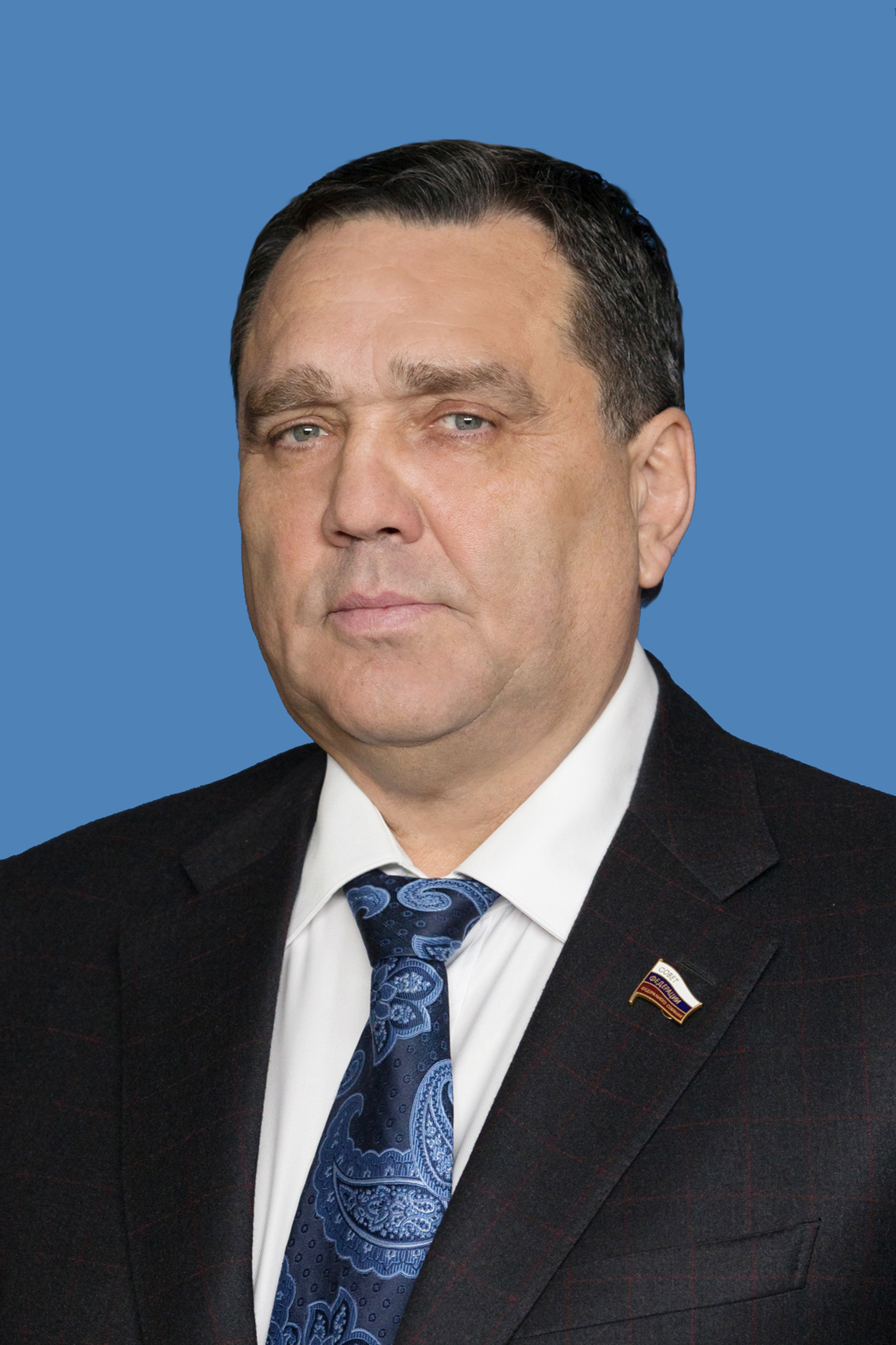
- Member of the Federation Council, Senator Ivanov S.P.

Russian Federation Senator from Magadan Oblast
- Incumbent
- Assumed office 2 June 2006
- Preceded by: Vyacheslav Kalikyan

Russian Federation Senator from Kirov Oblast
- In office 14 April 2004 – 2 June 2006
- Preceded by: Mikhail Mikheyev
- Succeeded by: Andrey Khazin
- In office 13 November 2002 – 25 March 2004
- Preceded by: Vladimir Sysovlyatin
- Succeeded by: Aleksey Klishin

Personal details
- Born: Sergey Pavlovich Ivanov; 19 April 1952 (age 73) Leningrad, Soviet Union
- Party: United Russia

Sergey Pavlovich Ivanov (Russian: Сергей Павлович Иванов; born on 19 April 1952), is a Russian politician, who is currently a member of the Federation Council since 2002, currently a Senator of the legislative authority of Magadan Oblast since 2006.

== Biography ==
Sergey Ivanov was born in Leningrad on 19 April 1952.

He began his career as a car mechanic at the Mineralovodsk forwarding office in the Stavropol Krai. From 1972 to 1974, he worked as a salesman in Essentuk. From 1975 to 1979, he was in charge of a store in the Stavropol Territorial Consumer Union in the village of Essentukskaya. From 1979 to 1988, he held the positions of a senior foreman and head of the production department of the Essentuki city administration department, in 1988 he was appointed deputy chairman of the Essentuki kurorpromtorg.

In 1988, he graduated from the Stavropol Polytechnic Institute with the qualification of an engineer-economist.

In 1990, he was appointed head of the workshop, and then - deputy general director of the Pyatigorsk factory for the repair and manufacture of knitwear. From 1993 to 2001, he was the general director of Zhivaya Voda LLC. In 2001, he became an assistant to a member of the Federation Council, and worked in the representative office of the Kirov Oblast in Moscow.

In November 2002, the representative of the executive power of the Kirov Oblast in the Federation Council, Vladimir Sysolyatin, appointed him as the deputy chairman of the government of the Kirov region, in charge of forestry, the regional forest industry, as well as nature management and environmental protection, and by the Resolution of the Federation Council No. 437-SF. On 13 November 2002, the powers of Sergei Pavlovich Ivanov were confirmed as a representative of the executive body of state power in the Kirov Oblast. On 25 March 2004, Aleksey Klishin became the new representative of the government of the Kirov region in the Federation Council, and Ivanov from April 2004 to June 2006 represented the Legislative Assembly of the Kirov region in the Federation Council.

In 2004, he graduated from the Pyatigorsk branch of the North Caucasus Academy of Public Administration with a degree in manager, and in 2005, he received a higher legal education at the Saint Petersburg University of the Ministry of Internal Affairs of Russia. He is a candidate of Legal Sciences, and a candidate of Economic Sciences.

On 30 May 2006, the Magadan Oblast Duma elected Ivanov the representative of the regional legislature in the Federation Council in connection with the death of his predecessor, Vyacheslav Kalikyan, in a car accident in the Krasnodar Krai.

On 28 September 2015, the Magadan Oblast Duma of the VI convocation, again extended the powers of Ivanov in the Federation Council.
