= Nikolai Yezhov (senator) =

- Николай Ежов
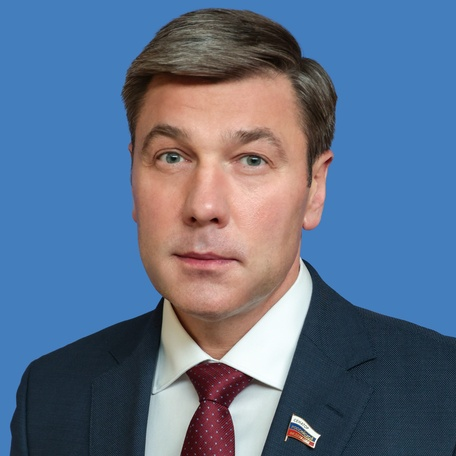

Senator from Magadan Oblast
- Incumbent
- Assumed office 9 October 2025
- Preceded by: Anatoly Shirokov

Personal details
- Born: 1 January 1978 (age 48) RSFSR, Soviet Union
- Party: United Russia
- Education: Military University of the Ministry of Defense
- Awards: Order of Courage; Medal "For the Development of Siberia and the Far East"

Nikolai Sergeevich Yezhov (Russian: Николай Сергеевич Ежов; born January 1, 1978) is a Senator of the Federation Council (since October 9, 2025) representing the executive branch of the Magadan Oblast. He is a member of the Committee on Rules and Organization of Parliamentary Activities. He is a member of United Russia party.

== Biography ==
He was born in 1978. He graduated from the Higher Naval School of Submarine Navigation (engineer) in 2000 and from the Military University of the Ministry of Defense of the Russian Federation (management specialist) in 2006.

Since February 2020, he has served as Acting Chief Federal Inspector for the Magadan Oblast.

Since April 2020, he has served as Chief Federal Inspector for the Magadan Oblast in the Office of the Plenipotentiary Representative of the president of the Russian Federation in the Far Eastern Federal District.

He was a member of the Commission for Combating Illegal Trafficking of Industrial Products in the Magadan Oblast.

=== Federation Council ===
Since 2025 he is a member of the Federation Council (Senator) – Representative of the executive body of state power of the Magadan Oblast since October 9, 2025.
