= Larisa Melnik =

- Лариса Мельник
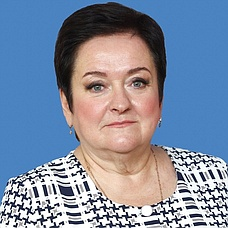

Senator from Sevastopol
- Incumbent
- Assumed office 19 September 2024
- Preceded by: Sergey Kolbin

Personal details
- Born: 13 December 1962 (age 63) Kryvyi Rih, Ukrainian SSR, Soviet Union
- Party: United Russia
- Education: Kyiv University; Odesa University

Larisa Vadimovna Melnik (Russian: Лариса Вадимовна Мельник; born December 13, 1962, in Kryvyi Rih, Dnipropetrovsk Oblast) is a Russian politician. She has served as a senator of the Federation Council representing the Legislative Assembly of Sevastopol (city legislative branch) since September 19, 2024. She is a member of the Committee on Rules and Organization of Parliamentary Activities.

== Biography ==
She was born December 13, 1962, in Kryvyi Rih, Dnipropetrovsk Oblast, Ukrainian SSR.

In 1988, she graduated from Taras Shevchenko National University of Kyiv with a degree in political science. In 1994, she graduated from Odesa State University with a degree in law.

In 1988, she moved to Sevastopol.

She was involved in social and political activities. She led the public organization "MOSKIT" ("Youth Defends Sevastopol Culture, History, and Traditions"), founded in 2008.

In 2014, she participated in organizing and conducting mass protest rallies in Sevastopol under anti-government and pro-Russian slogans. She was a member of the initiative group that organized the People's Will Rally on February 23, 2014, which protested against the new Ukrainian leadership and advocated for the reunification of Crimea and Sevastopol with Russia.

She headed the information and consulting post of the Sevastopol Coordination Council and was a member of the organizing committee for the preparation and conduct of the referendum on the status of Crimea and Sevastopol on March 16, 2014.

From 2014 to 2017, she served as deputy head, and from 2017 to 2024, head of the Sevastopol regional executive committee of the All-Russia People's Front.

From September 2014 to December 2023, she served as a member of the Leninsky Municipal District Council of the 1st-3rd convocations from United Russia. She was elected on September 14, 2014 (42.55% of the vote), September 18, 2016 (27.95%), and September 13, 2020 (38.72%). She served as head of the local administration of the Leninsky Municipal District, an intracity municipal entity of the city of Sevastopol.

From 2015 to 2018, she was deputy chair of the association "Council of Municipalities of the City of Sevastopol".

In 2017, she was a member of the all-Russian initiative group to nominate Vladimir Putin for the Russian presidential election, and in 2018, she was a member of the Sevastopol city election headquarters of presidential candidate Vladimir Putin.

In March 2020, she became one of the initiators of the "We Are Together - Sevastopol" volunteer movement.

In December 2023, she joined the initiative group to nominate Vladimir Putin as a candidate for the 2024 Russian presidential election. In 2024, she served as co-chair of the Sevastopol city election headquarters and a trusted representative of presidential candidate Vladimir Putin.

On September 8, 2024, she was elected to the Legislative Assembly of Sevastopol of the third convocation. She ran as a United Russia candidate and led the party's list of candidates in the election. She resigned her seat as a member of parliament due to her transfer to the Federation Council of the Russian Federation.

Since September 2024, she has been a Russian senator and a representative of the Legislative Assembly of Sevastopol in the Federation Council of Russia. She was appointed to her current position on September 19, 2024. She replaced Sergei Kolbin in the Federation Council.

She is a member of United Russia party since 2014 and a member of the political council of the Sevastopol regional branch of the party since 2023.
