= Alexander Trembitsky =

Russian politician (born 1987)

- Александр Трембицкий
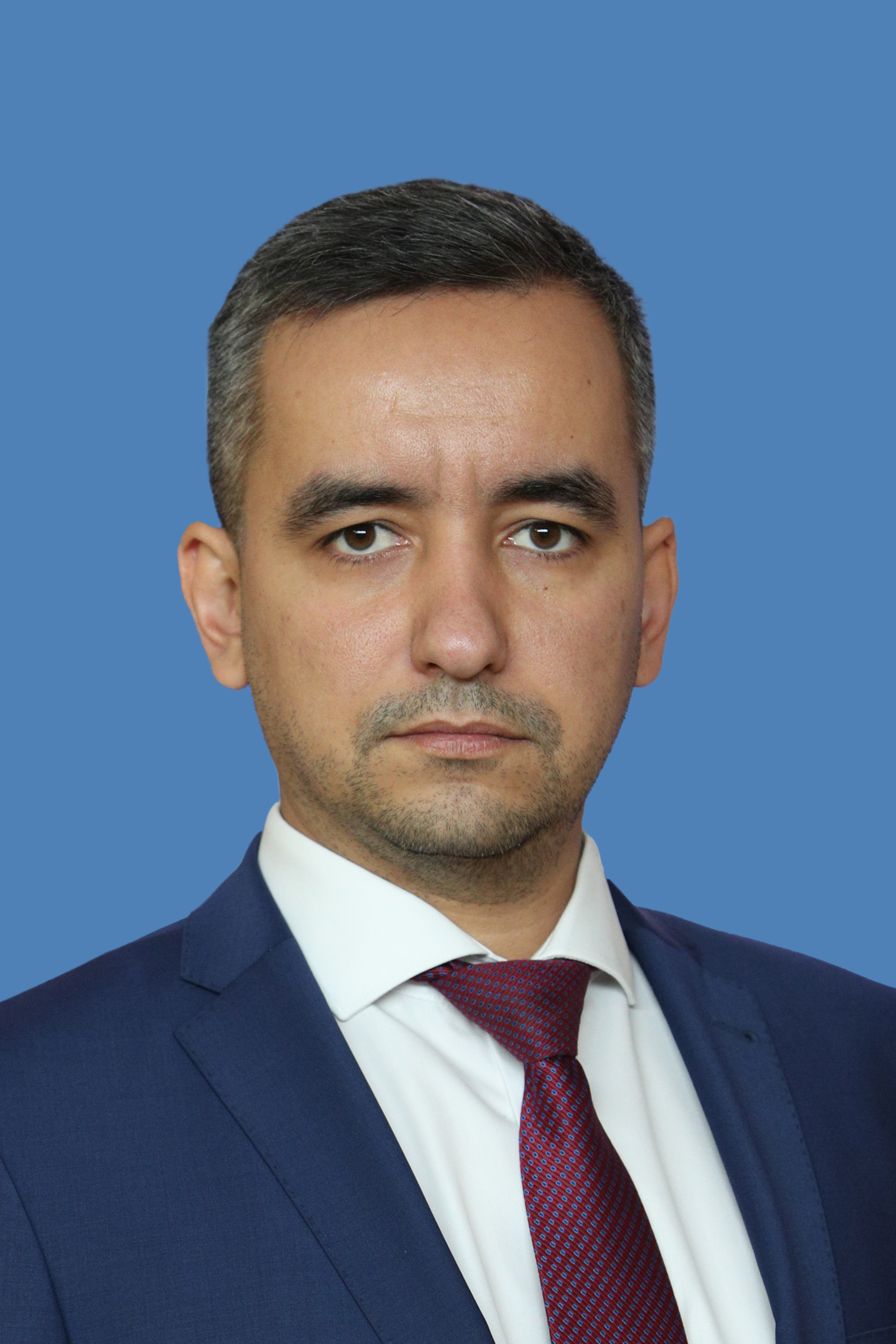
- Trembitsky in 2022

Senator from Krasnodar Krai
- Incumbent
- Assumed office 27 October 2022
- Preceded by: Vladimir Beketov

Personal details
- Born: Alexander Trembitsky; 28 October 1987 (age 38) Platnirovskaya, Krasnodar Krai, Russian SFSR, Soviet Union
- Party: United Russia
- Education: Kuban State Agrarian University

Alexander Alexanderovich Trembitsky (Russian: Александр Александрович Трембицкий; born 28 October 1987) is a Russian politician serving as a senator from Krasnodar Krai since 27 October 2022.

== Early life ==
Alexander Trembitsky was born on 28 October 1987 in Platnirovskaya, Krasnodar Krai. His father, also named Alexander Trembitsky, since 2021 has served as the head of the Rostekhnadzor. In 2010, Alexander Trembitsky graduated from the Kuban State Agrarian University.

== Political career ==
After graduation, Trembitsky served as deputy head of the Korenovsky District. From 2014 to 2016, he was the head of the Woodworking Industry Department of the Ministry of Industry and Energy of the Krasnodar Krai. In 2017, he was appointed the deputy head of Gelendzhik. From April 2019 to June 2020, he was Deputy Minister of Krasnodar Krai. From September 2020 to September 2022, Trembitsky was the Vice Governor of the Krasnodar Krai, specializing in the questions of transport, fuel and energy complex and housing, and communal services. Since 27 October 2022, he has served as a senator from Krasnodar Krai.
