= Aleksandr Totoonov =

Russian economist (born 1957)

- Александр Тотоонов
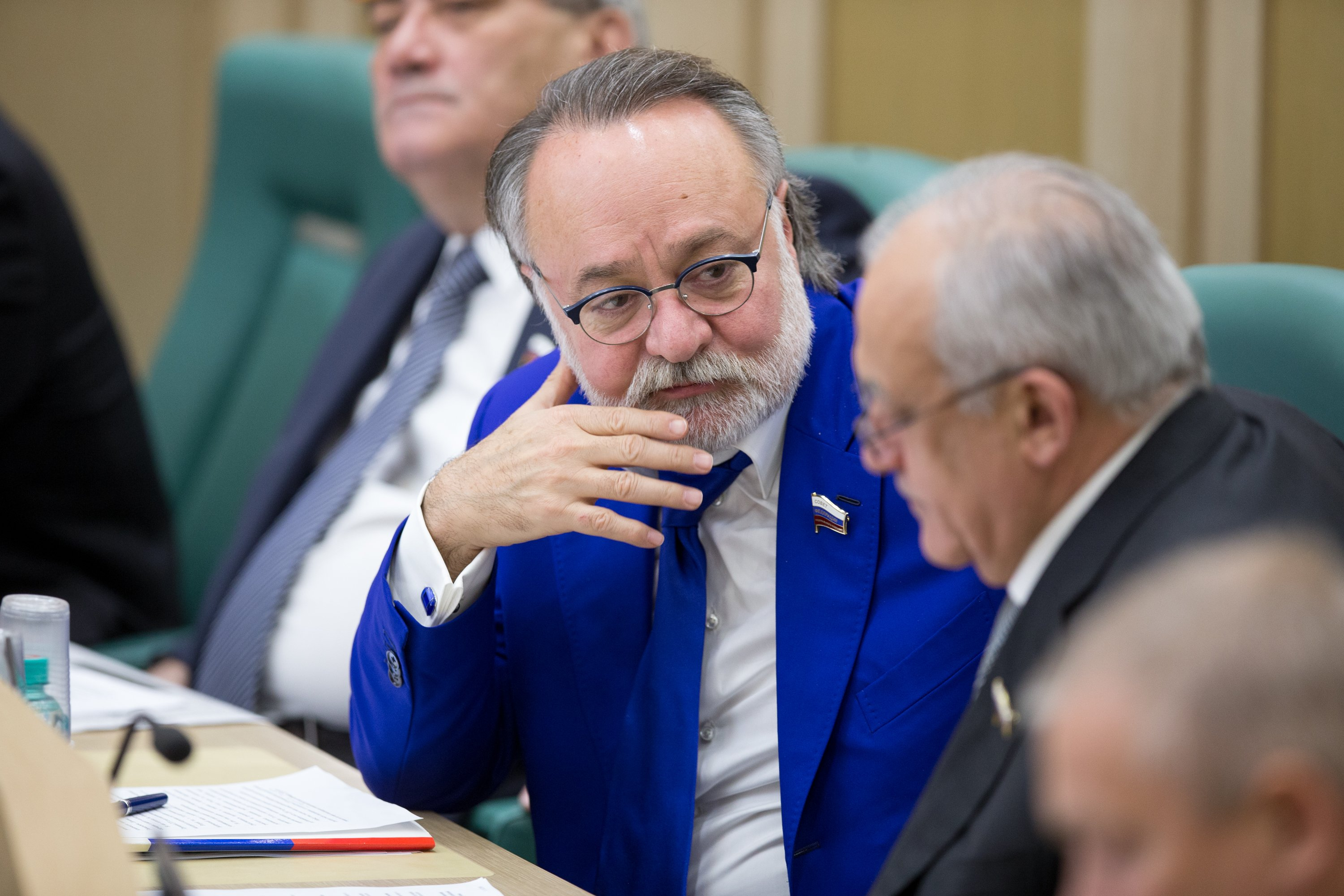

Russian Federation Senator from the Republic of North Ossetia–Alania
- In office 28 November 2012 – 22 September 2017
- Preceded by: Valery Kadokhov
- Succeeded by: Arsen Fadzayev

Personal details
- Born: Aleksander Borisovich Totoonov; 3 April 1957 (age 68) Ordzhonikidze, North Ossetian ASSR, RSFSR, Soviet Union

Aleksander Borisovich Totoonov (Russian: Александр Борисович Тотоонов; born on 3 April 1957), is a Russian politician who had served as the member of the Federation Council - a representative from the legislative authority of the Republic of North Ossetia–Alania.

== Biography ==
Aleksandr Totoonov was born on 3 April 1957, in the city of Ordzhonikidze (present-day Vladikavkaz) of the North Ossetian Autonomous Soviet Socialist Republic in the Soviet Union. He graduated from the philological faculty of the North Ossetian State University and postgraduate studies at Moscow State University. He is a candidate in Economic Sciences, for dissertation research on the topic "Organizational and economic mechanism for the implementation of privatization in the Russian Federation").

After graduation, he worked in the Komsomol, party and Soviet bodies of the republic - he headed the city Komsomol organization of the city of Ordzhonikidze, was the executive secretary-deputy editor of the newspaper "Young Communist", headed the culture department of the Ordzhonikidze City Council, was repeatedly elected a deputy of the district and city councils of the Vladikavkaz people's deputies.

Since 1991, he worked in private business.

In 2005, Totoonov was appointed Deputy Chairman of the Government of the Republic of North Ossetia - Alania, and was the Plenipotentiary Representative of the Republic. During his work as the Plenipotentiary Representative, Totoonov organized numerous working trips and visits of members of the Russian Government to the republic in order to familiarize them in detail with the economic potential of North Ossetia, to solve specific problems associated with its socio-economic development.

Largely thanks Totoonov's efforts, in 2007, an agreement of friendship and cooperation was concluded between North Ossetia and the Chinese province of Sichuan.

In 2010, on Totoonov's initiative, the Council of Heads of Representative Offices of the North Caucasus Federal District began its activities. With his direct participation, the implementation of the largest projects in the North Caucasus has begun - the construction of the Caucasian Musical and Cultural Center of V.A.Gergiev, a cascade of small power plants on the river Urukh in the Digor gorge, the Mamison ski complex.

In October 2012, Totoonov has been a deputy of the Meeting of Representatives of the city of Vladikavkaz from the United Russia party.

On 28 November 2012, Totoonov was elected as member of the Federation Council - a representative from the legislative authority of the Republic of North Ossetia-Alania.

=== Sanctions ===
He was sanctioned by the UK government in 2022 in relation to the Russo-Ukrainian War.

== Labor activity ==
Totoonov is known as the initiator, organizer and active participant of many large socially significant and charitable projects.

Totoonov was the Head of the Board of Trustees of the International Piano Competition Chopin, was a member of the directorate of the International Youth Piano Competition. S. V. Rachmaninov, was a member of the organizing committee of the Moscow Easter Festival, organizationally and financially contributing to these large-scale events.

For many years, Totoonov has been supporting orphanages in North and South Ossetia, as well as children who suffered as a result of the terrorist act in the city of Beslan, and the residents of South Ossetia who suffered from the Russo-Georgian War 2008. At the initiative and direct assistance of Totoonov, the requiem concerts “Beslan ... One Year Later” (Moscow, 5 September 2005) and “Beslan ... Two Years Later” (Vladikavkaz, 3 September 2006) were organized. In September 2006, in Strasbourg (France) at the Palace of Music, an action dedicated to the memory of the victims of Beslan was held and was designed to draw the attention of the general public and EU politicians to the topic of joining efforts in countering terrorism. The initiator and organizer of the event was Totoonov.

In 2008, with his direct participation, an action was held in Japan dedicated to the anniversary of the bombing of Hiroshima and designed to unite all who stand in solidarity with the victims of the Hiroshima and Beslan tragedies. Partnership and friendly relations developed between Beslan and Hiroshima.
