= Oleg Zemtsov =

- Олег Земцов
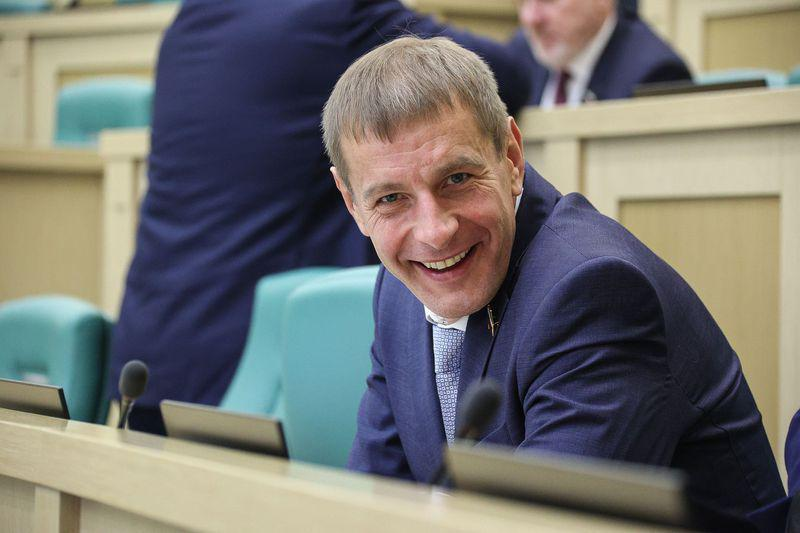

Senator from Khakassia
- In office 19 September 2023 – Incumbent
- Preceded by: Valery Usatyuk

Personal details
- Born: 1 November 1976 (age 49) Znamenka, RSFSR, Soviet Union
- Party: Independent
- Education: Khakassian State University

Oleg Aleksandrovich Zemtsov (Russian: Олег Александрович Земцов; born November 1, 1976, in Znamenka, Krasnoyarsk Krai) is a Russian politician. He is a Senator of the Russian Federation representing the executive branch of the Republic of Khakassia. He is also a member of the Federation Council Committee on Constitutional Legislation and State-Building (since September 24, 2025).

== Biography ==
Oleg Aleksandrovich Zemtsov was born on November 1, 1976, in the village of Znamenka, Minusinsky District, Krasnoyarsk Krai.

He graduated from School No. 12 in Minusinsk. From 1991 to 1995, he studied at the Minusinsk Agricultural College, specializing in Agricultural Mechanization.

From 1994–1999 he studied at Khakassian State University, specializing in Jurisprudence.

1999–2001 he served as attorney at the Khakassian Republican Legal Consultation Office of the International Bar Association "Saint Petersburg".

From 2001 to September 2023, he was an attorney at the Bar Association of the Republic of Khakassia. Since 2021, he has been a member of the Council of the Bar Association of the Republic of Khakassia (his powers were suspended due to his resignation to the Federation Council).

He is Master of Sports of Russia in judo.

From 2007 to 2011, he was President of the Khakassia branch of the Federation of Judo of Russia.

From 2008 to 2013, he was a member of the fourth convocation of the Abakan City Council.

In 2023, he was awarded the title of "Honoured Lawyer of the Republic of Khakassia".

He has two sons.

In the field of advocacy and legal practice, he has been awarded certificates and letters of gratitude from the Council of the Bar Association of the Republic of Khakassia.

=== Politics ===
Zemtsov began his political career in 2008, becoming a deputy of the Abakan City Council.

In September 2023, he was elected to the Supreme Council of the Republic of Khakassia.

Following his election, Zemtsov was appointed a senator of the Russian Federation representing the executive branch of the Republic of Khakassia, thereby resigning from his previous parliamentary powers.

In the Federation Council, he served as a member of the Committee on Rules and Organization of Parliamentary Activities. On September 24, 2025, he was transferred to the Federation Council Committee on Constitutional Legislation and State Building.
