= Yury Biryukov =

Russian lawyer and politician

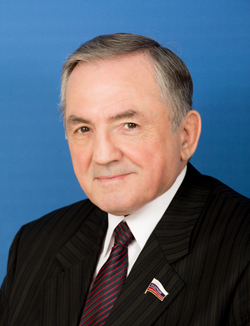
Portrait of Yury Stanislavovich Biryukov

Yury Stanislavovich Biryukov (in Russian: Юрий Станиславович Бирюков, b. March 7, 1948, in Lviv, Ukraine, Soviet Union) is a Russian lawyer and politician.

From June 7, 2000 to July 7, 2006, he was a First Deputy Prosecutor General of Russia. Since 2006 he has been a representative of the executive power branch of Nenets Autonomous Okrug in the Federation Council of Russia.

== See also ==
- Three Whales Corruption Scandal
