= Medal "For the Development of Siberia and the Far East" =

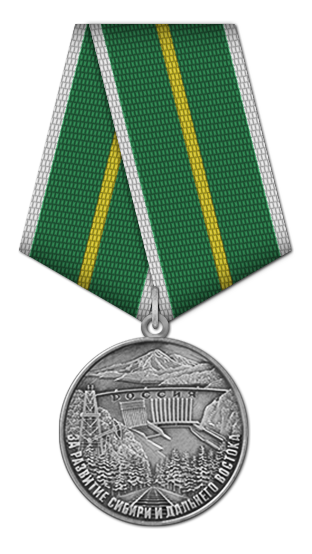
- Medal "For the Development of Siberia and the Far East" (obverse)
- Type: State Decoration
- Awarded for: Achievements in development of Siberia and the Far East
- Presented by: Russian Federation
- Eligibility: Russian citizens and foreign nationals
- Status: Active
- Established: August 29, 2022
- Ribbon of the Medal "For the Development of Siberia and the Far East"

Precedence
- Next (higher): Medal "For Merit in Space Exploration"
- Next (lower): Medal of the Order of Parental Glory

Medal "For the Development of Siberia and the Far East" (Russian: Медаль «За развитие Сибири и Дальнего Востока») is a state award of the Russian Federation. The medal is awarded to citizens of the Russian Federation for their contributions to the development of Siberia and the Far East, including in the areas of state development, economics, industrial production, transportation, energy, and information and telecommunications infrastructure, agriculture, science, culture, art, education, healthcare, environmental protection, and other areas. The Medal "For the Development of Siberia and the Far East" was established by Decree No. 587 of the President of the Russian Federation dated August 29, 2022. The same decree approved the medal's regulations and description.

== Regulations ==
The Medal "For the Development of Siberia and the Far East" may be awarded to foreign citizens for special services to the development of Siberia and the Far East.

The Medal "For the Development of Siberia and the Far East" is worn on the left chest and, if other medals of the Russian Federation are present, is placed after the Medal "For Merit in Space Exploration".

For special occasions and possible everyday wear, a miniature replica of the Medal "For the Development of Siberia and the Far East" is worn after a miniature replica of the Medal "For Merit in Space Exploration". When worn on a uniform, the ribbon of the Medal "For the Development of Siberia and the Far East" is worn on a bar after the ribbon of the Medal "For Merit in Space Exploration".

== Description ==
The Medal "For the Development of Siberia and the Far East" is made of silver. It is a circle 32 mm in diameter with a raised border on both sides. The obverse depicts a composition symbolizing the development of Siberia and the Far East. In the background, at the top of the medal, is a hill with the Sayano-Shushenskaya Dam in the background. Industrial facilities—an oil rig and an oil pump—are depicted on the left side of the medal. The foreground depicts a railroad leading into the center of a stylized image of the taiga. At the bottom of the medal, along the circumference, is a raised inscription: "FOR THE DEVELOPMENT OF SIBERIA AND THE FAR EAST".

On the reverse of the medal, against a raised image of the globe, is an outline image of Siberia and the Far East, along with the medal number.

The medal is attached by a loop and ring to a pentagonal ribbon bar, covered with a light green silk moiré ribbon with white stripes along the edges and a single longitudinal yellow stripe in the center.

The ribbon is 24 mm wide, and the white and yellow stripes are 2 mm wide.

When worn on uniform, the ribbon of the "For the Development of Siberia and the Far East" medal uses an 8 mm high bar, and the ribbon is 24 mm wide.

A miniature replica of the "For the Development of Siberia and the Far East" medal is worn on a ribbon bar. The diameter of the miniature replica is 16 mm.
