= Andrei Seryozhnikov =

- Андрей Серёжников
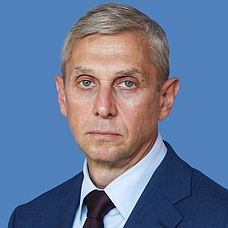

Senator from Tuva
- In office 13 September 2024 – Incumbent
- Preceded by: Andrey Bazilevsky

Personal details
- Born: 21 December 1966 (age 59) Cherkessk, RSFSR, Soviet Union
- Party: Independent
- Education: Kuban State University

Andrei Arturovich Seryozhnikov (Russian: Андрей Артурович Серёжников; born December 21, 1966, in Cherkessk, Karachay-Cherkessia Autonomous Okrug, RSFSR, USSR) is a Russian state security officer and political figure. He is a Senator of the Russian Federation (since 2024). He is a member of the Federation Council Committee on Defense and Security. He is a two-time recipient of the Order of Courage, a recipient of the Order "For Merit to the Fatherland," 4th Class, and holds a number of other top state awards. He holds the rank of Lieutenant General.

== Biography ==
Born December 21, 1966, in Cherkessk, USSR.

He graduated from Kuban State University in 1995 with a degree in Jurisprudence.

Since 1996, he has served in the state security agencies. Seryozhnikov rose through the ranks from an operative to the head of the FSB's territorial office. He served in the North Caucasus.

In 2013, he became head of the FSB Directorate for the Chechen Republic.

In 2016, he resigned as head of the FSB Directorate for the Chechen Republic, as announced by Chechen Republic Head Ramzan Kadyrov.

In 2016, he became head of the FSB Directorate for Khabarovsk Krai.

In 2022, he resigned as head of the FSB Directorate for Khabarovsk Krai.

On September 13, 2024, it was announced that Andrei Seryozhnikov would be appointed a senator to the Federation Council representing the executive branch of Khabarovsk Krai. This was announced by Khabarovsk Krai Governor Dmitry Demeshin after the inauguration ceremony.

Starting in 2024, Andrei Seryozhnikov was granted the powers of a senator to the Federation Council representing the government of Khabarovsk Krai. The document appointing him was signed by Khabarovsk Krai Governor Demeshin (Act No. 57 dated September 13, 2024). Seryozhnikov is a member of the Federation Council Committee on Defense and Security of the Federal Assembly of the Russian Federation (Resolution No. 391-SF dated September 25, 2024).

== Awards ==
- Order of Courage (1996);
- Order of Military Merit (2006);
- Order of Courage (2006);
- Medal of the Order "For Merit to the Fatherland", 2nd Class (2009);
- Order "For Merit to the Fatherland", 4th Class (2010);
- Order of Honour (2016).
- Order of Kadyrov (2013)
