= Vladimir Yedalov =

Russian politician (1954–2024)

- Владимир Едалов
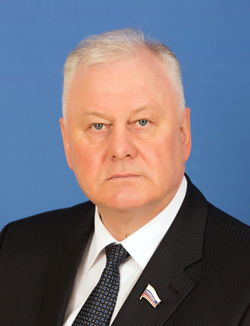

Member of the Federation Council from Penza Oblast
- In office 4 April 2013 – 21 September 2015
- Preceded by: Boris Spiegel

Personal details
- Born: Vladimir Fedorovich Yedalov; 18 June 1954 Penza, Russian SFSR, USSR
- Died: 1 March 2024 (aged 69)
- Party: United Russia

Vladimir Fedorovich Yedalov (Russian: Владимир Фёдорович Едалов; 18 June 1954 – 1 March 2024) was a Russian politician, representative of the executive body of state power of the Penza Region in Federation Council of the RF Federal Assembly (2013–2015), member of the Federation Council Committee on Constitutional Legislation, Legal and Judicial Issues, Development of Civil Society.

== Biography ==
Vladimir Yedalov was born on 18 June 1954, in the city of Penza. He began his career in 1972 in the experimental shop of the Electronic Computers Plant in Penza as an assembly fitter. He received his higher education in 1978 after graduating from Penza Factory Technical College under Electronic Computers Plant, a branch of Penza Polytechnic Institute, specializing as a mechanical engineer.

From December 1977 to 1984, he worked in the regional committee of the All-Union Leninist Young Communist League doing the Komsomol work.

For ten years starting from 1984, he conducted political work in the Directorate of Internal Affairs of the Penza region.

In 1994, he was appointed Head of the State Road Traffic Safety Inspection of the Directorate of Internal Affairs in the Penza region, police colonel. In 2009, he left his position.

He was elected a deputy of the Legislative Assembly of the Penza Region of the fifth convocation from electoral district No. 9, worked as a member of the Committee on State Construction and Local Self-Government Issues, Chairman of the Committee on Monitoring the Reliability of Information on Income, Property and Property Liabilities.

From May 2009 to May 2012, he was acting Head of the State Budgetary Institution "Transport Department of the Government of the Penza Region", then – until April 2013 – the State Budgetary Institution "Administration of the Governor and Government of the Penza Region".

In April 2013, he was delegated to the Federation Council. The powers were terminated earlier in September 2015. For two years of work in the Federation Council, he was a member of the Federation Council Committee on Constitutional Legislation, Legal and Judicial Issues, and the Development of Civil Society.

From 12 March 2016, he was Acting Head of Administration of the Sosnovoborsky District. His candidacy was proposed by the governor Ivan Belozertsev. On 6 April 2016, by the decision of the deputies, he became Head of Administration of the Sosnovoborsky District. On 5 June 2018, regional deputies re-approved him as Head of Administration.

His wife was Olga Nikolaevna. They have a daughter, Natalia. Their son Georgiy died on 5 July 2013.

Yedalov died on 1 March 2024, at the age of 69.
