= Valentina Petrenko =

Russian politician (born 1955)

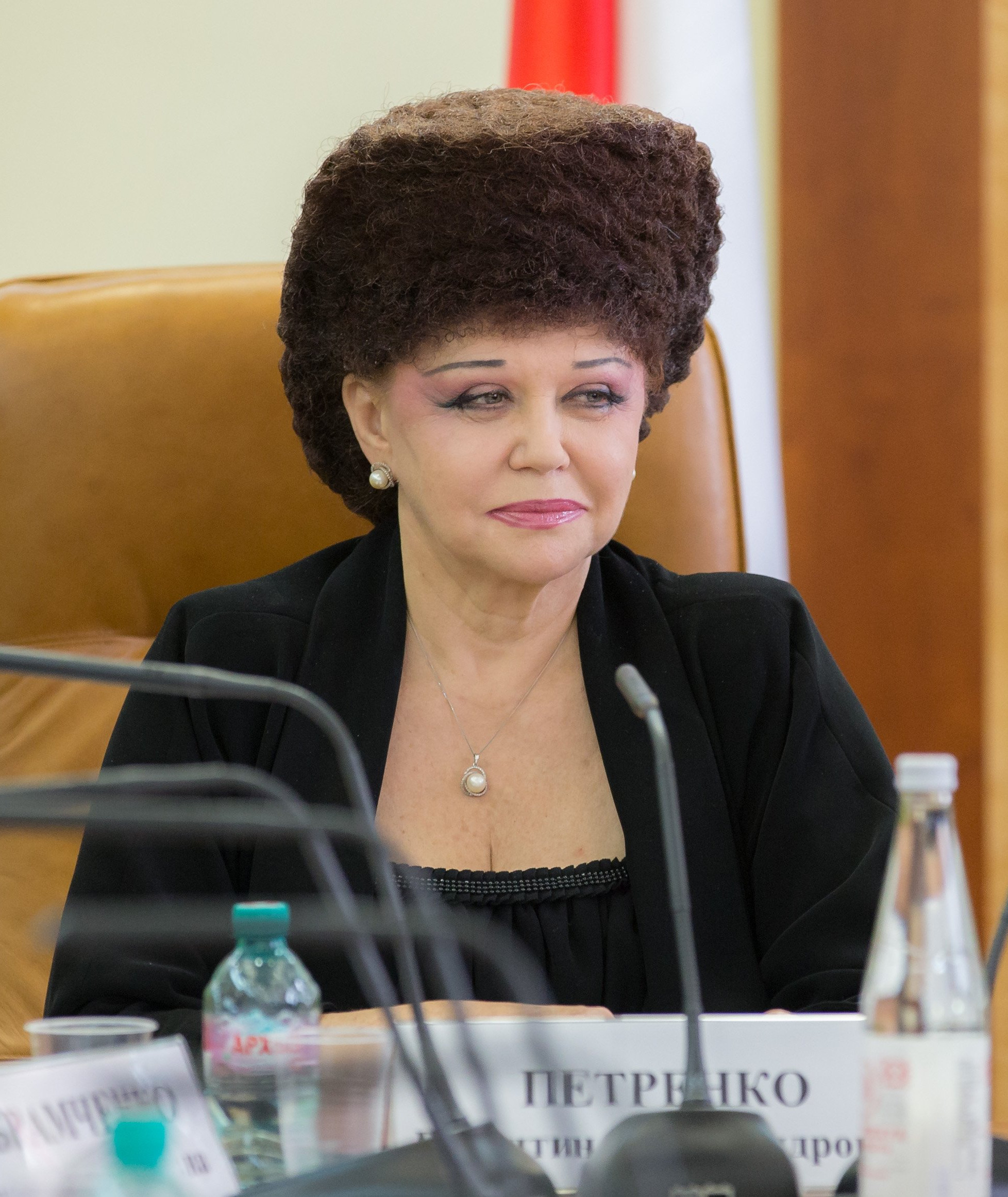
Petrenko in 2016.

Valentina Aleksandrovna Petrenko (Russian: Валентина Александровна Петренко; born 23 August 1955 in Kazakh SSR) is a Russian politician, who served as a Russian Federation Senator from Khakassia from 2001 to 2011. She served on the Committee on Social Policy and has a PhD in Education

Born in Kazakh SSR (now Kazakhstan), she is fluent in Russian, Polish, English, and Spanish. In 1977, she graduated from the Rostov State Pedagogical Institute, majoring in teacher of biology and chemistry.

She is famous for negotiating for the release of several child hostages in 1993, for which she earned the Order “For Personal Courage”. She is also known for her iconic hairstyle.

She is married and has one daughter.

She was awarded the Order of Honour.
