= Vitaly Nazarenko =

Russian politician (born 1977)

- Виталий Назаренко
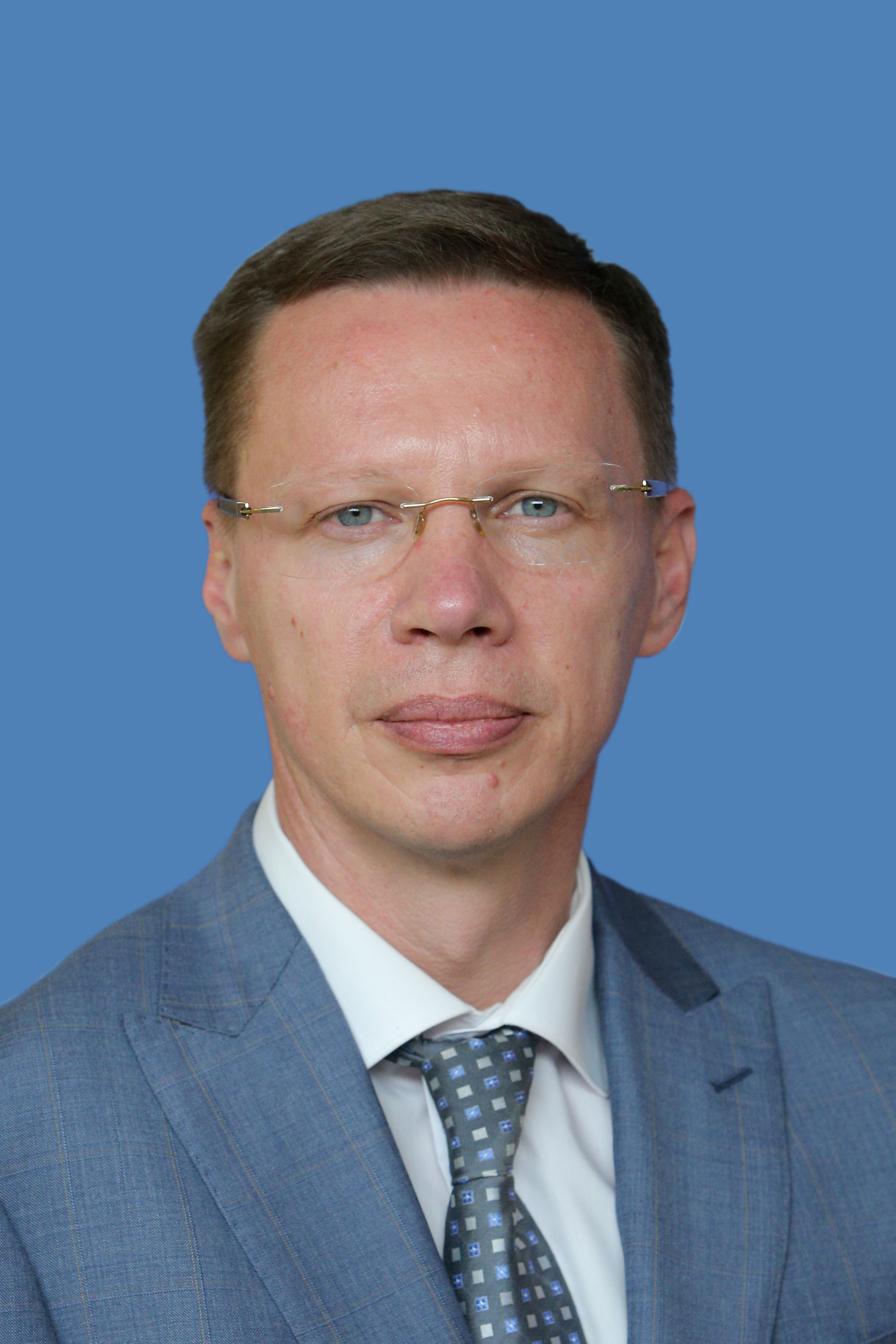

Senator from North Ossetia–Alania
- Incumbent
- Assumed office 29 September 2022
- Preceded by: Arsen Fadzaev

Personal details
- Born: Vitaly Nazarenko; 11 February 1977 (age 48) Vladikavkaz, North Ossetian Autonomous Soviet Socialist Republic, Soviet Union
- Political party: United Russia

Vitaly Viktorovich Nazarenko (Russian: Виталий Викторович Назаренко; born 11 February 1977) is a Russian politician serving as a senator from North Ossetia–Alania since 25 September 2018.

== Biography ==
Vitaly Nazarenko was born on 11 February 1977 in Vladikavkaz. In 1999, he graduated from the Vladikavkaz Mining and Metallurgical College. In 2014, he also received a degree from the Vladikavkaz Institute of Management and Law.

Before 2011, Nazarenko worked in various commercial enterprises as a supervisor, trading agent, and head of the sales department. From 2013 to 2017, he was also an instructor of the specialized children's and youth sports school of the Olympic reserve in taekwondo. At the same time, he was also a member of the Civic Chamber of the Republic of North Ossetia–Alania. In 2018–2021, he was engaged in private business. In 2021, he became the deputy of the Parliament of the Republic of North Ossetia–Alania of the 6th convocation. On 29 September 2022, he became the senator from the Parliament of the Republic of North Ossetia–Alania.

Vitaly Nazarenko is under personal sanctions introduced by the European Union and Switzerland for ratifying the decisions of the "Treaty of Friendship, Cooperation and Mutual Assistance between the Russian Federation and the Donetsk People's Republic and between the Russian Federation and the Luhansk People's Republic" and providing political and economic support for Russia's annexation of Ukrainian territories.
