= Vladimir Shapoval =

Russian politician

- Владимир Шаповал

Member of the Federation Council from the Executive Authority of Sakhalin Oblast
- In office 3 June 2004 – 21 September 2005
- Preceded by: Valery Goreglyad
- Succeeded by: Boris Agapov

Personal details
- Born: Vladimir Ivanovich Shapoval; 17 October 1953 (age 73) Soviet Union

Vladimir Ivanovich Shapoval (Russian: Владимир Иванович Шаповал; born on 17 October 1953), is a Russian politician who served as a member of the Russian Federation Council from the Executive Authority of Sakhalin Oblast from 2004 to 2005.

== Biography ==
Vladimir Shapoval was born on 17 October 1953. He has higher professional education, candidate of sociological sciences.

He graduated from the Kyiv Trade and Economics Institute.

He was awarded the Order of Honour (Russia), Honor of the Government of the Russian Federation, and the Order of Friendship in 2003.

On 3 June 2004, Shapoval became the Member of the Federation Council from the Executive Authority of Sakhalin Oblast. He left office on 21 September 2005.
