= Mukharby Ulbashev =

Russian politician (born 1960)

- Мухарбий Ульбашев
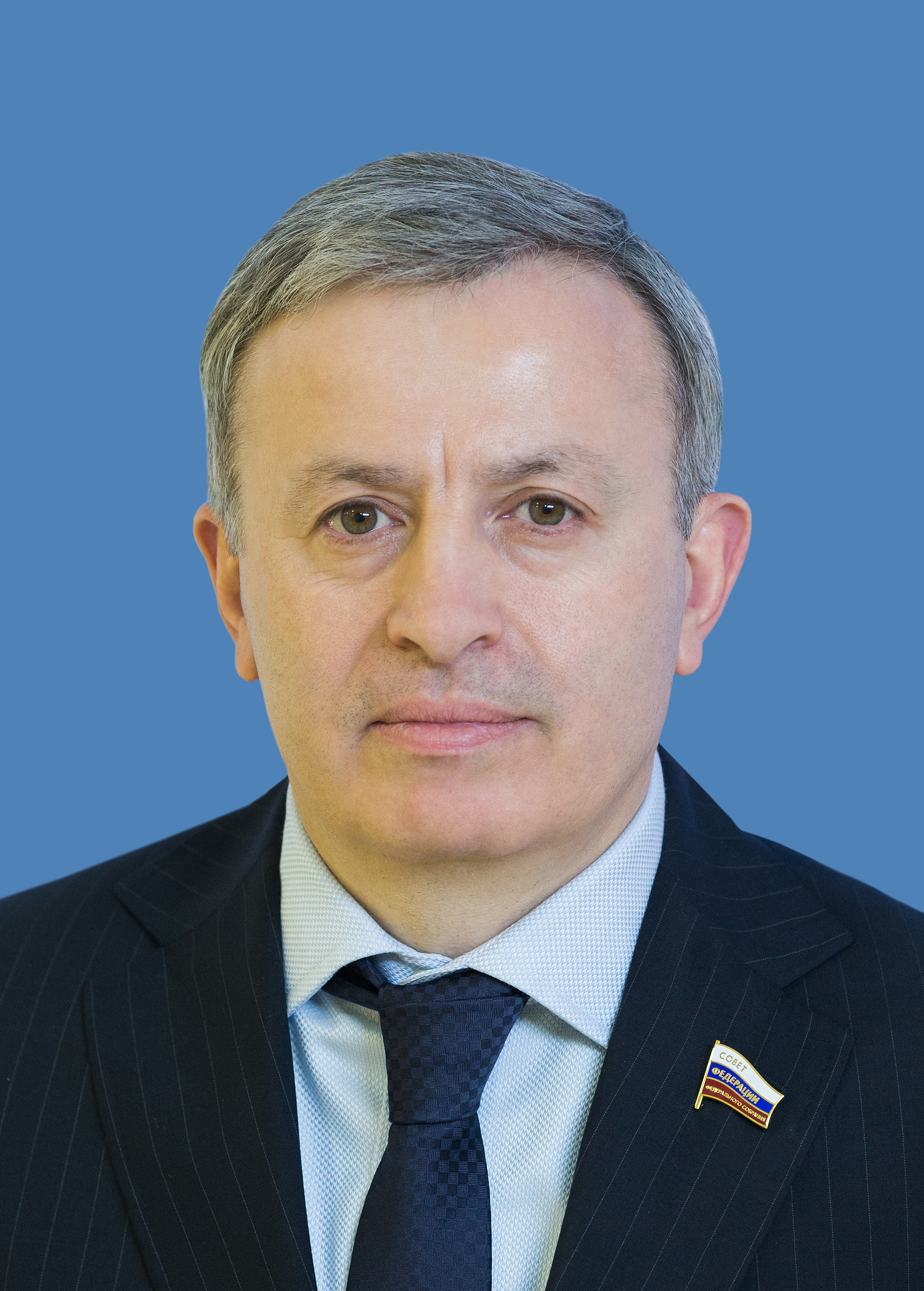

Senator from Kabardino-Balkaria
- Incumbent
- Assumed office 23 September 2019
- Preceded by: Arsen Kanokov

Personal details
- Born: Mukharby Ulbashev; 15 May 1960 (age 66) Kabardino-Balkarian Autonomous Soviet Socialist Republic, Soviet Union
- Party: United Russia
- Education: Kabardino-Balkaria State Agrarian University

Mukharby Magomedovich Ulbashev (Russian: Мухарбий Магомедович Ульбашев; born 15 May 1960) is a Russian politician serving as a senator from Kabardino-Balkaria since 23 September 2019.

== Biography ==
Mukharbii Ulbashev was born on 15 May 1960 in Kabardino-Balkarian Autonomous Soviet Socialist Republic. In 1982, he graduated from the Kabardino-Balkaria State Agrarian University. Afterward he worked as a doctor in the Kabardino-Balkarian sanitary and veterinary detachment. From 1987 to 1990, he was the secretary of the Kabardino-Balkarian branch of Komsomol. From 1990 to 1993, he was the Chairman of the Permanent Commission of the Supreme Council of the Kabardino-Balkarian Republic. In 1995, he was elected deputy of the State Duma of the Russian Empire of the Second Convocation. From 2000 to 2001, Ulbashev was appointed as an advisor to the Head of the Kabardino-Balkarian Republic. Later he became a senator from Kabardino-Balkaria. In 2014 and 2021, he was re-appointed to this position.

=== Sanctions ===
Ulbashev is under personal sanctions introduced by the European Union, the United Kingdom, the USA, Canada, Switzerland, Australia, Ukraine, New Zealand, for ratifying the decisions of the "Treaty of Friendship, Cooperation and Mutual Assistance between the Russian Federation and the Donetsk People's Republic and between the Russian Federation and the Luhansk People’s Republic" and providing political and economic support for Russia's annexation of Ukrainian territories.
