= Olga Bas =

Russian politician (born 1964)

- Ольга Бас
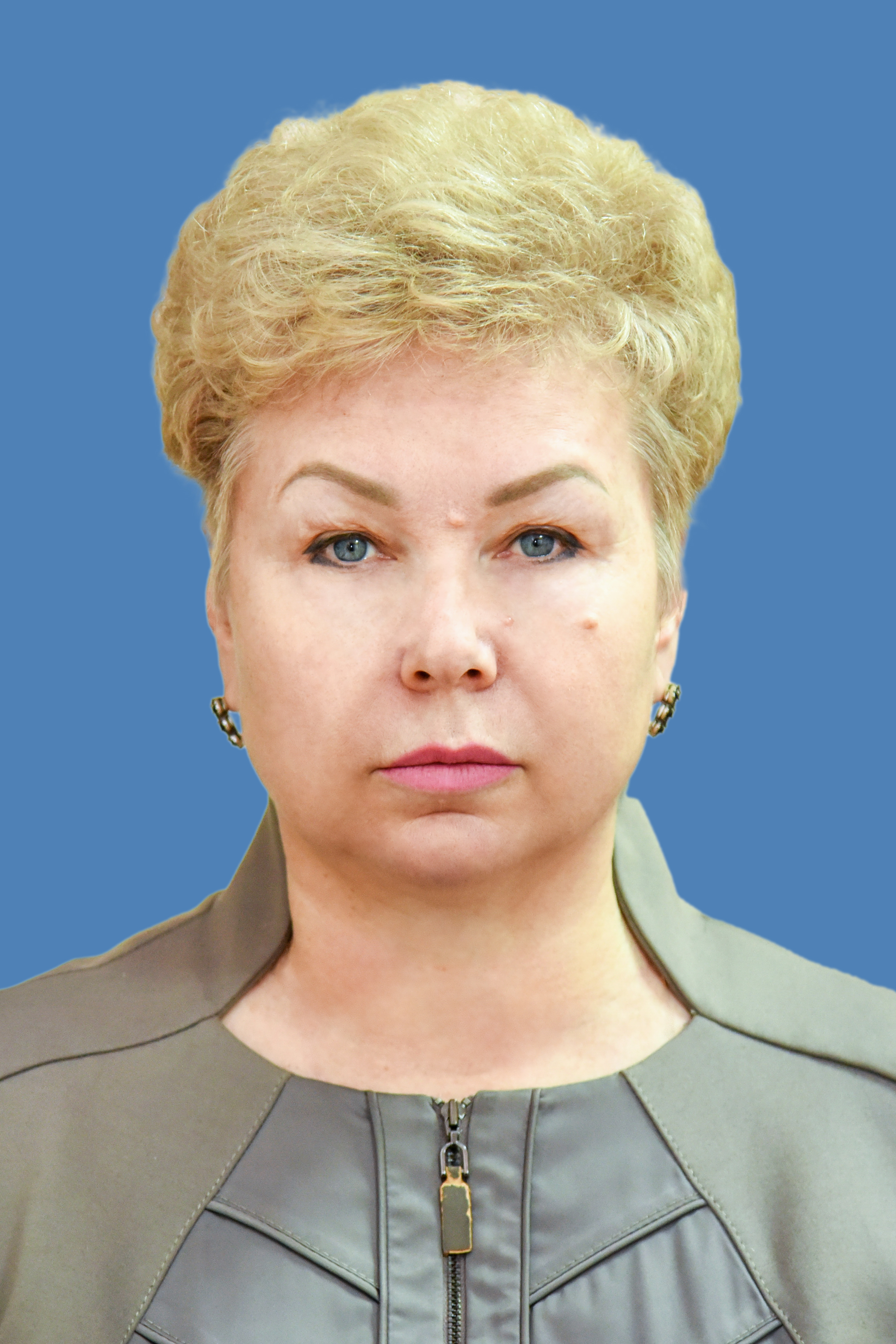

Senator of the legislative authority of the Luhansk People's Republic
- Incumbent
- Assumed office 20 December 2020
- Preceded by: Office established

Personal details
- Born: Olga Yegenyevna Bas; 27 February 1964 (age 62) Nolinsk, Russia, Soviet Union

Olga Yegenyevna Bas (Russian: Ольга Евгеньевна Бас; born on 27 February 1964), is a politician who is serving as the senator of the legislative authority of the Luhansk People's Republic since 20 December 2022.

== Biography ==
Olga Bas was born on 27 February 1964 in Nolinsk. In 1989, she graduated from the Kharkiv Law Institute named after F. E. Dzerzhinsky, and worked in the prosecutor's office of the Leninsky district of Luhansk, then in the regional department of justice. In 1995, she became a judge of the Leninsky District Court in Luhansk.

In 2002, she became a judge of the Criminal Chamber of the Court of Appeal of Luhansk Oblast. By 2013, she taught at the National School of Judges of Ukraine; with the outbreak of the conflict in Donbas, she remained in the Luhansk People's Republic, since 2014 she worked at the Ministry of State Security, supervising the judicial direction. On 7 December 2017, she became head of the administration of the head of the Donetsk People's Republic. She was elected a deputy of the People's Council of the Luhansk People's Republic.

On 20 December 2022, the deputies of the People's Council approved Bas as a senator of the Luhansk People's Republic, a representative of the republic's legislative body in the Federation Council, and on December 23, during a meeting of the Federation Council, she is confirmed to the chamber.
