= Yury Fedorov =

Russian politician (born 1972)

- Юрий Фёдоров
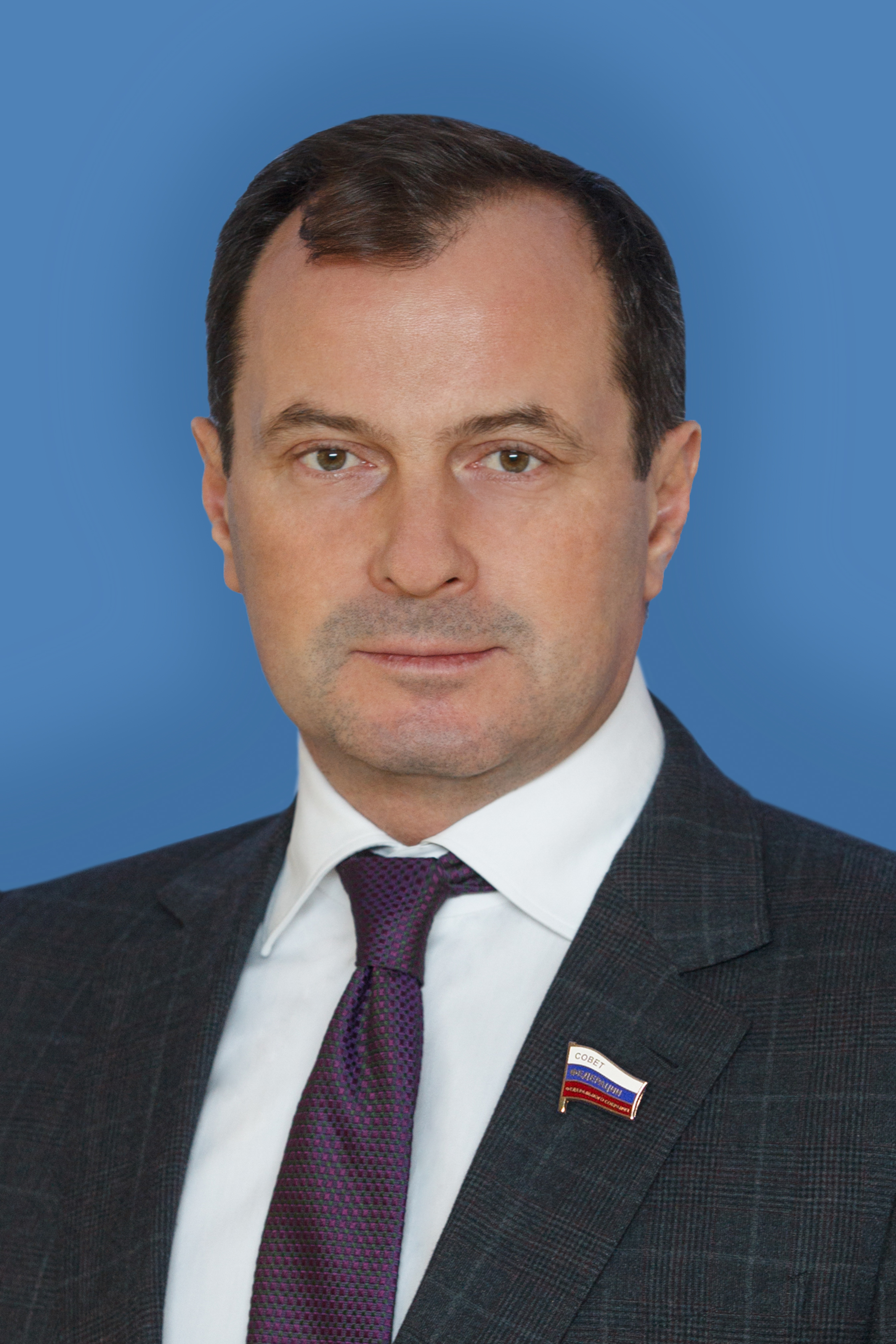

Senator from Udmurtia
- Incumbent
- Assumed office 5 October 2022
- Preceded by: Alexander Volkov

Personal details
- Born: Yury Fedorov; 1 January 1972 (age 54) Saky Raion, Crimea in the Soviet Union, Ukrainian Soviet Socialist Republic, Soviet Union
- Party: United Russia
- Education: Ufa State Petroleum Technological University

Yury Viktorovich Fedorov (Russian: Юрий Викторович Фёдоров; born 1 January 1972) is a Russian politician serving as a senator from Udmurtia since 5 October 2022.

== Biography ==
Yury Fedorov was born on 1 January 1972 in Saky Raion, Crimea. In 1995, he graduated from the Ufa State Petroleum Technological University. In 2008, he also received a degree from the Udmurt State University. From 1995 to 2000, he was an operator oil and gas operator in Khanty-Mansi Autonomous Okrug. From 2008 to 2017, Fedorov headed the Belkamneft LLC that specialized in extraction and treatment of oil in the territory of Udmurtia, Bashkortostan and the Kirov Oblast. From 2010 to 2017, Fedorov was the deputy of the State Council of the Udmurt Republic of the 4th and 5th convocations. On 10 September 2017, he became the senator from the State Council of the Udmurt Republic. On 5 October 2022, he was re-elected for the same position.

Yury Fedorov is under personal sanctions introduced by the European Union, the United Kingdom, the USA, Canada, Switzerland, Australia, Ukraine, New Zealand, for ratifying the decisions of the "Treaty of Friendship, Cooperation and Mutual Assistance between the Russian Federation and the Donetsk People's Republic and between the Russian Federation and the Luhansk People's Republic" and providing political and economic support for Russia's annexation of Ukrainian territories.
