= Platnirovskaya =

Platnirovskaya Платнировская
- Stanitsa
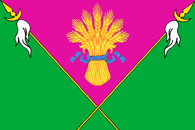
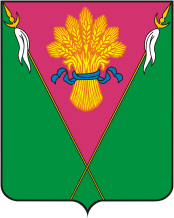
- Flag Coat of arms
- Interactive map of Platnirovskaya
- Location of Platnirovskaya Platnirovskaya (Krasnodar Krai)
- Coordinates: 45°23′45″N 39°23′05″E
- Country: Russia
- Federal subject: Krasnodar Krai
- Administrative district: Korenovsky District
- Founded: 1794
- Elevation: 34 m (112 ft)

Population (2010 Census)
  - Total: 12,004
  - Estimate (2021): 12,193 (+1.6%)
- Time zone: UTC+3 (MSK)
- Postal codes: 353177, 353178
- OKTMO ID: 03621419101

Platnirovskaya (Russian: Платнировская) is a rural locality (a stanitsa) in Korenovsky District of Krasnodar Krai, Russia. Population: 12,004 (2010 census); 11,561 (2002 census).
