= Valentin Zavadnikov =

Russian politician (born 1963)

- Валентин Завадников
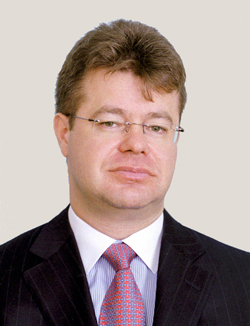

Senator from Saratov Oblast
- In office 30 January 2002 – 25 November 2011
- Succeeded by: Mikhail Isayev

Personal details
- Born: Valentin Zavadnikov; 30 April 1963 (age 63) Kryvyi Rih, Dnipropetrovsk Oblast, Ukrainian SSR, Soviet Union
- Education: Maritime State University

Valentin Georgievich Zavadnikov (Russian: Валентин Георгиевич Завадников; born 30 April 1963) is a Russian politician who served as a senator from Saratov Oblast from 2002 to 2011.

== Career ==
Valentin Zavadnikov was born on 30 April 1963 in Kryvyi Rih, Dnipropetrovsk Oblast. In 1985, he graduated from the Maritime State University. Afterward, he worked at the Primorsky Shipping Company of the city of Nakhodka, Primorsky Krai. From 1997 to 2001, he was a member of the Commission under the President of the Russian Federation for the preparation of agreements on the delimitation of jurisdiction and powers between federal state authorities and state authorities of the constituent entities of the Russian Federation. From January 2002 to November 2011, he represented Saratov Oblast in the Federation Council.
