= Alexey Sitnikov (politician, born 1966) =

Russian politician

- Алексей Ситников
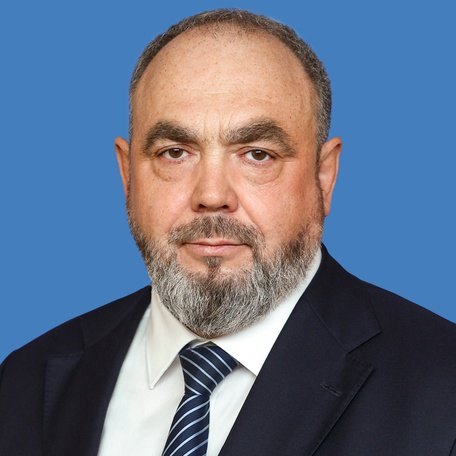

Senator from Yamalo-Nenets Autonomous Okrug
- Incumbent
- Assumed office 26 September 2025
- Preceded by: Grigory Ledkov

Personal details
- Born: 20 November 1955 (age 70) Lyangasovo, RSFSR, Soviet Union
- Party: United Russia
- Education: Tyumen State University of Architecture and Civil Engineering; Russian Presidential Academy of National Economy and Public Administration
- Awards: Medal of the Order "For Merit to the Fatherland"

Alexey Viktorovich Sitnikov (Russian: Алексей Ситников; born August 25, 1966, in Lyangasovo) is a Russian politician, a senator of the Federation Council and a representative of the legislative branch of the Yamalo-Nenets Autonomous Okrug. He is a member of the Federation Council Committee on Federal Structure, Regional Policy, Local Self-Government, and Northern Affairs.

== Biography ==
He was born on August 25, 1966, in the village of Lyangasovo, Leninsky District, Kirov Oblast.

In 1994, he graduated from the Tyumen Civil Engineering Institute with a degree in Road and Airfield Construction.

In 2005, he completed retraining at the Russian Presidential Academy of National Economy and Public Administration, specializing in Public and Municipal Administration.

He worked in construction and oil and gas production companies in Novy Urengoy and Nadym, rising from a mechanic and driver to chief engineer and director of a large enterprise.

From 2010 to March 2012, he served as First Deputy Head of the Municipal Formation of Novy Urengoy.

On April 12, 2012, he was elected Head of the Nadymsky District Administration.

From May 2013 to September 2020, he was First Deputy Governor of the Yamalo-Nenets Autonomous Okrug.

From 2013 to 2025, he served as Secretary of the Yamalo-Nenets Regional Branch of the United Russia party.
