= Vladimir Germanenko =

Russian politician (1944–2026)

Vladimir Sergeyevich Germanenko (Russian: Владимир Сергеевич Германенко; 22 February 1944 – 26 August 2026) was a Russian politician.

== Life and career ==
From 1984 to 1991, he held the position of Deputy Chairman of the Regional Executive Committee, before serving as the First Deputy Head of the Administration of the Altai Republic. Between 2001 and 2008, he served as a senator.

Germanenko died 26 August 2026, at the age of 82.
