= Ratmir Aybazov =

Russian politician (born 1955)

- Ратмир Айбазов
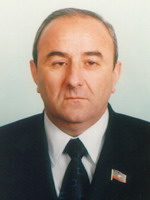

Senator from Karachay-Cherkessia
- In office 17 June 2009 – 7 April 2011
- Preceded by: Oleg Shurdumov
- Succeeded by: Vyacheslav Derev

Senator from Karachay-Cherkessia
- In office 16 November 2001 – June 2009
- Succeeded by: Zubar Dokshokov

Personal details
- Born: Ratmir Aybazov; 12 April 1955 (age 71) Bayzak District, Jambyl Region, Kazakh Soviet Socialist Republic, Soviet Union
- Party: United Russia
- Education: Saratov State Academy of Law

Ratmir Umarovich Aybazov (Russian: Ратмир Умарович Айбазов; born 12 April 1955) is a Russian politician who served as a senator from Karachay-Cherkessia from 2001 to 2011.

== Career ==
Ratmir Aybazov was born on 12 April 1955 in Bayzak District, Jambyl Region, Kazakh Soviet Socialist Republic. He graduated from the Saratov State Academy of Law. Afterwards, he founded the company "Karachai". In August 1999, the prosecutor's office of the Karachay-Cherkessia initiated a criminal case against Aybazov under article 159 of the Criminal Code of the Russian Federation (fraud on an especially large scale). However, soon after that, the case was closed due to lack of corpus delicti. In 1995 and 1999, Aybazov was elected deputy of the People's Assembly of Karachay-Cherkessia. From 2001 to 2011, he served as senator from Karachay-Cherkessia.
