= Mikhail Mikheyev =

Soviet physicist (1905–1989)

- Born: Mikhail Nikolayevich Mikheyev; 28 October 1905; Zuyevka, Slobodskoy Uyezd, Vyatka Governorate, Russian Empire
- Died: 27 August 1989 (aged 83); Sverdlovsk, RSFSR, Soviet Union
- Citizenship: USSR
- Education: Leningrad State University (1930)
- Scientific career
- Fields: Physics of metals
- Workplaces: Physics of Metals Institute of Ural Division of the Russian Academy of Sciences, Ioffe Institute

Mikhail Nikolayevich Mikheyev (Russian: Михаил Николаевич Михеев; 28 October 1905 – 27 August 1989) was a Soviet physicist, physics of metals expert, corresponding member of RAS (since 1979).

== Biography ==
He was born at Zuyevka Station, now part of Kirov Oblast. He graduated from Leningrad State University in 1930. Then he worked at Ioffe Institute (1928–1932), Ural Institute of Physico-Technical Institute (UPTI, now the Physics of Metals Institute of Ural Division of the Russian Academy of Sciences) as its first director from 1932, when he was a postgraduate student, until 1948, and from 1953 until 1986. He was also a member of the Sverdlovsk Oblast Council (1963–1971).

Mikheyev died in 1989, at the age of 83. He was buried at Sverdlovsk.

== Scientific effort ==
Authority on magnetism, ferromagnetism, magnetic structure analysis, magnetic flaw detection etc.

Author of more than 200 scientific publications, including more than 20 monographs and 11 authors certificates, like:

- Магнитные методы структурного анализа и неразрушающего контроля. (Magnetic methods of structure analysis and nondestructive inspection) — M., 1992

== Awards ==
- Medal "For Valiant Labour in the Great Patriotic War 1941–1945" (1945)
- Two Orders of the Badge of Honour (1945, 1954)
- Stalin Prize, 3rd class (1951) — for development and integration into industry new methods of quality control of the steelworks
- Order of the October Revolution (1971)
- Order of the Red Banner of Labour (1975)
- Order of Lenin (1983)
