= List of rural localities in Khakassia =

Map of Russia with Khakassia highlighted

This is a list of rural localities in Khakassia. Khakassia (Russian: Хакасия; Khakas: Хакасия), officially the Republic of Khakassia (Russian: Республика Хакасия, tr. Respublika Khakasiya, pronounced [rʲɪˈspublʲɪkə xɐˈkasʲɪjə]; Khakas: Хакас Республиказы, tr. Xakas Respublikazı), is a federal subject (a republic) of Russia. Its capital city is Abakan, which is also the largest city in the republic. As of the 2010 Census, the republic's population was 532,403.

== Altaysky District ==
Rural localities in Altaysky District

- Bely Yar

== Askizsky District ==
Rural localities in Askizsky District:

- Abramov
- Askiz
- Poltakov

== Beysky District ==
Rural localities in Beysky District:

- Beya

== Bogradsky District ==
Rural localities in Bogradsky District:

- Abakano-Perevoz
- Bograd

== Ordzhonikidzevsky District ==
Rural localities in Ordzhonikidzevsky District

- Kopyovo

== Shirinsky District ==
Rural localities in Shirinsky District:

- Shira

== Tashtypsky District ==
Rural localities in Tashtypsky District:

- Tashtyp

== See also ==
- Lists of rural localities in Russia
