= Administrative divisions of Khakassia =

Administrative districts of Russian federal subject

Republic of Khakassia Russia
- Capital: Abakan

Administrative structure (as of 2012)
- Districts: 8
- Cities/towns: 5
- Urban-type settlements: 12
- Selsovets: 81

Municipal structure (as of 2002)
- Rural settlements: 254 (inhabited); 1 (uninhabited)

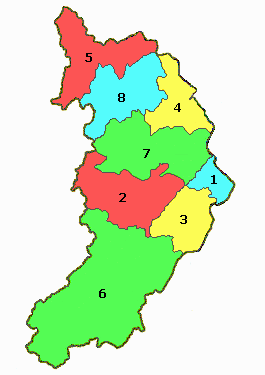
Map of Khakassia (with numbered)

Republic of Khakassia is a federal subject of Russia.

== Administrative and municipal divisions ==
Map

Division	Structure		OKATO	OKTMO	Urban-type settlement/ resort settlement*	Rural (selsovet)
Division	Administrative	Municipal	OKATO	OKTMO	Urban-type settlement/ resort settlement*	Rural (selsovet)
Abakan (Абакан)	city	urban okrug	95 401	95 701		
Abaza (Абаза)	city	urban okrug	95 402	95 702		
Sayanogorsk (Саяногорск)	city	urban okrug	95 408	95 708	Cheryomushki (Черёмушки); Mayna (Майна)	
Sorsk (Сорск)	city	urban okrug	95 409	95 709		
Chernogorsk (Черногорск)	city	urban okrug	95 415	95 715	Prigorsk (Пригорск)	
Altaysky (Алтайский)	district		95 205	95 605		10
Askizsky (Аскизский)	district		95 208	95 608	Askiz (Аскиз); Biskamzha (Бискамжа); Vershina Tyoi (Вершина Тёи)	11
Beysky (Бейский)	district		95 212	95 612		9
Bogradsky (Боградский)	district		95 215	95 615		11
Ordzhonikidzevsky (Орджоникидзевский)	district		95 220	95 620	Kopyovo (Копьёво)	8
Tashtypsky (Таштыпский)	district		95 225	95 625		9
Ust-Abakansky (Усть-Абаканский)	district		95 230	95 630	Ust-Abakan (Усть-Абакан)	12
Shirinsky (Ширинский)	district		95 235	95 635	Kommunar (Коммунар); Shira (Шира); Tuim (Туим); Zhemchuzhny (Жемчужный) resort settlement*	11
