= Bely Yar =

Bely Yar (Russian: Бе́лый Яр) is the name of several inhabited localities in Russia.

== Modern localities ==
Urban localities

- Bely Yar, Khanty-Mansi Autonomous Okrug, an urban-type settlement in Surgutsky District of Khanty-Mansi Autonomous Okrug
- Bely Yar, Verkhneketsky District, Tomsk Oblast, a work settlement in Verkhneketsky District, Tomsk Oblast

Rural localities

- Bely Yar, Amur Oblast, a selo in Beloyarovsky Rural Settlement of Zavitinsky District of Amur Oblast
- Bely Yar, Kaliningrad Oblast, a settlement under the administrative jurisdiction of the town of district significance of Pravdinsk in Pravdinsky District of Kaliningrad Oblast
- Bely Yar, Republic of Khakassia, a selo in Beloyarsky Selsoviet of Altaysky District of the Republic of Khakassia
- Bely Yar (selo), Achinsky District, Krasnoyarsk Krai, a selo in Beloyarsky Selsoviet of Achinsky District of Krasnoyarsk Krai
- Bely Yar (settlement), Achinsky District, Krasnoyarsk Krai, a settlement in Beloyarsky Selsoviet of Achinsky District of Krasnoyarsk Krai
- Bely Yar, Kuraginsky District, Krasnoyarsk Krai, a village in Murinsky Selsoviet of Kuraginsky District of Krasnoyarsk Krai
- Bely Yar, Kurgan Oblast, a village in Bolshechausovsky Selsoviet of Ketovsky District of Kurgan Oblast
- Bely Yar, Omsk Oblast, a settlement in Beloyarsky Rural Okrug of Tevrizsky District of Omsk Oblast
- Bely Yar, Sverdlovsk Oblast, a settlement in Artyomovsky District of Sverdlovsk Oblast
- Bely Yar, Teguldetsky District, Tomsk Oblast, a settlement in Teguldetsky District, Tomsk Oblast

== Historical localities ==
- Bely Yar, a town or fort on the Volga between Simbirsk and Stavropol which was the east end of the Trans-Kama Line of forts; located within today's Ulyanovsk Oblast at 53.973051°N 48.907013°E, opposite Sengiley

== See also ==
- Beloyarsky (disambiguation)
- Beloyarsk
