= Askiz =

Askiz may refer to:

- Askiz (urban-type settlement), an urban-type settlement in Askizsky District of the Republic of Khakassia, Russia
- Askiz (rural locality), a rural locality (selo) in Askizsky District of the Republic of Khakassia, Russia
- Askiz River, a river in the Republic of Khakassia, Russia
