= Ust-Abakansky =

Ust-Abakansky (masculine), Ust-Abakanskaya (feminine), or Ust-Abakanskoye (neuter) may refer to:

- Ust-Abakansky District, a district in the Republic of Khakassia, Russia
- Ust-Abakanskoye, name of the city of Abakan in 1823–1931
