= Abakan (disambiguation) =

Abakan is the capital city of the Republic of Khakassia, Russia.

Abakan may also refer to:

- Abakan River, a river in Krasnoyarsk Krai, Russia
- Abakan International Airport, an airport in the Republic of Khakassia, Russia
- Abakan-Avia, a Russian cargo airline
- Abakan Range, a mountain range in Siberia, Russia
- Abakan, alternative name of AN-94, a modern Russian assault rifle
- Abakans, fiber sculptures of Polish artist Magdalena Abakanowicz
- Project Abakan, assault rifle selection trials held in Russia
