= Beya =

Beya may refer to:

- Heya (sumo), an organization of sumo wrestlers (pronounced beya in compound form)
- Beya (rural locality), a rural locality (selo) in the Republic of Khakassia, Russia
- Béya, a village in Sangha-Mbaéré Prefecture, Central African Republic.
