= Ketovo =

Ketovo (Russian: Кетово) is the name of several rural localities in Russia:

- Ketovo, Kurgan Oblast, a selo in Ketovsky Selsoviet of Ketovsky District of Kurgan Oblast
- Ketovo, Yaroslavl Oblast, a village in Sevastyantsevsky Rural Okrug of Breytovsky District of Yaroslavl Oblast
