= Abakan–Taishet Railway =

Railway line in Russia

Overview
- Locale: Russia

Technical
- Track gauge: 1,520 mm (4 ft 11 27/32 in) Russian gauge

The Abakan-Taishet Railway is a railway built between 1959 and 1965, connecting Abakan with Tayshet on the Trans-Siberian Railway. It lies in Krasnoyarsk Krai along with parts of the Republic of Khakassia and Irkutsk Oblast. The line is a continuation of the Novokuznetsk - Abakan Railway which was built between 1949 and 1950. Construction of the Abakan-Taishet Railway was announced as a Komsomol shock construction project, and young workers came from all parts of the Soviet Union to build the line.

Distances to points along the line are measured in kilometers beginning at Novokuznetsk.

== Route ==
Map of Abakan-Taishet railway

The length of the Abakan-Taishet Railway is 647 kilometres (402 mi), while the length of the whole Novokuznetsk-Taishet Railway is 1,034 kilometres (642 mi). From Abakan to Kuragino, the railway goes in the easterly direction, through Minusinsk Hollow, through a forested area to arrive at Kuragino station. From Kuragino to Sayanskaya Station, the railway goes to the north-east, passing through Eastern Sayan Mountains. After Sayanskaya Station, the railway goes east, south of and parallel to the Trans-Siberian Railway, for around 250 kilometres (160 mi) to the city of Taishet, where it ends.

== Construction ==
The idea of building a railroad through the Sayan Mountains first came about in the nineteenth century. However, study of the character of the terrain repeatedly caused the project to be rejected. Experts of the time believed the project to be infeasible due to the difficult terrain.

Planning for the line did not resume until 1935. Five routes were proposed, of which the Tayshet and Nizhneudinsk routes were considered the best.
