= Abramov, Askizsky District, Khakassia =

Abramov Абрамов
- Aul
- Location within Khakassia Location within Russia
- Coordinates: 52°59′N 90°08′E
- Country: Russia
- Region: Khakassia
- District: Askizsky District
- Time zone: [[UTC+7:00]] (CET)

Abramov (Russian: Абрамов; Khakas: Абрамнар аалы, Abramnar aalı) is a rural locality (an aul) in Askizsky District, Khakassia, Russia. The population was 59 as of 2010. There is 1 street.

== Geography ==
Abramov is located 37 km southwest of Askiz (the district's administrative centre) by road. Poltakov is the nearest rural locality.
