= Poltakov =

Poltakov Полтаков
- Town

Other transcription(s)
  - Khakas: Полтах
- Interactive map of Poltakov
- Location of Poltakov Poltakov (Khakassia)
- Coordinates: 52°57′20.6″N 90°11′13.8″E
- Country: Russia
- Federal subject: Khakassia
- Administrative district: Askizsky District

Population (2010 Census)
  - Total: 1,151
  - Estimate (2010): 1,151 (0%)
- Time zone: UTC+7 (MSK+4)
- Postal code: 655703
- OKTMO ID: 95608420101

Poltakov (Russian: Полтаков, Poltakov; Khakas: Полтах, Poltax) is a village (a selo) in the Askizsky District of the Republic of Khakassia, Russia. The village is located 27 kilometers (17 mi) from the regional center of the village of Askiz (urban-type settlement). It is located on the northern side of Mount Pistag, the Es' River flows along the village. Population: 1,151 (2010 census); 1,191 (2002 census);

== History ==
The village was formed by the merger of several aals - Poltakh, Tirenchin, Khubachakov, and Ust-Teya - at the beginning of the 20th century. The Khakas name of the village, Poltakh, came from Todinov Poltakh, a rich cattle merchant.

== Demographics ==
The village of Poltakov is made up of Khakas people forming the majority at 88% and Russian people forming a minority at 12%
