= Abakano-Perevoz =

Abakano-Perevoz Абакано-Перевоз
- Village
- Location within Khakassia Location within Russia
- Coordinates: 54°16′N 91°18′E
- Country: Russia
- Region: Khakassia
- District: Bogradsky District
- Time zone: [[UTC+7:00]]

Abakano-Perevoz (Russian: Абакано-Перевоз) is a rural locality (a selo) in Troitsky Selsoviet of Bogradsky District, Russia. The population was 149 as of 2018. There are 14 streets.

== Geography ==
Abakano-Perevoz is located 33 km east of Bograd (the district's administrative centre) by road. Troitskoye is the nearest rural locality.
