= Daria Malygina =

Russian volleyball player

Personal information
- Full name: Daria Nikolaevna Malygina
- Nationality: Russia
- Born: 4 April 1994 (age 32); Abaza, Russia
- Height: 2 m (6 ft 7 in)
- Weight: 82 kg (181 lb)
- Spike: 317 cm (125 in)
- Block: 305 cm (120 in)

Volleyball information
- Position: Opposite
- Current club: Dinamo Kazan
- Number: 4 (club); 6 (national team)

National team
2016–	Russia
- Last updated: 19 January 2017

Daria Nikolaevna Malygina (Russian: Дарья Николаевна Малыгина; born 4 April 1994 in Abaza) is a Russian volleyball player. She was part of the Russia women's national volleyball team at the 2016 FIVB Volleyball World Grand Prix in Thailand and the 2016 Summer Olympics in Rio de Janeiro.

At club level, she played for Dinamo Kazan before moving to Zarechie Odintsovo in November 2015.

== Clubs ==
- (Russia) Dinamo Kazan-2 (2011–2013)
- (Russia) Dinamo Kazan (2013–2015)
- (Russia) Zarechie Odintsovo (2015–2017)
- (Russia) Dinamo Kazan (2017–2018)

== Awards ==
=== Clubs ===
- 2014–15 Russian Championship – Gold medal (with Dinamo Kazan)
