= Biskamzha =

Biskamzha Бискамжа
- Urban-type settlement

Other transcription(s)
  - Khakas: Пис хамҷы
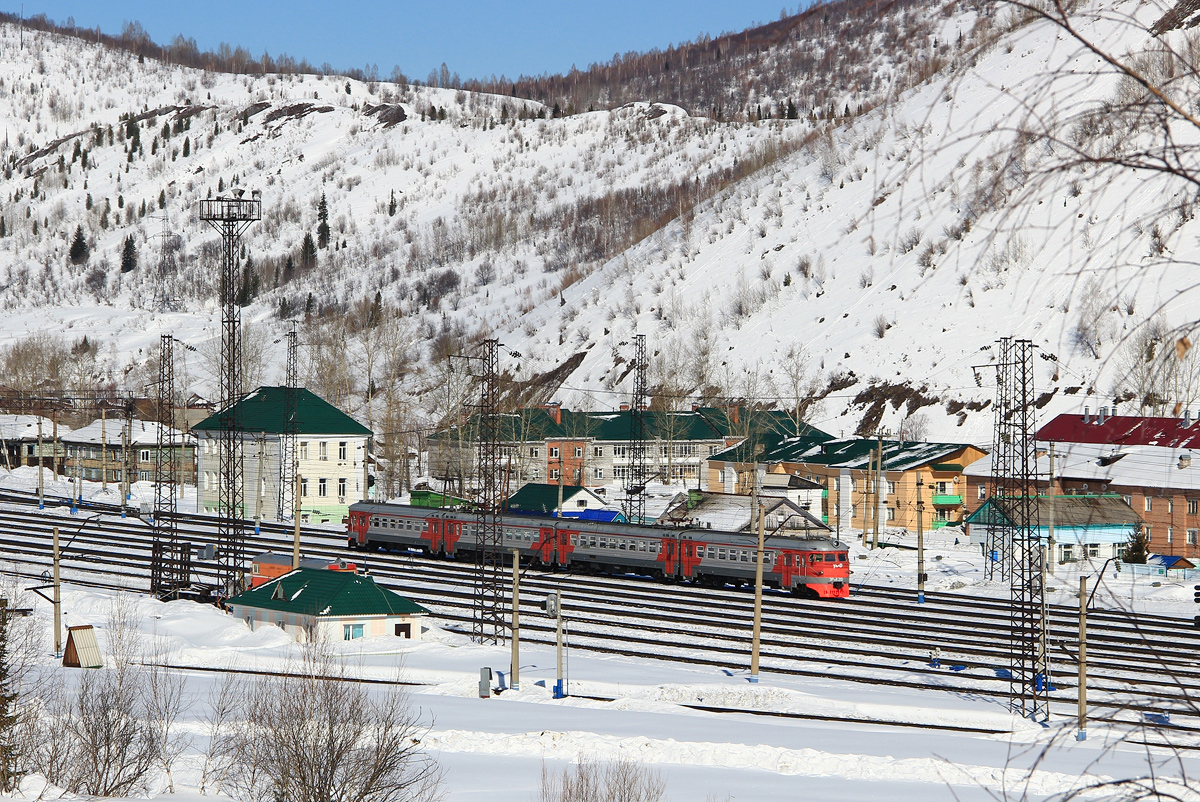
- Interactive map of Biskamzha
- Location of Biskamzha Biskamzha (Khakassia)
- Coordinates: 53°27′28″N 89°31′10″E
- Country: Russia
- Federal subject: Khakassia
- Administrative district: Askizsky District
- Elevation: 599 m (1,965 ft)

Population (2010 Census)
  - Total: 1,267
  - Estimate (2025): 1,127 (−11%)

Municipal status
  - Municipal district: Askizsky Municipal District
  - Urban settlement: Biskamzhinsky Possovet Urban Settlement
  - Capital of: Biskamzhinsky Possovet Urban Settlement
- Time zone: UTC+7 (MSK+4)
- Postal code: 655730
- OKTMO ID: 95608165051

Biskamzha (Russian: Бискамжа; Khakas: Пис Хамҷы, Pis Xamcı) is an urban-type settlement in Askizsky District of the Republic of Khakassia, Russia. Population: 1,267 (2010 census); 1,990 (2002 census); 1,876 (1989 Soviet census)..

Biskamzha railway station is on the route from Abakan to Novokuznetsk. Two local trains to Abakan and Mezhdurechensk depart from here. Also, the night sleeper train Abakan - Barnaul passes through this station.
