= Tatyana Zakharenkova =

Russian politician

Tatyana Jakovlevna Zakharenkova (Russian: Татьяна Яковлевна Захаренкова; born 14 May 1958 in Bograd, former Soviet Republic of Khakassia) is a Russian politician and Member of the Legislative Assembly of Saint Petersburg (parliamentary group "United Russia").

After she studied Spanish and English at the Faculty of Foreign Languages of the State Pedagogical Institute in Leningrad she worked for several years as principal administrator at the State administration for cinema management in Leningrad (LENGORISPOLKOM). She also worked as an interpreter until 1990. Then from 1990 to 1999 she worked in senior positions in the tourism sector in St. Petersburg.

She began her political career in 1999 as the head of office of the St. Petersburg deputy S.A. Andenko. In the local elections in 2000 she ran for the first time for a political mandate and became member of the municipal council of "Svetlanovskoe", which she chaired from 2005 on. Since 2009 she has been the chairwoman of the Council of the local government in the district of Vyborg.

In 2011 she successfully ran for the party "United Russia" in the elections to the Legislative Assembly of St. Petersburg. Today she is acting as the High Representative for international affairs of the Legislative Assembly of St. Petersburg.
