= Khakassian State University =

Russian University in Abakan

N. F. Katanov Khakassian State University
- Хакасский государственный университет имени Н. Ф. Катанова
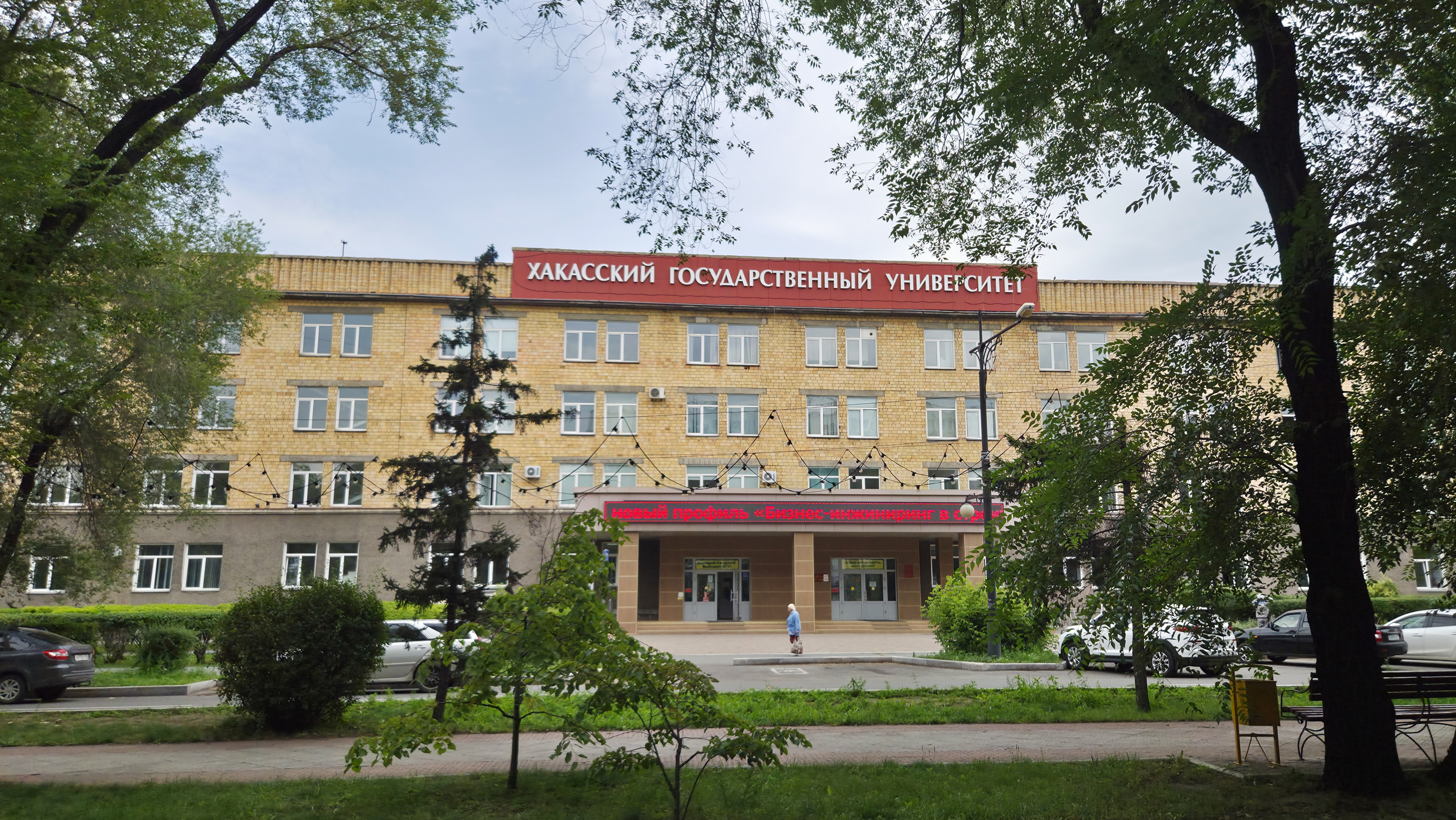
- Type: public
- Established: 1939
- Location: Abakan, Russia
- Campus: urban
- Website: www.khsu.ru
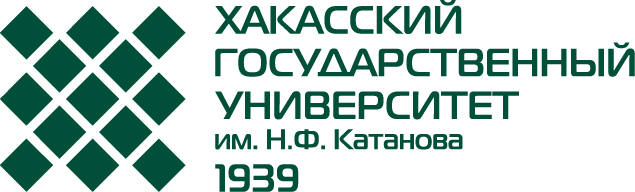

Khakassian State University named after N. F. Katanov (KhSU) (Russian: Хакасский государственный университет имени Н. Ф. Катанова) is a public university located in the city of Abakan, Russia. It is the largest higher educational institution of the Republic of Khakassia. The university cooperates with many universities in Siberia and provides training for foreign students. The main task of the university is to provide Khakassia and the south of the Krasnoyarsk Krai, as well as Tuva with highly qualified personnel.

== History ==
The university was founded on April 16, 1939, on the initiative of the People's Commissariat of Education of the RSFSR as a teacher's institute. From September 1939, 100 students began to study pedagogical sciences. Their mentors were 15 teachers. The Institute had three faculties: Russian Language and Literature; historical; physical and mathematical; education lasted only two years, the main task was to train personnel for secondary schools in Khakassia.

On February 10, 1944, the Abakan State Pedagogical Institute was opened on the basis of the teacher's institute. After 5 years of study, graduates became certified specialists.

On June 19, 1994, the institution was transformed into a state university.

Nowadays, there are 9 institutes in the structure of the university, where there are 30 bachelor's and 13 master's programs.

== Literature ==
- Большой энциклопедический словарь Красноярского края [Great Encyclopedic Dictionary of the Krasnoyarsk Krai] / гл. ред. А. П. Статейнов. Красноярск : Буква С, 2010. Т. 2 : [Административно-территориальное деление. Населенные пункты. Предприятия и организации]. pp. 473–474. 515 p. (in Russian).
