= Chernogorsk =

Town in the Republic of Khakassia, Russia

Chernogorsk Черногорск
- Town

Other transcription(s)
  - Khakas: Харатас
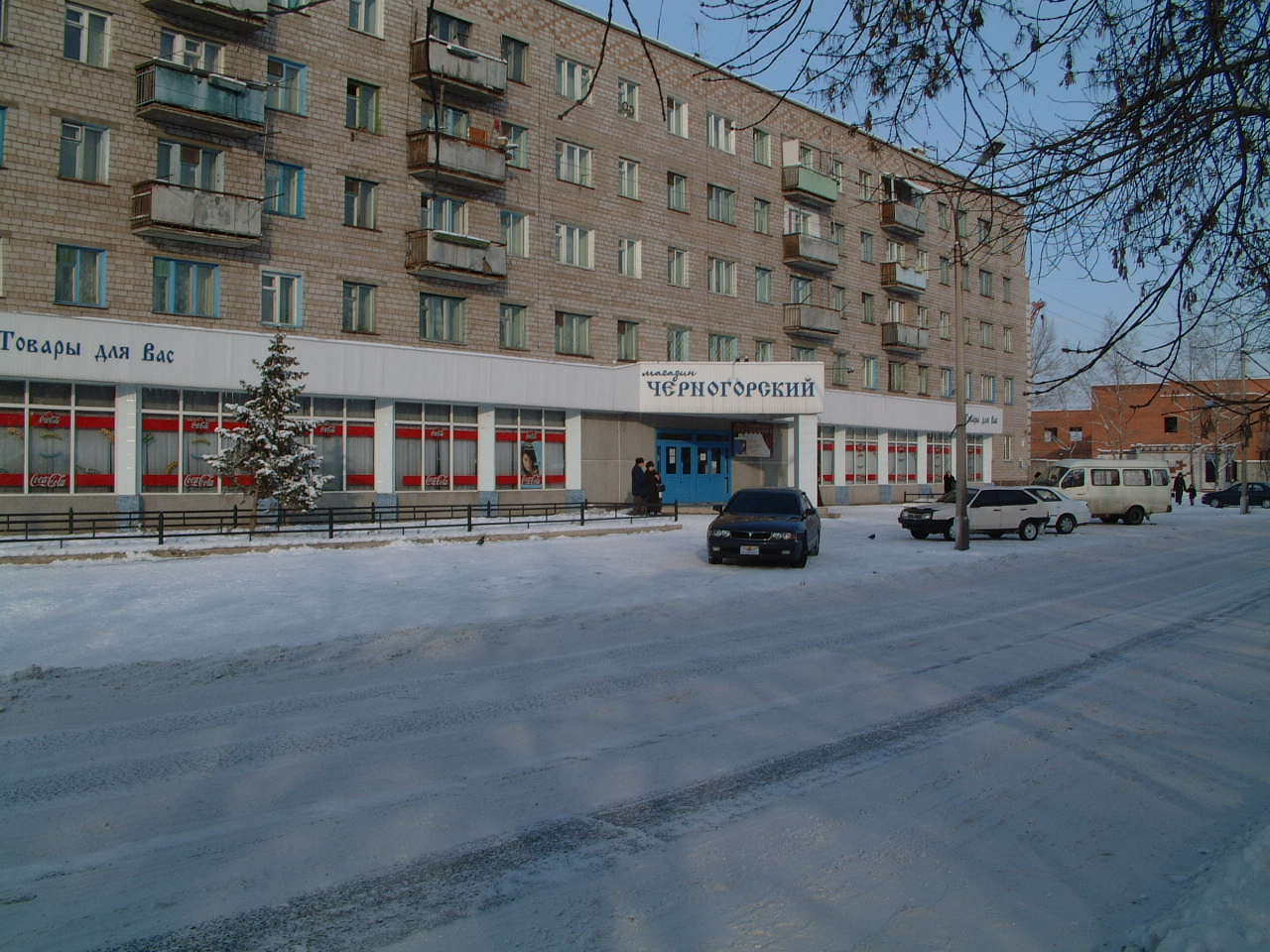
- Chernogorsk

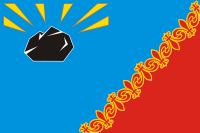
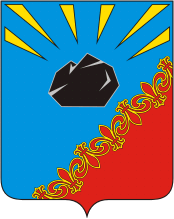
- Flag Coat of arms
- Interactive map of Chernogorsk
- Location of Chernogorsk Chernogorsk (Khakassia)
- Coordinates: 53°49′N 91°18′E
- Country: Russia
- Federal subject: Khakassia
- Founded: 1936
- Town status since: 1936
- Elevation: 260 m (850 ft)

Population (2010 Census)
  - Total: 72,147
  - Estimate (2025): 75,672 (+4.9%)
  - Rank: 219th in 2010

Administrative status
  - Subordinated to: Town of Chernogorsk
  - Capital of: Town of Chernogorsk

Municipal status
  - Urban okrug: Chernogorsk Urban Okrug
  - Capital of: Chernogorsk Urban Okrug
- Time zone: UTC+7 (MSK+4)
- Postal codes: 655151–655154, 651158, 651160, 651162, 651163
- Dialing code: +7 39031
- OKTMO ID: 95715000001
- Website: chernogorsk.com

Chernogorsk (Russian: Черного́рск; Khakas: Харатас, Xaratas) is a town in the Republic of Khakassia, Russia. Population: 72,147 (2010 census); 73,077 (2002 census); 79,355 (1989 Soviet census).

== History ==
During the Soviet era, a "corrective labor camp" was located here.

== Administrative and municipal status ==
Within the framework of administrative divisions, it is, together with the work settlement of Prigorsk, incorporated as the Town of Chernogorsk—an administrative unit with the status equal to that of the districts. As a municipal division, the Town of Chernogorsk is incorporated as Chernogorsk Urban Okrug.
