= Ust-Abakansky District =

Ust-Abakansky District Усть-Абаканский район (Russian)
- District

Other transcription(s)
  - Khakas: Ағбан пилтiрi аймағы
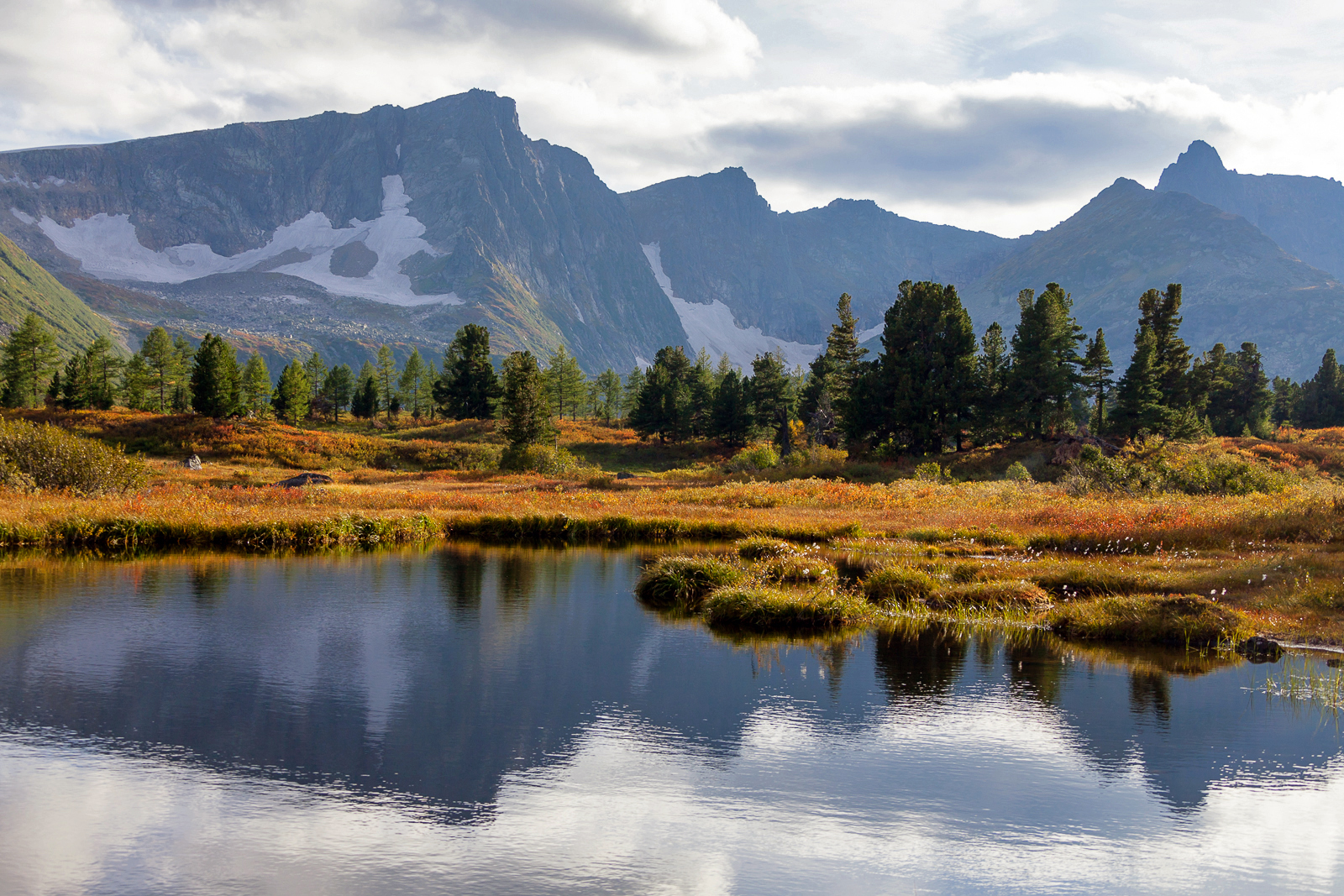
- Golden Valley Nature Reserve, Ust-Abakansky District

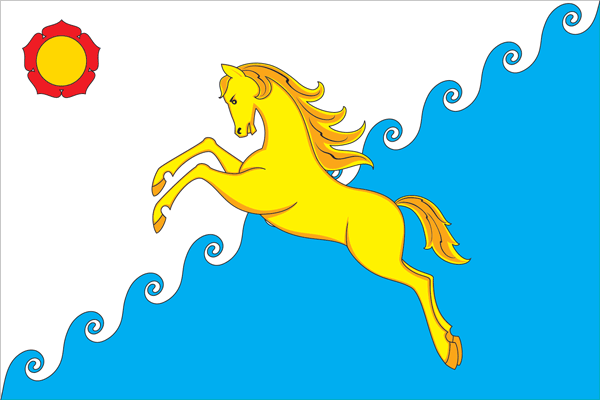
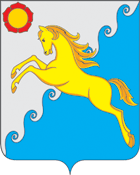
- Flag Coat of arms
- Location of Ust-Abakansky District in the Republic of Khakassia
- Coordinates: 53.822°N 89.219°E
- Country: Russia
- Federal subject: Republic of Khakassia
- Established: 1924
- Administrative center: Ust-Abakan

Area
  - Total: 8,880 km^{2} (3,430 sq mi)

Population (2010 Census)
  - Total: 39,397
  - Density: 4.44/km^{2} (11.5/sq mi)
  - Urban: 37.0%
  - Rural: 63.0%

Administrative structure
  - Administrative divisions: 1 Urban-type settlements (settlement councils), 12 Selsoviets
  - Inhabited localities: 1 urban-type settlements, 38 rural localities

Municipal structure
  - Municipally incorporated as: Ust-Abakansky Municipal District
  - Municipal divisions: 1 urban settlements, 12 rural settlements
- Time zone: UTC+7 (MSK+4)
- OKTMO ID: 95630000
- Website: http://ust-abakan.net/

Ust-Abakansky District (Russian: Усть-Абака́нский райо́н; Khakas: Ағбан пилтiрi аймағы, romanized: Ağban piltĕrĕ aymağı) is an administrative and municipal district (raion), one of the eight in the Republic of Khakassia, Russia. It is located in the center of the republic. The area of the district is 8,880 square kilometers (3,430 sq mi). Its administrative center is the urban locality (an urban-type settlement) of Ust-Abakan. Population: 39,397 (2010 census); 52,694 (2002 census); 56,733 (1989 Soviet census). The population of Ust-Abakan accounts for 37.0% of the district's total population.

== History ==
The town of Sorsk used to be administratively under the jurisdiction of the district, but was elevated in status to the town of the republican significance in 2003.
