= Béya =

- Location in Central African Republic
- Coordinates: 3°20′1″N 16°11′18″E
- Country: Central African Republic
- Prefecture: Sangha-Mbaéré
- Sub-prefecture: Nola
- Commune: Salo

Population (2016 estimate)
  - Total: 820

Béya is a village situated in Sangha-Mbaéré Prefecture, Central African Republic.

== Etymology ==
The name Beya derives from Gbaya words, which means "Pale Grass."

== History ==
Before February 2013, Fulani used to make up most of the village's demographics. However, they all left the village for Cameroon between February and March 2013 due to the war. In May 2016, the village had no Fulani left.

== Economy ==
There is a small market in the village. Due to its location in the intersection, Béya becomes the transfer point of bushmeat to other places.

== Education ==
Béya has one school.

== Healthcare ==
There is a health post in the village.
