= Prigorsk =

Prigorsk Пригорск
- Work settlement
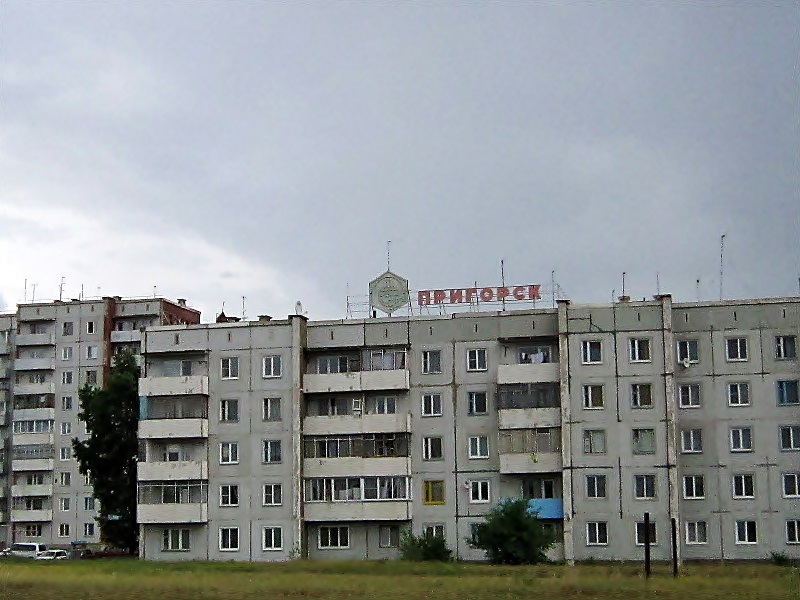
- Interactive map of Prigorsk
- Location of Prigorsk Prigorsk (Khakassia)
- Coordinates: 53°54′10″N 91°15′49″E
- Country: Russia
- Federal subject: Khakassia
- Founded: 1986

Population (2010 Census)
  - Total: 2,626
  - Estimate (2021): 2,366 (−9.9%)

Administrative status
  - Subordinated to: town of republican significance of Chernogorsk

Municipal status
  - Urban okrug: Chernogorsky Urban Okrug
- Time zone: UTC+7 (MSK+4)
- Postal code: 655156
- OKTMO ID: 95715000056

Prigorsk (Russian: Пригорск) is an urban locality (urban-type settlement) under the administrative jurisdiction of the town of republican significance of Chernogorsk of the Republic of Khakassia, Russia. Population: 2,626 (2010 census); 3,351 (2002 census); 1,767 (1989 Soviet census).
