= Beysky District =

Beysky District Бейский район (Russian)
- District

Other transcription(s)
  - Khakas: Пии аймағы
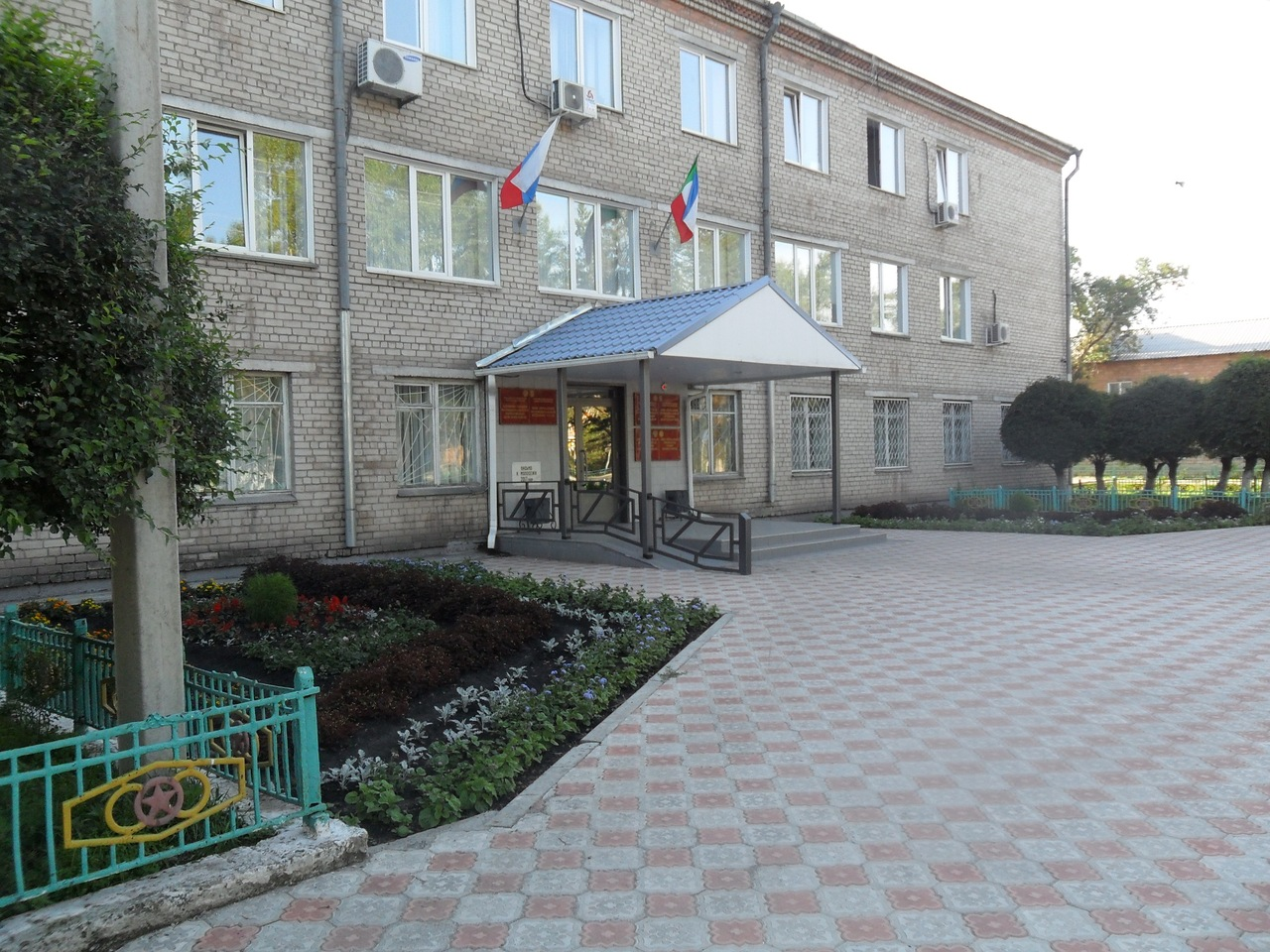
- Administration building in Beya, Beysky District

- Flag Coat of arms
- Location of Beysky District in the Republic of Khakassia
- Coordinates: 52.991°N 90.356°E
- Country: Russia
- Federal subject: Republic of Khakassia
- Established: 1924
- Administrative center: Beya

Area
  - Total: 4,536 km^{2} (1,751 sq mi)

Population (2010 Census)
  - Total: 19,305
  - Density: 4.256/km^{2} (11.02/sq mi)
  - Urban: 0%
  - Rural: 100%

Administrative structure
  - Administrative divisions: 9 selsoviet
  - Inhabited localities: 28 rural localities

Municipal structure
  - Municipally incorporated as: Beysky Municipal District
  - Municipal divisions: 0 urban settlements, 9 rural settlements
- Time zone: UTC+7 (MSK+4)
- OKTMO ID: 95612000
- Website: http://www.19beya.ru/

Beysky District (Russian: Бе́йский райо́н; Khakas: Пии аймағы, Pii aymağı) is an administrative and municipal district (raion), one of the eight in the Republic of Khakassia, Russia. It is located in the east of the republic. The area of the district is 4,536 square kilometers (1,751 sq mi). Its administrative center is the rural locality (a selo) of Beya. Population: 19,305 (2010 census); 21,100 (2002 census); 21,418 (1989 Soviet census). The population of Beya accounts for 27.2% of the district's total population. Beysky district is 18,71% Khakass (2010)
