= Abaza (town) =

Town in the Republic of Khakassia, Russia

Abaza Абаза
- Town

Other transcription(s)
  - Khakas: Абаза
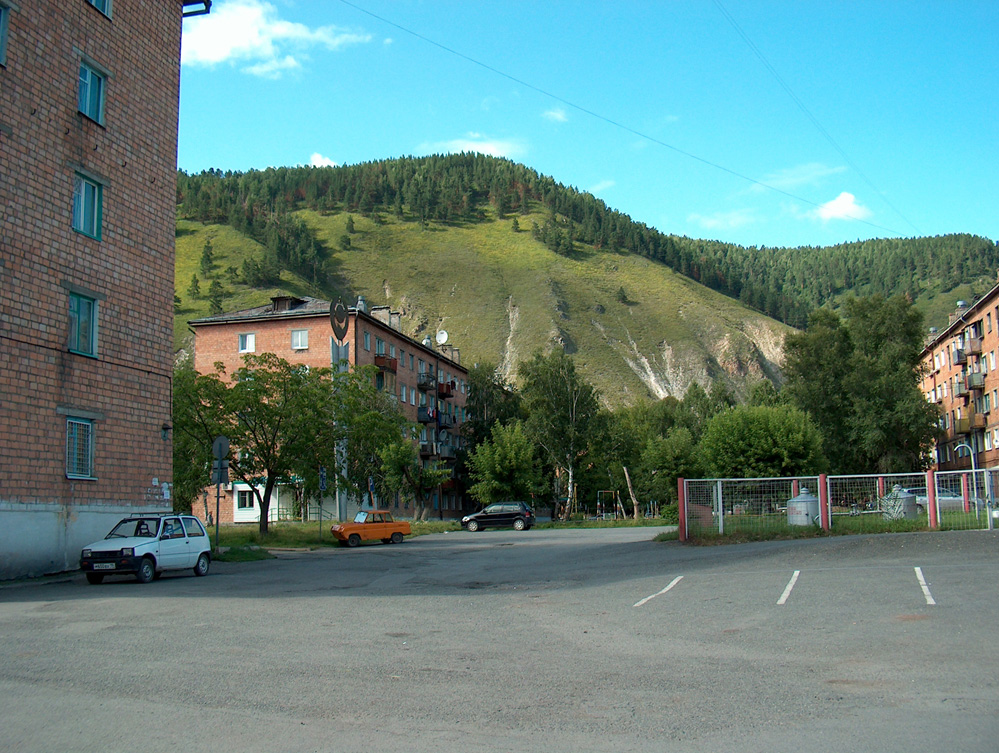
- Abaza

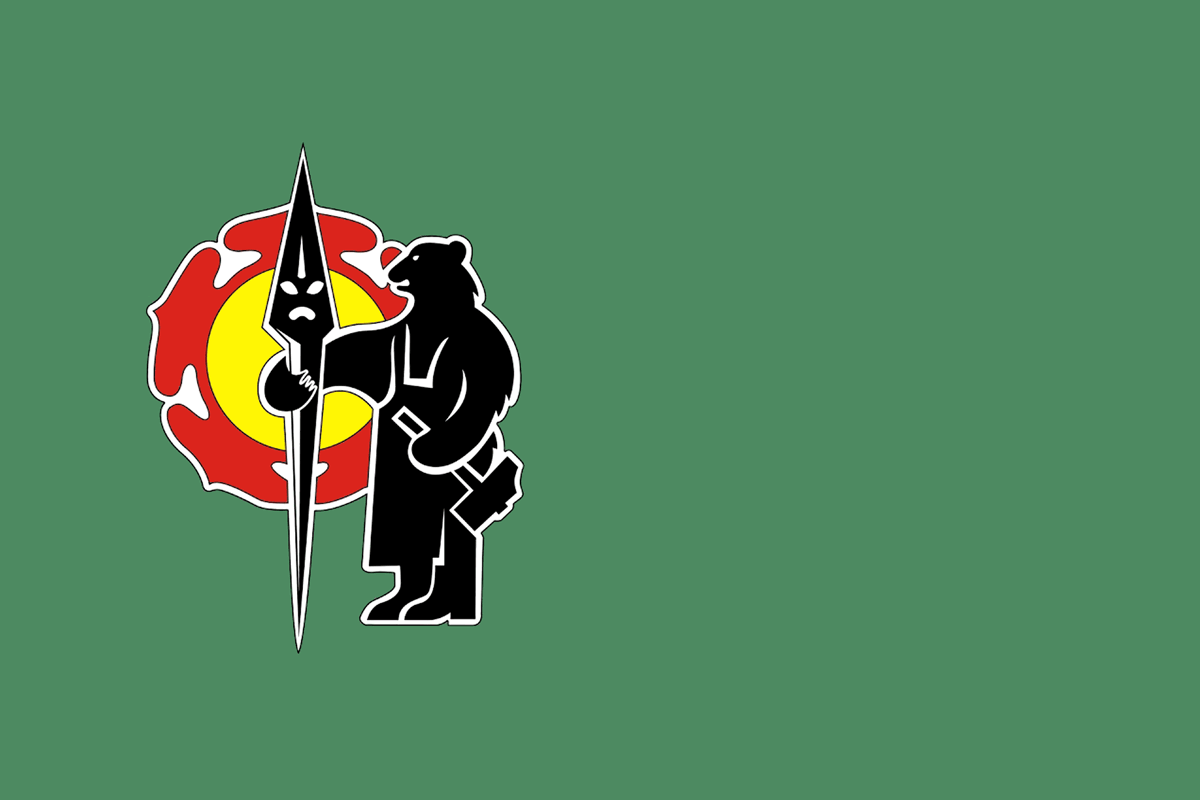
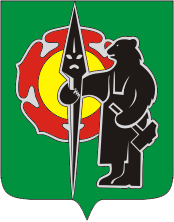
- Flag Coat of arms
- Interactive map of Abaza
- Location of Abaza Abaza (Khakassia)
- Coordinates: 52°38′53″N 90°04′26″E
- Country: Russia
- Federal subject: Khakassia
- Settlement: 1856
- Town status since: 1966
- Elevation: 450 m (1,480 ft)

Population (2010 Census)
  - Total: 17,115
  - Estimate (2021): 12,272 (−28.3%)

Administrative status
  - Subordinated to: Town of Abaza
  - Capital of: Town of Abaza

Municipal status
  - Urban okrug: Abaza Urban Okrug
  - Capital of: Abaza Urban Okrug
- Time zone: UTC+7 (MSK+4)
- Postal code: 655750
- OKTMO ID: 95702000001
- Website: www.abaza-adm.ru

Abaza (Russian and Khakas: Абаза, Abaza) is a town in the Republic of Khakassia, Russia, located on the Abakan River 144 kilometers (89 mi) south of Abakan. Population: 17,115 (2010 census); 18,052 (2002 census); 17,630 (1989 Soviet census).

== History ==
It was founded in 1856 and developed on the strength of iron ore deposits; the extraction industry is still important to the local economy. The metallurgical plant was in operation until 1926. The settlement serving the plant was known as Abaza, an abbreviation of Abakan and Zavod (plant). The extraction work of iron ore is carried out at a mine 5 km from the city. Iron ore is sent to Novokuznetsk metallurgical enterprises. Abaza was granted urban-type settlement status in 1957 and town status in 1966.

Since 1995, the Abakan mining group has been operating as a division of the OJSC "West-Siberian metallurgical plant».

It was included in the list of single-industry cities of the Russian Federation by order No1398-r of the Government "On approval of the list of single-industry towns" dated July 7, 2014.

== Administrative and municipal status ==
Within the framework of administrative divisions, it is incorporated as the Town of Abaza—an administrative unit with the status equal to that of the districts. As a municipal division, the Town of Abaza is incorporated as Abaza Urban Okrug.

== Sport ==
Some bandy is played in Abaza.
