= Ketovo, Kurgan Oblast =

Rural locality in Kurgan Oblast, Russia

Coordinates: 55°20′35″N 65°19′58″E

Ketovo (Russian: Кетово) is a rural locality (a selo) and the administrative center of Ketovsky District, Kurgan Oblast, Russia. Population: 7,251 (2010 census); 7,127 (2002 census); 6,377 (1989 Soviet census).
