= Zhemchuzhny =

Zhemchuzhny Жемчужный
- Settlement
- Location within Perm Krai Location within Russia
- Coordinates: 60°34′N 53°56′E
- Country: Russia
- Region: Perm Krai
- District: Gaynsky District
- Time zone: UTC+5:00

Zhemchuzhny (Russian: Жемчужный; Komi-Permyak: Нӧрыс, Nörys) is a rural locality (a settlement) in Kebratskoye Rural Settlement, Gaynsky District, Perm Krai, Russia. The population was 240 as of 2010. There are 9 streets.

== Geography ==
Zhemchuzhny is located 96 km northwest of Gayny (the district's administrative centre) by road. Verkhny Budym is the nearest rural locality.
