= Kuragino =

Kuragno (Russian: Курагино) is the name of several inhabited localities in Russia.

Urban localities

- Kuragino, Krasnoyarsk Krai, a work settlement in Kuraginsky District of Krasnoyarsk Krai

Rural localities

- Kuragino, Tula Oblast, a village in Solopensky Rural Okrug of Aleksinsky District of Tula Oblast
