= Abakan (river) =

River in Russia

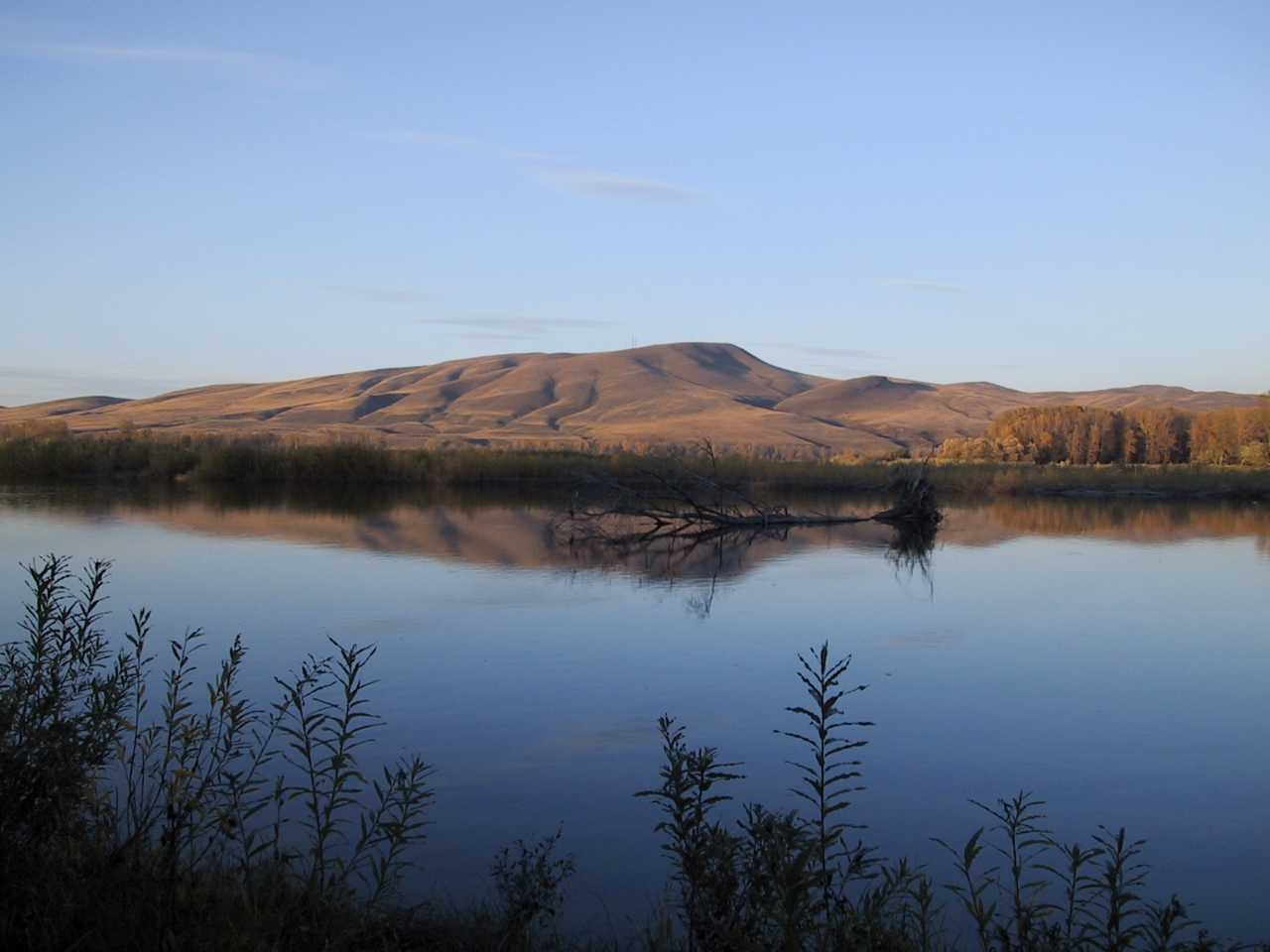
- The Abakan River

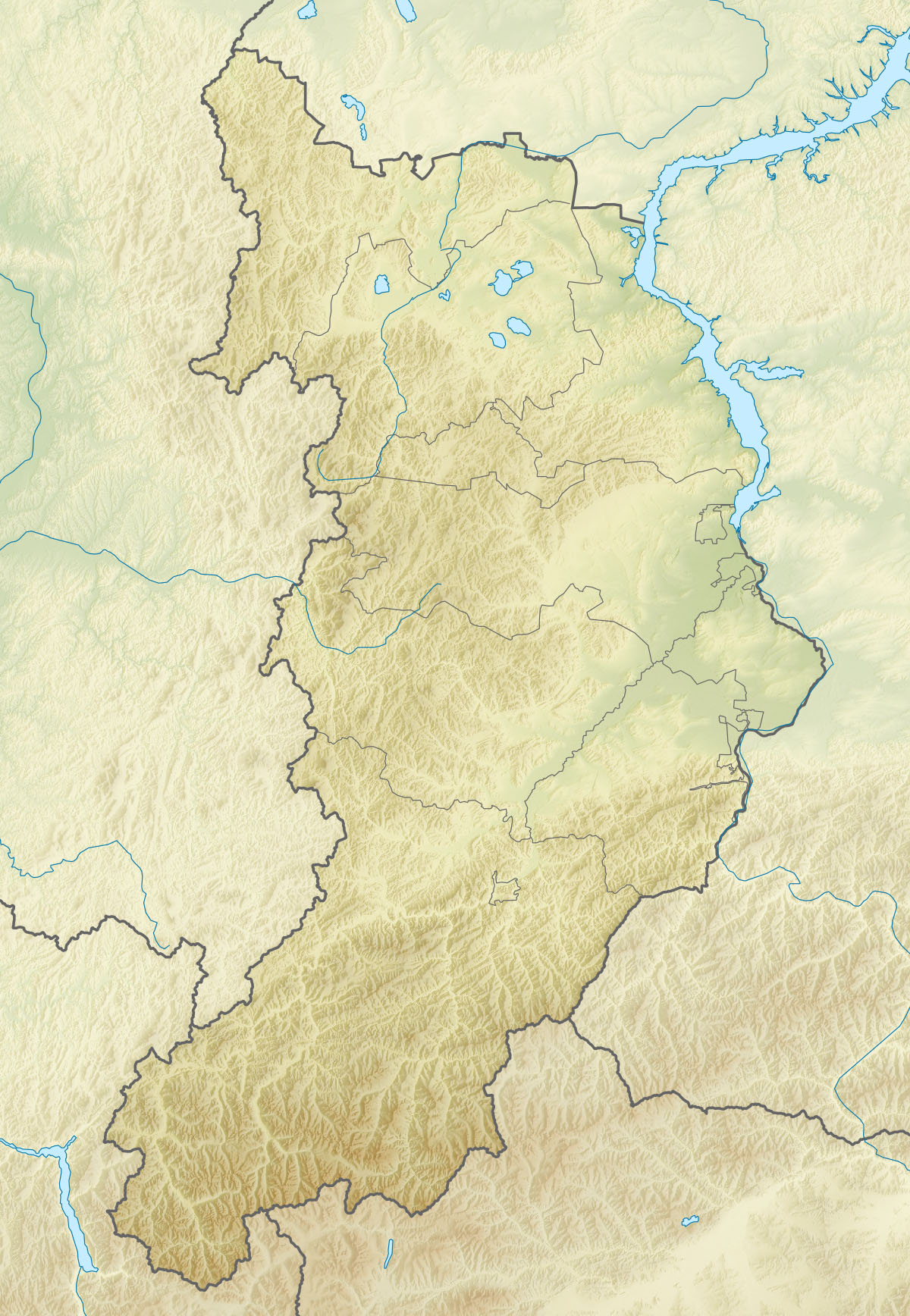
- Mouth location
- Native name: Абака́н (Russian)

Location
- Country: Russia
- State: Republic of Khakassia
- Cities: Abaza, Abakan

Physical characteristics
- Source: Bolshoy Abakan
- 2nd source: Maly Abakan
- Mouth: Yenisey
  - location: Abakan
  - coordinates: 53°43′50″N 91°30′31″E
- Length: 327 km (203 mi)
- Basin size: 32,000 km^{2} (12,000 sq mi)

Basin features
- Progression: Yenisey→ Kara Sea

The Abakan (Russian: Абака́н; Khakas: Ағбан, Ağban; from the Khakas word for 'bear's blood') is a river in the Republic of Khakassia, Russia. It is a left tributary of the Yenisey. The river is used for log driving and irrigation. The city of Abakan is located at the confluence of the Abakan and the Yenisey.

== Course ==
It is formed by the confluence of the rivers Bolshoy Abakan and Maly Abakan. It rises in the western Sayan Mountains and flows northeast through the Minusinsk Depression to the Yenisey. It is about 514 kilometres (319 mi) long from the Bolshoy Abakan's source, and 327 kilometres (203 mi) for the Abakan proper. Its drainage basin covers 32,000 square kilometres (12,000 sq mi).

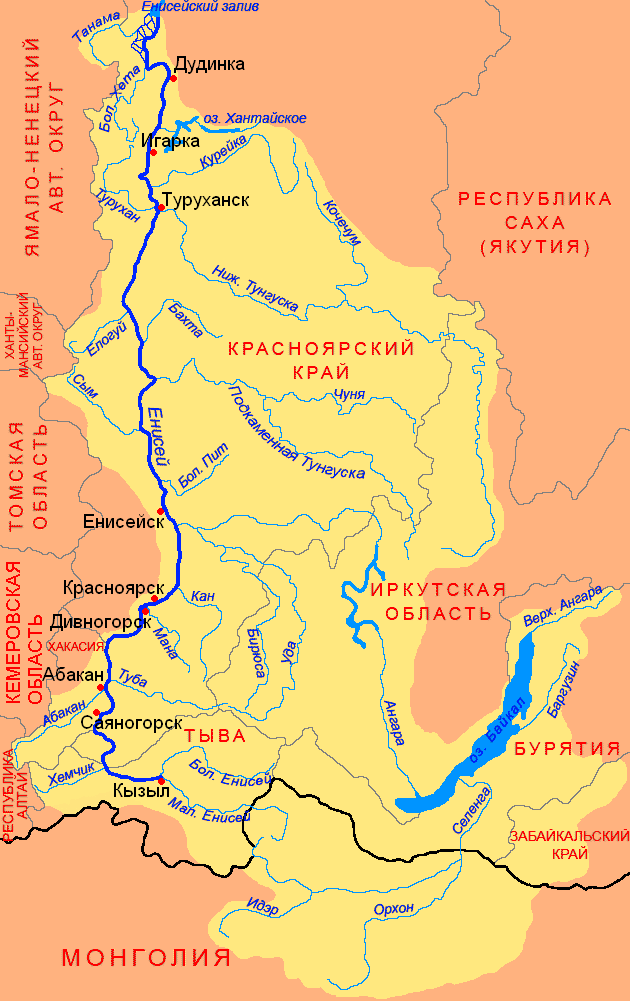
Basin of the Yenisey

== Tributaries ==
Major tributaries of the Abakan include the Uybat (162 km), Ona (157 km), Tashtyp (136 km), Askiz (124 km), Maly Abakan (117 km), Dzhebash (84 km), and Beya (71 km).

== See also ==
- List of rivers of Russia
- Abakan Range
- Geography of South-Central Siberia
