= Bely Yar, Amur Oblast =

Bely Yar Белый Яр
- Selo
- Location within Amur Oblast Location within Russia
- Coordinates: 50°11′N 129°11′E
- Country: Russia
- Region: Amur Oblast
- District: Zavitinsky District
- Time zone: UTC+9:00

Bely Yar (Russian: Белый Яр) is a selo in Beloyarovsky Selsoviet of Zavitinsky District, Amur Oblast, Russia. The population was 165 as of 2018. There are ten streets.

== Geography ==
Bely Yar is located on the left bank of the Zavitaya River, 26 km northwest of Zavitinsk (the district's administrative centre) by road. Novomikhaylovka is the nearest rural locality.
