= Ust-Abakan =

Ust-Abakan Усть-Абакан
- Urban-type settlement
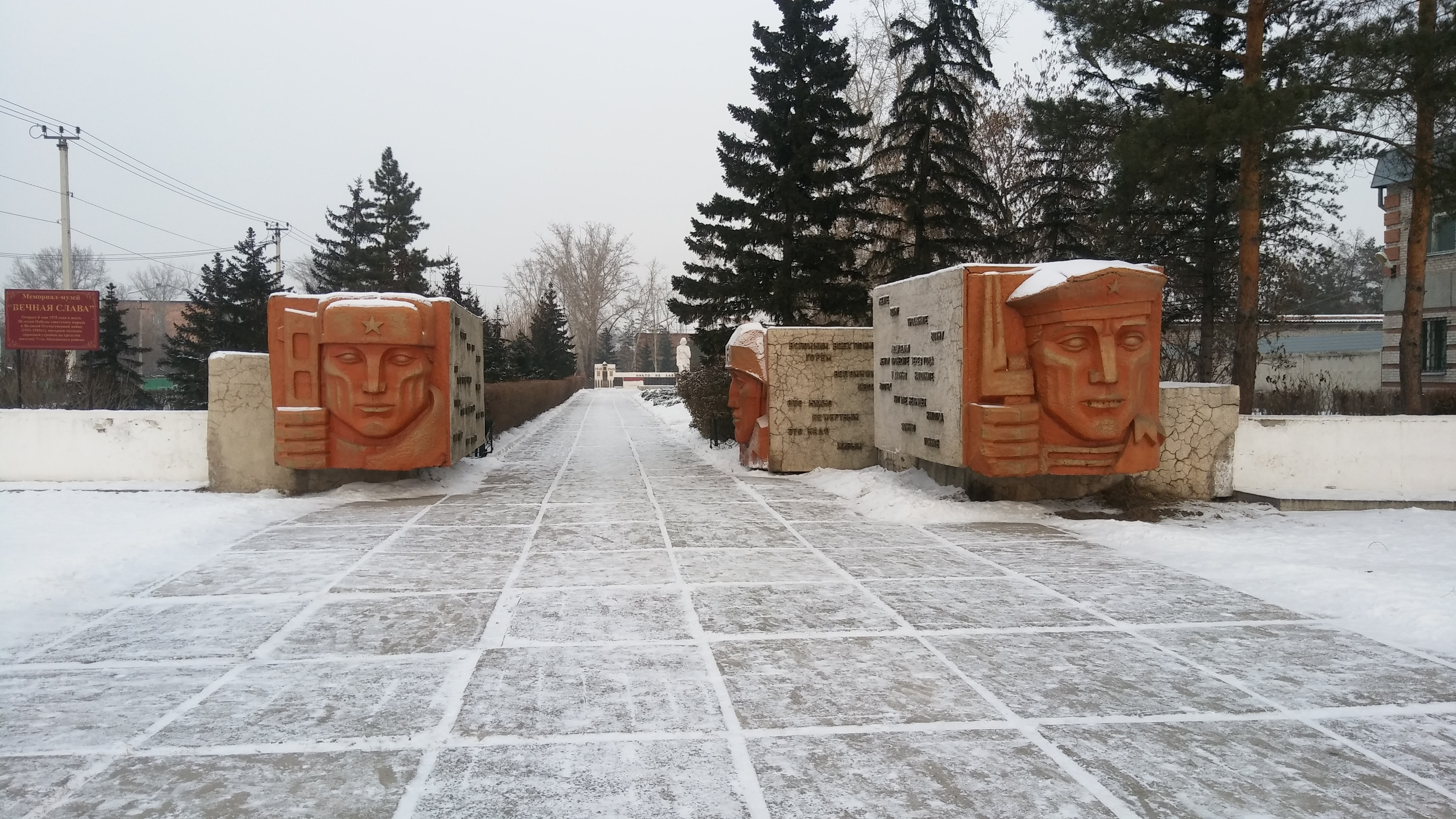
- Eternal Glory Memorial
- Interactive map of Ust-Abakan
- Location of Ust-Abakan Ust-Abakan (Khakassia)
- Coordinates: 53°50′11″N 91°23′33″E
- Country: Russia
- Federal subject: Khakassia
- Administrative district: Ust-Abakansky District
- Founded: 1909

Population (2010 Census)
  - Total: 14,578
  - Estimate (2025): 13,465 (−7.6%)

Administrative status
  - Capital of: Ust-Abakansky District

Municipal status
  - Municipal district: Ust-Abakansky Municipal District
  - Urban settlement: Ust-Abakansky Possovet Urban Settlement
  - Capital of: Ust-Abakansky Municipal District, Ust-Abakansky Possovet Urban Settlement
- Time zone: UTC+7 (MSK+4)
- Postal code: 655100
- OKTMO ID: 95630151051

Ust-Abakan (Russian: Усть-Абакан, romanized: Ust'-Abakan; Khakas: Ағбан пилтiрi, Ağban piltërë) is an urban-type settlement and the administrative center of Ust-Abakansky District of the Republic of Khakassia, Russia. Population: 14,578 (2010 census); 14,913 (2002 census); 15,831 (1989 Soviet census).
