= Beya (rural locality) =

Rural locality in Khakassia, Russia

Coordinates: 53°02′51″N 90°55′54″E

Beya (Russian: Бея; Khakas: Пии, Pii) is a rural locality (a selo) and the administrative center of Beysky District of the Republic of Khakassia, Russia. Population: 5,247 (2010 census); 5,417 (2002 census); 5,698 (1989 Soviet census).
