= Bogradsky District =

Bogradsky District Боградский район (Russian)
- District

Other transcription(s)
  - Khakas: Боград аймағы
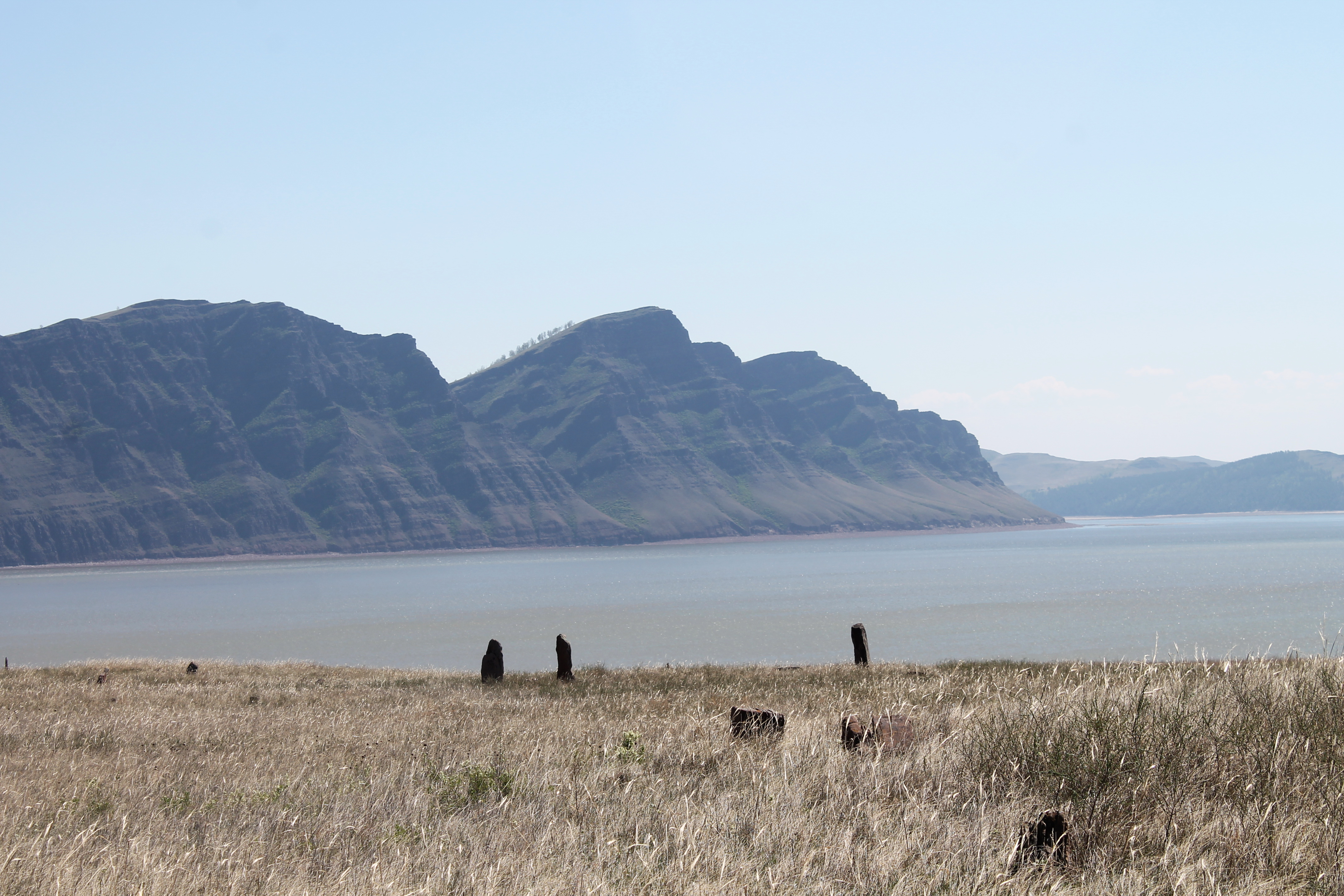
- Oglahtinskaya fortress, Bogradsky District

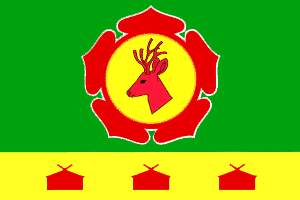
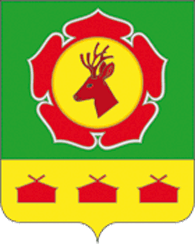
- Flag Coat of arms
- Location of Bogradsky District in the Republic of Khakassia
- Coordinates: 54.445°N 90.319°E
- Country: Russia
- Federal subject: Republic of Khakassia
- Established: 1925
- Administrative center: Bograd

Area
  - Total: 4,524 km^{2} (1,747 sq mi)

Population (2010 Census)
  - Total: 15,869
  - Density: 3.508/km^{2} (9.085/sq mi)
  - Urban: 0%
  - Rural: 100%

Administrative structure
  - Administrative divisions: 10 selsoviet
  - Inhabited localities: 28 rural localities

Municipal structure
  - Municipally incorporated as: Bogradsky Municipal District
  - Municipal divisions: 0 urban settlements, 10 rural settlements
- Time zone: UTC+7 (MSK+4)
- OKTMO ID: 95615000
- Website: http://bograd-web.ru/

Bogradsky District (Russian: Богра́дский райо́н; Khakas: Боград аймағы, Bograd aymağı) is an administrative and municipal district (raion), one of the eight in the Republic of Khakassia, Russia. It is located in the northeast of the republic. The area of the district is 4,524 square kilometers (1,747 sq mi). Its administrative center is the rural locality (a selo) of Bograd. Population: 15,869 (2010 census); 16,286 (2002 census); 19,801 (1989 Soviet census). The population of Bograd accounts for 29.4% of the district's total population.
