= Bely Yar, Republic of Khakassia =

Rural locality in the Republic of Khakassia, Russia

Bely Yar Белый Яр
- Selo

Other transcription(s)
  - Khakas: Хуба Чар
- Interactive map of Bely Yar
- Location of Bely Yar Bely Yar (Khakassia)
- Coordinates: 53°35′53″N 91°22′56″E
- Country: Russia
- Federal subject: Khakassia
- Administrative district: Altaysky District
- SelsovietSelsoviet: Beloyarsky Selsoviet
- Founded: 1848
- Elevation: 258 m (846 ft)

Population (2010 Census)
  - Total: 10,014
  - Estimate (2021): 10,107 (+0.9%)

Administrative status
  - Capital of: Altaysky District, Beloyarsky Selsoviet

Municipal status
  - Municipal district: Altaysky Municipal District
  - Rural settlement: Beloyarsky Selsoviet Rural Settlement
  - Capital of: Altaysky Municipal District, Beloyarsky Selsoviet Rural Settlement
- Time zone: UTC+7 (MSK+4)
- Postal code: 655650
- OKTMO ID: 95605410101

Bely Yar (Russian: Белый Яр; Khakas: Хуба Чар, Xuba Çar) is a rural locality (a selo) and the administrative center of Altaysky District of the Republic of Khakassia, Russia. Population: 10,014 (2010 census); 9,083 (2002 census); 7,721 (1989 Soviet census).
