= Bograd =

Rural locality in Khakassia, Russia

Coordinates: 54°13′18″N 90°51′13″E

Bograd (Russian & Khakas: Боград, Bograd) is a rural locality (a selo) and the administrative center of Bogradsky District of the Republic of Khakassia, Russia. Population: 4,670 (2010 census); 4,691 (2002 census); 5,262 (1989 Soviet census).

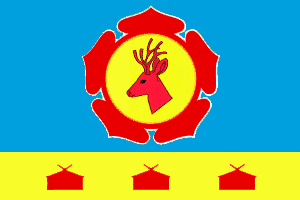
Flag of Bograd

The village was founded in 1763 and originally called Tatarskaya Tes' by the ethnic Khakas. It was later renamed in 1933 after revolutionary Yakov Bograd

== Notable people ==
- Tatyana Zakharenkova (born 1958) - politician
