= Altaysky District, Republic of Khakassia =

Altaysky District Алтайский район (Russian)
- District

Other transcription(s)
  - Khakas: Алтай аймағы
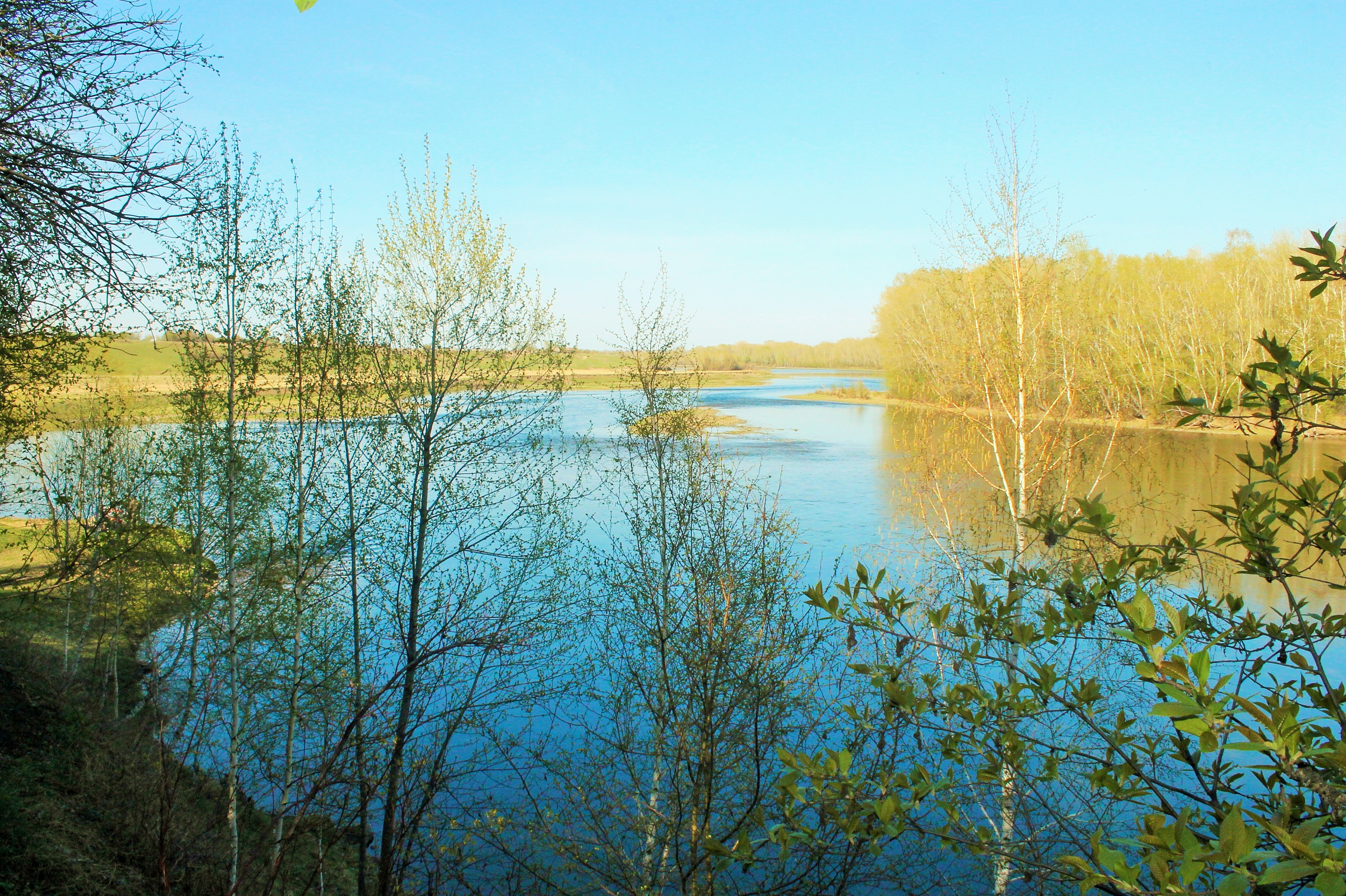
- Yenisei River, Altaysky District

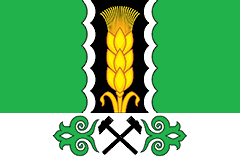
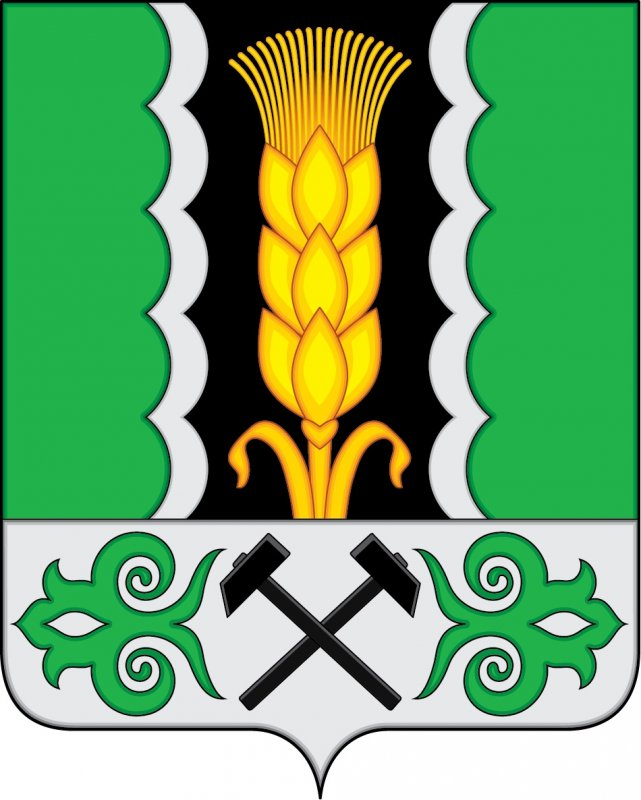
- Flag Coat of arms
- Location of Altaysky District in the Republic of Khakassia
- Coordinates: 53°36′01″N 91°23′17″E
- Country: Russia
- Federal subject: Republic of Khakassia
- Established: 1944
- Administrative center: Bely Yar

Area
  - Total: 1,736.1 km^{2} (670.3 sq mi)

Population (2010 Census)
  - Total: 25,559
  - Density: 14.722/km^{2} (38.130/sq mi)
  - Urban: 0%
  - Rural: 100%

Administrative structure
  - Administrative divisions: 9 selsoviet
  - Inhabited localities: 19 rural localities

Municipal structure
  - Municipally incorporated as: Altaysky Municipal District
  - Municipal divisions: 0 urban settlements, 9 rural settlements
- Time zone: UTC+7 (MSK+4)
- OKTMO ID: 95605000
- Website: http://www.mo-altay.ru/

Altaysky District (Russian: Алта́йский райо́н; Khakas: Алтай аймағы, Altay aymağı) is an administrative and municipal district (raion), one of the eight in the Republic of Khakassia, Russia. It is located in the east of the republic. The area of the district is 1,736.1 square kilometers (670.3 sq mi). Its administrative center is the rural locality (a selo) of Bely Yar. Population: 25,559 (2010 census); 23,894 (2002 census); 22,237 (1989 Soviet census). The population of Bely Yar accounts for 39.1% of the district's total population.
