= Ketovsky District =

Ketovsky District Кетовский район (Russian)
- District
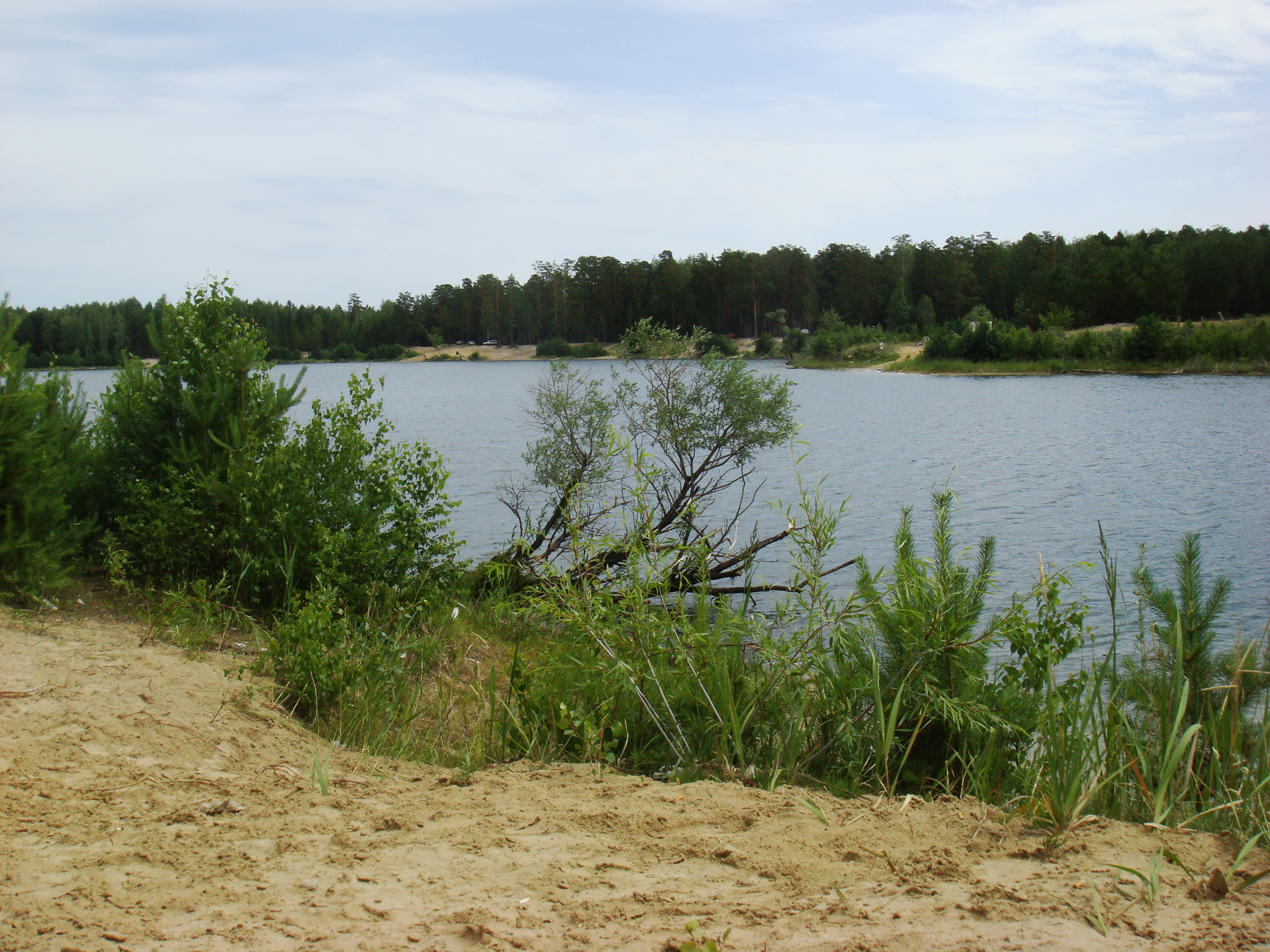
- Blue Lake, Ketovsky District

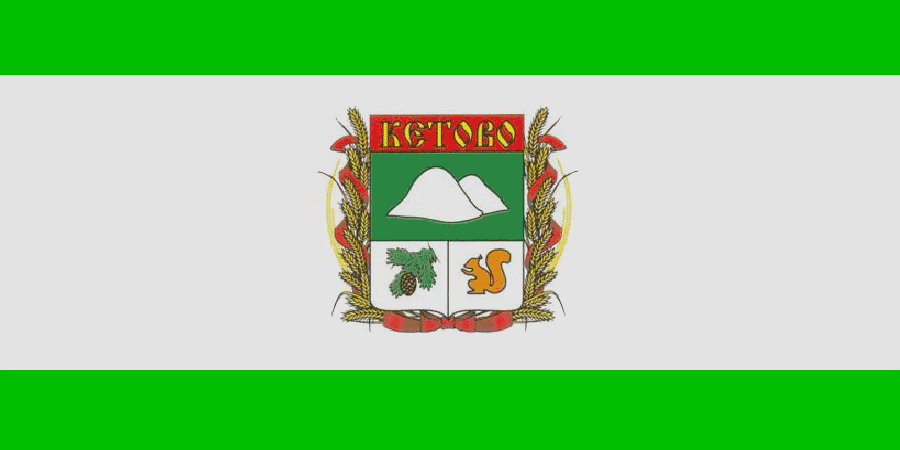
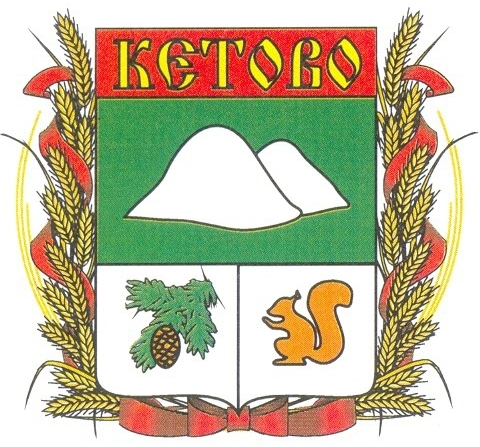
- Flag Coat of arms
- Location of Ketovsky District in Kurgan Oblast
- Coordinates: 55°21′09″N 65°19′41″E
- Country: Russia
- Federal subject: Kurgan Oblast
- Established: 3 November 1923
- Administrative center: Ketovo

Area
  - Total: 3,550 km^{2} (1,370 sq mi)

Population (2010 Census)
  - Total: 55,427
  - Density: 15.6/km^{2} (40.4/sq mi)
  - Urban: 0%
  - Rural: 100%

Administrative structure
  - Administrative divisions: 28 selsoviet
  - Inhabited localities: 76 rural localities

Municipal structure
  - Municipally incorporated as: Ketovsky Municipal District
  - Municipal divisions: 0 urban settlements, 28 rural settlements
- Time zone: UTC+5 (MSK+2)
- OKTMO ID: 37514000
- Website: http://xn-----6kcacalifm4aabujcztmncbd7ammitg9i2m.xn--p1ai/

Ketovsky District (Russian: Кетовский райо́н) is an administrative and municipal district (raion), one of the twenty-four in Kurgan Oblast, Russia. It is located in the center of the oblast. The area of the district is 3,550 square kilometers (1,370 sq mi). Its administrative center is the rural locality (a selo) of Ketovo. Population: 55,427 (2010 census); 56,488 (2002 Census); 53,248 (1989 Soviet census). The population of Ketovo accounts for 13.1% of the district's total population.
