= Askiz (urban-type settlement) =

Askiz Аскиз
- Urban-type settlement

Other transcription(s)
  - Khakas: Асхыс
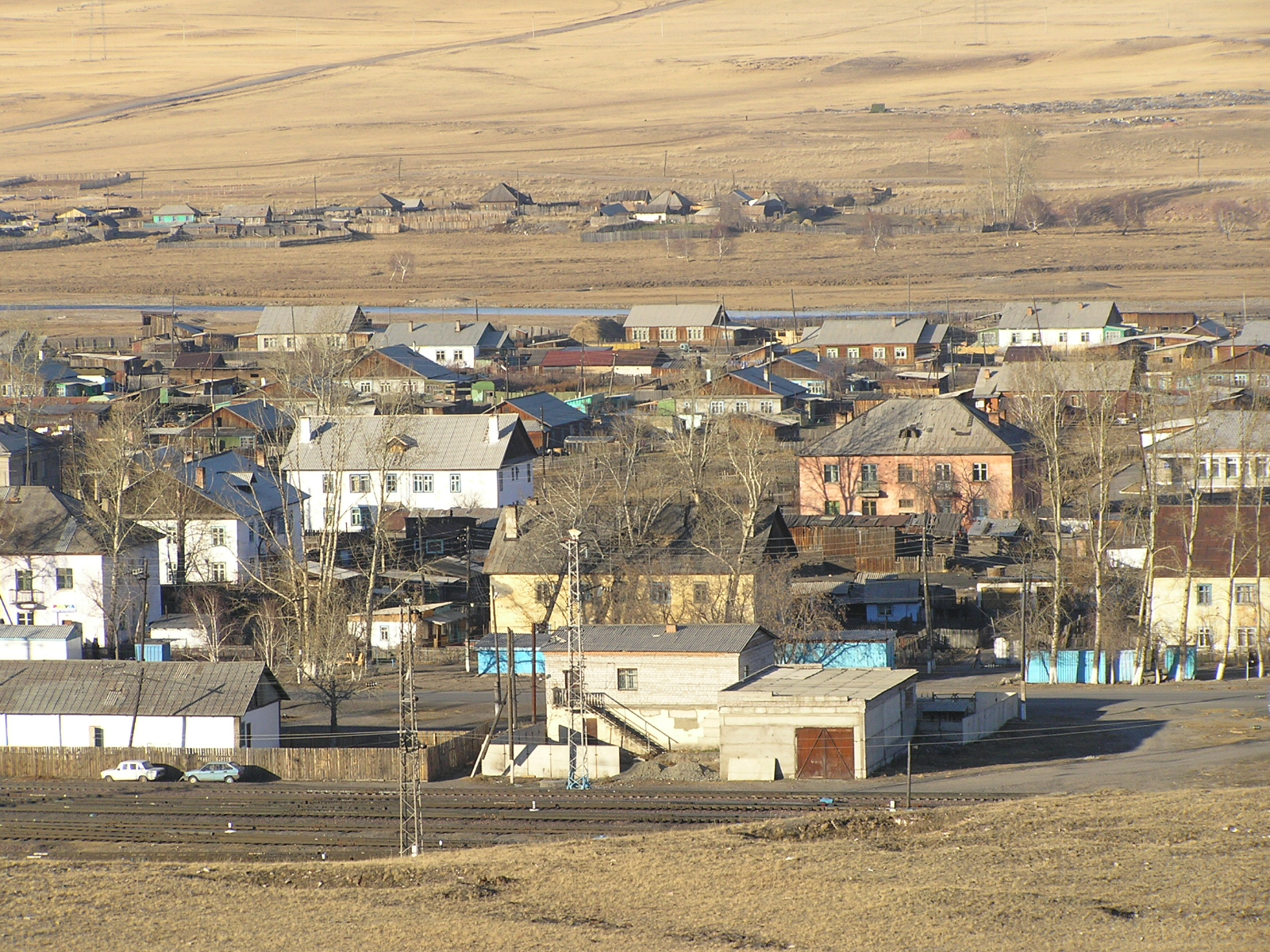
- Interactive map of Askiz
- Location of Askiz Askiz (Khakassia)
- Coordinates: 53°07′54″N 90°25′58″E
- Country: Russia
- Federal subject: Khakassia
- Administrative district: Askizsky District
- Founded: 1949
- Elevation: 366 m (1,201 ft)

Population (2010 Census)
  - Total: 5,208
  - Estimate (2025): 5,132 (−1.5%)

Municipal status
  - Municipal district: Askizsky Municipal District
  - Urban settlement: Askizsky Possovet Urban Settlement
  - Capital of: Askizsky Possovet Urban Settlement
- Time zone: UTC+7 (MSK+4)
- Postal code: 655735
- OKTMO ID: 95608151051

Askiz (Russian: Аскиз; Khakas: Асхыс, Asxıs) is an urban-type settlement in Askizsky District of the Republic of Khakassia, Russia. Population: 5,208 (2010 census); 7,030 (2002 census); 4,572 (1989 Soviet census).
