= Askiz (rural locality) =

Askiz Аскиз
- Selo

Other transcription(s)
  - Khakas: Асхыс
- Interactive map of Askiz
- Location of Askiz Askiz (Khakassia)
- Coordinates: 53°08′00″N 90°32′02″E
- Country: Russia
- Federal subject: Khakassia
- Administrative district: Askizsky District
- SelsovietSelsoviet: Askizsky Selsoviet
- Founded: 1771
- Elevation: 346 m (1,135 ft)

Population (2010 Census)
  - Total: 7,267
  - Estimate (2021): 7,722 (+6.3%)

Administrative status
  - Capital of: Askizsky District, Askizsky Selsoviet

Municipal status
  - Municipal district: Askizsky Municipal District
  - Rural settlement: Askizsky Selsoviet Rural Settlement
  - Capital of: Askizsky Municipal District, Askizsky Selsoviet Rural Settlement
- Time zone: UTC+7 (MSK+4)
- Postal code: 655700
- OKTMO ID: 95608405101

Askiz (Russian: Аскиз; Khakas: Асхыс, Asxıs) is a rural locality (a selo) and the administrative center of Askizsky District of the Republic of Khakassia, Russia. Population: 7,267 (2010 census); 7,030 (2002 census); 6,703 (1989 Soviet census).
