= Abakan =

City in the Republic of Khakassia, Russia

Abakan Абакан
- City

Other transcription(s)
  - Khakas: Ағбан
  - Khakas: Абахан
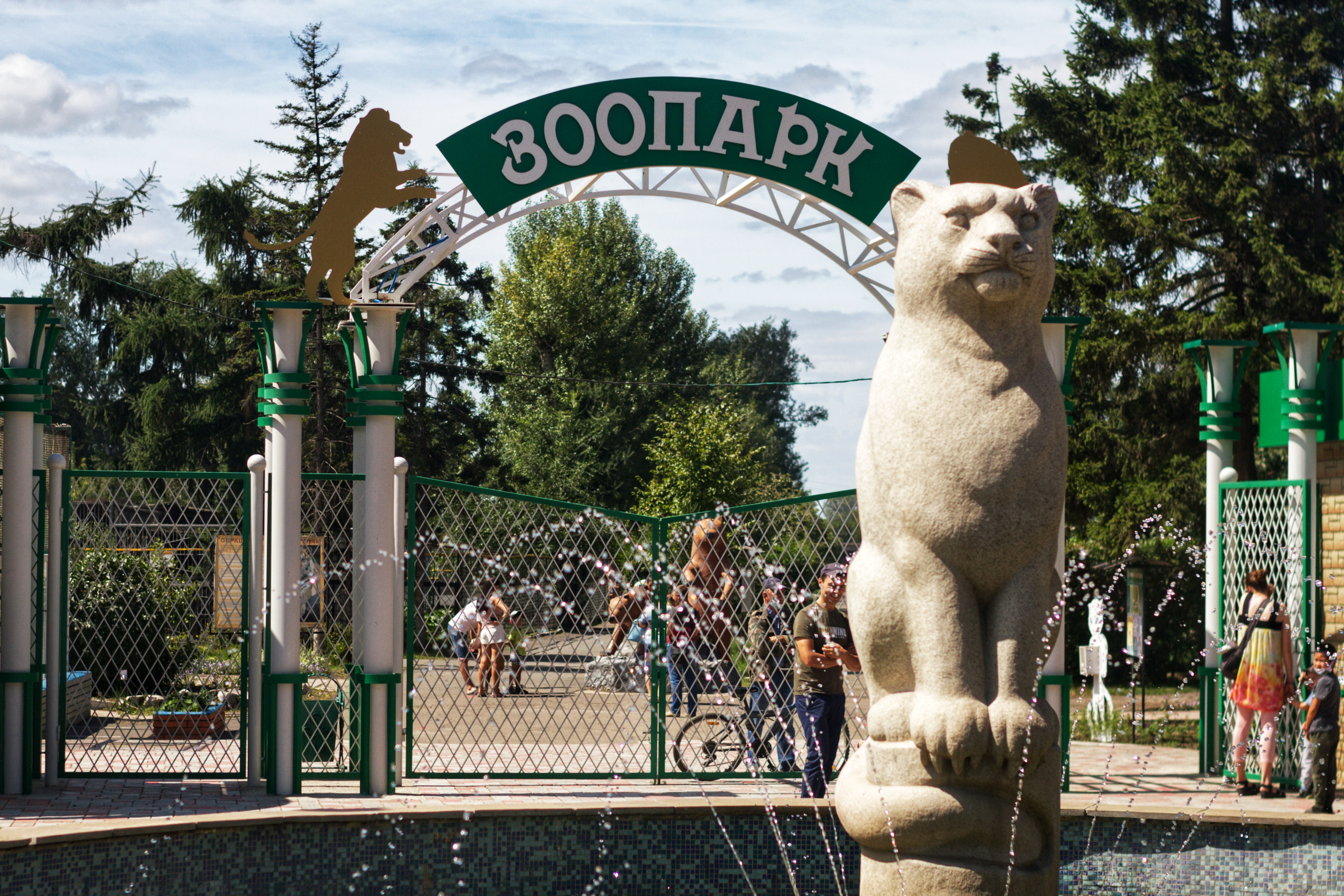
- Abakan Zoo.

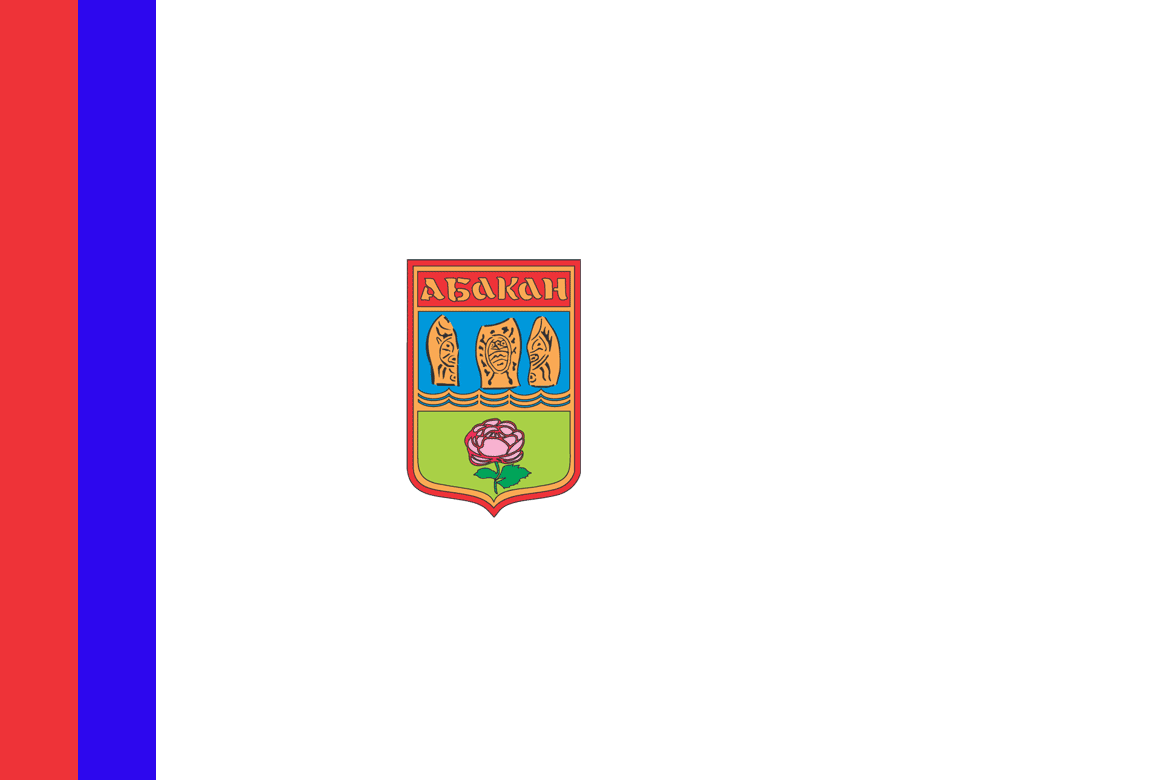
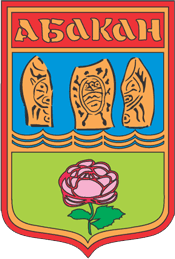
- Flag Coat of arms
- Interactive map of Abakan
- Location of Abakan Abakan (Khakassia)
- Coordinates: 53°43′10″N 91°26′23″E
- Country: Russia
- Federal subject: Khakassia
- Founded: 1675
- City status since: 30 April 1931

Government
  - Body: Council of Deputies
  - Head: Alexey Lemin
- Elevation: 245 m (804 ft)

Population (2010 Census)
  - Total: 165,214
  - Estimate (2025): 173,200 (+4.8%)
  - Rank: 109th in 2010

Administrative status
  - Subordinated to: City of Abakan
  - Capital of: Republic of Khakassia
  - Capital of: City of Abakan

Municipal status
  - Urban okrug: Abakan Urban Okrug
  - Capital of: Abakan Urban Okrug
- Time zone: UTC+7 (MSK+4)
- Postal codes: 655000; 655001; 655002; 655003; 655004; 655005; 655006; 655007; 655008; 655009; 655010; 655011; 655012; 655014; 655015; 655016; 655017; 655018; 655019; 655022; 655400; 655401; 655899; 655961; 655965; 655966; 655990; 655996.
- Dialing code: +7 3902
- OKTMO ID: 95701000001
- City Day: Second to last Saturday in August
- Website: абакан.рф

Abakan (Russian: Абака́н [ɐbɐˈkan]; Khakas: Ағбан Ağban, Абахан Abaxan) is the capital city of Khakassia, Russia, located in the central part of the Minusinsk Depression, at the confluence of the Yenisei and Abakan Rivers. As of the 2010 Census, it had a population of 165,214—a slight increase over 165,197 recorded during the 2002 Census and a further increase from 154,092 recorded during the 1989 Census.

Historical population
Year	Pop.	±%
1926	3,000	—
1939	36,652	+1121.7%
1959	56,416	+53.9%
1970	90,136	+59.8%
1979	128,311	+42.4%
1989	154,092	+20.1%
2002	165,197	+7.2%
2010	165,214	+0.0%
2021	184,769	+11.8%
Source: Census data

== History ==
Abakansky ostrog (Абаканский острог), also known as Abakansk (Абаканск), was built at the mouth of the Abakan River in 1675. In the 1780s, the selo of Ust-Abakanskoye (Усть-Абаканское) was established in this area. It was granted town status and given its current name on 30 April 1931.

In 1940, Russian construction workers found ancient ruins during the construction of a highway between Abakan and Askiz. When the site was excavated by Soviet archaeologists in 1941–1945, they realized that they had discovered a building absolutely unique for the area: a large (1500 square meters) Chinese-style, likely Han dynasty era (206 BC–220 AD) palace. The identity of the high-ranking personage who lived luxuriously in Chinese style, far outside the Han Empire's borders, has remained a matter for discussion ever since. Russian archaeologist Lidiya Yevtyukhova surmised, based on circumstantial evidence, that the palace may have been the residence of Li Ling, a Chinese general who had been defeated by the Xiongnu in 99 BCE, and defected to them as a result. While this opinion has remained popular, other views have been expressed as well. More recently, for example, it was claimed by Aleksey Kovalyov as the residence of Lu Fang, a Han throne pretender from the Guangwu era.

=== Lithuanian and Polish exiles ===
In the late 18th and during the 19th century, Lithuanian participants in the 1794, 1830–1831, and 1863 rebellions against Russian rule were exiled to Abakan. A group of camps was established where prisoners were forced to work in the coal mines. After Stalin's death, Lithuanian exiles from the nearby settlements moved in.

Also Polish exiles were deported to Khakassia, with the some descendants still living in the region. In 1994, a local Polish school was founded, which was supported by the local authorities until 2014, and in 1999, a Polish-language faculty was introduced at the local Khakassian State University.

== Administrative and municipal status ==
Abakan is the capital of the republic. Within the framework of administrative divisions, it is incorporated as the City of Abakan—an administrative unit with the status equal to that of the districts As a municipal division, the City of Abakan is incorporated as Abakan Urban Okrug.

== Education ==
The city has Katanov State University of Khakasia.

=== Transportation ===
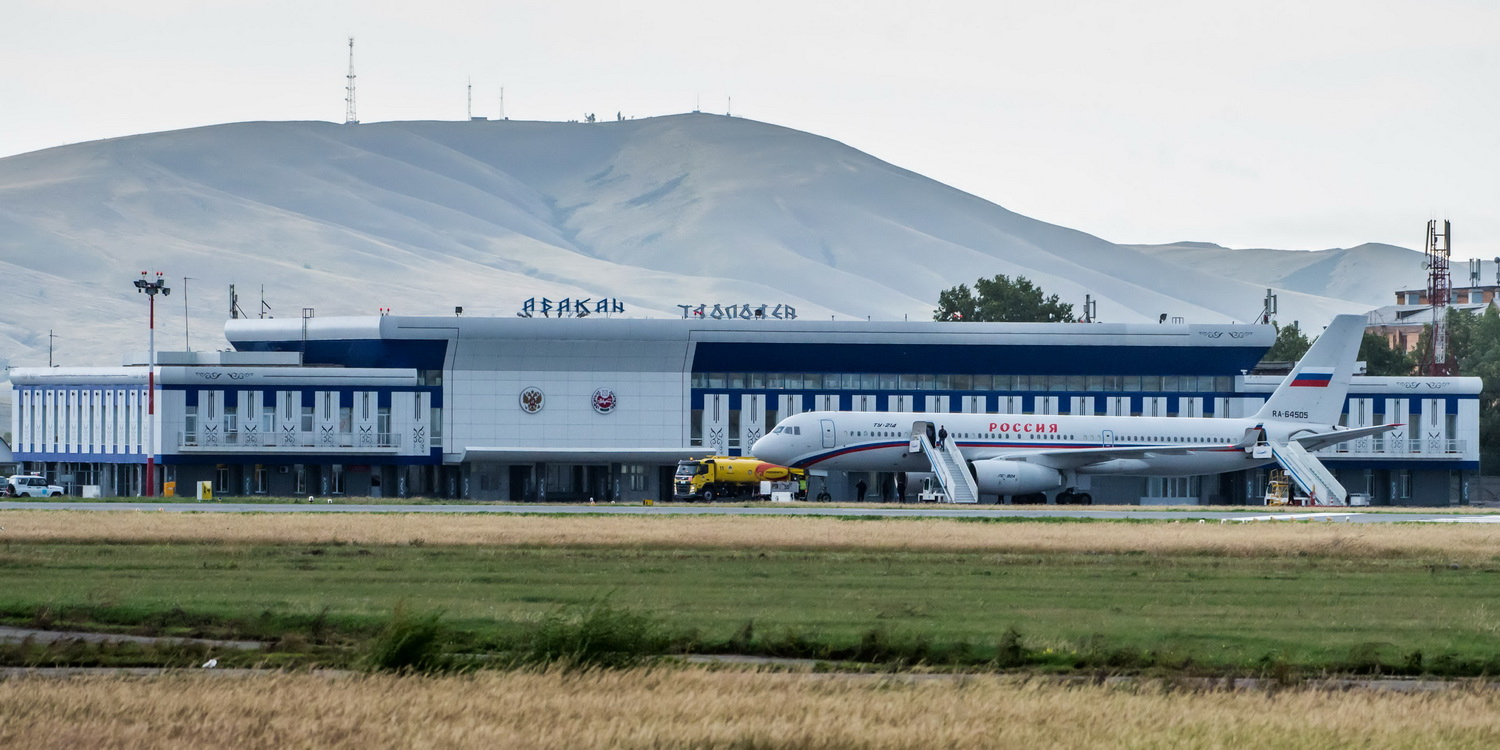
Abakan Airport

Abakan (together with Tayshet) was a terminal of the major Abakan-Taishet Railway.

The city is served by the Abakan International Airport.

== Military ==
The 100th Air Assault Brigade of the Russian Airborne Troops was based in the city until circa 1996.

== Sports ==
Bandy, similar to hockey, is one of the most popular sports in the city. Sayany-Khakassia was playing in the top-tier Super League in the 2012–13 season but was relegated for the 2013–14 season and has been playing in the Russian Bandy Supreme League ever since. The Russian Government Cup was played here in 1988 and in 2012.

== Climate ==
Abakan has a borderline dry-winter continental (Köppen climate classification Dwb)/cold semi-arid climate (Köppen BSk). Temperature differences between seasons are extreme, which is typical for Siberia. Precipitation is concentrated in the summer and is less common because of rain shadows from nearby mountains.

Climate data for Abakan, 1981–2010 normals
Month	Jan	Feb	Mar	Apr	May	Jun	Jul	Aug	Sep	Oct	Nov	Dec	Year
Record high °C (°F)	7.2 (45.0)	9.1 (48.4)	20.2 (68.4)	33.5 (92.3)	37.6 (99.7)	37.1 (98.8)	38.5 (101.3)	36.3 (97.3)	34.3 (93.7)	24.5 (76.1)	15.6 (60.1)	7.5 (45.5)	38.5 (101.3)
Mean maximum °C (°F)	0.1 (32.2)	1.8 (35.2)	11.6 (52.9)	22.5 (72.5)	30.1 (86.2)	32.3 (90.1)	33.7 (92.7)	31.5 (88.7)	25.9 (78.6)	18.3 (64.9)	8.3 (46.9)	1.8 (35.2)	34.5 (94.1)
Mean daily maximum °C (°F)	−12.3 (9.9)	−8.6 (16.5)	1.0 (33.8)	11.5 (52.7)	19.9 (67.8)	24.7 (76.5)	26.8 (80.2)	24.1 (75.4)	17.0 (62.6)	8.5 (47.3)	−2.4 (27.7)	−9.7 (14.5)	8.4 (47.1)
Daily mean °C (°F)	−17.8 (0.0)	−15.2 (4.6)	−5.4 (22.3)	4.4 (39.9)	12.3 (54.1)	17.8 (64.0)	20.4 (68.7)	17.6 (63.7)	10.7 (51.3)	2.9 (37.2)	−7.2 (19.0)	−14.8 (5.4)	2.1 (35.9)
Mean daily minimum °C (°F)	−23.3 (−9.9)	−21.8 (−7.2)	−11.8 (10.8)	−2.7 (27.1)	4.6 (40.3)	10.9 (51.6)	13.9 (57.0)	11.0 (51.8)	4.3 (39.7)	−2.7 (27.1)	−11.9 (10.6)	−19.9 (−3.8)	−4.1 (24.6)
Mean minimum °C (°F)	−34.9 (−30.8)	−33.5 (−28.3)	−25.7 (−14.3)	−11.6 (11.1)	−5.0 (23.0)	3.3 (37.9)	8.4 (47.1)	4.3 (39.7)	−3.3 (26.1)	−12.1 (10.2)	−24.5 (−12.1)	−32.7 (−26.9)	−37.4 (−35.3)
Record low °C (°F)	−47.6 (−53.7)	−45.1 (−49.2)	−38.7 (−37.7)	−23.2 (−9.8)	−11.1 (12.0)	−3.6 (25.5)	1.2 (34.2)	0.2 (32.4)	−9.5 (14.9)	−22.9 (−9.2)	−37.6 (−35.7)	−43.8 (−46.8)	−47.6 (−53.7)
Average precipitation mm (inches)	7.3 (0.29)	5.6 (0.22)	4.6 (0.18)	12.3 (0.48)	27.9 (1.10)	55.8 (2.20)	66.0 (2.60)	61.5 (2.42)	35.5 (1.40)	16.1 (0.63)	10.1 (0.40)	8.0 (0.31)	310.7 (12.23)
Average precipitation days	2.6	2.0	1.4	3.4	5.9	9.3	8.8	9.4	7.2	3.8	3.1	2.4	59.3
Source 1: Météo climat stats
Source 2: Météo Climat

== Local government ==
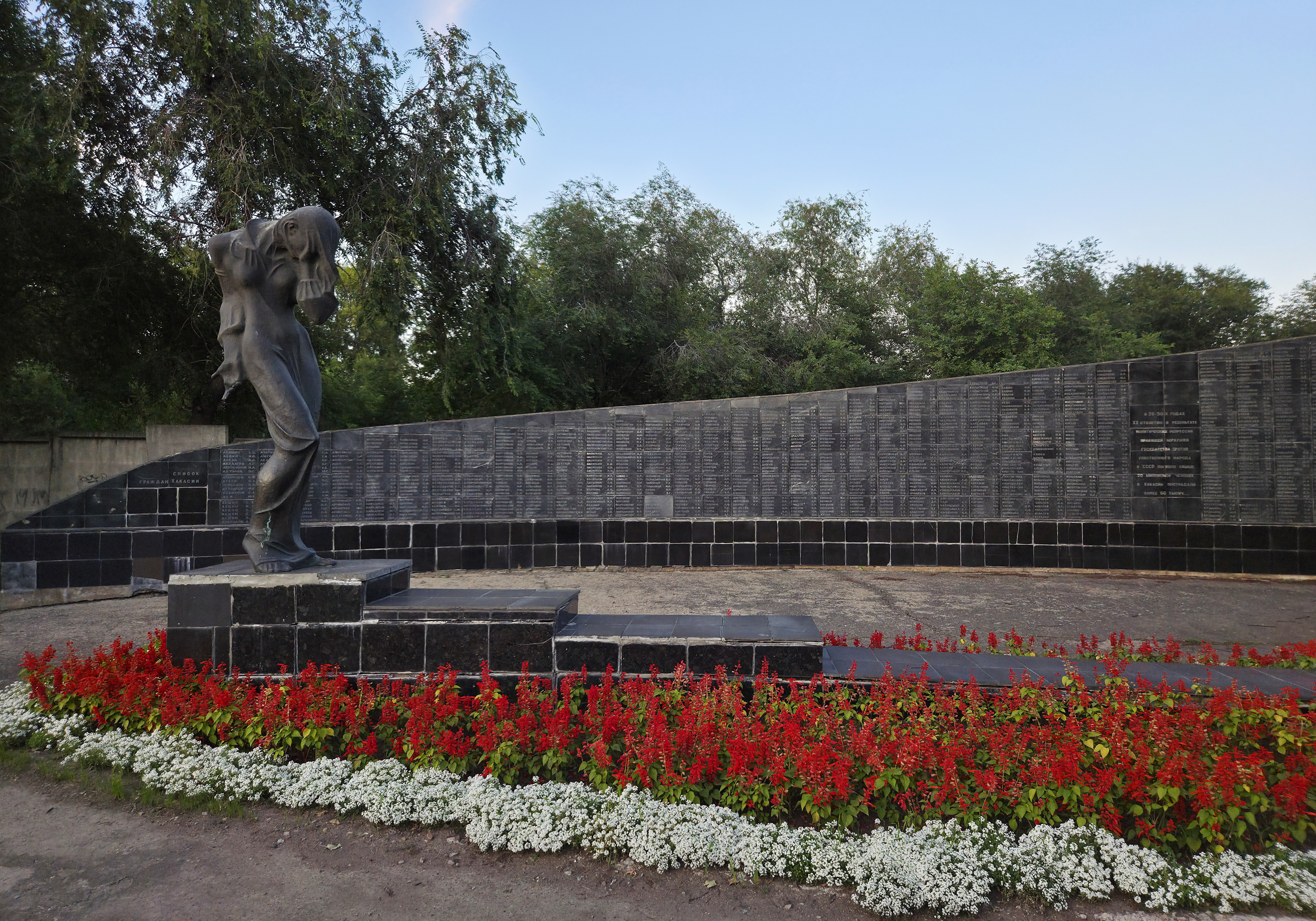
Memorial complex to victims of Stalinist repressions

The structure of the local government in the city of Abakan is as follows:

- council of deputies of the city of Abakan - a representative body of the municipality;
- the head of the city of Abakan - the head of the municipality;
- the administration of the city of Abakan - the executive and administrative body of the municipality;
- auditing commission of the municipality of the city of Abakan - the control and accounting body of the municipality.

Council of Deputies

The council consists of 28 deputies. Deputies are elected in single-member constituencies and on party lists. Elections of deputies of the VI convocation were held on a single voting day in 2018.

Composition of the City Council
Party	Number of deputies		Result
Party	By okrug	By lists	Result
United Russia	11	5 (28.83%)	16
CPRF	2	3 (23.97%)	5
LDPR	0	3 (22.19%)	3
Party of Pensioners	0	1 (7.11%)	1
A Just Russia – For Truth	0	1 (6.93%)	1
Communists of Russia	0	1 (6.83%)	1
Self-nominated	1	---	1
	14	14	28

Head of the city (head of the municipality)

- Alexey Viktorovich Lyomin

Chairman of the Council of Deputies

- Albert Yuryevich Tupikin

Nikolai Bulakin Prize

In 2021, the annual Nikolai Bulakin Prize of Abakan was established for outstanding services and achievements in the city's development. The award includes a monetary reward of 200,000 rubles and a diploma.

== Sources ==
- Верховный Совет Республики Хакасия. Закон №20 от 5 мая 2004 г. «Об административно-территориальном устройстве Республики Хакасия», в ред. Закона №54-ЗРХ от 10 июня 2015 г. «О внесении изменений в Закон Республики Хакасия "Об административно-территориальном устройстве Республики Хакасия"». Вступил в силу по истечении 10 дней со дня официального опубликования. Опубликован: "Вестник Хакасии", №22, 12 мая 2004 г. (Supreme Council of the Republic of Khakassia. Law #20 of May 5, 2004 On the Administrative-Territorial Structure of the Republic of Khakassia, as amended by the Law #54-ZRKh of June 10, 2015 On Amending the Law of the Republic of Khakassia "On the Administrative-Territorial Structure of the Republic of Khakassia". Effective as of the day which is 10 days after the official publication date.).
- Верховный Совет Республики Хакасия. Закон №59 от 7 октября 2004 г. «Об утверждении границ муниципального образования город Абакан и наделении его статусом городского округа», в ред. Закона №88-ЗРХ от 7 ноября 2014 г. «О внесении изменений в Закон Республики Хакасия "Об утверждении границ муниципального образования город Абакан и наделении его статусом городского округа"». Вступил в силу с 1 января 2005 г. Опубликован: "Вестник Хакасии", №48, 15 октября 2004 г. (Supreme Council of the Republic of Khakassia. Law #59 of October 7, 2004 On Establishing the Borders of the Municipal Formation of the City of Abakan and on Granting It Urban Okrug Status, as amended by the Law #88-ZRKh of November 7, 2014 On Amending the Law of the Republic of Khakassia "On Establishing the Borders of the Municipal Formation of the City of Abakan and on Granting It Urban Okrug Status". Effective as of January 1, 2005.).
- Абаканский городской Совет депутатов. Решение №222 от 28 декабря 2005 г. «Об утверждении устава города Абакан в новой редакции», в ред. Решения №256 от 22 сентября 2015 г. «О внесении изменений и дополнений в Устав города Абакана». Вступил в силу 21 февраля 2006 г. Опубликован: "Абакан", №6, 15–21 февраля 2006 г. (Abakan City Council of Deputies. Decision #222 of December 28, 2005 On Adopting the New Edition of the Charter of the City of Abakan, as amended by the Decision #256 of September 22, 2015 On Amending and Supplementing the Charter of the City of Abakan. Effective as of February 21, 2006.).
- Президиум Центрального исполнительного комитета СССР. Постановление от 30 апреля 1931 г. «О преобразовании села Усть-Абаканское, центра Хакасской автономной области, в город с переименованием его в "Абакан"». (Presidium of the Central Executive Committee of the USSR. Resolution of April 30, 1931 On the Transformation of the Selo of Ust-Abakanskoye, the Center of Khakas Autonomous Oblast, into a City and on Renaming It "Abakan". ).
- Anon (2012a). "Abakan, Khakasia, Russia #29865". climatebase.ru. Archived from the original on April 7, 2014.
- Anon (2011). "Russia Time Zones - Russia Current Times". TimeTemperature.com. Archived from the original on July 7, 2014.
- Yevtyukhova, L. A. (1954). "Южная Сибирь в древности [Southern Siberia in Ancient Times]". По следам древних культур: от Волги до Тихого Океана [Tracing Ancient Cultures between the Volga and the Pacific] (in Russian). Moscow, Russia. pp. 195–224.
- Hoiberg, Dale H., ed. (1993). "The New Encyclopaedia Britannica". Encyclopædia Britannica. Vol. 1: A-ak Bayes (15th ed.). Chicago, Illinois: Encyclopædia Britannica, Inc. ISBN 0-85229-961-3. LCCN 2002113989.
- Juodvalkytė, Aldona (2001). "Abakan (Abakanas)". Universal Lithuanian Encyclopedia (in Lithuanian). Vol. I: A-Ar. Vilnius, Lithuania: Science and Encyclopedia Publishing Institute.
- Kovalyov, A. A. (2007). "Китайский император на Енисее? Ещё раз о хозяине ташебинского «дворца» [Chinese Emperor on the Yenisy? Once Again About the Owner of the Tashebik "Palace"]". Этноистория и археология Северной Евразии: теория, методология и практика исследования [The Ethnohistory and Archaeology of Northern Eurasia: Theory, Methods, and Practice] (PDF) (in Russian). Irkutsk, Russian. pp. 145–148. ISBN 978-5-8038-0430-7. Archived from the original (PDF) on August 14, 2014.
- Munro, David, ed. (1995). "Abakan". Oxford Dictionary of the World. Oxford, UK: Oxford University Press. ISBN 0-19-866184-3.
- Schofield, Carey (1993). The Russian Elite: Inside Spetsnaz and the Airborne Forces. Greenhill Press. pp. 249–251. ISBN 1-8536-7155-X.
