= Askizsky District =

Askizsky District Аскизский район (Russian)
- District

Other transcription(s)
  - Khakas: Асхыс аймағы
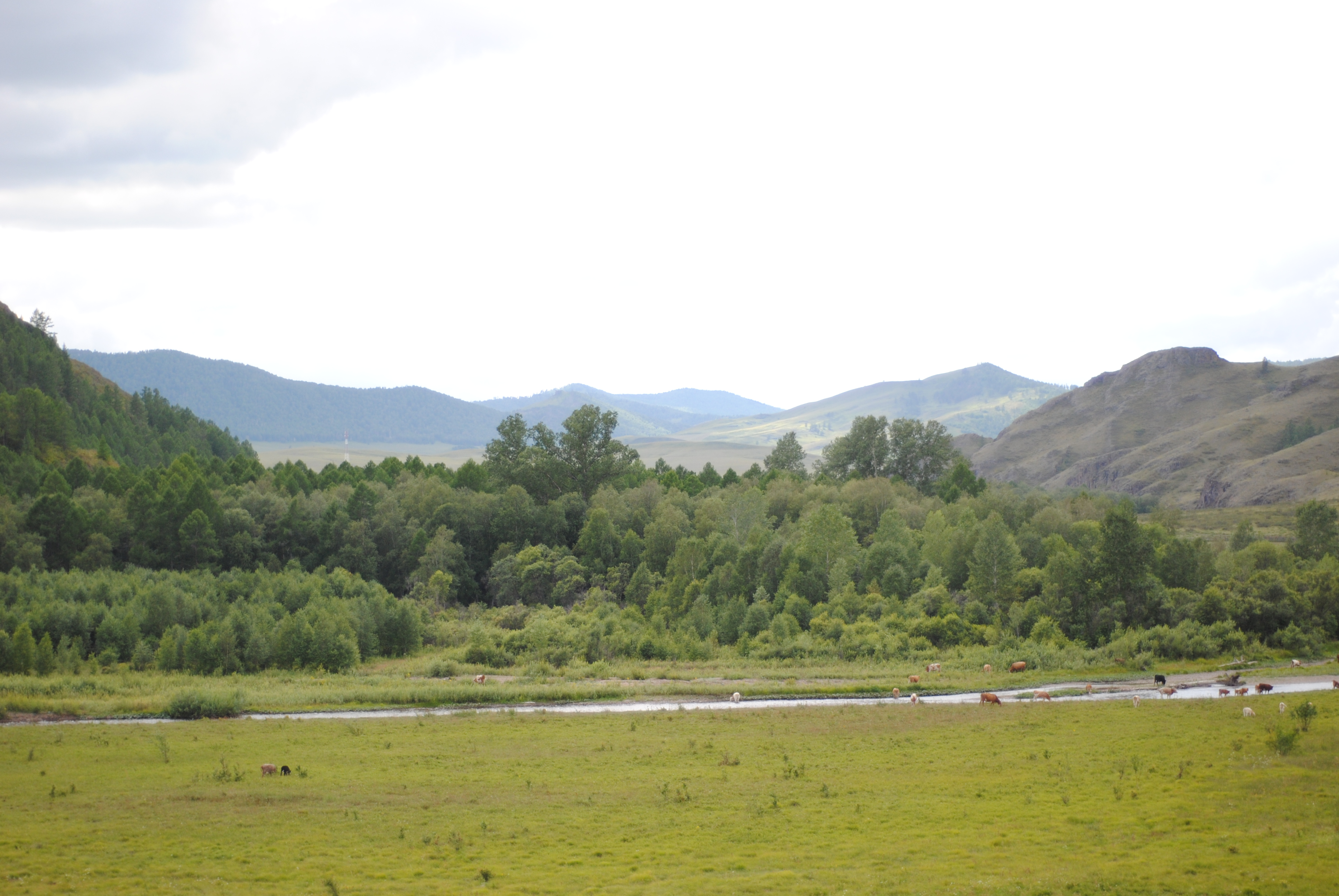
- Kazanovka Nature Park, Askizsky District

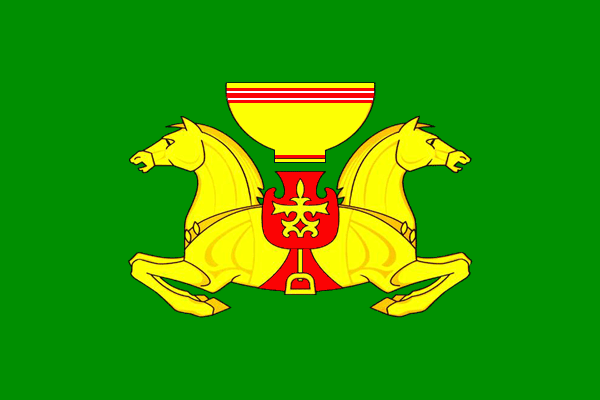
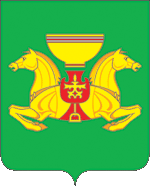
- Flag Coat of arms
- Location of Askizsky District in the Republic of Khakassia
- Coordinates: 53°08′N 90°32′E
- Country: Russia
- Federal subject: Republic of Khakassia
- Established: 1924
- Administrative center: Askiz

Area
  - Total: 7,536 km^{2} (2,910 sq mi)

Population (2010 Census)
  - Total: 40,912
  - Density: 5.429/km^{2} (14.06/sq mi)
  - Urban: 25.0%
  - Rural: 75.0%

Administrative structure
  - Administrative divisions: 3 Urban-type settlements (settlement councils), 11 Selsoviets
  - Inhabited localities: 3 urban-type settlements, 61 rural localities

Municipal structure
  - Municipally incorporated as: Askizsky Municipal District
  - Municipal divisions: 3 urban settlements, 11 rural settlements
- Time zone: UTC+7 (MSK+4)
- OKTMO ID: 95608000
- Website: http://askiz.org/

Askizsky District (Russian: Аски́зский райо́н; Khakas: Асхыс аймағы, Asxıs aymağı) is an administrative and municipal district (raion), one of the eight in the Republic of Khakassia, Russia. It is located in the central and western parts of the republic. The area of the district is 7,536 square kilometers (2,910 sq mi). Its administrative center is the rural locality (a selo) of Askiz. Population: 40,912 (2010 census); 43,601 (2002 census); 49,793 (1989 Soviet census). The population of the administrative center accounts for 17.8% of the district's total population.

== Demographics ==
As of the 2010 Census the ethnic breakdown of Askizsky District was the following:
Khakasses: 50.45%
Russians: 43.68%
Germans: 1.08%
Others: 4.79%

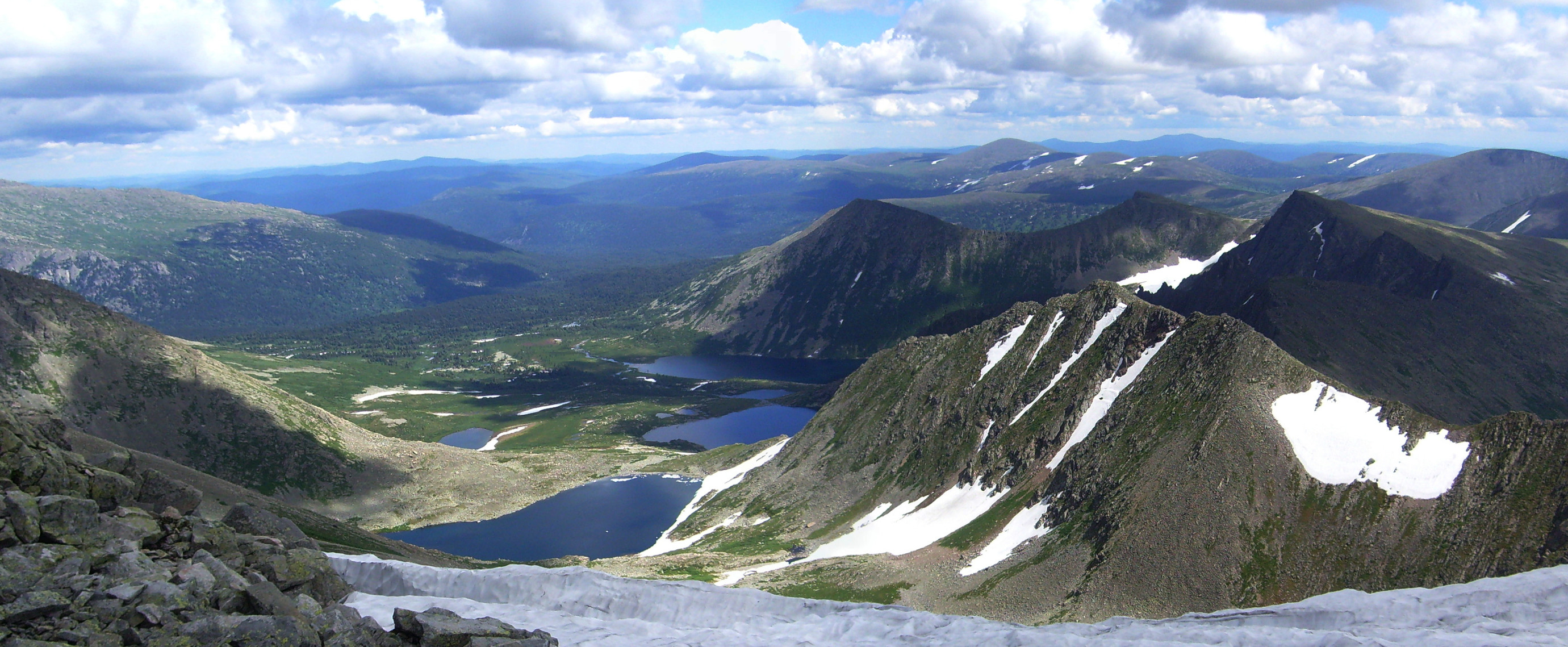
Tigirtish Ridge, Golden Valley, Askizsky District
