= Olga Timofeyeva (politician, born 1967) =

Russian politician (born 1967)

- Ольга Тимофеева
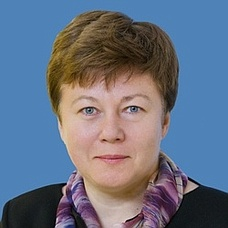

Deputy Governor of Sevastopol
- Incumbent
- Assumed office 8 October 2019
- Preceded by: Andrey Shishkin

Deputy Governor of Sevastopol (acting)
- In office 30 September 2019 – 8 October 2019

Russian Federation Senator from Sevastopol
- In office 24 October 2014 – 14 September 2019
- Succeeded by: Yekaterina Altabayeva

Member of the Legislative Assembly of Sevastopol
- In office 14 September 2014 – 24 October 2014

Member of the Leninsky District Council of Sevastopol
- In office 2006–2010

Personal details
- Born: Olga Leonidovna Timofeyeva; 28 April 1967 (age 59) Gorky, Soviet Union
- Party: Rodina (since 2019); United Russia (2014-2019)

Olga Leonidovna Timofeyeva (Russian: Ольга Леонидовна Тимофеева; born on 28 April 1967), is a Russian politician who is currently the Deputy Governor of Sevastopol since 8 October 2019.

Timofeyeva had served as a Member of the Federation Council from the Legislative Authority of Sevastopol from 2014 to 2019.

Timofeyeva had also served as a Member of the Legislative Assembly of Sevastopol in 2014.

== Biography ==
Olga Timofeyeva was born in Gorky (Nizhny Novgorod) on 28 April 1967.

In 1990, she graduated from the Sevastopol Instrument-Making Institute with a degree in Automation and Mechanization of Processing and Issuing Information, since that time she has been an employee of the Department of Information Systems of the Sevastopol National Technical University (SevNTU) - Sevastopol Instrument-Making Institute.

From 2006 to 2010, she was a member of the Leninsky District Council of Sevastopol of the 5th convocation.

On 19 November 2013, among 69 activists, Timofeyeva signed an appeal to deputies of all levels of the city of Sevastopol with a demand to publicly declare their attitude to the requirements of Ukraine's European integration.

In 2014, she was a senior lecturer at the Department of Information Systems of the Sevastopol National Technical University.

On 23 February 2014, Timofeyev participated in the rally of the "Narodnaya Volya" on Nakhimov Square in Sevastopol, spoke at it in support of the election of Alexei Chaly as chairman of the city executive committee, and after his election by voting here, at the rally, announced the transfer of all power in the city to the executive committee. She heads the Ravelin human rights group and the regional headquarters of the All-Russian Popular Front in Sevastopol.

On 4 September 2014, she was elected on the list of United Russia as a member of parliament, a deputy of the Legislative Assembly of Sevastopol.

On 21 October 2014, the Legislative Assembly of Sevastopol confirmed the powers of Timofeeva as a member of the Federation Council.

On 13 June 2019, Timofeyeva left the United Russia party. In the elections to the Legislative Assembly of Sevastopol of the 2nd convocation, she was nominated from the Rodina party. On 22 July 2019, Rodina was among the five parties suspended from participating in the elections due to claims against the signatures it had collected. Timofeyeva acknowledged the existence of shortcomings, but called them insignificant and formal, since they mainly relate to the registration of records about signature collectors.

On 14 September 2019, the deputies voted to empower their former speaker Yekaterina Altabayeva as a member of the Federation Council - a representative of the legislative power of Sevastopol.

On 30 September 2019, during the formation of the new government of Sevastopol, Timofeyeva was appointed the Acting Deputy Governor, with her responsibilities that included within the Department of Education and Science, the Main Department of Culture and the Department of Sports.

On 8 October 2019, Timofeyeva was approved as the Deputy Governor.
