= Valery Kulikov =

Ukrainian-Russian politician (born 1956)

- Валерий Куликов
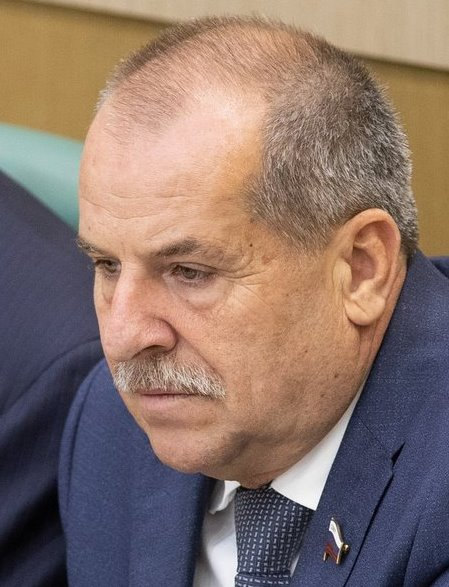
- Kulikov in 2018

Russian Federation Senator from Sevastopol
- In office 19 September 2017 – 2 October 2020
- Preceded by: Andrey Sobolyev
- Succeeded by: Yekaterina Altabayeva

Personal details
- Born: 1 September 1956 (age 70) Zaporozhye, Ukrainian SSR, Soviet Union
- Party: Independent

Valery Vladimirovich Kulikov (Russian: Валерий Владимирович Куликов; born 1 September 1956) is a Ukrainian-born Russian politician, and former military commander. He served as the member of the Federation Council of from the executive branch of Sevastopol from 19 September 2017 to September 2020. Kulikov has the rank of vice admiral, and was a deputy commander of the Black Sea Fleet.

== Biography ==
Valery Kulikov was born on 1 September 1956 in Zaporizhzhia, then in the Ukrainian SSR, Soviet Union. In 1974, he began active military service in the border troops. In 1980 he graduated from the Black Sea Higher Naval School named after P.S. Nakhimov and received a referral to the Black Sea Fleet. In 1994, he graduated from the Kuznetsov Naval Academy.

He held the positions of battery commander on the patrol ship Pylky, commander of a missile and artillery warhead on patrol ships Pylky, Razitelny, and Ladny, and was a senior assistant commander of the patrol ship Bezzavetny and missile cruiser Slava, and commander of the missile cruisers Admiral Golovko and Moskva, the commander of a brigade of landing ships, and the head of the combat training directorate of the Black Sea Fleet, and headed the combat training directorates of the Baltic Fleet and the Navy.

Since February 2010, Kulikov was the acting commander of the Caspian Flotilla. On 29 September 2010, Rear Admiral Sergei Alyokminsky was appointed the new commander.

In 2013, with the rank of Rear Admiral, by decree of Russian President Vladimir Putin, Kulikov was appointed Deputy Commander of the Black Sea Fleet.

By the decree of the President of the Russian Federation of 5 May 2014 No. 302, by Putin, Kulikov was awarded the military rank of Vice Admiral.

On 19 September 2017, by the decree of the Governor of Sevastopol, Dmitry Ovsyannikov, Kulikov was vested with the powers of a member of the Federation Council - a representative of the executive body of state power of Sevastopol.

On 26 September 2017, by presidential decree, Kulikov was relieved of his post as deputy commander of the Black Sea Fleet and dismissed from military service with the rank of vice admiral.

On 13 September 2020, as a candidate from United Russia, he won with a score of 43.35% in the by-elections to the Legislative Assembly of Sevastopol in district No. 2, which remained vacant for several months after Yekaterina Altabayeva was approved as the representative of the Legislative Assembly in the Federation Council.

He left the Federation Council on 2 October 2020.
