= Head of the Republic of Khakassia =

Highest-ranking official in Khakassia, Russia

- Хакас Республиканың Пазы (Khakas); Глава Республики Хакасия (Russian)
- Standard of the head of the republic

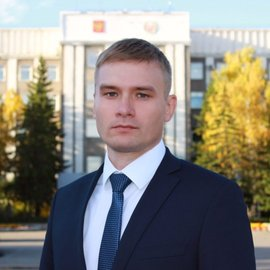
- Incumbent; Valentin Konovalov since 15 November 2018
- Executive branch of the Republic of Khakassia
- Style: His Excellency; The Honorable
- Type: Governor; Head of state; Head of government
- Seat: Abakan
- Appointer: Direct election
- Term length: 5 years, renewable once
- Formation: 3 July 1991
- First holder: Vladislav Torosov
- Website: Official website

The Head of the Republic – Prime Minister of the Republic of Khakassia (Note: Russian: Глава Республики Хакасия — Председатель Правительства Республики Хакасия; Khakas: Хакас Республиканың Пазы — Хакас Республика Правительствозының Кнезі, romanized: Xakas Respublikazınıñ Pazı — Xakas Respublika Pravitelstvozınıñ Knezĕ) is the highest office within the Government of the Republic of Khakassia in Russia. The Head is elected by citizens of Russia residing in the republic. Term of service is five years.

== List ==
No.	Portrait	Name (born–died)	Term of office			Political party	Elected	Ref.
No.	Portrait	Name (born–died)	Took office	Left office	Time in office	Political party	Elected	Ref.
Chairman of the Executive Committee of the Council of People's Deputies
1		Vladislav Torosov (1937–2018)	3 July 1991	5 February 1992	217 days	Communist Party	1991	
Prime Minister
2		Yevgeny Smirnov (born 1937)	5 February 1992	8 January 1997	4 years, 338 days	Communist Party	–	
3		Aleksey Lebed (1955–2019)	8 January 1997	14 January 2009	12 years, 6 days	Independent	1996	
3		Aleksey Lebed (1955–2019)	8 January 1997	14 January 2009	12 years, 6 days	Independent	2000	
3		Aleksey Lebed (1955–2019)	8 January 1997	14 January 2009	12 years, 6 days	United Russia	2004	
Head of Republic — Prime Minister
4		Viktor Zimin (1962–2020)	15 January 2009	14 January 2013	9 years, 261 days	United Russia	2008 (Note: Appointed by the President of Russia with the consent of the Supreme Council.)	
–		Viktor Zimin (1962–2020)	14 January 2013	18 September 2013	9 years, 261 days	United Russia	– (Note: Acting head of the republic.)	
(4)		Viktor Zimin (1962–2020)	18 September 2013	3 October 2018	9 years, 261 days	United Russia	2013	
–		Mikhail Razvozhayev (born 1980)	3 October 2018	15 November 2018	43 days	Independent	–	
5		Valentin Konovalov (born 1987)	15 November 2018	Incumbent	7 years, 296 days	Communist Party	2018	
5		Valentin Konovalov (born 1987)	15 November 2018	Incumbent	7 years, 296 days	Communist Party	2023	
