= Yekaterina Altabayeva =

Russian politician

- Екатерина Алтабаева
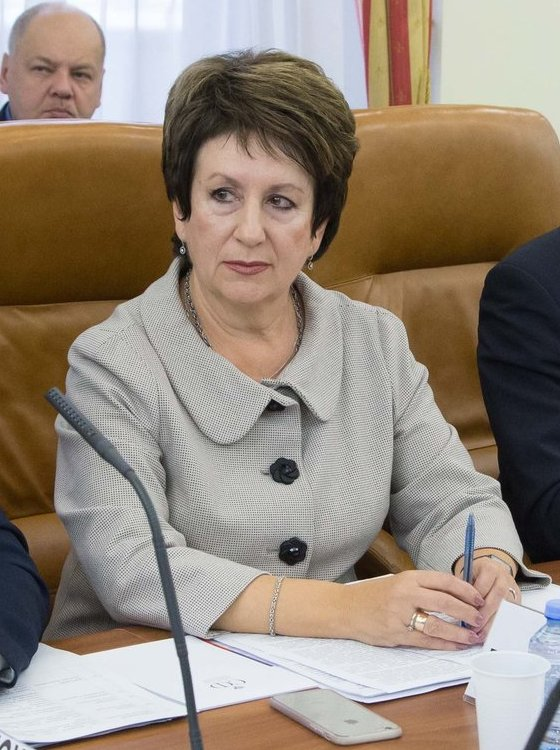
- Altabayeva in 2018

Russian Federation Senator from Sevastopol
- Incumbent
- Assumed office 2 October 2020 Serving with Sergey Kolbin
- Preceded by: Valery Kulikov
- In office 14 September 2019 – 2 October 2020
- Preceded by: Olga Timofeyeva
- Succeeded by: Sergey Kolbin

Chairman of the Legislative Assembly of Sevastopol
- In office 6 September 2016 – 14 September 2019
- Preceded by: Alexey Chaly
- Succeeded by: Vladimir Nemtsev

Member of the Legislative Assembly of Sevastopol
- In office 15 September 2014 – 14 September 2019

Personal details
- Born: Yekaterina Borisovna Altabayeva; 27 May 1956 (age 70) Uglich, Russian SFSR, Soviet Union
- Party: United Russia

Yekaterina Borisovna Altabayeva (Russian: Екатерина Борисовна Алтабаева; born 27 May 1956) is a Russian politician who serves as Member of the Federation Council from the executive authority from Russian-controlled Sevastopol since 2 October 2020. Additionally, she served as the member from the legislative authority of Sevastopol from 2019 to 2020.

Altabayeva had also served as a member of the Russian Legislative Assembly of Sevastopol and was its chair from 2016 to 2019.

== Biography ==
Yekaterina Altabayeva was born in Uglich on 27 May 1956 and has lived in Sevastopol ever since.

From 1973 to 1976, she worked as a pioneer leader in the Artek Pioneer Camp.

In 1982, after graduating from Simferopol State University. M. V. Frunze, worked at school, as a history teacher, and head teacher for extracurricular educational work.

From 1995 to 2014, she was a senior lecturer at the Department of History and Social Sciences and Humanities at the Sevastopol City University for the Humanities.

On 15 September 2014, after the Annexation of Crimea by the Russian Federation, Altabayeva became a member of the Legislative Assembly of Sevastopol, elected from single-member constituency No. 2, and became the Deputy Chairman of the Legislative Assembly.

From 22 March to 6 September 2016, she served as Acting Chairman of the Legislative Assembly of Sevastopol.

On 6 September, she was approved as the Chairman of the Legislative Assembly of Sevastopol.

On 14 September 2019, Altabayeva lost the powers of the Chairman of the Legislative Assembly of Sevastopol, as she is appointed to the Federation Council as a member of the legislative authority of Sevastopol for five years. Her successor, Vladimir Nemtsev became the new speaker. On 2 October 2020, the Governor of Sevastopol, Mikhail Razvozhayev, signed a decree on the appointment of Altabayeva to the Federation Council from the executive body of state power of Sevastopol for a period up to 2025.

=== Scientific activity ===
She developed a training course "History of Sevastopol and its environs from ancient times to the middle of the 20th century" ("Sevastopol studies").

She is also the author of six educational books on the history of Sevastopol, more than 40 scientific and methodological manuals.

== Awards ==
- Medal of the Order "For Merit to the Fatherland", 2nd class (24 January 2025) — for contributions to the development of parliamentarism, active legislative activity, and many years of conscientious work.
- Laureate of the Sevastopol Forum "Public Recognition" (2005)
- Imperial Medal "In Commemoration of the 100th Anniversary of the Great War of 1914–1918" (2016)
