= 2018 Khakassia Supreme Council election =

- 9 September 2018

All 50 seats to the Supreme Council 26 seats needed for a majority
- Turnout: 41.73%
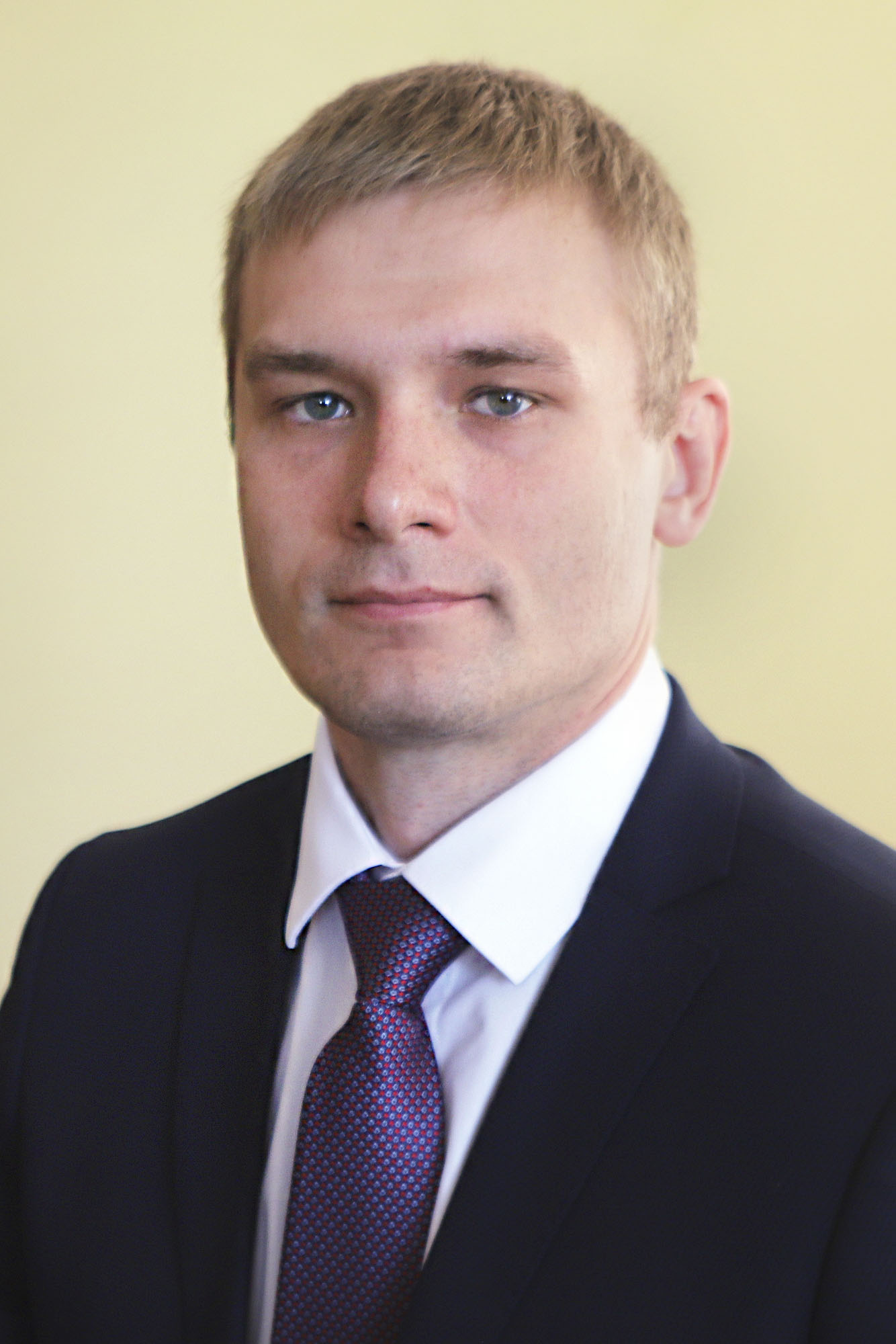

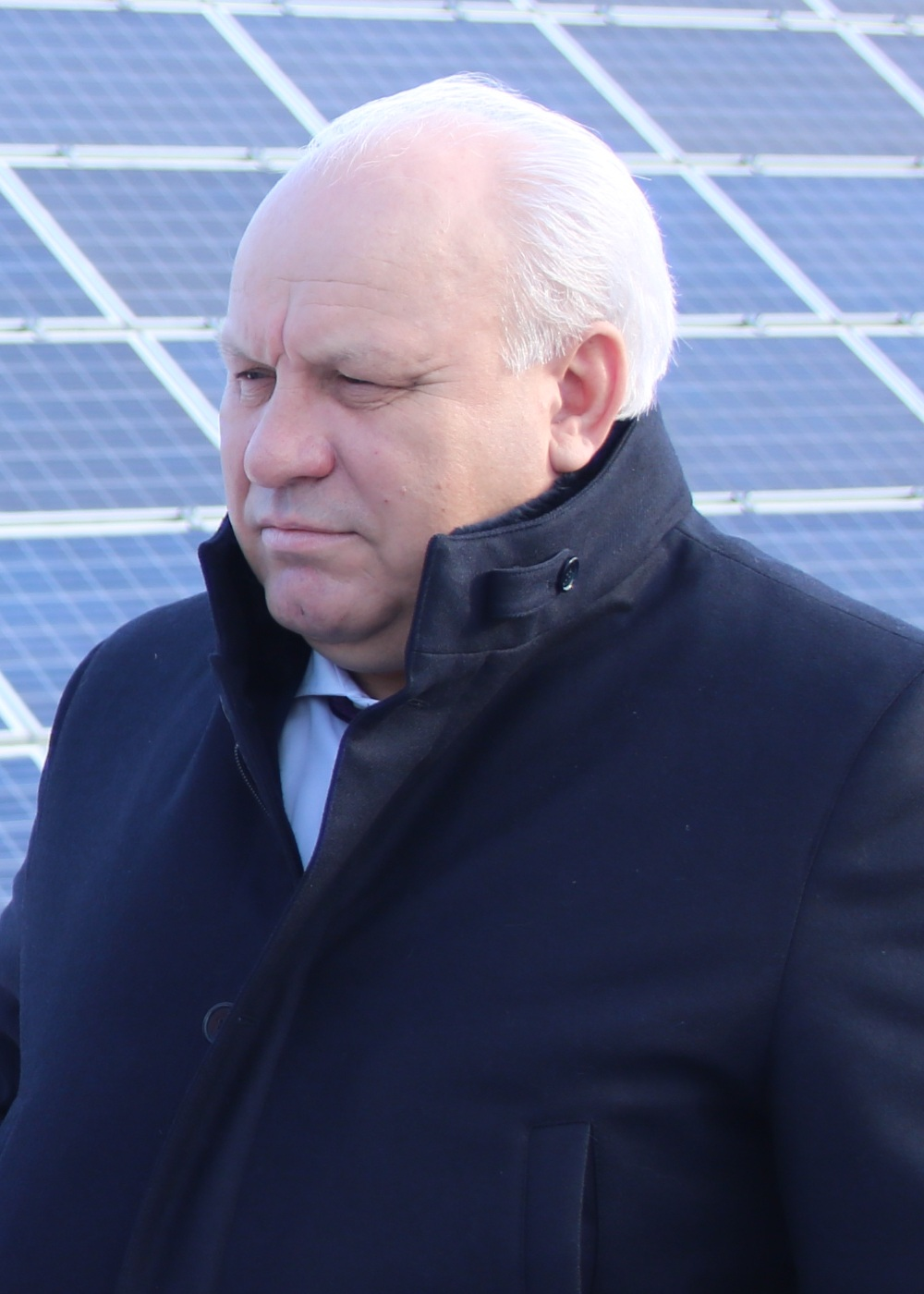

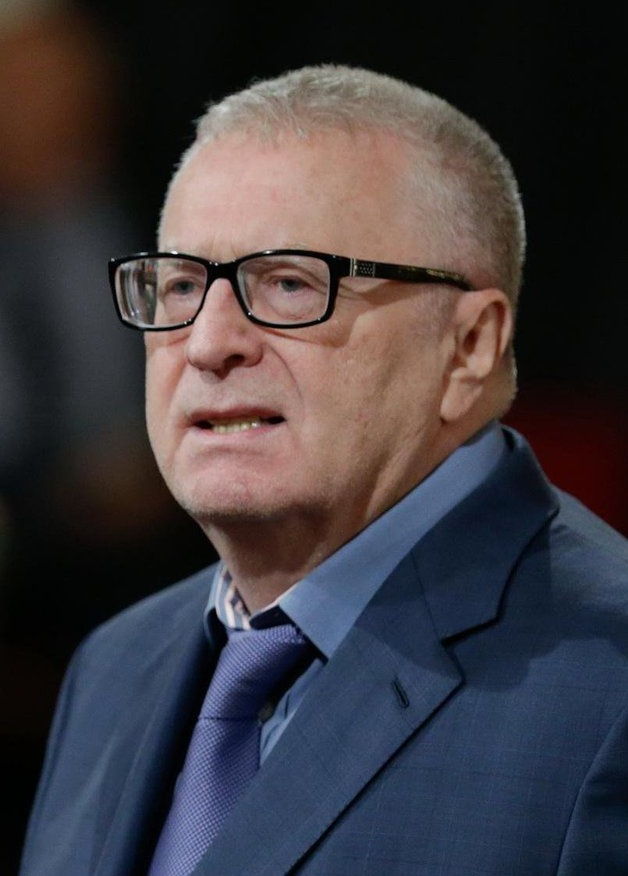
	First party	Second party	Third party
Leader	Valentin Konovalov	Viktor Zimin	Vladimir Zhirinovsky
Party	CPRF	United Russia	LDPR
Last election	6	34	5
Seats won	16	17	9
Seat change	▲10	▼17	▲4
Popular vote	49,460	40,604	33,437
Percentage	31.01%	25.46%	20.97%
- Results by all-republican constituency (left) and single-member constituencies (right)
Speaker before election
Vladimir Shtygashev
United Russia
Elected Speaker
Vladimir Shtygashev
United Russia

Elections to the Supreme Council of Khakassia took place on Common Electoral Day 9 September 2018. The Supreme Council is elected for a term of five years, with parallel voting. 25 seats are elected by proportional representation from party lists with a 5% electoral threshold, the whole Republic forming a single constituency, and another 25 seats are elected in single-member constituencies using the first-past-the-post system.

Going into the elections, United Russia is the ruling party after winning the 2013 elections with 34 seats. As a result of the elections, none of the parties received an absolute majority (26 seats). The Communist Party won the majority of votes in the all-republican constituency, United Russia won the majority of single-member constituencies and received a relative majority of seats.

Elections to the Supreme Council were held on the same day as the first round of elections of the Head of Republic.

== Participating parties ==
Parties participating in the elections:

Party	No. 1 in party list	2013 election	
United Russia	Viktor Zimin	46.3%	34 / 50
Liberal Democratic Party	Vladimir Zhirinovsky	16.6%	5 / 50
Communist Party	Valentin Konovalov	14.4%	6 / 50
Communists of Russia	Denis Brazauskas	6.4%	2 / 50
A Just Russia	Andrey Filyagin	3.9%	0 / 50
Patriots of Russia	Vasily Shiroky	3.8%	1 / 50
Party of Pensioners	None	3.2%	1 / 50
The Greens	None	1.8%	0 / 50
Party of Small Business	None	DNP	0 / 50
Independent	None	None	2 / 50

== Opinion polls ==
Date	Poll source	UR	CPRF	LDPR	JR	CR	PR	Spoil the ballot	Undecided	Abstention	Lead
27-31 August	FOM	30%	16%	12%	2%	2%	1%	3%	24%	12%	14%
8 September 2013	election result	46.3%	14.4%	16.6%	3.9%	6.4%	3.8%	—	—	—	29.7%

== Result ==
Party	Party list				SMC	Total result	
Party	Votes	%	±pp	Seats	Seats	Seats	+/–
Communist Party	49,460	31.01%	▲16.61%	8	8	16	▲10
United Russia	40,604	25.46%	▼20.86%	7	10	17	▼17
Liberal Democratic Party	33,437	20.97%	▲4.42%	6	3	9	▲4
Communists of Russia	12,782	8.01%	▲1.57%	2	0	2	Steady
A Just Russia	11,306	7.09%	▲3.18%	2	0	2	▲2
Patriots of Russia	2,834	1.78%	▼2.05%	0	1	1	Steady
Party of Pensioners					1	1	Steady
The Greens					0	0	Steady
Party of Small Business					0	0	Steady
Independent					2	2	Steady
Invalid/blank votes	9,063	5.68%	▲2.08%				
Total	159,486	100		25	25	50	Steady
Registered voters/turnout	382,219	41.73	▲3.91%				
