= Governor of Sevastopol =

Governor of Sevastopol is a government post that existed in several countries and originally established in the Russian Empire:

- Governor of Sevastopol (Russian Empire), a head of the City Municipality 1872–1920
- Governor of Sevastopol (Ukraine), a chairperson of the City State Administration 1992–2014, originally as a presidential representative in Sevastopol
- Governor of Sevastopol (Russia), a post established in 2014
