= 2017 Sevastopol gubernatorial election =

← 2014	10 September 2017	2020 →
- Turnout: 34.2%
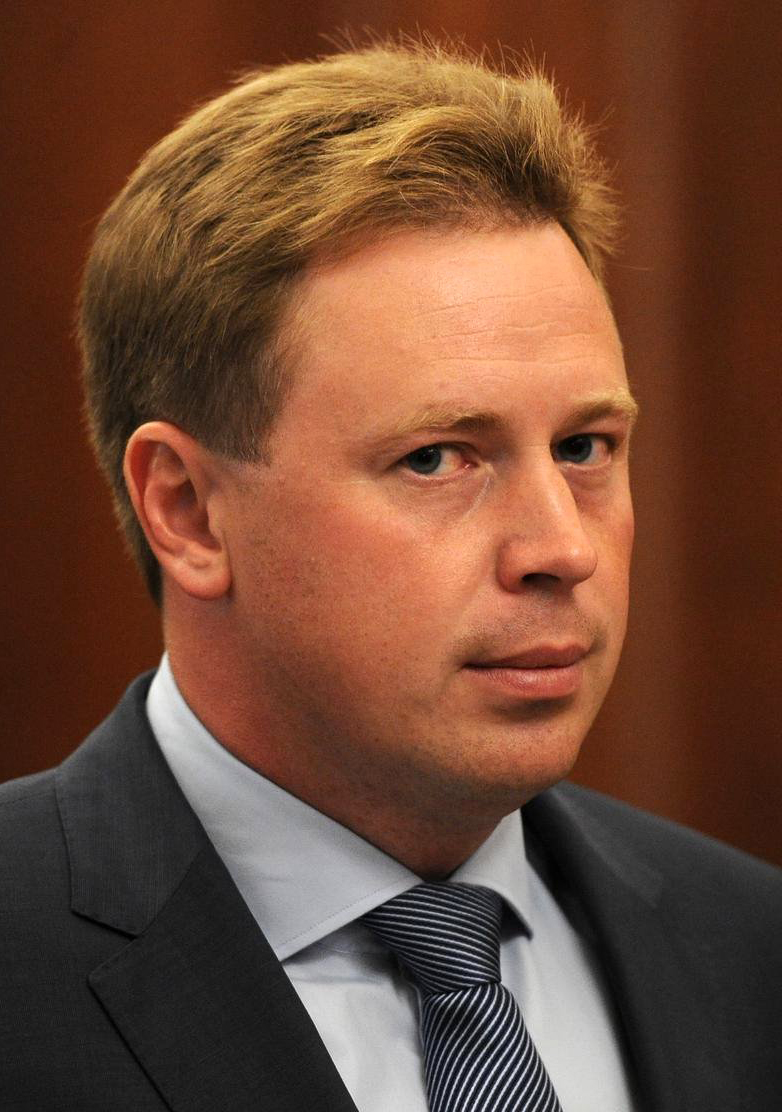
Nominee	Dmitry Ovsyannikov
Party	United Russia
Popular vote	77,406
Percentage	71.05%
Acting Governor before election
Dmitry Ovsyannikov
Independent
Elected Governor
Dmitry Ovsyannikov
Independent

Governor Election in Sevastopol were held on 10 September 2017. It was the second election of the Governor of Sevastopol after the 2014 Russian annexation of Crimea, and was the first direct elections for Governor (last time the Governor was elected to the Legislative Assembly).

== Background ==
The previous Governor of Sevastopol Sergey Menyailo, who was appointed after the 2014 Russian annexation of Crimea, in the summer of 2016 was appointed representative of Russian President to the Siberian Federal District. The acting Governor was appointed Dmitry Ovsyannikov.

March 14, 2017, the Legislative Assembly of Sevastopol adopted the law on the introduction of direct elections of the Governor.

== Result ==
Candidate	Party	Votes	%
Dmitry Ovsyannikov	United Russia	77,406	71.05%
Roman Kiyashko	Communist Party of the Russian Federation	17,890	16.42%
Ilya Zhuravlyov	Liberal Democratic Party	8,286	7.61%
Ivan Yermakov	Patriots of Russia	2,323	2.13%
Nikolay Kryazhev	Communist Party of Social Justice	546	0.50%
Invalid ballots		2,502	2.30%
Total		108,953	100%

Voter turnout (in the) election was 34%.

== See also ==
- 2017 Russian gubernatorial elections
