= Sergey Kolbin =

Russian politician (born 1969)

- Сергей Колбин
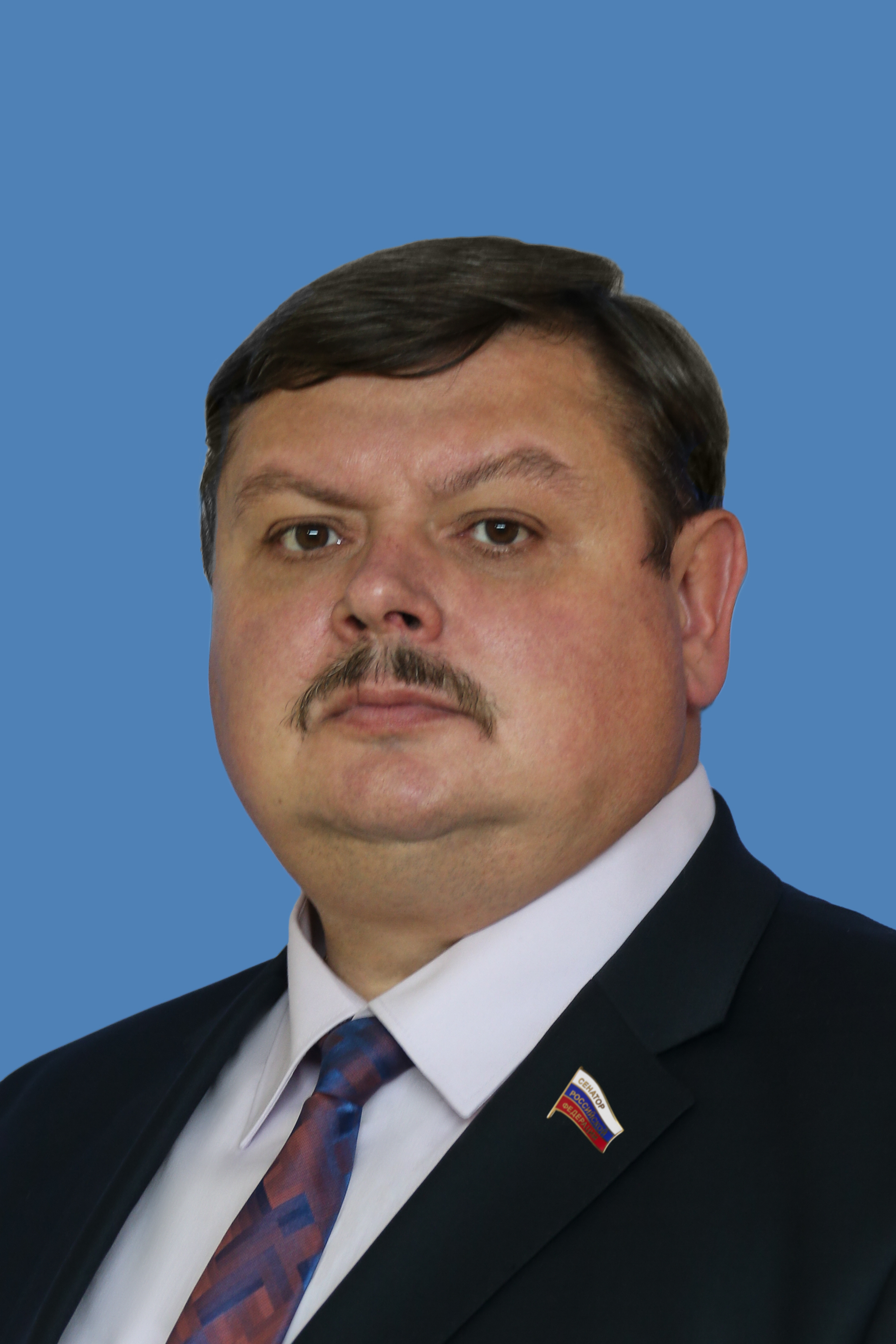

Russian Federation Senator from Sevastopol
- Incumbent
- Assumed office 29 October 2020
- Preceded by: Yekaterina Altabayeva

Member of the Legislative Assembly of Sevastopol
- In office 2019 – 29 October 2020

Personal details
- Born: Sergey Nikolayevich Kolbin; 29 October 1969 (age 56) Penza, Soviet Union
- Party: United Russia

Sergey Nikolayevich Kolbin (Russian: Сергей Николаевич Колбин; born 29 October 1969), is a Russian politician who is a member of the Federation Council from the legislative branch of Sevastopol since 2020.

Due to the Russian invasion of Ukraine, the EU and the United States added Kolbin to their sanctions lists in 2022.

== Biography ==
Sergey Kolbin was born on 29 October 1969 to a large family of Soviet officers.

In 1991, he graduated from the Donetsk Higher Military-Political School of Engineer and Signal Corps with a degree in social psychology teacher, in 2008 he graduated from the Academy of Labour and Social Relations in Moscow with a degree in law.

As a Ukrainian citizen, from 2003 to 2004, he headed the department of professional training of police officers of the personnel department of the Ministry of Internal Affairs of Sevastopol. From 2004 to 2016, he commanded a special unit of the Ministry of Internal Affairs of Ukraine "Berkut", and participated in this capacity in the events of 2013 to 2014 on the Euromaidan. He took part in the annexation of Crimea by the Russian Federation, commanded a detachment of activists at checkpoints at the entrance to the peninsula.

In 2016, he headed the department of the National Guard of Russia in Sevastopol.

In September 2018, he was appointed Deputy Head of the Main Directorate of the Russian Guard in the Republic of Crimea.

In 2019, he was elected to the Legislative Assembly of Sevastopol as a United Russia candidate.

On 29 October 2020, by the votes of 20 deputies of the Legislative Assembly, Kolbin was vested with the powers of a member of the Federation Council, a representative of the legislative body of state power of Sevastopol. Three deputies supported the Communist Party of the Russian Federation's candidate Roman Kiyashko.
