= 2018 Khakas head election =

2018 Khakassia head election
← 2013	9 September 2018 (first round); 11 November 2018 (second round)	2023 →
- Turnout: 41.77% (1st round); 45.73% (2nd round)
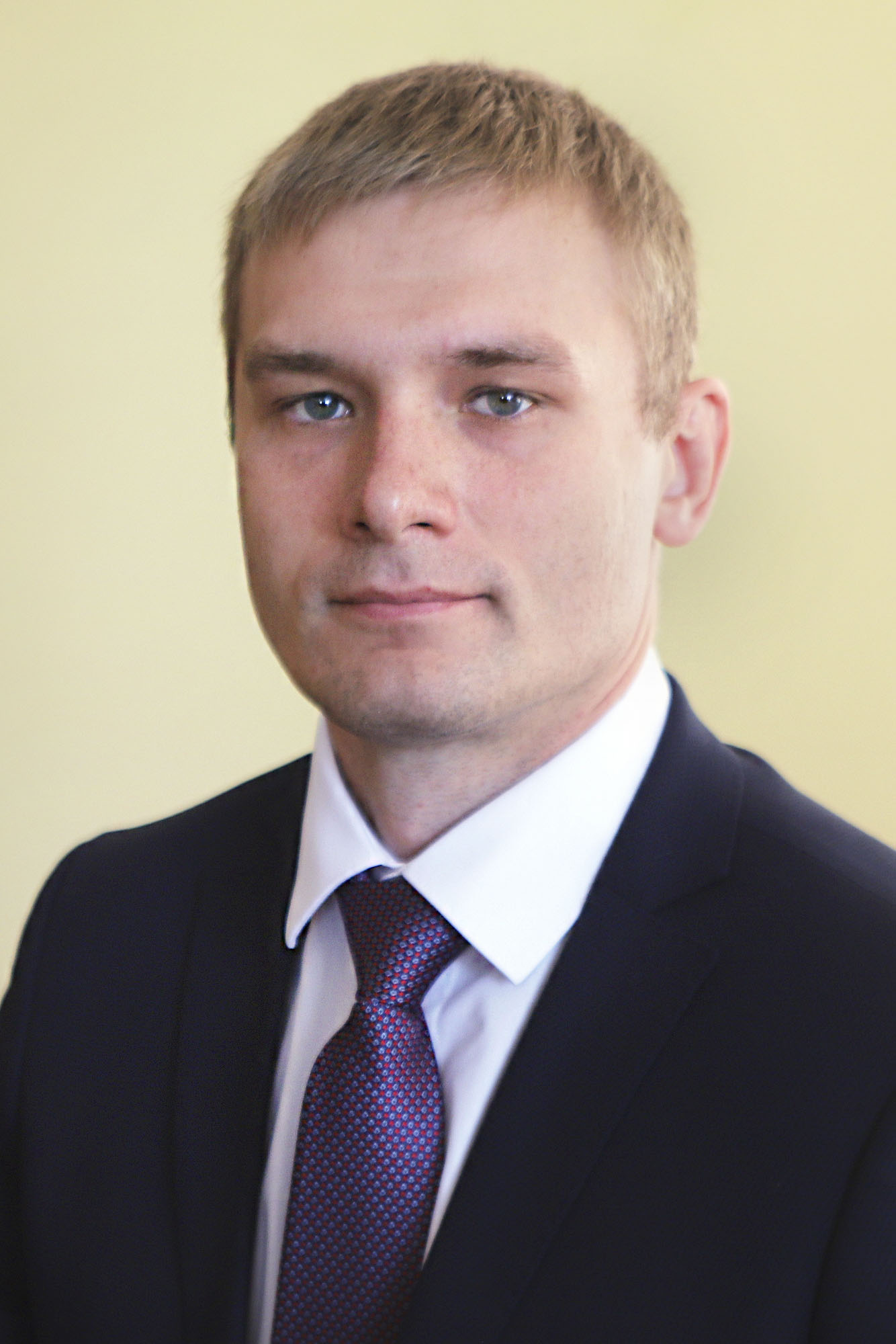
Candidate	Valentin Konovalov
Party	CPRF
Alliance	Alliance between the Communist and LDPR parties
Popular vote	101,405
Percentage	57.57%
- 2018 election of the Head of Khakassia results by municipality
Head of Republic before election
Viktor Zimin
Mikhail Razvozhayev (acting)
United Russia
Elected Head of Republic
Valentin Konovalov
CPRF

The 2018 Khakassia head election took place on 9 September 2018 in the Russian republic of Khakassia, after which opposition candidate Valentin Konovalov emerged victorious, although failing to reach the 50% threshold. The runoff was held on 11 November, which he also won.

For the first time in Russia since 1997, other candidates did not participate in the runoff, leading to a rarely used “in favour” and “against” choice.

== First round campaign ==
At the 9 September 2018 proceedings, Communist candidate Valentin Konovalov received 44% of the vote, and the incumbent Head of Republic Viktor Zimin, nominated by the United Russia, received 32% of the vote. On 21 September Viktor Zimin withdrew his candidacy. The election process dictated that law the third placed candidate, Andrey Filyagin, nominated by A Just Russia, should be included but he also withdrew his candidacy on 2 October. Alexander Myakhar, from the Party of Growth, refused to participate in the election. The withdrawals were described as part of a coordinated effort by the political establishment to prevent Konovalov from winning, as it was considered easier to defeat him with “in favour” and “against” options rather than via a choice between him and another candidate. Konovalov now needed over 50% of the valid votes being cast “in favour” to win. An “against” result would lead to a new election.

On 3 October 2018, upon the expiration of Zimin’s term, Russian President Vladimir Putin appointed Mikhail Razvozhayev as the acting Head of the Republic to serve until the second round could be conducted.

== Second Round campaign ==
Former deputy of the Supreme Council of Khakassia, Viktor Lebedev, led the anti-Konovalov forces, named ‘People's Head of Khakassia’. He called for a vote against Konovalov that would result in new elections. He was supported by the Mayor Nikolay Bulakin of Abakan, Mayor of Mikhail Valov of Sayanogorsk and rapper Denis Shulga. In the event of victory, it was hoped that the Putin-appointed interim Head Razvozhayev would take part.

Konovalov’s headquarters successfully fought off the challenge, and Konovalov was elected Head with 57.6% of the vote “in favour”.

== Candidates ==
Four candidates were registered to participate in the election

Candidate	Party	Office
Viktor Zimin	United Russia	Incumbent Head of Republic
Valentin Konovalov	Communist Party	First Secretary of the Khakassian Republican Branch of the Communist party
Alexander Myakhar	Party of Growth	Entrepreneur
Andrey Filyagin	A Just Russia	Entrepreneur

== Results ==
The results of the first (left) and second (right) rounds by territorial election commissions. Valentin Konovalov Viktor Zimin

Candidate	Party	First round		Second round	
Candidate	Party	Votes	%	Votes	%
Valentin Konovalov	Communist Party	71,553	44.81	101,405	57.57
Viktor Zimin	United Russia	51,771	32.42		
Andrey Filyagin	A Just Russia	17,930	11.23		
Alexander Myakhar	Party of Growth	10,551	6.61		
Against				72,498	41.16
Total		151,805	100	173,903	100
Valid votes		151,805	95.07	173,903	98.73
Invalid/blank ballots		7,865	4.93	2,234	1.27
Total		159670	100	176137	100
Registered voters/turnout		382,281	41.77	385,201	45.73
Source: 1st round 2nd round
