= Andrey Sobolyev =

Russian politician (1954–2026)

- Андрей Соболев
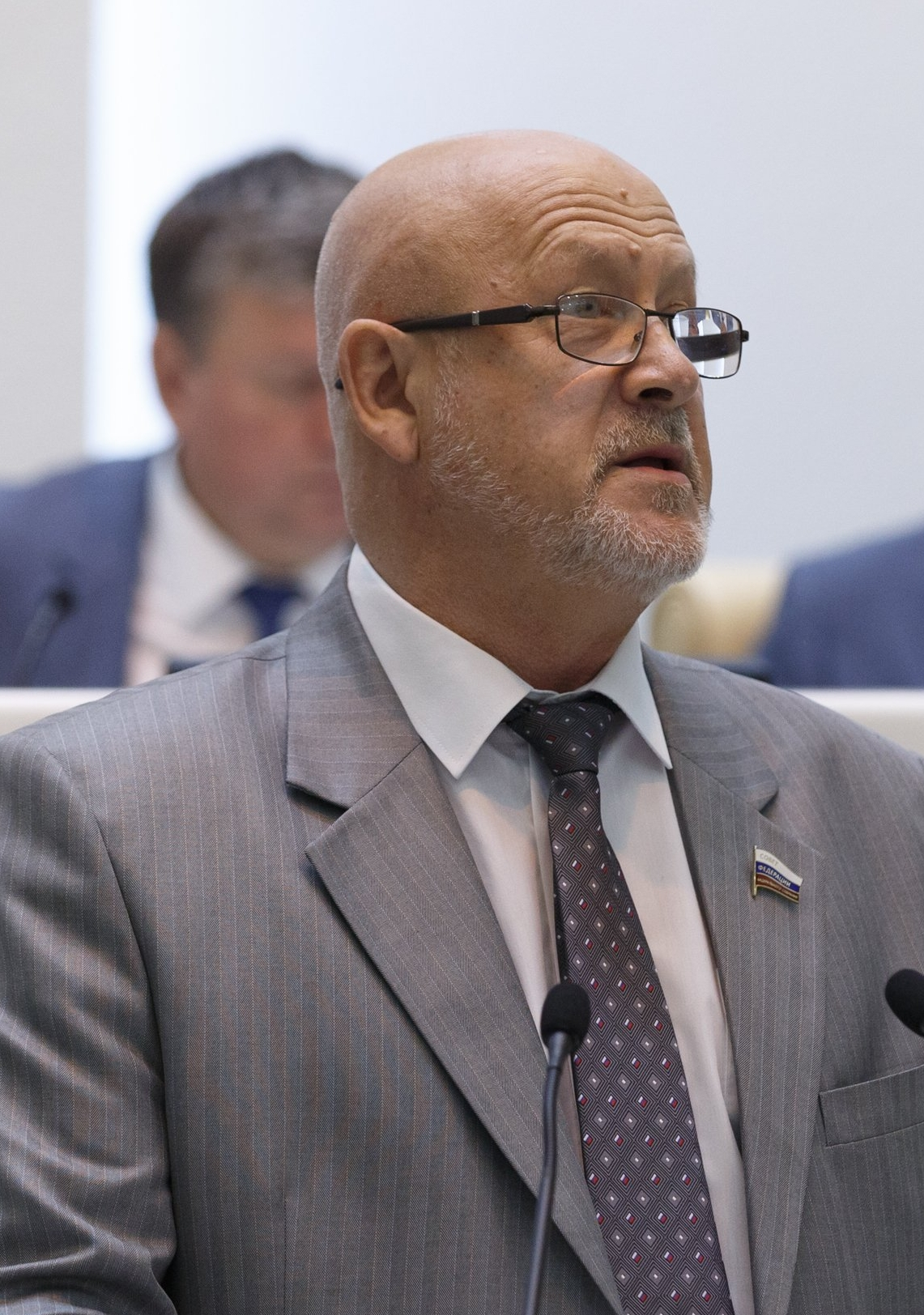
- Sobolyev in 2016

Russian Federation Senator from Sevastopol
- In office 10 October 2014 – 19 September 2017
- Succeeded by: Valery Kulikov

Personal details
- Born: 1 December 1954 Greminkha, Murmansk Oblast, Russian SFSR, Soviet Union
- Died: 17 August 2026 (aged 71)
- Party: Independent

Andrey Nikolayevich Sobolyev (Russian: Андрей Николаевич Соболев; 1 December 1954 – 17 August 2026) was a Russian politician who served as a member of the Federation Council from the executive body of state power of Sevastopol from 2014 to 2017.

Sobolyev was a member of the Federation Council Committee on Science, Education and Culture. He was also the deputy editor-in-chief of the weekly Sevastopolskaya Gazeta.

== Life and career ==
Andrey Sobolyev was born on 1 December 1954. He graduated from the Ukrainian Agricultural Academy with a degree in Forestry Engineering in 1990.

In 1999, in Sevastopol, he began to work on organizing authors' song festivals. Thanks to Sobolyev, the Balaklava Holidays festival is held every summer in Balaklava.

He was a member of the Board of the Gennady Cherkashin Foundation.

Sobolyev was awarded the Order of Friendship on 22 April 2010, for a great contribution to strengthening friendship and cooperation between the peoples of Russia and Ukraine.

On 10 October 2014, Sobolyev became the first representative of the executive body of state power of Sevastopol in the Federation Council. He was replaced by Valery Kulikov on 19 September 2017.

Sobolyev died on 17 August 2026, at the age of 71.
