= Valentin Konovalov =

Russian politician

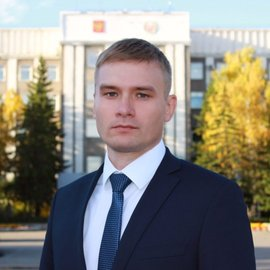

Head of the Republic of Khakassia
- Incumbent
- Assumed office 15 November 2018
- President: Vladimir Putin
- Preceded by: Viktor Zimin; Mikhail Razvozhayev (interim)

Member of the Supreme Council of Khakassia
- In office 9 September – 15 November 2018
- Constituency: 4th district

Member of the Abakan City Council
- In office 8 September 2013 – 9 September 2018

Personal details
- Born: November 30, 1987 (age 38) Okhotsk, Russian SFSR, Soviet Union (now Khabarovsk Krai, Russia)
- Party: Communist Party
- Children: 3
- Education: Khakassian State University
- Profession: lawyer

Valentin Olegovich Konovalov (Russian: Валенти́н Оле́гович Конова́лов; born November 30, 1987) is a Russian politician who has served as the Head of Khakassia since 15 November 2018.

He was a local politician before assuming the office.

A member of the Communist Party, he was supported by the right-wing LDPR in his successful bid to unseat the incumbent head Viktor Zimin of the ruling United Russia party, highlighting a rise in anti-establishment sentiment in the country during the period. Coordinated efforts to prevent him from winning the second round garnered national attention, with a similar situation occurring during his successful bid for re-election in 2023. Konovalov has described tackling corruption as the focus of his governorship.

== Biography ==
Valentin Konovalov was born on November 30, 1987, in Okhotsk, Khabarovsk Krai. When he was a child, he moved to Norilsk, Krasnoyarsk Krai, with his parents, both engineers, where he completed his education.

He went on to study at Khakassian State University in Abakan, Khakassia.

In 2007, he joined the Communist Party of the Russian Federation.

In 2009, he joined the Komsomol in Russia and served as the first secretary of the Khakass branch of the Komsomol until 2012.

In 2014, he was elected first Secretary of the Committee of the Abakan city branch of the Communist party.

Since 2010, he has been a member of the Bureau of the Committee of the Khakass regional branch of the Communist Party of the Russian Federation.

In 2010, he graduated from the University with a degree in public law. He continued his postgraduate studies with a degree in Theory and History of State and Law, History of Legal Doctrines.

Since 2011, he has been working as a legal adviser at the newspaper «Pravda Khakassia».

In 2011 head of the legal service of the Khakass regional office Communist Party of the Russian Federation.

From 2011 to 2013, he was a voting member of the Election Commission of the Republic of Khakassia.

From 2013 to 2018, he served as a deputy of the City Council Abakana.

In 2014, he was elected First Secretary of the Committee of the Abakan local branch of the Communist Party of the Russian Federation. Since 2015, he has been the Second secretary of the Khakass branch of the Communist Party of the Russian Federation

In March 2018, he was elected First Secretary of the Committee (leader) of the Khakass Republican Branch of the Communist party.

In 2018, Konovalov participated in both the gubernatorial and parliamentary elections. He ran for the Supreme Council from the 4th single-mandate constituency. On September 9, he was elected to the Supreme Council of Khakassia and simultaneously entered the second round of gubernatorial election.

From 9 September to 15 November 2018 year - member of the parliament of Khakassia.

== 2018 and 2023 Gubernatorial campaign ==
The results of the first (left) and second (right) rounds by territorial election commissions. Valentin Konovalov Viktor Zimin

On the website Pravda 19 passed a vote on the support of the national candidate of the Communist Party. About 5,000 people voted. The voting ended on June 16, 2018.

The first secretary of the Communist Party of the Republic of Khakassia, Valentin Konovalov, received 46%, deputy to the Supreme Council, Oleg Ivanov, received 34%. The Communist Party decided to nominate Konovalov to the post of the Head of the Republic of Khakassia. On 21 June 2018, Valentin Konovalov was nominated as a candidate for Head of Khakassia from the Communist party.

The initial election took place on 9 September, with Konovalov gaining 44% of the vote against incumbent Viktor Zimin, who received 32% of the vote. Since no candidate won more than 50% of the vote, a runoff election was scheduled for 23 September between Konovalov and Zimin. Zimin withdrew his candidacy on 2 October, and the third-place candidate from the first round of voting, Andrey Filyagin, took Zimin's place in the runoff election. Filyagin also withdrew his candidacy. Alexander Myakhar who took the fourth place in the first round had to participate in the second round, but he also refused to participate in the elections, and therefore the vote was postponed to 11 November. As there were no other candidates, in accordance with the Russian legislation, the second round had to be uncontested. Only Valentin Konovalov had to participate in the voting, and the voters had to vote "for" or "against" him. To win Konovalov had to gain more than 50% of the vote.

On 11 October 2018, the Chairman of Republican Election Commission Alexander Chumanin said that the election Commission of the Republic of Khakassia will appeal to the Supreme court of Khakassia Republic with a request to cancel registration on election of Valentin Konovalov. The Commission received a submission from the Prosecutor's office, which states that when submitting documents from Konovalov was, first, incorrectly stated the name of the branch of the party: in the documents it is called "Communist party of the Russian Federation-Khakass regional branch of the Communist party", while in the register of legal entities the party is registered as "Khakass regional branch of the Communist party of the Russian Federation". And secondly, according to Prosecutor's office, documents of party conference weren't certified by the head of regional office (which Konovalov is), and the presiding Secretary who conducted party conference.

The actions of the Republican Election Commission have caused criticism, including Central Election Commission Chairwoman Ella Pamfilova, who said that "the Republican Commission has sued itself to actually cancel the upcoming second round of election", and that "irreparable damage to the entire electoral process in the region may be caused". Under the law, it is possible to withdraw a registered candidate within 10 days, except in cases where there are newly discovered circumstances. Valentin Konovalov filed a counterclaim against the decision of the election Commission.

On 12 October, session of the Supreme Court of Khakassia, where the judge Valery Solovyev has postponed consideration of the claim for 15 October.

On 13 October, the interim Head of Khakassia Mikhail Razvozhayev, said he personally requested the Election Commission to withdraw the case from the Supreme Court to cancel the registration of Valentin Konovalov.

On 15 October, the Republican Election Commission decided to withdraw its claim from the Supreme Court to cancel the registration. The Supreme court of Khakassia also stopped consideration of the claim of the candidate for the head of Khakassia from the party of growth Alexander Mekhar to cancel the registration of Valentin Konovalov on the basis of the decision of the Election Commission, which recognized one of the videos of the Communist party violating the law. On 15 October, Alexander Myakhar announced the withdrawal of his claim.

On 11 November 2018, in the second round of elections, gaining more than 57% of the vote, Konovalov was elected Head of Republic.

His win coincided with the elections of Sergei Furgal and Vladimir Sipyagin, who also defeated United Russia incumbents in other regions. Furgal has since been imprisoned, and Sipyagin resigned.

United Russia ran State Duma member Sergey Sokol to challenge Konovolov's re-election bid. However, after polls suggested the party would once again perform poorly, Sokol withdrew from the race. Sokol denied that the poor polling was the reason for his withdrawal, citing health reasons for his decision.

Konovalov was subsequently comfortably re-elected in the first round of the 2023 Khakas head election, garnering 63.14% of the vote.

== Head of Khakassia ==
=== Inauguration ===
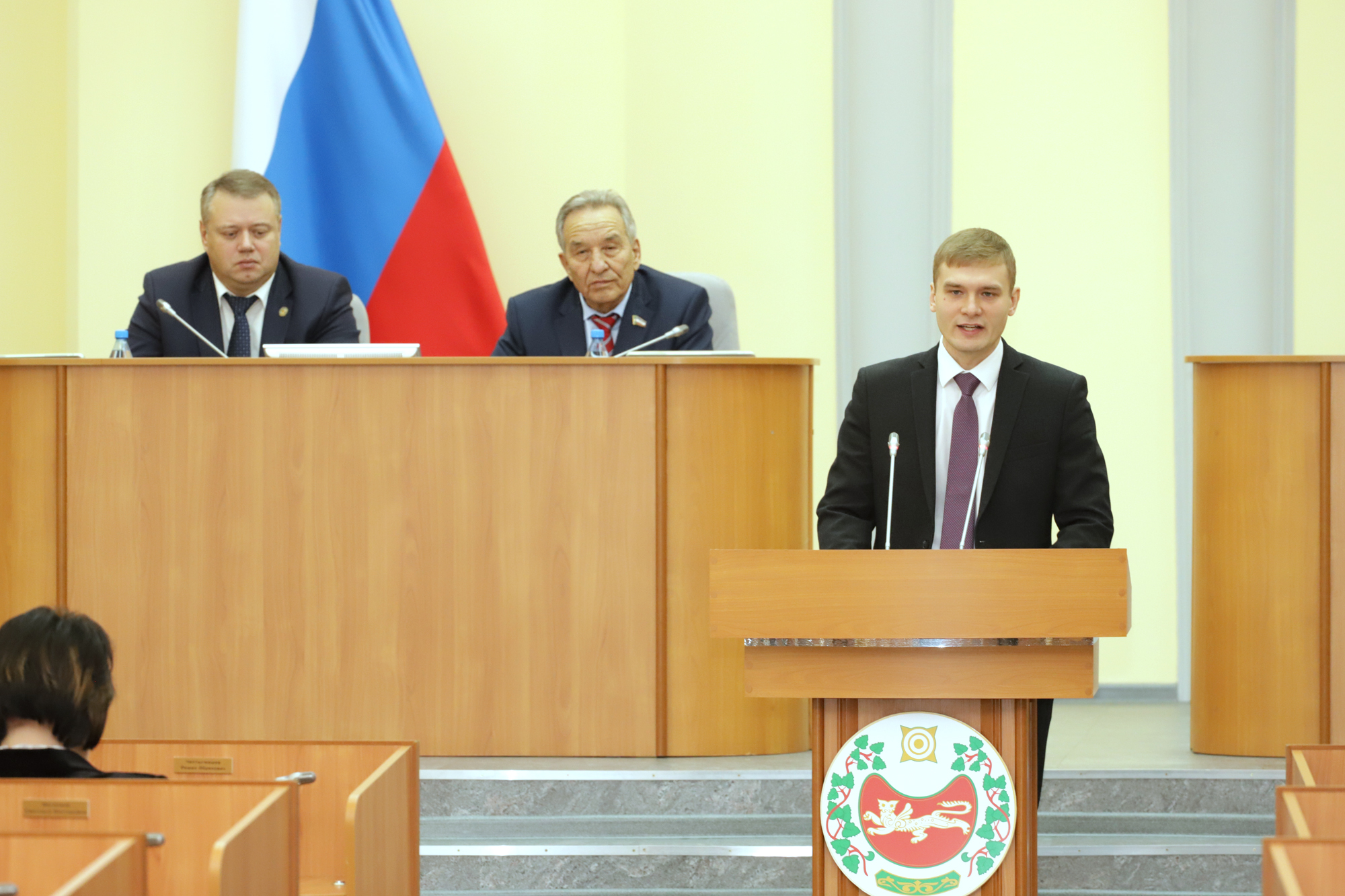
Inauguration of Valentin Konovalov, November 15, 2018

On 15 November 2018, Valentin Konovalov took the oath before the deputies of the Supreme Council of the Republic and judges of the Supreme Court of the Republic.

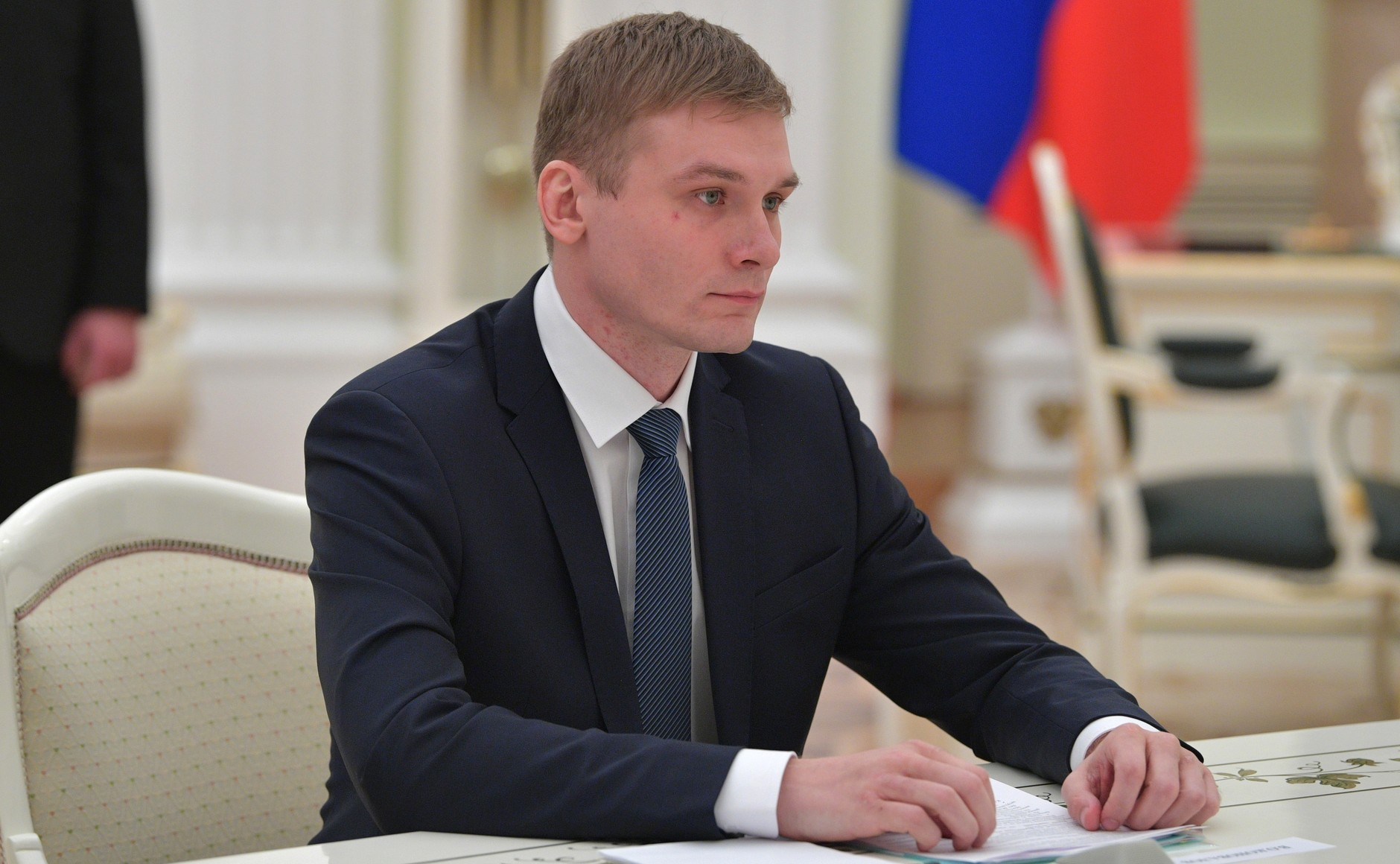
During the meeting with President Vladimir Putin, December 27, 2018

=== Government formation ===
The new government of Khakassia promised to make a coalition. It will be formed not on the principle of party affiliation, but on the basis of the professionalism of applicants for Ministerial posts. The formation will take place on a competitive basis. Probably, in addition to the Communist and Liberal Democratic parties (these parties agreed on coalitions in the three regions where the gubernatorial elections won their candidates) will be non-party and representatives of other parties, Konovalov did not rule out that the government may include members of United Russia.

Immediately after the inauguration, Konovalov held a meeting of the regional government, at which he dismissed the remaining Ministers and their deputies (13 high-ranking officials resigned from the government the day before). On the same day, Konovalov made his first appointment. Deputy of the Supreme Council of Khakassia, from United Russia Andrey Asochakov took the position of the First Deputy Head of Republic. Konovalov said he would coordinate finance and communication with the Russian federal government. Secretary of the Tula Regional Committee of the Communist party and mayor of Donskoy in the Tula Region Bogdan Pavlenko took the post of Deputy Head of Republic. Konovalov said Pavlenko would direct the apparatus of his administration and restructure the local government.

=== Tenure ===
Konovalov has described tackling corruption as the focus of his governorship.

On economic policy, he has taken steps to implement elements of a planned economy.

Konovalov responded to the COVID-19 pandemic in Russia by issuing a stay-at-home order. Restrictions were gradually lifted in the following months.

His foreign policy has centred on aiming to increase trade and tourism cooperation with Asian countries, particularly fellow socialist Vietnam and China.

As Governor, Konovalov was required to enable the mobilisation effort during the invasion of Ukraine. The United States added Konovalov to the Specially Designated Nationals and Blocked Persons List in February 2023, describing him as being involved in the "implementation of Russian operations and aggression against Ukraine” and "calling Russian citizens to fight in the war." For similar reasons, he was also placed on the sanctions list of Ukraine in April 2023.

Despite winning re-election in September 2023, his party lost the parliamentary election. This was because even though the communists won the most votes in the party-list portion of the election, United Russia won almost all seats in the first past-the-post system portion in single-member constituencies.

In July 2025, Konovalov vetoed a bill on municipal reform pushed by United Russia which would have centralised control over municipal officials. In doing so, he took the side of protestors in Khakassia and neighbouring regions where United Russia attempted similar reforms.

== Personal life ==
He has two daughters and a son.

== Electoral history ==
Accurate as of prior to the 2023 elections

| Election | Political result | Candidate | Party | Votes | % |
|---|---|---|---|---|---|
| First Secretary of the Communist Party in Khakassia election, 2018; Electorate: 30; Turnout: 27, but results take abstentions into account (90%) | CPRF; Majority: 23 (76.67%) | ✓ (for Konovalov) | CPRF | 26 | 86.67% |
| First Secretary of the Communist Party in Khakassia election, 2018; Electorate: 30; Turnout: 27, but results take abstentions into account (90%) | CPRF; Majority: 23 (76.67%) | ✗ (against Konovalov) | | 1 | 3.33% |
| 2018 Communist Party nomination for Head of Republic | CPRF | Valentin Konovalov | CPRF | unopposed | |
| 2018 Khakassia Supreme Council election in 4th single-mandate constituency Turnout: 4,989 (33.27%) | CPRF; Majority: 362 (7.26%) | Valentin Konovalov | CPRF | 1,550 | 31.07 |
| 2018 Khakassia Supreme Council election in 4th single-mandate constituency Turnout: 4,989 (33.27%) | CPRF; Majority: 362 (7.26%) | Andrey Aploshkin | United Russia | 1,188 | 23.81 |
| 2018 Khakassia Supreme Council election in 4th single-mandate constituency Turnout: 4,989 (33.27%) | CPRF; Majority: 362 (7.26%) | Vitaly Kuzmin | LDPR | 611 | 12.25 |
| 2018 Khakassia Supreme Council election in 4th single-mandate constituency Turnout: 4,989 (33.27%) | CPRF; Majority: 362 (7.26%) | Alexey Kicheev | Independent | 586 | 11.75 |
| 2018 Khakassia Supreme Council election in 4th single-mandate constituency Turnout: 4,989 (33.27%) | CPRF; Majority: 362 (7.26%) | Vyacheslav Novosyolov | A Just Russia | 414 | 8.30 |
| 2018 Khakassia Supreme Council election in 4th single-mandate constituency Turnout: 4,989 (33.27%) | CPRF; Majority: 362 (7.26%) | Valery Safonov | CPCR | 302 | 6.05 |
| 2018 Khakassia head election (1st round); Turnout: 159,670 (41.77%) | CPRF; Majority: 19,782 (12.39%) | Valentin Konovalov | CPRF | 71,553 | 44.81 |
| 2018 Khakassia head election (1st round); Turnout: 159,670 (41.77%) | CPRF; Majority: 19,782 (12.39%) | Viktor Zimin | United Russia | 51,771 | 32.42 |
| 2018 Khakassia head election (1st round); Turnout: 159,670 (41.77%) | CPRF; Majority: 19,782 (12.39%) | Andrey Filyagin | A Just Russia | 17,930 | 11.22 |
| 2018 Khakassia head election (1st round); Turnout: 159,670 (41.77%) | CPRF; Majority: 19,782 (12.39%) | Alexander Myakhar | Party of Growth | 10,551 | 6.61 |
| 2018 Khakassia head election (2nd round); Turnout: 176,137 (45.72%) | CPRF; Majority: 28,907 (16.48%) | ✓ (for Konovalov) | CPRF | 101,405 | 57.57 |
| 2018 Khakassia head election (2nd round); Turnout: 176,137 (45.72%) | CPRF; Majority: 28,907 (16.48%) | ✗ (against Konovalov) | | 72,498 | 41.16 |

Party political offices
| Preceded by Igor Chunchel | Communist Party nominee for Head of Khakassia; 2018 | Most recent |
| Preceded by Nikolay Bozykov | First Secretary of the Communist Party in Khakassia; 2018–present | Incumbent |
Political offices
| Preceded by Viktor Zimin; Mikhail Razvozhayev (interim) | Head of the Republic of Khakassia; 2018–present | Incumbent |
