= Aleksey Lebed =

Russian politician (1955–2019)

- Алексей Лебедь
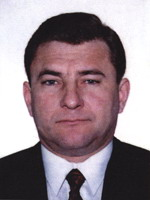

2nd Head of the Republic of Khakassia
- In office 8 January 1997 – 14 January 2009
- Preceded by: Yevgeny Smirnov
- Succeeded by: Viktor Zimin

Personal details
- Born: Aleksey Ivanovich Lebed; April 14, 1955 Novocherkassk, Rostov Oblast, Russian SFSR, Soviet Union
- Died: April 27, 2019 (aged 64) Moscow, Russia
- Resting place: Khovanskoye Cemetery
- Party: United Russia (2005–2011)
- Spouse: Yelizaveta Lebed
- Children: 3
- Education: Ryazan Airborne Command School

Military service
- Allegiance: Soviet Union→Russia
- Branch/service: Airborne Forces
- Years of service: 1976–1996
- Rank: Colonel
- Unit: 300th Guards Parachute-Landing Regiment
- Awards: Medal "For Courage"

Aleksey Ivanovich Lebed (Russian: Алексей Иванович Лебедь; 14 April 1955 – 27 April 2019) was a Russian politician and military officer who served as professional officer with the Soviet and Russian Airborne Forces, like his more prominent older brother, the late Alexander Lebed. After quitting military service in 1995 with the rank of colonel, he was elected chairman of the government of Khakassia Administrative Republic. He came to the post in 1997, and was re-elected in 2000. Shortly after he came to power in 1997, the transmitter of the Sayansk television and radio company was cut off. Station chief Veniamin Striga said Lebed was responsible. In 2006 criminal charges were brought against Lebed related to claims of abuse of power. In 2009 Viktor Zimin took Lebed's position as the head of the government of Khakassia.

Aleksey Lebed died on 27 April 2019 in Moscow, at the age of 64. He is buried at the Khovanskoye Cemetery in Moscow next to his wife Elizaveta.
