= Aleksei Chaly =

Russian activist (born 1961)

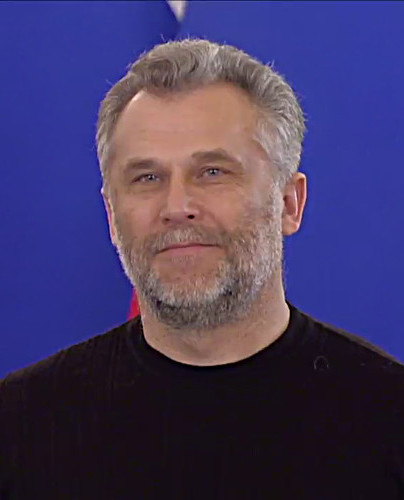

Deputy of the Legislative Assembly of Sevastopol
- In office September 15, 2014 – September 8, 2019
- Constituency: Sevastopol

Chairman of the Legislative Assembly of Sevastopol
- In office September 22, 2014 – March 22, 2016

Acting governor of Sevastopol
- In office 1 April – 14 April 2014
- President: Vladimir Putin
- Preceded by: Position established
- Succeeded by: Sergey Menyaylo

Personal details
- Born: 13 June 1961 (age 65) Moscow, Russian SFSR, Soviet Union
- Party: United Russia
- Education: Sevastopol National Technical University
- Profession: CEO and CTO

Aleksei Mikhailovich Chaly (Russian: Алексей Михайлович Чалый; born 13 June 1961) is a Russian political and public figure, and a businessman. He was the deputy of the Legislative Assembly of Sevastopol from 2014 to 2019.

He became Chairman of the coordinating Council for the organization of the Sevastopol City Administration for ensuring the city's vital activity in February 2014, amidst after the resignation of Volodymyr Yatsuba, the mayor appointed by Viktor Yanukovych. With Chaly as mayor, Sevastopol participated in the March 2014 referendum. On 1 April 2014, he was appointed as the acting governor of Sevastopol. On 14 April, he was replaced by Sergey Menyaylo.

== Biography ==
Chaly was born on 13 June 1961 in Moscow to students of the Moscow Power Engineering Institute. Parents: inventor and scientist Michail Chaly, mother Alevtina Chalaya, Candidate of Engineering, university professor. Grandson to Soviet vice-admiral Vasily Chaly, hero of the Great Patriotic War, Commander-In-Chief of the Black Sea Squadron (1956–1961). The family moved to Sevastopol, Ukrainian SSR when he was one year old. Chaly graduated from the Sevastopol National Technical University. Since 1987 he has been the head of "Tavrida Electric", producing switchgear and anti-wreck technology. At the moment of political crisis in Ukraine in 2014 he had Russian citizenship.

He was involved with the restoration of the memorials of the World War II, producing the documentary series "Sevastopol Tales". In 2011 he received the international award "For faith and fidelity" as a symbol of recognition of his contribution to the Motherland.

== During the Crimean crisis ==
On 23 February 2014, a meeting of citizens opposed to the Euromaidan movement that ousted the Ukrainian government from power in Kyiv led to Chaly being proclaimed as "mayor" of Sevastopol. The Sevastopol City Council handed power to Chaly on 24 February, following the resignation of Volodymyr Yatsuba as the city administrator appointed by the president of Ukraine (at the time the city had no elected mayor).

On 26 February, Chaly declared that Sevastopol would not submit to orders of the acting leader of the Ukrainian home office, Arsen Avakov. Simultaneously, he invited officers of the officially disbanded Berkut riot police unit to the city. He said that they could become a basis for future defence groups in the city.

Chaly visited the Kremlin in Moscow on 18 March 2014 to sign the Treaty on Accession of the Republic of Crimea to Russia together with Russian president Vladimir Putin and Crimean prime minister Sergey Aksyonov.

In March 2014, the Security Service of Ukraine announced an investigation into Chaly for allegedly steering some ₴23.9 million from his charitable organisation to bankroll anti-Ukraine activity.

On 1 April 2014, he was appointed as acting governor of Sevastopol City by Russia and occupied this position till 14 April 2014, when he resigned and was replaced by Sergey Menyaylo.

=== Sanctions ===
Chaly was sanctioned by the British government in 2014 as a result of the annexation of Crimea.
