= Krasnoyarsk State Pedagogical University =

Public university in Russia

Krasnoyarsk State Pedagogical University named after V. P. Astafyev
- Russian: Красноярский государственный педагогический университет имени В. П. Астафьева
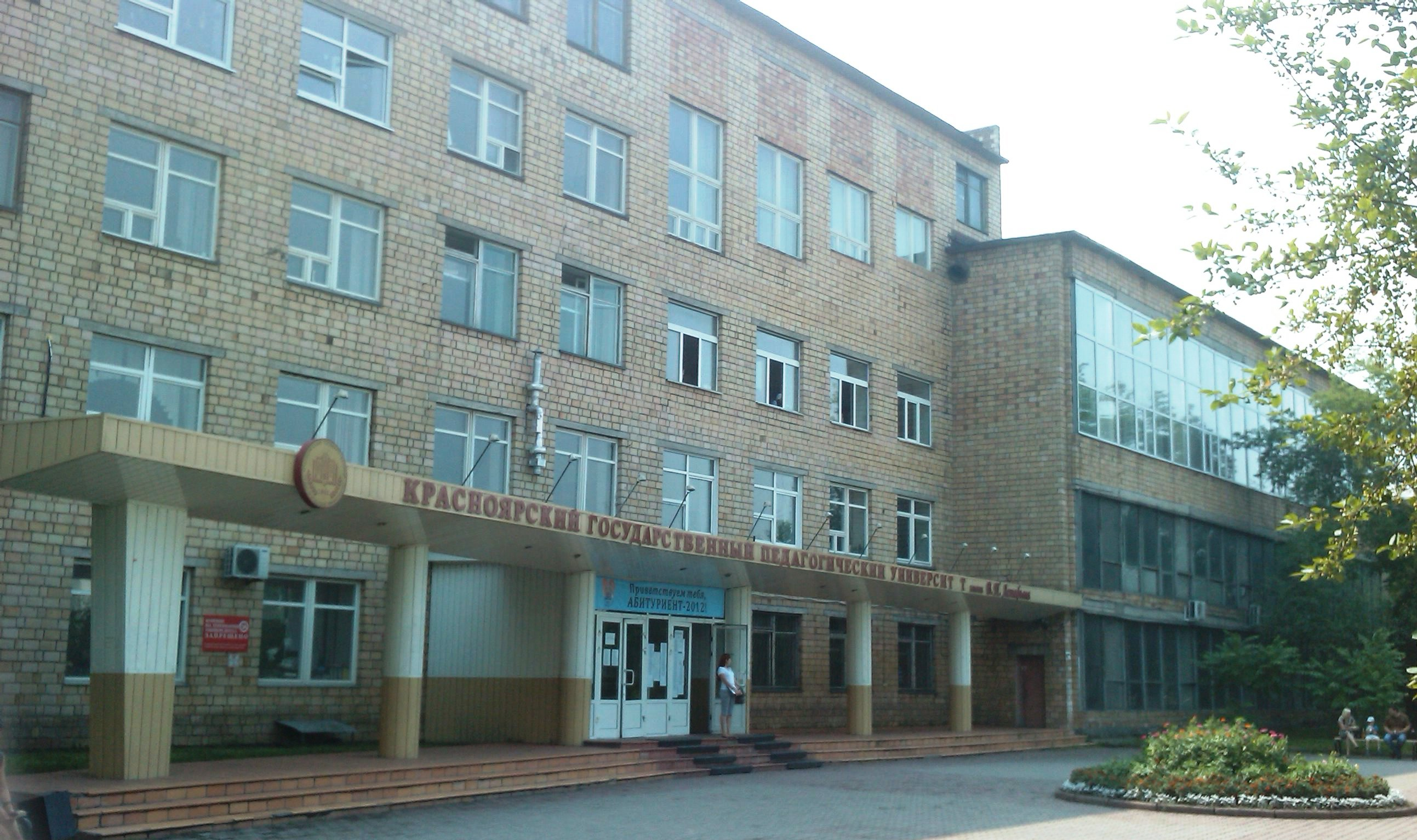
- Type: public
- Established: 1932
- Location: Krasnoyarsk, Krasnoyarsk Krai, Russia; 56°00′43″N 92°51′36″E
- Campus: urban
- Website: www.kspu.ru

Krasnoyarsk State Pedagogical University named after V. P. Astafyev (KSPU) (Russian: Красноярский государственный педагогический университет имени В. П. Астафьева) is a public university located in the city of Krasnoyarsk, Russia, one of the oldest and largest in Siberia. Founded in 1932 as a pedagogical institute. Received university status in 1993. Today it is one of the largest universities in Krasnoyarsk along with the Siberian Federal University and the Reshetnev Siberian State University of Science and Technology.

== History ==
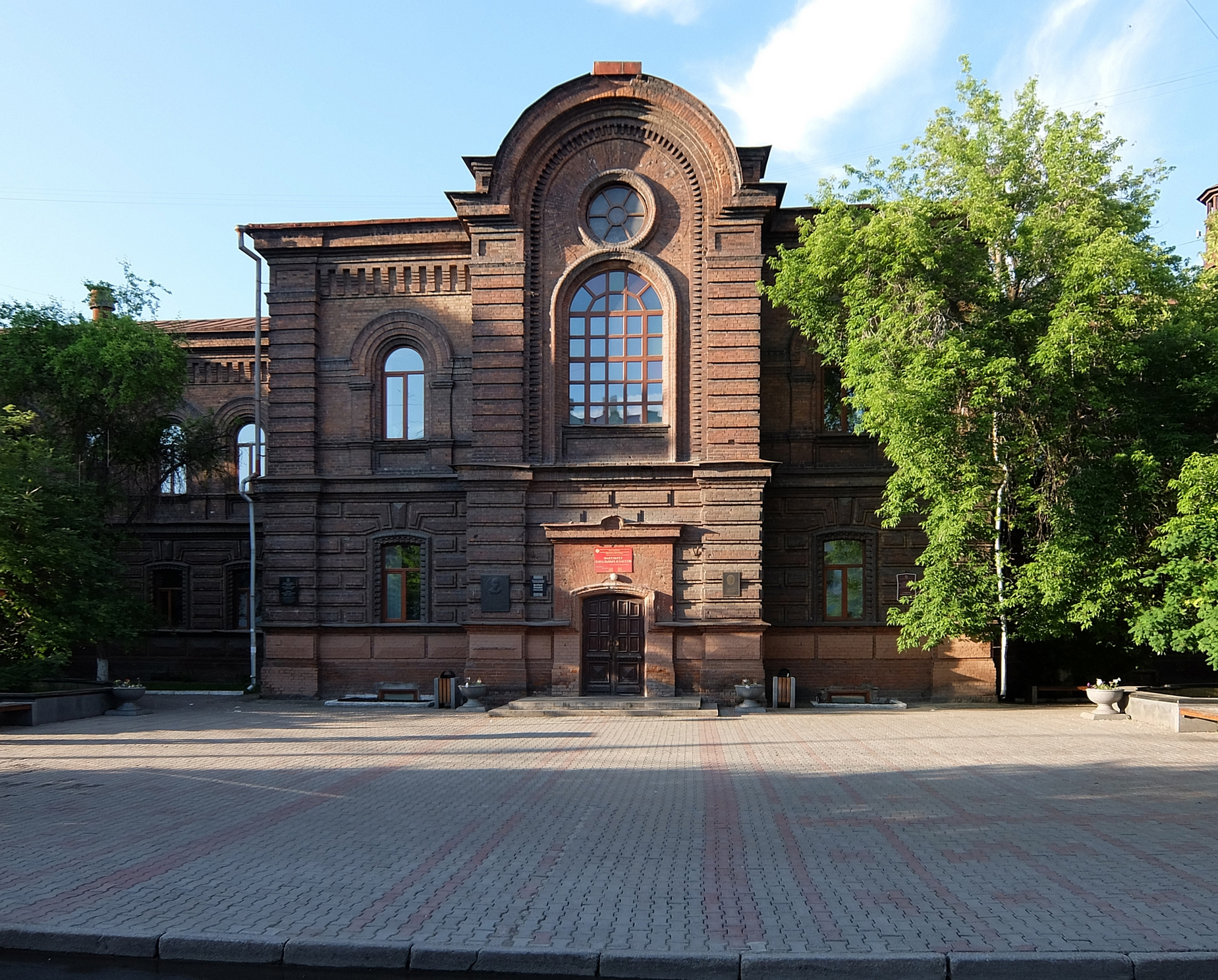
The building of the former women's gymnasium in Krasnoyarsk

KSPU was founded in 1932 by the Decree of the Council of People's Commissars of the RSFSR No. 289 as the Krasnoyarsk State Pedagogical Institute. The institute had four departments, which accepted 118 students, as well as 50 students of the working faculty. It was located in the building of the former women's gymnasium. Its historical predecessor is considered to be the Krasnoyarsk Institute of Public Education, which existed in Krasnoyarsk in 1920–1924 and was attached to the Irkutsk Institute of Public Education.

In 1935, a correspondence department was opened at KSPI. The Teachers' Institute was also created in the structure of the KSPI.

In 1982, KSPI was awarded the Order of the Badge of Honour. In December 1994, the institute was transformed into the Krasnoyarsk State Pedagogical University.

In 2005, the university entered the top 100 universities in Russia. It was also awarded the European Quality of Education medal.

The scientists of KSPU achieved the greatest success in archeology, zoology, history, Russian language, pedagogy, sociology, physics, chemistry and philosophy.

== Literature ==
- Большой энциклопедический словарь Красноярского края [Great Encyclopedic Dictionary of the Krasnoyarsk Krai] / гл. ред. А. П. Статейнов. Красноярск : Буква С, 2010. Т. 2 : [Административно-территориальное деление. Населенные пункты. Предприятия и организации]. pp. 190–191. 515 p. (in Russian).
