= Dmitry Ovsyannikov =

Russian politician

- Дмитрий Овсянников
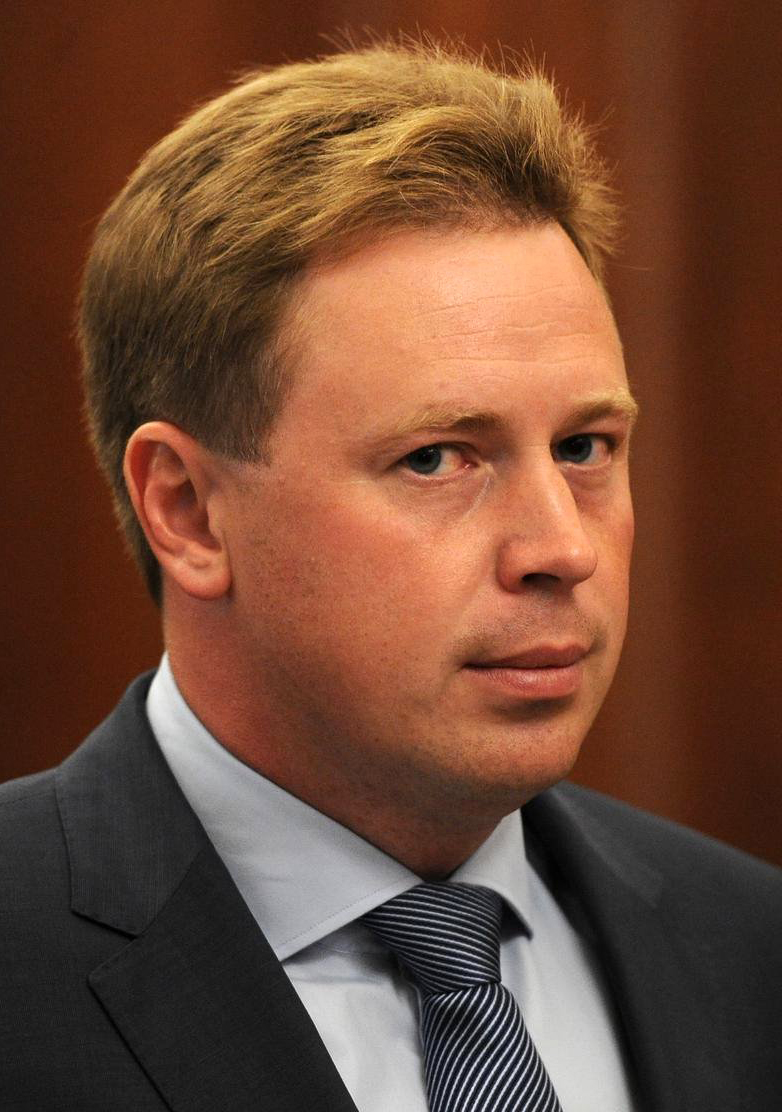
- Ovsyannikov in 2016

Governor of Sevastopol
- In office 18 September 2017 – 11 July 2019
- President: Vladimir Putin
- Preceded by: Sergey Menyaylo
- Succeeded by: Mikhail Razvozhayev

Deputy minister of Industry and Trade of the Russian Federation
- In office 23 December 2015 – 28 July 2016

Personal details
- Born: Dmitry Vladimirovich Ovsiannikov; 21 February 1977 (age 49) Omsk, Russian SFSR, Soviet Union
- Party: Independent (since 2020); United Russia (until 2020)

Dmitry Vladimirovich Ovsyannikov (Ovsiannikov (Note: Used in British passport); Russian: Дмитрий Владимирович Овсянников; born 21 February 1977) is a Russian politician who served as Governor of Sevastopol from 18 September 2017 to 11 July 2019. He is considered a protege of Sergey Chemezov.

== Biography ==
Dmitry Ovsiannikov was born in Omsk, Omsk Oblast, in Siberia on 21 February 1977. In August 2001, at the age of 24, he entered the Russian State staff reserve and was appointed Federal Inspector in Kirov Oblast.

He served as Deputy Minister of Industry and Commerce of the Russian Government between 23 December 2015 and 28 July 2016, when he was made the so-called Governor of Sevastopol following the resignation of Sergey Menyaylo. He was later elected as a United Russia candidate to the office in September 2017, receiving 71% of the vote (voter turnout in this election was 34%).

On 11 July 2019, Ovsiannikov resigned from his post as Governor of Sevastopol.

On January 27, 2023, he received British citizenship based on the fact that his father was born in the United Kingdom and is its citizen.

== Controversies ==
=== Sanctions ===
The European Union imposed sanctions on Dmitry Ovsiannikov as a result of his participation in unrecognized (by the EU and others) sham elections in Russia-occupied Crimea. Since then, the EU sanctions have been lifted on the order of the EU Court of Justice due to him no longer occupying the position of the mayor of illegally annexed Sevastopol. He was sanctioned by the UK government in 2017 in relation to the Russo-Ukrainian War.

=== Criminal Case ===
On 31 January 2024, he was arrested in London by the UK’s National Crime Agency allegedly for "circumventing sanctions" to the value of £65,000 and holding cash of some £77,500 with a court date on 20 February. He was removed from the EU sanctions list on 7 February 2023 by the EU court, citing the fact that the position of Governor was one he no longer held. On 20 February, he was released from arrest on bail with a ban on leaving the country. Consideration of the case on the merits was scheduled for 10 March 2025. On 9 April, he was convicted on the charges and sentenced to 40 months' imprisonment.

== Personal life ==
Ovsyannikov is married and has two children.
