= Yevgeny Smirnov (politician) =

Russian politician (born 1937)

- Евгений Смирнов
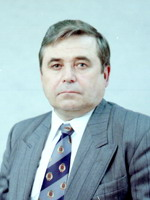

Prime Minister of Khakassia
- In office 5 February 1992 – 8 January 1997
- Succeeded by: Aleksey Lebed

Personal details
- Born: Yevgeny Aleksandrovich Smirnov; 15 November 1937 (age 88) Raiki, Russian SFSR, Soviet Union
- Party: Communist Party of the Russian Federation
- Other political affiliations: Our Home - Russia

Yevgeny Aleksandrovich Smirnov (Russian: Евгений Александрович Смирнов; born 15 November 1937), is a Russian politician who served as Prime Minister of Khakassia from 1992 to 1997.

== Biography ==
Yevgeny Smirnov was born on 15 November 1937, in Raiki, Porkhovsky District, Leningrad Oblast (present day Pskov Oblast).

After graduating from the Kharkov Polytechnic Institute in 1960, he was sent to the Novo-Kramatorsk Machine-Building Plant as a design engineer.

In 1961, he was seconded to a unit of the USSR Ministry of Energy and Electrification and sent to the construction of the Bratsk Hydroelectric Power Station. He worked in the USSR Ministry of Energy from 1961 to 1982 on the construction of the Bratsk, Krasnoyarsk and Sayano-Shushenskaya hydroelectric power stations.

In 1980, he was elected secretary of the party committee of the Krasnoyarskgesstroy management, then secretary of the Sayanogorsk CPSU Civil Committee, and in 1985 transferred to head of the construction department of the Khakass regional committee of the CPSU. From 1988 to February 1992, he worked in the Khakass Regional Executive Committee.

On 6 February 1992, Smirnov was appointed Prime Minister of Khakassia

On 3 December 1996, Smirnov ran and lost reelection to Aleksey Lebed. He left office on 8 January 1997.

Since 1998, he was the chairman of the Federation of Trade Unions of the Republic of Khakassia.
