= Viktor Zimin (politician) =

Russian politician (1962–2020)

- Виктор Зимин
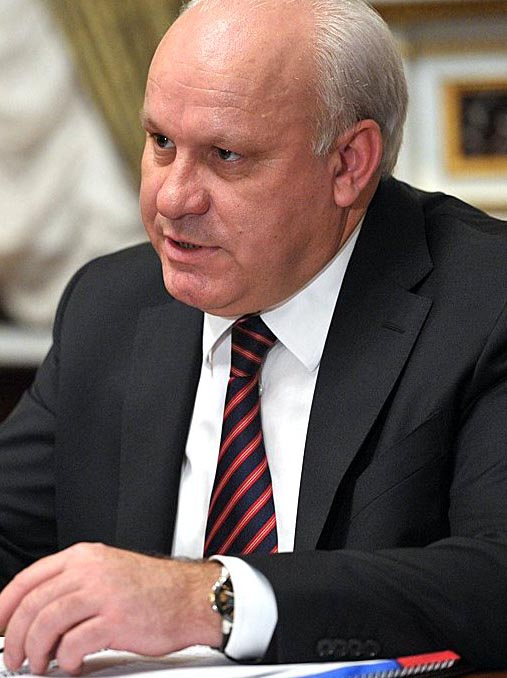
- Zimin in 2013

3rd Head of the Republic of Khakassia
- In office 15 January 2009 – 3 October 2018
- Preceded by: Aleksey Lebed
- Succeeded by: Mikhail Razvozhayev (interim); Valentin Konovalov

Personal details
- Born: 23 August 1962 Askizsky District, Khakas AO, Russian SFSR, Soviet Union
- Died: 23 November 2020 (aged 58) Moscow, Russian Federation
- Party: United Russia
- Profession: Politician

Viktor Mikhaylovich Zimin (Russian: Ви́ктор Миха́йлович Зи́мин: 23 August 1962 – 23 November 2020) was a Russian politician.

== Biography ==
He served as Chairman of the Government of the Republic of Khakassia, a federal subject of Russia, from 2009 until 2018. He came into power after Aleksey Lebed left office. His father was Russian, his mother was of German descent.

In 2018, Zimin lost his bid for re-election to a third term in the first round of voting and declined to participate in the second, amid low polling.

He died in Moscow on 23 November 2020, after contracting COVID-19.
