= Mikhail Razvozhayev =

Russian statesman and politician (born 1979)

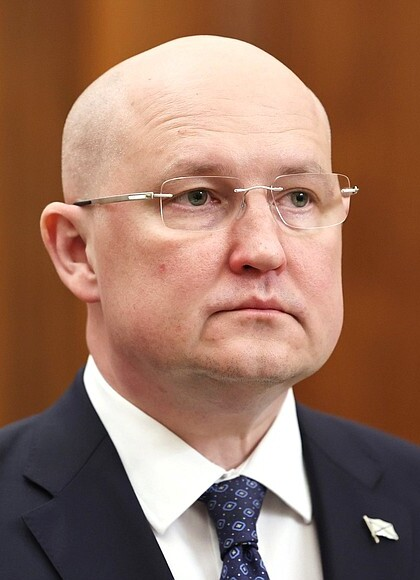
- Razvogaev in 2025

Governor of Sevastopol
- Incumbent
- Assumed office 2 October 2020
- President: Vladimir Putin
- Preceded by: Dmitry Ovsyannikov

Deputy minister of the Russian Federation for North Caucasus Affairs
- In office 1 October 2014 – 3 October 2018

Personal details
- Born: Mikhail Vladimirovich Razvozhayev; 12 September 1979 (age 47) Krasnoyarsk, Russian SFSR, Soviet Union
- Party: United Russia
- Children: 2
- Education: Krasnoyarsk State Pedagogical University Russian Presidential Academy of National Economy and Public Administration
- Profession: historian

Mikhail Vladimirovich Razvozhayev (Russian: Михаил Владимирович Развожаев; born 12 September 1979) is a Russian statesman and politician, governor of Sevastopol since 2 October 2020.

Razvozhayev was the acting head of the Republic of Khakassia from 3 October to 15 November 2018. He also worked as the Deputy Minister of the Russian Federation for North Caucasus Affairs from 1 October 2014 to 3 October 2018. He was the head of the executive committee of the All-Russian Popular Front, member of the Central Head of ONF from 17 December 2018 to 11 July 2019.

== Biography ==
Born on 30 December 1980 in the city of Krasnoyarsk.

In 2002, he graduated from the History Department of the Krasnoyarsk State Pedagogical University.

He started his career while studying at the university in February 2002 in the trade union organization of students of the Krasnoyarsk State Pedagogical University.

Since April 2003, he has held public service positions in the administration of the Governor of the Krasnoyarsk Territory: first Governor Alexander Khloponin and since 2010 Lev Kuznetsov.

Since October 2008, he has worked in senior positions in the administration of the Governor of the Krasnoyarsk Kray. He was a consultant, head of the press service of the regional government, deputy head of the press service department of the head of the region, press secretary to the governor and deputy head of the Information policy Department.

From August 2012 to July 2014 he was deputy head of the administration of the governor of Krasnoyarsk Krai from May 2014. Viktor Tolokonsky was acting as governor at the time.

Since 1 October 2014, he was promoted as the Deputy Minister of the Russian Federation for North Caucasus Affairs. He was trained in the first stream of the Higher School of Public Administration of the Russian Academy of National Economy and Public Administration under the President of the Russian Federation., created by order of the Academy No. 02-573 of 19 November 2013.

On 3 October 2018, Russian President Vladimir Putin appointed Razvozhayev as the interim head of the Republic of Khakassia after the resignation of Viktor Zimin, who failed to win the first round of elections on 9 September and refused to continue the fight. Almost immediately after the appointment, he promised to resolve the personal conflict of two candidates for governors – participants in the second round of elections: Communist Party representative Valentin Konovalov, and Aleksandr Myakhar from the Party of Growth.

On the air of the Russia 1 television channel, Razvozhaev asked the republic's election commission to withdraw the lawsuit from the Supreme Court of Khakassia to unregister the candidate for governor from Konovalov.

On 27 October 2018, Razvozhaev announced that he would be ready to go to new elections if the round scheduled for 11 November was declared invalid. However, residents of the republic voted for the deputy of the Abakan City Council from the Communist Party and elected Konovalov as the Head of the Republic of Khakassia.

On 29 November 2018, Razvozhayev was elected to the Central Headquarters of the All-Russian Popular Front.

From 17 December 2018, to July 2019, he was the head of the executive committee of the All-Russian Popular Front.

=== Governor of Sevastopol ===
On 11 July 2019, with a decree of Russian President Vladimir Putin, Razvozhayev was appointed as the interim Governor of Sevastopol. Previously, this post was held by Dmitry Ovsyannikov, who resigned at his own request.

On 12 July 2019 Razvozhayev dismissed the Government of Sevastopol. The Government will continue its work until the formation of a new Government.

Direct elections of the head of the region were held on 13 September 2020

On 30 September 2019, Razvozhayev formed the new composition of the Government of Sevastopol. The government included seven deputy governors: Vladimir Bazarov, Aleksander Kulagin, Maria Litovko, Aleksey Parikin, Svetlana Pirogova, Denis Solodovnikov, and the ex-Senator of the Federation Council from Sevastopol Olga Timofeyeva.

On 25 October 2019 at the conference of the party "United Russia", Razvozhayev was approved as secretary of the Sevastopol regional branch. This decision was supported by the majority at the party conference of the Sevastopol branch of the party.

== Family ==
Razvozhayev is married and has two children.

== Sanctions ==
In January 2020, he was sanctioned by the European Union, the United Kingdom and the United States after he was appointed as the governor of Sevastopol.

In July 2022, following the Russian invasion of Ukraine, he was included in the sanctions list of the United Kingdom before being dropped from the list in August 2022 and re-added in the asset freeze list in September 2022.

For similar reasons, he has been included in the sanctions list of Australia, Canada, Monaco, Switzerland and Ukraine.
