= Sevastopol National Technical University =

University in Sevastopol, Crimea

- Севастопольский національний технологічний університет
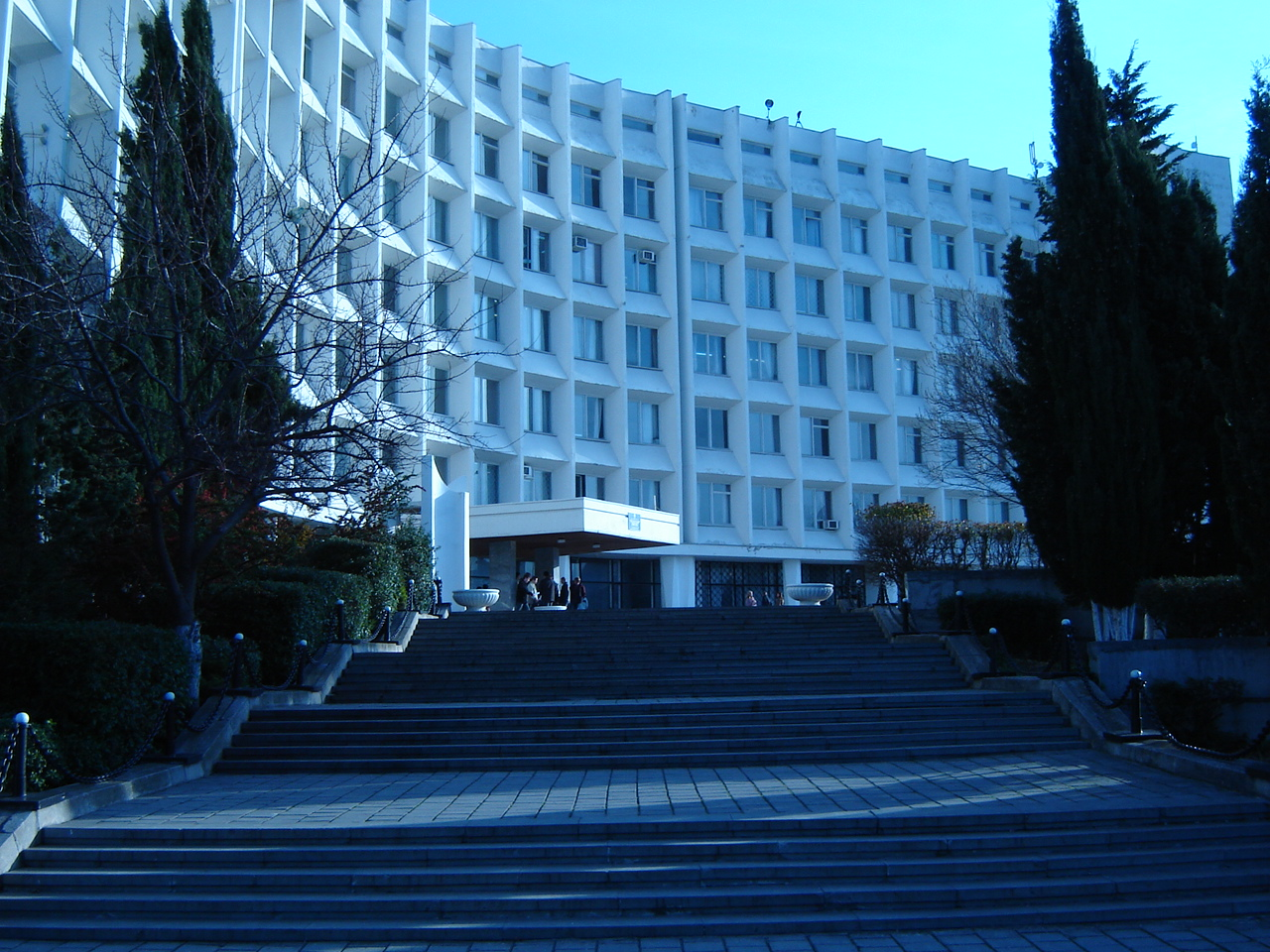
- Sevastopol National Technical University
- Established: 1951
- Location: 33 Universitets'ka St 299053, Sevastopol, Crimea; 44.5945°N 33.4770°E

Sevastopol National Technical University (Ukrainian: Севастопольський національний технічний університет, romanized: Sevastopolskyy natsionalnyy tekhnichnyy universytet), formerly known as the Sevastopol Engineering Institute, is a university in Sevastopol, Crimea.

== History ==
Sevastopol Instrument Engineering Institute was founded in 1951 as a Sevastopol branch of Nikolayev Shipbuilding Institute (order of the Minister of Higher Education of the USSR No. 489 of 9 October 1951).

In June 1960, a Sevastopol branch of Odessa Polytechnic Institute (SB OPI) was created by Resolution of the Council of Ministers of the Ukrainian SSR No. 968 on the basis of the Sevastopol branch of NSI.

A significant event for Sevastopol and the recognition of the contribution of the research and educational staff became the opening at the end of 1963 by Resolution of the Council of Ministers of the USSR No. 1222 on the basis of SB OPI of Sevastopol Instrument Engineering Institute (SIEI) consisting of eight Departments: Instrument Engineering Techniques and Fine Mechanics; Radioelectronics; Mechanical Department; Construction Department; Extramural Department; General Technical Department; and two departments of Simferopol and Kerch branches.

Following the results of the state certification, in 1994 SIEI received the highest IV level of accreditation and was reorganized into Sevastopol State Technical University (Resolution of the Cabinet of Ministers of Ukraine No. 592 of 29 August 1994), and in 2001 by Decree of the President of Ukraine the university was granted the status of a national university. On the basis of the university the following institutions are actively operating: Institute of Modern Technologies and Innovations, SevNTU-FESTO, Delkam Training Center, Interdepartmental Laboratory of Biomechanics, Center for Training and Certification of Shipboard Personnel, Crimean Regional Center of Energy Management, a modern center of welding equipment, a driver training center, a number of training and personnel development courses (economics, computer science, management, etc.).

== Institutes and faculties ==
On the basis of the university the following institutions are actively operating: Institute of Modern Technologies and Innovations SevNTU-FESTO, Delkam Training Center, Interdepartmental Laboratory of Biomechanics, Center for Training and Certification of Shipboard Personnel, Crimean Regional Center of Energy Management, a modern center of welding equipment, a driver training center, a number of training and personnel development courses (economics, computer science, management, etc.).

Six Departments

- The Department of Economics and Management consists of five sub-departments: Finance and Credit; Accounting and Auditing; Business Economics; Economic Theory; Management, Economic and Mathematical Methods.
- The Department of Technology and Automation of Machine and Instrument Engineering and Transport consists of seven sub-departments: Machine Engineering Technology; Automobile Transport; Automation of Technological Processes and Production; Automated Application Systems; Applied Ecology and Labor Protection; Technical Mechanics and Science of Machines.
- The Department of Marine Technologies and Navigation consists of five sub-departments: Ocean Engineering and Shipbuilding; Navigation and Maritime Safety; Marine and Industrial Electromechanical Systems; Power Plants of Marine Ships and Structures; Descriptive Geometry and Graphics.
- The Department of Automation and Computer Engineering consists of four sub-departments: Engineering Cybernetics; Cybernetics and Computer Science; Information Systems; and Higher Mathematics.
- The Department of Radioelectronics consists of 3 sub-departments: Radio Engineering and Telecommunications; Electronic Engineering; and Physics.
- The Department of Humanities consists of four sub-departments: Practice of Romano-Germanic Languages; Theory and Practice of Translation; Ukrainian Studies, Pedagogy and Culturology; Philosophical and Social Sciences.

As well as two sub-departments subordinated to the rector: Physical Education and Sport; Pre-Higher Education Training.
