= Governor of Sevastopol (Russia) =

Highest-ranking official in Sevastopol

- Flag of the City of Sevastopol

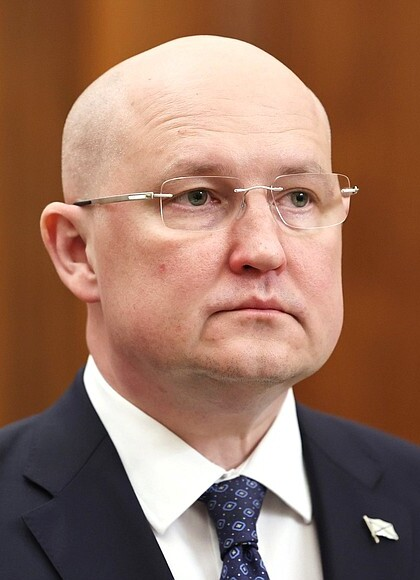
- Incumbent; Mikhail Razvozhayev since 2 October 2020
- Residence: 2 Lenin's Street, Sevastopol
- Appointer: Elected by deputies of Legislative Assembly of Sevastopol (before 2017); Elected by the citizens of Sevastopol (after 2017)
- Term length: 5 years
- Inaugural holder: Sergey Menyaylo
- Formation: 7 February 1872
- Website: City State Administration

The Governor of Sevastopol (Russian: Губернатор Севастополя; Ukrainian: Губернатор Севастополя) is head of the executive branch of the political system in the city of Sevastopol. The governor's office administers all city services, public property, police and fire protection, most public agencies, and enforces all city and state laws within Sevastopol.

The governor's office is located on Lenin Street. It has jurisdiction over all districts of Sevastopol. The governor appoints many officials, including Directors who head city departments and deputy governors.

Prior to the annexation of Sevastopol by Russia in 2014, the city administrator was called the Chairman of Sevastopol City State Administration, and was often referred to as the Mayor of Sevastopol. During this period in which Sevastopol functioned as a city with special status within Ukraine, the city administrator was appointed by the President of Ukraine. Since the Russian annexation in 2014, the status of Crimea and the city of Sevastopol is under dispute between Russia and Ukraine; Ukraine and the majority of the international community considers the Crimea and Sevastopol an integral part of Ukraine, while Russia, on the other hand, considers the Crimea and Sevastopol an integral part of Russia, with Sevastopol functioning as a federal city within the Southern Federal District.

== List of governors since 2014 ==
No.	Portrait	Governor	Tenure	Time in office	Party	Election
–		Aleksei Chaly (born 1961)	1 April 2014 – 14 April 2014	13 days	Independent	Acting
–		Sergey Menyaylo (born 1960)	14 April 2014 – 9 October 2014	2 years, 105 days	Independent	Acting
1		Sergey Menyaylo (born 1960)	9 October 2014 – 28 July 2016 (resigned)	2 years, 105 days	Independent	2014
–		Dmitry Ovsyannikov (born 1977)	28 July 2016 – 18 September 2017	2 years, 348 days	United Russia	Acting
2		Dmitry Ovsyannikov (born 1977)	18 September 2017 – 11 July 2019 (resigned)	2 years, 348 days	United Russia	2017
–		Mikhail Razvozhayev (born 1980)	11 July 2019 – 2 October 2020	7 years, 58 days	United Russia	Acting
3		Mikhail Razvozhayev (born 1980)	2 October 2020 – present	7 years, 58 days	United Russia	2020; 2025

== Heads of the city in previous eras ==
=== Russian Empire (–1917) ===
==== War/Military governors ====
- 1802–1811: Ivan de Traversay
- 1811: Roman Gall
- 1811–1816: Nikolay Yazykov
- 1816–1829: Aleksey Greig
- 1829–1830: Andrei Turshaninov
- 1830: Nosov
- 1830: Nikolai Stolypin
- 1830: Andrei Turshaninov
- 1830–1833: Aleksey Greig
- 1833–1851: Mikhail Lazarev
- 1851–1852: Maurice Berg
- 1852–1854: Mikhail Stanyukovich
- 1852–1854: Vladimir Kornilov (as commander-in-chief)
- 1854–1855: Pavel Nakhimov
- 1855: Fyodor Novosilsky
- 1855–1856: Nikolay Metlin
- 1856: Alexander Panfilov
- 1856–1857: Grigory Butakov
- 1857–1858: Feodosiy Bartenev
- 1858–1865: Pyotr Kislinsky

==== Gradonachalnik (Chiefs of the City Municipality) ====
- 1872–1873: Pavel Pereleshin
- 1873–1876: Mikhail Kazy
- 1876–1882: Andrei Nikonov
- 1882–1885: Ivan Rudnev
- 1885–1891: Mikhail Kumany
- 1891–1896: Ivan Lavrov
- 1896–1899: Constantine Valrond
- 1899–1902: Yevgeny Feodosyev
- 1902: Nikolai Khvostov
- 1902–1905: Alexander Spitsky
- 1905–1906: Yevgeny Rogulya
- 1906–1909: Vladimir von Mohrenschildt
- 1909–1913: Sergei Kuhlström
- 1913–1917: Sergey Burley

=== Revolution and Civil War (1917–1920) ===
- March–July 1917: Sergey Nikonov (as city's commissar under the Provisional Government, SR)
- August 1917 – February 1918: Sergey Nikonov (as mayor)
- December 1917 – April 1918: Yuri Gaven (as head of military revkom under the Bolsheviks)
- May–June 1918: Sergey Nikonov (as mayor)
- September 1919 – February 1920: Vladimir Subbotin (under the Whites)
- April–May 1920: Vladimir Sidorin (under the Whites)
- from November 1920: Aleksei Baranov (as Red Army commandant)

=== Soviet Russia (1920–1954) ===
==== First Secretaries of the City Committee of the Communist Party ====
- 1920–1922: unknown
- 1922–1924: Ivan Nosov
- 1924–1930s: unknown
- ?–1937: Alexander Levitin
- 1937–1938: Kiselyov
- 1938–1940: unknown
- 1940–1942: Boris Borisov
- 1944–1954: unknown

==== Chairmen of the City Executive Committee ====
- 1920–1921: Semyon Krylov
- 1921–1938: unknown
- 1938–1942: Vasiliy Yefremov
- 1942–1944: (Nazi Germany occupation)
- 1944–1946: Vasiliy Yefremov
- 1946–1948: unknown (Pavel Levin as secretary in 1947–?)
- 1948–1949: V. Filippov
- 1949–1950: unknown
- 1950–1954: Serhiy Sosnytskyi

==== Burgermeister (under Nazi occupation) ====
- July–August 1942: Nikolay Madatov
- 1942–1943: P. Supryagin

== See also ==
- Sevastopol Police
- Mayor of Moscow
  - List of heads of Moscow government
- Governor of Saint Petersburg
