= Legislative Assembly of Sevastopol =

Regional parliament of Sevastopol

Legislative Assembly of Sevastopol City Законодательное собрание города Севастополя

Type
- Type: Unicameral

History
- Founded: 17 March 2014
- Preceded by: Sevastopol City Council

Leadership
- Chairman: Vladimir Nemtsev, United Russia

Structure
- Seats: 24
- Political groups: Government (24): United Russia (20); CPRF (1); LDPR (1); New People (2)

Elections
- Voting system: Mixed
- Last election: 8 September 2024
- Next election: 2029

Meeting place
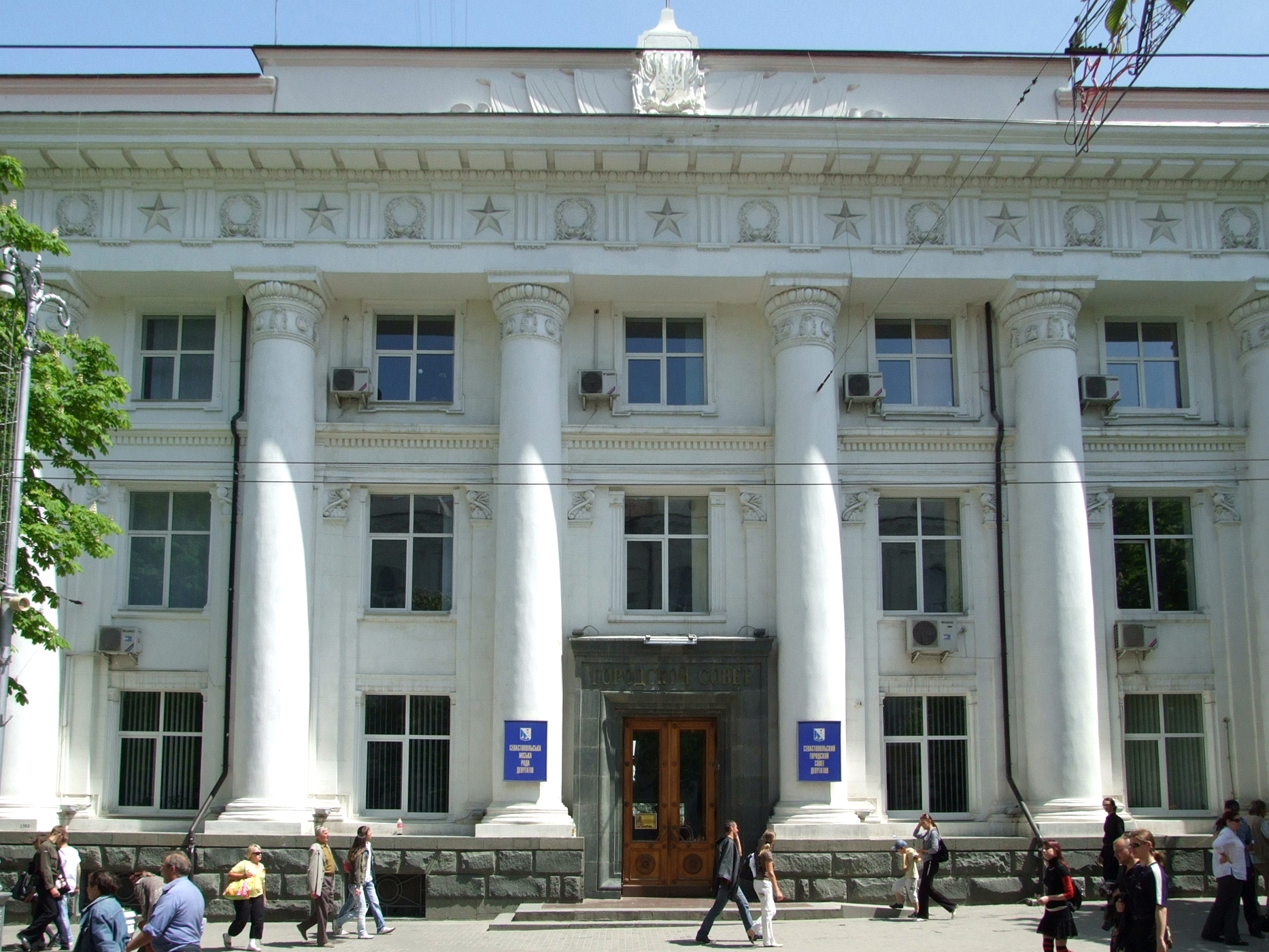
- 3 Lenin Street, Sevastopol

Website
- sevzakon.ru

The Legislative Assembly of Sevastopol (Russian: Законодательное собрание города Севастополя) is the regional parliament of Sevastopol. It de facto replaced the Sevastopol City Council after the Russian military intervention in Crimea in 2014. The legislature is composed of 24 members.

== Elections ==
=== 2014 ===
Party	%	Seats
United Russia	92	22
LDPR	8	2

=== 2019 ===
Party	%	Seats
United Russia	62.5	15
CPRF	12.5	3
LDPR	12.5	3
A Just Russia	4.16	1
Party of Pensioners	4.16	1

=== 2024 ===
Party	%	Seats
United Russia		20
CPRF		1
LDPR		1
New People		2

== List of chairmen ==
- Yuriy Doynikov (17 March 2014 – 22 September 2014)
- Aleksei Chaly (22 September 2014 – 22 March 2016)
- Yekaterina Altabayeva (6 September 2016 – 14 September 2019)
- Vladimir Nemtsev (14 September 2019 – present)
