= United Russia =

Ruling political party of Russia

United Russia Единая Россия
- Chairman: Dmitry Medvedev
- De facto leader: Vladimir Putin
- Secretary (Note: Official title: "Secretary of the General Council of the United Russia".): Vladimir Yakushev
- Parliamentary leader: Dmitry Kobylkin
- Founders: Sergei Shoigu; Yury Luzhkov; Mintimer Shaimiev
- Founded: 1 December 2001; 24 years ago
- Merger of: Unity; Fatherland – All Russia
- Headquarters: Kutuzovsky Prospekt, 39, Moscow 121170
- Youth wing: Young Guard of United Russia
- Membership: ▲2,600,000 (2025 est.)
- Ideology: Putinism; Conservatism; Statism; Russian nationalism; Euroscepticism
- Political position: Centre to right-wing (Note: United Russia does not have a coherent ideology but has been described by various sources as centrist, centre-right, and right-wing.)
- Political alliance: People's Front
- International affiliation: For the Freedom of Nations!
- Colours: White Blue Red
- Federation Council: 136 / 178
- State Duma: 350 / 450
- Governors: 83 / 89
- Regional Parliaments: 2,682 / 3,980
- Government Ministers: 20 / 31

Website
- er.ru

The All-Russian Political Party "United Russia" (Note: Russian: Всероссийская политическая партия «Единая Россия», romanized: Vserossiyskaya politicheskaya partiya "Yedinaya Rossiya", IPA: [fsʲɪrɐˈsʲijskəjə pəlʲɪˈtʲitɕɪskəjə ˈpartʲɪjə (j)ɪˈdʲinəjə rɐˈsʲijə]) is the ruling political party of Russia since 2001. As the largest party in the Russian Federation, it holds 349 (or 78%) of the 450 seats in the State Duma as of 2026, having constituted the majority in the chamber since 2007. Its nationalist and Eurosceptic ideology is inconsistent and embraces specific officials, all of whom support Vladimir Putin. Although in 2009 it proclaimed Russian conservatism as its official ideology, it appeals mainly to pro-Putin and non-ideological voters, and is often classified by political scientists as a "big-tent party", or as a "party of power", rather than an organisation that is primarily based upon a political ideology.

The party was formed on 1 December 2001 through a merger of Unity and the parties of the Fatherland – All Russia bloc, with Our Home – Russia joining later. Following the 2003 and 2011 election results, United Russia held a parliamentary majority in the State Duma and a constitutional majority in 2007, 2016, and 2021. In the Duma elections of 2011, for the first time, the United Russia electoral list was formed based on the results of the preliminary (primary) elections held jointly with the All-Russia People's Front. According to the decisions of the XII Congress of United Russia, adopted on 24 September 2011, in the Duma elections, the party's pre-election list was headed by the President of the Russian Federation at the time, Dmitry Medvedev, and in the 2012 elections, Putin became the presidential candidate. The structure of the party is made up of regional, local, and primary branches. Regional branches of United Russia have been created in all subjects of the Russian Federation. In Russia, there are 82,631 primary and 2,595 local branches of the party.

United Russia supports the policies of Putin, who is the incumbent Russian president and served as party leader during the presidency of Dmitry Medvedev; despite not currently holding formal positions in the party ranks, Putin operates as its de facto leader. United Russia's votes peaked in the 2007 Russian legislative election with 64.3% of the vote, while in recent years, it has seen its popularity decline.

== History ==
=== Origins ===
United Russia's predecessor was the Unity bloc, which was created three months before the December 1999 Duma elections to counter the advance of the Fatherland – All Russia (OVR) bloc led by Yuri Luzhkov and Yevgeny Primakov. The creation of the party was heavily supported by Kremlin insiders, who were wary of what looked like a certain OVR victory. They did not expect Unity to have much chance of success since President Boris Yeltsin was very unpopular and Prime Minister Vladimir Putin's ratings were still minuscule. The new party attempted to mimic OVR's formula of success, placing an emphasis on competence and pragmatism. Charismatic Minister of Emergency Situations Sergei Shoigu was appointed as the party leader.

Tatyana Yumasheva, Yeltsin's daughter, wrote on her LiveJournal blog that Boris Berezovsky was a founder of United Russia: "Now United Russia does not like to remember that Berezovsky had something to do with the idea of the emergence of Unity. But history is history. We must not forget those who stood at its origins. Otherwise, it resembles the history of the VKP(b), which was carefully rewritten every time when its next founder turned out to be an enemy of the people."

In 1999, Prime Minister Putin's support increased to double-digit figures after he sent troops into Chechnya in retaliation for bombings in Moscow and other cities attributed to Chechen terrorists and in response to the Chechen invasion of Dagestan. The war effort was hugely popular and portrayed positively by the Boris Berezovsky-owned Public Russian Television (ORT) as well as by state-controlled RTR.

Contrary to its founders' expectations, Unity's election campaign in the 1999 election was a success with the party receiving 23.3% of the votes, considerably more than OVR's 13.3% and within one percentage point of the Communist Party's 24.3%. The popularity of the prime minister proved decisive for Unity's victory. The election results also made clear that Putin was going to win the 2000 presidential election, which resulted in competitors Luzhkov and Yevgeni Primakov dropping out. Yeltsin also gave Putin a boost by resigning as president on 31 December 1999.

=== Creation ===
While Unity initially possessed one narrow purpose, limited only to the 1999 Duma elections, state officials began transforming the party into a permanent one after the results. A large number of independent deputies who had been elected to the Duma were invited to join the party's delegation. Many OVR deputies joined, including its leader Luzhkov. In April 2001, OVR and Unity leaders declared they had started the unification process. In July 2001, the unified party, the Union of Unity and Fatherland, held its founding congress. In December 2001, it became the All-Russian Party "Unity and Fatherland"—United Russia, a merger of Unity, the Fatherland movement, and the All Russia movement that joined them later, led by Mintimer Shaimiev.

Instead of the "communism versus capitalism" dichotomy that had dominated the political discourse in the 1990s, in the 1999–2000 electoral cycle Putin started to emphasize another reason to vote for his party: stability, which was yearned for by Russian citizens after a decade of chaotic change. With the exception of the continued fighting in the Northern Caucasus, Putin was perceived to have delivered it.

=== 2001–2003 ===
After the merger of the parties at the founding congress, the leaders of the merged parties (Sergei Shoigu, Yuri Luzhkov, and Mintimer Shaimiev) were elected co-chairs of the Supreme Council of the party. Alexander Bespalov became the chairman of the party's general council, which carried out practical leadership, and the party's central executive committee. The council included the secretary of the Fatherland – All Russia political council, Alexander Vladislavlev, Frants Klintsevich, and a member of the Federation Council, Sergey Popov.

On 20 November 2002, Interior Minister Boris Gryzlov became chairman of the Supreme Council. Bespalov's powers as chairman of the General Council were curtailed, and on 27 February 2003, he left his post. Valery Bogomolov became the chairman of the party's general council, and Yury Volkov became the head of the central executive committee. On 13 January 2003, United Russia had 257,000 members, placing it behind only the Liberal Democratic Party of Russia (600,000) and the Communists (500,000). On 31 January 2003, the party was registered by the Ministry of Justice of the Russian Federation.

On 29 March 2003, the Second Party Congress took place. The Congress approved the report presented by Boris Gryzlov and approved the manifesto "The Path of National Success". At the congress, it was decided to develop an election program for the upcoming parliamentary elections. Sergei Shoigu stood down, and Boris Gryzlov was elected as the new party leader.

On 20 September 2003, the Third Party Congress adopted the election program and approved the list of candidates for the elections. The congress was welcomed by Vladimir Putin, who wished the party success in the elections. On 7 December, the party "Unity and Fatherland - United Russia" won the elections, receiving 37.57% of the vote, and with single-mandate members, a constitutional majority in the State Duma. Gryzlov became speaker of the State Duma.

On 24 December 2003, the Fourth Congress took place, at which Gryzlov made a report. The congress approved the main provisions and conclusions of the report, as well as the party's activities during the election campaign. The congress adopted a unanimous decision to support the candidacy of Vladimir Putin in the presidential elections. In addition, it was decided to rename the party from Unity and Fatherland - United Russia into United Russia.

==== 2003 State Duma elections ====
Throughout Putin's first years as president, the country's economy improved considerably, growing more each year than in all of the previous decade and Putin's approval ratings hovered well above 70%. Russia's economic recovery was helped by high prices for its primary exports such as oil, gas and raw materials. The passage rate of law proposals increased considerably after United Russia became the dominant party in the Duma. In 1996–1999, only 76% of the legislation that passed the third reading was signed by the President while in 1999–2003 the ratio was 93%. While Yeltsin had often relied on his decree powers to enact major decisions, Putin almost never had to. United Russia's dominance in the Duma enabled Putin to push through a wide range of fundamental reforms, including a flat income tax of 13%, a reduced profits tax, an overhaul of the labour market, breakups of national monopolies and new land and legal codes. United Russia characterised itself as wholly supportive of Putin's agenda, which proved a recipe for success and resulted in the party gaining a victory in the 2003 Duma elections, receiving more than a third of the popular vote.

Throughout its history, United Russia has been successful in using administrative resources to weaken its opponents. For example, state-controlled news media portrayed the Communist Party as hypocritical for accepting money from several "dollar millionaires" during the 2003 Duma election campaign. Opposition parties also made several strategic mistakes. For example, Yabloko and the Union of Right Forces seemed to spend more effort attacking each other than Putin, which made it easier for United Russia to win over liberal voters on the strength of market reforms under Putin. The opposition parties faltered in the 2003 elections, with the Communists gaining just 52 seats, a drop from 113 in 1999. Liberal opponents fared even worse, with Yabloko and Union of the Right Forces failing to cross the 5 percent threshold.

=== 2004–2007 ===
On 27 November 2004, at the Fifth Congress, a management reform was carried out: the central political council was liquidated and the post of party chairman was introduced. Boris Gryzlov was elected chairman of United Russia. On 22 April 2005, Vyacheslav Volodin, Vice Speaker of the State Duma, was elected the new Secretary of the United Russia General Council, replacing Valery Bogomolov. On 23 April 2005, 35-year-old State Duma deputy Andrey Vorobyov, head of the United Russia Foundation, took over as head of the central executive committee.

The new leadership of "United Russia" has set the goal of "partization of power". In the spring of 2005, a law was adopted on elections to the State Duma exclusively on party lists. Then the State Duma adopted amendments to federal legislation allowing the party that won the elections to the regional parliament to propose to the President of Russia their candidacy for the governor's post. In the overwhelming majority of regions, this right belonged to United Russia. The vast majority of governors are members of United Russia. In April 2006, Boris Gryzlov announced that 66 out of 88 leaders of Russian regions were already members of the party. Since 2005, the leaders of the large industrial corporations Rot Front, Babaevsky, Mechel, and AvtoVAZ have joined the party.

On 26 November 2005, the 6th Party Congress was held in Krasnoyarsk, which approved a new charter version. According to one of the amendments, in case of failure to comply with the decisions of the central and regional party bodies, the activities of a regional political association that does not comply with these decisions may be terminated. No changes were made to the party program at the congress. On the eve of the 7th Congress of the Party, the leadership of the political party "Russian United Industrial Party" (ROPP) applied for a merger with the political party "United Russia". The formal merger took place on 1 December 2006.

On 2 December 2006, the 7th Party Congress was held in Yekaterinburg. As a result of the congress, the program statement "The Russia We Choose" was approved, which outlined a development strategy based on the principles of sovereign democracy. In 2006–2007, United Russia initiated the creation of some new organizations: the Young Guard of United Russia, the Union of Pensioners of Russia, the Pedagogical Society of Russia, and the All-Russian Council of Local Self-Government, aiming to create more favourable conditions for the public realization of the interests of their members.

==== 2007 State Duma elections ====
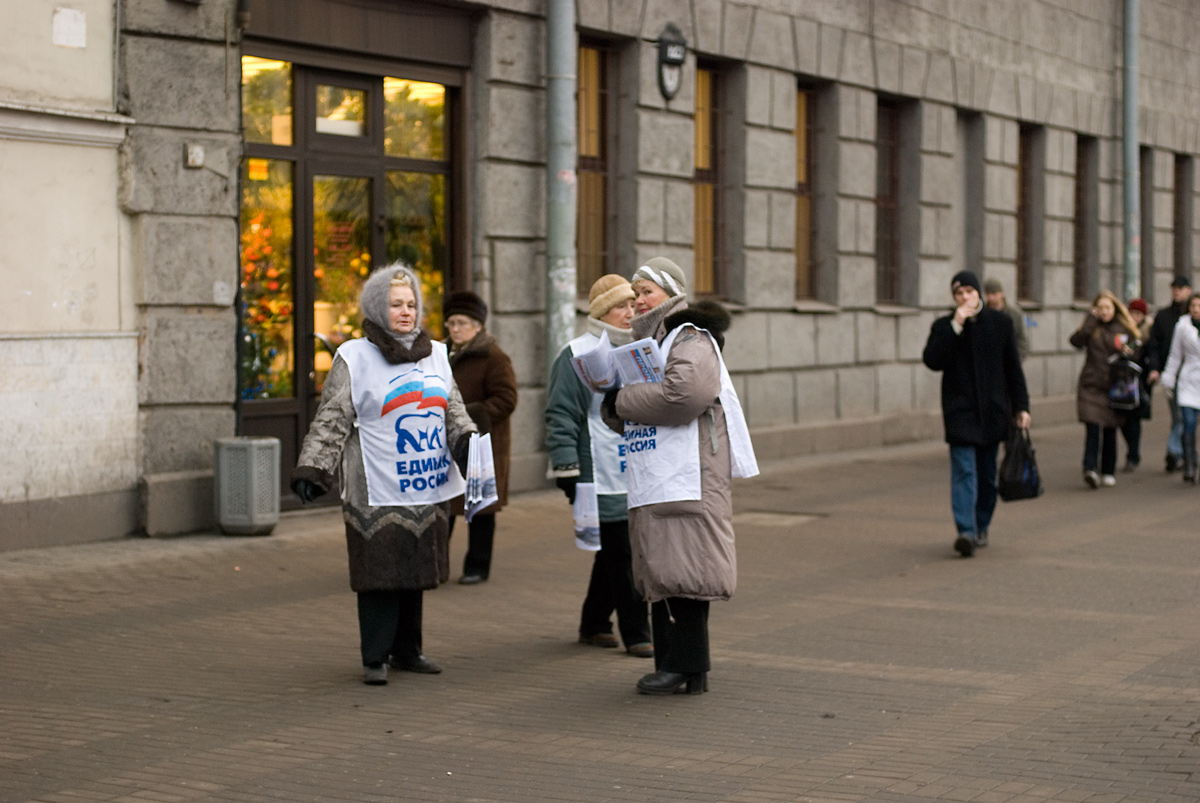
United Russia campaigners in Saint Petersburg during the Russian 2007 election

As the economy continued to improve, Putin moved to rein in the unpopular oligarchs, Putin's approval ratings stayed high and he won the 2004 presidential election with over 71% of the votes. The 2007 Duma elections saw United Russia gain 64.3% of the votes. The Communist Party became a distant second with 11.57% of the votes. Putin was the only name on United Russia's national list. United Russia also introduced tougher party, candidate and voter registration requirements and increased the election threshold from 5% to 7% for the 2007 elections.

During the December 2007 election, the party was accused by voters and election monitoring group Golos of numerous election law violations banned in the Russian Constitution. The legislative agenda shifted somewhat after the 2007 elections. Anti-terrorism legislation, large increases in social spending and the creation of new state corporations became the dominant issues while less energy was devoted to economic reform.

=== 2008–2010 ===
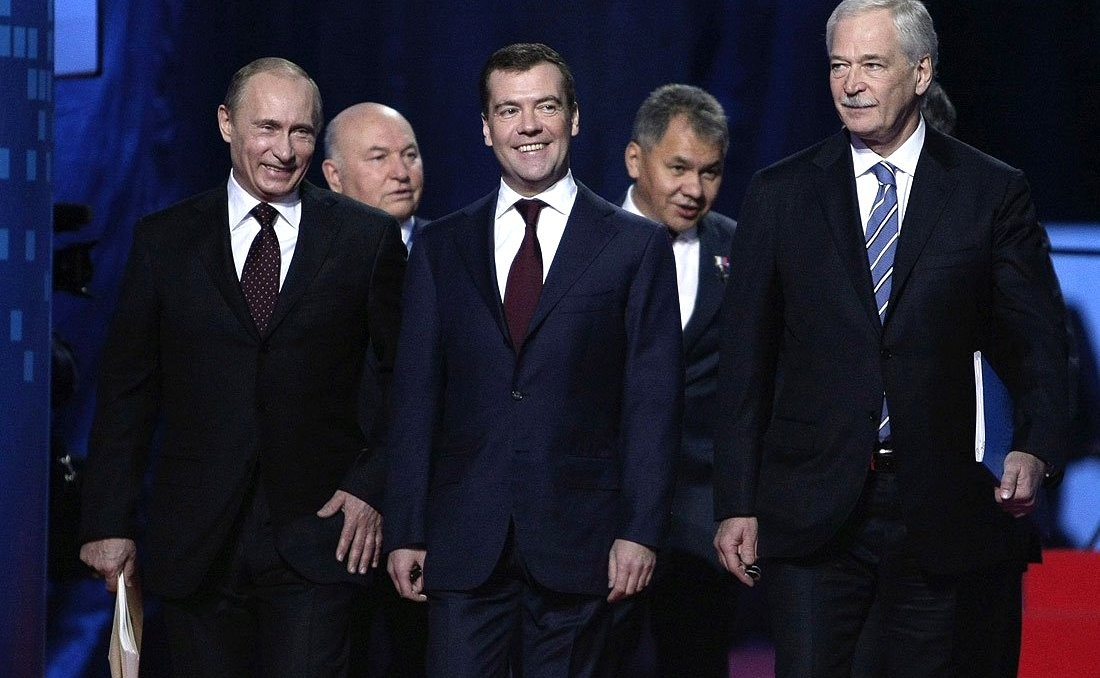
Then party leader Vladimir Putin with Yury Luzhkov, Dmitry Medvedev, Sergei Shoigu and Boris Gryzlov in 2009 at the 11th United Russia Party Congress

For the 2008 presidential election, United Russia nominated Dmitry Medvedev to succeed Putin. Medvedev received Putin's blessing and scored a clear victory, receiving 71% of the votes. As President, Medvedev nominated Putin as his Prime Minister. On 15 April 2008, Putin accepted a nomination to become the party's leader, but declared that this did not mean he would become a member. Medvedev also refused to become a member. On 7 May 2008, Boris Gryzlov was replaced as party leader by Putin. The Agrarian Party supported the candidacy of Dmitry Medvedev in the 2008 presidential election and it merged into United Russia.

During regional elections of 11 October 2009, United Russia won a majority of seats in almost every Russian municipality. Opposition candidates stated they were hindered from campaigning for the elections and some were denied places on the ballot. There were allegations of widespread ballot stuffing and voter intimidation as well as statistical analysis results supporting these accusations. Support for United Russia was 53% in a poll held in October 2009. On 28 September 2010, the dismissed mayor of Moscow, Yury Luzhkov, left the post of co-chairman of the Supreme Council of United Russia and left the party.

=== 2011–2013 ===
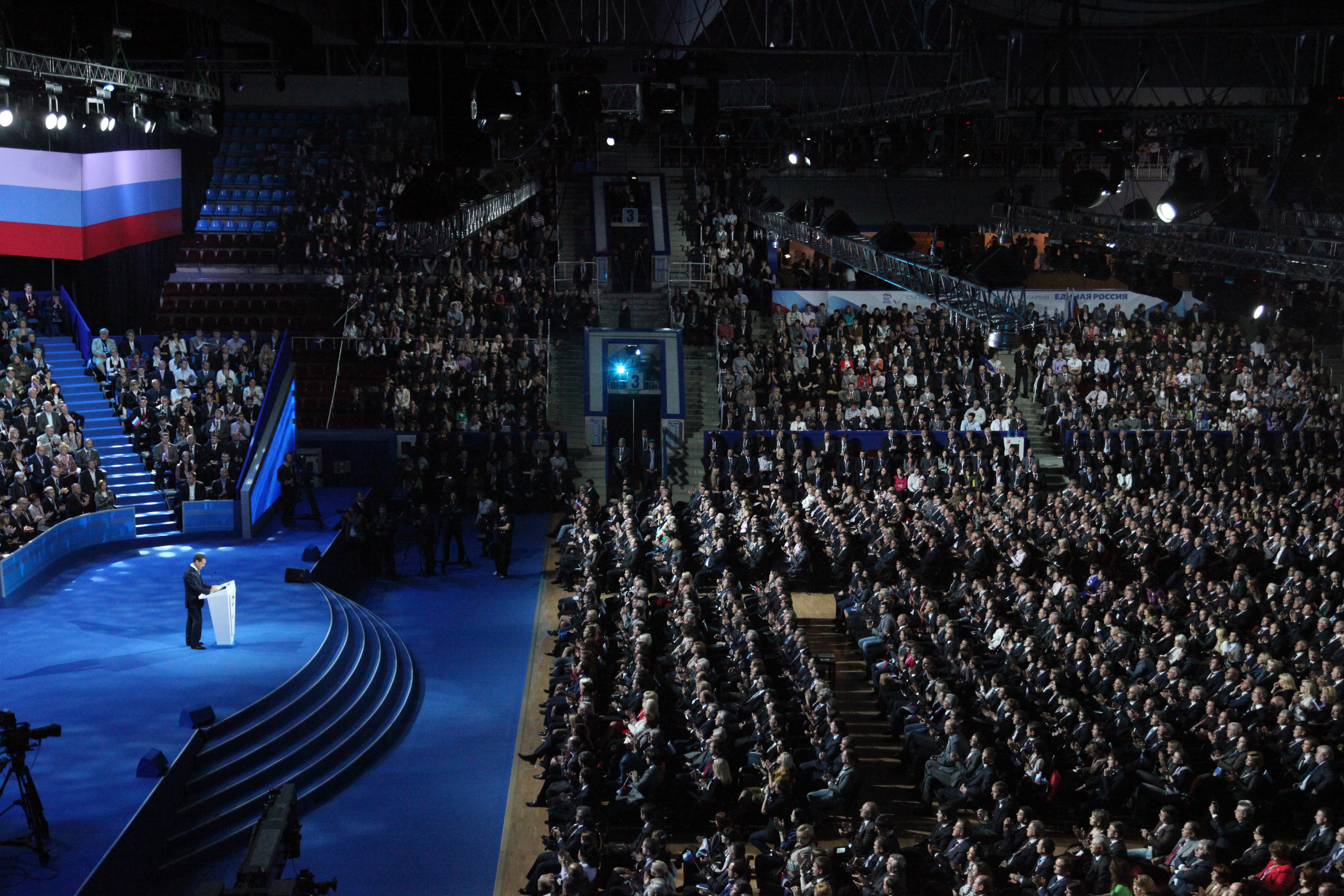
12th Congress of United Russia

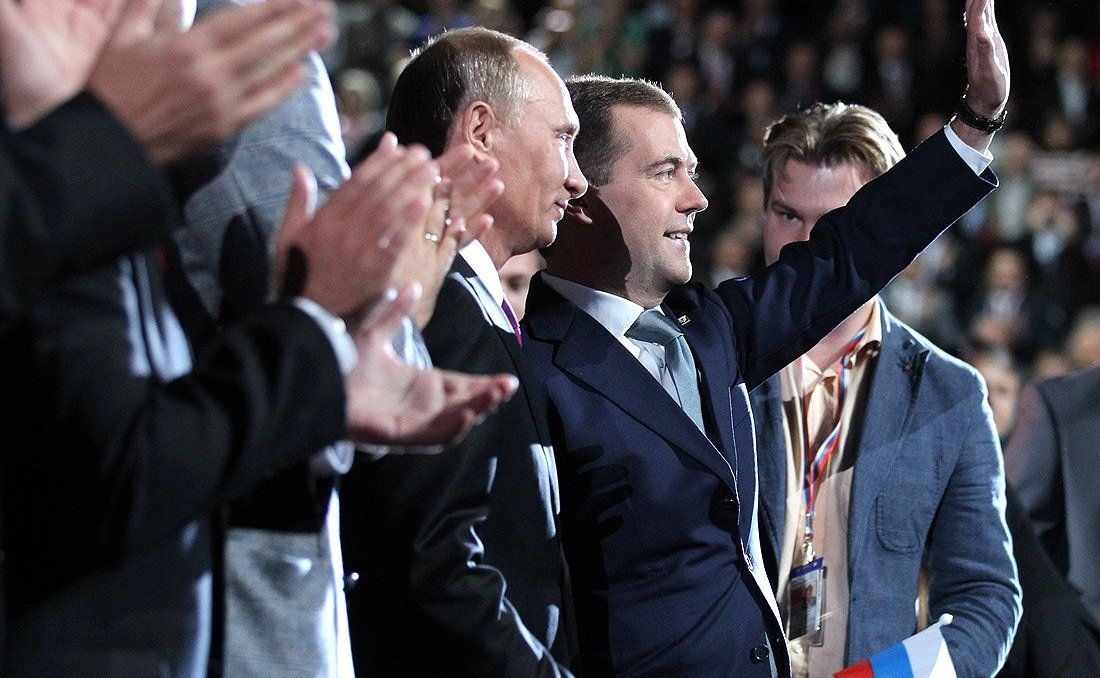
Medvedev and Putin at the 12th Party Congress in September 2011

In 2010–2011 and following the economic crisis, support for United Russia was variable but declined overall. The share of the population voting for the party reached its lowest point in January 2011 (35%) before recovering to 41% in March 2011. At the 12th Party Congress held on 24 September 2011, Medvedev supported Prime Minister Putin's candidacy in the 2012 presidential election, which effectively assured Putin would return to the presidency, given the party's near-total dominance of Russian politics. Medvedev accepted Prime Minister Putin's offer to lead United Russia in the Duma elections and said that, in his opinion, Putin should run for president in 2012. The delegates gave this statement a standing ovation and unanimously supported his presidential candidacy. Medvedev reacted immediately, saying that applause was proof of Putin's popularity among the people. About ten thousand participants in the meeting listened to Medvedev's speech. In total, the congress was attended by about 12,000 participants, guests and journalists, which is unprecedented for such political meetings.

At the same congress, the pre-election list of candidates from the party for the December elections to the State Duma was approved. The list included 416 party members and 183 non-party members, 363 of whom are running for the first time. On 29 September 2011, the list was submitted to the Central Election Commission of the Russian Federation. President Medvedev headed the party's list. 582 congress delegates voted for the list, and one voted against. The election program of United Russia was announced in speeches by Medvedev and Putin at the congress. Medvedev identified seven strategic government policy priorities, and Putin proposed writing off 30 billion rubles in erroneous tax debts of 36 million Russians and raising the salaries of public sector workers by 6.5% from 10 October. Putin also noted that taxes for wealthy citizens should be higher than for the middle class and suggested raising housing and communal services tariffs only over the established norm. Among other priorities, Putin named the complete rearmament of the army and navy in 5–10 years, doubling the pace of road construction in 10 years, creating or updating 25 million jobs in 20 years, and Russia becoming one of the five largest economies in the world.

At the 13th Party Congress on 26 May 2012, Medvedev was elected chairman of United Russia. United Russia decided not to use Medvedev and Putin's portraits during the autumn election campaign. On 26 September, the Vedomosti newspaper wrote about this, citing a high-ranking source within the party. In March 2013, about 50 United Russia members from the Abansky District of Krasnoyarsk Krai announced their withdrawal from the party. They sent an open letter (stating that 60 people signed it) to party chairman Medvedev, in which they criticized the party's activities, which, according to them, has ceased to fulfil its political function. On 5 October 2013, the 14th Party Congress took place in Moscow. According to the registration data, out of 726 delegates to the 14th Congress, 697 were present.

==== All-Russia People's Front (ONF) ====
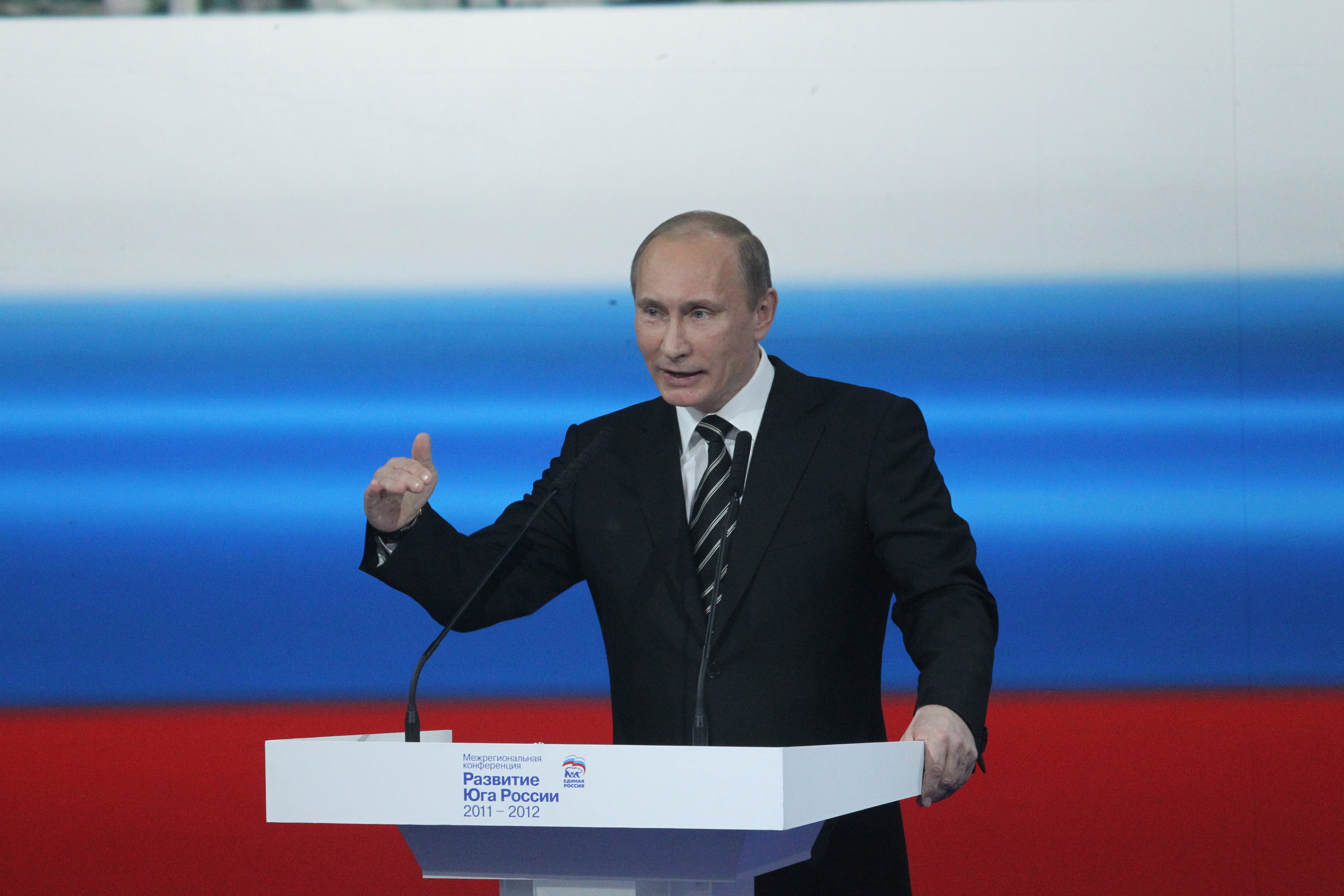
Vladimir Putin at an interregional conference in the Southern Federal District announces the creation of the All-Russia People's Front

On 6 May 2011, during the interregional conference in the Southern Federal District, the acting Prime Minister of Russia and the leader of United Russia, Vladimir Putin, took the initiative to create the All-Russia People's Front, a political union of public organizations. Representatives of the ONF, according to his idea, were included in United Russia list in the Duma elections in 2011 and took part in the party's primaries.

I propose to create what in political practice is called a broad popular front. It is a tool for uniting congenial political forces. I would very much like United Russia, some other political parties, trade unions, women's, youth, and veteran organizations, including veterans of the Great Patriotic War and veterans of the war in Afghanistan, that all people who are united by a common desire to strengthen our country, the idea of finding the most optimal solutions to the problems we face, could work within a single platform.

This form of uniting the efforts of all political forces is used in different countries and by different political forces - both left and right, and patriotic - this is a tool for uniting political forces congenial in spirit. I would like United Russia, other parties, and public organizations to all people united by the desire to improve the country's life. This association could be called the "All-Russian People's Front", within which non-partisan candidates could get into the Duma on the list of United Russia.

— Vladimir Putin

We have a lot of bilateral agreements with public organizations. We are already working with them, but we are working in some specific areas. The creation of the front is the next step in the consolidation of United Russia and outside organizations. We would like to involve public organizations in writing the program. We would like as many public associations and organizations as possible to offer their ideas for the further development of our country.

— Boris Gryzlov

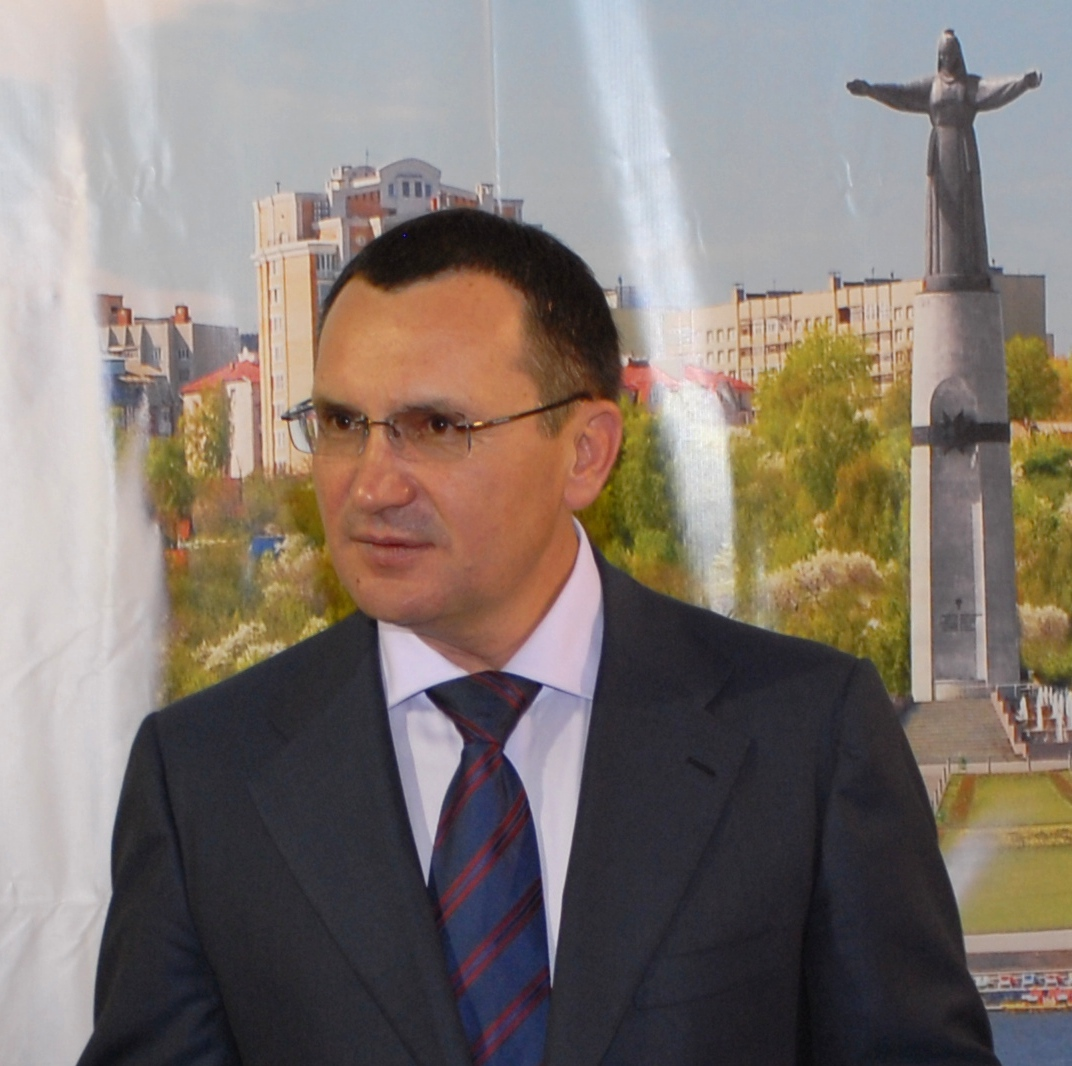
Nikolay Fyodorov – responsible for the work on the People's Program for United Russia and the ONF

On 7 May 2011, the first meeting of the coordinating council of the new organization was held, which was attended by representatives of 16 public organizations. On 13 June, a draft declaration on the formation of the front was published on the United Russia website. The ONF included more than 500 public organizations. The largest are Opora Rossii, the Russian Union of Industrialists and Entrepreneurs, the Federation of Independent Trade Unions of Russia, Delovaya Rossiya, the Union of Pensioners of Russia, the Young Guard of United Russia, the Union of Transport Workers of Russia, and the Union of Women of Russia. Also on 7 June, after numerous appeals from citizens, it was decided to allow individuals to join the ONF. As of 14 June 2011, more than 6,000 people wished to join the movement.

The political and economic program of the ONF was developed by the Institute for Socio-Economic and Political Research under the leadership of the former president of Chuvashia, Nikolay Fyodorov, in the fall of 2011 and was adopted by the party congress. As Fyodorov noted, the People's Program became a guide for the legislative work of the State Duma of the new convocation, and all agreed decisions became mandatory for deputies from United Russia and the ONF.

According to a Gazeta.ru author, by creating the ONF, Vladimir Putin and United Russia, for the first time, openly violated the principle of departization of the economy and public life, which was introduced on 20 July 1991 by Boris Yeltsin's decree "On the termination of the activities of the organizational structures of political parties and mass social movements in state bodies, institutions and organizations of the RSFSR" and which became one of the foundations of the Russian political system.

Statements that the ONF is not registered and therefore is outside the legal field do not stand up to criticism. In terms of its composition and organizational form, the "front" corresponds to a social movement, and in terms of its goals - to a political party. The formation of the political will of citizens and participation in elections is the prerogative of the parties. And the ONF, according to its declaration, was created precisely for the preparation of a people's program "based on the widest discussion in all public organizations" (and now at enterprises) and for joint participation in the elections

— Gazeta.ru

=== 2014–present ===
On 5–6 February 2016, the 15th Party Congress of United Russia took place in Moscow. The main topic was the approval of the procedure for holding a preliminary vote to select candidates for elections to the State Duma of the seventh convocation. On 22 May 2016, United Russia held party elections (primaries) on an all-Russian scale - formally for selecting candidates from the party in the elections to the State Duma; however, the victory of one or another person in these primaries did not mean at all that the winner would become a candidate from United Russia in the elections to the State Duma.

Some winners were excluded from the lists by the party leadership (often under strange pretexts), and their places on the party list were given to persons who showed very low results in the voting on 22 May 2016. For example, in the final regional party list for Sverdlovsk Oblast, the "passing" 2nd and 3rd places went to the participants who took 9th and 10th places in the primaries. By a similar principle, some of the winners of the primaries in single-member constituencies were replaced. For example, the party appointed a person as a candidate from the party in the Nizhny Tagil district, who, according to the results of the voting in the district, took only fourth place.

More than 20 people who did not participate in the primaries on 22 May were nominated by the party as candidates for the State Duma, moreover, in "passing places". In addition, in 18 single-member districts where the primaries were held, United Russia did not nominate anyone to the State Duma in 2016. The motives for this decision are unknown, especially since the results of the primaries for these districts were not canceled. By the beginning of the active stage of the election campaign for the State Duma, reshuffles were made in the campaign headquarters headed by Sergei Neverov, which began work in two different formats: the operational headquarters (meets twice a week in a narrow format to solve operational problems) and the extended headquarters (meeting in full force once every two weeks). On 22 January 2017, Medvedev was re-elected as party chairman.

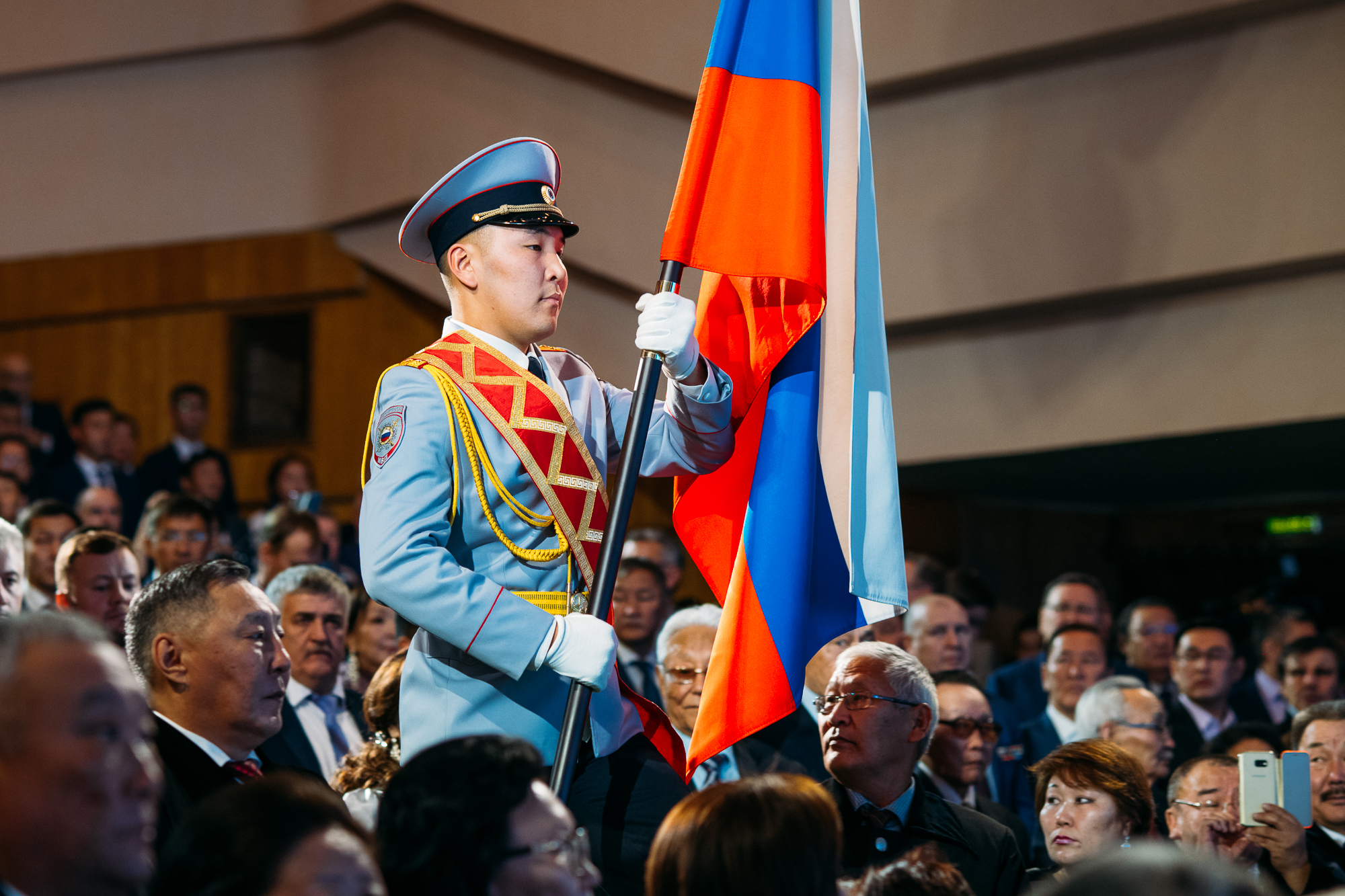
The official inauguration ceremony of the elected Head of the Sakha Republic, Aysen Nikolaev, on 27 September 2018

On 26 May 2019, for the first time in the history of large-scale political elections held in Russia, the party applied the secret electronic preliminary voting procedure using blockchain technology. Secret electronic voting was used by voters in 47 regions of Russia in multi-level elections to determine candidates for subsequent nomination from United Russia to the State Duma, regional parliaments, and local governments. In the 2021 Duma elections, the party retained its supermajority in the State Duma, despite polls before the election indicating historic low levels of support for the party at around 30%, leading to widespread allegations of electoral fraud in favour of United Russia.

In March 2022, during the Russian invasion of Ukraine, the party opened an aid centre in Mariupol. In November 2022, several United Russia sources reported that the party would not hold an annual congress because "the party is not ready to propose a strategic agenda." Refusal to hold an annual congress is a violation of the party charter. In December 2022, the European Union sanctioned United Russia due to the 2022 Russian invasion of Ukraine.

== Participation in elections ==
=== Elections to the State Duma ===
United Russia has participated in all elections to the State Duma of the Russian Federation since 2003 (since 1999 through its predecessors: Fatherland – All Russia and Unity). At the same time, the party actively used the "locomotive" political strategy: including in its party lists well-known persons who were not going to become deputies or refused mandates immediately after the election, while less well-known party members worked in the State Duma instead of them. In 2003, 37 elected candidates from United Russia refused deputy mandates; in 2007, they were 116 candidates, and 99 candidates in 2011. Among the participants of United Russia's "locomotive" were the President of the Russian Federation (2007, 2011), the heads of the constituent entities of the Russian Federation, ministers of the Russian Government, and mayors of cities.

==== Elections to the State Duma of the IV convocation, 2003 ====
Elections to the State Duma of the Federal Assembly of Russia of the fourth convocation were held on 7 December 2003 and became the first elections in which United Russia acted as a political party. As a result of voting, United Russia received 223 seats in parliament (120 on the list and 103 in single-member districts). Boris Gryzlov, Sergei Shoigu, and Yuri Luzhkov headed United Russia's list. The voter turnout was 55.75%. United Russia gained 37.56% votes, giving it 120 mandates; the party received another 103 mandates in single-mandate districts, which, together with joining the self-nominated faction, allowed it to form a qualified majority in the State Duma.

==== Elections to the State Duma of the V convocation, 2007 ====
Elections of deputies of the State Duma of the Federal Assembly of the Russian Federation of the fifth convocation were held on 2 December 2007. United Russia won 315 seats in the parliament following the elections. For the first time, the elections were held exclusively according to the proportional system, without the participation of single-mandate candidates.

Vladimir Putin single-handedly headed United Russia's federal list. On 1 October 2007, President Putin announced at the United Russia party congress that he would accept the party's invitation to head the list of candidates, although he refused to join the party. In his speech, Vladimir Putin said that a previous speaker's suggestion that he become prime minister after the end of his second presidential term "is completely realistic, but it's too early to talk about it now." United Russia refused participate in any broadcast political debates, but on 1 October, it approved a program in which it promised to continue Putin's political course. The electoral program was called "Putin's Plan: A Worthy Future for a Great Country." During the 2007 campaign, President Putin gave United Russia official permission to use his name and image in the party's election campaign to the State Duma of the V convocation.

The voter turnout was 63.78%, and United Russia received 64.20%, which allowed it to get 315 seats and secure a constitutional majority in the State Duma after uniting with single-mandate members and members of the faction of the People's Party of Russia.

==== Elections to the State Duma of the VI convocation, 2011 ====
Elections of deputies of the State Duma of the Federal Assembly of the Russian Federation of the VI convocation were held on 4 December 2011. For the first time, the State Duma was elected for five years. As a result of the elections, United Russia received 238 seats. As in 2007, the elections were held only under the proportional system. On 24 September 2011, at the 12th United Russia Party Congress, President Medvedev headed the United Russia electoral list. The voter turnout was 60.1% of voters. According to official data from the Central Election Commission of Russia, 49.31% of voters voted for United Russia. In the 2011 Duma elections, United Russia formed an electoral list based on the All-Russian primaries together with the All-Russian Popular Front, at least 150 of whose representatives were included in the party's federal list. Boris Gryzlov also noted that federal politicians and ministers would be at the head of some regional groups of the party in the elections and did not rule out that after the elections, the composition of the Russian Government would change.

Also in 2011, United Russia took part in a televised debate for the first time. It was announced that Speaker of the State Duma Boris Gryzlov, Secretary of the Presidium of the General Council Sergey Neverov, head of the CEC of the party Andrey Vorobyov, deputies Andrey Isayev, Svetlana Orlova, Andrey Makarov, Governor of the Krasnodar Krai Alexander Tkachev could take part in the debate. However, United Russia members participated in free debates within the framework of the air provided by law. They abstained from participating in some paid debates, particularly with the Communist Party of the Russian Federation, preferring to meet with the Communists at free debates. Putin, the leader of United Russia, and Medvedev, the leader of the federal list of United Russia in the elections, the chairman of the supreme council of the party Boris Gryzlov, as well as members of the government who headed the lists of the party in power in the regions, did not take part in the pre-election debates.

==== Elections to the State Duma of the VII convocation, 2016 ====
Elections of deputies of the State Duma of the Federal Assembly of the Russian Federation of the VII convocation were held throughout Russia on 18 September 2016, on a single voting day. The elections were held in a mixed electoral system: out of 450 deputies, 225 were elected on party lists in a single federal district (proportional system), and another 225 were elected in single-member districts (majority system). The party's federal list was again headed by Dmitry Medvedev, chairman of the United Russia party. As a result of the elections, United Russia received 343 mandates in the new convocation and formed a constitutional majority. The turnout in the elections was 47.88%; the party won 54.20% of the votes on the lists, which brought it 140 mandates. United Russia received another 203 mandates according to voting results in single-mandate constituencies. The final 343 seats in parliament are the highest indicator of the party in the elections to the State Duma.

==== Elections to the State Duma of the VIII convocation, 2021 ====
Elections of deputies of the State Duma of the Federal Assembly of the Russian Federation of the VIII convocation were held on 17–19 September, ending on a single voting day on 19 September 2021. The elections were held according to a mixed electoral system: according to party lists (225 deputies) and single-mandate constituencies (225 deputies). At the party congress on 19 June 2021, President Vladimir Putin proposed to include Defense Minister Sergei Shoigu, Foreign Minister Sergei Lavrov, Chief Physician of the Moscow City Clinical Hospital No. 40 "Kommunarka" Denis Protsenko, head of the Sirius Educational Center and co-chairman of the central headquarters of the All-Russia People's Front Yelena Shmelyova, and the Commissioner for Children's Rights under the President of the Russian Federation Anna Kuznetsova.

To select the remaining candidates in all constituencies, the party was the only one of all the election participants to conduct a preliminary vote (primaries). From 15 March to 14 May, more than 7.5 thousand applications were accepted from applicants - members of United Russia and non-partisans. 30% of the participants in the preliminary voting were volunteers working during the pandemic and social activists. For the first time, advance voting became electronic throughout the country, but in 46 regions, the possibility of in-person voting remained. More than 12 million voters participated in the intra-party elections, of which about 6 million voted online. United Russia went to the polls with the People's Programme, a policy document based on the President's April message and the wishes of the people who gathered traditionally - at meetings and through public reception parties - and on a specially created website, np.er.ru. More than 2 million people submitted their proposals for the country's development.

Another trend of the party in the elections was renewal. Already at the primaries stage, only half of the current State Duma deputies took part in them, but more than 30% of the participants were volunteers, social activists, and graduates of Russian and party personnel projects. The voter turnout was 51.72%. United Russia won 49.82% of the votes on party lists, which allowed it to receive 126 seats. The party managed to get another 198 mandates in single-mandate constituencies, which made it possible to get 324 seats in parliament and maintain a constitutional majority.

=== Electoral results ===
==== Presidential ====
| Election | Candidate | First round | | Second round | | Result |
| Election | Candidate | Votes | % | Votes | % | Result |
|---|---|---|---|---|---|---|
| 2004 | Supported Vladimir Putin (Note: Putin chose to run as an independent candidate while his campaign was endorsed and funded by United Russia.) | 49,565,238 | 71.31 | —N/a | | Won |
| 2008 | Dmitry Medvedev | 52,530,712 | 70.28 | —N/a | | Won |
| 2012 | Vladimir Putin | 46,602,075 | 63.60 | —N/a | | Won |
| 2018 | Supported Vladimir Putin | 56,430,712 | 76.69 | —N/a | | Won |
| 2024 | Supported Vladimir Putin | 76,277,708 | 88.48 | —N/a | | Won |

==== State Duma ====
| Election | Party leader | Party list leader | Votes | % | Seats | +/– | Rank | Government |
|---|---|---|---|---|---|---|---|---|
| 2003 | Boris Gryzlov | Boris Gryzlov | 22,779,279 | 37.57 | 223 / 450 | ▲122 (Note: Regarding the combined results of the Unity and Fatherland – All Russia) | ▲1st | Minority |
| 2007 | Boris Gryzlov | Vladimir Putin | 44,714,241 | 64.20 | 315 / 450 | ▲92 | 1st | Supermajority |
| 2011 | Vladimir Putin | Dmitry Medvedev | 32,379,135 | 49.32 | 238 / 450 | ▼77 | 1st | Majority |
| 2016 | Dmitry Medvedev | Dmitry Medvedev | 28,527,828 | 54.20 | 343 / 450 | ▲105 | 1st | Supermajority |
| 2021 | Dmitry Medvedev | Sergey Shoigu | 28,064,258 | 49.82 | 324 / 450 | ▼19 | 1st | Supermajority |
| 2026 | Dmitry Medvedev | Sergey Lavrov | 39,118,497 | 59.01 | 349 / 450 | ▲25 | 1st | Supermajority |

==== Regional ====
| Regional parliament | Election year and number of seats | | | | | | | | | | | Current place | | | Next elections |
| Regional parliament | Election year and number of seats | | | | | | | | | | | Places | % | # | Next elections |
| Regional parliament | 2011 | 2012 | 2013 | 2014 | 2015 | 2016 | 2017 | 2018 | 2019 | 2020 | 2021 | Places | % | # | Next elections |
|---|---|---|---|---|---|---|---|---|---|---|---|---|---|---|---|
| Chechnya Parliament of the Chechen Republic | 37 | | 37 | | | 37 | | | | | 37 | 37 / 41 | 90.2% | #1 | 2026 |
| Mordovia State Assembly of the Republic of Mordovia | 44 | | | | | 45 ▲ | | | | | 42 ▼ | 42 / 48 | 87.5% | #1 | 2026 |
| Ingushetia People's Assembly of the Republic of Ingushetia | 22 | | | | | 26▲ | | | | | 27▲ | 27 / 32 | 84.4% | #1 | 2026 |
| Khanty-Mansi Autonomous Okrug Duma of Khanty-Mansi Autonomous Okrug — Yugra | 25 | | | | | 28▲ | | | | | 29▲ | 29 / 35 | 82.9% | #1 | 2026 |
| Nizhny Novgorod Oblast Legislative Assembly of Nizhny Novgorod Oblast | 30 | | | | | 41▲ | | | | | 40▼ | 40 / 50 | 80% | #1 | 2026 |
| Adygea State Council of the Republic of Adygea | 41 | | | | | 39▼ | | | | | 40▲ | 40 / 50 | 80% | #1 | 2026 |
| Tambov Oblast Tambov Oblast Duma | 42 | | | | | 44▲ | | | | | 42▼ | 40 / 50 | 80% | #1 | 2026 |
| Tyumen Oblast Tyumen Oblast Duma | 38 | | | | | 39▲ | | | | | 38▼ | 38 / 48 | 79.2% | #1 | 2026 |
| Stavropol Krai Duma of Stavropol Krai | 37 | | | | | 39▲ | | | | | 39 | 39 / 50 | 78% | #1 | 2026 |
| Dagestan People's Assembly of the Republic of Dagestan | 62 | | | | | 72▲ | | | | | 69▼ | 69 / 90 | 76.7% | #1 | 2026 |
| Jewish Autonomous Oblast Legislative Assembly of the Jewish Autonomous Oblast | 14 | | | | | 13▼ | | | | | 14▲ | 14 / 19 | 73.7% | #1 | 2026 |
| Chukotka Duma of Chukotka Autonomous Okrug | 7 | | | | | 10▲ | | | | | 11▲ | 11 / 15 | 73.3% | #1 | 2026 |
| Pskov Oblast Pskov Oblast Assembly of Deputies | 26 | | | | | 33▲ | | | | | 19▼ | 19 / 26 | 73.1% | #1 | 2026 |
| Tver Oblast Legislative Assembly of Tver Oblast | 26 | | | | | 31▲ | | | | | 29▼ | 29 / 40 | 72.5% | #1 | 2026 |
| Kaliningrad Oblast Legislative Assembly of Kaliningrad Oblast | 22 | | | | | 29▲ | | | | | 29 | 29 / 40 | 72.5% | #1 | 2026 |
| Moscow Oblast Moscow Oblast Duma | 29 | | | | | 38▲ | | | | | 36▼ | 36 / 50 | 72% | #1 | 2026 |
| Samara Oblast Samara Regional Duma | 34 | | | | | 40▲ | | | | | 36▼ | 36 / 50 | 72% | #1 | 2026 |
| Novgorod Oblast Novgorod Oblast Duma | 15 | | | | | 21▲ | | | | | 23▲ | 23 / 32 | 71.9% | #1 | 2026 |
| Vologda Oblast Legislative Assembly of Vologda Oblast | 21 | | | | | 25▲ | | | | | 24▼ | 24 / 34 | 70.6% | #1 | 2026 |
| Leningrad Oblast Legislative Assembly of Leningrad Oblast | 31 | | | | | 40▲ | | | | | 35▼ | 35 / 50 | 70% | #1 | 2026 |
| Kursk Oblast Kursk Oblast Duma | 33 | | | | | 35▲ | | | | | 31▼ | 31 / 45 | 68.9% | #1 | 2026 |
| Murmansk Oblast Murmansk Oblast Duma | 22 | | | | | 25▲ | | | | | 25 | 25 / 36 | 69.4% | #1 | 2026 |
| Chuvashia State Council of the Chuvash Republic | 33 | | | | | 35▲ | | | | | 30▼ | 30 / 44 | 68.2% | #1 | 2026 |
| Amur Oblast Legislative Assembly of Amur Oblast | 17 | | | | | 25▲ | | | | | 18▼ | 18 / 27 | 66.7% | #1 | 2026 |
| Perm Krai Legislative Assembly of Perm Krai | 39 | | | | | 40▲ | | | | | 40 | 40 / 60 | 66.7% | #1 | 2026 |
| Sverdlovsk Oblast Legislative Assembly of Sverdlovsk Oblast | 29 | | | | | 35▲ | | | | | 33▼ | 33 / 50 | 66% | #1 | 2026 |
| Krasnoyarsk Krai Legislative Assembly of Krasnoyarsk Krai | 33 | | | | | 37▲ | | | | | 34▼ | 34 / 52 | 65.4% | #1 | 2026 |
| Tomsk Oblast Legislative Duma of Tomsk Oblast | 27 | | | | | 31▲ | | | | | 27▼ | 27 / 42 | 64.3% | #1 | 2026 |
| Kamchatka Legislative Assembly of Kamchatka Krai | 22 | | | | | 21▼ | | | | | 18▼ | 18 / 28 | 64.3% | #1 | 2026 |
| Astrakhan Oblast Duma of Astrakhan Oblast | 42 | | | | | 36▼ | | | | | 27▼ | 27 / 44 | 61.7% | #1 | 2026 |
| Orenburg Oblast Legislative Assembly of Orenburg Oblast | 32 | | | | | 34▲ | | | | | 29▼ | 29 / 47 | 61.7% | #1 | 2026 |
| Karelia Legislative Assembly of the Republic of Karelia | 19 | | | | | 24▲ | | | | | 22▼ | 22 / 36 | 61.1% | #1 | 2026 |
| Kirov Oblast Legislative Assembly of Kirov Oblast | 27 | | | | | 37▲ | | | | | 24▼ | 24 / 40 | 60% | #1 | 2026 |
| Saint Petersburg Legislative Assembly of Saint Petersburg | 20 | | | | | 36▲ | | | | | 30▼ | 30 / 50 | 60% | #1 | 2026 |
| Omsk Oblast Legislative Assembly of Omsk Oblast | 27 | | | | | 29▲ | | | | | 26▼ | 26 / 44 | 59.1% | #1 | 2026 |
| Primorsky Krai Legislative Assembly of Primorsky Krai | 23 | | | | | 25▲ | | | | | 23▼ | 23 / 40 | 57.5% | #1 | 2026 |
| Lipetsk Oblast Lipetsk Oblast Council of Deputies | 36 | | | | | 45▲ | | | | | 23▼ | 23 / 42 | 54.8% | #1 | 2026 |
| Oryol Oblast Oryol Oblast Council of People's Deputies | 31 | | | | | 34▲ | | | | | 27▼ | 27 / 50 | 54% | #1 | 2026 |
| Altai Krai Altai Krai Legislative Assembly | 48 | | | | | 42▼ | | | | | 31▼ | 31 / 68 | 45.6% | #1 | 2026 |
| Belgorod Oblast Belgorod Oblast Duma | 11 | | | | 29▲ | | | | | 44▲ | | 44 / 50 | 88% | #1 | 2025 |
| Voronezh Oblast Voronezh Oblast Duma | 48 | | | | 51▲ | | | | | 48▼ | | 48 / 56 | 85.7% | #1 | 2025 |
| Yamalo-Nenets Autonomous Okrug Legislative Assembly of the Yamalo-Nenets Autonomous Okrug | 18 | | | | 18 | | | | | 18 | | 18 / 22 | 81.8% | #1 | 2025 |
| Kurgan Oblast Kurgan Oblast Duma | 22 | | | | 28▲ | | | | | 27▼ | | 27 / 34 | 79.4% | #1 | 2025 |
| Magadan Oblast Magadan Oblast Duma | 5 | | | | 17▲ | | | | | 16▼ | | 16 / 21 | 76.2% | #1 | 2025 |
| Kaluga Oblast Legislative Assembly of Kaluga Oblast | 22 | | | | 31▲ | | | | | 29▼ | | 29 / 40 | 72.5% | #1 | 2025 |
| Ryazan Oblast Ryazan Oblast Duma | 25 | | | | 32▲ | | | | | 29▼ | | 29 / 40 | 72.5% | #1 | 2025 |
| Kostroma Oblast Kostroma Oblast Duma | 26 | | | | 27▲ | | | | | 24▼ | | 24 / 35 | 68.6% | #1 | 2025 |
| Komi State Council of the Komi Republic | 25 | | | | 24▼ | | | | | 20▼ | | 20 / 30 | 66.7% | #1 | 2025 |
| Novosibirsk Oblast Legislative Assembly of Novosibirsk Oblast | 50 | | | | 50 | | | | | 45▼ | | 45 / 76 | 59.2% | #1 | 2025 |
| Tuva Great Khural of Tuva | 29 | | | 31▲ | | | | | 30▼ | | | 30 / 32 | 93.8% | #1 | 2024 |
| Tula Oblast Tula Oblast Duma | 31 | | | 33▲ | | | | | 31▼ | | | 31 / 36 | 86.1% | #1 | 2024 |
| Tatarstan State Council of the Republic of Tatarstan | 87 | | | 83▼ | | | | | 85▲ | | | 85 / 100 | 85% | #1 | 2024 |
| Bryansk Oblast Bryansk Oblast Duma | 47 | | | 55▲ | | | | | 48▼ | | | 48 / 60 | 80% | #1 | 2024 |
| Crimea State Council of Crimea | 0 | | | 70▲ | | | | | 60▼ | | | 60 / 75 | 80% | #1 | 2024 |
| Kabardino-Balkaria Parliament of the Kabardino-Balkarian Republic | 52 | | | 50▼ | | | | | 50 | | | 50 / 70 | 71.4% | #1 | 2024 |
| Volgograd Oblast Volgograd Oblast Duma | ? | | | 32▲ | | | | | 28▼ | | 27▼ | 27 / 38 | 71.1% | #1 | 2024 |
| Mari El State Assembly of the Mari El Republic | 44 | | | 46▲ | | | | | 33▼ | | 35▲ | 35 / 50 | 70% | #1 | 2024 |
| Karachay-Cherkessia People's Assembly of Karachay-Cherkessia | 29 | | | 37▲ | | | | | 34▼ | | | 34 / 50 | 68% | #1 | 2024 |
| Altai State Assembly of the Altai Republic | 23 | | | 30▲ | | | | | 25▼ | | | 25 / 41 | 61% | #1 | 2024 |
| Nenets Autonomous Okrug Assembly of Deputies of the Nenets Autonomous Okrug | 6 | | | 13▲ | | | | | 11▼ | | | 11 / 19 | 57.9% | #1 | 2024 |
| Sevastopol Legislative Assembly of Sevastopol | 0 | | | 22▲ | | | | | 14▼ | | | 14 / 28 | 50% | #1 | 2024 |
| Moscow Moscow City Duma | 32 | | | 38▲ | | | | | 24▼ | | 20▼ | 20 / 45 | 44.4% | #1 | 2024 |
| Khabarovsk Krai Legislative Duma of Khabarovsk Krai | 18 | | | 30▲ | | | | | 2▼ | | 5▲ | 5 / 36 | 13.9% | #2 | 2024 |
| Kemerovo Oblast Legislative Assembly of Kemerovo Oblast | 17 | | 44▲ | | | | | 39▼ | | | | 39 / 46 | 84.8% | #1 | 2023 |
| Kalmykia People's Khural of Kalmykia | 17 | | 18▲ | | | | | 21▲ | | | | 21 / 27 | 77.8% | #1 | 2023 |
| Rostov Oblast Legislative Assembly of Rostov Oblast | 20 | | 52▲ | | | | | 46▼ | | | | 46 / 60 | 76.7% | #1 | 2023 |
| Bashkiria State Assembly of the Republic of Bashkortostan | 55 | | 88▲ | | | | | 79▼ | | | 78▼ | 78 / 110 | 70.9% | #1 | 2023 |
| Yakutia State Assembly of the Sakha Republic | 20 | | 51▲ | | | | | 42▼ | | | 47▲ | 47 / 70 | 67.1% | #1 | 2023 |
| Yaroslavl Oblast Yaroslavl Oblast Duma | 15 | | 39▲ | | | | | 32▼ | | | | 32 / 50 | 64% | #1 | 2023 |
| Buryatia People's Khural of the Republic of Buryatia | 22 | | 45▲ | | | | | 39▼ | | | | 39 / 66 | 59.1% | #1 | 2023 |
| Vladimir Oblast Legislative Assembly of Vladimir Oblast | 27 | | 32▲ | | | | | 23▼ | | | 22▼ | 22 / 38 | 57.9% | #1 | 2023 |
| Ivanovo Oblast Ivanovo Oblast Duma | 15 | | 22▲ | | | | | 15▼ | | | | 15 / 26 | 57.7% | #1 | 2023 |
| Smolensk Oblast Smolensk Oblast Duma | 15 | | 36▲ | | | | | 26▼ | | | | 26 / 48 | 54.2% | #1 | 2023 |
| Arkhangelsk Oblast Arkhangelsk Oblast Assembly of Deputies | ? | | 43▲ | | | | | 25▼ | | | | 25 / 47 | 53.2% | #1 | 2023 |
| Ulyanovsk Oblast Legislative Assembly of Ulyanovsk Oblast | 10 | | 31▲ | | | | | 17▼ | | | | 17 / 36 | 47.2% | #1 | 2023 |
| Zabaykalsky Krai Legislative Assembly of Zabaykalsky Krai | 14 | | 36▲ | | | | | 21▼ | | | | 21 / 50 | 42% | #1 | 2023 |
| Khakassia Supreme Council of the Republic of Khakassia | 53 | | 34▼ | | | | | 17▼ | | | 21▲ | 21 / 50 | 42% | #1 | 2023 |
| Irkutsk Oblast Legislative Assembly of Irkutsk Oblast | 15 | | 29▲ | | | | | 17▼ | | | | 17 / 45 | 37.8% | #2 | 2023 |
| Penza Oblast Legislative Assembly of Penza Oblast | 12 | 34▲ | | | | | 32▼ | | | | | 32 / 36 | 88.9% | #1 | 2022 |
| Krasnodar Krai Legislative Assembly of Krasnodar Krai | 25 | 95▲ | | | | | 60▼ | | | | | 60 / 70 | 85.7% | #1 | 2022 |
| Saratov Oblast Saratov Oblast Duma | 14 | 43▲ | | | | | 36▼ | | | | | 36 / 45 | 80% | #1 | 2022 |
| Udmurtia State Council of the Udmurt Republic | 31 | 67▲ | | | | | 47▼ | | | | | 47 / 60 | 78.3% | #1 | 2022 |
| Sakhalin Sakhalin Oblast Duma | 11 | 21▲ | | | | | 19▼ | | | | 20▲ | 20 / 28 | 71.4% | #1 | 2022 |
| North Ossetia Parliament of the Republic of North Ossetia–Alania | 25 | 45▲ | | | | | 46▲ | | | | | 46 / 70 | 65.7% | #1 | 2022 |

=== Practice of nominating formally independent candidates ===
Since 2009, in many regions, the practice of United Russia supporting formally independent candidates has occurred in local elections. Political scientist Sergei Dyachkov believes this is a well-thought-out tactic related to the fear of candidates losing votes due to dissatisfaction with the authorities' actions in the context of the financial-economic crisis. According to Roman Prytkov, a journalist for the Agency for Federal Investigation, the candidates who represent the authorities believe that it has become unprofitable to go to the polls under the banner of United Russia because it will deprive them of part of the vote. Kommersant believes that "large cities have become an electoral problem for United Russia - candidates prefer not to advertise their party affiliation." Candidates nominated by United Russia are reportedly often embarrassed about their party affiliation and try not to advertise it when meeting with voters and do not indicate it in their campaign materials.

In the mayoral elections in Khimki in 2012, the party supported a self-nominated member of United Russia, Oleg Shakhov, who acted as mayor. In the municipal elections in 125 intra-city municipalities of the city of Moscow on 4 March 2012, candidates (members of the United Russia party and those previously elected from the United Russia party) were nominated independently. Not a single official candidate from the United Russia party was nominated. In June 2013, Member of the Supreme Council of United Russia Sergey Sobyanin, proposed by United Russia in 2010 to President Medvedev as a candidate for the mayor of Moscow, went to early re-elections as an independent candidate. United Russia considered that "Sergei Sobyanin's decision not to run for mayor from the party was the right one, because in this way he would be able to gather representatives of the "most diverse" forces", and promised to provide support in any case.

On 8 September 2013, simultaneously with the election of the mayor of Moscow, elections of municipal deputies were held in several districts, part of the territory of the Moscow Oblast that was recently annexed to the capital. As in 2012, United Russia will not directly participate in these elections. Candidates affiliated with this party or with district administrations will go to the polls as "self-nominated" because of, according to an unnamed Gazeta.Ru source, "the poor rating of United Russia both in Moscow and the Moscow Oblast."

According to Aleksey Melnikov, an author of Gazeta.ru, "the type of "self-nominated" that has appeared in the political life of Russia, diligently hiding the United Russia party card and the pocket of a government faithful, shows a crisis ... when the new mask of the All-Russia People's Front has not yet been put on, while it lies on the shelf, and the old one, the so-called "United Russia", has almost been taken off." In November 2019, the secretary of the general council of the party, Andrey Turchak, said that in the upcoming elections to the State Duma in 2021, United Russia would nominate its own candidates and stop providing support for self-nominated United Russia members since "United Russia should not be 'ashamed' of their party affiliation, but, on the contrary, be proud of it."

=== Preliminary voting ===
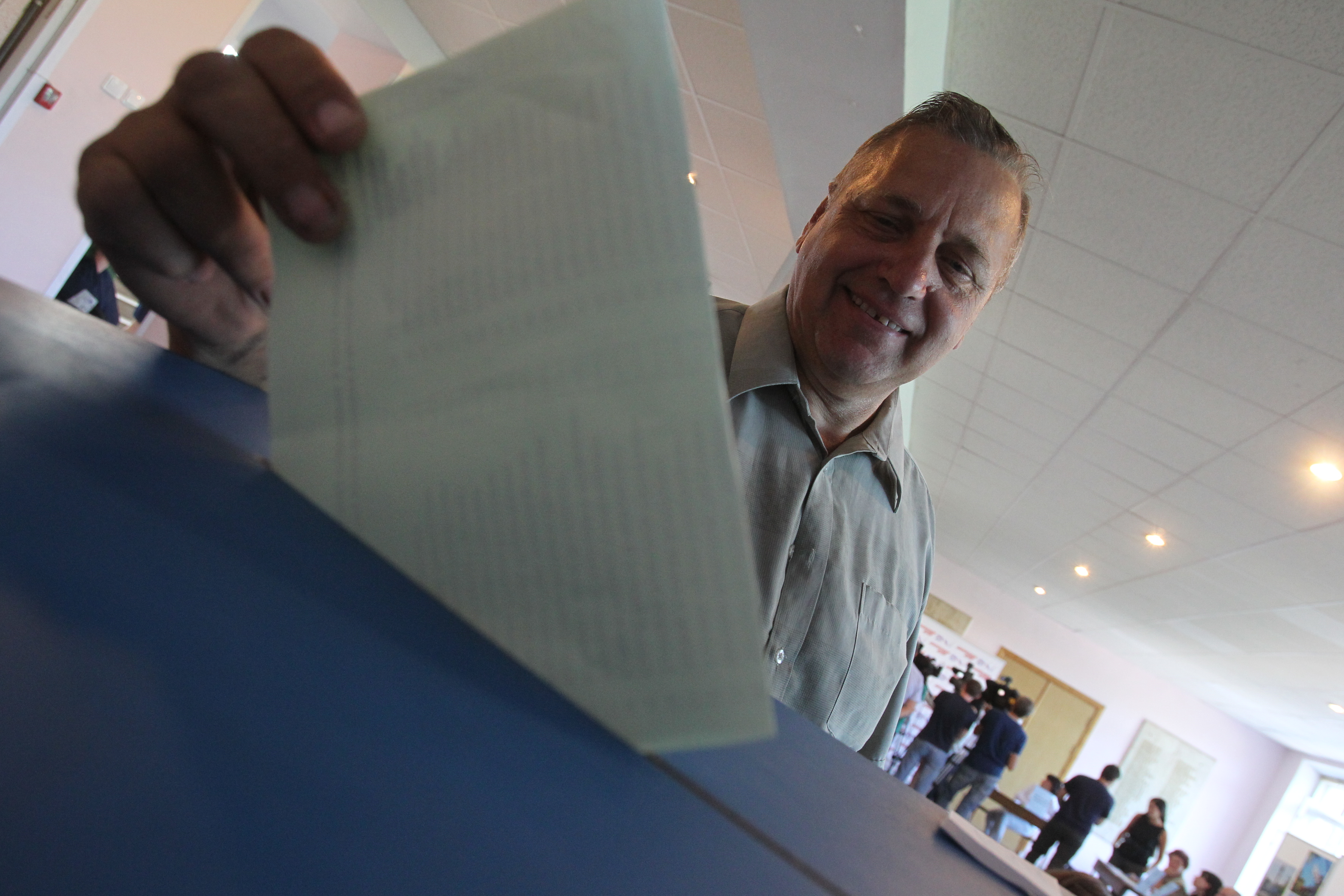
Participant of the primaries of United Russia and ONF in Nizhny Novgorod

Preliminary voting of United Russia (colloquially known as "primaries") is a procedure for intra-party voting on candidates for subsequent nomination from United Russia, its regional branches as candidates for deputies of the legislative bodies of state power of the constituent entities of the Russian Federation. Preliminary voting is organized and conducted to provide opportunities for citizens of the Russian Federation to participate in the political life of society. According to the results of the preliminary voting in 2011, organized by United Russia and the ONF for the first time in Russian political history, more than 150 non-partisan candidates were included in the electoral lists of United Russia, and the successful holding of the primaries prompted Vladimir Putin to propose legislatively making this procedure mandatory for all political parties.

Russian Public Opinion Research Center (VTsIOM) Director General Valery Fyodorov notes that, according to an August 2011 VTsIOM poll, about a third of Russians were aware of the party and ONF primaries, and United Russia "tried to turn an intra-party ... event into a topic of interest to those who are not only members of United Russia, but are often generally apolitical." After the primaries were held, Vladimir Putin said in August 2011 that he considered it expedient to hold primaries for all parties and extend this practice to the regional and municipal levels. On 24 August, acting Vice Speaker of the State Duma Oleg Morozov announced that in September, United Russia intends to submit to the State Duma a bill introducing mandatory primaries. Since 2016, preliminary voting in the party has been held annually. From 2016 to 2020, it lasted one day; in 2021, the practice of weekly voting was introduced, with voters making their choice electronically for six days. United Russia remains the only political force using the preliminary voting mechanism.

==== Single Advance Voting Day 2021 ====
The preliminary voting held by United Russia on 24–30 May 2021 throughout the country was the largest in the history of this procedure. It was attended by about 11 million people (more than 10 percent of the total number of voters in the country). The average age of the candidates was 41 years.

==== Electronic preliminary voting ====
Electronic preliminary voting is a form of remote voting. For this purpose, a special site for preliminary voting, adapted for smartphone use, has been created. In addition to the convenience for voters, the site allows candidates to independently fill out their pages: post news, videos, and photos, and distribute their pages. The personal account is integrated with the leading social networks. In 2018, as an experiment in several regions, United Russia held the first electronic voting. 140,000 people took part in the voting.

In 2021, United Russia's preliminary voting occurred online from 24 to 30 May nationwide. In total, 6,031,800 people took part in the preliminary electronic voting. Access to voting on the site is provided after authorization through the State Services portal. To prevent fraud, United Russia independently developed and implemented special software to simplify the monitoring of electronic voting by all interested participants in the procedure.

== Current status ==
=== Federal Assembly ===
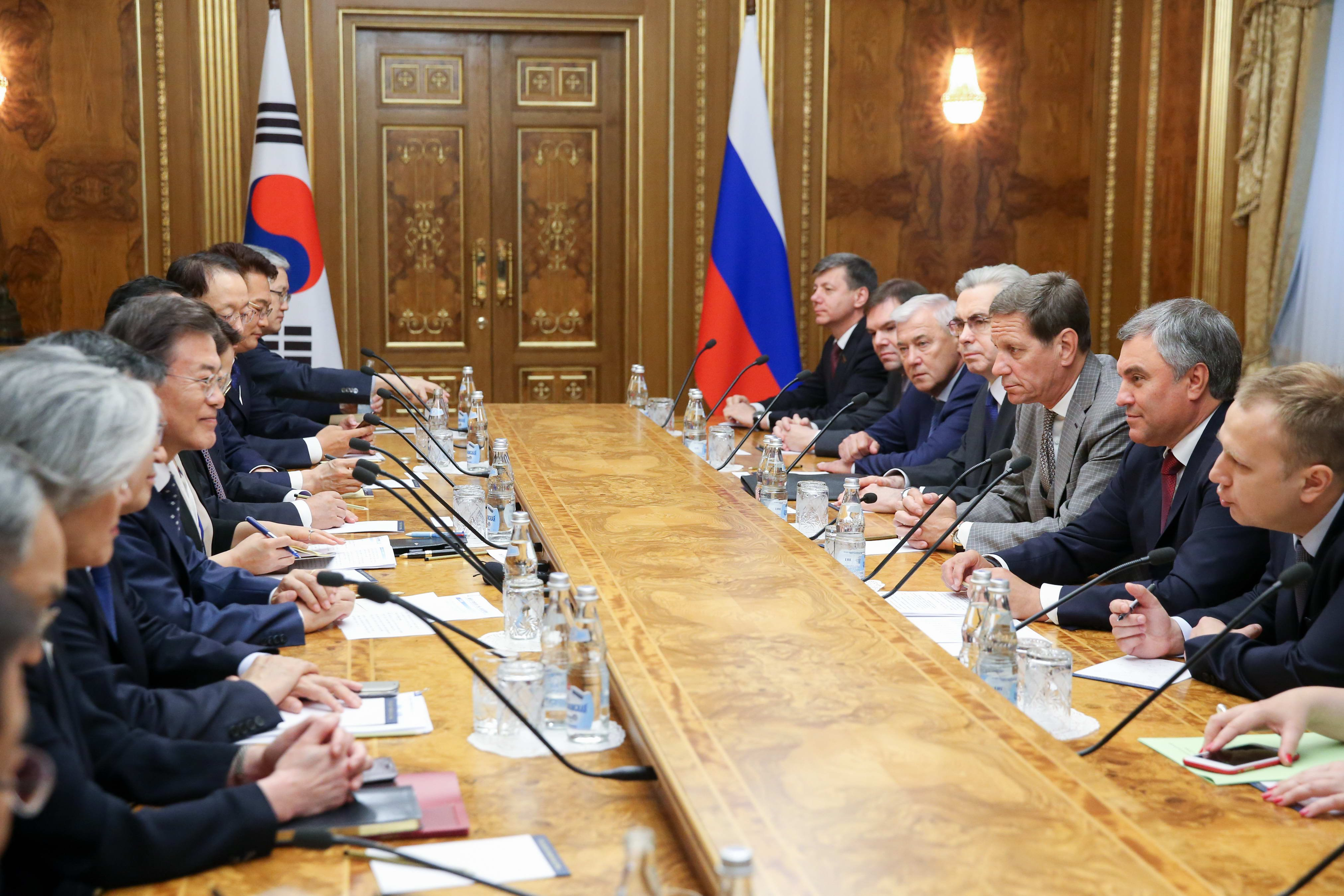
Vyacheslav Volodin with South Korean President Moon Jae-in in the State Duma on 21 June 2018

United Russia currently holds 340 of the 450 seats in the State Duma. It heads all five of the Duma's commissions, and holds 14 of the 26 committee chairmanships, and 10 of the 16 seats in the Council of Duma, the Duma's steering committee. The speaker of the Duma is United Russia's Vyacheslav Volodin. The party has only informal influence in the upper house, the Federation Council, as the Council has rejected the use of political factions in decision making.

=== Party membership ===
In 2013, United Russia claimed a membership of 2 million. According to a study conducted by Timothy J. Colton, Henry E. Hale and Michael McFaul after the March 2008 presidential elections, 30% of the Russian population are loyalists of the party. As of 2010, 26% of party members were pensioners, students and temporarily unemployed, 21.2% worked in education, 20.9% in industry, 13.2% were in the civil service and worked in government, 8% worked in healthcare, 4% were entrepreneurs, and about 4% worked in the art field.

== Party platform ==
Political positions of Russian parties, by political scientists Anuradha M. Chenoy and Rajan Kumar

The party's official ideological platform, described by its leaders as centrist, conservative, and Russian conservative, suggests a statist stance and declared pragmatism. Researchers also singled out in the party Russian integralism, Eurasianism, statism, and Putinism. Political observers primarily classify the party as centrist, while others also describe it as centre-right, or right-wing. It has also been described as a big tent party, the party in power, or the presidential party.

According to the party's 2003 political manifesto, The Path of National Success, the party's goal is to unite the responsible political forces of the country, aiming to minimize the differences between rich and poor, young and old, state, business and society. The economy should combine state regulation and market freedoms, with the benefits of further growth distributed mostly to the less fortunate. The party rejects left-wing and right-wing ideologies in favour of "political centrism" that could unite all sections of society. In addition, the official party platform emphasizes pragmatism and anti-radicalism. The party regards itself as one of the heirs to Russia's tradition of statehood, both tsarist and Soviet eras. United Russia's long-time moniker is "the party of real deeds".

In April 2005, State Duma Chairman Boris Gryzlov announced that United Russia was choosing a socially conservative policy. Gryzlov stressed that United Russia opposes "both various kinds of communist restorationism and ultra-liberalism". He criticized the supporters of the liberal theory, which, in his opinion, "reinforces the advantages of the strong and rich, gives them a head start, makes it difficult for new people and enterprises to enter." Since 2006, when Vladislav Surkov introduced the term sovereign democracy, many party figureheads have used the term. Former President and Prime Minister Dmitry Medvedev has criticised the term. United Russia voted against the Council of Europe resolution 1481 (Need for international condemnation of crimes of communist governments).

The party supports the policies of the current government and the president. United Russia went to the 2007 parliamentary elections with slogans supporting the course of President Vladimir Putin and Putin's plan. In 2009, the party proclaimed Russian conservatism as its official ideology. This was stated with complete clarity and certainty at the 11th Party Congress in St. Petersburg. On 21 November, the program document of the party was adopted, which stated: "The ideology of the Party is Russian conservatism."

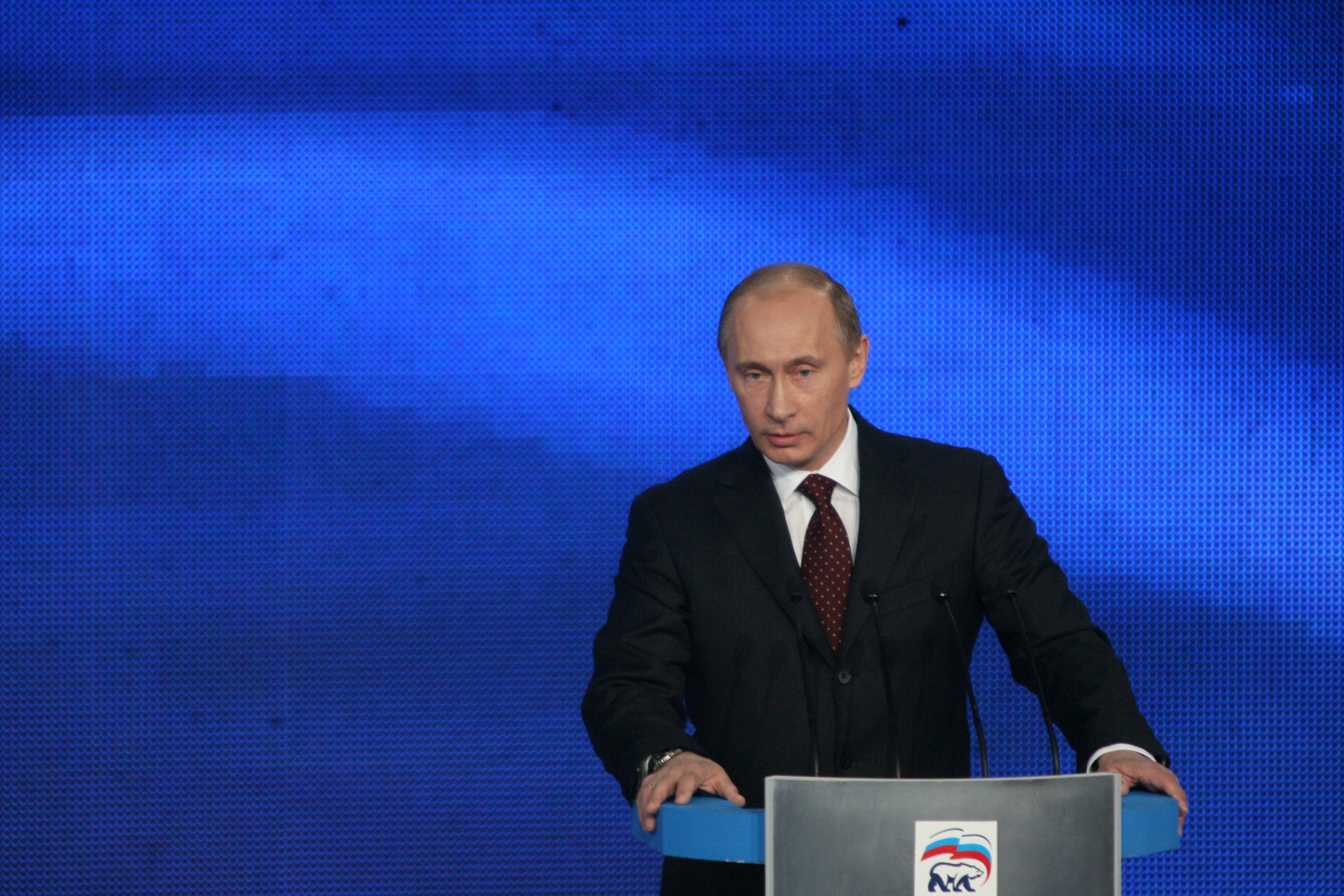
Speech by Party Chairman Vladimir Putin at the 11th Congress of United Russia, 21 November 2009

The program document of the United Russia party notes: "Our absolute priority is people. This priority was gained by Russia - for centuries the price of human life was almost negligible. All human rights proclaimed by the Constitution and international law have the same, unconditional and supreme value for us: whether it be freedom of speech, freedom of movement, access to cultural values, the right to housing or social security."

The party has promoted explicitly conservative policies in social, cultural and political matters, at home and abroad. Putin has attacked globalism and economic liberalism. Putin has promoted new think tanks that bring together like-minded intellectuals and writers. For example, the Izborsky Club, founded in 2012 by Alexander Prokhanov, stresses Russian nationalism, restoring Russia's historical greatness, and systematic opposition to liberal ideas and policies. Vladislav Surkov, a senior government official, has been one of the key ideologists during Putin's presidency.

In 2015, United Russia changed its ideology to liberal conservatism, which is right-leaning centrism. The change in United Russia's positions was due to the economic crisis in Russia at the time. The charter states the main values of the party:

- well-being of a person: his health and longevity, social security, decent wages and opportunities for entrepreneurship, accessible infrastructure and a comfortable environment, freedom of creativity and spiritual search;
- unity and sovereignty of the country: common history and common victories, centuries-old experience of interethnic and interfaith harmony, political, legal, cultural unity of the country, intolerance to attempts to revise and distort the history of Russia, to any manifestations that destroy our country, to attempts of external interference in the life of the state;
- leadership and development of Russia: in improving the quality of life of people, in education and science, in modernizing the economy and infrastructure, in ensuring defense and security.

To comply with these values, per the charter, the party must:

- to be a team of like-minded people united for the sake of improving the lives of people and the breakthrough development of the country;
- to be the party of the popular majority - citizens of the country supporting the President of the Russian Federation and his strategic course;
- openly, honestly and professionally represent the interests of citizens in government and local self-government bodies;
- uncompromisingly and effectively control the fulfillment of the tasks set by the President of the Russian Federation, compliance with the legislation of the Russian Federation;
- to be a political force that creates the basis for the future of Russia, supports and promotes the initiatives and projects of entrepreneurs, scientists, social activists, young leaders, advanced ideas, technologies and innovative solutions;
- protect human dignity and justice in society.

The United Russia party is also ideologically heterogeneous. It has a left, socially conservative "wing" and a right, liberal-conservative "wing". There is also a national-conservative group in the party. They are officially recognized parts of the party as debating clubs. These are the "liberal" club "November 4", the "social" club "Center for Social Conservative Policy", as well as the State Patriotic Club. In cultural and social affairs, United Russia has collaborated closely with the Russian Orthodox Church. Mark Woods provides specific examples of how the Church under Patriarch Kirill of Moscow has backed the expansion of Russian power into Crimea and eastern Ukraine. More broadly, The New York Times reported in September 2016 how that Church's policy prescriptions support the Kremlin's appeal to social conservatives:

A fervent foe of homosexuality and any attempt to put individual rights above those of family, community or nation, the Russian Orthodox Church helps project Russia as the natural ally of all those who pine for a more secure, illiberal world free from the tradition-crushing rush of globalization, multiculturalism and women's and gay rights.

In 2017, political scientists Anuradha M. Chenoy and Rajan Kumar described the party as centrist by Russian standards, and characterized its political agenda as follows:

The United Russia Party supports state capitalism, soft nationalism and sovereign democracy. It campaigned for harsher actions against the recalcitrant governors and demanded centralisation of federal powers. In foreign policy, it promotes Eurasianism, closer alliance with China, countering the NATO and protecting Russian diaspora in the post-Soviet states. The Duma, dominated by the United Russia, swiftly ratified the inclusion of Crimea into Russia and endorsed the military intervention in Syria.

On 21 October 2021, Putin, speaking at the plenary session of the Valdai Discussion Club, announced the principles of the ideology of "healthy conservatism" at the heart of Russia's approaches. According to Putin, a conservative approach does not mean "thoughtless guarding", fear of change and playing for hold or "locking in one's own shell." According to the president, moderate conservatism is a reliance on traditions, the preservation and growth of the population, a real assessment of oneself and others, the precise alignment of a system of priorities, the correlation of what is necessary and what is possible, the prudent formulation of goals, and the principled rejection of extremism as a way of action.

=== "Putin's Plan" ===
Putin's Plan is an ideological cliché introduced to refer to the political and economic program of Russia's second president, Vladimir Putin, for later use in United Russia's election campaign in the 2007 Duma elections. It was used in the slogan "Putin's plan is Russia's victory" on the cover of a brochure and outdoor campaign advertising. In the election program of the United Russia party for the 2007 parliamentary elections, the "Putin's Plan" was formulated as follows:

- further development of Russia as a unique civilization, protection of the common cultural space, the Russian language, our historical traditions;
- increasing the competitiveness of the economy through entering the innovative path of development, supporting science, developing infrastructure, increasing investment, primarily in high technology, in the industry - the locomotives of economic growth;
- ensuring a new quality of life for citizens by continuing the implementation of priority national projects, further and significant increases in wages, pensions and scholarships, assisting citizens in solving the housing problem;
- support for civil society institutions, stimulation of social mobility and activity, promotion of public initiatives;
- strengthening the sovereignty of Russia, the country's defense capability, ensuring for it a worthy place in the multipolar world.

Later, an illustrated brochure "Putin's Plan" was published and distributed free of charge as an election advertisement for United Russia.

=== Sovereign democracy ===
In February 2006, the party's official website published a transcript of a speech by Vladislav Surkov, deputy head of the presidential administration of Russia, to the audience of the United Russia Center for Party Education and Personnel Training, in which he made an attempt "to describe recent history in assessments and from the point of view that generally corresponds to the course of the president, and through this to formulate our main approaches to what was before and what will happen to us in the future."

Surkov's party was tasked with "not just winning the parliamentary elections in 2007, but thinking about and doing everything to ensure the dominance of the party for at least 10-15 years to come." In order to maintain positions, Surkov advised members to "master the ideology" - and to do this, create "permanent groups for propaganda support in the fight against political opponents" in the regions. The term "sovereign democracy" became the core concept of Surkov's ideological platform. Subsequently, Russian President Dmitry Medvedev noted that he supported "genuine democracy ... or simply democracy in the presence of a comprehensive state sovereignty."

=== Federal party projects ===
Federal party projects were created on 13 November 2013. A party project is understood as a set of measures at the federal level, united by common goals, executors, and implementation deadlines, ensuring the achievement of the goals and objectives set by the party. The purpose of the federal project is to implement in more than one constituent entity of the Russian Federation initiative projects and programs relevant to all citizens of the Russian Federation aimed at modernizing primary health care, building new schools and kindergartens, developing road infrastructure, building sports and recreation centres and developing children's sports, development of patriotism and cultural values in society, development of an accessible barrier-free environment, assistance to the older generation, improvement of yards and public spaces, solving environmental problems, and development of the village and industry. To date, there are 15 federal party projects:

- Safe Roads
- Urban Environment
- Children's Sports
- One Country – Accessible Environment
- Healthy Future
- Historical memory
- A strong family
- Culture of a Small Motherland
- Locomotives of growth
- People's Control
- New school
- Russian Village
- Older generation
- Clean Country
- School of a competent consumer

=== Party position on major social issues ===
On 19 June 2018, deputies of the State Duma from United Russia almost unanimously (except for Natalia Poklonskaya) supported in the first reading the government bill on raising the retirement age, rejected by the majority of Russians and all opposition factions. According to earlier statements by its leaders, the party was categorically against raising the retirement age, and against lengthening the working week and increasing housing and communal services tariffs relative to inflation. In the early 2010s, United Russia noted that the achievement of their team's work in power was the growth in the income level of Russian citizens by 2.4 times and the income level of pensioners by 3.3 times over ten years.

==== Socially significant initiatives and bills of 2021 ====
- At the initiative of United Russia, disability pensions and other social benefits are now assigned on an unclaimed basis.
- In May 2021, a law was passed to combat "black collectors". Illegal debt recovery activities are punishable by imprisonment for up to 12 years.
- From 20 May 2021, parents can refund 50% of the cost of their children's trips to health camps. The refund period is, at most, five days. One of the main conditions is that tickets must be paid for with a Mir card (the program was valid until the end of 2021).
- In June 2021, a law amended by United Russia was adopted on free connection to gas (the amendments aim at solve the task set by Putin - to bring gas to each section free of charge).
- In June 2021, the State Duma unanimously adopted a United Russia law on protecting the minimum income of citizens. The guaranteed minimum income will not be taken away from debtors.
- Starting 1 July 2021, new payments have been started for women in difficult situations registered in the first 12 weeks of pregnancy and for single parents raising children aged 8 to 17 years.
- In July 2021, the government agreed to United Russia's proposal to compensate the gasification costs to people who paid for gas supply to households before the start of the social gasification program.
- In September 2021, a package of bills initiated by United Russia was adopted, including paid sick leave for caring for a child up to eight years old in the amount of 100% of average earnings, on a "garage amnesty", on the possibility of challenging fines through State Services, and on remote sale of medicines.
- In September 2021, a group of senators and deputies from United Russia submitted to the State Duma a bill on the free hospitalization of disabled children with their parents. The government has approved the document.
- In November 2021, the State Duma unanimously adopted in the first reading the draft law of United Russia on the abolition of mandatory technical inspection.
- In November 2021, a law was adopted to abolish personal income tax on the sale of housing for families with children.
- In 2021, at the initiative of United Russia, the government expanded the preferential mortgage program. Now it extends to private homes.
- In December 2021, a law on the indexation of maternity capital was adopted: its size will be reviewed annually, considering inflation growth rates.
- In December 2021, at the initiative of United Russia, the bill on the use of QR codes in transport was withdrawn from consideration.
- On 17 December 2021, the State Duma adopted in the second reading a bill obliging owners of industrial enterprises to eliminate the consequences of a negative environmental impact. The norms of the bill are proposed to be extended to include coal mines.

==== Amendments to the 2022–2024 budget ====
When considering the draft budget for 2022–2024, the United Russia faction proposed the following amendments:

- On the provision of housing for disabled people registered before 1 January 2005
- On the system of long-term care for the elderly and disabled
- On subsidies for state support of certain public and other non-profit organizations
- On ensuring the availability of air transportation to the Far East for citizens
- On providing persons infected with the human immunodeficiency virus, including in combination with hepatitis B and C viruses, with antiviral drugs for medical use
- On the procurement, storage, transportation and safety of donated blood and its components
- On the development of highways of regional importance
- On the implementation of the program for the integrated development of rural areas
- On financial support for the provision of universal communication services
- On the overhaul of university dormitories
- On equipping sports infrastructure facilities with sports and technological equipment for the creation of open-type sports and recreation complexes (FOKOT) in rural areas
- On amendments to youth policy

In total, the deputies of the United Russia faction proposed to increase government spending in 2022-2024 by 107.6 billion rubles. The priorities were to support families with children and help the most vulnerable categories of citizens. The proposed amendments were taken into account when the budget was adopted.

=== Manifestos ===
==== Draft Manifesto 2002 ====
On 23 December 2002, Nezavisimaya Gazeta published a draft manifesto for United Russia, which, in particular, contained the following promises:

Our specific program is this: after winning the elections in December 2003, immediately in 2004, we will begin:

- an energy complex modernization program
- mass construction of individual housing
- a program for the development of a new transport network in Russia
- a technological revolution in Russian agriculture
- the rapid growth of incomes of all categories of citizens

As a result,

- in 2004 every resident of Russia will pay for heat and electricity half as much as now
- in 2005 every citizen of Russia will receive his share from the use of Russia's natural resources
- in 2006 everyone will have a job according to their profession
- by 2008, each family will have its own comfortable housing worthy of the third millennium, regardless of the level of current income
- by 2008 Chechnya and the entire North Caucasus will become the tourist and resort "Mecca" of Russia
- by 2010 the St. Petersburg-Anadyr, Tokyo-Vladivostok-Brest and other transport routes will be built
- by 2017 Russia will be the leader of world politics and economy

Are you saying it can't be? It will be! We, the United Russia party, will do it! For a thousand years, Russia has been the main element of world politics and economics. Will you say that the country is in decline and this will never happen again? We have social forces ready to support the revival of Russia. We are on the verge of explosive growth of the national economy and we will take this step. In 15 years, Russia will be the leader of the world economy and politics. And the whole world will see it.

Did the Russian bear sleep for a long time? We will wake him up. Is everyone waiting for the Russian Miracle? We will create it. Need a national idea? We have it.

— Maxim Glikin, Olga Tropkina. The party in power will provide everyone with housing // Nezavisimaya Gazeta 2002-12-23

United Russia did not accept this draft manifesto, but political opponents of United Russia repeatedly used it to illustrate the party's activities. United Russia supporters claim that this manifesto is fake. According to Dmitry Rogozin, "this is the most real final document of the seminar of the leaders of the regional branches of United Russia, proposed for discussion by the general council of this party." Political journalist Oleg Kashin pointed to a discussion in his blog dated 17 January 2003 of the draft manifesto, located on the official website of United Russia. Later, Kashin wrote that "Alexander Bespalov, who at that time headed the General Council of United Russia, soon lost his post and, as they said, the formal reason for this was precisely that slanderous manifesto, which since then United Russia has preferred not to remember, and its opponents, on the contrary, like to remember."

Also noteworthy is the version according to which the draft is both a fake in the sense that it was not officially adopted and genuine in the sense that it was prepared by a group of United Russia political technologists, and the publication of the "raw" draft manifesto was a reflection of the intra-party struggle. Political technologist Vyacheslav Smirnov, who in 2002 was a member of the campaign headquarters of United Russia, notes that the text was authored by a group led by the St. Petersburg sociologist Yu. Krizhanskaya:

This creation was written in front of my eyes in December 2002 by the St. Petersburg group of Krizhanskaya, who was Bespalov's deputy for the CEC. And it was sent out as a draft. The scandal was funny. At the General Council, the question was, "Who will be responsible for this in four years?" This "program" was tied to the Fusenko nozzle (it seems so) and the new physics of Dzhabrail Baziev (energy of the type), Yunitsky's autoplanes and string transport (this is exactly what the Brest-St. Petersburg-Anadyr string highway meant) <...> So this project had a big request for budget money. And they seem to have managed to convey it to the head of state. I don't know if Putin laughed or sobbed…

Political scientist Pavel Danilin noted:

I don't know whether Putin laughed or sobbed, but Bespalov not only sent this document as a draft for review to regional offices but also, proud of himself, leaked it to Nezavisimaya Gazeta. And on 23 December 2002, Maxim Glikin and Olga Tropkina published the article "The Bears are for tourism in Chechnya!". The article says bluntly: "The editors of NG got a document that clearly claims to be a sensation. This is a draft manifesto of United Russia, which was discussed last Saturday at a meeting of the central political council of the party."

It was Bespalov's swan song since, by that time, Boris Gryzlov (head of the Supreme Council of the party) had come to lead the party. As early as 20 November 2002, Bespalov's powers as chairman of the General Council were curtailed. On 27 February 2003, he was fired at the meeting that Glikin and Tropkina wrote about, which actually took place. A month before their article, a decision was made on Bespalov's project that this project would discredit the party, and Bespalov should leave on good terms, which is what was done.

All this time, Gryzlov's team was preparing for the Second Party Congress and was preparing his program speech, which was adopted as the manifesto "The Path of National Success". I would like to draw your attention to the fact that program documents and manifestos are approved by the party congress in accordance with the charter. The congress was held on 29 March 2003 and approved a real manifesto, "The Path of National Success". No projects were considered on it. Bespalov's draft document was buried and forgotten a long time ago.

— Volodin, Oleg (19 October 2011). "Правда о 'манифесте Единой России от 2003 года'" [The Truth About the 2003 United Russia Manifesto]. PolitOnline (in Russian). Archived from the original on 4 March 2021.

==== Manifesto 2003 ====
The manifesto, approved by the 2nd Congress of the All-Russian Political Party "Unity and Fatherland - United Russia" on 29 March 2003, did not contain specific dates, figures and promises, but in spirit and name "The Path of National Success" corresponded to the project.

The goal is clear - any transformations in the economy should serve to qualitatively increase prosperity, the rapid growth of real incomes, and ensure the highest social standards of life for our fellow citizens. Transformations in the economy are a tool for building a genuine social state in Russia.

The revenues of the state must be placed in strict dependence on the incomes of its citizens. It is necessary to create a system based on the law of the distribution of state revenues in the interests of the majority of its population. This does not mean "take away and divide." This means producing, receiving income, paying everyone a decent reward for their work, and providing targeted assistance to those in need. This is the only way to form the majority that does not need daily state care, but provides its own prosperity and increases the prosperity of the state. This is the only way to overcome the oppression of the material disadvantage of a significant number of Russians.

The party considers it necessary to simultaneously solve the problems of developing a modern market economy and building a new, effective system of social protection. This means that the country's economy should be developed on a competitive basis, and the results of its development should be used on the basis of social justice.

A breakthrough in the economy is possible only when an optimal model of its development is formed.

This model should combine the further development of today's competitive sectors of the Russian economy, in particular, raw materials, with the modernization of high-tech sectors.

This is the creation of a full-fledged domestic market and the stimulation of domestic demand, and hence the high incomes of citizens that ensure this demand.

This is a decisive "inventory" of the country's production potential. We have no right to develop something that burdens the economy, hinders its development and has no prospects for competition in world markets. At the same time, the very geopolitical position of Russia requires the support of those sectors that ensure its security - military, food, environmental, information. The modern accounting approach to the economy should give way to strategic planning, the ability to see the economic perspective and unite the country's efforts around real points of economic growth.

This is the recognition of the unconditional priority of the development of all forms of organization of agriculture, the restoration of its production potential through a reasonable combination of budget support with market regulation instruments.

This is not only high rates of economic growth, but also the realization of the benefits of entrepreneurial freedom, primarily for the economically active part of the population - representatives of small and medium-sized businesses as the basis for the social stability of society and the formation of the Russian middle class.

This is an effective regulatory role of the state in the economy, which is the key to its successful development. We intend to pursue a policy of low taxes and high incomes. But for this it is necessary to combine the freedom of the market with the instruments of state regulation - budgetary and financial, monetary, legal, tax, rent. This is a budgetary policy based not only on the needs of the country, but also on protecting the budget of every Russian family.

This is freedom and order in the economy, when the state creates strict rules that ensure that every person is free to take care of his own destiny. Economically successful Russia is a country in which the principle of "well-being for all" is implemented. It is not very important for us what analysts and journalists will call our party.

They call us the "party of power" - we answer that we will definitely become the ruling party, the party of the new power.

We are called supporters of Putin's reforms - we answer that these reforms are vital for Russia.

— "The Path of National Success", manifesto of the United Russia party. Approved by the 2nd Congress of the All-Russian Political Party "Unity and Fatherland" - United Russia on 29 March 2003.

This document ended with the program slogan "We believe in ourselves and in Russia!".

=== Electorate ===
According to studies, United Russia voters in 2006 were younger and more market-oriented than the average voter. The party's electorate includes a substantial share of state employees, pensioners and military personnel who are dependent on the state for their livelihood. Sixty-four percent of United Russia supporters are female. In the run-up to the 2011 Duma elections, it was reported that support for United Russia was growing among young people.

=== Foreign opinions ===
Foreign media and observers describe United Russia as a pure "presidential party", with the main goal of securing the power of the Russian President in the Russian parliament. The vast majority of officeholders in Russia are members of the party, hence it is sometimes described as a "public official party" or "administration party". Due to this, it is also often labelled the "Party of Power".

==== International activities and alliances ====
United Russia is active in international activities, develops and strengthens ties with political parties of other states, and establishes constructive interaction and cooperation with them. To date, the party has 58 agreements on interaction and cooperation. In pursuance of the provisions of these agreements, constant bilateral inter-party consultations, exchange of delegations, participation in the work of congresses of partner parties, and holding forums and round tables are carried out. Joint consultations and exchange of information take place on the most pressing issues of our time, on the issues of bilateral relations, exchange of experience in the areas of party building, organizational work, youth policy, the use of new information and communication technologies in political activities, work in parliament and government, and other areas of mutual interest. The most important vector of international work is interaction with the political parties of the CIS countries. Contacts are also effectively developing on the Eastern Track, where strategic partnership relations have been established with the ruling parties of China and Vietnam. One of the most important areas of interaction between Russia and China is the cooperation between United Russia and the Chinese Communist Party (CCP). An important format of inter-party interaction, fixed in the text of the bilateral protocol, is the holding of dialogue meetings and the forum United Russia-CCP, regularly organized since 2007, alternately on the territory of Russia and China. In 2007, United Russia signed a cooperation agreement with the Kazakh Nur Otan party, as well as the Ukrainian Party of Regions; in 2008, with the South Ossetian Unity Party; in 2010, with the Mongolian People's Party, which in the Soviet years collaborated with the CPSU, as well as the Serbian Progressive Party, the Kyrgyz Ar-Namys Party, and the Georgian A Just Georgia Party.

In July 2008, the media, citing Konstantin Kosachev and Boris Gryzlov, reported United Russia's entry into the Asia-Pacific branch of the Centrist Democrat International. Representatives of United Russia also attended a congress of the center-right European People's Party, with which Mikheil Saakashvili, Yulia Tymoshenko, Nicolas Sarkozy, Angela Merkel, Silvio Berlusconi, José Manuel Barroso, and Herman Van Rompuy are associated, in December 2009, without formally applying for a membership. The further fate of these relationships is unknown. However, a few years later, the party and its leader Vladimir Putin, according to several news agencies, began to increasix`ngly actively oppose their ideology to the Western one and, at the same time, position themselves as conservatives (in world politics, Ronald Reagan, Margaret Thatcher, and George W. Bush are considered well-known conservatives). In 2014, journalist Alexei Venediktov characterized party leader Vladimir Putin's views as right-wing: "If Putin lived in America, he would be a member of the right wing of the Republican Party. Vladimir Vladimirovich is becoming more conservative, he is moving towards the conservative, reactionary wing of the Republican Party, much more to the right than [John] McCain. McCain is a liberal by his side." Russian political scientists and Western politicians have repeatedly noted the indistinctness and inconsistency of United Russia's positioning.

In 2016, United Russia signed the Lovcen Declaration with the leader of the Montenegrin Democratic People's Party, Milan Knezevic, later joined by the leader of the Socialist People's Party of Montenegro, Srdjan Milic. United Russia has signed cooperation agreements with right-wing populist parties, such as Freedom Party of Austria, as well as the Republican Party of Armenia, the Japanese Liberal Democratic Party, and the Italian League for Salvini Premier. Its youth wing, the Young Guard of United Russia, has an alliance with the youth wing of Alternative for Germany, Young Alternative for Germany. The party has also signed cooperation agreements with the Serb nationalist Alliance of Independent Social Democrats of Bosnia and Herzegovina and the Estonian Centre Party (though party leader Jüri Ratas recently claimed that the agreement has not been active for ten years and that there is no current cooperation between the parties). The party has proposed a cooperation agreement to the Five Star Movement (M5S). The M5S never gave a proper answer to the proposal and it is currently unknown whether it actually accepted the proposal or not.

United Russia has signed cooperation agreements with a number of big tent and left-wing parties, including Kazakhstan's Nur Otan party, the Serbian Progressive Party, the Mongolian People's Party, the Cambodian People's Party, the Uzbekistan Liberal Democratic Party, the People's Democratic Party of Tajikistan, the Party of Socialists of the Republic of Moldova, the Lao People's Revolutionary Party, the Communist Party of Vietnam, South Africa's African National Congress, the New Azerbaijan Party, the Prosperous Armenia party, the Arab Socialist Ba'ath Party – Syria Region, the Workers' Party of Korea, the Communist Party of Cuba, the Philippines' PDP–Laban party, and the Latvian Harmony Centre Party. The party used to have an agreement with the Latvian Social Democratic Party "Harmony", but the agreement lapsed in 2016 and was not renewed.

Until 2014, United Russia was in the European Democrat Group in the Parliamentary Assembly of the Council of Europe alongside the British Conservative Party, Polish Law and Justice and Turkish Justice and Development Party. United Russia has also signed cooperation agreements.

| Country | Party |
|---|---|
| Armenia | Republican Party of Armenia |
| Azerbaijan | New Azerbaijan |
| Belarus | Belaya Rus |
| Estonia | Estonian Centre Party (until 2022) |
| Georgia | A Just Georgia |
| Kazakhstan | Amanat |
| Kyrgyzstan | Ar-Namys |
| Latvia | Harmony Centre |
| Moldova | Party of Socialists of the Republic of Moldova |
| Mongolia | Mongolian People's Party |
| Montenegro | Democratic People's Party, Socialist People's Party of Montenegro |
| North Korea | Workers' Party of Korea |
| Serbia | Serbian Progressive Party |
| South Ossetia | Unity Party |
| Tajikistan | People's Democratic Party of Tajikistan |
| Ukraine | Party of Regions (until 2014), Opposition Platform — For Life (until 2022) |
| Uzbekistan | Uzbekistan Liberal Democratic Party |
| Yemen | General People's Congress |

===== United States =====
On 20 September 2012, the United States State Department spokeswoman Victoria Nuland announced that United Russia had for several years taken part in programs funded through the United States Agency for International Development (USAID), which the United States is implementing through the National Democratic Institute (NDI) and International Republican Institute (IRI). Member of the Presidium of the General Council of United Russia and the Federation Council of Russia Andrey Klimov, who oversees the interaction of United Russia with international organizations, said that United Russia has never taken part in any programs of USAID or its partner organizations. Politician Boris Nemtsov responded that he had documented evidence of United Russia's cooperation with USAID. Political scientist Sergei Markov, who worked for NDI in the 1990s, elaborated on United Russia's ties to USAID. According to Konstantin Kosachev, United Russia maintains international ties with the Republican Party and the Democratic Party. In these parties, the maintenance of international contacts is entrusted to the IRI and NDI.

===== Inter-party cooperation in 2018–2021 =====
The inter-party dialogue in the BRICS format has been actively developed in the 2010s. The party attaches particular importance to such an authoritative association as the International Conference of Asian Political Parties (ICAPP). Today, this largest inter-party structure in the world has united over three hundred political parties of the Eurasian continent and has established strong ties with similar organizations in Africa and Latin America. United Russia not only actively participates in the work of the ICAPP but is also a member of its governing body - the Standing Committee.

The largest forum of the ICAPP, its 10th General Assembly, was held in October 2018 in Moscow with the participation of 400 representatives of 74 parties from 42 countries. The final Moscow declaration of the assembly contains an appeal to the world's parties to jointly fight against terrorism, extremism, and outside interference in the internal affairs of states and for equality, social justice, and mutually beneficial cooperation between countries and peoples. In July 2020, under the leadership of party chairman Dmitry Medvedev, a round table of representatives of the leading parties in Europe, Asia, and Africa was held on the issues of consolidating efforts in the fight against COVID-19 and its socio-economic consequences.

In the summer and autumn of 2020, Internet conferences were held between United Russia and the political parties of the countries of the Commonwealth of Independent States, with public associations of Russian compatriots living on all continents, a meeting of international secretaries of African countries and the international commission of United Russia was held. At the party's initiative, on 24–25 March 2021, the first-ever international inter-party conference "Russia-Africa: Reviving Traditions" was held. Delegates from 50 leading African parliamentary parties, heads of state, and ministers participated in its work, and more than 12,500 people from 56 countries watched the discussions.

As part of the preparations for the Russia-Africa: Reviving Traditions conference, as well as following its results, several agreements on interaction and cooperation were signed with the leading political parties of the African continent. United Russia is actively working to support compatriots living abroad. Thus, in the summer of 2021, several events took place in multilateral and bilateral formats, in which Russians living in all corners of the globe took part. To strengthen this vector, as well as inter-party work in the international direction in general, on the initiative of President Vladimir Putin, a commission of the General Council of the party for international cooperation and support for compatriots abroad was created. The commission's main task was to implement the provisions of the Foreign and Defense Policy section of the People's Program adopted at the 20th Party Congress in August 2021. Foreign Minister Sergey Lavrov became the chairman of this commission.

=== Interaction with other Russian political parties ===
==== Agrarian Party of Russia ====
On 28 April 2004, at the 12th Congress of the Agrarian Party of Russia, with the recommendations of the Chairman of the State Duma of Russia, Boris Gryzlov, a new chairman of the Agrarian Party, Vladimir Plotnikov, was elected. Since the election, the party began open cooperation with United Russia. In 2008, the Agrarian Party of Russia announced its dissolution and joined United Russia. In 2012, the Agrarian Party of Russia was re-established under the chairmanship of Olga Bashmachnikova, executive director of the Association of Peasants' (Farmers') Households and Agricultural Cooperatives of Russia (AKKOR), an association headed by Vladimir Plotnikov, a member of the Presidium of the General Council of United Russia.

==== A Just Russia ====
On 8 February 2010, A Just Russia, whose chairman in 2006–2011 and again since 2013 was the Chairman of the Federation Council of Russia (2001–2011) Sergey Mironov, concluded a political agreement with the United Russia party, in which both parties declared that they were committed to striving for coalition actions: A Just Russia supports the strategic course of acting President Medvedev and Prime Minister Putin on strategic issues, and United Russia supports Mironov as Speaker of the Federation Council of the Federal Assembly of the Russian Federation. The parties to the agreement expressed their readiness to work together in resolving personnel issues, including those based on the election results, by concluding package agreements when forming governing bodies. However, this agreement was annulled a month after the signing since, according to Mironov, United Russia did not fulfil the terms. In March 2011, Mironov announced his refusal to support the candidate from the United Russia party in the upcoming 2012 presidential elections.

On 18 May 2011, at the suggestion of the United Russia faction in the Legislative Assembly of St. Petersburg, Sergei Mironov was recalled from the post of representative of the Legislative Assembly of the city in the Federation Council, thus losing the post of Chairman of the Federation Council, as well as the mandate of a senator. A Just Russia endorsed the United Russia presidential candidate in the 2018 Russian presidential election and in the 2024 Russian presidential election.

==== Antifascist Pact ====
On 20 February 2006, in Moscow, at the initiative of United Russia, 12 Russian political parties signed the so-called "antifascist pact". An agreement on combating nationalism, xenophobia, and religious hatred was signed by United Russia, the Liberal Democratic Party of Russia, Agrarian Party of Russia, the Union of Right Forces, Socialist United Party of Russia, the Russian Party of Pensioners for Social Justice, Patriots of Russia, the Russian United Industrial Party, the Russian Peace Party, Civilian Power, the Party of Social Justice, and the Democratic Party of Russia. Acting United Russia General Council Secretary Vyacheslav Volodin called on all parties to unite around the pact, stressing that those who do not "should withdraw from political life and become pariahs." The Communist Party of the Russian Federation, Rodina, and Yabloko remained outside the pact, skeptically assessing the document, and the last two refused to participate in the pact due to the participation of the Liberal Democratic Party in it. The Communist Party refused to participate in the pact since, in their opinion, United Russia staged a PR on this topic to increase their party's popularity.

== Structure ==
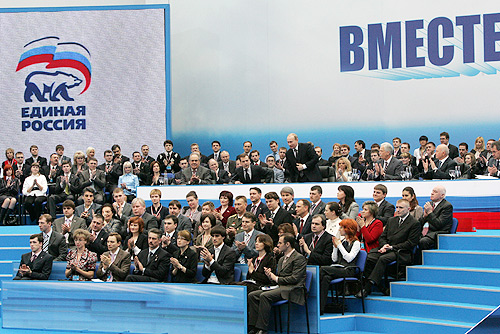
Putin (standing) at the 9th United Russia Party Congress on 15 April 2008

In April 2008, United Russia amended Section 7 of its charter, changing its heading from Party Chairman to Chairman of the Party and Chairman of the Party's Supreme Council. Under the amendments, United Russia may introduce a supreme elective post in the party, the post of the party's chairman, at the suggestion of Supreme Council and its chairman. The Supreme Council, led by the Supreme Council chairman, defines the strategy for the development of the party. The General Council has 152 members, is the foremost party platform in between party congresses and issues statements on important social or political questions. The Presidium of the General Council is led by a secretary, consists of 23 members and leads the political activity of the party, for instance election campaigns or other programmatic publications.

United Russia introduced a local chapter system that mimicked the Japanese Liberal Democratic Party's (LDP) organization as a strong foundation for the one-party dominant system in the early 2000s. United Russia eagerly interviewed the LDP mission and studied their party structure. The number of party members was steadily increased by the introduction of the system. As of 20 September 2005, the party has a total of 2,600 local and 29,856 primary offices. United Russia runs local and regional offices in all parts of the Russian Federation and also operates a foreign liaison office in Israel through a deal with the Kadima party.

== Program and charter ==
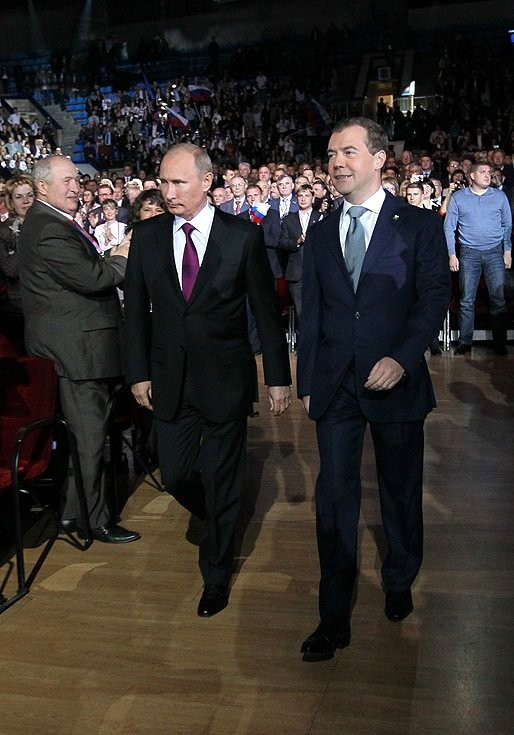
Putin and Medvedev at the party congress on 24 September 2011

The officially registered charter of the United Russia party was available on the website of the Ministry of Justice of the Russian Federation. In 2010, the Ministry of Justice website also contained the United Russia program dated 1 December 2001. There is currently no mention of the United Russia program on the website of the Ministry of Justice. The current charter dates from 26 May 2012 and has undergone several changes compared to the 2001 charter.

On the official website of United Russia, as a program of the party until September 2011, the "Election Program of the All-Russian Political Party "United Russia" "Putin's Plan is a Worthy Future of a Great Country" was submitted, adopted by the 8th Party Congress on 1 October 2007. The previous election program, approved on 20 September 2003 at the 3rd Congress of the All-Russian Political Party "Unity and Fatherland" - "United Russia", is not available on the official website, but copies are available on other sites. In particular, this program contained the following items:

Tightening measures against corruption and other offenses by employees of state bodies (especially law enforcement); … Finally, by 2008 we plan to achieve the introduction of visa-free exchange between Russia and the countries of the European Union, expanding cooperation within the Schengen regime. … The state policy of support and development of high-tech, innovative industries - the new economy of Russia. … Changing the structure of exports in favor of engineering products. … affordable housing

Also on the official website is the policy statement of United Russia, adopted by the 7th Congress on 15 April 2008. In addition, on the official website of the United Russia party, there is a "programme document" called "Russia: let's save and increase!", adopted on 21 November 2009 at the 11th Party Congress in St. Petersburg. The "programme document", in particular, states:

Our ideology distinguishes United Russia from opponents and adversaries. The party is guided by the principle "Preserve and increase". This is the basis of Russian conservatism. ... "United Russia" has proved that it is capable of ensuring the governance of the country, social and political stability. Today, at a new stage of development, the Party assumes historical and political responsibility for the modernization of the country, for the implementation of the national course - Strategy-2020.

"Strategy 2020" is in fact another program of the party; however, unlike other programs and program documents, it is not framed as a separate completed document. Putin spoke about the "Strategy 2020" for the first time at the expanded meeting of the State Council of the Russian Federation "On the Development Strategy of Russia until 2020" on 8 February 2008 in Krasnoyarsk. The Strategy 2020 page has been removed from the United Russia official website but is still available on the Internet Archive. "The official website of the expert groups updating the Strategy 2020" is located on the RIA Novosti web portal. In May 2011, at the suggestion of Putin, then Prime Minister of Russia and chairman of the United Russia party, a coalition of public organizations with the participation of United Russia was created - the All-Russia People's Front. The Front's and United Russia's election programs, the "People's Program", were approved at the 12th Party Congress of United Russia on 23 and 24 September 2011. At Putin's suggestion as party chairman, the Institute for Socio-Economic and Political Research was created to prepare the Front's program, headed by Senator Nikolay Fyodorov, but the final scenario has changed.

=== Programs and policy message 2011 ===
On 24 September 2011, acting President of Russia Dmitry Medvedev and Prime Minister of Russia Vladimir Putin spoke at the 12th Congress of United Russia. Medvedev identified seven strategic priorities for government policy: modernizing the economy; fulfilment of social obligations; rooting out corruption; strengthening the judiciary; maintaining interethnic and interfaith peace and combating illegal migration and ethnic crime; the formation of a modern political system; internal and external security, independent and reasonable foreign policy of Russia. Putin, in turn, set a goal for Russia to become one of the world's five largest economies and proposed writing off the erroneous tax debt of 36 million Russians in the amount of 30 billion rubles and raising salaries for public sector workers by 6.5% from 10 October. Vladimir Putin also noted that taxes for wealthy citizens should be higher than for the middle class and suggested raising housing and communal services tariffs only above the established norm. Putin also set as priorities the complete rearmament of the army and navy in 5–10 years, the doubling of the pace of road construction in 10 years, and the creation or renewal of 25 million jobs in 20 years.

After Medvedev and Putin's speeches were met with stormy, prolonged applause, State Duma Vice Speaker Oleg Morozov suggested that these speeches be considered the party's program for the elections. The congress unanimously approved the party's pre-election program proposed in this form for the upcoming Duma elections. According to the authors of Gazeta.Ru, this is how the so-called "People's Programme", an extensive document that the institute of Senator Nikolai Fyodorov prepared all summer long, publicly collecting "instructions" of voters and recommendations of experts throughout the country, lost its pre-election status. The document was supposed to be presented at the congress but was absent without explanation. Later, the Secretary of the United Russia General Council, Sergey Neverov, noted that the People's Program, or the "Program of People's Initiatives", published on 23 October 2011, is considered by United Russia as a plan for the development of the country and should be considered as a whole with the program appeal of the party. Neverov said that United Russia's program address contains the strategic goals of the country's development set by Putin and Medvedev, and the "People's Initiatives Program" contains tactical steps to achieve these goals.

On 14 October 2011, United Russia published a "programme appeal" composed of replicas of speeches by acting President Dmitry Medvedev and Prime Minister Vladimir Putin at the party congress. According to Gazeta.ru experts, the document resembles a text from the Brezhnev era and is consistent with forebodings of the coming stagnation. Later, the "programme appeal" was published with the addition "Approved by the 12th Congress of the All-Russian Political Party United Russia" on 24 September 2011" and the subtitle "Election Program of the All-Russian Political Party "United Russia" for the Election of Deputies of the State Duma of the Federal Assembly of the Russian Federation of the Sixth Convocation (Programme Appeal of the United Russia Party to the Citizens of Russia)". The programme appeal, in addition to general words, contains the following specific points:

1. "To be strong and in the next five years to enter the top five largest economies in the world"
2. "The national goal for the next 20 years is to radically upgrade or create at least 25 million modern jobs in industry and in the public sector"
3. "In the next 5 years, we will ensure the almost complete independence of the country in all basic types of food"
4. "By the end of 2014, the average wage in the country should increase by 1.5 times"
5. "In two years, the wage fund in healthcare will grow by 30 percent. Already next year, the salaries of school teachers and teachers of all Russian universities will equal or exceed the average salary in the economy in all regions of Russia without exception."
6. "In 5 years we must build at least 1,000 new schools in Russia, and in the same 5 years we must not have a single school in disrepair"
7. "Affordable housing for every Russian family. By 2016, it is necessary to almost double the volume of housing construction"
8. "Already in the near future, following the decline in inflation, we intend to ensure a further reduction in annual rates on mortgage loans"
9. "As planned, we will provide housing for all participants in the Great Patriotic War."

In the same address, United Russia nominated Putin for the post of President of Russia and Medvedev for Prime Minister. On 27 November 2011, after the closing of the second part of the 12th Congress of United Russia, at which Vladimir Putin was officially nominated as a candidate for the presidency of Russia, a document appeared on the official website of United Russia entitled "Election program of the United Russia party in the elections President of Russia".

=== Party report on the implementation of the 2016 program ===
Party chairman Dmitry Medvedev presented a report on the party's work over the last five years at a joint meeting of the Supreme and General Councils of United Russia, which was held on 9 June 2021 in Moscow. According to him, the vast majority of the provisions of the 2016 program have either been implemented or are under implementation. Among the achievements of the party, he noted amendments to the labor code, including those regulating the position of remote workers, supporting small businesses, regulating the status of the self-employed, the adoption of a law on free hot meals for schoolchildren, on the priority right of brothers and sisters to go to the same school or kindergarten, and extending the maternity capital program until 2026. At the same time, the process of reporting to voters the work of the past five years began at the federal and regional levels. Deputies from the party at all levels had to report to their voters about the changes that had taken place with the participation of United Russia.

==== Implementation of the 2016 program ====
| Expand the list of public services provided in multifunctional centres to include the most problematic and massive public services (for example, exchanging or obtaining a driver's license) | At the end of November 2020, Prime Minister M. Mishustin signed a resolution that gives the regions the right to independently increase the number of services provided at the MFC. |
| Ensure constant monitoring of the implementation of the norm of the law on the prohibition to demand from citizens documents (certificates, extracts, copies, etc.) already available to the authorities | In 2016, the government forbade the authorities, when providing public services, to demand from citizens 85 types of documents and information that are at the disposal of 25 federal executive authorities. |
| To oblige government agencies to place on the Internet an exhaustive list of mandatory requirements that are the subject of control, with a mandatory ban on conducting inspections of requirements that are not properly published. | In July 2020, a law was adopted in which the supervisory authority only has the right to conduct inspections of legal entities if a list of mandatory inspection requirements is posted on its website. This has simplified the preparation for audits of many organizations. |
| Establish for self-employed citizens engaged in income-generating activities without the involvement of employees and not registered as individual entrepreneurs (for example, tutoring, childcare, care for the elderly, the sick, etc.), the possibility of voluntary notification of the implementation of such activities with a tax exemption for three years; | From 2019, self-employed citizens can switch to a special tax regime "Tax on professional income". The regime will operate until 2029 or until the annual income is at most 2.4 million rubles. As of the end of 2021, this tax regime is in effect in almost all regions of the Russian Federation. Individuals and self-employed entrepreneurs who switch to the new special tax regime (self-employed) can only pay tax at a reduced rate of 4 or 6% on income from self-employment. This allows one to conduct business legally and receive income from part-time jobs without the risk of getting fined for illegal business activities. |
| To restore from 2017 the indexation of social payments, benefits, and compensations under the norms of the current legislation for inflation | Since 2018, a unified procedure for indexing social benefits has been established based on the inflation rate for the previous year. |
| Implement actions to prevent wage arrears | From 2016 to 2021, the number of employees of enterprises that have wage arrears decreased by three times, from 71 to 24 thousand people. The debt for the same period decreased by two times, from 3 billion 850 million rubles to 1 billion 800 million rubles. |
| After 1 January 2018, continue state support in the form of maternity (family) capital and monthly cash payments to families at the birth of a third child and subsequent children, taking into account targeting and need criteria | The maternity capital program has not only been extended until 31 December 2026 but also expanded. Now maternity capital is issued at the birth of the first child. The amount of payment for families with two children has been increased. The total amount of maternity capital has been increased by 200,000 to 639,431 rubles. The circle of persons entitled to receive maternity capital has been expanded to include women who have given birth (adopted) their first child since 1 January 2020 and men who are the sole adopters of the first child. The procedure and terms for obtaining maternity capital have been simplified. |
| Develop a health care system for older citizens that combines medical services for people of all ages, from prevention to palliative care; organize the quality work of the geriatric service and ensure its availability | In 2020, a law was passed on a day off for working Russians aged 40 and older to undergo a medical examination. In 2024, about 2 thousand new specialists in the geriatric service should appear in Russia. New geriatric centres are opening in the regions. In addition, in March 2019, a law on palliative care was signed. The document expanded the concept of "palliative care" and clarified the procedure for its provision. |
| Support initiatives to attract the best university graduates to work in schools | At the federal level, there is the "Zemsky Teacher" program to support young teachers. A young specialist who came to work in the countryside receives 1 million rubles as a support measure. Also, at the initiative of United Russia, senior students of pedagogical universities can now work in schools, combining work and study. |
| Continue the implementation of projects of the United Russia party for the construction of sports and recreation centres, the reconstruction and construction of school sports halls for the improvement of children, and the formation of a healthy lifestyle culture | In 2020, 3 billion rubles were allocated for the construction of sports and recreation centres. Within the Children's Sports project framework, United Russia controls the timely commissioning of sports facilities. At the initiative of United Russia, the government will send 2 billion rubles to the regions for the construction of FOKOTs in 2021. They are being actively built, and about 100 objects are planned. Money is also allocated for the repair of rural sports halls. |
| Strengthen measures of state support for talented children and youth, including developing a system of creative competitions and expanding the network of children's centres | Since 2015, the Sirius educational centre has been operating in Russia, aimed at supporting gifted children. According to its model, 60 other centres have been created, and by 2022 it is planned to create them in all regions of the Russian Federation. In 2020, 29 thousand schoolchildren participated in regional platform programs. At the same time, Sirius supports regional centres (holds webinars, seminars, conferences, and teachers from the regions come to Sirius for internships). |
| Expand support for Russian producers of environmentally friendly domestic products | In 2018, a law on organic agricultural products was signed, providing special labelling and state support for its producers. According to the law, organic agricultural products, raw materials and food, the production of which meets certain requirements, will be considered organic. |

In August 2021, Secretary of the General Council of the party Andrey Turchak announced the annual report of the deputies of United Russia to his voters. This will become a mandatory norm for United Russia.

=== Moral code ===
At the 18th Party Congress (December 2018), rules of conduct were adopted, binding on all party members. It highly recommends to:

- be humble
- be discreet in public
- protect honor and dignity by legal means
- leave the party in case of committing "illegal or immoral acts"
- treat people and their problems with attention and respect, protect the rights of citizens
- help Russians in overcoming difficult life situations
- be intolerant of attempts to distort the history of Russia, trample on traditions, and show disrespect for culture
- be responsible for your words

=== People's Program 2021 ===
The people's program of the party was prepared during the 2021 election campaign. It was based on the April message of President Putin and the results of a survey of more than two million Russians. Its totality is positioned as a plan for the country's development over the next five years. The collection of proposals started in June 2021, and the website np.er.ru was explicitly created to receive feedback from voters. President Putin took part in preparing the proposals and proposed some measures of social support for citizens and projects for the country's development at the second stage of the United Russia congress on 24 August 2021.

All program points have passed preliminary discussions with experts, deputies, and officials of relevant departments. Among other things, some proposals were discussed in the created headquarters of public support with the participation of representatives of the federal five of the party list: Anna Kuznetsova, Sergey Lavrov, Sergei Shoigu, Yelena Shmelyova, and Denis Protsenko. The people's program of "United Russia" consists of two main sections: "People's Wellbeing" and "Strong Russia". Each includes topics covering all spheres of life of every inhabitant of the country. The "People's Wellbeing" section includes several blocks: "Good work – prosperity in the house", "Strong family", "Human health", "Care for all who need it", "Modern education and advanced science", "Convenient and comfortable life", "Ecology for life", "State for the human". The second section, "Strong Russia", includes such topics as "Economics of Development", "Rural Development", "Development of the Regions and Transport Infrastructure of the Country", "Culture, History, Traditions", "Civil Solidarity and Youth Policy", and "Foreign and defense policy". The program commission of the party, which includes party and external experts and representatives of relevant ministries and the public, will control the implementation of the People's Program.

== Governing bodies ==
United Russia consists of regional branches, one per subject of the federation, regional branches from local branches, one per urban district or municipal district, local branches from primary branches, one per urban settlement or rural settlement. The supreme body is the congress; between congresses, it is the General Council (until 2004, the Central Political Council). The executive bodies are the Presidium of the General Council and the Central Executive Committee. The highest official is the chairman. The supreme audit body is the Central Control and Audit Commission.

The supreme body of a regional branch is the conference of the regional branch; between conferences of the regional branch, it is the regional political council. The executive bodies of the regional branch are the presidium of the regional political council and the regional executive committee. The auditing bodies of the regional branch is the regional control and audit commission. The highest official of the regional branch is the secretary regional branch.

The supreme body of the local branch is the conference of the local branch. Between the conference of the local branch, it is the local political council. The highest official of the local branch is the secretary of the local branch. The executive body of the local branch is the local executive committee. The auditing body of the local branch is the local control and audit commission. The supreme body of the primary branch is the general meeting; between general meetings, it is the council of the primary branch. The highest official of the primary branch is the secretary of the primary branch.

=== Party congress ===
The highest body of the party is the party congress. The congress resolves the most important issues, including the creation or liquidation of structural divisions, central and governing bodies, determines the main directions of the activity of the political association, and approves the charter and program documents. The congress makes decisions on the participation of the party in elections at various levels, including nominating and recalling candidates for the post of President of Russia and deputies of the State Duma, electing the chairman of the party, the head and members of the Supreme Council, the composition of the General Council and the Central Control Commission, and also makes decisions on early termination of their powers.

As a rule, the Congress is convened by the General Council of the Party or its Presidium once a year. An extraordinary congress may be convened by the decision of the governing bodies of United Russia or at the suggestion of more than one-third of its regional branches. In the entire history of the party, 20 congresses have passed. In 2020, the congress was not held due to the unfavourable epidemiological situation.

=== Party Chairman ===
According to the charter of United Russia, the party congress has the right, at the suggestion of the chairman of the Supreme Council, to establish the highest elective position: the chairman of the party. The position was introduced at the 5th Party Congress on 27 November 2004. The chairman is elected by open vote at the party congress; a candidate must gain two-thirds of the delegates' votes for election. The party chairman represents it in relations with Russian, international, and foreign state and non-state bodies and organizations, public associations, individuals and legal entities, and the media. The Chairman opens the United Russia congress, chairs its governing bodies' meetings, and also proposes candidates for election or appointment to some positions. Boris Gryzlov was the first chairman of the party. On 7 May 2008, at the 9th Party Congress, non-partisan Vladimir Putin was elected chairman, for which the charter was previously changed. On 26 May 2012, at the 13th Party Congress, Dmitry Medvedev was elected chairman of United Russia, having joined the party before the congress.

| No. | Leader | Portrait | Took office | Left office |
|---|---|---|---|---|
| — | Collective leadership: Sergey Shoygu / Yury Luzhkov / Mintimer Shaimiev | | 1 December 2001 | 27 November 2004 |
| 1 | Boris Gryzlov | | 27 November 2004 | 7 May 2008 |
| 2 | Vladimir Putin | | 7 May 2008 | 26 May 2012 |
| 3 | Dmitry Medvedev | | 26 May 2012 | Incumbent |

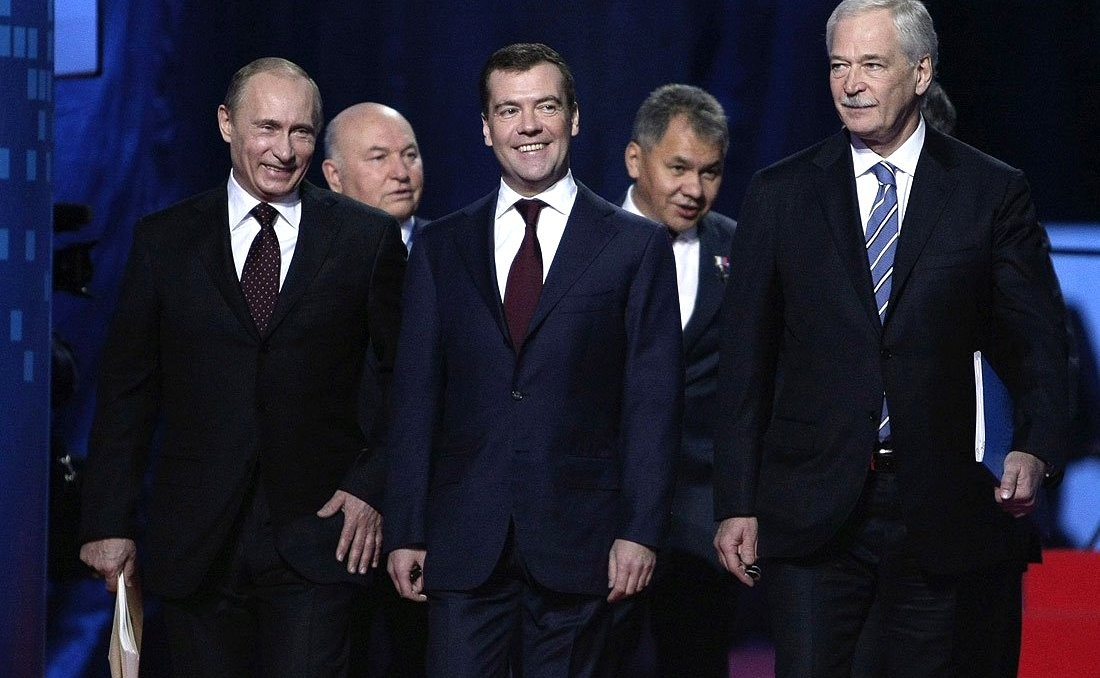
Before the 11th Party Congress United Russia, 2009. President Dmitry Medvedev, prime minister and United Russia chairman Vladimir Putin, Russian State Duma chairman and chairman of the party's supreme council Boris Gryzlov (right). Background - (left to right): the co-chairs of the party's supreme council - then-mayor of Moscow, Yuri Luzhkov, and the head of the Ministry of Emergency Situations, Sergei Shoigu.

The position of party chairman should not be confused with that of the chairman of the party's Supreme Council, who, according to the charter, "is the highest elected official of the party." Since the introduction of this position in April 2008, Boris Gryzlov has been the Chairman of the Supreme Council of United Russia. Initially, the party's governing bodies were the General Council (15 people), the Central Executive Committee, the Supreme Council, and the Central Political Council (liquidated in November 2004).

=== Supreme Council ===
Consisting of 100 members, the Supreme Council determines the development strategy of the party and provides support for the implementation of the program and charter. In addition, it contributes to strengthening the authority and growth of the influence of the party in Russian society. The Supreme Council is elected from among prominent public and political figures of the Russian Federation who have great authority in Russian society and in the international arena, including those who are not members of United Russia. The elections of the Supreme Council, as well as its chairman, are held by open voting at the party congress.

At the party congress on 4 December 2021, 98 members of the Supreme Council were elected and two seats remained vacant. Almost half of the staff has been updated: it includes such people as the presidential envoy to the Far Eastern Federal District Yuri Trutnev, State Duma Vice Speaker Sergei Neverov, chief doctor of the hospital in Kommunarka Denis Protsenko, People's Artist of Russia Vladimir Mashkov, Deputy Chairman of the Committee of the State Duma of the Russian Federation on Youth Policy Mikhail Kiselyov, First Deputy Minister of Labor and Social Protection and Chairman of the Public Council of the Strong Family party project Olga Batalina, President of the all-Russian public organization of small and medium-sized businesses "Support of Russia" Alexander Kalinin, and General Director of the ANO "Agency for Strategic Initiatives to Promote New Projects" Svetlana Chupsheva. The Supreme Council also includes a number of regional governors. The Chairman of the Supreme Council is Boris Gryzlov.

=== General Council ===
The General Council directs the activities of United Russia between its congresses. It ensures the implementation of all party decisions, develops draft election programs and other documents, recommendations on the main directions of the political strategy, and directs the political activities of the party. To date, it includes 170 people (the number of members is determined by the congress), who are elected at the congress by secret ballot. At the same time, the composition of the council is subject to annual rotation of at least 15%, according to the charter.

=== Presidium of the General Council ===
The leadership of the General Council is entrusted to its secretary and presidium. The Presidium directs the party's political activities: from the development of draft election programs to organizational, party, and ideological documents. Its competence includes making decisions on convening an extraordinary congress and creating and liquidating regional branches. The presidium has the right to approve the budget of the party and also, on the proposal of the bureau of the Supreme Council, to submit to the congress a proposal to nominate a candidate for the post of President of Russia and nominate lists of candidates for deputies of the State Duma. The secretary of the presidium of the General Council directs the activities of the presidium and is authorized to make political statements on behalf of the party, put the first signature on the financial documents of the party, sign documents related to the competence of the General Council and its presidium. Sergey Neverov was the Acting Secretary of the Presidium of the General Council of the Party from 21 October 2010. On 15 September 2011, Neverov, at the suggestion of Putin, was approved as secretary.

On 12 October 2017, Andrey Turchak became secretary. To date, the Presidium of the General Council includes 35 people. Their number and personal composition were approved on 4 December 2021 at the United Russia party congress. Andrey Turchak was re-elected Secretary of the General Council.

=== Party Central Executive Committee ===
The Party Central Executive Committee is the main executive body, supervising the work of regional branches. It also organizes the work of several party institutions and is responsible for interaction with the United Russia faction in the State Duma. The term of office of the CEC expires after the completion of the regular elections to the State Duma, after which a new structure is approved at the party congress. Alexander Sidyakin became the head of the Central Executive Committee at the congress on 4 December 2021. From 2009 to 2011, Sidyakin was the secretary of the movement of the Federation of Independent Trade Unions of Russia, the head of the department for collective action and the development of the trade union movement of the FNPR. In 2011, Sidyakin became a State Duma deputy from United Russia, where he worked as deputy chairman of the State Duma committee on housing policy and housing and communal services. After the 2016 elections, he became the first deputy head of the same committee and, in 2017, a member of the Presidium of the United Russia General Council. Many political scientists associated Alexander Sidyakin's appointment with his extensive experience in technological and legislative work and with the need to transform the central executive committee of United Russia into a permanent electoral headquarters.

==== CEC members ====
- Orlova, Natalya Alekseyevna — First Deputy Head of the CEC, Head of the Financial and Economic Support Department
- Zhavoronkov, Maxim Konstantinovich — First Deputy Head of the CEC (on a voluntary basis), head of the apparatus of the United Russia faction in the State Duma
- Kostikova, Anastasia Alexandrovna — Deputy Head of the CEC, Head of the Information and Social Communications Department
- Nekrasov, Dmitry Vladimirovich — Deputy Head of the CEC for project work
- Osinnikov, Andrei Vladislavovich — Deputy Head of the CEC, Head of the Department of Regional and Technological Work
- Romanov, Roman Nikolayevich — Deputy Head of the CEC, Head of the Political Work Department, Director of the Higher Party School
- Tikhonov, Denis Vladimirovich — Deputy Head of the CEC, Head of the Department for Supporting the Activities of Commissions of the General Council of the Party
- Muravskaya, Maria Valeriyevna — head of the organizational department of the CEC
- Ryabtsev Alexander Alexandrovich — Head of the Department for Work with Citizens' Appeals to the CEC
- Shkred, Konstantin Viktorovich — Head of Project Activities Department (on a voluntary basis)

=== Central Control Commission ===
The Central Control Commission (CCC) is the control and auditing central body of the party, which monitors compliance with the Charter (except for ethical standards of the party), the execution of decisions of the central bodies of the party, as well as the financial and economic activities of structural divisions. It is elected by the congress from among the members of the party by secret ballot for a period of five years by a majority of votes from the number of registered delegates of the Congress if there is a quorum. The Party Congress determines the numerical composition of the Central Control Commission. The Chairman of the Central Control Commission is the Deputy Chairman of the State Duma, Irina Yarovaya.

=== Interregional coordinating councils of the party ===
Established in 2011 by the decision of the Presidium of the General Council of the party, the interregional coordinating councils' task includes coordination of activities, control and methodological support of the party's regional branches, and assistance in the implementation of electoral tasks. In total, seven ICCs have been created per the number of federal districts:

- Central Interregional Coordinating Council (Moscow).
- North-Western Interregional Coordinating Council (St. Petersburg).
- Volga Interregional Coordinating Council (Nizhny Novgorod).
- Ural Interregional Coordinating Council (Yekaterinburg).
- Siberian Interregional Coordinating Council (Novosibirsk).
- Far Eastern Interregional Coordinating Council (Khabarovsk).

=== Regional branches ===
Regional branches were created in all subjects of the Russian Federation, including Crimea. Like the federal structure, the supreme political body of the region is the regional conference of the party, which approves the quantitative and personal composition of the regional political council and the presidium of the regional political council. The party's main executive body in the region is the regional executive committee. The chief political head of the regional branch of the party is the secretary of the regional political council. The head of the executive committee is responsible for the entire organizational component of the work of the regional branch. Local party branches are created in the region's municipalities and are accountable for their work to the regional party branch. They also consist of local political councils headed by the secretary of the local branch and local executive committees headed by the head of the local executive committee.

Since 2019, United Russia has begun to apply the practice of appointing regional governors as secretaries of regional political councils. In 2019, thirteen governors were appointed: Marat Kumpilov in the Republic of Adygea, Gleb Nikitin in the Nizhny Novgorod Oblast, Aisen Nikolayev in the Republic of Sakha (Yakutia), Andrey Travnikov in the Novosibirsk Oblast, Radiy Khabirov in the Republic of Bashkortostan, Kazbek Kokov in the Kabardino-Balkarian Republic, Oleg Kozhemyako in the Primorsky Krai, Vladimir Vladimirov in the Stavropol Krai, Igor Vasiliev in the Kirov Oblast, Dmitry Azarov in the Samara Oblast, Alexander Bogomaz in the Bryansk Oblast, Andrey Chibis in the Murmansk Oblast, and Mikhail Razvozhayev, Acting Head of Sevastopol.

== Party institutions ==
=== Young Guard of United Russia ===
The Young Guard of United Russia (MGER) is a youth public association with a fixed membership, founded on 16 November 2005. The Young Guard supports the party's course and acts as its personnel reserve.

=== Interregional conferences ===
In March 2010, United Russia launched interregional conferences dedicated to the socio-economic development of federal districts. The conferences aim to define a clear and concrete development plan for each region for 2010–2012.

The reality is that only United Russia is probably capable of this work today. First, due to the branching of its structures and the dominant position in local and regional authorities. She has the necessary organizational, intellectual, and political resources to solve such large-scale tasks and is ready to take responsibility to the country for implementing the plans.

— Vladimir Putin

This involved the selection of extremely specific proposals and projects that could be implemented in the short term. At the conference's plenary sessions, the drafts were presented to Putin, who was then party leader. The first interregional conference was held in the Siberian Federal District in Krasnoyarsk (29–30 March 2010) and Novosibirsk (9 April 2010). It was called "Development of Siberia 2010–2012". The second conference was held in the North Caucasian Federal District, in Nalchik and Kislovodsk, from 5 to 6 July 2010 and was called "Development of the North Caucasus 2010–2012". The third conference, "Development of the Volga Region 2010–2012", was held in Ulyanovsk (9 September 2010) and Nizhny Novgorod (14 September 2010).

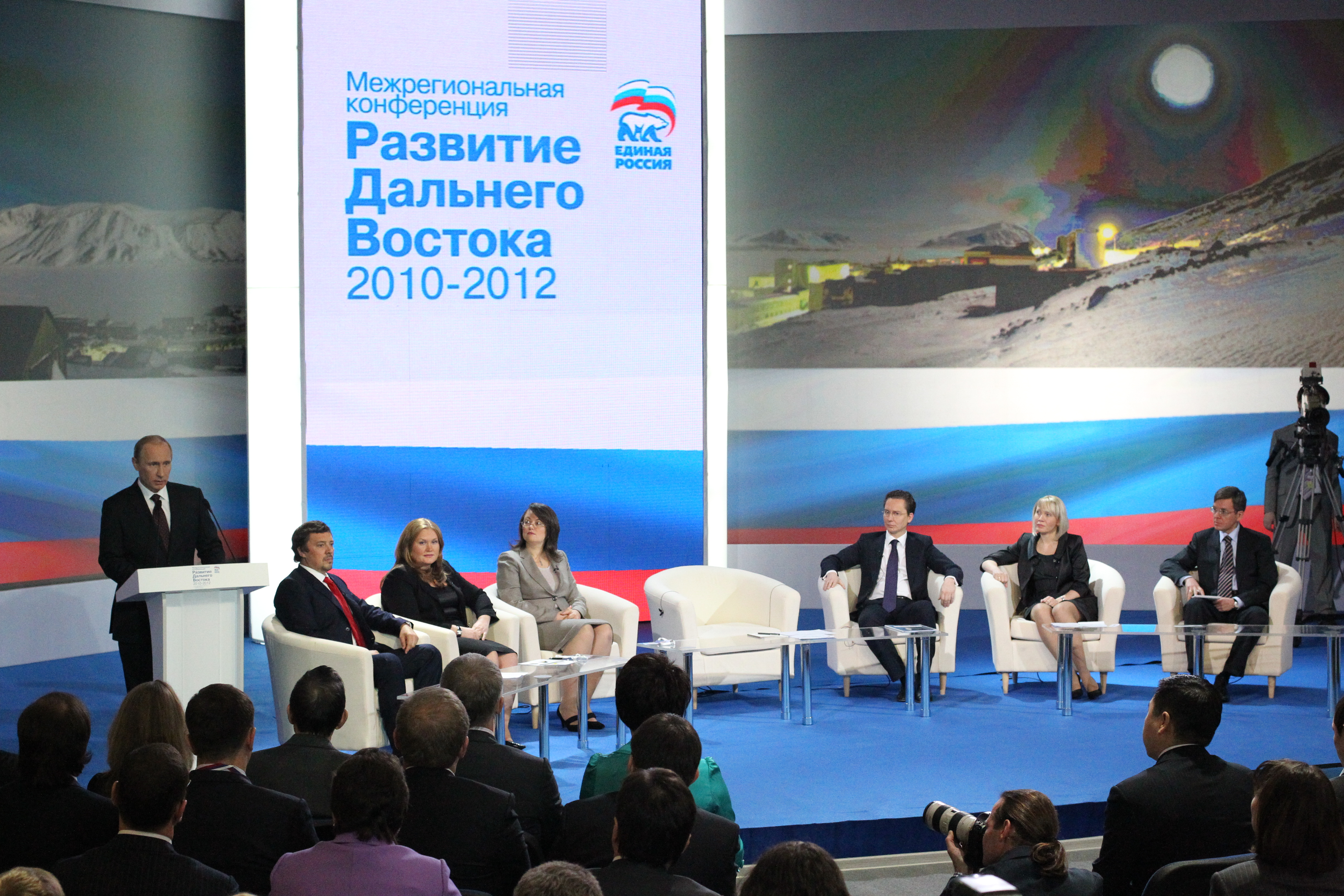
Interregional conference of United Russia in the Far East

The Interregional Party Conference of the Far Eastern Federal District "Strategy for the socio-economic development of the Far East until 2020" was held from 4 to 6 December 2010 in Khabarovsk. On it, Putin pointed out that one of the main problems for the Far East is the transport issue. He proposed significantly reducing flight prices within Russia and building new roads (in particular, by modernizing the Amur highway). He outlined the energy security of the Far East region as another significant problem. Putin promised to subsidize the supply of gas along the route Sakhalin-Khabarovsk-Vladivostok, which will significantly reduce the price for the end consumer.

At a party conference in the Central Federal District in Bryansk (3–4 March 2011), Putin invited party members to declare income and expenses. At the same time, specialists were asked to "think about the tools" of such control. Putin also demanded that the regional authorities restrain food prices, solve the problem of deceived equity holders by the end of 2012, and reduce the tax burden on small businesses. On 6 May 2011, the United Russia Interregional Conference was held in the Southern Federal District. It was held on the eve of the celebration of the next anniversary of the victory in the Great Patriotic War in Volgograd. Putin again took part in the conference as party leader. To promote new business and social projects and support young professionals, Putin proposed the creation of the Agency for Strategic Initiatives; he also proposed the creation and formation of the All-Russia People's Front.

On 30 June 2011, the interregional conference in the Ural Federal District was held in Yekaterinburg. On 5 September 2011, the last Interregional Conference was held in the Northwestern Federal District. At the conference in Cherepovets, Vladimir Putin touched upon many socio-economic and political issues. The acting prime minister also announced the need to form a petrochemical cluster in the Northwestern Federal District and support several projects in other regions of the district. During the five-hour conference, among other things, Putin proposed to allocate a lifting allowance of 1 million rubles to each young doctor working in the countryside and to organize a mortgage program for young teachers.

== Income and expenses ==
According to the charter, the party's funds are formed from membership fees, federal budget funds provided per the legislation of the Russian Federation, donations, proceeds from events held by the party and its regional branches, as well as income from entrepreneurial activities, proceeds from civil law transactions, and other receipts not prohibited by law. Membership fees are voluntary. The Presidium of the General Council of the Party determines the procedure for making membership fees and accounting for their payment.

Membership dues have never been the main source of income for the party. In 2002, the party collected 7.7 million rubles in membership fees; in 2008, it collected 157.8 million rubles (7.6% of the party's income). Donations from individuals did not play a significant role for the party - in 2009, 0.3% of the proceeds to the party were received under this item. The main funding source for the party in 2009 was donations from legal entities (63.8% of the party's income) and state funding (26.8% of the party's income). Consolidated financial reports for 2005–2011 are located on the party's official website. Reports for 2005, 2006 and 2008 are not available, and the available ones are presented in non-textual form, which makes it impossible to search for information, including by search engines.

| Source of funds | 2007 | 2009 | 2011 |
|---|---|---|---|
| Total | 2 094 288 660 | 3 337 176 137 | 3 957 811 607 |
| Entrance and membership fees | 111 553 100 | 154 739 687 | 163 215 049 |
| Federal budget funds | 113 881 470 | 894 284 820 | 894 284 820 |
| Donations, total | 1 020 020 229 | 2 218 389 994 | 2 867 409 637 |
| Donations from legal entities | 921 485 630 | 2 127 618 756 | 2 755 645 958 |
| Donations from individuals | 11 053 541 | 10 247 398 | 38 455 859 |
| Donations made in violation of the Law on Political Parties | 85 248 359 | 80 523 840 | 73 307 820 |
| Other receipts not prohibited by law | 844 968 976 | 64 930 575 | 16 065 680 |

Donations made violating the Law on Political Parties include donations from persons who did not indicate all the necessary data in financial documents and donations from state or municipal enterprises or organizations that do not have the right to do so. For example, as a result of checking information on the receipt and expenditure of funds from the Moscow Regional Branch of United Russia for the 2nd quarter of 2012, it was found that a donation was received on 30 May 2012 of 30,000 rubles from OJSC Sergiyevo-Posadsky Electricity Network, the founder of which (share - 100%) is the administration of the Sergiyevo-Posadsky municipal district of the Moscow Oblast. The head of the district, V. S. Korotkov, is also the secretary of the local political council of United Russia. Most of the donations come from regional public foundations to support United Russia. The funds do not disclose who exactly gives them money; however, according to the heads of regional funds, mostly representatives of medium-sized businesses make donations. According to them, there is no "coercion", as donors "contribute as much as they can and want" in response to a written or oral request.

The Tula United Russia Support Fund, headed by the Deputy Governor of the Tula Oblast, Vadim Zherzdev, in 2009 collected the maximum possible 43.3 million rubles under the law. The Moscow Regional Fund, headed by Igor Parkhomenko, First Deputy Chairman of the Government of the Moscow Oblast, raised the same amount. Chairman of the All-Russian Gas Society, State Duma deputy Valery Yazev, according to the Unified State Register of Legal Entities, was listed as the founder of five regional support funds: Yamalo-Nenets, Chelyabinsk, Tyumen, Khanty-Mansiysk, and Kurgan (and collected 83.7 million rubles in total in 2009).

In 2007, the largest donation came from Favor Capital LLC (19.9 million rubles), and three confectionery factories (Rot Front, Krasny Oktyabr, and Babaevsky) made the same contribution of 10 million rubles each. In 2009, the largest donation came from the OJSC "Moscow Television Plant Rubin" (43 million rubles); taking into account its subsidiaries, MTZ Rubin donated 47.8 million rubles. In 2011, the largest donation came from CJSC Mikhailovcement (43 million rubles). According to the calculations of the Vedomosti newspaper, United Russia received 6 billion rubles in donations between 2005 and 2009, with Eurocement Group, Russia's largest cement producer, donating 253 million rubles, Mechel - 72 million, United Confectioners - 58.5 million rubles, and Motovilikha Plants - 48.7 million. With an annual profit of 2.1 million rubles, the Aksai Land enterprise managed to help United Russia with 30 million rubles over three years.

According to Vedomosti, the Peresvet Bank for Charity and Spiritual Development of Russia, whose founders include the Department for External Church Relations of the Moscow Patriarchate and the Moscow Patriarchate and the Kaluga Diocese of the Russian Orthodox Church, supported United Russia for 30 million rubles in 2005–2007; it provided support in 2002–2004, but the amounts remain unknown. In 2007, a letter from the secretary of the Kemerovo branch of United Russia, Gennady Dyudyaev, to the managing director of the Siberian Coal Energy Company was published on the Internet, in which he called the company's refusal to help the party with money a refusal to support the creative course of the incumbent President Vladimir Putin and promised to "inform the Administration of the President and the Governor of the Kemerovo Region about this." On 5 March 2013, TV Rain announced that the Mosenergosbyt company, under the guise of charitable activities, transferred 300 million rubles to the Sozidaniye fund, associated with the United Russia party fund, created in early February 2013 to conduct regional election campaigns.

At the end of March 2013, it became known that OJSC Yaroslavl Supply Company, which is a regional energy monopoly, transferred 55 million rubles to the United Russia Party Support Fund in just six months, which is approximately one-fifth of the company's net profit in the first nine months of 2012. The board of directors of the company, who unanimously voted for the allocation of funds, consists of the secretary of the political council of the Yaroslavl regional branch of United Russia, member of the Federation Council Viktor Rogotsky, and Dmitry Vakhrukov, the son of the former governor of the Yaroslavl Oblast Sergey Vakhrukov, who led the regional electoral list of United Russia in the 2011 State Duma elections. This transfer was contrary to Article 30 of the Federal Law "On Political Parties", which prohibits donations from Russian legal entities with foreign participation to a political party.

In 2014, funding for political parties from the federal budget sharply increased in Russia - now, for every vote received in the elections, the party began to receive 110 rubles (increased from 50 rubles before 2014). As a result, United Russia's revenues increased from 3.4 billion rubles in 2014 to 5.2 billion rubles in 2015. In 2015, United Russia received 5,187,693,300 rubles (first place among political parties in Russia) and spent 4,292,304,600 rubles. The main share of United Russia's income in 2015 was state funding (for votes received in elections) - 68.6% of income, the lowest percentage among parties that received state funding. The party's spending structure in 2015 was as follows:

- Maintenance of the leading bodies of the party – 13.2%
- Maintenance of regional branches – 45.5%
- Transfers to election funds – 8.5%
- Campaign and propaganda activities (establishment and maintenance of own media, news agencies, printing houses, educational institutions, and the release of campaign and propaganda materials) – 14.3%
- Public events, conventions, meetings, and the like – 17.2%
- Other expenses – 1.3%

From these figures, in 2015, the main expenditure of United Russia was the maintenance of the central leadership and regional branches of the party. According to the report of the Golos movement, a third of the companies that donated more than 1 million rubles to United Russia in 2015 began to receive government contracts regularly and an order of magnitude larger than the amount invested. A similar connection was also found among patrons of the parties Communists of Russia and Patriots of Russia (who began to serve orders from the Russian Ministry of Defense). As RBC noted, the 2016 party primaries were won by eight company executives and private donors, who are among the twenty largest sponsors of the party.

=== Financing of party projects ===
On 18 May 2013, at a joint expanded meeting of the supreme and general councils of United Russia, it was announced that party projects would become one of the main activities of the party in the coming period. Then it was first indicated that they would be financed from the federal budget with the participation of the Russian government, chaired by party leader Dmitry Medvedev. Representatives of other political parties announced their readiness to apply to the Constitutional Court of Russia because they saw in these actions a violation of Article 13 of the Constitution of the Russian Federation ("public associations are equal before the law", "no ideology can be established as a state ideology").

== Symbolism ==
The symbol of the party is a marching bear. The party congress on 26 November 2005 adopted decisions on changes in the party's symbolism: instead of a brown bear, a white bear, outlined in blue along the contour, became the party symbol. Above the image of the bear is a fluttering Russian flag, and below the image of the bear is the inscription "United Russia". On 12 July 2001, at the Union of "Unity" and "Fatherland" founding congress, the symbol of the new party was presented - a bear in a cap. Subsequently, it was never used again. The party uses the 1991–1993 Russian flag with an azure stripe in the middle instead of the current blue one.

=== Slogans ===
- "We believe in ourselves and in Russia!" (2003)
- "Russia, forward!", "Let's save and increase!" (2009)
- "Unity, Spirituality, Patriotism" (2010)
- "The future is ours!", "Together we will win!" (2011)
- "To act in the interests of the people is our task", "To hear the voice of everyone is our duty", "To create and protect the future of Russia is our goal", "We made Russia United – Let's make Russia Strong!" (2016)

== Internal groupings and debate clubs ==
At the beginning of 2005, several active members made a public presentation of so-called "socially oriented" and "right-liberal" or "liberal-conservative" approaches to the development of the Russian economy and society. Some media outlets hastened to announce the breakup of the party into several wings and possibly factions, but party chairman Boris Gryzlov rejected this assumption, stating that the party should not be divided into left and right, "there are interests of the country, its citizens, and we are united in defending them." As a result, the intra-party discussion in United Russia is focused on several ideological informal clubs.

The party has four internal groupings organized around common policy interests. In addition, the party uses four internal political clubs to debate policy: the liberal-conservative 4 November Club, social conservative Centre for Social Conservative Politics, conservative liberal State Patriotic Club, and liberal Liberal Club. Based on this division, the party considered entering the 2007 Duma elections as three separate "columns" (liberal, conservative and social), but the idea was subsequently abandoned.

=== 4 November Club ===
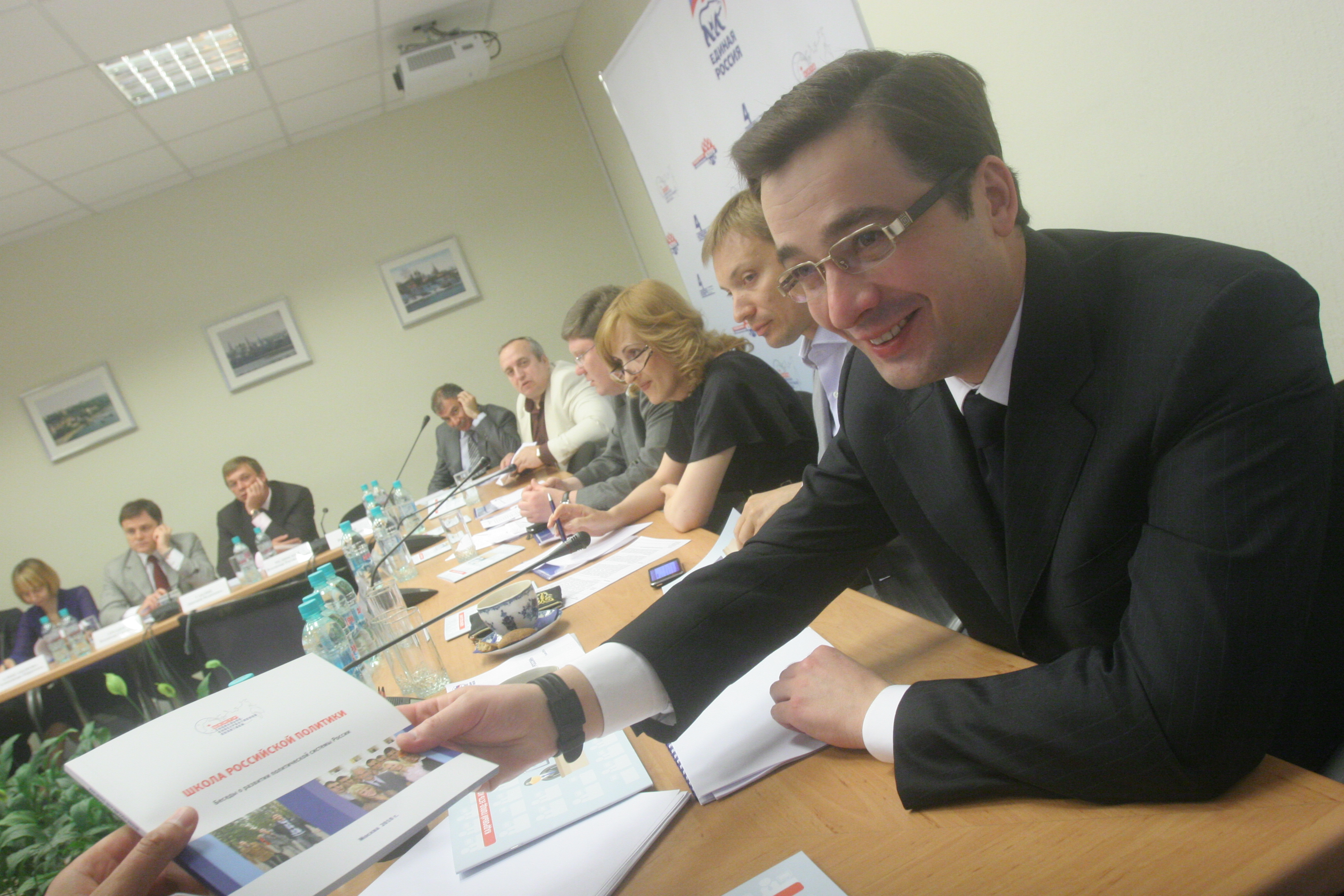
Members of party clubs at a joint meeting in 2010

The goals and objectives of the club include:

- development of a liberal-conservative program for the development of the country and measures for its implementation;
- formation in the country of broad public support for the liberal-conservative path of development;
- organizing a broad discussion among the politically and economically active sections of Russian society;
- involvement in this work of public organizations, intellectuals, journalists;
- assistance in forming a configuration of socio-political forces adequate to the state of society on the eve of the 2007-2008 elections.

The club relies on the ideas formulated in the President's message to the Federal Assembly in 2005. The club's activities are concrete, pragmatic, and even "lobbyist" concerning those initiatives and actions that will be developed by the club or are consonant with its position. The club considers the party the most significant political partner but is a non-party platform. The club holds functions, including conferences, round tables, and seminars. A distinctive feature of the activity is the focus on the regions. One of the co-chairs of the club is the well-known journalist and editor-in-chief of the Expert magazine Valery Fadeyev.

=== Center for Social Conservative Policy ===
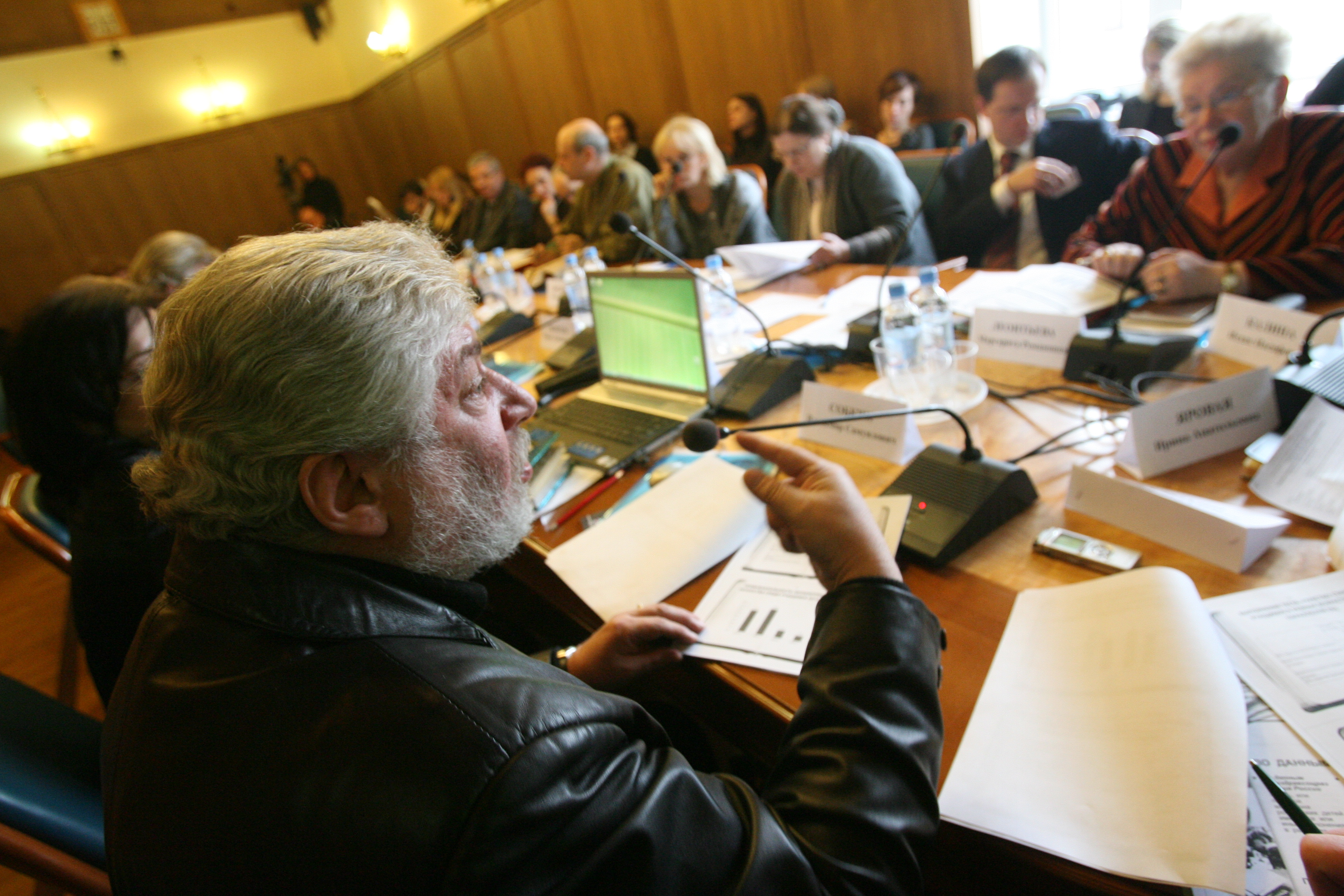
Professor Vladimir Sobkin at a joint meeting of the Center for Social and Conservative Policy and the State Patriotic Club

The non-profit partnership "Center for Social and Conservative Policy" is a private club for discussing social problems. It is a non-state and non-party organization, but each club member is somehow connected with the party and its faction in the State Duma of the Federal Assembly. At the same time, discussions within the club served as a medium for forming both currents in United Russia: liberal (Vladimir Pligin) and social (Andrey Isayev). The heads of relevant committees of the Duma, interested executive authorities, drafters of bills, and experts take part in the work of the "round tables" of the TsSKP, dedicated to certain areas of Russia's modernization. The founders of the non-profit partnership "Center for Social Conservative Policy" are Leonid Goryainov, Igor Demin, Igor Igoshin, Andrey Isayev, Denis Kravchenko, and Konstantin Tarasov.

=== State Patriotic Club ===
The club's main areas of work are:

- national unity and patriotism of action, effective public administration;
- regional development as a condition for ensuring the quality of life of Russian citizens and innovative development of the country.

The ideological basis for the SPC is the Political Declaration of the Club. The authors of the Declaration note that "democracy and the development of public institutions, a competitive economy, and a stable geopolitical position of Russia are impossible without a strong and responsible state that is in organic unity with society on the basis of national history and culture, national traditions." Among the experts who spoke at the meetings of the club at various times were: Minister of Education of the Russian Federation Andrei Fursenko, Minister of Culture of the Russian Federation Aleksandr Avdeyev, Minister of Emergency Situations of the Russian Federation Sergei Shoigu, Head of the Moscow Department of Education Isaac Kalina, Archpriest Vsevolod Chaplin, film director and actor Nikita Mikhalkov, theater director Aleksandr Galibin, People's Artist of Russia Yevgeny Steblov, and Deputy Minister of Industry and Trade of Russia Stanislav Naumov.

Regional branches of the State Patriotic Club operate in 42 regions of Russia. The coordinators of the club are State Duma deputies Irina Yarovaya and Grigory Ivliev.

=== Liberal club ===
On 18 March 2010, the first meeting of the United Russia liberal club was held, which included representatives of business and culture. The club, in particular, included businessman Vadim Dymov, musician Igor Butman, deputy head of the party's central executive committee Andrei Ilnitsky, State Duma deputy Vladimir Medinsky, State Duma deputy and lawyer Andrey Makarov, sociologist Olga Kryshtanovskaya, as well as some members of the 4 November club. The head of the public council under the presidium of the party's general council for interaction with the media and the expert community, Alexey Chesnakov, explained the formation of another liberal club in the party by the fact that the liberals "are not in the niche allocated to them by someone, even the best people." According to him, the difference between the new club and the already existing 4 November club is in organizational forms: a discussion platform without rigid membership.

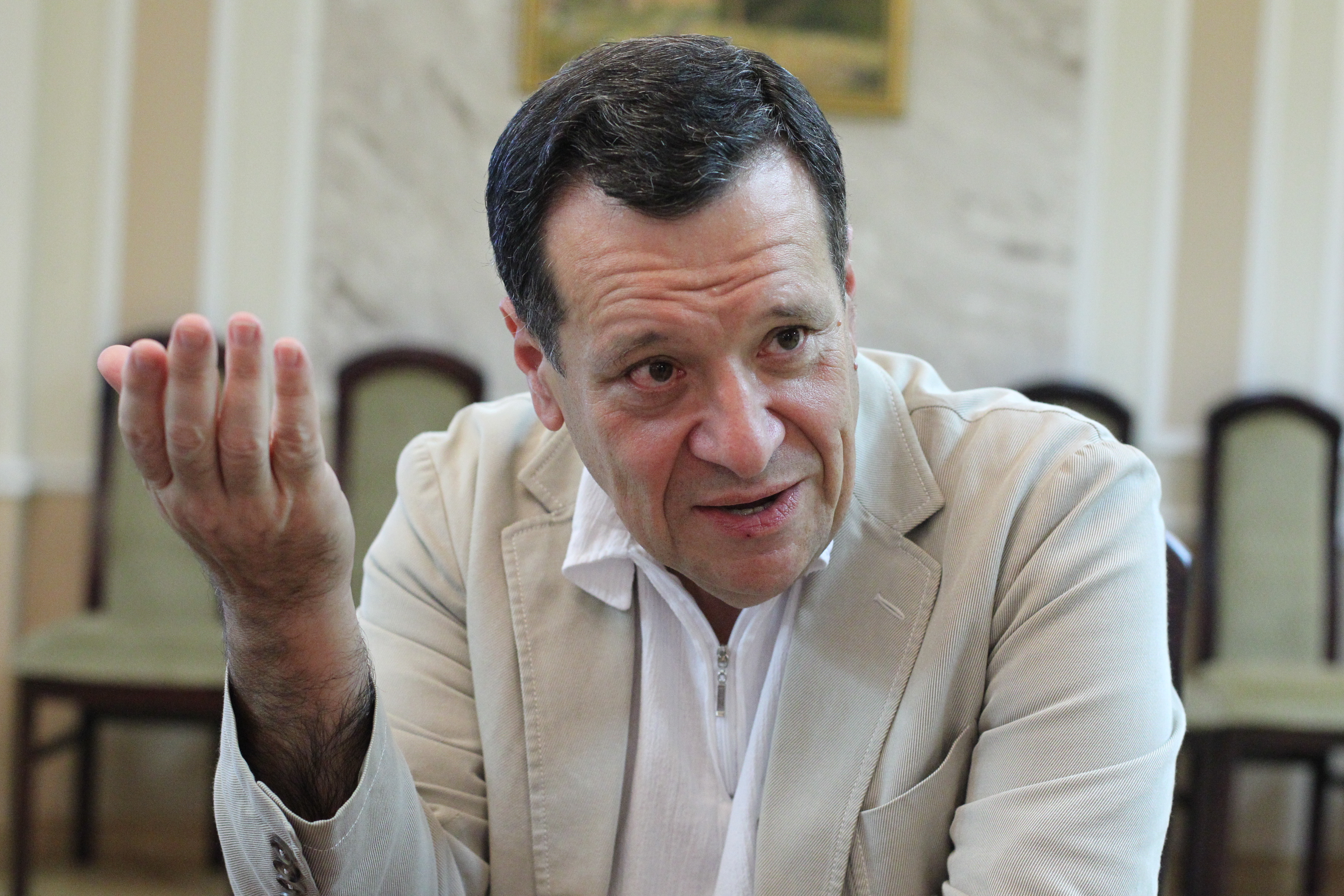
Liberal club and party member Andrey Makarov

On the air of Radio Svoboda, Kryshtanovskaya, answering a question about the tasks of the new right-wing liberal club, stated the following: "I would not say that the party declares that it needs such a new club. These are some members of the party, specific people have united because they feel that they are like-minded people. We are like-minded people, no one invited us anywhere. We just decided to create such a club ourselves in order to express our position. We have a common ideology." The ideology of the liberal club is neoconservatism.

"The crux of the matter is that in terms of the reforms that we would like to see, we are liberals, but in terms of methods we are conservatives, that is, we are against radicalism and against breaking the system. All people who are involved in politics have a choice: to stand on the sidelines, criticize, grin that this is not done in the right way, or dare to enter power and try to influence it from within. Those people who are with me, who create this club, they adhere to this position. Yes, of course, we are not supporters of the destruction of the system, primarily because it will be bad for the people if everything collapses. But trying to influence, trying to modernize the party itself and the policy pursued, I think this is a normal task."

— Olga Kryshtanovskaya

=== Patriotic Platform ===
In 2012, following the results of the 13th Party Congress, a decision was made to transform the state-patriotic club into an independent patriotic platform of the party. Dmitry Medvedev also announced the need to restart the platform at the congress. Irina Yarovaya, Chairman of the State Duma Committee on Security and Anti-Corruption, was approved as the coordinator. As part of the platform's activities, the work of the following federal projects was coordinated: IT Breakthrough, Libraries of Russia, Children's Sports, the Gardener's House is the Support of the Family, Historical Memory, Strong Family, Youth Anti-Corruption Project, People's Control, Runet Development, and Own House.

On 5 April 2017, the Presidium of the General Council of United Russia approved Dmitry Sablin, deputy of the State Duma and first deputy chairman of the All-Russian Public Organization of Veterans "Military Brotherhood", as the coordinator of the party's Patriotic Platform. The change of coordinator was connected with the need to intensify intra-party work and structural changes in the management of the platform.

=== Entrepreneurial Platform ===
On 10 March 2016, the Entrepreneurial Platform was created, the co-coordinators of which were the founder of the Korkunov chocolate brand Andrey Korkunov, the head of the Splat-Cosmetics company Evgeny Demin, and State Duma deputy and chairman of the Board of the Kuzbass Chamber of Commerce and Industry Tatyana Alekseyeva. The first two also entered the supreme council of United Russia. By the end of the month, a presentation of a program of priority steps to support business was promised, which will then be given to the government.

== Faction in the State Duma ==
After the 2003 parliamentary elections, United Russia, having accepted into its faction the deputies who passed through single-mandate constituencies, the majority of independents, all deputies from the People's Party and those who switched from other parties, received a constitutional majority, which allowed it to pursue its line in the Duma, not taking into account the opinions and objections of the opposition (CPRF, LDPR, Rodina, independent deputies).

The book Operation United Russia, written by Forbes and Vedomosti journalists Ilya Zhegulev and Lyudmila Romanova, describes the functioning of the United Russia faction in the State Duma:

Neither Putin nor Surkov succeeded in turning the nomenklatura into a party of creativity. Despite the ambitions of individual party bosses, no one abolished the system of manual control from the Kremlin either for United Russia itself or for its faction in the State Duma. And how else to manage three hundred deputies who are not united by a common ideology, or by common business interests, or even by common enemies, artificially gathered into one faction, perhaps with the sole purpose of ensuring the correct vote? In addition, not all United Russia members were ready to immediately believe the words of the new Duma speaker Boris Gryzlov, who said that "the parliament is not a place for discussion." In 2004, many tried to defend the interests of the companies that delegated them to parliament and the most ordinary common sense, and the punitive system has not yet been fully operational.

For the convenience of management, the huge faction was divided into 4 groups, headed by Vladimir Pekhtin, Vladimir Katrenko, Vyacheslav Volodin, and Oleg Morozov. The latter was the least organized - single-mandate members and "defectors" from other parties flocked here. Morozov himself complained to fellow deputies that he had gathered "dissidents". Most of the lobbyists and those who had their heads on their shoulders got to Morozov. This was difficult in the Duma.

The working day began like this: deputies come half an hour before the plenary session and receive "handouts". The main one is the table of issues put to the vote on the agenda. In the last column, it was already noted in advance how it was recommended to vote - "for", "against", or "abstain". That is, there was no need to discuss anything.

"Cushy work. And well paid. Those who voted correctly were entitled to a monthly bonus," says a former United Russia deputy. In addition to the official salary of 90,000 rubles, they also paid about $3,000 more monthly in an envelope from "socially responsible" entrepreneurs - companies that delegated their representatives to the Duma. "Not bad money for a man who does not have his own enterprise. But for the slightest fault they could deduct 50% of the allowance, or they could not give money at all. And everything was built on such things," the deputy says.

—

After the Duma elections in 2007, United Russia again had a constitutional majority. The number of deputies in the United Russia faction amounted to 315 people. Due to the large size of the faction and to improve the efficiency of its management, four groups were created in the faction, the leaders of which are Artur Chilingarov, Vladimir Pekhtin, Tatiana Yakovleva, and Nikolay Bulayev. The leader of the faction was Boris Gryzlov. After the 2011 elections, the size of the faction decreased to 238 deputies, which, although it retained the ability for it to adopt federal laws without taking into account other opinions (quorum - 226 deputies), created the need to support other factions for the adoption of federal constitutional laws and amendments to the Constitution of the Russian Federation (the quorum for the adoption of which is 300 deputies). In the 2016 State Duma elections, held on party lists and in single-mandate districts, United Russia received a record number of seats for the party: 340.

=== Leadership of the faction in the State Duma of the VIII convocation ===
- Faction leader: Vladimir Vasilyev
- First deputy heads of the faction: Dmitry Vyatkin, Vyacheslav Makarov
- Heads of intra-factional groups – deputy heads of the faction: Aleksandr Borisov, Vladimir Ivanov, Ivan Kvitka, Viktor Seliverstov, Adalbi Shkhagoshev
- Deputy heads of faction: Andrey Isayev, Yevgeny Revenko, Sergey Morozov, Igor Kastyukevich

United Russia has created an expert council for legislative activities, whose task is to evaluate all the initiatives of the members of the faction and their elaboration before submitting them to the State Duma. It included members of the governing bodies of the party, representatives of the faction, and party experts. The first meeting of the council took place on 14 December 2021. Legislative initiatives are assumed to first come to the coordinating council for a preliminary assessment. Then, if necessary, they will be taken up by the working groups of the expert council, which will further develop the bills. The decision to create such a scheme was made on 10 November by the Presidium of the General Council of United Russia.

== Representation in the leadership of the State Duma ==
Since 2003, the Chairman of the State Duma has been a deputy from the United Russia faction: Boris Gryzlov (2003–2011), Sergey Naryshkin (2011–2016), and Vyacheslav Volodin (since 2016). First Deputy Chairman of the State Duma from the party included Oleg Morozov (2005–2011) and Alexander Zhukov (since 21 December 2011). Deputy Chairmen of the State Duma from the party are Olga Timofeeva (since 9 October 2017), Sergey Neverov (since 4 December 2011), Pyotr Tolstoy (since 5 October 2016), Irina Yarovaya (since 5 October 2016). The head of the United Russia faction in the State Duma from the party were Boris Gryzlov (2003–2011), Andrey Vorobyov (2011–2012), Vladimir Vasilyev (2012–2017), and Sergey Neverov (since 9 October 2017).

== Opinions about the party, criticism, accusations, and scandals ==
=== Rating polls ===
According to a poll by the Levada Center at the beginning of 2021, only 27% of Russians would vote for United Russia if elections to the State Duma were held in the near future. This is the lowest support rating for the party among all published polls since mid-2016. In August 2020, 31% of respondents were ready to vote for the party.

=== Support ===
A party that has been in power for many years always bears a heavy responsibility for all unresolved issues, including perhaps even those for which it is not directly responsible.
But the truth is that United Russia is a stabilizing element of our political system.

— President of the Russian Federation (since 2012), leader of United Russia (2008-2012) Vladimir Putin, 2016

United Russia is not an ordinary public organization but a real political force: the party of leaders, the party in power. Almost the entire administrative elite is in your ranks: outstanding scientists and artists, public figures and entrepreneurs, representatives of all nationalities, professions and religions, veterans and youth. <...> United Russia will be able to achieve change only if it changes itself; I think this is an obvious thing. The party must always be modern to not become obsolete and not lag behind life and the voters.

— President of the Russian Federation (2008-2012) Dmitry Medvedev, speech at the 11th Congress of United Russia, 21 November 2009

Our ideology is gradual and confident development, constant production, and accumulation of improvements. In the socio-economic sphere, this is the accumulation of social justice in a market economy. In the development of society, it is the accumulation of innovations, values, and human and social capital. It is the accumulation of democracy and trust in political institutions, primarily in elections.

— Secretary of the Presidium of the General Council of United Russia Vyacheslav Volodin, 2010.

There was a final identification in the ideology field- active conservatism. The party has become a real driving force of modernization. It should ensure the creation of a national modernization coalition to carry out modernization. No political force has such a network of intellectual centers, including clubs.

— Director General of the Agency for Political and Economic Communications and United Russia ideologue Dmitry Orlov

... Speaking of United Russia, it is useful to remember that the position of a critic is always more convenient, but this party is the backbone of a stable modern political system, with all its pluses and minuses. It is its members who perform a huge amount of routine work. Of course, there are no aliens - everything is not without birth spots, but it is ridiculous to blame only party members for this. It is important not to reduce the issues of the country's political structure to the demonization of United Russia and its members, especially since there are very different people there. Criticism is necessary, especially since the understanding of the viciousness of the one-party system reigns in society.

— TV and radio presenter Vladimir Solovyov, presenter of Russian socio-political programs on the Russia-1 TV channel, 2012

…A spirit of unity was felt at the congress. The congress showed that this party is really powerful and strong. The atmosphere in Russian society today shows again that United Russia is the country's leading political organization and has many chances to win the parliamentary elections.

— Aydin Mirzazade, head of the delegation of the New Azerbaijan Party at the XII Congress of the United Russia political party (September 24, 2011), member of the Azerbaijani Parliament, 2011

According to correspondence published in February 2012, employees of the central executive committee of United Russia (Sergey Gorbachev, Pavel Danilin, Alexander Dupin, Yefim Kuts), under the leadership of Alexey Chesnakov, have been creating custom publications (at least 250) since the spring of 2011 in support of the party and criticizing the opposition. Subsequently, these materials were published in several online publications (Aktualnye Kommentarii, Obshaya Gazeta, Newsland, Infox.ru, The Moscow Post, Utro.ru, Vzglyad.ru, Vek, Polit.ru) and paper newspapers (Argumenty i Fakty, Komsomolskaya Pravda, Moskovskij Komsomolets, Nezavisimaya Gazeta) under the guise of editorial texts and credited to fictitious names.

=== Criticism ===
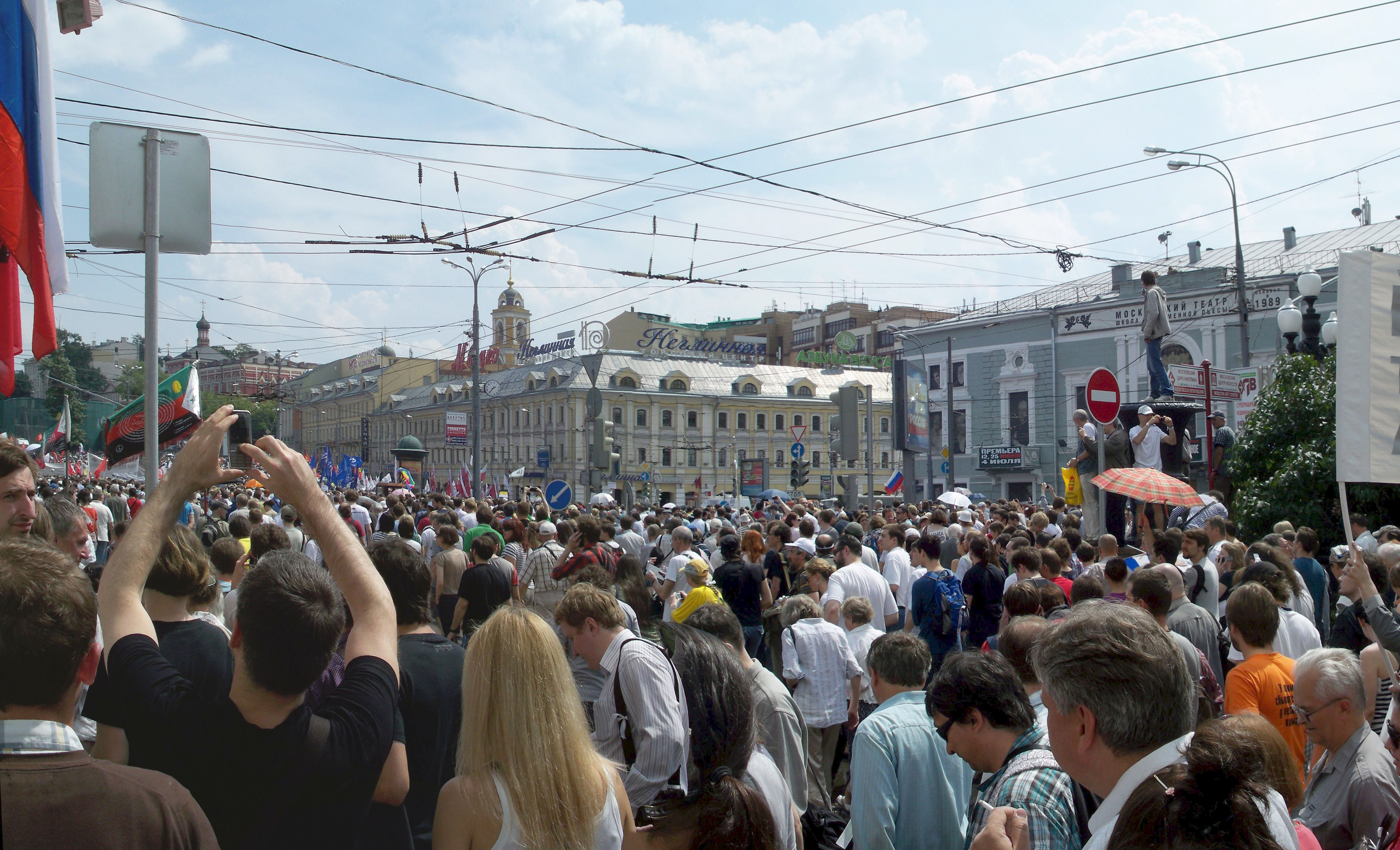
Russians protest against Putin's re-election in 2012

United Russia has no ideology, no clear program, but has two goals - to stay in the chair and stick to the main money bag - the budget.

— Communist Party leader Gennady Zyuganov, 2010

United Russia was created as a center-right, conservative party. True, the leadership of United Russia has taken several steps to the left, but this does not fundamentally change the situation. "United Russia" continues to vacillate between the positions of "statists" and liberals.

— Former Prime Minister of the Russian Federation and academician Yevgeny Primakov, 2012

United Russia reminds me of a worse copy of the CPSU... Yes, they have everything. There is a parliament, courts, a president, a prime minister, and so on... and all this is on the ground. But you know - more imitation. There is no efficient operation.

— Former General Secretary of the CPSU, President of the USSR, and Nobel laureate Mikhail Gorbachev

United Russia is a euphemism for the state bureaucracy, a screen for using administrative resources.

— Vadim Sergienko, an expert at the Center for Problem Analysis

In 2003, political scientist V. Bely called the party "a colossus with feet of clay" because, in his opinion, the main source of its strength is reliance on Vladimir Putin and power. Some politicians believe that United Russia has become, or is becoming, similar to the CPSU. In 2005, political scientist Vladimir Vasiliev, in an interview with the REGNUM News Agency, said that after making changes to the electoral legislation that are beneficial for the ruling party, "United Russia will turn out to be not a combat-ready army for Putin, but a convoy that needs to be saturated." Opponents of the party often use ideological clichés in relation to it. In particular, the leader of the Youth Yabloko, Ilya Yashin, in 2004; the leader of the Communist Party of the Russian Federation, Gennady Zyuganov, in 2008; and the leader of the Liberal Democratic Party, Vladimir Zhirinovsky, in 2015 used the expression "aggressively obedient majority" concerning the party and its faction in the State Duma of Russia.

The party is criticized both in Russia and abroad. For example, The Washington Post claimed that United Russia "pushed through a series of laws that critics say are designed to prevent genuine electoral struggle and consolidate the party's dominance." According to the adopted laws, parties must have their organizations throughout the country and have at least 50,000 members. According to a Washington Post journalist, "party registration is overseen by the Russian Ministry of Justice, which is accused of intimidating those who oppose the government. In order to secure representation in parliament, any party must obtain the support of at least 7% of the voters, and if it fails, the votes cast for the party are distributed among the larger parties, which increases the proportional share of parliamentary seats given to these parties. Political analysts believe that United Russia received the greatest benefit from the introduction of the 7 percent threshold." Party representatives, on the contrary, believe that "its policy leads to the creation of a competitive system of parties and may even weaken the position of the party in the next parliament."

Commenting on the 2007 Duma election campaign, The Wall Street Journal wrote that United Russia and Russian President Vladimir Putin received "huge amounts of airtime on Kremlin-controlled television channels" even though, according to the newspaper, the opposition's election campaign was taken off the air, and its publications were confiscated. The Wall Street Journal wrote that government officials pressured subordinates and directors of large companies to vote for United Russia and that, according to some allegations, company employees were instructed by management to photograph their completed ballot before putting it in the ballot box. According to journalist Chrystia Freeland, published in The New York Times, "We have known since 1996 that Russia is not a democracy. We now know that Russia is not a dictatorship controlled by one party, one spiritual hierarchy, or one dynasty. This is a regime ruled by one person. "There is no party," said one of Russia's leading independent economists. "All politics is built around one person."

The party has been repeatedly criticized for the lack of a real program. On 8 April 2011, Russian political scientist Gleb Pavlovsky, in an interview, in particular, said: "We see chaos, where no one is sure of anything: six months before the elections, the ruling party does not know what its program is and whose interests it will represent". On 27 October 2011, Gazeta.Ru published an article titled Vacuum Bomb of Power. The authorities failed to come up with not only a program for the elections, but at least a more or less fresh idea", which states that the authorities admit that they do not have any program of action yet; that the "Program of People's Initiatives" is not a program, but a set of wishes, considerations, which cannot be taken as a guide to action. "The programmatic appeal of the United Russia party", published on the website of the party, the author of Gazeta.ru calls "something" that the authorities also do not hold for the program of action, after the publication of which a joke was born in the circles of the political elite: "In the next election of V. Putin, the program will be a joke about V. Putin.". Gennady Zyuganov, in an interview with Novaya Gazeta, spoke about the second stage of the 12th Congress of United Russia, held on 27 November 2011:

Yesterday's congress reminded me of the worst examples of mass meetings of the CPSU; however, the country was smarter, more powerful, and more independent then. At the Congress of United Russia, there was neither a serious analysis, program for the near future, interesting decisions, or honest assessment of what is happening in the world and our country. And absolutely no real proposals for the next six years of government - nothing to discuss. There is an attempt to wash off opponents by exposing them in an unfavorable light, which looks immoral.

— Gennady Zyuganov

Former Moscow mayor Yuri Luzhkov, who once stood at the beginning of the creation of the party and left it, called United Russia a "political corpse". Yevgeny Urlashov, mayor of Yaroslavl, 19 June 2013: "The United Russia party in the [Yaroslavl] region is the most corrupt, arrogant, and engages in blackmail, bribery, deceit, and hates people." Notably, a month later, by the decision of the Basmanny District Court of Moscow, Urlashov was temporarily removed from office for taking a bribe; in 2016, he was sentenced to 12.5 years in prison with a sentence in a strict regime colony. United Russia's support for the raising of the retirement age in 2018 led to the party's ratings to fall to its lowest level since 2011. Mass protests against the measure were also held. The pension reform also led to a negative impact on the party's performance in regional elections later in the year.

==== "Party of crooks and thieves" ====
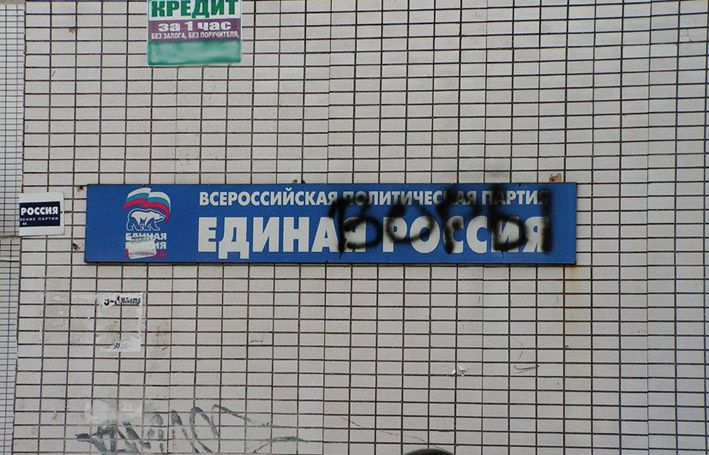
United Russia local office sign in 2011. The graffiti states: 'THIEVES'.

United Russia has come in for criticism that it is "the party of crooks and thieves" (Russian: партия жуликов и воров, abbreviated as PZhiV, a term coined by activist Alexei Navalny in February 2011) due to the continuing prevalence of corruption in Russia. He argues it by the presence in the party of major officials and businessmen involved in corruption and criminal cases. In October 2011, Novaya Gazeta published an article describing how members of the public were writing the slogan on banknotes in protest. In December 2011, Putin rejected the accusation of corruption, saying that it was a general problem that was not restricted to one particular party: "They say that the ruling party is associated with theft, with corruption, but it's a cliché related not to a certain political force, it's a cliché related to power. ... What's important, however, is how the ruling government is fighting these negative things". A poll taken in November 2011 found that more than one-third of Russians agreed with the characterisation of United Russia as "the party of crooks and thieves".

After the 2011 legislative elections, a few leaders within United Russia called for investigations of fraud and reform of the party. According to the Levada Center in April 2013, about half of Russians agreed with this characterization of the party. On 28 September 2010, Boris Nemtsov spoke about United Russia on the air of Radio Liberty, saying that "all the people know that this is a party of thieves and corrupt officials." According to the leader of the Liberal Democratic Party, Vladimir Zhirinovsky, he used this expression back in 2009, and Nemtsov simply intercepted these words. In April 2013, during a sociological survey conducted by the Levada Center, the majority of Russians surveyed (51%) agreed with the characterization of United Russia as a "party of crooks and thieves."

==== Pension reform of 2018 ====
The support in the summer and autumn of 2018 by the Duma deputies from the United Russia party of the government bill on changes in the pension system, which boils down to raising the retirement age, sharply reduced the level of public confidence in the party, as well as in the president and the Government of Russia. In the eyes of many ordinary citizens, belonging to the "United Russia" has become a fact that discredits the politician, and not belonging, on the contrary, has become a virtue. This, in particular, affected the gubernatorial elections in a number of regions in September 2018, where candidates from the opposition parties won with a significant advantage.

=== Allegations of violations of the electoral law ===
==== Regional elections (2008-2009) ====
During regional elections and elections of mayors of Russian cities in March 2009, individual cases of voter bribery, falsification of voting results in favor of some representatives of the United Russia party, and their use of negative campaigning were recorded. On 1 March 2009, police in Murmansk detained a group of citizens distributing bottles of vodka to voters in exchange for votes for United Russia candidate Mikhail Savchenko, the current mayor of Murmansk. One of the detainees wrote to the police that he had personally received 600,000 rubles to organize the bribery. In Karachay-Cherkessia, according to the protocol of precinct No. 50, out of 2,664 voters, 1,272 voters (47.8%) voted for United Russia, and in the protocol of the Republican Election Commission (RIC) in the same precinct, 2,272 votes for United Russia were already listed (85.3%). The votes were taken from the Communist Party of the Russian Federation and the Patriots of Russia party. Following a decision of the city court of Cherkessk, 1000 votes were taken from United Russia and distributed between the Communist Party of the Russian Federation and the Patriots of Russia. During the elections of the mayor of Tomsk on 15 March 2009, on the personal instructions of the chairman of the regional election commission, Yelman Yusubov, it was impossible to demand from the voter a document (a business trip order, a travel document, a referral to a doctor, etc.) confirming his absence on the day of voting at his place of residence, which led to mass illegal early voting of students and significantly affected the outcome of voting in favor of the United Russia candidate, Mayor Nikolai Nikolaychuk, who, according to official data, won the election.

A telephone poll conducted by the local television company TV2 in the Rush Hour program showed that opposition candidate Alexander Deyev was winning the mayoral election by a wide margin, after which there were immediate failures at the city telephone exchange, and the poll was disrupted. In one of the maternity hospitals, women in labor were forced to vote for Nikolaichuk; otherwise, their babies were threatened with harm. In the lists of voters now and then, there were unidentifiable people registered in the apartments of the townspeople. Some residents of Tomsk were surprised to see the names of their deceased neighbors among those who voted. As a result of such machinations, the turnout of voters from 17:00 to 19:00 sharply increased by 7,000 people. Representatives of the electoral committee then could not clearly explain this fact. Even before voting legally ended at 20:00, the sign of "Mayor Nikolaychuk Nikolai Alekseevich" was hung in the administration of Tomsk. In the reception room of the United Russia deputies of the regional and city dumas Chingis Akatayev and Denis Molotkov, newspapers with negative press directed against Deyev were found. Tomsk Governor Viktor Kress, fearing that the candidate from the party in power would lose the election, put pressure on voters, saying several times on local TV channels that he would not work with the mayor if opposition self-nominated Alexander Deyev became the mayor. Moreover, he slandered Deyev, saying that he was convicted.

According to the CEC of the Russian Federation, United Russia won 77.3% of the vote in the municipal elections in St. Petersburg. On 30 March 2009, Anton Chumachenko, a member of United Russia, who allegedly won in one of the districts of St. Petersburg, in an open letter to the residents of the Morskoy district, called the methods of his fellow party members "a cynical mockery of the right", stating that "the results of the vote in our district were frankly rigged. From all the protocols of the six precinct election commissions, it follows that I was not included in the top five candidates who received the majority of votes." Yabloko candidate Boris Vishnevsky, whose victory appeared on the CEC website the night after the election (according to zaks.ru) but then disappeared, claimed that the votes were allocated to his rivals from United Russia. During the election campaign for the post of head of the city of Vologda (2008), candidate Alexander Lukichev (a member of the A Just Russia party) was removed from the election on charges of violating intellectual property rights. Ye. Shulepov, a United Russia candidate, won the election.

==== Federal election irregularities ====
===== Elections to the State Duma (2007) =====
The party has been repeatedly accused of illegal use of administrative resources (for example, the so-called campaign assignments to recruit supporters). One of the well-known cases was the confession of the mayor of Khabarovsk, Alexander Sokolov, before the Duma elections in 2007: "Given the special role of United Russia, we recommended that the chairmen of precinct commissions join the party." In addition, precedents were recorded in the Duma elections of 2007, when up to 109% of votes were for United Russia. There were cases of massive ballot stuffing, forcing students to vote under the threat of failing exams, etc.

===== Elections of the President of Russia (2008) =====
On 7 October 2011, the leader of the A Just Russia party, Sergey Mironov, published on his blog a copy of an internal document of the St. Petersburg headquarters of United Russia, which describes in detail the technologies for falsifying the protocols of precinct election commissions and instructions for stuffing ballots in the 2008 presidential elections in Russia.

I tend to trust this document. We are faced with the fact that at the polling station, they give out a deliberately inaccurate copy of the protocol: either the seal is not the same, then the time is not the same, then not all the names are indicated, then not all members of the commission. Our observers take copies in which all figures are correct. And then they refuse us in court because the copies of the protocols do not correspond to the “original”. In particular, when the communists tried to challenge the results of the 2009 elections in court, 800 claims were dismissed on similar grounds.

— Head of the legal service of the Communist Party of the Russian Federation Vadim Solovyov to Moskovskiye Novosti

In the presidential elections of Russia on 2 March 2008, such violations were noticed as giving a bribe to an observer, multiple voting by one person (and without documents), and issuing already filled-out ballots to voters.

===== Elections to the State Duma (2011) =====
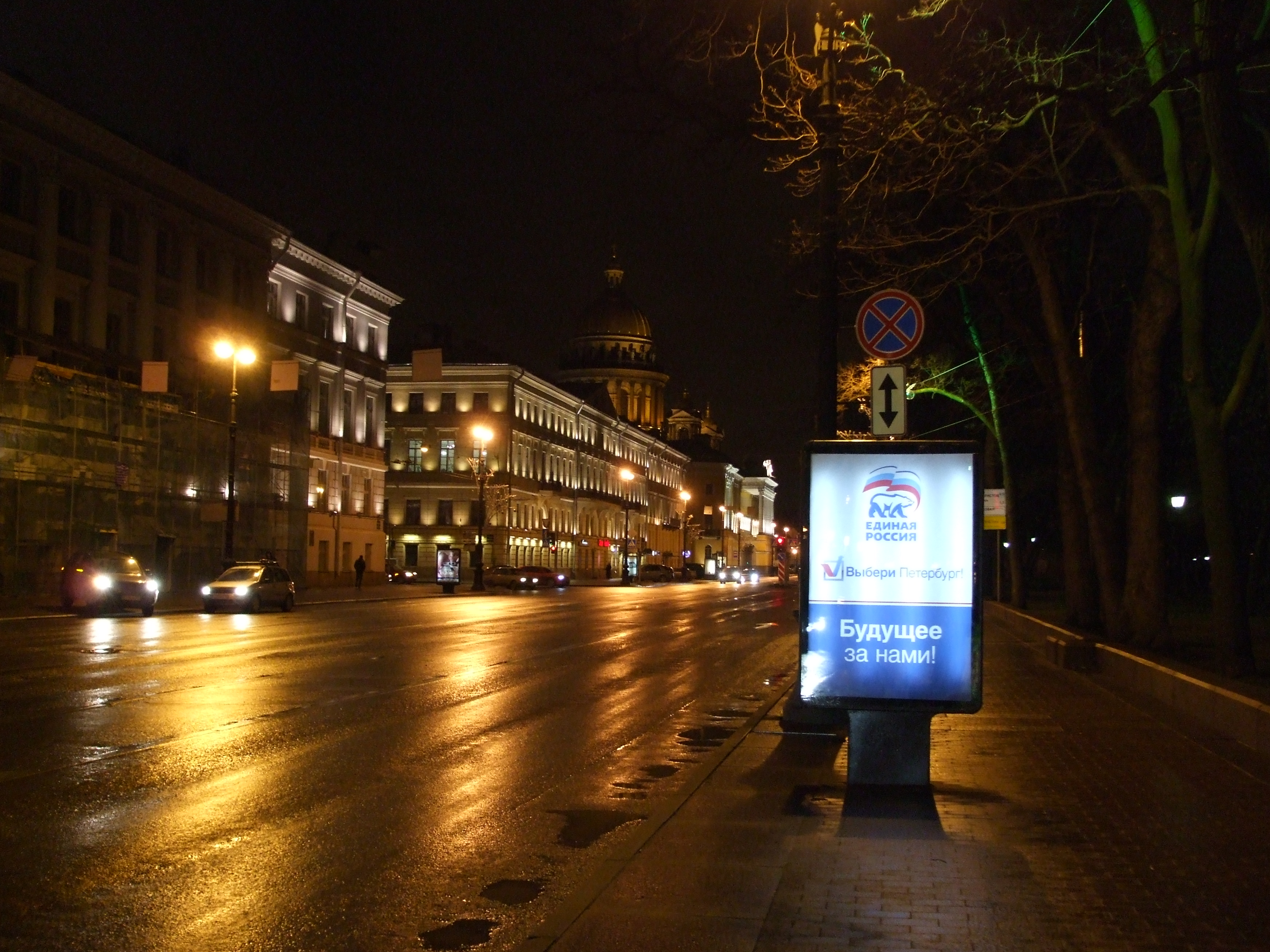
One of the many posters of "United Russia", located in St. Petersburg on election day, 4 December 2011 (violation of the law)

By the start of the 2011 federal election campaign, Gazeta.Ru and the Association for the Protection of Voters' Rights GOLOS launched an interactive map of law violations, which any participant in the elections could take part in creating. As of 7 November 2011, there were 956 messages in the database of the map of violations, of which 403 related to "using the possibilities of power to create advantages"; as of 1 December 2011, 4316 and 1674 in total; according to the results of the elections, 7801 and 2024. United Russia then created a website to "confront opposition violations" in the elections.

On 24 October 2011, on the website of State Duma deputy Gennady Gudkov, the abstracts of the report were published, which the governor of the Moscow Oblast, Boris Gromov, allegedly delivered on 6 October 2011 in the Odintsovo district. Gudkov considered this report a "plan for preparing election fraud" in the Moscow Oblast. According to him, in the report, Gromov called: "to aim local administrative bodies and the apparatus of administrations to suppress any attempts to violate the electoral legislation", "to contribute to the filling of financial resources", "to try to limit opponents in advertising", and "to pay attention to pre-election work in municipalities where the positions of United Russia are not so unambiguous." According to Gudkov, the violations are not limited to one report: on 15 September, the Minister of Press and Information of the region, Sergey Moiseyev, "instructed" 56 chief editors of regional and municipal media in approximately the same style.

On 24 October 2011, the Election Commission of the Jewish Autonomous Oblast warned United Russia in the Jewish Autonomous Region for placing banners violating the electoral law. On 27 October 2011, a video appeared on the Internet where Denis Agashin, a member of the General Council of United Russia and the head of the administration of the city of Izhevsk, called on pensioners to vote for United Russia, saying that the financing of the city depends on the results of the vote. Sergei Zheleznyak, First Deputy Secretary of the Presidium of the General Council of the United Russia party, said that Agashin is not a candidate for deputy from the party and held a meeting with representatives of veteran organizations "on his own initiative." On 18 November 2011, the Leninsky District Court of Izhevsk found Agashin guilty of illegal campaigning and fined him 2,000 rubles. On 5 November 2011, the head of the administration of the President of Udmurtia and the government of the republic, Alexander Goriyanov, announced on camera the scheme "money for votes in favor of United Russia":

Sarapul was given 30 million for roads and sidewalks this summer. Glazov was given ten. In the previous elections, Glazovites, we ourselves refused these twenty million from those good roads you could drive on. And it won't be different. Because the projects, in general, in the country, many various projects are supervised by United Russia. And they determine how to work with which territory.

—

According to the aforementioned First Deputy Secretary of the Presidium of the General Council of the Party, Sergei Zheleznyak, it is quite logical to link the socio-economic development of a region or municipality with United Russia since it is United Russia that proposes budget projects related to the socio-economic development of the region and votes for them. According to the Kommersant newspaper, since 2 November, a "signature collection form in support of United Russia" has been distributed among Voronezh civil servants, in which the regional governor Alexey Gordeyev asks to support the party in the elections to the State Duma. As a sign of consent, officials must put their signature under this, having previously indicated their addresses and telephone numbers.

According to the news agency URA.ru, on the evening of 5 November in Yekaterinburg, police detained a resident, Daniil Kornev, on whose car there was a sticker, privately made by the townspeople, with the well-known aphorism of Alexei Navalny "United Russia is a party of crooks and thieves" and an image of a bear with a bag in its mouth against the backdrop of a map of Russia. An administrative offense report was drawn up against him (Part 1 of Article 5.12 of the Code of the Russian Federation on Administrative Offenses "Production, distribution or placement of campaign materials in violation of election legislation"), from which it follows the sticker is campaigning for United Russia not paid for from the election fund, and a subpoena was served. In Pervouralsk, local businessman Vitaly Listratkin was fined 1,000 rubles for distributing forty mugs with a statement about United Russia. On 31 October, at the office of the Parnassus branch in Yekaterinburg, law enforcement officers seized a batch of stickers with Navalny's phrase and a computer.

On 6 November 2011, journalist and blogger Oleg Kozyrev discovered an almost complete "confusing" similarity between the campaign materials of United Russia and the Moscow Electoral Commission. Subsequently, it turned out that under the slogan "Moscow for life, for people" and the design accompanying it, there was a simultaneous advertising campaign, firstly, by the Moscow government, secondly, by the Moscow City Electoral Committee, and thirdly, by the United Russia party. The Central Election Commission of the Russian Federation and the Moscow City Electoral Committee did not find any contradictions to the electoral legislation in that the election billboards of the United Russia party are similar to the Moscow City Electoral Committee's public service announcements dedicated to the December elections. A similar point of view was expressed by Senator Valery Ryazansky, member of the Bureau of the Supreme Council of the United Russia party, on Echo of Moscow radio:

… yes, there is some similarity, as they say, but I say again that per the law, the party that decides to hang billboards coordinates their sketches with a mandatory commission. Therefore, there can be no claims against United Russia.

—

Also on 6 November 2011, a video appeared on the Internet with information that in Murmansk, United Russia members concluded agreements for "self-agitation" at 1,500 rubles per vote given to the party and 250 rubles per brought friend. On 23 November 2011, Novaya Gazeta published an article about the correspondence between United Russia, the department for the media, press, broadcasting, and mass communications of the Krasnodar Krai, Internet trolls, and regional officials, from which it follows that pro-United Russia comments in the blogosphere are most often written by officials and deputies for money, and that United Russia is conducting its election campaign in the Kuban with a blunt and blatant use of administrative resources. The election posters of the ruling party, which are hung all over the country, are pasted during working hours by the same officials who are united by Internet mailings conducted by the Kuban media department on instructions from Moscow.

On 23 November 2011, Gazeta.ru published an article with a transcript of a closed speech by Alexander Aksyonov, head of the Sokolinaya Gora District Council in Moscow. The transcript explains in detail how the plan to collect votes for United Russia should be carried out. Aksyonov demands the heads of enterprises collect absentee certificates from their subordinates and hand them over to officials so that United Russia can gain 58% in the elections in Moscow (even though according to a closed Foundation "Public Opinion" poll conducted at the start of the campaign and published in Gazeta.ru, United Russia had a rating of 29% in Moscow). According to RIA Novosti, the Moscow City Electoral Committee stated that the information contained in the article "is unfounded" and that the audio recording raises doubts about its authenticity.

On 21 December 2011, a member of the regional political council of United Russia, Vladimir Semago, appeared in Novaya Gazeta with an article titled "This is not a falsification of the election results, but a conspiracy to forcibly retain power". In the article, he stated that a group of conspirators created a criminal community to rig parliamentary elections to retain power. The community included the CEC headed by Vladimir Churov and the chairmen of grassroots election commissions. Similar communities were created at the regional level in executive power structures. The conspirators' activities received support from the FSB, the Ministry of Internal Affairs and, most likely, were coordinated at the very top. Such actions fall under articles 210 and 278 of the Criminal Code of the Russian Federation and are punishable by imprisonment from 10 to 20 years.

Scientists from the Medical University of Vienna have proposed a method for assessing the presence of electoral fraud. As a result, they proved that there were falsifications in the elections of the Russian President in 2012 and to the State Duma of the Russian Federation in 2011; in particular, ballot stuffing for some candidates. The article appeared in the journal Proceedings of the National Academy of Sciences and is available in the public domain.

== Notable departures from the party ==
Former co-chairman of the Party Supreme Council Yury Luzhkov, who left the party simultaneously with a resignation from the post of mayor of Moscow, speaking on 21 October 2010 as a dean of the International University in Moscow with the lecture "Development of Moscow and the Renaissance of Russia" and answering questions from the audience, said that he was always wary of United Russia since there were no democratic institutions. "The irony of fate: I am one of the founding fathers of the United Russia party. My attitude towards it has always been warily critical." "I always told the party chairman Boris Gryzlov that we have no discussions. We always and in everything obey the administration." "When the 122 federal law on the monetization of benefits was adopted, there were two thousand comments to it; we accepted it without discussion. Then there was the popular phrase: Duma is no place for discussions. You can not do it this way!". "The party is a servant, and I left it," Luzhkov concluded.

Other famous personalities that left the party include State Duma deputy (2000–2016) and ex-governor of the Krasnoyarsk Krai Valery Zubov, State Duma deputy (1999–2005) and ex-governor of the Chelyabinsk Oblast Mikhail Yurevich, ex-head of Khakassia Aleksey Lebed, ballerina and actress Anastasia Volochkova, farmer and politician Zhoakim Krima, writer Yevgeny Kasimov, General Yevgeny Yuryev, former State Duma deputies Vladimir Semago and Anatoly Yermolin, director of the Lenin State Farm CJSC and, at the time of leaving the party, the operating deputy of the Moscow Oblast Duma Pavel Grudinin, former State Duma deputy Igor Morozov, Deputy Prime Minister of the Irkutsk Region Alexander Bitarov, former head of the Bolshaya Okhta municipality of St. Petersburg Nikolai Payalin, ex-head of the administration of several St. Petersburg regions and brother of politician Arkady Dvorkovich Mikhail Dvorkovich, and cousin of Vladimir Putin Igor Putin.

In addition to criminal grounds in some cases (see below), for political reasons, the Governor of the Stavropol Krai Alexander Chernogorov, the mayor of Volgograd Roman Grebennikov, and mayor of Tula Alisa Tolkacheva were excluded from the party.

=== Mass departures from the party ===
In 2015, almost a hundred people in Kopeysk left United Russia. All employees who left the party worked at three Kopeysk enterprises: Gorvodokanal CJSC, Kopeysk Treatment Plant LLC, and Kopeysk Water Supply Networks LLC. The employees of these enterprises have not been paid salaries for a long time since the organizations do not have the funds for this. Employees blamed the head of Kopeysk, Vyacheslav Istomin, for the lack of money. According to the employees of the enterprises, their complaints about the situation were ignored. This prompted them to write a statement about leaving the party.

In 2021, in the Altai Krai village of Stepnoye, more than 120 employees of the Kuchuksulfat plant simultaneously left the United Russia party. According to these employees, because of the current situation with the plant, they are worried about the possible change of the owner of the enterprise and afraid of a raider seizure of the enterprise, and they do not see any actions from the party to help resolve the issue.

== Sanctions ==
On 16 December 2022, due to Russia's invasion of Ukraine, United Russia was included in the EU sanctions list. According to the European Union, the party supported Russia's aggressive war against Ukraine and the annexation of Ukrainian territories; thus, the party is responsible for supporting actions that undermine or threaten Ukraine's territorial integrity and independence. All party assets in the European Union are to be frozen, and any member of these parties are to be banned from entering the EU. On 24 February 2023, United Russia was included in the sanctions list of Canada.

== Leading members ==
Notable members of the party may be found in category:United Russia politicians.

- Vladimir Putin – President of Russia and former chairman of the party
- Boris Gryzlov – former Interior Minister and Chairman of the Supreme Council of the United Russia and former leader of the party
- Vyacheslav Volodin – current Chairman of the State Duma
- Valentina Matviyenko – current Chairwoman of the Federation Council
- Sergei Shoigu – former Defence Minister, former Emergency Minister, former leader of Unity party and former leader of the party
- Mintimer Shaymiev – President of Tatarstan until 2010
- Vladislav Surkov – former First Deputy Chief of Staff of the President
- Alexander Zhukov – First Vice Chairman of the State Duma and former Deputy Prime Minister
- Dmitry Medvedev – current chairman of the party, former Prime Minister of Russia, former President of Russia and the leader of the party's Federal list to the Duma (since 24 September 2011)
- Denis Pushilin and Leonid Pasechnik – leaders of the self-proclaimed Donetsk People's Republic and Luhansk People's Republic
- Ruslan Edelgeriev – Chairman of the Government of the Chechen Republic from 24 May 2012 to 25 June 2018.

== See also ==
- Belaya Rus
- For United Ukraine, a political alliance created two weeks later in Ukraine and led by the Party of Regions
- Russian Unity
- Serbian Progressive Party
- Unity Party (South Ossetia)
