= 2026 Penza Oblast gubernatorial election =

Regional legislative election in Russia

- 18–20 September 2026
- Turnout: 60.14% ▲3.18 pp
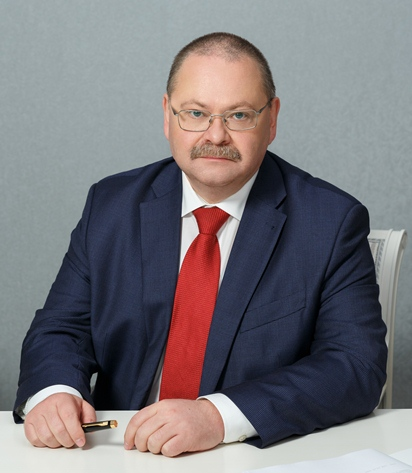
		CPRF
Candidate	Oleg Melnichenko	Oleg Shalyapin
Party	United Russia	CPRF
Popular vote	419,128	77,489
Percentage	70.80%	13.09%
	LDPR	SR
Candidate	Pavel Kulikov	Mikhail Lisin
Party	LDPR	A Just Russia
Popular vote	40,023	30,873
Percentage	6.76%	5.22%
Governor before election
Oleg Melnichenko
United Russia
Governor-elect
Oleg Melnichenko
United Russia
Senator before election
Nikolay Kondratyuk
Independent
Senator after election
Nikolay Kondratyuk
Independent

The 2026 Penza Oblast gubernatorial election took place on 18–20 September 2026, on common election day, to elect the Governor of Penza Oblast, coinciding with the 2026 Russian legislative election. Incumbent Governor Oleg Melnichenko was re-elected for a second term in office.

== Background ==
Then-Governor of Penza Oblast Ivan Belozertsev was arrested in March 2021, six months after winning re-election for a second full term with 78.72% of the vote, for taking a 31 million rubles bribe from former Senator Boris Shpigel. President of Russia Vladimir Putin sacked Belozertsev for the "loss of trust" and appointed Senator Oleg Melnichenko as acting Governor of Penza Oblast. Melnichenko easily won an election for a full term in September 2021 with 72.38% of the vote. In January 2024 former governor Belozertsev was found guilty of taking bribes and illegal possession of weapons and was sentenced to 12 years in prison.

Melnichenko is a well-known politician in Penza Oblast who previously held high-ranking positions in the regional government and Volga Federal District apparatus. However, his gubernatorial term was largely unremarkable with Melnichenko focusing on transportation and utilities infrastructure refurbishment, increased investments into the social sphere and anticorruption investigations. In preparation for a new term governor Melnichenko made minor adjustments in his cabinet in 2025.

== Candidates ==
In Penza Oblast candidates for governor of Penza Oblast can be nominated only by registered political parties. A candidate for Governor of Penza Oblast should be a Russian citizen and at least 30 years old. Candidates for Governor of Penza Oblast should not have a foreign citizenship or residence permit. Each candidate in order to be registered is required to collect at least 8% of the signatures of municipal deputies and heads of municipalities. Also gubernatorial candidates present 3 candidacies to the Federation Council and election winner later appoints one of the presented candidates.

=== Declared ===
Candidate name, political party		Occupation	Status	Ref.
Pavel Kulikov; Liberal Democratic Party		Deputy Chairman of the Legislative Assembly of Penza Oblast (2022–present)	Registered	
Mikhail Lisin; A Just Russia		Member of Penza City Duma (2024–present); Law firm director	Registered	
Oleg Melnichenko; United Russia	Oleg Melnichenko	Incumbent Governor of Penza Oblast (2021–present)	Registered	
Oleg Shalyapin; Communist Party		Deputy Chairman of the Penza City Duma (2019–present); Member of the City Duma (2014–present); 2020 and 2021 gubernatorial candidate	Registered	
Viktor Yeroshenko; Party of Pensioners		Rector of Institute of Regional Development of Penza Oblast (2025–present)	Registered	

=== Candidates for Federation Council ===
Gubernatorial candidate, political party	Candidates for Federation Council	Status
Pavel Kulikov; Liberal Democratic Party	* Anna Mikhalishcheva, aide to State Duma member Vladimir Koshelev * Aleksey Molebnov, document specialist, community activist * Aleksandr Vasilyev, Member of Penza City Duma (2024–present)	Registered
Mikhail Lisin; A Just Russia	* Igor Dmitriyevsky, financial specialist * Marina Rodina, aide to Penza City Duma member * Daniil Yunin, community activist	Registered
Oleg Melnichenko; United Russia	* Aleksandr Gulyakov, Member of Legislative Assembly of Penza Oblast (2007–present), president of Penza State University (2026–present) * Andrey Kibitkin, oblast clinical hospital chief doctor * Nikolay Kondratyuk, incumbent Senator (2021–present)	Registered
Oleg Shalyapin; Communist Party	* Yury Lyzhin, former Member of State Duma (1996–1999), gas energy executive * Oksana Milayeva, Deputy Minister of Education of Penza Oblast (2021–present) * Vladimir Smirnov, Member of Penza City Duma (2019–present), lending businessman	Registered
Viktor Yeroshenko; Party of Pensioners	* Denis Averyanov, HR specialist * Kirill Chernov, media specialist * Sergey Shurygin, custodian	Registered

== Results ==
Summary of the 18–20 September 2026 Penza Oblast gubernatorial election results
Candidate	Party	Votes	%
Oleg Melnichenko (incumbent)	United Russia	419,128	70.80
Oleg Shalyapin	Communist Party	77,489	13.09
Pavel Kulikov	Liberal Democratic Party	40,023	6.76
Mikhail Lisin	A Just Russia	30,873	5.22
Viktor Yeroshenko	Party of Pensioners	18,145	3.07
Valid votes		585,658	98.93
Blank ballots		6,309	1.07
Total		591,967	100.00
Turnout		591,967	60.14
Registered voters		984,337	100.00

Governor Melnichenko re-appointed incumbent Senator Nikolay Kondratyuk (Independent) to the Federation Council.

== See also ==
- 2026 Russian regional elections
