= 2022 Penza Oblast Legislative Assembly election =

- 9–11 September 2022
- Turnout: 50.95%
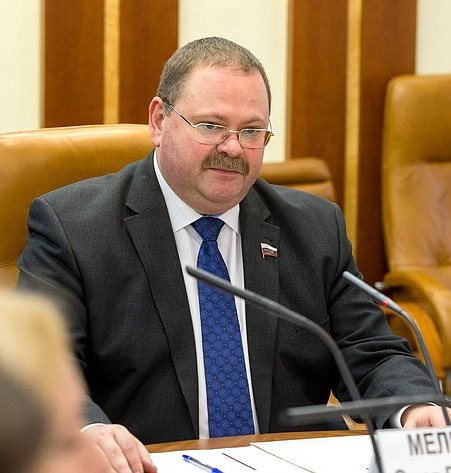

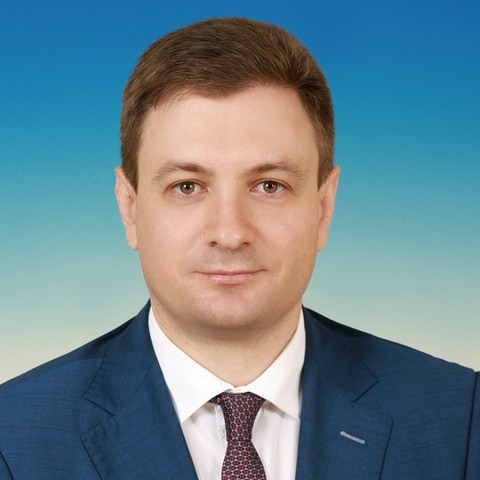
	Majority party	Minority party	Third party
			LDPR
Candidate	Oleg Melnichenko	Georgy Kamnev	Pavel Kulikov
Leader	Dmitry Medvedev	Gennady Zyuganov	Leonid Slutsky
Party	United Russia	CPRF	LDPR
Last election	32 seats, 68.99%	2 seats, 13.14%	1 seat, 7.01%
Seats won	32	2	2
Seat change	0	0	▲1
Popular vote	392,264	44,666	29,289
Percentage	74.91%	8.53%	5.59%
Swing	▲5.92%	▼4.61%	▼1.42%
	Fourth party	Fifth party	Sixth party
	RPPSS	SR-ZP	NL
Candidate	Pyotr Chugay	Aleksey Shpagin	Aleksey Blyudin
Leader	Vladimir Burakov	Sergey Mironov	Aleksey Nechayev
Party	Party of Pensioners	SR-ZP	New People
Last election	Did not participate	1 seat, 5.46%	Did not exist
Seats won	0	0	0
Seat change	Did not participate	▼1	Did not exist
Popular vote	18,379	17,268	15,078
Percentage	3.51%	3.30%	2.88%
Swing	Did not participate	▼2.16%	Did not exist

The 2022 Legislative Assembly of Penza Oblast election took place on 9–11 September 2022, on common election day. All 36 seats in the Legislative Assembly were up for reelection.

== Electoral system ==
Under current election laws, the Legislative Assembly is elected for a term of five years, with parallel voting. 18 seats are elected by party-list proportional representation with a 5% electoral threshold, with the other half elected in 18 single-member constituencies by first-past-the-post voting. Seats in the proportional part are allocated using the Imperiali quota, modified to ensure that every party list, which passes the threshold, receives at least one mandate ("Tyumen method").

== Candidates ==
=== Party lists ===
To register regional lists of candidates, parties need to collect 0.5% of signatures of all registered voters in Penza Oblast.

The following parties were relieved from the necessity to collect signatures:

- United Russia
- Communist Party of the Russian Federation
- A Just Russia — Patriots — For Truth
- Liberal Democratic Party of Russia
- New People
- Russian Party of Pensioners for Social Justice

No.	Party	Oblast-wide list	Candidates	Territorial groups	Status
1	A Just Russia — For Truth	Aleksey Shpagin	40	18	Registered
2	Liberal Democratic Party	Pavel Kulikov • Aleksandr Vasilyev	38	18	Registered
3	Party of Pensioners	Pyotr Chugay • Gennady Belorybkin • Anatoly Tsykalov	38	12	Registered
4	Communist Party	Georgy Kamnev • Dmitry Filyayev • Anton Stolyarov • Vasily Chirkov • Aleksey Petrov	52	18	Registered
5	New People	Aleksey Blyudin • Dmitry Iskorkin • Dmitry Lvov	41	13	Registered
6	United Russia	Oleg Melnichenko • Yulia Lazutkina • Valery Lidin • Vadim Supikov • Sergey Yegorov	110	18	Registered

New People and RPPSS will take part in Penza Oblast legislative election for the first time, while several parties, who participated in the 2017 election, are absent from the ballot: The Greens, Party for Fairness!, Rodina and Party of Social Protection did not file. Party of Pensioners of Russia and Patriots of Russia had been dissolved prior.

=== Single-mandate constituencies ===
18 single-mandate constituencies were formed in Penza Oblast with Penza divided between eight constituencies, Penzensky District, Tamalinsky District and Kuznetsk — each between two, while other administrative divisions were left intact.

To register, candidates in single-mandate constituencies need to collect 3% of signatures of registered voters in the constituency.

Number of candidates in single-mandate constituencies
Party	Candidates	
Party	Nominated	Registered
United Russia	18	17
Communist Party	18	18
Liberal Democratic Party	18	18
A Just Russia — For Truth	17	16
New People	11	9
Party of Pensioners	12	11
Independent	4	0
Total	98	89

== Results ==
Summary of the 9–11 September 2022 Legislative Assembly of Penza Oblast election results
Party	Party list					Constituency		Total	
Party	Votes	%	±pp	Seats	+/–	Seats	+/–	Seats	+/–
United Russia	392,264	74.91	▲5.92%	15	▲1	17	▼1	32	0
Communist Party	44,666	8.53	▼4.61%	2	0	0	Steady	2	0
Liberal Democratic Party	29,289	5.59	▼1.42%	1	0	1	▲1	2	▲1
Party of Pensioners	18,379	3.51	New	0	New	0	New	0	New
A Just Russia — For Truth	17,268	3.30	▼2.16%	0	▼1	0	Steady	0	▼1
New People	15,078	2.88	New	0	New	0	New	0	New
Invalid ballots	6.675	1.27	▼0.30%	—	—	—	—	—	—
Total	523,621	100.00	—	18	Steady	18	Steady	36	Steady
Turnout	523,621	50.95	▼0.01%	—	—	—	—	—	—
Registered voters	1,027,701	100.00	—	—	—	—	—	—	—

Summary of the 9–11 September 2022 Legislative Assembly of Penza Oblast election results by constituency
No.	Candidate	Party	Votes	%
1	Vadim Supikov (incumbent)	United Russia	17,245	75.54%
1	Sergey Lukichev	Communist Party	1,690	7.40%
1	Polina Kuznetsova	New People	1,190	5.21%
1	Aleksandr Trusov	Liberal Democratic Party	993	4.35%
1	Valentin Zavertyayev	Party of Pensioners	721	3.16%
1	Ilya Salomatin	A Just Russia — For Truth	622	2.72%
1	Total		22,830	100%
1	Source:			
2	Olga Chistyakova (incumbent)	United Russia	16,456	67.83%
2	Yekaterina Kalinina	Communist Party	2,698	11.12%
2	Sergey Guryanov	Liberal Democratic Party	1,510	6.22%
2	Aleksey Parshikov	New People	1,303	5.37%
2	Sergey Ivanov	Party of Pensioners	961	3.96%
2	Irina Pustova	A Just Russia — For Truth	871	3.59%
2	Total		24,259	100%
2	Source:			
3	Sergey Rybalkin	United Russia	11,181	65.95%
3	Yekaterina Filatova	Communist Party	2,016	11.89%
3	Yulia Abramova	New People	1,031	6.08%
3	Pavel Kulikov	Liberal Democratic Party	980	5.78%
3	Valery Arkhipkin	Party of Pensioners	711	4.19%
3	Sergey Davydkin	A Just Russia — For Truth	621	3.66%
3	Total		16,955	100%
3	Source:			
4	Aleksandr Gulyakov (incumbent)	United Russia	7,909	56.91%
4	Dim Salikhov	Communist Party	1,655	11.91%
4	Aleksey Berlizov	New People	1,506	10.84%
4	Andrey Masenkin	Liberal Democratic Party	1,396	10.04%
4	Mikhail Irikov	A Just Russia — For Truth	972	6.99%
4	Total		13,898	100%
4	Source:			
5	Oleg Kochetkov (incumbent)	United Russia	9,653	67.61%
5	Oleg Dzyadevich	Communist Party	1,479	10.36%
5	Vladimir Bystryakov	Liberal Democratic Party	1,115	7.81%
5	Aleksandr Stryapikhin	Party of Pensioners	842	5.90%
5	Anton Yurchenko	A Just Russia — For Truth	809	5.67%
5	Total		14,277	100%
5	Source:			
6	Fyodor Toshchev (incumbent)	United Russia	8,748	67.26%
6	Aleksey Petrov	Communist Party	1,588	12.21%
6	Yury Ilyin	Party of Pensioners	985	7.57%
6	Aleksey Molebnov	Liberal Democratic Party	775	5.96%
6	Rafik Kadirov	A Just Russia — For Truth	556	4.27%
6	Total		13,006	100%
6	Source:			
7	Nikolay Lukyanov (incumbent)	United Russia	10,663	58.95%
7	Oleg Shalyapin	Communist Party	2,630	14.54%
7	Mikhail Sharonov	New People	1,579	8.73%
7	Vyacheslav Kulikov	Liberal Democratic Party	1,431	7.91%
7	Marta Dybnova	A Just Russia — For Truth	1,399	7.73%
7	Total		18,089	100%
7	Source:			
8	Sergey Baydarov	United Russia	10,472	60.23%
8	Vasily Chirkov	Communist Party	3,384	19.46%
8	Denis Kravchuk	Liberal Democratic Party	1,488	8.56%
8	Artyom Savelyev	A Just Russia — For Truth	1,391	8.00%
8	Total		17,387	100%
8	Source:			
9	Vadim Kalinin	United Russia	34,208	79.69%
9	Oleg Skachkov	Communist Party	3,642	8.48%
9	Vladimir Prokin	Liberal Democratic Party	2,044	4.76%
9	Aleksandr Atyushov	A Just Russia — For Truth	1,307	3.04%
9	Yevgenia Volokushina	New People	1,287	3.00%
9	Total		42,928	100%
9	Source:			
10	Boris Kulagin (incumbent)	United Russia	31,716	82.26%
10	Aleksandr Knyazkov	Communist Party	2,420	6.28%
10	Aleksandr Yurmashev	Liberal Democratic Party	2,044	5.30%
10	Olga Zotova	New People	1,928	5.00%
10	Total		38,554	100%
10	Source:			
11	Lyudmila Glukhova (incumbent)	United Russia	22,972	73.81%
11	Albina Kudryakova	Communist Party	3,544	11.39%
11	Igor Sarantsev	Liberal Democratic Party	2,180	7.00%
11	Lidia Khudova	Party of Pensioners	1,970	6.33%
11	Total		31,125	100%
11	Source:			
12	Sergey Vanyushin	United Russia	28,251	84.30%
12	Yelena Vasyagina	Communist Party	2,215	6.61%
12	Yelena Proskurdina	Party of Pensioners	1,014	3.03%
12	Artyom Kiselev	Liberal Democratic Party	965	2.88%
12	Mikhail Baklushin	A Just Russia — For Truth	753	2.25%
12	Total		33,514	100%
12	Source:			
13	Vladimir Vdonin (incumbent)	United Russia	29,251	81.99%
13	Vadim Serdovintsev	Liberal Democratic Party	1,862	5.17%
13	Andrey Zhdannikov	Communist Party	1,582	4.39%
13	Anatoly Buyanin	New People	1,181	3.28%
13	Tatyana Yudina	A Just Russia — For Truth	974	2.71%
13	Nina Inkina	Party of Pensioners	604	1.68%
13	Total		36,005	100%
13	Source:			
14	Dmitry Petrov (incumbent)	United Russia	27,803	72.50%
14	Pavel Druzhinin	Communist Party	3,440	8.97%
14	Igor Isayev	Liberal Democratic Party	1,918	5.00%
14	Aleksey Blyudin	New People	1,821	4.75%
14	Pavel Medvedev	A Just Russia — For Truth	1,593	4.15%
14	Aleksey Shender	Party of Pensioners	1,238	3.23%
14	Total		38,349	100%
14	Source:			
15	Igor Borisov (incumbent)	United Russia	39,720	89.82%
15	Vladimir Marshev	Communist Party	1,777	4.02%
15	Ryashid Kerimov	A Just Russia — For Truth	1,291	2.92%
15	Aleksey Sapegin	Liberal Democratic Party	1,097	2.48%
15	Total		44,223	100%
15	Source:			
16	Yury Starkin (incumbent)	United Russia	29,988	80.19%
16	Valentina Shvedova	Communist Party	2,287	6.12%
16	Denis Kostyuchenko	A Just Russia — For Truth	2,147	5.74%
16	Lyudmila Murina	Liberal Democratic Party	1,563	4.18%
16	Tatyana Zavyalova	Party of Pensioners	1,041	2.78%
16	Total		37,394	100%
16	Source:			
17	Ildar Akchurin (incumbent)	United Russia	31,280	85.53%
17	Andrey Burtsev	Communist Party	1,940	5.30%
17	Nikolay Kezhayev	Liberal Democratic Party	1,084	2.96%
17	Rimma Volodina	Party of Pensioners	996	2.72%
17	Ryashit Gafurov	A Just Russia — For Truth	649	1.77%
17	Dmitry Iskorkin	New People	431	1.18%
17	Total		36,571	100%
17	Source:			
18	Aleksandr Vasilyev	Liberal Democratic Party	17,273	63.47%
18	Yekaterina Murunova	Communist Party	4,974	18.28%
18	Aleksey Volkov	A Just Russia — For Truth	4,236	15.57%
18	Total		27,214	100%
18	Source:			

Incumbent Senator Yulia Lazutkina (United Russia) was re-appointed to the Federation Council.

== See also ==
- 2022 Russian regional elections
