= Governor of Penza Oblast =

Highest-ranking official in Penza Oblast, Russia

- Coat of arms of Penza Oblast

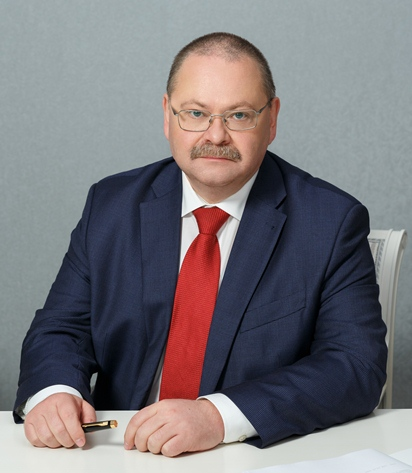
- Incumbent; Oleg Melnichenko since 28 September 2021
- Seat: Penza
- Appointer: by direct election
- Term length: 5 years
- Formation: 1991
- First holder: Aleksandr Kondratyev
- Website: en.pnzreg.ru

Governor of Penza Oblast (Russian: Губернатор Пензенской области) is the head of the executive branch of the government of Penza Oblast, a federal subject (an oblast) of Russia.

== Election ==
The procedure for the election and inauguration of the governor of Penza is determined by the federal law, the Charter of the Penza Region and the law on the election of a governor.

For the first time, the elections of the governor (head of administration) of the Penza region were held in April 1993, then were held in April 1998, and in April 2002. In December 2004, direct election of governors was abolished, instead governors were appointed by the president through the regional parliament. Thus, in May 2005 and April 2010, the Governor of the Penza Region was elected by the President of Russia and approved in the position by the Legislative Assembly. In 2012, direct elections of the heads of regions were returned, but with the condition that candidates pass through the municipal filter. According to these rules, the elections of the governor of the Penza region were held in September 2015 and September 2020.

== List ==
No.	Image	Governor	Tenure	Time in office	Party	Election
1		Aleksandr Kondratyev (1947–2017)	24 October 1991 – 12 April 1993 (lost election)	1 year, 170 days	Independent	Appointed
2		Anatoly Kovlyagin (1938–2009)	12 April 1993 – 18 April 1998 (lost re-election)	5 years, 6 days	Independent	1993
3		Vasily Bochkaryov (1949–2016)	18 April 1998 – 25 May 2015 (term end)	17 years, 37 days	Independent → United Russia	1998; 2002; 2005 (Note: Appointed by the president of Russia with the consent of the Legislative Assembly of Penza Oblast.); 2010
–		Ivan Belozertsev (born 1958)	25 May 2015 – 13 September 2015	5 years, 302 days	United Russia	Acting
4		Ivan Belozertsev (born 1958)	13 September 2015 – 23 March 2021 (removed)	5 years, 302 days	United Russia	2015; 2020
–		Nikolay Simonov (born 1956)	23 March 2021 – 26 March 2021 (successor appointed)	3 days	United Russia	Acting as premier
–		Oleg Melnichenko (born 1973)	26 March 2021 – 28 September 2021	5 years, 180 days	United Russia	Acting
5		Oleg Melnichenko (born 1973)	28 September 2021 – present	5 years, 180 days	United Russia	2021; 2026
