= 2021 Penza Oblast gubernatorial election =

- 17–19 September 2021
- Turnout: 56.96%
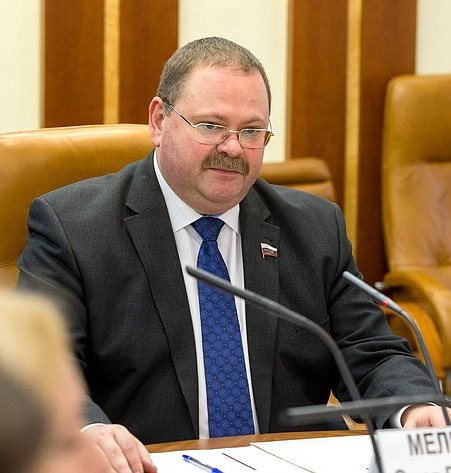
		CPRF
Candidate	Oleg Melnichenko	Oleg Shalyapin
Party	United Russia	CPRF
Popular vote	428,868	73,153
Percentage	72.38%	12.35%
	SR-ZP	LDPR
Candidate	Aleksey Shpagin	Aleksandr Vasilyev
Party	SR-ZP	LDPR
Popular vote	33,714	33,593
Percentage	5.69%	5.67%
Governor before election
Oleg Melnichenko
United Russia
Elected Governor
Oleg Melnichenko
United Russia

The 2021 Penza Oblast gubernatorial election took place on 17–19 September 2021, on common election day, coinciding with election to the State Duma. Acting Governor Oleg Melnichenko was elected for his first term.

== Background ==
Governor Ivan Belozertsev in 2020 won re-election to his second term with 78.72% of the vote. On 21 March 2021, less than a year after the election, Governor Belozertsev was arrested, he was charged with accepting a ₽31 million ($0.4 million) bribe from former Senator from Penza Oblast (2003-2013) and pharmaceutical executive Boris Shpigel. Simultaneously, Investigative Committee announced that they had found facts of electoral fraud during 2020 gubernatorial election. On 26 March President Vladimir Putin fired Belozertsev for the "loss of trust" and appointed Senator Oleg Melnichenko as acting Governor of Penza Oblast. Melnichenko previously served in the Government of Penza Oblast in 2007-2009 as Minister of Education and Science, Vice Governor and Deputy Head of Government, and as Deputy Presidential Envoy to the Volga Federal District (2013-2017).

== Candidates ==
Only political parties can nominate candidates for gubernatorial election in Penza Oblast, self-nomination is not possible. However, candidate is not obliged to be a member of the nominating party. Candidate for Governor of Penza Oblast should be a Russian citizen and at least 30 years old. Candidates for Governor should not have a foreign citizenship or residence permit. Each candidate in order to be registered is required to collect at least 253 signatures of members and heads of municipalities. Also gubernatorial candidates present 3 candidacies to the Federation Council and election winner later appoints one of the presented candidates.

=== Registered candidates ===
- Pyotr Chugay (RPPSS), Member of Penza City Duma, 2020 gubernatorial candidate
- Oleg Melnichenko (United Russia), acting Governor of Penza Oblast, former Senator of the Federation Council (2017–2021)
- Oleg Shalyapin (CPRF), Deputy Head of Penza, Member of Penza City Duma, 2020 gubernatorial candidate
- Aleksey Shpagin (SR-ZP), general director of LLP "Gelios"
- Aleksandr Vasilyev (LDPR), Member of the Legislative Assembly of Penza Oblast, 2020 gubernatorial candidate

=== Withdrawn candidates ===
- Anna Ochkina (SR-ZP), professor at Penza State University, 2020 gubernatorial candidate (withdrew due to affiliation with "foreign agent" organisation)

=== Lost nomination ===
- Aleksandr Lomovtsev (United Russia), Member of the Legislative Assembly of Penza Oblast

=== Candidates for the Federation Council ===
- Pyotr Chugay (RPPSS):
  - Aleksandr Lomakin, pensioner
  - Aleksey Panfilov, chairman of regional Council of GSFG Veterans
  - Lidiya Panfilova, chairwoman of the RPPSS Penza city office
- Oleg Melnichenko (United Russia):
  - Aleksandr Gulyakov, rector of Penza State University
  - Marat Lebedev, oral surgeon at Penza Oblast Clinical Hospital
  - Maria Lvova-Belova, incumbent Senator of the Federation Council
- Oleg Shalyapin (CPRF):
  - Dmitry Filyaev, director of Penza Middle School №58
  - Georgy Kamnev, member of the Legislative Assembly of Penza Oblast, member of the Presidium of the CPRF Central Committee
  - Oksana Milayeva, member of Penza City Duma, professor of philosophy at Penza State University
- Aleksey Shpagin (SR-ZP):
  - Mikhail Irikov, chairman of the board of consumer society "Kirova 55"
  - Lyudmila Kharitonova, farmer
  - Gennady Lukyanchikov, wireman
- Aleksandr Vasilyev (LDPR):
  - Vladimir Bystryakov, coordinator of the LPDR Penza city office
  - Pavel Kulikov, Deputy Head of Penza, member of Penza City Duma, coordinator of the LDPR Penza regional office
  - Vadim Serdovintsev, member of Nizhny Lomov Assembly of Representatives

== Results ==
Summary of the 17-19 September 2021 Penza Oblast gubernatorial election results
Candidate	Party	Votes	%
Oleg Melnichenko (incumbent)	United Russia	428,868	72.38
Oleg Shalyapin	Communist Party	73,153	12.35
Aleksey Shpagin	A Just Russia — For Truth	33,714	5.69
Aleksandr Vasilyev	Liberal Democratic Party	33,593	5.67
Pyotr Chugay	Party of Pensioners	13,650	2.30
Valid votes		582,978	98.39
Blank ballots		9,540	1.61
Total		592,518	100.00
Turnout		592,518	56.96
Registered voters		1,040,202	100.00

Incumbent Senator Maria Lvova-Belova (United Russia) was re-appointed to the Federation Council.
