= 2023 Zabaykalsky Krai Legislative Assembly election =

Election in Russia

← 2018	8–10 September 2023	2028 →
- Turnout: 26.61%
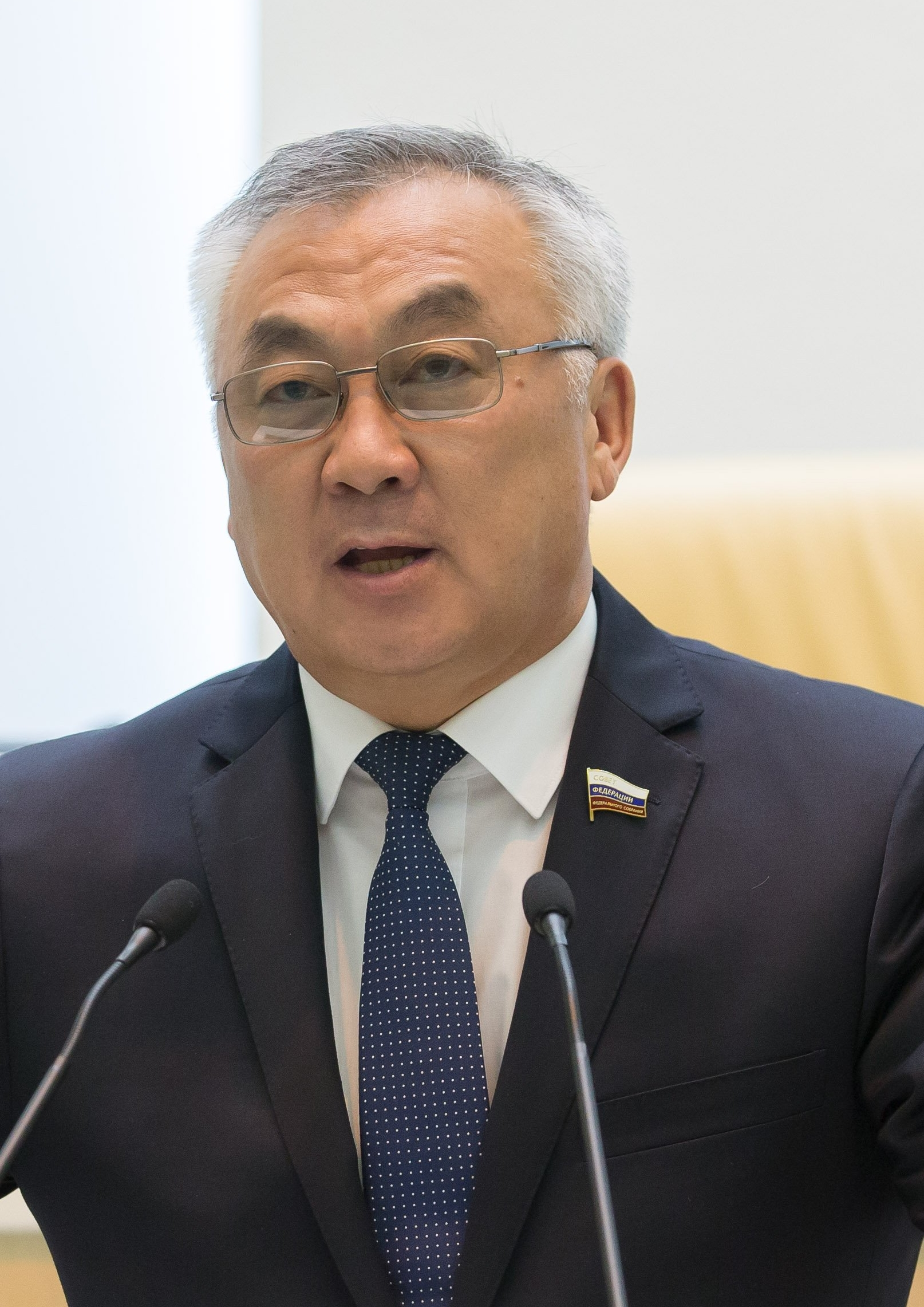

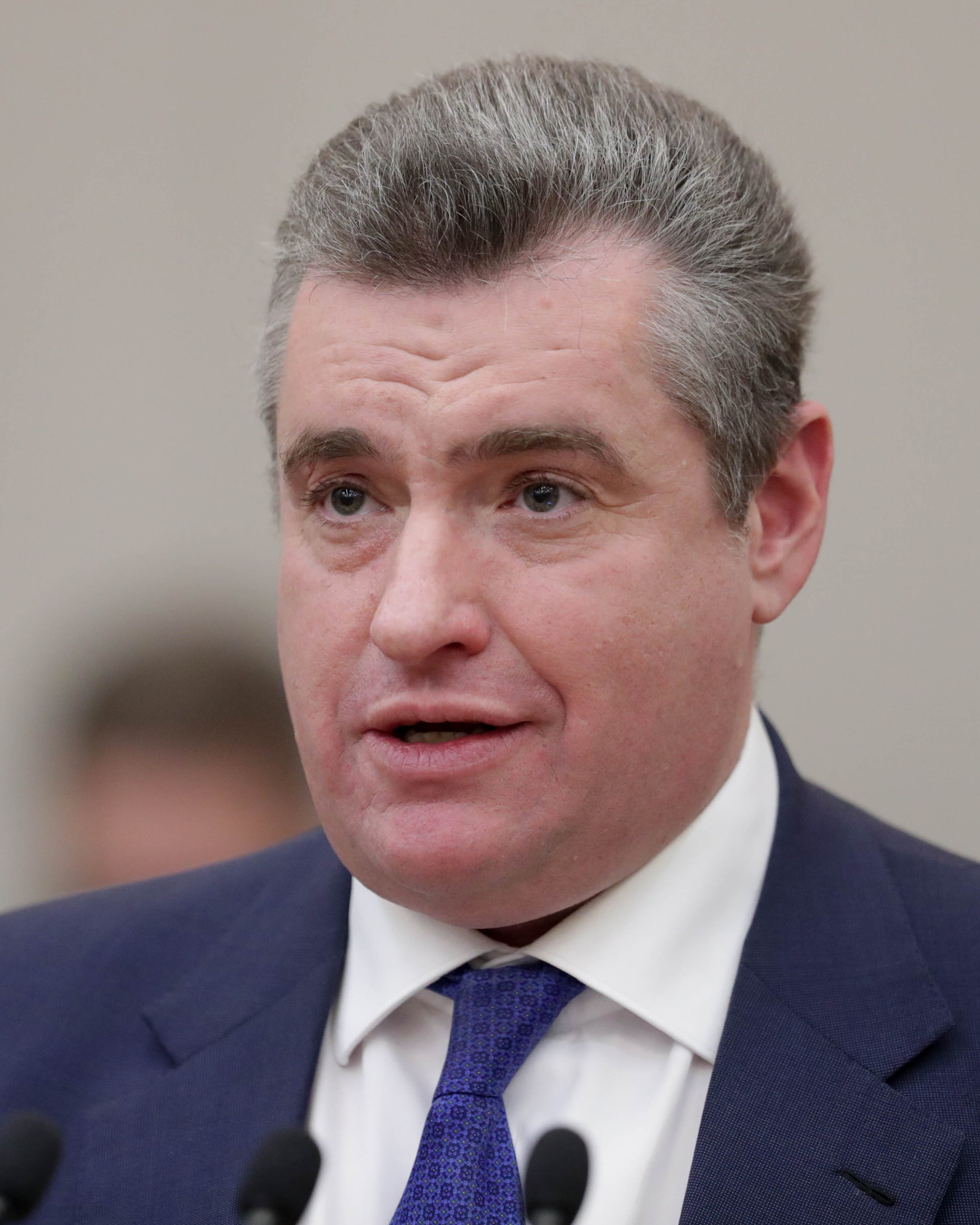

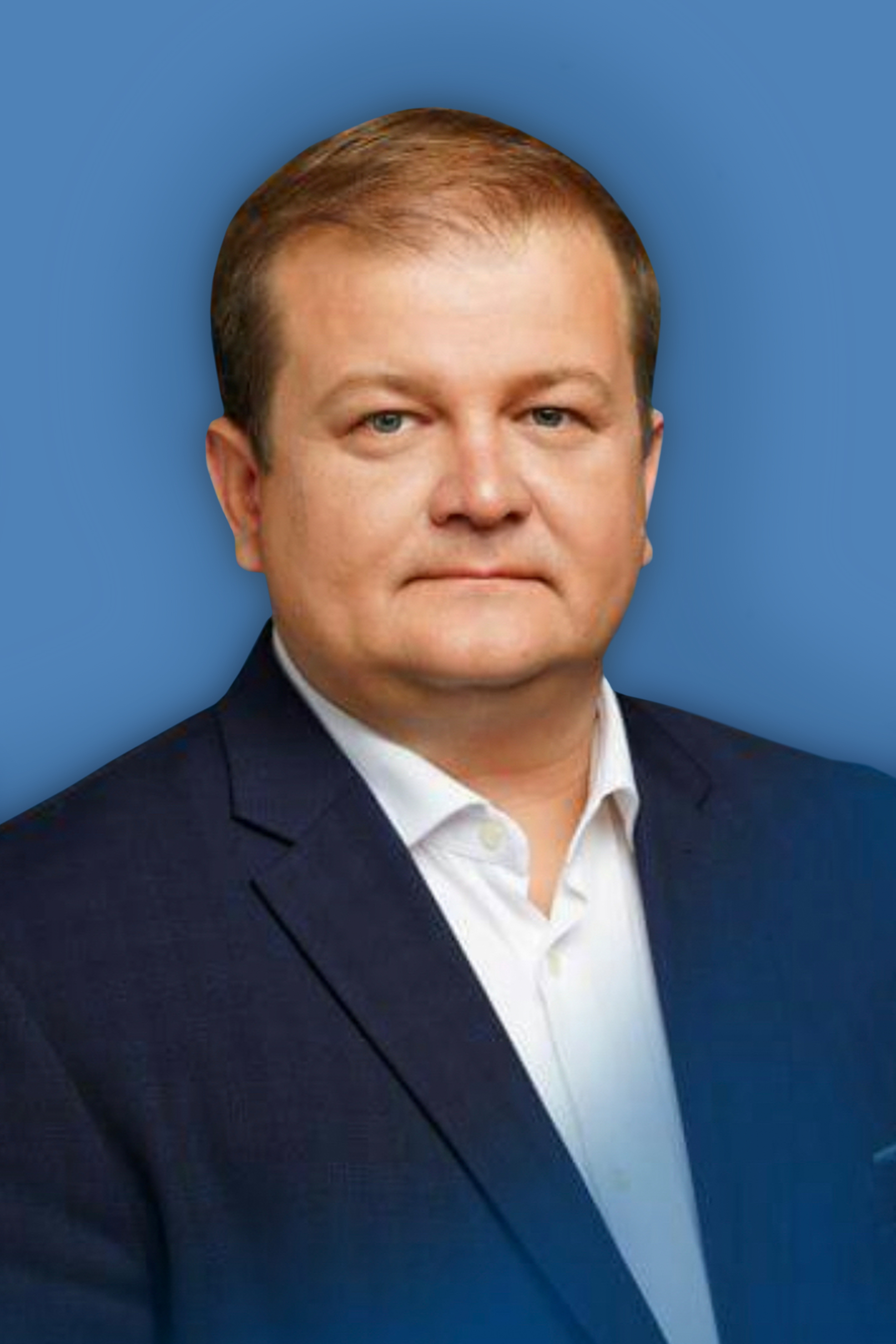
	Majority party	Minority party	Third party
			CPRF
Candidate	Bair Zhamsuyev	Leonid Slutsky	Yury Gayduk
Leader	Dmitry Medvedev	Leonid Slutsky	Gennady Zyuganov
Party	United Russia	LDPR	CPRF
Last election	21 seats, 28.30%	10 seats, 24.60%	14 seats, 24.59%
Seats won	42	4	3
Seat change	▲21	▼6	▼11
Popular vote	116,776	32,078	20,192
Percentage	56.94%	15.64%	9.85%
Swing	▲28.64%	▼8.96%	▼14.74%
	Fourth party	Fifth party	Sixth party
		NL	CPCR
Candidate	Sergey Bezdenezhnykh	Vitaly Zhukov	Vladimir Lobanov
Leader	Sergey Mironov	Aleksey Nechayev	Sergey Malinkovich
Party	SR-ZP	New People	Communists of Russia
Last election	3 seats, 8.97%	Did not exist	Did not participate
Seats won	1	0	0
Seat change	▼2	Did not exist	Did not participate
Popular vote	12,901	8,449	4,155
Percentage	6.29%	4.12%	2.03%
Swing	▼2.68%	Did not exist	Did not participate

The 2023 Legislative Assembly of Zabaykalsky Krai election took place on 8–10 September 2023, on common election day. All 50 seats in the Legislative Assembly were up for reelection.

== Electoral system ==
Under current election laws, the Legislative Assembly is elected for a term of five years, with parallel voting. 25 seats are elected by party-list proportional representation with a 5% electoral threshold, with the other half elected in 25 single-member constituencies by first-past-the-post voting. Seats in the proportional part are allocated using the Imperiali quota, modified to ensure that every party list, which passes the threshold, receives at least one mandate.

== Candidates ==
=== Party lists ===
To register regional lists of candidates, parties need to collect 0.5% of signatures of all registered voters in Zabaykalsky Krai.

The following parties were relieved from the necessity to collect signatures:

- United Russia
- Communist Party of the Russian Federation
- A Just Russia — Patriots — For Truth
- Liberal Democratic Party of Russia
- New People
- Party of Business
- Rodina

No.	Party	Krai-wide list	Candidates	Territorial groups	Status
1	United Russia	Bair Zhamsuyev • Andrey Gurulyov • Inna Shcheglova • Aleksandr Sapozhnikov • Alexander Skachkov	55	25	Registered
2	A Just Russia – For Truth	Sergey Bezdenezhnykh • Aleksandr Setov • Sergey Snetkov • Anatoly Pichugin • Olga Khomutova	50	23	Registered
3	New People	Vitaly Zhukov • Konstantin Pershikov • Valentina Dymchenko • Andrey Khustochka • Vasily Ryabkov	48	15	Registered
4	Liberal Democratic Party	Leonid Slutsky • Vasilina Kuliyeva • Viktor Yefimov • Dmitry Tyuryukhanov • Georgy Shilin	55	25	Registered
5	Communist Party	Yury Gayduk • Yelena Titova • Yulia Verkhoturova • Sergey Suturin	55	23	Registered
6	Rodina	Aleksandr Shchebenkov • Vyacheslav Tambovtsev • Anna Arkhipova • Maksim Gizaitulin	51	22	Registered
7	Communists of Russia	Vladimir Lobanov • Vadim Fomin	40	19	Registered

New People, Communists of Russia and Rodina will take part in Zabaykalsky Krai legislative election for the first time. Party of Pensioners of Russia and Patriots of Russia, who participated in the last election (Party of Pensioners even has its own faction in the Legislative Assembly), had been dissolved prior. Party of Business declined to file a party list and nominated just one candidate in a single-mandate constituency.

=== Single-mandate constituencies ===
25 single-mandate constituencies were formed in Zabaykalsky Krai. To register candidates in single-mandate constituencies need to collect 3% of signatures of registered voters in the constituency.

Number of candidates in single-mandate constituencies
Party	Candidates	
Party	Nominated	Registered
United Russia	25	25
Liberal Democratic Party	25	25
Communist Party	21	19
A Just Russia — For Truth	23	19
New People	2	2
Rodina	23	22
Party of Business	1	0
Independent	5	0
Total	125	112

== Results ==
=== Results by party lists ===
Summary of the 8–10 September 2023 Legislative Assembly of Zabaykalsky Krai election results
Party	Party list					Constituency		Total	
Party	Votes	%	±pp	Seats	+/–	Seats	+/–	Seats	+/–
United Russia	116,776	56.94	▲28.64%	17	▲9	25	▲12	42	▲21
Liberal Democratic Party	32,078	15.64	▼8.96%	4	▼3	0	▼3	4	▼6
Communist Party	20,192	9.85	▼14.74%	3	▼4	0	▼7	3	▼11
A Just Russia — For Truth	12,901	6.29	▼2.68%	1	▼1	0	▼1	1	▼2
New People	8,449	4.12	New	0	New	0	New	0	New
Communists of Russia	4,155	2.03	New	0	New	–	–	0	New
Rodina	4,129	2.01	New	0	New	0	New	0	New
Invalid ballots	6,407	3.12	▼1.00%	—	—	—	—	—	—
Total	205,087	100.00	—	25	Steady	25	Steady	50	Steady
Turnout	205,087	26.61	▲4.57%	—	—	—	—	—	—
Registered voters	770,788	100.00	—	—	—	—	—	—	—

Kon Yen Hwa (United Russia) was re-elected as Chairman of the Legislative Assembly, while incumbent Senator Sergey Mikhailov was re-appointed to the Federation Council.

=== Results in single-member constituencies ===
==== District 1 ====
Summary of the 8–10 September 2023 Legislative Assembly of Zabaykalsky Krai election in Central constituency No.1
Candidate	Party	Votes	%
Viktoria Bessonova (incumbent)	United Russia	2,382	46.44%
Sergey Dyubin	Liberal Democratic Party	889	17.33%
Bair Tsyrendorzhiyev	Communist Party	835	16.28%
Marina Sokol	A Just Russia – For Truth	513	10.00%
Aleksandr Staritsyn	Rodina	260	5.07%
Total		5,129	100%

==== District 2 ====
Summary of the 8–10 September 2023 Legislative Assembly of Zabaykalsky Krai election in Barguzinsky constituency No.2
Candidate	Party	Votes	%
Olga Serebryakova	United Russia	2,539	48.16%
Denis Nechayev	Liberal Democratic Party	1,281	24.30%
Sergey Gudz	Communist Party	835	15.84%
Anna Arkhipova	Rodina	379	7.19%
Total		5,272	100%

==== District 3 ====
Summary of the 8–10 September 2023 Legislative Assembly of Zabaykalsky Krai election in Titovsky constituency No.3
Candidate	Party	Votes	%
Kon Yen Hwa (incumbent)	United Russia	2,395	51.94%
Yevgeny Ovchinnikov	Communist Party	663	14.38%
Mikhail Nosko	Liberal Democratic Party	557	12.08%
Mikhail Druzhinin	A Just Russia – For Truth	407	8.83%
Nikolay Galkin	Rodina	359	7.79%
Total		4,611	100%

==== District 4 ====
Summary of the 8–10 September 2023 Legislative Assembly of Zabaykalsky Krai election in Oktyabrsky constituency No.4
Candidate	Party	Votes	%
Sergey Korolkov	United Russia	1,914	39.87%
Sergey Piskunov	A Just Russia – For Truth	1,200	24.99%
Vladimir Zolotarev	Liberal Democratic Party	1,134	23.62%
Natalya Zhitar	Rodina	284	5.92%
Total		4,801	100%

==== District 5 ====
Summary of the 8–10 September 2023 Legislative Assembly of Zabaykalsky Krai election in Chernovsky constituency No.5
Candidate	Party	Votes	%
Sergey Lukyanov	United Russia	2,437	48.07%
Svetlana Ilyukhina (incumbent)	Liberal Democratic Party	953	18.80%
Yulia Verkhoturova	Communist Party	507	10.00%
Vitaly Zhukov	New People	436	8.60%
Igor Naydetsky	A Just Russia – For Truth	273	5.38%
Pavel Silantyev	Rodina	136	2.68%
Total		5,070	100%

==== District 6 ====
Summary of the 8–10 September 2023 Legislative Assembly of Zabaykalsky Krai election in Kenonsky constituency No.6
Candidate	Party	Votes	%
Vladimir Ivanchenko (incumbent)	United Russia	2,731	55.59%
Roman Filipov	Liberal Democratic Party	927	18.87%
Yevgenia Pogorelova	A Just Russia – For Truth	567	11.54%
Denis Litvintsev	Rodina	377	7.67%
Total		4,913	100%

==== District 7 ====
Summary of the 8–10 September 2023 Legislative Assembly of Zabaykalsky Krai election in Kashtaksky constituency No.7
Candidate	Party	Votes	%
Denis Leskov	United Russia	2,447	37.47%
Aleksandr Shchebenkov	Rodina	1,356	20.76%
Sergey Suturin (incumbent)	Communist Party	1,093	16.74%
Kirill Korenev	Liberal Democratic Party	909	13.92%
Konstantin Pershikov	New People	396	6.06%
Total		6,531	100%

==== District 8 ====
Summary of the 8–10 September 2023 Legislative Assembly of Zabaykalsky Krai election in Gagarinsky constituency No.8
Candidate	Party	Votes	%
Aleksandr Korchagin	United Russia	5,359	58.50%
Andrey Polyansky	Liberal Democratic Party	1,317	14.38%
Aleksandr Starchenko	Communist Party	969	10.58%
Ivan Kurbetyev	A Just Russia – For Truth	612	6.68%
Viktor Sheremetyev	Rodina	525	5.73%
Total		9,160	100%

==== District 9 ====
Summary of the 8–10 September 2023 Legislative Assembly of Zabaykalsky Krai election in Petrovsky constituency No.9
Candidate	Party	Votes	%
Oleg Byankin (incumbent)	United Russia	5,137	60.58%
Maksim Pugachev	Liberal Democratic Party	1,107	13.05%
Aleksandr Mangoldt	Communist Party	981	11.57%
Vyacheslav Tambovtsev	Rodina	727	8.57%
Total		8,480	100%

==== District 10 ====
Summary of the 8–10 September 2023 Legislative Assembly of Zabaykalsky Krai election in Khiloksky constituency No.10
Candidate	Party	Votes	%
Mikhail Kalashnikov	United Russia	6,263	60.35%
Irina Pinayeva	Liberal Democratic Party	2,371	22.85%
Olesya Leskova	Rodina	1,195	11.51%
Total		10,378	100%

==== District 11 ====
Summary of the 8–10 September 2023 Legislative Assembly of Zabaykalsky Krai election in Chitinsky constituency No.11
Candidate	Party	Votes	%
Mikhail Gimayev	United Russia	3,854	47.21%
Irina Grigoryeva	Liberal Democratic Party	1,160	14.21%
Anatoly Pichugin	A Just Russia – For Truth	1,119	13.71%
Yelena Titova	Communist Party	1,018	12.47%
Yelena Zolotuyeva	Rodina	570	6.98%
Total		8,164	100%

==== District 12 ====
Summary of the 8–10 September 2023 Legislative Assembly of Zabaykalsky Krai election in Akshinsky constituency No.12
Candidate	Party	Votes	%
Yury Shnyukov	United Russia	4,516	52.10%
Sergey Stankov	Communist Party	1,503	17.34%
Yana Konopasevich	Liberal Democratic Party	830	9.58%
Yevgeny Rychkov	A Just Russia – For Truth	783	9.03%
Maksim Gizaitulin	Rodina	714	8.24%
Total		8,668	100%

==== District 13 ====
Summary of the 8–10 September 2023 Legislative Assembly of Zabaykalsky Krai election in Aginsky constituency No.13
Candidate	Party	Votes	%
Zhargal Zhapov	United Russia	10,258	72.61%
Batoshulun Baldanov	A Just Russia – For Truth	1,511	10.70%
Mikhail Kryazhev	Communist Party	1,214	8.59%
Vladimir Zakharov	Liberal Democratic Party	609	4.31%
Irina Melikhova	Rodina	262	1.85%
Total		14,127	100%

==== District 14 ====
Summary of the 8–10 September 2023 Legislative Assembly of Zabaykalsky Krai election in Mogoytuysky constituency No.14
Candidate	Party	Votes	%
Sokto Mazhiyev (incumbent)	United Russia	7,663	67.24%
Bilikto Tsybenov	Communist Party	1,378	12.09%
Aleksandr Kadin	Liberal Democratic Party	1,231	10.80%
Kristina Kozyreva	Rodina	767	6.73%
Total		11,397	100%

==== District 15 ====
Summary of the 8–10 September 2023 Legislative Assembly of Zabaykalsky Krai election in Olovyanninsky constituency No.15
Candidate	Party	Votes	%
Aleksey Saklakov (incumbent)	United Russia	3,613	44.43%
Darya Berezneva	Liberal Democratic Party	1,886	23.20%
Sergey Papenko	A Just Russia – For Truth	1,815	22.32%
Oleg Zagorodnev	Rodina	360	4.43%
Total		8,131	100%

==== District 16 ====
Summary of the 8–10 September 2023 Legislative Assembly of Zabaykalsky Krai election in Northern constituency No.16
Candidate	Party	Votes	%
Denis Kosyan	United Russia	2,842	61.81%
Sergey Antonovsky	Liberal Democratic Party	1,123	24.42%
Gennady Murashkin	A Just Russia – For Truth	488	10.61%
Total		4,598	100%

==== District 17 ====
Summary of the 8–10 September 2023 Legislative Assembly of Zabaykalsky Krai election in Karymsky constituency No.17
Candidate	Party	Votes	%
Yekaterina Fisun (incumbent)	United Russia	3,689	44.86%
Denis Kurochkin	A Just Russia – For Truth	1,306	15.88%
Pavel Zabelin	Liberal Democratic Party	1,240	15.08%
Vladimir Ivanov	Communist Party	1,150	13.98%
Yevgeny Fedorov	Rodina	509	6.19%
Total		8,224	100%

==== District 18 ====
Summary of the 8–10 September 2023 Legislative Assembly of Zabaykalsky Krai election in Shilkinsky constituency No.18
Candidate	Party	Votes	%
Aleksey Butylsky (incumbent)	United Russia	3,383	43.71%
Aleksandr Domchenko	Communist Party	1,342	17.34%
Yury Ivanov	Liberal Democratic Party	1,275	16.47%
Valery Turayev	A Just Russia – For Truth	995	12.86%
Roman Alyoshkin	Rodina	417	5.39%
Total		7,739	100%

==== District 19 ====
Summary of the 8–10 September 2023 Legislative Assembly of Zabaykalsky Krai election in Borzinsky constituency No.19
Candidate	Party	Votes	%
Pyotr Gabidulin	United Russia	3,153	47.03%
Aleksandr Alekseyenko	Communist Party	1,303	19.44%
Zorikto Tsybikzhapov	Liberal Democratic Party	991	14.78%
Olga Beloshitskaya	Rodina	578	8.62%
Total		6,704	100%

==== District 20 ====
Summary of the 8–10 September 2023 Legislative Assembly of Zabaykalsky Krai election in Nerchinsky constituency No.20
Candidate	Party	Votes	%
Viktor Nadelyayev	United Russia	3,432	40.62%
Sergey Fyodorov	Liberal Democratic Party	2,735	32.37%
Irina Perelomova	Communist Party	971	11.49%
Vadim Kuznetsov	A Just Russia – For Truth	880	10.42%
Viktor Mikhnovets	Rodina	199	2.36%
Total		8,449	100%

==== District 21 ====
Summary of the 8–10 September 2023 Legislative Assembly of Zabaykalsky Krai election in Gazimursky constituency No.21
Candidate	Party	Votes	%
Dmitry Vinogradsky	United Russia	5,011	57.20%
Dmitry Belous	Liberal Democratic Party	1,239	14.14%
Pavel Lebedev	Communist Party	999	11.40%
Olga Khomutova	A Just Russia – For Truth	581	6.63%
Ivan Kurtov	Rodina	562	6.41%
Total		8,761	100%

==== District 22 ====
Summary of the 8–10 September 2023 Legislative Assembly of Zabaykalsky Krai election in Krasnokamensky constituency No.22
Candidate	Party	Votes	%
Ivan Kiselev	United Russia	4,600	73.93%
Yelena Tyukalova	Communist Party	456	7.33%
Matvey Suturin	Liberal Democratic Party	423	6.80%
Yevgenia Shulgina	A Just Russia – For Truth	392	6.30%
Vladimir Motin	Rodina	139	2.23%
Total		6,222	100%

==== District 23 ====
Summary of the 8–10 September 2023 Legislative Assembly of Zabaykalsky Krai election in Zabaykalsky constituency No.23
Candidate	Party	Votes	%
Andrey Beketov	United Russia	3,453	52.85%
Aleksandr Kunitsyn	Liberal Democratic Party	1,680	25.71%
Marina Pichuyeva	A Just Russia – For Truth	1,106	16.93%
Total		6,534	100%

==== District 24 ====
Summary of the 8–10 September 2023 Legislative Assembly of Zabaykalsky Krai election in Priargunsky constituency No.24
Candidate	Party	Votes	%
Mikhail Yakimov (incumbent)	United Russia	4,139	46.24%
Natalya Grebneva	Communist Party	1,650	18.43%
Aleksey Turanov	Liberal Democratic Party	1,451	16.21%
Artyom Bichakhchyan	A Just Russia – For Truth	1,298	14.50%
Total		8,951	100%

==== District 25 ====
Summary of the 8–10 September 2023 Legislative Assembly of Zabaykalsky Krai election in Chernyshevsky constituency No.25
Candidate	Party	Votes	%
Ivan Nagel (incumbent)	United Russia	4,370	51.57%
Vladimir Bogdanov	Communist Party	2,082	24.57%
Muratkhan Duysebekov	Liberal Democratic Party	735	8.67%
Sergey Sokurenko	A Just Russia – For Truth	521	6.15%
Olga Akulicheva	Rodina	465	5.49%
Total		8,474	100%

== See also ==
- 2023 Russian regional elections
