= Ruslan Gulyaev =

Russian politician

- Руслан Александрович Гуляев

Deputy of the State Duma

Personal details
- Born: Vladimir Fedorovich Edalov; January 19, 1982 (age 44) Penza, Penza Oblast, RSFSR, USSR
- Party: United Russia

Ruslan Aleksandrovich Gulyaev (born January 19, 1982, Penza) is a Russian statesman, political and public figure.

== Biography ==
Ruslan Gulyaev graduated from Penza State University in (2004); he completed a postgraduate course at V.G. Belinsky Penza State Pedagogical University in (2006). Candidate of Historical Sciences.

He has been a member of the United Russia party since 2002.

In 2006, he became an associate professor at the Department of Political Science of V.G.Belinsky Penza State Pedagogical University.

In 2007 he became the winner of the regional stage of the "Young Guard" federal programme "PolitZavod" and was included in the list of candidates for the State Duma from the Penza region on the list of the party "United Russia".

He was deputy chief of the Penza regional headquarters of "Young Guard of United Russia" on political issues, member and acting chairman of the Youth Parliament under Legislative Assembly of the Penza Region.

He was deputy of the State Duma of the Federal Assembly of the Russian Federation of V convocation from July 7, 2010, from the Penza region (United Russia faction). He was a member of the Education Committee of the State Duma of the Federal Assembly of the Russian Federation.

Since December 22, 2011, he has been Deputy Minister of Education of the Penza Region.
