= Yulia Lazutkina =

Russian politician (born 1981)

- Юлия Лазуткина
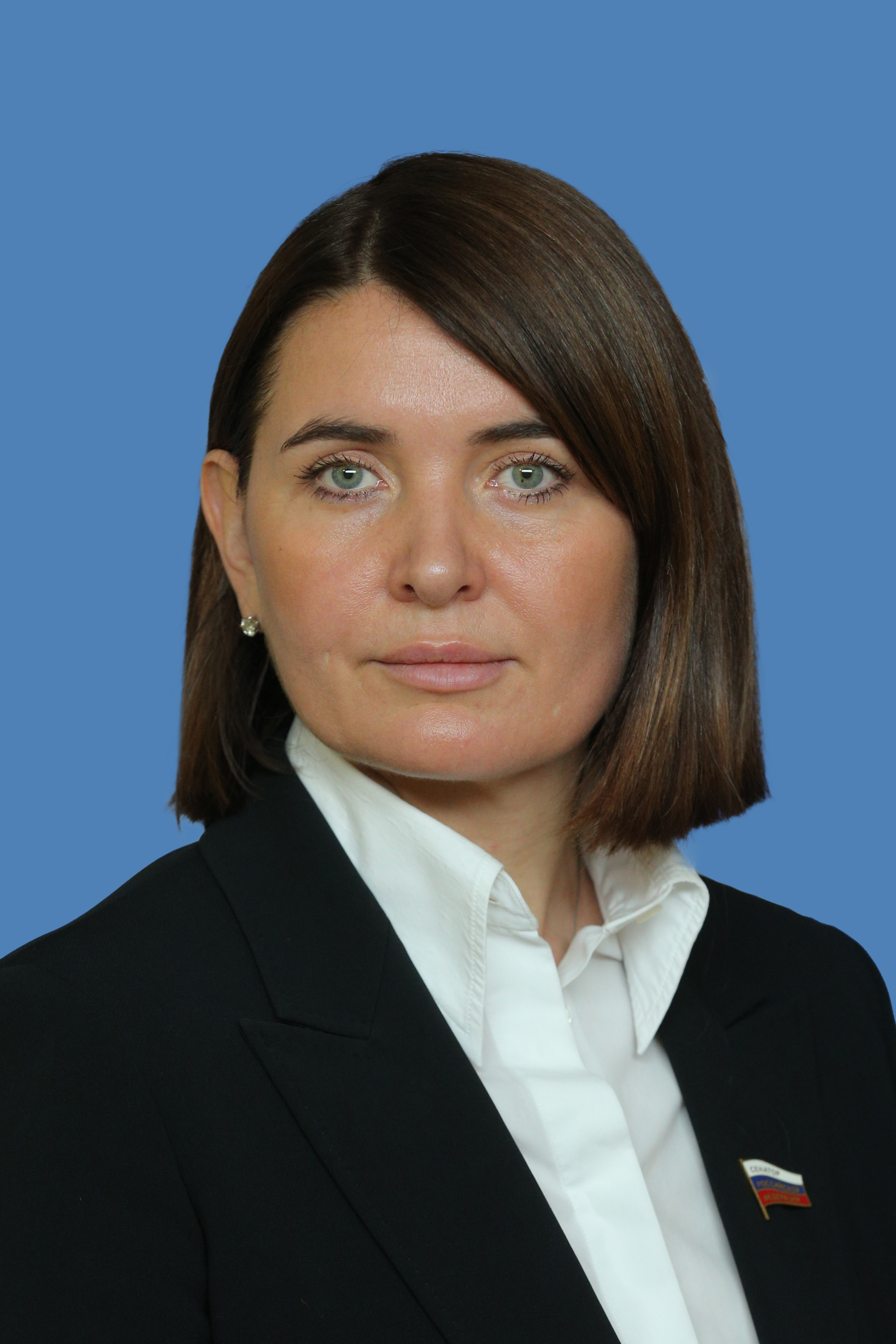

Senator from Penza Oblast
- Incumbent
- Assumed office 21 September 2022
- Preceded by: Oleg Melnichenko

Personal details
- Born: Yulia Lazutkina; 11 March 1981 (age 45) Kolyshleysky District, Penza Oblast, Russian Soviet Socialist Republic, Soviet Union
- Party: United Russia

Yulia Viktorovna Lazutkina (Russian: Юлия Викторовна Лазуткина; born 11 March 1981) is a Russian politician serving as a senator from Penza Oblast since 21 September 2022.

== Biography ==
Yulia Lazutkina was born on 11 March 1981 in Kolyshleysky District, Penza Oblast. Her father, Viktor Lazutkin was a local politician and, later, a deputy of the 4th State Duma. In 2002, she graduated from the Penza State Pedagogical University. From 2011 to 2013, she was the general director of the OOO "Market+" that specialized on selling chocolate products. From 2013 to 2015, she worked at the "Concrete plant" Lomovsky ". From 2017 to 2021, Lazutkina was the deputy of the Legislative Assembly of Penza Oblast. On 29 April 2021, she became the senator from the Legislative Assembly of Penza Oblast. She was re-elected on 21 September 2022.

Yulia Lazutkina is under personal sanctions introduced by the European Union, the United Kingdom, the USA, Canada, Switzerland, Australia, Ukraine, New Zealand, for ratifying the decisions of the "Treaty of Friendship, Cooperation and Mutual Assistance between the Russian Federation and the Donetsk People's Republic and between the Russian Federation and the Luhansk People's Republic" and providing political and economic support for Russia's annexation of Ukrainian territories.
