= Nikolay Kondratyuk =

Russian politician

Nikolay Kondradyuk
- Николай Кондратюк
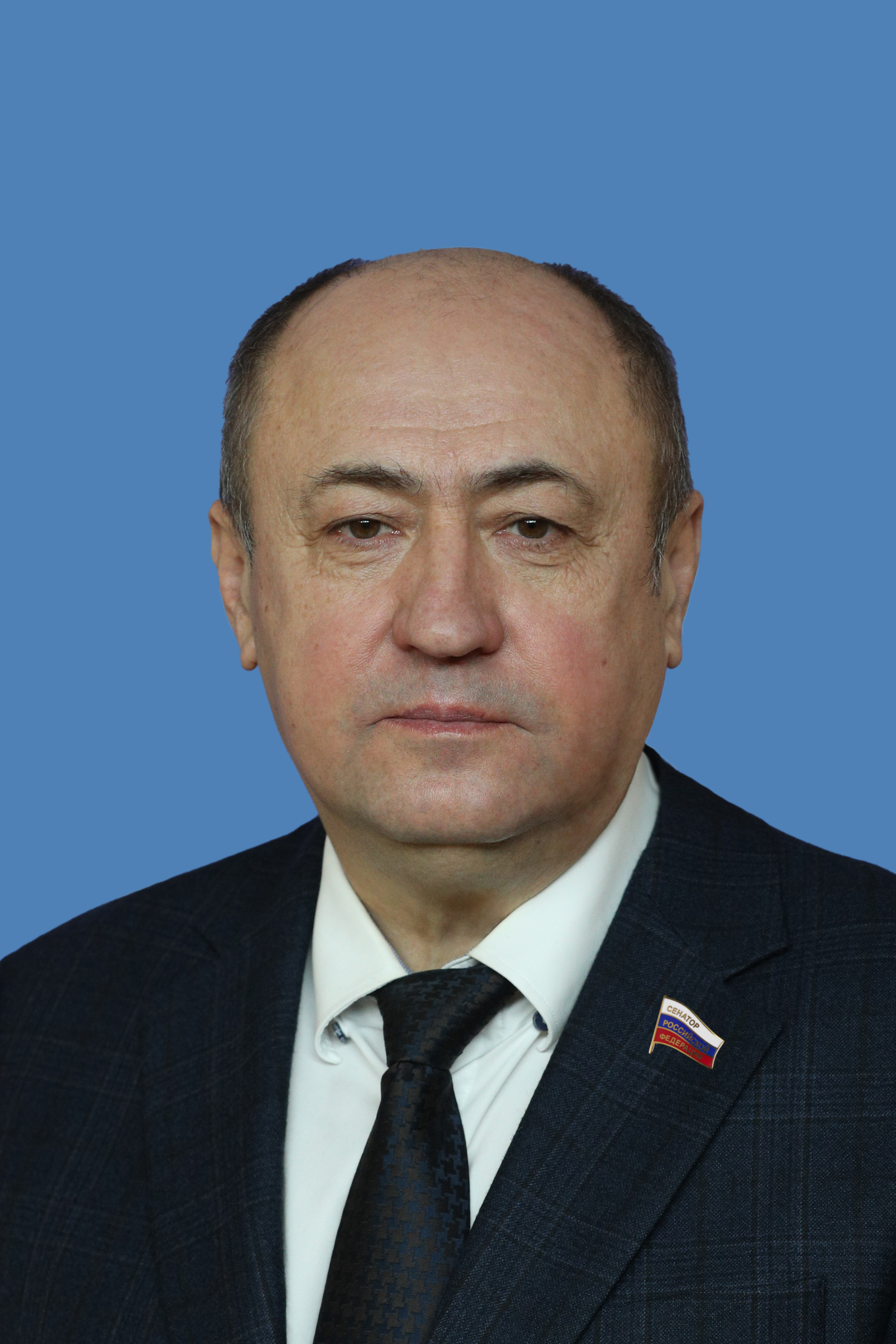

Senator of the executive authority of Penza Oblast
- Incumbent
- Assumed office 21 December 2021
- Preceded by: Maria Lvova-Belova

Deputy director of the Federal Guard Service
- In office 2016–2020

Director of the Federal Guard Service in Crimea
- In office 2014–2016

Personal details
- Born: Nikolay Fyodorovich Kondratyuk; 11 July 1957 (age 68) Soviet Union

Nikolay Fyodorovich Kondratyuk (Russian: Николай Фёдорович Кондратюк; born 11 July 1957), is a Russian politician who is currently the Senator of the executive authority of Penza Oblast since 21 December 2021. He had been the deputy director of the Federal Guard Service from 2016 to 2020.

Due to support for the violation of the territorial integrity of Ukraine during the Russo-Ukrainian war, he is under personal international sanctions from the European Union, the United States, the United Kingdom and a number of other countries.

== Biography ==
Nikolay Kondratyuk was born on 11 July 1957.

In 1979 he graduated from the Oryol Higher Military Command School of Communications M. I. Kalinin (subsequently became part of the Russian Federation Security Guard Service Federal Academy).

In the 2000s he was an assistant to Moscow Mayor Yury Luzhkov, and in 2007 he was fired. From February 2008 to September 2012 he was the head of the administration of the head of the Odintsovo district, Aleksandr Gladyshev.

In 2012 he was appointed Deputy Head of the Security Service of the President of the Russian Federation of the Federal Guard Service (FSO) of Russia. From 2014 to 2016, he served as the director of the Federal Guard Service in Crimea. Between 2016 and 2020, Kondratyuk served as Secretary of State – Deputy Director of the Federal Guard Service of Russia.

On 2 September 2019 the Republic published information about the property of members of the Kondratyuk family with a total value of 894 million rubles in the prestigious village of Znamensky Prostory near President Vladimir Putin's residence Novo-Ogaryovo.

On 30 January 2020 by decree of President Putin, he was relieved of his post as deputy director of the FSO.

He later worked in Moscow as an adviser to the general director of LLC Innovative Security Solutions Company.

On 21 December 2021 by decree of the Governor of Penza Oblast Oleg Melnichenko, Kondratyuk was appointed a member of the Federation Council, a representative of the region's executive body for the period until September 2026, when Melnichenko's powers expire.
