= Legislative Assembly of Zabaykalsky Krai =

Regional parliament of Zabaykalsky Krai, Russia

Legislative Assembly of Zabaykalsky Krai Законодательное собрание Забайкальского края
- 4th legislature

Type
- Type: Unicameral

History
- Founded: 2008
- Preceded by: Chita Oblast Duma, Duma of Agin-Buryat Autonomous Okrug

Leadership
- Chairman: Yury Kon, United Russia since 12 May 2021

Structure
- Seats: 50
- Political groups: United Russia (42); CPRF (3); LDPR (4); SRZP (1)

Elections
- Voting system: Mixed
- Last election: 10 September 2023
- Next election: 2028

Meeting place
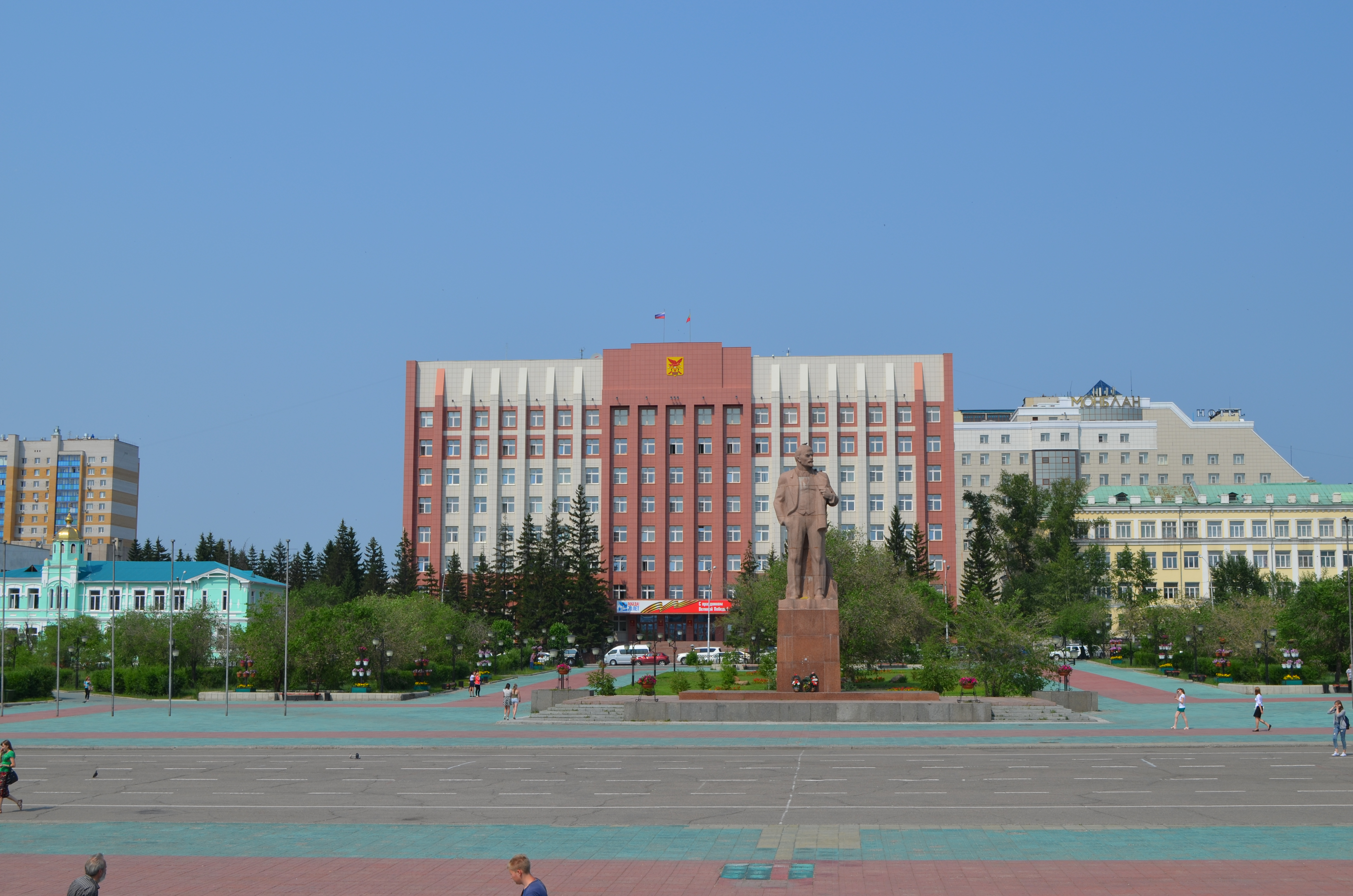
- 34 Leningradskaya Street, Chita

Website
- zaksobr-chita.ru

The Legislative Assembly of Zabaykalsky Krai (Russian: Законодательное собрание Забайкальского края) is the regional parliament of Zabaykalsky Krai, a federal subject of Russia. A total of 50 deputies are elected for five-year terms.

== Elections ==
=== 2008 ===
Party	%	Seats
United Russia + Agrarian Party of Russia		33
LDPR		2
CPRF		2
A Just Russia		2
Registered voters/turnout		

=== 2013 ===
Party	%	Seats
United Russia		36
LDPR		4
CPRF		4
A Just Russia		4
Independent		2
Registered voters/turnout		

=== 2018 ===
Party	%	Seats
United Russia	28.30	21
LDPR	24.60	10
CPRF	24.59	14
A Just Russia	8.97	3
Party of Pensioners of Russia	6.04	1
Patriots of Russia	3.38	0
Registered voters/turnout	22.04	

=== 2023 ===
Party	%	Seats
United Russia	56.94	42
LDPR	15.64	4
CPRF	9.85	3
SR-ZP	6.29	1
New People	4.12	0
Communists of Russia	2.03	0
Rodina	2.01	0
Registered voters/turnout	26.61	

== List of chairpersons ==
- Anatoly Pavlovich Romanov – 2008–2010
- Stepan Zhiryakov – 2010–2013
- Natalia Zhdanova – 2013–2016
- Sergey Mikhailov – 2016 (interim)
- Igor Likhanov – 2016–2021
- Yury Kon (Kon Eung-Hwa) – 2021–present

== Representation in the Federal Council ==
- Sergei Petrovich Mikhailov - Since October 8, 2018
