= Nikolay Simonov =

Nikolay Simonov may refer to:

- Nikolay Simonov (actor)
- Nikolay Simonov (politician)
