= Alexey Dmitrienko =

Russian politician (born 1972)

- Алексей Дмитриенко
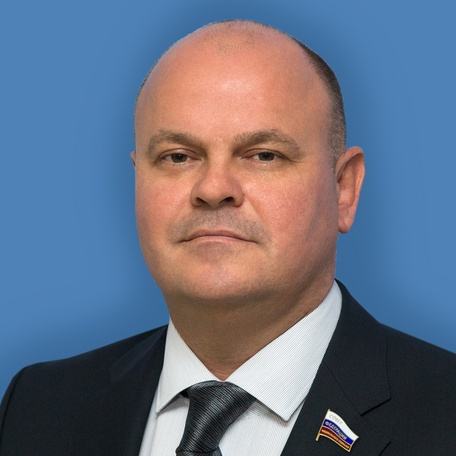

Senator from Penza Oblast
- In office 12 September 2016 – 21 September 2020
- Preceded by: Vasily Bochkaryov
- Succeeded by: Maria Lvova-Belova

Personal details
- Born: Alexey Dmitrienko; 23 August 1972 (age 53) Pallasovka, Russian SFSR, Soviet Union
- Party: United Russia
- Education: A.F. Mozhaysky Military-Space Academy

Alexey Gennadievich Dmitrienko (Russian: Алексей Геннадиевич Дмитриенко; born 23 August 1972) is a Russian politician who served as a senator from Penza Oblast from 2016 to 2020.

== Career ==
Alexey Dmitrienko was born on 23 August 1972 in Pallasovka, Volgograd Oblast. In 1994, Dmitrienko graduated from the A.F. Mozhaysky Military-Space Academy. From 1989 to 1998, he served in the Soviet Armed Forces. In 2004, he started working at the Research Institute of Physical Measurements in Penza. In 2009, Dmitrienko was appointed the CEO of the institute. From 2012 to 2016, he also served as a deputy of the Legislative Assembly of Penza Oblast. From 2016 to 2020, he represented Penza Oblast in the Federation Council.
