= Maria Lvova-Belova =

Russian politician (born 1984)

- Мария Львова-Белова
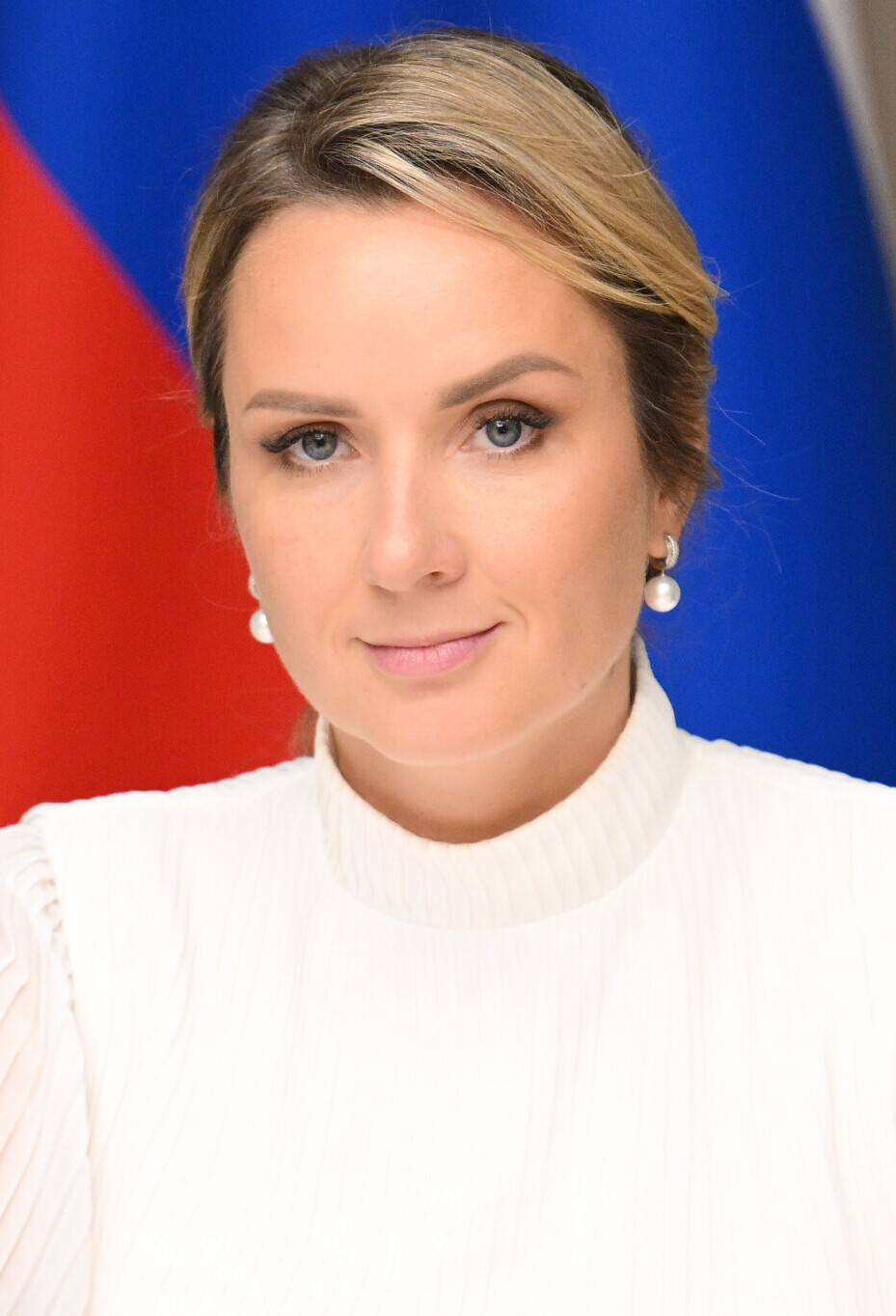
- Official portrait

Children's Rights Commissioner for the President of Russia
- Incumbent
- Assumed office 27 October 2021
- President: Vladimir Putin
- Preceded by: Anna Kuznetsova

Senator from Penza Oblast
- In office 21 September 2020 – 27 October 2021
- Preceded by: Alexey Dmitrienko
- Succeeded by: Nikolay Kondratyuk

Personal details
- Born: 25 October 1984 (age 41) Penza, Soviet Union
- Party: United Russia
- Spouse: Pavel Kogelman (m. 2003)
- Children: 23 (Note: 5 biological, 18 adopted)

Maria Alekseyevna Lvova-Belova (Note: In this name that follows East Slavic naming customs, the patronymic is Alexeyevna and the family name is Lvova-Belova.) (Note: Russian: Мария Алексеевна Львова-Белова, IPA: [mɐˈrʲijɐ‿ɐlʲɪˈksʲejɪvnə ˈlʲvovə bʲɪˈɫovə]) (born 25 October 1984) is a Russian politician. She has been the Presidential Commissioner for Children's Rights since October 2021, when she was appointed to the position by Russian president Vladimir Putin.

On 17 March 2023, the International Criminal Court, amidst an ongoing investigation, issued arrest warrants for Putin and Lvova-Belova. Her charges concern her role in the unlawful deportation of Ukrainian children to Russia since the beginning of the Russian invasion of Ukraine in February 2022.

== Early life and education ==
Lvova-Belova was born into a Russian family in Penza, a city in the Russian SFSR of the erstwhile Soviet Union, on 25 October 1984. She graduated from the A. A. Arkhangelsky College of Culture and Arts as a conductor in 2002.

== Political career ==
=== Activities between 2011 and 2021 ===
From 2011 to 2014 and 2017 to 2019, she was a member of the Civic Chamber of Penza Oblast, the latter term overlapping one in the Civic Chamber of the Russian Federation. In 2019, she was elected co-chair of the All-Russia People's Front regional headquarters.

In 2019, Lvova-Belova joined the United Russia party (the ID card was given to her on 23 November by Prime Minister Dmitry Medvedev). On 24 November, she was elected to the Presidium of the General Council of the United Russia, and she became the co-chair of the working group to support civil society. In September 2020, reelected governor of Penza Oblast Ivan Belozertsev appointed her to the Federation Council of Russia from Penza Oblast's executive branch. After the 2021 snap election, she was reappointed by Oleg Melnichenko.

On 27 October 2021, Russian president Vladimir Putin appointed Senator Maria Lvova-Belova as the federal Commissioner for Children's Rights, one month after previous commissioner Anna Kuznetsova became an MP.

=== Russian invasion of Ukraine (2022–present) ===
==== Deportation of Ukrainian children to Russia ====
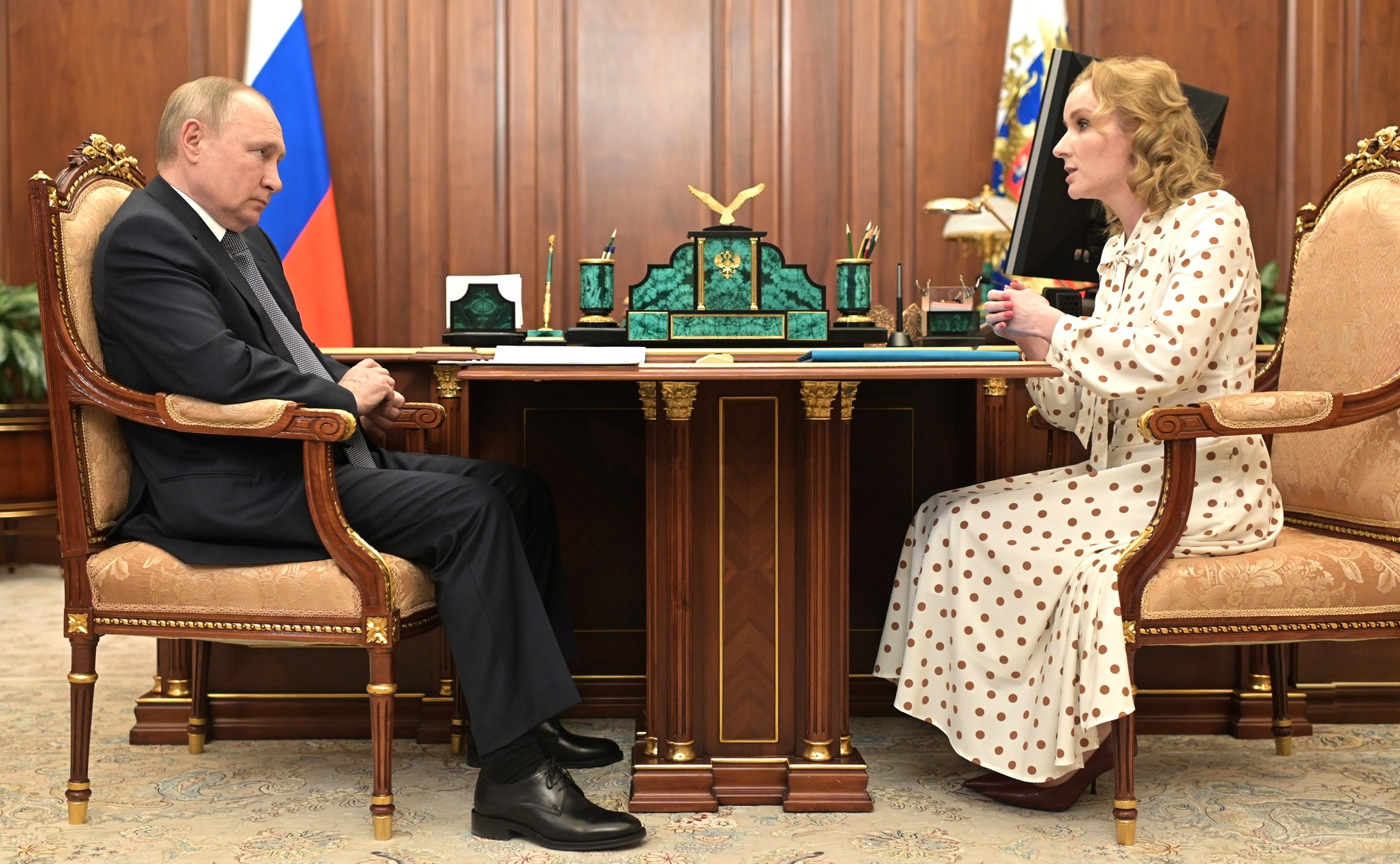
Lvova-Belova meeting with Russian president Vladimir Putin in March 2022, one month into the Russian invasion of Ukraine

Lvova-Belova has been closely involved with the program of abducting Ukrainian children to Russia, being present at an event in Moscow where 14 Ukrainian children received their Russian identity papers in July 2022. In September 2022, she reported that a group of children from Mariupol had at first shown their resistance by singing the Ukrainian national anthem, but had soon learned to "love Russia". Ukrainian and British officials accused her of supervising the forcible deportation and adoption of children from Ukraine during the 2022 Russian invasion of Ukraine. Russian programs to transfer Ukrainian children to Russia and re-educate them as Russians had begun in 2014.

==== International sanctions and ICC arrest warrant ====
She was sanctioned by the United Kingdom in June 2022, by the European Union in July 2022, by the United States in September 2022, and by Japan in January 2023.

A warrant for Lvova-Belova's arrest was issued by the International Criminal Court on 17 March 2023, which alleges she is responsible for the unlawful deportation of children from Ukraine to Russia during the invasion; a similar warrant was issued for Putin.

In 2025 Lvova-Belova gave an interview to Russian media in which she admitted she "forcibly took a child from Mariupol for herself", changed his legal name and "reeducated" him to suppress his Ukrainian identity which he manifested while opposing the forced transfer to Moscow. Lvova-Belova also admitted that the ICC warrant makes life difficult for her.

In May 2026 children abducted to Russia and then returned to Ukraine testified that Lvova-Belova personally told them that they are "Russian children, that Russia will win, that Russia is the best country ever, and that we would have more opportunities there than in Ukraine", which will "exist no more soon", clarifying that the best career path for them would be to join Russian "youth military programs".

== Personal life ==
Lvova-Belova married Pavel Kogelman, a priest of the Russian Orthodox Church and formerly a programmer, in 2003. They have five biological and eighteen adopted children. The former were born in 2005, 2007, 2010, 2014 and 2018. In February 2023, she adopted a 15-year-old boy from Mariupol, which The Moscow Times said would likely spark outrage due to the concurrent deportation program.

In 2024, she was reported to be in a romantic relationship with Orthodox media tycoon Konstantin Malofeev. The two reportedly married at a ceremony in the elite village of Deauville in Moscow Oblast in September 2024.

== See also ==
- Yelizaveta Glinka, a Russian "charity celebrity" who started state programs of relocating Ukrainian children to Russia.

Political offices
Preceded by Anna Kuznetsova	Children's Rights Commissioner for the President of Russia; 2021-present	Incumbent
Preceded by Alexey Dmitrienko	Senator from Penza Oblast; 2020-2021	Succeeded by Nikolay Kondratyuk
