= Anna Kuznetsova =

Russian politician (born 1982)

Anna Kuznetsova MP
- Анна Кузнецова
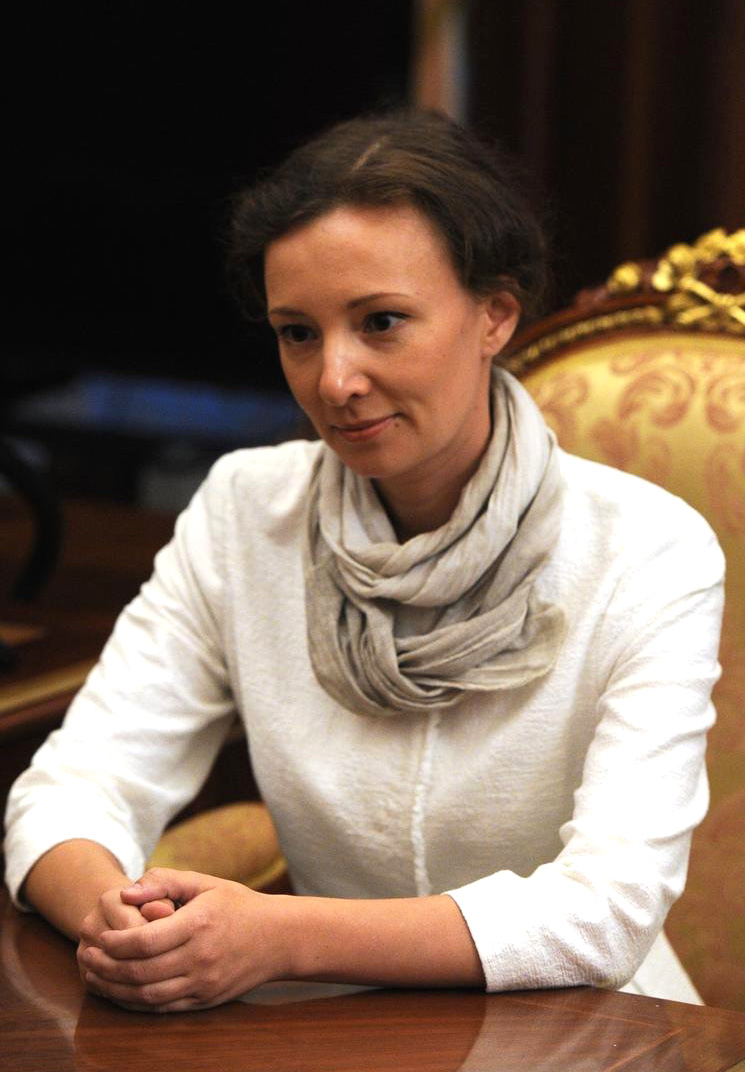
- Kuznetsova in 2016

Vice Chairman of the State Duma Russia
- Incumbent
- Assumed office 12 October 2021
- Chairman: Vyacheslav Volodin
- Preceded by: Olga Timofeeva

Deputy of the State Duma Russia
- Incumbent
- Assumed office 19 September 2021
- Constituency: Russia

Children's Rights Commissioner for the President of the Russian Federation
- In office 9 September 2016 – 29 September 2021
- President: Vladimir Putin
- Preceded by: Pavel Astakhov
- Succeeded by: Maria Lvova-Belova

Personal details
- Born: 3 January 1982 (age 44) Penza, RSFSR, USSR
- Party: United Russia
- Spouse: Alexey Kuznetsov (m. 2003)
- Children: 7
- Education: Penza Pedagogical Institute
- Occupation: psychologist, public figure, human rights activist
- Profession: Psychologist

Anna Yuryevna Kuznetsova (Russian: Анна Юрьевна Кузнецова; born 3 January 1982) is a Russian politician. Vice Chairman of the State Duma Russia since 12 October 2021.

Previously, she was Children's Rights Commissioner for the President of the Russian Federation between 2016 and 2021.

== Early life and education ==
Kuznetsova was born 3 January 1982 in Penza, Russian SFSR, Soviet Union. Her father was a builder and her mother was an engineer. She also has a brother. In 1997, she attended Secondary School Number 72 in Penza. From 1998 to 1999, she studied at the Pedagogical Lyceum No. 3, which was also in Penza. In 2003, she graduated from the V.G. Belinsky Penza State Pedagogical University (currently the PSU), qualifying as an educational psychologist.

== Early career ==
Kuznetsova then began her social activities as a volunteer. She looked after children in the regional children's hospital. In 2008 until 2010, she was the founder of the public organisation, Blagovest along while her husband was the chairman.

In 2011, Kuznetsova founded the Pokrov Foundation which provides assistance to large and low-income families. In the Penza region of Russia, the fund contributed to the implementation of the comprehensive demographic program "Life is a sacred gift", where one of the main goals was prevention aimed at reducing the number of abortions. In that same year, she initiated the All-Russian festival competition for youth social groups. The purpose of which was the creation and preservation of family values.

In 2014, Kuznetsova joined the All-Russia People's Front. Immediately after that, her foundation, the Pokrov Foundation received a grant from the state and funding for the creation of a Maternity Protection Center with a permanent shelter for mothers with children in difficult life situations. A year later, Kuznetsova lead the Penza Executive Committee. She contributed to the inspections of maternity hospitals and the obstetric care system. Around the same time, she was the head of the regional brands of the Mother of Russia organisation. Further assistance of Kuznetsova's career was provided by the first deputy head of the presidential administration, Vyacheslav Volodin.

Kuznetsova holds pro-life views. According to some media, she expressed support for telegony in an interview for a Penza Medical Journal; however, she denied that claim, stating her disbelief in telegony.

Since 2015, Kuznetsova has been the Chairman of the Association of the Organisation for the Protection of the Family, member of the Women's Council under the Governor of the Penza Region, Assistant to the Chairman of the Commission of the Interfaith Interaction and involved with Assistance in the Protection of Freedom of Conscience of the Public Chamber of the Penza Region.

At September 2015, Kuznetsova entered the working group to develop proposals for additional regulation of the activities of socially oriented non-profit organisations. In that same year, President Vladimir Putin signed a decree according to which the Pokrov Foundation became the operator of presidential grants.

In 2016, before she was assigned as the Children's Rights Commissioner, Kuznetsova participated in the election primaries of the political party United Russia. She came fifth place in the party group results.

== Political career ==
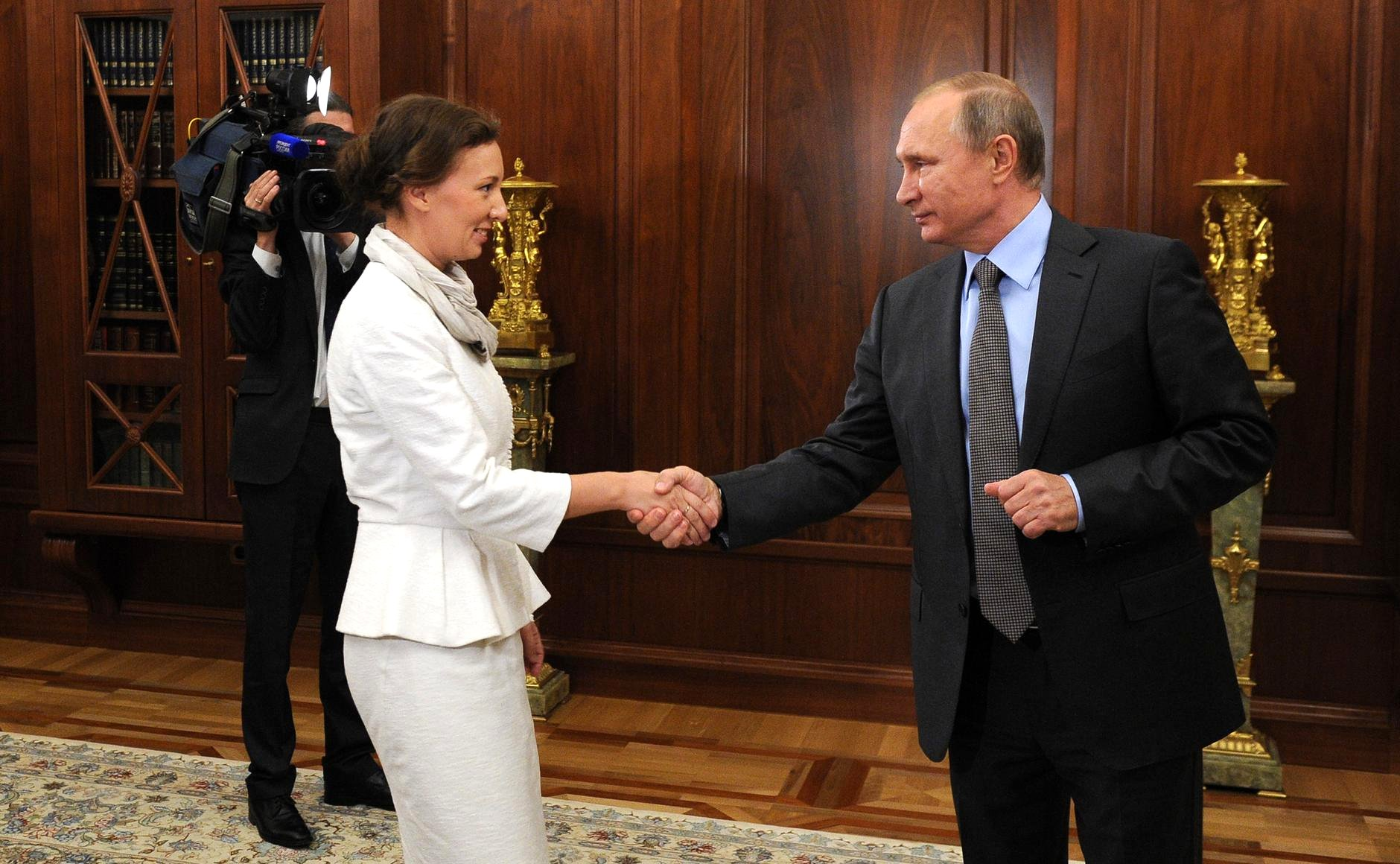
Kuznetsova with President Vladimir Putin, 2016

=== Children's Rights Commissioner ===
==== 2016 ====
On 9 September 2016, Kuznetsova was appointed the role of the Children's Rights Commissioner for the President of the Russian Federation with President Vladimir Putin, assigning the role.

In December 2016, she created a register of sexual predators and pedophiles in order to prevent them from working in any educational institutions in Russia. It was then proposed to introduce a lifelong administrative control over pedophiles in March 2017.

==== 2017–2018 ====
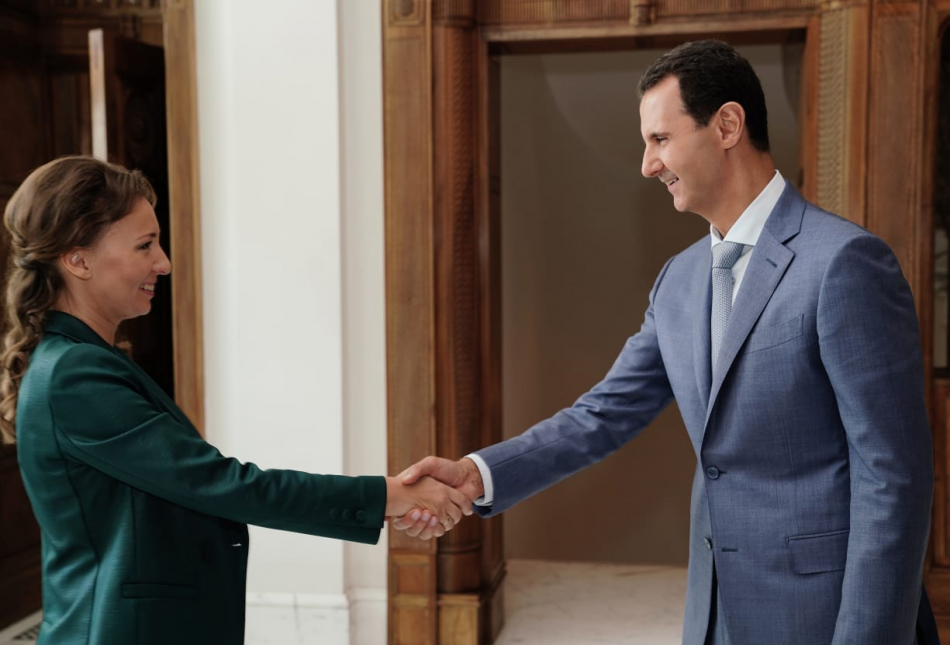
Kuznetsova with President of Syria Bashar al-Assad in 2019.

In January 2017, Kuznetsova took part in the highly publicised seizure of ten foster children from the Moscow Del Family. This began after a statement from a kindergarten teacher who saw bruises on the body of one of the children, later establishing that in fact the children had HIV. After studying the circumstances of the case, the commission of psychologists of the center for social support of the city Zelenograd made a decision to stop any further foster children to stay with that family. This was supported by the head of the Moscow Department of Labour and Social Protection.

After a press conference on 23 December 2016, Vladimir Putin instructed Kuznetsova and the Russian Ministry of Labour and Social Protection of the Russian Federation to study the practice of removing children from families in terms of excessively applied measures or unlawfully interfering with the family. On 15 May 2017, Kuznetsova cited data from the prosecutors office and told media that there were 'virtually no registered cases of this kind'. These words caused controversy among 75 parental and families organisations across Russia. An open letter was then sent to President Vladimir Putin, in which they stated that the public does not agree with this registered data.

In May 2017, a member of the Federation Council, Yelena Mizulina presented an alternative report, based on the data collected by non-governmental organisations opposed to Kuznetsova. The founders of the Ural Parents Committee and the Yakaterinburg City Parents' Committee, supported Kuznetsova, explaining that over the eight years of their activity in the Sverdlovsk Region in Russia, they had not encounter a single case of illegal interference of the guardianship authorities in the family. Furthermore, the illegal removal of children.

Later in May 2017, Kuznetsova visited Finland, where she signed the Children's Ombudsman of this Country, Tuomas Kurttila a memorandum on co-operation in the support of children's rights. The trip caused discontent among the activists of the All-Russian Parental Resistance, who held several one-off picket protests. On 24 May 2017, one of the activists at the build of the Public Chamber of the Russian Federation unsuccessfully waited for Kuznetsova with a poster on which was written, "Russia does not need an authorised representative of the introduction of Finnish juvenile technologies". By 29 and 30 May, activities of the same group held a series of small protests in different cities in Russia, protesting against Kuznetsova and asking Vladimir Putin not to sign the upcoming childhood strategy which is valid from 2018 until 2027 until it is discussed with the public.

Kuznetsova reformed public structures under the federal Commissioner for the Children's Rights. With her, a public council was established, which was divided into working groups. The structure included many priests of the Russian Orthodox Church, as well as activists of Orthodox public associations. The establishment of the council drew criticism. In May 2017, the chairman of the All-Russian Parental Resistance organisation Maria Mamikonyan and the heads of some of the public organisations left the council.

In November 2018, she stated that women can have their genitals circumcised as long as it is medically harmless for that person.

She is strongly opposed to the domestic violence draft, which was proposed by the Russian parliament in December 2019, declaring that the proposed bill is unconstitutional and is imitating similar foreign laws.

==== 2019–2021 ====
In December 2019, after the publication of the law on domestic violence was drafted, Kuznetsova explained to reporters that she repeatedly, gave a negative opinion of the draft, because its norms do not comply with the Russian Constitution. She stated that the bill duplicates the norms of other laws and urged to consider whether it's needed at all.

In September 2021, after being elected to the State Duma, she resigned from the office of Children's Rights Commissioner.

=== Member of the State Duma ===
In June 2021, Kuznetsova was proposed by President Vladimir Putin as one of the leading candidates of the United Russia party list for the 2021 legislative election.

On 19 September 2021, she was elected to the State Duma on the party list of United Russia. After that, she resigned from the office of Children's Rights Commissioner.

On 5 October 2021, Kuznetsova was nominated for the office of Deputy Chair of the State Duma.

==== Sanctions ====
In response to the Russian invasion of Ukraine which Kuznetsova voted for, she was sanctioned by the European Union in February 2022, by Switzerland and the United Kingdom in March 2022, by Japan in April 2022, by Australia in May 2022, by Ukraine and the United States in September 2022, by New Zealand in October 2022, and by Canada in February 2023.

==== Removal of Ukrainian Children from Kherson's children's home ====
In 2023, Anna Kuznetsova was prominently featured in investigative reporting and the documentary "Putin and Ukraine's Stolen Children," which examined the deportation and forced adoption of Ukrainian children from occupied territories, including the Kherson children's home. As Deputy Chair of the State Duma and co-chair of Russia's Parliamentary Commission on Investigation of the Crimes Committed by the Kiev regime Against Minors, Kuznetsova played a key role in shaping official narratives that justified the removal of Ukrainian children from Kherson's children's home and their subsequent transfer to Russia. She has made public statements accusing Ukrainian authorities of abuse and trafficking, and has denied international allegations regarding the forced transfer of children. Reporting has noted that Kuznetsova's public advocacy and messaging were cited among factors influencing Russian government policy and public explanation of the removals, which have been the subject of widespread international condemnation and multiple criminal investigations. The International Criminal Court has implicated Anna Kuznetsova in facilitating the illegal transfer of Ukrainian children through her legislative and advocacy roles, and has issued arrest warrants for both Kuznetsova and President Vladimir Putin for their involvement in the deportation of children from occupied territories.

== Personal life ==
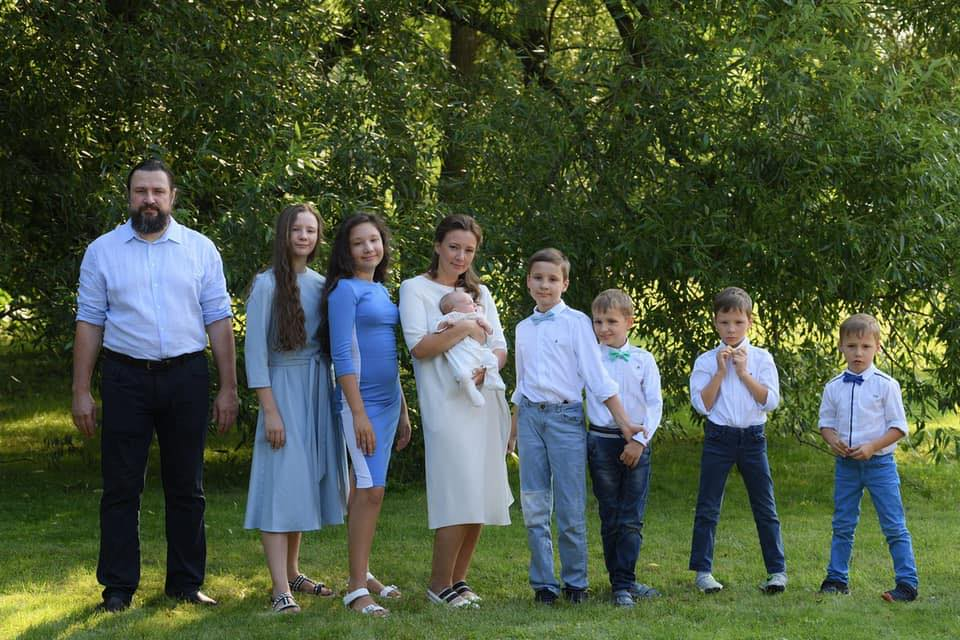
Kuznetsova with her family, 2021

Kuznetsova has been married to Fr. Aleksey Kuznetsov since 2003. Her husband is a priest of the Church of St. Basil of the Great at the Orthodox elite gymnasium in Moscow. They have seven children – two girls and five boys. Their youngest child was born in 2020.

== Awards ==
- Audience Award at the III International Festival of Social Technologies for Life (2012)
- Commemorative medal "In Memory of the 700th anniversary of the Birth of St. Sergius of Radonezh"
- Breastplate – For Good Deeds. III Degree of the Penza Diocese of the Russian Orthodox Church
- Commemorative sign – For merits in the development of the city of Penza
- Medal – For Assistance – Investigative Committee of Russia
- Medal – "In Memory of the Heroes of the Fatherland" of the Russian Ministry of Defence (2019)
- Medal – For contribution to strengthening Law and Order (2019)
- Medal – For purity of thoughts and nobility of deeds
- Medal – For Diligence
- Medal – For Contribution to the Development of the Penitentiary System of Russia

Political offices
Preceded by Pavel Astakhov	Children's Rights Commissioner for the President of Russia; 2016-2021	Succeeded by Maria Lvova-Belova
