= Sergey Mikhailov (politician) =

Russian politician (born 1965)

- Сергей Михайлов
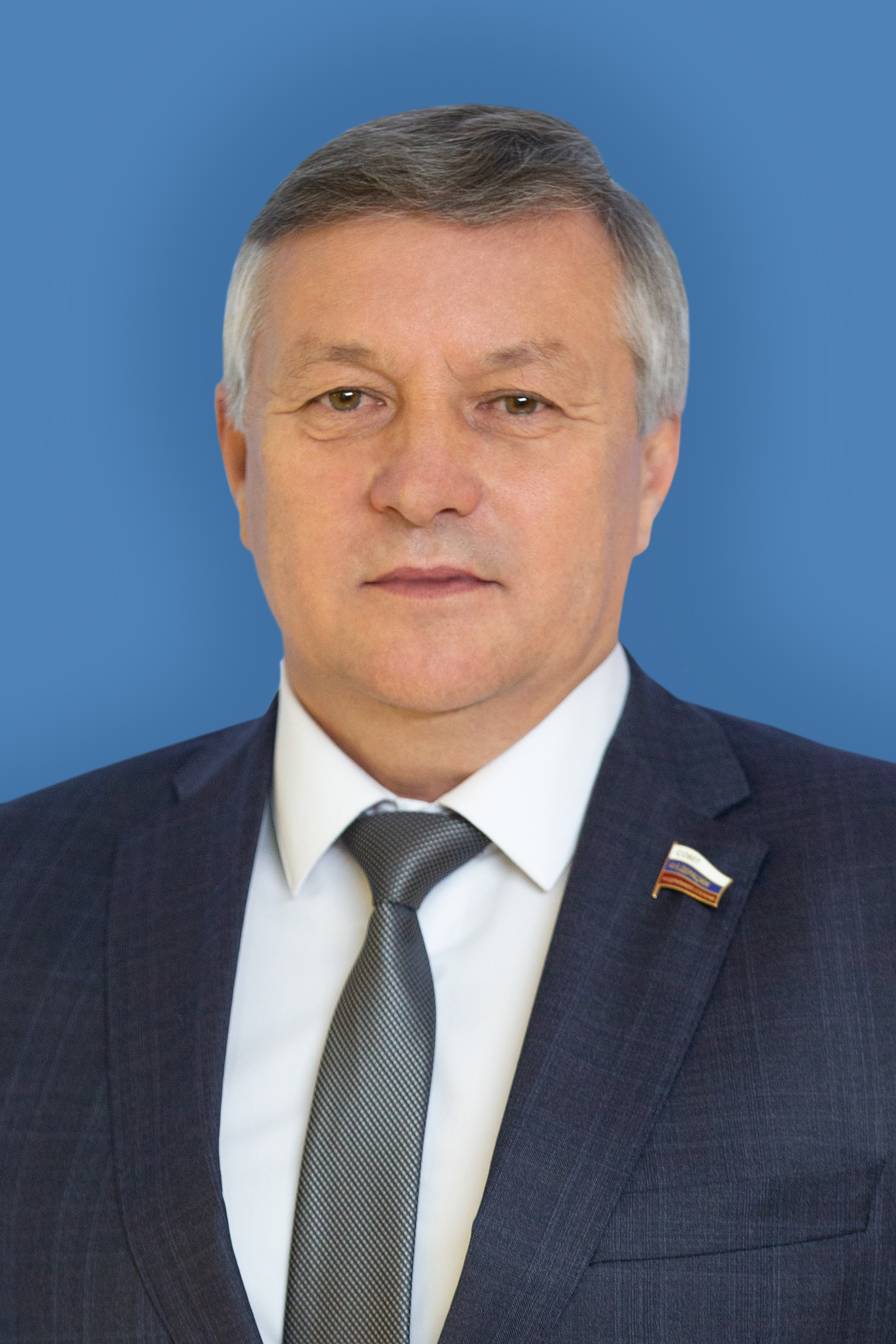

Russian Federation Senator from Zabaykalsky Krai
- Incumbent
- Assumed office 18 October 2018
- Preceded by: Stepan Zhiryakov

Personal details
- Born: Sergey Petrovich Mikhailov; 22 May 1965 (age 60) Nerchinsk, Russian SFSR, Soviet Union
- Party: United Russia

Sergey Petrovich Mikhailov (Russian: Сергей Петрович Михайлов; born 22 May 1965) is a Russian politician who is currently the senator from the Legislative Assembly of Zabaykalsky Krai since 18 October 2018.

== Early life ==
Mikhailov was born on 22 May 1965. He graduated from the Faculty of History of the Chita State Pedagogical Institute in 1990, then taught at the Nerchinsk State Farm-Technical School. Between 1997 and 2008 he was the director of the Nerchinsk Agricultural College. In 2002, he graduated from the Far Eastern Academy of Public Administration with a degree in management.

== Political career ==
He had been a deputy of the Nerchinsk District Council of two convocations from 2000 to 2008. He became a deputy of the Legislative Assembly of Zabaykalsky Krai in 2008. Since September 2013, he was the Chairman of the Committee on Agrarian Policy and the Consumer Market. He was then promoted as the First Deputy Chairman of the Legislative Assembly in October 2016. In February 2016, Mikhailov had been the Acting Chairman of the Legislative Assembly of Zabaikalsky Krai.

Since 2013, he headed the regional branch of United Russia party in Transbaikalia.

On 27 September 2018, 35 members of the Legislative Assembly out of 48 who were present at the meeting voted to empower Mikhailov with the powers of a member of the Federation Council – a representative of the legislative body of state power of the Zabaikasky Krai.

On 8 October, Mikhailov's powers were confirmed by the Federation Council.

Sanctions

Since March 2022, he has been under personal EU and UK sanctions.
