= Vasily Bochkaryov =

Russian politician

- Василий Бочкарёв
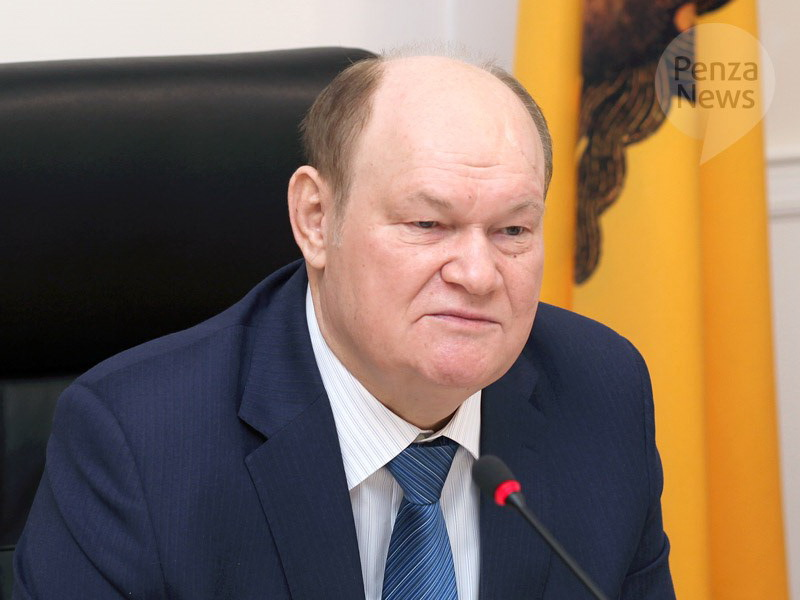
- Bochkaryov in 2011

Member of the Federation Council from Penza Oblast
- In office 21 September 2015 – 22 June 2016
- Preceded by: Vladimir Edalov
- Succeeded by: Alexey Dmitrienko

Governor of Penza Oblast
- In office 2 June 1998 – 25 May 2015
- Succeeded by: Ivan Belozertsev

Head of Administration of Penza Oblast
- In office 18 April 1998 – 2 June 1998
- Preceded by: Anatoly Kovlyagin

Personal details
- Born: Vasily Kuzmich Bochkaryov; 29 April 1949 Iva, Nizhnelomovsky District, Penza Oblast, RSFSR, USSR
- Died: 22 June 2016 (aged 67) Penza, Russia
- Party: Communist Party of the Soviet Union (1967–1991); United Russia
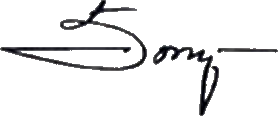
- Signature

Vasily Kuzmich Bochkaryov (Russian: Васи́лий Кузьми́ч Бочкарёв; 29 April 1949 – 22 June 2016) was a Russian politician. He served as Head of Zheleznodorozhny District of Penza from 1987 to 1998, and was elected Head of the Administration of Penza Oblast in April 1998. He became Governor of Penza Oblast in June 1998, and since then has been re-elected two times – in 2002 and 2005. He won his 2002 election by a small margin over his Communist challenger. Since 2015 until his death, Bochkaryov represented Penza Oblast in the Federation Council of Russia.

== Early life and education ==
Vasily Bochkaryov was born on 29 April 1949 to a peasant family in the village of Iva, in Nizhnelomovsky District of Penza Oblast, Russian SSR.

In 1968 Bochkaryov completed Alatyrsk Forest Industry Technical School, then he enrolled at Maxim Gorky Mari Polytechnic Institute and graduated as a forestry engineer in 1973. He later continued his studies and graduated from Penza State Technical University with a degree in State and Municipal Management in 1994, and from the Penza State Agricultural Academy with a degree in Economics and Agricultural Production Management in 1999.

In 2002 he defended his Candidate of Sociological Sciences dissertation at Modern Humanitarian Institute, titled "The Level and Quality of Life as the Object of Control (Regional Aspect)". On 29 September 2013 the community Dissernet published the results of their examination of his thesis, which revealed extensive plagiarism from two other theses.

== Career ==
=== Early career ===
Bochkaryov began his career in 1973 as a forester in Penza Oblast. From 1975 to 1976 he worked as Chief Forester in Kameshkirsky District of Penza Oblast, and then headed the regional forestry workers' supply department until 1977.

He became Superintendent and Deputy Chief of Penza Transport Enterprise No. 1547 in 1977, then headed the Penza Cargo-Motor Transport Enterprise No. 2 from 1980 to 1987. He joined the CPSU at that time.

=== Executive-branch service ===
On 27 April 1987 he was elected Chairman of Penza's Zheleznodorozhny District Executive Committee, while simultaneously serving as Chairman of District Soviet of People's Deputies since 1990. During that time, he befriended Anatoly Kovlyagin, Chairman of Penza Oblast Executive Committee. He died on 22 June 2016 at the age of 67.

== Accusations of academic dishonesty ==
The grassroots expert community Dissernet accused Vasily Bochkarev of heavily plagiarising his Candidate of Sciences thesis.

== Family ==
He was married and had a daughter.

His wife, Valentina Mikhailovna Bochkaryova, served as a member of the board of directors of OAO Biosintez (owned by Boris Shpigel, senator from Penza Oblast). Alexander Pashkov, the vice-governor of Penza Oblast arrested in 2008, stated that Valentina Bochkaryova owned 25% of the shares of OAO Biosintez. The Bochkaryov family did not issue any denial of this information. Valentina Bochkaryova also holds a share in OOO Viktoriya (providing secretarial, editorial, and translation services). In 2009, she appeared as a co-defendant in a lawsuit concerning an unlawfully allocated land plot in Penza at 82 Moskovskaya Street.

His daughter, Natalia Vasilievna Bochkaryova (17 May 1979 – 11 July 2023), owned shares in OOO Imperiya (real estate leasing) and in OOO Saturn, which in turn owns 76% of OOO Penza Bearing Plant. Until 2010, she was among the shareholders of OAO Evlashovsky Timber Processing Plant. According to media reports, the song “Natali,” performed by Nikolai Baskov (former son-in-law of Boris Shpigel), is dedicated to Natalia Bochkaryova.[39] She was found dead in her Moscow apartment on 11 July 2023. The cause of death was acute heart failure.
