= Nikolay Simonov (politician) =

Russian politician

- Николай Симонов
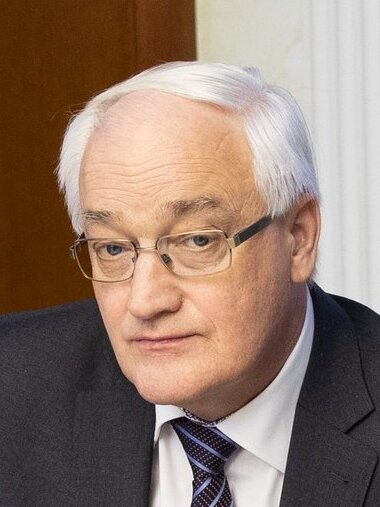

Governor of Penza Oblast (acting)
- In office 23 March 2021 – 26 March 2021
- Preceded by: Ivan Belozertsev
- Succeeded by: Oleg Melnichenko

Personal details
- Born: Nikolay Petrovich Simonov; 7 November 1956 (age 69) Moscow, Soviet Union
- Party: United Russia

Nikolay Petrovich Simonov (Russian: Николай Петрович Симонов; born 7 November 1956), is a Russian politician, appointed Chairman of the Government of Penza Oblast, on 20 November 2015.

He had served as the acting Governor of Penza Oblast from 23 March until 26 March 2021, when Oleg Melnichenko replaced him.

He was the acting Deputy Chairman of the Government of the Penza Region in 2015. He was the General Director of OJSC Penzadieselmash from 2004 to 2014. He was General Director of OJSC Holding Company Kolomensky Zavod from 2014 to 2015.

== Biography ==
Nikolay Simonov was born in Moscow on 7 November 1956.

In 1980, he graduated from the Peoples' Friendship University with a degree in Mechanical Engineering and Translation.

He began his career at the Kirov Kharkiv Turbine Works. Foreman of the 1st mechanical section of shop No. 53 of the Order of Lenin and the Order of the Red Banner of Labor Industrial association of turbine construction "Kharkiv Turbine Works named after S. M. Kirov ".

After military service in the armed forces, he worked at the Penzdizelmash production association, where he rose from a foreman to a director for economics.

In 2004, he was proclaimed General Director of Penzadieselmash OJSC. From May 2014 to October 2015 he worked as the General Director of OJSC Holding Company Kolomensky Zavod.

=== Penza City Duma ===
Simonov was elected as a member of the Penza City Duma of the fourth and fifth convocations, as well as the Legislative Assembly of the region of the fifth convocation. Powers as a deputy of the regional parliament were early terminated at a session held on 18 May 2015.

On 29 October 2015 Simonov became the Deputy Chairman of the Government of Penza Oblast. On 20 November 2015, during the 31st regular session of the Penza Region Legislative Assembly of the fifth convocation, the deputies unanimously agreed to the appointment of Simonov as chairman of the regional government. As a result, he took this position in the newly formed government of the Penza Oblast, enforced by Governor Ivan Belozertsev.

=== Acting governor of Penza Oblast ===
Simonov was briefly acting governor of Penza Oblast, from 23 March 2021, after Belozertsev's dismissal as governor, Simonov was the interim Governor, until 26 March, when the new interim governor, Oleg Melnichenko, replaced him by the order of the President of Russia.
