= Georgy Kamnev =

Russian politician

Georgy Kamnev MP
- Георгий Камнев
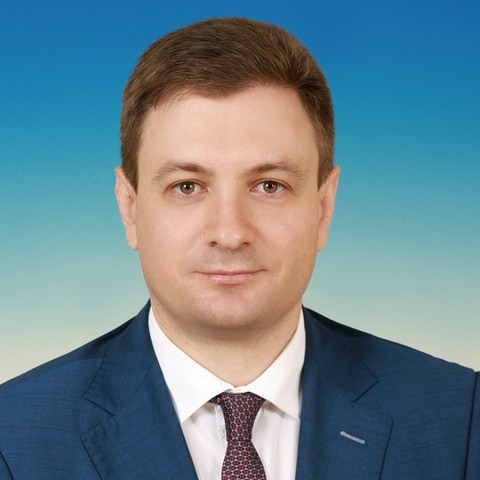

Member of the State Duma (Party List Seat)
- Incumbent
- Assumed office 12 October 2021

Personal details
- Born: 5 October 1983 (age 41); Serdobsk, Penza Oblast, RSFSR, Soviet Union
- Political party: Communist Party of the Russian Federation
- Children: 3
- Education: Penza State Pedagogical University

Georgy Petrovich Kamnev (born 5 October 1983, Serdobsk, Penza Oblast, USSR) is a Russian politician and former deputy of the Legislative Assembly of the Penza Region. He served as the First Secretary of the Penza regional branch of the Communist Party of the Russian Federation (CPRF) from 21 May 2011 to 30 October 2021. Since 27 May 2017, he has been a member of the Presidium of the Central Committee of the CPRF. Following the 2021 Russian legislative election, he became a member of the 8th State Duma.

== Education ==
Georgy Petrovich Kamnev was born on 5 October 1983 in the town of Serdobsk, Penza Region, into a family of workers at the Serdobsk Watch Factory. In 2005, he graduated with honors from the Faculty of Law at Penza State University and subsequently pursued postgraduate studies. That same year, he was named a laureate of the regional competition "Young Lawyer of the Year." In 2008, he completed his postgraduate studies in law. Kamnev has participated in and won numerous All-Russian and international competitions and conferences of legal scholars. His research focuses on the formation and functioning of local self-governing bodies.

== Career ==
In 2001, Georgy Petrovich Kamnev joined the Communist Party of the Russian Federation (CPRF). From 2002 to 2006, he served as an assistant to a deputy of the Penza City Duma. During this period, he also became a voting member of the election commission of Penza, serving as Secretary of the Commission from 2004 to 2009.

From 2005 to 2006, Kamnev worked as the director of the Penza representative office of the insurance company "Standard-Reserve." Between 2006 and 2008, he was employed at Energy Service Company LLC. During this time, he also served as Chairman of the Youth Council at the Penza City Duma from 2006 to 2007 and headed the regional organization of the Leninist Young Communist League of the Russian Federation (LYCL RF) from 2006 to 2009.

From 2006 to 2011, Kamnev worked as an assistant to Viktor Ilyukhin, a deputy of the State Duma of Russia. Between 2008 and 2010, he held various positions within companies of the SCM Group holding. In 2010, he founded and headed the Yurex Group law firm, which provides legal services in the residential real estate sector.

In the 2016 elections to the State Duma of the Federal Assembly of the Russian Federation (VII convocation), Kamnev stood as a candidate for the 146th Penza single-mandate constituency and was also included on the federal list of the Communist Party of the Russian Federation. He was also on the federal list from the Communist Party of the Russian Federation.

Kamnev is the author of nine published research works.

== Political activity ==
From 2004 to 2011, Georgy Petrovich Kamnev served as an assistant to Viktor Ilyukhin, a deputy of the State Duma. During this period, from 2005 to 2009, he was also the First Secretary of the Penza regional committee of the Komsomol. From 2006 to 2008, he served as Chairman of the Youth Council at the Penza City Duma, and from 2006 to 2011, he held the position of Secretary of the Penza regional committee of the Communist Party of the Russian Federation (CPRF).

Since 2011, Kamnev has been the First Secretary of the Penza regional committee of the CPRF. Upon his election as First Secretary on 21 May 2011, he became the youngest First Secretary of a regional committee of the CPRF in Russia. On 24 December 2011, by decision of the plenum of the CPRF regional committee, Kamnev replaced Vladimir Simagin, who had left for the State Duma, as a deputy in the Legislative Assembly of the Penza Region (IV convocation).

On 14 October 2012, Kamnev was elected as a deputy of the Legislative Assembly of the Penza Region (V convocation) from the Penza regional branch of the CPRF. The party list of the CPRF secured 12.52% of the votes, resulting in the election of two deputies—Georgy Kamnev and Andrei Zuev—to the Legislative Assembly. Kamnev currently serves as the Deputy Chairman of the Committee for State Construction and Local Self-Government Bodies in the Legislative Assembly of the Penza Region.

Since 24 February 2013, Kamnev has been a member of the Central Committee of the CPRF. Following the conclusion of the XVII Congress of the CPRF on 27 May 2017, he was elected as a member of the Presidium of the Central Committee of the CPRF.

Kamnev advocates granting Russian citizens the right to carry firearms, arguing that such a measure would enhance the quality of work of public authorities.

On 24 March 2022, Kamnev was among the 324 members of the State Duma sanctioned by the United States Treasury in response to the 2022 Russian invasion of Ukraine.

== Family ==
Georgy Petrovich Kamnev is married and has two daughters and a son.

== Links ==
- Page on the website of the Penza regional committee of the Communist Party of the Russian Federation
- Personal page on the official website of the Communist Party
- Personal page on the website of the Legislative Assembly of the Penza region
