= Stepan Zhiryakov =

Russian politician (1948–2025)

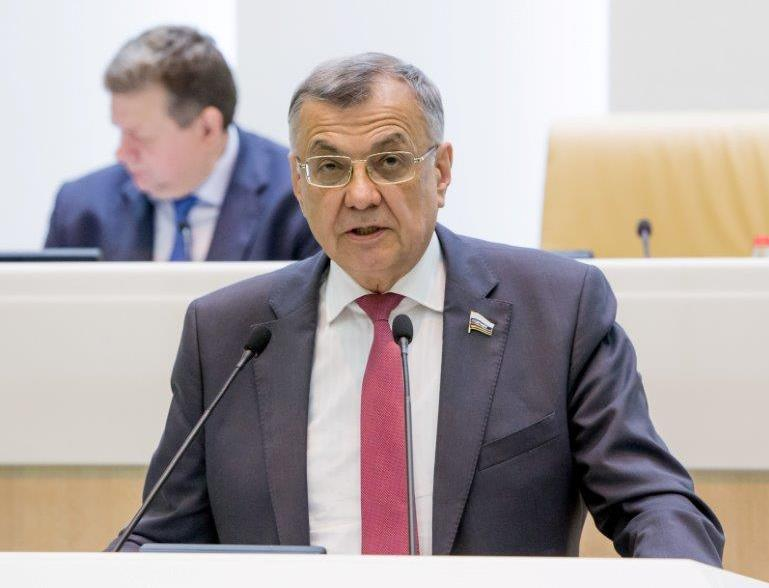
Zhiryakov in 2017

Stepan Mikhailovich Zhiryakov (Russian: Степан Михайлович Жиряков; 2 March 1948 – 28 July 2025) was a Russian politician. He served as Senator of Russia from Zabaykalsky Krai from 2013 to 2018.

== Life and career ==
Zhiryakov was born on 2 March 1948 in Pervomaisky, Shilkinsky district, Chita Oblast, Russian SFSR, USSR. He graduated from Pervomaiskaya secondary school No 2. In the same year, he began his career as an apprentice instrumentation fitter at the Trans-Baikal Mining and Processing Plant. He had been involved in politics since the 1980s.

A member of the first and second convocations and former chairman of the Legislative Assembly of Zabaykalsky Krai, Zhiryakov was appointed to the Senate of Russia as a representative of Zabaykalsky Legislative Assembly from 16 October 2013 to September 2018.

Zhiryakov died on 28 July 2025, at the age of 77.
