= Party of Pensioners of Russia =

Former political party in Russia

Party of Pensioners of Russia Партия пенсионеров России
- Abbreviation: PPR (English); ППР (Russian)
- Leader: Nikolay Chebotaryov
- Founder: Valery Ryazansky
- Founded: May 15, 2012
- Dissolved: June 13, 2019
- Preceded by: Union of Pensioners of Russia
- Headquarters: 71st building, Izmailovo Highway, Moscow, Russia. 105613
- Newspaper: Pensioners of Russia
- Ideology: Pensioners' interests
- National affiliation: All-Russia People's Front
- Colours: Blue
- Slogan: "Remembering the past — we believe in the future!" (Russian: "Помня о прошлом — верим в будущее!")
- Seats in the Regional Parliaments: 1 / 3,994

Website
- vppppr.ru

The Party of Pensioners of Russia; Russian: Партия пенсионеров России; ППР; Partiya pensionerov Rossii) was a political party in Russia that existed in 2012-2019 under the chairmanship of Nikolai Chebotaryov, executive director of the Union of Pensioners of Russia.

In 2018, following the results of the elections to the Legislative Assembly of the Zabaykalsky Krai, party gained 6.04%, having received 1 seat and a privilege to participate in the elections to the State Duma in 2021 without collecting signatures.

On June 13, 2019, as a result of a planned inspection by the Ministry of Justice, the Supreme Court liquidated the Party of Pensioners of Russia for insufficient participation in regional elections for seven years.

== History ==
The party was created at the founding congress on May 15, 2012 on the basis of the Union of Pensioners of Russia, chaired by the Head of the Federation Council Committee on Social Policy Valery Ryazansky, the chairman and deputy of the party are the leaders of the Union of Pensioners of Russia.

In 2012, in the elections to the Legislative Assembly of Penza Oblast, she received 11,969 (2.20%) votes, to the Yaroslavl City Duma, 4,382 (3.88%) votes, passed to the City Duma of the city of Kamensk-Uralsky, Sverdlovsk Oblast, gaining 2,444 (9.38%) votes.

In 2018, following the results of the elections to the Legislative Assembly of the Zabaykalsky Krai, she gained 6.04%, having received 1 seat and a privilege to participate in the elections to the State Duma in 2021 without collecting signatures. Alexander Mikhailov was elected to the Legislative Assembly. However, the party did not manage to exercise its right, and a year later the court liquidated the party. Also, the party entered the Council of Deputies of the city of Monchegorsk, Murmansk Oblast, gaining 13.8% of the vote.
