= Legislative Assembly of Penza Oblast =

Regional parliament of Penza Oblast, Russia

Legislative Assembly of Penza Oblast Законодательное собрание Пензенской области
- 7th legislature

Type
- Type: Unicameral

Leadership
- Chairman: Vadim Supikov, United Russia since 21 September 2022

Structure
- Seats: 36
- Political groups: United Russia (32); CPRF (2); LDPR (2)

Elections
- Voting system: Mixed
- Last election: 11 September 2022
- Next election: 2027

Meeting place
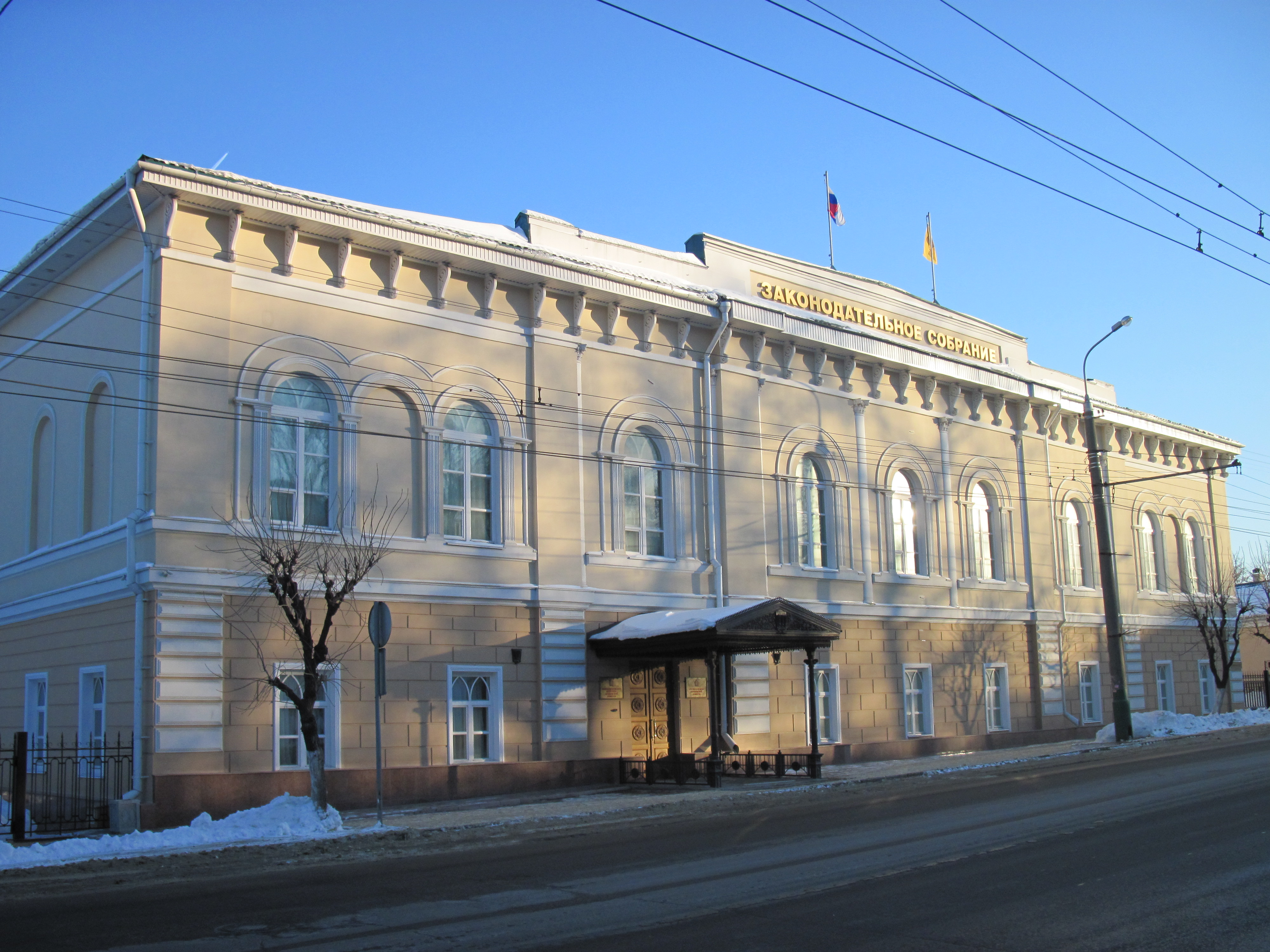
- 13 Kirova Street, Penza

Website
- www.zspo.ru

The Legislative Assembly of Penza Oblast (Russian: Законодательное собрание Пензенской области, romanized: Zakonodatel'noe sobranie Penzenskoy oblasti) is the regional parliament of Penza Oblast, a federal subject of Russia. The Legislative Assembly exercises its authority by passing laws, resolutions, and other legal acts and by supervising the implementation and observance of the laws and other legal acts passed by it.

The assembly consists of 36 deputies, each of whom is elected for a term of five years. 18 members are elected from single-member constituencies and 18 deputies - on party lists.

== Elections ==
=== 2017 ===
Party	%	Seats
United Russia	68.99	32
Communist Party of the Russian Federation	13.14	2
Liberal Democratic Party of Russia	7.01	1
A Just Russia	5.46	1
Party of Pensioners of Russia	1.34	0
Russian Ecological Party "The Greens"	0.69	0
Registered voters/turnout	50.96	

=== 2022 ===
Party	%	Seats
United Russia	74.91	32
Communist Party of the Russian Federation	8.53	2
Liberal Democratic Party of Russia	5.59	2
Russian Party of Pensioners for Social Justice	3.51	0
A Just Russia — For Truth	3.30	0
New People	2.88	0
Registered voters/turnout	50.95	
