= Oleg Melnichenko =

Russian politician

- Олег Мельниченко
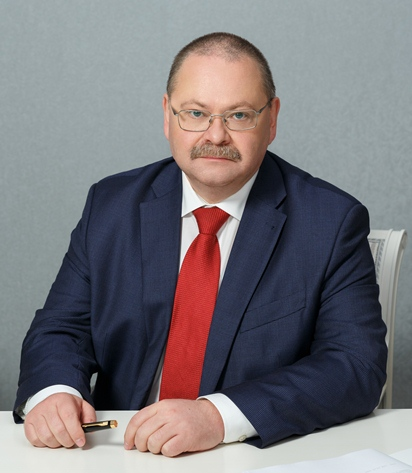
- Official portrait, 2021

Governor of Penza Oblast
- Incumbent
- Assumed office 26 March 2021
- Preceded by: Nikolay Simonov (acting)

Senator from Penza Oblast
- In office 26 September 2017 – 26 March 2021
- Preceded by: Viktor Kondrashin
- Succeeded by: Yulia Lazutkina

Personal details
- Born: 21 May 1973 (age 53) Penza, Penza Oblast, Russian SFSR, Soviet Union
- Party: United Russia

Oleg Vladimirovich Melnichenko (Russian: Олег Владимирович Мельниченко; born 21 May 1973) is a Russian statesman and a politician. Chairman of the Federation Council Committee on Federal Structure, Regional Policy, Local Self-Government and Northern Affairs. Member of the Presidium of the General Council of the United Russia Party. Chairman of the All-Russian public organization "All-Russian Council of Local Self-Government".

Acting Governor of Penza Oblast 26 March 2021.

== Biography ==
1990–1992 Military student at Leningrad Higher Political School named after the 60th anniversary of the Komsomol of the Interior Troops of the USSR Ministry of Internal Affairs, St. Petersburg

1992–1997 Student at V.G. Belinsky Penza State Pedagogical University, Penza.

1997–2001 Trainee teacher, assistant, senior teacher at the Faculty of History, V.G. Belinsky Penza State Pedagogical University

2001–2004 Deputy Head of the Zheleznodorozhny District Administration of Penza for Social Policy and Cooperation with Law Enforcement Agencies

2004–2006 Specialist expert of the Office of the Plenipotentiary Representative of the President of the Russian Federation in the Far Eastern Federal District

01.2006–11.2006 Head of the Public Relations Department of the Government of the Penza Region

11.2006–01.2007 Head of the Department for National Policy Issues, Relations with Public and Religious Associations of the Government of the Penza Region

01.2007–04.2007 Advisor to the Office of the Plenipotentiary Representative of the President of the Russian Federation in the Volga Federal District

04.2007–01.2008 Minister of Education and Science of the Penza Region

01.2008–06.2008 Vice Governor of the Penza Region

06.2008–03.2009 Deputy Chairman of the Government of the Penza Region

03.2009–04.2009 Deputy Prime Minister–Head of the Department for Information Policy and Mass Media of the Penza Region

04.2009–09.2013 Assistant to the Plenipotentiary Representative of the President of the Russian Federation in the Volga Federal District

09.2013–09.2017 Deputy Plenipotentiary Representative of the President of the Russian Federation in the Volga Federal District

Full State Counsellor 2nd Class of the Russian Federation. On 10 September 2017, he was elected a deputy of the Legislative Assembly of the Penza region of the sixth convocation from the Penza regional branch of the political party "United Russia".

Since 26 September 2017 he has been Senator of the Russian Federation, representative from the legislative (representative) body of state power of the Penza region. Chairman of the Federation Council Committee on Federal Structure, Regional Policy, Local Self-Government and Northern Affairs.

== Public and political activities ==
Since December 2017 he has been Member of the Presidium of the General Council of the All-Russian Political Party "United Russia"

Since December 2017 he has been Chairman of the All-Russian Council of Local Self-Government

Since May 2019–First Deputy Chairman of the Supreme Council of the All-Russian Association for the Development of Local Self-Government.

He is a member of the Presidium of the Council under the President of the Russian Federation for Interethnic Relations; the Presidium of the Council under the President of the Russian Federation for the Development of Local Self-Government; the Council under the President of the Russian Federation for Strategic Development and National Projects; the Commission under the Government of the Russian Federation for Regional Development; the Government Commission for the Development of Housing Construction and Efficiency Evaluation of land plots owned by the Russian Federation.

=== Acting Governor of the Penza Region ===
On 26 March 2021 President of Russia Vladimir Putin appointed Oleg Melnichenko Acting Governor of the Penza region, prior to taking office of the person elected governor of the Penza region.

In response to the Russian invasion of Ukraine, the Office of Foreign Assets Control of the United States Department of the Treasury added Melnichenko to the Specially Designated Nationals and Blocked Persons List on 24 February 2023, which results in his assets being frozen and U.S. persons being prohibited from dealing with him.

== Family ==
He is married and has a daughter.
