= Penza State University =

Russian university

- Пензенский государственный университет (ПГУ)
- Type: Public
- Established: 1943
- President: Vladimir Volchikhin
- Rector: Alexandr Gulyakov
- Location: Krasnaya 40 st, Penza, Russia; 53°10′54″N 45°0′13″E
- Campus: Urban
- Website: www.pnzgu.ru
- Building details
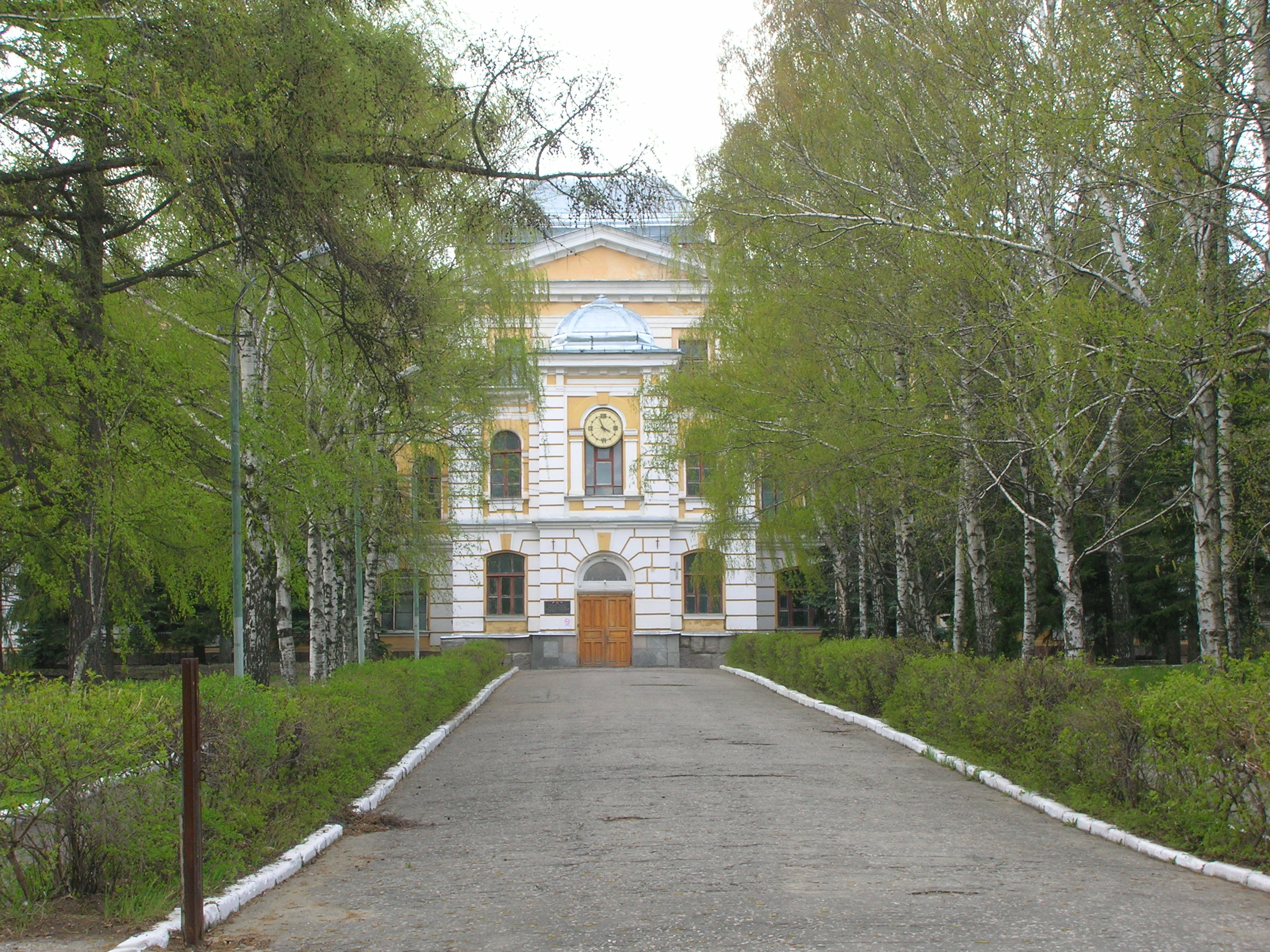

Penza State University (Russian: Пензенский государственный университет) is a state university in the city of Penza. It was founded in 1943. The university has nine faculties and five institutes.

== History ==
It was founded on the basis of the Odessa Industrial Institute, which was relocated to Penza by the Soviet government after the Axis occupation of Odessa in July of 1941. It was opened under the name "Penza Industrial Institute" on 1 November 1943 and had 11 departments.

In 1959 the Penza Industrial Institute was renamed to Penza Polytechnical Institute, by order of the Ministry of Higher Education of the USSR. At that time, the Faculty of Construction at Penza Civil Engineering Institute was also formed. On 5th July 1993, the Penza Polytechnical Institute was renamed into Penza State Technical University, by the order of the chairman of the higher education committee of the Russian federation. On 22 January 1998, the university got renamed again to Penza State University, by order of the minister of education of the Russian federation. On 23rd April 2012, the university became reorganised. They joined the Penza Pedagogical University named after Vissarion Belinsky as a structural unit. This happened by order of the ministry of education and science.

== Institutes ==
PSU includes the following institutes:

- Institute of Military Training
- Institute of Sport and Physical Training
- Medical Institute
- Institute of Ongoing Education
- V.G. Belinsky Institute of Teacher Education
- Polytechnic Institute
- Institute of Economics and Administration
- Institute of Law

== Faculties ==
PSU includes the following faculties:

- Faculty of Computer Engineering (Polytechnic Institute)
- Faculty of History, Languages and Literature
- Faculty of General Medicine
- Faculty of Industrial Technologies, Power Engineering and Transport (Polytechnic Institute)
- Faculty of Pedagogy, Psychology and Social Sciences
- Faculty of Information Technology and Electronics (Polytechnic Institute)
- Faculty of Dentistry
- Faculty of Physics, Mathematics and Natural Sciences

== Branches ==
PSU comprises the following branches:

- Kuznetsk Institute of Information and Management Technologies
- Nizhny Lomov branch
- Serdobsk branch

== Rectors ==
Since November 26, 2013 - Gulyakov Alexander Dmitrievich
