= Opinion polling for the 2026 Russian legislative election =

In the run up to the 2026 Russian legislative election, various organisations carried out opinion polling to gauge voting intention in Russia. The results of these polls are displayed in this article. Polls were conducted only for the 225 seats elected on the party list. Another 225 deputies are elected directly in single member constituencies, where the party can obtain a completely different result.

The date range for these opinion polls are from the 2021 Russian legislative election, held on 17–19 September, until mid-September 2026.

== Impact of state censorship and data restrictions ==
The reliability and accuracy of opinion polling have been a subject of significant debate among political analysts and international observers. Following the 2022 invasion of Ukraine, the Russian government introduced strict wartime censorship laws, including penalties for "discrediting" the armed forces, which critics argue heavily skews polling data due to respondent fear and preference falsification. In the spring of 2026, amid the run-up to the September parliamentary elections, independent media reported that the state-run Russian Public Opinion Research Center (VTsIOM) ceased the public release of its monthly "open-ended" trust poll for President Vladimir Putin after his rating in that specific metric dropped to 29.5% in April—its lowest level since the beginning of the war.

The "open-ended" method, where respondents must name politicians they trust without prompts, showed a stark contrast to "closed-ended" questions (where Putin's name is explicitly offered), which consistently yielded much higher results (around 73%). Furthermore, the polling environment in early 2026 was affected by mounting technical restrictions. Frustration among the electorate grew due to widespread government crackdowns on the mobile internet, messaging applications, and VPN services. While authorities defended these measures as necessary for national security, political bloggers and some politicians issued unusually public warnings that growing public dissatisfaction, combined with a declining baseline of support for the ruling United Russia party, could heighten the risk of regional unrest and necessitate substantially larger electoral manipulation ahead of the September vote.

== Graphical summary ==
=== Pre-campaign ===
All opinion polls. Up to 95% polling results of the graph are sourced from pollsters affiliated to the president Putin and the Presidential Administration, notably FOM and VCIOM United Russia CPRF LDPR A Just Russia New People

Graph of independent, opposition and alleged closed Kremlin opinion polls. Consists of 31 Levada Center, 9 Russian Field, 4 CIPKR, 3 ACF, 3 ExtremeScan and 2 alleged closed Kremlin-ordered polls. United Russia CPRF LDPR A Just Russia New People Yabloko RPPSJ BLP

== Exit polls ==
=== Federal exit polls ===
ExtremeScan: party named by day of voting
Voting day	UR	CPRF	LDPR	SR	NP	RPPSJ	Others	Lead
All (n=453) (Note: Telephone survey conducted by ExtremeScan on 18–20 Sep 2026: 1,640 respondents, of whom 980 had already voted and 453 of those named a party. The figures cover only the roughly half of voters who agreed to name a party and are not a forecast of the result.)	44.2	23.1	10.1	4.6	13.1	2.6	2.3	21.1
Friday, 18 Sep	55.5	15.8	8.9	4.9	11.1	2.3	1.5	39.7
Saturday, 19 Sep	46.0	16.7	13.0	6.0	12.5	4.2	1.6	29.3
Sunday, 20 Sep (Note: until the interview)	24.6	39.8	9.3	3.0	17.4	1.4	4.5	15.2

=== Electoral ratings ===
Fieldwork date	Polling firm	Affiliation	Response rate	Sample size	UR	CPRF	LDPR	SR	NP	RPPSJ	CR	Greens	Rodina	PPD	Invalid ballot	Lead
18–20 Sep	ExtremeScan	Independent	46.9%	980 (Note: Telephone survey conducted on the last day of voting: 1,640 respondents, of whom 980 had already voted. The results are given for those who had voted and include respondents who refused to name a party.)	20.3	10.6	4.6	2.1	6.0	1.2	1.1				0.8	9.7
18–20 Sep	ExtremeScan	Independent	46.9%	453 (Note: Of the 980 respondents who had already voted, 453 named a party. The results are given for these respondents only and are not a forecast of the result. Others: 2.3.)	44.2	23.1	10.1	4.6	13.1	2.6	2.3				–	21.1
18–20 Sep	WCIOM	Government	55.1%	266,354	49.4	14.2	10.7	6.6	9.7	3.3	2.1	1.1	1.0	0.4	–	35.2
18–20 Sep	INSOMAR	Government	64.4%	137,657	52.8	14.8	9.9	5.5	8.6	3.1	–				–	38

=== Exit polls abroad ===
Fieldwork date	Polling firm	Affiliation	Sample size	Country	UR	CPRF	LDPR	SR	NP	RPPSJ	CR	Greens	Rodina	PPD	Answer refusal	Invalid ballot	Ballot trashed or taken away	Lead
?	Vesna & Progress	Banned Liberal Opposition	2,227	Serbia	0.4	23.44	2.11	0.4	62.73	0.85	0.36	2.43	–	0.4	4.38	2.43	0.09	39.29
?	Vesna & Progress	Banned Liberal Opposition	1,567	Germany	2.23	16.59	2.11	0.7	36.69	1.15	0.64	2.49	0.13	0.51	31.78	3.77	1.21	20.1
?	Vesna & Progress	Banned Liberal Opposition	870	Czech Republic	1.38	18.74	3.45	0.35	49.54	1.03	1.03	2.76	0.23	0.69	17.70	2.87	0.23	30.8
?	Vesna & Progress	Banned Liberal Opposition	694	France	4.32	13.26	1.87	0.29	38.91	0.14	0.29	2.59	–	0.15	35.30	2.74	0.14	25.65
?	Vesna & Progress	Banned Liberal Opposition	593	South Korea	1.35	17.87	3.20	0.84	32.21	0.51	0.51	2.53	–	0.84	38.62	1.01	0.51	14.34
?	Vesna & Progress	Banned Liberal Opposition	584	Netherlands	0.69	18.49	1.03	0.51	56.85	0.34	–	1.71	0.17	0.17	15.93	4.11	–	38.36
?	Vesna & Progress	Banned Liberal Opposition	467	United States	4.71	14.78	1.71	1.07	35.55	1.29	1.71	3.85	0.21	1.07	30.84	2.14	1.07	20.77
?	Vesna & Progress	Banned Liberal Opposition	427	Armenia	5.62	27.17	0.70	0.23	55.74	0.94	0.23	1.17	0.24	0.23	5.62	2.11	–	28.57
?	Vesna & Progress	Banned Liberal Opposition	378	Argentina	0.26	20.37	1.85	0.27	46.03	0.26	0.53	4.23	–	0.53	22.49	3.18	–	25.66
?	Vesna & Progress	Banned Liberal Opposition	238	Lithuania	1.68	23.95	1.26	2.10	34.04	–	–	2.10	–	–	27.73	6.30	0.84	10.09
?	Vesna & Progress	Banned Liberal Opposition	228	Belgium	5.26	19.74	1.76	2.63	36.40	–	–	2.63	–	–	28.51	3.07	–	16.66
?	Vesna & Progress	Banned Liberal Opposition	224	Luxembourg	7.14	14.28	1.34	0.45	44.64	–	–	2.68	0.89	0.45	25.00	2.68	0.45	30.36
?	Vesna & Progress	Banned Liberal Opposition	198	Poland	1.51	22.22	2.53	1.01	50.00	0.50	–	1.52	–	–	14.65	5.56	0.50	27.78
?	Vesna & Progress	Banned Liberal Opposition	163	Norway	6.75	10.43	4.91	2.45	28.83	1.23	–	3.68	–	1.23	30.67	9.82	–	18.40
?	Vesna & Progress	Banned Liberal Opposition	149	Spain	–	22.15	–	–	54.36	0.67	–	4.70	–	1.34	14.77	2.01	–	32.21
?	Vesna & Progress	Banned Liberal Opposition	135	Austria	1.48	14.82	1.48	–	38.52	0.74	0.74	3.70	–	0.74	33.33	4.45	–	23.70
?	Vesna & Progress	Banned Liberal Opposition	105	Slovenia	1.91	12.38	1.91	–	56.19	0.95	–	0.95	–	0.95	20.00	4.76	–	43.81
?	Vote Abroad	Banned Liberal Opposition	519	Estonia	6.0	10.0	0.2	1.2	11.2	0.8	0.2	1.3	0.2	0.0	68.0	1.0	–	1.2

=== Regional exit polls ===
Fieldwork date	Polling firm / source	Affiliation	Sample size	Region	UR	CPRF	LDPR	SR	NP	RPPSJ	CR	Greens	Rodina	PPD	Answer refusal	Invalid ballot	Lead
18–20 Sep	CHRMCRB (Note: Center for Humanitarian Research of the Ministry of Culture of the Republic of Bashkortostan)	Government	150,000	Bashkortostan	62	9.6	8.7	7.8	8.0	0.8	0.8	0.8	0.8	–	35	–	52.4
18–20 Sep	Realnoye Vryemia	?	?	Tatarstan	71.7	11.2	4.3	2.4	6.7	0.6	0.5	0.8	0.3	0.4	–	~1	60.5
18–20 Sep	Novosti Yakutska	?	?	Sakha Republic	54.3	15.6	5.7	7.4	12.9	0.9	1.4	0.7	0.4	0.1	–	0.6	38.7
?	Kurs Dela	?	?	Chelyabinsk Oblast	48	8.8	12.1	15.2	10.8	–	–	–	–	–	40	–	32.8
?	Vesti Omsk (GTRK Irtysh)	Government	?	Omsk Oblast	41.6	12.4	7	2.5	7.5	2.2	1.4	0.4	0.2	0.1	24.3	0.5	29.2
18–20 Sep	URA.RU	?	?	Perm Krai	47	18	14	4	12	–	–	–	–	–	–	–	29
18–20 Sep	Mosaica.ru	?	?	Ulyanovsk Oblast	52	23	11	–	11	–	–	–	–	–	–	–	29
18–20 Sep	Chuvashinform (Sotsis)	?	?	Chuvashia	42	20	(Note: Range of 7–12%, exact breakdown not given, difference within margin of error)			~5	–	–	–	–	–	–	22
18–20 Sep	RBC (Note: City Information and Analytical Center)	Government	60,000	Saint Petersburg	57	9	12	3	10	–	–	5	–	–	42	1	45
~20 Sep	LenTV24	Government - Drozdenko	?	Leningrad Oblast	58	–	–	–	–	–	–	–	–	–	–	–	–
18–20 Sep	BARS (Note: Polistrategiya)	?	16,000	Ivanovo Oblast	55	15	12	5	8	–	–	–	–	–	33	–	40

=== Polls by Constituencies ===
Exit poll in Saint Petersburg published by Yabloko, constituency No. 218, 18–20 September 2026 (34 polling stations, 2,733 respondents)
Question	Sample size	UR	Yabloko	CPRF	LDPR	SR	NP	RPPSJ	CR	Greens	Rodina	PPD	Answer refusal	Invalid ballot	Lead
Vote results
Which party did you vote for in the State Duma election?	2,003	30.9	–	24.5	8.9	6.9	22.8	1.6	0.4	3.1	0.7	0.1	25.5	1.2	6.4
Which candidate did you vote for in the State Duma election?	1,646	25.6; Milonov	29.0; Khorzov	15.6; Ivliev	7.8; Malkov	5.6; Kubatyan	14.3; Suturina	–	–	2.0; Litvyak	–	–	39.1	0.7	3.4
Yabloko scenarios
Model scenario: if Yabloko were on the ballot (Note: A calculation, not a measurement. Assumes that all respondents who said "yes" to voting for Yabloko (807) would vote for it and the rest would vote as they did in the election.)	2,165	26.7	37.3	13.3	6.3	5.2	8.5	1.0	0.3	0.8	0.6	–	20.3	0.4	10.6
Which party did those who would vote for Yabloko actually vote for? (Note: Among the 807 respondents who said "yes" to voting for Yabloko. Refusal and invalid ballot shares are calculated from these 807; in the other rows, from all 2,733 respondents.)	645	6.2	–	31.6	6.5	4.0	42.5	1.7	0.2	7.1	–	0.2	17.3	2.7	10.9
Would you vote for Yabloko if it ran? (yes/no answers only)	2,117	Yes: 38.1% (807) · No: 61.9% (1,310)											8.0	–	–
Would you vote for Yabloko if it ran? (all answers)	2,733	Yes: 29.5% · No: 47.9% · Undecided: 14.6% (398) · Refused: 8.0% (218)											–	–	–
Respondent profile
Sex	2,733	Women: 62.06% (1,696) · Men: 37.94% (1,037)											–	–	–
Age	2,733	18–29: 17.71% (484) · 30–44: 22.98% (628) · 45–59: 22.54% (616) · 60+: 36.77% (1,005)											–	–	–

Fieldwork date	Polling firm / Source	Affiliation	Sample size	SMC	UR	CPRF	LDPR	SR	NP	RPPSJ	CR	Rodina	Self- nominated	Invalid ballot	Lead
20 Sep 2026	Po kom Zvonovsky	CPRF-Aligned	?	159	45; Fetisov	23; Leskin	8 Stepanov	4 Diyanchuk	12; Tomchuk	–	4 Selivanov	–	2 Mikulov	1	22
20 Sep 2026	Po kom Zvonovsky	CPRF-Aligned	?	160	34; Sakeev	29; Kalashnikov	13; Naydenov	6 Maryakhin	13; Motryukov	1 Perfilova	–	2 Barsuk	3 Ershov	–	5
20 Sep 2026	Po kom Zvonovsky	CPRF-Aligned	?	161	45; Portnyagin	31; Bobrova	9 Menshikh	2 Sazonov	13; Markarov	–	–	–	–	1	14
20 Sep 2026	Po kom Zvonovsky	CPRF-Aligned	?	162	56; Trifonov	19; Usov	9 Gutnik	4 Guseynov	11; Pukhaev	–	–	–	–	1	37
20 Sep 2026	Po kom Zvonovsky	CPRF-Aligned	?	163	35; Zhivaykin	43; Matveyev	9 Venediktov	4 Pletneva	–	3 Sarantseva	2 Minaev	–	–	4	8

== Forecast polls ==
Fieldwork date	Polling firm	Affiliation	Turnout	Sample size	UR	CPRF	LDPR	SR	NP	RPPSJ	CR	Greens	Rodina	PPD	Lead
4–6 Sep	FOM	Government	54	1,500	47-49	14-17	10-12	6-7	8-10	2-3	<1	1-2	1	<1	30
31–6 Sep	WCIOM	Government	51-53	1,600	51-53	13-15	9-11	4-6	9-11	2-5					36

== Campaign polls ==
Polls conducted after the election is called.

=== Electoral ratings ===
Fieldwork date	Polling firm	Affiliation	Sample size	UR	CPRF	LDPR	SR	NP	RPPSJ	Yabloko	CR	Greens	Rodina	PPD	Others	Undecided	Abstention	Lead
4-10 Sep	ExtremeScan	Independent	800	31.8 (Note: Among those who determined their choice with Yabloko on ballot)	16.6	8.6	4.1	10.3	1.8	24.6	0.5	0.5	1.2	0.0	–	–	–	7.2
4-10 Sep	ExtremeScan	Independent	800	35.6 (Note: Among those who have determined their choice)	23.9	11.0	5.9	16.2	2.8	–	0.7	2.2	1.3	0.4	–	–	–	11.7
4-10 Sep	ExtremeScan	Independent	800	23.9 (Note: Among all of the polled persons)	16.0	7.3	4.0	10.8	1.9	[18.0] (Note: "Would rather vote" for Yabloko)	0.5	1.4	0.9	0.3	5.7	19.3	8.1	5.9
4–6 Sep	FOM	Government	1,500	33	10	10	4	5	2	–	0	1	0	0	–	18	15	23
31 Aug – 6 Sep	WCIOM	Government	1,600	37.4	13.1	9.9	4.5	10.4	4.4							10.9	8.4	24.3
28–30 Aug	FOM	Government	1,500	33	9	11	3	4	2	–	0	1	1	0	–	20	15	22
24–30 Aug	WCIOM	Government	1,600	37.2	11.6	8.7	5.3	11.5	4.7							11.1	8.6	25.6
18-28 Aug	Levada Centre	Independent	1,600	34	10	9	5	5	1	5	1	1	0	1	1	21	–	24
21–23 Aug	FOM	Government	1,500	32	10	7	3	6	2	–	1	1	0	0	–	22	16	22
17–23 Aug	WCIOM	Government	1,600	39.2	11.7	9.7	4.1	10.8	4.1							10.5	8.6	27.5
14–16 Aug	FOM	Government	1,500	33	8	9	4	8	1	–	1	1	1	0	–	17	16	25
10–16 Aug	WCIOM	Government	1,600	36.0	11.4	10.1	3.8	10.4	6.3							10.8	9.5	24.6
10 Aug	Supreme Court of Russia disqualifies Yabloko from party-list competition.																	
7–9 Aug	FOM	Government	1,500	37	11	11	4	5	1	4	0	1	0	0	–	14	10	26
3–8 Aug	WCIOM	Government	1,600	34.0	12.3	10.1	4.8	8.7	12.7							9.2	7.2	21.7
31 Jul – 2 Aug	FOM	Government	1,500	35	9	10	4	8	1	2	0	1	0	0	–	14	13	25
27 Jul – 2 Aug	WCIOM	Government	1,600	32.1	10.4	9.3	5.8	8.6	10.3							13.7	8.7	21,7
24–26 Jul	FOM	Government	1,500	35	10	10	4	6	2	2	1	1	1	0	–	15	14	25
July	Ukrainian Armed Forces isolation of Crimea causes humanitarian crisis in the region																	
20–26 Jul	WCIOM	Government	1,600	33.5	9.7	8.0	6.0	9.5	9.2							14.7	8.4	23.8
18 Jul	Beginning of the series of Ukrainian strikes on Wildberries warehouses																	
17–19 Jul	FOM	Government	1,500	33	11	11	3	7	2	1	0	1	1	0	–	17	12	22
13–19 Jul	WCIOM	Government	1,600	32.7	11.9	9.6	5.4	10.5	10.0							12.8	7.1	20.8
Jul	ExtremeScan	Independent	–	24	13	8	-	11	-	4	-					-	-	11
10–12 Jul	FOM	Government	1,500	36	11	9	4	7	1	2	1	1	0	0	–	18	9	25
6–12 Jul	WCIOM	Government	1,600	35.3	10.1	8.2	4.0	10.7	10.0							13.1	7.6	24.6
3–5 Jul	FOM	Government	1,500	35	9	11	3	7	2	1	0	1	0	0	–	17	12	24
29 Jun – 5 Jul	WCIOM	Government	1,600	34.6	10.3	10.4	5.4	11.5	7.3							11.2	8.7	23.1
26–28 Jun	FOM	Government	1,500	37	8	10	3	7	2	1	1	0	0	0	–	17	12	27
22–28 Jun	WCIOM	Government	1,600	32.6	11.3	9.0	5.4	11.5	5.6							13.3	10.3	21.1
Jun	Sharp worsening of Russian fuel crisis																	
19–21 Jun	FOM	Government	1,500	35	9	10	3	7	2	1	1	1	0	0	–	15	13	25
Jun	ACF Sociology	ACF - Banned Liberal Opposition	–	18	8	6	3	8	-	1	11					24	23	10
15–21 Jun	WCIOM	Government	1,600	33.8	10.7	9.4	5.7	12.0	7.0							12.6	8.1	21.8
17–19 Sep 2021	Election result			49.82	18.93	7.55	7.46	5.84 (Note: New People – 5.32, Party of Growth – 0.52)	2.45	1.34	1.27	1.55 (Note: The Greens – 0.91, Green Alternative – 0.64)	0.80	–	0.92 (Note: Russian Party of Freedom and Justice – 0.77 Civic Platform – 0.15)		(48.28)	30.89

=== Alleged nationwide closed Kremlin polls ===
Closed Kremlin opinion polls are classified public opinion surveys conducted on behalf of the Russian government, specifically the Presidential Administration of Russia (the Kremlin). These polls are intended exclusively for the country's top leadership and are used to assess actual public sentiment, monitor protest potential, and inform key political decisions. Closed polling utilizes different methodologies and much larger sample sizes to gauge the true state of society.

Fieldwork date	Source	Polling firm	Sample size	UR	CPRF	LDPR	SR	NP	RPPSJ	Yabloko	CR	Greens	Rodina	PPD	Others	Undecided	Abstention	Lead
End of Jul	Nezavisimaya Gazeta	Unknown	?	?	?	?	?	?		9,38	?					?	?	?
End of Jul	Meduza	FOM	?	?	?	?	?	?		5,5	?					?	?	?

=== Miscellaneous polls ===
Which party would best handle problems in the following areas? (Russian Field, 24–31 July 2026, telephone survey, 1,600 respondents)
Policy area	UR	CPRF	LDPR	SR	NP	Yabloko	Communists (unspecified)	Other	Any party	None	Undecided	Lead
Fighting crime	21	14	9	3	4	4	0.6	1.4	0.2	16	28	7
Defense	27	12	6	1.5	4	3	0.6	1.4	0.3	15	29	15
Economy	21	12	5	3	6	5	0.7	1.5	0.2	17	28	9
Foreign policy	28	10	6	2	5	5	0.5	2	0.1	16	27	18
Education	18	16	6	3	8	4	0.6	2	0.2	17	27	2
Healthcare	19	16	4	4	6	4	0.6	1.5	0.2	17	28	3
Migration policy	18	12	10	2	5	4	0.3	1.2	0.4	14	32	6

Which parties' results of work have you personally noticed in your daily life recently – in your locality, district, workplace or public places? (Russian Field, 24–31 July 2026, telephone survey, 1,600 respondents; multiple answers allowed)
Group	UR	CPRF	LDPR	SR	NP	Yabloko	RPPSJ	CR	Communists (unspecified)	Other	None noticed	Undecided	Lead
Overall	35	8	8	4	5	0.2	0.2	0.1	0.1	0.7	41	14	27
By type of settlement
Moscow	32	4	5	3	7	–	–	–	–	–	47	13	25
Saint Petersburg (Note: Small sample; the data are indicative only.)	36	5	8	3	8	–	–	–	–	–	45	10	28
Large-medium cities (Note: (Excludes capitals))	37	9	7	4	6	–	–	–	–	–	38	13	28
Small towns, urban-type settlements and villages	34	7	9	4	3	–	–	–	–	–	41	16	25
By age
18–29	30	8	7	2	16	–	–	–	–	–	37	16	14
30–44	38	7	8	3	6	–	–	–	–	–	41	11	30
45–59	41	7	10	5	3	–	–	–	–	–	40	11	31
60+	30	9	7	4	1	–	–	–	–	–	42	19	21
By party preference
United Russia	56	5	8	2	2	–	–	–	–	–	25	15	48
CPRF	30	22	8	3	1	–	–	–	–	–	42	13	8
LDPR	33	7	16	2	3	–	–	–	–	–	36	20	17
New People	33	6	11	3	21	–	–	–	–	–	37	12	12
A Just Russia	29	5	9	21	2	–	–	–	–	–	45	15	8
Yabloko	35	5	3	3	8	–	–	–	–	–	47	9	27
None / will not vote	16	2	4	1	3	–	–	–	–	–	63	12	12

To what extent do you agree with the following statements? (1–5 scale; Russian Field, 24–31 July 2026, telephone survey, 1,600 respondents)
Answer	Overall	Party preference							
Answer	Overall	UR	CPRF	LDPR	SR	NP	Yabloko	None / will not vote	Undecided on party
“People who are members of parties are ordinary people like me”
Disagree (1–2)	49	30	56	50	47	57	60	65	38
Partly agree, partly disagree (3)	16	19	12	19	19	20	13	12	18
Agree (4–5)	29	46	26	26	28	20	25	14	36
Mean	2.6	–	–	–	–	–	–	–	–
Median	2.0	–	–	–	–	–	–	–	–
“Parties try to represent the interests of their supporters, not only of those who finance them”
Disagree (1–2)	48	26	57	40	45	56	72	65	31
Partly agree, partly disagree (3)	21	23	17	33	27	17	12	17	24
Agree (4–5)	21	38	16	19	21	20	13	9	18
Mean	2.5	–	–	–	–	–	–	–	–
Median	2.0	–	–	–	–	–	–	–	–

Do your party preferences rather coincide or rather not coincide with the preferences of most of your family members? (Russian Field, 24–31 July 2026, telephone survey, 1,600 respondents)
Answer	Overall (Note: Have no family – 4%; undecided or refused – 16%)	Age				Party preference						
Answer	Overall	18–29	30–44	45–59	60+	UR	CPRF	LDPR	SR	NP	Yabloko	None / will not vote
Rather coincide	61	67	65	64	54	73	66	56	49	63	69	52
Rather do not coincide	19	20	17	20	19	11	14	26	29	22	18	21

Do you think there are too many, too few or about as many political parties in Russia today as needed? (Russian Field, 24–31 July 2026, telephone survey, 1,600 respondents)
Answer	Overall (Note: Undecided or refused – 11%)	Type of settlement				Age				Party preference							
Answer	Overall	Moscow	Saint Petersburg (Note: Small sample; the data are indicative only.)	Large-medium cities (Note: (excl. Moscow and Saint Petersburg))	Small towns, urban-type settlements and villages	18–29	30–44	45–59	60+	UR	CPRF	LDPR	SR	NP	Yabloko	None / will not vote	Undecided on party
Too many	38	17	25	37	46	19	35	41	49	40	47	45	47	29	11	49	28
About as many as needed	34	34	32	35	33	43	33	32	32	48	29	33	41	36	22	19	39
Too few	16	34	33	17	10	30	21	12	7	2	16	8	6	27	59	15	8

In the United States there is the concept of the “American dream”, denoting a set of life goals widespread in that country. What would you personally call the “Russian dream”? (Open-ended question; Russian Field, 18–26 June 2026, telephone survey, 1,600 respondents)
Answer	Overall (Note: One answer could be assigned to several categories, so the shares do not add up to 100%.)	Sex		Age				Party preference				
Answer	Overall	Men	Women	18–29	30–44	45–59	60+	UR	CPRF	LDPR	SR	NP
Peace, peaceful sky, security	21	13	28	7	21	23	27	30	20	24	26	14
Material prosperity, income, affordable prices	21	21	21	23	22	19	20	15	27	24	21	23
Personal happiness, self-realization, travel, good life	20	18	21	16	19	20	24	22	20	23	20	22
Family, children, loved ones	13	13	13	15	13	13	11	16	11	11	14	19
Rights, freedoms, renewal of power, fair governance	12	13	11	10	14	14	10	7	16	9	15	10
Stability, order, confidence in the future	10	11	9	14	12	9	7	9	12	12	8	12
Own housing, home, solving the housing issue	10	11	9	18	12	7	6	6	12	9	11	18
Social justice, equality, absence of corruption	8	10	7	3	9	8	10	3	14	7	11	7
Strong, developed, sovereign Russia; national unity	7	9	6	7	8	7	7	9	8	5	8	5
Good job, profession, own business	6	6	6	8	7	5	5	4	7	4	7	7
Health and accessible healthcare	6	5	7	3	6	6	7	8	5	6	6	6
Quality education, science, culture	3	–	–	–	–	–	–	–	–	–	–	–
Kindness, mutual help, respect between people	3	–	–	–	–	–	–	–	–	–	–	–
No dream / nothing / do not believe in the possibility	1	–	–	–	–	–	–	–	–	–	–	–
Comfortable environment, infrastructure, ecology	1	–	–	–	–	–	–	–	–	–	–	–
Soviet / socialist project, return of the USSR	0.5	–	–	–	–	–	–	–	–	–	–	–
Other	0.4	–	–	–	–	–	–	–	–	–	–	–
Undecided	17	18	17	23	18	17	15	20	11	18	14	18
Refused	1	–	–	–	–	–	–	–	–	–	–	–

To which party do the following descriptions apply most? (Russian Field, 18–26 June 2026, telephone survey, 1,600 respondents; multiple answers allowed)
Description	UR	CPRF	LDPR	SR	NP	Yabloko	RPPSJ	Other party	All parties	None	Undecided	Refused	Lead
Introduces the most initiatives on various bans	46	7	7	4	2	1	0.3	0.5	2	4	38	1	39
Defends the interests of ordinary people, not officials and oligarchs	10	17	11	6	7	2	0.9	1	1	25	30	1	6
Most actively defends citizens' digital rights, protests against blocks and restrictions on the Internet	9	9	5	5	15	2	0	1	1	16	46	1	6

== Pre-campaign polls ==
Opinion polls conducted prior to the campaign and the announcement of the list of participating parties. Parties with more than 5% support of the whole electorate (enough to enter State Duma while not adjusting for likely voters) are given in bold. When a specific poll does not show a data figure for a party, the party's cell corresponding to that poll is shown empty.

Polling firms that tend to inflate electoral rating of United Russia are colored in gray. Polling firms affiliated with Russian liberal opposition are colored in cyan. WCIOM and FOM firms are known for their connection to president Vladimir Putin and Presidential Administration of Russia with latter often inflating electoral rating of United Russia for the upcoming election.

=== Electoral ratings ===
Fieldwork date	Polling firm	Affiliation	Sample size	UR	CPRF	LDPR	SR	NP	RPPSJ	Yabloko	CR	Greens	Rodina	CP	PPD	Others	Undecided	Abstention	Lead
12–14 Jun	FOM	Government	1,500	38	**9**	12	4	**8**	2	1	0	1	0	–	0	–	15	9	26
8–14 Jun	WCIOM	Government	1,600	35.5	**10.9**	9.4	**5.8**	**9.8**	6.3								11.7	9.6	24.6
5–7 Jun	FOM	Government	1,500	36	**8**	12	3	**6**	1	1	0	2	0	–	0	–	15	13	24
1–7 Jun	WCIOM	Government	1,600	34.9	**10.8**	10.5	**5.2**	**9.6**	9.1								10.8	8	24.1
29–31 May	FOM	Government	1,500	38	**9**	8	3	**7**	1	1	0	1	0	–	0	–	17	12	29
25–31 May	WCIOM	Government	1,600	32.0	**10.1**	11.7	**6.1**	**10.0**	8.8								11.9	8.5	20.3
20–28 May	Levada Center	Independent, recognized foreign agent	1,607	30	**9**	10	4	**5**	42										20
22–24 May	FOM	Government	1,500	36	**9**	10	3	**6**	1	1	1	1	1	–	0	–	18	13	26
18–24 May	WCIOM	Government	1,600	32.7	**10.9**	8.5	**5.7**	**11.5**	8.0								13.4	8.4	21.8
15–17 May	FOM	Government	1,500	39	**10**	11	4	**5**	1	1	1	1	0	0	0	–	18	8	28
11–17 May	WCIOM	Government	1,600	33.1	**11.7**	9.7	4.4	**11.7**	7.4								13.7	6.7	21.4
4–10 May	WCIOM	Government	–	31.2	**11.9**	11.6	4.2	**9.1**	7.7								13.3	9.6	19.3
10 May	Presidential-affiliated polling firm WCIOM changes polling methods over falling ratings of United Russia																		
1–3 May	FOM	Government	1,500	39	**8**	11	4	**6**	2	1	1	1	0	0	0	–	14	13	28
Apr	ACF Sociology	ACF - Banned Liberal Opposition	–	16.4	4.8	7.4	2.9	**6.0**	–	1.7	8.4						28.5	15.5	9.0
30 Apr	Supreme Court of Russia suspends Civic Platform.																		
26 Apr	Green Alternative merges with The Greens.																		
24–26 Apr	FOM	Government	1,500	37	**9**	10	3	**6**	1	1	1	1	1	0	0	–	16	13	27
17–19 Apr	FOM	Government	1,500	39	**8**	10	4	**6**	2	1	1	1	0	0	0	–	19	7	29
16 Apr	Tuapse environmental disaster																		
13–19 Apr	WCIOM	Government	11,200	27.7	**10.9**	10.1	**5.4**	**13.4**	10.3								10.6	10.3	14.9
10–12 Apr	FOM	Government	1,500	37	**8**	11	2	**6**	1	1	1	1	1	0	0	–	18	12	26
6–12 Apr	WCIOM	Government	11,200	27.3	**10.9**	10.8	**5.2**	**12.4**	9.9								10.6	11.3	14.9
3–5 Apr	FOM	Government	1,500	35	**7**	10	4	**5**	1	1	0	1	0	0	0	–	20	13	25
30 Mar – 5 Apr	WCIOM	Government	11,200	29.7	**10.3**	10.5	4.9	**12.3**	8.8								11.3	11.0	17.4
27–29 Mar	FOM	Government	1,500	38	**8**	9	3	**6**	1	1	1	1	1	0	0	–	18	12	29
23–29 Mar	WCIOM	Government	11,200	30.3	**9.8**	10.5	**5.3**	**10.8**	9.2								11.5	11.7	19.5
20–22 Mar	FOM	Government	1,500	41	**8**	10	4	**5**	2	1	0	1	1	0	0	–	18	8	31
19–22 Mar	WCIOM	Government	6,400	29.3	**9.7**	10.7	**5.8**	**10.4**	10.6								10.2	11.9	18.6
15 Mar	Telegram is being blocked in Russia.																		
13–15 Mar	FOM	Government	1,500	39	**8**	10	3	**5**	1	1	1	1	0	0	0	–	19	12	29
9–15 Mar	WCIOM	Government	11,200	30.6	**9.2**	9.7	**5.3**	**10.7**	9.6								10.8	12.6	19.9
6–8 Mar	FOM	Government	1,500	38	**7**	9	3	**6**	2	1	1	1	0	0	0	–	18	13	29
6 Mar	Mobile internet gets turned off in Moscow first time																		
2–7 Mar	WCIOM	Government	9,600	32.1	**9.3**	10.1	**5.4**	**9.5**	8.7								11.4	12.0	22.0
Early March	Mass slaughter of cattle in Russia.																		
27 Feb – 1 Mar	FOM	Government	1,500	36	**8**	9	4	**5**	1	1	0	1	0	0	0	–	19	14	27
23 Feb – 1 Mar	WCIOM	Government	11,200	31.8	**10.1**	10.2	**6.1**	**9.1**	8.9								11.6	11.1	21.6
18–25 Feb	Levada Center	Independent, recognized foreign agent	1,625	36	**10**	9	**5**	4	36										26
20–22 Feb	FOM	Government	1,500	40	**10**	9	4	**5**	1	1	1	1	0	0	0	–	17	10	30
16–22 Feb	WCIOM	Government	11,200	32.6	**9.8**	9.8	**5.3**	**9.4**	9.1								11.6	11.4	22.8
13–15 Feb	FOM	Government	1,500	39	**8**	10	4	**5**	1	1	1	1	0	0	0	–	16	13	29
9–15 Feb	WCIOM	Government	11,200	32.7	**9.6**	10.6	**5.2**	**8.7**	9.0								11.0	11.9	22.1
6–8 Feb	FOM	Government	1,500	40	**10**	8	3	4	1	1	1	1	0	0	0	–	18	12	30
2–8 Feb	WCIOM	Government	11,200	33.8	**9.2**	10.0	**5.3**	**8.4**	9.3								11.0	11.7	23.8
30 Jan – 1 Feb	FOM	Government	1,500	43	**9**	9	3	4	1	1	0	1	1	0	0	–	17	10	34
Late January	Russian Armed Forces capture Pokrovsk																		
26 Jan – 1 Feb	WCIOM	Government	11,200	33.5	**9.8**	10.5	4.7	**8.7**	9.4								11.8	10.6	23.0
23–25 Jan	FOM	Government	1,500	42	**7**	9	3	4	1	1	0	1	0	0	–	0 (Note: Russian Party of Freedom and Justice – 0, Green Alternative – 0)	22	9	33
19–25 Jan	WCIOM	Government	11,200	34.8	**8.8**	10.0	**5.2**	**8.1**	9.3								10.2	12.6	24.8
16–18 Jan	FOM	Government	1,500	41	**8**	10	3	4	1	1	0	1	0	0	–	1 (Note: Russian Party of Freedom and Justice – 1, Green Alternative – 0)	15	14	31
12–18 Jan	WCIOM	Government	11,200	33.8	**8.8**	10.4	**5.0**	**7.8**	9.1								10.8	12.8	23.4
17–19 Sep 2021	Election result			49.82	**18.93**	7.55	**7.46**	**5.84**	2.45	1.34	1.27	1.55	0.80	0.15	–	0.77 (Note: Russian Party of Freedom and Justice – 0.77)		(48.28)	30.89

=== Miscellaneous polls ===
Would you rather support or rather not support the adoption in Russia of a law providing punishment for domestic violence? (Russian Field, 13–20 May 2026, telephone survey, 1,605 respondents)
Answer	Overall	Sex		Party preference					
Answer	Overall	Men	Women	UR	CPRF	LDPR	SR (Note: Small sample; the data are approximate.)	NP	Yabloko
Rather support	**90**	**83**	**95**	**90**	**87**	**92**	**93**	**96**	**92**
Rather not support	6	13	1	7	9	6	2	2	5
Undecided / refused	4	–	–	–	–	–	–	–	–

Are the problems raised in New People's “Manifesto of Russian Women” relevant in modern Russia? (Note: The initiative proposes measures to protect women from violence, pressure on family-life issues and discrimination at work and in public life.) (Russian Field, 13–20 May 2026, telephone survey, 1,605 respondents)
Answer	Overall	Sex		Age				Party preference					
Answer	Overall	Men	Women	18–29	30–44	45–59	60+	UR	CPRF	LDPR	SR (Note: Small sample; the data are approximate.)	NP	Yabloko
Relevant	**69**	**56**	**80**	**79**	**68**	**67**	**67**	**72**	**62**	**67**	**63**	**83**	**74**
Definitely relevant	35	–	–	–	–	–	–	–	–	–	–	–	–
Rather relevant	34	–	–	–	–	–	–	–	–	–	–	–	–
Not relevant	25	37	15	19	26	27	26	23	35	25	33	15	26
Rather not relevant	16	–	–	–	–	–	–	–	–	–	–	–	–
Definitely not relevant	9	–	–	–	–	–	–	–	–	–	–	–	–
Undecided / refused	6	–	–	–	–	–	–	–	–	–	–	–	–

=== 2025 ===
Fieldwork date	Polling firm	Affiliation	Sample size	UR	CPRF	LDPR	SR (Note: A Just Russia – For Truth (SRZP) until 25 October 2025)	NP	RPPSJ	BLP	Yabloko	CR	Greens	Rodina	RPFJ	GA	CP	Others	Undecided	Abstention	Lead
22–28 Dec	WCIOM	Government	11,200	**33.9**	**9.4**	**10.3**	**5.0**	**8.1**	9.5										10.6	11.8	23.6
19–22 Dec	FOM	Government	1,500	**41**	**8**	**10**	4	4	1	–	1	0	1	0	0	0	0	–	17	12	31
15–21 Dec	WCIOM	Government	11,200	**35.2**	**8.8**	**10.7**	**5.4**	**7.7**	9.0										10.2	11.8	24.5
12–14 Dec	FOM	Government	1,500	**42**	**8**	**10**	4	4	1	–	1	1	1	0	0	0	0	–	16	12	32
8–14 Dec	WCIOM	Government	11,200	**36.0**	**9.1**	**10.2**	**5.4**	**8.2**	8.3										10.2	11.4	25.8
5–7 Dec	FOM	Government	1,500	**41**	**8**	**11**	3	4	1	–	1	1	1	0	0	0	0	–	16	12	30
1–7 Dec	WCIOM	Government	11,200	**34.3**	**9.2**	**10.2**	**5.6**	**8.3**	8.9										11.2	11.2	24.1
28–30 Nov	FOM	Government	1,500	**41**	**9**	**10**	4	4	1	–	1	0	1	1	0	0	0	–	18	8	31
24–30 Nov	WCIOM	Government	11,200	**34.1**	**9.5**	**10.5**	**5.1**	**8.4**	8.8										9.9	12.5	23.6
18–27 Nov	Levada Center	Independent, recognized foreign agent	1,608	**37**	**9**	**9**	4	**5**	36												28
21–23 Nov	FOM	Government	1,500	**40**	**8**	**10**	4	4	2	–	1	0	1	0	0	0	0	–	17	12	30
17–23 Nov	WCIOM	Government	11,200	**33.5**	**10.0**	**10.2**	4.3	**8.3**	9.8										9.6	13.1	23.3
Autumn 2025	Russian real estate crisis																				
14–16 Nov	FOM	Government	1,500	**39**	**8**	**9**	3	4	1	–	1	0	1	0	0	0	0	–	18	14	30
10–16 Nov	WCIOM	Government	11,200	**34.2**	**9.1**	**10.6**	4.3	**8.3**	9.0										10.0	13.3	23.6
7–9 Nov	FOM	Government	1,500	**40**	**8**	**10**	3	3	1	–	0	1	1	0	0	0	0	–	16	15	30
3–9 Nov	WCIOM	Government	11,200	**33.7**	**9.9**	**10.4**	4.5	**7.8**	9.3										9.4	13.5	23.3
31 Oct – 2 Nov	FOM	Government	1,500	**43**	**8**	**8**	3	4	1	–	1	1	1	0	0	0	0	–	18	10	35
27 Oct – 2 Nov	WCIOM	Government	11,200	**32.5**	**9.8**	**10.4**	4.9	**8.4**	9.7										10.0	12.7	22.1
Oct	ACF Sociology	ACF - Banned Liberal Opposition	–	**23.0**	**5.3**	**6.9**	1.4	4.2	–	–	0.6	2.3							32.4	17.8	16.1
24–26 Oct	FOM	Government	1,500	**42**	**8**	**10**	3	4	1	–	1	1	0	0	0	0	0	–	16	13	32
20–26 Oct	WCIOM	Government	11,200	**32.9**	**9.8**	**11.3**	4.1	**8.0**	9.5										9.6	13.3	21.6
22 Oct	Cancellation of Budapest Summit over Putins's refusal to back down from maximalist claims on Ukraine																				
17–19 Oct	FOM	Government	1,500	**41**	**9**	**10**	3	3	1	–	0	0	1	0	0	0	0	–	18	12	31
13–19 Oct	WCIOM	Government	11,200	**33.6**	**10.1**	**11.4**	4.5	**7.6**	9.4										9.5	12.6	22.2
10–12 Oct	FOM	Government	1,500	**41**	**8**	**11**	3	3	1	–	1	0	1	0	0	0	0	–	16	13	30
6–12 Oct	WCIOM	Government	11,200	**33.5**	**10.0**	**11.8**	4.0	**7.8**	9.6										9.0	13.0	21.7
3–5 Oct	FOM	Government	1,500	**43**	**9**	**10**	3	3	1	–	1	1	1	1	0	1	0	–	18	9	33
29 Sep – 5 Oct	WCIOM	Government	11,200	**33.8**	**10.1**	**11.2**	4.3	**8.2**	9.3										9.2	12.8	22.6
26–28 Sep	FOM	Government	1,500	**41**	**7**	**12**	3	4	1	–	1	0	1	0	0	0	0	–	17	11	29
22–28 Sep	WCIOM	Government	11,200	**34.4**	**9.7**	**10.9**	3.6	**8.6**	9.3										9.3	12.8	23.5
19–21 Sep	FOM	Government	1,500	**43**	**7**	**10**	3	4	1	–	1	0	1	1	0	0	0	–	14	14	33
15–21 Sep	WCIOM	Government	11,200	**34.8**	**9.4**	**10.9**	4.2	**8.0**	9.5										9.8	12.2	23.9
12–14 Sep	FOM	Government	1,500	**41**	**8**	**10**	3	3	1	–	1	1	1	0	0	0	0	–	17	13	31
9 Sept	Russian drone incursion into Poland																				
8–14 Sep	WCIOM	Government	11,200	**33.0**	**10.2**	**10.5**	4.1	**8.3**	9.4										10.2	12.8	22.5
5–7 Sep	FOM	Government	1,500	**44**	**9**	**9**	4	4	2	–	1	1	1	0	0	0	0	–	16	9	35
Aug	Beginning of fuel crisis in Russia																				
1–7 Sep	WCIOM	Government	11,200	**34.6**	**9.8**	**10.9**	3.8	**7.1**	9.2										10.7	12.4	23.7
29–31 Aug	FOM	Government	1,500	**43**	**8**	**10**	2	4	1	–	1	1	1	0	0	0	0	–	15	12	33
25–31 Aug	WCIOM	Government	11,200	**34.1**	**9.6**	**10.9**	3.9	**7.1**	9.2										10.5	13.4	23.2
19–27 Aug	Levada Center	Independent, recognized foreign agent	1,613	**41**	**11**	**10**	2	4	32												30
22–24 Aug	FOM	Government	1,500	**43**	**7**	**9**	4	3	1	–	1	0	1	1	0	0	0	–	17	12	34
18–24 Aug	WCIOM	Government	11,200	**34.2**	**9.4**	**11.0**	3.7	**7.6**	9.7										10.4	12.5	23.2
15–17 Aug	FOM	Government	1,500	**42**	**7**	**9**	3	4	1	–	1	0	1	1	0	0	0	–	18	12	33
15 Aug	Trump–Putin Summit in Alaska																				
11–17 Aug	WCIOM	Government	11,200	**34.7**	**9.3**	**10.5**	4.2	**7.8**	9.7										10.1	12.3	24.2
8–10 Aug	FOM	Government	1,500	**43**	**8**	**11**	4	4	1	–	1	1	1	0	0	0	0	–	17	8	32
4–10 Aug	WCIOM	Government	11,200	**32.8**	**9.9**	**10.9**	3.7	**7.8**	9.9										10.6	12.7	21.9
1–3 Aug	FOM	Government	1,500	**40**	**9**	**10**	2	3	1	–	1	0	1	1	0	1	0	–	17	14	30
28 Jul – 3 Aug	WCIOM	Government	11,200	**33.6**	**10.1**	**10.5**	3.8	**7.8**	10.5										9.7	12.5	23.1
25–27 Jul	FOM	Government	1,500	**42**	**8**	**10**	4	4	1	–	1	0	1	0	0	0	0	–	15	14	32
21–27 Jul	WCIOM	Government	11,200	**33.7**	**9.5**	**10.3**	4.0	**7.5**	9.3										10.9	13.1	23.4
18–20 Jul	FOM	Government	1,500	**39**	**8**	**11**	4	2	1	–	1	0	1	0	0	0	0	–	17	13	28
14–20 Jul	WCIOM	Government	11,200	**33.1**	**9.6**	**10.9**	4.1	**7.1**	9.9										10.5	13.1	22.2
11–13 Jul	FOM	Government	1,500	**43**	**8**	**9**	3	4	1	–	1	0	1	0	0	0	0	–	19	9	34
7–13 Jul	WCIOM	Government	11,200	**33.3**	**10.2**	**11.1**	3.9	**6.2**	10.4										10.4	12.8	22.2
4–6 Jul	FOM	Government	1,500	**43**	**9**	**11**	3	3	1	–	1	1	1	0	0	0	0	–	16	10	32
30 Jun – 6 Jul	WCIOM	Government	11,200	**33.1**	**9.7**	**11.7**	3.8	**6.5**	10.7										10.1	12.8	21.4
27–29 Jun	FOM	Government	1,500	**42**	**8**	**11**	3	3	1	–	0	0	1	0	0	0	0	–	18	10	31
23–29 Jun	WCIOM	Government	11,200	**34.5**	**9.7**	**11.2**	3.5	**6.4**	10.6										9.7	12.9	23.3
20–22 Jun	FOM	Government	1,500	**47**	**8**	**9**	3	3	1	–	1	0	1	0	0	0	0	–	16	11	38
16–22 Jun	WCIOM	Government	11,200	**35.3**	**9.6**	**10.8**	4.1	**5.8**	10.2										9.9	12.8	24.5
13–15 Jun	FOM	Government	1,500	**46**	**8**	**10**	3	3	1	–	1	0	1	1	0	0	0	–	16	9	36
9–15 Jun	WCIOM	Government	11,200	**35.6**	**9.4**	**11.6**	4.0	**6.0**	10.0										10.2	12.0	24.0
6–8 Jun	FOM	Government	1,500	**45**	**8**	**10**	3	3	1	–	1	0	1	0	1	0	0	–	15	12	35
2–8 Jun	WCIOM	Government	11,200	**34.2**	**9.8**	**11.7**	4.0	**6.6**	10.2										10.3	11.8	22.5
1 Jun	SBU successfully executes Operation Spiderweb attacking bombers capable of bearing nuclear weapons deep inside Russia																				
30 May – 1 Jun	FOM	Government	1,500	**43**	**7**	**9**	3	4	2	–	1	0	1	1	0	0	0	–	17	12	34
26 May – 1 Jun	WCIOM	Government	11,200	**35.1**	**9.3**	**11.6**	4.0	**6.7**	10.0										9.8	12.0	23.5
23–25 May	FOM	Government	1,500	**46**	**8**	**10**	3	3	1	–	1	1	1	0	0	0	0	–	14	12	36
19–25 May	WCIOM	Government	11,200	**34.3**	**10.0**	**11.5**	4.2	**6.5**	9.9										10.2	11.9	22.8
16–18 May	FOM	Government	1,500	**48**	**7**	**10**	3	2	1	–	0	0	1	0	0	0	0	–	17	8	38
12–18 May	WCIOM	Government	11,200	**35.0**	**10.5**	**10.8**	4.1	**6.7**	9.9										9.5	12.2	24.2
9 May	During 9th of May celebrations mobile internet outages happen, later becoming a sustained trend of internet connection quality degradation in Russia																				
5–11 May	WCIOM	Government	11,200	**36.8**	**9.9**	**11.2**	4.0	**6.4**	9.1										9.9	11.2	25.6
2–4 May	FOM	Government	1,500	**44**	**8**	**11**	2	3	1	–	1	1	0	0	0	0	0	–	15	14	33
28 Apr – 4 May	WCIOM	Government	11,200	**36.4**	**10.1**	**11.5**	3.9	**6.7**	9.6										9.5	11.2	24.9
25–27 Apr	FOM	Government	1,500	**46**	**8**	**9**	3	3	1	–	1	0	1	1	0	0	0	–	15	12	37
21–27 Apr	WCIOM	Government	11,200	**35.2**	**10.0**	**11.2**	4.1	**7.1**	9.6										9.3	12.1	24.0
17–23 Apr	Levada Center	Independent, recognized foreign agent	1,617	**42**	**8**	**10**	4	4	32												32
18–20 Apr	FOM	Government	1,500	**46**	**9**	**9**	4	3	1	–	1	1	1	0	1	0	0	–	15	9	37
14–20 Apr	WCIOM	Government	11,200	**35.8**	**9.9**	**11.5**	3.8	**6.6**	9.4										9.8	11.6	24.3
11–13 Apr	FOM	Government	1,500	**44**	**8**	**9**	3	3	1	–	1	0	1	0	0	0	0	–	14	14	35
7–13 Apr	WCIOM	Government	11,200	**36.0**	**9.4**	**10.9**	4.0	**6.6**	10.1										9.3	12.0	25.1
4–6 Apr	FOM	Government	1,500	**46**	**8**	**9**	4	2	1	–	1	0	1	0	0	0	0	–	16	12	37
31 Mar – 6 Apr	WCIOM	Government	11,200	**35.7**	**10.0**	**11.0**	3.9	**6.4**	10.5										9.0	11.9	24.7
28–30 Mar	FOM	Government	1,500	**47**	**7**	**10**	3	2	1	–	1	1	1	0	0	0	0	–	17	11	37
24–30 Mar	WCIOM	Government	11,200	**35.5**	**10.1**	**11.0**	4.0	**6.6**	10.2										9.2	12.0	24.5
21–23 Mar	FOM	Government	1,500	**48**	**8**	**10**	2	3	1	–	1	1	1	0	0	0	0	–	18	7	38
17–23 Mar	WCIOM	Government	11,200	**35.7**	**10.0**	**10.6**	3.8	**6.6**	10.1										9.8	11.9	25.1
14–16 Mar	FOM	Government	1,500	**46**	**8**	**10**	3	3	1	–	0	0	1	0	0	0	0	–	14	12	36
13 Mar	Russia Recaptures Sudzha, marking end to Ukrainian Kursk campaign and transition of military activity onto territory of Ukrainian Sumy oblast																				
10-16 Mar	WCIOM	Government	11,200	**35.9**	**9.9**	**10.7**	3.9	**6.0**	3.0	–	2.9	4.2							10.0	12.0	25.2
7–9 Mar	FOM	Government	1,500	**46**	**7**	**8**	3	3	1	–	0	1	1	1	0	0	0	–	17	11	38
3–9 Mar	WCIOM	Government	11,200	**34.9**	**10.4**	**10.5**	4.4	**6.6**	9.9										9.8	12.0	24.4
28 Feb – 2 Mar	FOM	Government	1,500	**44**	**9**	**9**	3	2	1	–	1	0	0	1	0	0	0	–	16	13	35
24 Feb – 2 Mar	WCIOM	Government	11,200	**35.3**	**10.0**	**11.2**	4.0	**6.6**	10.4										9.2	11.7	24.1
20–26 Feb	Levada Center	Independent, recognized foreign agent	1,615	**42**	**8**	**9**	3	4	34												33
21–23 Feb	FOM	Government	1,500	**47**	**8**	**9**	3	3	1	–	0	1	1	0	1	0	0	–	18	6	38
17–23 Feb	WCIOM	Government	11,200	**35.5**	**10.5**	**10.2**	4.1	**6.1**	10.3										10.0	11.8	25.0
14–16 Feb	FOM	Government	1,500	**44**	**8**	**9**	3	2	1	–	1	0	1	0	0	0	0	–	16	12	35
10–16 Feb	WCIOM	Government	11,200	**35.1**	**10.2**	**9.8**	4.3	**6.4**	10.3										9.8	12.7	24.9
7–9 Feb	FOM	Government	1,500	**44**	**8**	**8**	3	3	1	–	1	0	1	0	0	0	0	–	17	12	36
3–9 Feb	WCIOM	Government	11,200	**35.3**	**10.2**	**10.6**	3.8	**6.2**	10.2										9.7	12.5	24.7
31 Jan – 2 Feb	FOM	Government	1,500	**44**	**8**	**9**	3	3	1	–	1	1	0	1	0	0	0	–	16	12	35
27 Jan – 2 Feb	WCIOM	Government	11,200	**36.0**	**9.7**	**9.7**	4.0	**6.3**	10.8										9.5	12.5	26.3
24–31 Jan	Russian Field	Independent	–	–	–	–	–	–	–	3.7	–	–	–	–	–	–	–	–	–	–	–
24–26 Jan	FOM	Government	1,500	**47**	**8**	**9**	3	3	2	–	1	0	1	0	0	0	0	–	16	7	38
20–26 Jan	WCIOM	Government	11,200	**34.6**	**10.1**	**10.3**	4.2	**6.2**	11.1										9.2	12.9	24.3
17–19 Jan	FOM	Government	1,500	**45**	**7**	**11**	4	2	1	–	1	0	1	1	0	0	0	–	15	11	34
13–19 Jan	WCIOM	Government	11,200	**35.3**	**10.4**	**10.1**	4.1	**6.2**	10.5										9.4	12.4	24.9
10–12 Jan	FOM	Government	1,500	**44**	**7**	**9**	4	3	1	–	1	0	1	0	0	0	0	–	17	12	35
9–12 Jan	WCIOM	Government	6,400	**34.7**	**9.4**	**11.4**	3.9	**6.5**	11.3										9.3	12.1	23.3
17–19 Sep 2021	Election result			**49.82**	**18.93**	**7.55**	**7.46**	**5.84**	2.45	–	1.34	1.27	0.91	0.80	0.77	0.64	0.15	–		(48.28)	30.89

=== 2024 ===
Fieldwork date	Polling firm	Affiliation	Sample size	UR	CPRF	LDPR	SRZP	NP	RPPSJ	BLP	Yabloko	CR	Greens	Rodina	RPFJ	GA	CP	Others	Undecided	Abstention	Lead
23–27 Dec	WCIOM	Government	8,000	**35.2**	**9.7**	**10.7**	4.2	**6.5**	11.1										8.6	12.5	24.5
20–22 Dec	FOM	Government	1,500	**43**	**8**	**9**	2	2	1	–	1	1	1	0	0	0	0	–	16	14	34
16–22 Dec	WCIOM	Government	11,200	**37.0**	**9.6**	**11.0**	3.8	**6.0**	10.0										9.2	12.1	26.0
13–15 Dec	FOM	Government	1,500	**46**	**7**	**9**	2	2	1	–	1	0	0	0	0	0	0	–	16	14	37
9–15 Dec	WCIOM	Government	11,200	**36.7**	**9.7**	**10.7**	4.2	**5.7**	10.4										9.6	11.7	26.0
6–8 Dec	FOM	Government	1,500	**46**	**8**	**7**	3	4	1	–	1	0	1	1	0	0	0	–	16	11	38
2–8 Dec	WCIOM	Government	11,200	**35.5**	**9.3**	**10.8**	4.2	**7.3**	10.9										8.9	11.6	24.7
29 Nov–1 Dec	FOM	Government	1,500	**45**	**9**	**10**	3	3	1	–	0	0	1	0	0	0	0	–	18	8	35
25 Nov–1 Dec	WCIOM	Government	11,200	**35.2**	**9.8**	**10.0**	3.6	**6.6**	11.5										9.5	12.5	25.2
21–27 Nov	Levada Center	Independent, recognized foreign agent	1,600	**42**	**10**	**8**	4	4	32												32
22–24 Nov	FOM	Government	1,500	**45**	**8**	**8**	2	4	1	–	1	0	0	1	0	0	0	–	16	12	37
18–24 Nov	WCIOM	Government	11,200	**36.0**	**9.7**	**10.0**	4.1	**6.8**	11.2										8.6	12.1	26.0
15–17 Nov	FOM	Government	1,500	**44**	**9**	**10**	3	3	1	–	1	0	1	0	0	0	0	–	13	13	34
11–17 Nov	WCIOM	Government	11,200	**36.2**	**9.7**	**10.4**	3.9	**6.3**	11.1										9.2	11.9	25.8
7–12 Nov	Russian Field	Independent	––	**34.6**	**10.0**	**8.0**	**5.6**	**8.7**	3.4	4.4	4.5	–	–	–	–	–	–	1	5	15	24.6
8–10 Nov	FOM	Government	1,500	**43**	**9**	**8**	3	4	1	–	0	0	1	0	0	0	0	–	18	12	34
5–10 Nov	WCIOM	Government	9,600	**36.5**	**9.9**	**10.1**	3.6	**6.0**	10.3										10.1	12.2	26.4
1–3 Nov	FOM	Government	1,500	**48**	**7**	**11**	3	3	1	–	1	0	1	0	1	0	0	–	16	7	37
28 Oct–3 Nov	WCIOM	Government	11,200	**38.2**	**9.7**	**9.4**	4.2	**6.1**	10.7										8.5	11.8	28.5
24–30 Oct	Levada Center	Independent, recognized foreign agent	1,617	**42**	**9**	**9**	3	3	34												33
25–27 Oct	FOM	Government	1,500	**43**	**8**	**10**	3	3	2	–	1	0	1	0	0	0	0	–	16	12	33
21–27 Oct	WCIOM	Government	11,200	**36.0**	**9.8**	**10.3**	3.7	**7.0**	11.1										9.2	11.5	25.7
18–20 Oct	FOM	Government	1,500	**44**	**7**	**10**	3	3	1	–	1	1	1	1	0	0	0	–	15	12	34
14–20 Oct	WCIOM	Government	11,200	**35.6**	**10.0**	**10.6**	4.3	**7.1**	10.3										9.0	11.8	25.0
11–13 Oct	FOM	Government	1,500	**44**	**7**	**10**	3	3	1	–	1	1	1	0	0	0	0	–	16	12	34
7–13 Oct	WCIOM	Government	11,200	**36.2**	**9.5**	**9.8**	3.6	**7.0**	10.7										9.4	12.5	26.4
4–6 Oct	FOM	Government	1,500	**46**	**8**	**10**	4	3	1	–	1	0	1	0	1	0	0	–	16	9	36
30 Sep–6 Oct	WCIOM	Government	11,200	**35.8**	**10.0**	**10.0**	3.8	**6.5**	11.0										8.7	12.7	25.8
27–29 Sep	FOM	Government	1,500	**43**	**7**	**10**	3	3	1	–	1	0	1	1	1	0	0	–	15	14	33
23–29 Sep	WCIOM	Government	11,200	**36.5**	**10.0**	**10.1**	4.0	**6.2**	10.3										9.1	12.6	26.4
20–22 Sep	FOM	Government	1,500	**44**	**9**	**10**	2	3	1	–	1	1	1	0	0	0	0	–	13	14	34
16–22 Sep	WCIOM	Government	11,200	**35.1**	**9.8**	**11.4**	3.6	**6.9**	10.6										8.5	12.5	23.7
13–15 Sep	FOM	Government	1,500	**44**	**8**	**9**	4	3	1	–	0	1	1	0	0	0	0	–	15	12	35
9–15 Sep	WCIOM	Government	11,200	**35.0**	**9.8**	**11.0**	3.8	**7.0**	10.8										8.3	12.5	24.0
6–8 Sep	FOM	Government	1,500	**47**	**9**	**9**	3	4	1	–	1	0	1	0	0	0	0	–	16	8	38
2–8 Sep	WCIOM	Government	11,200	**35.9**	**8.9**	**10.1**	3.8	**6.9**	10.8										9.4	12.8	25.8
30 Aug–1 Sep	FOM	Government	1,500	**43**	**7**	**8**	2	4	1	–	1	1	0	0	1	0	0	–	17	16	35
26 Aug–1 Sep	WCIOM	Government	11,200	**34.9**	**9.2**	**10.0**	3.9	**7.0**	10.5										9.9	13.0	24.9
22–28 Aug	Levada Center	Independent, recognized foreign agent	1,619	**40**	**9**	**9**	2	4	36												31
23–25 Aug	FOM	Government	1,500	**44**	**8**	**10**	2	3	1	–	1	1	1	0	0	0	0	–	16	12	34
19–25 Aug	WCIOM	Government	11,200	**34.5**	**10.4**	**9.8**	3.5	**7.0**	10.8										10.1	12.4	24.1
13–23 Aug	Russian Field	Independent	––	–	–	–	–	–	–	4.7	–	–	–	–	–	–	–	–	–	–	–
16–18 Aug	FOM	Government	1,500	**45**	**7**	**10**	3	3	1	–	1	0	0	0	0	0	0	–	17	10	35
12–18 Aug	WCIOM	Government	11,200	**36.8**	**9.2**	**9.2**	3.6	**6.1**	10.1										10.7	12.6	27.6
9–11 Aug	FOM	Government	1,500	**44**	**9**	**9**	3	3	1	–	1	1	1	0	0	0	0	–	18	8	35
5–11 Aug	WCIOM	Government	11,200	**37.4**	**9.1**	**9.3**	3.5	**5.8**	10.5										10.4	12.5	28.1
2–4 Aug	FOM	Government	1,500	**47**	**8**	**8**	2	2	1	–	1	1	1	0	0	0	0	–	18	11	39
6 Aug	Ukrainian Kursk Oblast offensive begins, Ukraine occupies pre-2022 invasion territories of Russia.																				
29 Jul–4 Aug	WCIOM	Government	11,200	**37.5**	**9.7**	**9.1**	3.6	**6.4**	9.8										10.1	12.4	27.8
26–28 Jul	FOM	Government	1,500	**49**	**8**	**8**	3	3	1	–	0	0	1	0	0	0	0	–	15	11	41
22–28 Jul	WCIOM	Government	11,200	**36.5**	**10.0**	**9.3**	4.2	**5.9**	10.7										9.8	12.4	26.5
19–21 Jul	FOM	Government	1,500	**45**	**9**	**9**	4	4	1	–	1	0	1	0	0	0	0	–	16	9	36
15–21 Jul	WCIOM	Government	11,200	**37.5**	**10.1**	**9.5**	3.5	**5.7**	9.4										10.8	11.9	27.4
12–14 Jul	FOM	Government	1,500	**47**	**8**	**9**	3	3	1	–	1	0	1	0	0	0	0	–	17	8	38
8–14 Jul	WCIOM	Government	11,200	**38.6**	**9.7**	**8.6**	3.7	**5.9**	10.0										10.4	11.8	28.9
6 Jul	Theatre case defendants receive harsh sentences for hosting a theatrical play																				
5–7 Jul	FOM	Government	1,500	**46**	**8**	**8**	3	3	1	–	1	0	1	0	0	0	0	–	16	12	38
1–7 Jul	WCIOM	Government	11,200	**39.2**	**9.3**	**9.1**	3.5	**6.0**	9.6										10.0	12.1	29.9
28–30 Jun	FOM	Government	1,500	**47**	**8**	**8**	3	3	2	–	1	0	1	0	0	0	0	–	13	12	39
24–30 Jun	WCIOM	Government	11,200	**37.9**	**9.6**	**9.0**	3.6	**6.3**	9.6										10.3	12.1	28.3
21–23 Jun	FOM	Government	1,500	**49**	**8**	**9**	3	4	1	–	1	0	1	0	0	0	0	–	15	9	40
17–23 Jun	WCIOM	Government	11,200	**40.5**	**8.9**	**8.8**	3.7	**6.4**	9.5										9.4	11.5	31.6
14–16 Jun	FOM	Government	1,500	**48**	**8**	**8**	3	3	1	–	1	1	1	1	0	0	0	–	15	9	40
10–16 Jun	WCIOM	Government	11,200	**40.6**	**9.7**	**9.0**	3.4	**6.1**	9.4										9.3	11.1	30.9
7–9 Jun	FOM	Government	1,500	**51**	**7**	**8**	2	2	1	–	1	1	1	0	0	0	0	–	15	10	43
3–9 Jun	WCIOM	Government	11,200	**41.4**	**8.7**	**9.4**	3.6	**6.5**	9.2										8.7	11.0	32.0
23 May–4 Jun	Russian Field	Independent	––	**43.5**	**8.3**	**9.0**	4.8	**6.4**	–	4.3	2.6	–	–	–	–	–	–	1.2	19.8		34.5
31 May–2 Jun	FOM	Government	1,500	**47**	**8**	**10**	2	3	1	–	1	0	1	0	0	0	0	–	15	10	37
27 May–2 Jun	WCIOM	Government	11,200	**40.6**	**9.2**	**8.8**	3.9	**6.8**	9.1										9.3	10.8	31.4
23–29 May	Levada Center	Independent, recognized foreign agent	1,601	**46**	**9**	**8**	2	3	32												37
24–26 May	FOM	Government	1,500	**48**	**9**	**8**	3	4	1	–	1	0	1	0	0	0	0	–	15	9	39
20–26 May	WCIOM	Government	11,200	**40.3**	**9.0**	**9.4**	3.7	**6.6**	10.0										9.1	10.5	30.9
17–19 May	FOM	Government	1,500	**50**	**7**	**9**	3	2	1	–	0	0	1	0	0	0	0	–	16	9	41
13–19 May	WCIOM	Government	11,200	**40.2**	**8.7**	**9.5**	3.6	**6.5**	9.9										9.2	11.0	30.7
6–12 May	WCIOM	Government	11,200	**41.4**	**9.3**	**9.1**	3.4	**6.8**	9.7										8.7	10.0	32.1
5 May	Ocheretyno Breakthrough takes place, in the following weeks Russian Armed Forces achieve noticiable gains in occupied Donetsk Oblast																				
3–5 May	FOM	Government	1,500	**49**	**7**	**8**	2	4	1	–	1	1	0	0	0	0	0	–	15	11	41
29 Apr–5 May	WCIOM	Government	11,200	**40.3**	**9.1**	**8.8**	3.2	**7.1**	9.6										9.2	11.1	31.2
26–28 Apr	FOM	Government	1,500	**50**	**7**	**8**	3	4	1	–	1	1	0	0	0	0	0	–	15	8	42
24 Apr	Beginning of Purges in the Russian Ministry of Defense in 2024																				
22–28 Apr	WCIOM	Government	11,200	**40.9**	**8.8**	**8.6**	3.4	**7.4**	8.8										10.1	10.6	32.1
19–21 Apr	FOM	Government	1,500	**46**	**8**	**8**	3	4	1	–	1	1	1	0	0	0	0	–	16	9	38
15–21 Apr	WCIOM	Government	11,200	**41.9**	**8.7**	**7.6**	3.6	**7.3**	9.1										9.3	11.1	33.2
12–14 Apr	FOM	Government	1,500	**54**	**6**	**8**	2	3	1	–	1	0	1	0	0	0	0	–	15	9	46
8–14 Apr	WCIOM	Government	11,200	**40.4**	**9.0**	**8.5**	3.9	**8.3**	9.3										8.8	10.2	31.4
5–7 Apr	FOM	Government	1,500	**50**	**7**	**8**	3	4	1	–	1	0	1	0	0	0	0	–	16	8	42
1–7 Apr	WCIOM	Government	11,200	**41.6**	**8.7**	**8.2**	3.4	**7.8**	8.5										10.0	10.4	32.9
29–31 Mar	FOM	Government	1,500	**54**	**7**	**6**	2	3	1	–	1	0	0	0	0	0	0	–	16	10	47
25–31 Mar	WCIOM	Government	11,200	**42.6**	**8.9**	**7.7**	3.0	**7.6**	9.2										9.5	10.0	33.7
21–27 Mar	Levada Center	Independent, recognized foreign agent	1,628	**47**	**10**	**7**	3	4	29												37
22–25 Mar	FOM	Government	1,500	**52**	**7**	**7**	2	4	1	–	1	0	0	0	0	0	0	–	19	7	45
22 Mar	Crocus City Hall terrorist attack																				
18–24 Mar	WCIOM	Government	11,200	**41.6**	**9.4**	**7.9**	3.3	**8.3**	8.5										9.7	10.0	32.2
15–17 Mar	The 2024 Russian presidential election is held, Putin wins.																				
11–17 Mar	WCIOM	Government	11,200	**44.0**	**8.4**	**8.3**	3.4	**7.3**	7.9										10.8	8.5	35.6
8–10 Mar	FOM	Government	1,500	**51**	**6**	**9**	3	4	1	–	1	0	1	0	0	0	0	–	18	6	42
4–10 Mar	WCIOM	Government	11,200	**43.1**	**8.8**	**8.6**	2.8	**7.0**	7.8										11.1	9.1	34.3
1–3 Mar	FOM	Government	1,500	**53**	**7**	**8**	2	3	1	–	1	0	0	0	0	0	0	–	17	6	45
26 Feb–3 Mar	WCIOM	Government	11,200	**42.6**	**7.9**	**8.9**	3.4	**7.2**	8.6										10.6	9.1	33.7
21–28 Feb	Levada Center	Independent, recognized foreign agent	1,601	**48**	**9**	**7**	3	4	29												39
22–27 Feb	Russian Field	Independent	–1,625	**38**	**10**	**10**	3	**6**	–	–	4	–	–	–	–	–	–	1	13	13	28
23–25 Feb	FOM	Government	1,500	**48**	**8**	**10**	2	4	1	–	1	1	1	0	0	0	0	–	17	6	38
19–25 Feb	WCIOM	Government	11,200	**43.4**	**8.2**	**8.8**	3.2	**5.8**	9.0										10.7	9.1	34.6
16–18 Feb	FOM	Government	1,500	**52**	**7**	**7**	3	4	1	–	1	0	1	0	0	0	0	–	17	5	45
16 Feb	Alexei Navalny dies while serving a 19-year prison sentence																				
9–11 Feb	FOM	Government	1,500	**54**	**8**	**8**	3	3	1	–	1	0	1	0	0	0	0	–	15	5	46
5–11 Feb	WCIOM	Government	11,200	**42.7**	**8.8**	**8.3**	3.6	**5.0**	9.1										10.7	10.0	33.9
2–4 Feb	FOM	Government	1,500	**49**	**7**	**7**	2	2	1	–	1	1	1	1	0	0	0	–	17	9	42
29 Jan–4 Feb	WCIOM	Government	11,200	**42.7**	**8.5**	**8.2**	3.7	**5.0**	9.2										10.8	10.2	34.2
25–31 Jan	Levada Center	Independent, recognized foreign agent	1,621	**47**	**9**	**7**	4	3	30												38
26–28 Jan	FOM	Government	1,500	**48**	**9**	**8**	4	3	1	–	1	0	1	0	0	0	0	–	17	7	39
22–28 Jan	WCIOM	Government	11,200	**43.3**	**8.6**	**8.3**	4.0	4.8	9.4										10.9	9.1	34.7
19–21 Jan	FOM	Government	1,500	**49**	**8**	**7**	4	2	1	–	1	0	1	0	0	0	0	–	16	9	41
15–21 Jan	WCIOM	Government	11,200	**44.4**	**8.7**	**8.5**	4.0	4.2	8.9										10.6	9.2	35.7
15-19 Jan	2024 Bashkortostan protests																				
11–19 Jan	Russian Field	Independent	–1,600	**35.1**	**8.6**	**11.8**	4.2	**8.0**	–	–	**5.9**	–	–	–	–	–	–	3.2	10.3	11.8	23.3
12–14 Jan	FOM	Government	1,500	**50**	**7**	**7**	3	3	1	–	1	0	1	0	0	0	0	–	15	10	43
9–14 Jan	WCIOM	Government	9,600	**43.7**	**7.7**	**8.7**	3.7	4.6	9.7										10.3	10.0	35.0
17–19 Sep 2021	Election result			**49.82**	**18.93**	**7.55**	**7.46**	**5.32**	2.45	–	1.34	1.27	0.91	0.80	0.77	0.64	0.15	–		(48.28)	30.89

=== 2023 ===
Fieldwork date	Polling firm	Affiliation	Sample size	UR	CPRF	LDPR	SRZP	NP	RPPSJ	Yabloko	CR	Greens	Rodina	RPFJ	GA	PG	CP	Others	Undecided	Abstention	Lead
25–30 Dec	WCIOM	Government	9,600	42.9	8.3	8.0	4.8	4.3	10.0										10.4	9.6	34.6
22–24 Dec	FOM	Government	1,500	49	7	7	2	2	1	1	1	1	1	0	0	0	0	–	15	12	42
18–24 Dec	WCIOM	Government	11,200	42.2	8.8	8.6	4.4	4.5	9.3										10.7	9.9	33.4
15–17 Dec	FOM	Government	1,500	48	7	8	3	2	1	1	1	1	1	0	0	0	0	–	15	11	40
11–17 Dec	WCIOM	Government	11,200	42.0	9.8	8.3	4.4	4.7	10.0										9.7	9.3	32.2
Dec	CIPKR	CPRF-Supported	–	40	8	7	3	2	–	1	1	–	–	–	–	–	–	3	19	11	32
8–10 Dec	FOM	Government	1,500	47	9	7	3	2	1	1	0	0	0	0	0	0	0	–	14	13	38
4–10 Dec	WCIOM	Government	11,200	40.9	9.4	9.3	4.6	4.7	9.7										10.0	10.0	31.5
1–3 Dec	FOM	Government	1,500	47	8	11	4	3	1	1	0	1	0	0	0	0	0	–	15	7	36
Jun-Dec 2023	Failure of 2023 Ukrainian counteroffensive																				
27 Nov–3 Dec	WCIOM	Government	11,200	39.8	10.4	9.2	4.3	**5.0**	10.1										10.0	9.6	29.4
23–29 Nov	Levada Center	Independent, recognized foreign agent	1,625	42	9	8	4	3	34												33
24–26 Nov	FOM	Government	1,500	42	9	9	3	2	1	1	0	1	0	0	0	0	0	–	14	15	33
20–26 Nov	WCIOM	Government	11,200	40.9	9.2	9.2	4.4	4.4	10.6										9.7	9.9	31.7
17–19 Nov	FOM	Government	1,500	43	9	10	3	3	2	1	0	1	0	0	0	0	0	–	15	12	33
13–19 Nov	WCIOM	Government	11,200	39.8	9.9	8.8	4.9	4.8	10.0										9.9	10.1	29.9
10–12 Nov	FOM	Government	1,500	45	8	10	2	2	1	1	0	1	1	0	0	0	0	–	13	14	35
6–12 Nov	WCIOM	Government	11,200	40.1	10.1	9.5	4.6	4.5	9.7										9.8	10.3	30.0
3–5 Nov	FOM	Government	1,500	46	10	10	4	2	1	1	1	1	0	1	0	0	0	–	15	8	36
30 Oct–5 Nov	WCIOM	Government	11,200	39.4	9.6	9.5	4.5	4.8	9.8										9.7	11.1	29.8
27–29 Oct	FOM	Government	1,500	42	10	9	3	3	1	1	1	1	0	0	0	0	0	–	14	12	32
23–29 Oct	WCIOM	Government	11,200	39.1	10.2	9.2	4.4	**5.1**	10.4										9.2	10.6	28.9
20–22 Oct	FOM	Government	1,500	44	9	9	4	2	1	1	0	1	0	0	0	0	0	–	13	13	35
16–22 Oct	WCIOM	Government	11,200	39.6	9.9	9.5	**5.0**	4.5	9.8										9.0	11.2	29.7
13–15 Oct	FOM	Government	1,500	43	7	11	2	2	1	1	1	1	0	0	0	0	0	–	13	14	32
9–15 Oct	WCIOM	Government	11,200	40.8	9.9	9.2	4.9	4.4	9.3										8.8	11.0	30.9
6–8 Oct	FOM	Government	1,500	42	8	10	4	3	2	1	0	1	0	0	0	0	0	–	14	13	32
2–8 Oct	WCIOM	Government	11,200	39.2	10.6	9.8	4.8	4.2	10.1										8.3	11.6	28.6
29 Sep–1 Oct	FOM	Government	1,500	42	9	10	3	2	1	1	1	1	1	0	0	0	0	–	13	14	32
25 Sep–1 Oct	WCIOM	Government	11,200	38.5	10.5	9.5	**5.1**	4.7	9.7										8.5	11.9	28.0
21–27 Sep	Levada Center	Independent, recognized foreign agent	1,600	37	11	10	4	3	35												26
15–17 Sep	FOM	Government	1,500	41	8	12	4	3	1	1	0	1	0	0	0	0	0	–	13	13	29
13-17 Sep	2023 visit by Kim Jong Un to Russia																				
11–17 Sep	WCIOM	Government	11,200	39.2	10.6	9.0	4.9	**5.1**	9.9										8.4	11.2	28.6
15–17 Sep	FOM	Government	1,500	41	8	9	3	3	2	1	0	1	0	0	0	0	0	–	14	16	32
11–17 Sep	WCIOM	Government	11,200	38.4	10.3	10.0	**5.2**	4.6	9.9										8.9	11.2	28.1
7–10 Sep	FOM	Government	1,500	43	9	10	4	3	1	1	0	1	0	0	0	0	0	–	13	10	33
4–10 Sep	WCIOM	Government	11,200	38.0	10.5	9.1	**5.0**	**5.0**	10.1										10.1	10.5	27.5
2–10 Sep	Russian Field	Independent	–1,596	32.3	11.0	13.4	**7.3**	**8.3**	–	4.7	–	–	–	–	–	–	–	1.8	9.1	11.7	18.9
1–3 Sep	FOM	Government	1,500	41	8	8	3	3	1	1	0	0	0	0	0	0	0	–	17	14	33
28 Aug–3 Sep	WCIOM	Government	11,200	37.6	11.1	9.6	**5.1**	4.4	10.0										9.5	10.7	26.5
24–30 Aug	Levada Center	Independent, recognized foreign agent	1,600	33	9	10	4	3	41												23
25–27 Aug	FOM	Government	1,500	43	8	9	3	3	1	1	1	1	0	0	0	0	0	–	15	13	34
23 Aug 2023	Wagner Group plane crash including leader Yevgeny Prigozhin died in a crash																				
21–27 Aug	WCIOM	Government	11,200	37.7	10.4	9.2	4.9	4.5	10.1										9.9	11.4	27.3
18–20 Aug	FOM	Government	1,500	39	8	10	3	2	1	1	0	1	0	1	0	0	0	–	17	15	29
14–20 Aug	WCIOM	Government	11,200	37.1	10.2	9.7	4.9	4.7	9.5										10.7	11.3	26.9
11–13 Aug	FOM	Government	1,500	44	9	10	4	2	1	1	1	1	0	0	0	0	0	–	17	8	34
7–13 Aug	WCIOM	Government	11,200	37.7	10.2	9.0	**5.0**	4.5	9.8										10.4	11.5	27.5
1–9 Aug	CIPKR	CPRF-Supported	1,000	40	11	10	**5**	3	–	4	2	–	–	–	–	–	–	9	10	4	29
4–6 Aug	FOM	Government	1,500	39	10	9	3	3	1	1	0	1	0	0	0	0	0	–	16	14	29
31 Jul–6 Aug	WCIOM	Government	11,200	37.6	9.9	9.3	4.9	4.6	9.7										10.7	11.1	27.7
28–30 Jul	FOM	Government	1,500	41	8	9	4	3	1	1	1	1	0	0	0	0	0	–	15	13	32
24–30 Jul	WCIOM	Government	11,200	37.6	10.4	9.4	4.6	4.6	9.7										10.3	11.1	27.2
21–23 Jul	FOM	Government	1,500	41	9	8	3	3	1	1	0	1	0	0	0	0	0	–	18	14	32
17–23 Jul	WCIOM	Government	11,200	38.5	10.0	9.8	**5.3**	4.2	9.5										9.9	11.1	28.5
14–16 Jul	FOM	Government	1,500	43	10	10	4	3	1	1	0	1	0	0	0	0	0	–	15	9	33
10–16 Jul	WCIOM	Government	11,200	38.9	9.9	9.2	4.8	4.3	9.5										10.3	11.5	29.0
7–9 Jul	FOM	Government	1,500	42	9	9	3	2	1	1	0	1	0	0	0	0	0	–	15	14	33
3–9 Jul	WCIOM	Government	11,200	37.9	9.3	9.8	4.6	4.5	10.0										11.1	11.2	28.1
30 Jun–2 Jul	FOM	Government	1,500	41	8	11	3	2	1	1	0	1	1	0	0	0	0	–	15	13	30
26 Jun–2 Jul	WCIOM	Government	11,200	39.0	9.4	9.0	**5.0**	4.1	9.2										10.8	11.6	29.6
22–28 Jun	Levada Center	Independent, recognized foreign agent	1,634	39	8	9	4	3	37												30
23–25 Jun	FOM	Government	1,500	42	7	10	4	2	1	1	0	1	0	0	0	0	0	–	16	14	32
19–25 Jun	WCIOM	Government	11,200	37.9	10.4	9.2	**5.6**	4.3	9.1										11.2	10.7	27.5
23–24 Jun	Wagner Group rebellion.																				
16–18 Jun	FOM	Government	1,500	46	8	10	4	3	1	1	1	1	0	0	0	0	0	–	15	9	36
12–18 Jun	WCIOM	Government	11,200	39.3	10.0	8.6	**5.8**	4.4	9.9										9.7	10.8	29.3
9–11 Jun	FOM	Government	1,500	41	8	9	3	2	1	1	1	1	0	0	0	0	0	–	16	15	32
5–11 Jun	WCIOM	Government	11,200	38.6	10.2	9.5	**5.3**	4.3	9.5										10.6	10.5	28.4
2–4 Jun	FOM	Government	1,500	44	9	9	3	3	2	1	1	1	0	0	0	0	0	–	15	11	35
29 May–4 Jun	WCIOM	Government	11,200	37.7	10.1	9.5	**5.7**	4.3	9.4										10.6	11.0	27.6
26–28 May	FOM	Government	1,500	41	8	10	4	3	1	1	1	1	0	1	0	0	0	–	18	11	31
22–28 May	WCIOM	Government	11,200	37.9	10.5	9.3	**5.8**	4.4	9.8										10.9	10.1	27.4
19–21 May	FOM	Government	1,500	43	10	9	**5**	3	1	1	1	1	0	1	0	0	0	–	15	8	33
20 May	Yevgeniy Prigozhin's PMC Wagner achieves victory in the Battle of Bakhmut																				
15–21 May	WCIOM	Government	11,200	37.9	10.4	9.4	**5.7**	4.7	9.8										10.3	10.1	27.5
13–16 May	Russian Field	Independent	–1,600	30.2	12.4	10.9	**6.8**	**5.4**	–	4.9	–	–	–	–	–	–	–	3.7	10.0	14.7	17.8
12–14 May	FOM	Government	1,500	44	9	9	3	2	2	1	0	1	0	0	0	0	0	–	16	10	35
8–14 May	WCIOM	Government	11,200	39.3	10.4	9.3	**5.9**	4.1	8.5										10.3	10.5	28.9
3 May	Kremlin drone attack																				
2–7 May	WCIOM	Government	9,600	39.4	10.8	9.6	**5.4**	4.1	9.2										9.7	10.7	28.6
28–30 Apr	FOM	Government	1,500	44	8	9	4	3	1	1	0	1	1	0	0	0	0	–	15	13	35
24–30 Apr	WCIOM	Government	11,200	39.0	10.2	9.3	**5.6**	4.3	9.2										9.8	11.0	28.8
20–26 Apr	Levada Center	Independent, recognized foreign agent	1,633	39	10	9	**5**	3	34												29
21–23 Apr	FOM	Government	1,500	46	9	10	4	2	1	1	1	1	1	0	0	0	0	–	14	9	36
17–23 Apr	WCIOM	Government	11,200	37.6	10.7	9.5	**5.7**	4.6	9.8										10.0	10.5	26.9
14–16 Apr	FOM	Government	1,500	42	8	9	3	2	2	1	0	1	0	0	0	0	0	–	16	13	33
10–16 Apr	WCIOM	Government	11,200	39.0	10.2	9.3	**5.2**	4.3	10.2										9.8	10.4	28.8
7–9 Apr	FOM	Government	1,500	42	8	10	3	2	1	1	1	1	0	0	0	0	0	–	17	12	32
3–9 Apr	WCIOM	Government	11,200	39.8	10.3	8.9	**5.5**	4.7	9.9										9.2	10.2	29.5
31 Mar–2 Apr	FOM	Government	1,500	45	10	8	3	3	1	1	0	1	1	0	0	0	0	–	15	10	35
27 Mar–2 Apr	WCIOM	Government	11,200	40.3	9.9	8.3	**5.7**	4.7	9.3										10.2	10.1	30.4
23–29 Mar	Levada Center	Independent, recognized foreign agent	1,633	39	10	7	4	3	37												29
24–26 Mar	FOM	Government	1,500	47	9	9	4	3	1	1	1	1	0	0	0	0	0	–	14	7	38
20–26 Mar	WCIOM	Government	11,200	38.8	10.5	8.8	**5.6**	4.4	9.5										10.3	10.6	28.3
17–19 Mar	FOM	Government	1,500	45	9	9	4	2	1	1	0	1	0	0	0	0	0	–	16	10	36
13–19 Mar	WCIOM	Government	11,200	39.3	10.7	9.0	**5.5**	4.4	9.2										10.1	10.3	28.6
10–12 Mar	FOM	Government	1,500	44	10	8	3	3	1	1	1	1	0	0	1	0	0	–	14	11	34
6–12 Mar	WCIOM	Government	11,200	39.5	10.6	8.4	**5.6**	4.8	9.2										10.0	10.0	28.9
3–5 Mar	FOM	Government	1,500	45	9	7	3	3	1	1	0	1	0	1	0	0	0	–	14	13	36
27 Feb–5 Mar	WCIOM	Government	11,200	38.8	10.3	8.7	**5.3**	4.4	9.7										10.0	11.1	28.5
24–26 Feb	FOM	Government	1,500	47	9	9	**5**	2	1	1	0	1	0	0	0	0	0	–	14	9	38
20–26 Feb	WCIOM	Government	11,200	39.2	10.5	8.2	**5.6**	4.9	9.1										10.6	10.3	28.7
17–19 Feb	FOM	Government	1,500	43	10	8	3	3	1	1	0	1	1	0	0	0	0	–	13	14	33
13–19 Feb	WCIOM	Government	11,200	39.1	10.8	8.8	**5.7**	4.7	9.6										9.3	10.4	28.3
10–12 Feb	FOM	Government	1,500	40	10	7	3	3	2	1	1	1	0	0	0	0	0	–	15	15	30
6–12 Feb	WCIOM	Government	11,200	38.6	10.5	8.5	**5.3**	4.6	9.7										10.5	10.8	28.1
3–5 Feb	FOM	Government	1,500	41	9	8	4	3	1	1	1	1	0	0	0	0	0	–	13	16	32
30 Jan–5 Feb	WCIOM	Government	11,200	37.7	10.9	8.9	**5.2**	4.5	10.4										9.9	10.9	26.8
26–31 Jan	Levada Center	Independent, recognized foreign agent	1,616	37	9	8	**5**	4	37												28
27–29 Jan	FOM	Government	1,500	44	8	10	**5**	3	1	1	0	1	0	1	0	0	0	–	16	9	34
23–29 Jan	WCIOM	Government	11,200	38.4	10.2	8.0	**6.0**	4.4	10.6										10.1	10.6	28.2
20–22 Jan	FOM	Government	1,500	44	8	8	3	2	1	1	1	1	1	0	0	0	0	–	14	13	36
16–22 Jan	WCIOM	Government	11,200	38.7	11.0	9.1	**5.2**	4.6	9.6										9.5	10.8	27.7
13–15 Jan	FOM	Government	1,500	42	7	9	3	2	1	1	1	1	1	0	0	0	0	–	16	14	33
9–15 Jan	WCIOM	Government	11,200	38.8	10.6	9.2	**5.7**	3.9	10.2										9.4	10.6	28.2
17–19 Sep 2021	Election result			49.82	18.93	7.55	**7.46**	**5.32**	2.45	1.34	1.27	0.91	0.80	0.77	0.64	0.52	0.15	–		(48.28)	30.89

=== 2022 ===
Fieldwork date	Polling firm	Affiliation	Sample size	UR	CPRF	LDPR	SRZP	NP	RPPSJ	Yabloko	CR	Greens	Rodina	RPFJ	GA	PG	CP	Others	Undecided	Abstention	Lead
26–30 Dec	WCIOM	Government	8,000	38.4	10.4	9.3	**5.7**	4.1	10.2										9.2	10.9	28.0
23–25 Dec	FOM	Government	1,500	44	10	8	4	2	1	1	0	1	1	0	0	0	0	–	14	13	34
19–25 Dec	WCIOM	Government	11,200	37.2	10.8	9.2	**5.7**	4.6	10.3										10.0	10.5	26.4
16–18 Dec	FOM	Government	1,500	41	9	11	4	3	1	1	1	1	1	0	0	0	0	–	14	13	30
12–18 Dec	WCIOM	Government	11,200	37.3	11.0	9.6	**5.4**	4.6	9.9										9.8	10.9	26.3
9–11 Dec	FOM	Government	1,500	41	9	8	**5**	2	1	1	1	1	0	0	0	0	0	–	14	15	32
5–11 Dec	WCIOM	Government	11,200	37.9	10.3	8.3	**5.9**	4.6	10.5										9.9	11.0	27.6
2–4 Dec	FOM	Government	1,500	42	9	10	3	3	1	1	1	1	0	1	0	0	0	–	16	10	32
28 Nov–4 Dec	WCIOM	Government	11,200	37.7	10.7	8.5	**6.2**	4.9	10.2										9.6	10.8	27.0
Nov–Dec	CIPKR	CPRF-Supported	–	38	11	6	4	2	–	1	1	–	–	–	–	–	–	7	19	11	27
24–30 Nov	Levada Center	Independent, recognized foreign agent	1,601	36	11	8	4	4	37												25
25–27 Nov	FOM	Government	1,500	43	9	7	3	3	1	1	1	1	0	0	0	0	0	–	13	15	34
21–27 Nov	WCIOM	Government	11,200	38.2	10.4	8.5	**6.0**	4.9	9.5										9.6	11.2	27.8
18–20 Nov	FOM	Government	1,500	43	9	8	4	3	1	1	0	1	0	0	0	0	0	–	15	14	34
14–20 Nov	WCIOM	Government	11,200	38.8	10.7	8.9	**5.6**	4.7	10.1										9.7	10.0	28.1
11–13 Nov	FOM	Government	1,500	42	9	9	4	2	1	1	1	0	0	0	0	0	0	–	15	14	33
11 Nov	Ukraine liberates Kherson following a counteroffensive																				
7–13 Nov	WCIOM	Government	11,200	38.5	10.4	8.9	**5.6**	4.6	9.2										10.3	11.2	28.1
6–9 Nov	INSOMAR	Government	1,600	37	11	8	**5**	4	35												26
4–6 Nov	FOM	Government	1,500	44	9	8	4	2	1	1	0	1	0	0	0	0	0	–	15	12	35
31 Oct–6 Nov	WCIOM	Government	11,200	40.4	10.3	8.1	**5.4**	4.7	9.5										9.6	10.5	30.1
28–30 Oct	FOM	Government	1,500	41	9	8	4	3	1	1	0	0	1	0	0	0	0	–	14	16	32
24–30 Oct	WCIOM	Government	11,200	40.3	9.9	8.9	**6.1**	4.2	9.7										9.3	10.3	30.4
21–23 Oct	FOM	Government	1,500	43	9	8	4	2	1	1	0	1	1	0	0	0	0	–	14	14	34
17–23 Oct	WCIOM	Government	11,200	40.6	11.1	8.6	**5.9**	4.5	9.5										8.7	9.8	29.5
14–16 Oct	FOM	Government	1,500	47	8	8	3	2	1	1	1	1	0	0	0	0	0	–	13	14	39
10–16 Oct	WCIOM	Government	11,200	41.0	10.1	8.2	**5.8**	4.8	9.1										9.0	10.5	30.9
7–9 Oct	FOM	Government	1,500	43	10	8	**5**	3	1	1	0	1	1	0	0	0	0	–	15	10	33
3–9 Oct	WCIOM	Government	11,200	41.0	10.1	9.1	**5.3**	4.3	8.9										9.4	10.2	30.9
30 Sep–2 Oct	FOM	Government	1,500	46	8	8	3	3	1	1	0	1	0	0	1	0	0	–	14	12	38
26 Sep–2 Oct	WCIOM	Government	11,200	41.6	10.0	8.6	**5.6**	4.1	9.5										9.4	10.1	31.6
30 Sep	Russia annexes part of southeastern Ukraine.																				
22–28 Sep	Levada Center	Independent, recognized foreign agent	1,631	36	11	9	4	3	37												25
23–25 Sep	FOM	Government	1,500	41	9	7	4	3	1	1	0	1	0	1	0	0	0	–	14	15	32
19–25 Sep	WCIOM	Government	11,200	40.9	11.0	8.1	**5.8**	4.0	9.7										8.7	10.4	29.9
21 Sep	2022 Russian mobilization begins																				
16–18 Sep	FOM	Government	1,500	42	9	8	3	3	1	1	0	1	0	0	0	0	0	–	14	15	33
12–18 Sep	WCIOM	Government	11,200	41.0	10.9	7.8	**5.5**	4.2	9.3										9.0	10.7	30.1
6 Sept - Oct	Ukraine liberates most of the occupied Kharkiv Oblast during the Kharkiv counteroffensive																				
9–11 Sep	FOM	Government	1,500	43	10	10	4	3	1	1	1	1	0	0	0	0	0	–	15	9	33
5–11 Sep	WCIOM	Government	11,200	40.7	10.3	7.5	**5.8**	4.1	9.8										10.0	10.4	30.4
2–4 Sep	FOM	Government	1,500	40	10	9	3	3	1	1	0	1	0	0	0	0	0	–	18	12	30
29 Aug–4 Sep	WCIOM	Government	11,200	39.4	10.3	8.3	**6.2**	4.2	9.7										10.2	10.4	29.1
26–28 Aug	FOM	Government	1,500	41	10	7	4	2	1	1	1	1	0	0	0	0	0	–	16	14	31
22–28 Aug	WCIOM	Government	11,200	40.2	10.2	8.1	**5.7**	4.8	9.4										10.1	10.2	30.0
19–21 Aug	FOM	Government	1,500	40	10	8	4	2	1	1	0	1	0	0	0	0	0	–	16	13	30
15–21 Aug	WCIOM	Government	11,200	39.9	10.7	8.6	**5.4**	4.3	9.9										10.0	10.0	29.2
12–14 Aug	FOM	Government	1,500	44	10	10	4	2	1	1	0	1	0	0	0	0	0	–	13	11	34
8–14 Aug	WCIOM	Government	11,200	40.0	11.3	7.8	**5.4**	4.4	9.9										10.1	9.8	28.7
5–7 Aug	FOM	Government	1,500	42	10	8	4	3	1	1	1	1	0	0	0	0	0	–	13	13	32
1–7 Aug	WCIOM	Government	11,200	40.7	10.8	7.5	**5.7**	4.2	9.7										9.7	10.3	29.9
29–31 Jul	FOM	Government	1,500	42	8	8	4	3	1	2	1	1	0	0	0	0	0	–	14	14	34
25–31 Jul	WCIOM	Government	11,200	40.3	10.6	7.9	**5.5**	4.4	9.6										10.2	10.3	29.7
21–27 Jul	Levada Center	Independent, recognized foreign agent	1,617	40	10	8	**5**	3	34												30
22–24 Jul	FOM	Government	1,500	41	9	8	3	4	1	1	1	1	0	0	0	0	0	–	15	14	32
18–24 Jul	WCIOM	Government	11,200	41.4	10.3	7.5	**5.8**	4.3	9.7										9.9	9.6	31.1
15–17 Jul	FOM	Government	1,500	45	10	8	4	2	1	2	1	1	0	0	0	0	0	–	14	10	35
11–17 Jul	WCIOM	Government	11,200	40.0	10.8	7.6	**5.8**	4.4	9.6										10.1	10.3	29.2
8–10 Jul	FOM	Government	1,500	44	11	8	4	3	1	1	0	1	1	0	0	0	0	–	12	13	33
4–10 Jul	WCIOM	Government	11,200	40.5	11.3	8.2	**5.7**	4.5	9.8										8.8	9.8	29.2
1–3 Jul	FOM	Government	1,500	42	9	8	3	3	1	1	0	1	0	0	1	0	0	–	15	14	33
27 Jun–3 Jul	WCIOM	Government	11,200	40.6	10.8	7.8	**5.3**	4.4	9.7										9.7	10.1	29.8
23–29 Jun	Levada Center	Independent, recognized foreign agent	1,628	38	11	9	4	4	34												27
24–26 Jun	FOM	Government	1,500	42	11	8	4	2	1	1	1	1	0	0	0	0	0	–	13	14	31
20–26 Jun	WCIOM	Government	11,200	41.0	11.1	7.9	**5.6**	4.9	9.6										9.4	9.1	29.9
17–19 Jun	FOM	Government	1,500	44	9	8	4	3	1	2	0	1	1	0	0	0	0	–	17	9	35
13–19 Jun	WCIOM	Government	11,200	41.6	10.2	7.6	**5.7**	4.7	9.9										9.6	9.2	31.4
10–12 Jun	FOM	Government	1,500	44	10	9	3	2	1	1	0	1	0	0	0	0	0	–	12	14	34
6–12 Jun	WCIOM	Government	11,200	40.9	10.7	8.5	**6.5**	**5.0**	9.1										9.3	9.6	30.2
3–5 Jun	FOM	Government	1,500	44	10	8	4	3	1	1	1	0	0	0	0	0	0	–	13	13	34
30 May–5 Jun	WCIOM	Government	11,200	41.7	10.4	7.9	**5.7**	4.7	9.7										9.4	9.4	31.3
26–31 May	Levada Center	Independent, recognized foreign agent	1,634	38	11	7	4	4	36												27
27–29 May	FOM	Government	1,500	41	10	10	3	3	1	1	1	1	0	0	0	0	0	–	12	15	31
4 Dec	Leonid Slutsky is elected as the leader of the Liberal Democratic Party																				
23–29 May	WCIOM	Government	11,200	40.7	10.9	8.0	**5.9**	4.7	9.6										9.6	9.3	29.8
23–26 May	Russian Field	Independent	––	36.0	10.3	7.1	**5.4**	4.1	–	3.4	–	–	–	–	–	–	–	3.8	13.7	14.8	25.7
20–22 May	FOM	Government	1,500	46	10	10	**5**	2	1	1	0	1	0	0	0	0	0	–	14	7	36
16–22 May	WCIOM	Government	11,200	41.2	11.2	8.4	**5.7**	4.5	8.8										9.7	9.1	30.0
13–15 May	FOM	Government	1,500	41	9	9	4	3	1	1	1	1	0	0	0	0	0	–	12	14	32
10–15 May	WCIOM	Government	9,600	40.5	10.7	8.7	**5.6**	4.6	9.7										10.0	9.0	29.8
2–8 May	WCIOM	Government	11,200	39.9	11.3	8.7	**5.3**	4.9	9.5										10.1	8.7	28.6
29 Apr–1 May	FOM	Government	1,500	42	9	11	3	3	1	1	0	1	0	0	0	0	0	–	11	14	31
25 Apr–1 May	WCIOM	Government	11,200	41.2	11.2	8.5	**5.9**	4.8	9.1										10.2	7.8	30.0
21–27 Apr	Levada Center	Independent, recognized foreign agent	1,616	40	10	8	4	**5**	33												30
22–24 Apr	FOM	Government	1,500	45	10	9	4	3	1	1	0	1	0	1	0	0	0	–	15	8	35
18–24 Apr	WCIOM	Government	11,200	40.6	11.4	8.9	**5.2**	4.5	10.2										10.0	7.8	29.2
15–17 Apr	FOM	Government	1,500	45	9	9	4	2	1	1	0	1	0	0	0	0	0	–	12	13	36
11–17 Apr	WCIOM	Government	11,200	40.4	10.3	9.4	**5.8**	**5.0**	9.0										11.3	7.5	30.1
14 Apr	Sinking of the Moskva																				
8–10 Apr	FOM	Government	1,500	42	8	11	**5**	2	1	1	0	1	1	0	0	0	0	–	13	13	31
4–10 Apr	WCIOM	Government	11,200	42.5	11.1	8.8	**5.6**	4.8	8.4										10.7	6.5	31.4
6 Apr	Liberal Democratic Party of Russia leader Vladimir Zhirinovsky dies.																				
1-8 Apr	Russian withdrawal from North Ukraine																				
1–3 Apr	FOM	Government	1,500	44	9	8	4	3	1	1	0	1	0	0	0	0	0	–	14	13	35
28 Mar–3 Apr	WCIOM	Government	11,200	42.2	11.2	7.7	**5.4**	4.4	9.2										11.0	7.3	31.0
24–30 Mar	Levada Center	Independent, recognized foreign agent	1,632	54	15	13	**6**	**5**	1	0	1	1	0	1	–				–		39
25–27 Mar	FOM	Government	1,500	45	10	8	**5**	3	1	1	1	1	0	0	0	0	0	–	15	9	35
21–27 Mar	WCIOM	Government	11,200	41.0	11.2	8.5	**5.8**	4.6	9.2										11.0	7.1	29.8
18–20 Mar	FOM	Government	1,500	43	11	8	4	3	1	1	0	1	0	1	0	0	0	–	13	12	32
14–20 Mar	WCIOM	Government	11,200	41.8	11.1	7.9	**5.4**	4.9	8.8										11.4	7.4	30.7
11–13 Mar	FOM	Government	1,500	41	10	8	3	3	1	1	1	1	0	0	0	0	0	–	16	14	31
7–13 Mar	WCIOM	Government	11,200	40.0	11.8	7.2	**6.3**	**5.2**	8.6										11.3	8.0	28.2
4–6 Mar	FOM	Government	1,500	44	10	8	3	3	1	1	1	1	0	0	0	0	0	–	13	13	34
28 Feb–6 Mar	WCIOM	Government	11,200	39.4	11.7	7.4	**5.2**	**5.1**	9.4										12.1	7.9	27.7
25–27 Feb	FOM	Government	1,500	41	12	7	**5**	4	1	1	1	1	1	0	0	0	0	–	14	10	29
21–27 Feb	WCIOM	Government	11,200	36.0	13.0	7.2	**5.8**	**5.9**	9.8										11.1	9.2	23.0
24 Feb	Beginning of Russian invasion of Ukraine																				
21 Feb	Russia officially recognizes independence of Donetsk People's Republic and Luhansk People's Republic																				
17–21 Feb	Levada Center	Independent, recognized foreign agent	1,618	31	13	8	**5**	4	1	1	0	1	0	0	0				36		18
18–20 Feb	FOM	Government	3,000	32	14	8	4	**5**	2	1	1	1	1	0	0	0	0	–	14	14	18
14–20 Feb	WCIOM	Government	11,200	30.3	16.0	7.2	**6.5**	**6.9**	10.7										10.9	9.6	14.3
11–13 Feb	FOM	Government	3,000	31	14	8	4	**5**	2	1	1	1	1	0	0	0	0	–	13	17	17
7–13 Feb	WCIOM	Government	11,200	30.6	15.7	7.7	**6.6**	**7.1**	10.3										9.7	10.1	14.9
4–6 Feb	FOM	Government	3,000	33	14	8	**5**	**5**	1	1	1	1	1	0	1	0	0	–	14	13	19
31 Jan–6 Feb	WCIOM	Government	11,200	30.6	15.3	8.2	**6.2**	**7.1**	10.5										10.4	9.7	15.3
28–30 Jan	FOM	Government	3,000	34	15	8	**6**	**5**	1	1	1	1	1	0	0	0	0	–	14	11	19
24–30 Jan	WCIOM	Government	11,200	30.7	15.6	7.8	**6.5**	**6.7**	10.0										10.3	10.3	15.1
21–23 Jan	FOM	Government	3,000	32	15	9	**5**	4	2	1	1	1	0	0	0	0	0	–	14	14	17
17–23 Jan	WCIOM	Government	11,200	30.6	16.3	8.0	**6.4**	**7.2**	10.6										9.6	9.4	14.3
14–16 Jan	FOM	Government	1,500	31	13	9	4	4	2	1	1	1	0	0	1	0	0	–	15	17	18
10–16 Jan	WCIOM	Government	11,200	31.1	16.6	7.2	**6.6**	**7.3**	10.2										10.0	9.3	14.5
6 Jan	CSTO Operation in Kazakhstan																				
17–19 Sep 2021	Election result			49.82	18.93	7.55	**7.46**	**5.32**	2.45	1.34	1.27	0.91	0.80	0.77	0.64	0.52	0.15	–		(48.28)	30.89

=== 2021 ===
Fieldwork date	Polling firm	Affiliation	Sample	UR	CPRF	LDPR	SRZP	NP	RPPSJ	Yabloko	CR	Greens	Rodina	RPFJ	GA	PG	CP	Others	Undecided	Abstention	Lead
27–30 Dec	WCIOM	Government	11,200	30.5	17.4	6.9	**6.9**	7.2	10.7										9.0	9.9	13.1
24–26 Dec	FOM	Government	3,000	30	15	7	**5**	5	2	1	1	1	0	0	0	0	0	–	12	17	15
20–26 Dec	WCIOM	Government	11,200	29.8	18.1	7.5	**7.0**	7.4	10.7										8.8	9.1	11.7
16–22 Dec	Levada Center	Independent, recognized foreign agent	1,640	27	15	8	**5**	5	1	1	0	1	0	1	0				36		12
17–19 Dec	FOM	Government	3,000	31	15	7	**5**	5	1	1	1	1	0	0	1	0	0	–	12	18	16
13–19 Dec	WCIOM	Government	11,200	29.5	17.9	7.1	**6.7**	7.7	9.8										9.6	9.9	11.6
10–12 Dec	FOM	Government	3,000	32	15	8	**5**	6	1	1	1	1	1	0	0	0	0	–	13	14	17
6–12 Dec	WCIOM	Government	11,200	27.7	18.1	7.4	**6.5**	7.9	10.6										9.5	10.4	9.6
3–5 Dec	FOM	Government	3,000	32	16	9	**5**	6	1	1	1	1	0	0	0	0	0	–	14	11	16
29 Nov–5 Dec	WCIOM	Government	11,200	28.3	18.2	7.7	**6.9**	8.6	10.1										8.7	9.8	10.1
4 Dec	Dmitry Medvedev is re-elected as the leader of the United Russia party																				
25 Nov–1 Dec	Levada Center	Independent, recognized foreign agent	1,600	26	13	8	4	5	1	1	0	1	0	1	0				40		13
26–28 Nov	FOM	Government	3,000	31	15	9	**5**	6	2	1	1	1	0	0	0	0	0	–	13	14	16
22–28 Nov	WCIOM	Government	11,200	28.6	18.0	7.8	**6.9**	8.1	10.2										8.9	9.3	10.6
19–21 Nov	FOM	Government	3,000	30	15	8	**5**	6	1	1	1	1	0	0	0	0	0	–	12	16	15
15–21 Nov	WCIOM	Government	11,200	29.2	18.6	7.6	**6.9**	8.2	10.1										8.7	8.8	10.6
12–14 Nov	FOM	Government	3,000	30	15	9	**5**	6	1	2	1	1	1	0	0	0	0	–	12	14	15
8–14 Nov	WCIOM	Government	11,200	28.9	18.7	7.9	**6.5**	8.1	10.8										8.5	9.3	10.2
5–7 Nov	FOM	Government	3,000	31	15	10	**6**	7	2	2	1	1	1	1	1	0	0	–	13	11	16
1–7 Nov	WCIOM	Government	11,200	30.2	17.7	7.4	**6.6**	7.8	10.7										8.9	9.1	12.5
29–31 Oct	FOM	Government	3,000	31	16	9	**6**	6	2	1	1	1	0	0	1	0	0	–	12	13	15
25–31 Oct	WCIOM	Government	11,200	28.6	19.4	8.1	**7.1**	8.7	9.9										8.0	8.7	9.2
21–27 Oct	Levada Center	Independent, recognized foreign agent	1,636	29	14	8	**5**	5	1	1	0	1	0	2					7	23	15
22–24 Oct	FOM	Government	3,000	29	17	8	**6**	6	2	1	1	1	0	0	0	0	0	–	11	16	12
18–24 Oct	WCIOM	Government	11,200	29.8	19.4	7.3	**6.9**	8.5	11.1										7.9	7.7	10.4
15–17 Oct	FOM	Government	3,000	30	18	9	**6**	6	1	1	1	2	0	0	0	0	0	–	12	13	12
Autumn 2021	2021 Russian election protests																				
11–17 Oct	WCIOM	Government	11,200	30.1	19.8	7.7	**6.0**	8.6	10.4										7.7	8.5	10.3
4–10 Oct	WCIOM	Government	11,200	29.8	20.2	7.5	**6.3**	8.6	11.1										6.9	8.1	9.6
27 Sep–3 Oct	WCIOM	Government	11,200	29.8	20.2	7.3	**6.1**	8.4	11.0										7.7	8.1	9.6
20–26 Sep	WCIOM	Government	11,200	29.5	23.3	7.6	**6.4**	8.4	9.8										6.9	6.9	6.2
Sep	CIPKR	CPRF-Supported	–	23	20	7	**5**	5	–	4	1	–	–	–	–	–	–	6	12	17	3
17–19 Sep 2021	Election result			49.82	18.93	7.55	**7.46**	5.32	2.45	1.34	1.27	0.91	0.80	0.77	0.64	0.52	0.15	–		(48.28)	30.89

== Regional polls and elections ==
=== Altai Republic ===
Fieldwork date	Polling firm	Sample size	UR	CPRF	SRZP	LDPR	NP	Rodina	Others	Undecided	Abstention	Lead
6–8 Sep 2024	Regional election	–	53.84	13.63	5.70	18.17	3.57	1.65	3.43	–	(54.39)	35.30
17–19 Sep 2021	Election result		38.50	30.09	8.85	7.85	4.92	0.55	9.24		(53.81)	8.41

=== Amur Oblast ===
Fieldwork date	Polling firm	Sample size	UR	CPRF	LDPR	NP	SRZP	CR	Yabloko	Others	Undecided	Abstention	Lead
5–17 Aug 2023	CIPKR	499	43	12	10	6	4	3	2	4	7	9	31
17–19 Sep 2021	Election result		34.32	26.55	14.17	7.04	5.54	2.28	0.55	9.55		(58.35)	7.77

=== Arkhangelsk Oblast ===
Fieldwork date	Polling firm	Sample size	UR	CPRF	LDPR	SRZP	NP	Rodina	Greens	CR	Others	Undecided	Abstention	Lead
8–10 Sep 2023	Regional election	–	50.18	10.92	14.88	8.99	5.21	1.74	2.10	3.47	–	–	(71.98)	35.30
17–19 Sep 2021	Election result		32.21	18.70	12.92	11.17	9.86	1.18	1.02	0.91	12.03		(58.42)	13.51

=== Bashkortostan ===
Fieldwork date	Polling firm	Sample size	UR	CPRF	LDPR	NP	SRZP	Greens	Rodina	Others	Undecided	Abstention	Lead
10 Sep 2023	Regional election	–	68.92	11.71	7.73	3.41	7.39	(Note: Only constituencies)		–	–	(48.37)	57.21
17–19 Sep 2021	Election result		66.61	14.74	8.67	2.79	2.62	0.47	0.26	3.84		(27.21)	51.87

=== Bryansk Oblast ===
Fieldwork date	Polling firm	Sample size	UR	CPRF	LDPR	SRZP	NP	Rodina	CR	CP	Others	Undecided	Abstention	Lead
6–8 Sep 2024	Regional election	–	68.69	8.35	13.28	3.51	2.46	0.86	1.41		–	–	(42.78)	55.41
17–19 Sep 2021	Election result		64.32	13.70	8.60	4.97	2.33	0.88	0.70	0.19	4.31		(31.35)	50.62

=== Buryatia ===
Fieldwork date	Polling firm	Sample size	UR	CPRF	NP	LDPR	SRZP	CR	Yabloko	Others	Undecided	Abstention	Lead
10 Sep 2023	Regional election	–	60.84	17.08	8.29	6.16	4.71	–	–	–	–	(63.74)	43.76
16–20 Feb 2023	CIPKR	472	38	14	4	4	2	1	1	9	15	12	24
17–19 Sep 2021	Election result		42.63	26.74	11.22	5.74	3.56	1.26	0.41	8.44		(55.03)	15.89

=== Chelyabinsk Oblast ===
Fieldwork date	Polling firm	Sample size	UR	CPRF	SRZP	NP	LDPR	RPPSJ	Others	Undecided	Abstention	Lead
12–14 Sep 2025	Regional election	–	54.48	5.94	13.43	8.11	9.79	5.69	–	–	(60.10)	41.05
18–20 Aug 2025	Russian Field	1,500	47.8	9.2	11.2	12.6	12.7	5.4	0.6	–	0.4	35.1
17–19 Sep 2021	Election result		34.31	19.69	17.25	8.30	7.83	3.78	8.57		(53.46)	14.35

=== Irkutsk Oblast ===
Fieldwork date	Polling firm	Sample size	UR	CPRF	NP	LDPR	SRZP	CR	Yabloko	RPFJ	CP	Others	Undecided	Abstention	Lead
8–10 Sep 2023	Regional election	–	54.60	15.47	7.34	9.62	7.06	–	–	1.33	0.98	–	–	(75.79)	39.13
1–20 Aug 2023	Russian Field	8,800	38.6	9.8	8.0	9.5	3.8	1.6	–	0.6	0.9	–	23.5	–	28.8
21–27 Jun 2023	CIPKR	486	33	11	7	10	4	1	4	–	–	6	15	9	22
17–19 Sep 2021	Election result		35.53	27.81	9.81	8.58	6.67	1.40	0.86	0.76	0.26	8.32		(63.01)	7.72

=== Ivanovo Oblast ===
Fieldwork date	Polling firm	Sample size	UR	CPRF	LDPR	SRZP	NP	RPPSJ	Yabloko	CR	Others	Undecided	Abstention	Lead
8–10 Sep 2023	Ragional election	–	65.39	9.86	10.08	4.06	3.90		–		–	–	(66.13)	55.31
10–15 Feb 2023	CIPKR	502	30	14	8	4	4	–	4	1	11	14	10	16
17–19 Sep 2021	Election result		36.24	26.74	9.38	7.63	5.90	3.44	1.81	1.43	7.43		(61.74)	8.22

=== Kabardino-Balkaria ===
Fieldwork date	Polling firm	Sample size	UR	CPRF	SRZP	LDPR	Greens	NP	Others	Undecided	Abstention	Lead
8 Sep 2024	Regional election	–	65.71	12.90	10.38	5.08	5.06	0.75	–	–	(26.27)	52.81
17–19 Sep 2021	Election result		79.20	16.69	2.90	0.35	0.15	0.07	0.64		(14.22)	62.51

=== Kalmykia ===
Fieldwork date	Polling firm	Sample size	UR	CPRF	NP	SRZP	RPPSJ	LDPR	RPFJ	PG	Others	Undecided	Abstention	Lead
8–10 Sep 2023	Regional election	–	64.17	13.33	8.37	5.23		3.62	1.56	0.77	–	–	(57.99)	50.84
17–19 Sep 2021	Election result		39.52	25.97	12.23	5.86	3.64	3.44	0.89	0.18	8.27		(49.99)	13.55

=== Kaluga Oblast ===
Fieldwork date	Polling firm	Sample size	UR	CPRF	SRZP	LDPR	NP	RPPSJ	Others	Undecided	Abstention	Lead
12–14 Sep 2025	Regional election	–	58.56	9.48	7.88	9.53	5.46	5.71	–	–	(55.59)	49.03
21–24 Aug 2025	Russian Field	1,800	49.9	11.8	8.4	13.1	8.9	5.2	2.4	–	0.3	36.8
17–19 Sep 2021	Election result		36.33	22.02	10.81	9.44	8.05	4.26	9.09		(55.82)	14.31

=== Karachay-Cherkessia ===
Fieldwork date	Polling firm	Sample size	UR	CPRF	SRZP	LDPR	CP	Others	Undecided	Abstention	Lead
6–8 Sep 2024	Regional election	–	65.14	12.74	11.80	5.11	5.05	–	–	(31.93)	52.40
17–19 Sep 2021	Election result		80.06	13.02	2.01	1.88	0.52	2.51		(10.64)	67.04

=== Kemerovo Oblast ===
Fieldwork date	Polling firm	Sample size	UR	CPRF	LDPR	SRZP	NP	Others	Undecided	Abstention	Lead
8–10 Sep 2023	Regional election	–	69.42	8.87	9.30	5.41	5.36	–	–	(19.30)	60.12
17–19 Sep 2021	Election result		70.75	9.35	6.24	5.69	1.85	6.612		(26.49)	61.40

=== Khabarovsk Krai ===
Fieldwork date	Polling firm	Sample size	CPRF	UR	LDPR	NP	SRZP	RPPSJ	CR	Rodina	Others	Undecided	Abstention	Lead
6–8 Sep 2024	Regional election	–	12.59	45.93	16.75	5.35	7.32	4.07	2.01	0.89	–	–	(67.17)	29.18
17–19 Sep 2021	Election result		26.51	24.51	16.18	7.72	6.46	5.74	1.75	0.87	10.26		(55.69)	2.0

=== Khakassia ===
Fieldwork date	Polling firm	Sample size	UR	CPRF	NP	LDPR	SRZP	RPPSJ	CR	Yabloko	Others	Undecided	Abstention	Lead
8–10 Sep 2023	Regional election	–	36.41	39.11	3.99	7.17	3.33	3.17	2.85	–	–	–	(60.48)	2.70
19–24 Aug 2023	CIPKR	511	33	27	2	7	2	–	2	1	4	11	11	6
17–19 Sep 2021	Election result		33.36	29.85	9.85	8.02	6.58	2.90	1.91	0.64	9.79		(62.45)	3.51

=== Komi ===
Fieldwork date	Polling firm	Sample size	UR	CPRF	LDPR	NP	SRZP	CR	GA	Rodina	RPFJ	Others	Undecided	Abstention	Lead
12–14 Sep 2025	Regional election	–	44.50	14.87	14.11	5.96	7.07	3.61	3.86	0.96	1.75	–	–	(62.44)	29.63
18–22 Aug 2025	Russian Field	1,500	44.1	20.2	16.1	7.7	5.7	1.1	2.5	0.8	0.5	0.7	–	0.6	23.9
17–19 Sep 2021	Election result		29.44	26.88	11.96	9.57	8.33	1.45	1.34	0.95	0.84	9.24		(60.53)	2.56

=== Kostroma Oblast ===
Fieldwork date	Polling firm	Sample size	UR	CPRF	SRZP	LDPR	NP	RPPSJ	CR	Others	Undecided	Abstention	Lead
12–14 Sep 2025	Regional election	–	50.26	11.26	6.13	12.12	6.83	7.25	3.56	–	–	(60.28)	38.14
23–24 Aug 2025	Russian Field	1,500	44.2	15.2	6.3	16.0	8.4	7.5	1.2	0.8	–	0.4	28.2
17–19 Sep 2021	Election result		30.26	28.47	11.42	9.93	8.50	3.88	1.18	6.36		(60.46)	1.79

=== Krasnodar Krai ===
Fieldwork date	Polling firm	Sample size	UR	CPRF	SRZP	LDPR	NP	Others	Undecided	Abstention	Lead
9–11 Sep 2022	Regional election	–	70.80	10.76	5.78	6.63	4.86	–	–	(46.69)	35.51
17–19 Sep 2021	Election result		60.98	15.52	6.34	5.60	4.67	6.89		(13.39)	45.46

=== Kurgan Oblast ===
Fieldwork date	Polling firm	Sample size	UR	CPRF	LDPR	SRZP	NP	RPPSJ	Others	Undecided	Abstention	Lead
12–14 Sep 2025	Regional election	–	54.91	10.69	12.85	5.87	7.37	6.24	–	–	(61.68)	42.06
25 Aug – 3 Sep 2025	Russian Field	1,500	59.0	9.8	14.0	5.8	7.9	3.2	0.1	–	0.2	45.0
17–19 Sep 2021	Election result		36.07	23.45	11.78	10.51	6.61	4.17	7.41		(51.72)	12.62

=== Mari El ===
Fieldwork date	Polling firm	Sample size	CPRF	UR	LDPR	SRZP	NP	RPPSJ	CR	Others	Undecided	Abstention	Lead
6–8 Sep 2024	Regional election	–	11.57	61.23	8.65	4.86	4.35	4.12	3.77	–	–	(61.28)	49.66
23–30 Aug 2024	Russian Field	1,800	12.3	33.2	11.5	2.9	5.4	3.3	1.0	0.8	20.5	8.8	20.9
17–19 Sep 2021	Election result		36.30	33.43	7.49	6.48	6.15	2.64	1.21	6.30		(53.89)	2.87

=== Moscow ===
Fieldwork date	Polling firm	Sample size	UR	CPRF	SRZP	NP	LDPR	Yabloko	RPPSJ	Greens	RPFJ	GA	Rodina	PG	CR	CP	Others	Undecided	Abstention	Lead
2–23 Jul 2026 (Note: Only Orekhovo–Borisovo, Preobrazhensky, Tushino, Khovrino, Chertanovo and Solntsevo constituencies.)	Russian Field		42.5	15.8	5.6	13.7	9.7	5.3	2.8	1.8	–	–	0.9	–	1.3	–	0.6	–	–	26.7
2–23 Jul 2026	Russian Field	6,000	29.7	10.7	4.1	10.2	8.8	4	2.2	1.5	–	–	0.6	–	1	–	0.2	14.5	12.2	19
6 May – 13 Jun 2026	Russian Field	5,032	45.7	14.0	5.4	12.3	13.5	3.0	2.2	1.7	–	–	0.8	–	1.1	–	0.3	–	–	31.7
6 May – 13 Jun 2026	Russian Field	10,000	31.5	9.5	3.9	9.2	11	2.5	1.7	1.5	–	–	0.7	–	0.8	–	0.1	12.6	14.6	20.5
3–5 Aug 2023	Russian Field	1,000	42.9	7.6	4.7	5.5	8.2	3.4	–	–	–	–	–	–	–	–	0.2	10.9	15.1	34.7
9–21 Jun 2023	CIPKR	500	26	11	5	5	6	6	–	–	–	–	–	–	3	–	13	14	11	15
12–13 May 2023	Russian Field	1,000	45.2	8.5	5.1	4.3	8.6	4.0	–	–	–	–	–	–	–	–	0.6	12.2	10.7	36.6
24–26 Aug 2022	Russian Field	2,000	37.1	9.9	3.1	6.0	10.3	2.5	0.5	0.8	0.5	1.7	1.2	0.7	1.3	0.6	0.1	12.5	9.2	26.8
10–12 Aug 2022	Russian Field	2,000	37.5	9.4	4.6	5.0	8.2	2.9	1.1	0.8	1.0	1.5	0.4	0.6	1.1	1.2	0.4	12.2	11.1	28.1
27–29 Jul 2022	Russian Field	2,000	34.9	8.8	3.4	4.0	10.9	3.2	1.6	0.7	0.7	0.9	0.7	0.5	1.3	0.9	0.5	13.2	12.7	24.0
13–15 Jul 2022	Russian Field	2,000	32.9	10.1	4.6	4.2	9.0	2.9	1.2	1.1	1.1	0.8	0.6	0.6	0.6	0.8	0.7	12.7	13.2	22.8
29 Jun–1 Jul 2022	Russian Field	2,000	34.0	8.0	3.8	4.8	11.3	3.2	2.0	0.9	1.0	1.6	0.7	1.0	1.0	0.8	1.4	12.9	11.2	22.7
15–17 Jun 2022	Russian Field	2,000	36.5	9.5	3.8	4.7	10.4	3.9	1.4	1.2	0.7	1.0	0.8	0.6	1.4	0.9	1.1	10.2	10.7	26.1
4–6 Jun 2022	Russian Field	2,000	36	8	4	6	11	4	2	1	1	1	1	–	1	–	1	9	12	25
17–19 Sep 2021	Election result		36.97	22.67	7.34	7.09	7.08	4.90	2.85	2.40	1.97	1.75	1.22	1.11	1.10	0.27	–		(49.74)	14.30

=== Nenets Autonomous Okrug ===
Fieldwork date	Polling firm	Sample size	CPRF	UR	LDPR	SRZP	Greens	CR	Rodina	Others	Undecided	Abstention	Lead
8–10 Sep 2023	Regional election	–	24.76	43.94	9.93	4.51	2.95	5.71	5.67	–	–	(62.35)	19.18
17–19 Sep 2021	Election result		31.98	29.06	11.19	7.97	2.00	1.58	1.20	15.02		(57.39)	2.92

=== North Ossetia–Alania ===
Fieldwork date	Polling firm	Sample size	UR	CPRF	SRZP	LDPR	Rodina	Others	Undecided	Abstention	Lead
10–11 Sep 2022	Regional election	–	67.88	12.35	14.27	1.57	2.26	–	–	(31.03)	53.61
17–19 Sep 2021	Election result		71.12	11.49	10.54	1.43	0.73	4.69		(13.39)	59.63

=== Novosibirsk Oblast ===
Fieldwork date	Polling firm	Sample size	UR	CPRF	LDPR	NP	SRZP	RPPSJ	Greens	Rodina	Others	Undecided	Abstention	Lead
12–14 Sep 2025	Regional election	–	51.91	11.21	9.33	7.91	7.78	6.63	0.89	1.12	–	–	(66.98)	40.70
1–4 Sep 2025	Russian Field	1,800	45.9	13.4	13.0	11.4	5.7	7.0	1.8	0.6	0.8	–	0.4	32.5
17–19 Sep 2021	Election result		35.25	25.86	9.61	8.71	6.94	3.53	1.70	1.23	7.17		(62.26)	9.39

=== Oryol Oblast ===
Fieldwork date	Polling firm	Sample size	UR	CPRF	SRZP	LDPR	NP	CR	Yabloko	Others	Undecided	Abstention	Lead
28 Jul–2 Aug 2023	CIPKR	441	29	17	3	12	8	1	2	10	8	10	12
17–19 Sep 2021	Election result		38.83	21.86	10.16	8.80	5.99	1.94	0.77	11.65		(50.01)	16.97

=== Penza Oblast ===
Fieldwork date	Polling firm	Sample size	UR	CPRF	LDPR	SRZP	NP	RPPSJ	Others	Undecided	Abstention	Lead
9–11 Sep 2022	Regional election	–	74.91	8.53	5.59	3.30	2.88	3.51	–	–	(49.05)	66.38
17–19 Sep 2021	Election result		56.22	17.24	7.50	6.09	4.89	2.24	5.82		(42.48)	38.98

=== Rostov Oblast ===
Fieldwork date	Polling firm	Sample size	UR	CPRF	LDPR	SRZP	NP	CR	Others	Undecided	Abstention	Lead
8–10 Sep 2023	Regional election	–	68.28	11.47	6.92	4.81	3.79	3.27	–	–	(57.22)	56.81
17–19 Sep 2021	Election result		51.59	20.19	6.97	6.42	5.17	1.39	8.27		(51.20)	31.40

=== Ryazan Oblast ===
Fieldwork date	Polling firm	Sample size	UR	CPRF	LDPR	SRZP	NP	RPPSJ	Rodina	Others	Undecided	Abstention	Lead
12–14 Sep 2025	Regional election	–	72.85	6.39	7.96	2.53	4.14	3.18	DNP	1.79 (Note: Communists of Russia 1.08%, The Greens 0.71%)	–	(54.65)	64.89
14–19 Aug 2022	Russian Field	2,084	42.6	9.1	10.1	8.5	7.3	2.5	2.2	1.0	9.4	5.9	32.5
17–19 Sep 2021	Election result		47.79	19.99	9.13	8.22	5.89	2.63	0.54	5.81		(51.97)	27.80

=== Sakha ===
Fieldwork date	Polling firm	Sample size	CPRF	UR	NP	SRZP	LDPR	Rodina	CP	Others	Undecided	Abstention	Lead
8–10 Sep 2023	Regional election	–	13.16	54.36	14.17	9.39	5.39	1.02		–	–	(51.70)	40.19
17–19 Sep 2021	Election result		35.15	33.22	9.87	8.19	5.14	0.34	0.24	7.85		(48.77)	1.93

=== Sakhalin Oblast ===
Fieldwork date	Polling firm	Sample size	UR	CPRF	NP	LDPR	SRZP	RPPSJ	CR	Rodina	RPFJ	Others	Undecided	Abstention	Lead
9–11 Sep 2022	Regional election	–	47.20	14.25	8.89	9.19	5.14	6.70	2.55	0.72	1.46	–	–	(70.33)	32.95
17–19 Sep 2021	Election result		35.73	28.63	9.07	8.89	5.20	2.71	1.86	0.94	0.88	6.09		(60.06)	7.1

=== Saratov Oblast ===
Fieldwork date	Polling firm	Sample size	UR	CPRF	LDPR	SRZP	NP	CR	Rodina	Others	Undecided	Abstention	Lead
9–11 Sep 2022	Regional election	–	60.50	14.35	9.24	6.79	3.54	2.96	1.61	–	–	(46.31)	46.15
17–19 Sep 2021	Election result		59.84	20.74	5.15	4.10	2.85	1.04	0.46	5.82		(44.29)	39.10

=== Smolensk Oblast ===
Fieldwork date	Polling firm	Sample size	UR	CPRF	LDPR	SRZP	NP	RPPSJ	CR	Greens	Others	Undecided	Abstention	Lead
8–10 Sep 2023	Regional election	–	57.39	9.83	11.25	4.32	4.21	4.56	4.05	1.13	–	–	(66.32)	46.14
17–19 Sep 2021	Election result		39.94	22.81	11.25	7.58	5.97	3.44	1.79	0.76	6.46		(58.13)	17.13

=== Stavropol Krai ===
Fieldwork date	Polling firm	Sample size	UR	CPRF	SRZP	LDPR	NP	Others	Undecided	Abstention	Lead
1–6 Sep 2025	Russian Field	1,200	52.9	14.2	5.7	11.6	14.3	1.0	–	0.3	38.6
17–19 Sep 2021	Election result		61.83	14.92	9.30	4.79	2.63	6.53		(32.88)	46.91

=== Sverdlovsk Oblast ===
Fieldwork date	Polling firm	Sample size	UR	CPRF	SRZP	LDPR	NP	RPPSJ	Yabloko	CR	Others	Undecided	Abstention	Lead
30 Aug–3 Sep 2022	Russian Field	1,033	39.3	10.6	6.6	8.2	8.3	1.9	1.7	1.1	2.0	14.2	5.3	28.7
17–19 Sep 2021	Election result		34.71	21.31	12.85	8.59	8.23	3.08	2.13	2.02	7.08		(51.53)	13.40

=== Tatarstan ===
Fieldwork date	Polling firm	Sample size	UR	CPRF	LDPR	SRZP	NP	Others	Undecided	Abstention	Lead
8 Sep 2024	Regional election	–	76.75	10.54	4.41	3.27	4.21	–	–	(28.42)	66.21
17–19 Sep 2021	Election result		79.01	9.64	2.82	2.69	1.01	4.83		(21.08)	69.37

=== Tula Oblast ===
Fieldwork date	Polling firm	Sample size	UR	CPRF	SRZP	LDPR	NP	RPPSJ	CR	Others	Undecided	Abstention	Lead
6–8 Sep 2024	Regional election	–	58.71	13.20	7.57	9.74	4.16	4.45		–	–	(50.53)	45.51
24–29 Aug 2024	Russian Field	1,800	40.9	6.6	4.9	9.8	6.2	5.8	–	1.5	14.8	8.9	31.1
17–19 Sep 2021	Election result		52.88	16.85	7.49	6.61	5.44	3.09	1.20	6.44		(46.83)	36.03

=== Tuva ===
Fieldwork date	Polling firm	Sample size	UR	CPRF	SRZP	NP	LDPR	Others	Undecided	Abstention	Lead
8 Sep 2024	Regional election	–	80.01	5.47	3.29	5.41	5.04	–	–	(41.14)	74.54
17–19 Sep 2021	Election result		85.34	4.20	3.00	2.28	1.82	3.36		(16.72)	81.14

=== Udmurtia ===
Fieldwork date	Polling firm	Sample size	UR	CPRF	LDPR	SRZP	NP	RPPSJ	GA	Rodina	Others	Undecided	Abstention	Lead
9–11 Sep 2022	Regional election	–	51.07	15.56	13.64	6.06	4.14	4.68	1.17	0.68	–	–	(60.21)	35.51
15–20 Aug 2022	INSOMAR	1,000	53	14	11	6	3	13						39
17–19 Sep 2021	Election result		35.63	25.31	9.64	9.19	7.37	4.41	0.82	0.81	6.82		(52.55)	10.32

=== Ulyanovsk Oblast ===
Fieldwork date	Polling firm	Sample size	UR	CPRF	LDPR	NP	SRZP	CR	Yabloko	Others	Undecided	Abstention	Lead
8–10 Sep 2023	Regional election	–	49.91	15.96	13.56	4.48	5.15	7.52	–	–	–	(65.35)	33.95
20–25 Aug 2023	CIPKR	538	35	17	11	3	3	1	3	6	10	12	18
17–19 Sep 2021	Election result		39.03	33.14	7.40	5.36	5.00	1.71	0.54	7.82		(54.12)	5.89

=== Vladimir Oblast ===
Fieldwork date	Polling firm	Sample size	UR	CPRF	LDPR	SRZP	NP	RPPSJ	CR	Yabloko	Others	Undecided	Abstention	Lead
8–10 Sep 2023	Regional election	–	55.47	14.02	10.39	6.63	4.83	6.06		–	–	–	(75.27)	41.45
1–5 Sep 2022	CIPKR	505	32	14	10	5	3	–	3	2	7	10	14	18
17–19 Sep 2021	Election result		37.64	25.94	9.42	7.78	7.31	3.09	1.11	1.05	6.66		(62.11)	11.70

=== Volgograd Oblast ===
Fieldwork date	Polling firm	Sample size	UR	CPRF	LDPR	SRZP	NP	RPPSJ	Others	Undecided	Abstention	Lead
6–8 Sep 2024	Regional election	–	52.44	12.44	12.99	5.50	5.17	5.12	–	–	(38.30)	36.00
17–26 Aug 2024	Russian Field	1,500	33.8	10.0	10.3	4.3	6.1	4.2	1.1	16.3	13.7	23.5
17–19 Sep 2021	Election result		58.43	14.77	11.12	5.77	3.01	2.11	4.79		(35.03)	43.66

=== Voronezh Oblast ===
Fieldwork date	Polling firm	Sample size	UR	CPRF	LDPR	SRZP	NP	Rodina	Others	Undecided	Abstention	Lead
12–14 Sep 2025	Regional election	–	73.88	9.26	5.80	2.24	5.67	1.61	–	–	(45.19)	64.62
20–22 Aug 2025	Russian Field	1,800	52.8	13.1	13.1	6.5	10.8	1.8	1.3	–	0.6	39.7
17–19 Sep 2021	Election result		55.89	19.51	6.05	5.21	5.07	1.61	6.66		(46.14)	36.38

=== Yaroslavl Oblast ===
Fieldwork date	Polling firm	Sample size	UR	CPRF	SRZP	LDPR	NP	RPPSJ	CR	Others	Undecided	Abstention	Lead
8–10 Sep 2023	Regional election	–	46.60	11.27	11.19	11.14	7.39	5.62	4.50	–	–	(72.65)	35.33
17–19 Sep 2021	Election result		29.72	22.74	19.20	8.97	7.86	2.94	1.20	7.37		(56.60)	6.98

=== Zabaykalsky Krai ===
Fieldwork date	Polling firm	Sample size	UR	CPRF	LDPR	NP	SRZP	CR	Rodina	Others	Undecided	Abstention	Lead
8–10 Sep 2023	Regional election	–	56.94	9.85	15.64	4.12	6.29	2.03	2.01	–	–	(46.31)	41.30
17–19 Sep 2021	Election result		38.66	20.00	12.15	9.36	8.34	1.92	0.66	8.91		(60.65)	18.66

=== Occupied territories of Ukraine ===
Four Ukrainian oblasts – Donetsk, Kherson, Luhansk, and Zaporizhzhia were unilaterally annexed by Russia on 30 September 2022 after internationally unrecognized referendums held days prior, which were organized by Russian occupation authorities in territories where hostilities were ongoing and much of the population had fled.

==== Donetsk People's Republic ====
Fieldwork date	Polling firm	Sample size	UR	CPRF	LDPR	SRZP	NP	Others	Undecided	Abstention	Lead
1–2 Aug 2023	WCIOM	1,000	69	3	7	3	1	0	17	0	62

==== Kherson Oblast ====
Fieldwork date	Polling firm	Sample size	UR	CPRF	LDPR	SRZP	NP	Others	Undecided	Abstention	Lead
1–2 Aug 2023	WCIOM	1,000	68	6	3	3	1	0	19	0	62

==== Luhansk People's Republic ====
Fieldwork date	Polling firm	Sample size	UR	CPRF	LDPR	SRZP	NP	Others	Undecided	Abstention	Lead
1–2 Aug 2023	WCIOM	1,000	73	4	6	2	1	0	14	0	67

==== Zaporizhzhia Oblast ====
Fieldwork date	Polling firm	Sample size	UR	CPRF	LDPR	SRZP	NP	Others	Undecided	Abstention	Lead
1–2 Aug 2023	WCIOM	1,000	80	3	2	3	1	0	11	0	77
