= Wartime internet restrictions in Russia (2025–present) =

Internet censorship and restrictions in Russia

Internet restrictions in Russia began in May 2025 and have become a regular occurrence. In June 2025, there were 655 internet shutdowns recorded in the country, and by July, this figure had risen to 2,099, exceeding the number of shutdowns worldwide for the entire year. Government agencies cited protection against drones controlled via mobile internet as the reason for the restrictions. As of July, problems were observed in all regions of the country, even those far from the borders and out of reach of drones.

Users reported only being able to access Russian resources, while any foreign platforms using CDN services such as Cloudflare and Amazon stopped loading. The phenomenon quickly gained popularity on runet and the government-friendly segment of offered services became a meme colloquially known as Cheburnet, a portmanteau of the name of the "Soviet Mickey Mouse" cartoon character Cheburashka and "internet".

== Background ==
Mass internet shutdowns are organized under various pretexts. In 2019, during protests in Moscow over the exclusion of opposition candidates from the Moscow City Duma elections, protesters experienced disruptions in mobile internet service. Human rights activists described this event as the “first state shutdown.” With the start of the conflict in Ukraine, some of these disruptions occurred in Russian-controlled territories in Ukraine due to the actions of Russian troops on telecommunications infrastructure.

The first regional shutdowns began in May 2025, on the eve of Victory Day, with mobile communications unavailable in more than 40 regions. The outages were justified by the need to ensure security at the events taking place. After Russia Day, the problem became widespread. According to the “On the Line” project, 655 mobile internet outages were recorded in June. In May, there were only 69 such cases. In some regions, mobile communications were down for several days in a row. Almost 80% of the country's territory was at least temporarily without mobile internet.

In June 2025, Russian deputies proposed launching an SMS notification system to inform the population about mobile internet outages. The request was made by the deputies to the head of the Ministry of Digital Development, Communications and Mass Media, Maksut Shadayev.

=== Related events ===
On June 24, Russian President Vladimir Putin signed a decree establishing a digital service in Russia that includes national messenger Max. On June 30, the service's press office announced that the platform had registered its first million users.

State Duma deputy Sergei Boyarsky stated that after the creation of a national messenger service in Russia, the authorities may tighten penalties for foreign platforms for non-compliance with legislation.

In 2026, seven Russian banks moved to using TLS certificates signed by a Russian government-run certificate authority (CA), thus requiring users of those banks to configure their web browsers to trust the government-run CA. While this allows the banks to operate independently of western boycotts of Russian banks, it also has the side effect of allowing the Russian government to intercept or impersonate any website on the internet.

== Opinions ==
The director of the Internet Protection Society notes that «the main navigation system for drones is based on GPS. However, in large areas, it is impossible to completely ensure stable internet access or reliably jam GPS signals, so modern drones use a combination of various inertial guidance systems that are corrected by other means. Drones can continue to fly along a given trajectory even without the internet».

Human Rights Watch describes the situation as another step toward control and isolation, creating a “piecemeal internet” under complete state surveillance. The state's strategy is gradually restricting freedoms and bringing Russia closer to China's “Great Firewall” model. According to statements by Access Now and other organizations involved in the protection of digital rights, such shutdowns, imposed without public oversight or legal justification, violate fundamental human rights.

The shutdowns are occurring in regions that are far from the conflict zone in Ukraine and beyond the reach of unmanned aerial vehicles, raising questions about the proportionality and true motives behind such measures.

Technology experts note that Russian authorities have switched to the widespread use of Deep Packet Inspection technology.

By the end of 2024, the system had already been tested several times in “exercises” involving disconnection from the global internet. — This information was confirmed in reports by NetBlocks and Access Now.

== Consequences ==
The internet shutdown across Russia sparked thousands of complaints from residents in various regions, disrupting daily life and causing public outcry. During the restrictions, there were problems with the operation of messengers, lack of access to banking applications, food ordering applications and services, taxis, and marketplaces. Users reported interruptions in voice communication, failures in sending SMS messages, and problems with navigation. The problems are particularly serious in rural areas.

The restrictions affected taxi services: drivers encountered difficulties completing orders and were forced to call customer support, which increased the cost of the trip. According to passengers, there were difficulties paying for tickets via mobile apps on electric trains, and ticket inspectors reported that they were temporarily only accepting cash payments.

According to TechRadar estimates for July, the economic damage caused by Internet outages amounted to approximately 26 billion rubles (~$290 million).
