= 2026 Adygean legislative election =

Regional legislative election in Russia

- 18–20 September 2026

All 50 seats in the State Council 26 seats needed for a majority
- Turnout: 79.16% ▲11.86 pp
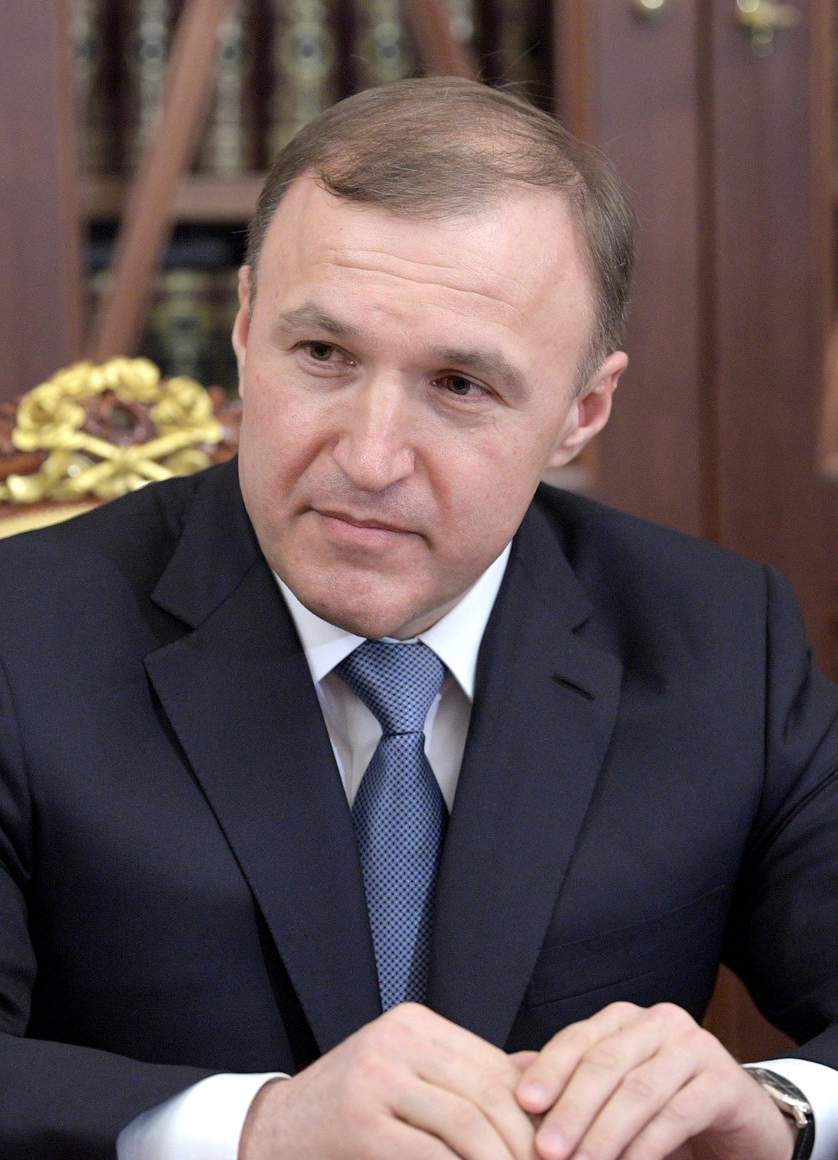

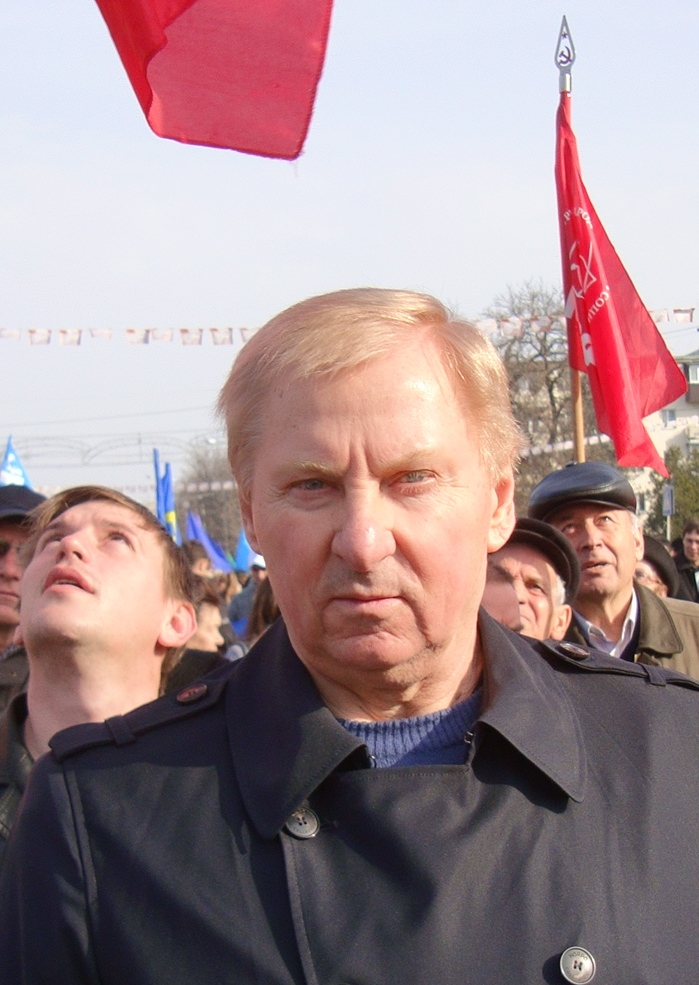

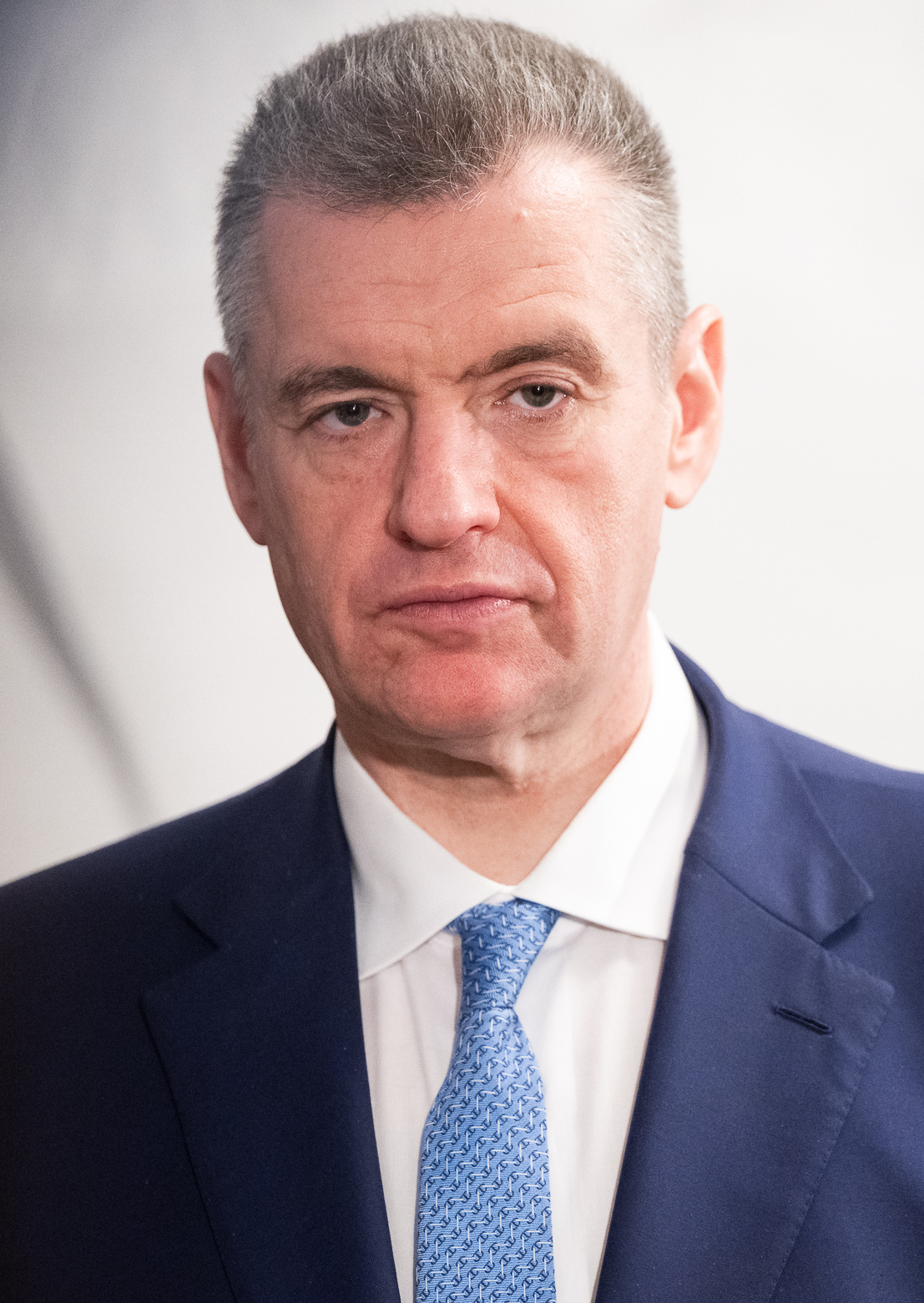
	Majority party	Minority party	Third party
Candidate	Murat Kumpilov	Yevgeny Salov	Leonid Slutsky
Party	United Russia	CPRF	LDPR
Last election	66.73%, 40 seats	17.65%, 5 seats	7.74%, 3 seats
Seats won	42	3	3
Seat change	▲2	▼2	Steady
Popular vote	175,338	31,479	23,276
Percentage	65.69%	11.79%	8.72%
Swing	▼1.04 pp	▼5.86 pp	▲0.98 pp
	Fourth party	Fifth party	Sixth party
	SR	NL	CPCR
Candidate	Albert Osmanov	Ruslan Tlyustangelov	Aleksandr Kovalenko
Party	A Just Russia	New People	Communists of Russia
Last election	6.14%, 1 seat	Failed to qualify	0 seats
Seats won	1	1	0
Seat change	Steady	Failed to qualify	Steady
Popular vote	15,147	14,525	3,820
Percentage	5.68%	5.44%	1.43%
Swing	▼0.46 pp	Failed to qualify	Did not participate
Chairman before election
Vladimir Narozhny
United Russia
Elected Chairman
Pavel Statsenko
United Russia
Senator before election
Murat Khapsirokov
United Russia
Senator after election
Murat Khapsirokov
United Russia

The 2026 State Council of the Republic of Adygea election took place on 18–20 September 2026, on common election day, coinciding with the 2026 Russian legislative election. All 50 seats in the State Council were up for re-election.

United Russia slightly increased its overwhelming majority in the State Council, winning 66% of the vote and 24 single-mandate constituencies. Communist Party of the Russian Federation finished second but lost two seats. New People entered the State Council for the first time, winning one party-list seat.

== Electoral system ==
Under current election laws, the State Council is elected for a term of five years, with parallel voting. 25 seats are elected by party-list proportional representation with a 5% electoral threshold, with the other half elected in 25 single-member constituencies by first-past-the-post voting. Seats in the proportional part are allocated using the Imperiali quota, modified to ensure that every party list, which passes the threshold, receives at least one mandate.

== Candidates ==
=== Party lists ===
To register regional lists of candidates, parties need to collect 0.5% of signatures of all registered voters in Adygea.

The following parties were relieved from the necessity to collect signatures:

- United Russia
- Communist Party of the Russian Federation
- Liberal Democratic Party of Russia
- A Just Russia
- New People

№	Party	Republic-wide list	Candidates	Territorial groups	Status
1	A Just Russia	Albert Osmanov • Yevgeny Sinitsyn	52	25	Registered
2	United Russia	Murat Kumpilov • Eduard Tseyev • Tatyana Ovsyannikova	102	25	Registered
3	Communists of Russia	Aleksandr Kovalenko	46	22	Registered
4	Communist Party	Yevgeny Salov • Yelena Moskalenko • Skhatbiy Shevotsukov	57	25	Registered
5	Liberal Democratic Party	Leonid Slutsky • Kaplan Panesh • Tembot Shovgenov	76	25	Registered
6	New People	Ruslan Tlyustangelov • Artyom Gusakov • Viktoria Mardirosyan	50	17	Registered

Communists of Russia participated in the Adygean legislative election for the first time since 2016 after fielding only single-mandate constituency candidates in 2021.

=== Single-mandate constituencies ===
25 single-mandate constituencies were formed in Adygea. To register candidates in single-mandate constituencies need to collect 3% of signatures of registered voters in the constituency.

Number of candidates in single-mandate constituencies
Party	Candidates	
Party	Nominated	Registered
United Russia	25	25
Communist Party	25	25
Liberal Democratic Party	25	24
A Just Russia	22	22
New People	6	6
Independent	4	0
Total	107	102

== Results ==
=== Results by party lists ===
Summary of the 18–20 September 2026 State Council of the Republic of Adygea election results
Party	Party list					Constituency		Total	
Party	Votes	%	±pp	Seats	+/–	Seats	+/–	Seats	+/–
United Russia	175,338	65.69	▼1.04	18	Steady	24	▲2	42	▲2
Communist Party	31,479	11.79	▼5.86	3	▼1	0	▼1	3	▼2
Liberal Democratic Party	23,276	8.72	▲0.98	2	Steady	1	Steady	3	Steady
A Just Russia	15,147	5.68	▼0.46	1	Steady	0	Steady	1	Steady
New People	14,525	5.44	New	1	New	0	New	1	New
Communists of Russia	3,820	1.43	New	0	New	–	–	0	Steady
Invalid ballots	3,317	1.24	▼0.49	—	—	—	—	—	—
Total	266,902	100.00	—	25	Steady	25	Steady	50	Steady
Turnout	266,902	79.16	▲11.86	—	—	—	—	—	—
Registered voters	337,176	100.00	—	—	—	—	—	—	—

Former Chairman of the Accounts and Control Chamber of Adygea Pavel Statsenko (United Russia) was elected Chairman of the State Council, replacing outgoing Chairman Vladimir Narozhny (United Russia). Incumbent Senator Murat Khapsirokov (United Russia) was re-appointed to the Federation Council.

=== Results in single-member constituencies ===
==== District 1 ====
Summary of the 18–20 September 2026 State Council of the Republic of Adygea election in District 1
Candidate	Party	Votes	%
Aslan Dzhankhot (incumbent)	United Russia	8,066	74.46%
Adam Natok	Liberal Democratic Party	1,666	15.38%
Aliy Kazanchi	Communist Party	695	6.42%
Saida Gadagatel	A Just Russia	378	3.49%
Total		10,832	100%

==== District 2 ====
Summary of the 18–20 September 2026 State Council of the Republic of Adygea election in District 2
Candidate	Party	Votes	%
Aleksandr Kupin (incumbent)	United Russia	6,197	58.68%
Irina Viklenko (incumbent)	Communist Party	2,813	26.64%
Nadezhda Sevruk	A Just Russia	724	6.86%
Natalia Shiyanova	Liberal Democratic Party	482	4.56%
Total		10,560	100%

==== District 3 ====
Summary of the 18–20 September 2026 State Council of the Republic of Adygea election in District 3
Candidate	Party	Votes	%
Kaplan Borsov	United Russia	8,765	81.25%
Saida Kadakoyeva	Communist Party	1,023	9.48%
Khazret Khatkov	Liberal Democratic Party	807	7.48%
Ksenia Krasilnikova	A Just Russia	161	1.49%
Total		10,788	100%

==== District 4 ====
Summary of the 18–20 September 2026 State Council of the Republic of Adygea election in District 4
Candidate	Party	Votes	%
Mukhamed Ashev (incumbent)	United Russia	9,061	84.44%
Skhatbiy Vorokov	Communist Party	919	8.56%
Anzor Kankulov	Liberal Democratic Party	577	5.38%
Vyacheslav Udzhukhu	A Just Russia	128	1.19%
Total		10,731	100%

==== District 5 ====
Summary of the 18–20 September 2026 State Council of the Republic of Adygea election in District 5
Candidate	Party	Votes	%
Irina Lyashenko (incumbent)	United Russia	7,535	78.77%
Zaur Gogunokov	Liberal Democratic Party	728	7.61%
Viktor Nefedov	Communist Party	650	6.79%
Olga Yanbukhtina	A Just Russia	603	6.30%
Total		9,566	100%

==== District 6 ====
Summary of the 18–20 September 2026 State Council of the Republic of Adygea election in District 6
Candidate	Party	Votes	%
Azamat Pchikhachev (incumbent)	United Russia	8,974	76.84%
Yulia Bryukhanova	A Just Russia	977	8.37%
Sultan Bzhetsev	Liberal Democratic Party	879	7.53%
Aleksandr Trofimov	Communist Party	812	6.95%
Total		11,679	100%

==== District 7 ====
Summary of the 18–20 September 2026 State Council of the Republic of Adygea election in District 7
Candidate	Party	Votes	%
Vyacheslav Sapiyev (incumbent)	United Russia	5,749	68.04%
Nikita Starkov	Communist Party	1,145	13.55%
Yevgeny Sinitsyn	A Just Russia	739	8.75%
Aslan Khatsukov	Liberal Democratic Party	674	7.98%
Total		8,449	100%

==== District 8 ====
Summary of the 18–20 September 2026 State Council of the Republic of Adygea election in District 8
Candidate	Party	Votes	%
Pavel Statsenko	United Russia	6,687	66.74%
Rashid Tsakhayev	New People	954	9.52%
Galim Tazov	Communist Party	878	8.76%
Yury Gornostalev	Liberal Democratic Party	659	6.58%
Viktor Putyatin	A Just Russia	551	5.50%
Total		10,019	100%

==== District 9 ====
Summary of the 18–20 September 2026 State Council of the Republic of Adygea election in District 9
Candidate	Party	Votes	%
Yury Gorokhov (incumbent)	United Russia	4,925	53.08%
Nikolay Yuryev	Communist Party	1,241	13.37%
Rustem Kokhuzhev	A Just Russia	1,164	12.54%
Zurab Yedgulov	New People	967	10.42%
Igor Proshchenko	Liberal Democratic Party	678	7.31%
Total		9,279	100%

==== District 10 ====
Summary of the 18–20 September 2026 State Council of the Republic of Adygea election in District 10
Candidate	Party	Votes	%
Murat Panesh	Liberal Democratic Party	5,651	60.28%
Ivan Govorkov	United Russia	1,514	16.15%
Vladimir Stasev	Communist Party	1,276	13.61%
Maria Novarchuk	A Just Russia	723	7.71%
Total		9,374	100%

==== District 11 ====
Summary of the 18–20 September 2026 State Council of the Republic of Adygea election in District 11
Candidate	Party	Votes	%
Aleksey Koreshkin	United Russia	6,881	67.20%
Asker Apishev	Communist Party	1,234	12.05%
Vladislav Golovin	New People	1,075	10.50%
Nazret Baikulova	Liberal Democratic Party	752	7.34%
Total		10,240	100%

==== District 12 ====
Summary of the 18–20 September 2026 State Council of the Republic of Adygea election in District 12
Candidate	Party	Votes	%
Aleksey Samokvitov	United Russia	7,375	69.56%
Dmitry Khokhlov	Communist Party	1,536	14.49%
Natalya Bulayeva	Liberal Democratic Party	1,375	12.97%
Total		10,602	100%

==== District 13 ====
Summary of the 18–20 September 2026 State Council of the Republic of Adygea election in District 13
Candidate	Party	Votes	%
Saida Kuizheva (incumbent)	United Russia	4,417	59.55%
Yelena Shpirko	Communist Party	1,432	19.31%
Natalya Kucherova	Liberal Democratic Party	803	10.83%
Nalbiy Vozdamirov	A Just Russia	487	6.57%
Total		7,417	100%

==== District 14 ====
Summary of the 18–20 September 2026 State Council of the Republic of Adygea election in District 14
Candidate	Party	Votes	%
Sergey Pogodin (incumbent)	United Russia	6,145	68.46%
Dmitry Tereshchenko	Communist Party	1,312	14.62%
Fatima Gunchekova	Liberal Democratic Party	786	8.76%
Maksim Kryuk	A Just Russia	598	6.66%
Total		8,976	100%

==== District 15 ====
Summary of the 18–20 September 2026 State Council of the Republic of Adygea election in District 15
Candidate	Party	Votes	%
Vladimir Trostenetsky (incumbent)	United Russia	7,124	67.44%
Svetlana Kimnatnaya	Communist Party	1,369	12.96%
Aliy Bezrukov	Liberal Democratic Party	1,124	10.64%
Aleksey Konishchev	A Just Russia	684	6.48%
Total		10,563	100%

==== District 16 ====
Summary of the 18–20 September 2026 State Council of the Republic of Adygea election in District 16
Candidate	Party	Votes	%
Vladimir Ivanchenko	United Russia	7,291	67.56%
Yelena Moskalenko	Communist Party	1,467	13.59%
Artyom Gusakov	New People	745	6.90%
Irina Bogus	Liberal Democratic Party	666	6.17%
Viktoria Nazheva	A Just Russia	294	2.72%
Total		10,792	100%

==== District 17 ====
Summary of the 18–20 September 2026 State Council of the Republic of Adygea election in District 17
Candidate	Party	Votes	%
Valery Kartamyshev	United Russia	8,934	78.02%
Sergey Romanenko	Communist Party	694	6.06%
Yevgeny Konovalov	A Just Russia	633	5.53%
Diana Mukova	Liberal Democratic Party	531	4.64%
Samvel Simonyan	New People	483	4.22%
Total		11,451	100%

==== District 18 ====
Summary of the 18–20 September 2026 State Council of the Republic of Adygea election in District 18
Candidate	Party	Votes	%
Aleksandr Kolesnikov (incumbent)	United Russia	7,763	73.95%
Tatyana Bezusko	Communist Party	1,550	14.76%
Yury Bolokov	Liberal Democratic Party	588	5.60%
Boris Cheuzhev	A Just Russia	323	3.08%
Total		10,498	100%

==== District 19 ====
Summary of the 18–20 September 2026 State Council of the Republic of Adygea election in District 19
Candidate	Party	Votes	%
Vyacheslav Dzhaste (incumbent)	United Russia	8,713	73.87%
Dmitry Kochetov	Communist Party	1,382	11.72%
Murat Nash	A Just Russia	989	8.38%
Aleksey Steshenko	Liberal Democratic Party	583	4.94%
Total		11,795	100%

==== District 20 ====
Summary of the 18–20 September 2026 State Council of the Republic of Adygea election in District 20
Candidate	Party	Votes	%
Nurdin Chermit	United Russia	8,242	70.50%
Vyacheslav Trakhov	Communist Party	1,720	14.71%
Anastasia Breusova	Liberal Democratic Party	1,060	9.07%
Zoya Muradova	A Just Russia	603	5.16%
Total		11,691	100%

==== District 21 ====
Summary of the 18–20 September 2026 State Council of the Republic of Adygea election in District 21
Candidate	Party	Votes	%
Asker Dzetl (incumbent)	United Russia	9,210	76.74%
Igor Mironchuk	Communist Party	1,158	9.65%
Yevgeny Grunin	Liberal Democratic Party	1,039	8.66%
Dmitry Knyazko	New People	529	4.41%
Total		12,002	100%

==== District 22 ====
Summary of the 18–20 September 2026 State Council of the Republic of Adygea election in District 22
Candidate	Party	Votes	%
Kazbek Khurum	United Russia	10,003	76.34%
Igor Kosov	Communist Party	1,257	9.59%
Nikolay Tkachev	Liberal Democratic Party	1,138	8.68%
Aznaur Tkhaganov	A Just Russia	624	4.76%
Total		13,104	100%

==== District 23 ====
Summary of the 18–20 September 2026 State Council of the Republic of Adygea election in District 23
Candidate	Party	Votes	%
Gissa Baste (incumbent)	United Russia	9,099	79.50%
Rashid Udzhukhu	Communist Party	1,626	14.21%
Aleksandr Popov	A Just Russia	669	5.85%
Total		11,445	100%

==== District 24 ====
Summary of the 18–20 September 2026 State Council of the Republic of Adygea election in District 24
Candidate	Party	Votes	%
Yury Khabakhu	United Russia	11,549	94.29%
Asiyet Mugu	Communist Party	315	2.57%
Rustam Kushu	A Just Russia	248	2.02%
Adam Tlishev	Liberal Democratic Party	133	1.09%
Total		12,249	100%

==== District 25 ====
Summary of the 18–20 September 2026 State Council of the Republic of Adygea election in District 25
Candidate	Party	Votes	%
Murat Kagazezhev	United Russia	8,497	69.72%
Kaplan Khuazhev	Communist Party	1,277	10.48%
Vyacheslav Seleznev	Liberal Democratic Party	1,233	10.12%
Oleg Sergiyenko	A Just Russia	1,131	9.28%
Total		12,188	100%

=== Members ===
Incumbent deputies are highlighted with bold, elected members who declined to take a seat are marked with ~~strikethrough~~.

Constituency
No.	Member	Party
1	Aslan Dzhankhot	United Russia
2	Aleksandr Kupin	United Russia
3	Kaplan Borsov	United Russia
4	Mukhamed Ashev	United Russia
5	Irina Lyashenko	United Russia
6	Azamat Pchikhachev	United Russia
7	Vyacheslav Sapiyev	United Russia
8	Pavel Statsenko	United Russia
9	Yury Gorokhov	United Russia
10	Murat Panesh	Liberal Democratic Party
11	Aleksey Koreshkin	United Russia
12	Aleksey Samokvitov	United Russia
13	Saida Kuizheva	United Russia
14	Sergey Pogodin	United Russia
15	Vladimir Trostenetsky	United Russia
16	Vladimir Ivanchenko	United Russia
17	Valery Kartamyshev	United Russia
18	Aleksandr Kolesnikov	United Russia
19	Vyacheslav Dzhaste	United Russia
20	Nurdin Chermit	United Russia
21	Asker Dzetl	United Russia
22	Kazbek Khurum	United Russia
23	Gissa Baste	United Russia
24	Yury Khabakhu	United Russia
25	Murat Kagazezhev	United Russia

Party lists
Member	Party
~~Murat Kumpilov~~	United Russia
Eduard Tseyev	United Russia
Tatyana Ovsyannikova	United Russia
Aliy Psheuch	United Russia
Murat Khapsirokov	United Russia
Yury Barkov	United Russia
Rustam Bedzhashe	United Russia
Igor Aleksandrin	United Russia
Musardin Blyagoz	United Russia
Alla Chernyshova	United Russia
Adam Barcho	United Russia
Zurab Zekhov	United Russia
Murat Shkhalakhov	United Russia
Adam Mugu	United Russia
Aleksandr Bulgakov	United Russia
Azamat Mamkhegov	United Russia
Yelena Kudryavtseva	United Russia
Roman Chumakov	United Russia
Lyubov Anannikova	United Russia
Yevgeny Salov	Communist Party
Yelena Moskalenko	Communist Party
Skhatbiy Shevotsukov	Communist Party
~~Leonid Slutsky~~	Liberal Democratic Party
~~Kaplan Panesh~~	Liberal Democratic Party
Tembot Shovgenov	Liberal Democratic Party
Yury Gornostalev	Liberal Democratic Party
Albert Osmanov	A Just Russia
Ruslan Tlyustangelov	New People

== See also ==
- 2026 Russian regional elections
