= 2026 Tambov Oblast legislative election =

Regional legislative election in Russia

- 18–20 September 2026

All 50 seats in the Oblast Duma 26 seats needed for a majority
- Turnout: 59.56% ▲0.96 pp
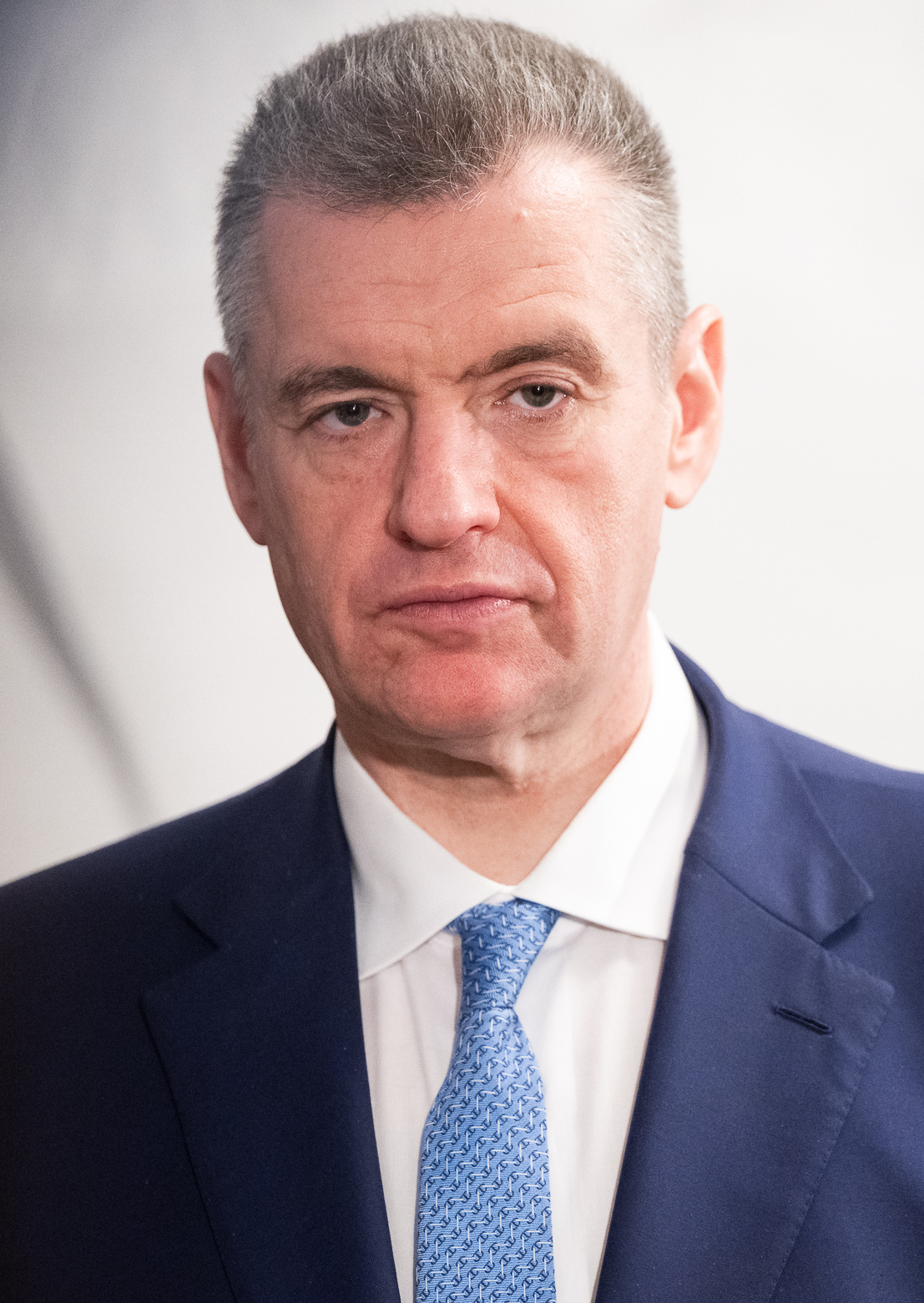
	Majority party	Minority party	Third party
	ER	CPRF
Candidate	Ivan Boldyrev	Andrey Zhidkov	Leonid Slutsky
Party	United Russia	CPRF	LDPR
Last election	57.91%, 42 seats	15.63%, 3 seats	5.27%, 1 seat
Seats won	44	3	1
Seat change	▲2	Steady	Steady
Popular vote	295,873	61,489	31,347
Percentage	65.07%	13.52%	6.89%
Swing	▲7.16 pp	▼2.11 pp	▲1.62 pp
	Fourth party	Fifth party	Sixth party
	NL	SR	Rodina
Candidate	Aleksey Konstantinov	Pavel Plotnikov	Yelena Leonova
Party	New People	A Just Russia	Rodina
Last election	Did not participate	6.59%, 1 seat	12.68%, 3 seats
Seats won	1	1	0
Seat change	Did not participate	Steady	▼3
Popular vote	25,005	24,694	10,287
Percentage	5.50%	5.43%	2.26%
Swing	Did not participate	▼1.16 pp	▼10.42 pp
Chairman before election
Yevgeny Matushkin
United Russia
Elected Chairman
Aleksey Pozdnyakov
United Russia
Senator before election
Aleksandr Nikitin
United Russia
Senator after election
Aleksey Puchnin
Independent (Note: elected on the United Russia party list)

The 2026 Tambov Oblast Duma election took place on 18–20 September 2026, on common election day, coinciding with the 2026 Russian legislative election. All 50 seats in the Oblast Duma were up for re-election.

United Russia slightly increased its overwhelming majority in the Oblast Duma, winning 65.1% of the vote and all 25 single-mandate constituencies. New People entered the Oblast Duma for the first time, while Rodina suffered major defeat, losing more than 10 percentage points and all three seats.

== Electoral system ==
Under current election laws, the Oblast Duma is elected for a term of five years, with parallel voting. 25 seats are elected by party-list proportional representation with a 5% electoral threshold, with the other half elected in 25 single-member constituencies by first-past-the-post voting. Seats in the proportional part are allocated using the Imperiali quota, modified to ensure that every party list, which passes the threshold, receives at least one mandate.

== Candidates ==
=== Party lists ===
To register regional lists of candidates, parties need to collect 0.5% of signatures of all registered voters in Tambov Oblast.

The following parties were relieved from the necessity to collect signatures:

- United Russia
- Communist Party of the Russian Federation
- Liberal Democratic Party of Russia
- A Just Russia
- New People
- Rodina

№	Party	Oblast-wide list	Candidates	Territorial groups	Status
1	New People	Aleksey Konstantinov • Aleksey Mikhaylov • Artyom Kochetkov	48	25	Registered
2	Liberal Democratic Party	Leonid Slutsky • Aleksandr Aseyev • Maksim Nechayev	65	25	Registered
3	A Just Russia	Pavel Plotnikov • Natalya Oginskaya	33	20	Registered
4	Rodina	Yelena Leonova • Lyubov Shanina • Vladimir Khorev	23	20	Registered
5	Communist Party	Andrey Zhidkov • Anton Veselovsky • Pavel Kolosnitsyn	42	25	Registered
6	United Russia	Ivan Boldyrev • Yelena Voronina • Sergey Khaustov	78	25	Registered
	Yabloko	Yana Zenkina	16	15	Did not file

New People took part in the Tambov Oblast legislative election for the first time after fielding a single candidate in 2021.

=== Single-mandate constituencies ===
25 single-mandate constituencies were formed in Tambov Oblast. To register candidates in single-mandate constituencies need to collect 3% of signatures of registered voters in the constituency.

Number of candidates in single-mandate constituencies
Party	Candidates	
Party	Nominated	Registered
United Russia	25	25
Communist Party	25	25
A Just Russia	24	23
Liberal Democratic Party	21	21
New People	17	15
Total	112	109

== Results ==
=== Results by party lists ===
Summary of the 18–20 September 2026 Tambov Oblast Duma election results
Party	Party list					Constituency		Total	
Party	Votes	%	±pp	Seats	+/–	Seats	+/–	Seats	+/–
United Russia	295,873	65.07	▲7.16	19	▲2	25	Steady	44	▲2
Communist Party	61,489	13.52	▼2.11	3	Steady	0	Steady	3	Steady
Liberal Democratic Party	31,347	6.89	▲1.62	1	Steady	0	Steady	1	Steady
New People	25,005	5.50	New	1	New	0	New	1	New
A Just Russia	24,694	5.43	▼1.16	1	Steady	0	Steady	1	Steady
Rodina	10,287	2.26	▼10.42	0	▼3	–	–	0	▼3
Invalid ballots	5,984	1.32	▼0.60	—	—	—	—	—	—
Total	454,679	100.00	—	25	Steady	25	Steady	50	Steady
Turnout	454,679	59.56	▲0.96	—	—	—	—	—	—
Registered voters	763,441	100.00	—	—	—	—	—	—	—

Head of Rasskazovsky District Aleksey Pozdnyakov (United Russia) was elected Chairman of the Oblast Duma, replacing outgoing Chairman Yevgeny Matushkin (United Russia). Lawyer and former Saint Petersburg Electoral Commission chairman Aleksey Puchnin (Independent) was appointed to the Federation Council, replacing incumbent Senator Aleksandr Nikitin (United Russia).

=== Results in single-member constituencies ===
==== District 1 ====
Summary of the 18–20 September 2026 Tambov Oblast Duma election in Morshansky constituency No.1
Candidate	Party	Votes	%
Irina Ten	United Russia	9,695	54.48%
Sergey Ostroukhov	Communist Party	3,404	19.13%
Svetlana Klimova	Liberal Democratic Party	2,233	12.55%
Dmitry Shirshov	A Just Russia	1,898	10.67%
Total		17,796	100%

==== District 2 ====
Summary of the 18–20 September 2026 Tambov Oblast Duma election in Bondarsky constituency No.2
Candidate	Party	Votes	%
Yury Pluzhnikov	United Russia	12,896	69.79%
Yelena Levashova	Communist Party	2,353	12.73%
Oleg Mordvintsev	A Just Russia	1,453	7.86%
Oleg Pershin	Liberal Democratic Party	1,419	7.68%
Total		18,478	100%

==== District 3 ====
Summary of the 18–20 September 2026 Tambov Oblast Duma election in Rasskazovsky constituency No.3
Candidate	Party	Votes	%
Lidia Gurova (incumbent)	United Russia	11,273	62.55%
Sergey Sviridov	Communist Party	2,591	14.38%
Denis Korablyov	Liberal Democratic Party	1,407	7.81%
Aleksey Kalinin	New People	1,278	7.09%
Andrey Dyukov	A Just Russia	1,165	6.46%
Total		18,022	100%

==== District 4 ====
Summary of the 18–20 September 2026 Tambov Oblast Duma election in Kirsanovsky constituency No.4
Candidate	Party	Votes	%
Sergey Pavlov	United Russia	10,902	64.32%
Anton Veselovsky	Communist Party	2,501	14.76%
Olga Ryabkova	Liberal Democratic Party	1,141	6.73%
Marina Baranova	A Just Russia	1,102	6.50%
Svetlana Gridneva	New People	1,056	6.23%
Total		16,949	100%

==== District 5 ====
Summary of the 18–20 September 2026 Tambov Oblast Duma election in Inzhavinsky constituency No.5
Candidate	Party	Votes	%
Aleksandr Popov (incumbent)	United Russia	13,331	66.94%
Nadezhda Komissarova	Communist Party	2,783	13.98%
Vladimir Pavlov	Liberal Democratic Party	1,366	6.86%
Diana Gagina	A Just Russia	1,135	5.70%
Dmitry Chaadayev	New People	1,064	5.34%
Total		19,914	100%

==== District 6 ====
Summary of the 18–20 September 2026 Tambov Oblast Duma election in Uvarovsky constituency No.6
Candidate	Party	Votes	%
Aleksey Kochetkov (incumbent)	United Russia	13,868	67.89%
Irina Sarnycheva	Communist Party	2,593	12.69%
Aleksandr Perov	Liberal Democratic Party	1,616	7.91%
Nikolay Anisimov	New People	1,108	5.42%
Marina Kosareva	A Just Russia	999	4.89%
Total		20,427	100%

==== District 7 ====
Summary of the 18–20 September 2026 Tambov Oblast Duma election in Zherdevsky constituency No.7
Candidate	Party	Votes	%
Yury Fedulov	United Russia	12,461	73.40%
Aleksey Lyovkin	Communist Party	1,886	11.11%
Viktor Yermakov	Liberal Democratic Party	1,109	6.53%
Svetlana Pozdnyakova	A Just Russia	653	3.85%
Anastasia Novikova	New People	649	3.82%
Total		16,977	100%

==== District 8 ====
Summary of the 18–20 September 2026 Tambov Oblast Duma election in Mordovsky constituency No.8
Candidate	Party	Votes	%
Sergey Fatyanov	United Russia	16,044	72.26%
Andrey Zhidkov	Communist Party	4,578	20.62%
Dmitry Kuznetsov	A Just Russia	1,414	6.37%
Total		22,202	100%

==== District 9 ====
Summary of the 18–20 September 2026 Tambov Oblast Duma election in Znamensky constituency No.9
Candidate	Party	Votes	%
Aleksey Pozdnyakov	United Russia	13,318	72.04%
Natalia Letunova	Communist Party	2,662	14.40%
Maksim Nechayev	Liberal Democratic Party	1,225	6.63%
Sergey Utochkin	A Just Russia	1,052	5.69%
Total		18,486	100%

==== District 10 ====
Summary of the 18–20 September 2026 Tambov Oblast Duma election in Morshansky constituency No.10
Candidate	Party	Votes	%
Pavel Moiseyev (incumbent)	United Russia	14,327	75.80%
Vladimir Shcherbakov	Communist Party	2,969	15.71%
Aleksandr Menshikh	A Just Russia	1,075	5.69%
Aleksandr Aseyev	Liberal Democratic Party	254	1.34%
Aleksey Moskovchenko	New People	221	1.17%
Total		18,900	100%

==== District 11 ====
Summary of the 18–20 September 2026 Tambov Oblast Duma election in Tambovsky constituency No.11
Candidate	Party	Votes	%
Irina Lavrushkina	United Russia	11,809	66.56%
Andrey Davydov	Communist Party	2,294	12.93%
Pavel Nikitin	Liberal Democratic Party	1,392	7.85%
Vladimir Zobnin	New People	1,191	6.71%
Sergey Solopov	A Just Russia	899	5.07%
Total		17,741	100%

==== District 12 ====
Summary of the 18–20 September 2026 Tambov Oblast Duma election in Michurinsky constituency No.12
Candidate	Party	Votes	%
Andrey Novichkov (incumbent)	United Russia	16,513	73.90%
Valery Korovodov	Communist Party	2,716	12.15%
Sergey Solopov	A Just Russia	1,664	7.45%
Arsen Minasyants	New People	1,159	5.19%
Total		22,346	100%

==== District 13 ====
Summary of the 18–20 September 2026 Tambov Oblast Duma election in Michurinsky constituency No.13
Candidate	Party	Votes	%
Konstantin Avgustyukov	United Russia	12,248	67.81%
Arseny Gavrilov	Communist Party	2,347	12.99%
Ilya Pichugin	New People	2,007	11.11%
Aleksey Lunev	Liberal Democratic Party	1,198	6.63%
Total		18,061	100%

==== District 14 ====
Summary of the 18–20 September 2026 Tambov Oblast Duma election in Michurinsky constituency No.14
Candidate	Party	Votes	%
Dmitry Bychkov	United Russia	12,355	68.59%
Aleksey Prigotsky	Communist Party	2,359	13.10%
Gennady Babaytsev	A Just Russia	1,801	10.00%
Anastasia Fyodorova	Liberal Democratic Party	1,213	6.73%
Total		18,012	100%

==== District 15 ====
Summary of the 18–20 September 2026 Tambov Oblast Duma election in Pervomaysky constituency No.15
Candidate	Party	Votes	%
Yekaterina Ivanova	United Russia	11,207	65.36%
Vadim Vyushkin	Communist Party	2,403	14.01%
Irina Filatova	A Just Russia	1,558	9.09%
Oleg Meshcheryakov	Liberal Democratic Party	1,542	8.99%
Total		17,147	100%

==== District 16 ====
Summary of the 18–20 September 2026 Tambov Oblast Duma election in Sosnovsky constituency No.16
Candidate	Party	Votes	%
Sergey Maksimov (incumbent)	United Russia	15,989	71.08%
Vladimir Yefimov	Communist Party	3,686	16.39%
Irina Yurasova	A Just Russia	2,543	11.30%
Total		22,495	100%

==== District 17 ====
Summary of the 18–20 September 2026 Tambov Oblast Duma election in Tambovsky constituency No.17
Candidate	Party	Votes	%
Mikhail Krasnyansky (incumbent)	United Russia	11,373	63.02%
Svetlana Belova	Communist Party	2,609	14.46%
Denis Trubachev	Liberal Democratic Party	1,277	7.08%
Ilya Chernyshov	New People	1,265	7.01%
Valery Lyashenko	A Just Russia	1,207	6.39%
Total		18,047	100%

==== District 18 ====
Summary of the 18–20 September 2026 Tambov Oblast Duma election in Tambovsky constituency No.18
Candidate	Party	Votes	%
Andrey Baldin	United Russia	9,436	59.41%
Sergey Meshcheryakov	Communist Party	2,278	14.34%
Vladislav Bazhenov	A Just Russia	1,349	8.49%
Marina Khvorova	Liberal Democratic Party	1,273	8.02%
Yelena Yuzhaninova	New People	1,228	7.73%
Total		15,882	100%

==== District 19 ====
Summary of the 18–20 September 2026 Tambov Oblast Duma election in Tambovsky constituency No.19
Candidate	Party	Votes	%
Nikolay Artemov	United Russia	10,177	60.03%
Vera Buyalskaya	Communist Party	2,579	15.21%
Marina Kolmakova	A Just Russia	1,993	11.76%
Danila Kobzev	New People	1,760	10.38%
Total		16,954	100%

==== District 20 ====
Summary of the 18–20 September 2026 Tambov Oblast Duma election in Tambovsky constituency No.20
Candidate	Party	Votes	%
Denis Illarionov (incumbent)	United Russia	8,767	56.23%
Pavel Kolosnitsyn	Communist Party	2,389	15.32%
Denis Dubovitsky	Liberal Democratic Party	1,631	10.46%
Sergey Kunavin	A Just Russia	1,306	8.38%
Ivan Fetisov	New People	1,240	7.95%
Total		15,590	100%

==== District 21 ====
Summary of the 18–20 September 2026 Tambov Oblast Duma election in Tambovsky constituency No.21
Candidate	Party	Votes	%
Roman Bazhilin	United Russia	8,411	58.95%
Vasily Nikiforov	Communist Party	2,642	18.52%
Aleksey Ranchin	New People	1,622	11.37%
Anton Mitroshkin	Liberal Democratic Party	1,302	9.13%
Total		14,268	100%

==== District 22 ====
Summary of the 18–20 September 2026 Tambov Oblast Duma election in Tambovsky constituency No.22
Candidate	Party	Votes	%
Roman Machikhin	United Russia	10,105	59.75%
Grigory Nazarov	Communist Party	2,970	17.56%
Andrey Klimov	A Just Russia	1,830	10.82%
Maksim Shutov	Liberal Democratic Party	1,724	10.19%
Total		16,913	100%

==== District 23 ====
Summary of the 18–20 September 2026 Tambov Oblast Duma election in Tambovsky constituency No.23
Candidate	Party	Votes	%
Aleksey Belov	United Russia	9,470	59.41%
Oleg Mikhaylenko	Communist Party	2,075	13.02%
Aleksandr Maksimov	Liberal Democratic Party	1,638	10.28%
Igor Yuryev	New People	1,320	8.28%
Tatyana Korelinova	A Just Russia	1,225	7.69%
Total		15,939	100%

==== District 24 ====
Summary of the 18–20 September 2026 Tambov Oblast Duma election in Tambovsky constituency No.24
Candidate	Party	Votes	%
Andrey Kleymenov	United Russia	8,606	56.36%
Ilya Zenin	Communist Party	2,850	18.67%
Vladimir Markov	A Just Russia	1,781	11.66%
Nikita Nasedkin	Liberal Democratic Party	1,446	9.47%
Total		15,269	100%

==== District 25 ====
Summary of the 18–20 September 2026 Tambov Oblast Duma election in Tambovsky constituency No.25
Candidate	Party	Votes	%
Valery Irzhanov	United Russia	11,600	63.24%
Oleg Popov	Communist Party	2,905	15.84%
Aleksey Merinov	A Just Russia	1,923	10.48%
Vadim Chebotov	Liberal Democratic Party	1,705	9.29%
Total		18,344	100%

=== Members ===
Incumbent deputies are highlighted with bold, elected members who declined to take a seat are marked with ~~strikethrough~~.

Constituency
No.	Member	Party
1	Irina Ten	United Russia
2	Yury Pluzhnikov	United Russia
3	Lidia Gurova	United Russia
4	Sergey Pavlov	United Russia
5	Aleksandr Popov	United Russia
6	Aleksey Kochetkov	United Russia
7	Yury Fedulov	United Russia
8	Sergey Fatyanov	United Russia
9	Aleksey Pozdnyakov	United Russia
10	Pavel Moiseyev	United Russia
11	Irina Lavrushkina	United Russia
12	Andrey Novichkov	United Russia
13	Konstantin Avgustyukov	United Russia
14	Dmitry Bychkov	United Russia
15	Yekaterina Ivanova	United Russia
16	Sergey Maksimov	United Russia
17	Mikhail Krasnyansky	United Russia
18	Andrey Baldin	United Russia
19	Nikolay Artemov	United Russia
20	Denis Illarionov	United Russia
21	Roman Bazhilin	United Russia
22	Roman Machikhin	United Russia
23	Aleksey Belov	United Russia
24	Andrey Kleymenov	United Russia
25	Valery Irzhanov	United Russia

Party lists
Member	Party
Ivan Boldyrev	United Russia
~~Yelena Voronina~~	United Russia
~~Sergey Khaustov~~	United Russia
Oleg Yamshchikov	United Russia
Aleksey Puchnin	United Russia
Konstantin Cherkasov	United Russia
Aleksey Kulikov	United Russia
Aleksandr Konovalov	United Russia
Nikolay Pavlov	United Russia
Galina Shemanayeva	United Russia
Viktor Dubrovin	United Russia
Dmitry Puzanov	United Russia
Valentin Mironov	United Russia
Aleksandr Kordabovsky	United Russia
Valery Solopov	United Russia
Yelena Semiletova	United Russia
Vyacheslav Dubrovin	United Russia
Vadim Pozdnyakov	United Russia
Vladimir Vinitsky	United Russia
~~Tamara Frolova~~	United Russia
~~Mikhail Karpov~~	United Russia
~~Sergey Nelyubov~~	United Russia
Aleksandr Romanov	United Russia
~~Yevgeny Lapochkin~~	United Russia
~~Svetlana Vlasova~~	United Russia
~~Vera Losikhina~~	United Russia
~~Aleksandr Voropayev~~	United Russia
~~Irina Ilyina~~	United Russia
~~Lidia Yezhak~~	United Russia
~~Zhanna Borisova~~	United Russia
~~Irina Yermakova~~	United Russia
~~Inna Postnikova~~	United Russia
Anzhelika Golovina	United Russia
Andrey Zhidkov	Communist Party
Anton Veselovsky	Communist Party
Pavel Kolosnitsyn	Communist Party
~~Leonid Slutsky~~	Liberal Democratic Party
~~Aleksandr Aseyev~~	Liberal Democratic Party
Maksim Nechayev	Liberal Democratic Party
Aleksey Konstantinov	New People
Pavel Plotnikov	A Just Russia

== See also ==
- 2026 Russian regional elections
