= 2026 Ingush legislative election =

Regional legislative election in Russia

- 18–20 September 2026

All 32 seats in the People's Assembly 17 seats needed for a majority
- Turnout: 87.63% ▲4.32 pp
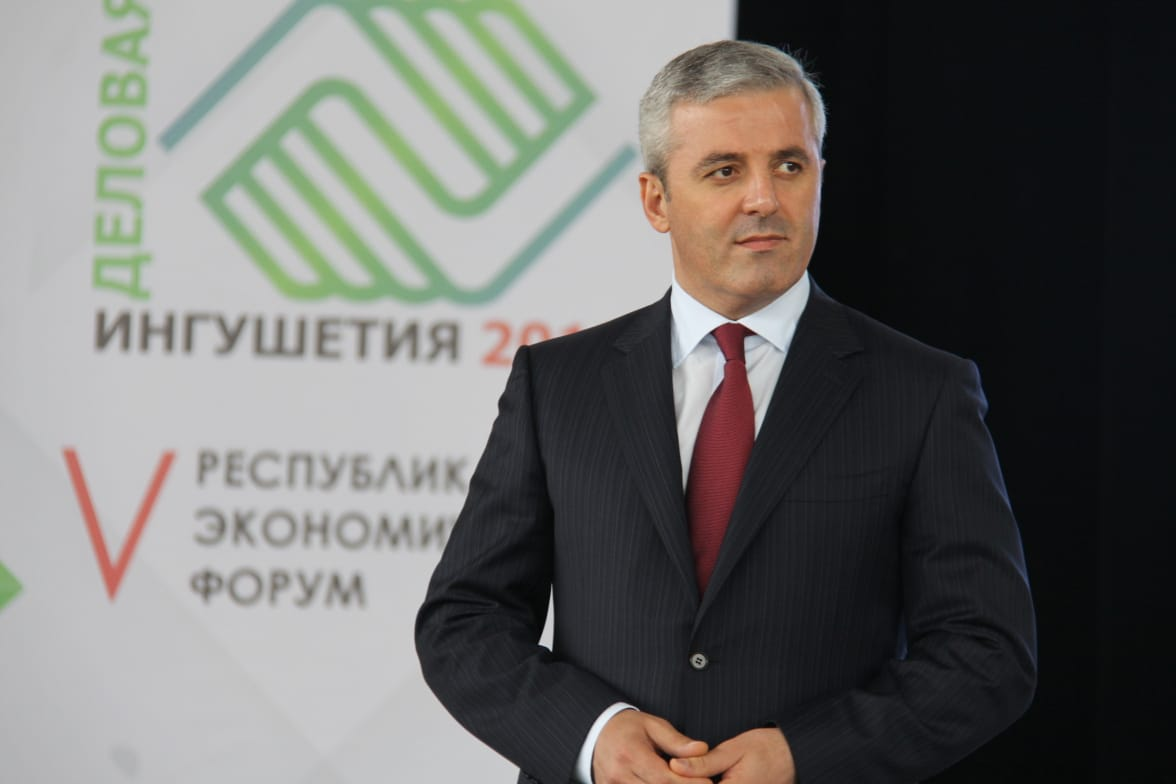

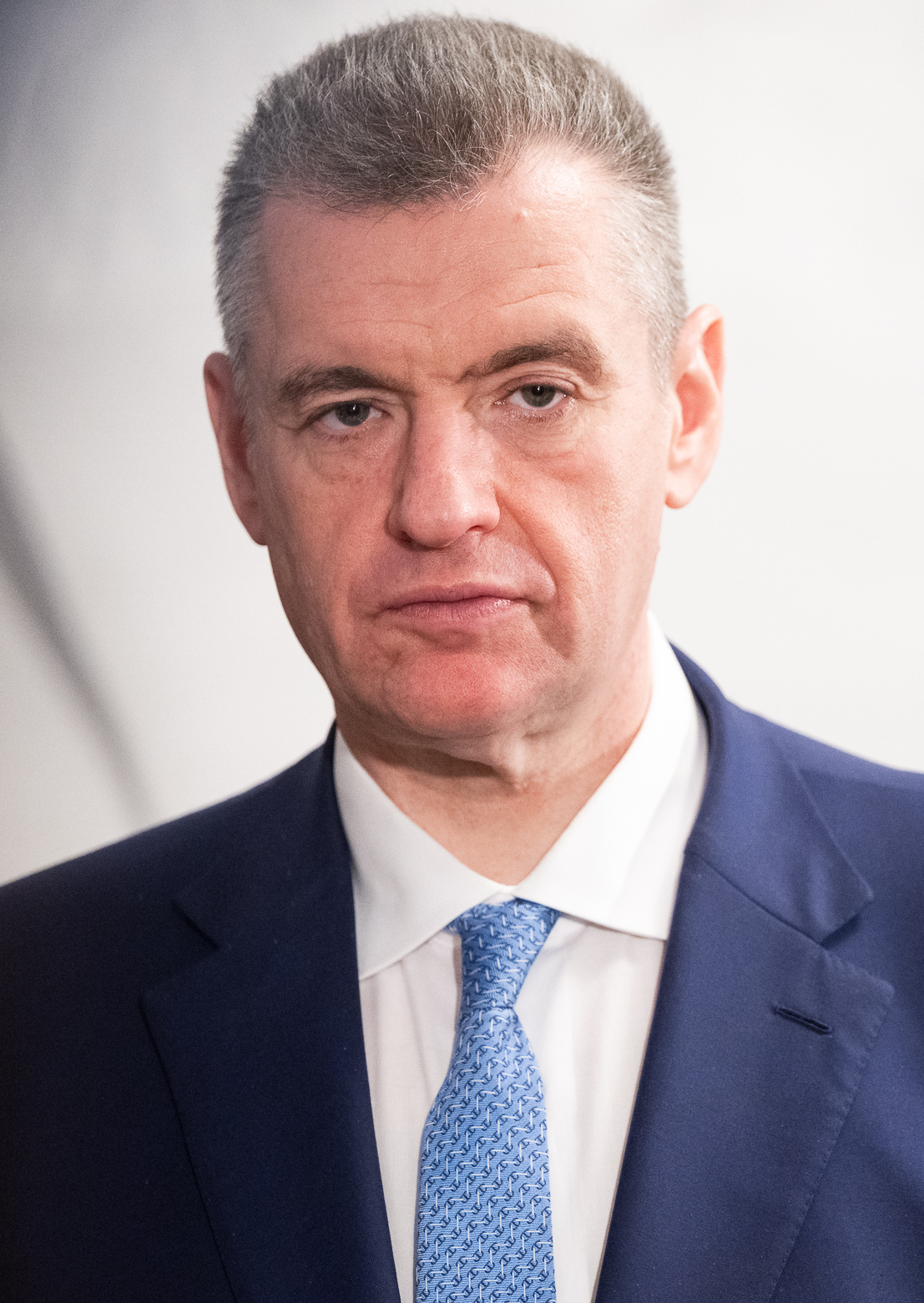
	Majority party	Minority party	Third party
		SR
Candidate	Ruslan Gagiyev	Ruslan Ozdoyev	Leonid Slutsky
Party	United Russia	A Just Russia	LDPR
Last election	82.10%, 27 seats	7.90%, 3 seats	5.05%, 2 seats
Seats won	27	2	2
Seat change	Steady	▼1	Steady
Popular vote	183,811	12,486	11,912
Percentage	80.84%	5.49%	5.24%
Swing	▼1.26 pp	▼2.41 pp	▲0.19 pp
	Fourth party	Fifth party
	NL	CPRF
Candidate	Umar Mutaliyev	Khamzat Kodzoyev
Party	New People	CPRF
Last election	Did not participate	4.16%, 0 seats
Seats won	1	0
Seat change	Did not participate	Steady
Popular vote	11,476	5,720
Percentage	5.05%	2.52%
Swing	Did not participate	▼1.64 pp
Chairman before election
Magomet Tumgoyev
United Russia
Elected Chairman
Ruslan Gagiyev
United Russia
Senator before election
Belan Khamchiev
United Russia
Senator after election
Belan Khamchiev
United Russia

The 2026 People's Assembly of the Republic of Ingushetia election took place on 18–20 September 2026, on common election day, coinciding with the 2026 Russian legislative election. All 32 seats in the People's Assembly were up for re-election.

United Russia retained its overwhelming majority in the People's Assembly, winning 80.8% of the vote. A Just Russia saw its vote share reduced and lost one of its three seats. New People entered the People's Assembly for the first time, narrowly crossing the 5% threshold and gaining one seat.

== Electoral system ==
Under current election laws, the People's Assembly is elected for a term of five years by party-list proportional representation with a 5% electoral threshold. Seats are allocated using the Hare quota. Ingushetia and Chechnya are the only regions in Russia that are presently using the Hare quota in regional legislative elections. Unlike most regional elections in Russia, party lists in Ingushetia are not divided between territorial groups.

== Candidates ==
=== Party lists ===
To register regional lists of candidates, parties need to collect 0.5% of signatures of all registered voters in Ingushetia.

The following parties were relieved from the necessity to collect signatures:

- United Russia
- Communist Party of the Russian Federation
- Liberal Democratic Party of Russia
- A Just Russia
- New People

№	Party	Party-list leaders	Candidates	Status
1	New People	Umar Mutaliev • Ibragim Yevloev • Rashid Aushev • Amir Tomov • Makka Klematova	36	Registered
2	A Just Russia	Ruzlan Ozdoev • Alikhan Arapkhanov • Muslim Dzeitov • Khadzhimurat Aliev • Adam Meiriev	35	Registered
3	Communist Party	Khamzat Kodzoev • Zalina Tsurova • Adam Tsapraliev • Akhmed Berikhanov • Zhamalel Yandiev	34	Registered
4	United Russia	Ruslan Gagiyev • Belan Khamchiev • Vakha Kastoev • Musa Markhiev • Adam Aliev	60	Registered
5	Liberal Democratic Party	Leonid Slutsky • Gelani Gadiev • Issay Khamatkhanov • Daud Uzhakhov • Umar Kostoev	35	Registered

New People took part in the Ingush legislative election for the first time.

== Results ==
Summary of the 18–20 September 2026 People's Assembly of the Republic of Ingushetia election results
Party	Votes	%	±pp	Seats	+/–
United Russia	183,811	80.84	▼1.26	27	Steady
A Just Russia	12,486	5.49	▼2.41	2	▼1
Liberal Democratic Party	11,912	5.24	▲0.19	2	Steady
New People	11,476	5.05	New	1	New
Communist Party	5,720	2.52	▼1.64	0	Steady
Invalid ballots	1,969	0.87	▲0.07	—	—
Total	227,374	100.00	—	32	Steady
Turnout	227,374	87.63	▲4.32	—	—
Registered voters	259,478	100.00	—	—	—

Former Premier of Ingushetia Ruslan Gagiyev (United Russia) was elected Chairman of the People's Assembly, replacing outgoing Chairman Magomet Tumgoyev (United Russia). Incumbent Senator Belan Khamchiev (United Russia) was re-appointed to the Federation Council.

=== Members ===
Incumbent deputies are highlighted with bold, elected members who declined to take a seat are marked with ~~strikethrough~~.

Party lists
Member	Party
Ruslan Gagiyev	United Russia
Belan Khamchiev	United Russia
Vakha Kastoyev	United Russia
Musa Markhiyev	United Russia
Adam Aliyev	United Russia
Magomet Aliskhanov	United Russia
Alaudin Bokov	United Russia
Beslan Gorchkhanov	United Russia
Ruslan Guliyev	United Russia
Magomed Dzeytov	United Russia
Magomet-Sali Dobriyev	United Russia
Magomed Mestoyev	United Russia
Rozat Dolgiyeva	United Russia
Zubeir Yevloyev	United Russia
Gilani Kalimatov	United Russia
Magomed Darsigov	United Russia
Suleim Mutaliyev	United Russia
Dzhabrail Mukhloyev	United Russia
Dzhambulat Ozdoyev	United Russia
Magomet Tumgoyev	United Russia
Batyr Khamkhoyev	United Russia
Aza Khashiyeva	United Russia
Akhmet Tsoroyev	United Russia
Mustafa Tsurov	United Russia
Yulia Chernysheva	United Russia
Badrudin Oligov	United Russia
Mukhazhir Yevloyev	United Russia
Ruslan Ozdoyev	A Just Russia
Alikhan Arapkhanov	A Just Russia
~~Leonid Slutsky~~	Liberal Democratic Party
Gelani Gadiyev	Liberal Democratic Party
Issay Khamatkhanov	Liberal Democratic Party
Umar Mutaliyev	New People

== See also ==
- 2026 Russian regional elections
