= 2026 Murmansk Oblast legislative election =

Regional legislative election in Russia

- 18–20 September 2026

All 28 seats in the Oblast Duma 15 seats needed for a majority
- Turnout: 49.90% ▲7.10 pp
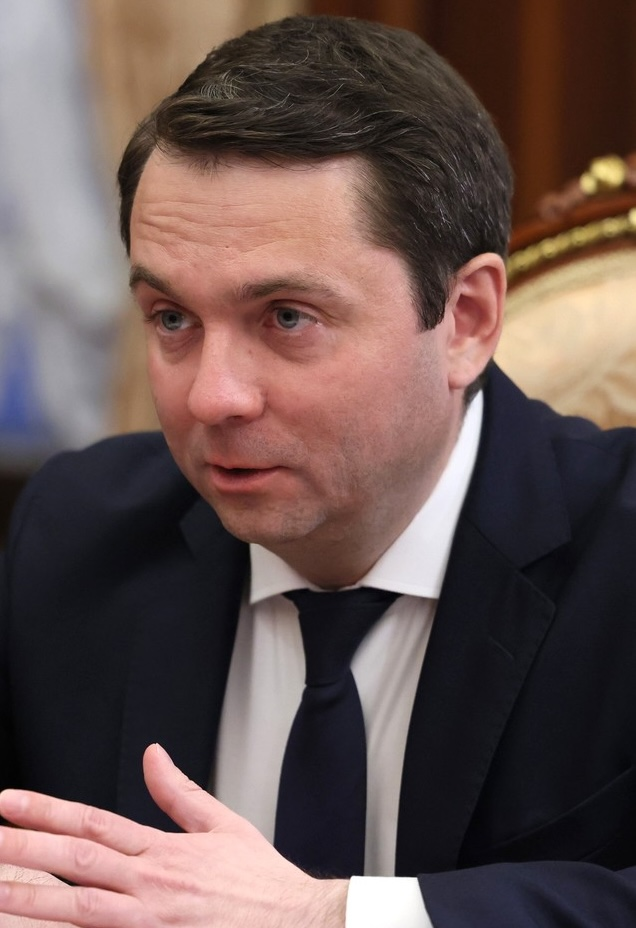

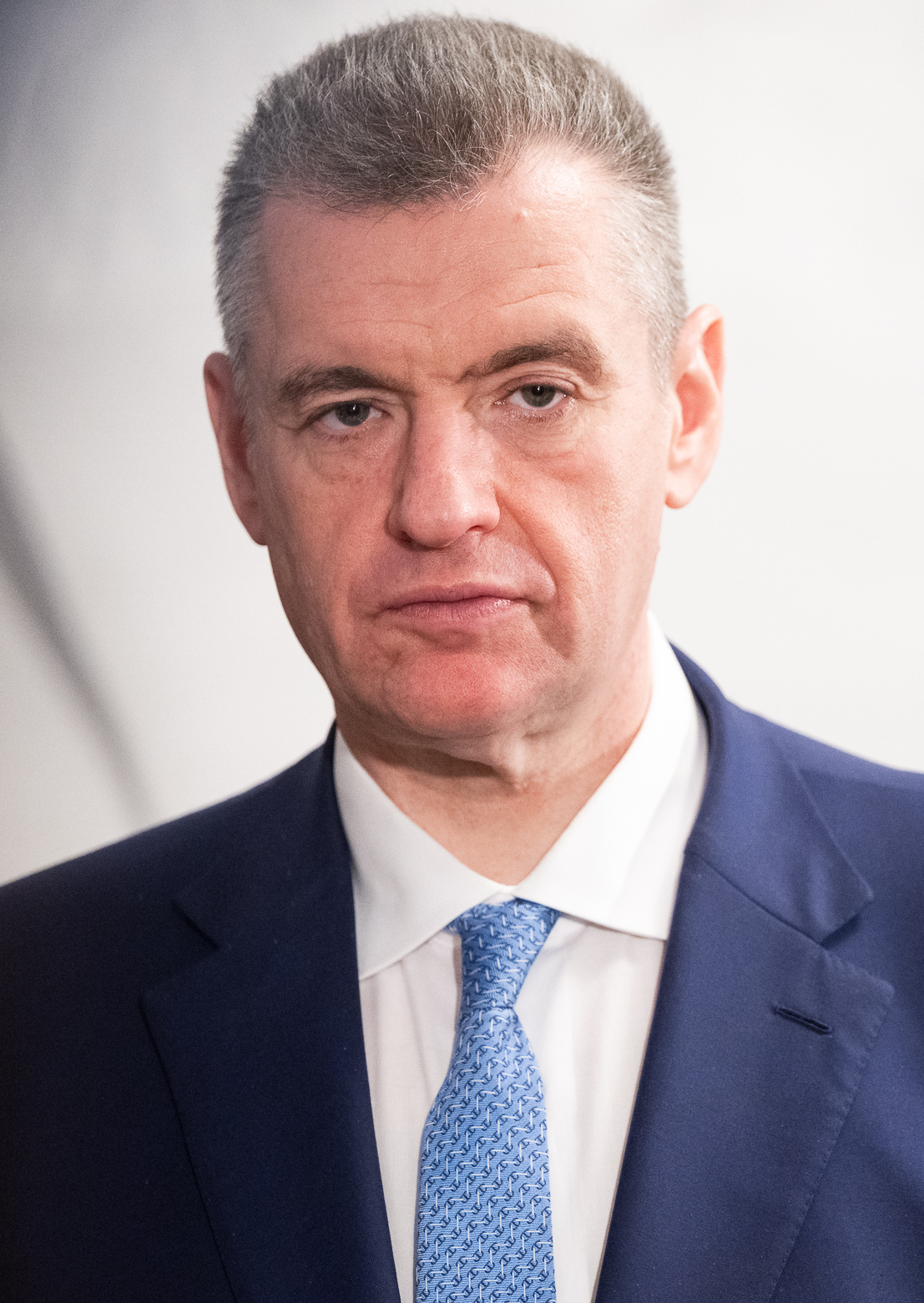
	Majority party	Minority party	Third party
		CPRF
Candidate	Andrey Chibis	Aleksandr Klementyev	Leonid Slutsky
Party	United Russia	CPRF	LDPR
Last election	36.02%, 25 seats	19.58%, 3 seats	13.34%, 1 seat
Seats won	22	1	1
Seat change	▼3	▼2	Steady
Popular vote	101,904	39,625	34,530
Percentage	39.88%	15.51%	13.51%
Swing	▲3.86 pp	▼4.07 pp	▼0.17 pp
	Fourth party	Fifth party	Sixth party
	NL	SR	RPPSS
Candidate	Sergey Bogma	Aleksandr Makarevich	Andrey Ivanov
Party	New People	A Just Russia	Party of Pensioners
Last election	Did not participate	16.99%, 2 seats	10.70%, 1 seat
Seats won	1	1	1
Seat change	New	▼1	▲1
Popular vote	33,586	21,988	17,041
Percentage	13.15%	8.61%	6.67%
Swing	New	▼8.38 pp	▼4.03 pp
Chairman before election
Sergey Dubovoy
United Russia
Elected Chairman
Sergey Dubovoy
United Russia
Senator before election
Larisa Kruglova
Independent (Note: elected as United Russia candidate)
Senator after election
Ivan Khrustalyov
Independent

The 2026 Murmansk Oblast Duma election took place on 18–20 September 2026, on common election day, coinciding with the 2026 Russian legislative election. All 28 seats in the Oblast Duma were up for re-election.

United Russia retained its overwhelming majority in the Oblast Duma, winning 39.9% of the vote and 17 single-mandate constituencies. Communist Party of the Russian Federation and A Just Russia saw significant drop in their vote share and lost two and one seat, respectively. Russian Party of Pensioners for Social Justice became the second-largest party in the Oblast Duma, winning one party-list seat and one single-mandate constituency. New People entered the Oblast Duma for the first time, winning 13.2% of the vote and one seat.

== Electoral system ==
Under current election laws, the Oblast Duma is elected for a term of five years, with parallel voting. 10 seats are elected by party-list proportional representation with a 5% electoral threshold, with the other part elected in 18 single-member constituencies by first-past-the-post voting (down from 22 seats in 2021). Seats in the proportional part are allocated using the Imperiali quota, modified to ensure that every party list, which passes the threshold, receives at least one mandate.

== Candidates ==
=== Party lists ===
To register regional lists of candidates, parties need to collect 0.5% of signatures of all registered voters in Murmansk Oblast.

The following parties were relieved from the necessity to collect signatures:

- United Russia
- Communist Party of the Russian Federation
- Liberal Democratic Party of Russia
- A Just Russia
- New People
- Russian Party of Pensioners for Social Justice

№	Party	Oblast-wide list	Candidates	Territorial groups	Status
1	Party of Pensioners	Andrey Ivanov • Almaz Gismeyev • Oleg Suchak • Aleksandr Zaborshchikov • Galina Podzolkova	52	18	Registered
2	New People	Sergey Bogma • Maksim Belov • Aleksey Ishchuk	54	18	Registered
3	Communist Party	Aleksandr Klementyev • Yury Vatalin • Gennady Stepakhno • Artyom Slepukhin • Yekaterina Osiyeva	41	14	Registered
4	United Russia	Andrey Chibis • Marina Starovoytova • Roman Fyodorov	93	18	Registered
5	Liberal Democratic Party	Leonid Slutsky • Stanislav Gontar	56	18	Registered
6	A Just Russia	Aleksandr Makarevich • Andrey Ivanov • Vasily Burov	43	16	Registered

New People took part in the Murmansk Oblast legislative election for the first time.

=== Single-mandate constituencies ===
18 single-mandate constituencies were formed in Murmansk Oblast. To register candidates in single-mandate constituencies need to collect 3% of signatures of registered voters in the constituency.

Number of candidates in single-mandate constituencies
Party	Candidates	
Party	Nominated	Registered
United Russia	18	18
Communist Party	16	15
A Just Russia	15	15
Liberal Democratic Party	18	17
Party of Pensioners	17	15
New People	18	17
Independent	1	0
Total	103	97

== Results ==
=== Results by party lists ===
Summary of the 18–20 September 2026 Murmansk Oblast Duma election results
Party	Party list					Constituency		Total	
Party	Votes	%	±pp	Seats	+/–	Seats	+/–	Seats	+/–
United Russia	101,904	39.88	▲3.86	5	Steady	17	▼3	22	▼3
Communist Party	39,625	15.51	▼4.07	1	▼1	0	▼1	1	▼2
Liberal Democratic Party	34,530	13.51	▼0.17	1	Steady	0	Steady	1	Steady
New People	33,586	13.15	New	1	New	0	New	1	New
A Just Russia	21,988	8.61	▼8.38	1	Steady	0	▼1	1	▼1
Party of Pensioners	17,041	6.67	▼4.03	1	Steady	1	▲1	2	▲1
Invalid ballots	6,822	2.67	▼0.70	—	—	—	—	—	—
Total	255,496	100.00	—	10	Steady	18	▼4	28	▼4
Turnout	255,496	49.90	▲7.10	—	—	—	—	—	—
Registered voters	511,977	100.00	—	—	—	—	—	—	—

Sergey Dubovoy (United Russia) was re-elected as Chairman of the Oblast Duma. Hero of Russia and Russian Army senior sergeant Ivan Khrustalyov (Independent) was appointed to the Federation Council, replacing incumbent Senator Larisa Kruglova (Independent).

=== Results in single-member constituencies ===
==== District 1 ====
Summary of the 18–20 September 2026 Murmansk Oblast Duma election in Pechengsky constituency No.1
Candidate	Party	Votes	%
Eduard Schmidt	United Russia	5,773	42.96%
Svetlana Krynina	New People	1,834	13.65%
Yegor Lapay	Liberal Democratic Party	1,803	13.42%
Sergey Shtannikov	Communist Party	1,439	10.71%
Svetlana Prikhodko	A Just Russia	1,209	9.00%
Tatyana Khoma	Party of Pensioners	809	6.02%
Total		13,437	100%

==== District 2 ====
Summary of the 18–20 September 2026 Murmansk Oblast Duma election in Kolsky constituency No.2
Candidate	Party	Votes	%
Larisa Kruglova	United Russia	5,298	42.02%
Aleksandr Pismak	A Just Russia	3,001	23.80%
Sergey Verkhovtsev	New People	2,103	16.68%
Mikhail Pesotsky	Party of Pensioners	1,709	13.56%
Total		12,607	100%

==== District 3 ====
Summary of the 18–20 September 2026 Murmansk Oblast Duma election in Aleksandrovsky constituency No.3
Candidate	Party	Votes	%
Sergey Dubovoy (incumbent)	United Russia	5,386	40.07%
Maksim Budko	New People	2,209	16.43%
Irina Sologub	Liberal Democratic Party	1,541	11.46%
Sergey Solovyov	Communist Party	1,536	11.43%
Olga Pukhnenkova	A Just Russia	1,277	9.50%
Lyudmila Volokhova	Party of Pensioners	1,020	7.59%
Total		13,442	100%

==== District 4 ====
Summary of the 18–20 September 2026 Murmansk Oblast Duma election in Murmansky constituency No.4
Candidate	Party	Votes	%
German Ivanov (incumbent)	United Russia	3,917	33.43%
Yury Vatalin	Communist Party	2,400	20.48%
Maksim Belov	New People	2,082	17.77%
Yana Bezdeleva	Liberal Democratic Party	1,144	9.76%
Andrey Ivanov	A Just Russia	1,143	9.75%
Elvira Akhadova	Party of Pensioners	599	5.11%
Total		11,718	100%

==== District 5 ====
Summary of the 18–20 September 2026 Murmansk Oblast Duma election in Murmansky constituency No.5
Candidate	Party	Votes	%
Mikhail Belosheyev (incumbent)	United Russia	4,369	34.92%
Vladimir Smirnov	Communist Party	2,010	16.07%
Nikolay Samarin	Liberal Democratic Party	1,748	13.97%
Yevgenia Lebedeva	A Just Russia	1,636	13.08%
Sergey Telenkov	New People	1,488	11.89%
Vyacheslav Solovyov	Party of Pensioners	900	7.19%
Total		12,511	100%

==== District 6 ====
Summary of the 18–20 September 2026 Murmansk Oblast Duma election in Murmansky constituency No.6
Candidate	Party	Votes	%
Roman Ponomarev (incumbent)	United Russia	4,705	35.46%
Natalya Lomakina	New People	2,037	15.35%
Nikolay Shchulepov	Communist Party	1,905	14.36%
Maksim Kukushkin	Liberal Democratic Party	1,848	13.93%
Igor Kotyash	A Just Russia	1,420	10.70%
Aleksey Grigorshchuk	Party of Pensioners	894	6.74%
Total		13,267	100%

==== District 7 ====
Summary of the 18–20 September 2026 Murmansk Oblast Duma election in Murmansky constituency No.7
Candidate	Party	Votes	%
Yevgeny Tarbayev (incumbent)	United Russia	4,448	36.50%
Vitaly Shirshov	Communist Party	1,746	14.33%
Aleksandr Polenkov	New People	1,730	14.20%
Yury Croitoru	A Just Russia	1,470	12.06%
Oleg Rudzinsky	Liberal Democratic Party	1,216	9.98%
Mikhail Karpov	Party of Pensioners	1,147	9.41%
Total		12,185	100%

==== District 8 ====
Summary of the 18–20 September 2026 Murmansk Oblast Duma election in Murmansky constituency No.8
Candidate	Party	Votes	%
Yekaterina Sulima	United Russia	4,092	34.29%
Aleksandr Makarevich	A Just Russia	2,081	17.44%
Gennady Stepakhno	Communist Party	1,809	15.16%
Aleksey Ishchuk	New People	1,426	11.95%
Inna Voronova	Liberal Democratic Party	1,396	11.70%
Pavel Grigorshchuk	Party of Pensioners	760	6.37%
Total		11,935	100%

==== District 9 ====
Summary of the 18–20 September 2026 Murmansk Oblast Duma election in Murmansky constituency No.9
Candidate	Party	Votes	%
Almaz Gismeyev (incumbent)	Party of Pensioners	2,781	25.21%
Yegor Banishevsky	United Russia	2,348	21.29%
Tatyana Andreyeva	A Just Russia	2,099	19.03%
Mikhail Antropov	Communist Party	1,910	17.32%
Valentina Chuprina	Liberal Democratic Party	1,495	13.55%
Total		11,030	100%

==== District 10 ====
Summary of the 18–20 September 2026 Murmansk Oblast Duma election in Murmansky constituency No.10
Candidate	Party	Votes	%
Viktor Saygin (incumbent)	United Russia	4,901	38.12%
Aleksandr Koryakin	Liberal Democratic Party	2,857	22.22%
Artyom Yermolenko	A Just Russia	2,349	18.27%
Igor Kozinsky	New People	2,142	16.66%
Total		12,856	100%

==== District 11 ====
Summary of the 18–20 September 2026 Murmansk Oblast Duma election in Severomorsky constituency No.11
Candidate	Party	Votes	%
Yevgeny Samorodin	United Russia	6,481	45.86%
Danil Lobyntsev	New People	2,643	18.70%
Veniamin Strekalovsky	Communist Party	2,013	14.25%
Roman Pavlikovsky	Liberal Democratic Party	1,724	12.20%
Aleksandr Myznikov	Party of Pensioners	909	6.43%
Total		14,131	100%

==== District 12 ====
Summary of the 18–20 September 2026 Murmansk Oblast Duma election in Severomorsky constituency No.12
Candidate	Party	Votes	%
Aleksandr Panasyuk	United Russia	4,626	38.22%
Yekaterina Osiyeva	Communist Party	2,328	19.23%
Mikhail Popov	New People	2,219	18.33%
Yelena Samuto	Liberal Democratic Party	1,614	13.33%
Mikhail Sorokoumov	Party of Pensioners	901	7.44%
Total		12,104	100%

==== District 13 ====
Summary of the 18–20 September 2026 Murmansk Oblast Duma election in Olenegorsky constituency No.13
Candidate	Party	Votes	%
Larisa Orlova (incumbent)	United Russia	7,947	47.88%
Artyom Slepukhin	Communist Party	2,689	16.20%
Aleksandr Pogodin	New People	1,912	11.52%
Nikita Chuprov	Liberal Democratic Party	1,891	11.39%
Yulia Chuprova	A Just Russia	1,626	9.80%
Total		16,597	100%

==== District 14 ====
Summary of the 18–20 September 2026 Murmansk Oblast Duma election in Kirovsky constituency No.14
Candidate	Party	Votes	%
Anton Trushenko	United Russia	8,086	47.90%
Anna Strelkova	Communist Party	2,639	15.63%
Artur Popov	Liberal Democratic Party	2,350	13.92%
Yelena Nikonova	Party of Pensioners	1,722	10.20%
Alexey Petukhov	New People	1,513	8.96%
Total		16,880	100%

==== District 15 ====
Summary of the 18–20 September 2026 Murmansk Oblast Duma election in Apatitsky constituency No.15
Candidate	Party	Votes	%
Aleksey Gilyarov (incumbent)	United Russia	4,813	30.30%
Niyazi Dzhakhangirov	Liberal Democratic Party	3,580	22.54%
Ilya Gerasimov	New People	2,508	15.79%
Viktor Zaytsev	Communist Party	2,245	14.13%
Sergey Potaman	A Just Russia	1,672	10.53%
Minislam Dzhabarov	Party of Pensioners	484	3.05%
Total		15,885	100%

==== District 16 ====
Summary of the 18–20 September 2026 Murmansk Oblast Duma election in Polyarozorinsky constituency No.16
Candidate	Party	Votes	%
Yevgeny Nikora	United Russia	4,489	33.32%
Olga Korneyenko	Communist Party	3,399	25.23%
Maksim Gostev	Liberal Democratic Party	2,101	15.60%
Aleksandra Pavlova	New People	1,875	13.92%
Aleksey Lychev	A Just Russia	1,068	7.93%
Total		13,472	100%

==== District 17 ====
Summary of the 18–20 September 2026 Murmansk Oblast Duma election in Kandalakshsky constituency No.17
Candidate	Party	Votes	%
Irina Prosolenko	United Russia	5,350	38.50%
Aleksandr Klementyev (incumbent)	Communist Party	2,992	21.53%
Aleksey Markiv	A Just Russia	1,647	11.85%
Sergey Akishin	New People	1,324	9.53%
Olga Kadyrova	Liberal Democratic Party	1,180	8.49%
Anatoly Klementyev	Party of Pensioners	868	6.25%
Total		13,897	100%

==== District 18 ====
Summary of the 18–20 September 2026 Murmansk Oblast Duma election in Monchegorsky constituency No.18
Candidate	Party	Votes	%
Maksim Ivanov (incumbent)	United Russia	5,842	43.03%
Dmitry Mokryshev	Liberal Democratic Party	2,276	16.76%
Mikhail Pogodin	New People	2,025	14.91%
Veronika Yaskunova	A Just Russia	1,965	14.47%
Liana Yaskunova	Party of Pensioners	851	6.27%
Total		13,577	100%

=== Members ===
Incumbent deputies are highlighted with bold, elected members who declined to take a seat are marked with ~~strikethrough~~.

Constituency
No.	Member	Party
1	Eduard Schmidt	United Russia
2	Larisa Kruglova	United Russia
3	Sergey Dubovoy	United Russia
4	German Ivanov	United Russia
5	Mikhail Belosheyev	United Russia
6	Roman Ponomarev	United Russia
7	Yevgeny Tarbayev	United Russia
8	Yekaterina Sulima	United Russia
9	Almaz Gismeyev	Party of Pensioners
10	Viktor Saygin	United Russia
11	Yevgeny Samorodin	United Russia
12	Aleksandr Panasyuk	United Russia
13	Larisa Orlova	United Russia
14	Anton Trushenko	United Russia
15	Aleksey Gilyarov	United Russia
16	Yevgeny Nikora	United Russia
17	Irina Prosolenko	United Russia
18	Maksim Ivanov	United Russia

Party lists
Member	Party
~~Andrey Chibis~~	United Russia
~~Marina Starovoytova~~	United Russia
~~Roman Fyodorov~~	United Russia
Sergey Utkin	United Russia
Igor Kurochkin	United Russia
~~Aleksandr Samarin~~	United Russia
~~Vladimir Yevmenkov~~	United Russia
Ivan Khrustalyov	United Russia
~~Sergey Somov~~	United Russia
~~Yegor Shubin~~	United Russia
~~Andrey Sadchikov~~	United Russia
~~Olga Zagidulina~~	United Russia
Anna Grishko	United Russia
Evelina Makarova	United Russia
Aleksandr Klementyev	Communist Party
~~Leonid Slutsky~~	Liberal Democratic Party
Stanislav Gontar	Liberal Democratic Party
Sergey Bogma	New People
Aleksandr Makarevich	A Just Russia
Andrey Ivanov	Party of Pensioners

== See also ==
- 2026 Russian regional elections
