= 2026 Russian elections =

Regional elections in Russia

- 20 September 2026
- 2026 Russian regional elections: Gubernatorial; Gubernatorial and legislative; Legislative; Legislative (of another subject); Two legislative elections (including one of another subject)

The 2026 Russian elections were held in Russia, in large part, on Sunday, 20 September 2026 (single election day), with several regions allowing voting on 18 and 19 September. 11 gubernatorial elections (eight direct and three indirectly elected), 39 regional parliamentary elections, and many elections on the municipal level took place.

The single election day was moved to the third Sunday of September (20 September), instead of the usual second Sunday (13 September), to combine regional and municipal elections with the State Duma election. Remote electronic voting (REV) was expected to be used in several regions, however, its expansion was allegedly curbed by ongoing internet restrictions with Presidential Administration senior official Aleksandr Kharichev claiming REV would be used only in regions where it had previously been implemented. In June 2026 Central Election Commission announced that 33 regions were approved to use REV in the 2026 elections, covering 48.4 million voters.

== Federal elections ==
=== Legislative election ===
All 450 members of the 9th State Duma were elected on 18–20 September 2026. State Duma is elected using parallel voting: 225 members are elected in single-mandate constituencies by plurality and the rest 225 – by party-list proportional representation with a 5% threshold. Party lists should have a federal part (country-wide list) with up to 15 candidates as well as at least 35 regional groups, comprising all subjects of the Russian Federation. Following the 2025 elections, 12 political parties (Note: United Russia, Communist Party of the Russian Federation, A Just Russia, Liberal Democratic Party of Russia, New People, Russian Party of Pensioners for Social Justice, Communists of Russia, Yabloko, Russian Ecological Party "The Greens", Rodina, Civic Platform and Party of Direct Democracy) are exempt from signature collection, while other political parties and independent candidates need to collect voters' signatures in order to get registered. In practice no other political party and just a handful of independent candidates are able to collect enough signatures due to high requirements (200,000 signatures for party lists, 3% of registered voters for independent candidates).

Party	Party-list			Constituency			Total seats	+/–
Party	Votes	%	Seats	Votes	%	Seats	Total seats	+/–
United Russia	39,118,497	59.01	140			209	349	+25
Communist Party	9,051,776	13.66	32			5	37	–20
Liberal Democratic Party	5,970,578	9.01	21			2	23	+2
New People	5,253,202	7.92	19			0	19	+6
A Just Russia	3,589,806	5.42	13			4	17	–10
Party of Pensioners	1,286,329	1.94	0			0	0	0
The Greens	761,542	1.15	0			0	0	0
Communists of Russia	555,943	0.84	0			0	0	0
Rodina	469,972	0.71	0			1	1	0
Party of Direct Democracy	231,011	0.35	0			0	0	New
Yabloko						0	0	0
Independents						4	4	–1
Total	66,288,656	100.00	225			225	450	0
Valid votes	66,288,656	98.64						
Invalid/blank votes	913,571	1.36						
Total votes	67,202,227	100.00						
Registered voters/turnout	112,789,817	59.58		112,789,817	–			
Source: Central Election Commission of the Russian Federation

== Regional elections ==
=== Gubernatorial direct elections ===
In 2026 eight direct gubernatorial elections were scheduled to be held in Russia. This number was expected to increase due to early retirements and rotations, while Central Electoral Commission chairwoman Ella Pamfilova hinted at this exact scenario in late December 2025. Direct gubernatorial elections in Russia are held using two-round system with the second round necessary in case no candidate achieves outright majority of votes, the most recent time second rounds were held in Russian gubernatorial elections occurred in 2018. First rounds of gubernatorial elections were held only on single election day, 20 September 2026, with all regions allowing voting on 18 and 19 September. All eight regions, where direct gubernatorial elections were currently scheduled to be held, allowed only registered political parties to nominate candidates with self-nomination being prohibited.

Region	Incumbent	Status	Last race	Result
Chechnya	Ramzan Kadyrov (ER)	Re-elected	2021: 99.73%	▌ ✓ Ramzan Kadyrov (inc.) (ER) 99.85%; ▌Ismail Denilkhanov (SR) 0.05%; ▌Khalid Nakayev (CPRF) 0.05%
Mordovia	Artyom Zdunov (ER)	Re-elected	2021: 78.26%	▌ ✓ Artyom Zdunov (inc.) (ER) 77.99%; ▌Aleksandr Aleksandrov (CPRF) 7.78%; ▌Yevgeny Tyurin (LDPR) 7.43%; ▌Timur Geraskin (SR) 3.85%; ▌Dmitry Masserov (Greens) 2.08%
Tuva	Vladislav Khovalyg (ER)	Re-elected	2021: 86.81%	▌ ✓ Vladislav Khovalyg (inc.) (ER) 90.95%; ▌Artysh Irgit (NL) 2.94%; ▌Lodoy-Damba Kuular (CPRF) 2.81%; ▌Yegor Chistyakov (LDPR) 1.87%; ▌Aziat Chanzan (SR) 1.18%
Belgorod Oblast	Vyacheslav Gladkov (ER)	Resigned	2021: 78.79%	▌ ✓ Alexander Shuvaev (inc.) (ER) 65.97%; ▌Yevgeny Dremov (LDPR) 10.66%; ▌Valery Shevlyakov (CPRF) 9.12%; ▌Artyom Zotov (RPPSS) 7.55%; ▌Vladimir Abelmazov (SR) 5.17%
Belgorod Oblast	Alexander Shuvaev (ER)	Acting Governor elected	–	▌ ✓ Alexander Shuvaev (inc.) (ER) 65.97%; ▌Yevgeny Dremov (LDPR) 10.66%; ▌Valery Shevlyakov (CPRF) 9.12%; ▌Artyom Zotov (RPPSS) 7.55%; ▌Vladimir Abelmazov (SR) 5.17%
Bryansk Oblast	Alexander Bogomaz (ER)	Resigned	2025: 78.78%	▌ ✓ Yegor Kovalchuk (inc.) (ER) 67.52%; ▌Andrey Arkhitsky (CPRF) 14.91%; ▌Ruslan Titov (LDPR) 8.05%; ▌Aleksey Timoshkov (SR) 4.70%; ▌Aleksandra Kazachkova (NL) 3.73%
Bryansk Oblast	Yegor Kovalchuk (ER)	Acting Governor elected	–	▌ ✓ Yegor Kovalchuk (inc.) (ER) 67.52%; ▌Andrey Arkhitsky (CPRF) 14.91%; ▌Ruslan Titov (LDPR) 8.05%; ▌Aleksey Timoshkov (SR) 4.70%; ▌Aleksandra Kazachkova (NL) 3.73%
Penza Oblast	Oleg Melnichenko (ER)	Re-elected	2021: 72.38%	▌ ✓ Oleg Melnichenko (inc.) (ER) 70.80%; ▌Oleg Shalyapin (CPRF) 13.09%; ▌Pavel Kulikov (LDPR) 6.76%; ▌Mikhail Lisin (SR) 5.22%; ▌Viktor Yeroshenko (RPPSS) 3.07%
Tver Oblast	Igor Rudenya (ER)	Resigned	2021: 52.33%	▌ ✓ Vitaly Korolyov (inc.) (ER) 69.48%; ▌Lyudmila Vorobyova (CPRF) 10.49%; ▌Olga Levina (LDPR) 6.44%; ▌Tatyana Petrova (SR) 5.64%; ▌Sergey Malinkovich (CPCR) 2.93%; ▌Igor Yakovenko (RPPSS) 1.94%
Tver Oblast	Vitaly Korolyov (ER)	Acting Governor elected	–	▌ ✓ Vitaly Korolyov (inc.) (ER) 69.48%; ▌Lyudmila Vorobyova (CPRF) 10.49%; ▌Olga Levina (LDPR) 6.44%; ▌Tatyana Petrova (SR) 5.64%; ▌Sergey Malinkovich (CPCR) 2.93%; ▌Igor Yakovenko (RPPSS) 1.94%
Ulyanovsk Oblast	Aleksey Russkikh (CPRF)	Re-elected	2021: 83.16%	▌ ✓ Aleksey Russkikh (inc.) (CPRF) 77.05%; ▌Sergey Marinin (LDPR) 8.72%; ▌Marina Kim (SR) 7.32%; ▌Yulia Yasaitis (NL) 5.23%

=== Gubernatorial indirect elections ===
In 2026 three indirect gubernatorial elections were scheduled to be held in Russia. In the indirect gubernatorial election regional chief executive (Head or Governor) is elected in the regional legislature by a simple majority. In all three regions holding indirect gubernatorial elections in 2026 each political party with factions in the regional legislature or the State Duma submits up to three candidacies to the President of Russia who then selects three candidates and presents them to the regional legislature. Indirect gubernatorial elections in Karachay-Cherkessia and North Ossetia were held only on single election day, 20 September 2026, while Head of Dagestan will be elected during the first session of the 8th People's Assembly of Dagestan.

Region	Incumbent	Status	Last race	Result
Dagestan	Sergey Melikov (ER)	Resigned	2021: 82/86	Fyodor Shchukin 78 / 87
Dagestan	Fyodor Shchukin (ER)	Acting Head elected	–	Fyodor Shchukin 78 / 87
Karachay-Cherkessia	Rashid Temrezov (ER)	Re-elected	2021: 48/48	Rashid Temrezov 48 / 48
North Ossetia	Sergey Menyaylo (ER)	Re-elected	2021: 57/68	Sergey Menyaylo 61 / 66

=== Legislative elections ===
In 2026 regional legislative elections were scheduled to be held in 39 regions, the most for an electoral cycle in Russia. 36 regional legislatures were elected by a parallel voting, while three (in Chechnya, Dagestan and Ingushetia) were elected by a party-list proportional representation with a 5% threshold. United Russia defended its majorities in every regional legislature it received following the 2021 elections, and won majority in the Altai Krai Legislative Assembly, where United Russian secured only plurality of seats during the previous cycle.

Most regions also saw their constituencies maps, adopted during 2015–16, expire prior to the 2026 elections so new maps were approved. This redistricting round already sparked conflicts in, for example, Saint Petersburg, Altai Krai and Kursk Oblast, where opposition parties (CPRF and Yabloko) accused United Russia of meddling into redistricting process and cracking competitive districts. Another conflict occurred in Lipetsk Oblast, where regional authorities and loyal deputies are attempting to decrease party-list representation from 14 to 9 members (and overall the composition of Lipetsk Oblast Council of Deputies from 42 to 36 members), which limits the ability of opposition parties to gain a decent representation.

Legislature	Seats	Voting system	Majority in last election		Majority after election	
Adygea	50	Parallel (25 party list + 25 SMC)	United Russia	40 / 50	United Russia	42 / 50
Chechnya	41	Party-list proportional representation	United Russia	37 / 41	United Russia	35 / 41
Chuvashia	44	Parallel (22 party list + 22 SMC)	United Russia	30 / 44	United Russia	34 / 44
Dagestan	90	Party-list proportional representation	United Russia	69 / 90	United Russia	69 / 90
Ingushetia	32	Party-list proportional representation	United Russia	27 / 32	United Russia	27 / 32
Karelia	36	Parallel (18 party list + 18 SMC)	United Russia	22 / 36	United Russia	21 / 36
Mordovia	48	Parallel (24 party list + 24 SMC)	United Russia	42 / 48	United Russia	44 / 48
Altai Krai	68	Parallel (34 party list + 34 SMC)	No majority (largest party: United Russia)	31 / 68	United Russia	51 / 68
Kamchatka Krai	28	Parallel (14 party list + 14 SMC)	United Russia	18 / 28	United Russia	24 / 28
Krasnoyarsk Krai	52	Parallel (26 party list + 22 SMC + 2 DMC)	United Russia	34 / 52	United Russia	39 / 52
Perm Krai	60	Parallel (30 party list + 30 SMC)	United Russia	40 / 60	United Russia	47 / 60
Primorsky Krai	40	Parallel (20 party list + 20 SMC)	United Russia	23 / 40	United Russia	32 / 40
Stavropol Krai	50	Parallel (25 party list + 25 SMC)	United Russia	43 / 50	United Russia	44 / 50
Amur Oblast	27	Parallel (9 party list + 18 SMC)	United Russia	18 / 27	United Russia	23 / 27
Astrakhan Oblast	44	Parallel (22 party list + 22 SMC)	United Russia	27 / 44	United Russia	33 / 44
Kaliningrad Oblast	40	Parallel (20 party list + 20 SMC)	United Russia	29 / 40	United Russia	32 / 40
Kirov Oblast	45▲ (from 40)	Parallel (15▲ party list + 30▲SMC)	United Russia	24 / 40	United Russia	31 / 45
Kursk Oblast	45	Parallel (21▼ party list + 24▲SMC)	United Russia	31 / 45	United Russia	37 / 45
Leningrad Oblast	50	Parallel (25 party list + 25 SMC)	United Russia	35 / 50	United Russia	44 / 50
Lipetsk Oblast	36▼ (from 42)	Parallel (9▼ party list + 27▼SMC)	United Russia	23 / 42	United Russia	28 / 36
Moscow Oblast	50	Parallel (25 party list + 25 SMC)	United Russia	36 / 50	United Russia	39 / 50
Murmansk Oblast	28▼ (from 32)	Parallel (10 party list + 18▼SMC)	United Russia	25 / 32	United Russia	22 / 28
Nizhny Novgorod Oblast	50	Parallel (25 party list + 25 SMC)	United Russia	40 / 50	United Russia	41 / 50
Novgorod Oblast	32	Parallel (12 party list + 20 SMC)	United Russia	23 / 32	United Russia	26 / 32
Omsk Oblast	44	Parallel (22 party list + 22 SMC)	United Russia	26 / 44	United Russia	35 / 44
Orenburg Oblast	47	Parallel (24 party list + 23 SMC)	United Russia	29 / 47	United Russia	41 / 47
Oryol Oblast	50	Parallel (25 party list + 25 SMC)	United Russia	27 / 50	United Russia	28 / 50
Pskov Oblast	26	Parallel (13 party list + 13 SMC)	United Russia	19 / 26	United Russia	21 / 26
Samara Oblast	50	Parallel (25 party list + 25 SMC)	United Russia	36 / 50	United Russia	42 / 50
Sverdlovsk Oblast	50	Parallel (25 party list + 25 SMC)	United Russia	33 / 50	United Russia	36 / 50
Tambov Oblast	50	Parallel (25 party list + 25 SMC)	United Russia	42 / 50	United Russia	44 / 50
Tomsk Oblast	42	Parallel (21 party list + 21 SMC)	United Russia	27 / 42	United Russia	28 / 42
Tver Oblast	40	Parallel (20 party list + 20 SMC)	United Russia	29 / 40	United Russia	31 / 40
Tyumen Oblast	48	Parallel (24 party list + 24 SMC)	United Russia	38 / 48	United Russia	40 / 48
Vologda Oblast	34	Parallel (17 party list + 17 SMC)	United Russia	24 / 34	United Russia	18 / 34
Saint Petersburg	50	Parallel (25 party list + 25 SMC)	United Russia	29 / 50	United Russia	37 / 50
Jewish Autonomous Oblast	19	Parallel (10 party list + 9 SMC)	United Russia	14 / 19	United Russia	14 / 19
Chukotka Autonomous Okrug	15	Parallel (9 party list + 2 TMC)	United Russia	11 / 15	United Russia	12 / 15
Khanty-Mansi Autonomous Okrug	40▲ (from 38)	Parallel (20▲ party list + 20▲SMC)	United Russia	29 / 38	United Russia	31 / 40

=== Legislative by-elections ===
Territories that are internationally recognised as part of Ukraine are highlighted with beige.

Constituency		Incumbent		This Race	
Legislature	No.	Former member	Party	Results	Candidates
Legislative Assembly of Vladimir Oblast	15	Mikhail Maksyukov	United Russia	Incumbent died August 7, 2025, in a car crash New member elected March 22, 2026; United Russia hold	▌ ✓ Ivan Yakhayev (ER) 52.43%; ▌Samir Ragimov (CPRF) 24.25%; ▌Artyom Moguchy (LDPR) 8.34%; ▌Yegor Solovyov (NL) 7.05%; ▌Aleksandr Shelekhov (RPPSS) 4.21%
Tula Oblast Duma	17	Ilya Kurilov	United Russia	Incumbent resigned July 27, 2025; New member elected September 20, 2026; United Russia hold	▌ ✓ Andrey Mazov (ER) 51.69%; ▌Artyom Seliverstov (LDPR) 16.52%; ▌Andrey Drabik (SR) 15.90%; ▌Nina Orlova (RPPSS) 13.43%
Legislative Assembly of Kemerovo Oblast	5	Natalya Lazovskaya	United Russia	Incumbent resigned August 1, 2025; New member elected September 20, 2026; United Russia hold	▌ ✓ Maya Krivoruchko (ER) 65.29%; ▌Artyom Nikolayev (LDPR) 14.30%; ▌Mikhail Boborykin (CPRF) 12.20%; ▌Natalya Serikova (SR) 7.06%
Arkhangelsk Oblast Assembly of Deputies	19	Irina Frolova	United Russia	Incumbent resigned September 24, 2025; New member elected September 20, 2026; United Russia hold	▌ ✓ Nikita Sergeyev (ER) 30.32%; ▌Olga Lebedeva (LDPR) 25.16%; ▌Artyom Kolmogortsev (CPRF) 19.80%; ▌Lyubov Vikulova (SR) 13.71%; ▌Olga Firsova (RPPSS) 7.13%
Legislative Assembly of Rostov Oblast	30	Lidia Novoseltseva	United Russia	Incumbent resigned September 26, 2025, after being elected to the Rostov-on-Don City Duma; New member elected September 20, 2026; United Russia hold	▌ ✓ Avtandil Ochkhikidze (ER) 47.76%; ▌Natalya Oskina (CPRF) 35.99%; ▌Lyubov Rumyantseva (LDPR) 6.11%; ▌Artyom Paramonov (NL) 4.10%; ▌Oleg Denisov (SR) 3.36%; ▌Viktoria Osadchaya (CPCR) 2.14%
Bryansk Oblast Duma	28	Yury Nikiforov	United Russia	Incumbent resigned November 10, 2025, to become acting Deputy Governor of Bryansk Oblast; New member elected September 20, 2026; United Russia hold	▌ ✓ Nikolay Tamilin (ER) 72.93%; ▌Eduard Kovalev (CPRF) 15.06%; ▌Sergey Senin (LDPR) 3.97%; ▌Dmitry Kharitonov (SR) 3.94%; ▌Dmitry Moiseyenko (NL) 3.40%
Legislative Assembly of Irkutsk Oblast	18	Natalya Dikusarova	United Russia	Incumbent resigned November 12, 2025, to become Deputy Chairwoman of the Government of Irkutsk Oblast; New member elected September 20, 2026; United Russia hold	▌ ✓ Vyacheslav Belsky (ER) 48.07%; ▌Igor Zuyev (SR) 16.42%; ▌Anton Lebedev (LDPR) 15.70%; ▌Vasily Kupreyev (NL) 13.42%
Great Khural of the Republic of Tuva	10	Sayan Ondar	Independent	Incumbent expelled November 19, 2025, after being indicted for intentional infliction of harm New member elected September 20, 2026; United Russia gain	▌ ✓ Temir Saryglar (ER) 86.20%; ▌Dorzhsambuu Ondar (CPRF) 13.60%
Legislative Assembly of Vladimir Oblast	24	Roman Kavinov	United Russia	Incumbent resigned December 3, 2025, to become Mayor of Suzdal; New member elected September 20, 2026; United Russia hold	▌ ✓ Sergey Mameyev (ER) 64.48%; ▌Anton Mineyev (LDPR) 32.33%
State Council of the Republic of Tatarstan	50	Azat Ziganshin	United Russia	Incumbent resigned January 12, 2026, to become Minister of Ecology and Natural Resources of Tatarstan; New member elected September 20, 2026; Independent gain	▌ ✓ Farid Abdulganiyev (IND) 64.90%; ▌Musa Kasyukov (CPRF) 22.64%; ▌Rushan Khasanov (LDPR) 11.36%
Volgograd Oblast Duma	18	Stanislav Korotkov	United Russia	Incumbent resigned February 12, 2026, due to anticorruption investigation New member elected September 20, 2026; United Russia hold	▌ ✓ Alexey Volotskov (ER) 50.10%; ▌Vyacheslav Shapovalov (CPRF) 22.67%; ▌Aleksey Kononenko (LDPR) 15.41%; ▌Vitaly Kravtsov (SR) 10.83%
Tula Oblast Duma	10	Dmitry Afonichev	United Russia	Incumbent resigned February 26, 2026; New member elected September 20, 2026; United Russia hold	▌ ✓ Aleksandr Solntsev (ER) 56.95%; ▌Dmitry Shishkin (SR) 16.48%; ▌Igor Kozlov (LDPR) 13.64%; ▌Olga Krupiy (RPPSS) 10.02%
Tula Oblast Duma	11	Gennady Nikitin	United Russia	Incumbent resigned February 26, 2026; New member elected September 20, 2026; United Russia hold	▌ ✓ Vladimir Oleynikov (ER) 39.90%; ▌Valery Pakhomov (SR) 20.66%; ▌Aleksandr Marinkov (LDPR) 19.83%; ▌Natalya Ostropovich (RPPSS) 17.07%
State Assembly of the Sakha Republic	15	Vladimir Poskachin	Independent	Incumbent expelled March 25, 2026, after being indicted for illegal possession of ammunition New member elected September 20, 2026; United Russia gain	▌ ✓ Nikolay Dolgunov (ER) 49.17%; ▌Vladimir Skrybykin (NL) 24.84%; ▌Anatoly Liu-Fa (SR) 12.75%; ▌Dmitry Petrov (CPRF) 11.72%
State Council of the Republic of Crimea	22	Aleksey Tikhomirov	United Russia	Incumbent resigned May 15, 2026; New member elected September 20, 2026; United Russia hold	▌ ✓ Anzhelika Karkach (ER) 53.35%; ▌Fyodor Shpakovsky (CPRF) 16.33%; ▌Aleksey Sobolev (SR) 11.61%; ▌Vitaly Podobashev (LDPR) 7.96%; ▌Valery Dutselovich (CPCR) 6.85%
Arkhangelsk Oblast Assembly of Deputies	8	Mikhail Avaliani	United Russia	Incumbent resigned May 19, 2026; New member elected September 20, 2026; United Russia hold	▌ ✓ Sergey Pivkov (ER) 31.86%; ▌Mikhail Shishov (CPRF) 24.62%; ▌Mikhail Blokhin (LDPR) 16.62%; ▌Natalya Grebneva (SR) 8.83%; ▌Aleksandr Kazakov (NL) 8.66%; ▌Albert Shishov (RPPSS) 6.86%
State Assembly of the Republic of Bashkortostan	28	Gulnur Kulsarina	United Russia	Incumbent resigned May 21, 2026; New member elected September 20, 2026; United Russia hold	▌ ✓ Andrey Nazarov (ER) 81.87%; ▌Aleksandr Zubko (SR) 6.70%; ▌Azat Mamatov (LDPR) 5.67%; ▌Rustam Salikhov (IND) 3.42%; ▌Mikhail Korovin (IND) 1.51%
Kurgan Oblast Duma	1	Vladimir Semyonov	United Russia	Incumbent resigned May 26, 2026, to move to another region New member elected September 20, 2026; United Russia hold	▌ ✓ Yelena Vasilyeva (ER) 34.15%; ▌Artur Pushchin (CPRF) 16.44%; ▌Irina Nalimova (NL) 15.85%; ▌Anton Rudakov (LDPR) 15.66%; ▌Maksim Pivovarov (SR) 14.40%
Legislative Assembly of Ulyanovsk Oblast	2	Shamil Shaidullin	United Russia	Incumbent resigned June 11, 2026; New member elected September 20, 2026; United Russia hold	▌ ✓ Vladimir Paramonov (ER) 54.06%; ▌Aleksandr Koshlin (CPRF) 19.35%; ▌Sergey Gutnikov (SR) 8.61%; ▌Pyotr Sholmov (LDPR) 8.31%; ▌Yulia Sinyagina (NL) 5.98%

== Municipal elections ==
Numerous local elections were held in Russia throughout 2026, both to the municipal councils and executive authorities. The adoption of the new federal law on local self-government also abolished all direct mayoral elections in administrative centres of Russian regions which affected Yakutsk, initially scheduled to hold its election in 2026. Several regions made changes to their structure of local self-government (municipal reform) discontinuing direct mayoral and district elections, most notably in Yakutia.

=== District elections ===
District	Incumbent	Date	Status	Last race	Results
Ust-Abakansky District (Khakassia)	Yelena Yegorova (ER)	Sep 20, 2026	Lost re-election	37.45%	▌ ✓ Nina Leonchenko (CPRF) 42.28%; ▌Yelena Yegorova (inc.) (ER) 40.93%; ▌Nina Leontenko (CPCR) 6.02%; ▌Nikolay Vasilyev (LDPR) 5.18%; ▌Ivan Kukartsev (PVR) 3.22%
Zavitinsky District (Amur Oblast)	Sergey Linevich (ER)	Sep 20, 2026	Re-elected	75.90%	▌ ✓ Sergey Linevich (inc.) (ER) 71.68%; ▌Dmitry Tatarchuk (IND) 22.35%

=== Municipal Council elections ===
Municipal body	Seats	Voting system	Majority in last election		Majority after election	
Council of Ufa (Bashkortostan)	36	Parallel (18 party list + 18 SMC)	United Russia	26 / 36	United Russia	28 / 36
Grozny City Duma (Chechnya)	27	Party-list proportional representation	United Russia	25 / 27	United Russia	24 / 27
Council of Local Self-Government of Nalchik (Kabardino-Balkaria)	33	Party-list proportional representation	United Russia	23 / 33	United Russia	21 / 33
Petrozavodsk City Council (Karelia)	28	Parallel (14 party list + 14 SMC)	United Russia	17 / 28	United Russia	18 / 28
Council of Deputies of Saransk (Mordovia)	28	Parallel (14 party list + 14 SMC)	United Russia	21 / 28	United Russia	21 / 28
Perm City Duma (Perm Krai)	36	Parallel (14 party list + 22 SMC)	United Russia	25 / 36	United Russia	27 / 36
City Council of Kaliningrad (Kaliningrad Oblast)	27	First-past-the-post	United Russia	21 / 27	United Russia	29 / 30
Kemerovo City Council of People's Deputies (Kemerovo Oblast)	36	Parallel (18 party list + 18 SMC)	United Russia	32 / 36	United Russia	31 / 36
Saratov City Duma (Saratov Oblast)	35	First-past-the-post	United Russia	30 / 35	United Russia	29 / 37
Duma of Khanty-Mansiysk (Khanty-Mansi Autonomous Okrug)	25	Parallel (13 party list + 12 SMC)	United Russia	20 / 25	United Russia	23 / 25
Council of Federal Territory Sirius (Krasnodar Krai)	17	9 three-member constituencies + 7 appointed (Note: 3 are appointed by the President of Russia, 3 – by the Government of Russia, 1 – by the Governor of Krasnodar Krai) + 1 ex officio (Head of Administration)	Independent	10 / 17	Independent	17 / 17
