= 2026 Primorsky Krai legislative election =

Regional legislative election in Russia

- 18–20 September 2026

All 40 seats in the Legislative Assembly 21 seats needed for a majority
- Turnout: 63.68% ▲21.81 pp
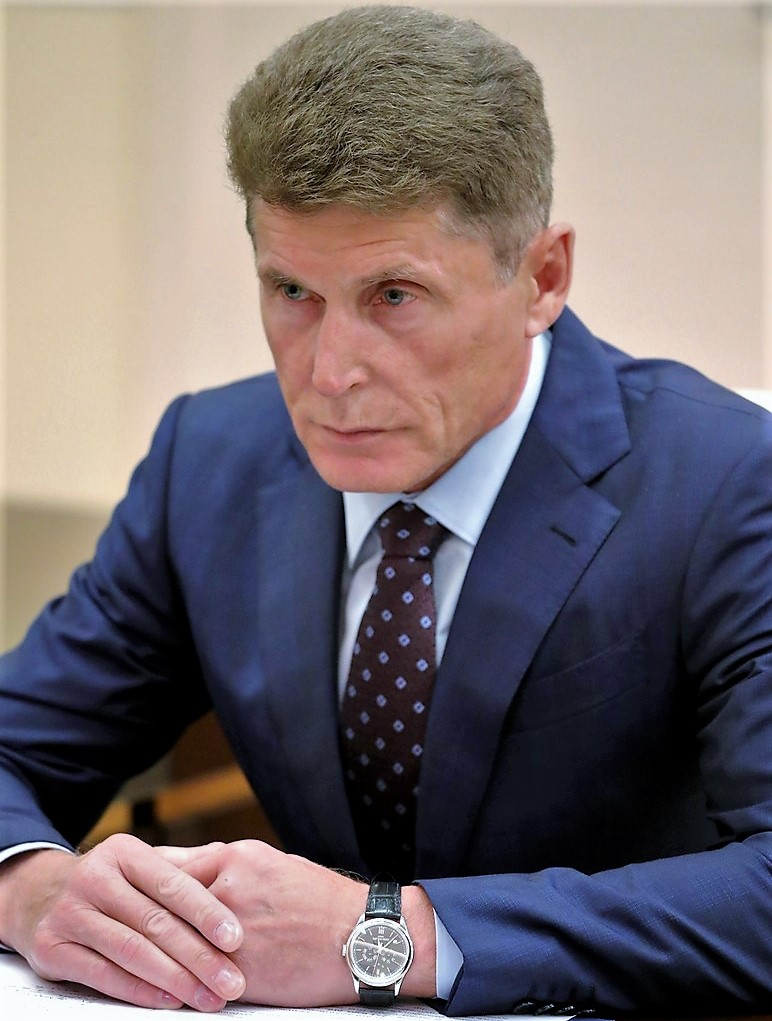

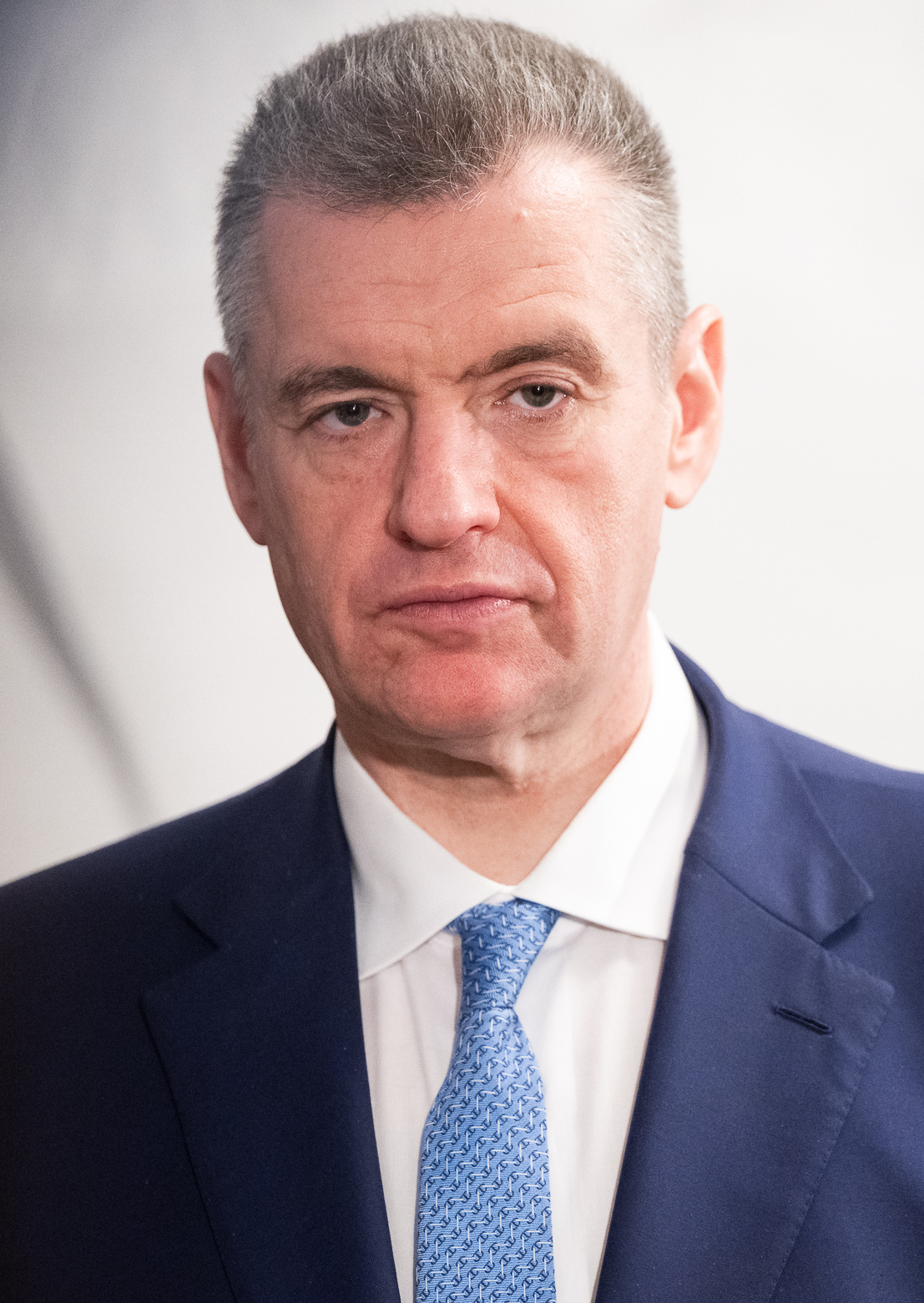
	Majority party	Minority party	Third party
			CPRF
Candidate	Oleg Kozhemyako	Leonid Slutsky	Anatoly Dolgachev
Party	United Russia	LDPR	CPRF
Last election	37.88%, 23 seats	9.03%, 1 seat	31.02%, 14 seats
Seats won	32	1	5
Seat change	▲9	Steady	▼9
Popular vote	551,222	102,528	81,076
Percentage	61.96%	11.52%	9.11%
Swing	▲24.08 pp	▲2.49 pp	▼21.91 pp
	Fourth party	Fifth party	Sixth party
	NL	SR	RPPSS
Candidate	Dmitry Komarov	Aleksey Kozitsky	Vyacheslav Baydelyuk
Party	New People	A Just Russia	Party of Pensioners
Last election	Failed to qualify	9.29%, 1 seat	8.40%, 1 seat
Seats won	1	1	0
Seat change	Failed to qualify	Steady	▼1
Popular vote	72,865	47,728	21,323
Percentage	8.19%	5.36%	2.40%
Swing	Failed to qualify	▼3.93 pp	▼6.00 pp
Chairman before election
Anton Voloshko
United Russia
Elected Chairman
Anton Voloshko
United Russia
Senator before election
Lyudmila Talabayeva
United Russia
Senator after election
Zhanna Gudkova
United Russia

The 2026 Legislative Assembly of Primorsky Krai election took place on 18–20 September 2026, on common election day, coinciding with the 2026 Russian legislative election. All 40 seats in the Legislative Assembly were up for re-election.

United Russia increased its vote share by 24 points and secured an overwhelming majority in the Legislative Assembly, winning 6 party-list seats and 26 single-mandate constituencies. Communist Party of the Russian Federation lost more than two thirds of its previous vote and fell to third place, behind Liberal Democratic Party of Russia, but still received the second-largest faction by winning four constituencies. New People entered the Legislative Assembly for the first time, while Russian Party of Pensioners failed to cross the threshold and lots its sole member.

== Electoral system ==
Under current election laws, the Legislative Assembly is elected for a term of five years, with parallel voting. 10 seats are elected by party-list proportional representation with a 5% electoral threshold, with the other part elected in 30 single-member constituencies by first-past-the-post voting. Seats in the proportional part are allocated using the Imperiali quota, modified to ensure that every party list, which passes the threshold, receives at least one mandate.

== Candidates ==
=== Party lists ===
To register regional lists of candidates, parties need to collect 0.5% of signatures of all registered voters in Primorsky Krai.

The following parties were relieved from the necessity to collect signatures:

- United Russia
- Communist Party of the Russian Federation
- Liberal Democratic Party of Russia
- A Just Russia
- New People
- Russian Party of Pensioners for Social Justice

№	Party	Krai-wide list	Candidates	Territorial groups	Status
1	United Russia	Oleg Kozhemyako • Artur Potapov • Vera Shcherbina	29	10	Registered
2	A Just Russia	Aleksey Kozitsky • Nina Chepakhina • Olesya Belikova	23	10	Registered
3	Party of Pensioners	Vyacheslav Baydelyuk • Ivan Trutnev • Yevgeny Pankov	20	11	Registered
4	Liberal Democratic Party	Leonid Slutsky • Andrey Andreychenko • Daniil Litvinenko	28	10	Registered
5	New People	Dmitry Komarov • Alyona Nitsora	22	10	Registered
6	Communist Party	Anatoly Dolgachev • Sergey Dikusar • Elsevar Gabibov	27	10	Registered
	Rodina	Mikhail Drozdov • Andrey Fedotov	22	10	Did not file

=== Single-mandate constituencies ===
30 single-mandate constituencies were formed in Primorsky Krai. To register candidates in single-mandate constituencies need to collect 3% of signatures of registered voters in the constituency.

Number of candidates in single-mandate constituencies
Party	Candidates	
Party	Nominated	Registered
United Russia	30	30
Communist Party	29	29
A Just Russia	30	30
Liberal Democratic Party	33	30
Party of Pensioners	29	29
New People	30	29
Independent	1	0
Total	182	177

== Results ==
=== Results by party lists ===
Summary of the 18–20 September 2026 Legislative Assembly of Primorsky Krai election results
Party	Party list					Constituency		Total	
Party	Votes	%	±pp	Seats	+/–	Seats	+/–	Seats	+/–
United Russia	551,222	61.96	▲24.08	6	▲2	26	▲7	32	▲9
Liberal Democratic Party	102,528	11.52	▲2.49	1	Steady	0	Steady	1	Steady
Communist Party	81,076	9.11	▼21.91	1	▼2	4	▼7	5	▼9
New People	72,865	8.19	New	1	New	0	New	1	New
A Just Russia	47,728	5.36	▼3.93	1	Steady	0	Steady	1	Steady
Party of Pensioners	21,323	2.40	▼6.00	0	▼1	0	Steady	0	▼1
Invalid ballots	12,902	1.45	▼2.94	—	—	—	—	—	—
Total	889,644	100.00	—	10	Steady	30	Steady	40	Steady
Turnout	889,644	63.68	▲21.81	—	—	—	—	—	—
Registered voters	1,397,100	100.00	—	—	—	—	—	—	—

Anton Voloshko (United Russia) was re-elected as Chairman of the Legislative Assembly, while Zhanna Gudkova (United Russia), widow of Russian Navy deputy commander Mikhail Gudkov, was appointed to the Federation Council, replacing incumbent Senator Lyudmila Talabayeva (United Russia).

=== Results in single-member constituencies ===
==== District 1 ====
Summary of the 18–20 September 2026 Legislative Assembly of Primorsky Krai election in District 1
Candidate	Party	Votes	%
Yevgeny Lyashenko (incumbent)	Communist Party	11,413	38.45%
Konstantin Lozovoy	United Russia	8,262	27.84%
Aleksey Vikdorov	Liberal Democratic Party	4,009	13.51%
Yekaterina Khudinina	New People	3,043	10.25%
Igor Yekimov	A Just Russia	1,925	6.49%
Tatyana Kosheleva	Party of Pensioners	749	2.52%
Total		29,679	100%

==== District 2 ====
Summary of the 18–20 September 2026 Legislative Assembly of Primorsky Krai election in District 2
Candidate	Party	Votes	%
Sergey Aramilev	United Russia	18,342	61.25%
Aleksandr Sakharov	New People	3,098	10.34%
Natalya Shutenko	Communist Party	2,790	9.32%
Mikhail Chigatov	Liberal Democratic Party	2,726	9.10%
Yelena Terekhova	A Just Russia	1,927	6.43%
Aleksey Sergiyenko	Party of Pensioners	518	1.73%
Total		29,947	100%

==== District 3 ====
Summary of the 18–20 September 2026 Legislative Assembly of Primorsky Krai election in District 3
Candidate	Party	Votes	%
Dmitry Novikov	United Russia	19,081	59.58%
Aleksandr Zakharov	Liberal Democratic Party	4,116	12.85%
Lolita Tazhakhmedova	New People	3,488	10.89%
Aleksandr Puz	A Just Russia	2,485	7.76%
Radda Fyodorova	Party of Pensioners	2,427	7.58%
Total		32,028	100%

==== District 4 ====
Summary of the 18–20 September 2026 Legislative Assembly of Primorsky Krai election in District 4
Candidate	Party	Votes	%
Veronika Sipachyova	United Russia	18,242	58.61%
Svyatoslav Zatynaychenko	Liberal Democratic Party	3,855	12.38%
Anton Nesterov	New People	2,872	9.23%
Sergey Mikhaylov	Communist Party	2,666	8.56%
Aleksandra Smolyaninova	A Just Russia	2,299	7.39%
Yulia Mirkamilova	Party of Pensioners	851	2.73%
Total		31,127	100%

==== District 5 ====
Summary of the 18–20 September 2026 Legislative Assembly of Primorsky Krai election in District 5
Candidate	Party	Votes	%
Alyona Shtybina	United Russia	18,298	57.41%
Vasily Vasilyev	Liberal Democratic Party	4,416	13.85%
Anastasia Azizova	New People	3,306	10.37%
Dmitry Kozachuk	Communist Party	2,697	8.46%
Irina Feshchenkova	A Just Russia	1,721	5.40%
Svetlana Tsyganok	Party of Pensioners	828	2.60%
Total		31,875	100%

==== District 6 ====
Summary of the 18–20 September 2026 Legislative Assembly of Primorsky Krai election in District 6
Candidate	Party	Votes	%
Nadezhda Telelyuyeva (incumbent)	Communist Party	11,133	36.51%
Yulia Stratiyenko	United Russia	9,950	32.63%
Yelena Vikdorova	Liberal Democratic Party	3,038	9.96%
Yulia Kravchenko	New People	2,686	8.81%
Nina Chepakhina	A Just Russia	2,188	7.18%
Anzhelika Grishchenko	Party of Pensioners	1,108	3.63%
Total		30,494	100%

==== District 7 ====
Summary of the 18–20 September 2026 Legislative Assembly of Primorsky Krai election in District 7
Candidate	Party	Votes	%
Artyom Volodin	United Russia	14,998	60.90%
Yulia Milchakova	Communist Party	3,138	12.74%
Gadzhi Zaipullayev	Liberal Democratic Party	2,058	8.36%
Aleksey Bayanov	Party of Pensioners	1,751	7.11%
Maksim Sveshnikov	A Just Russia	1,598	6.49%
Total		24,626	100%

==== District 8 ====
Summary of the 18–20 September 2026 Legislative Assembly of Primorsky Krai election in District 8
Candidate	Party	Votes	%
Maria Lagunova	United Russia	17,854	60.04%
Inna Kosheleva	Liberal Democratic Party	3,336	11.22%
Vladimir Kutishchev	Communist Party	2,905	9.77%
Kristina Ionashko	New People	2,537	8.53%
Artur Rogozhnikov	A Just Russia	1,581	5.32%
Elvira Geraskina	Party of Pensioners	1,172	3.94%
Total		29,736	100%

==== District 9 ====
Summary of the 18–20 September 2026 Legislative Assembly of Primorsky Krai election in District 9
Candidate	Party	Votes	%
Artur Potapov	United Russia	21,061	66.58%
Denis Yuvan	Communist Party	3,744	11.84%
Arseny Karayev	A Just Russia	2,331	7.37%
Adel Faizulina	Liberal Democratic Party	1,878	5.94%
Yulia Usova	New People	1,522	4.81%
Yulia Chaplygina	Party of Pensioners	940	2.97%
Total		31,632	100%

==== District 10 ====
Summary of the 18–20 September 2026 Legislative Assembly of Primorsky Krai election in District 10
Candidate	Party	Votes	%
Konstantin Sidenko (incumbent)	United Russia	22,694	64.78%
Aleksey Mikhaylenko	Liberal Democratic Party	4,047	11.55%
Maria Tsirlina	New People	3,367	9.61%
Galina Kubasova	Communist Party	2,343	6.69%
Igor Borodachev	A Just Russia	1,267	3.62%
Yekaterina Kokshina	Party of Pensioners	1,201	3.43%
Total		35,031	100%

==== District 11 ====
Summary of the 18–20 September 2026 Legislative Assembly of Primorsky Krai election in District 11
Candidate	Party	Votes	%
Igor Schaufler (incumbent)	United Russia	21,106	63.39%
Oleg Grachyov	A Just Russia	4,076	12.24%
Viktor Navros	Communist Party	3,361	10.09%
Valery Matusevich	Party of Pensioners	2,237	6.72%
Rostislav Samoylenko	Liberal Democratic Party	1,496	4.49%
Anna Shamova	New People	786	2.36%
Total		33,295	100%

==== District 12 ====
Summary of the 18–20 September 2026 Legislative Assembly of Primorsky Krai election in District 12
Candidate	Party	Votes	%
Andrey Akimov (incumbent)	Communist Party	11,644	39.34%
Yelena Poletayeva	United Russia	10,253	34.64%
Darya Tkalich	New People	2,596	8.77%
Aleksey Golovlev	Liberal Democratic Party	2,535	8.57%
Darya Vepreva	A Just Russia	1,095	3.70%
Aleksandr Baban	Party of Pensioners	970	3.28%
Total		29,597	100%

==== District 13 ====
Summary of the 18–20 September 2026 Legislative Assembly of Primorsky Krai election in District 13
Candidate	Party	Votes	%
Dmitry Kim	United Russia	17,761	64.30%
Mikhail Semagayev	Communist Party	3,425	12.40%
Andrey Nikolenko	Liberal Democratic Party	2,650	9.59%
Anton Chaban	New People	1,337	4.84%
Svetlana Burlakova	A Just Russia	1,174	4.25%
Vyacheslav Nikolayev	Party of Pensioners	876	3.17%
Total		27,622	100%

==== District 14 ====
Summary of the 18–20 September 2026 Legislative Assembly of Primorsky Krai election in District 14
Candidate	Party	Votes	%
Roman Sankler	United Russia	16,294	55.30%
Tatyana Snopkova	Communist Party	3,830	13.00%
Anna Saratova	Liberal Democratic Party	3,356	11.39%
Olesya Kolyucheva	New People	2,732	9.27%
Valentina Volodkova	Party of Pensioners	1,347	4.57%
Ksenia Fyodorova	A Just Russia	1,294	4.39%
Total		29,467	100%

==== District 15 ====
Summary of the 18–20 September 2026 Legislative Assembly of Primorsky Krai election in District 15
Candidate	Party	Votes	%
Aleksandr Kirilyuk (incumbent)	United Russia	21,125	64.86%
Zakhar Kosmach	Communist Party	3,058	9.39%
Denis Matsak	Liberal Democratic Party	2,837	8.71%
Sergey Molchanov	New People	2,191	6.73%
Valery Shilin	Party of Pensioners	1,724	5.29%
Andrey Yerofeyev	A Just Russia	1,454	4.46%
Total		32,572	100%

==== District 16 ====
Summary of the 18–20 September 2026 Legislative Assembly of Primorsky Krai election in District 16
Candidate	Party	Votes	%
Dzhoni Avdoi (incumbent)	United Russia	17,379	57.86%
Arina Tereshina	Liberal Democratic Party	4,644	15.46%
Nikita Molozhavy	Party of Pensioners	2,794	9.30%
Ilya Karimov	New People	1,828	6.09%
Sergey Gursky	Communist Party	1,774	5.91%
Denis Baulo	A Just Russia	1,215	4.05%
Total		30,035	100%

==== District 17 ====
Summary of the 18–20 September 2026 Legislative Assembly of Primorsky Krai election in District 17
Candidate	Party	Votes	%
Sergey Kuzmenko (incumbent)	United Russia	20,613	65.70%
Aleksey Bondar	Liberal Democratic Party	2,725	8.69%
Irina Bereza	Communist Party	2,617	8.34%
Lilia Susekova	New People	2,340	7.46%
Andrey Serdyukov	A Just Russia	1,395	4.45%
Sergey Ochkovsky	Party of Pensioners	1,057	3.37%
Total		31,375	100%

==== District 18 ====
Summary of the 18–20 September 2026 Legislative Assembly of Primorsky Krai election in District 18
Candidate	Party	Votes	%
Eduard Tsoi (incumbent)	United Russia	14,438	60.25%
Tatyana Ivanova	Communist Party	2,608	10.88%
Tatyana Gavrilova	Party of Pensioners	2,055	8.58%
Anton Galushkin	Liberal Democratic Party	1,965	8.20%
Natalya Neznayko	New People	1,164	4.86%
Olga Usachyova	A Just Russia	1,038	4.33%
Total		23,965	100%

==== District 19 ====
Summary of the 18–20 September 2026 Legislative Assembly of Primorsky Krai election in District 19
Candidate	Party	Votes	%
Tatyana Trudneva	United Russia	15,706	55.48%
Vyavheslav Gnezdilov	Liberal Democratic Party	3,839	13.56%
Ivan Matveyev	New People	3,287	11.61%
Natalya Kim	Communist Party	2,742	9.69%
Natalya Zalesova	A Just Russia	1,589	5.61%
Irina Kazarova	Party of Pensioners	1,048	3.70%
Total		28,308	100%

==== District 20 ====
Summary of the 18–20 September 2026 Legislative Assembly of Primorsky Krai election in District 20
Candidate	Party	Votes	%
Yulia Park	United Russia	15,183	58.59%
Boris Samoylenko	Liberal Democratic Party	3,567	13.76%
Pyotr Oleynik	Communist Party	2,352	9.08%
Pyotr Makovetsky	Party of Pensioners	1,675	6.46%
Aleksandr Strekalev	New People	1,503	5.80%
Viktor Tselin	A Just Russia	1,375	5.31%
Total		25,916	100%

==== District 21 ====
Summary of the 18–20 September 2026 Legislative Assembly of Primorsky Krai election in District 21
Candidate	Party	Votes	%
Anton Voloshko (incumbent)	United Russia	16,804	65.11%
Lyudmila Pronina	Communist Party	2,611	10.12%
Nikita Moskvichyov	Liberal Democratic Party	2,538	9.83%
Karina Fedorko	New People	1,491	5.78%
Olga Rypolova	Party of Pensioners	972	3.77%
Yulia Yankova	A Just Russia	910	3.53%
Total		25,810	100%

==== District 22 ====
Summary of the 18–20 September 2026 Legislative Assembly of Primorsky Krai election in District 22
Candidate	Party	Votes	%
Pavel Serebryakov	United Russia	12,940	55.68%
Svetlana Zavadskaya	Communist Party	2,844	12.24%
Maksim Sitnikov	Liberal Democratic Party	1,890	8.13%
Marina Katalevskaya	Party of Pensioners	1,672	7.19%
Irina Seraya	New People	1,638	7.05%
Natalya Antonova	A Just Russia	1,428	6.14%
Total		23,242	100%

==== District 23 ====
Summary of the 18–20 September 2026 Legislative Assembly of Primorsky Krai election in District 23
Candidate	Party	Votes	%
Ilya Tkachev	United Russia	12,905	56.24%
Denis Yakub	Communist Party	2,336	10.18%
Maksim Lukichyov	Liberal Democratic Party	2,058	8.97%
Yevgeny Budkov	New People	1,682	7.33%
Sergey Tsiryulnik	Party of Pensioners	1,549	6.75%
Anatoly Shcherbatyuk	A Just Russia	1,125	4.90%
Total		22,945	100%

==== District 24 ====
Summary of the 18–20 September 2026 Legislative Assembly of Primorsky Krai election in District 24
Candidate	Party	Votes	%
Maksim Melnikov	United Russia	15,663	58.88%
Philipp Matsyga	Liberal Democratic Party	3,143	11.82%
Roman Sitnikov	New People	2,322	8.73%
Aleksandr Seredin	Communist Party	2,099	7.89%
Nikolay Gumen	A Just Russia	1,521	5.72%
Nikolay Milyutin	Party of Pensioners	1,013	3.81%
Total		26,601	100%

==== District 25 ====
Summary of the 18–20 September 2026 Legislative Assembly of Primorsky Krai election in District 25
Candidate	Party	Votes	%
Vsevolod Romanov (incumbent)	United Russia	19,336	63.70%
Yevgeny Konobeyev	Liberal Democratic Party	3,572	11.77%
Yelena Strizhenko	Communist Party	2,476	8.16%
Svetlana Somova	New People	2,348	7.73%
Anton Seleznev	A Just Russia	1,480	4.88%
Natalya Shekurova	Party of Pensioners	723	2.38%
Total		30,356	100%

==== District 26 ====
Summary of the 18–20 September 2026 Legislative Assembly of Primorsky Krai election in District 26
Candidate	Party	Votes	%
Vil Gladunov	United Russia	18,387	62.95%
Aleksey Shmakov	Liberal Democratic Party	3,609	12.36%
Vitaly Shunyayev	New People	2,345	8.03%
Yevgeny Zhuravlev	Communist Party	2,344	8.02%
Antonina Zaytseva	A Just Russia	1,803	6.17%
Ksenia Gordeyeva	Party of Pensioners	600	2.05%
Total		29,210	100%

==== District 27 ====
Summary of the 18–20 September 2026 Legislative Assembly of Primorsky Krai election in District 27
Candidate	Party	Votes	%
Nikolay Alyoshin (incumbent)	United Russia	20,815	65.62%
Aleksandr Movchan	Liberal Democratic Party	3,271	10.31%
Ivan Konyakhin	New People	2,576	8.12%
Vladimir Sapozhnikov	Communist Party	2,230	7.03%
Andrey Ligay	A Just Russia	1,897	5.98%
Yelena Kuznetsova	Party of Pensioners	811	2.56%
Total		31,722	100%

==== District 28 ====
Summary of the 18–20 September 2026 Legislative Assembly of Primorsky Krai election in District 28
Candidate	Party	Votes	%
Yevgeny Gubal	United Russia	16,440	60.26%
Yevgeny Lembet	Liberal Democratic Party	4,029	14.77%
Dmitry Popov	New People	2,683	9.84%
Aleksandr Tolkachev	Communist Party	2,543	9.32%
Igor Shulpin	Party of Pensioners	1,088	3.99%
Total		27,280	100%

==== District 29 ====
Summary of the 18–20 September 2026 Legislative Assembly of Primorsky Krai election in District 29
Candidate	Party	Votes	%
Aleksandr Sorokin (incumbent)	Communist Party	9,858	37.10%
Yekaterina Semyonova	United Russia	8,570	32.25%
Yevgeny Chigrinsky	Liberal Democratic Party	3,062	11.52%
Yevgenia Barannikova	New People	2,885	10.86%
Margarita Polesskaya	A Just Russia	1,556	5.86%
Total		26,573	100%

==== District 30 ====
Summary of the 18–20 September 2026 Legislative Assembly of Primorsky Krai election in District 30
Candidate	Party	Votes	%
Yevgeny Kalyachkin	United Russia	15,297	56.90%
Tatyana Larkova	Liberal Democratic Party	2,957	11.00%
Irina Kovalenko	Communist Party	2,670	9.93%
Sergey Supronenko	New People	2,644	9.84%
Yevgeny Baykov	A Just Russia	1,369	5.09%
Vladimir Omelchenko	Party of Pensioners	1,063	3.95%
Total		26,882	100%

=== Members ===
Incumbent deputies are highlighted with bold, elected members who declined to take a seat are marked with ~~strikethrough~~.

Constituency
No.	Member	Party
1	Yevgeny Lyashenko	Communist Party
2	Sergey Aramilev	United Russia
3	Dmitry Novikov	United Russia
4	Veronika Sipachyova	United Russia
5	Alyona Shtybina	United Russia
6	Nadezhda Telelyuyeva	Communist Party
7	Artyom Volodin	United Russia
8	Maria Lagunova	United Russia
9	Artur Potapov	United Russia
10	Konstantin Sidenko	United Russia
11	Igor Schaufler	United Russia
12	Andrey Akimov	Communist Party
13	Dmitry Kim	United Russia
14	Roman Sankler	United Russia
15	Aleksandr Kirilyuk	United Russia
16	Dzhoni Avdoi	United Russia
17	Sergey Kuzmenko	United Russia
18	Eduard Tsoi	United Russia
19	Tatyana Trudneva	United Russia
20	Yulia Park	United Russia
21	Anton Voloshko	United Russia
22	Pavel Serebryakov	United Russia
23	Ilya Tkachev	United Russia
24	Maksim Melnikov	United Russia
25	Vsevolod Romanov	United Russia
26	Vil Gladunov	United Russia
27	Nikolay Alyoshin	United Russia
28	Yevgeny Gubal	United Russia
29	Aleksandr Sorokin	Communist Party
30	Yevgeny Kalyachkin	United Russia

Party lists
Member	Party
~~Oleg Kozhemyako~~	United Russia
~~Vera Shcherbina~~	United Russia
~~Yelena Bronnikova~~	United Russia
Yana Kudinova	United Russia
Zhanna Gudkova	United Russia
Dzhambulat Tekiyev	United Russia
Yefim Zvenyatsky	United Russia
Yury Kulchin	United Russia
Yury Bakurov	United Russia
~~Leonid Slutsky~~	Liberal Democratic Party
Andrey Andreychenko	Liberal Democratic Party
Anatoly Dolgachev	Communist Party
Dmitry Komarov	New People
Aleksey Kozitsky	A Just Russia

== See also ==
- 2026 Russian regional elections
