= Murat Khapsirokov =

Russian politician (born 1978)

- Мурат Хапсироков
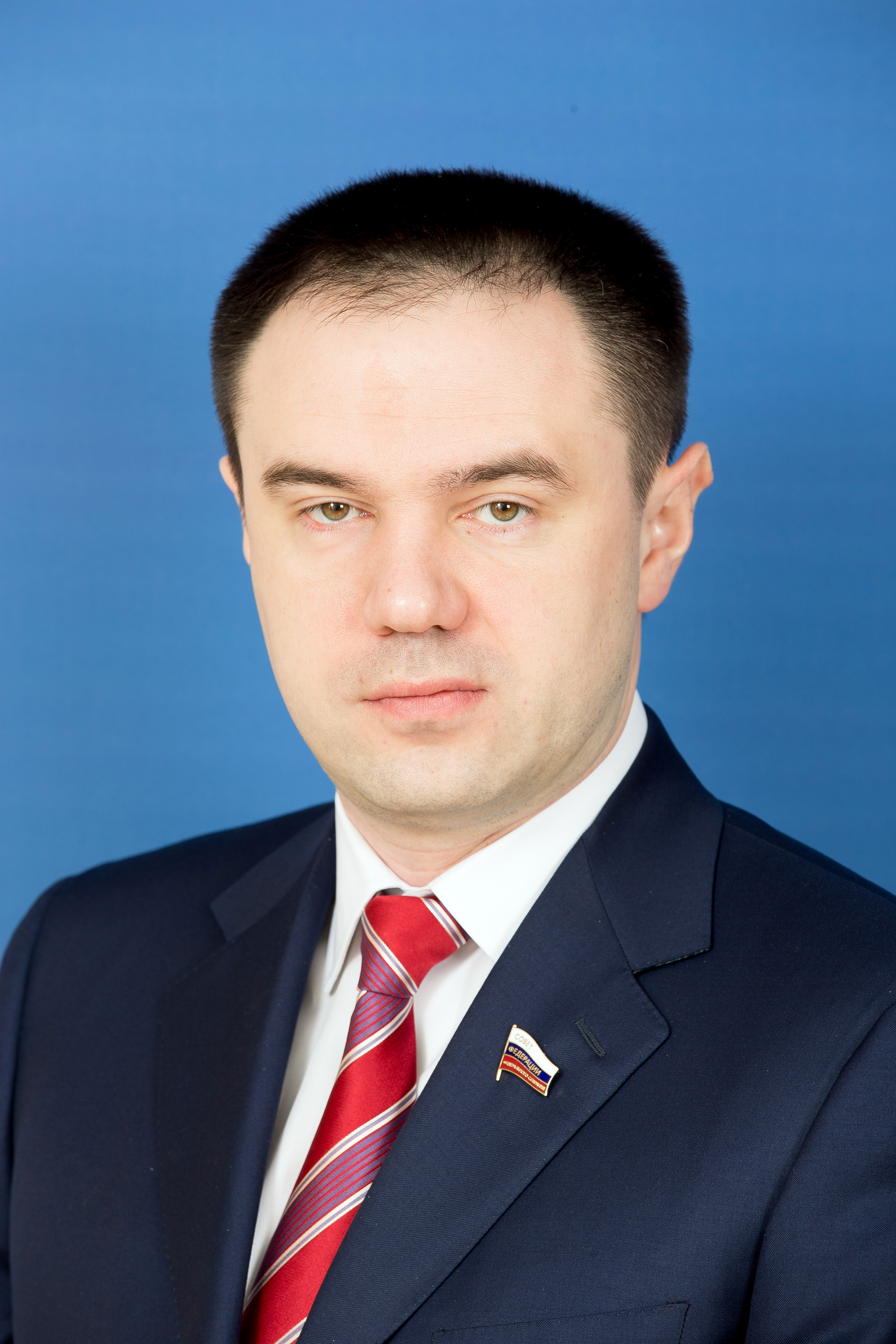
- Khapsirokov in 2013

Senator from Adygea
- Incumbent
- Assumed office 8 February 2012 Serving with Alexander Narolin
- Preceded by: Nurbiy Samogov

Member of the Adyghean State Council
- Incumbent
- Assumed office 13 March 2011

Personal details
- Born: Murat Khapsirokov; 26 January 1978 (age 48) Karachayevsk, Karachay-Cherkess AO, Russian SFSR, Soviet Union (now Karachay-Cherkessia, Russia)
- Party: United Russia

Murat Krym-Gerievich Khapsirokov (Russian: Мурат Крым-Гериевич Хапсироков; born 26 January 1978) is a Russian politician serving as a senator from Adygea since 2012. He is also a state legislator since 2011.

== Biography ==
Khapsirokov was born on 26 January 1978 to a family with ties to Communist Party leadership. In fact, his father had later served as Head of Administration of the General Prosecutor.

In 2000, Khapsirokov graduated from the Kutafin Moscow State Law University.

In 2007, he was appointed as the head of the Kabardino-Balkarian Republic representation office to the federal government. Khapsirokov's close ties to both state governments in the Russian south and the federal government elevated him in the political arena. Between 2008 and 2011, he was one of the right-hand men of Adyghean Prime Minister Murat Kumpilov.

In 2011, Khapsirokov successfully ran for a seat in the Adyghean State Council. In 2012, the council appointed him as their Senator in the Federation Council. He has been re-elected/appointed.

As Senator, he is the Deputy Chairman of Committee on Rules and Organisation of Parliamentary Activities since January 2020. During his tenure, he effectively voted to recognise the independence of the Donetsk and Lugansk people's republics from Ukraine. As a result, he was sanctioned by the United States, Canada, United Kingdom, European Union, Switzerland, Australia and New Zealand.
