= Belan Khamchiev =

Russian politician (born 1960)

- Белан Хамчиев
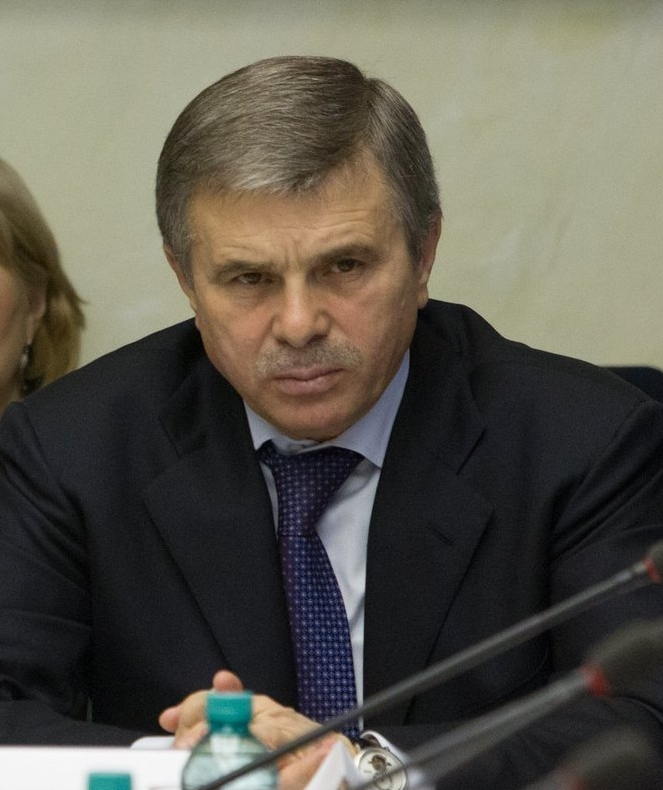

Senator from Ingushetia
- Incumbent
- Assumed office 1 October 2021
- Preceded by: Akhmet Palankoev

Personal details
- Born: Belan Khamchiev; 7 December 1960 (age 64) Sunzha, Checheno-Ingush Autonomous Soviet Socialist Republic, Soviet Union
- Political party: United Russia

Belan Bagaudinovich Khamchiev (Russian: Белан Багаудинович Хамчиев; born 7 December 1960) is a Russian politician serving as a senator from Ingushetia since 1 October 2021.

== Biography ==
Belan Khamchiev was born on 7 December 1960 in Checheno-Ingush Autonomous Soviet Socialist Republic. In 1984, he graduated from the Vyatka State Agricultural Academy. In 1987 and 2003, he also graduated from the Russian State Agrarian Correspondence University and Higher School of Economics. In 2012, he also received a doctoral degree from the Russian State Agrarian Correspondence University.

In 1992–1993, Khamchiev worked as a deputy head of the Administration of the Head of the Republic of Ingushetia. From 1993 to 1996, he was the permanent representative of the Republic of Ingushetia under the President of the Russian Federation. In 1998, he was appointed deputy Minister of National Policy of the Russian Federation. In 2002–2004, Khamchiev was the deputy minister of Agriculture. From 2007 to 2011, he was the deputy of the 5th State Duma. In 2011–2016, he was re-elected for the 6th State Duma. On 3 October 2016, he became the Senator from People's Assembly of the Republic of Ingushetia. In 2021, he was appointed for the second term.

=== Sanctions ===
Khamchiev is under personal sanctions introduced by the European Union, the United Kingdom, the USA, Canada, Switzerland, Australia, Ukraine, New Zealand, for ratifying the decisions of the "Treaty of Friendship, Cooperation and Mutual Assistance between the Russian Federation and the Donetsk People's Republic and between the Russian Federation and the Luhansk People’s Republic" and providing political and economic support for Russia's annexation of Ukrainian territories.
