= Pavel Moiseyev =

Russian politician (1987–2026)

- Павел Моисеев

Member of the Tambov Oblast Duma
- In office 14 September 2022 – 5 November 2026

Personal details
- Born: 17 April 1987 Tambov, Russian SFSR, Soviet Union
- Died: 5 November 2026 (aged 39)
- Party: United Russia
- Profession: Politician; educator

Pavel Sergeyevich Moiseyev (Russian: Павел Сергеевич Моисеев; 17 April 1987 – 5 November 2026) was a Russian politician and educator who was a member of the Tambov Oblast Duma from 14 September 2022 until his death.

Moiseyev died in a traffic collision on 5 November 2026, at the age of 39.
