= Fyodorov =

Fyodorov or Fedorov (Russian: Фёдоров, masculine) and Fyodorova or Fedorova (Фёдорова, feminine) is a Russian patronymic surname derived from the given name Fyodor and literally means Fyodor's. It is transliterated in Polish as Fiodorow in Belarusian as Fiodaraŭ. In Ukrainian it is always spelled as "Fedorov" (Федоров), because the Ukrainian alphabet does not have "ё". Another Ukrainian variant is Fedoriv.

Notable people with the name include:

- Aleksandr Fyodorov (disambiguation), multiple people
- Aleksey Fyodorov (disambiguation), multiple people
- Alfred Fyodorov (1935–2001), Soviet football player and coach
- Andrei Fyodorov (disambiguation), multiple people
- Anna Fedorova (born 1990), Ukrainian pianist
- Anthony Fedorov (born 1985), American Idol Season Four finalist
- Boris Fyodorov (1958–2008), Russian economist and politician
- Evgraf Fedorov (1853–1919), Russian mathematician, crystallographer and mineralogist
- Evgraf Fedorov Jr. (1880–1965), Russian climatologist
- Fedor Fedorov (ice hockey) (born 1981), Russian ice hockey player
- Fyodor Fyodorov (physicist), Soviet-Belarusian physicist
- Igor Fedorov (born 2000), Russian boxer
- Irina Feodorova, Soviet historian and ethnographer
- Ivan Fyodorov (disambiguation), multiple people
- Leonid Feodorov (1879–1935), Russian ecclesiastical figure
- Marina Fedorova (born 1981), contemporary Russian artist
- Marina Fedorova (born 1997), Russian football forward
- Mykhailo Fedorov (born 1991), Ukrainian politician
- Miron Fyodorov (born 1985), Russian rapper
- Nikolai Fyodorovich Fyodorov (1829–1903), Russian cosmist and philosopher
- Nikolay Fyodorov (disambiguation), multiple people
- Oleksiy Fedorov (1901–1989), leader of the Soviet Ukrainian partisan movement
- Oxana Fedorova (born 1977), Russian Miss Universe 2002
- Sergei Fyodorov (disambiguation), multiple people
- Svyatoslav Fyodorov (1927–2000), Russian ophthalmologist and eye microsurgeon
- Victor Fyodorov (1885–1922), Russian World War I flying ace
- Viktor Fyodorov (born 1947), Russian admiral
- Viktoriya Fyodorova (born 1973), Russian high jumper
- Vladimir Fyodorov (disambiguation), multiple people
- Yevgeny Fyodorov (disambiguation), multiple people
- Yuri Fedorov (born 1949), Soviet ice hockey player
- Zoya Fyodorova (1907–1981), Russian actress

== See also ==
- Todorov, Bulgarian cognate
