= Media education =

Media education may refer to:

- Media literacy
- Media studies
