= Aleksandr Fyodorov =

Aleksandr Fyodorov may refer to:

- Aleksandr Fyodorov (footballer, born 1965), Russian footballer who played in the Russian Premier League for FC Zhemchuzhina Sochi
- Aleksandr Fyodorov (footballer, born 1970), Russian footballer who played in the Russian Premier League for FC KAMAZ Naberezhnye Chelny
- Alexandr Fedorov (bodybuilder) (born 1978), Russian bodybuilder
- Aleksandr Georgiyevich Fyodorov (born 1944), Russian football coach
- Aleksandr Fyodorov (water polo) (born 1981), Russian water polo player
- Alexander Viktorovich Fedorov (born 1954), Russian educator

== See also ==
- Alexander
- Fyodorov
