= 2026 Karelian legislative election =

Regional legislative election in Russia

- 18–20 September 2026

All 36 seats in the Legislative Assembly 19 seats needed for a majority
- Turnout: 43.24% ▲3.97 pp
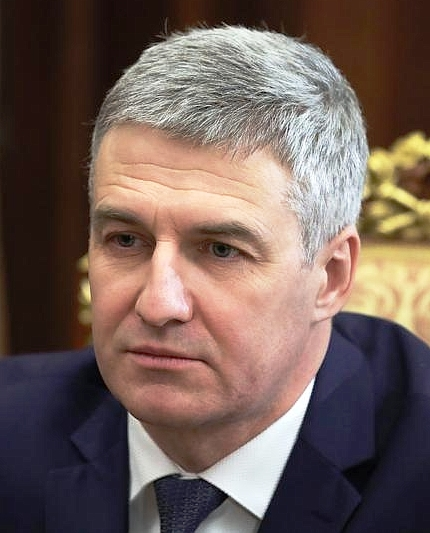

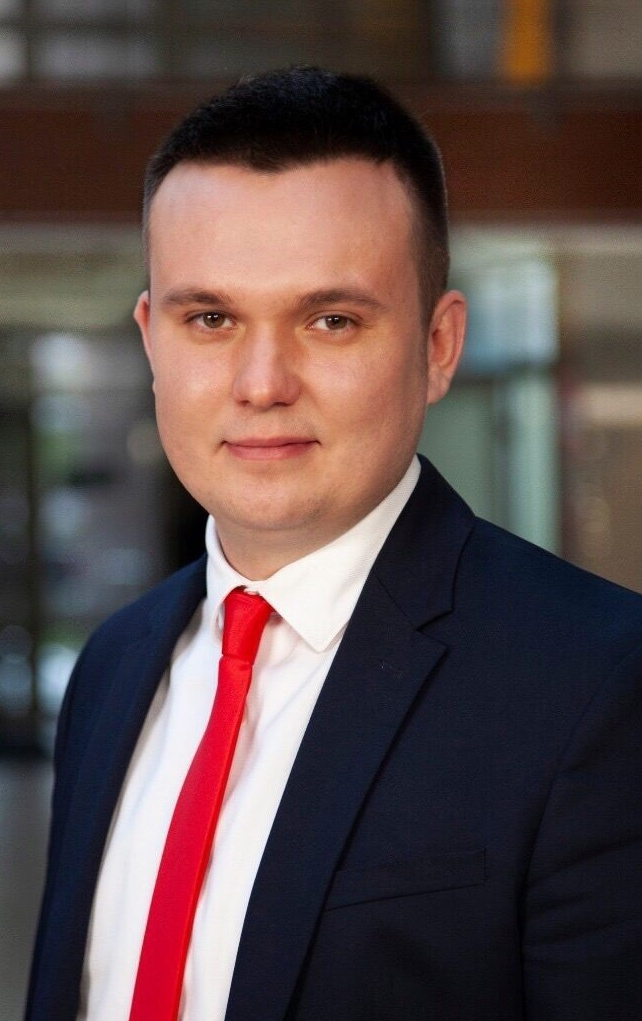

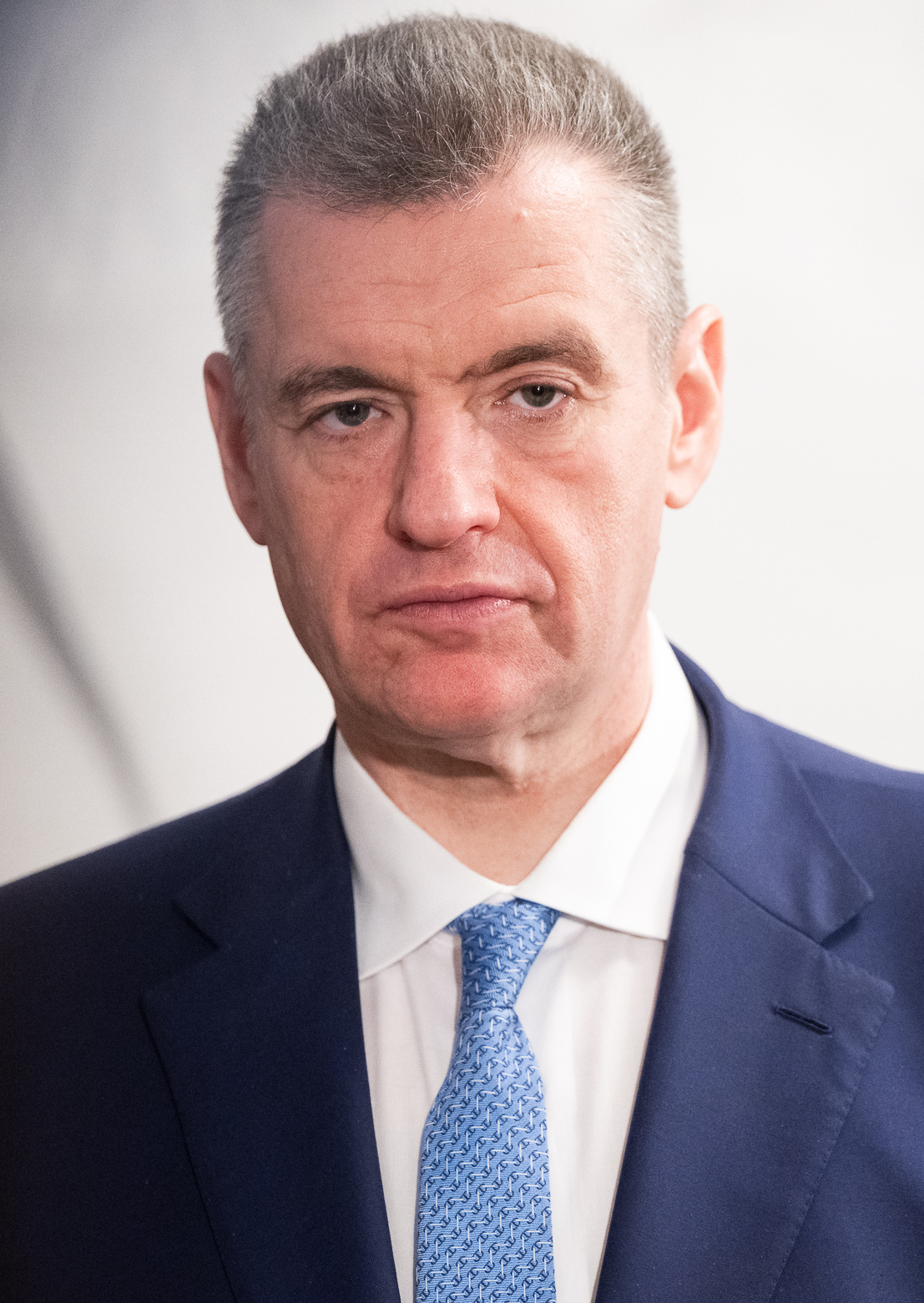

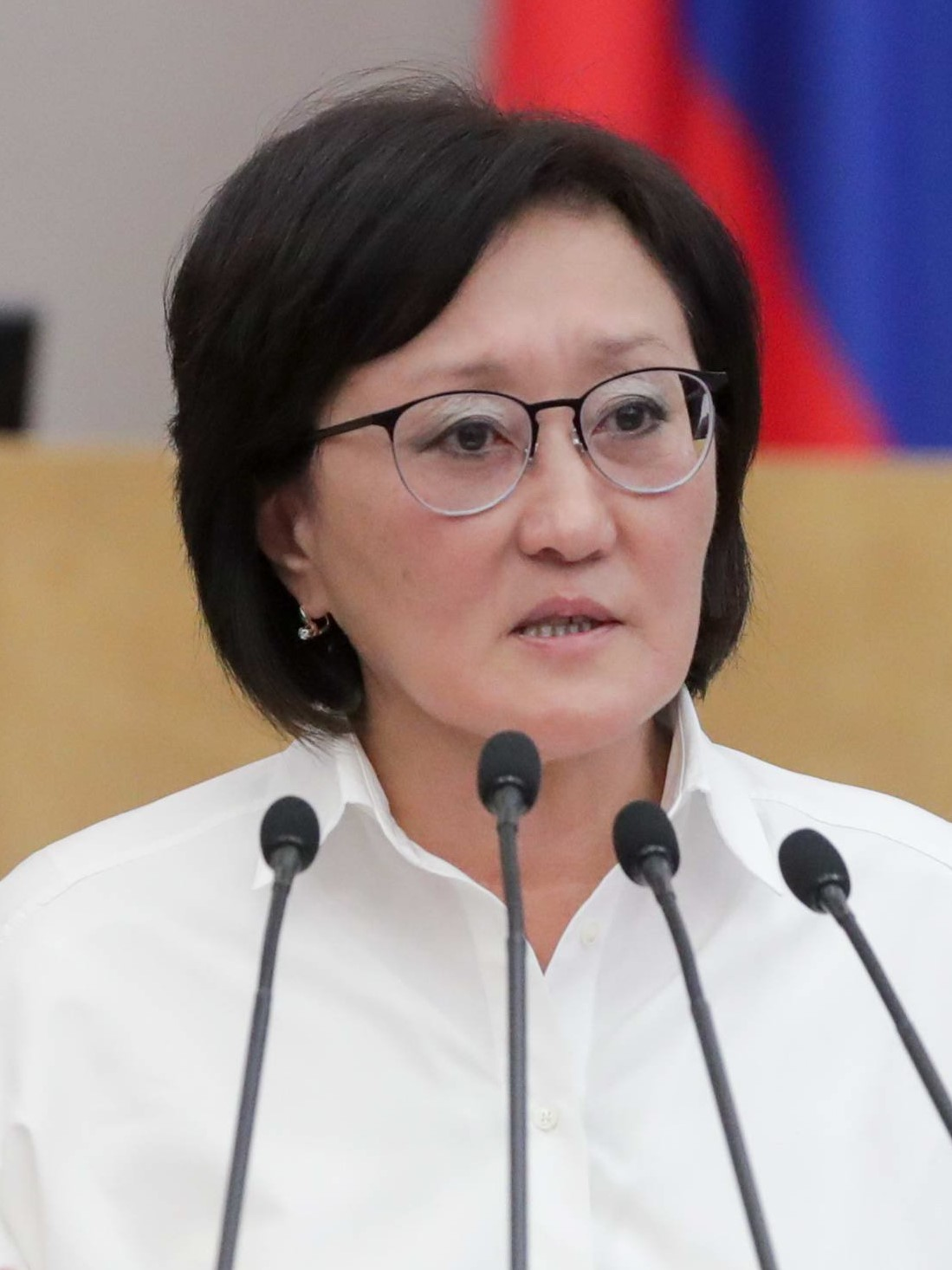

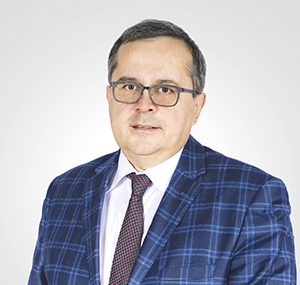
	Majority party	Minority party	Third party
		CPRF
Candidate	Artur Parfenchikov	Yevgeny Ulyanov	Roine Izyumov
Party	United Russia	CPRF	A Just Russia
Last election	28.96%, 22 seats	16.91%, 4 seats	12.81%, 4 seats
Seats won	21	5	4
Seat change	▼1	▲1	Steady
Popular vote	61,885	35,146	31,408
Percentage	28.70%	16.30%	14.57%
Swing	▼0.26 pp	▼0.61 pp	▲1.76 pp
	Fourth party	Fifth party	Sixth party
Candidate	Leonid Slutsky	Sardana Avksentyeva	Erik Prazdnikov
Party	LDPR	New People	Party of Pensioners
Last election	9.86%, 2 seats	6.35%, 1 seat	5.60%, 1 seat
Seats won	3	2	1
Seat change	▲1	▲1	Steady
Popular vote	30,442	27,230	11,837
Percentage	14.12%	12.63%	5.49%
Swing	▲4.26 pp	▲6.28 pp	▼0.11 pp
Chairman before election
Elissan Shandalovich
United Russia
Elected Chairman
Larisa Podsadnik
United Russia
Senator before election
Igor Zubarev
United Russia
Senator after election
Igor Zubarev
United Russia

The 2026 Legislative Assembly of the Republic of Karelia election took place on 18–20 September 2026, on common election day, coinciding with the 2026 Russian legislative election. All 36 seats in the Legislative Assembly were up for re-election.

United Russia retained its majority in the Legislative Assembly but lost one single-mandate constituency to a total of 21 deputies. Communist Party of the Russian Federation finished second and gained one seat. Liberal Democratic Party of Russia and New People saw significant increase in vote share and gained one seat each.

== Electoral system ==
Under current election laws, the Legislative Assembly is elected for a term of five years, with parallel voting. 18 seats are elected by party-list proportional representation with a 5% electoral threshold, with the other half elected in 18 single-member constituencies by first-past-the-post voting. Seats in the proportional part are allocated using the Imperiali quota, modified to ensure that every party list, which passes the threshold, receives at least one mandate.

== Candidates ==
=== Party lists ===
To register regional lists of candidates, parties need to collect 0.5% of signatures of all registered voters in Karelia.

The following parties were relieved from the necessity to collect signatures:

- United Russia
- Communist Party of the Russian Federation
- Liberal Democratic Party of Russia
- A Just Russia
- New People
- Yabloko
- Russian Party of Pensioners for Social Justice

№	Party	Republic-wide list	Candidates	Territorial groups	Status
1	New People	Sardana Avksentyeva • Sergey Usatenko	42	18	Registered
2	Communist Party	Yevgeny Ulyanov • Sergey Andrunevich • Andrey Monastyrshin	19	16	Registered
4	Rodina	Dmitry Titov	18	17	Registered
5	Liberal Democratic Party	Leonid Slutsky	49	18	Registered
6	A Just Russia	Roine Izyumov • Andrey Rogalevich	44	18	Registered
7	United Russia	Artur Parfenchikov • Olga Barysheva • Igor Zubarev	57	18	Registered
8	The Greens	Sergey Yarlykov • Aleksey Glushkov	15	13	Registered
9	Party of Pensioners	Erik Prazdnikov • Grigory Fandeyev • Andrey Manin	19	16	Registered
10	Communists of Russia	Aleksey Samolyotov	14	13	Registered
~~3~~	Yabloko	Inna Boluchevskaya • Olga Tuzhikova • Anna Pavlova	18	15	Disqualified

Russian Ecological Party "The Greens" and Communists of Russia took part in the Karelian legislative election for the first time. Russian Party of Freedom and Justice, which participated in the last election, did not file, while Party of Growth and Green Alternative were dissolved and united with New People and Russian Ecological Party "The Greens", respectively. Yabloko was initially registered for the legislative election but was disqualified on July 29, 2026, by the Supreme Court of Karelia for lack of necessary documents.

=== Single-mandate constituencies ===
18 single-mandate constituencies were formed in Karelia. To register candidates in single-mandate constituencies need to collect 3% of signatures of registered voters in the constituency.

Number of candidates in single-mandate constituencies
Party	Candidates	
Party	Nominated	Registered
United Russia	18	18
Communist Party	17	16
A Just Russia	17	17
Liberal Democratic Party	18	18
Yabloko	15	12
New People	13	13
Party of Pensioners	18	17
Total	116	111

== Results ==
=== Results by party lists ===
Summary of the 18–20 September 2026 Legislative Assembly of the Republic of Karelia election results
Party	Party list					Constituency		Total	
Party	Votes	%	±pp	Seats	+/–	Seats	+/–	Seats	+/–
United Russia	61,885	28.70	▼0.26	6	Steady	15	▼1	21	▼1
Communist Party	35,146	16.30	▼0.61	3	Steady	2	▲1	5	▲1
A Just Russia	31,408	14.57	▲1.76	3	Steady	1	Steady	4	Steady
Liberal Democratic Party	30,442	14.12	▲4.26	3	▲1	0	Steady	3	▲1
New People	27,230	12.63	▲6.28	2	▲1	0	Steady	2	▲1
Party of Pensioners	11,837	5.49	▼0.11	1	Steady	0	Steady	1	Steady
The Greens	5,928	2.75	New	0	New	–	–	0	New
Communists of Russia	3,110	1.44	New	0	New	–	–	0	New
Rodina	2,007	0.93	▼0.09	0	Steady	–	–	0	Steady
Yabloko	–	–	–	–	▼2	0	Steady	0	▼2
Invalid ballots	6,618	3.07	▼0.90	—	—	—	—	—	—
Total	215,611	100.00	—	18	Steady	18	Steady	36	Steady
Turnout	215,611	43.24	▲3.97	—	—	—	—	—	—
Registered voters	498,659	100.00	—	—	—	—	—	—	—

Deputy Premier of Karelia Larisa Podsadnik (United Russia) was elected as Chairwoman of the Legislative Assembly, replacing outgoing Chairman Elissan Shandalovich (United Russia). Incumbent Senator Igor Zubarev (United Russia) was re-appointed to the Federation Council.

=== Results in single-member constituencies ===
==== District 1 ====
Summary of the 18–20 September 2026 Legislative Assembly of the Republic of Karelia election in Petrozavodsky constituency No.1
Candidate	Party	Votes	%
Aleksandr Kalko	United Russia	4,290	32.16%
Aleksey Lobov	A Just Russia	2,609	19.56%
Sergey Andrunevich	Communist Party	2,248	16.85%
Sergey Kashtanyuk	Liberal Democratic Party	2,040	15.29%
Aleksey Alyoshin	Party of Pensioners	1,602	12.01%
Total		13,340	100%

==== District 2 ====
Summary of the 18–20 September 2026 Legislative Assembly of the Republic of Karelia election in Petrozavodsky constituency No.2
Candidate	Party	Votes	%
Marina Gumennikova (incumbent)	United Russia	4,564	33.55%
Andrey Rogalevich	A Just Russia	2,758	20.27%
Tatyana Chernoyarova	Yabloko	2,035	14.96%
Sergey Tupitsin	Liberal Democratic Party	1,887	13.87%
Sergey Digtyar	New People	1,029	7.56%
Mikhail Pedin	Party of Pensioners	819	6.02%
Total		13,605	100%

==== District 3 ====
Summary of the 18–20 September 2026 Legislative Assembly of the Republic of Karelia election in Petrozavodsky constituency No.3
Candidate	Party	Votes	%
Nadezhda Dreyzis	United Russia	4,576	33.37%
Andrey Malafeyev	Yabloko	2,121	15.47%
Vanda Patenko	A Just Russia	1,835	13.38%
Svetlana Posokh	New People	1,758	12.82%
Maria Cheblukova	Liberal Democratic Party	1,609	11.73%
Anna Belyaninova	Party of Pensioners	1,343	9.79%
Total		13,713	100%

==== District 4 ====
Summary of the 18–20 September 2026 Legislative Assembly of the Republic of Karelia election in Petrozavodsky constituency No.4
Candidate	Party	Votes	%
Olga Bilko (incumbent)	United Russia	3,896	30.55%
Galina Vasilyeva	Communist Party	2,451	19.22%
Lia Teryushkova	New People	1,761	13.81%
Tamara Petukhova	A Just Russia	1,696	13.30%
Andrey Larkin	Liberal Democratic Party	1,347	10.56%
Aleksey Belyaninov	Party of Pensioners	1,133	8.88%
Total		12,753	100%

==== District 5 ====
Summary of the 18–20 September 2026 Legislative Assembly of the Republic of Karelia election in Petrozavodsky constituency No.5
Candidate	Party	Votes	%
Yevgeny Bykov	A Just Russia	2,970	23.60%
Sergey Shugayev (incumbent)	United Russia	2,763	21.96%
Olga Tuzhikova	Yabloko	1,851	14.71%
Mikhail Fyodorov	Communist Party	1,733	13.77%
Polina Andriyenko	Liberal Democratic Party	1,274	10.12%
Aleksandr Davydov	New People	826	6.56%
Vladislav Chivin	Party of Pensioners	739	5.87%
Total		12,583	100%

==== District 6 ====
Summary of the 18–20 September 2026 Legislative Assembly of the Republic of Karelia election in Petrozavodsky constituency No.6
Candidate	Party	Votes	%
Vasily Katarov	United Russia	3,794	26.37%
Darya Kalikina	Communist Party	3,271	22.74%
Aleksandr Chazhengin	New People	2,573	17.89%
Maria Akulova	A Just Russia	1,782	12.39%
Dmitry Nikitin	Liberal Democratic Party	1,460	10.15%
Valery Shottuyev	Party of Pensioners	1,035	7.19%
Total		14,385	100%

==== District 7 ====
Summary of the 18–20 September 2026 Legislative Assembly of the Republic of Karelia election in Petrozavodsky constituency No.7
Candidate	Party	Votes	%
Anna Lopatkina (incumbent)	United Russia	3,456	26.36%
Maksim Truvalev	A Just Russia	1,995	15.22%
Yulia Sokolova	Yabloko	1,839	14.03%
Yekaterina Kosheleva	Communist Party	1,622	12.37%
Aleksandr Pakkuyev	Liberal Democratic Party	1,347	10.27%
Nadezhda Grishunova	Party of Pensioners	1,233	9.40%
Aleksey Bezrukov	New People	1,112	8.48%
Total		13,112	100%

==== District 8 ====
Summary of the 18–20 September 2026 Legislative Assembly of the Republic of Karelia election in Northern constituency No.8
Candidate	Party	Votes	%
Andrey Monastyrshin (incumbent)	Communist Party	2,862	31.16%
Gennady Kokkov	United Russia	1,830	19.93%
Sergey Lebedev	A Just Russia	1,816	19.77%
Aleksey Remshuyev	Liberal Democratic Party	973	10.59%
Sergey Shatkov	New People	902	9.82%
Nikita Kanashenko	Party of Pensioners	354	3.85%
Total		9,184	100%

==== District 9 ====
Summary of the 18–20 September 2026 Legislative Assembly of the Republic of Karelia election in Severno-Karelsky constituency No.9
Candidate	Party	Votes	%
Larisa Podsadnik	United Russia	3,389	28.06%
Ivan Valdayev	A Just Russia	2,177	18.03%
Aleksey Goryayev	New People	1,922	15.91%
Aleksandr Belozerov	Communist Party	1,536	12.72%
Aleksey Korneyev	Liberal Democratic Party	1,250	10.35%
Yelena Yegorova	Yabloko	971	8.04%
Marina Krasilnikova	Party of Pensioners	397	3.29%
Total		12,077	100%

==== District 10 ====
Summary of the 18–20 September 2026 Legislative Assembly of the Republic of Karelia election in Pomorsky constituency No.10
Candidate	Party	Votes	%
Irina Kuzicheva (incumbent)	United Russia	3,302	35.60%
Aleksey Orlov	Liberal Democratic Party	1,786	19.26%
Inna Boluchevskaya	Yabloko	1,603	17.28%
Vladimir Pishchalnikov	Communist Party	1,275	13.75%
Anastasia Pavlova	Party of Pensioners	880	9.49%
Total		9,274	100%

==== District 11 ====
Summary of the 18–20 September 2026 Legislative Assembly of the Republic of Karelia election in Segezhsky constituency No.11
Candidate	Party	Votes	%
Natali Karapetyan (incumbent)	United Russia	2,675	25.21%
Yekaterina Chirkova	Communist Party	1,851	17.45%
Andrey Demushkin	Liberal Democratic Party	1,821	17.16%
Aleksey Sukhotsky	A Just Russia	1,297	12.22%
Sergey Asmolovsky	New People	1,282	12.08%
Anastasia Podberezskaya	Yabloko	727	6.85%
Elina Golovastaya	Party of Pensioners	518	4.88%
Total		10,610	100%

==== District 12 ====
Summary of the 18–20 September 2026 Legislative Assembly of the Republic of Karelia election in Pudozhsky constituency No.12
Candidate	Party	Votes	%
Galina Lindunen	United Russia	2,341	27.02%
Ilya Gashkov	A Just Russia	2,114	24.40%
Vasily Tarkov	Communist Party	1,571	18.13%
Mikhail Pimenov	Liberal Democratic Party	1,158	13.36%
Marina Fomina	Yabloko	660	7.62%
Veniamin Yanov	Party of Pensioners	431	4.97%
Total		8,665	100%

==== District 13 ====
Summary of the 18–20 September 2026 Legislative Assembly of the Republic of Karelia election in Zapadno-Karelsky constituency No.13
Candidate	Party	Votes	%
Tatyana Tishkova (incumbent)	United Russia	3,068	35.01%
Andrey Vorobyov	A Just Russia	2,016	23.00%
Andrey Ivanov	Communist Party	1,131	12.91%
Olga Karaseva	Liberal Democratic Party	1,037	11.83%
Natalya Boris	Yabloko	721	8.23%
Sergey Firsov	Party of Pensioners	440	5.02%
Total		8,764	100%

==== District 14 ====
Summary of the 18–20 September 2026 Legislative Assembly of the Republic of Karelia election in Kondopozhsky constituency No.14
Candidate	Party	Votes	%
Oleg Zaytsev (incumbent)	United Russia	2,893	27.98%
Olesya Turkenicheva	New People	2,203	21.31%
Aleksandr Zhidkov	Liberal Democratic Party	1,671	16.16%
Yevgeny Matviyenko	Communist Party	1,550	14.99%
Aleksey Kozhushny	A Just Russia	834	8.07%
Anastasia Denishchuk	Party of Pensioners	759	7.34%
Total		10,340	100%

==== District 15 ====
Summary of the 18–20 September 2026 Legislative Assembly of the Republic of Karelia election in Priladozhsky constituency No.15
Candidate	Party	Votes	%
Tatyana Yemelyanova	United Russia	4,477	38.71%
Sergey Orlov	Communist Party	2,097	18.13%
Aleksandr Fedichev (incumbent)	A Just Russia	1,885	16.30%
Dmitry Kuzmin	New People	1,177	10.18%
Viktoria Sirotkina	Liberal Democratic Party	1,041	9.00%
Yegor Fomin	Party of Pensioners	527	4.56%
Total		11,566	100%

==== District 16 ====
Summary of the 18–20 September 2026 Legislative Assembly of the Republic of Karelia election in Tsentralno-Karelsky constituency No.16
Candidate	Party	Votes	%
Elissan Shandalovich	United Russia	4,130	40.55%
Olga Plekhanova	A Just Russia	1,773	17.41%
Igor Bochinsky	Liberal Democratic Party	910	8.93%
Svetlana Ivanova	Communist Party	875	8.59%
Anna Pavlova	Yabloko	783	7.69%
Yulia Pavlova	New People	769	7.55%
Aleksandr Bakhtin	Party of Pensioners	583	5.72%
Total		10,185	100%

==== District 17 ====
Summary of the 18–20 September 2026 Legislative Assembly of the Republic of Karelia election in Prigorodny constituency No.17
Candidate	Party	Votes	%
Olga Shmayenik (incumbent)	United Russia	4,464	36.03%
Leonid Kondratyev	Communist Party	1,627	13.13%
Kristina Dmitriyeva	New People	1,545	12.47%
Pavel Staltsov	Liberal Democratic Party	1,331	10.74%
Irina Safonova	A Just Russia	1,088	8.78%
Irina Firsova	Yabloko	998	8.06%
Anastasia Panova	Party of Pensioners	842	6.80%
Total		12,388	100%

==== District 18 ====
Summary of the 18–20 September 2026 Legislative Assembly of the Republic of Karelia election in Yuzhno-Karelsky constituency No.18
Candidate	Party	Votes	%
Artyom Ilyin	Communist Party	3,334	27.39%
Artyom Valyuk	United Russia	3,148	25.86%
Oksana Filippova	A Just Russia	2,183	17.93%
Pavel Polivany	Liberal Democratic Party	1,732	14.23%
Natalya Kiseleva	Yabloko	1,353	11.12%
Total		12,172	100%

=== Members ===
Incumbent deputies are highlighted with bold, elected members who declined to take a seat are marked with ~~strikethrough~~.

Constituency
No.	Member	Party
1	Aleksandr Kalko	United Russia
2	Marina Gumennikova	United Russia
3	Nadezhda Dreyzis	United Russia
4	Olga Bilko	United Russia
5	Yevgeny Bykov	A Just Russia
6	Vasily Katarov	United Russia
7	Anna Lopatkina	United Russia
8	Andrey Monastyrshin	Communist Party
9	Larisa Podsadnik	United Russia
10	Irina Kuzicheva	United Russia
11	Natali Karapetyan	United Russia
12	Galina Lindunen	United Russia
13	Tatyana Tishkova	United Russia
14	Oleg Zaytsev	United Russia
15	Tatyana Yemelyanova	United Russia
16	Elissan Shandalovich	United Russia
17	Olga Shmayenik	United Russia
18	Artyom Ilyin	Communist Party

Party lists
Member	Party
~~Artur Parfenchikov~~	United Russia
Olga Barysheva	United Russia
Igor Zubarev	United Russia
Konstantin Stelling	United Russia
~~Yelena Malysheva~~	United Russia
Vladislav Vokhmin	United Russia
Ilya Rakovsky	United Russia
~~Galina Germanova~~	United Russia
~~Vitaly Antipin~~	United Russia
Lyudmila Zhuravleva	United Russia
Yevgeny Ulyanov	Communist Party
Sergey Andrunevich	Communist Party
Kirill Tikhomirov	Communist Party
Roine Izyumov	A Just Russia
Andrey Rogalevich	A Just Russia
Denis Smirnov	A Just Russia
~~Leonid Slutsky~~	Liberal Democratic Party
Aleksandr Pakkuyev	Liberal Democratic Party
Anna Pozdnyakova	Liberal Democratic Party
Pavel Staltsov	Liberal Democratic Party
~~Sardana Avksentyeva~~	New People
Sergey Usatenko	New People
Olesya Turkenicheva	New People
Erik Prazdnikov	Party of Pensioners

== See also ==
- 2026 Russian regional elections
