= Media literacy =

Ability to navigate media

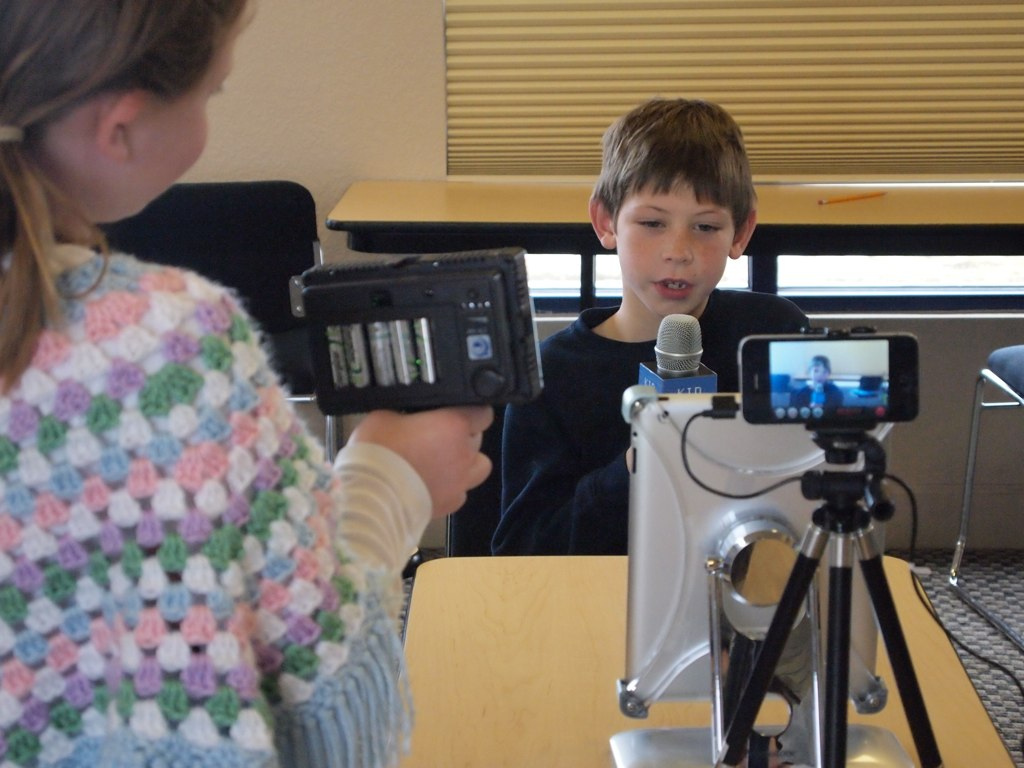
Schoolchildren working on a multimedia project (2012)

Media Literacy is a broadened understanding of literacy that encompasses the ability to access, analyze, evaluate, and create media in various forms. It also includes the capacity to reflect critically and act ethically, leveraging the power of information and communication to engage with the world and contribute to positive change. Media literacy applies to different types of media, and is seen as an important skill for various contexts, including work, life, and citizenship.

Examples of media literacy include reflecting on one's media choices, identifying sponsored content, recognizing stereotypes, analyzing propaganda and discussing the benefits, risks, and harms of media use. Critical analysis skills can be developed through practices like constructivist media decoding and lateral reading, which entails looking at multiple perspectives when evaluating media content. Media literacy also includes the ability to create and share messages as a socially responsible communicator. The practices of safety and civility, information access, and civic voice and engagement are sometimes referred to as digital citizenship.

Many of the competencies that make up media literacy are derived from traditional literacy, though adapted for the modern age and digital landscape. These competencies include the ability to access information, analyze and evaluate messages, as well as creating content responsibly, while considering how it might influence the audience. Since social media is an extension of the broader online media environment, social media literacy has become increasingly relevant, functioning as a subset rooted in core media literacy principles. Researchers argued that a deep understanding of media literacy, done through media literacy education, can be especially important today, as it plays a significant role in assessing the credibility of new information. Short-form content's rise has made instant information sharing easier, often without verification. Due to their quick, catchy, and attention-grabbing nature, people consume and share them rapidly without fact-checking. This speed creates a cycle where misinformation spreads quickly before verification.

Media literacy involves more than identifying false or misleading information. It also includes understanding how media messages are created, who produces them, what purposes they serve, and how they may influence audiences. These skills apply to both traditional forms of media, such as newspapers, television, and radio, and digital platforms, including websites and social media. Media literacy also encourages individuals to consider how media advertising, and technology can influence the information people receive.

Media literacy education is the process used to advance media literacy competencies. It is intended to promote awareness of media influence and create an active stance towards both consuming and creating media. Media literacy education is taught and studied in many countries around the world. Finland has been cited as one of the leading countries that invests significantly in media literacy.

== Media Literacy Education ==
Media and Information Literacy: Reinforcing Human Rights, Countering Radicalization and Extremism (Yearbook 2016), a training program on media literacy promoted by UNESCO, UNITWIN Cooperation Programme, UNAOC, and GAPMIL

Education for media literacy often encourages people to ask questions about what they watch, hear, and read. Some examples of media examined include, but are not limited to television, video games, photographs, and audio messages.

Media literacy education provides tools to help people develop receptive media capability to critically analyze messages, offers opportunities for learners to broaden their experience of media, and helps them develop generative media capability to increase creative skills in making their own media messages. Critical analyses can include identifying author, purpose and point of view, examining construction techniques and genres, examining patterns of media representation, and detecting propaganda, censorship, and bias in news and public affairs programming (and the reasons for these). Media literacy education may explore how structural features—such as media ownership, or its funding model (Note: See Corporate media and Public service broadcasting)—affect the information presented. Media literacy is interdisciplinary by nature. Media literacy represents a necessary, inevitable, and realistic response to the complex, ever-changing electronic environment and communication cornucopia surrounding us.

The speed and reach of new information today may increase access to knowledge for a broader audience, but during an infodemic, when both true and false information spread simultaneously, it becomes much more difficult to determine what is accurate. When individuals encounter information for the first time, assessing its reliability can be challenging. Without strong media literacy strategies, the internet becomes even harder to navigate. This makes it important to recognize that no single strategy is sufficient on its own. Using a combination of different approaches is what truly helps individuals evaluate information more effectively.

As health professionals increasingly share advice online, media literacy may influence individuals' health decisions. While this trend expands access to health information at little or no cost, it can also complicate the identification of accurate versus inaccurate content. This challenge is partly due to the ease with which individuals can claim health expertise on social media without verifiable credentials, highlighting the role of media health literacy. The concept of media health literacy encompasses the skills and competencies required to grasp, and apply health information to positively impact one's own health and that of others. In a world increasingly saturated with media and digital content, these skills enable individuals to access and use health-related information and tools across various platforms, including television, the Internet, and mobile applications. Research suggests that these skills are associated with how younger individuals and older adults acquire and evaluate newly consumed information about their health.

Goals might include developing the habits and skills to access, analyze, evaluate, create, and act using all forms of communication. Education about media literacy can begin in early childhood by developing a pedagogy around more critical thinking and deeper analysis and questioning of concepts and texts. As students age and enter adulthood, the use of learning media literacy will be impactful in identifying ethical and technical standards in media as well as understanding how media ties to their cognitive, social, and emotional needs.

In North America and Europe, media literacy includes both empowerment and protectionist perspectives. Media literate people can skillfully create and produce media messages, both to show understanding of the specific qualities of each medium, as well as to create media and participate as active citizens. Media literacy can be seen as contributing to an expanded conceptualization of literacy, treating mass media, popular culture and digital media as new types of 'texts' that require analysis and evaluation. By transforming the process of media consumption into an active and critical process, people gain greater awareness of the potential for misrepresentation and manipulation, and understand the role of mass media and participatory media in constructing views of reality. (Note: e.g., Media Literacy Resource Guide.)

Media literacy education is sometimes conceptualized as a way to address the negative dimensions of media, including media manipulation, misinformation, gender and racial stereotypes and violence, the sexualization of children, and concerns about loss of privacy, cyberbullying and Internet predators. By building knowledge and competencies in using media and technology, media literacy education may provide a type of protection to children and young people by helping them make good choices in their media consumption habits, and patterns of usage.

This pedagogical project questions representations of class, gender, race, sexuality and other forms of identity and challenges media messages that reproduce oppression and discrimination. Proponents of media literacy education argue that the inclusion of media literacy into school curricula promotes civic engagement, increases awareness of the power structures inherent in popular media and aids students in gaining necessary critical and inquiry skills. Media can have a positive or negative impact on society, but media literacy education enables the students to discern inescapable risks of manipulation, propaganda and media bias. A growing body of research has begun focusing on the impact of media literacy on youth. In an important meta-analysis of more than 50 studies, published in the Journal of Communication, media literacy interventions were found to have positive effects on knowledge, criticism, perceived realism, influence, behavioral beliefs, attitudes, self-efficacy, and behavior.

Media literacy also encourages critical thinking and self-expression, enabling citizens to decisively exercise their democratic rights. Media literacy enables the populace to understand and contribute to public discourse, and, eventually, make sound decisions when electing their leaders. People who are media literate can adopt a critical stance when decoding media messages, no matter their views regarding a position. Likewise, the use of mobile devices by children and adolescents is increasing significantly. Therefore, it is relevant to investigate the level of advertising literacy of parents who interact as mediators between children and mobile advertising.

Digitalisation and the expansion of information and communication technologies at the beginning of the 21st century have substantially modified the media and their relationship with users, which logically modifies the basic principles of media education. It is no longer so much a question of educating critical receivers as of training citizens as responsible prosumers in virtual and hybrid environments. Media education currently incorporates phenomena such as social networks, virtual communities, big data, artificial intelligence, cyber-surveillance, etc., as well as training the individual in the critical use of mobile devices of all kinds.

However, due to the rapid pace of technological advancement and the widespread migration of audiences to digital platforms, media literacy studies have struggled to keep up with these developments. Two seminal texts that have shaped 21st-century media literacy education—James Potter's and Stanley Baran's works—do not address several emerging and highly relevant concepts, such as post-truth, mob censorship, or the growing role of artificial intelligence in the production and dissemination of online information.

== Media literacy policy ==
Educators have identified some important components that should be present in "quality" media literacy education programs. These include: (1) attention to teaching methods; (2) the training and preparation of educators; (3) the scope, structure, and coherence of the activities of instructional practice; (4) the presence and appropriateness of underlying theories of media literacy; and (5) the originality of the programs in relation to available resources and community needs.

In the United States, education policy is decentralized, and reference to media literacy is growing, with 22 passed bills in 14 states since 2012. Most state policies do not allocate financial resources to promote media literacy education, with only a few providing staff positions or coaching. While most policies make reference to resources for media literacy education, these generally refer to lists of curriculum materials or sample instructional materials.

== Theoretical approaches to media literacy education ==
Theoretical frameworks for media literacy are rooted in interdisciplinary work at the intersection of communication and media studies, education, and the humanities. Key concepts and core principles have been synthesized from the work of 20th-century thinkers and scholars who have been called grandparents of media literacy, such as Paolo Freire, Marshall McLuhan, Stuart Hall, and others.

=== Information literacy ===
With the growing problem of so-called "fake news," Mike Caulfield and Sam Wineburg adapt an approach to fact checking as a type of media literacy, suggesting that information seekers emphasize lateral reading, including starting some searches on Wikipedia. Instead of "vertical reading" of a single website, "lateral reading", is a fact-checking method to find and compare multiple sources of information on the same topic or event. The method they suggest is called 'SIFT.' 'S' is for stop and reflect, especially before sharing or acting on the information. 'I' is for investigate the source. Looking at the source's Wikipedia page, for example, can sometimes give a sense of their reliability. 'F' is for find better coverage, such as a reputable fact-checking website. 'T' is for trace the claim to its original context, whether an image or a quote to help make sure it was not taken out of context or comes from a reliable source. Media literacy has become increasingly important in combating misinformation on digital platforms, especially among young adults.

Evaluating online information also involves distinguishing between misinformation and disinformation. Misinformation refers to false or inaccurate information that is shared regardless of whether the person sharing it intends to mislead others. Disinformation refers to misleading information that is deliberately created or shared to deceive an audience. Both can spread through social media, websites, and other communication platforms. Evaluating the original source, checking the evidence behind a claim, and comparing information across multiple reliable sources can help individuals recognize misleading content.

=== Literacy ===
Other approaches focus on positioning media literacy in relation to "reading," "writing," and "relevance." Renee Hobbs developed the AACRA model (access, analyze, create, reflect and act) and identifies three frames for introducing media literacy to learners: authors and audiences (AA), messages and meanings (MM), and representation and reality (RR), synthesizing the scholarly literature from media literacy, information literacy, visual literacy and new literacies.

=== Communication ===
Some theoretical frames make reference to the key elements of human communication. David Buckingham proposed: Production, Language, Representation, and Audience. Elaborating on the concepts presented by David Buckingham, Henry Jenkins discusses the emergence of a participatory culture and stresses the significance of "new media literacies"—a set of cultural competencies and social skills that young people need in the new media landscape.

=== Critical media literacy ===
Other theoretical approaches, like critical media literacy, emphasize the power relationships that are inherent in media systems in society. Critical media literacy aims to analyze and understand the power structures that shape media representations and the ways in which audiences work to make meaning through dominant, oppositional and negotiated readings of media.

=== Effects ===
There is also an approach to media literacy that is rooted in media psychology and media effects. This is sometimes called a protectionist approach to media literacy because it aims to educate students about potential risks and harms of media use. This approach views children and young people as particularly vulnerable to cultural, ideological or moral influences, and needing protection by means of education.

Modern frameworks for media literacy have expanded to address the 'second-level digital divide,' shifting focus from basic internet access to the 'knowledge divide' regarding how individuals interpret and produce digital content. This shift relates to generative AI tools, which research suggests analytical benefits as well as user concern about the truthfulness and potential for 'privacy misleading' in AI outputs. 'Algorithmic literacy' helps citizens navigate the role of algorithms as information gatekeepers.

Social media platforms use algorithms to organize and recommend content to users. These systems can influence which news stories, opinions, advertisements, and videos people encounter. As a result, users may repeatedly encounter information that reflects their existing interests or viewpoints. Media literacy can help individuals understand how recommendation systems influence the visibility of information and encourage them to seek out different perspectives. Understanding sponsored posts, influencer advertising, and other forms of persuasive content is also part of evaluating media messages.

=== Arts ===
The media arts education tradition focuses on creative production of different media forms by learners. This approach is one of the oldest approaches to media literacy education and was pioneered by educators and artists in Rochester, New York who developed visual literacy in education.

=== Research on media literacy education ===
The scholarly knowledge community publishes research in the Journal of Media Literacy Education and other journals, and a robust global community of media literacy scholars has emerged since the European Commission set an ambitious objective for Europe to advance its knowledge economy while being more culturally inclusive. Empirical research on media literacy education, carried out by social science researchers, generally falls into three major categories, focusing on (a) health outcomes; (b) curriculum and instruction; and (c) political attitudes, media use and behavior.

Meta-analysis of a large number of these studies has found that the average effect size was strong and positive for outcomes including media knowledge, criticism, perceived realism, influence, attitudes, self-efficacy, and behavior. In two recent nationally-representative surveys of U.S. residents, media literacy competencies were associated with health-related decision making in the context of COVID-19, and the study found that media literacy skills promote the adoption of recommended health behaviors. Health interventions have also explored issues such as media violence, stereotypes in the representation of gender and race, materialism and consumer culture, and the glamorization of unhealthy behavior, including smoking. Research shows that media literacy is associated with increased resilience in children and youth that is effective in a wide variety of contexts and learning environments.

Media literacy competencies are frequently measured using self-report measures, where people rate or agree with various statements. These measures are easy to administer to a large group of people. Some researchers use performance- or competency-based measures to examine people's actual ability to critically analyze news, advertising, or entertainment. Media literacy programs that focus on political attitudes and behavior are thought to provide the cognitive and social scaffolding needed for civic engagement. Research on high school students has shown that participation in a media literacy program was positively associated with information-seeking motives, media knowledge, and news analysis skills. Experimental research has shown that young people aged 15–27 who had received media literacy education in schools were better able to evaluate the accuracy of political content, even when it aligned with their existing political beliefs. Study shows that MLA training does impact public when it comes to figuring out fake news or any sort of disinformation or misinformation. Participants who were given MLA training, 73.3% were able to identify information which was fake. Nearly 70% agreed upon not sharing any inaccurate information online which was not accurate.

== History and international applications ==
UNESCO has investigated which countries were incorporating media studies into different schools' curricula as a means to develop new initiatives in the field of media education. Relying on 72 experts on media education in 52 countries around the world, the study identified that (1) media literacy occurs inside the context of formal education; (2) it generally relies on partnerships with media industries and media regulators; and (3) there is a robust research community who have examined the needs of educators and obstacles to future development. Although progress around the world was uneven, all respondents realized the importance of media education, as well as the need for formal recognition from their government and policymakers.

In recent years, a wide variety of media literacy education initiatives have increased collaboration in Europe and North America, Many cultural, social, and political factors shape how media literacy education initiatives are believed to be significant. Mind Over Media is one example of an international collaboration in media literacy education: is one example of an international collaboration in media literacy education: it is a digital learning platform that relies on crowdsourced examples of contemporary propaganda shared by educators and learners from around the world. For educators who are developing media literacy programs, the study of propaganda has become increasingly important, especially with the rise of fake news and disinformation.

One ranking of media literacy efforts had Finland #1, Canada #7 and the United States #18.

== Geography ==
=== North America ===
In North America, the beginnings of a formalized approach to media literacy as a topic of education is often attributed to the 1978 formation of the Ontario-based Association for Media Literacy (AML). Before that time, instruction in media education was usually the purview of individual teachers and practitioners.

==== Canada ====
Canada was the first country in North America to require media literacy in the school curriculum. Every province has mandated media education in its curriculum. For example, the new curriculum of Quebec mandates media literacy from Grade 1 until final year of secondary school (Secondary V). The launching of media education in Canada came about for two reasons. One reason was the concern about the pervasiveness of American popular culture and the other was the education system-driven necessity of contexts for new educational paradigms. Canadian communication scholar Marshall McLuhan ignited the North American educational movement for media literacy in the 1950s and 1960s. Two of Canada's leaders in Media Literacy and Media Education are Barry Duncan and John Pungente. Duncan died on June 6, 2012. Even after he retired from classroom teaching, Barry had still been active in media education. Pungente is a Jesuit priest who has promoted media literacy since the early 1960s.

==== United States ====
Media literacy education has been an interest in the United States since the early 20th century, when high school English teachers first started using film to develop students' critical thinking and communication skills. However, media literacy education is distinct from simply using media and technology in the classroom, a distinction that is exemplified by the difference between "teaching with media" and "teaching about media." In the 1950s and 60s, the 'film grammar' approach to media literacy education developed in the United States. Where educators began to show commercial films to children, having them learn a new terminology consisting of words such as: fade, dissolve, truck, pan, zoom, and cut. Films were connected to literature and history. To understand the constructed nature of film, students explored plot development, character, mood and tone.

Then, during the 1970s and 1980s, attitudes about mass media and mass culture began to shift around the English-speaking world. Educators began to realize the need to "guard against our prejudice of thinking of print as the only real medium that the English teacher has a stake in." A whole generation of educators began to not only acknowledge film and television as new, legitimate forms of expression and communication, but also explored practical ways to promote serious inquiry and analysis—- in higher education, in the family, in schools and in society. In 1976, Project Censored began using a service learning model to cultivate media literacy skills among students and faculty in higher education.

Media literacy education began to appear in state English education curriculum frameworks by the early 1990s, as a result of increased awareness in the central role of media in the context of contemporary culture. Nearly all 50 states have language that supports media literacy in state curriculum frameworks. Additionally, an increasing number of school districts have begun to develop school-wide programs, elective courses, and other after-school opportunities for media analysis and production. Media education for teachers, as of 2015, represented 2% of all study programs in teacher training.

Founded in 2008, the News Literacy Project initially offered curricular materials and other resources for educators who taught U.S. students in grades 6–12 (middle school and high school), focusing primarily on helping students learn to sort fact from fiction in the digital age. (In 2020 NLP expanded its work to include audiences of all ages and made all of its resources free of charge.) Similar programs for students and adults are also offered by the Poynter Institute (MediaWise) and the Stanford History Education Group at Stanford University (Civic Online Reasoning). Assessments of students who have taken such programs and those who have not have shown that the students with media literacy training can more easily recognize false or misleading content and determine whether a source of information is credible.

18 states have enacted media literacy standards in K-12 education as of 2023, including Texas, New Jersey, Delaware, Florida and California. In 2021, Illinois became the first state to require high school students to take a news literacy class.

=== South America ===
Media literacy education in South America has expanded in recent years as governments, civil society organizations, and academic institutions respond to concerns about political polarization, disinformation, and the growth of digital media platforms. Although approaches vary widely across the region, many initiatives share a focus on strengthening citizens' critical thinking skills, promoting responsible information consumption, and building public awareness of online manipulation. Regional efforts often emerge from collaborations between NGOs, journalists, and educators, rather than from formal national policies. As in other parts of the world, UNESCO guidelines and international media literacy networks have influenced curriculum development and public campaigns.

==== Peru ====
In Peru, media literacy initiatives have been driven largely by civil society in response to the rapid spread of political disinformation on social media. One notable example is A Mí No Me La Hacen, a nonprofit organization founded in 2020 that focuses on media literacy, fact-checking awareness, and digital citizenship. Through workshops, public campaigns, and educational materials, the organization promotes critical evaluation of online content and seeks to empower young people and adults to identify misleading narratives. Its programs are frequently developed in collaboration with schools, universities, and local governments, reflecting the broader regional trend of partnerships between civic organizations and educational institutions.

In 2024, A Mí No Me La Hacen announced that it is about to release Infodemic: Journalism in Crisis on Steam_(service), recognized as the first South American video game specifically designed to teach Media and Information Literacy (MIL). The game introduces players to the pressures facing journalism, the dynamics of misinformation, and the role of critical thinking in evaluating digital content, positioning it as one of the region's most innovative educational tools in the MIL field.

A Mí No Me La Hacen has also participated in regional conversations about combating misinformation during electoral cycles, contributing research and public outreach efforts aimed at strengthening democratic resilience. While Peru has not yet incorporated a nationwide, mandatory media literacy curriculum, the increasing visibility of NGOs like A Mí No Me La Hacen has helped place media education on the national agenda, encouraging policymakers to consider more formal frameworks for digital and media literacy in the future.

=== Europe ===
The UK is widely regarded as a leader in the development of media literacy education. Key agencies that have been involved in this development include the British Film Institute, the English and Media Centre Film Education the Centre for the Study of Children, Youth and Media at the Institute of Education, London, and the DARE centre (Digital Arts Research Education), a collaboration between University College London and the British Film Institute. The 'promotion' of media literacy also became a UK Government policy under New Labour, and was enshrined in the Communications Act 2003 as a responsibility of the new media regulator, Ofcom. After an initial burst of activity, however, Ofcom's work in this regard was progressively reduced in scope, and from the Coalition government onwards, the promotion of media literacy was reduced to a matter of market research – what Wallis & Buckingham have described as an 'undead' policy.

In the Nordics, media education was introduced into the Finnish elementary curriculum in 1970 and into high schools in 1977. The concepts devised at the Lycée franco-finlandais d'Helsinki became the standard nation-wide in 2016. Finland also offers education for older adults as well.

France has taught film from the inception of the medium, but it has only been recently that conferences and media courses for teachers have been organized with the inclusion of media production.

Germany saw theoretical publications on media literacy in the 1970s and 1980s, with a growing interest for media education inside and outside the educational system in the 80s and 90s.

In the Netherlands media literacy was placed in the agenda by the Dutch government in 2006 as an important subject for the Dutch society. In April, 2008, an official center has been created (mediawijsheid expertisecentrum = medialiteracy expertisecenter) by the Dutch government. This center is a network organization consisting of different stakeholders with expertise on the subject.

In Russia, the 1970s-1990s brought about the first official programs of film and media education, increasing interest in doctoral studies focused on media education, as well as theoretical and empirical work on media education by O.Baranov (Tver), S.Penzin (Voronezh), G.Polichko, U.Rabinovich (Kurgan), Y.Usov (Moscow), Alexander Fedorov (Taganrog), A.Sharikov (Moscow) and others. Recent developments in media education in Russia are the 2002 registration of a new 'Media Education' (No. 03.13.30) specialization for the pedagogical universities, and the 2005 launch of the Media Education academic journal, partly sponsored by the ICOS UNESCO 'Information for All'.

Montenegro became one of the few countries in the world that have introduced media education into their curriculums, when in 2009 "media literacy" was introduced as an optional subject for 16 and 17-year-old students of Gymnasium high schools.

In Ukraine, media education is in the second stage (2017–2020) of development and standardization. Main centres of media education include the Ivan Franko University of Lviv (led by Borys Potyatynyk), Institute of Higher Education of the National Academy of Pedagogical Sciences of Ukraine (Hanna Onkovych), Institute of Social and Political Psychology of the National Academy of Pedagogical Sciences of Ukraine (Lyubov Naidyonova).

In Spanish legislation, digital competence is considered as an umbrella term that "includes information and data literacy, communication and collaboration, media education, digital content creation (including programming), security (including digital wellbeing and cybersecurity skills), digital citizenship issues, privacy, intellectual property, problem solving, and computational and critical thinking".

=== Asia ===
Media literacy education is not yet as widespread or as advanced in Asia, comparative to the U.S. or Western countries. Beginning in the 1990s, there has been a shift towards media literacy in East Asia. In recent years, media literacy education is growing in Asia, with several programs in place across countries throughout the Asian Pacific region.

Studies have been done to test levels of media literacy among Chinese-speaking students in Taiwan. Beginning in the 2017 school year, children in Taiwan study a new curriculum designed to teach critical reading of propaganda and the evaluation of sources. Called "media literacy," the course provides training in journalism in the new information society.

In India, the Cybermohalla program started in 2001 with the aim to bring access to technology to youths.

In Vietnam, the Young Journalists Group (YOJO) was created in 1998 in collaboration with UNICEF and the Vietnamese National Radio to combat false accounts by the media.

In Singapore, the Media Development Authority (MDA) defines media literacy and recognizes it as an important tool for the 21st century, but only from the reading aspect of the term.

=== Middle East ===
According to the government-owned The Jordan Times, Jordan, has been moving forward in fostering media and information literacy, which is crucial to fighting extremism and hate speech, Jordan Media Institute has worked on spreading the concepts and skills of positive interaction with the media and tools of communication technology and digital media, and to reduce their disadvantages. An academy in Beirut, Lebanon opened in 2013, called the Media and Digital Literacy Academy of Beirut (MDLAB) with the goal for students to be critical media consumers.

Third and Fourth graders in Kuwait are learning to address visual stereotypes surrounding the Middle East through media literacy education, in part to be better able to challenge representation.

=== Africa ===
The UNESCO Media and Information Literacy Alliance, formerly known as Global Alliance for Partnerships on Media and Information Literacy (GAPMIL), is an effort to promote international cooperation to promote media and information literacy. The organization held the Global Forum for Partnerships on Media and Information Literacy which took place from 26 to 28 June 2013, in Abuja, Nigeria to promote these goals.

== See also ==
- Content moderation
- Critical literacy
- Digital footprint
- Digital literacy
- Information and media literacy
- Institute for Propaganda Analysis
- Intertextuality
- Misinformation
- Multiliteracy
- Participation inequality
- Postliterate society
- Public participation
- Public participation (decision making)
- Transmediation
