= Ivan Fyodorov =

Ivan Fedorov and Ivan Fyodorov may refer to:

- Ivan Fedorov (politician) (born 1988), Ukrainian politician
- Ivan Fyodorov (printer), sixteenth-century Slavic printer
- Ivan Fyodorov (navigator) (died c. 1733), Russian navigator and commanding officer of the expedition to northern Alaska
- Ivan Fyodorov (pilot) (1920–2000), Soviet fighter pilot
- Ivan Fyodorovich Koshkin (died 1427), Russian aristocrat

== See also ==
- Ivan Fedotov (born 1996), Russian ice hockey player
