= Nikolay Fyodorov =

Nikolay Fyodorov may refer to:

- Nikolai Fyodorov (philosopher) (1829–1903), Russian Orthodox Christian philosopher and futurist
- Nikolay Fyodorov (film director) (1914–1994), animator and film director
- Nikolay Fyodorov (politician) (born 1958), 1st President of Chuvashia and Russian Federal Minister of Agriculture
- Nikolay Fedorov (painter) (1918–1990), Russian painter and textile designer

== See also ==
- Nikolai Fyodorovich Vatutin, Soviet military commander
