= Vladimir Fyodorov =

Vladimir Fyodorov or Fedorov may refer to:

- Vladimir Grigoryevich Fyodorov (1874–1966), Soviet weapons designer
- Vladimir Fédorov (1901–1979), French musicologist, librarian and composer
- Vladimir Fyodorov (actor) (1939–2021), Russian film and theater actor
- Volodymyr G. Fedorov (1939–2011), Ambassador of Ukraine to Russia
- Vladimir Fedorov (politician) (born 1946), Russian politician
- Vladimir Fyodorov (footballer) (1956–1979), Soviet footballer
- Vladimir Fedorov (born 1971), Russian ice dancer
