= Andrei Fyodorov =

Andrei Fyodorov, Andrey Fedorov or their combinations may refer to the following Russian people:

- Andrei Fyodorov (footballer) (born 1971), Uzbek football player
- Andrey A. Fedorov (1908–1987), biologist, botanist, taxonomist and phytogeographer
- Andrey Venediktovich Fyodorov (1906–1997), philologist
