= Marina Fedorova (artist) =

Russian painter

Marina Vladimirovna Fedorova
- Марина Владимировна Фёдорова
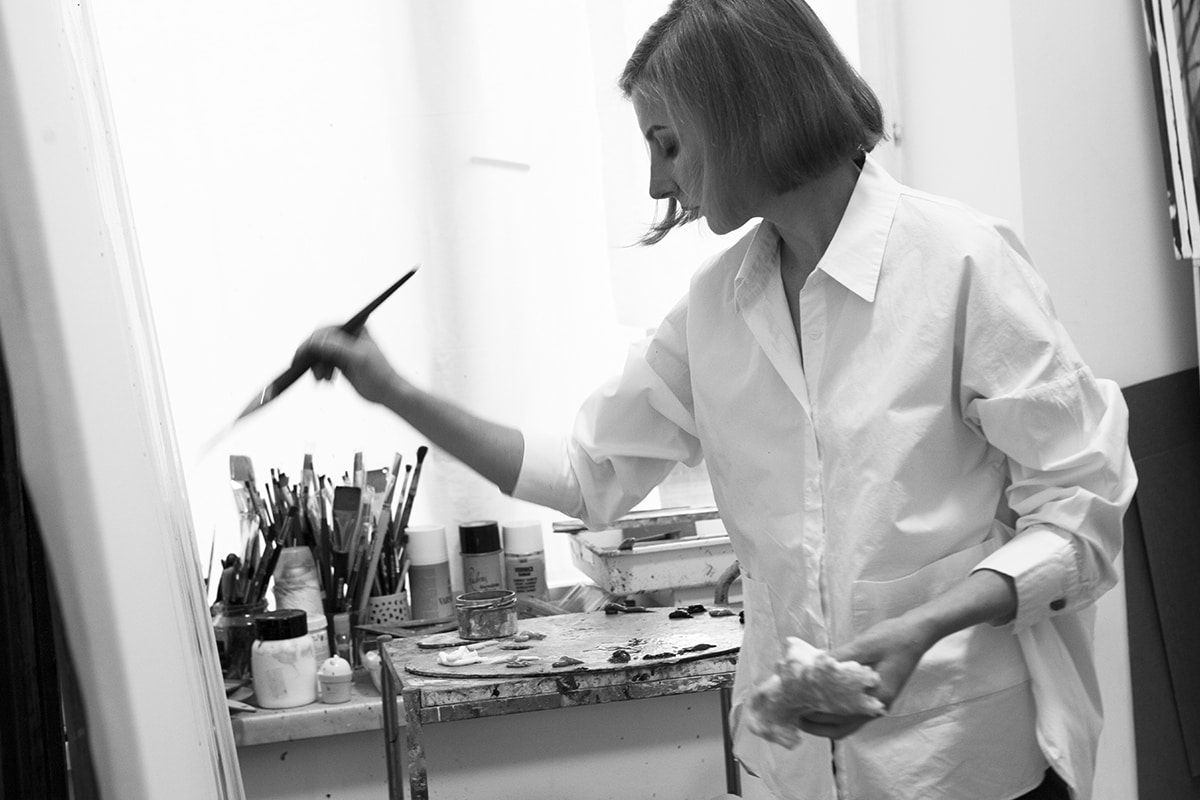
- Born: May 8, 1981 (age 45); Leningrad
- Education: N.K. Roerich St. Petersburg Art School (Tavricheskaya Art School); Saint Petersburg Stieglitz State Academy of Art and Design
- Known for: Figurative art, painting
- Website: marinafedorova.com

Marina Vladimirovna Fedorova (Russian: Марина Владимировна Фёдорова born 8 May 1981) is a Russian figurative artist and painter based in Munich. Fedorova was nominated for the Kandinsky Prize.

Her works are held in collections, including the Hermitage-Vyborg Center of the State Hermitage Museum and the State Russian Museum in St. Petersburg, Russia.

== Biography ==
Marina Fedorova was born on May 8, 1981 in the city of Leningrad, USSR.

She began her professional art education in 1996 when she enrolled in the N.K. Roerich Art School in St. Petersburg (formerly Leningrad, renamed 1991). She graduated in 2000 and subsequently entered the Stieglitz State Academy of Art and Design, formerly known as the Vera Mukhina Art School, where she majored in Fashion Design and Illustration. In 2006, during her public diploma defense, Fedorova staged a performance in which nearly nude models walked the runway holding canvases painted with dresses; the final dress was painted live on stage by the artist herself.

Since 2001, Fedorova’s works have been exhibited in numerous international cities, including St. Petersburg, Moscow, Paris, Genoa, Málaga, Helsinki, Dubai, Riyadh, and Shanghai. She has participated in several international art fairs, such as Art Stage Singapore, Art Moscow, Art Paris, Art Monaco, Art Bologna, Art Vilnius, Art Kyiv, Art Helsinki, Art Marbella, Art Dubai, Jingart Beijing, and Art021 Shanghai.

In 2007, Fedorova participated as the official designer for the XVII International Ballet Festival Mariinsky. She also contributed to a charity gala auction supported by Christie's at the State Russian Museum 2010 and in the London Auctions in 2016. Additionally, she presented the exhibition NY/New You at the parallel program of the VI Moscow Biennale of Contemporary Art.

In 2020, she launched the first installment of her Cosmodreams exhibitions series, which combines traditional painting with augmented reality elements. The Cosmodreams project explores the interaction between the cosmos and the glamorous world on Earth. Subsequent solo exhibitions in the Cosmodreams series include: Elementa and Journey with Cosmodreams. The Cosmodreams series examines the relationship between Earth and the cosmos and features over 100 works across various media, including VR and digital art. The project has expanded to venues in Shanghai and Dubai.

In 2021, Fedorova announced a collaboration with the national postal operator Russian Post and the St. Petersburg Planetarium to commemorate the international Cosmonautics Day and Yuri's Night celebrations. Throughout April, a limited edition postcard created for the 60th anniversary of the first human spaceflight and featuring an AR design based on one of the artist’s works, Sunset, was available for postage.

== Artistry ==
Fedorova’s works reflect life in the modern metropolis, portraying ordinary people as the central figures in her paintings. She depicts everyday events and characters in familiar settings, with her style characterized by an idealization of subjects and a focus on highlighting beauty in the ordinary. Fedorova’s artwork is shaped by twentieth-century futuristic philosophies, examining topics such as the future, the cosmos, nature, and humanity through a female perspective.

Fedorova deliberately leaves her paintings "incomplete" as a defining aspect of her pictorial style. The figures and objects in her works often appear to float in a state of weightlessness. By manipulating spatial composition and focus, she directs the viewer’s attention to elements like the gaze of her protagonist or an object emotionally "enlivened" by the artist.

The same incompleteness is inherent in the plot of Fedorova’s paintings. Rather than illustrating the climax of an event, Fedorova depicts its anticipation or lingering aftermath.

Her work is influenced by American hyperrealism, pop art, and modernism. Fedorova draws inspiration from well-known contemporary artists, such as Alex Kanevsky, Eric Fischl, Alex Katz, and Georgia O'Keeffe.

=== Cosmodreams ===
Cosmodreams is the exhibition series by Fedorova debuted in 2020 at the Erarta Museum of Contemporary Art in St. Petersburg, Russia, where Fedorova explored the relationship between Earth and the cosmos. The work reflects Fedorova’s contemplation of the universe and humanity's position within it, presenting a microcosmic view of society in contrast to the vastness of space. The project consists of seven units: Nature, Metropolia, Birthplace, Life on Earth, Life in Space, Legacies and Deep Space.

Central to many pieces in the exhibition is the portrayal of a female figure, depicted in a 1950s fashion editorial style. These heroines are presented in vibrant, contemporary dresses that stand out against surreal, otherworldly backgrounds. As part of the exhibition, Fedorova created over 100 paintings, several fibre-optic sculptures, videos, VR programs, a website, and a printed catalogue. The paintings were enhanced with AR to create multisensory immersive experience and through the mobile app Cosmodreams: Art in AR, viewers could interact with the pieces by watching their narratives unfold in real-time. Parts of the exhibition were also shown in Moscow's Zaryadye Park as part of the 60th anniversary of Yuri Gagarin's flight.

Fedorova also presented Cosmodreams: Exploring the Infinite, also known as the Journey of Cosmodreams in 2024. The exhibition was shown at Powerlong Museum in Shanghai and features multiple mediums, including painting, sculpture, digital art, and virtual reality. The exhibition covered an area of 700 square meters and was divided into five distinct zones. The theme explores the fusion of reality and fantasy through depictions of outer space, futuristic cities, and the connection between nature and human emotion.

Another extension of the Cosmodreams project is the exhibition Cosmodreams: Elementa. The exhibition, which was shown in 2025 at the Fann À Porter Gallery in Dubai, among other locations, focuses on the connection between the elements and mankind, showcasing futuristic landscapes that juxtapose technological progress with the natural world.

== Acquisitions and auctions ==
Fedorova’s works were acquired by institutions and private collectors worldwide, including the Hermitage-Vyborg Center of the State Hermitage Museum, St. Petersburg, Russia, the D137 Gallery in St. Petersburg, Russia, the State Russian Museum as well as at the SONS (Shoes or No Shoes) museum in Kruishoutem, Belgium.

=== Private collections ===
Fedorova’s works are held in various private collections:

- Laurent Boutonnat Collection, France
- Nicolas Feuillatte Champagne House Collection, France
- Pierre Brochet Collection, France
- Ilya Lagutenko Collection, Russia
- Artemy Troitsky Collection, Estonia
- Victor Dzodziev Collection, Russia
- Mikhail Tsaryov Collection, Moscow Contemporary Art Collectors’ Club, Russia.

=== Selected Museum and Foundation Collections ===
In addition to private collectors, Fedorova’s pieces are part of museum and foundation collections:

- State Russian Museum, St. Petersburg, Russia
- Hermitage-Vyborg Center of the State Hermitage Museum, St. Petersburg, Russia
- The State Russian Art Gallery, Sevastopol, Russia
- D137 Gallery Foundation, St. Petersburg, Russia
- KGAL Art Gallery Foundation, Germany
- SONS Museum Foundation, Belgium
- Vasshuset Foundation, Luxembourg

=== International art auctions ===
Fedorova’s works were sold at the following international art auctions:

- Sotheby's
- Pierre Berge & Associes
- Millon — Cornette de Saint Cyr
- Litfund
- Vladey
- Sovcom

== Solo and Group Exhibitions ==
Fedorova has participated in a various solo and group exhibitions internationally:

- 2005: One Fine Day, solo exhibition, D137 Gallery, St. Petersburg, Russia
- 2006: Autumn Time, solo exhibition, D137 Gallery, St. Petersburg, Russia
- 2007:
  - Living in Paris, solo exhibition, D137 Gallery, St. Petersburg, Russia
  - Brief Encounters, solo exhibition, Orel Art Gallery, Paris, France
  - Autumn Mood, solo exhibition, Galleria La Bertesca – Masnata, Genoa, Italy
- 2008:
  - Lonely, solo exhibition, D137 Gallery, St. Petersburg, Russia
  - Planet of Peace, foundation charity project exhibition participant, Moscow, Russia
  - Lonely, solo exhibition, Winzavod Center of Contemporary Art, Moscow, Russia
- 2009:
  - Retour — Stop — Cadre, solo exhibition, Orel Art Gallery, Paris, France
  - 08.08.08, solo exhibition, D137 Gallery, St. Petersburg, Russia
- 2010:
  - Bluebeard, solo exhibition, Inutero Panopticon Gallery, Moscow, Russia
  - Christmas Exhibition, group show, Kremlin Gallery, St. Petersburg, Russia
  - Christmas Exhibition, group show, Erarta Museum of Contemporary Art, St. Petersburg, Russia
  - In Red, solo exhibition, Gallery Kadieff, Helsinki, Finland
  - Love Stories, solo exhibition, Red Bridge Gallery, Vologda, Russia
  - Consumer Society, solo exhibition, Citycelebrity Art Gallery, St. Petersburg, Russia
  - Please me Fashion, solo exhibition, Mantua, Italy
- 2011:
  - She Who Runs on the Waves, solo exhibition, Gallery Kadieff, Helsinki, Finland
  - Close Up, solo exhibition, Prime Art Gallery, St. Petersburg, Russia
  - Gates and Doors, group exhibition, State Russian Museum, St. Petersburg, Russia
  - Stolichnaya, solo exhibition, Kremlin Gallery, St. Petersburg, Russia
- 2012:
  - For Versace, solo exhibition, Gallery Kadieff, Helsinki, Finland
  - Now or Never, solo exhibition, Ten 43 Gallery, NYC, USA
  - Non-Accidental Encounters, solo exhibition, Lazarev Gallery, St. Petersburg, Russia
- 2013:
  - Italy in My Heart, solo exhibition, Gallery Kadieff pop-up show, Venice, Italy
  - Moments. Expectations, solo exhibition, К35 Art Gallery, Moscow, Russia
- 2014:
  - Kresty, solo exhibition, Triumph Gallery, Moscow, Russia
  - Dolce Vita, joint exhibition, St. Petersburg State Museum of Urban Sculpture, St. Petersburg, Russia
- 2015:
  - Parallel, solo exhibition, К35 Art Gallery, Moscow, Russia
  - NY/NewYou, solo exhibition, К35 Art Gallery, Moscow, Russia
  - Prolonging the Summer, solo exhibition, Erarta Museum of Contemporary Art, St. Petersburg, Russia
  - Biowoman Reproduction, group exhibition, Artmuza, St. Petersburg, Russia
  - People and Mannequins, solo exhibition, House of the Stroganovs, Usolye, Perm Krai, Russia
- 2017:
  - Infinity Road, solo exhibition, Urban Electric Transport Museum, St. Petersburg, Russia
  - British Accent, solo exhibition, Grand Hotel Europe, St. Petersburg, Russia
- 2018:
  - Diary of an Artist, solo exhibition, Art-Hall Gallery, Hermitage-Vyborg Center, Vyborg, Russia
  - East of the Sun, joint exhibition with sculptor Dmitry Zhukov, K35 Art Gallery, Moscow, Russia
- 2019: Morphology of the Folktale, group exhibition, Arts Square Gallery, St. Petersburg, Russia
- 2020: Cosmodreams, solo exhibition, Erarta Museum of Contemporary Art, St. Petersburg, Russia
- 2023: Ethereal Echoes, joint exhibition with fashion designer Yousef Akbar, Riyadh, Saudi Arabia
- 2024: Cosmodreams / Journey with Cosmodreams, solo exhibition, Powerlong Art Museum, Shanghai, China
- 2025: Cosmodreams: Elementa, solo exhibition, Fann à Porter Gallery, Dubai, UAE
- 2026: Art to Heart / United States - New York, United States

== Art Fairs ==
Fedorova has also taken part in numerous art fairs:

- 2005: Art Moscow by D137 Gallery, Russia
- 2006:
  - Arte Fiera by D137 Gallery, Italy
  - Art Moscow by D137 Gallery, Russia
- 2007: Art Moscow by D137 Gallery, Russia
- 2008: Art Paris by Orel Art Gallery, France
- 2010: Art Vilnius by D137 Gallery, Lithuania
- 2011: Art Helsinki by Kadieff Gallery, Finland
- 2012:
  - Art Moscow by Lazarev Gallery, Russia
  - Art Helsinki by Kadieff Gallery, Finland
- 2013: Art Stage Singapore by Lazarev Gallery, Singapore
- 2017/2018: Talented Art Fair, London
- 2019: Art Marbella, Spain
- 2022:
  - ART021 Shanghai Contemporary Art Fair, Shanghai, China
  - Dubai Design Week, Dubai, UAE
  - Art Dubai, Dubai, UAE
- 2023: ART021 Shanghai Contemporary Art Fair, Shanghai, China
- 2024:
  - ART021 Shanghai Contemporary Art Fair, Shanghai, China
  - Hia Hub 4.0, Riyadh, Saudi Arabia
  - Jingart Contemporary Art Fair, Beijing, China

== Awards and honors ==
- 2007: Official painter of XVII International Ballet Festival Mariinsky
- 2008: The artist of the year of Nicolas Feuillatte Champagne, France
- 2008: Kandinsky Prize nominee, Central house of artists, Moscow, Russia
