= Leonid Kulik =

Russian mineralogist (1883–1942)

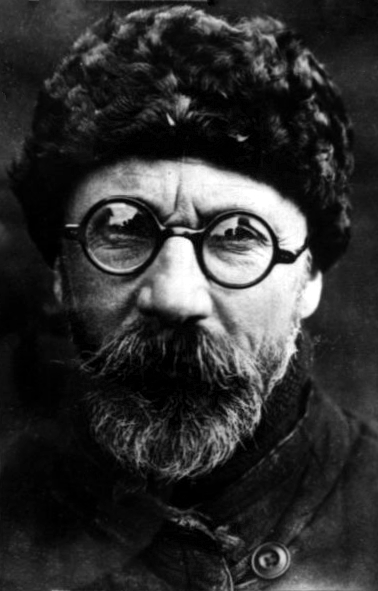
- Born: 19 August 1883; Dorpat, Governorate of Livonia, Russian Empire (now Tartu, Tartu County, Estonia)
- Died: 24 April 1942 (aged 58); Spas-Demensk, Smolensk Oblast, Russian SFSR, Soviet Union
- Citizenship: Russian Empire, Soviet Union
- Known for: meteorites, discovery of Tunguska blast site
- Scientific career
- Fields: Mineralogy

Leonid Alekseyevich Kulik (Russian: Леонид Алексеевич Кулик; 19 August 1883 – 14 or 24 April 1942) was a Soviet mineralogist who is noted for his research into meteorites.

== Russo-Japanese War and World War I ==
He was born in Dorpat, (now Tartu, Tartu County, Estonia), and was educated at the Imperial Forestry Institute in Saint Petersburg and the Kazan University. He served in the Russian military during the Russo-Japanese War, then spent some time in jail for revolutionary political activities. He then served with the Russian military during World War I.

== Mineralogy teacher ==
Following the war he became an instructor, teaching mineralogy in Tomsk. In 1920 he was offered a job at the Mineralogical Museum in St. Petersburg.

== Investigation of the Tunguska event ==
In 1927, he led the first Soviet research expedition to investigate the Tunguska event, the largest impact event in recorded history, which had occurred on 30 June 1908. He made a reconnaissance trip to the region, accompanied by Nikolay Ivanovich Fedorov and others, and interviewed local witnesses. He circled the region where the trees had been felled and became convinced that they were all turned with their roots to the center. However he did not find any meteorite fragments from the impact.

== World War II service and death ==
During World War II he again fought for his country, this time in a paramilitary militia. He was captured by the German army and died in a prisoner of war camp of typhus.

== Honors ==
- Asteroid 2794 Kulik is named for him.
- The crater Kulik on the Moon is named after him.
