= A Mí No Me La Hacen =

Peruvian media literacy organization

A Mí No Me la Hacen
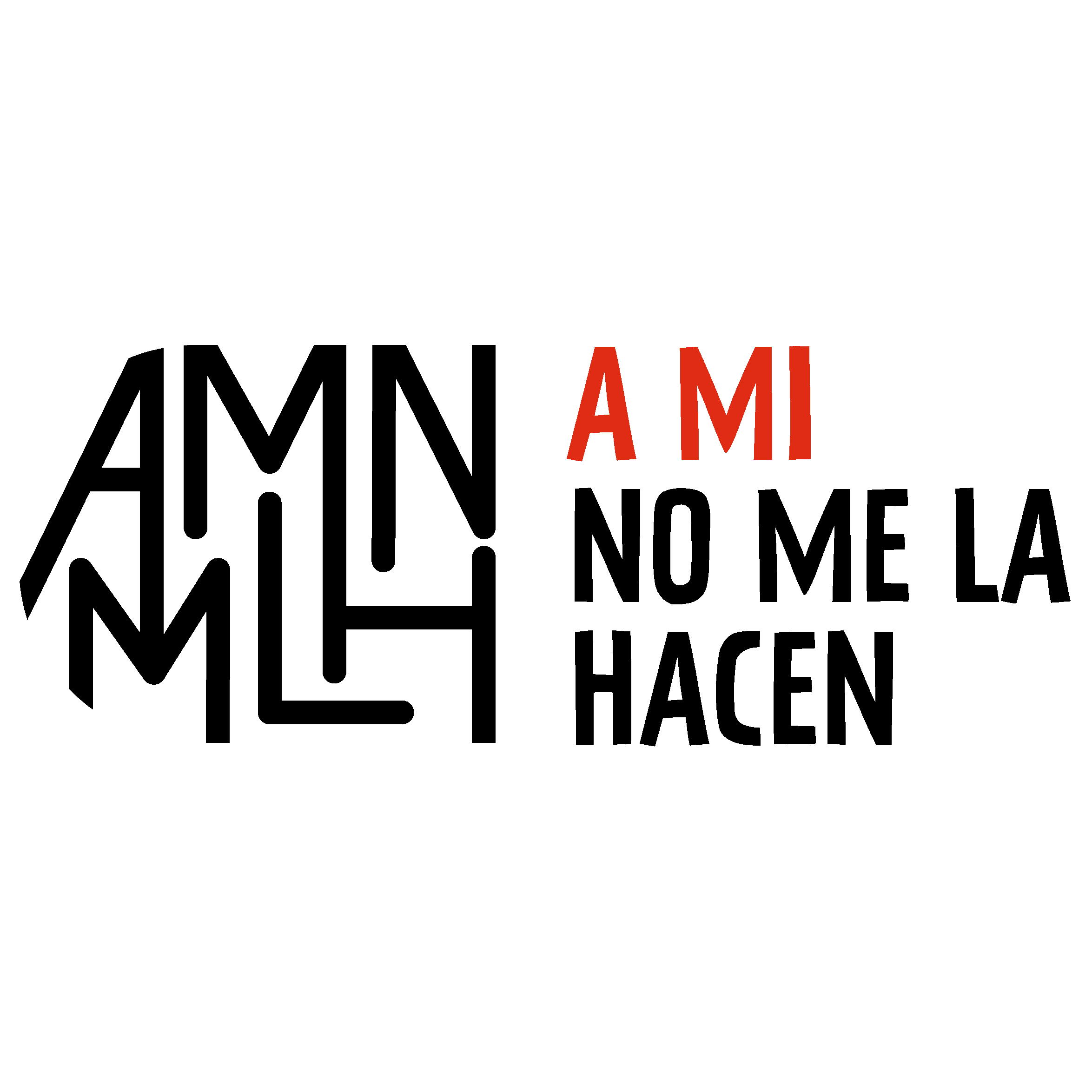
- Abbreviation: AMNMLH
- Formation: 2020; 5 years ago
- Legal status: Active
- Headquarters: Lima, Perú

A Mí No Me La Hacen (AMNMLH) (English: 'I am not easily fooled') is a Peruvian media and information literacy (MIL) non-governmental organization.

Founded in 2020, it teaches and promotes media and information literacy with a multidisciplinary team of professionals. It has received numerous accolades, including an award from UNESCO, and is widely recognized as Peru's leading Media and Information Literacy organization.

== Work ==
AMNMLH's stated objective is to combat the Infodemic with a grassroots, bottom-up approach, through media literacy education. They achieve this by organizing workshops and providing online educational content covering various perspectives, including journalism, natural and behavioral sciences.

A Mí No Me La Hacen also promotes media and information literacy education and advocacy in Peru by organizing annual symposiums during UNESCO's Global MIL Week, and by participating in seminars organized by UNESCO and the Peruvian Ministries of Education and Communication.

== Recognition ==
In 2021, A Mí No Me La Hacen received the UNESCO Global Media and Information Literacy Award in recognition of their work.

In 2022, A Mí No Me La Hacen participated in the sixth Alfamed Congress in Arequipa, an international event gathering Media and Information Literacy experts from Latin America. In the same year, they earned a distinction for their advocacy for Media and Information Literacy from the Peruvian NGO “Democracia Digital”. Since the initiation of the first symposium in 2020, AMNMLH has consistently focused on providing free access and promoting media and information literacy (MIL) for all those interested. To accomplish this goal, they have strategically employed their social media channels and, more recently, their YouTube platform to stream these events live, thus ensuring widespread access.

Throughout the years, AMNMLH has forged alliances with various local and international entities, including but not limited to the UNESCO Office in Peru, Consejo Consultivo de Radio y Televisión (CONCORTV), the Embassy of Finland, Pontificia Universidad Católica del Perú, Goethe-Institut, Agence Française de Développement (AFD), and several others. These strategic partnerships have been instrumental in furthering the organization's mission and amplifying its reach and impact within the field of media and information literacy.

In 2023 A Mí No Me La Hacen announced their PC videogame 'Infodemic: Journalism in crisis'.
