= Fiodorow =

Fiodorow is a Polish-language rendering of the Russian surnamr Fyodorov. Notable people with the surname include:

- Alicja Fiodorow, birth name of Alicja Jeromin (born 1985), Polish Paralympic athlete
- Joanna Fiodorow (born 1989), Polish hammer thrower
