= Alexander Viktorovich Fedorov =

Russian media scholar (born 1954)

- Born: November 4, 1954 (age 71); Yelizovo, Russia
- Education: VGIK - All-Russian State University of Cinematography, Moscow, Russian Academy of Education, Moscow
- Occupations: Media educator, theorist, writer, lecturer, and film critic
- Writing career
- Period: 1978–present
- Genre: Non-fiction
- Subjects: Media education, media literacy, media culture, media studies, media theories, film history
- Notable works: On Media Education (Moscow, 2008
- Notable awards: Prize for outstanding contribution to the development of media education Russia, 2007. Prize for Best Media Education Book Russia, 2009. Global Media and Information Literacy Award 2019.
- Website: mediaeducation.ucoz.ru/load/media_education_literacy_in_russia/8

Alexander Viktorovich Fedorov (Russian: Александр Викторович Фёдоров; born November 4, 1954) is a Russian scientist, teacher, media education specialist, film critic. He completed his Ph.D. dissertation about media education (1993) at the Russian Academy of Education (Moscow).

== Biography ==
He was the president of the Russian Association for Film and Media Education (2003–2014) and deputy director of the Anton Chekhov Taganrog Institute (Russia) (2005–2018) and main editor of journal "Media Education" (‘Mediaobrazovanie’). He is also a member of the Russian Academy of Film Arts and Science, Russian Union of Filmmakers, CIFEJ and FIPRESCI. Alexander Fedorov is the author of 20 books on media education and media literacy and more than 400 articles (in Russian, English, Canadian, French, German, and Norwegian media studies and media literacy journals).

Since 1997 he has received scientific research grants on media culture and media education from the President of the Russian Federation, Russian Foundation for Humanities, Russian Ministry of Education, Kennan Institute (US), IREX (US), MacArthure Foundation (US), DAAD (Germany), and others. He was a guest professor and research fellow in Norway Association for Media Education, Oslo (1995), Central European University (Budapest, 1998, 2006), Kassel University (2000), Maison des sciences de l'homme, Paris (2002, 2009), Kennan Institute, Washington D.C. (2003), Humboldt University, Berlin (2005), University of Mainz (2010), Johann Wolfgang Goethe Universität Frankfurt am Main (2014).

On September 24, 2019, Alexander Fedorov was awarded the Global Media and Information Literacy Award 2019. This award is presented annually, with the participation of UNESCO, for outstanding achievements and leadership in the field of information and media, media culture - to researchers, educators, artists, activists, associations and other groups that innovative integrate media and information literacy into their work and related activities.

== Books ==
- Fedorov, Alexander (2009). Media Education: Yesterday and Today. Moscow: ICOS UNESCO ‘Information for All’, 232 p.
- Fedorov, Alexander (2008). On Media Education. Moscow.
- Fedorov, Alexander (2007). Development of the Media Competence and Critical Thinking of Pedagogical University’s Students. Moscow, 616 p.
- Fedorov, Alexander (2007). Media Education: Sociology Surveys. Taganrog: Kuchma Publishing House, 228 p.
- Fedorov, Alexander and all. (2007). Aesthetical Conception in Russian Media Education and Scientific Heritage of Y.Usov. Taganrog: Kuchma Publishing House, 183 p.
- Fedorov, Alexander and all. (2007). Media Education in the US, Canada and UK. Taganrog: Kuchma Publishing House, 256 p.
- Fedorov, Alexander and all. (2007). Problems of Media Education. Taganrog: Taganrog State Pedagogical Institute, 212 p.
- Fedorov, Alexander (2005). Media Education of Future Teachers. Taganrog: Kuchma Publishing House, 314 p.
- Fedorov Alexander, and all. (2005). Media Education. Media Pedagogic. Media Journalism. Moscow: UNESCO Program ‘Information for All’. CD. 1400 p.
- Fedorov, Alexander and Novikova, Anastasia (2005). Media Education in the Leading Western Countries. Taganrog: Kuchma Publishing House, 270 p.
- Fedorov, Alexander and all. (2004). Media Literacy for Future Teachers and Modernization of Educational Process in Russia. Taganrog: Kuchma Publishing House, 188 p.
- Fedorov, Alexander (2004). Children's Rights and the Problem of Violence on the Russian Screen. Taganrog: Kuchma Publishing House, 414 p.
- Fedorov, Alexander (2004). Media Education and Media Literacy. Taganrog: Kuchma Publishing House, 340 p.
- Fedorov, Alexander (2003). Media Education in Pedagogical Universities. Taganrog: Kuchma Publishing House, 124 p.
- Fedorov, Alexander (2003). Media Education in the Western World. Taganrog: Kuchma Publishing House, 238 p.
- Fedorov, Alexander and Chelysheva Irina (2002). Media Education in Russia: Short History of Development. Taganrog: Poznanie, 265 p.
- Fedorov, Alexander (2001). Media Education: History, Theory and Methods. Rostov: CVVR. 708 p.
- Fedorov, Alexander. Media Education: Sociology Surveys. Taganrog, 2007.
- Fedorov, Alexander. Violence on the Russian and American Media Screen and Youth Audience. Taganrog, 2003.
- Fedorov, Alexander. On Media Education. Moscow, 2008.
- Fedorov, Alexander. Film studies in the university students’ audience: from entertainment genres to art house. Moscow, 2014.
- Fedorov, Alexander. Media literacy education. Moscow, 2015.
- Fedorov, Alexander. Russia in the Mirror of the Western Screen. Moscow: ICO “Information for All”, 2015. 117 p.
- Fedorov, Alexander. Western World in the Soviet and Russian Screen: From Epoch of Ideological Confrontation (1946-1991) to Modern Time (1992-2016). Moscow, 2016
- Fedorov, A. Record holders of the banned Soviet cinema (1951-1991) in the mirror of film criticism and viewers' opinions. Moscow: “Information for all”. 2021. 102 p.
