= Champagne Nicolas Feuillatte =

Union of champagne producers

Coordinates: 49.0241407°N 3.9751413°E

The Centre Vinicole – Champagne Nicolas Feuillatte (CV-CNF) is the oldest union of producers of champagne. It comprises 82 winemaking cooperatives representing more than 5000 vineyards, situated on a hill in the commune of Chouilly, on the road leading to Pierry, and overlooks the community of Épernay.

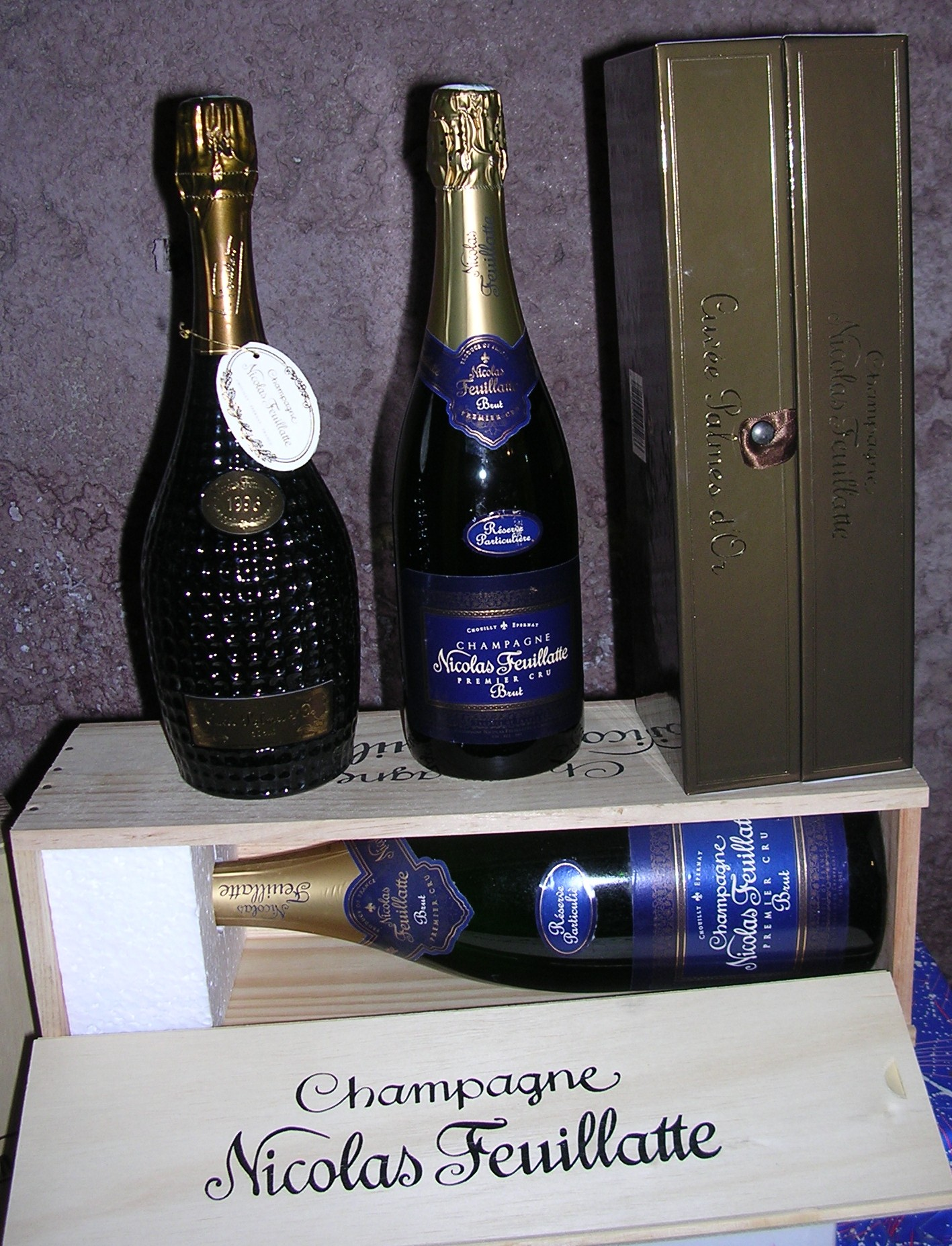
Bottles of Nicolas Feuillatte

== History ==
Henri Macquart founded the Centre Vinicole de la Champagne in 1972 as a storage and vinification unit to serve winegrowers, federated around cooperative or individual wine presses, and it got its present name in 1986.

Nicolas Feuillatte established his brand in 1976, after inheriting a vineyard near Reims, the Domaine de Bouleuse. In 1986 it was purchased by the Centre Vinicole de la Champagne. Centre Vinicole produces about 24 million bottles of champagne a year.

In 2017, Nicolas Feuillatte named Four Seasons employee, Craig M. Joseph, as their new chief Operating Officer.

In December 2021, CV-CNF announced that it would be merging with Coopérative Régionale des Vins de Champagne (CRVC).

== Source of supply ==
- 2,162 hectares (5,340 acres), out of the 31,500 hectares (78,000 acres) in production in the region, is used by Nicolas Feuillatte, corresponding to nearly 7% of the Champagne vineyard.
- 82 cooperatives out of the 140 in Champagne bringing together 4,500 winegrowers (56% of the supply).
- Union of Individual Producers: 1,000 individual wine-growers (44% of the supply).

== See also ==
- List of Champagne houses
