= Aleksey Fyodorov =

Aleksey Fyodorov may refer to:

- Aleksey Fyodorov (triple jumper) (born 1991), Russian triple jumper
- Alexei Fedorov (born 1972), Belarus chess grandmaster
- Oleksiy Fedorov (1901–1989), Soviet resistance fighter in German-occupied Ukraine
