= Sergei Fyodorov =

Sergei Fyodorov, Sergey Fedorov, Serhiy Fedorov or their combinations may refer to:

- Sergei Fyodorov (surgeon) (1869–1936), Russian surgeon-urologist
- Sergei Fyodorov (painter) (born 1959), Russian icon painter
- Sergei Fedorov (born 1969), Russian ice hockey player
- Serhiy Fedorov (born 1975), Ukrainian football player
