= Journal of Media Literacy Education =

- Discipline: Education
- Language: English
- Edited by: Maria Ranieri, Julian McDougall, Lucas Jacob

Publication details
- History: 2007–present
- Publisher: BePress on behalf of the National Association for Media Literacy Education (United States of America)
- Open access: open access

Standard abbreviations
- ISO 4: J. Media Lit. Educ.

Indexing
- ISSN: 2167-8715
- LCCN: 2012203108
- OCLC no.: 984778216

Links
- Journal homepage

The Journal of Media Literacy Education is a quarterly open-access, peer-reviewed academic journal that is published by Digital Commons at the University of Rhode Island on behalf of the National Association for Media Literacy Education, a non-profit national membership organization for media literacy education in the United States. In 2022, the co-editors are Maria Ranieri (University of Florence, Italy), Julian McDougall (Bournemouth University), and Lucas Jacob (LaJolla Country Day School). Previous JMLE editors have been recognized by the organization for their leadership and service.

== History ==
The journal was established in 2009 by founding co-editors Renee Hobbs (University of Rhode Island) and Amy Petersen Jensen (Brigham Young University)

=== Editors ===
The following persons have been co-editors:

- 2009–2019: Renee Hobbs, University of Rhode Island, Founding Editor
- 2009–2012: Amy Petersen Jensen, Brigham Young University, Founding Editor
- 2013–2016: Vanessa Greenwood Domine, Montclair State University
- 2017–2019: Paul Mihailidis, Emerson College
- 2015–2019: Theresa Redmond, Appalachian State University
- 2020–present: Maria Ranieri, University of Florence
- 2022–present: Julian McDougall, Bournemouth University
- 2022–present: Lucas Jacob, LaJolla Country Day School
- 2022–present: Helen Liu, York University

== Abstracting and indexing ==
The journal is abstracted and indexed in:

- World Cat

== See also ==
- List of education journals
