= Ivan Fyodorov (pilot) =

Ivan Vadilyevich Fyodorov was a pilot during World War II

- Native name: Иван Васильевич Фёдоров
- Born: 21 September 1920; Dubye village, Tver Governorate, RSFSR
- Died: 28 August 2000 (aged 79) Cherkasy, Ukraine
- Allegiance: Soviet Union
- Branch: Soviet Air Force
- Service years: 1940—1978
- Rank: General-major of Aviation
- Conflicts: World War II
- Awards: Hero of the Soviet Union

Ivan Vasilyevich Fyodorov (Russian: Иван Васильевич Фёдоров; 21 September 1920 — 28 August 2000) was one of the top Soviet fighter pilots during World War II, credited with around 37 solo shootdowns.
