= Nikolay Fedorov (painter) =

Soviet painter and textile designer

Nikolay Ivanovich Fedorov (Russian: Николай Иванович Фёдоров, 1918-10-13 in Vyatka (now Kirov) to 1990-11-16) was a Soviet painter and textile designer.

Collections of his works were acquired by the Russian Museum in St. Petersburg and by the Museum of Decorative and Applied Arts in Moscow and also are permanently exhibited in the State Darwin Museum in Moscow and in the museums in Tomsk and Krasnoyarsk.

== Honors and exhibitions ==
Member of the USSR's Union of Artists since 1956 and in 1978 awarded with the title of Honored Artist of Russia.

The collection of textile elaborated with his participation won the Grand Prix, Diploma of 1st degree and a gold medal at the World Exhibition in Brussels in 1958. His tapestries have been exhibited various times at the Leipzig Fair. He is one of the authors of curtains for the Bolshoi Theatre in Moscow, curtains for concert hall in the Hotel Russia (along with Kausov), the assembly hall of the Palace of Culture of Moscow's Textile Institute (along with Shubnikova) and author of curtains for Concert Hall at the Palace of Culture of the Ministry of Internal Affairs.

The joint collection of his and Shubnikova's art works represented Russian textile art of 1940's-1950's in the exposition of Russian Museum in St. Petersburg in 1993. This exhibition has made a long tour through several counties in Europe in the 1990s.

== Documenting the search for Tunguska meteorite ==
In 1939, he participated as an artist in the last Leonid Kulik’s expedition for the search of Tunguska "meteorite" (it is still a controversy what exactly caused the event). Later, in 1984 and 1988, he also participated in the Tunguska meteorite expeditions under the guidance of Academician Vasiliev. His paintings describing eyewitness reports and later scientific theories were exhibited in many museums and used in several books.

== Textiles ==
Nikolay's textiles were produced for many years by the Moscow Weaving and Finishing Complex (MTOK) and widely used. Some textile samples were purchased by the Moscow Film Studio (Mosfilm) and utilized in many popular films as curtains at the set. One textile based on French classical tapestry was used in the popular Russian TV series "Twelve Chairs".
