= Yevgeny Fyodorov =

Yevgeny Fyodorov may refer to:

- Yevgeny Fyodorov (politician) (born 1963), Russian politician and deputy of the State Duma
- Yevgeny Fyodorov (scientist) (1910–1981), Soviet geophysicist, statesman, and public figure
- Yevgeny Petrovich Fyodorov, Soviet Air Force general
- Yevgeniy Fedorov (born 2000), Kazakh cyclist
- Yevgeny Fyodorov (ice hockey) (born 1980), Russian ice hockey player
- Evgeny Fedorov, Russian musician in the band Tequilajazzz
