= Andrey Venediktovich Fyodorov =

Russian philologist, translator, teacher

- Born: April 19, 1906; Saint Petersburg, Russian Empire
- Died: November 24, 1997 (aged 91); Saint Petersburg, Russia
- Education: Saint Petersburg Imperial University
- Known for: Theory of literary translation
- Awards: Order of the Red Star, Order of the Patriotic War

Andrey Venediktovich Fyodorov (Russian: Андре́й Венеди́ктович Фёдоров, April 19, 1906 – November 24, 1997) was a Soviet philologist, translator, literary translation theorist, one of the founders of Soviet translation theory, and professor. For 15 years (1963–1979), he was the chairman of the Department of German Philology at Saint Petersburg State University (formerly Leningrad State University).

== Biography ==
Andrey Venediktovich Fyodorov was born on April 19, 1906, in Saint Petersburg. He graduated from the Philological Faculty at the State Institute for the History of Arts in 1929.

He was a student of the following philologists and linguists: Lev Vladimirovich Shcherba, Yury Nikolaevich Tynyanov, Viktor Vladimirovich Vinogradov, Viktor Maksimovich Zhirmunsky, Sergey Ignatyevich Bernshteyn, Boris Alexandrovich Larin.

From 1930 he taught in high school; from 1956 at the Leningrad State University. In 1960 he became a professor, and he was the chairman of the Department of German Philology from 1963 to 1979.

During World War II, Fyodorov was in the army field forces: He worked as a translator, writer of leaflets, and captain of administrative services. He was awarded the Order of the Red Star, the Order of the Patriotic War (Second Class), and the Medal "For the Defence of Leningrad".

His first paper Problemy stikhotvornogo perevoda (Проблемы стихотворного перевода (Problems in Translating Poetry)) was published in 1927. Fyodorov had written the book Iskusstvo perevoda (Искусство перевода (The Art of Translation)) co-authored with Korney Chukovsky. It was published in 1930. He is also the author of ten books and more than 200 publications about translation and interpretation. Furthermore, he translated the works of many famous German (Ernst Theodor Amadeus Hoffmann, Heinrich Heine, Johann Wolfgang von Goethe, Thomas Mann, Heinrich von Kleist) and French (Denis Diderot, Marcel Proust, Guy de Maupassant, Molière, Gustave Flaubert, Alfred de Musset) authors into Russian.

He is the author of well-known paper about the poet Innokentiy Fyodorovich Annensky. Fyodorov struck the perfect balance: He had a fundamental philological knowledge, a sharp feel for linguistics and a writing talent. Three editions of poems of Annensky (in 1939, 1959, and 1990) were printed with the foreword written by Fyodorov in the book series Biblioteka poeta (Библиотека поэта (Library of the Poet)).

Fyodorov also wrote the books about stylistics and linguistics.

Today, the Saint Petersburg Center for Translation Studies at the Department of English Philology and Translation of the Faculty of Philology of Saint Petersburg State University is named in honor of A. V. Fyodorov.

== Publications ==
- (1941) O khudozhestvennom perevode (О художественном переводе (About Literary Translation))
- (1984) Innokentiy Annenskiy. Lichnost i tvorchestvo (Иннокентий Анненский. Личность и творчество (Innokentiy Annensky. Life and Work))
- (1970) Ocherki obshchey i sopostavitelnoy stilistiki (Очерки общей и сопоставительной стилистики (Essays on General and Contrastive Stylistics))
- (1972) Teatr A. Bloka i dramaturgiya ego vremeni (Театр А. Блока и драматургия его времени (Alexander Blok and The Drama of his Time))
- (1980) Aleksandr Blok — dramaturg (Александр Блок — драматург (Alexander Blok is a Dramatist))
- (1967) Lermontov i literatura ego vremeni (Лермонтов и литература его времени (Lermontov and the Literature of His Time))
- (1923–1930) Semantika deklamatsionnoy rechi (Семантика декламационной речи (Semantics of the Declamation))
