= Igor Zubarev =

Russian politician (born 1966)

- Игорь Зубарев
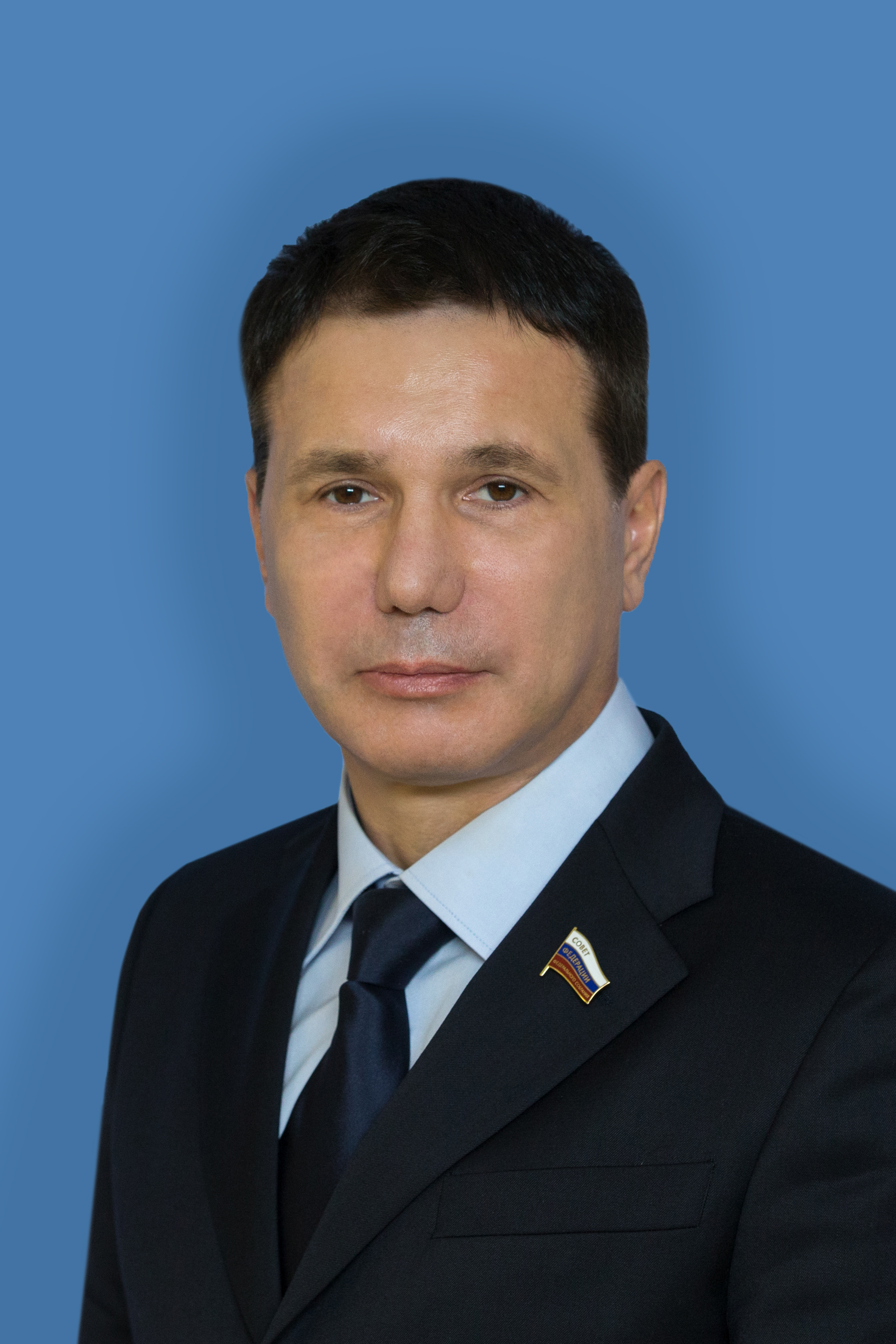

Senator from the Republic of Karelia
- Incumbent
- Assumed office 7 October 2021
- Preceded by: Vladimir Fedorov

Personal details
- Born: Igor Zubarev; 20 July 1966 (age 60) Yantarny, Kaliningrad Oblast, Russian Soviet Federative Socialist Republic, Soviet Union
- Party: United Russia
- Education: Stavropol State Agrarian University

Igor Dmitrievich Zubarev (Russian: Игорь Дмитриевич Зубарев; born 20 July 1966) is a Russian politician serving as a senator from the Republic of Karelia since 7 October 2021.

== Biography ==
Zubarev was born on 20 July 1966 in Yantarny, Kaliningrad Oblast. In 1984–1985, he studied at the Petrozavodsk State University. From 1985 to 1987, he served in the Soviet Armed Forces. From 1993, he was engaged in a commercial enterprise in the Republic of Karelia.

In July 2003, he became chairman of the newly registered “Union of Fisheries Enterprises of Karelia”, a non-profit association uniting 15 leading fishing enterprises in the republic, a position he held until 2016.

Through his leadership and collaboration with the Federal Agency for Fisheries, he guided all Karelian enterprises through a successful application campaign in 2008. They secured 10-year fishing quotas by resolving more than 30 issues in their applications, completing the process without a single quota loss.

From 2003 to 2016, he was the deputy of the Legislative Assembly of the Republic of Karelia of the 3rd, 4th, and 5th convocations.

He earned a bachelor's degree in Public and Municipal Administration from the Russian Presidential Academy of National Economy and Public Administration (RANEPA) in 2016. On 7 October 2016, he became the Senator from the Legislative Assembly of the Republic of Karelia. In 2021, he was re-appointed.

He joined the Committee for Agrarian and Food Policy and Environmental Management in the Federation Council, a position in which he was appointed deputy chairman in October 2024.

In March 2022, he sold the Virma Fishery Company to Igor Chevychalo and withdrew from the fishing industry. Concurrently, he ceased to be a founder of other fishing sector entities in Karelia, namely "Soglasie" LLC, "Pelagika" LLC, and "Azimut" LLC.

Zubarev is under personal sanctions introduced by the European Union, the United Kingdom, the USA, Canada, Switzerland, Australia, Ukraine, New Zealand, for ratifying the decisions of the "Treaty of Friendship, Cooperation and Mutual Assistance between the Russian Federation and the Donetsk People's Republic and between the Russian Federation and the Luhansk People's Republic" and providing political and economic support for Russia's annexation of Ukrainian territories.
