= Vladimir Fedorov (politician) =

Russian politician (born 1946)

- Владимир Фёдоров
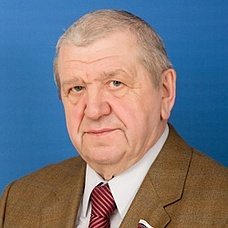

Senator from the Republic of Karelia
- In office January 2003 – October 2016
- Preceded by: Yury Ponomaryov
- Succeeded by: Igor Zubarev

Personal details
- Born: Vladimir Fedorov; 10 September 1946 (age 80) Petrozavodsk, Karelo-Finnish Soviet Socialist Republic, Soviet Union
- Party: United Russia
- Education: Saint Petersburg State University of Architecture and Civil Engineering

Vladimir Aleksandrovich Fedorov (Russian: Владимир Александрович Фёдоров; born 10 September 1946) is a Russian politician who served as a senator from the Republic of Karelia from 2003 to 2016.

== Career ==
Vladimir Fedorov was born on 10 September 1946 in Petrozavodsk, Karelo-Finnish Soviet Socialist Republic. He graduated from the Saint Petersburg State University of Architecture and Civil Engineering. From 1998 to 2001, he worked as a head of the Main Directorate for Traffic Safety. On 4 January 2003, he became the senator the Republic of Karelia. He remained in this position until October 2016.
