= Renee Hobbs =

American scholar and educator

Renee Hobbs is an American scholar, educator, and researcher who works in the field of media literacy education. She is Professor of Communication Studies at the Harrington School of Communication and Media, University of Rhode Island and founder of the Media Education Lab. Her work focuses on helping students and educators develop the skills that are necessary in understanding media literacy education. Some of her projects include the National Association for Media Literacy Education and Mind Over Media: Analyzing Contemporary Propaganda.

== Academic career ==
Hobbs holds a BA in English Literature and Film/Video Studies and an MA in Communication from the University of Michigan and an EdD from the Harvard Graduate School of Education. Her doctoral research examined how the relationship between images and narration in television news affects viewer comprehension and recall Hobbs spent 18 years teaching media studies at Babson College in Wellesley, Massachusetts, where she developed the Felton Scholars Program in collaboration with Elizabeth Thoman of the Center for Media Literacy in Los Angeles. The Felton Scholars Program encourages students to critically examine the media that they encounter. Hobbs collaborated with the Maryland State Department of Education and Discovery Communication to create Assignment: Media Literacy, a comprehensive K-12 media literacy curriculum created in 1998. Hobbs’ collaborations reflect her involvement in expanding media literacy education beyond traditional learning.

Appointed to a professorship at Temple University's School of Communication and Theater in 2003, Hobbs established the Media Education Lab. In 2007, Hobbs became founding co-editor of the Journal of Media Literacy Education, a publication of the National Association for Media Literacy Education. In January 2012, she was appointed the Founding Director of the Harrington School of Communication and Media at the University of Rhode Island, a position she held until 2014, where she became the Co-Director of the URI Graduate Certificate in Digital Literacy program. She served as Digital Literacy Fellow for the American Library Association Office of Information Technology Policy (OITP) in 2012 and has developed professional development programs in digital literacy for educators. She teaches graduate and undergraduate courses in media literacy, digital authorship, children and media, media education and contemporary propaganda to students in Education, English, Communication Studies and Library and Information Studies.

== Major contributions and research ==
Hobbs has an interest in how teachers acquire digital and media literacy competencies. She specializes in initiating field-based school programs in elementary and secondary schools that include a rigorous academic research component. She helped to build the field of media literacy education by co-founding the Partnership for Media Education in 1997. That was renamed as the Alliance for a Media Literate America in the year 2000. in 2008 it was further renamed as the National Association for Media Literacy Education. They claimed over 8,900 members in February 2026. Hobbs also contributed to the academic work of this organization by working as a founding co-editor of the Journal of Media Literacy Education, which is an open access publication that provides a platform for research in the field of media literacy. In examining the history of media literacy education in the United States, Hobbs has explored the origins of propaganda education in the 1930s and examined the influence of educational leaders including Jerome Bruner and other leading scholars of the 20th century. She has received grant funding for her research, community service and creative professional work from organizations including the John D. and Catherine T. MacArthur Foundation, the Haas Trusts, and the Verizon Foundation.

=== Media literacy policy ===
Hobbs authored a white paper, Digital and Media Literacy: A Plan of Action which was co-published by the Aspen Institute and the Knight Commission on the Information Needs of Communities in a Democracy. Hobbs argues that media literacy education can occur in both formal and informal settings. Hobbs believes that the media industry has an important role to play in advancing media literacy. She collaborated with Discovery Communications, Inc to create Assignment: Media Literacy, a comprehensive media literacy curriculum for kindergarten through twelfth grade students. In 1998, she published "The Seven Great Debates in the Media Literacy Movement" in the Journal of Communication which identified some tensions within the community about the relative value of protecting children from media risks and harms, the role of media production as a creative learning strategy, and questions of whether media literacy education should be funded by media corporations.

=== Copyright for media literacy education ===
Hobbs conducted research that identified how media literacy educators' misunderstanding and ignorance of copyright law as it applies to media literacy education has limited the scope of innovation in K-12 and higher education. With colleagues Patricia Aufderheide and Peter Jaszi, she developed the Code of Best Practices in Fair Use in Media Literacy Education, which identifies normative practices regarding the use of copyrighted content for media literacy education. Hobbs has also sought and received exemptions from the U.S. Copyright Office regarding the Digital Millennium Copyright Act (DMCA) in permitting the legal “ripping” of DVDs by K-12 educators.

=== Measuring the impact of media literacy education ===
Renee Hobbs has conducted research to measure the impact of media literacy education on academic achievement. In 2003, she published the results of a quasi-experimental naturalistic field research comparing two New Hampshire public high schools, one of which had integrated Media/Communication into the year-long Grade 11 English class. Results showed that, compared to a matched control group, students receiving media literacy education improved the ability to critically analyze both advertising and news in print, video and audio formats. In another study, Hobbs found that students enrolled in a news media production program increased their intellectual curiosity, comfort in collaborating with peers and intent to be civically engaged. In another study of high school students, Hobbs found a relationship between media literacy competencies and civic engagement. Hobbs has also studied how media literacy education helps young immigrants develop English language skills and how young children can benefit from media literacy pedagogy that engages children in learning about the peoples and cultures of the Middle East Hobbs has also investigated the development of younger students' media literacy competencies by identifying "active reasoning" skills that may be precursor competencies to media literacy

=== Multimedia for media literacy education ===
Renee Hobbs developed Mind Over Media: Analyzing Contemporary Propaganda, a user-generated content website for teaching and learning about propaganda. This website was developed in 2015 through a collaboration with the United States Holocaust Memorial Museum, and it encourages users to examine how messages in the media are created and the influences they can have on the behaviors and beliefs of the general public. Hobbs also developed Powerful Voices for Kids, a university-school partnership that demonstrates the application of media literacy in urban elementary education. For this project, she developed the Digital Learning Horoscope, an interactive quiz to help educators reflect on their motivations for including digital texts, tools and technologies into the curriculum. In 1996, she created "KNOW TV" for the Discovery Channel. In 1994, she produced a television documentary, "Tuning in to media: Literacy for the information age."

== Books ==
- Odell, L., Vacca, R., Hobbs, R., Irvin, J., & Warriner, J. (2000). Elements of Language. Language arts textbook series for Grades 6 –12. Austin TX: Holt Rinehart, Winston. [Seven textbooks in the series].
- Hobbs, R. (2007). Reading the Media: Media Literacy in High School English. New York: Teachers College Press.
- Hobbs, R. (2010). Copyright Clarity: How Fair Use Supports Digital Learning. Beverly Hills: Corwin/Sage.
- Hobbs, R. (2011). Digital and Media Literacy: Connecting Culture and Classroom. Beverly Hills: Corwin/Sage
- Hobbs, R. & Moore, D.C. (2013). Discovering Media Literacy: Digital Media and Popular Culture in Elementary School. Thousand Oaks CA: Corwin/Sage.
- Hobbs, R. & Moore, D.C. (2013). Discovering Media Literacy: Digital Media and Popular Culture in Elementary School. Thousand Oaks CA: Corwin/Sage.
- Hobbs, R. (2016). Exploring the Roots of Digital and Media Literacy through Personal Narrative Philadelphia: Temple University Press.
- Hobbs, R. (2017). Create to Learn: Introduction to Digital Literacy. New York: Wiley.
- Hobbs, R. (2017). Create to Learn: Introduction to Digital Literacy. New York: Wiley.
- Hobbs, R., Deslauriers, L., & Steager, P.(2018). The Library Screen Scene. New York: Oxford University Press.
- Hobbs, R. & Mihailidis, P.(2019). The International Encyclopedia of Media Literacy. New York: Wiley.
- Hobbs, R. (2020). Mind Over Media: Propaganda Education for a Digital Age. New York: W.W. Norton.
- Hobbs, R. (2021). Media Literacy in Action. New York: Rowman and Littlefield.
