= Evgraf Fedorov Jr. =

Russian climatologist

Yevgraf Yevgrafovich Fyodorov
- Born: 20 November 1880; Saint Petersburg
- Died: 19 July 1965 (aged 84); Moscow
- Education: Saint Petersburg State University

Yevgraf Yevgrafovich Fyodorov (Russian: Евграф Евграфович Фёдоров; 20 November [O.S. 8 November] 1880 in Saint Petersburg – 19 July 1965 in Moscow), was a climatologist. He was a son of Russian mathematician Yevgraf Fyodorov.

Graduation from the University of Saint Petersburg 1910. Researcher in the Magneto-Meteorological Observatory, Pavlovsk 1911–1934, professor of geography with the USSR Academy of Sciences 1934–1951. Corresponding Member of the USSR Academy of Sciences from 1946.

Fyodorov's main contribution consisted in detailed development in descriptive climatology, with a method to describe local climates in terms of daily weather observations.

== Bibliography ==
- Climate as an aggregate of weather. Journal of Meteorology, #7 (1925).
- Distribution and type of precipitation in the plains of the European part of the USSR in the summer. Works of the USSR Academy of Sciences Institute of Geography, #28 (1938).
- with A. I. Baranov: Climate and Weather of the European Part of the USSR. (1949).

== Biography ==
Ya. I. Feldman: Yevgraf Yevgrafovich Fedorov. Izvest. Akad. Nauk S.S.S.R., Ser. Geogr., #1 (1956).
