= Belgorod constituency =

Legislative constituency in Belgorod Oblast, Russia

Belgorod single-member constituency
- Constituency of the Russian State Duma

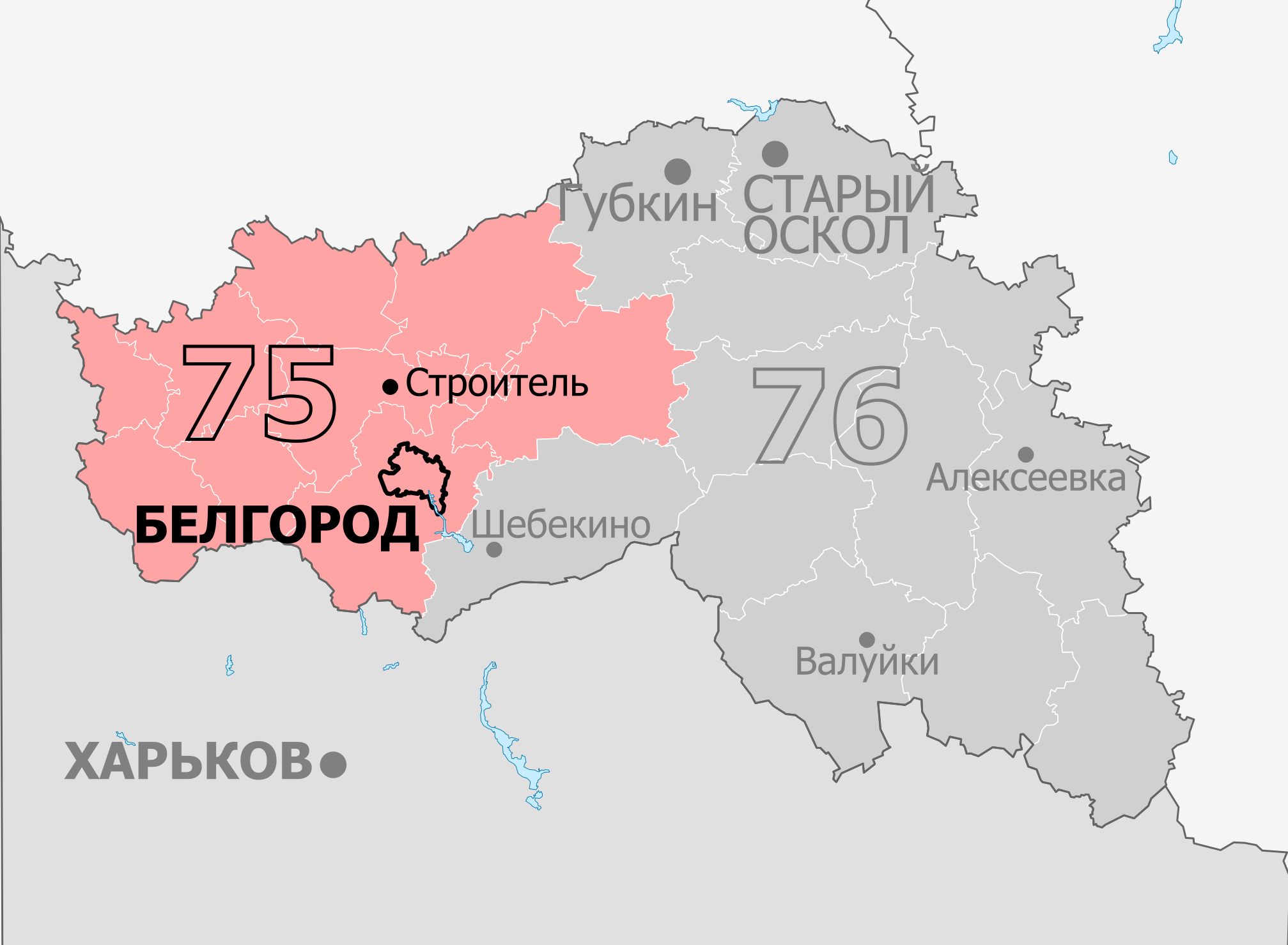
- Constituency boundaries since 2016
- Deputy: Nikita Rumyantsev; United Russia
- Federal subject: Belgorod Oblast
- Districts: Belgorod, Belgorodsky, Borisovsky, Grayvoronsky, Ivnyansky, Korochansky, Krasnoyaruzhsky, Prokhorovsky, Rakityansky, Yakovlevsky
- Voters: 600,733 (2026)

The Belgorod constituency (No.79 (Note: No.63 in 1993-1995, No.62 in 1995-2003, No.64 in 2003-2007, No.75 in 2016–2026)) is a Russian legislative constituency in Belgorod Oblast. The constituency covers western Belgorod Oblast, including its capital — Belgorod.

The constituency has been represented since 2026 by United Russia deputy Nikita Rumyantsev, two-term State Duma member and former Duma staffer, who won the open seat after defeating three-term United Russia incumbent Valery Skrug in the primary.

== Boundaries ==
1993–2007: Belgorod, Belgorodsky District, Borisovsky District, Grayvoronsky District, Ivnyansky District, Korochansky District, Krasnoyaruzhsky District, Prokhorovsky District, Rakityansky District, Shebekino, Shebekinsky District, Yakovlevsky District
The constituency covered western Belgorod Oblast, including the oblast capital of Belgorod and the city of Shebekino.

2016–present: Belgorod, Belgorodsky District, Borisovsky District, Grayvoronsky District, Ivnyansky District, Korochansky District, Krasnoyaruzhsky District, Prokhorovsky District, Rakityansky District, Yakovlevsky District
The constituency was re-created for the 2016 election and it retained most of its territory, losing only Shebekino and Shebekinsky District to Stary Oskol constituency.

== Members elected ==
Election	Member	Party
1993	Viktor Berestovoy	Independent
1995	Nikolay Ryzhkov (Note: appointed to the Federation Council in September 2003)	Power to the People
1999	Nikolay Ryzhkov	Independent
2003	Georgy Golikov	Independent
2007	Proportional representation - no election by constituency	
2011	Proportional representation - no election by constituency	
2016	Sergey Bozhenov	United Russia
2021	Valery Skrug	United Russia
2026	Nikita Rumyantsev	United Russia

== Election results ==
=== 1993 ===
Summary of the 12 December 1993 Russian legislative election in the Belgorod constituency
Candidate	Party	Votes	%
Viktor Berestovoy	Independent	150,535	42.46%
Igor Ivanov	Choice of Russia	52,859	14.91%
Sergey Sychyov	Liberal Democratic Party	28,059	7.91%
Aleksandr Goncharov	Independent	20,406	5.76%
Vasily Kravchenko	Agrarian Party	15,350	4.33%
Arkady Barsukov	Independent	14,897	4.20%
Feliks Kondratov	Yavlinsky–Boldyrev–Lukin	5,081	1.43%
against all		42,431	11.97%
Total		354,564	100%

=== 1995 ===
Summary of the 17 December 1995 Russian legislative election in the Belgorod constituency
Candidate	Party	Votes	%
Nikolay Ryzhkov	Power to the People	209,598	50.94%
Ivan Miroshnichenko	Our Home – Russia	30,927	7.52%
Yury Gabelkov	Liberal Democratic Party	24,134	5.87%
Vasily Bessmertny	Independent	20,855	5.07%
Gennady Bukhalin	Congress of Russian Communities	19,176	4.66%
Viktor Kornev	Pamfilova–Gurov–Lysenko	14,489	3.52%
Vladimir Abelmazov	Forward, Russia!	11,418	2.77%
Vladimir Vetkov	Derzhava	11,124	2.70%
Aleksandr Belyakov	Party of Russian Unity and Accord	6,983	1.70%
against all		54,339	13.21%
Total		411,465	100%

=== 1999 ===
Summary of the 19 December 1999 Russian legislative election in the Belgorod constituency
Candidate	Party	Votes	%
Nikolay Ryzhkov (incumbent)	Independent	198,949	51.66%
Olga Kitova	Independent	48,651	12.63%
Yevgeny Gasho	Yabloko	40,451	10.50%
Aleksandr Goncharov	Independent	33,663	8.74%
Valery Varganov	Our Home – Russia	13,440	3.49%
against all		39,324	10.21%
Total		385,083	100%

=== 2003 ===
Summary of the 7 December 2003 Russian legislative election in the Belgorod constituency
Candidate	Party	Votes	%
Georgy Golikov	Independent	261,016	65.54%
Vasily Altukhov	Communist Party	71,583	17.97%
Aleksandr Lityuk	Liberal Democratic Party	8,718	2.19%
Yevgeny Zaytsev	United Russian Party Rus'	6,723	1.69%
Boris Belogurov	Independent	4,959	1.25%
against all		38,057	9.56%
Total		398,406	100%

=== 2016 ===
Summary of the 18 September 2016 Russian legislative election in the Belgorod constituency
Candidate	Party	Votes	%
Sergey Bozhenov	United Russia	188,964	52.87%
Yury Selivanov	A Just Russia	43,892	12.28%
Valery Shevlyakov	Communist Party	34,882	9.76%
Aleksandr Starovoytov	Liberal Democratic Party	34,286	9.59%
Ruslan Khoroshilov	Communists of Russia	18,002	5.04%
Natalia Chernyshova	Civic Platform	10,659	2.98%
Vera Porkhun	The Greens	8,373	2.34%
Andrey Svishchyov	Rodina	8,008	2.24%
Total		357,427	100%

=== 2021 ===
Summary of the 17-19 September 2021 Russian legislative election in the Belgorod constituency
Candidate	Party	Votes	%
Valery Skrug	United Russia	166,464	47.61%
Stanislav Panov	Communist Party	54,303	15.53%
Yury Osetrov	A Just Russia — For Truth	28,704	8.21%
Kristina Larina	New People	27,390	7.83%
Vladimir Androsov	Party of Pensioners	25,393	7.26%
Sergey Barinov	Liberal Democratic Party	19,325	5.53%
Yevgeny Bilichenko	The Greens	9,838	2.81%
Sergey Yeskov	Rodina	6,419	1.84%
Total		349,666	100%

=== 2026 ===
Summary of the 18-20 September 2026 Russian legislative election in the Belgorod constituency
Candidate	Party	Votes	%
Nikita Rumyantsev	United Russia	193,892	51.19%
Irina Gukova	Communist Party	54,296	14.34%
Yevgeny Dremov	Liberal Democratic Party	42,198	11.14%
Vladimir Abelmazov	A Just Russia	33,002	8.71%
Aleksandr Kharybin	New People	29,343	7.75%
Ilya Kostyukov	Yabloko	18,638	4.92%
Total		378,748	100%
