= Anton Ivanov (politician) =

Turkmen-Russian politician

- Антон Иванов

7th Head of Belgorod
- In office 21 December 2021 – 31 October 2022
- Preceded by: Yury Galdun
- Succeeded by: Valentin Demidov

Personal details
- Born: Anton Aleksandrovich Ivanov; 2 February 1985 (age 41) Mary, Turkmen Soviet Socialist Republic, Soviet Union
- Party: Independent

Anton Aleksandrovich Ivanov (Russian: Антон Александрович Иванов; born 2 February 1985), is a Turkmen–Russian politician who was the Head of Belgorod from 21 December 2021 to 31 October 2022.

== Biography ==
Anton Ivanov was born on 2 February 1985 in Mary, Turkmen Soviet Socialist Republic, in the Soviet Union. In 2007, he graduated from the Law Institute of Belgorod State University, in 2008 - the Institute of Economics and Management of Belgorod Technological University.

From 2014 to 2016, he worked in the administration of Belgorodsky District as deputy head of the construction, transport, housing and communal services and engineering infrastructure committee, and in 2017 he became the first deputy head of the construction and transport department of Belgorod Oblast. From 2018 to 2021, he was the General Director of JSC "Belgorod Mortgage Corporation" and the State Unitary Enterprise "Fund for Support of IZHS of the Belgorod Oblast".

On 11 October 2021, Ivanov headed the office of the administration of Belgorod, and on 13 October, he was appointed the First Deputy Mayor of Belgorod. On 21 December 2021, Ivanov was elected by the deputies of the Belgorod City Council as the 7th head of the administration of Belgorod.

On 7 November 2022, he left the position due to the transfer to another job.

On 8 March 2023, Ivanov was arrested by the Sverdlovsky District Court of Belgorod for two months on charges of taking a large bribe.
