= 2023 Belgorod accidental bombing =

Friendly fire incident during the Russian invasion of Ukraine

- Part of the Russian invasion of Ukraine
- CCTV footage of the explosion
- Type: Accidental friendly fire incident
- Location: Intersection of Vatutina Avenue and Gubkina Street, Belgorod, Belgorod Oblast, Russia; 50.5682°N 36.5847°E
- Date: 20 April 2023; 22:15 (MSK, UTC+3)
- Casualties: 3 civilians injured

On the evening of 20 April 2023, a Russian Su-34 strike fighter accidentally dropped a bomb on the Russian city of Belgorod near the border with Ukraine. The Russian authorities acknowledged the fact of the bombing, declaring the destruction in the city and the injury of three people.

== Background ==
Bordering Ukraine, the Belgorod Oblast and its administrative center Belgorod have been subject to several shellings since the beginning of the Russian invasion of Ukraine in February 2022. Russian military jets regularly fly over Belgorod on their way to Ukraine.

The authorities of the Russian regions bordering Ukraine – Belgorod, Bryansk and Kursk Oblasts – regularly report shelling, as a result of which there is destruction and casualties. Regional authorities claim that the attacks are carried out from the Ukrainian side. The Ukrainian authorities have not responded to these claims.

== Incident ==
A video from a surveillance camera has appeared on Russian Telegram channels, which allegedly shows the moment of the explosion in Belgorod. In black and white footage, a whistle-like sound is heard first, followed by silence. The bomb landed at an intersection of two roads not far from the city centre and next to residential buildings. A few seconds later there is a loud explosion. According to assumptions, the explosive device was first buried in the ground and only then exploded.

According to Ministry of Defence, "At around 22:15 Moscow time on 20 April, when a Su-34 plane of the Russian Aerospace Forces was performing a flight above the city of Belgorod, an emergency release of an air ordnance occurred." The MoD statement did not say what kind of bomb fell on the city.

The Governor of the Belgorod Oblast Vyacheslav Gladkov said earlier in Telegram that an explosion occurred in the city center, a crater with a diameter of 20 meters formed, several cars and buildings were damaged.

== Damage and injuries ==
The bomb explosion created a large crater with a diameter of 40 meters (130 feet). Photos and videos posted online show piles of concrete on the street, several damaged cars and buildings. One image shows a car on top of a Pyaterochka supermarket.

The next day, Vyacheslav Gladkov reported three people wounded in the explosion of a dropped bomb, though their injuries were not life-threatening. Gladkov said "Thank God, there are no dead" in a Telegram statement, adding that the apartment building was evacuated at night.

Belgorod Mayor Valentin Demidov said several apartments were damaged in the explosion, and their residents temporarily placed in hotels.

Afterwards, another explosive was found in the same neighbourhood, prompting the evacuation of 3,000 residents from 17 apartment buildings until it was removed and detonated.

== See also ==
- "To bomb Voronezh" – Russian internet meme referring to Russian government responses to foreign sanctions that harm the citizens of Russia itself.
- List of friendly fire incidents
- 2022 Yeysk military aircraft crash
- 30 December 2023 Belgorod shelling
- Bombing of Freiburg on 10 May 1940, an accidental bombing of a German city by the Luftwaffe during the Battle of France
