= Georgy Golikov =

Russian politician

- Георгий Голиков

Member of the State Duma
- In office 7 December 2003 – 2011

Member of the Federation Council from the legislative authority of Belgorod Oblast
- In office 3 December 2001 – 7 December 2003
- Succeeded by: Sergey Popelnyukhov

2nd Head of Belgorod
- In office 1994 – 3 December 2001
- Preceded by: Yury Selivyorstov
- Succeeded by: Vasily Potryasayev

Personal details
- Born: Georgy Georgyevich Golikov; 10 April 1950 (age 74); Belgorod, Soviet Union

Georgy Georgyevich Golikov (Russian: Георгий Георгиевич Голиков; born on 10 April 1950), is a Russian politician who had served as a member of the State Duma from 2003 to 2011.

He also served as a member of the Federation Council from the legislative authority of Belgorod Oblast from 2001 to 2003.

He had also served as the second head of Belgorod from 1994 to 2001.

He is an honorary citizen of Belgorod.

== Biography ==
Georgy Golikov was born in Belgorod on 10 April 1950.

In 1974, he graduated from the Kharkov Institute of Municipal Construction Engineers.

In 1996, Golikov became the second head of Belgorod. From 2001 to 2003, he was a representative of the Belgorod Regional Duma in the Federation Council of Russia. In 2003, he became a member of the State Duma.

Since 2011, after he left the parliament, Golikov has been working at the Belgorod State Technological University V. G. Shukhov as the chief engineer of the university and associate professor of the department of construction and urban economy.

== Family ==
His son, Vasily (born in 1980), had been the deputy head of the administration of the city of Belgorod, under Yury Galdun.

== Awards ==
He was awarded the Order of Friendship.
