= Konstantin Polezhayev =

Russian politician (1972–2026)

- Константин Полежаев
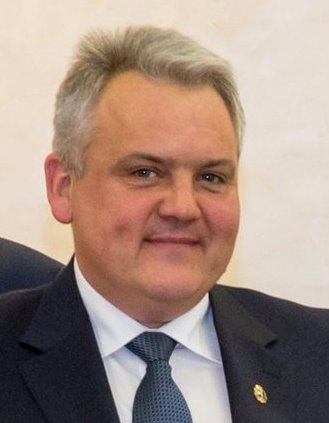
- Polezhayev in 2018

Deputy Governor of Belgorod Oblast
- In office 21 January 2019 – 4 July 2023
- Preceded by: Yury Galdun

5th Head of Belgorod
- In office 17 November 2015 – 21 January 2019
- Preceded by: Sergey Bozhenov
- Succeeded by: Yury Galdun

Personal details
- Born: 14 August 1972 Belgorod, Russian SFSR, Soviet Union
- Died: September 2026 (aged 54) Ukraine
- Cause of death: Drone strike

Konstantin Alekseyevich Polezhayev (Russian: Константин Алексеевич Полежаев; 14 August 1972 – September 2026) was a Russian politician who was the deputy governor of Belgorod Oblast on housing and communal services from 21 January 2019 until 2023.

Polezhayev served as the fifth head of Belgorod from 2015 to 2019.

After being convicted of bribery in 2024, he signed a contract with the Russian military where he was killed in September 2026 during the war in Ukraine.

== Life and career ==
Konstantin Polezhayev was born in Belgorod on 14 August 1972.

In 1996, he graduated from the Kharkiv State Automobile and Road Technical University with a degree in civil engineering for the construction of roads and airfields.

From 1996 to October 2004, he worked as an engineer, deputy head of department, head of the technical supervision department of the State Institution "Department of Public Roads and Transport of the Administration of the Belgorod Oblast". From October 2004, he worked as acting, then chief engineer of the regional road administration. On 19 November 2007, he became the head of the State Institution "Department of Public Roads and Transport of the Administration of the Belgorod Region".

On 5 November 2013, Polezhaev was appointed First Deputy Mayor of Belgorod. On 7 October 2015, he worked as acting head of the Belgorod City Administration.

On 17 November 2015, he was officially elected mayor of Belgorod, as 32 out of 39 deputies voted for Polezhayev.

On 21 January 2019, he was appointed Deputy Governor of the Belgorod Oblast, as Head of the Housing and Utilities Department of the region.

In August 2024, Polezhayev was convicted of bribery, but was later released in October 2024 to join the Russian military. On 22 September 2026, he was reported to have died after being severely injured by a drone strike during the war in Ukraine.
