= Open access in Russia =

In January 2008, Russian, Belarusian, and Ukrainian academics issued the "Belgorod Declaration" in support of open access to scientific and cultural knowledge. Russian supporters of the international "Open Access 2020" campaign, launched in 2016, include Belgorod State University, National Electronic Information Consortium (NEICON), and Webpublishers Association.

== Repositories ==
There are a number of collections of scholarship in Russia housed in digital open access repositories. They contain journal articles, book chapters, data, and other research outputs that are free to read.

== See also ==
- Science and technology in Russia
