= Valery Skrug =

Russian politician

- Валерий Скруг
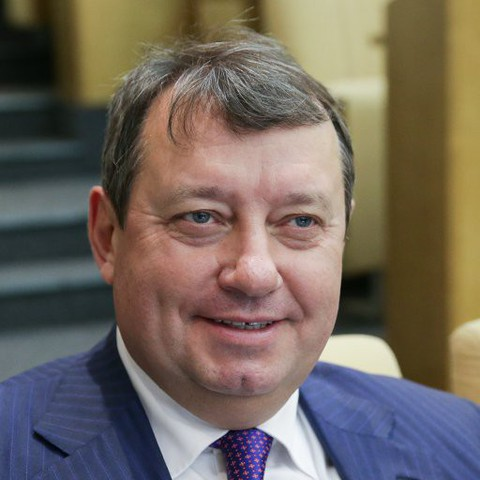

Member of the State Duma for Belgorod Oblast
- Incumbent
- Assumed office 12 October 2021
- Preceded by: Sergey Bozhenov
- Constituency: Belgorod (No. 75)

Member of the State Duma (Party List Seat)
- In office 5 October 2016 – 12 October 2021
- In office 25 May 2011 – 21 December 2011

Personal details
- Born: 20 June 1963 (age 63) Vikno, Chernivtsi Oblast, Ukrainian SSR, USSR
- Party: United Russia
- Children: 2
- Education: All-Russian Federal Institute of Finance and Economics; RANEPA

Valery Stepanovich Skrug (Russian: Валерий Степанович Скруг; 20 June 1963, Vikno, Chernivtsi Oblast, Zastavna Raion) is a Russian political figure, deputy of the 5th, 7th and 8th State Dumas.

In 1994, Skrug was appointed president of the Belgorod Region Chamber of Commerce and Industry. In 2001 and 2005, he was elected deputy of the Belgorod City Duma of the 3rd and 4th convocations. In 2011, he received a deputy mandate for the 5th State Duma. Skrug was re-elected in 2016 and 2021 for the 7th and 8th State Dumas, respectively.

== Sanctions ==
He was sanctioned by the UK government in 2022 in relation to the Russo-Ukrainian War.

== Awards ==
- Order of Friendship
- Order "For Merit to the Fatherland"
