= Yury Galdun =

Kazakh-born Russian statesman and politician

- Юрий Галдун

6th Head of Belgorod
- In office 26 March 2019 – 13 October 2021
- Preceded by: Konstantin Polezhayev
- Succeeded by: Anton Ivanov

Personal details
- Born: Yury Vladimirovich Galdun; 19 May 1962 (age 64) Pavlodar, Kazakhstan, Soviet Union

Yury Vladimirovich Galdun (Russian: Юрий Владимирович Галдун; born on 19 May 1962), is a Kazakh-born Russian statesman and politician, head of Belgorod from 2019 to 2021.

== Biography ==
Yury Galdun was born on 19 May 1962 in Pavlodar in Kazakhstan. He moved to Tselinograd, where he graduated from high school in 1979. In 1985, he graduated from the Tselinograd Civil Engineering Institute.

In 1999, Galdun moved to Belgorod, where he took the position of an engineer at the Belgorod CHPP. In 2000, he completed a course of study at the Eurasian University named after L.N. Gumilyov with a degree in Economics and Management in Construction, with a degree in Engineer-Economist. He worked in Belgorod in senior positions in several organizations.

From December 2012 to September 2013, he worked as the first deputy head of the administration of Belgorod. From October 2013 to August 2014, he served as head of the Belgorod District Administration. Since 2015, Galdun has worked as the head of the Department of Housing and Communal Services of the Belgorod Oblast.

In January 2019, Galdun was appointed Acting Mayor of Belgorod. On 26 March 2019, during a meeting of the City Council, he officially assumed the position of head of the administration of Belgorod, 30 out of 34 members of parliament voted for his candidacy. The appearance of the new mayor to take the oath was accompanied by the main theme song from Star Wars. The video of taking the oath caused a great resonance in social networks, as the event was covered by major Russian and foreign news outlets. The event also got into the news review of the entertainment show "Evening Urgant". On March 28, the officials, Deputy Mayor Andrey Miskov, and Vladimir Merzilkin, chief of the mayor's office of Belgorod resigned over rising controversy over the Star Wars theme the day Galdun took oath in office.

In 7 October 2021, Galdun resigned as the Mayor of Belgorod. The application for resignation of his own free will was considered on October 13 at a meeting of the City Council.

In early February 2022, it became known that Galdun received the position of adviser to the rector of the Shukhov Belgorod State Technical University. On 11 February, Galdun officially announced that at the new place of work he will fulfill the duties of the vice-rector of the university for sectoral and territorial development.

On 29 August 2022, Galdun has left as the rector of the Shukhov Belgorod State Technical University.
