= Belgorod State University =

Public university in Belgorod, Russia

Coordinates: 50.5941°N 36.5769°E

The National Research University "Belgorod State University" / (BelSU)
- Белгородский государственный национальный исследовательский университет (НИУ БелГУ)
- Type: Public
- Established: 1876
- Rector: Oleg Nikolaevich Polukhin
- Students: 25,000
- Location: Belgorod, Russia
- Website: bsu.edu.ru/en/=
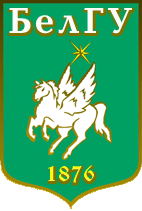

University rankings

Regional – Overall
- QS Emerging Europe and Central Asia: 195 (2022)

The National Research University "Belgorod State University" (BelSU) (Russian: Белгородский государственный национальный исследовательский университет (НИУ БелГУ)) is a university in Belgorod, Russia. Belgorod State University is one of the oldest universities in Belgorod and the largest university in the Belgorod region. The university has 25,000 students from 85 regions of Russia, 1800 foreign students from 76 countries, 72 institutions and faculty, 2 branches, 98 departments and 74 research centers and laboratories.

== History ==
On September 26, 1876 in the district town of Belgorod, the Teacher's Training Institute was founded by the order of the Russian Ministry of Public Education.

On June 4, 1919 Belgorod Teacher's Training Institute was reorganized into Belgorod Pedagogical Institute by the order of the People's Commissariat for Education of the RSFSR, and in 1920 it was reorganized into Belgorod Institute of Public Education. In 1922 Belgorod Institute of Public Education was reorganized into Belgorod Practical Institute of Public Education, which was reordered into the Pedagogical Secondary School in September, 1923. In 1939 it became the Teacher's Training Institute again.

The university had to temporarily suspend its operation in 1941 due to the outbreak of World War II and resumed its work only when the area had been completely liberated – in 1944, but in a new place – the town of Stary Oskol (Belgorod region) because Belgorod came out of war almost totally destroyed. Since 1957, the university has been located in Belgorod.

== University Today ==
- 23 thousand students from all regions of Russia;
- 3 Bachelor's and master's degree programs in English;
- 14 Associates and Members of Russian Academy of Sciences;
- 7 Institutes, 3 Faculties, Medical College, 1 branch;

Over five years the university received 2 billion rubles of federal funding, which allowed the university to complete the projects within some research programs, to build a new dormitory for 1,000 residents and an 80-apartment house for young scientists. Belgorod State University consists of several campuses.

== Research centres and laboratories ==
Today BelSU is home to 23,000 students. The university has nine educational and research innovation complexes; 50 research centers and laboratories, including:

- 21 research and educational centers;
- 26 research centers and research laboratories;
- 3 common use centers of scientific equipment;
- BelSU High-tech Solutions Tech Park with a business incubator;

In 2015, on the basis of BelSU there was established the Regional Microbiological Center

The university library system includes 11 reading rooms (including three rooms with open access to the Library collection), 9 lending libraries, and over 1.2 million items in the Library collection.

== University in rankings ==
Round University Rankings

Position 641

Webometrics Ranking of World Universities

Position 1777 among 11 999 universities and scientific organizations. The 20th position among 1306 Russian universities and scientific organizations.

Ranking Web of Repositories

Position 812, the 4th place among 23 Russian universities and scientific organizations

== Student life ==
The university has a Youth Media Holding, which includes an editorial office of a youth supplement to the News of BelSU newspaper – “Nota Bene”, BelSU's (White Goose) Radio, TUT TV and the site of the Youth Editorial Office [4]

== Svetlana Khorkina Educational and Sports Complex ==
Svetlana Khorkina Educational and Sports Complex The 36.7-thousand-square-meter complex houses a 50-meter swimming pool with springboards (up to 10 meters high), an athletics arena, a universal arena, a chess club guided by Grandmaster Alexander Alexandrovich Ivanov (Belgorod), gyms, rooms for table tennis, rooms for dance and aerobics.

== See also ==
- Open access in Russia
