= Belgorod Technological University =

Technical university in Belgorod, Russia

Belgorod State Technological University named after V.G. Shukhov
- Белгородский государственный технологический университет им. В. Г. Шухова
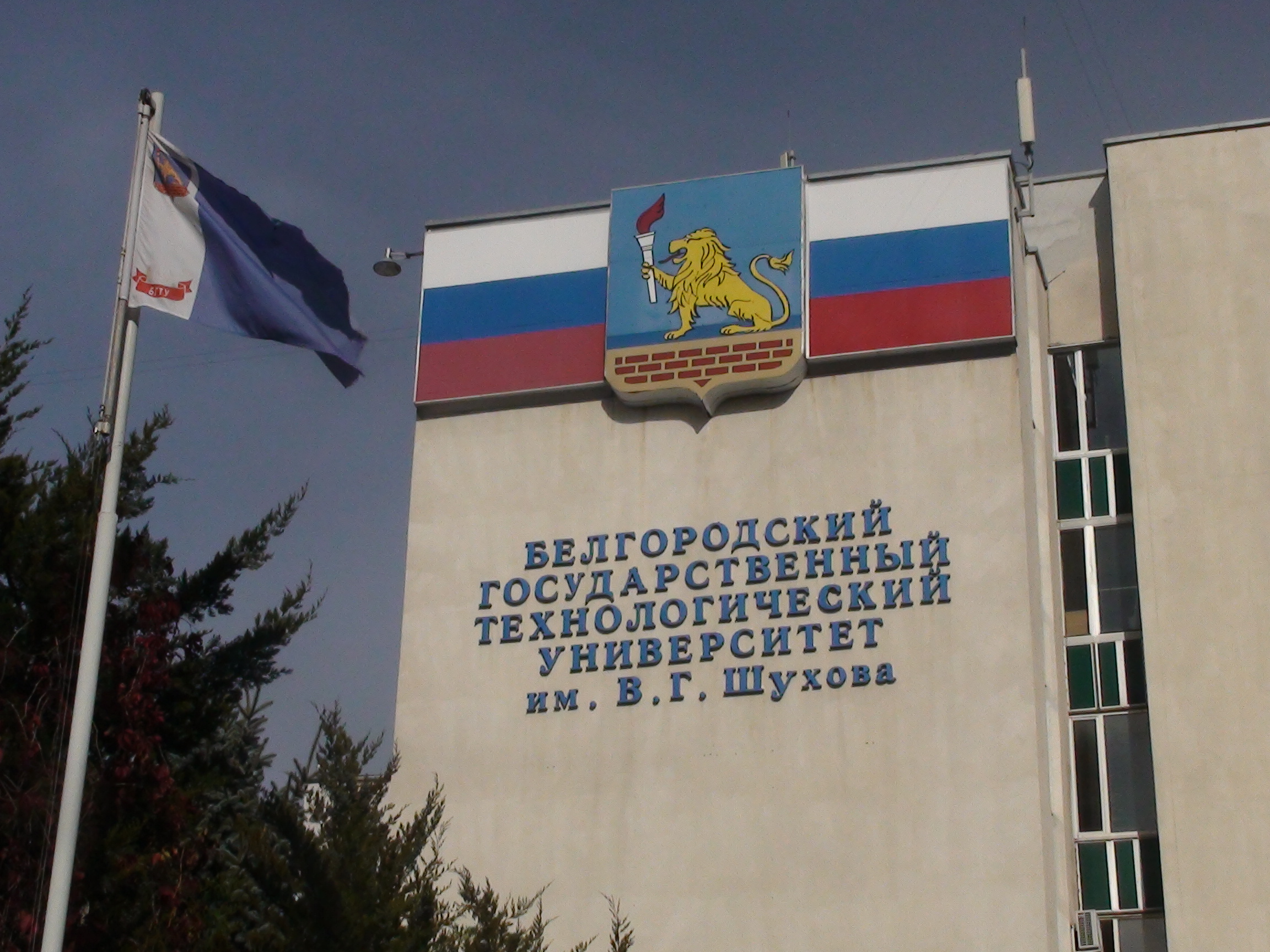
- Former names: Belgorod Technological Institute; Belgorod State Technological Academy of building materials
- Motto: "Свой дом — своими руками"
- Motto in English: "Your own home - with your own hands"
- Type: Public
- Established: April 29, 1954
- President: A.M. Gridchin
- Rector: S.N. Glagolev
- Students: 25000 approx.
- Other students: > 1000
- Location: Belgorod, Belgorod Oblast, Russian Federation; 50.581245°N 36.596273°E
- Campus: 0.39 km^{2} (0.15 sq mi)
- Website: en.bstu.ru

University rankings

Regional – Overall
- QS Emerging Europe and Central Asia: 351-400 (2022)

Belgorod State Technological University named after V.G. Shukhov (BSTU) (Russian: Белгородский государственный технологический университет им. В. Г. Шухова) is a technological university based in Belgorod, Russia. It specializes in the field of the construction materials. It trains experts for the construction industry and for other fields.

== History ==
University was found as Belgorod Technological Institute of Building Materials according to Decision of USSR Council Minister dated by April 29, 1954 No. 797 and according to order of high and specialized secondary education Department USSR dated by June 15, 1970 No. 419. Belgorod Technological Institute of Building Materials was renamed in Belgorod State Technological Academy of Building Materials according to State Committee of High Education RF dated by April 29, 1994 No. 355. Belgorod State Technological Academy of Building Materials was renamed in State Educational Establishment of high Professional Education«Belgorod State Technological University named after V. G. Shoukhov» according to Ministry of Education RF dated by March 27, 2003 No. 1249.

== International cooperation ==
By convention, the high-ranking guests from abroad plant trees on "Alley of friendship" ("Alleya Druzhby").

BSTU signed the contract on cooperation in educational and scientific activity with Tianjin Foreign Studies University on October 24, 2014.

== University in rankings ==
BSTU named after Shukhov was ranked 55 in the list of best universities of CIS by rating agency RAEX.

The university also was ranked 50 in «ARES-2014» rating.

== Faculties ==
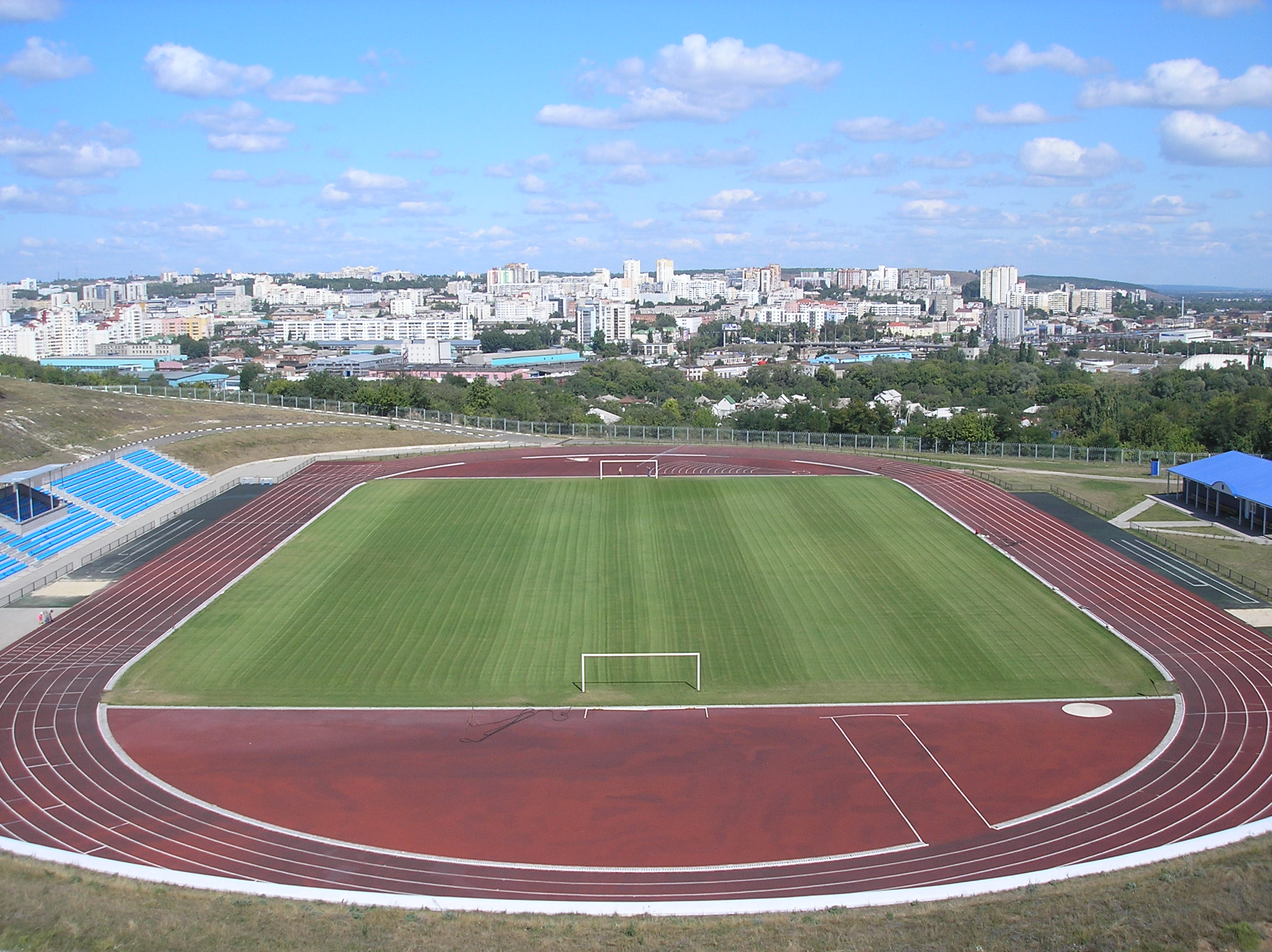
BSTU sport stadium
