= Sergey Bozhenov (politician, born 1957) =

Russian politician

- Сергей Боженов
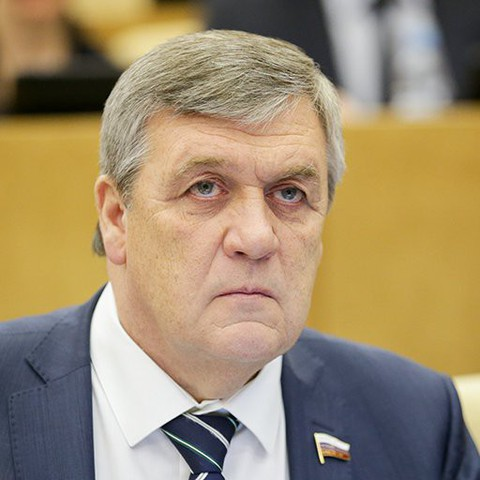

Member of the State Duma for Belgorod Oblast
- In office 5 October 2016 – 12 October 2021
- Preceded by: constituency re-established
- Succeeded by: Valery Skrug

4th Head of Belgorod
- In office 8 February 2011 – 17 November 2015
- Preceded by: Vasily Potryasaeyev
- Succeeded by: Konstantin Polezhayev

Personal details
- Born: 15 September 1957 (age 68) Belenikhino, RSFSR, USSR
- Party: United Russia

Sergey Andreyevich Bozhenov (Russian: Сергей Андреевич Боженов; born on 15 September 1957), is a Russian statesman and politician. He was a deputy of the State Duma's VII convocation as a member of the United Russia faction, and a member of the State Duma committee on education and science. He is a candidate of Sociological Sciences.

== Biography ==
Sergey Bozhenov was born on 15 September 1957.

In 1976, he graduated from the Belgorod Industrial College.

From 1976 to 1978, he served in the Strategic Missile Forces. After serving in the army, he went to work as an electrician at a Belgorod plastics processing plant. While working at the plant, he was elected secretary of the Komsomol committee. In 1983, he worked in the city committee of the Komsomol, a year later he headed the department for work with the Komsomol organizations in the regional committee of the Komsomol.

Between 1987 and 1989, he was transferred to the Belgorod City Committee of the CPSU, worked in the department of personnel, organizational and party work. In 1988, after completing military service, he received a higher education in the specialty "electrical machines", graduating from the All-Union Order of the Red Banner of Labor Correspondence Polytechnic Institute, with the qualification of an "electrical engineer".

In 1989, he returned to the Belplast OJSC plant as deputy director. From 1993 to 1998, he held various managerial positions at Belgorod enterprises. In 1998 he began to work in the regional administration. For ten years, from 2000 to 2010, Bozhenov was the deputy mayor. In 2010, he became deputy governor and headed the personnel policy department.

In 2002 he received his second higher education at the faculty of "state and municipal administration" in the Belgorod branch of the Oryol Regional Academy of Civil Service. In the same place, in 2009, he successfully defended his Ph.D. thesis "Development of strategic city management: socio-technological aspect". He is a candidate of Sociological Sciences.

The Belgorod City Council of Deputies twice (on 8 February 2011 and 20 September 2013) elected Bozhenov to the post of head of the administration of the city of Belgorod. From 2011 to 2015, he worked as the head of the administration of the city of Belgorod. In 2015, Bozhenov resigned ahead of schedule and was appointed Deputy Governor of Belgorod Oblast.

On 18 September 2016, Bozhenov was elected to the State Duma of the VII convocation (Belgorod single-mandate constituency No. 75).

=== Legislative activity ===
From 2016 to 2019, during the term of office of a deputy of the State Duma of the VII convocation, Bozhenov co-authored 19 legislative initiatives and amendments to draft federal laws.
