= Nikita Rumyantsev =

Russian politician (born 1988)

- Никита Румянцев

Deputy of the 8th State Duma
- Incumbent
- Assumed office 19 September 2021

Personal details
- Born: 27 April 1988 (age 38) Balashikha, Moscow Oblast, Russian Soviet Federative Socialist Republic, USSR
- Party: United Russia
- Education: Gubkin Russian State University of Oil and Gas

Nikita Rumyantsev (Russian: Никита Геннадьевич Румянцев; born 27 April 1988, Balashikha, Moscow Oblast) is a Russian political figure and deputy of the 8th State Duma. He worked as an assistant to the deputy Andrei Skoch. In 2020, Rumyantsev became a deputy of the Belgorod Oblast Duma. Since September 2021, he has served as a deputy of the 8th State Duma. In February 2021,

== Sanctions ==
Rumyantsev was included in the sanctions list of the European Union.

He was sanctioned by the UK government in March 2022 in relation to the Russo-Ukrainian War.
