= Valentin Demidov =

Ukrainian and Russian politician

- Валентин Демидов
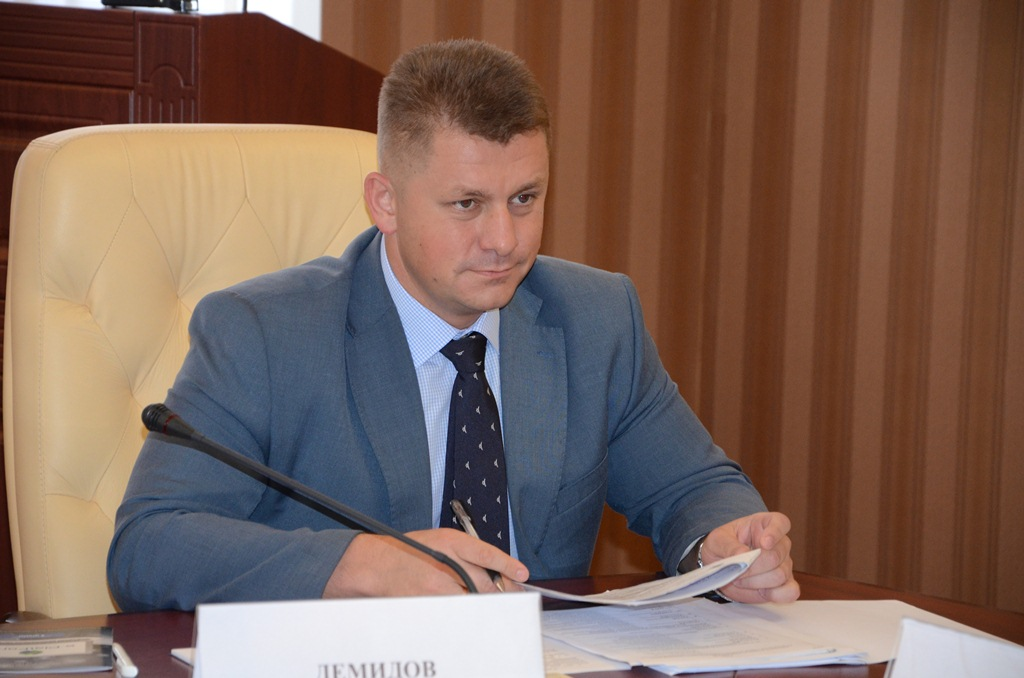
- Demidov in June 2016

8th Head of Belgorod
- Incumbent
- Assumed office 17 January 2023
- Preceded by: Anton Ivanov

Head of Belgorod (acting)
- In office 8 November 2022 – 17 January 2023

5th Head of Simferopol
- In office 7 April 2021 – 11 January 2022
- Preceded by: Yelena Protsenko
- Succeeded by: Mikhail Balakhanov (acting)

Head of Simferopol (acting)
- In office 17 February 2021 – 7 April 2021

Minister of Economic Development of the Republic of Crimea
- In office 16 June 2015 – December 2016

Mayor of Armyansk
- In office 2007 – 16 June 2015

Personal details
- Born: Valentin Valentinovich Demidov; 28 November 1976 (age 49) Petrovsky, Lipetsk Oblast, Russian SFSR, Soviet Union
- Party: United Russia
- Children: 2

Valentin Valentinovich Demidov (Russian: Валентин Валентинович Демидов; born on 28 November 1976), is a Russian politician who is currently the 8th head of Belgorod, since 17 January 2023.

He had also served as the 5th head of Simferopol from 2021 to 2022 and as the Minister of Economic Development of the Republic of Crimea from 2015 to 2016.

Prior to his restoration of his Russian citizenship in 2014, Demydov was the Mayor of Armyansk from 2007 to 2015. He had been a member of Armiansk City Council from 2002 to 2010. Since 2014, he has been a member a member of the United Russia party, and from 2005 to 2014, he was a member of the Party of Regions at the time he was a Ukrainian citizen.

== Biography ==
Early life and education

Valentin Demidov was born on 28 November 1976 in the village of the Petrovsky state farm, Lipetsk Oblast. In 1986 his family moved to Armyansk, where his mother began working in the Bureau of Technical Inventory.

He studied at Armyansk Secondary School No. 1. In 1994 he entered the Faculty of Law of Simferopol State University named after M. V. Frunze (since 1999 — Taurida National University named after V. I. Vernadsky), graduating in 2000 with a degree in jurisprudence.

In 2006 he also graduated from the Odesa Regional Institute of Public Administration of the National Academy of Public Administration under the President of Ukraine with a degree of Master of Public Administration.

Early career

Demidov began his career in Armyansk in September 1998 as a specialist in the self-supporting group Planida. Four months later he became chief legal adviser of the Pension Fund of Ukraine in Armyansk.

In May 1999 he joined Crimean Titan, the largest producer of titanium dioxide in Eastern Europe. He started as a legal consultant in the Claims and Contracts Bureau, and by 2011 became Deputy Head of the Legal Department — Head of the Claims Arbitration Bureau.

Political activity in Armyansk

In 2002 he was elected deputy of the Armyansk City Council, where he served as secretary between 2002 and 2007. In 2005 he joined the Party of Regions, and in 2006 he was re-elected as deputy, also heading the Party’s Armyansk branch.

In 2007 Demidov was elected mayor of Armyansk. He was re-elected in 2010. After the annexation of Crimea by Russia, he remained in office and, under Russian law, became head of the city administration of Armyansk. His tenure was criticized for granting privileges to relatives irrespective of professional qualifications.

Ministerial and administrative positions

On 16 June 2015 Sergey Aksyonov appointed Demidov Minister of Economic Development of the Republic of Crimea. He resigned in December 2016 of his own accord.

From January 2017 to September 2019 he was Director of the Department for Territorial Development and Interaction with Local Authorities of Sevastopol.

In September 2020 Demidov became Deputy Head of the Simferopol City Administration, responsible for internal information policy and interethnic relations.

Head of Simferopol

On 17 February 2021, following the resignation of Mayor Yelena Protsenko, Demidov became acting head of Simferopol. On 29 March 2021 he won the competition for the vacant post, and on 4 April 2021 the city council elected him as head of the city administration. He became the fifth head of Simferopol in the seven years since the annexation of Crimea by Russia.

On 30 December 2021 he left the post at his own request, and on 11 January 2022 his resignation was formally accepted by the city council.

Work in Belgorod

On 28 February 2022 Demidov was appointed Advisor to the Governor of Belgorod Oblast, Vyacheslav Gladkov.

On 12 September 2022 he became Advisor to the Mayor of Belgorod, Anton Ivanov, and on 12 October 2022 was appointed First Deputy Mayor.

On 8 November 2022 Demidov became acting Mayor of Belgorod. He was sworn into office on 17 January 2023.

== Personal life ==
He is married, and raises a son and a daughter.

He is an Orthodox Christian.
