= Belgorod =

City in Belgorod Oblast, Russia

Belgorod Белгород
- City
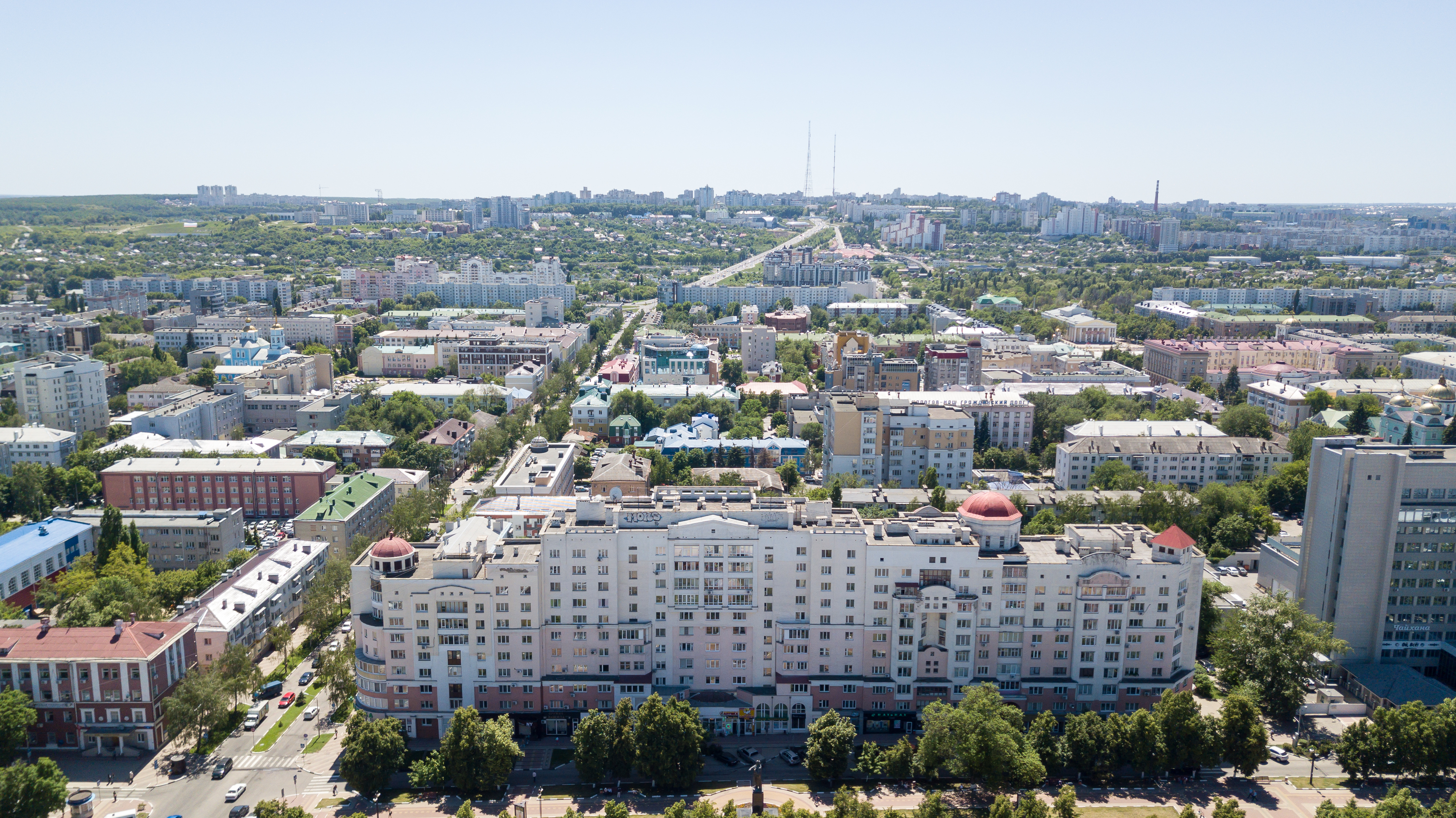
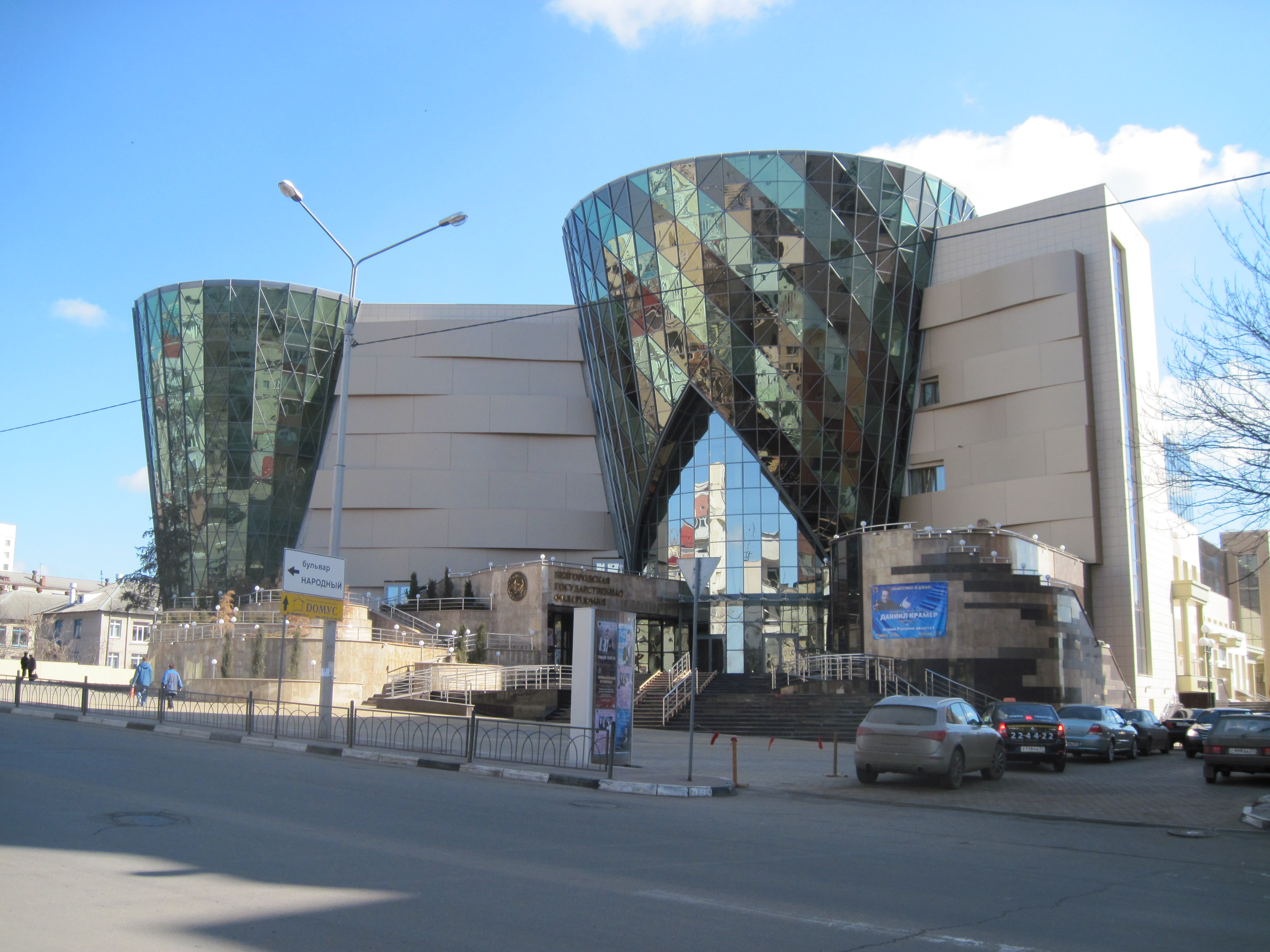
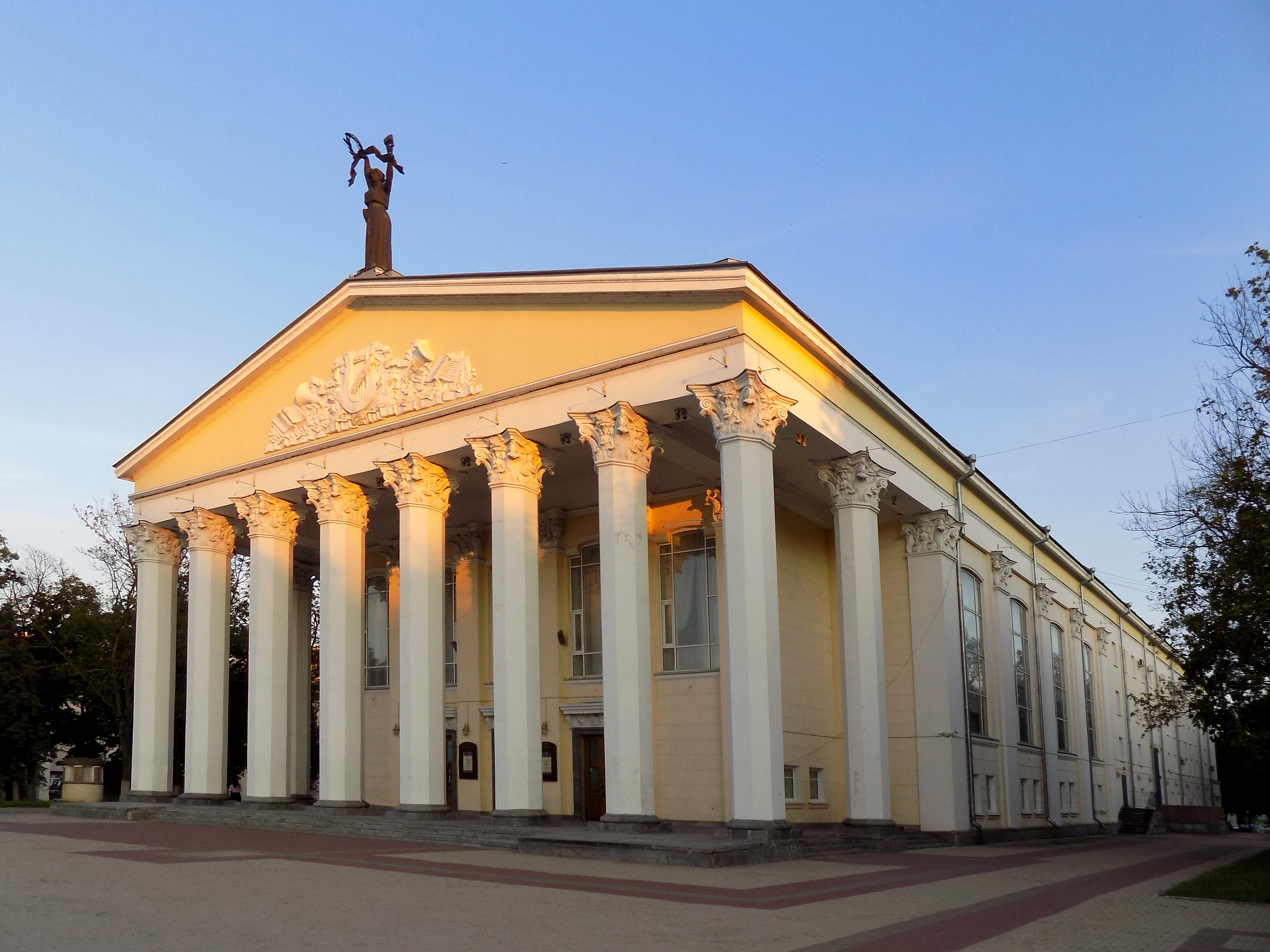
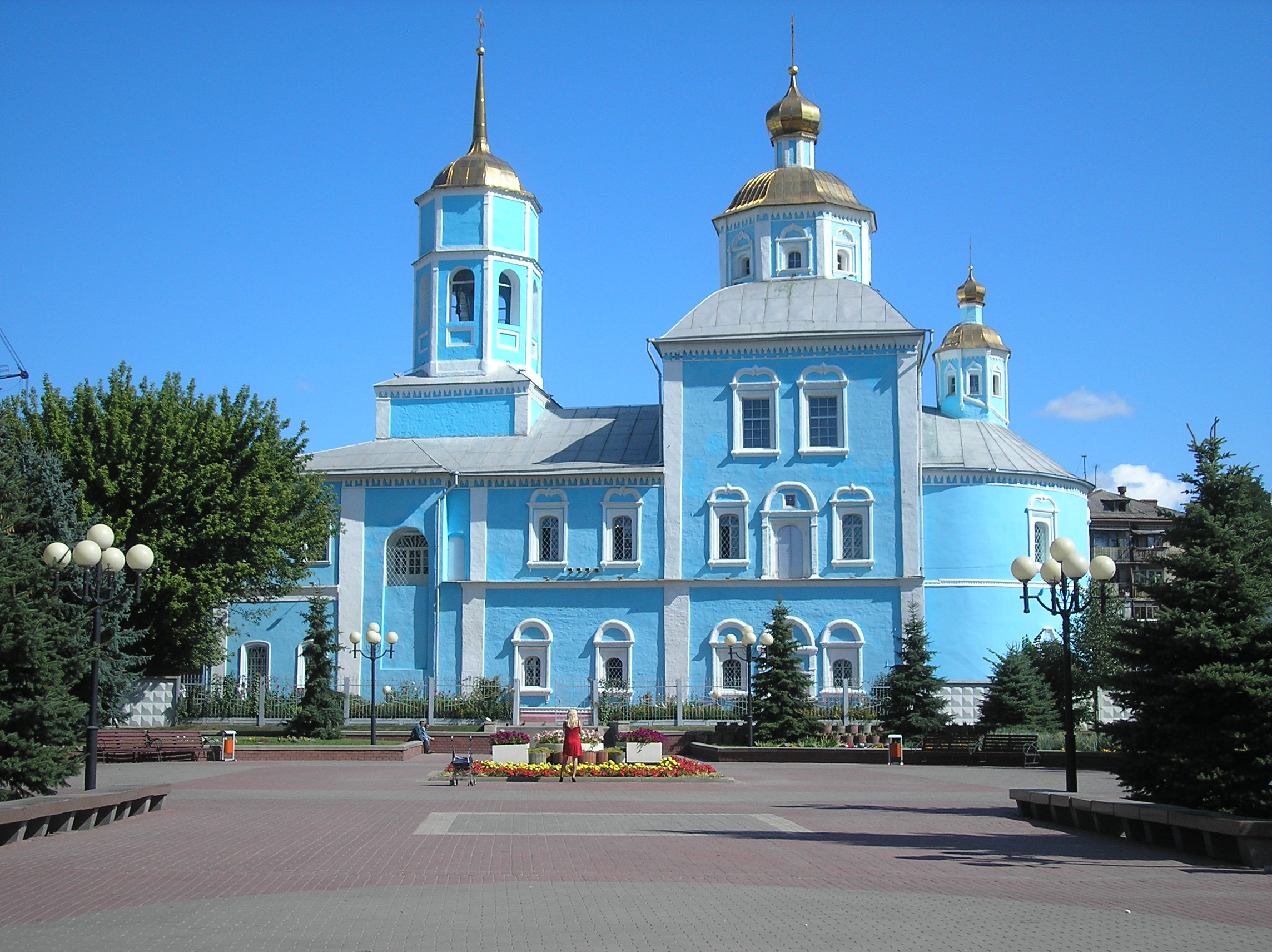
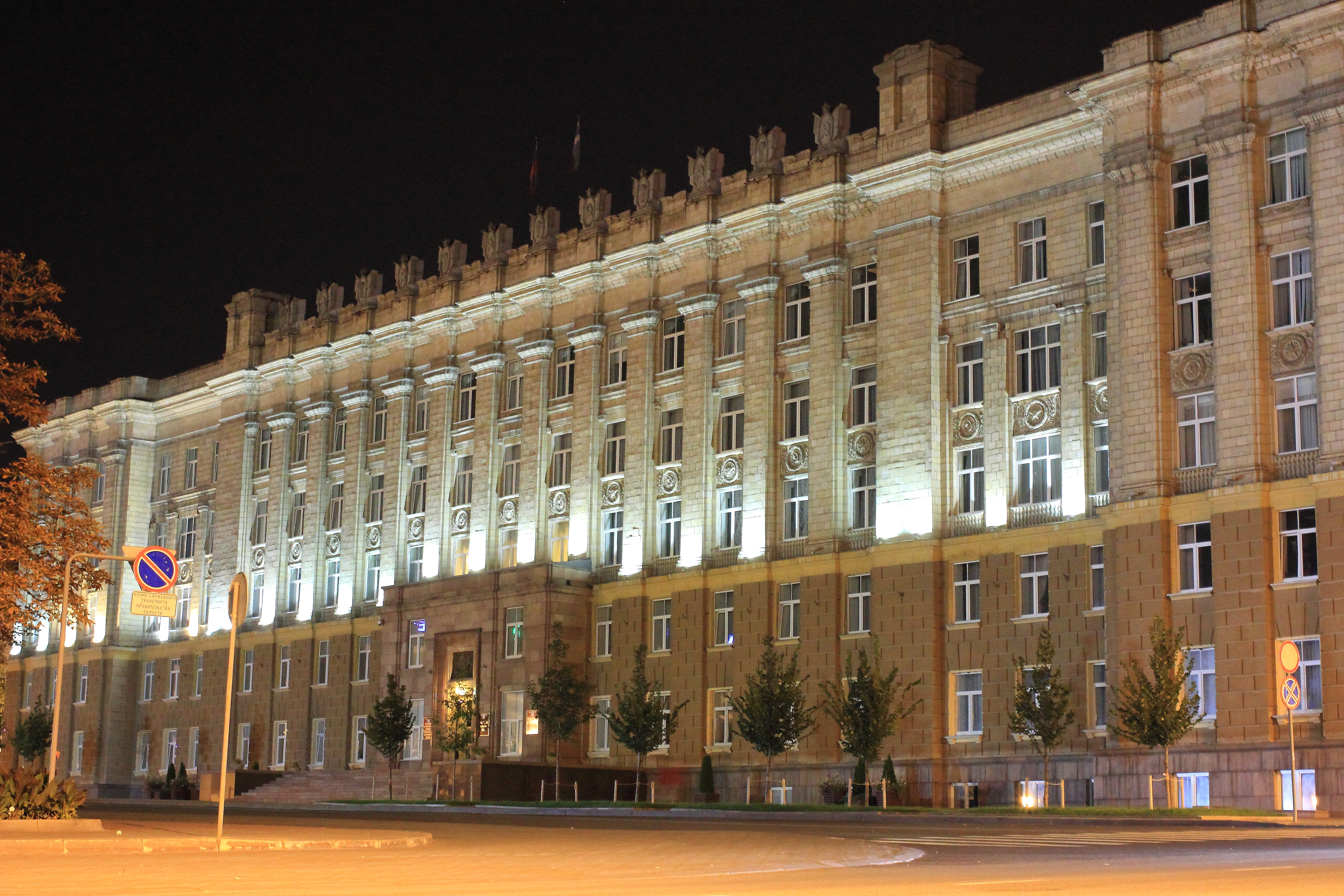
- Aerial view State Philharmonic Drama Theatre Church of the Theotokos Oblast administration building

- Flag Coat of arms
- Interactive map of Belgorod
- Location of Belgorod Belgorod (European Russia) Belgorod (Russia) Belgorod (Europe)
- Coordinates: 50°36′N 36°36′E
- Country: Russia
- Federal subject: Belgorod Oblast
- Founded: 1596

Government
  - Body: Council of Deputies
  - Mayor: Valentin Demidov (UR)
- Elevation: 130 m (430 ft)

Population (2010 Census)
  - Total: 356,402
  - Estimate (2025): 384,425 (+7.9%)
  - Rank: 49th in 2010

Administrative status
  - Subordinated to: city of oblast significance of Belgorod
  - Capital of: Belgorod Oblast, city of oblast significance of Belgorod

Municipal status
  - Urban okrug: Belgorod Urban Okrug
  - Capital of: Belgorod Urban Okrug
- Time zone: UTC+3 (MSK)
- Postal codes: 308000–308002, 308004–308007, 308009–308020, 308023–308027, 308029, 308031–308034, 308036, 308099, 308700, 308880, 308890, 308899, 308940, 308960, 308961, 308967, 308971–308974, 308991–308994
- Dialing code: +7 472
- OKTMO ID: 14701000001
- City Day: 5 August
- Website: www.beladm.ru

Belgorod (Russian: Белгород, pronounced [ˈbʲelɡərət]) is a city that serves as the administrative center of Belgorod Oblast, Russia, located on the Seversky Donets River, approximately 40 kilometers (25 mi) north of the border with Ukraine. It has a population of 339,978 (2021 census).

It was founded in 1596 as a defensive fort on the southern border of Russia. Contested by various factions during World War I and the Russian Civil War, the city served as the temporary Soviet Ukrainian capital at the turn of 1918 and 1919.

== Etymology ==
The name Belgorod (Белгород) in Russian literally means "white city", a compound of "белый" (bely, "white, light") and "город" (gorod, "town, city"). The name is a reference to the region's historical abundance of limestone.

== Demographics ==
The population of Belgorod is 339,978 as of the most recent censuses: 339,978 (2021 census); 356,402 (2010 census); 337,030 (2002 census); 300,408 (1989 Soviet census).

As of the 2021 Census, the ethnic composition of Belgorod was:

Ethnicity	2010		2021	
Ethnicity	Number	%	Number^{1}	%
Russians	312,104	94.1%	174,787	92.0%
Ukrainians	11,120	3.4%	4,109	2.2%
Others	8,386	2.5%	11,151	5.8%

^{1}149,931 people (or 44.1% of the population) residing in Belgorod did not state their ethnicity in the 2021 census.

Historical population

Year	Pop.	±%
1897	27,000	—
1926	31,000	+14.8%
1939	34,359	+10.8%
1959	72,278	+110.4%
1970	151,336	+109.4%

Year	Pop.	±%
1979	239,814	+58.5%
1989	300,408	+25.3%
2002	337,030	+12.2%
2010	356,402	+5.7%
2021	339,978	−4.6%

Source: Census data

== Geography ==
=== Urban layout ===
Like many Russian cities, Belgorod began as a fortified settlement. The oldest Belgorod fortress was built at the end of the 16th century on a chalk mountain. According to scientific excavations and surviving archival data, the first fortress outpost was erected in 1596. The site of the construction of the defensive facility was the top of the Belaya Gora ("White Mountain"). This is the highest point of the right bank of the Seversky Donets channel. On 17 September 1650, voivode Vasily Petrovich Golovin laid the foundation for the third Belgorod Fortress on the left bank of the Vezenitsa River, which flows into the Seversky Donets. In the fall of 1650, a wooden fort with 11 towers was attached to the rampart of the Belgorod line, which runs from the fortress town Bolkhovets to the mouth of the Vezelka River in the area of the former brewery. The two parts of the city were connected by the Nikolskaya Passage Tower located in the eastern wall of the Kremlin. The position of the eastern wall of the Kremlin corresponded to the modern street of the 50th anniversary of the Belgorod Oblast. With the expansion of the borders of the Russian state, the military significance of the Belgorod fortress gradually decreased and by the middle of the 18th century, only the Kremlin remained from the formidable fortress.

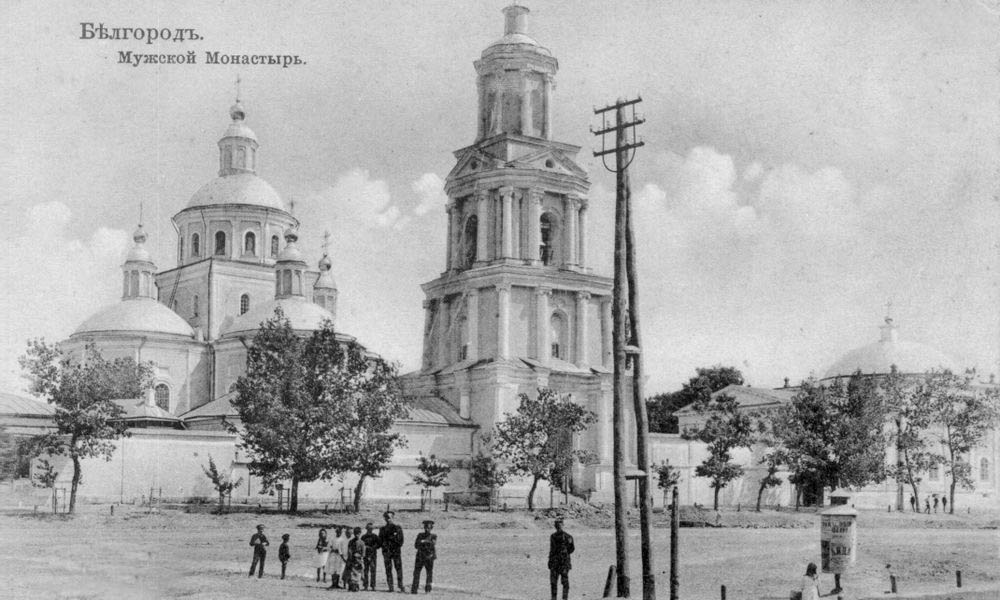
Men's Monastery in 1911

In the fall of 1766, the new governor, Andrei Fliverk pushed for a new city plan. A regular street plan was developed and signed on 18 April 1767. The architect's signature is not legible, but it may have been signed by Andrey Kvasov. The central part of the plan was occupied by an octahedral "marketplace" with 64 stone shops and 20 warehouse barns. Moskovskaya, Kievskaya, Voronezhskaya and Kharkovskaya streets ran from the trading area in four directions. According to the plan, it was supposed to divide the entire city into 16 quarters, 4 of which should be built up with stone houses, and the rest with wooden and huts. The plan was executed formally without taking into account the buildings that survived the fire, the Kremlin fortress and the terrain. On 28 April 1768, a new plan was developed under the leadership of Andrey Kvasov who was the author of a number of city plans. The plans overlaid the old city center layout and the projected one. It provided for a trading area, which in the west adjoined the fortress Kremlin, and in the east ended with stone benches of the Gostiny dvor in the form of two arcs. The central planning axis was also chosen relative to which the directions of mutually perpendicular streets were formed.

Travel notes which were published in 1781 showed the location of a sketch of the ramparts of the lost ancient settlement. Only in the middle of the 1950s, the archaeologist Arkady Nikitin carried out excavations at the site of the first fortress, where the remains of ancient ramparts and ditches were still clearly visible. though the fortress itself was destroyed already in the 1860s during the construction of the railway the eastern part of the chalk mountain, on which the Kremlin was located, was collapsed. The location of the first fortress approximately corresponded to the location of the modern car market on Byelaya Gora.

In the 1780s, during the general survey of the Russian lands, several plans of Belgorod were fulfilled. When drawing up plans, an overlay of the old and new layouts of Kvasov was used. The plans described above give a distorted position of church estates, which were fixed when the city was laid and, as a rule, did not change. The plan, signed by the titular adviser Salkov, is the most accurate plan of Belgorod in the second half of the 18th century.

=== Climate ===
Belgorod's climate is humid continental (Köppen climate classification Dfb slightly cooler than Dfa) featuring moderate precipitation. Winters are rather cold and changeable with frequent warmings followed by rains. Temperatures may occasionally fall below −15 °C (5 °F) for about one week or more. Summer is warm and either humid and rainy or hot and droughty. Autumn is mild and rainy. The Belgorod reservoirs get covered with ice by the end of November or the beginning of December, and the ice layer typically lasts until March or April.

- average year temperature: + 7.7 °C
- average humidity: 76%
- average wind speed: 5–7 m/s
- average precipitation 380–620 mm (14.96–24.41 in), mostly in summer.

Climate data for Belgorod
Month	Jan	Feb	Mar	Apr	May	Jun	Jul	Aug	Sep	Oct	Nov	Dec	Year
Record high °C (°F)	6.6 (43.9)	12.3 (54.1)	19.4 (66.9)	25.6 (78.1)	34.4 (93.9)	35.7 (96.3)	38.9 (102.0)	36.3 (97.3)	33.5 (92.3)	27.6 (81.7)	17.4 (63.3)	8.9 (48.0)	38.9 (102.0)
Mean daily maximum °C (°F)	−3.0 (26.6)	−2.9 (26.8)	2.8 (37.0)	13.2 (55.8)	20.5 (68.9)	23.9 (75.0)	26.0 (78.8)	25.2 (77.4)	18.6 (65.5)	11.1 (52.0)	1.9 (35.4)	−2.6 (27.3)	11.3 (52.3)
Daily mean °C (°F)	−6.1 (21.0)	−6.1 (21.0)	−0.4 (31.3)	8.9 (48.0)	15.5 (59.9)	19.4 (66.9)	21.8 (71.2)	21.2 (70.2)	15.1 (59.2)	8.0 (46.4)	−0.4 (31.3)	−5.6 (21.9)	7.7 (45.9)
Mean daily minimum °C (°F)	−10.0 (14.0)	−9.9 (14.2)	−4.0 (24.8)	−0.4 (31.3)	9.7 (49.5)	14.1 (57.4)	16.8 (62.2)	16.3 (61.3)	10.9 (51.6)	4.7 (40.5)	−2.8 (27.0)	−9 (16)	3.5 (38.3)
Record low °C (°F)	−34.5 (−30.1)	−29.7 (−21.5)	−31.1 (−24.0)	−9.7 (14.5)	−3.1 (26.4)	2.9 (37.2)	8.7 (47.7)	7.1 (44.8)	−2.5 (27.5)	−6.2 (20.8)	−21 (−6)	−32.1 (−25.8)	−34.5 (−30.1)
Average precipitation mm (inches)	39 (1.5)	35 (1.4)	35 (1.4)	32 (1.3)	53 (2.1)	55 (2.2)	64 (2.5)	37 (1.5)	46 (1.8)	46 (1.8)	40 (1.6)	44 (1.7)	526 (20.8)
Average precipitation days (≥ 1 mm)	11	9	9	7	8	7	7	5	7	7	8	10	95
Source 1: Климатические нормы (precipitation-precip days 1991-2020), belgorod-meteo.ru
Source 2: world-climates.com

== History ==
=== Before the 20th century ===
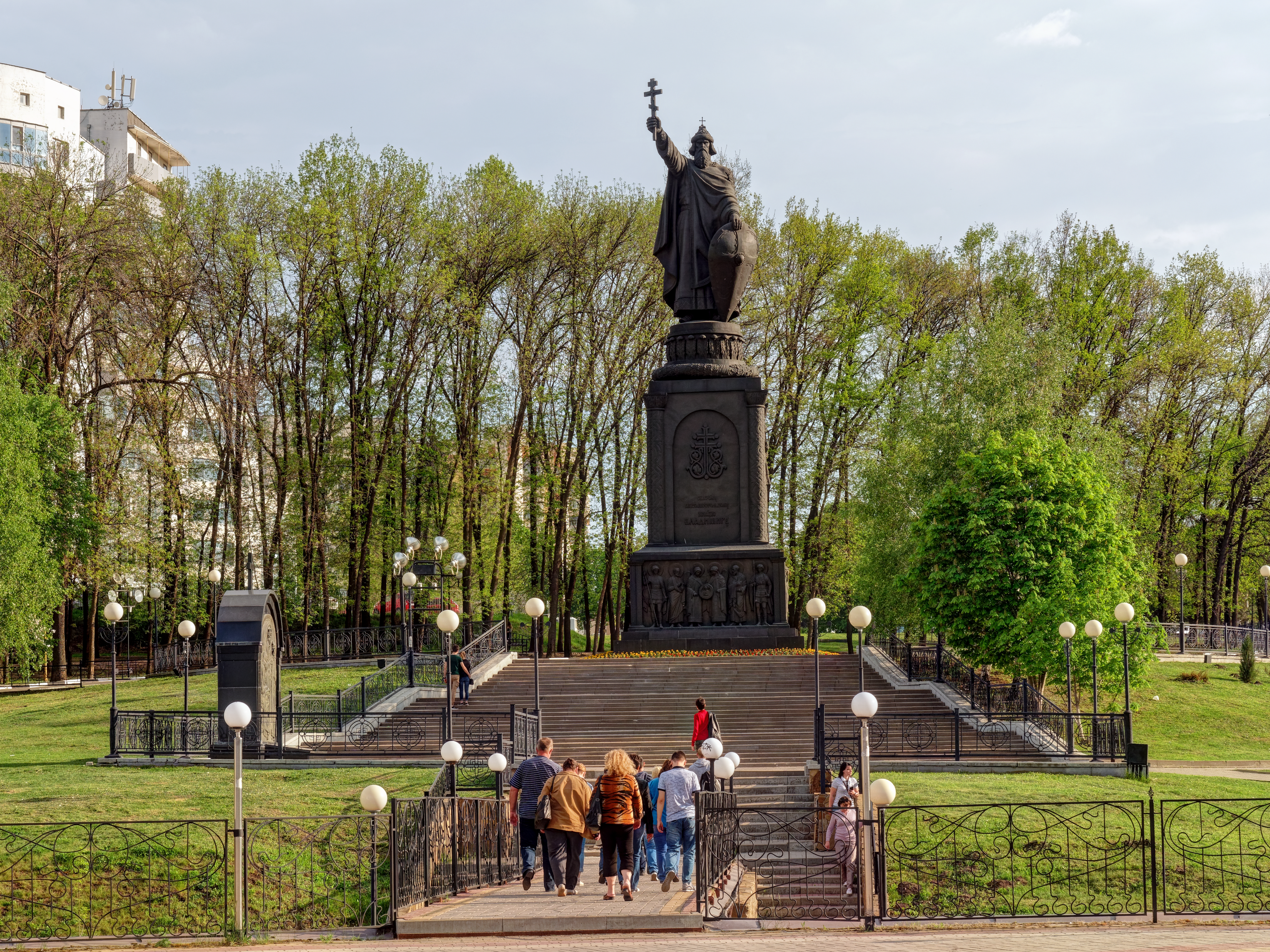
Monument to Grand Prince Vladimir the Great in Belgorod

There was a settlement of the Slavic tribe of Severians in the area, which was probably destroyed at the beginning of the 10th century by the nomadic Pechenegs. In 965, the lands in the upper reaches of Seversky Donets were annexed to the Principality of Pereyaslavl.

Records first mention the settlement in 1237, when the Mongol-led army of Batu Khan ravaged it during the Mongol invasion of Kievan Rus'. It is unclear whether this Belgorod stood on the same site as the current city. In 1596 Tsar Feodor Ioannovich of Russia ordered its re-establishment as one of numerous forts set up to defend Russian southern borders from the Crimean Tatars. Belgorod was part of a chain of fortification lines, created by Grand Duchy of Moscow and later the Tsardom of Russia to protect it from the Crimean–Nogai slave raids that ravaged the southern provinces of the country during the Russo-Crimean Wars. The tsar appointed two princes-governors to supervise the construction of Belgorod: Mikhail Vasilyevich Nozdrovaty and Andrei Romanovich Volkonsky. The first Belgorod fortress was built on the high right bank of the Seversky Donets, in the area of the current car market; the Belgorod Kremlin was close to the present-day Belaya Gora restaurant. The legendary White Mountain has not survived, as it was completely torn down for chalk mining in the 1950s.

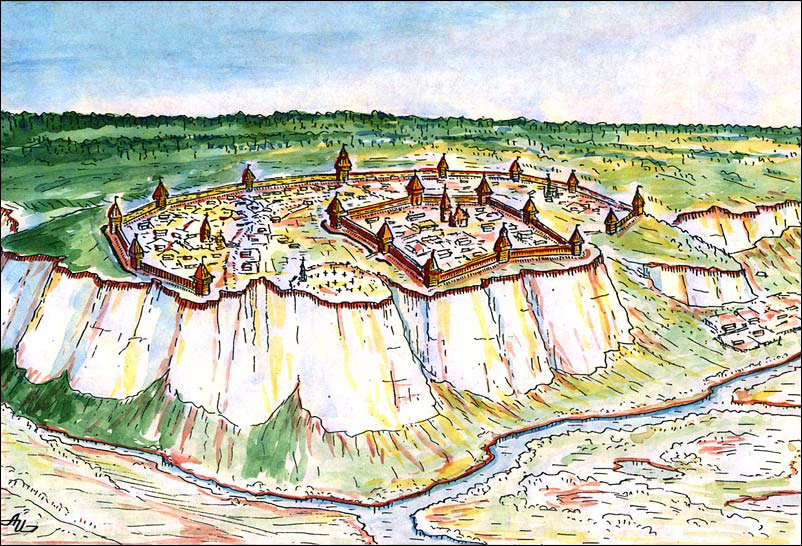
Belgorod fortress in the 17th century

The first Belgorod fortress stood for sixteen years, withstanding several major attacks, both from the Tatars and from the Polish–Lithuanian troops who participated in the wars with the Russian state during the Time of Troubles. In 1612 the Belgorod fortress was taken and burned by a detachment of Lithuanians. The governor, Nikita Likharev, by order of the tsar, was already building the second Belgorod fortress on the opposite bank of the Seversky Donets the following year, 1613. Over the next decades, Belgorodians repulsed a large number of attacks on their lands. By the middle of the 17th century, the question arose about the construction of a new Belgorod fortress three kilometers south of the existing one.

In the 17th century Belgorod suffered repeatedly from Tatar incursions, against which Russia built (from 1633 to 1740) an earthen wall, with twelve forts, extending upwards of 200 miles (320 kilometres) from the Vorskla in the west to the Don in the east, and called the Belgorod line. In 1666 the Moscow Patriarchate established an archiepiscopal see in the town.

Tsar Peter the Great visited Belgorod on the eve of the Battle of Poltava in 1709.

After the Russian border moved south following successful wars against the Polish–Lithuanian Commonwealth in the second half of the 17th century, the strategic importance of the city gradually decreased, and on 13 May 1785, by decree of Catherine II, Belgorod was excluded from the number of fortresses of the Russian Empire. From that moment on, the city plunged into the measured provincial life of the central black earth zone of Russia. Military life was replaced by agricultural life, the number of spiritual, educational, industrial and commercial institutions were growing, and in the historical chronicles of the Russian Empire, the city seems to have fallen asleep for a century. The Belgorod province disappeared from the geographical maps, and the city was for a long time a part of the first Kursk Governorate, then the Kursk province, and, finally, the Kursk region. A dragoon regiment had its base in the town until 1917.

=== 20th century ===
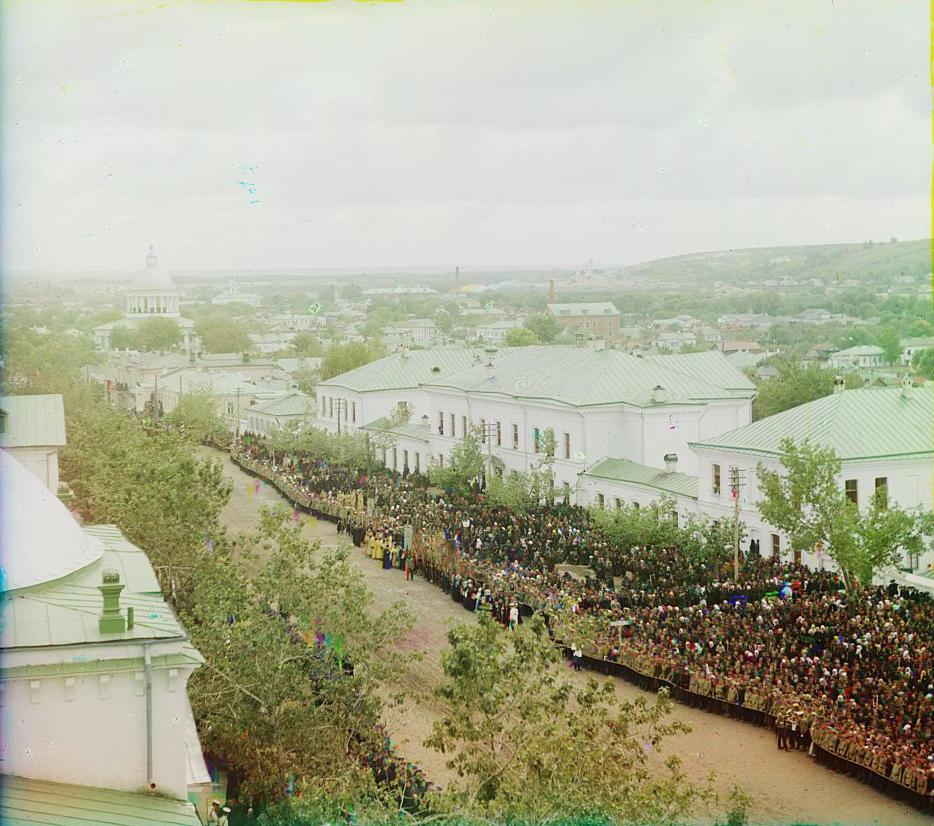
Glorification of Joasaph, Belgorod, 4 September 1911

Joasaph of Belgorod, an 18th-century bishop of Belgorod and Oboyanska, became widely venerated as a miracle worker and was glorified as a saint of the Russian Orthodox Church in 1911.

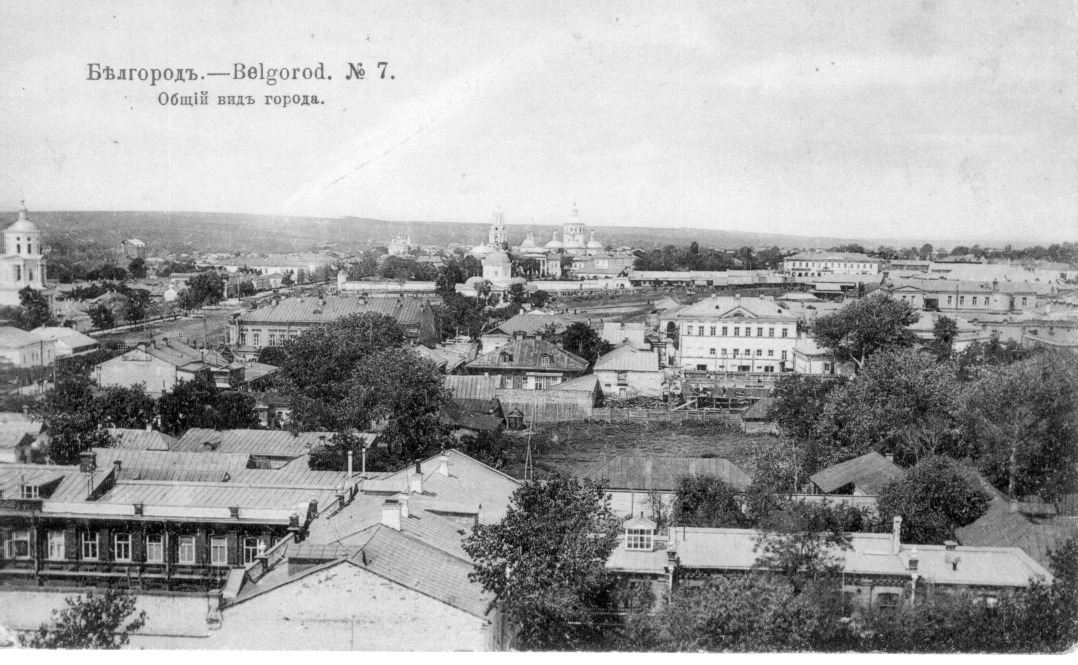
View of Belgorod in 1912

During World War I, in 1917, a Polish rifle regiment was stationed in the city. Soviet power was established in the city on 26 October (8 November) 1917. On 10 April 1918, troops of the Imperial German Army occupied Belgorod. After the conclusion of the Brest-Litovsk peace treaty of 9 February 1918 the demarcation line passed to the north of the city. Belgorod became part of the newly proclaimed Ukrainian People's Republic (February to May 1918) and Ukrainian State headed by Hetman Pavlo Skoropadskyi.

On 20 December 1918, after the overthrow of German-backed Skoropadskyi, the Soviet Red Army regained control over the city. From 24 December 1918 to 7 January 1919, the Provisional Workers' and Peasants' Government of Ukraine, then led by General Georgy Pyatakov, was based in Belgorod, before its relocation to Kharkiv. The city was then claimed by both the Ukrainian and Russian Soviet authorities. On 7 February 1919, it was recognized as part of the Russian Soviet Federative Socialist Republic; however, Soviet Ukraine still tried to regain the city. Russian Communists justified the incorporation into Russia by the area's agricultural importance to Russia and the possibility of the collapse of Soviet power in Ukraine, as a result of which Russia would lose its claim to the city. From 23 June to 7 December 1919, the Volunteer Army occupied the town as part of White-controlled South Russia.

From September 1925, the territorial 163rd Infantry Regiment of the 55th Infantry Division of Kursk was stationed in Belgorod. In September 1939, it was deployed to the 185th Infantry Division.

On 2 March 1935, the Presidium of the Central Executive Committee of the Soviet Union decided to allocate the city of Belgorod, Kursk region, into an independent administrative unit directly subordinate to the Kursk Regional Executive Committee.

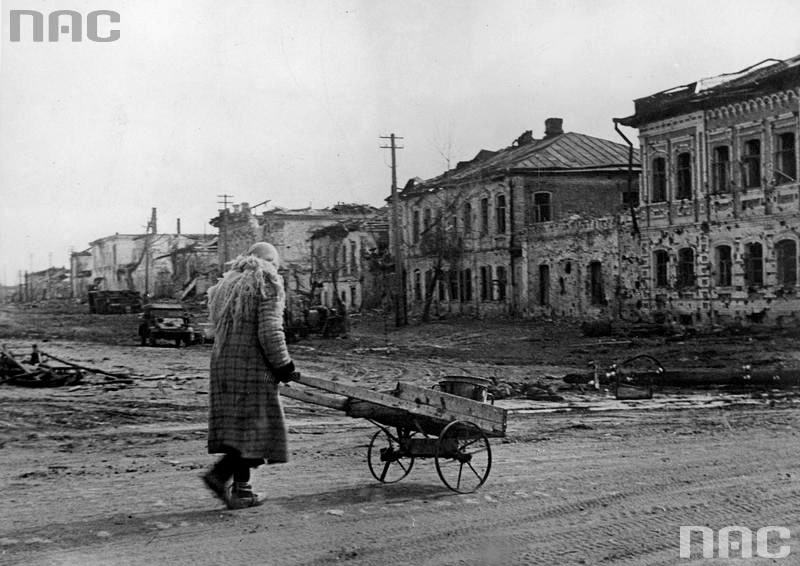
War destruction in Belgorod in 1943

The German Wehrmacht occupied Belgorod from 25 October 1941 to 9 February 1943. The Germans operated a forced labour battalion for Jews in the city. The Germans re-captured it on 18 March 1943 in the final move of the Third Battle of Kharkov. On 12 July 1943, during the Battle of Kursk, the largest tank battle in world history took place near Prokhorovka, and the Red Army definitively retook the city on 5/6 August 1943. The Belgorod Diorama is one of the World War II monuments commemorating the event.

In 1954, the city became the administrative center of Belgorod Oblast and rapidly developed as a regional industrial and cultural center.

=== 21st century ===
On 22 April 2013, a mass shooting occurred at approximately 2:20 PM Moscow time on a street in Belgorod. The shooter, identified as 31-year-old Sergey Pomazun (Russian: Сергей Помазун), opened fire with a semi-automatic rifle on several people at a gun store and on a sidewalk, killing all six people whom he hit: three people at the store and three passers-by, including two teenage girls. Pomazun was apprehended after an extensive day-long manhunt; during his arrest, he wounded a policeman with a knife. He was sentenced to life in prison on 23 August 2013.

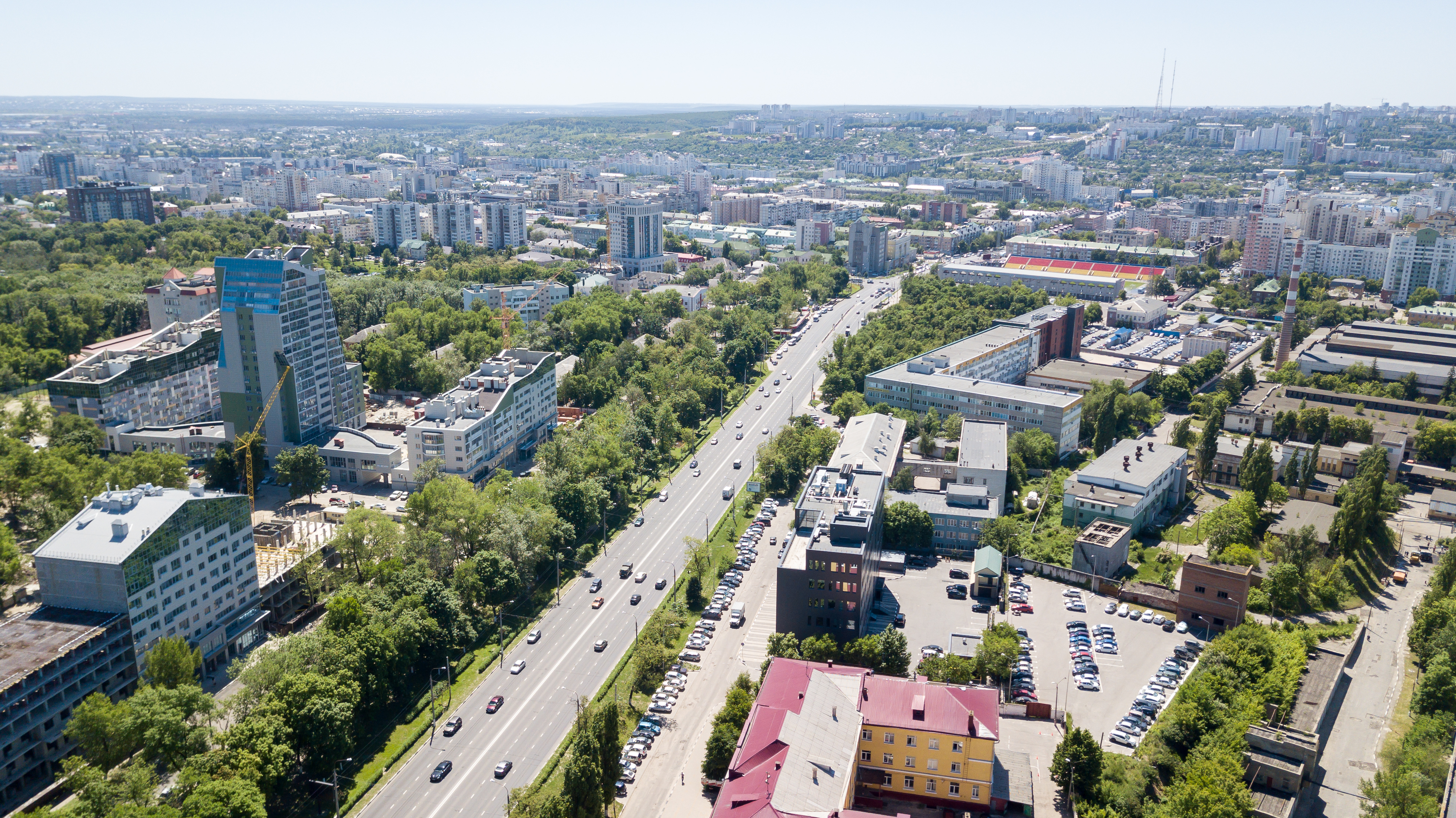
View of Belgorod in 2018

There were several attacks on Belgorod during the Russian invasion of Ukraine. Russian officials claimed that Belgorod was repeatedly targeted by indiscriminate Ukrainian attacks. On 1 April 2022, two Ukrainian Mi-24 performed a night raid and set fire to a fuel depot in Belgorod, in a low-altitude airstrike. On 20 April 2023, a Russian Su-34 fighter jet accidentally dropped a bomb on the city, leaving a crater 20 metres (66 ft) across and injuring two people. On 22 April, more than 3,000 people were evacuated from their homes after an undetonated explosive was found; it was not known if the second bomb had come from the same aircraft. On 30 December, an alleged Ukrainian airstrike killed 25 people and wounded over 100. In March 2024, authorities began evacuating 9,000 children from the city and wider region due to shelling and drone attacks. On 6 May, at least six people were killed following a Ukrainian drone strike. On 12 May 16 people were killed when a section of an apartment block collapsed. Russian MOD claimed it as a Ukrainian missile strike. CIT investigators said the building was most likely hit by a Russian bomb, as the explosion occurred on the North-Eastern side of the building, opposite to the border with Ukraine. On 28 September 2025, Ukraine's HIMARS struck the Belgorod thermal power plant, causing a "complete power outage" in Belgorod and surrounding areas.

== Administrative and municipal status ==
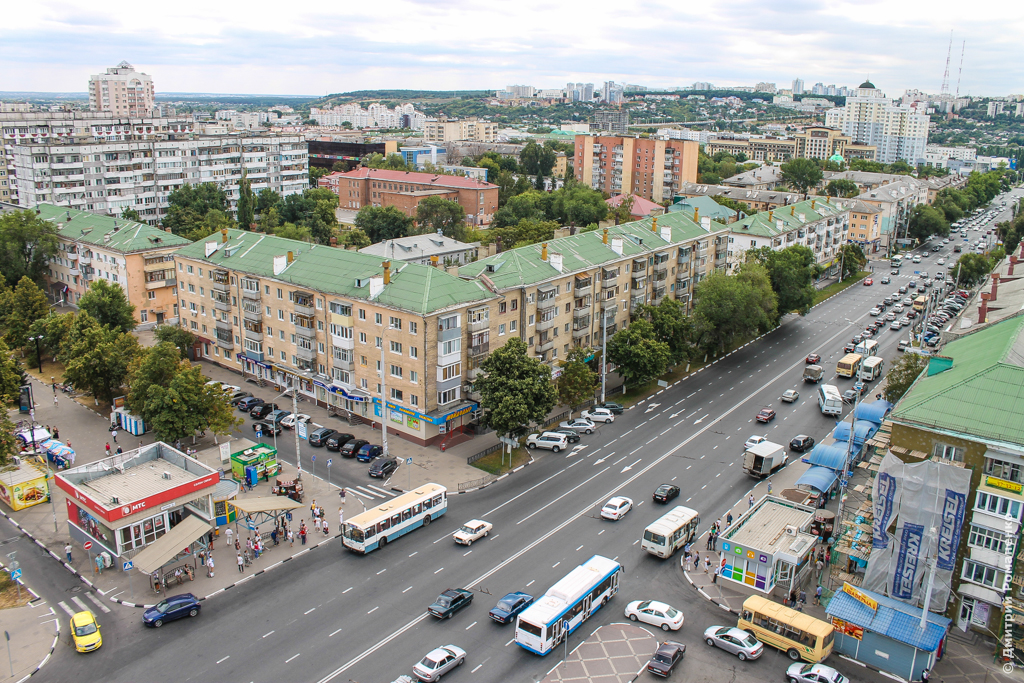
Bogdan Khmelnitsky Avenue in Belgorod

Belgorod is the administrative center of the oblast. Within the framework of administrative divisions, it is incorporated as the city of oblast significance of Belgorod—an administrative unit with status equal to that of the districts. As a municipal division, the city of oblast significance of Belgorod is incorporated as Belgorod Urban Okrug.

For administrative purposes, Belgorod is divided into two city okrugs:

- Vostochny ("Eastern"), population: 141,844 (2010 Census)
- Zapadny ("Western"), population: 214,558 (2010 Census)

== Transportation ==
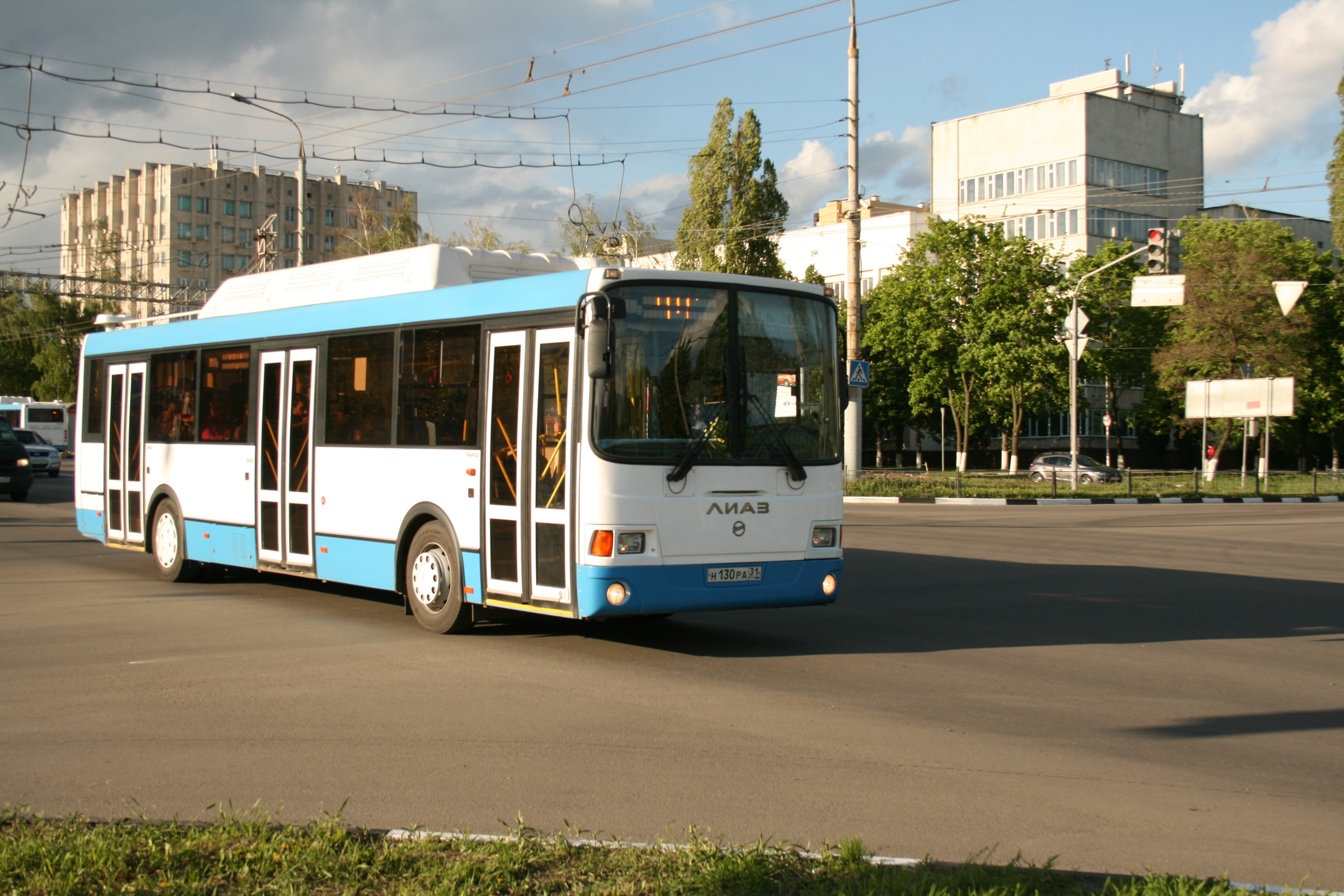
LiAZ-5293 CNG low-entry bus

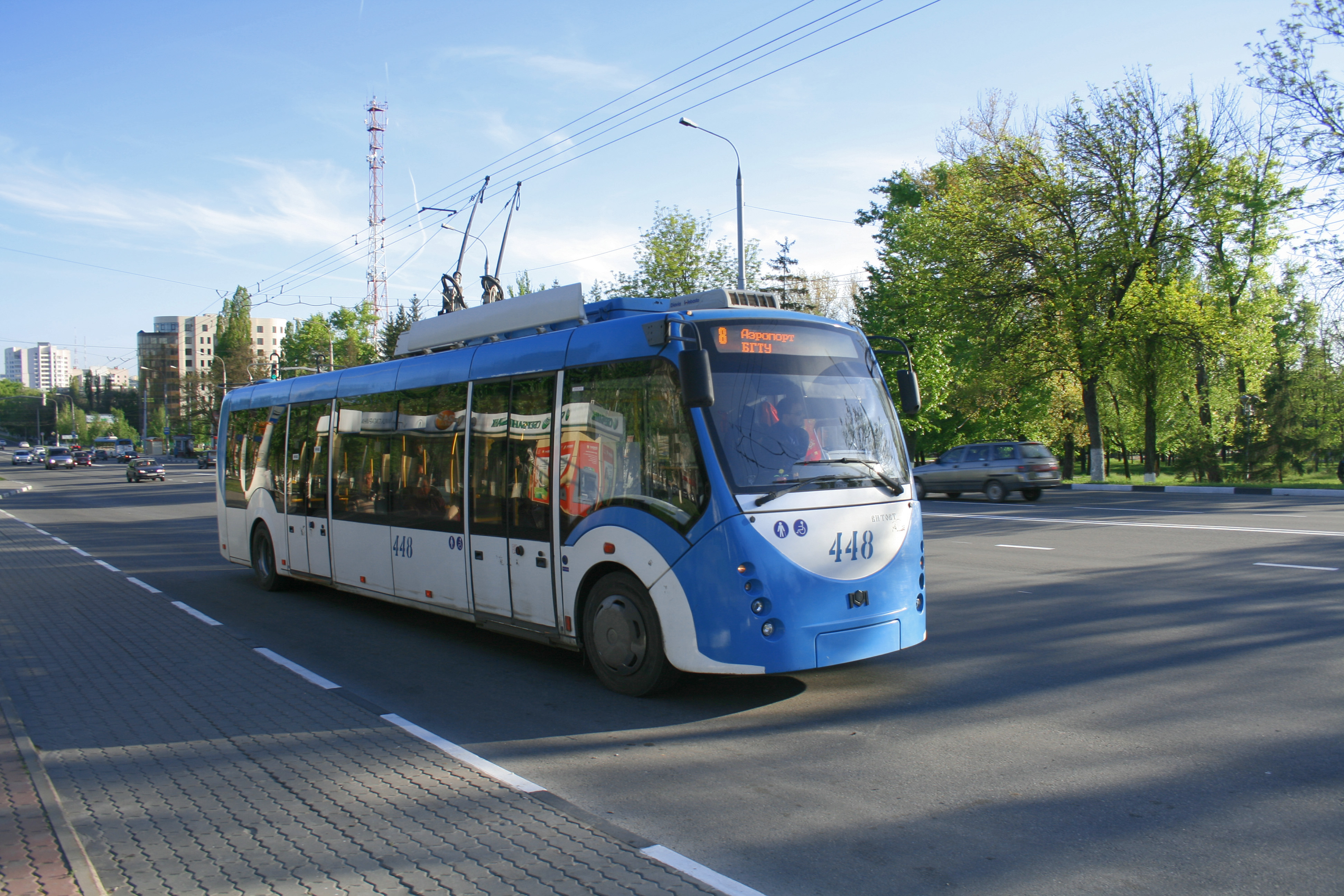
AKSM-420 Vitovt trolleybus

There has been a railway connection between Belgorod and Moscow since 1869. The city is served by Belgorod International Airport (EGO) in the north of the city.

There are two bus stations: Bus Belgorod, Belgorod- 2 Bus Terminal (located on the forecourt), and the bus stop complex Energomash. The Energomash bus station is mainly for commuter buses. Buses run from the Belgorod-2 station mainly to nearby regional centers, and depart in accordance with the arrival of trains.

Trolleybus services were discontinued on 30 June 2022 and replaced by diesel buses, despite public support for retention of the trolleybus system. The officially cited reason for the closure was inadequate condition of the overhead contact lines and insufficient funds for its modernization. The length of trolley lines was over 120 km (75 mi). Trolleybus city park consisted of 150 pieces of equipment, mainly Russian-made trolley ZiU-682V, 2 units ZiU-683, operated from 1990, and 3 units ZiU-6205, 30 units "Optima", and one trolley Skoda-VSW -14Tr, which started operation in 1996. The city administration purchased 15 new ZiU-682G trolleybuses in 2002, another 20 new ZiU-682Gs in 2005, 30 Trolza-5275.05 "Optima" trolleybuses in 2011, and 20 new ACSM-420 trolleybuses in 2013.

== Culture and art ==
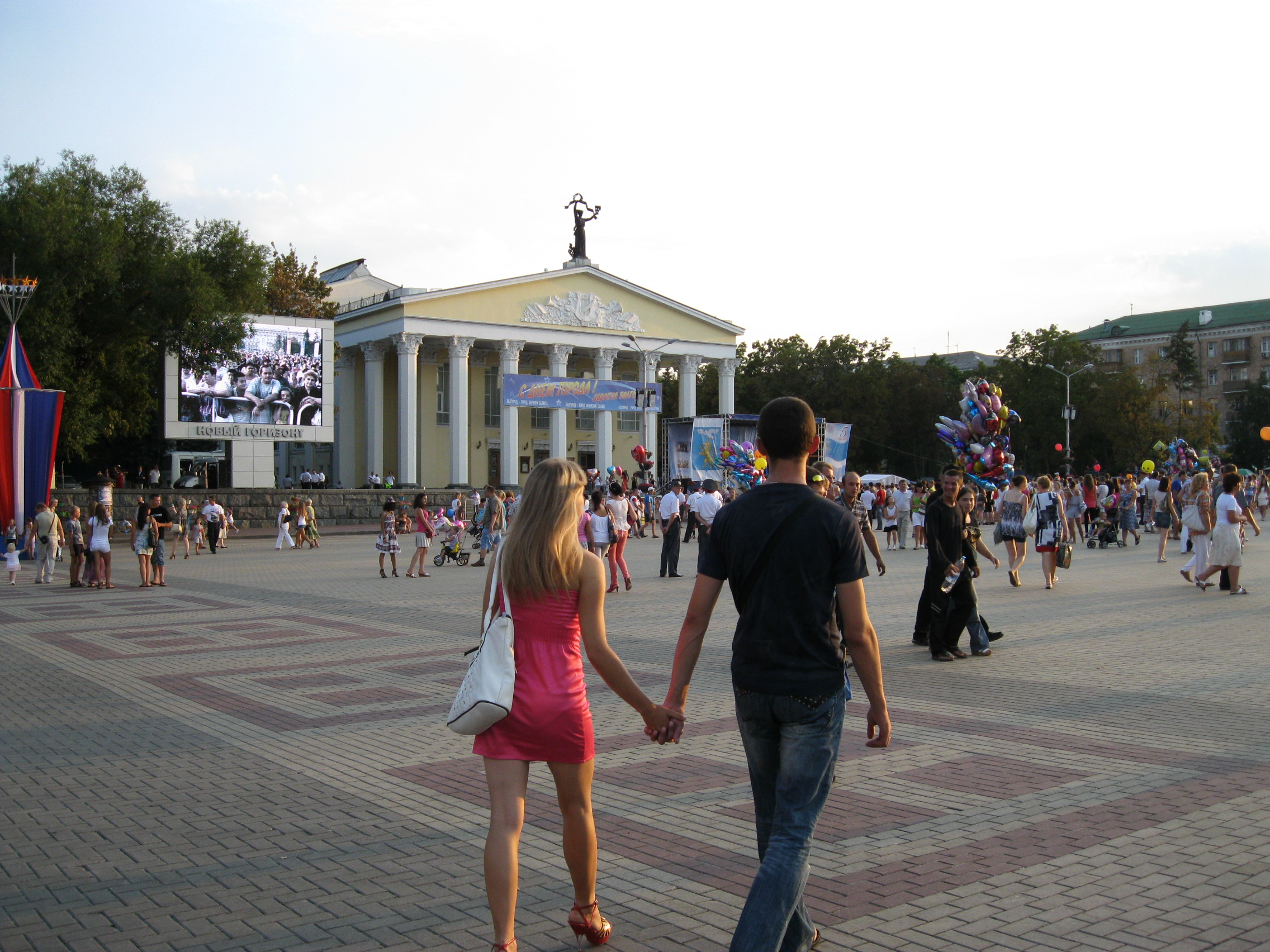
Belgorod Drama Theater

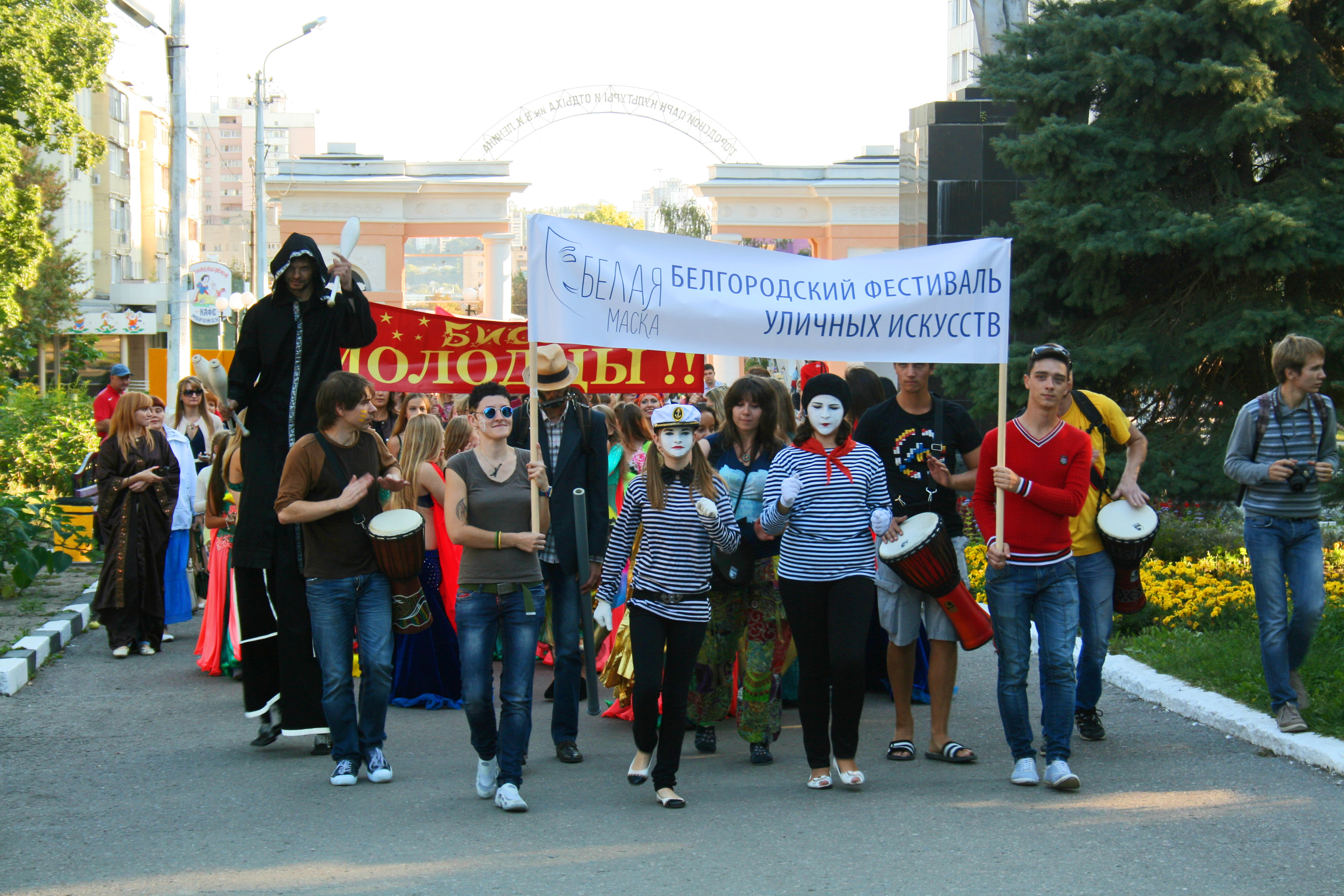
Street art festival in Belgorod

Theaters

- Belgorod Drama Theater
- Belgorod Puppet Theater
- Two monkeys, Belgorod clowning theater

Museums

- Belgorod historical museum
- Belgorod Art Museum
- Belgorod Museum of Folk Culture
- Belgorod Diorama of the Tank Battle of 1943

Festivals

- White mask, a festival of street arts

== Education ==
The major educational centers of the city are Belgorod State University, the Belgorod Technological University, the Belgorod Agrarian University, and the Financial Academy.

== Notable people ==
- Joasaph of Belgorod (1705–1754), 18th century bishop
- Viktoria Brezhneva (1907–1995), wife of Soviet leader Leonid Brezhnev
- Svetlana Khorkina (born 1979), Olympic gymnast
- Natalia Zuyeva (born 1988), Olympic rhythmic gymnast
- Alexey Shved (born 1988), basketball player
- Vadim Nemkov (born 1992), mixed martial artist
- Nikita Bedrin (born 2006), racing driver

== Twin towns – sister cities ==
Belgorod is twinned with:

- Herne, Germany
- Niš, Serbia
- / Sevastopol, Russia (de facto), Ukraine (de jure)
- / Yevpatoria, Russia (de facto), Ukraine (de jure)

Former twin town:

- Wakefield, United Kingdom. The tie was severed by the British city following the 2022 Russian invasion of Ukraine.
