= 2026 Belgorod Oblast gubernatorial election =

Regional legislative election in Russia

- 18–20 September 2026
- Turnout: 63.20% ▲4.63 pp
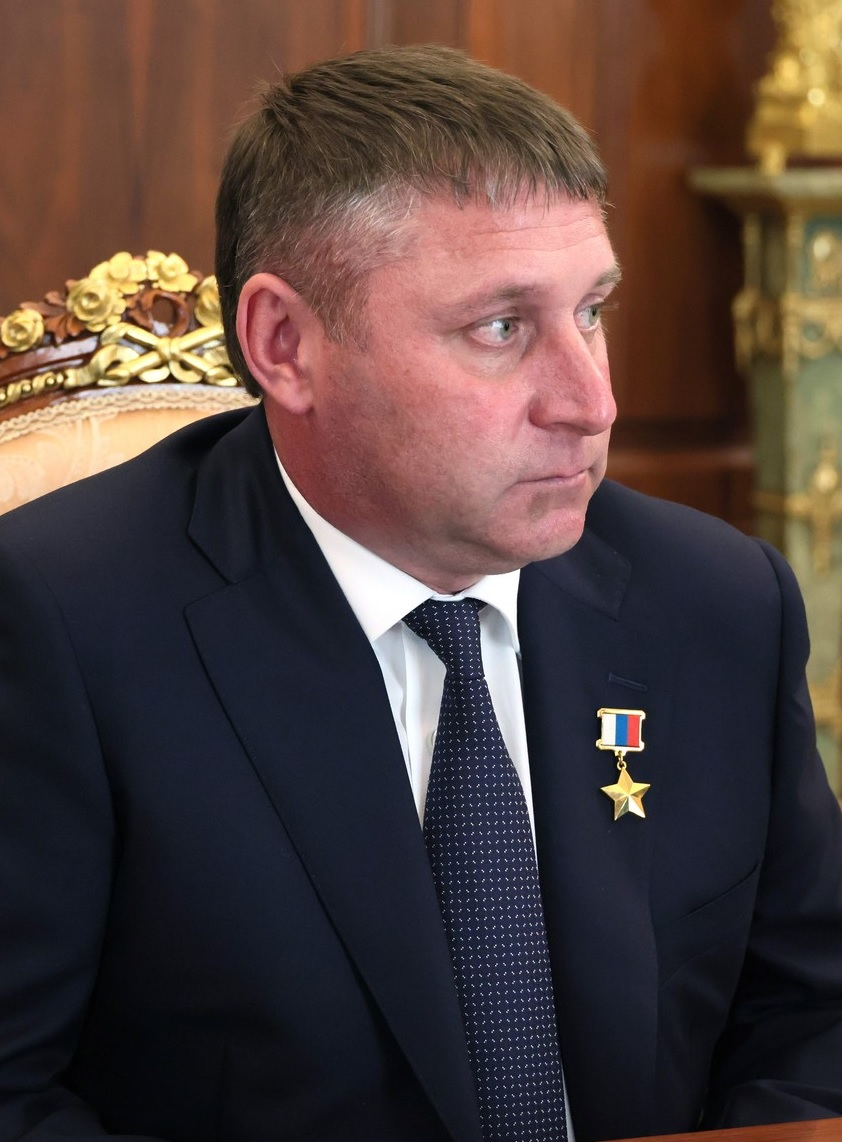

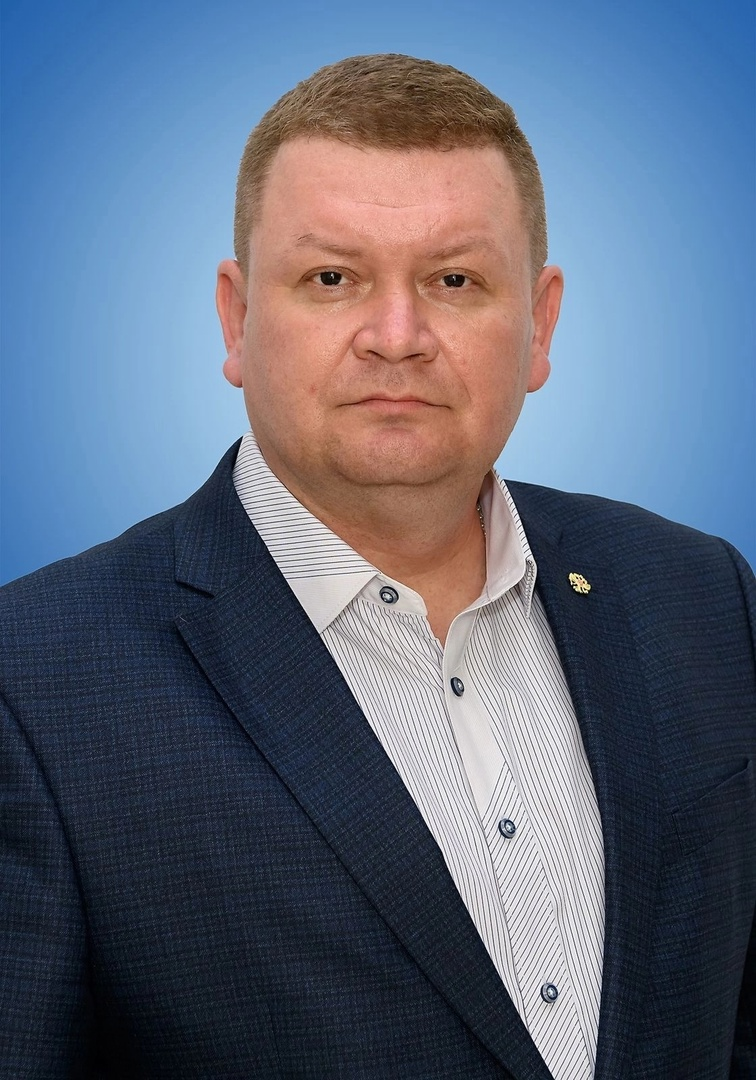
			CPRF
Candidate	Alexander Shuvaev	Yevgeny Dremov	Valery Shevlyakov
Party	United Russia	LDPR	CPRF
Popular vote	493,926	79,815	68,245
Percentage	65.97%	10.66%	9.12%
	RPPSS	SR
Candidate	Artyom Zotov	Vladimir Abelmazov
Party	Party of Pensioners	A Just Russia
Popular vote	56,504	38,700
Percentage	7.55%	5.17%
Governor before election
Alexander Shuvaev (acting)
United Russia
Governor-elect
Alexander Shuvaev
United Russia
Senator before election
Zhanna Chefranova
Independent
Senator after election
Aleksandr Lorenz
Independent

The 2026 Belgorod Oblast gubernatorial election took place on 18–20 September 2026, on common election day, to elect the Governor of Belgorod Oblast, coinciding with the 2026 Russian legislative election. Acting Governor Alexander Shuvaev was elected for a full term in office.

== Background ==
In September 2020 then-Governor of Belgorod Oblast Yevgeny Savchenko, the longest-serving Russian governor in history, who led the region since 1993, unexpectedly announced his resignation after he was elected to the Belgorod Oblast Duma and appointed to the Federation Council. After Savchenko's resignation First Deputy Governor Denis Butsayev became acting Governor, while the whole move was viewed to be orchestrated by Savchenko in order to appoint a preferred successor as Butsayev's position was created hours before the transition. The move apparently was not approved by the Presidential Administration because Butsayev was not formally appointed acting governor. In November 2020 President of Russia Vladimir Putin appointed Deputy Chairman of the Government of Stavropol Krai Vyacheslav Gladkov as acting Governor of Belgorod Oblast, replacing Butsayev. Gladkov easily won the election for a full term in September 2021 with 78.79% of the vote.

Following the start of the Russo-Ukrainian war (2022–present) Belgorod Oblast, which is situated on the border with Ukraine, suffered significantly from the conflict, including deadly UAV and missile strikes as well as incursuions. Due to constant attacks some residents of western Belgorod Oblast districts were evacuated. In these circumstances Gladkov's profile was elevated to the national level, while his management and communication skills in the war-torn region were widely touted. Gladkov's high profile even led to rumours about his appointment as Head of the Presidential Office for Domestic Policy following the 2024 presidential election, however, Gladkov remained in his position as Governor of Belgorod Oblast.

In the regional elite dynamics a major turmoil occurred in March 2022 when Senator Savchenko published his memoirs where he openly admitted to speaking with ghosts through a physic and worshipping an entity called "Monoston". Following the controversial memoirs release and subsequent condemnation, Savchenko's confidants – Belgorod Oblast Duma speaker Olga Pavlova and her deputies Yelena Bondarenko and Valery Sergachyov – resigned from the chamber, while Savchenko himself left Federation Council in June 2024. As the result of Savchenko's downfall Gladkov was able to consolidate power in the region, eliminating the network of his predecessor. In June 2025, Deputy Governor of Belgorod Oblast Rustem Zainullin was arrested for embezzlement in the fortification construction, which was seen as a blow to Gladkov. In August 2025 acting Deputy Governor of Kursk Oblast Vladimir Bazarov was also arrested for embezzlement in the fortification construction during his time as Deputy Governor of Belgorod Oblast in 2020–2025.

In March 2026 governor Gladkov asked political parties and candidates to refrain from campaigning in the upcoming gubernatorial and State Duma elections due to security concerns. In April 2026 Vedomosti reported that Vyacheslav Gladkov could resign from his position due to health issues and deteriorating quality of life in the region, despite governor's good personal ratings; Gladkov would presumably be appointed Deputy Minister of Economic Development of Russia or Russian Ambassador to Abkhazia. Several sources reported Hero of Russia major general Alexander Shuvaev, Deputy Governor of Irkutsk Oblast since January 2026, to be the frontrunner for the position of acting Governor of Belgorod Oblast.

Amid resignation rumours Governor Gladkov took leave in April 2026 for two weeks, later extending it for another two weeks. On May 13, 2026, Gladkov submitted his resignation to President Putin which the latter accepted. Putin appointed Deputy Governor of Irkutsk Oblast Alexander Shuvaev as acting Governor of Belgorod Oblast. In late June 2026 Gladkov was appointed Russian Ambassador to Abkhazia.

== Candidates ==
In Belgorod Oblast candidates for governor of Belgorod Oblast can be nominated only by registered political parties. A candidate for Governor of Belgorod Oblast should be a Russian citizen and at least 30 years old. Candidates for Governor of Belgorod Oblast should not have a foreign citizenship or residence permit. Each candidate in order to be registered is required to collect at least 5% of the signatures of municipal deputies and heads of municipalities. Also gubernatorial candidates present 3 candidacies to the Federation Council and election winner later appoints one of the presented candidates.

=== Declared candidates ===
Candidate name, political party	Occupation	Status	Ref.
Vladimir Abelmazov; A Just Russia	Former Member of Belgorod Oblast Duma (2020–2025); 2021 RPPSS gubernatorial candidate	Registered	
Yevgeny Dremov; Liberal Democratic Party	Member of Belgorod Oblast Duma (2025–present); Aide to State Duma member Ivan Musatov; 2021 gubernatorial candidate	Registered	
Valery Shevlyakov; Communist Party	Member of Belgorod Oblast Duma (2010–present)	Registered	
Alexander Shuvaev; United Russia	Acting Governor of Belgorod Oblast (2026–present); Former Deputy Governor of Irkutsk Oblast (2026)	Registered	
Artyom Zotov; Party of Pensioners	Member of Belgorod City Council (2023–present); Property management businessman	Registered	
Sergey Yeskov; Rodina	Chairman of the party regional office	Withdrew	

=== Eliminated in the primary ===
- Vadim Radchenko (United Russia), Chairman of the Belgorod City Council (2022–present), Member of the City Council (2013–present)

=== Candidates for Federation Council ===
Incumbent Senator Zhanna Chefranova (Independent) was not re-nominated.

Gubernatorial candidate, political party	Candidates for Federation Council	Status
Vladimir Abelmazov; A Just Russia	* Oleg Korchagin, Member of Stary Oskol Council of Deputies (2017–present), nonprofit director * Sergey Milshin, party official * Vladimir Zatsepin, community activist	Registered
Yevgeny Dremov; Liberal Democratic Party	* Konstantin Klimashevsky, former Member of Belgorod City Council (2018–2023), 2017 gubernatorial candidate * Andrey Koltykov, Member of Belgorodsky District Council (2025–present), attorney * Ilya Komarov, Member of Ivnyansky District Council (2025–present), communication lab head	Registered
Valery Shevlyakov; Communist Party	* Artyom Akhadov, Member of Stary Oskol Council of Deputies (2022–present), medical centre director * Member of Krasnogvardeysky District Council (2025–present), accountant * Yury Shashnin, Member of Belgorod Oblast Duma (2025–present)	Registered
Alexander Shuvaev; United Russia	* Aleksandr Lorenz, Deputy Governor of Belgorod Oblast – Chief of Staff to the Governor (2024–present) * Natalia Poluyanova, Member of State Duma (2021–present) * Valery Skrug, Member of State Duma (2011, 2016–present)	Registered
Artyom Zotov; Party of Pensioners	* Yelena Petrova, accountant * Nikita Povetkin, IT specialist * Natalya Tsyguleva, accountant	Registered

== Finances ==
All sums are in rubles.

Financial Report	Source	Abelmazov	Dremov	Shevlyakov	Shuvayev	Zotov
First		60,000	120,000	1,040,000	20,400,000	TBA
Final		TBD	120,000	1,040,000	40,400,000	TBD

== Results ==
Summary of the 18–20 September 2026 Belgorod Oblast gubernatorial election results
Candidate	Party	Votes	%
Alexander Shuvaev (incumbent)	United Russia	493,926	65.97
Yevgeny Dremov	Liberal Democratic Party	79,815	10.66
Valery Shevlyakov	Communist Party	68,245	9.12
Artyom Zotov	Party of Pensioners	56,504	7.55
Vladimir Abelmazov	A Just Russia	38,700	5.17
Valid votes		737,190	98.47
Blank ballots		11,483	1.53%
Total		748,673	100.00
Turnout		748,673	63.20
Registered voters		1,184,547	100.00

Governor Shuvaev appointed Deputy Governor Aleksandr Lorenz (Independent) to the Federation Council, replacing incumbent Senator Zhanna Chefranova (Independent).

== See also ==
- 2026 Russian regional elections
