= 2021 Belgorod Oblast gubernatorial election =

- 17–19 September 2021
- Turnout: 58.57%
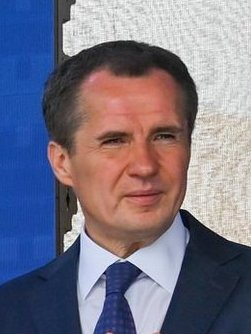
		CPRF
Candidate	Vyacheslav Gladkov	Kirill Skachko
Party	United Russia	CPRF
Popular vote	566,353	71,430
Percentage	78.79%	9.94%
Governor before election
Vyacheslav Gladkov
United Russia
Elected Governor
Vyacheslav Gladkov
United Russia

The 2021 Belgorod Oblast gubernatorial election took place on 17–19 September 2021, on common election day, coinciding with election to the State Duma. Acting Governor Vyacheslav Gladkov was elected for his first full term.

== Background ==
On 22 September 2020 longtime Governor Yevgeny Savchenko was elected to the Federation Council by the Belgorod Oblast Duma. He resigned from the governorship which he held from 1993 being the longest-serving Russian Governor. He won his last gubernatorial election in 2017 with 69.29% of the vote.

After Savchenko's resignation First Vice Governor Denis Butsayev became acting Governor of Belgorod Oblast. Butsayev's position of First Vice Governor was created several hours before Savchenko announced his resignation with the sole intent of Butsayev to take the governorship. However, Denis Butsayev was not confirmed as acting Governor by the President, which created speculations about appointment of another acting Governor. Among the considered candidates was federal Minister of Transport Yevgeny Dietrich (he left the Russian Government on 9 November). On 18 November 2020 President Vladimir Putin appointed Vice Governor of Stavropol Krai Vyacheslav Gladkov as acting Governor of Belgorod Oblast. Gladkov previously held the positions of Vice Governor of Sevastopol (2016–2018) and Mayor of ZATO Zarechny (2009–2016).

It was reported that incumbent Senator from Belgorod Oblast and former Soviet Premier (1985–1991) Nikolay Ryzhkov won't be re-appointed to the Federation Council, however, he was nominated to the Federation Council by Vyacheslav Gladkov and later re-appointed.

== Candidates ==
Only political parties can nominate candidates for gubernatorial election in Belgorod Oblast, self-nomination is not possible. However, candidate is not obliged to be a member of the nominating party. Candidate for Governor of Belgorod Oblast should be a Russian citizen and at least 30 years old. Candidates for Governor should not have a foreign citizenship or residence permit. Each candidate to be registered is required to collect at least 5% of signatures of members and heads of municipalities (106–111 signatures). Also gubernatorial candidates present 3 candidacies to the Federation Council and election winner later appoints one of the presented candidates.

=== Registered candidates ===
- Vladimir Abelmazov (RPPSS), Member of Belgorod Oblast Duma
- Vyacheslav Gladkov (United Russia), acting Governor of Belgorod Oblast, former Vice Governor of Stavropol Krai (2018–2020)
- Yevgeny Dremov (LDPR), aide to State Duma member Aleksandr Starovoytov
- Yury Osetrov (SR-ZP), former Member of Belgorod Oblast Duma (2015–2020)
- Kirill Skachko (CPRF), Member of Belgorod City Council

=== Candidates for the Federation Council ===
- Vladimir Abelmazov (RPPSS):
  - Vladimir Denisov, lawyer
  - Vladimir Zatsepin, pensioner
  - Sergey Milshin, "Burovik Gazproma" correspondent
- Vyacheslav Gladkov (United Russia):
  - Olga Pavlova, Speaker of the Belgorod Oblast Duma
  - Nikolay Ryzhkov, incumbent Senator of the Federation Council
  - Aleksandr Shumeyko, Member of Belgorod Oblast Duma
- Yevgeny Dremov (LDPR):
  - Sergey Barinov, coordinator of the LDPR Belgorod regional office
  - Konstantin Klimashevsky, Member of Belgorod Oblast Duma, 2017 gubernatorial candidate
  - Maksim Malyutin, director of LLP "NEFTEKHIM-Komplekt"
- Yury Osetrov (SR-ZP):
  - Yury Vorobyev, director of private security company "Okhrannaya Sluzhba Bezopasnosti"
  - Oleg Korchagin, member of Stary Oskol Council of Deputies
  - Oksana Kuryambina, chief accountant at CJSC "AspektTsentr"
- Kirill Skachko (CPRF):
  - Stanislav Panov, Member of Belgorod Oblast Duma, first secretary of the CPRF Belgorod Oblast Committee
  - Sergey Chumakov, general director of LLP "Transavtomatizatsiya"
  - Valery Shevlyakov, Member of Belgorod Oblast Duma

== Finances ==
All sums are in rubles.

Financial Report	Source	Abelmazov	Gladkov	Dremov	Osetrov	Skachko
First		165,000	80,250,000	450,000	740,000	590,000
Final		587,500	92,890,000	1,150,000	1,490,029	871,344

== Results ==
Summary of the 17–19 September 2021 Belgorod Oblast gubernatorial election results
Candidate	Party	Votes	%
Vyacheslav Gladkov (incumbent)	United Russia	566,353	78.79
Kirill Skachko	Communist Party	71,430	9.94
Yury Osetrov	A Just Russia – For Truth	27,101	3.77
Yevgeny Dremov	Liberal Democratic Party	20,899	2.91
Vladimir Abelmazov	Party of Pensioners	20,828	2.90
Valid votes		706,611	98.30
Blank ballots		12,232	1.70
Total		718,843	100.00
Turnout		718,843	58.57
Registered voters		1,227,252	100.00

Incumbent Senator Nikolay Ryzhkov (Independent) was re-appointed to the Federation Council.
