= Zhanna Chefranova =

Russian politician (born 1968)

- Жанна Чефранова
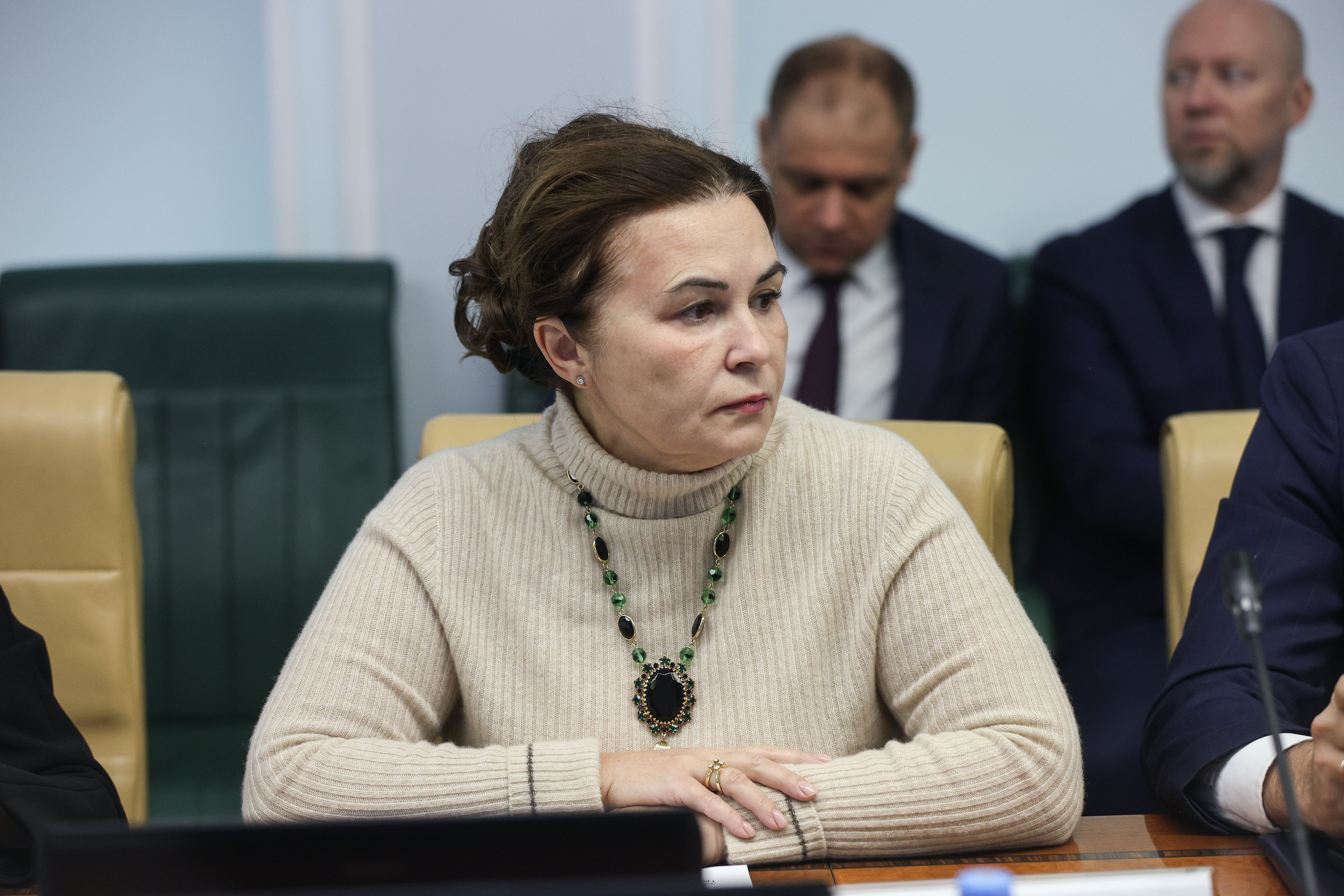
- Chefranova in 2023

Senator from Belgorod Oblast
- Incumbent
- Assumed office 25 September 2025
- Preceded by: Nikolai Ryzhkov

Personal details
- Born: 10 August 1978 (age 48) Belomestnoye, Russian SFSR, Soviet Union
- Party: United Russia

Zhanna Yuryevna Chefranova (Russian: Жанна Юрьевна Чефранова; born 5 July 1968) is a Russian politician, senator of the Federation Council, and First Deputy Chair of the Federation Council Committee on Social Policy (since 2024). Doctor of Medical Sciences. She is Honoured Doctor of the Russian Federation (2018).

== Biography ==
In 2005, she published the monograph "Idiopathic Arterial Hypotension. Clinical Features. Diagnostics. Treatment" with the publishing house "Medicine". She has authored over 30 publications, developed and published methodological recommendations for physicians, and published two monographs.

=== Federation Council ===
On 10 September 2023, she was elected as a deputy of the Belgorod Regional Duma of the 7th convocation in the by-election for Grayvoronsky single-mandate electoral district No. 12. She ran as a candidate for the United Russia party. She received 70.43% of the vote.

Since October 2023, she has been a Senator of the Federation Council representing the executive branch of the Belgorod Oblast in the Federation Council of Russia. On 9 October 2023, Governor of Belgorod Oblast, Vyacheslav Gladkov granted Zhanna Chefranova the corresponding powers of a senator. She joined the Committee on Social Policy. At the 577th meeting of the Federation Council in October 2024, she was elected First Deputy Chair of the Federation Council Committee on Social Policy.

She replaced Nikolai Ryzhkov, who resigned early as a senator.
