= Viktor Berestovoy =

Russian politician

- Виктор Берестовой
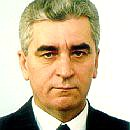
- Berestovoy in 1993

Chairman of the State Committee of Russia for Ensuring Monopoly on Alcoholic Products
- In office 10 January 1998 – July 1998

Head of the Federal Service of Russia for Ensuring the State Monopoly on Alcoholic Products
- In office February 1997 – 10 January 1998

Member of the State Duma
- In office 12 December 1993 – 16 January 1996

1st Governor (Head) of Belgorod Oblast
- In office 30 November 1991 – 11 October 1993
- Preceded by: Office established
- Succeeded by: Yevgeny Savchenko

Chairman of the Executive Committee of the Belgorod Regional Council
- In office April 1990 – 30 November 1991
- Preceded by: Nikolai Shevchenko
- Succeeded by: position abolished

Chairman of the Belgorod Regional Council
- In office July 1991 – 30 November 1991
- Preceded by: Aleksey Ponomaryov
- Succeeded by: Mikhail Beskhmelnitsyn

Second Secretary of the Belgorod Regional Committee of the CPSU
- In office 1988 – August 1991
- Preceded by: Viktor Ilin

Personal details
- Born: Viktor Ivanovich Berestovoy; 9 May 1948 (age 77); Garbuzovo, Russian SFSR, Soviet Union
- Children: 2 sons

Viktor Ivanovich Berestovoy (Russian: Виктор Иванович Берестовой; born on 9 May 1948), is a Russian politician and statesman who was the first Governor of Belgorod Oblast from 1991 to 1993. Berestovoy was a member of parliament of the State Duma from 1993 to 1996.

He was also a Deputy Chairman of the Central Bank of Russia from May 2003 to June 2018.

== Biography ==
Viktor Berestovoy was born into the family of a collective farmer on 9 May 1948 in the village of Garbuzovo, Alexeyevsky District, Voronezh Oblast. Alexeyevsky District was later transferred to Belgorod Oblast.

=== Education and work ===
Berestovoy graduated from the Novy Oskol state farm-technical school in 1967, the Voronezh Agricultural Institute named after KD Glinka with a degree in agricultural mechanical engineering in 1972, and in graduate school, with the Rostov Higher Party School.

Berestovoy began his career in 1967 as the head of a car maintenance station in the Rakityanskiy regional association "Selkhoztekhnika", in Belgorod Oblast. In 1972 he worked as a freed secretary of the Komsomol committee of the Voronezh Agricultural Institute. From 1972 to 1973 he served in the Soviet Army. Between 1973 and 1977, he was the chief engineer of the collective farm "40 years of October". In 1976, he joined the Communist Party of the Soviet Union.

From 1977 to 1979, Berestovoy was the deputy chairman of the Pobeda collective farm. From 1979 to 1981, he was promoted as the chairman of the 40 years of October collective farm in the Alekseyevsky District of Belgorod Oblast. From 1981 to 1983, he was the head of the Alekseyevsky regional department of agriculture.

=== Political activity ===
From 1983 to 1988, Berestovoy was the First Secretary of the Alexeyevka City Committee of the CPSU. From 1988 to 1991, he was the second secretary of the Belgorod Regional Committee of the CPSU. From 1990 to 1991, he was the Chairman of the Executive Committee of the Belgorod Regional Council of People's Deputies; simultaneously from July to November 1991, he was the Chairman of the Belgorod Regional Council of People's Deputies. Berestovoy was elected People's Deputy of Russia, and was a member of the "Communists of Russia" faction.

In August 1991, Berestovoy opposed the State Committee on the State of Emergency and left the CPSU. On 30 November 1991, Berestovoy became the first Governor (Head) of Belgorod Oblast. In September 1993, he opposed the dispersal of the Supreme Soviet of Russia and supported the Congress of People's Deputies of Russia, and also objected to the decision of Boris Yeltsin on the dissolution of the Supreme Soviet and decree No. 1400 "On gradual constitutional reform in the Russian Federation." On 11 October 1993, Berestovoy was removed from the post of Governor of Belgorod Oblast for failure to comply with presidential decrees and government orders, for obstructing the exercise of electoral rights of citizens.

On 12 December 1993, Berestovoy was elected a member of the State Duma of the first convocation, was a member of the Agrarian Party of Russia faction and the deputy group "Russian Way", was the deputy chairman of the committee for organizing the work of the State Duma, and a member of the commission on deputy ethics. From 1996 to 1997, he was the head of the inspection of the Accounts Chamber of Russia for control over the expenditure of federal budget funds in industry and energy. In February 1997, he was the head of the Federal Service of Russia for ensuring the state monopoly on alcoholic beverages.

From January to July 1998, Berestovoy was the Chairman of the State Committee of the Russian Federation for Ensuring Monopoly on Alcoholic Products. Since July 1998, he worked as Deputy Head of the State Tax Service of Russia, as Head of the Department for Ensuring the State Monopoly on Alcoholic Products and Tax Revenues in that Area. He was the State Counselor of the Tax Service (11.9.1998). From March 1999 to May 2003, he was the Deputy Minister of the Russian Federation for Taxes and Levies. Since May 2003, he was appointed Deputy Chairman of the Central Bank. In this position, he was in charge of administrative and economic activities. He retired in June 2018.
