= 2025 Belgorod Oblast legislative election =

Regional legislative election in Russia

← 2020	12–14 September 2025	2030 →

All 50 seats in the Oblast Duma 26 seats needed for a majority
- Turnout: 59.04% ▲4.56 pp
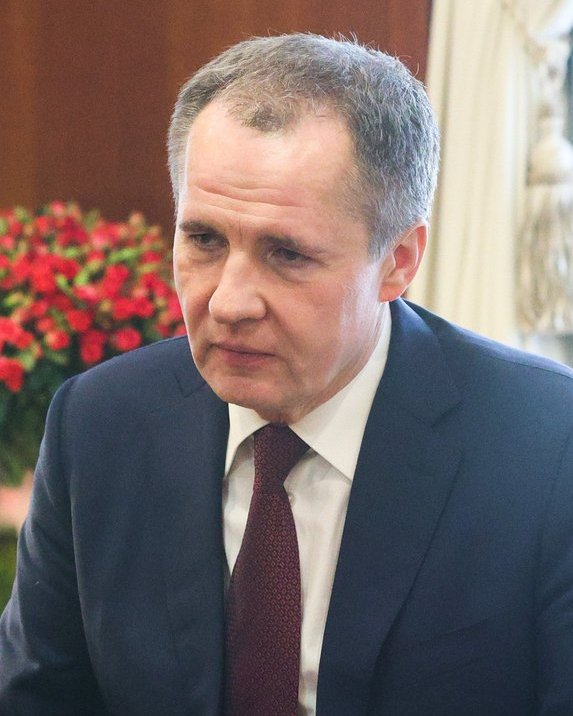

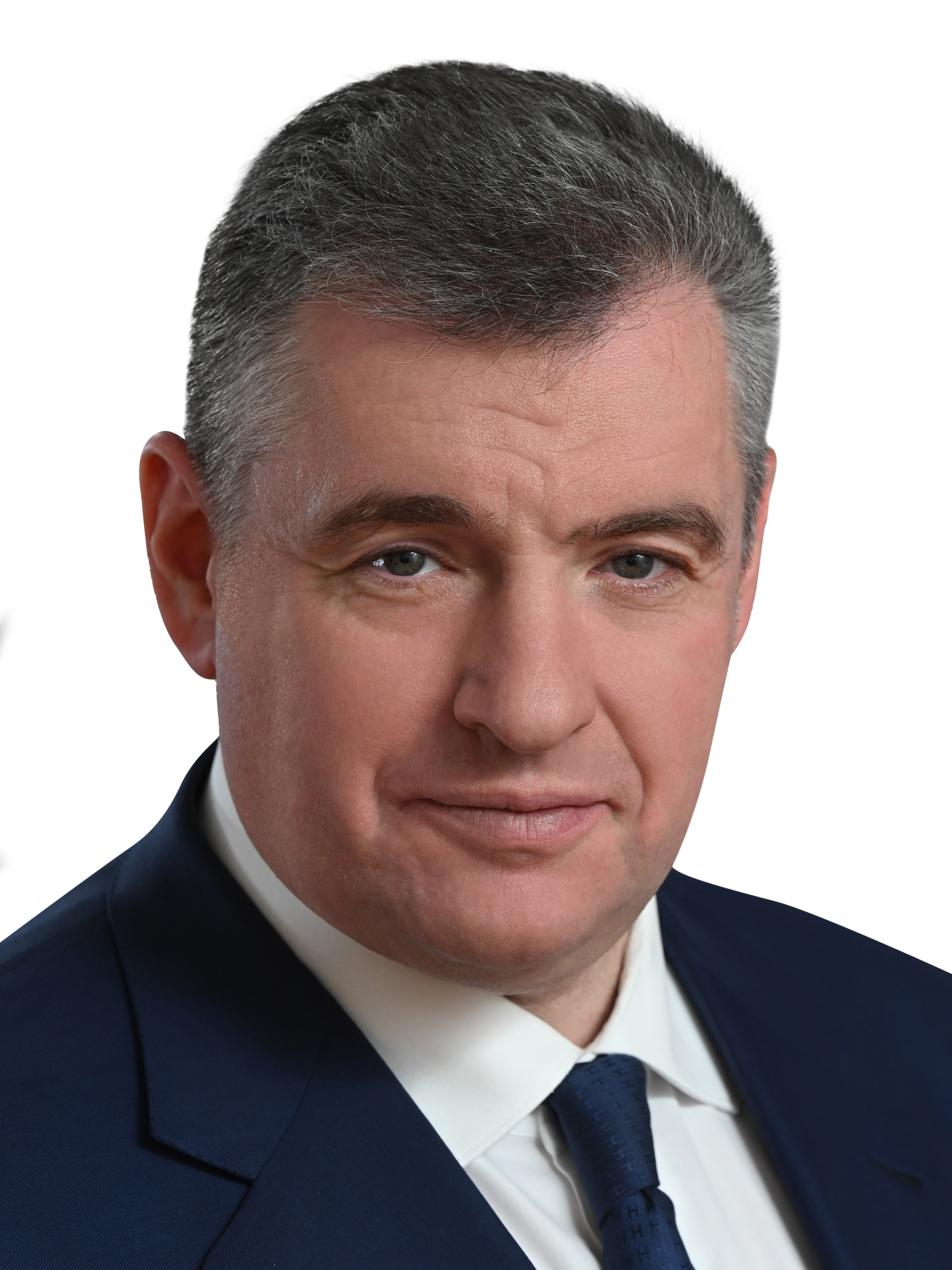
	Majority party	Minority party	Third party
			CPRF
Candidate	Vyacheslav Gladkov	Leonid Slutsky	Valery Shevlyakov
Party	United Russia	LDPR	CPRF
Last election	63.95%, 44 seats	6.58%, 1 seat	13.20%, 4 seats
Seats won	46	2	2
Seat change	▲2	▲1	▼2
Popular vote	515,364	64,866	57,061
Percentage	72.98%	9.19%	8.08%
Swing	▲9.03 pp	▲2.61 pp	▼5.12 pp
	Fourth party	Fifth party	Sixth party
	SR–ZP	RPPSS	CPCR
Candidate	Yury Osetrov	Tatyana Shagiyeva	Ivan Borodavkin
Party	SR–ZP	Party of Pensioners	Communists of Russia
Last election	3.82%, 0 seats	5.11%, 1 seat	Did not participate
Seats won	0	0	0
Seat change	Steady	▼1	Did not participate
Popular vote	27,921	24,009	9,600
Percentage	3.95%	3.40%	1.36%
Swing	▲0.13 pp	▼1.71 pp	Did not participate
Chairman before election
Yury Klepikov
United Russia
Elected Chairman
Yury Klepikov
United Russia

The 2025 Belgorod Oblast Duma election took place on 12–14 September 2025, on common election day. All 50 seats in the Oblast Duma were up for re-election.

United Russia increased its already overwhelming majority in the Oblast Duma, winning 73% of the vote and all 25 single-mandate constituencies. Liberal Democratic Party of Russia slightly increased its vote share and doubled its faction (from one to two). Communist Party of the Russian Federation suffered heavy losses and lost two deputies, while Russian Party of Pensioners for Social Justice failed to cross the threshold and lost its faction.

== Electoral system ==
Under current election laws, the Oblast Duma is elected for a term of five years, with parallel voting. 25 seats are elected by party-list proportional representation with a 5% electoral threshold, with the other half elected in 25 single-member constituencies by first-past-the-post voting. Seats in the proportional part are allocated using the Imperiali quota, modified to ensure that every party list, which passes the threshold, receives at least one mandate.

== Candidates ==
=== Party lists ===
To register regional lists of candidates, parties need to collect 0.5% of signatures of all registered voters in Belgorod Oblast.

The following parties were relieved from the necessity to collect signatures:

- United Russia
- Communist Party of the Russian Federation
- Liberal Democratic Party of Russia
- A Just Russia — Patriots — For Truth
- New People
- Russian Party of Pensioners for Social Justice
- Communists of Russia
- Cossack Party of the Russian Federation

№	Party	Oblast-wide list	Candidates	Territorial groups	Status
1	United Russia	Vyacheslav Gladkov • Vyacheslav Vorobyov • Anna Kocherova	51	12	Registered
2	Communist Party	Valery Shevlyakov	50	12	Registered
3	Party of Pensioners	Tatyana Shagiyeva • Vladimir Vorozhtsov • Artyom Zotov	21	6	Registered
4	Liberal Democratic Party	Leonid Slutsky • Yevgeny Dremov	54	12	Registered
5	Communists of Russia	Ivan Borodavkin • Ilya Kleymyonov • Konstantin Khlebnikov	62	12	Registered
6	A Just Russia – For Truth	Yury Osetrov	46	9	Registered

Communists of Russia returned after last participating in the 2015 election, while For Truth and Patriots of Russia, who took part in the 2020 election, both merged with A Just Russia in 2021.

=== Single-mandate constituencies ===
25 single-mandate constituencies were formed in Belgorod Oblast. To register candidates in single-mandate constituencies need to collect 3% of signatures of registered voters in the constituency.

Number of candidates in single-mandate constituencies
Party	Candidates	
Party	Nominated	Registered
United Russia	25	25
Communist Party	23	23
Liberal Democratic Party	23	23
Party of Pensioners	12	12
A Just Russia – For Truth	13	13
Independent	3	1
Total	99	97

== Results ==
=== Results by party lists ===
Summary of the 12–14 September 2025 Belgorod Oblast Duma election results
Party	Party list					Constituency		Total	
Party	Votes	%	±pp	Seats	+/–	Seats	+/–	Seats	+/–
United Russia	515,364	72.98	▲9.03	21	▲2	25	Steady	46	▲2
Liberal Democratic Party	64,866	9.19	▲2.61	2	▲1	0	Steady	2	▲1
Communist Party	57,061	8.08	▼5.12	2	▼2	0	Steady	2	▼2
A Just Russia — For Truth	27,921	3.95	▲0.13	0	Steady	0	Steady	0	Steady
Party of Pensioners	24,009	3.40	▼1.71	0	▼1	0	Steady	0	▼1
Communists of Russia	9,600	1.36	New	0	New	–	–	0	New
Independent	–	–	–	–	–	0	Steady	0	Steady
Invalid ballots	7,379	1.04	▼0.99	—	—	—	—	—	—
Total	706,200	100.00	—	25	Steady	25	Steady	50	Steady
Turnout	706,200	59.04	▲4.56	—	—	—	—	—	—
Registered voters	1,196,142	100.00	—	—	—	—	—	—	—

Yury Klepikov (United Russia) was re-elected as Chairman of the Oblast Duma, while Defenders of the Fatherland foundation regional director Anna Kocherova (United Russia) was appointed to the Federation Council, replacing incumbent Senator Taras Khtey (United Russia), who lost re-election to the Oblast Duma.

=== Results in single-member constituencies ===
==== District 1 ====
Summary of the 12–14 September 2025 Belgorod Oblast Duma election in Alekseyevsky constituency No.1
Candidate	Party	Votes	%
Mikhail Litovkin (incumbent)	United Russia	36,015	83.33%
Aleksey Pleshkov	A Just Russia – For Truth	3,165	7.32%
Vladislav Kuznetsov	Communist Party	2,592	6.00%
Yevgeny Dremov	Liberal Democratic Party	1,388	3.21%
Total		43,220	100%

==== District 2 ====
Summary of the 12–14 September 2025 Belgorod Oblast Duma election in Belgorodsky urban constituency No.2
Candidate	Party	Votes	%
Roman Protsenko	United Russia	8,471	59.44%
Sergey Uvarov	Liberal Democratic Party	1,933	13.56%
Igor Dzhepa	Communist Party	1,752	12.29%
Dmitry Rudov	A Just Russia – For Truth	1,714	12.03%
Total		14,252	100%

==== District 3 ====
Summary of the 12–14 September 2025 Belgorod Oblast Duma election in Belgorodsky urban constituency No.3
Candidate	Party	Votes	%
Lyubov Kireyeva (incumbent)	United Russia	10,863	64.01%
Irina Gukova	Communist Party	2,538	14.95%
Vyacheslav Mironov	Liberal Democratic Party	2,312	13.62%
Veronika Parshukova	A Just Russia – For Truth	972	5.73%
Total		16,971	100%

==== District 4 ====
Summary of the 12–14 September 2025 Belgorod Oblast Duma election in Belgorodsky urban constituency No.4
Candidate	Party	Votes	%
Tatyana Babenko	United Russia	8,537	51.92%
Ivan Kolchanov	Liberal Democratic Party	3,405	21.16%
Yury Shashnin	Communist Party	2,477	15.39%
Oksana Oblakova	A Just Russia – For Truth	1,425	8.85%
Total		16,095	100%

==== District 5 ====
Summary of the 12–14 September 2025 Belgorod Oblast Duma election in Belgorodsky urban constituency No.5
Candidate	Party	Votes	%
Ivan Konev (incumbent)	United Russia	8,929	52.74%
Aleksandr Kovtun	Party of Pensioners	3,002	17.73%
Konstantin Salov	Communist Party	2,897	17.11%
Yury Yakushev	Liberal Democratic Party	1,705	10.07%
Total		16,930	100%

==== District 6 ====
Summary of the 12–14 September 2025 Belgorod Oblast Duma election in Belgorodsky urban constituency No.6
Candidate	Party	Votes	%
Vladimir Vashchenko (incumbent)	United Russia	8,667	52.99%
Maksim Altukhov	Liberal Democratic Party	3,071	18.77%
Yelena Brezhneva	Communist Party	2,459	15.03%
Yelena Strekozova	Party of Pensioners	1,724	10.54%
Total		16,357	100%

==== District 7 ====
Summary of the 12–14 September 2025 Belgorod Oblast Duma election in Belgorodsky urban constituency No.7
Candidate	Party	Votes	%
Svetlana Shlyakhova (incumbent)	United Russia	9,727	57.27%
Bogdan Voylokov	Communist Party	2,513	14.80%
Sergey Konovalov	A Just Russia – For Truth	2,371	13.96%
Konstantin Klimashevsky	Liberal Democratic Party	1,905	11.22%
Total		16,984	100%

==== District 8 ====
Summary of the 12–14 September 2025 Belgorod Oblast Duma election in Belgorodsky rural constituency No.8
Candidate	Party	Votes	%
Aleksandr Selivanov	United Russia	16,845	66.61%
Yekaterina Dolgova	Communist Party	3,865	15.28%
Yevgeny Golovin	Liberal Democratic Party	2,165	8.56%
Olga Bozhkova	Party of Pensioners	1,982	7.84%
Total		25,290	100%

==== District 9 ====
Summary of the 12–14 September 2025 Belgorod Oblast Duma election in Belgorodsky rural constituency No.9
Candidate	Party	Votes	%
Stanislav Aleynik	United Russia	23,215	79.12%
Marina Nikiforova	Party of Pensioners	3,417	11.65%
Yevgeny Martynov	Communist Party	2,454	8.36%
Total		29,341	100%

==== District 10 ====
Summary of the 12–14 September 2025 Belgorod Oblast Duma election in Belgorodsky rural constituency No.10
Candidate	Party	Votes	%
Sergey Tyutyunov (incumbent)	United Russia	17,902	61.08%
Aleksandr Kurchevsky	Communist Party	3,715	12.68%
Natalya Mereshchenko	Liberal Democratic Party	2,796	9.54%
Olga Khudasova	Party of Pensioners	2,490	8.50%
Tatyana Troshina	A Just Russia – For Truth	1,881	6.42%
Total		29,307	100%

==== District 11 ====
Summary of the 12–14 September 2025 Belgorod Oblast Duma election in Valuysky constituency No.11
Candidate	Party	Votes	%
Nadezhda Bondarenko	United Russia	24,075	67.05%
Andrey Koltykov	Liberal Democratic Party	6,622	18.44%
Dmitry Boldinov	Communist Party	2,657	7.40%
Konstantin Bikmullin	A Just Russia – For Truth	1,951	5.43%
Total		35,906	100%

==== District 12 ====
Summary of the 12–14 September 2025 Belgorod Oblast Duma election in Volokonovsky constituency No.12
Candidate	Party	Votes	%
Aleksey Balanovsky	United Russia	26,033	80.73%
Tatyana Mushtatova	Communist Party	3,421	10.61%
Natalya Starchenko	Party of Pensioners	2,414	7.49%
Total		32,247	100%

==== District 13 ====
Summary of the 12–14 September 2025 Belgorod Oblast Duma election in Grayvoronsky constituency No.13
Candidate	Party	Votes	%
Viktor Trofimenko	United Russia	23,308	72.49%
Nikolay Andreyev	Communist Party	4,490	13.96%
Aleksandr Prokofyev	Liberal Democratic Party	2,441	7.59%
Yevgeny Oblakov	A Just Russia – For Truth	1,628	5.06%
Total		32,155	100%

==== District 14 ====
Summary of the 12–14 September 2025 Belgorod Oblast Duma election in Gubkinsky constituency No.14
Candidate	Party	Votes	%
Vladimir Yevdokimov (incumbent)	United Russia	11,353	55.79%
Igor Chasovskikh	A Just Russia – For Truth	3,660	17.99%
Yury Krivoderov	Communist Party	3,418	16.80%
Yelena Gorina	Liberal Democratic Party	1,806	8.88%
Total		20,348	100%

==== District 15 ====
Summary of the 12–14 September 2025 Belgorod Oblast Duma election in Gubkinsky constituency No.15
Candidate	Party	Votes	%
Yelena Yemelyanova	United Russia	30,988	79.48%
Sergey Kurchin	A Just Russia – For Truth	2,934	7.53%
Dmitry Subbota	Communist Party	2,757	7.07%
Marina Bashkatova	Liberal Democratic Party	2,187	5.61%
Total		38,990	100%

==== District 16 ====
Summary of the 12–14 September 2025 Belgorod Oblast Duma election in Korochansky constituency No.16
Candidate	Party	Votes	%
Igor Zakotenko (incumbent)	United Russia	27,319	70.10%
Denis Pushkarny	Liberal Democratic Party	5,883	15.10%
Aleksandr Cherkasov	Communist Party	4,995	12.82%
Total		38,971	100%

==== District 17 ====
Summary of the 12–14 September 2025 Belgorod Oblast Duma election in Krasnogvardeysky constituency No.17
Candidate	Party	Votes	%
Sergey Shumsky	United Russia	31,071	74.96%
Vitaly Lazurenko	Communist Party	5,847	14.11%
Konstantin Lysenko	Liberal Democratic Party	2,394	5.78%
Ernest Kamalyan	A Just Russia – For Truth	1,523	3.67%
Total		41,448	100%

==== District 18 ====
Summary of the 12–14 September 2025 Belgorod Oblast Duma election in Novooskolsky constituency No.18
Candidate	Party	Votes	%
Yelena Romanenko	United Russia	37,487	89.36%
Ivan Grebennikov	Communist Party	1,749	4.17%
Nikolay Lifar	Liberal Democratic Party	1,479	3.53%
Yekaterina Kurlykina	Party of Pensioners	1,133	2.70%
Total		41,952	100%

==== District 19 ====
Summary of the 12–14 September 2025 Belgorod Oblast Duma election in Rakityansky constituency No.19
Candidate	Party	Votes	%
Vasily Leonov (incumbent)	United Russia	25,951	78.93%
Ria Goncharova	Party of Pensioners	2,889	8.79%
Vladimir Baglay	Communist Party	2,082	6.33%
Ilya Komarov	Liberal Democratic Party	1,795	5.46%
Total		32,880	100%

==== District 20 ====
Summary of the 12–14 September 2025 Belgorod Oblast Duma election in Starooskolsky constituency No.20
Candidate	Party	Votes	%
Oleg Shatokhin	United Russia	14,466	57.06%
Anna Semyonova	Liberal Democratic Party	3,181	12.55%
Oleg Korchagin	A Just Russia – For Truth	2,488	9.81%
Marina Aleksandrova	Party of Pensioners	2,447	9.65%
Yevgeny Safarov	Communist Party	2,259	8.91%
Total		25,351	100%

==== District 21 ====
Summary of the 12–14 September 2025 Belgorod Oblast Duma election in Starooskolsky constituency No.21
Candidate	Party	Votes	%
Igor Barshchuk (incumbent)	United Russia	15,445	62.11%
Yelena Dremova	Liberal Democratic Party	4,460	17.94%
Maria Kalinina	Independent	4,413	17.75%
Total		24,866	100%

==== District 22 ====
Summary of the 12–14 September 2025 Belgorod Oblast Duma election in Starooskolsky constituency No.22
Candidate	Party	Votes	%
Kirill Chernov	United Russia	18,310	70.29%
Nina Mishustina	Party of Pensioners	4,026	15.45%
Ilya Kobzarev	Liberal Democratic Party	3,370	12.94%
Total		26,050	100%

==== District 23 ====
Summary of the 12–14 September 2025 Belgorod Oblast Duma election in Starooskolsky constituency No.23
Candidate	Party	Votes	%
Sergey Gusev (incumbent)	United Russia	17,526	67.28%
Olga Ivannikova	Party of Pensioners	2,933	11.26%
Vladimir Nazarenko	Communist Party	2,772	10.64%
Anna Revenkova	Liberal Democratic Party	2,554	9.80%
Total		26,049	100%

==== District 24 ====
Summary of the 12–14 September 2025 Belgorod Oblast Duma election in Shebekinsky constituency No.24
Candidate	Party	Votes	%
Gennady Chmirev (incumbent)	United Russia	12,041	58.51%
Sergey Anokhin	Communist Party	3,543	17.22%
Yegor Akhundzhanov	Liberal Democratic Party	2,228	10.83%
Vladimir Maksimov	Party of Pensioners	1,956	9.50%
Total		20,579	100%

==== District 25 ====
Summary of the 12–14 September 2025 Belgorod Oblast Duma election in Yakovlevsky constituency No.25
Candidate	Party	Votes	%
Vladimir Zotov (incumbent)	United Russia	32,085	76.14%
Stanislav Balykov	Communist Party	3,695	8.77%
Vitaly Moskovykh	Liberal Democratic Party	3,600	8.54%
Sergey Milshin	A Just Russia – For Truth	2,380	5.65%
Total		42,137	100%

=== Members ===
Incumbent deputies are highlighted with bold, elected members who declined to take a seat are marked with ~~strikethrough~~.

Constituency
No.	Member	Party
1	Mikhail Litovkin	United Russia
2	Roman Protsenko	United Russia
3	Lyubov Kireyeva	United Russia
4	Tatyana Babenko	United Russia
5	Ivan Konev	United Russia
6	Vladimir Vashchenko	United Russia
7	Svetlana Shlyakhova	United Russia
8	Aleksandr Selivanov	United Russia
9	Stanislav Aleynik	United Russia
10	Sergey Tyutyunov	United Russia
11	Nadezhda Bondarenko	United Russia
12	Aleksey Balanovsky	United Russia
13	Viktor Trofimenko	United Russia
14	Vladimir Yevdokimov	United Russia
15	Yelena Yemelyanova	United Russia
16	Igor Zakotenko	United Russia
17	Sergey Shumsky	United Russia
18	Yelena Romanenko	United Russia
19	Vasily Leonov	United Russia
20	Oleg Shatokhin	United Russia
21	Igor Barshchuk	United Russia
22	Kirill Chernov	United Russia
23	Sergey Gusev	United Russia
24	Gennady Chmirev	United Russia
25	Vladimir Zotov	United Russia

Party lists
Member	Party
~~Vyacheslav Gladkov~~	United Russia
Vyacheslav Vorobyov	United Russia
Anna Kocherova	United Russia
Viktor Kovalev	United Russia
Mikhail Ananichev	United Russia
Yury Klepikov	United Russia
Irina Timoshevskaya	United Russia
Mikhail Savchenko	United Russia
Olga Ustinova	United Russia
Olga Mevsha	United Russia
Yevgeny Mikhaylyukov	United Russia
Sergey Balashov	United Russia
Olesya Nesterenko	United Russia
Yevgeny Dmitriyev	United Russia
Yelena Gurova	United Russia
Yelena Batanova	United Russia
Olga Chernobok	United Russia
Vitaly Dunaytsev	United Russia
Svetlana Nemtseva	United Russia
Ivan Ovchinnikov	United Russia
Andrey Kozhemyakin	United Russia
Yury Kokhovich	United Russia
~~Leonid Slutsky~~	Liberal Democratic Party
Yevgeny Dremov	Liberal Democratic Party
Bogdan Chervinsky	Liberal Democratic Party
Valery Shevlyakov	Communist Party
Nikolay Mukhin	Communist Party

== See also ==
- 2025 Russian regional elections
