= Anna Kocherova =

- Анна Кочерова
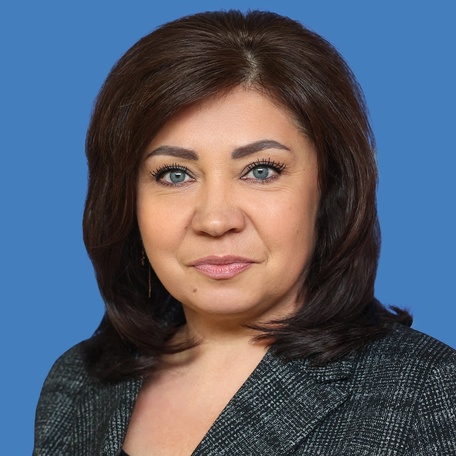

Senator from Belgorod Oblast
- Incumbent
- Assumed office 25 September 2025
- Preceded by: Taras Khtey

Personal details
- Born: 10 August 1978 (age 48) Saratov, RSFSR, Soviet Union
- Party: United Russia
- Education: Belgorod State University

Anna Mikhailovna Kocherova (Russian: Анна Михайловна Кочерова; born August 10, 1978, in Saratov) is a Russian politician. She has served as a Senator of the Federation Council representing the Belgorod Oblast Duma since 2025. She is a member of the Federation Council Committee on Federal Structure, Regional Policy, Local Self-Government, and Northern Affairs.

== Biography ==
Born August 10, 1978, in Saratov, she graduated from Belgorod State University in 2000. She headed the social policy committee in the Shebekinsky District Administration of the Belgorod Oblast and served as deputy head of the Shebekinsky Urban District Administration. In 2016, she was appointed principal of the Maslovopristanskaya Secondary Comprehensive School (Shebekinsky Urban District). In February 2019, she became deputy head of the Shebekinsky Urban District Administration for social policy, and in January 2023, she became director of the autonomous non-profit organization "Committee of Families of Soldiers of the Fatherland of the Belgorod Oblast". In June 2023, she headed the Belgorod Oblast branch of the State Fund for Support of Participants in the Special Military Operation "Defenders of the Fatherland". On September 14, 2025, she was elected as a deputy of the Belgorod Oblast Duma of the VIII convocation in the 3rd constituency on the United Russia party list.

On September 25, 2025, at the first meeting of the new convocation, regional Duma deputies voted to grant Anna Kocherova the powers of a senator of the Russian Federation, a representative of the regional legislative body.
