= Governor of Belgorod Oblast =

Highest-ranking official in Belgorod Oblast, Russia

- Coat of arms of Belgorod Oblast

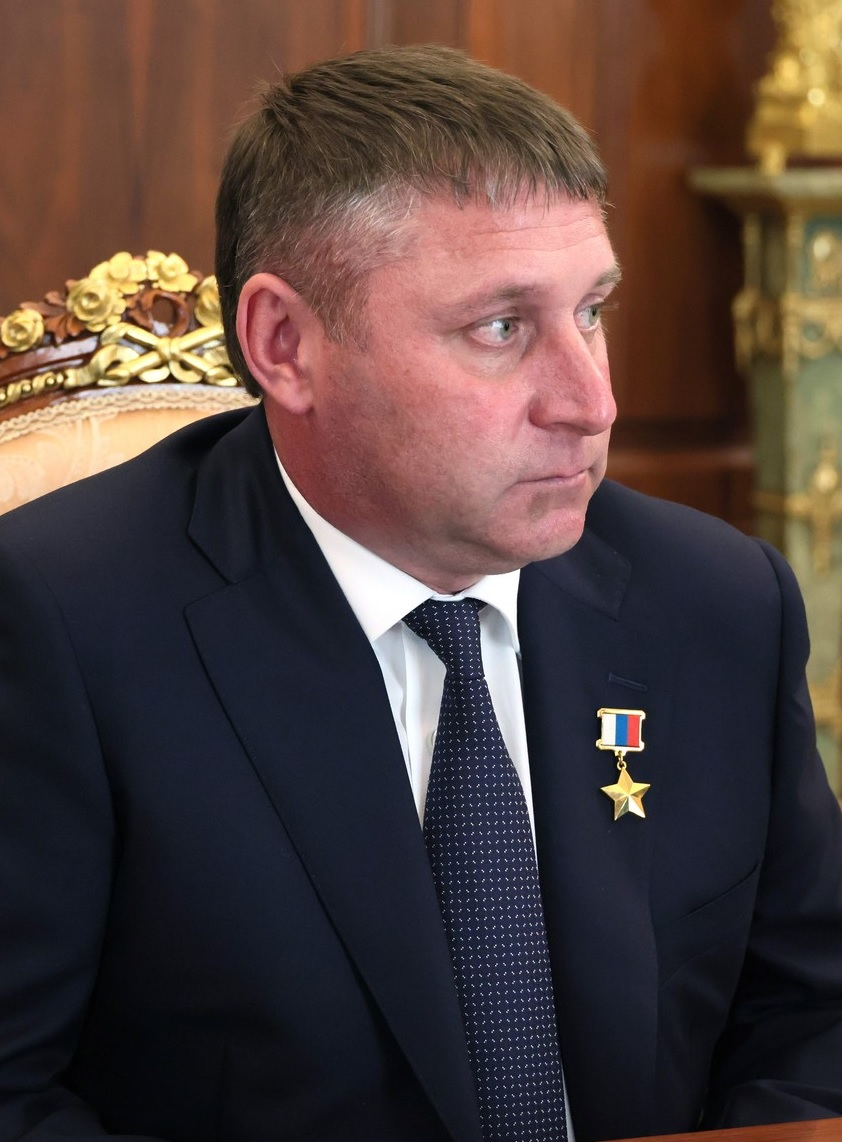
- Incumbent; Alexander Shuvaev since 13 May 2026
- Seat: Belgorod
- Term length: Five years, no more than two consecutive terms
- Inaugural holder: Viktor Berestovoy
- Formation: 1991
- Website: belregion.ru

The governor of Belgorod Oblast (Russian: Губернатор Белгородской области) is the highest official and the head of the executive power of Belgorod Oblast, a region in Central Russia.

== History of office ==
The office of the Head of Administration was introduced in Russia in August 1991 during the downfall of the Soviet Union. Administrations and their Heads were supposed to replace Soviet executive committees (ispolkoms) and their chairmen. The first head of Belgorod Oblast Administration Viktor Berestovoy was appointed by president Boris Yeltsin in November 1991. Two years later he was removed from office for his support of the Supreme Soviet and Vice President Alexander Rutskoy in the 1993 constitutional crisis.

Berestovoy's successor Yevgeny Savchenko, had previously worked as deputy head of the Main Directorate of Crop Production of the Ministry of Agriculture. In office from October 1993 to September 2020, he is the longest-serving Russian governor in post-Soviet history.

== List of office-holders ==
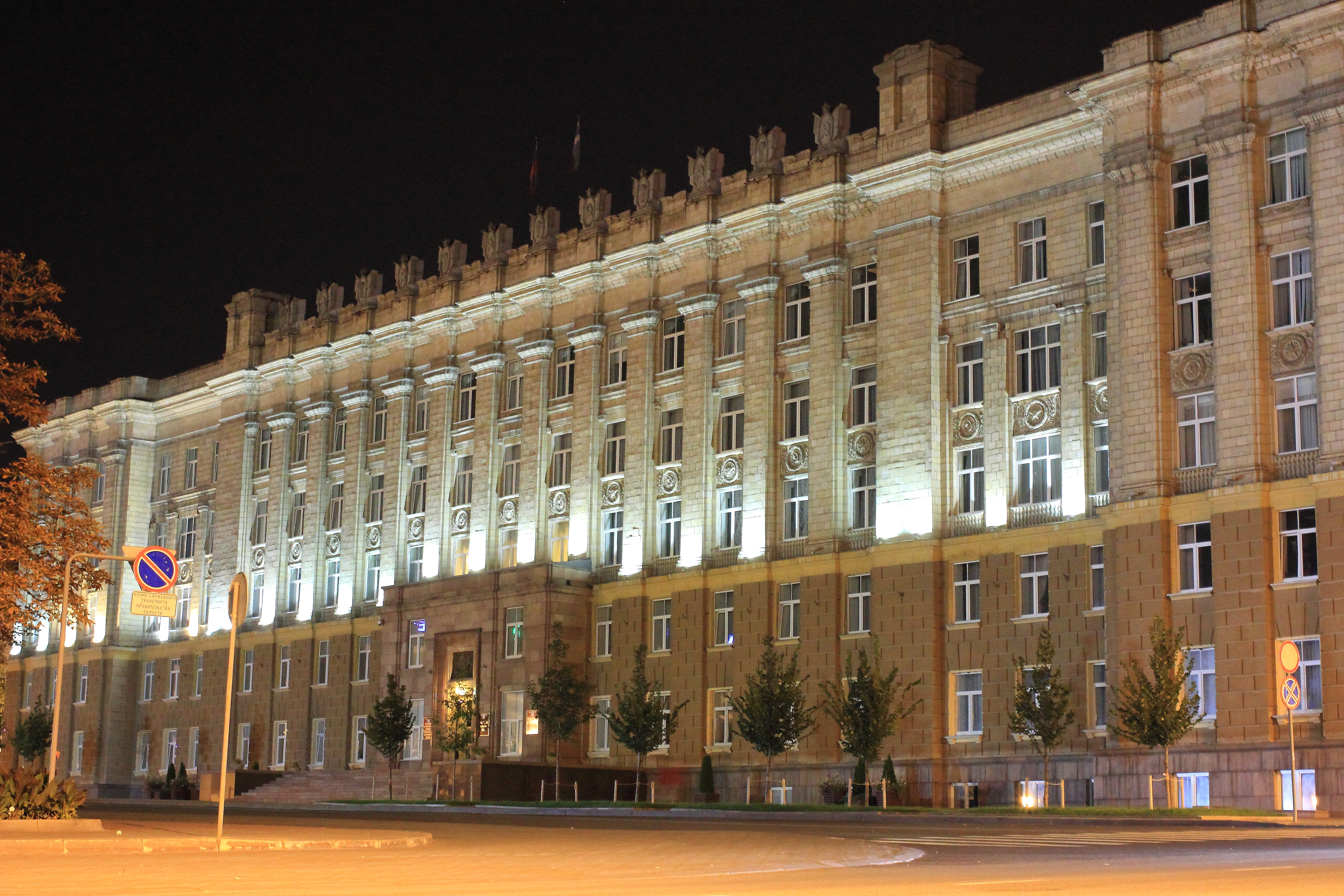
Belgorod Oblast Administration

No.	Portrait	Name	Tenure	Time in office	Party	Election
1		Viktor Berestovoy (born 1948)	30 November 1991 – 11 October 1993 (removed)	1 year, 315 days	Independent	Appointed
–		Yevgeny Savchenko (born 1950)	11 October 1993 – 18 December 1993	26 years, 347 days	Independent → United Russia	Acting
2		Yevgeny Savchenko (born 1950)	18 December 1993 – 16 June 2012 (term end)	26 years, 347 days	Independent → United Russia	Appointed 1995; 1999; 2003; 2007 (Note: Appointed by the president of Russia with the consent of the Belgorod Oblast Duma.)
–		Yevgeny Savchenko (born 1950)	16 June 2012 – 20 October 2012	26 years, 347 days	Independent → United Russia	Acting
(2)		Yevgeny Savchenko (born 1950)	20 October 2012 – 22 September 2020 (resigned)	26 years, 347 days	Independent → United Russia	2012; 2017
–		Denis Butsayev (born 1977)	22 September 2020 – 18 November 2020	57 days	United Russia	Acting
–		Vyacheslav Gladkov (born 1969)	18 November 2020– 27 September 2021	5 years, 176 days	United Russia	Acting
3		Vyacheslav Gladkov (born 1969)	27 September 2021 – 13 May 2026 (resigned)	5 years, 176 days	United Russia	2021
–		Alexander Shuvaev (born 1981)	13 May 2026 – 2 October 2026	142 days	United Russia	Acting
4		Alexander Shuvaev (born 1981)	2 October 2026 – present	142 days	United Russia	2026
