= Natalia Poluyanova =

Russian politician (born 1981)

- Наталия Полуянова

Member of the State Duma
- Incumbent
- Assumed office 19 September 2021

Chairman of the Belgorod Oblast Duma
- In office September 2019 – 22 September 2020
- Preceded by: Vasily Potryasayev
- Succeeded by: Olga Pavlova

Personal details
- Born: 11 March 1981 (age 45) Belgorod, Belgorod Oblast, Russian Soviet Federative Socialist Republic, USSR
- Party: United Russia
- Education: Belgorod Technological University

Natalia Poluyanova (Russian: Наталия Владимировна Полуянова; born 11 March 1981 in Belgorod, Belgorod Oblast) is a Russian political figure and a deputy of the 8th State Duma.

Poluyanova started her political career in 2003 when she became the chief specialist of the Belgorod branch of the United Russia. From 2006 to 2010, she worked as the head of the youth policy department of the department of education, culture, sports and youth policy of the administration of Belgorod. On 10 October 2010 she was elected deputy of the Belgorod Oblast Duma. In 2014–2016, she headed the Korochansky District. In September 2019, Poluyanova became the chairman of the Belgorod Oblast Duma. Since September 2021, she has served as deputy of the 8th State Duma.

== Sanctions ==
She was sanctioned by the UK government in 2022 in relation to the Russo-Ukrainian War.

She is one of the members of the State Duma the United States Treasury sanctioned on 24 March 2022 in response to the 2022 Russian invasion of Ukraine.
