= Zarechny, Penza Oblast =

Closed town in Penza Oblast, Russia

Zarechny Заречный
- Town
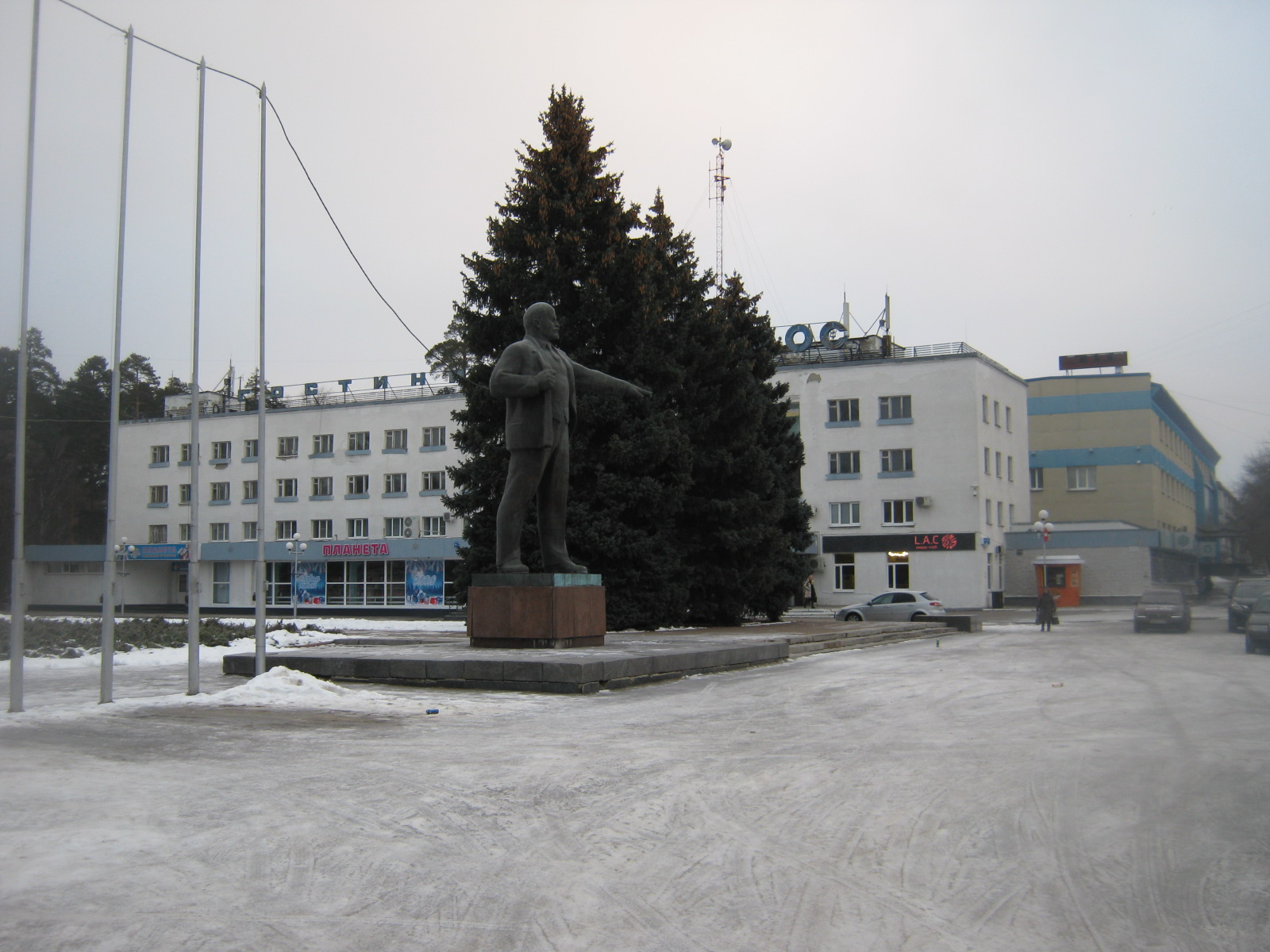
- "Kosmos" Hotel and Lenin statue in Zarechny

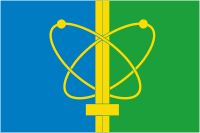
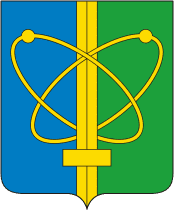
- Flag Coat of arms
- Interactive map of Zarechny
- Location of Zarechny Zarechny (Penza Oblast)
- Coordinates: 53°12′00″N 45°10′00″E
- Country: Russia
- Federal subject: Penza Oblast
- Founded: 1958

Government
  - Head: Vyacheslav Gladkov
- Elevation: 200 m (660 ft)

Population (2010 Census)
  - Total: 63,601
  - Estimate (2025): 58,597 (−7.9%)
  - Rank: 249th in 2010

Administrative status
  - Subordinated to: town of oblast significance of Zarechny
  - Capital of: town of oblast significance of Zarechny

Municipal status
  - Urban okrug: Zarechny Urban Okrug
  - Capital of: Zarechny Urban Okrug
- Time zone: UTC+3 (MSK)
- Postal code: 442960
- Dialing code: +7 8412
- OKTMO ID: 56734000001
- Website: zarechny.zato.ru

Zarechny (Russian: Заре́чный), formerly named Penza-19 (Пе́нза-19) from 1962 to 1992, is a closed town in Penza Oblast, Russia, located 12 kilometers (7.5 mi) east of Penza. Population: 63,601 (2010 census); 62,970 (2002 census).

== History ==
It was formed in 1958, on the territory of Penza's Zarechny City District. It was closed and named Penza-19 in 1962 and renamed Zarechny in 1992.

== Administrative and municipal status ==
Within the framework of administrative divisions, it is incorporated as the town of oblast significance of Zarechny—an administrative unit with the status equal to that of the districts. As a municipal division, the town of oblast significance of Zarechny is incorporated as Zarechny Urban Okrug.

== Economy ==
Zarechny's main employer is Rosatom and a major industry is manufacture of nuclear weapon components. Other industries include electronics and software.

== Notable people ==
- Maria Titova, rhythmic gymnast
