= Garbuzovo =

Garbuzovo Гарбузово
- Selo
- Location within Belgorod Oblast Location within Russia
- Coordinates: 50°27′N 38°45′E
- Country: Russia
- Region: Belgorod Oblast
- District: Alexeyevsky District
- Time zone: UTC+3:00

Garbuzovo (Russian: Гарбузово) is a rural locality (a selo) and the administrative center of Garbuzovskoye Rural Settlement, Alexeyevsky District, Belgorod Oblast, Russia. The population was 665 as of 2010. There are 3 streets.

== Geography ==
Garbuzovo is located 21 km south of Alexeyevka (the district's administrative centre) by road. Pokladov is the nearest rural locality.
