= Alexander Shuvaev =

Russian politician

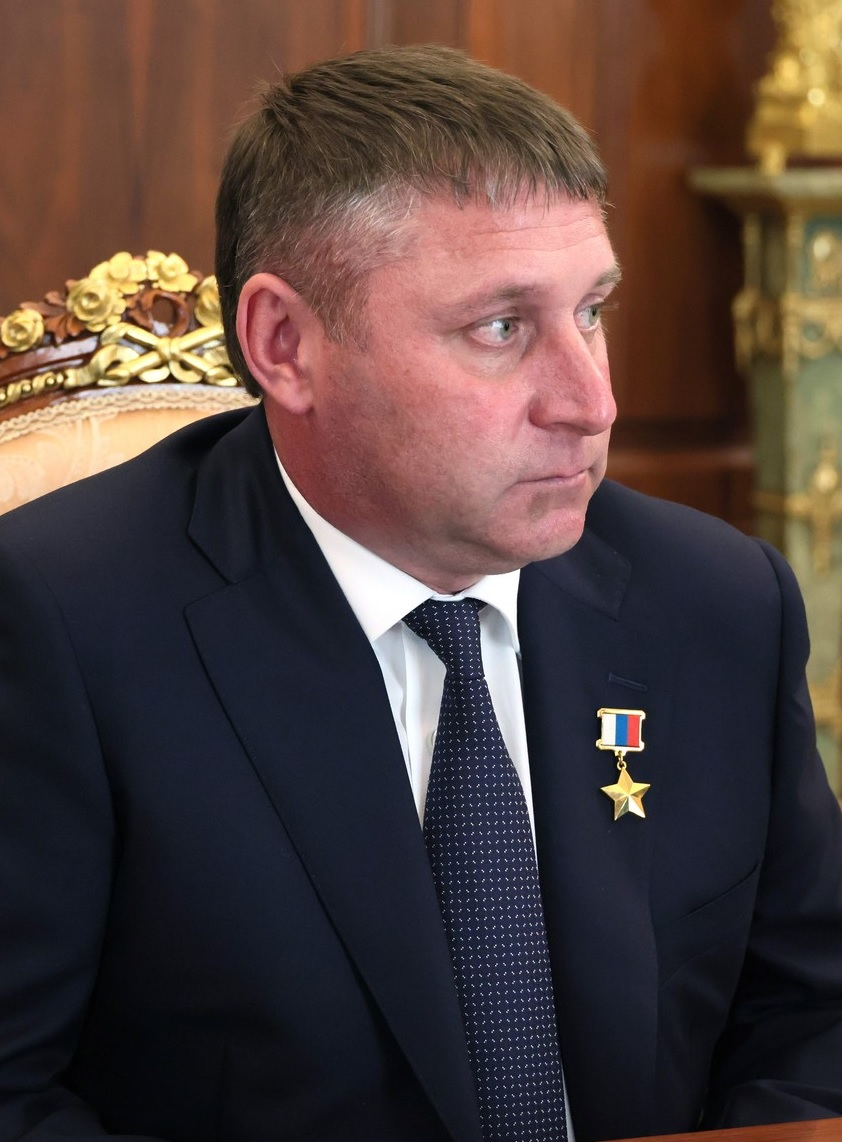

Acting governor of Belgorod Oblast
- Incumbent
- Assumed office 13 May 2026
- President: Vladimir Putin
- Preceded by: Vyacheslav Gladkov

Deputy Governor of the Irkutsk Oblast
- In office 19 January – 13 May 2026

Personal details
- Born: 7 May 1981 (age 45) Novy Oskol, Belgorod Oblast, RSFSR, USSR
- Party: United Russia
- Education: Ryazan Guards Higher Airborne Command School; Combined Arms Academy of the Armed Forces of the Russian Federation

Military service
- Rank: Major General

Aleksandr Mikhailovich Shuvaev (Russian: Александр Михайлович Шуваев; born on 7 May 1981) is a Russian politician and former army officer who is acting as the governor of Belgorod Oblast since 13 May 2026.

Hero of the Russian Federation (2025). Major General (2024).

== Biography ==
Shuvaev was born on May 7, 1981, in Novy Oskol Belgorod Oblast.

After graduating from high school, he received higher education at the Ryazan Institute of Airborne Troops. He graduated there in 2002.

In 2015, he graduated from the M.V.Frunze Combined Arms Academy of the Armed Forces.

In 2015–2025, he served in the Armed Forces of the Russian Federation.

On January 19, 2026, he was appointed Deputy Governor of the Irkutsk Oblast.

On April 10, 2026, Shuvaev as the main candidate for the position of Governor of the Belgorod Region.

Since May 13, 2026, he has been the acting governor of the Belgorod Oblast.

== Awards ==
- Hero of the Russian Federation
- Order of Merit for the Fatherland, IV degree (with swords)
- Order of Alexander Nevsky
- Orders of Courage
- Medal Suvorov Medal.
