= Yevgeny Savchenko =

Russian politician (born 1950)

- Евгений Савченко
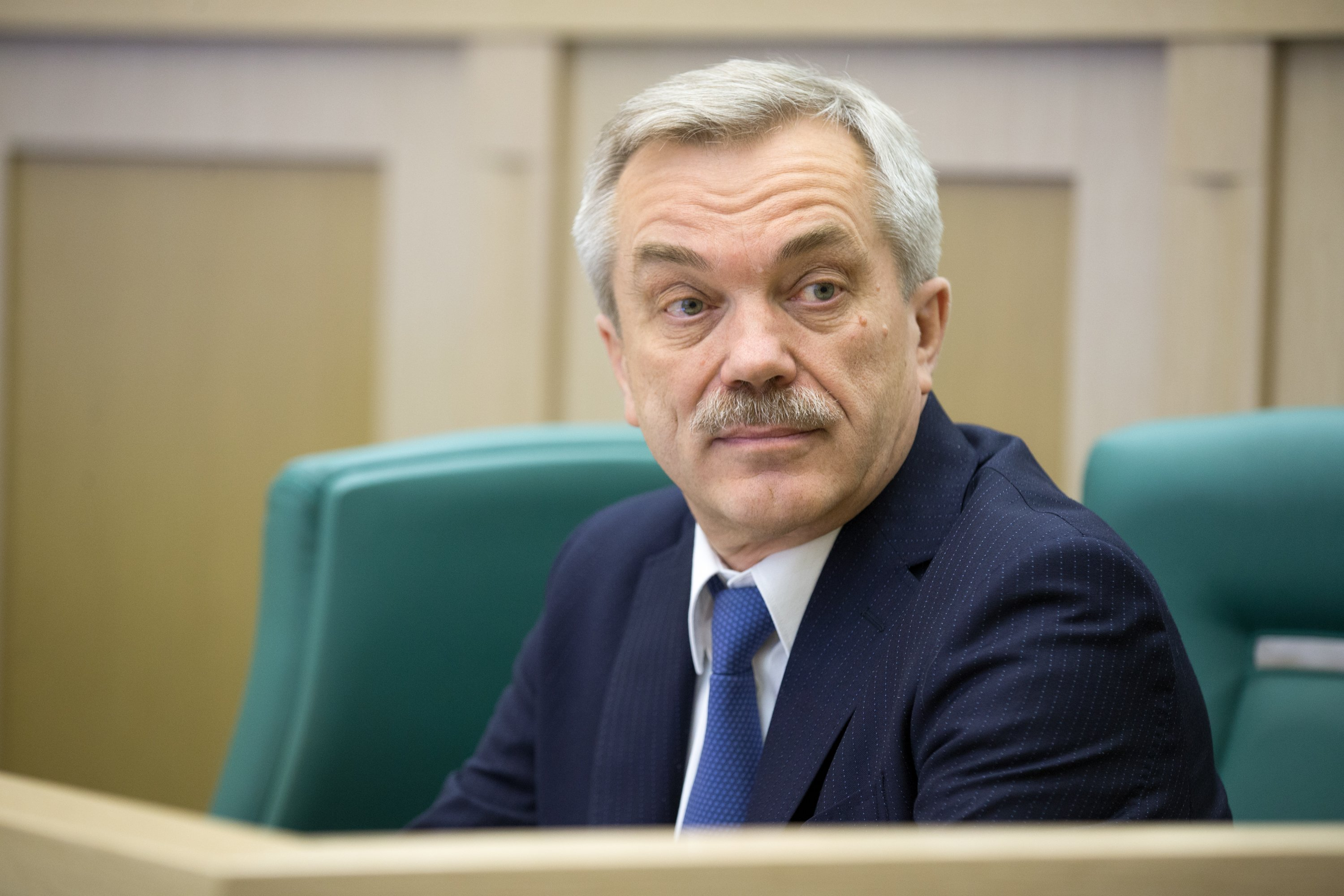
- Savchenko in 2016

Russian Federation Senator from Belgorod Oblast
- In office 22 September 2020 – 5 June 2024
- Preceded by: Ivan Kulabukhov

2nd Governor of Belgorod Oblast
- In office 11 October 1993 – 22 September 2020
- Preceded by: Viktor Berestovoy
- Succeeded by: Denis Butsayev (acting); Vyacheslav Gladkov

Personal details
- Born: 8 April 1950 (age 76) Krasnaya Yaruga, Belgorod Oblast, RSFSR, USSR
- Party: United Russia
- Profession: Farmer

Yevgeny Stepanovich Savchenko (Russian: Евгений Степанович Савченко; born 1950) is a Russian politician, who was a Governor and then Senator of Belgorod Oblast. He had served as the governor of Belgorod Oblast in Southern Russia from 1993 to 2020, the country’s last remaining governor from the Yeltsin era, and Senator from 2020 to 2024. Savchenko is a member of United Russia. He was also a member of the Federation Council from 1996 to 2001.

Savchenko is a supporter of President Putin and won by a clear majority against his communist challenger, Vasily Altukhov in 2003, receiving 61% of the votes. He had previously been elected in 1999, when he won against Vladimir Zhirinovsky. He initiated a campaign against swearing in his district.

== Sanctions ==
He was sanctioned by the UK government in 2022 in relation to the Russo-Ukrainian War.
