= Denis Butsayev =

Russian statesman

- Денис Буцаев
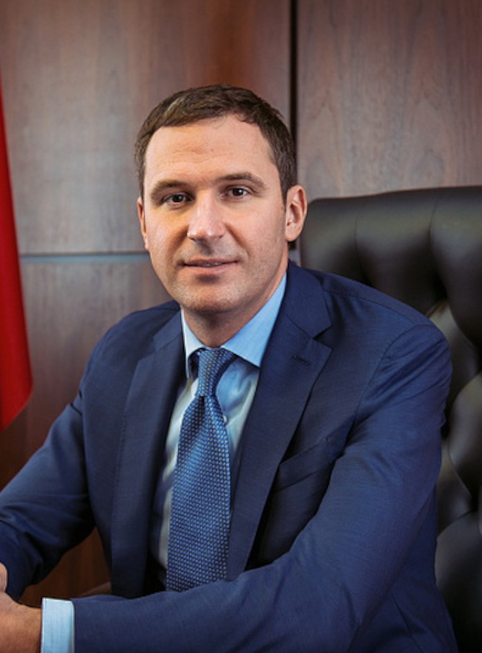
- Butsayev in 2020

Governor of Belgorod Oblast
- Acting
- In office 22 September 2020 – 18 November 2020
- Preceded by: Yevgeny Savchenko
- Succeeded by: Vyacheslav Gladkov

First Deputy Governor of Belgorod Oblast
- In office 17 September 2020 – 22 November 2020

Deputy Chairman of the Government of Moscow Oblast
- In office 10 July 2014 – 19 December 2018

Personal details
- Born: Denis Petrovich Butsayev; 7 March 1977 (age 49) Moscow, Soviet Union
- Party: Independent

Denis Petrovich Butsayev (Russian: Денис Петрович Буцаев; born on 7 March 1977) is Russia’s former deputy minister of natural resources and ecology. On 22 April 2026, the same day his resignation was accepted, he left Russia through Belarus.

== Biography ==
Denis Butsaev was born on 7 March 1977 in Moscow. He is the grandson of Vyacheslav Tsymbal, an honorary lawyer of Russia, and a member of the Moscow Legal Center Bar Association.

Busayev began his work in 1998 as a lawyer in the regional division of IBM Corporation for Europe, the Middle East and Africa.

In 1999, he graduated from Oleg Kutafin Moscow State Law University with a degree in Jurisprudence.

From 2004 to 2007, Butsayev headed the legal department of the CIS and Eastern Europe, at the same time was a member of the board of directors of Hewlett-Packard LLC (the Russian branch of the group).

From 10 July 2014 to 19 December 2018, Butsayev was Deputy Prime Minister of the Moscow Oblast Government, in parallel from 10 September 2015 to 20 September 2018, he headed the Regional Ministry of Investments and Innovations.

On 19 February 2019, Prime Minister Dmitry Medvedev appointed Butsayev as CEO of the state-run Russian Ecological Operator (REO), but on November 23, he left his post.

On 17 September 2020, the Governor of the Belgorod Oblast, Yevgeny Savchenko, appointed Butsayev as his first deputy and immediately resigned after that.

Butsayev became the acting governor of Belgorod Oblast until 18 November 2020, when he returned as CEO of REO. He held this post until moving to the Natural Resources Ministry in 2025, where he was Deputy Minister.

He was removed from office on 22 April 2026. On the same day, he left Russia via Belarus as investigators opened criminal cases against several senior executives at REO, which one source reported included him as its former CEO.
