= Vyacheslav Gladkov =

Russian statesman and politician

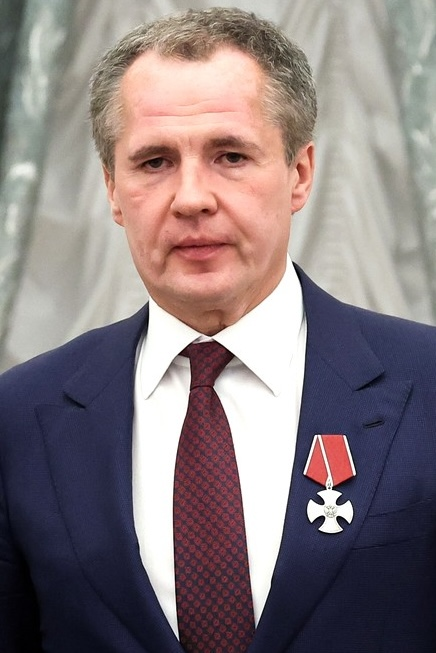

Governor of Belgorod Oblast
- In office 27 September 2021 – 13 May 2026; Acting: 18 November 2020 — 27 September 2021
- Preceded by: Yevgeny Savchenko; Denis Butsayev (acting)
- Succeeded by: Alexander Shuvaev (acting)

Deputy chairman of the Government of the Stavropol Krai
- In office 13 June 2018 – 22 November 2020
- Governor: Vladimir Vladimirov
- Preceded by: Olga Prudnikova
- Succeeded by: Igor Babkin

Deputy Governor of Sevastopol
- In office 10 July 2016 – 16 April 2018
- Governor: Sergey Menyaylo; Dmitry Ovsyannikov
- Succeeded by: Vladimir Tatarchuk

Mayor city of Zarechny
- In office 24 April 2009 – 23 September 2016

Personal details
- Born: 15 January 1969 (age 57) Kuchki, Penza Oblast, Soviet Union
- Party: United Russia
- Education: Saint Petersburg State University of Economics and Finance; Penza State University; Russian Presidential Academy of National Economy and Public Administration
- Awards: Order of Alexander Nevsky; Order of Courage (Russia)

Vyacheslav Vladimirovich Gladkov (Russian: Вячеслав Владимирович Гладков; born 15 January 1969) is a Russian politician who served as the governor of Belgorod Oblast from 27 September 2021 to 13 May 2026. Order of Alexander Nevsky (May 2026).

He served as the acting governor from 18 November 2020 before his election. He is a member of the United Russia party.

He served as Deputy Governor of Sevastopol from 28 July 2016 to 16 April 2018 and as Deputy Prime Minister of Stavropol Krai from 13 June 2018 to 18 November 2020. He began his career in 1997 in the Penza Construction Department.

== Early life and education ==
Gladkov was born on 15 January 1969 in the village of Kuchki, Penza Oblast, Russian SFSR, Soviet Union.

In 1996, he graduated from Saint Petersburg State University of Economics and Finance with a degree in economics. He later received additional education, graduating from Penza State University with a degree in municipal administration. In 2012, he completed a Master of Management degree at the Russian Presidential Academy of National Economy and Public Administration.

He is a candidate of Economic Sciences. In 2012, Gladkov defended a thesis entitled "Formation and development of regional agricultural cooperative markets (based on materials from the Penza Oblast)" at the Grozny State Oil Technical University.

He is a graduate of the third stream of the Program for training the personnel management reserve of the civil service, the so-called "school of governors".

== Career ==
=== Work in Penza Oblast ===
Gladokov began his career in 1997, at OAO Penza Construction Department. Initially as a contract and claims economist, but in the same year he was appointed head of the financial group of centralized accounting.

In 2000, he transferred to the civil service and for the next 16 years worked in the administration of the city of Zarechny, Penza Oblast. He first worked as a deputy head, and then as head of the economic department for economics and development of market relations. From 2002 to 2005, he was the Deputy Head of the Zarechny Administration for Economics and Entrepreneurship Development, and in 2009, he was the First Deputy Head of the Administration.

On 30 October 2008, he joined the United Russia party. In the same year, at the competition of municipalities, held by the Ministry of Regional Development, he became one of the winners in the nomination "Best Municipal Employee".

From 24 April 2009 to 23 September 2016, Gladkov was the mayor of Zarechny. In the fall of 2015, it became known about the preparation of a draft decree of the President of the Russian Federation to remove from 1 January 2016 the status of a closed administrative-territorial entity from six cities, including the "city of nuclear scientists" in Zarechny. Gladkov then stated that "this is categorically impossible to do," and eventually managed to lobby for the preservation of the status of ZATO with all its benefits.

=== Work in Sevastopol and Stavropol Krai ===
From September 2016, to the end of March 2018, Gladkov worked as Deputy Governor of Sevastopol under Dmitry Ovsyannikov for domestic policy. According to Kommersant sources, Gladkov was sent to Sevastopol to solve two tasks: to elect Dmitry Ovsyannikov (at that time, he was elected in direct elections in September 2017) and to hold presidential elections, which Vladimir Putin received 90.19% with a turnout of slightly above 70%. Immediately after the successful presidential campaign, Gladkov wanted to resign voluntarily, but remained in office until June, when he was found a replacement.

On 13 June 2018, the Governor of the Stavropol Krai, Vladimir Vladimirov appointed Gladkov his Deputy Chairman of the Regional Government for Internal Policy, at the same time Gladkov was appointed Chief of Staff of the Government of the Stavropol Krai. After re-election in the 2019 elections, Vladimirov formed a new government, and Gladkov retained his position and remained Deputy Prime Minister of the Stavropol Krai - Chief of Staff of the Government of the region. While working in Stavropol, he was a member of the presidium of the Stavropol regional political council of the United Russia party.

=== Governor of Belgorod Oblast ===
On 18 November 2020, by decree of president Putin, Gladkov was appointed acting governor of the Belgorod Oblast until a person elected head of the region takes office. The gubernatorial elections are scheduled for the next single voting day on 19 September 2021.

He replaced Denis Butsayev, the acting governor from 22 September to 18 November 2020, after Yevgeny Savchenko, who had headed the Belgorod Oblast for almost 27 years, who had resigned voluntarily.

After his appointment, Gladkov stated that "one has arrived so far" and "it is not necessary to wait for the personnel revolution," calling the fight against the coronavirus, increasing the income of Belgorod residents and implementing national projects a priority.

Gladkov won the gubernatorial election on 19 September 2021 with a result of 78.79%. He officially took office as governor on 27 September.

Gladkov has served as governor during the ongoing Russian invasion of Ukraine. He is prominently involved with the government response the ongoing 2023 Belgorod Oblast incursions. On 4 June 2023, a group of pro-Ukraine Russian partisans released a video statement announcing that they were willing to exchange Russian soldiers captured from Belgorod for a meeting with Gladkov. Gladkov agreed to the request, but according to the partisans, did not attend the meeting. In a later statement, Gladkov stated he met with local authorities but did not mention the proposed meeting.

== Sanctions ==
On 15 December 2022, against the backdrop of the Russian invasion of Ukraine, he was included in the US sanctions list for "calling citizens to war in response to the recent Russian mobilization order". On 30 November 2022, he was sanctioned by the UK because he "took part in the partial mobilization of military reservists in the Belgorod region and, therefore, in policies and actions that destabilize Ukraine".

For similar reasons, he is sanctioned by Ukraine, Australia, New Zealand and Hungary.

== Personal life ==
He is married, and has four children and one granddaughter.

His declared income in 2019 is 3,427,000 rubles. His spouse's is 1,707,000 rubles.

== Awards ==
- Medal “For Merit in the Development of Housing and Communal Services of Russia” (2003).
- Certificates of honor from the Governor of Penza Oblast, the Ministry of Regional Development of the Russian Federation, the Ministry of Internal Affairs, and a number of other agencies.
- Medal “For Strengthening Combat Brotherhood” (Ministry of Defence of Russia).
- Vyacheslav Gladkov received the title “Governor of the Year” at the RASO political award “The Hamburg Score.” The award was established by the Russian Public Relations Association in 2016. It is presented to politicians, parties, and political groups that have demonstrated effectiveness, technological sophistication, and creativity. Gladkov surpassed the heads of the Yamalo-Nenets Autonomous Okrug, Dmitry Artyukhov; Rostov Oblast, Vasily Golubev; Vologda Oblast, Oleg Kuvshinnikov; and Primorsky Krai, Oleg Kozhemyako (2022).
- Order of Courage (May 2, 2024) — for courage and selflessness shown in the performance of professional duty.
- Order of Alexander Nevsky (2026).
