= Belgorod Oblast Duma =

Regional parliament of Belgorod Oblast, Russia

Belgorod Oblast Duma Белгородская областная дума
- 7th legislature

Type
- Type: Unicameral

Leadership
- Chairman: Yury Klepikov, United Russia since 15 April 2022

Structure
- Seats: 50
- Political groups: United Russia (46) CPRF (2) LDPR (2)

Elections
- Voting system: Mixed
- Last election: 12-14 September 2025
- Next election: 2030

Meeting place
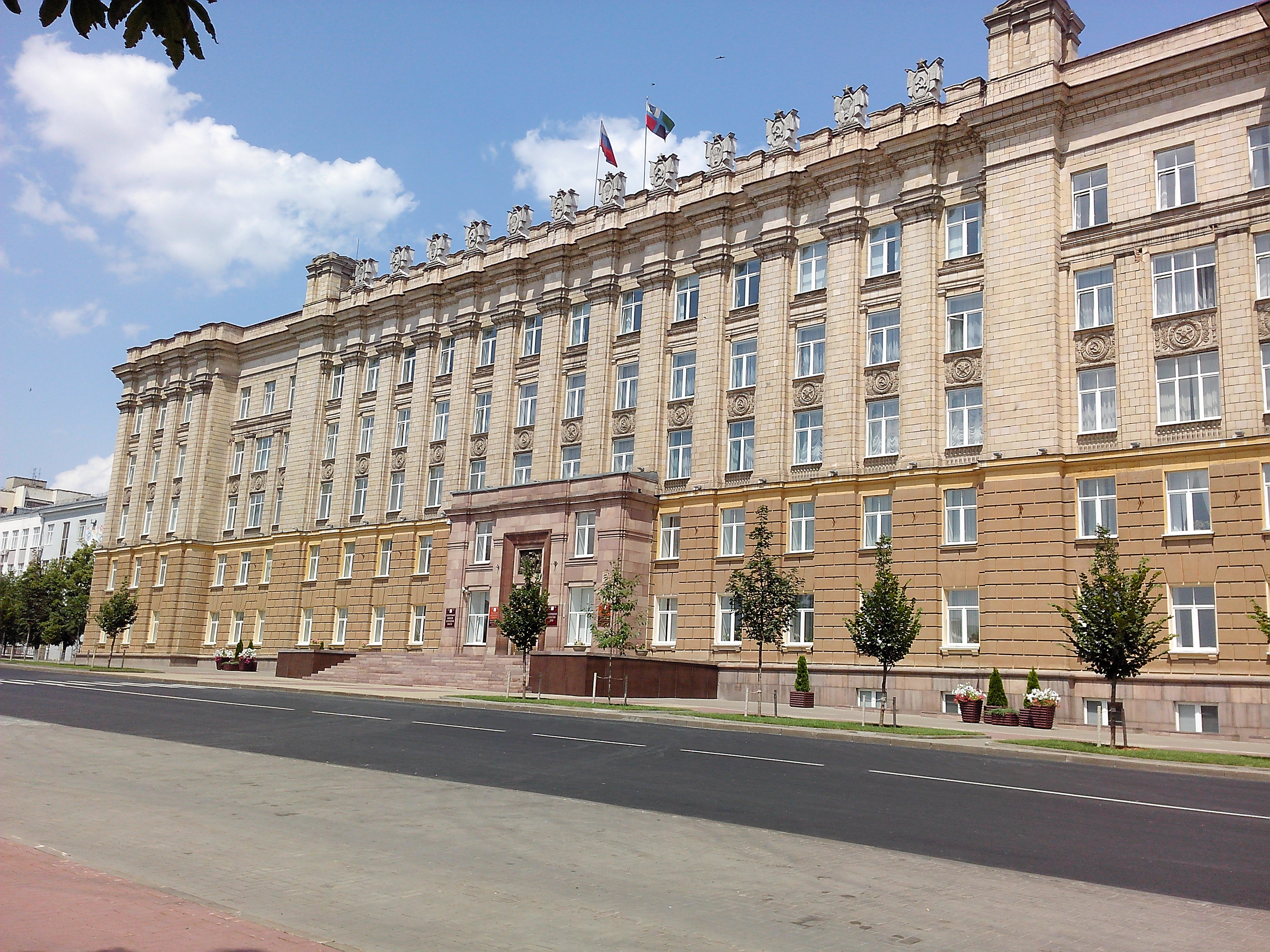
- 4 Cathedral Square, Belgorod

Website
- belduma.ru белдума.рф

The Belgorod Oblast Duma (Russian: Белгородская областная дума, romanized: Belgorodskaya oblastnaya duma) is the regional parliament of Belgorod Oblast, a federal subject of Russia. A total of 50 deputies are elected for five-year terms.

== Elections ==
=== 2015 ===
Party	%	Seats
United Russia	62.36	42
Communist Party of the Russian Federation	13.08	3
A Just Russia	8.23	2
Liberal Democratic Party of Russia	6.76	2
Registered voters/turnout	53.93	

=== 2020 ===
Party	%	Seats
United Russia	63.95	44
Communist Party of the Russian Federation	13.20	4
Liberal Democratic Party of Russia	6.58	1
Russian Party of Pensioners for Social Justice	5.11	1
Registered voters/turnout	54.46	

=== 2025 ===
Party	%	Seats
United Russia	72.98	46
Liberal Democratic Party of Russia	9.19	2
Communist Party of the Russian Federation	8.08	2
Registered voters/turnout	59.04	
