= 20th Guards NBC Regiment (Russia) =

20th Guards Radiation, Chemical and Biological Defense Regiment
- Active: 12 December 2014 — present
- Country: Russia (1992–present)
- Branch: Russian Ground Forces
- Type: Regiment
- Role: NBC Protection
- Part of: 1st Guards Tank Army
- Garrison/HQ: Nizhny Novgorod
- Engagements: Russo-Ukrainian War
- Decorations: Guards

The 20th Guards Radiation, Chemical, and Biological Defense Regiment (20th pRChBZ , military unit 12102) is a tactical formation of the Ground Forces of the Russian Federation as part of the 1st Guards Tank Army. Its permanent deployment point is the village of Tsentralny in the Nizhny Novgorod Region.

== History ==
The regiment was formed on December 12, 2014. The unit's permanent base was the former military camp of the 16th Separate Training Regiment of the Railway Troops (military unit 10905) in the workers' settlement of Tsentralny in the Nizhny Novgorod Region. On December 26, 2015, Major General Mikhail Chernyshev, Chief of the NBC Protection Service of the Western Military District, presented the regiment with its battle flag.

From March 22 to May 7, 2020, specialists from the NBC Protection Troops participated in the fight against coronavirus infection in northern Italy and Serbia. The unit's military personnel also carried out special treatment of social facilities in the Nizhny Novgorod Region. The unit's personnel participated in rehearsals for solving emergency containment tasks associated with the threat of mass infection and the spread of viral infections.

In 2015 and 2024, the regiment's servicemen took part in the Victory Parade on Minin Square in Nizhny Novgorod.

The main training ground for the regiment's personnel is the Mulino training ground.

Since 2022, it has been taking part in Russia's invasion of Ukraine.

On April 27, 2026, by decree of the President of the Russian Federation, the regiment was awarded the honorary title of “ Guards ” for “mass heroism and bravery, fortitude and courage demonstrated by army personnel in combat operations to defend the Fatherland and state interests in armed conflicts”.

== Subordinate units ==
- 1st Battalion of Radiation, Chemical and Biological Defense
  - Radiation, chemical and biological reconnaissance company
  - 1st Special Processing Company
  - 2nd Special Processing Company
  - Support platoon
- 2nd Battalion of Radiation, Chemical and Biological Defense
- Flamethrower and aerosol countermeasures battalion
  - Aerosol countermeasures company
  - Flamethrower Company
  - Special vehicles company
  - Support platoon
- Evacuation and repair platoon
- Logistics Platoon
- Radio platoon
- Commandant's Platoon
- Medical center
- Laboratory
- Settlement and analytical group

== Equipment ==
- BRDM-2RKhB
- RHM-4 (RHM-4-01)
- RHM-6
- UAZ-469 RX
- ARS-14 based on ZIL-31N
- ARS-14-KM based on KAMAZ-43114
- TOS-1
- TMS-T
- KLP-10
- RAG -2M
- PRHM -D
- TDA-2K (TDA-2M, TDA-M, TDA-3A)
- KDA
- KRPP-2
- UAZ 39621
- UAZ Patriot
- MTO-AT
- REM-KL
