= 40th NBC Regiment (Russia) =

40th Guards Radiation, Chemical and Biological Defense Regiment
- Active: 2014 — present
- Country: Russia (2014–present)
- Branch: Russian Ground Forces
- Type: Regiment
- Role: NBC Protection
- Part of: 58th Guards Combined Arms Army
- Garrison/HQ: Arkohskaya
- Engagements: Russo-Ukrainian War

The 40th Radiation, Chemical, and Biological Defense Regiment (40th RCR, military unit 16383) is a formation of the Radiation, Chemical, and Biological Defense Troops of the Armed Forces of the Russian Federation. The regiment was formed in 2014. The regiment is part of the 58th Combined Arms Army of the Southern Military District.

The regiment's permanent home base is Troitskaya, Republic of Ingushetia. Since December 2018, the regiment's permanent home base has been Military Town 1B, located in Arkhonskaya, Republic of North Ossetia-Alania.

== History ==
The 40th Radiation, Chemical, and Biological Defense Regiment enables the 58th Combined Arms Army to perform the full range of radiation, chemical, and biological defense missions without the need for additional forces and assets. The unit includes radiation, chemical, and biological reconnaissance, special processing, aerosol countermeasure, and flamethrower units. The regiment can provide aerosol camouflage for troops and traverse contaminated terrain. Using automated dispensing stations, it can decontaminate weapons and special equipment contaminated with toxic substances.

On December 31, 2014, a ceremony was held to present the new model of the Battle Banner to the newly formed radiation, chemical and biological defense unit of the Southern Military District.

== Subordinate units ==
- 1st Battalion of Radiation, Chemical and Biological Defense
  - Radiation, chemical and biological reconnaissance company
  - 1st Special Processing Company
  - 2nd Special Processing Company
  - Support platoon
- 2nd Battalion of Radiation, Chemical and Biological Defense
- Flamethrower and aerosol countermeasures battalion
  - Aerosol countermeasures company
  - Flamethrower Company
  - Special vehicles company
  - Support platoon
- Evacuation and repair platoon
- Logistics Platoon
- Radio platoon
- Commandant's Platoon
- Medical center
- Laboratory
- Settlement and analytical group

== Equipment ==
- BRDM-2RKhB
- RHM-4 (RHM-4-01)
- RHM-6
- UAZ-469 RX
- ARS-14 based on ZIL-31N
- ARS-14-KM based on KAMAZ-43114
- TOS-1
- TMS-T
- KLP-10
- RAG -2M
- PRHM -D
- TDA-2K (TDA-2M, TDA-M, TDA-3A)
- KDA
- KRPP-2
- UAZ 39621
- UAZ Patriot
- MTO-AT
- REM-KL

The regiment is equipped with approximately 200 units of weapons, automobiles and special equipment.
