= 35th Guards NBC Regiment (Russia) =

35th Guards Radiation, Chemical and Biological Defense Regiment
- Active: 2014 — present
- Country: Russia (2018–present)
- Branch: Russian Ground Forces
- Type: Regiment
- Role: NBC Protection
- Part of: 35th Guards Combined Arms Army
- Garrison/HQ: Belogorsk
- Engagements: Russo-Ukrainian War * Battle of Donbass (2022)
- Decorations: Guards

The 35th Guards Radiation, Chemical and Biological Defense Regiment (35th RCR, military unit 59792) is a military unit of the Ground Forces of the Russian Federation.

The formation is part of the 35th Guards Combined Arms Army of the Eastern Military District. Its permanent deployment point is Belogorsk, Amur Region.

== History ==
The 35th Radiation, Chemical, and Biological Defense Regiment was formed on December 5, 2014. In 2018, it was redeployed to Belogorsk in the Amur Region.

The regiment's servicemen systematically carried out special tasks on the territory of the Syrian Arab Republic.

In 2020, specialists from the regiment actively participated in the fight against the coronavirus in cities across the Amur Region. The unit's personnel participated in emergency containment exercises involving the threat of mass infection and the spread of viral infections.

From the first days to the present day, the personnel of the 35th Guards Regiment of Radiation, Chemical and Biological Defense has been directly involved in the special military operation. They have been honorably and professionally performing all assigned combat and special missions to protect the civilian population of Donbass and the national sovereignty of Russia as part of the Vostok and Dnepr group of forces in the Zaporizhzhia, Artemovsk, and South Donetsk directions, demonstrating courage and bravery.

By decree of the president of the Russian Federation on March 3, 2025, for mass heroism and bravery, fortitude and courage demonstrated by the regiment's personnel in combat operations to defend the Fatherland, the 35th Radiation, Chemical and Biological Defense Regiment was awarded the honorary title of "Guards".

== Subordinate units ==
- 1st Battalion of Radiation, Chemical and Biological Defense
  - Radiation, chemical and biological reconnaissance company
  - 1st Special Processing Company
  - 2nd Special Processing Company
  - Support platoon
- 2nd Battalion of Radiation, Chemical and Biological Defense
- Flamethrower and aerosol countermeasures battalion
  - Aerosol countermeasures company
  - Flamethrower Company
  - Special vehicles company
  - Support platoon
- Evacuation and repair platoon
- Logistics Platoon
- Radio platoon
- Commandant's Platoon
- Medical center
- Laboratory
- Settlement and analytical group

== Equipment ==
- BRDM-2RKhB
- RHM-4 (RHM-4-01)
- RHM-6
- UAZ-469 RX
- ARS-14 based on ZIL-31N
- ARS-14-KM based on KAMAZ-43114
- TOS-1
- TMS-T
- KLP-10
- RAG -2M
- PRHM -D
- TDA-2K (TDA-2M, TDA-M, TDA-3A)
- KDA
- KRPP-2
- UAZ 39621
- UAZ Patriot
- MTO-AT
- REM-KL
