= 1st Guards NBC Protection Brigade =

1st Mobile NBC Protection Brigade (1989-present) 3rd Mobile Disaster Management Regiment (1986-1989) 122nd Mobile Detachment (1979-1986)
- Active: 1979-present
- Branch: Russian NBC Protection Troops
- Part of: Central Military District
- Garrison/HQ: Shikhany, Saratov Oblast

The 1st Guards Mobile NBC Protection Brigade is a military formation of the Russian Federation, part of the NBC Protection Troops. The unit is primarily tasked with CBRN defense but also offensive tasks related to flamethrowers as per Russian military doctrine, including the use of the TOS-1 rocket system (designated as a "heavy flamethrower" by Russia).

It is garrisoned in the Shikhany-2 facility in Shikhany, Saratov Oblast. The unit is subordinate to the Central Military District.

== History ==
The unit is the successor of the 122nd Mobile Detachment which was formed by the Soviet Union in 1979 and was heavily involved in the Chernobyl Disaster cleanup. In late 1986 the unit was reformed as the 3rd Mobile Disaster Management Regiment which in 1989 formed the basis of the 1st Mobile NBC Protection Brigade.

On January 25, 2024, the brigade was awarded the honorary title of "Guards" for mass heroism and bravery, fortitude and courage demonstrated by the brigade personnel in combat operations to defend the Fatherland and state interests in armed conflicts.
