= Field artillery (United States) =

Military group organized to direct and control artillery fire on the battlefield

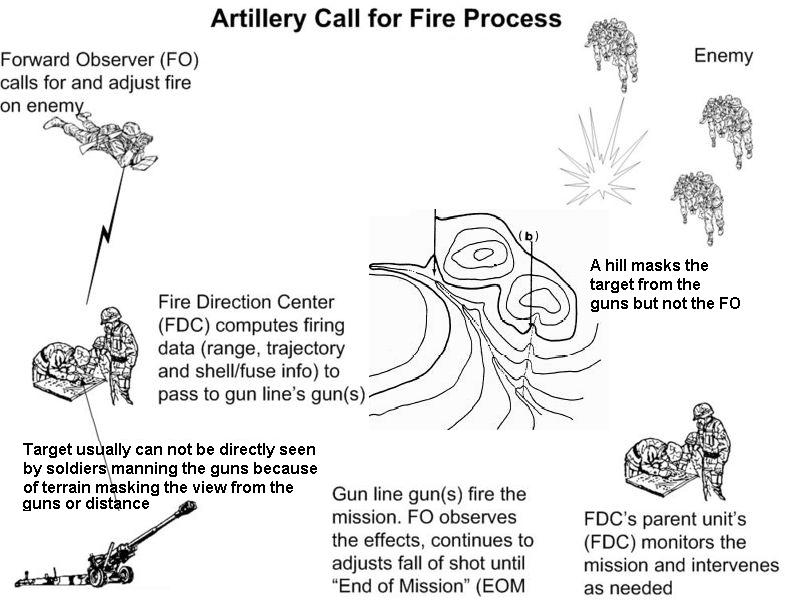
Calling in and adjusting artillery fire on a target

In the United States military, land-based field artillery typically consists of three distinct components: the forward observer (FO), the fire direction center (FDC), and the firing unit, sometimes referred to as the gun line. The field artillery fires process involves the coordination of all of these elements; for instance, there may be multiple FOs calling in fire on multiple targets to multiple FDCs and any component may be in communication with some of the other elements depending on the situational requirements.

== History ==
Modern artillery shoots at targets miles away, a hundredfold increase in range over 18th century guns, a result of development of rifled cannons, improvements in propellants, better communications, and technical improvements such as computing the aim. The enemy is engaged at such distances that soldiers manning the guns cannot see the target that they are firing upon. Since the target is not visible, these gunners have to rely on a trained artillery observer (also called a "forward observer"), who sees the target and relays its coordinates to their fire direction center. The fire direction center uses these coordinates to calculate the specific direction, elevation for the gun, the amount of propellant (modern guns can vary the amount used) and fuse settings which the gun crew use for their gun.

== Organization ==
=== Reconnaissance and advance party ===
An advance party finds suitable positions for an artillery unit to fire from prior to a fire mission. These typically consist of the battery commander, his driver, first sergeant, gunnery sergeant, FDC guide, gun guides, and communications representatives.

Then they perform "route reconnaissance", which determines the suitability of the route of the unit's movement. They consider alternate routes, cover, concealment, location of obstacles, likely ambush sites, contaminated areas, route marking requirements, and the time and distance required to traverse the route.

Once a location is chosen and having arrived at the new position, the advance party conducts a security sweep and prepares the position for occupation. The purpose of the advance party security with METT-T and the absence of enemy troops, mines, booby traps, NBC hazards, and so on. If these threats or conditions are present in the proposed position area, the advance party breaks contact with any enemy forces or marks minefield and hazards and moves on to find another position area.

The battery commander can coordinate for additional troops to clear areas of small enemy forces, obstacles, and minefields. Security is continuous throughout advance party operations. Once a location is determined to be safe, the advance party prepares the position for guns. This consists of several procedures, such as escorting each weapon to its prepared position, setting up communications, providing the unit with its initial elevation, and providing each gun with an initial deflection. This entire process is covered in U.S. Army Field Manual 6-50 Chapter 2.

=== Forward observer ===
The forward observer (FO) takes up a position where they can observe the target and using tools such as maps, a compass, binoculars and laser rangefinders/designators communicate the enemy's location. This position can be anywhere from a few hundred meters to 20–30 km distant from the guns. Modern day FOs in the US Army are also called "Fire Support Specialist"s trained in calling close air support, naval gunfire support and other indirect fire weapons systems.

Using a standardized format, the FO sends either an absolute position or a position relative to another point, a brief target description, a recommended munition to use, and any special instructions, such as "danger close" (a warning that friendly troops are close to the target, requiring extra precision from the guns). Firing begins with an adjustment phase where only a single gun fires, and if the rounds are not accurate, the FO will issue instructions to adjust fire in four dimensions (three spatial and one temporal). When the degree of accuracy is acceptable, the FO will then typically call "fire for effect", unless the objective of that fire mission is something other than suppression or destruction of the target. A "Fire For Effect" or "FFE" calls for all of the guns or tubes to fire a round.

The FO does not talk to the guns directly - he deals solely with the FDC. The forward observer can also be airborne; one of the original roles of aircraft in the military was airborne artillery spotting.

=== Fire direction center ===
The fire direction center (FDC) concept was developed at the Field Artillery School at Ft. Sill, Oklahoma, during the 1930s under the leadership of its Director of Gunnery, Carlos Brewer and his instructors, who abandoned massing fire by a described terrain feature or grid coordinate reference. They introduced a firing chart, adopted the practice of locating battery positions by survey, and designated targets with reference to the base point on the chart. In the spring of 1931, the Gunnery Department successfully demonstrated massing battalion fire using this method, which was used extensively by field artillery during World War II.

Typically, there is one FDC for a battery of six guns, in a light division. In a typical heavy division configuration, there exists two FDC elements capable of operating two four gun sections, also known as a split battery. The FDC computes firing data, fire direction, for the guns. The process consists of determining the precise target location based on the observer's location if needed, then computing range and direction to the target from the guns' location. This data can be computed manually, using special protractors and slide rules with precomputed firing data. Corrections can be added for conditions such as a difference between target and howitzer altitudes, propellant temperature, atmospheric conditions, and even the curvature and rotation of the Earth. In most cases, some corrections are omitted, sacrificing accuracy for speed. In recent decades, FDCs have become computerized, allowing for much faster and more accurate computation of firing data.

=== Firing unit ===
The FDC will transmit a warning order to the firing unit, followed by orders specifying the type of ammunition, fuze setting and propelling charge, bearing, elevation, and the method of adjustment or orders for fire for effect (FFE). Elevation (vertical direction) and bearing orders are specified in mils, and any special instructions, such as to wait for the observer's command to fire relayed through the FDC. The crews load the howitzers and traverse and elevate the tube to the required point, using either hand cranks (usually on towed guns) or hydraulics (on self-propelled models).

== Parent battalion and US Army brigade/USMC regimental FDCs ==
FDCs also exist in the next-higher parent battalion that "owns" 2–4 artillery batteries. Once again, an FDC exists at the US Army brigade or USMC regimental level that "owns" the battalions. These higher-level FDCs monitor the fire missions of their subordinate units and will coordinate the use of multiple batteries or even multiple battalions in what is called a battalion or brigade/regimental mission. In training and wartime exercises, as many as 72 guns from three battalions may all be coordinated to put "steel on the target" in what is called a "brigade/regimental time on target" or brigade/regimental TOT for short. The rule is "silence is consent", meaning that if the lower unit does not hear a "cancel the mission" (don't shoot) or even a "check firing" (cease firing) order from the higher monitoring unit, then the mission goes on. Higher-level units monitor their subordinate unit's missions for both active as well as passive purposes. Higher level units also may get involved to coordinate artillery fire across fire support coordination boundaries (often parallel lines on maps) where one unit can not fire into without permission from higher and/or adjacent units that "own" the territory.

== Direct fire exceptions to usual mission of artillery indirect fire ==
Artillery gunners are taught how to use direct fire to engage a target such as mounted or dismounted troops attacking them. In such a case, however, the artillery crews are able to see what they are shooting at. With indirect fire, in normal artillery missions, the crews manning the guns cannot see their target directly, or observers are doing that work for them. There have been exceptions to this situation, but even when US Marines assaulted Iwo Jima during World War Two, and gunners could see the impact of their rounds on Mount Suribachi, the actual adjustment of their fire was accomplished by forward observers directly supporting and attached to infantry units, because they were in the position not only to see the enemy but to prevent friendly fire incidents and to coordinate shelling the Japanese with their infantry unit's movements.

== See also ==
- Field Artillery Branch (United States)
- Fire discipline
- Fire support coordination element
