= Viktor Bedrik =

Russian military officer

Major general Viktor Bedrik
- Allegiance: Russia
- Branch: Russian NBC Protection Troops
- Rank: Major general
- Commands: Military Commander of Kherson military–civilian administration
- Conflicts: Russo-Ukrainian War

Viktor Leonidovich Bedrik (Russian: Виктор Леонидович Бедрик) is a Russian military officer, currently serving as military head of the Kherson military-civilian administration.

== Career ==
In 2022, he took part in the 2022 Russian invasion of Ukraine. In early March, he was appointed Military Commandant of the occupied Kherson Oblast.

Sanctioned by Canada on 29 September 2022 for enabling and supporting President Putin's sham referendums.

On 8 December 2023, Bedrik was promoted to the rank of Major general.
