= Danger Close =

Danger Close may refer to:

- A call for fire in directing artillery
- Danger Close: The Battle of Long Tan, a 2019 Australian film
- Danger Close Games, a defunct development studio of Electronic Arts
- "Danger Close" (The Punisher), an episode of The Punisher
