= Fire management =

Fire management may refer to:

- Fire prevention, preventing unwanted fires such as house fires, forest fires, and industrial fires
- Fire control, preventing unwanted spread of fires
- Fire § Fire management, the skilled modulation of a fire for cooking, heating, or smithing purposes

== See also ==
- Fire discipline, which directs military shooting
  - Fire-control system, which directs military shooting
  - Field artillery § Fire direction center
  - Director (military), for artillery direction
- Control of fire by early humans
