= Elevation (ballistics) =

Angle in ballistics

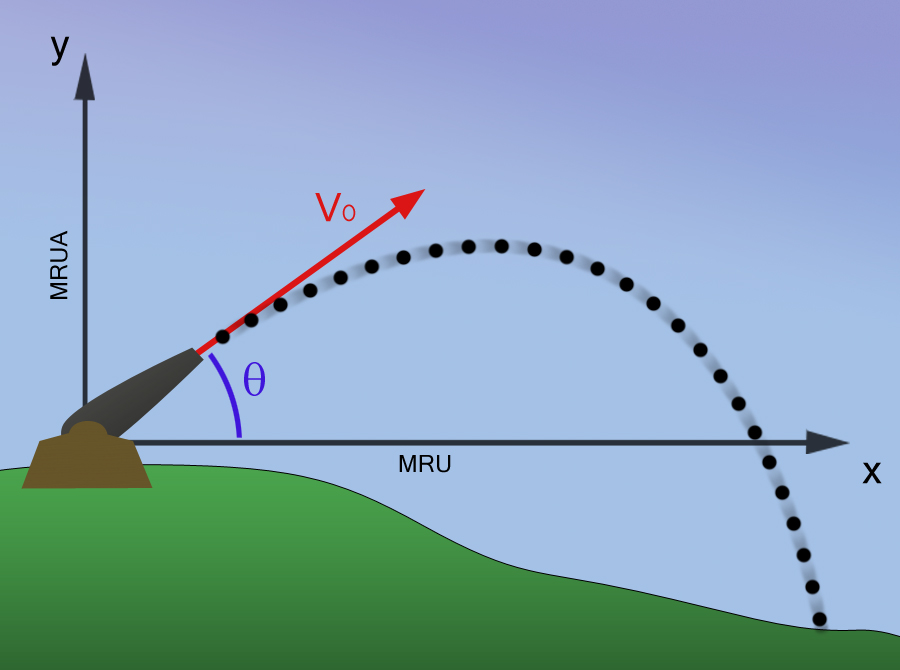

In ballistics, the elevation is the angle between the horizontal plane and the axial direction of the barrel of a gun, mortar or heavy artillery. Originally, elevation was a linear measure of how high the gunners had to physically lift the muzzle of a gun up from the gun carriage to compensate for projectile drop and hit targets at a certain distance.

== Until WWI ==
Though early 20th-century firearms were relatively easy to fire, artillery was not. Before and during World War I, the only way to effectively fire artillery was plotting points on a plane.

Most artillery units seldom employed their guns in small numbers. Instead of using pin-point artillery firing they used old means of "fire for effect" using artillery en masse. This tactic was employed successfully by past armies.

By World War I, reasonably accurate artillery fire was possible even at long range requiring significant elevation. However, artillery tactics used in previous wars were carried on, and still had similar success where great accuracy was not required. Large warships such as battleships carried large-caliber guns that needed to be elevated above the direct point of aim for firing accurately at small targets at long range.

== From WWII ==
As time passed on, more accurate artillery guns were developed in a range of sizes. Some small artillery pieces were used at high elevations as mortars, medium-sized guns were used on tanks as well as fixed positions, and the largest guns became long-range land batteries and battleship armaments.

With the introduction of better tanks in World War II, elevation had to be taken into account by tank gunners, which had to aim through the Gunner's Auxiliary Sights (GAS) or even through iron sights. At shorter ranges the high velocity of tank and other munitions made elevation less of an issue.

During World War II artillery fire-control systems (FCS) were introduced, improving the effectiveness of artillery fire.

With advances in the 21st century, it has become easy to determine how much elevation a gun needed to hit a target. The laser rangefinder and computer-based FCS make guns highly accurate.

== Superelevation ==
When firing a missile such as a MANPADS at an aircraft target, superelevation is an additional angle of elevation above the angle sighted on which corrects for the effect of gravity on the missile.

== See also ==
- Altitude (astronomy)
- Pitching moment
