= Vladimir Pikalov =

Soviet general (1924–2003)

Vladimir Karpovich Pikalov
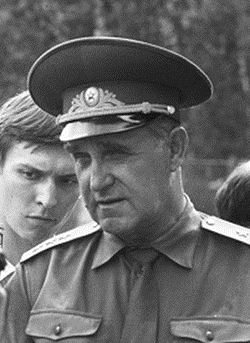
- Pikalov in 1986 at Chernobyl
- Born: 15 September 1924; Armavir, South-Eastern Oblast, Russian SFSR, USSR
- Died: 29 March 2003 (aged 78); Moscow, Russia
- Burial place: Donskoye Cemetery
- Military career
- Allegiance: Soviet Union (1941–1991); Russia (1991–1992)
- Service years: 1941–1989
- Rank: Colonel General
- Commands: Chemical Troops of the USSR
- Conflicts: World War II; Battle of Stalingrad; Battle of Moscow; Battle of Kursk; Chernobyl disaster
- Awards: Hero of the Soviet Union (1986)

Vladimir Karpovich Pikalov (Russian: Владимир Карпович Пикалов; 15 September 1924 – 29 March 2003) was a Soviet general. He commanded the Chemical Troops of the USSR from 1968 to 1988.

During World War II, Pikalov took part in the battles of Moscow, Stalingrad and Kursk. He was wounded several times.

He was in charge of the specialized military units at the site of the Chernobyl disaster. Pikalov arrived at the scene on the afternoon of 26 April 1986, and assumed command at Chernobyl.

== Life ==
Pikalov was born on 15 September 1924 in Armavir, now in Krasnodar Krai, into the family of a civil servant. From 1931 until May 1941 he studied in Kislovodsk secondary school number 7. Mariya Maksimovna Pikalova, his mother, died in 1973, and was buried in Moscow. His father, Karp Ivanovich Pikalov, died in 1974 and was buried in Armavir.

At the Axis invasion of the Soviet Union, Pikalov was in 9th grade. In May 1941, he entered the 1st Artillery School in Rostov-on-Don, at which he graduated from an accelerated course in February 1942. He took part in the Second World War, seeing combat with the Western, Don, Stalingrad, the Steppe and the 2nd Belorussian fronts, participating in the liberation of Kursk, Minsk, Poznań, and as well as the storming of Berlin. He was wounded three times. He fought in artillery as a platoon commander, battery commander, assistant chief of staff of artillery division on reconnaissance, adjutant of a senior artillery division, reconnaissance officer of the regiment.

In August 1945 he entered the Voroshilov Higher Military Artillery School, from which he graduated in 1952 with a diploma of military engineer-chemist. He served as chief of the chemical service of the division, senior officer, deputy and chief of chemical troops of the military district, deputy chief of the military academy of education and research. A member of the All-Union Communist Party (Bolsheviks) since 1949.

From August 1966 to June 1968 Pikalov attended the Military Academy of the General Staff. From March 1968 to December 1988 he served as head of the Chemical Troops of the USSR Ministry of Defense. Pikalov arrived at the disaster site at the Chernobyl nuclear power plant a few hours after the April 1986 explosion as head of the Ministry of Defense task force, personally made a circuit around the nuclear power plant with radiation instruments (receiving an estimated effective dose of 1.37 sieverts or 137 rems), and organized the arrival in the accident zone of the troops necessary for the most urgent work. He headed the Ministry of Defense relief work at the Chernobyl site until Army General Ivan Gerasymov, Commander-in-Chief of the Troops of the Southwestern Direction, relieved him.

Pikalov died on 29 March 2003. He was buried with his family in the columbarium of the Donskoye Cemetery.

== Recognition ==
In December 1986, he was awarded the title of the Hero of the Soviet Union, for his role in the containment of the fallout from the Chernobyl catastrophe.

== Cultural depictions ==
Pikalov was portrayed by actor Mark Lewis Jones in Chernobyl.

== See also ==
- Individual involvement in the Chernobyl disaster
