= Shikhany =

Town in Saratov Oblast, Russia

Shikhany Шиханы
- Closed town
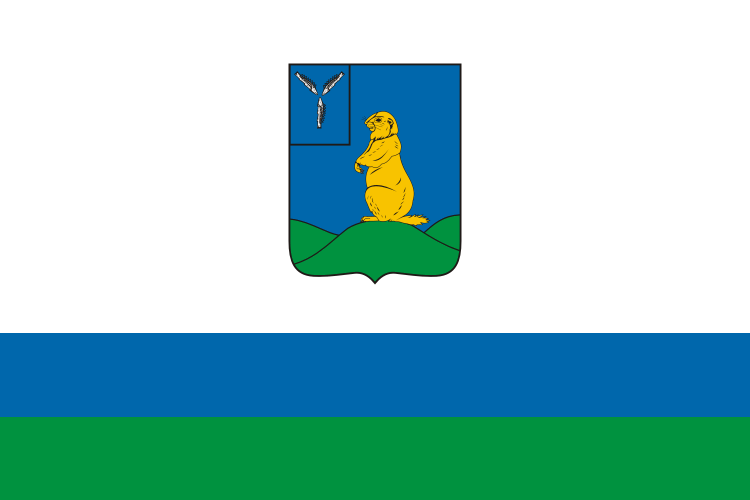
- Flag Coat of arms
- Interactive map of Shikhany
- Location of Shikhany Shikhany (Saratov Oblast)
- Coordinates: 52°07′N 47°12′E
- Country: Russia
- Federal subject: Saratov Oblast
- Founded: 1928
- Closed town status since: 1996
- Elevation: 210 m (690 ft)

Population (2010 Census)
  - Total: 6,067
  - Estimate (2025): 4,775 (−21.3%)

Administrative status
  - Subordinated to: closed administrative-territorial formation of Shikhany
  - Capital of: closed administrative-territorial formation of Shikhany

Municipal status
  - Urban okrug: Shikhany Urban Okrug
  - Capital of: Shikhany Urban Okrug
- Time zone: UTC+4 (MSK+1)
- Postal code: 412950
- OKTMO ID: 63746000001

Shikhany, also spelled Shikhansky (Russian: Шиханы) is a closed town in Saratov Oblast, Russia, 130 kilometers (81 mi) north of Saratov on the right bank of the Volga River Population: 6,067 (2010 census); 6,738 (2002 census); 12,763 (1989 Soviet census).. It has been a closed town since 1997, but lost this status on 1 January 2019. The town is 2 kilometres from the major chemical weapons base Shikhany-2 (previously known as Vol'sk-18).

== History ==
The original settlement at Shikhany was founded in 1820 as part of the estate of Count Vasily Vasil'evich Orlov-Denisov. The first school was opened at the site in 1876. By 1917, there were still only five inhabitants resident in two houses. The subsequent expansion of the settlement was presumably a consequence of the opening of the adjacent chemical warfare establishment. On 30 June 1997, the town was transformed by an edict of President Yeltsin into a Closed Administrative-Territorial Formation (ZATO). Under the terms of this edict, travel to Shikhany was restricted and special police, procuracy and courts operated directly under Moscow jurisdiction. This status was revoked on 1 January 2019.

The town comprises Shikhany-1, the town proper, Shikhany-2, the military chemical base, and Shikhany-4, the arsenal. Shikhany-4 appears to be the location of the 115th Arsenal of the Russian Radiation, Chemical and Biological Protection Troops.

=== Shikhany-2 (Vol'sk-18) ===
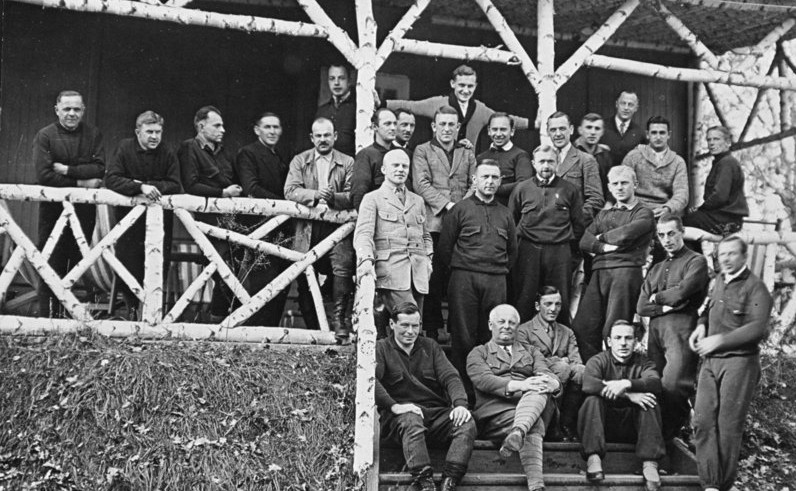
German personnel participating in the secret Tomka Project at Shikhany, 1928

The military chemical base at Shikany-2 (previously known as Vol'sk-18) has a long history. At the end of 1927, a secret Soviet–German agreement was reached concerning the construction of a joint chemical warfare experimental establishment at the site. Under the Versailles Treaty, Germany was forbidden from undertaking tests with chemical warfare agents or developing associated delivery systems. Collaboration with the Soviet Union was viewed as a useful means of concealing such activities from the eyes of the Western allies. The Shikhany-2 site was located 15 kilometres from the town of Vol'sk. It had been selected as early as 1924 to become a centre of Soviet chemical warfare activities. Under the terms of the agreement with the Germans, the Tomka project was created with the aim of both producing chemical weapons and operating experimental establishments at the site. The main focus of the Tomka project was on mustard gas, the climate at Shikhany being well suited for studying the field behaviours of the gas. Studies were also made of its toxicology. Stores for the joint project, including huts for accommodation, were transferred from Berlin to Shikhany. By the summer of 1928, chemical warfare field trials were fully underway. During the period through to 1931, around thirty German staff were based at Shikhany. The Tomka project was terminated in the spring of 1933.

After the departure of the German scientists, the Soviet military remained at the Shikhany-2 site, and the proving grounds and other facilities were now officially designated as the Central Army Chemical Proving Ground (TsVKhP). The area of the site increased from its original 100 square kilometres to 600 square kilometres by 1938. A further expansion in size took place in 1941–1942, by which time the site occupied 1,000 square kilometres. By 1940, Shikhany incorporated large laboratories occupying nine to ten buildings, workshops, garages, stalls for animals, barracks, a building for the commander and his subordinates, an airfield with hangars, a gas school with spacious instruction halls, a military hospital and buildings for the production of chemical warfare agents. The staff at this time comprised a Major General, 100 other officers, 850 non-commissioned officers and 250 scientists and related personnel. During the Second World War, Soviet POWs who had been employed at Shikhany revealed to German intelligence that trials had been undertaken during the period 1939–1943 to test the dispersion of various chemical warfare agents in aerial bombs and aircraft sprayers. Beginning in 1934, trials were also conducted in great secrecy of simulants of biological weapons at Shikhany. Soviet POWs revealed to their German captors that these BW trials continued through to at least December 1940.

On 6 August 1987, chemical weapons negotiators at the Conference on Disarmament in Geneva were invited to visit the Soviet military chemical establishment at Shikhany. During the period 3–4 October 1987, Colonel General Vladimir Karpovich Pikalov hosted foreign disarmament negotiators at the proving ground. The guests are reported to have been shown a range of chemical munitions and during their visit a rabbit was injected with sarin extracted from a bomb to demonstrate that it was real. The rabbit is reported to have died instantly and then the weapon was destroyed.

The following institutions and military units are currently reported to be located within Shikhany-2: the USSR Ministry of Defence's Order of the Red Banner of Labour 33rd Central Scientific-Research Experimental Institute (33rd TsNII); the proving ground of the 33rd TsNII; the 16th Central Military Clinical Hospital; Secondary School No. 44 of the Russian Ministry of Defence; School of Music; 2 kindergartens; 2 hotels; and officers quarters including a cinema. In 2004 a branch was opened in Shikhany-2 of Moscow's Contemporary Humanitarian Academy. The 1st Mobile Brigade (ru:1-я мобильная бригада РХБ защиты) of the Russian NBC Protection Troops is based at the site. There is a well-developed infrastructure at the base including access to a cable TV network and the internet, a café, nine grocery stores, three department stores, a post office and a branch of Russia's Sberbank, a sports centre incorporating a gym and swimming pool, a football pitch and ice hockey rink.

== Administrative and municipal status ==
Within the framework of administrative divisions, it is incorporated as the closed administrative-territorial formation of Shikhany—an administrative unit with the status equal to that of the districts. As a municipal division, the closed administrative-territorial formation of Shikhany is incorporated as Shikhany Urban Okrug.

== Allegations concerning Shikhany-2 as source of novichok agent ==
Based upon a report submitted by Russia to the Organisation for the Prohibition of Chemical Weapons (OPCW), a British chemical weapons expert indicated that Shikhany was the source of the novichok agent used in the 2018 poisoning of Sergei Skripal and his daughter. However, a chemical weapons site in Uzbekistan that was dismantled and decontaminated in 1999 may have been used to originally produce and test the agent.

== See also ==
- Video Footage of Shikhany
- Shihan
