= Fire for effect =

Military term for calibrated artillery fire

Fire for effect (or FFE) is a military term. According to NATO doctrine:

1. Fire which is delivered after the mean point of impact or burst is within the desired distance of the target or adjusting/ranging point.
2. Term in a call for fire to indicate the adjustment/ranging is satisfactory and fire for effect is desired.

According to United States Department of Defense, it is "that volume of fires delivered on a target to achieve the desired effect.”

Artillery firing is often calibrated with spotting rounds and a process of adjustment of fire. Once calibrated upon the desired target or bracketed area, a call for "fire for effect" is made requesting several batteries or the battalion to fire one or more rounds with the goal of saturating the target area with shell fragments.

In practice, first the Forward Observer (FO) establishes communication with the artillery unit. Then a spotting round is called for. Spotting rounds are then "walked" on to the target. When the spotting round is either on the target or the necessary adjustment is small enough to be within allowable limits, the FO calls for a fire mission, often with the phrase, "Fire for effect." If the first fire mission does not reduce the position or change the tactical situation sufficiently, other fire missions may be called for.

Ideally the observations of the FO will be accurate enough to dispense with any ranging rounds. This maximizes surprise and also limits the opportunity for the enemy to discover the position of the battery while saving ammunition. When ranging rounds are needed, surprise can be preserved using an "auxiliary adjusting point.” This point should be an equal range from the battery as the target point but along a different azimuth. Once the chosen auxiliary point is hit, the range is dialed in and the switch can easily be made to the target point (error is usually greater in the range component). Care must be taken that the auxiliary point is far enough from the target to obscure the real purpose.

== See also ==
- Field artillery
- Field artillery (United States)
- Final protective fire
- Suppressive fire
- Time on target

== External links and sources ==
- Fire coordination area
- Fire capabilities chart
- CHAPTER 7 SPECIAL OBSERVER MISSIONS This chapter implements STANAG 2934, Chapter 5 and QSTAG 246. 7-1. AERIAL FIRE SUPPORT OBSERVER
