= Ural-5323 =

Russian military heavy-duty off-road truck

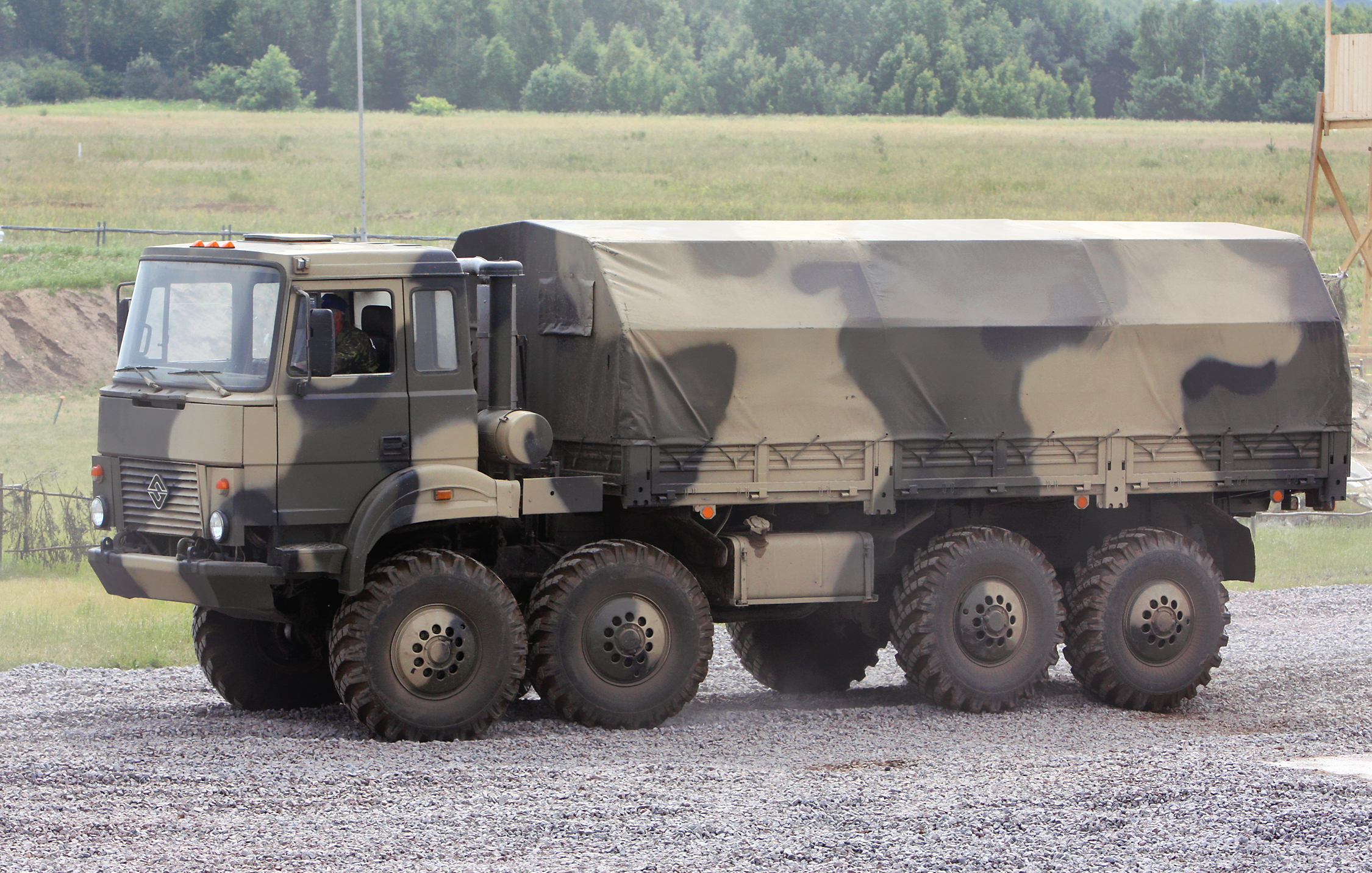
Ural-5323

The Ural-5323 is an 8×8 heavy-duty off-road truck specially designed for army service. It has been produced since 1989 by the Ural Automotive Plant located in Miass, Russia.

The Ural-5323 is a platform for the Pantsir-S1 gun-missile Air Defense System.

The Ural-5323-20, with its 8x8 wheel configuration, is designed to carry cargo weighing up to 10 tons and tow trailers with a full weight up to 16 tons.

The military version differs from the civilian version as its headlights are located on the cab. Civilian versions are sold with headlights located in the bumper.

Earlier versions were equipped with cabs from Kamaz, which complicated production and were less suitable than the replacement Iveco cabs which were provided after 2000.

military version	civilian version

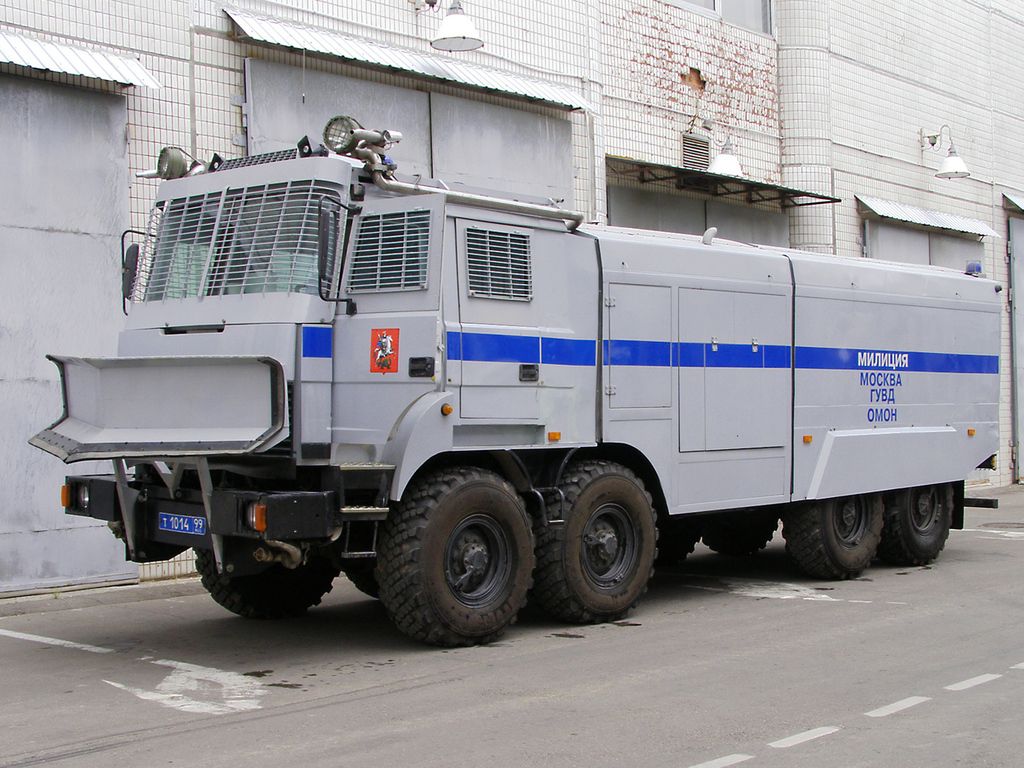
Moscow OMON riot control water cannon "Lavina-Uragan" on Ural-532362, 2011.

== Users ==
- Azerbaijan
- Russia

== Specifications ==
- Units hermetization system
- Remote tire pressure control.
- Payload: 26,456 lb (12,000 kg).
- Drive: 8×8.
- Suspension: dependent, solid axles with leaf springs, rear - solid axles on balance-cart. rear - solid axles on balance-cart.
- Engine: YaMZ-238B type - V8 turbo-diesel, ohv, displacement 14,866 cc (bore 5.12", stroke 5.51"). *Puts out 300 hp (220 kW) @ 2,000 rpm.
- Torque 885 lb⋅ft (1,200 N⋅m) @ 1,200...1,400 rpm.
- Gearbox: 8×2 speed, locking transaxle differential.
- Top speed: 53 mph (85 km/h).
- Wheelbase: 9'0.3"+4'7.1".
- Cargo platform size: 18'7.8"×7'7.7"×.3'3.4".
- Maneuverability: turning circle 85.3', max. ascent angle 31 deg., hillside: 20 deg., ground clearance 15.7 in (400 mm), overcome ford: 3 ft 11 in (1.19 m), overcome trench 3'11". Brakes: drums, with air-hydraulic control. Full weight: 47,245 lb (21,430 kg), max.
- Towing weight: 35,274 lb (16,000 kg).
- Fuel tanks: 79.3 + 55.5 gal.
- Range: 650 miles (1,046 km).
- Tyres: 14.00-20 146G.
- Pressure: controlled.
