= Fire support coordination element =

US army formation term

A fire support coordination element (FSCE) is a term used in the US Army to identify an element of military formation or unit organisation in which functions are directly related to positioning weapons and delivering their fire onto targets. The term is most often associated with artillery, but is sometimes used for mortar fire.

During the Vietnam War, the element, which included about five officers and nine enlisted personnel, collected and assessed information provided by the forward observers, field unit liaison officers, AN/TPS-25 surveillance radar section, division artillery air section, visual airborne target locator section, and the AN/MPQ-4 countermortar radar section (one in each direct support battalion).

The duties of fire support coordinator for the division are normally performed by the division artillery commander, who works closely with the G-2 Intelligence section of the division to identify enemy targets.
