= Fire discipline =

Methods of communication for controlling artillery

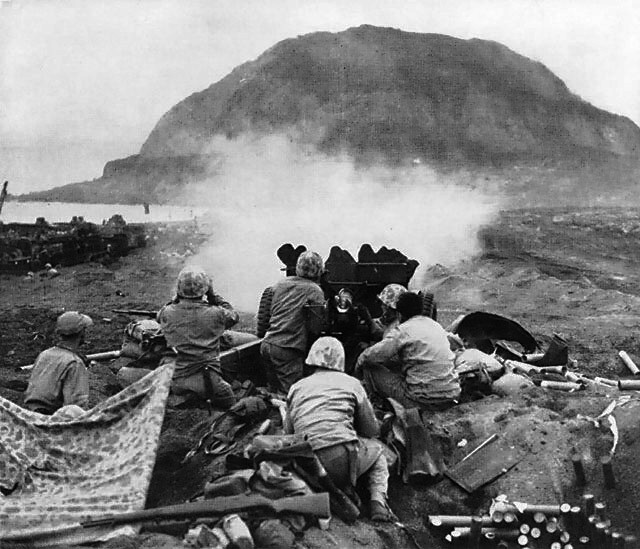
US 37mm gunners fire against Japanese cave positions at Iwo Jima.

Fire discipline is a system of communication in the military, primarily for directing artillery. By definition, fire discipline is the language of fire control. It consists of words, phrases, rules and conventions which have specific meanings and which result in some definite action at the guns. All ranks concerned in fire control must be thoroughly familiar with the language and the resulting actions. The aim of fire discipline is to ensure that in response to calls for fire (from a forward observer), the appropriate action is taken at the FPC (future planning cell), FSCC (fire support coordination center), FDC (fire direction center) and at the Guns/MRL, strictly in accordance with the intentions of the originator and with the minimum of delay.

== Six elements of a call for fire ==
An initial call for fire (to an artillery battery) consists of six elements:

- Observer identification
- Warning order
- Target location
- Target description
- Method of engagement
- Method of fire and control

== Call for fire ==
In the United States military, artillery is usually brought into play when a forward observer sends a three-part "call for fire". While there are many "missions" available, the most common in a wartime scenario is the basic "adjust fire":

Fire missions are started with a warning stating the observer identification (call sign) and the type of mission to be fired: "M10, this is G35, adjust fire, over."

The next radio transmission will be from the artillery battery, mirroring what was sent: "G35, this is M10, adjust fire, out."

The forward observer then sends a six-digit Military Grid Reference System (MGRS) grid coordinate with a 100-metre grid square identifier: "Grid ES 923 945, over".

The forward observer will always get a reply mirroring what was originally sent: "Grid ES 923 945, out."

The last element is the description of the target, and optionally, method of engagement and method of fire and control: "Two BMPs and 20 enemy dismounted infantry in the open, over."

The phrase "in the open" is the degree of protection of the target. If the forward observer does not specify the method of engagement and the method of fire and control, the Fire Direction Center will choose the ammunition type and fusing, be it for a target in foxholes or dug in, in dense foliage or in a bunker.

=== Danger close ===
If the forward observer or any friendly troops are within 600 metres of the impact point, to keep themselves safe, the forward observer declares "danger close" in this last element.

Danger close ranges

- 600 metres, generally
- 750 metres, naval guns 5-inch and under
- 1000 metres, naval guns over 5"
- 2000 metres, naval 16" ICM
- 2000 metres, MLRS M26 rockets

"Two BMPs and 20 enemy dismounts in the open, out."

The next step would be for the Fire Direction Centre (FDC) to send an MTO (Message To Observer) describing what ammunition will be used, what gun is shooting the spotting rounds, and what guns will fire the actual mission. The identifiers are the last letter of the call sign for the gun and battery in question (one gun adjusts, the next call sign fires the actual fire for effect) and how many shells each gun fires in the mission. For example, if there are three guns in the battery, the FDC decides that each fires five rounds, that means fifteen rounds will be fired: "R, F, DPICM in effect, 5 rounds, over." (DPICM stands for Dual-Purpose Improved Conventional Munition)

The forward observer would reply: "R, F, DPICM in effect, 5 rounds out."

The FDC will then send the mission out to the individual guns to fire. After the guns are loaded and oriented, the mission is fired.

The FDC will then send "Shot, over", to which the forward observer replies "Shot, out". This indicates that the guns have fired. Corrections to the transmission are possible at any time up to this point. After shot is called, the rounds are on the way and any corrections or retractions are impossible.

The FDC will then send a warning that the rounds are five seconds from impact, so that the forward observer may observe the impact of the rounds for adjustment: "Splash, over" the reply is "Splash, out".

Sometimes, the initial target location might be off. This is why the mission is called "Adjust fire": the forward observer has the chance to adjust where the final impact will be when the full battery fires on the target.

The first step for adjustment is to send the FO's direction to the target in mils and the correction in metres: "Direction 2500, add 100, left 150, over" Direction is rounded to the nearest 10 mils. To increase the range, the FO sends ADD, to decrease the FO uses DROP. "Direction 2500, add 100, left 150, out."

Assuming the FO's spotting round lands within the effective radius of the munitions, the FO would then send the command: "Fire for effect, over".

The proper reply to this would be: "Fire for effect, out." After this, the FO would then receive another MTO, another "Shot" and "Splash" notification.

Again, however, things might not go as planned; the rounds fired might not be sufficient to destroy the target. The FO would then send the proword "Repeat, over."

The proword "repeat" is never used anywhere on a radio but when communicating that a forward observer wants the previous artillery battery to fire the mission again. "Repeat, out."

Assuming allied forces have destroyed the target, the FO would then send an end of mission report such as: "M10, this is G35, End of mission: 2 BMPs destroyed, estimate 25 casualties, over."

The battery would then reply: "G35 this is M10, End of mission, 2 BMPs destroyed, estimate 25 casualties, out."

There are many different missions. The last-ditch mission is "immediate suppression" or final protective fire: Every gun in any concerned battery immediately fires whatever round and fuse is loaded, possibly from someone else's, or more than one callsign's mission. The FO may end up getting parachute flares, white phosphorus illumination, DPICM, and VT-HE rounds on the target in the same shot.
