= Russian NBC Protection Troops =

Combat Arm of the Russian Ground Forces for NBC defence

Troops of Radiological, Chemical and Biological Defence
- Войска радиационной, химической и биологической защиты Вооружённых сил Российской Федерации (Войска РХБ защиты ВС РФ)
- Great emblem of the Russian NBC Protection Troops
- Active: 13 November 1918 – present
- Country: Russia
- Branch: Russian Armed Forces
- Type: CBRN defense
- Role: Radiological, Chemical and Biological Defence
- Part of: Ministry of Defense
- Engagements: Russian intervention in the Syrian civil war; Russo-Ukrainian war

Commanders
- Current commander: Major General Rtizhev Alexei Viktorovich

Insignia
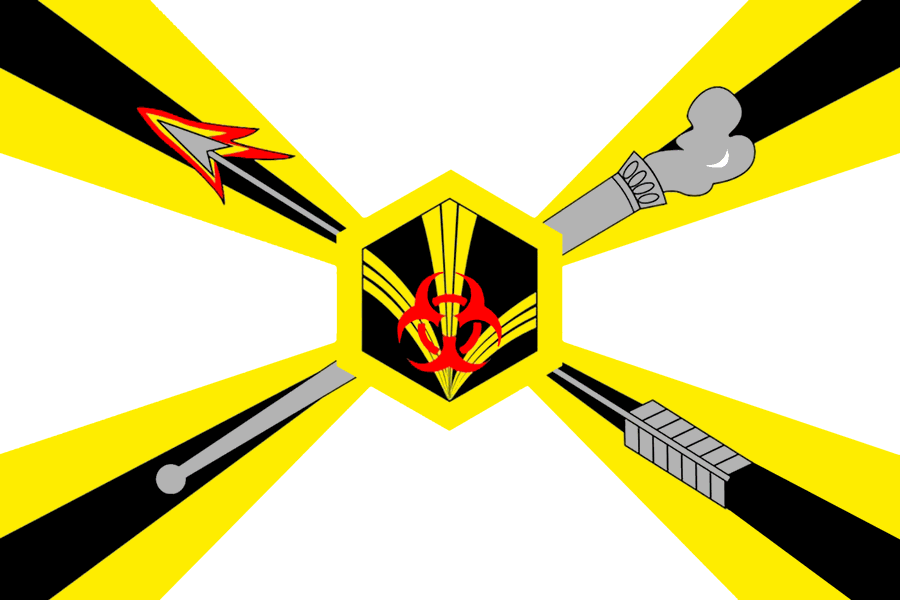
- Flag

The Troops of Radiological, Chemical and Biological Defence of the Russian Armed Forces (Russian: Войска радиационной, химической и биологической защиты Вооружённых сил Российской Федерации, abbr. Войска РХБ защиты ВС РФ, romanized: Voyska radiatsionnoy khimicheskoy i biologicheskoy zashchiti Vooruzhyonnykh sil Rossiyskoy Federatsii, Voyska RKhB zashchiti VS RF) are an organisation designed to reduce the losses of the Ground Forces and ensuring their combat tasks assigned during operations in conditions of radioactive, chemical and biological contamination, as well as at enhancing their survivability and protection against high-precision and other weapons.

== History ==
Though the units of chemical warfare first appeared since World War I, Soviet Russia's first chemical troops were formed on November 13, 1918, and throughout their first few years would include participation in major battles of the Russian Civil War.

In 1944, the Red Army's Chemical Troops had 19 brigades (14 technical and five chemical protection). After the end of World War II, most of them were disbanded.

General Major Vladimir Pikalov (promoted to Colonel General by 1975) commanded the Chemical Troops of the Ministry of Defence from March 1968 to December 1988. He was in charge of the specialised military units at the site of the Chernobyl Nuclear Power Plant disaster. Pikalov arrived at the scene on the afternoon of 26 April 1986, and assumed command of the specialised military units there. General Pikalov was later made a Hero of the Soviet Union for his actions there.

Among the 23 brigades of the Chemical Troops in the late 1980s were the 1st Brigade at Shikhany-2 (Vol'sk-18), two kilometres from Shikhany, in the Saratov Oblast of the Volga Military District, 2nd Brigade at Teikovo in the Moscow Military District, 3rd, 4th, 6th, 8th, 11th, 12th, 16th, 18th, 19th, 20th, 21st, 22nd, 23rd, 25th, 26th, 27th, 28th, and the 29th located in Severodonetsk in the Kyiv Military District.

In 1992, the Chemical Troops within the Russian Armed Forces were renamed the NBC Protection Troops.

Shikhany-2, the military chemical base, and Shikhany-4, the arsenal, are located in Saratov Oblast. Shikhany-4 appears to be the location of the 115th Arsenal of the Radiation, Chemical and Biological Protection Troops.

On 17 December 2024, the Commander of the RKhB Defence Troops, lieutenant general Igor Kirillov, was killed in a bombing in Moscow.

On 2 May 2026, Stanislav Petrov, former chief of the RKhB from 1992 to 2001 committed suicide, aged 87.

== Structure and tasks ==
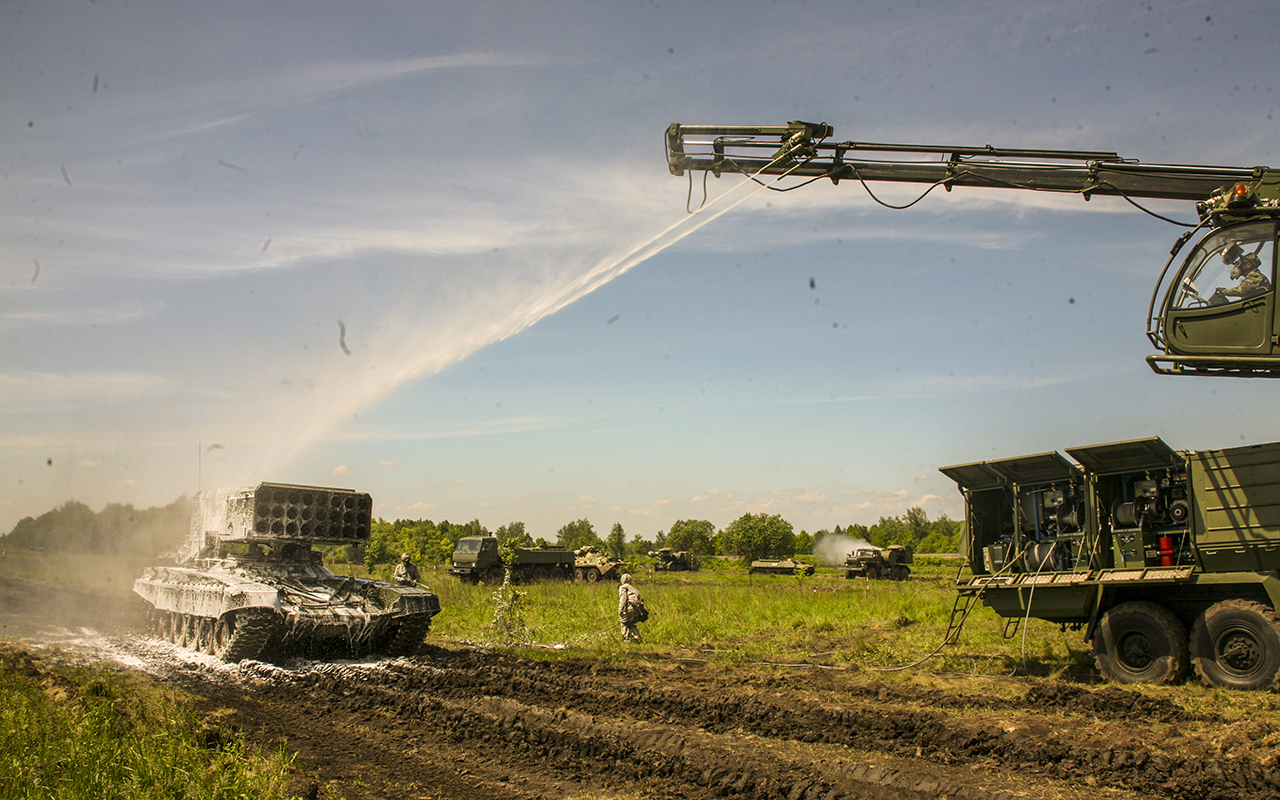
A UTM-80M heat treatment machine cleans a TOS-1 Buratino heavy flamethrower MLRS. NBC Protection Troops shock troops from the 27th Separate Brigade of NBC Protection, during training with the support of motorized rifle, tank and artillery units of the 20th Guards Combined Arms Army, liberated the "captured" city in conditions of radiation contamination of the area.

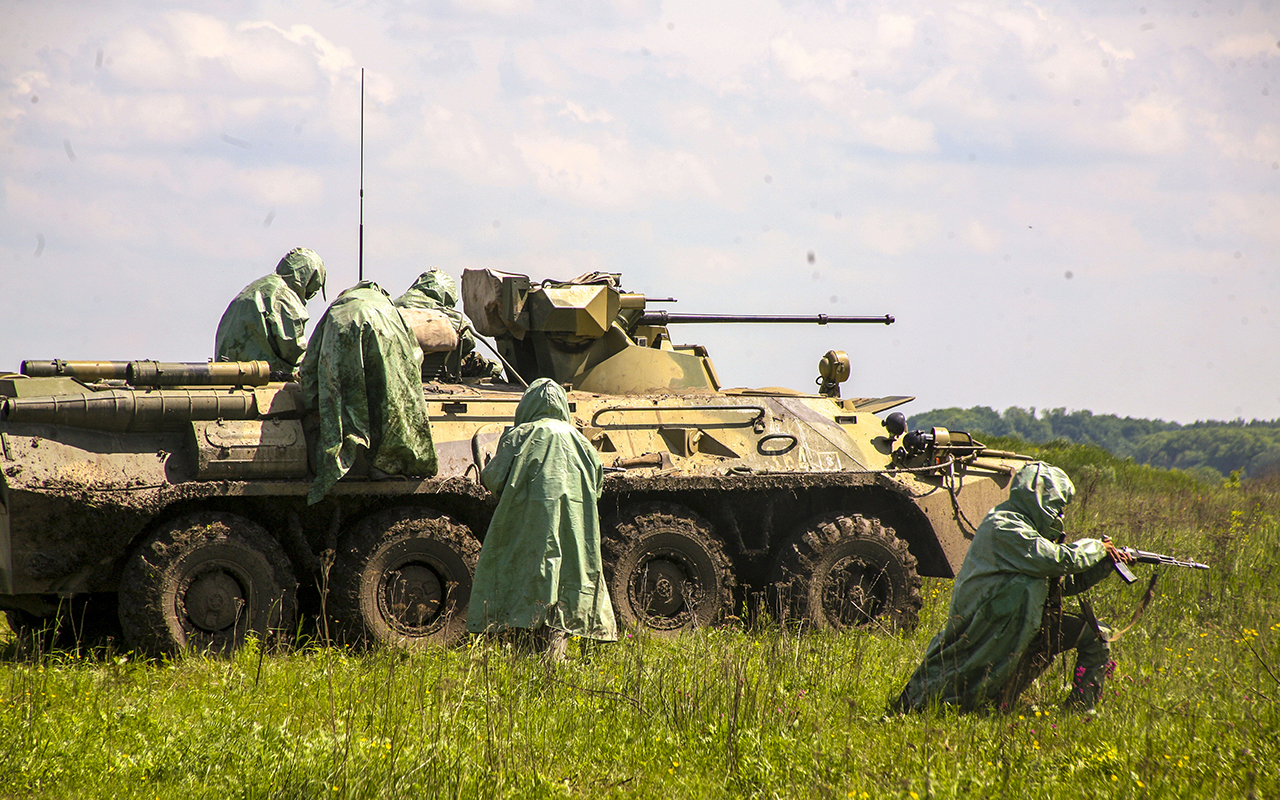
Armored personnel carrier BTR-82A with troops in NBC suits. NBC Protection Troops shock troops from the 27th Separate Brigade of NBC Protection, during training with the support of motorized rifle, tank and artillery units of the 20th Guards CAA, liberated the "captured" city in conditions of radiation contamination of the area.

The basis of the NBC Protection Troops are multifunctional separate NBCP brigades which have subunits capable to perform all NBC protection activities. The Russians know them as Radiological, Chemical and Biological (RKhB) troops. They often work within a combined arms army. Their main tasks include:

- identification and assessment of radiological, chemical and biological environment, scales and effects of damages of objects hazardous radiatively, chemically and biologically;
- protection of formations and units against the nuclear effects of mass destruction weapons and radiological, chemical and biological contamination;
- reducing the visibility of troops and facilities;
- disaster (damage) recovery in objects hazardous radiatively, chemically and biologically;
- causing loss to the enemy by using flame-incendiary means.

The NBC Protection Troops are organised for both conduct of hostilities using nuclear, biological and chemical weapons and without them and includes:

- nuclear detection;
- NBC reconnaissance and control;
- collection and processing of data and information on radiological, chemical and biological environment;
- notification of troops on NBC contamination;
- conducting special treatment (decontamination, degassing and disinfection) of armaments, military and special equipment, buildings and other objects, as well as sanitisation of personnel;
- aerosol counteraction against the enemy’s reconnaissance and targeting means.

The NBCP Troops are currently developing as dual-purpose forces, focusing on solving tasks both in war and peace times, in the aftermath of accidents and disasters in industrial facilities hazardous radiatively, chemically and biologically. Further build-up of their capacity is realized by creating a modern system to identify and assess the extent and effects of weapons of mass destruction, integrated with automated control systems of troops and weapons and stable functioning in the NBC threat environment and strong electronic countermeasures. In addition, there is a process to equip formations, units and subdivisions of NBCP with new, highly effective means of NBC reconnaissance, individual and collective defence, technical means of reducing the visibility and masking, flame-throwing incendiary weapons, as well as to introduce improved materials, formulations, methods and technical means of decontamination.

The 395th Independent Test Aviation Squadron which supports the NBCP Troops is based at Bagay-Baranovka in Saratov Oblast.

== Hardware ==
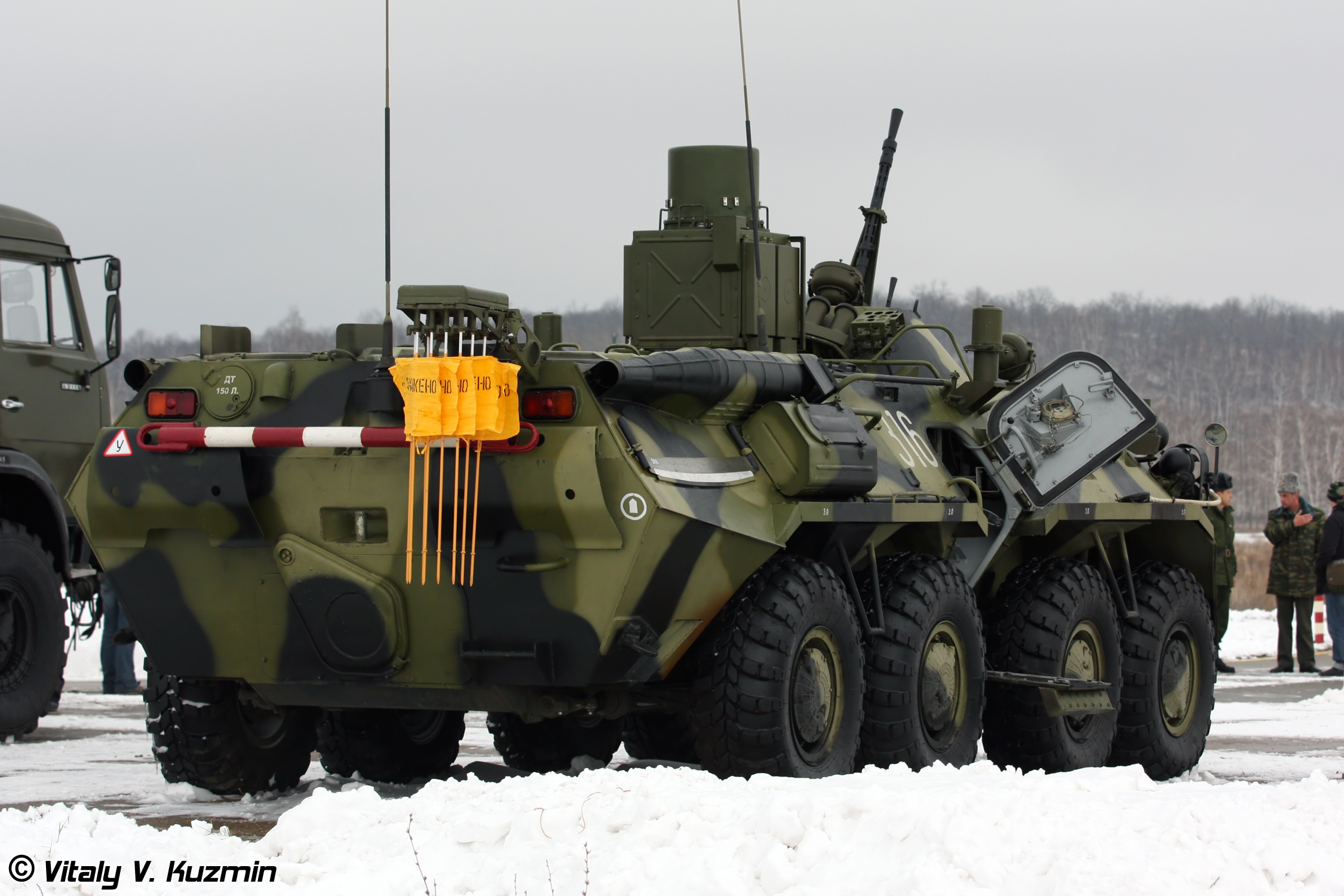
RPM-2 – radiological reconnaissance vehicle

What follows is a partial list as of November 2018 of military hardware available to the Russian NBCP troops:

- RPO-A Shmel infantry rocket flamethrower
- PMK-4 gas mask
- TOS-1 Buratino or TOS-1A Solntsepyok flamethrower
- TOS-2 Tosochka flamethrower
- TDA-3 smoke generator on a 3-axle 53501 Kamaz chassis, is designed to camouflage military facilities
- TMS-65 is a specialized chemical vehicle on Ural-375 undercarriage
- RKhM-6 is a chemical reconnaissance vehicle on a four-axle BTR-80 base
- RPM-2 is a radiological reconnaissance vehicle on a four-axle BTR-80 base
- UTM-80 heat engine, designed to clean other equipment after exposure to NCB threats

== Units ==
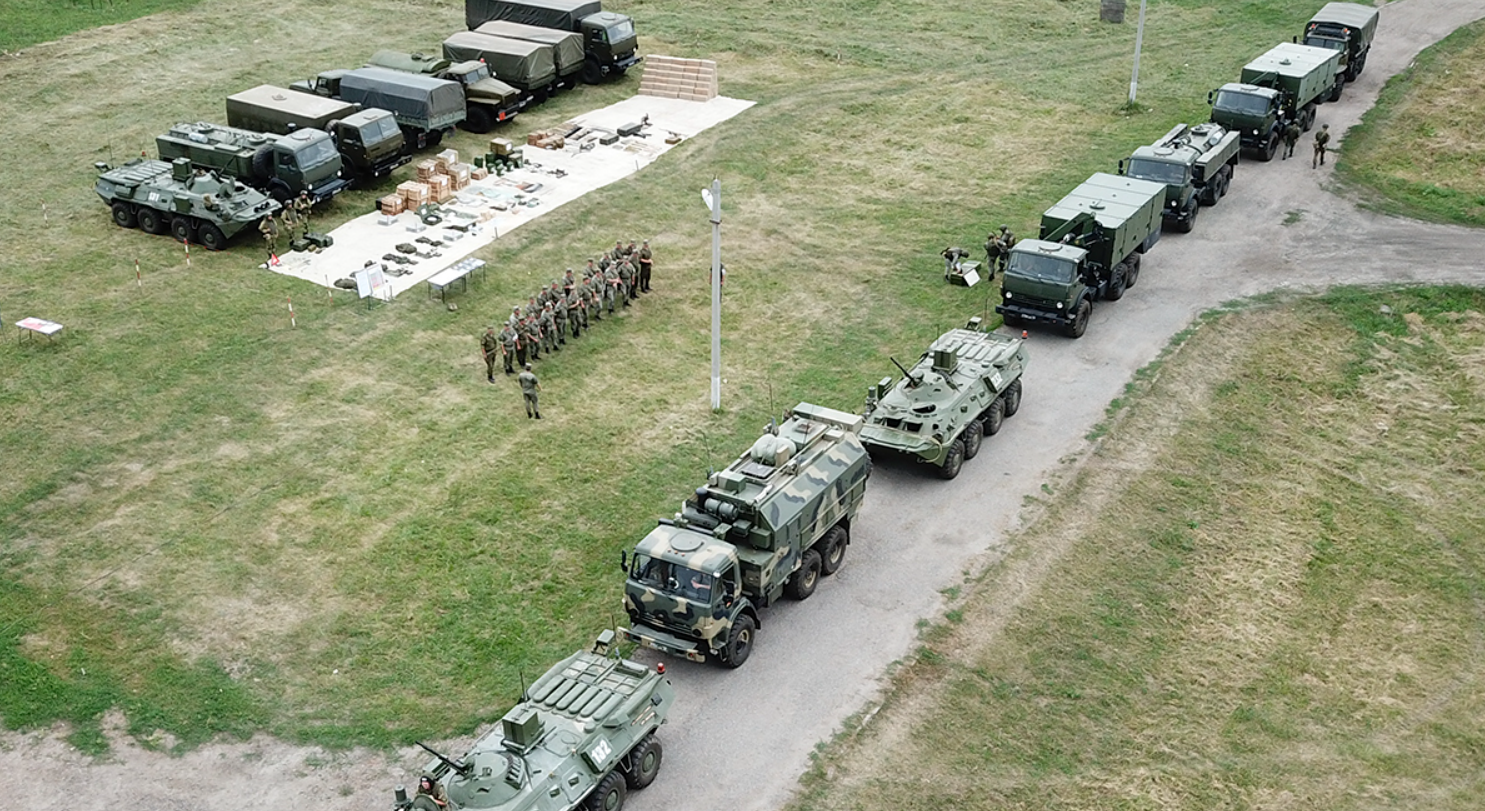
Troops of the RKhBZ of the Russian army, parked at exercises

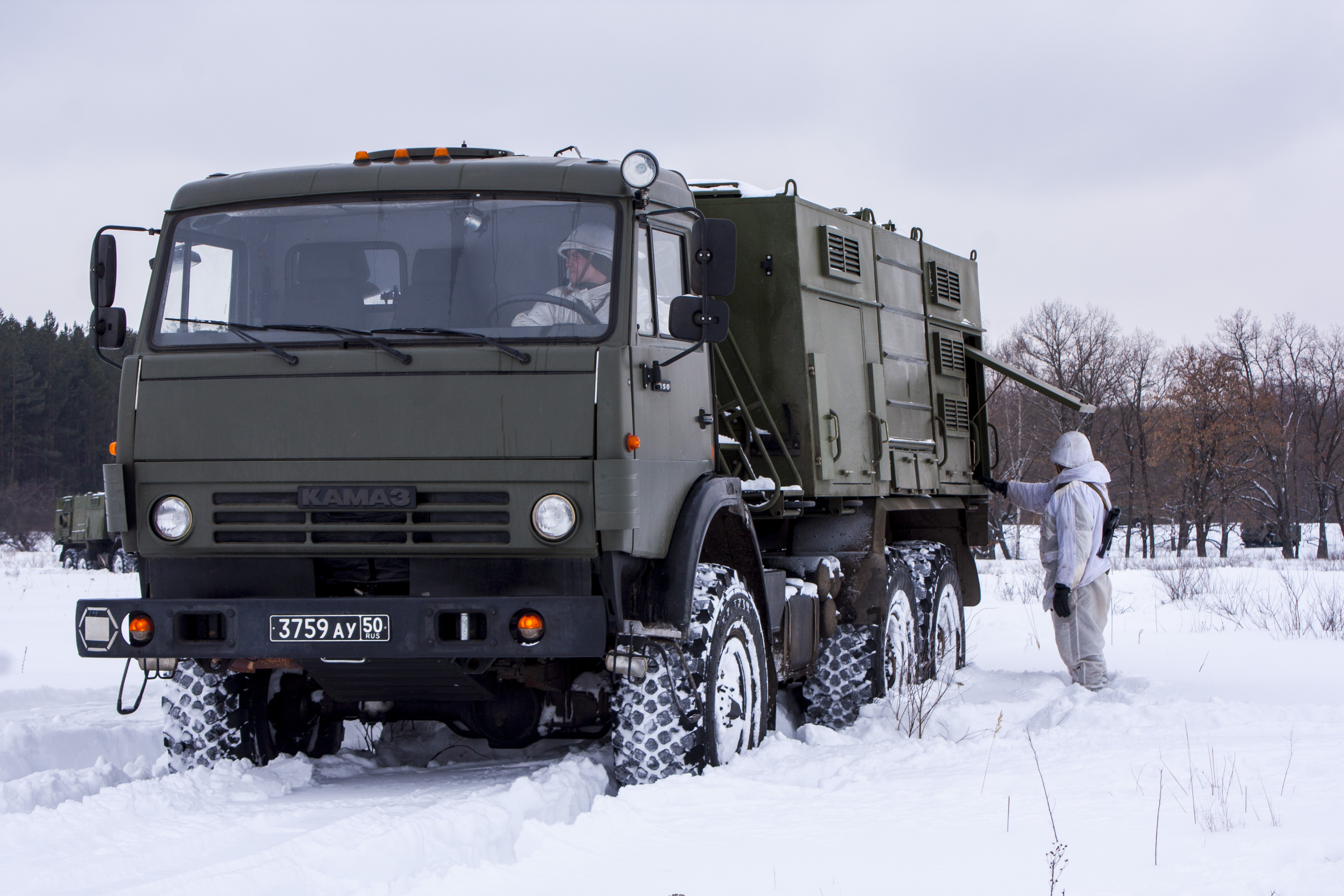
TDA-3 unit. An exercise in the Kursk region for the 27th separate brigade of the RKhBZ to eliminate the consequences of chemical contamination.

- 1st Guards Mobile NBC Protection Brigade (Shikhany-2, Oblast of Saratov) (MUN 71432, Central Military District)
- 16th NBC Protection Brigade (Lesozavodsk) (MUN 07059, Eastern Military District) (see ru:16-я отдельная гвардейская бригада радиационной, химической и биологической защиты)
- 27th NBC Protection Brigade (Kursk) (MUN 11262, Western Military District)
- 28th NBC Protection Brigade (Kamyshin, Volgograd Oblast) (MUN 65363, Southern Military District)
- 29th NBC Protection Brigade (Yekaterinburg) (MUN 34081, Central Military District)
- 2nd NBC Protection Regiment (Chapayevsk) (MUN 18664, 2nd GCAA)
- 4th NBC Protection Regiment (Sevastopol) (MUN 86862)
- 6th NBC Protection Regiment (Sapyornoye, Leningrad Oblast, Priozersky District) (MUN 12086, 6th CAA)
- 9th NBC Protection Regiment (Shikhany), (MUN 29753)
- 10th NBC Protection Regiment (Topchikha) (MUN 55121, 41st GCAA)
- 17th NBC Protection Regiment (Krasnodar Krai) (49th CAA)
- 19th NBC Protection Regiment (Gorny, Zabaykalsky Krai) (MUN 56313, 29th GCAA)
- 20th NBC Protection Regiment (Tsentralny, Volodarsky District) (MUN 12102, 1st GTA)
- 24th NBC Protection Regiment (20th GCAA)
- 25th Guards NBC Protection Regiment (Sergeyevka, Pogranichny District) (MUN 58079, 5th GCAA)
- 26th NBC Protection Regiment (Onokhoy) (MUN 62563, 36th CAA)
- 35th NBC Protection Regiment (Belogorsk, Amur Oblast) (MUN 59792, 35th CAA)
- 39th NBC Protection Regiment (Oktyabrsky, Kalachovsky District, Volgograd Oblast) (MUN 16390, 8th GCAA)
- 40th NBC Protection Regiment (Troitskaya, Ingushetia, Republic of Ingushetia) (MUN 16383, 58th GCAA)
- 70th Separate Flamethrower Battalion (Razdolnoye, Primorsky Krai) (MUN 41474)

== Videogallery ==
TOS-1A Solntsepyok combat firing; 20th NBC Protection Regiment

TOS-1A Solntsepyok combat firing; 6th NBC Protection Regiment

== See also ==
- ru:Центральный военно-химический склад № 136 (Central Military Chemical Warehouse No. 136,) Kambarka, Udmurtia
- ru:Химическое оружие России
- ru:Чапаевский завод по уничтожению химического оружия
- NBC Protection Military Academy
- Canadian Joint Incident Response Unit
- 2nd Dragoon Regiment (France)
- United States Army CBRN School
