= TOS-2 =

Russian multiple thermobaric rocket launcher

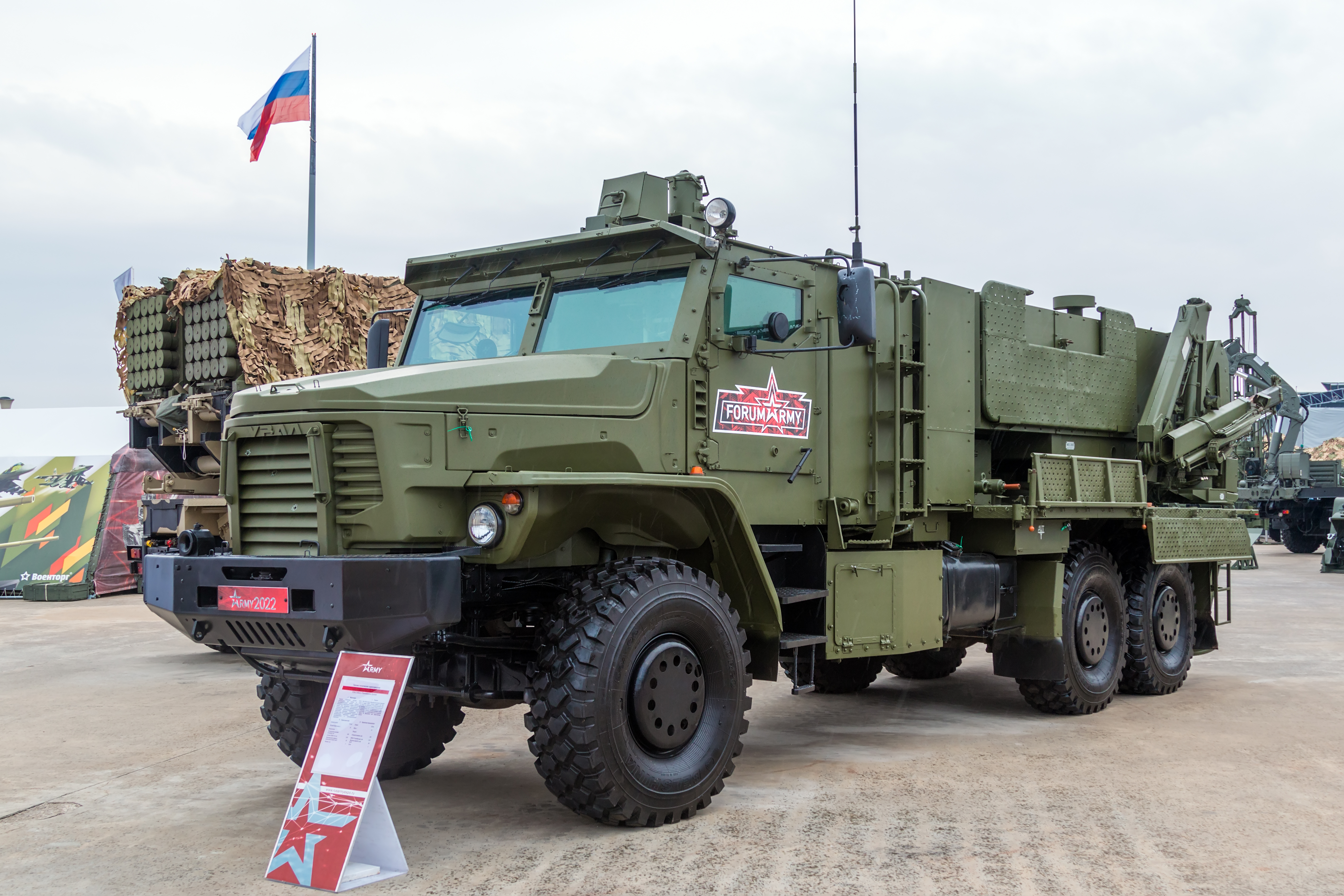
- TOS-2 during the "Armiya 2022" exhibition
- Type: Multiple rocket launcher
- Place of origin: Russia

Service history
- In service: 2021–present
- Used by: Russia
- Wars: Russo-Ukrainian war

Production history
- Designer: NPO Splav
- Designed: 2016
- Produced: 2021
- Variants: TOS-2

Specifications
- Shell: 18 MLRS
- Caliber: 220 mm (8.7 in)
- Effective firing range: 20 km

The TOS-2 (Tosochka) (Russian: тяжёлая огнемётная система [ТОС-2], romanized: Tyazhyelaya ognemyotnaya sistema [TOS-2], Heavy Flamethrower System) is a Russian multiple rocket launcher capable of using thermobaric warheads, mounted on a 3-axle truck chassis. TOS-2 was designed to attack enemy fortified positions and lightly armoured vehicles and transports, in open terrain in particular.

== History ==
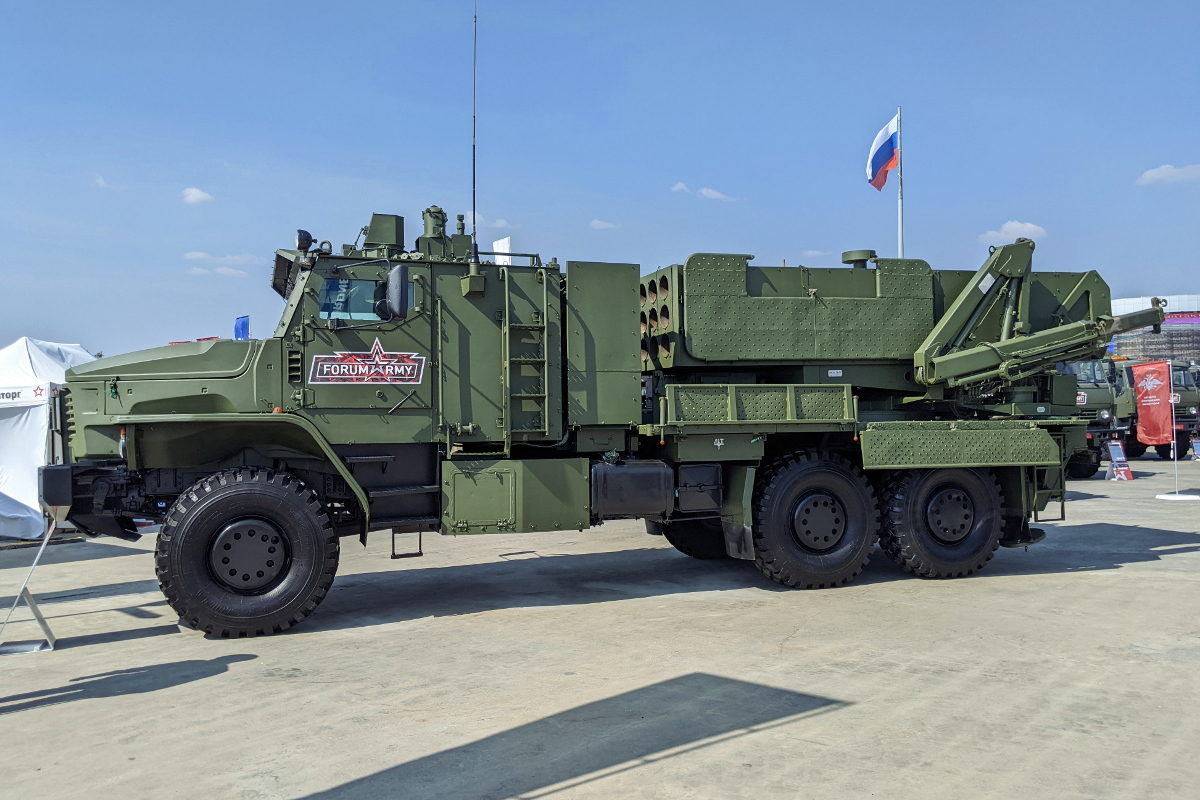
Full side view of the TOS-2

On 12 January 2018, it was announced that NPO Splav was working on a prototype of a next generation TOS-1 system for preliminary tests. The system with improved tactical and technical characteristics will be made on a wheeled chassis.

The new TOS-2 (Tosochka) system was first unveiled during the 2020 Moscow Victory Day Parade, and further showcased during the Kavkaz-2020 drills in September 2020. It is equipped with a more powerful TBS-M3 rocket and its own crane. It has also an increased range and is protected from precision weapons. The system uses the 6x6 Ural-63706-0120 all-terrain vehicle instead of the tracked armored chassis of the TOS-1A.

The TOS-2 entered service with the Central Military District on 6 January 2021.

In late May 2022, TASS reported that the system was deployed in Ukraine during the 2022 Russian invasion of Ukraine. In October 2023, the TOS-2 system was sighted in the area surrounding Kreminna, Luhansk Oblast. It was reported in August 2024 that the range of the system has been extended, up to 20 km. Supplies of a masking coating began in October 2024.

In February 2025, photos showing a destroyed TOS-2 MLRS in the Pokrovsk area were published on the internet. This represented the first confirmed loss of this system. As of 18 June 2025, OSINT defense analysis website Oryx lists one TOS-2 as destroyed and one as damaged.

== Munitions ==
- The MO.1.01.04 (Russian: неуправляемый реактивный снаряд) are 3.3 m (10 ft 10 in) long and weigh 173 kg (381 lb). The original rocket for the TOS-1A had a range of only 2,700 m (8,900 ft). Modernized systems with active protection, new engine and launchers and other improvements were delivered in early 2018.
- The MO.1.01.04M rocket is 3.7 m (12 ft 2 in) long and weighs 217 kg (478 lb). This version extends the range to 6,000 m (20,000 ft). The system was modernized in 2016.
- The M0.1.01.04M2 rocket was upgraded in March 2020 to a heavier thermobaric warhead and better 10km range, to operate outside the range of modern ATGMs.
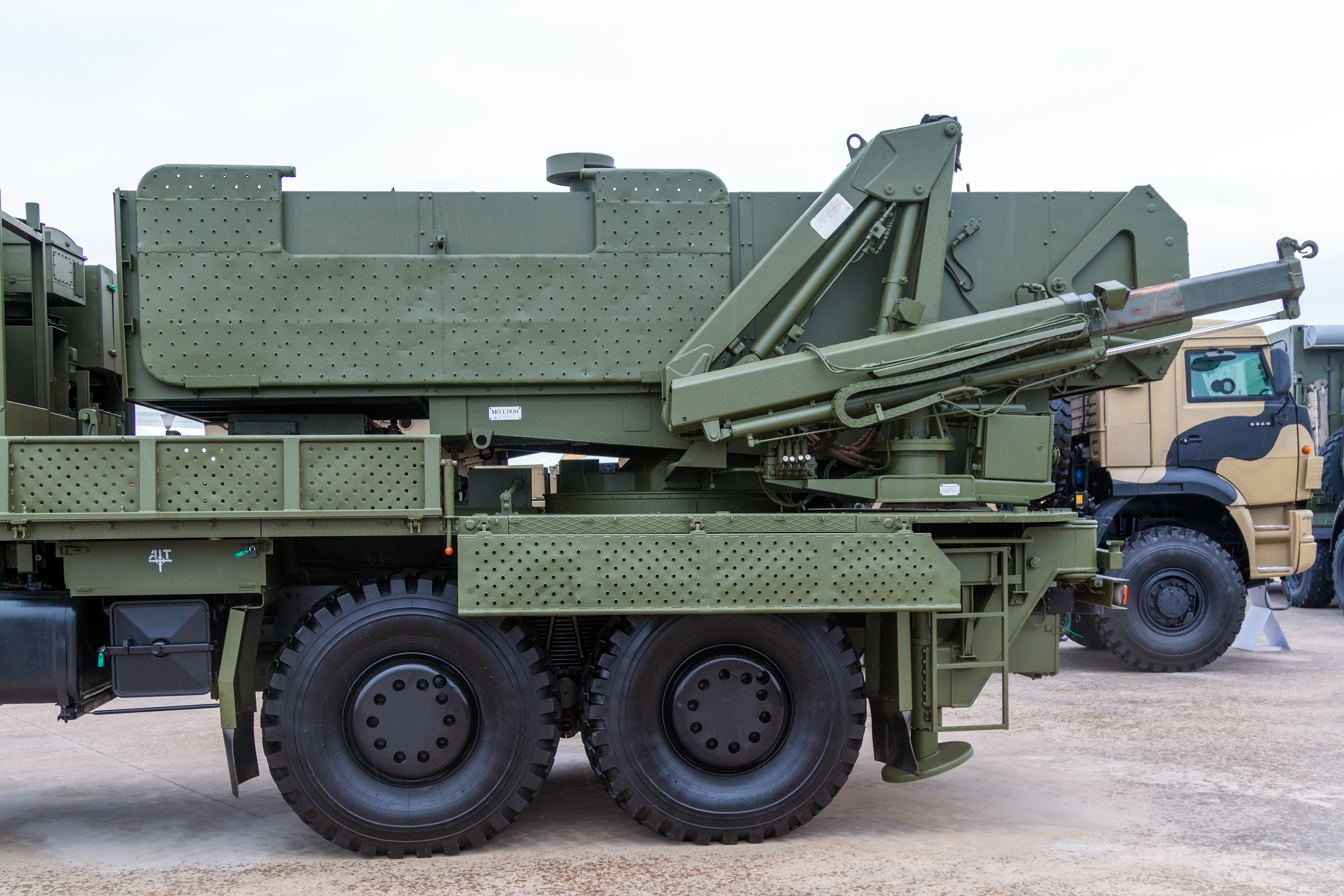
Side view of the TOS-2 with closeup of small 3-link crane attachment

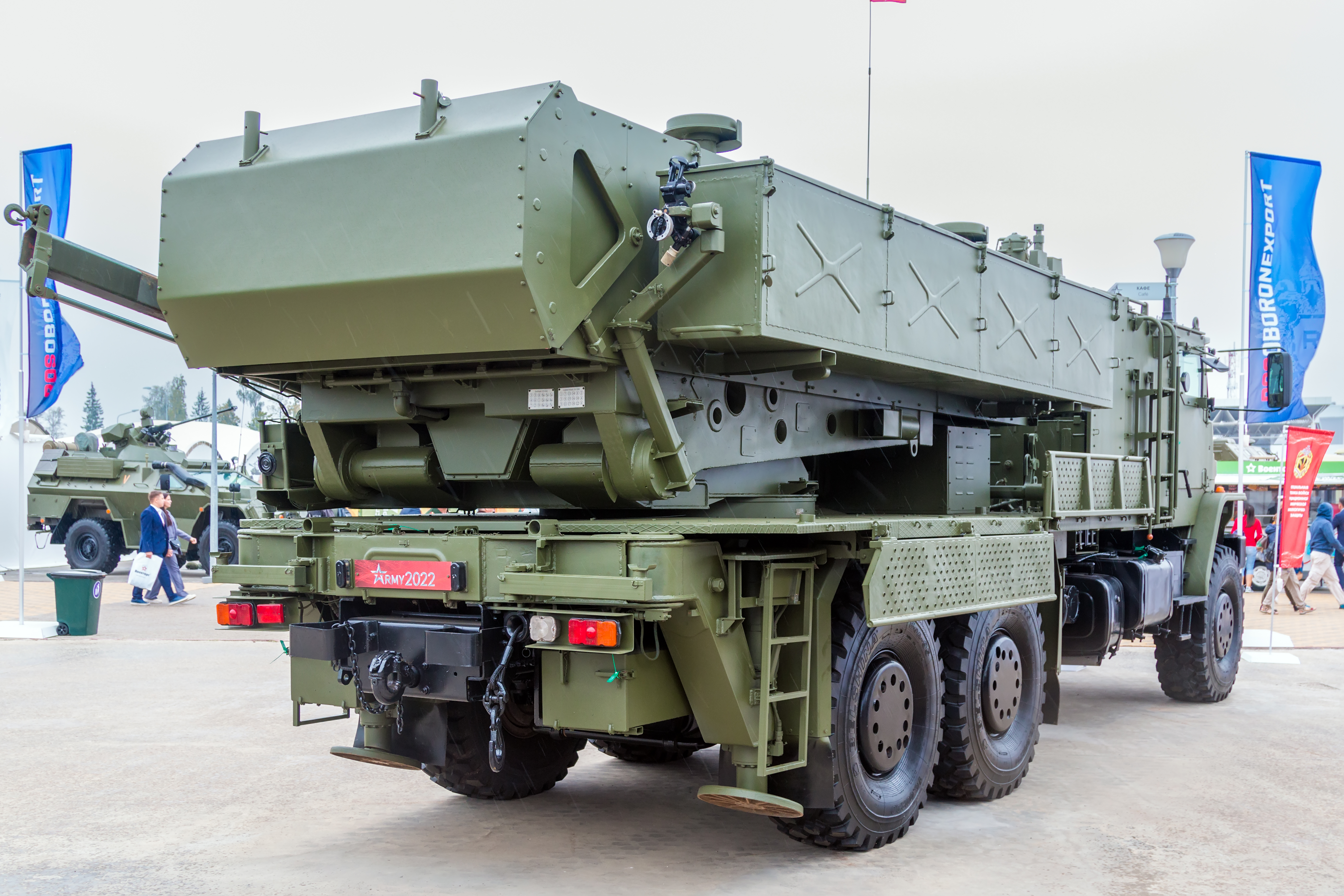
Rear view of the TOS-2

TOS-2 system operating near Avdiivka

== See also ==
- TOS-1 Buratino – a Soviet 30-barrel MLRS introduced in 1988 and mounted on a T-72 / T-90 tank chassis.
- TOS-1A Solntsepyok – an extended-range 24-barrel variant of TOS-1 introduced in 2003.
- TOS-3 Drakon – a 2024 prototype-stage larger-caliber 15-barrel MLRS with a tracked tank chassis and the TOS-2 launcher.
