= REM-KL =

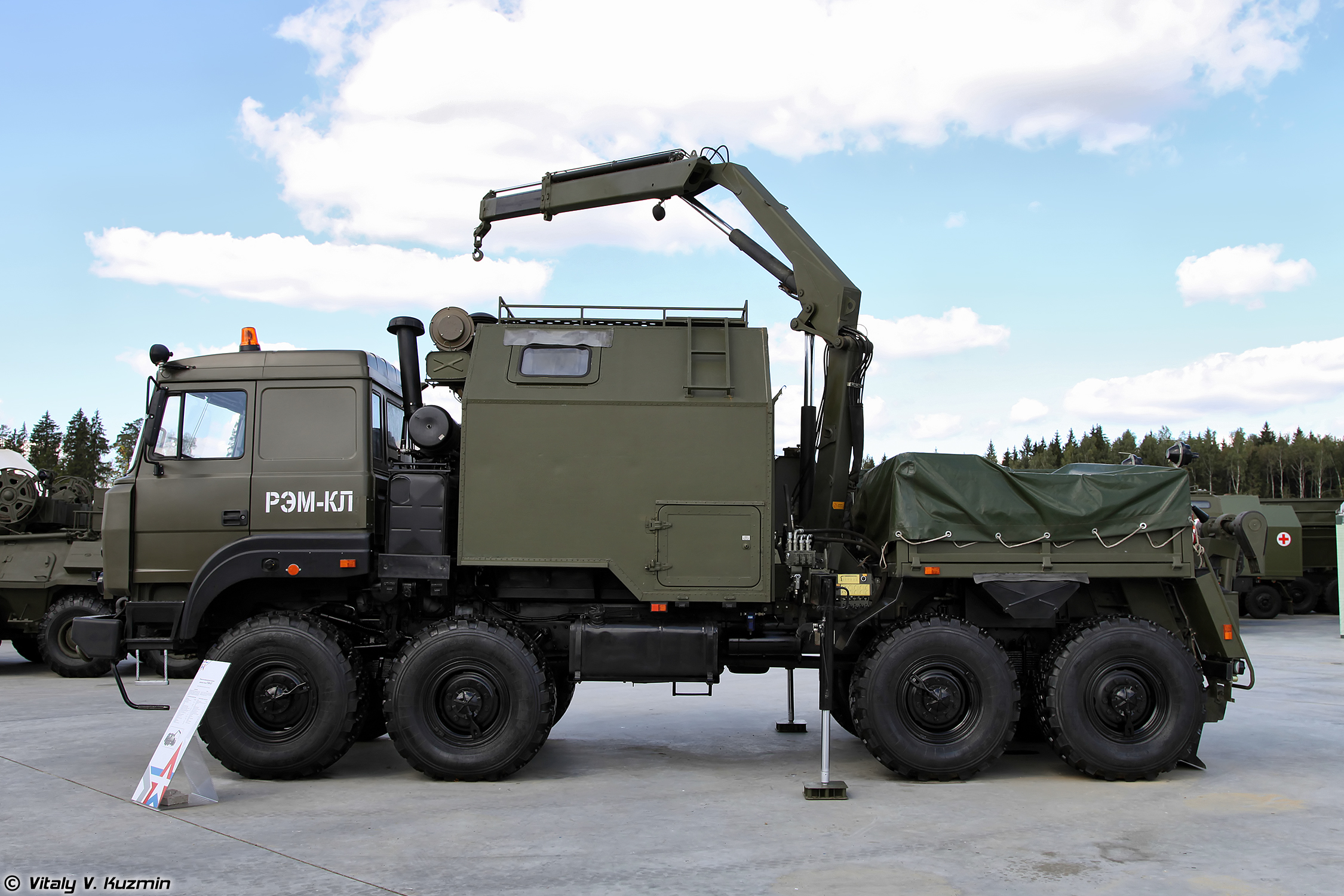
- A REM-KL with its crane deployed
- Type: Light-wheeled repair and recovery vehicle
- Place of origin: Russia

Service history
- Used by: Russia
- Wars: Russo-Ukrainian War

Production history
- Designed: Early 2000s
- Manufacturer: Ural Automotive Plant
- Developed from: Ural 5323
- Produced: Early 2010s-Present
- No. built: Limited number

Specifications
- Mass: 18.25 t
- Length: 9.2 m
- Width: 2.95 m
- Height: 3.56 m
- Crew: 3

The REM-KL is a Russian light-wheeled repair and recovery vehicle. It has been developed by the Ural Automotive Plant in Miass since the early 2010s.

== Description ==
The REM-KL is built off of the chassis of the Ural 5323-62, an all-terrain heavy-duty transport vehicle. It has a cab-over-engine layout, giving it a flat front. It has an 8x8 wheel arrangement, suited for usage in Siberia and the Far East. It is equipped with a workshop, an IM-95 crane manipulator, and a recovery winch. It also allows vehicles to be hitched and towed in a partly lifted position.

The REM-KL can transport semi-loaded vehicles at a maximum of 30 km/h on dirt roads, and 50 km/h on paved roads. Its crane has a total lifting capacity of 2.83 tons, with the REM-KL being able to transport up to 16 tons on dirt roads and 22 tons on paved roads. The REM-KL's winch cable has a total length of 60 meters. There is also an electric generator that allows the vehicle to be used for repair and welding work.

In a press statement, the Eastern Military District said that the main advantages the REM-KL had over its predecessors are its cross-country capabilities and more powerful equipment. This allows the vehicle to be used for the restoration or evacuation of damaged equipment in difficult warzone conditions.

== Service ==
The REM-KL has been used by the Russian Ground Forces since the early 2010s. It made its debut in the 2022 Russian invasion of Ukraine, a major escalation in the Russo-Ukrainian War. As of May 2024, a total of 11 have seen combat: 9 of them were destroyed, 1 damaged, and another captured.
