= Final protective fire =

Military tactical plan

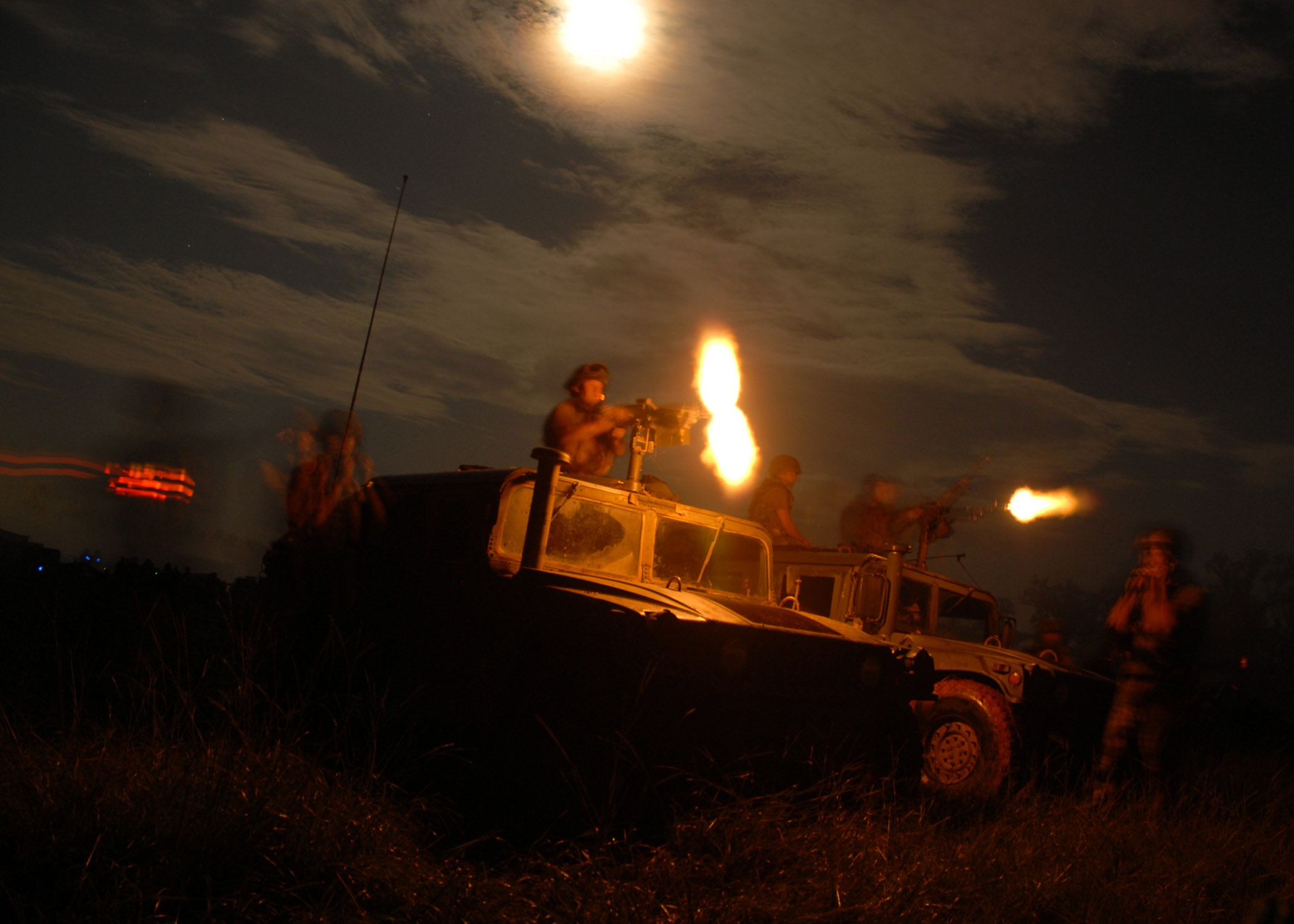
Two gunners from Naval Mobile Construction Battalion (NMCB) 1 convoy security teams fire the rest of their rounds following the final protective fire scenario of the Battalion's field exercise at Camp Shelby. (June 27, 2007).

Final protective fire is an immediately available barrier of direct and indirect fire designed to provide close protection to friendly positions and installations. It involves the concentration of weapons fire directly in front of the unit to impede enemy movement. An FPF request has absolute priority over any other kind of request.

The size of the FPF depends on the number and type of weapons firing (e.g., FPF size for one battery of 155 mm howitzers is 300 m × 50 m, 105mm howitzers is 210x35, 120mm Mortars is 300x75, 81mm Mortars is 150x50, and 60mm Mortars is 60x30 meters). The supported maneuver commander designates the location of the FPF and it is adjusted into place by the Joint Forward Observer (JFO). Normally, the FPF is initiated 400 to 600 meters away from friendly units, and adjusted to within 200 to 400 meters of friendly positions (known as "danger close") and is integrated into the final protective line of the maneuver unit.

As the "final" in the name implies, it is the last resort in defensive plans, involving artillery integrated with small arms and heavy machine gun fire directed dangerously close to friendly defensive positions that are at risk of being overrun by the enemy.

Final protective fire is also commonly incorporated into a defensive plan that incorporates a final protective line, which is a line that, once the enemy has crossed, prompts the FPF plan to be enacted.

Reference: ATP 3-09.30
