= Guards Badge (Russia) =

Guards badge
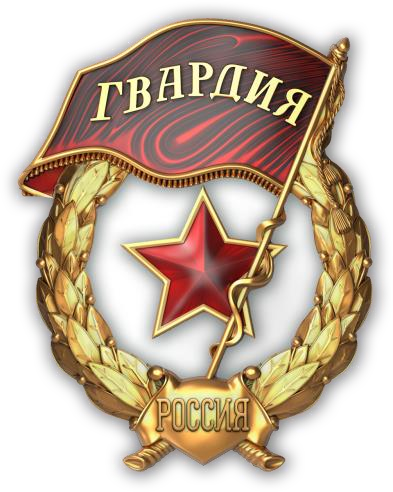
- Type: State Decoration
- Presented by: Russian Federation
- Eligibility: Russian citizens
- Status: Active

Precedence
- Next (higher): Badge of Honorary title of the Russian Armed Forces
- Next (lower): Academic badge

The Guards Badge (Russian: Знак «Гвардия») is a chest badge that is a mark of distinction for military personnel awarded the Guards military rank and serving in the Guards military formations of the Russian Federation.

== Overview ==
Since 2012, the image of the Guard Badge is not placed on the battle flags of the Guards military formations of Russia, unlike the flags of some Guards formations of the USSR (in particular, the flags of the Guards armies and corps). The distinctive signs of the battle flags of the Guards formations of the Russian Federation are the St. George banner ribbons and the top, together with which the battle flag of the Guards military formation is called the "St. George Banner"

The distinctive sign of the naval (stern) flags of the Guards, as well as Guards order-bearing formations and ships of the Russian Navy, according to the tradition inherited from the Navy of the USSR, is the image of the Guards ribbon, placed on their panels, according to which these flags are called "Guards Naval Flag" and "Guards Order Naval Flag" respectively.

In the federal period (currently and previously), Guards military formations exist (existed) only as part of the state military organization subordinated to the Ministry of Defense, that is, as part of the Russian Armed Forces. Among the military formations and law enforcement agencies consisting outside the norms of the number of the AF RF and subordinated to other federal executive bodies, Guards formations are absent. At the same time, the possibility of assigning guards titles to these formations and bodies, as well as to military formations of the Russian Armed Forces, is provided for in recognition of the mass heroism and bravery, steadfastness and courage demonstrated by their personnel in combat operations to defend the Fatherland and state interests in armed conflicts.

== History ==
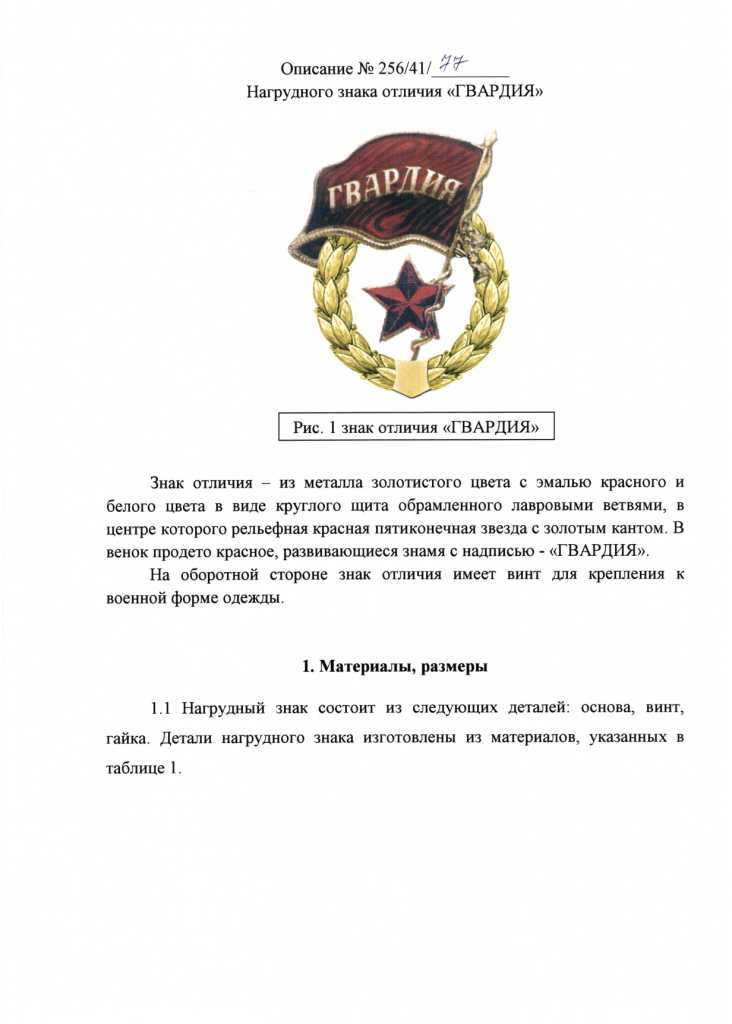
Badge design used from 2011 to 2024

After the collapse of the Soviet Union in December 1991 and the formation of the CIS Joint Armed Forces in February 1992, and then the Russian Armed Forces on May 7, 1992, the factories that manufactured the Soviet Guards badge, established on May 21, 1942, continued to produce the latter for a long time, and this type of badge (taking into account the significant stock available in army warehouses) in the 1990s continued to be issued to guardsmen serving in the Guards military formations of the newly formed Russian Federation. At the same time, in connection with the collapse of the Soviet system and the parade of sovereignties in full swing, the manufacturers of elements of the USSR award system faced the question of the advisability of producing "Guard" badges with Soviet symbols. Since no other options were proposed by the legislative and executive authorities of the new Russia at that time, many manufacturing plants began to produce their own "Guard" badges based on the design of the Soviet badge. These types of badges were never officially approved, so they were not official symbols, and were a kind of souvenir product, currently of interest to phalerist collectors.

As a result of the above-mentioned developments, several versions of the "Guard" badge appeared in 1992, one of which was a copy of the Soviet Guard badge, with the only difference being that on the ribbon-plate tying the laurel wreath, the abbreviation "USSR" was replaced with "CIS" - the Commonwealth of Independent States.

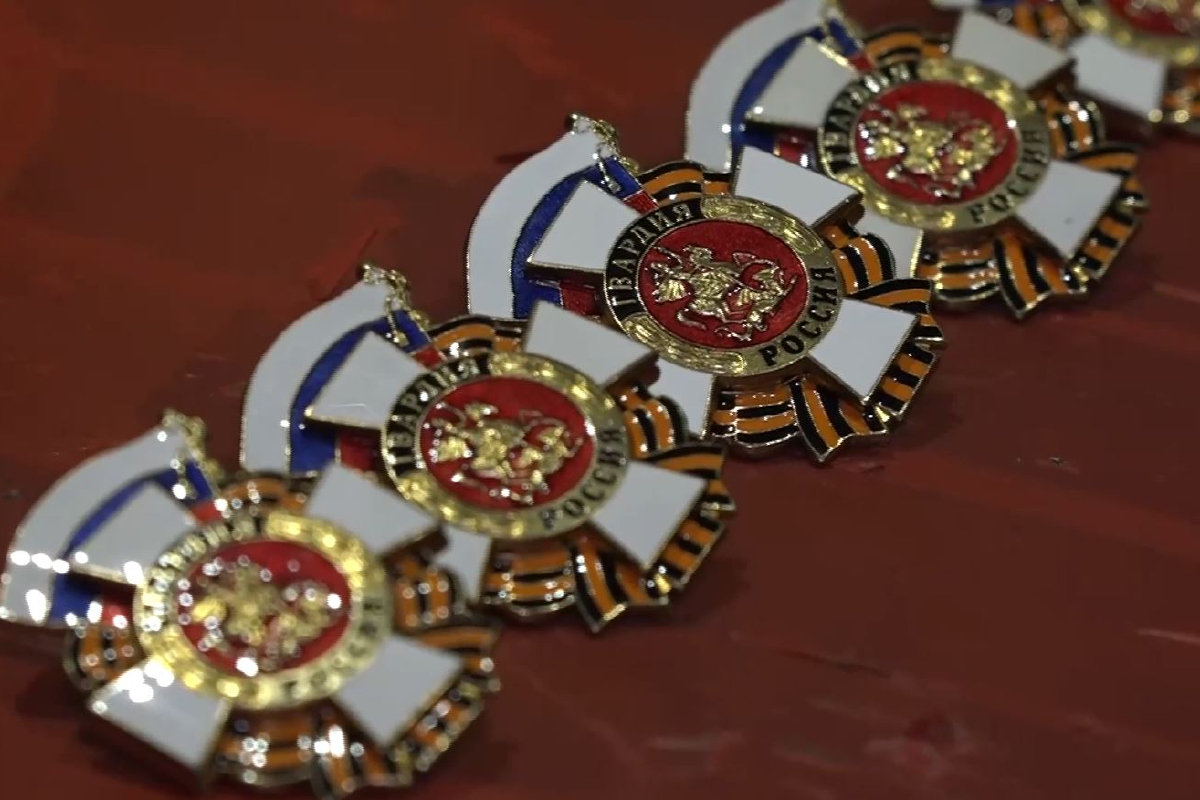
A variant of the Guards Badge

Other variants were a more thorough revision of the Soviet sign, where the red banner was replaced by the Russian tricolor, on the azure stripe of which the word "Guard" was placed. On the nameplate, instead of the abbreviation "USSR", the inscription "Russia" appeared, instead of the red star, a double-headed eagle was placed. Moreover, this type of sign was issued in 2 versions: with a republican (uncrowned) double-headed eagle - the emblem of the Russian Republic (which became the emblem of the Bank of Russia after the collapse of the USSR), and with a sovereign double-headed eagle - the Coat of Arms of Russia.

These types of signs were issued in fairly large series and were widely distributed, including among military personnel who bought these signs on their own initiative in various retail outlets specializing in the sale of military accessories. Some versions can still be found in military store chains.

=== Official symbols ===
On February 11, 1993, for military personnel of the Russian Federation, paragraph 2 of Article 45 of the first Russian law "On military duty and military service. legalized guards military ranks, subsequently - on March 28, 1998, approved by paragraph 2 of Article 46 of the following Federal Law No. 53-FZ "On military duty and military service".

On May 23, 1994, by Decree of the President of the Russian Federation No. 1010, new military uniforms and insignia for military ranks were approved. On July 28, 1994, this Decree was announced by order of the Minister of Defense of the Russian Federation No. 255. Clause 156 of the “Rules for wearing military uniforms by servicemen of the Armed Forces of the Russian Federation” introduced by order No. 255 prescribes the mandatory wearing of the “Guard” badge by all servicemen holding guards military ranks.

== See also ==
- Guards unit (Soviet Union)
