= TOS-1 =

Russian multiple thermobaric rocket launcher

ТОС-1 TOS-1 Buratino/TOS-1A Solntsepyok Object 634/634B/MO.1.01.00
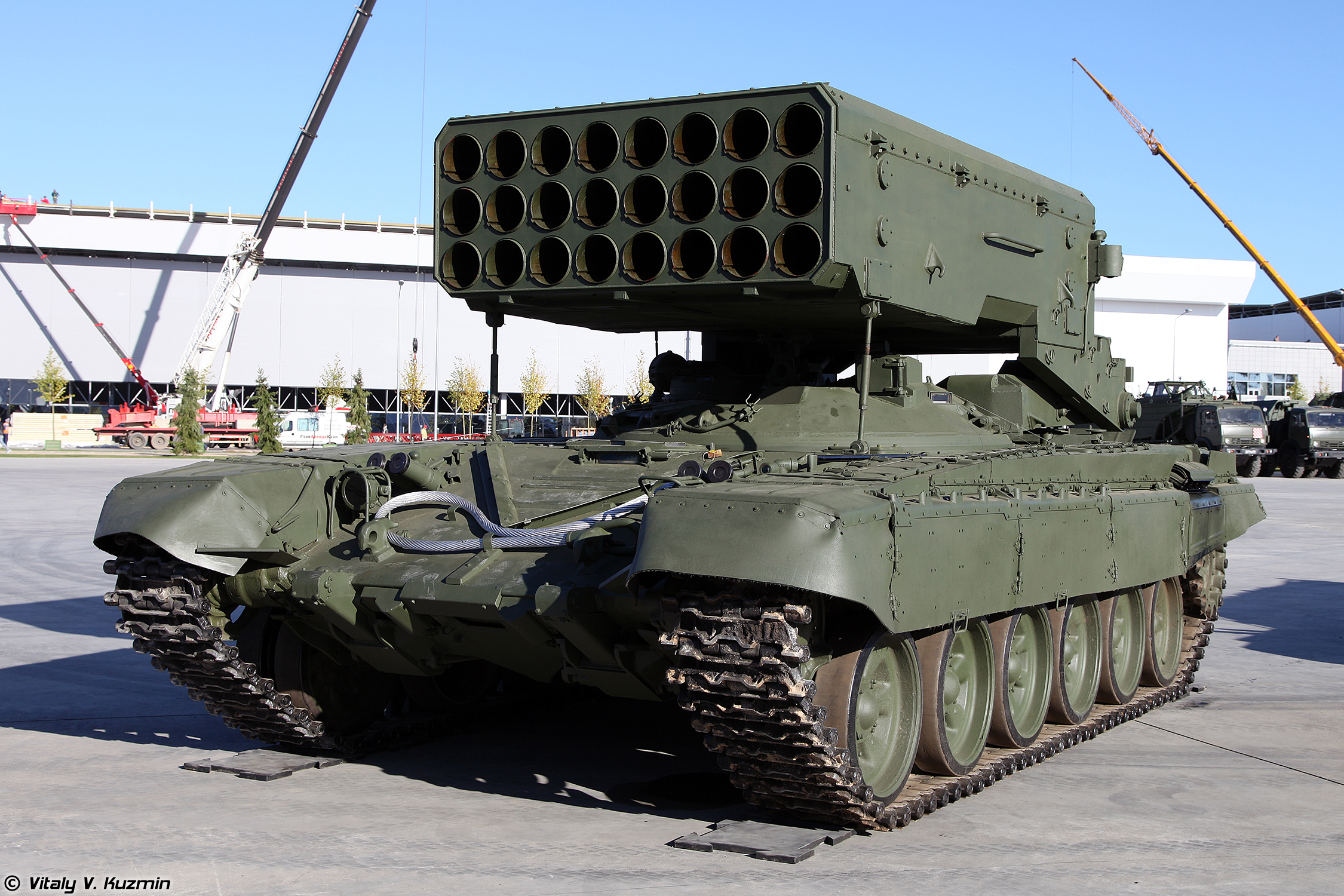
- BM-1 combat vehicle of the TOS-1A system
- Type: Multiple rocket launcher
- Place of origin: Soviet Union

Service history
- In service: 1988–present
- Used by: Soviet Union (historically), Russia, Azerbaijan, Armenia, Algeria, Syria, Iraq, Ukraine (captured from Russia)
- Wars: Soviet–Afghan War; Nagorno-Karabakh conflict Second Chechen War; War in Iraq (2013–2017); Syrian Civil War; War in Donbas; Second Nagorno-Karabakh War; Russo-Ukrainian war

Production history
- Designer: Omsk Transmash Design Bureau
- Designed: 1988
- Manufacturer: Uralvagonzavod
- Produced: TOS-1: 1987–present TOS-1A: 2003–present
- Variants: TOS-1A

Specifications
- Mass: 45.3 t (100,000 lb)
- Length: 9.5 m (31 ft 2 in)
- Width: 3.6 m (11 ft 10 in)
- Height: 2.22 m (7 ft 3 in)
- Crew: 3
- Caliber: 220 mm (8.7 in)
- Rate of fire: 30 rounds/15 s
- Effective firing range: .5-3 km (TOS-1); 10 km (TOS-1A)
- Engine: V-84 diesel 840 hp (630 kW)
- Operational range: 550 km (340 mi)
- Maximum speed: 60 km/h (37 mph)

TOS-1 Buratino (Russian: тяжёлая огнемётная система (ТОС-1), romanized: Tyazhyelaya ognemyetnaya sistema (TOS-1), Heavy Flamethrower System (TOS-1)) is a Soviet 220 mm 30-barrel (original system, Object 634 or TOS-1M) or 24-barrel (Object 634B or TOS-1A Solntsepyok) multiple rocket launcher capable of using thermobaric warheads, mounted on a T-72 / T-90 tank chassis. TOS-1 was designed to attack enemy fortified positions and lightly armored vehicles and transports, particularly in open terrain. The system’s first combat tests took place in 1988 and 1989 in the Panjshir Valley during the Soviet–Afghan War. The TOS-1 was shown for the first time in public in 1999 in Omsk.

TOS-1 is not assigned to the artillery units of the Russian Armed Forces but is found in Russian NBC Protection Troops.

== Development ==
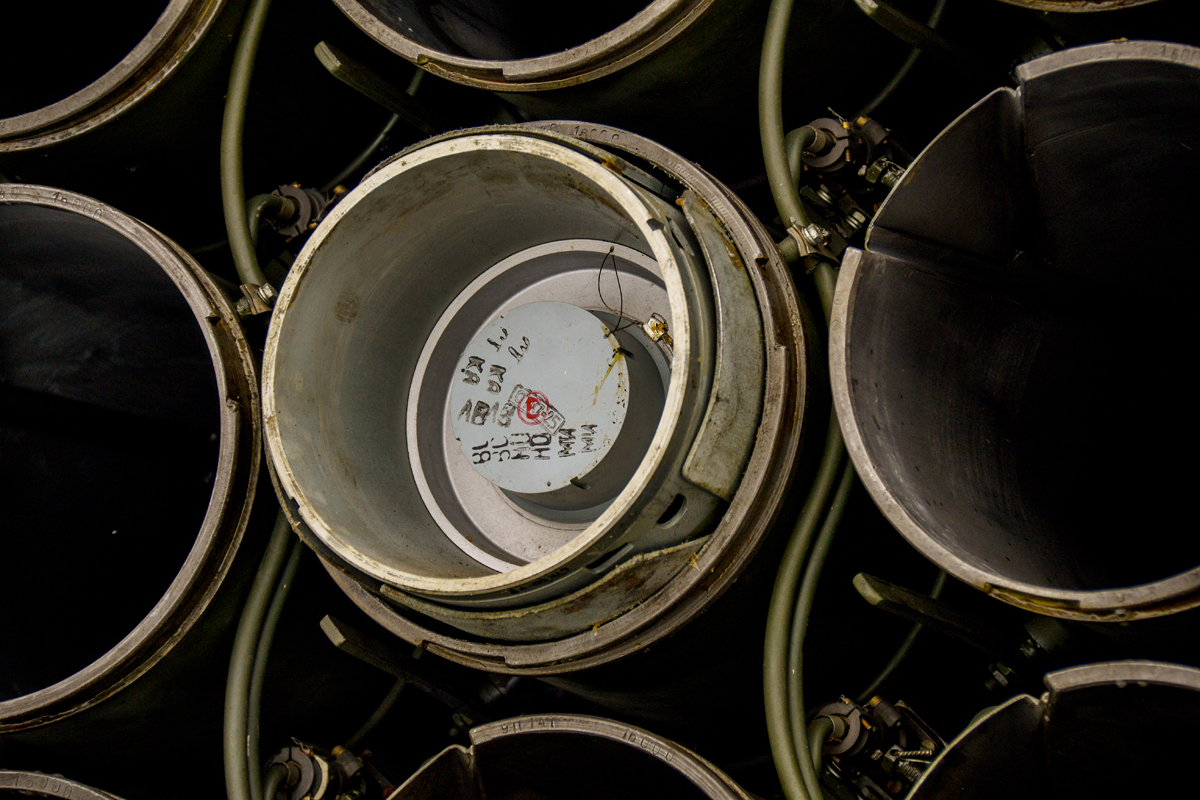
Loaded tube.

The idea of a heavy short-range MLRS to launch rockets equipped with incendiary and thermobaric warheads arose in the late 1970s. The combat system consisting of the combat vehicle, rockets, and loading vehicle was developed in early 1980s at KBTM in Omsk and was named TOS-1, remaining a secret development for a long time.

The TOS-1 Buratino is intended to engage military personnel, equipment, and buildings, including fortified constructions. The nickname "Buratino" originates with the name of the hero of a Russian retelling of the Pinocchio tale (by Alexey Tolstoy), given the perception of the big "nose" of the launcher (in the original Italian text of Pinocchio, the protagonist is a "burattino", the Italian word for "puppet"). The combat vehicle acts within the combat order of infantry and tanks. The large mass of the launcher, combined with the short range of rockets launches (3,500 metres, 3,800 yards), forced an increase in the level of armor and use the chassis of the T-72 main battle tank. The TZM reloading vehicle was built on the chassis of a KrAZ-255B cross-country truck and equipped with a crane for loading/unloading of the launcher. Production of KrAZ-255B has officially stopped in 1994. Therefore, TZM-T for later Soltsepyok was created based on the chassis of a T-72 variation T-72A.

In 2003, the improved TOS-1A Solntsepyok ("Scorching sunlight") system entered service with the range extended to 6 kilometres (6,600 yd) and a better ballistic computer.

In March 2020, Russia introduced a new rocket for the TOS-1A with a range of 10 kilometres (11,000 yd), achieved in part by weight and size reductions of a new fuel air explosive mixture in the warhead, while also increasing its power. Minimum range is extended from 400 to 1,600 metres (440 to 1,750 yd), so the shorter-range M0.1.01.04M rocket will be retained for close combat environments. In 2018, Russian NBC Protection Troops received 30 TOS-1A Solntsepyok (Sunburn) 220 mm multiple rocket launchers.

In October 2017 Saudi Arabian Military Industries signed a Memorandum of Understanding with Rosoboronexport for the local production of the TOS-1A.

== Operational history ==
=== Early uses ===
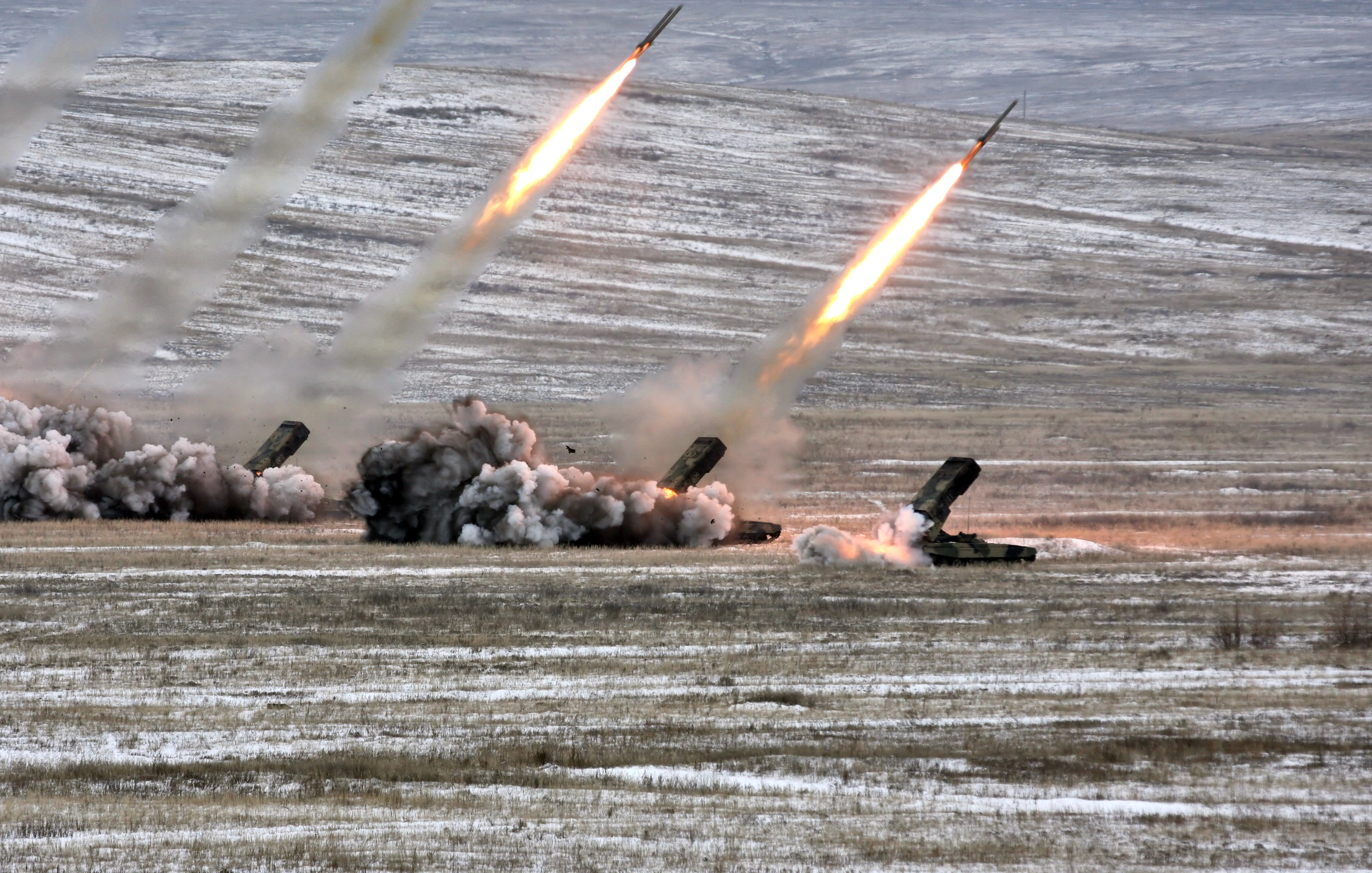
TOS-1A firing

The Soviets used TOS-1 in 1989 during the Soviet withdrawal from Afghanistan. Russia used them during the Second Chechen War, where they performed well in urban and mountainous terrain.

TOS-1As were first used in combat in Iraq by the Iraqi Army in the recapture of Jurf Al Sakhar on 24 October 2014, from ISIL forces. The Iraqi Army launched at least three TOS-1 rockets on 18 June 2017 during the first day of an offensive to recapture the Old City of Mosul, Iraq, from the Islamic State, targeting school buildings held by Islamic State forces and known to be devoid of civilians.

The OSCE reported in September 2015 that the TOS-1 was sighted in a rebel training area in eastern Ukraine.

The TOS-1 was used in Syria on 10 October 2015, by Syrian Army forces against rebel forces in Hama. In 2016, it was used against rebel forces in the Latakia mountains, with at least one being destroyed by a rebel Kornet ATGM near Northern Aleppo. It was used again by the Syrian Arab Army in April 2017 in the area of Palmyra, and later in the same month to destroy an ISIS camp. In November 2018, the system was deployed by the SAA against ISIS in Al-Safa region.

Azerbaijan used the TOS-1A against the Nagorno-Karabakh Defense Army on 4 April 2016 and 28 September 2020.

It took part in the large-scale Russian-Belarusian exercise Zapad in September 2021.

=== Russo-Ukrainian war ===
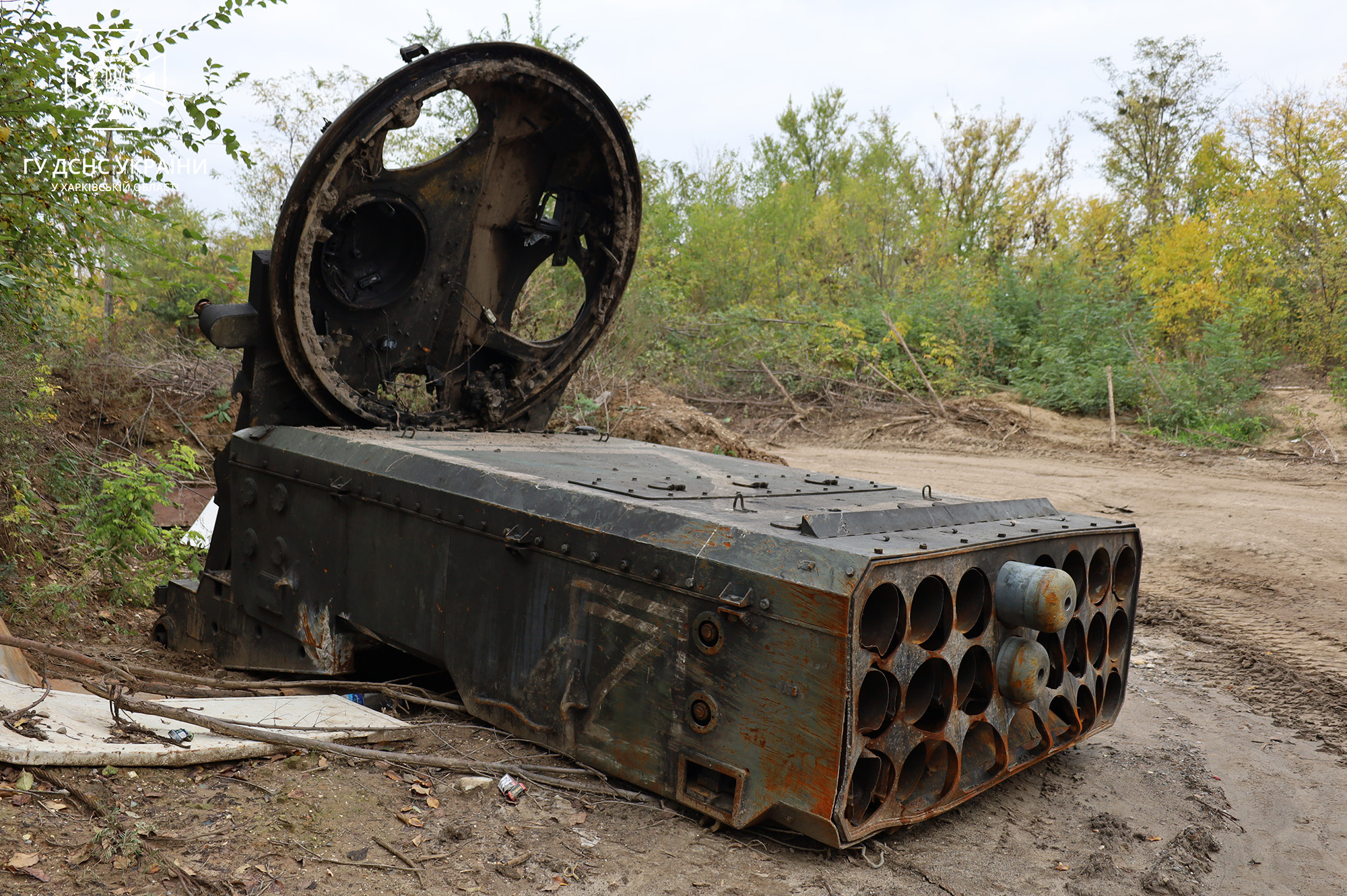
A destroyed TOS-1 after the 2022 Kharkiv counteroffensive.

Russia deployed the TOS-1A from the start of the war. One tactic for breaching fortified positions was to have a BM-1 launcher fire a 8-16 rocket salvo from the Line of Contact. Other effective uses included close-range final protective fires and disrupting Ukrainian attacks by striking assembly areas. The TOS-1A was a "prime target" for Ukraine. The BM-1 launchers were frequently used individually rather than in groups to avoid detection and to operate closer to the front line.

== Components ==
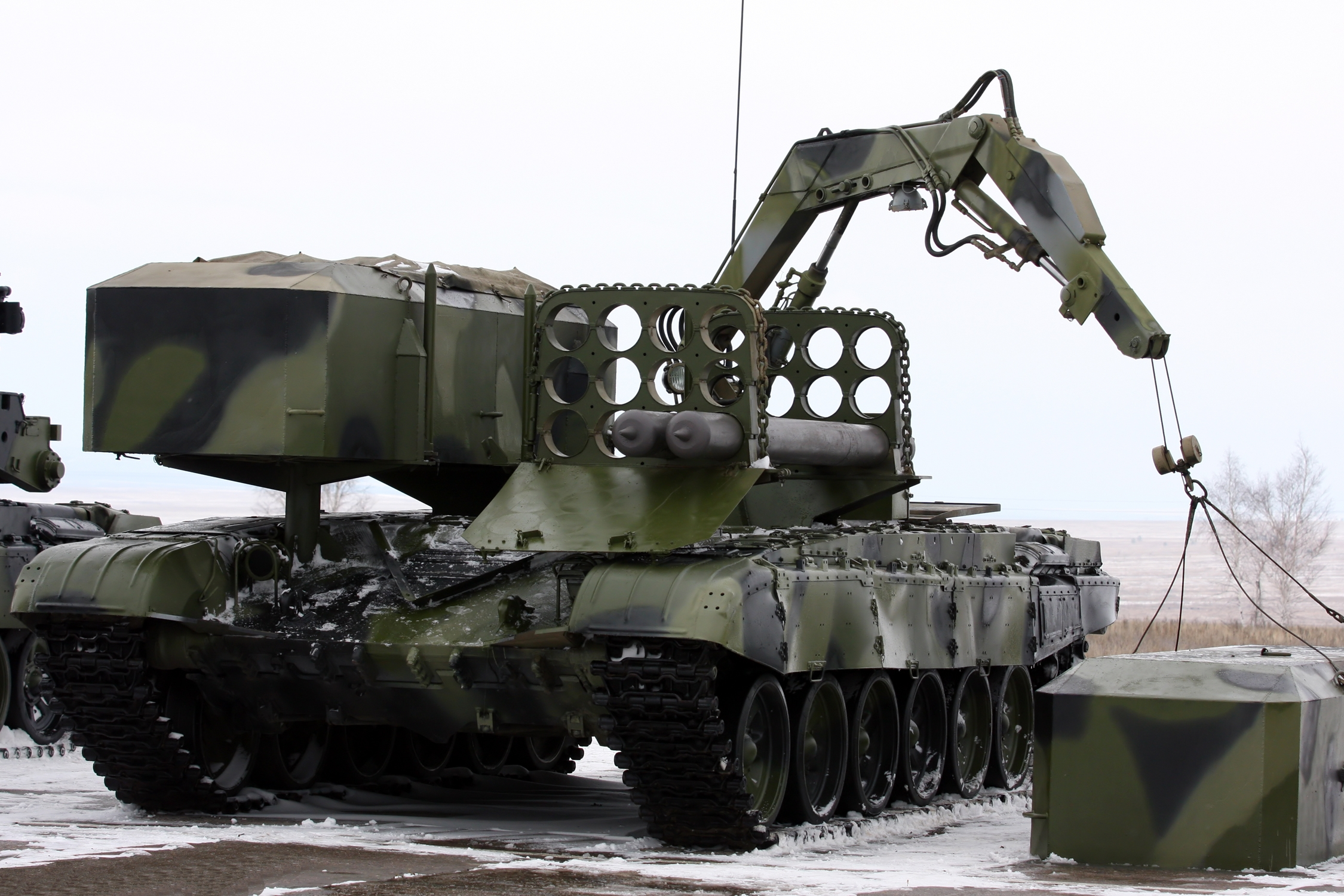
A TZM-T loader-transport vehicle with an uncovered rocket storage rack.

The TOS-1A system uses the following components:

BM-1
Multiple rocket launcher based on the T-72 tank chassis. Units delivered in 2018 had improvements including reactive armour, new engines and launchers. A new topographic orientation system is being reportedly installed as of October 2023.
TZM-T
Ammunition transport and loader based on the T-72 tank chassis.
MO.1.01.04
Rocket with thermobaric warhead.
MO.1.01.04M
Improved MO.1.01.04 with heavier warhead and a longer range of 6,000 m (20,000 ft). Detonation produces a peak temperature of 3,700 °C (6,690 °F), and high heat persists after the blast.

== Operators ==
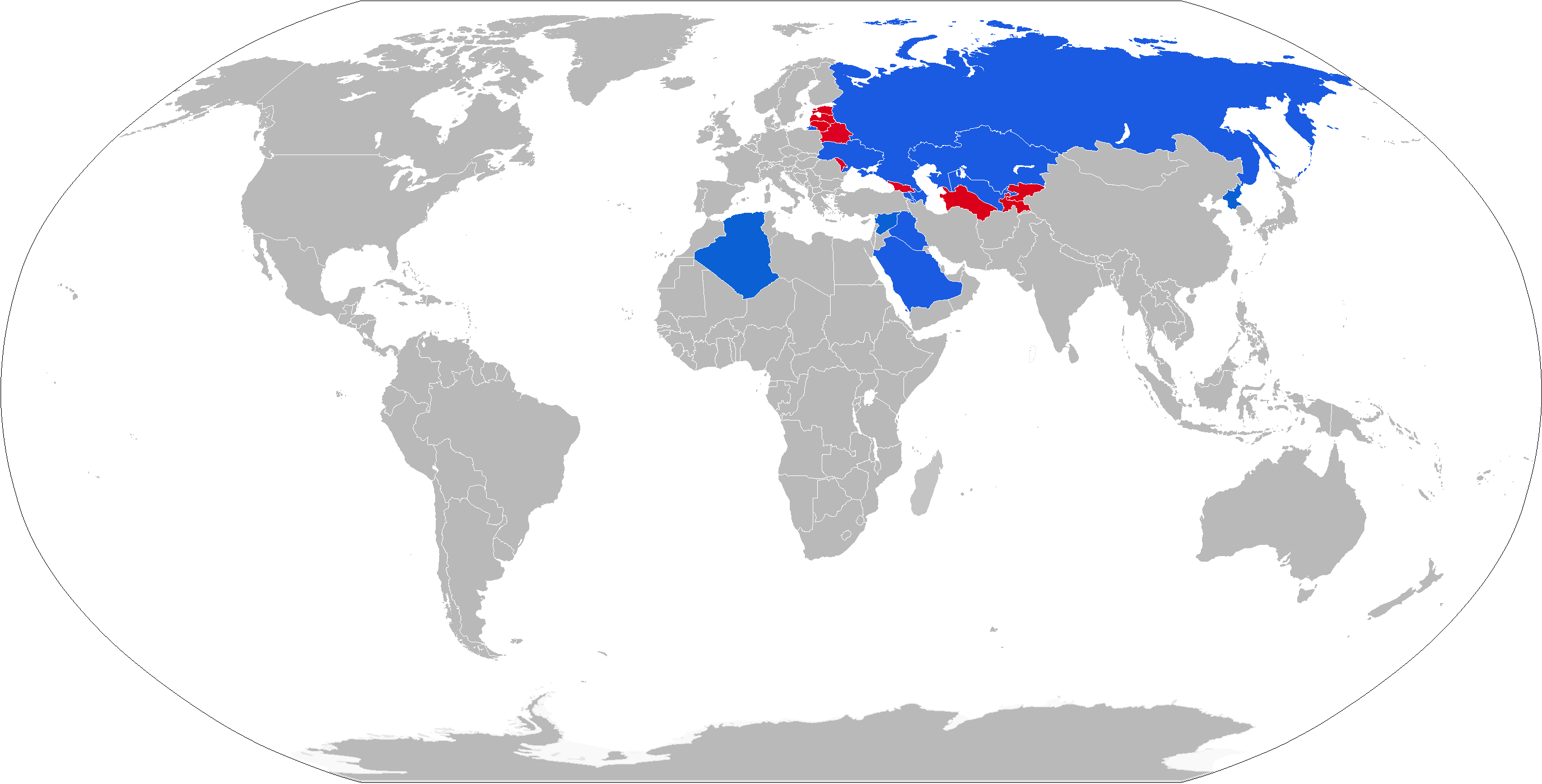
TOS-1 operators Current Former

=== Current operators ===
- Algeria – 18 (est.) TOS-1A (as of 2024). 4 reported to be received from Russia in 2016.
- Armenia –
- Azerbaijan – 17 TOS-1A (as of 2024). 36 reported to be received from Russia from 2013-2017.
- Iraq – 6+ TOS-1A (as of 2024). 10 reported to be received from Russia from 2014-2015.
- Kazakhstan – 3 TOS-1A (as of 2024). 3 reported to be received from Russia in 2011.
- Russia – 39 TOS-1A (as of 2024). According to the Oryx open-source intelligence website, 34 TOS-1A and 9 TZM-T destroyed, damaged or captured during the Russo-Ukrainian war up to December 2025. New batches of TOS-1A were delivered in September and November 2022 and again in November 2024 and November 2025. They have reportedly received additional protection.
- Saudi Arabia – 10 TOS-1A (as of 2024). 10 reported to be received from Russia in 2019. A 2017 memorandum of understanding included the technology transfer for the TOS-1A to Saudi Arabia.
- Tajikistan – "Some" TOS-1A (as of 2024). 4 reported to be received from Russia in 2022.

=== Status unknown ===
- Syria – 8+. Unknown whether these vehicles belonged to Russian or Syrian army. Not included in armament commissioned.
- Ukraine – at least 3 TOS-1As and 4 TZM-Ts captured during the Russian invasion of Ukraine. One was reportedly used in combat against Russian forces in early April 2022.

=== Former operators ===
- Soviet Union – Passed on to Russia.

== See also ==
- TOS-2 – (Russia)
- M270 Multiple Launch Rocket System – (United States)

== Sources ==
- The International Institute for Strategic Studies (2025). The Military Balance 2025. London: Routledge. ISBN 978-1-041-04967-8.
- Rivero, Jorge L. (December 2023). "Unleashing Fire and Fury: The TOS-1A's Impact in the Russo-Ukrainian War" (PDF). Infantry. Vol. 112, no. 4. Columbus, Georgia: U.S. Army Infantry School. pp. 30–35. ISSN 0019-9532.
