= List of people with given name Boris =

This is a list of notable people with the given name Boris:

== Aristocracy ==
- Boris I of Bulgaria (died 889), first ruler of the First Bulgarian Empire
- Boris II of Bulgaria (931–977), ruler of the First Bulgarian Empire
- Boris III of Bulgaria (1894–1943), ruler of the Kingdom of Bulgaria
- Boris Godunov (1552–1605), Tsar of Russia
- Grand Duke Boris Vladimirovich of Russia (1877–1943)
- Boris and Gleb (murdered c. 1015 to 1019), Russian princes, the first saints canonized in Kievan Rus' after its Christianization
- Boris Saxe-Coburg-Gotha (born 1997), Prince of Tarnovo, Duke in Saxony, pretender to the defunct Bulgarian throne

== A ==
- Boris Alexandrovich Alexandrov (1905–1994), Soviet composer
- Boris Aleksandrov (ice hockey) (1955–2002), Soviet and Kazakhstani ice hockey player

== B ==
- Boris Barnet (1902–1965), Soviet film director
- Boris Becker (born 1967), German professional tennis player
- Boris Bede (born 1989), French player of gridiron football
- Boris Berezovsky (businessman) (1946–2013), Russia's first billionaire businessman
- Boris Berezovsky (pianist) (born 1969), Russian pianist
- Boris Berman (chekist) (1901–1939), Soviet NKVD member active during the Great Purge
- Boris Berman (journalist) (born 1948), Russian journalist and broadcaster
- Boris Berman (musician) (born 1948), Russian pianist
- Boris Bizetić (born 1950), Serbian singer and songwriter
- Boris Blank (born 1952), Swiss artist and musician
- Boris Bobrinskoy (1925–2020), French priest of the Eastern Orthodox Church
- Boris Böhmann (born 1964), German conductor and composer
- Boris Bondarev (born 1980), Russian diplomat
- Boris Brejcha (born 1981), German DJ and music producer

== C ==
- Boris Casoy (born 1941), Brazilian journalist
- Boris Christoff (1914–1993), Bulgarian opera singer
- Boris Cheranovsky (1896–1960), Ukrainian aircraft designer

== D ==
- Boris Daenen (born 1989), stage name Netsky, electronic music producer and DJ
- Boris Davison (1908–1961), Russian-born Canadian mathematical physicist
- Boris Diaw (born 1982), French basketball player
- Boris Dlugosch (born 1968), house music producer
- Boris Dvornik (1939–2008), Croatian actor
- Boris Drangov (1872–1917), Bulgarian military officer and warfare pedagogue

== E ==
- Boris Ebzeyev (born 1950), Russian politician and judge

== F ==
- Boris Ford (1917–1998), British literary critic and educationalist
- Boris Frlec (1936–2026), Slovenian politician
- Boris Furlan (1894–1957), Slovenian jurist and politician

== G ==
- Boris Gardiner (born 1943), Jamaican singer-songwriter and bass guitarist
- Boris Gelfand (born 1968), Israeli chess grandmaster
- Boris Gromov (born 1943), Russian military and political figure, Governor of Moscow Oblast, one of the principal commanders of Soviet-Afghan War
- Boris M. Gombač (born 1945), Slovenian historian
- Boris Grebenshchikov (born 1953), Russian singer-songwriter; band leader of Aquarium
- Boris Grishayev (1925–1999), Soviet marathon runner
- Boris Gryzlov (born 1950), Russian politician, Interior Minister, Speaker of the State Duma, one of the leaders of United Russia
- Boris Mikhaylovich Gurevich (1937–2020), Soviet Olympic champion wrestler
- Boris Gurevich (wrestler, born 1931) (1931–1995), Soviet Olympic champion wrestler

== H ==
- Boris Henry (born 1973), German javelin thrower
- Boris Hoppek (born 1970), German contemporary artist
- Boris Hybner (1941–2016), Czech actor, director, and mime artist

== I ==
- Boris Izaguirre (born 1965), Venezuelan writer, TV host, screenwriter, journalist and showman

== J ==
- Boris Jacobsohn (1918–1966), American physicist
- Boris Johansson (born 1936), Swedish footballer
- Boris Johnson (born 1964), British politician, former Prime Minister of the United Kingdom and former Mayor of London
- Boris Jordan (born 1966), American investor involved in the privatization in Russia in the early 1990s
- Boris Jovanović (born 1972), Serbian footballer

== K ==
- Boris Kagarlitsky (born 1958), Russian academic and political dissident
- Boris Kalin (1905–1975), Slovenian sculptor
- Boris Karloff (1887–1969), English actor
- Boris Khmelnitsky (1940–2008), Russian actor
- Boris Kidrič (1912–1953), Slovenian communist official and resistance leader
- Boris Klyuyev (1944–2020), Russian actor
- Boris Kodjoe (born 1973), American actor
- Boris Kollár (born 1965), Slovak businessman and politician
- Boris Kravtsov (born 1922), Russian jurist and politician
- Boris Kustodiev (1878–1927), Russian artist and painter
- Boris Kočí (born 1964), Czech footballer
- Boris Krajný (born 1945), Czech pianist

== L ==
- Boris Lushniak, United States Public Health Service Commissioned Corps rear admiral who served as the acting Surgeon General of the United States
- Boris Lyatoshinsky (1895–1968), Ukrainian composer

== M ==
- Boris Maciejovsky, Austrian behavioral scientist
- Boris Marian (born 1934), Moldovan writer, translator, journalist and Soviet dissident
- Boris Messerer (born 1933), Soviet and Russian theater artist, set designer and teacher
- Boris Miletić (born 1975), Croatian politician and mayor of Pula
- Boris Mikšić (born 1948), Croatian businessman and politician

== N ==
- Boris Nachamkin (1933–2018), American basketball player
- Boris Nayfeld (born 1947), Belarusian gangster
- Boris Nemtsov (1959–2015), Russian scientist and politician

== O ==
- Boris Ord (1897–1961), British organist and choirmaster

== P ==
- Boris Pahor (1913–2022), Slovenian writer
- Boris Paichadze (1915–1990), Georgian football player
- Boris Palmer (born 1972), German politician
- Boris Pash (1900–1995), United States Army military intelligence officer
- Boris Pasternak (1890–1960), Soviet author; recipient, 1958 Nobel Prize in Literature
- Boris Perušič (born 1940), Czech volleyball player
- Boris Petrovsky (1908–2004), Russian surgeon and Soviet minister of health
- Boris Plotnikov (1949–2020), Russian actor
- Boris Podrecca (born 1940), Slovenian-Italian architect
- Boris Polak (born 1954), Israeli world champion and Olympic sport shooter
- Boris Pugo (1937–1991), Soviet Communist politician of Latvian origins
- Boris Zeebroek (born 1985), Belgian musician under the alias Bolis Pupul

== Q ==
- Boris Quercia (born 1966), Chilean filmmaker

== R ==
- Boris Razinsky (1933–2012), Soviet Olympic footballer and manager
- Boris Roatta (1980–1994), French child actor
- Boris Rösner (1951–2006), Czech actor
- Boris Rotman (1924–2021), Chilean American biologist
- Boris Rutović (born 2006), Serbian judoka

== S ==
- Boris Said (born 1962), American race car driver
- Boris Sarafov (1872–1907), Bulgarian Army officer and revolutionary
- Boris Shapiro (1944–2026), Russian-born German poet.
- Boris Shcherbina (1919–1990), Ukrainian Soviet politician who supervised the crisis management of both the 1986 Chernobyl disaster and the 1988 Armenian earthquake
- Boris Serebryakov (1941–1971), Soviet serial killer and mass murderer known as the "Kuybyshev Monster"
- Boris Shaposhnikov (1882–1945), Soviet Russian general, Chief of the Staff of the Red Army, and Marshal of the Soviet Union, one of the principal commanders on the Eastern Front and the Battle of Moscow
- Count Boris Sheremetev (1652–1719), Russian diplomat and general field marshal during the Great Northern War
- Boris Sidis (1867–1923), Ukrainian psychiatrist
- Boris Spassky (1937–2025), Russian chess player
- Boris Starling, British novelist and screenwriter
- Boris Stürmer (1848–1917), Russian lawyer, Master of Ceremonies at the Russian Court, member of the Russian Assembly, Prime Minister of Russia, Minister of Internal Affairs and Foreign Minister of the Russian Empire
- Boris Susko (born 1970), Slovak politician
- Borys Szyc (born 1978), Polish actor

== T ==
- Boris Tadić (born 1958), Yugoslav-Serb politician, President of Serbia from 2004 to 2012
- Borys Tarasyuk (born 1949), Ukrainian politician
- Boris Titulaer (born 1980), Dutch singer
- Boris Trajkovski (1956–2004), politician, President of Macedonia from 1999 to 2004

== U ==
- Boris Ugarov (1922–1991), Russian painter
- Boris Ugrimov (1872–1941), Russian electrical engineer
- Boris Ulianich (1925–2023), Italian politician
- Boris Unbegaun (1898–1973), Russian-German linguist
- Boris Uspenskij (born 1937), Russian linguist, philologist, semiotician, historian of culture
- Boris Uspensky (1927–2005), Russian painter
- Boris Utin (1832–1872), Russian professor and lawyer
- Boris Uvarov (1886–1970), Russian–British entomologist

== V ==
- Boris Vallejo (born 1941), Peruvian-American fantasy artist
- Boris van der Ham (born 1973), Dutch politician and actor
- Boris Verho, Finnish poet
- Boris Vladimirov (1905–1978), Soviet Army lieutenant general and a Hero of the Soviet Union
- Boris Vian (1920–1959), French polymath
- Boris Volosatîi (born 1956), Moldovan professor and member of the Parliament of Romania

== W ==
- Boris Williams (born 1951), British musician; former member of The Cure

== Y ==
- Boris Yakovenko (1884–1949), Russian philosopher
- Boris Yampolsky (1912–1972), Russian writer
- Boris Yaro (1938–2020), American photojournalist
- Boris Yavitz (1923–2009), Dean of Colombia Business School
- Boris Yefimov (1900–2008), Russian political cartoonist
- Boris Yefimov (athlete) (born 1935)
- Boris Yeflov (1926–2013), Soviet-Russian painter
- Boris Yegorov (1937–1994), Soviet physician and cosmonaut
- Boris Yelensky (1889–1974), Russian anarchist propagandist
- Boris Yeltsin, President of Russia from 1991 to 1999
- Boris Yoffe (born 1968), Russian-born Israeli composer
- Boris Yotov (born 1996), Azerbaijani rower
- Boris Yugai (1957–2010), Kyrgyz major general
- Boris Yukhananov (1957–2025), Russian stage and film director
- Boris Yulin (born 1967), Russian author
- Boris Grigoryevich Yusupov (1695–1759), Russian nobleman
- Boris Nikolaevich Yusupov (1794–1849), Russian politician
- Boris Yuzhin (born 1942), American spy against the Soviet Union

== Z ==
- Boris Zaborov (1935–2021), Belarusian-French artist
- Boris Zaitchouk (born 1947), Soviet hammer thrower
- Boris Zakhava (1896–1976), Soviet and Russian actor and theatre director
- Boris Zakhoder (1918–2000), Russian poet, translator and children's writer
- Boris Zala (born 1954), Slovak politician
- Boris Zapryagaev (1922–2000), Russian ice hockey player
- Boris Zarkov (born 1974), Russian restaurateur and entrepreneur
- Boris Zavadovsky (1895–1951), soviet biologist
- Boris Zaytsev (writer) (1881–1972), Russian writer
- Boris Mikhaylovich Zaytsev (1937–2000), Ice hockey player
- Boris Zeisser (born 1968), Dutch architect
- Boris Zeldovich (1944–2018), Soviet and Russian physicist
- Boris Zemelman (born 1967), American neuroscientist
- Boris Zernikow (born 1964), German pediatrician
- Boris Zhitkov (1882–1938), Soviet and Russian writer
- Boris Zhukov (born 1959), American professional wrestler
- Boris Zhuravlyov (1946–2019), Russian footballer and coach
- Boris Zilber (born 1949), British logician
- Boris Zimin (born 1968), Russian businessman and philanthropist
- Boris Zingarevich (born 1959), Russian businessman
- Boris de Zirkoff (1902–1981), American Theosophist
- Boris Zivkovic (handballer) (born 1992), Austrian handball player
- Boris Zloković (born 1984), Montenegrin retired water polo player
- Boris Zolotaryov (born 1953), Russian politician
- Boris Zoriktuyev (1949–1988), Russian boxer
- Boris Zubarev (1875–1952), Russian physicist
- Boris Zubov (born 1942), Russian sprinter
- Boris B. Zvyagin (1921–2002), Russian mineralogist and crystallographer

== Fictional characters ==
- Boris Badenov, the main antagonist in the 1960s animated cartoons The Rocky and Bullwinkle Show
- Boris Kropotkin, Jewish character in the television show Rugrats
- Boris Tepes Dracula from the Shaman King series

== See also ==
- Borys, a given name and a surname
