= Zuborev =

Zuborev (Russian: Зуборев) is a Russian surname. Notable people with the surname include:

- Leonid Zuborev (born 1943), Soviet author
- Sergei Zuborev (born 1983), Russian ice hockey player

== See also ==
- Zubarev
