= Shipilov =

Shipilov (Russian: Шипилов) is a Russian masculine surname, its feminine counterpart is Shipilova. It may refer to

- Anton Shipilov (born 1973), Russian football coach and former player
- Natalya Shipilova (born 1979), Russian handball player
- Vladimir Shipilov (born 1972), Russian football player
