= Zubarev =

Zubarev (Russian: Зубарев) or Zubareva (Russian: Зубарева; feminine) is a common Russian surname. Notable people with the surname include:

- Alexander Zubarev (born 1979), Ukrainian chess grandmaster
- Andrei Zubarev (born 1987), Russian ice hockey player
- Boris Zubarev (1875–1952), Russian physicist
- Dmitry Zubarev (1917–1992), Russian theoretical physicist
- Igor Zubarev (born 1966), Russian politician
- Nikolai Zubarev (1894–1951), Russian chess master
- Prokopy Zubarev (1886–1938), Soviet politician
- Roman Zubarev (born 1963), Russian-Swedish scientist
- Viktor Zubarev (footballer) (1973–2004), Kazakhstani footballer
- Viktor Zubarev (politician) (born 1961), Russian politician
- Vladimir Zubarev (born 1993), Russian footballer
- Yevgeni Zubarev (born 1967), Russian footballer
