= Yevgeni Zubarev =

Russian footballer

Personal information
- Full name: Yevgeni Viktorovich Zubarev
- Date of birth: 2 February 1967 (age 59)
- Height: 1.81 m (5 ft 11 1/2 in)
- Positions: Defender; midfielder

Senior career*
Years	Team	Apps	(Gls)
1983–1985	FC Fakel Voronezh	0	(0)
1988	FC Khimik Semiluki (amateur)		
1989	FC Fakel Voronezh	1	(0)
1989–1990	FC Khimik Semiluki	40	(1)
1990	FC Shakhtyor Shakhty	14	(0)
1992	FC Fakel Voronezh	8	(0)
1992	FC Shakhtyor Shakhty	21	(0)
1993	FC Shakhtostroitel Koksovy		
1994–1995	FC Shakhtyor Shakhty	22	(2)
1995	FC Lokomotiv Liski	3	(1)
1995–1996	FC Ratusha Kamianets-Podilskyi	3	(0)
- * Club domestic league appearances and goals

Yevgeni Viktorovich Zubarev (Russian: Евгений Викторович Зубарев; born 2 February 1967) is a former Russian football player.
