= Anton Shipilov =

Russian footballer and coach

Personal information
- Full name: Anton Vladimirovich Shipilov
- Date of birth: 7 March 1973 (age 53)
- Place of birth: Voronezh, Russian SFSR
- Height: 1.82 m (5 ft 11 1/2 in)
- Position: Midfielder

Youth career
- DYuSShOR-15 Voronezh

Senior career*
Years	Team	Apps	(Gls)
1990	FC Khimik Semiluki	28	(0)
1991	FC Buran Voronezh	20	(1)
1991–1999	FC Fakel Voronezh	170	(24)

International career
1993	Russia U-21	2	(0)

Managerial career
- 2013–2014: FC Lokomotiv Liski (assistant)
- * Club domestic league appearances and goals

Anton Vladimirovich Shipilov (Russian: Антон Владимирович Шипилов; born 7 March 1973) is a Russian football coach and a former player.

Shipilov played football for his hometown side FC Fakel Voronezh until he suffered a career-ending injury in 1997.
