= Boris Yeflov =

Soviet-Russian painter

Yeflov Boris Aleksandrovich
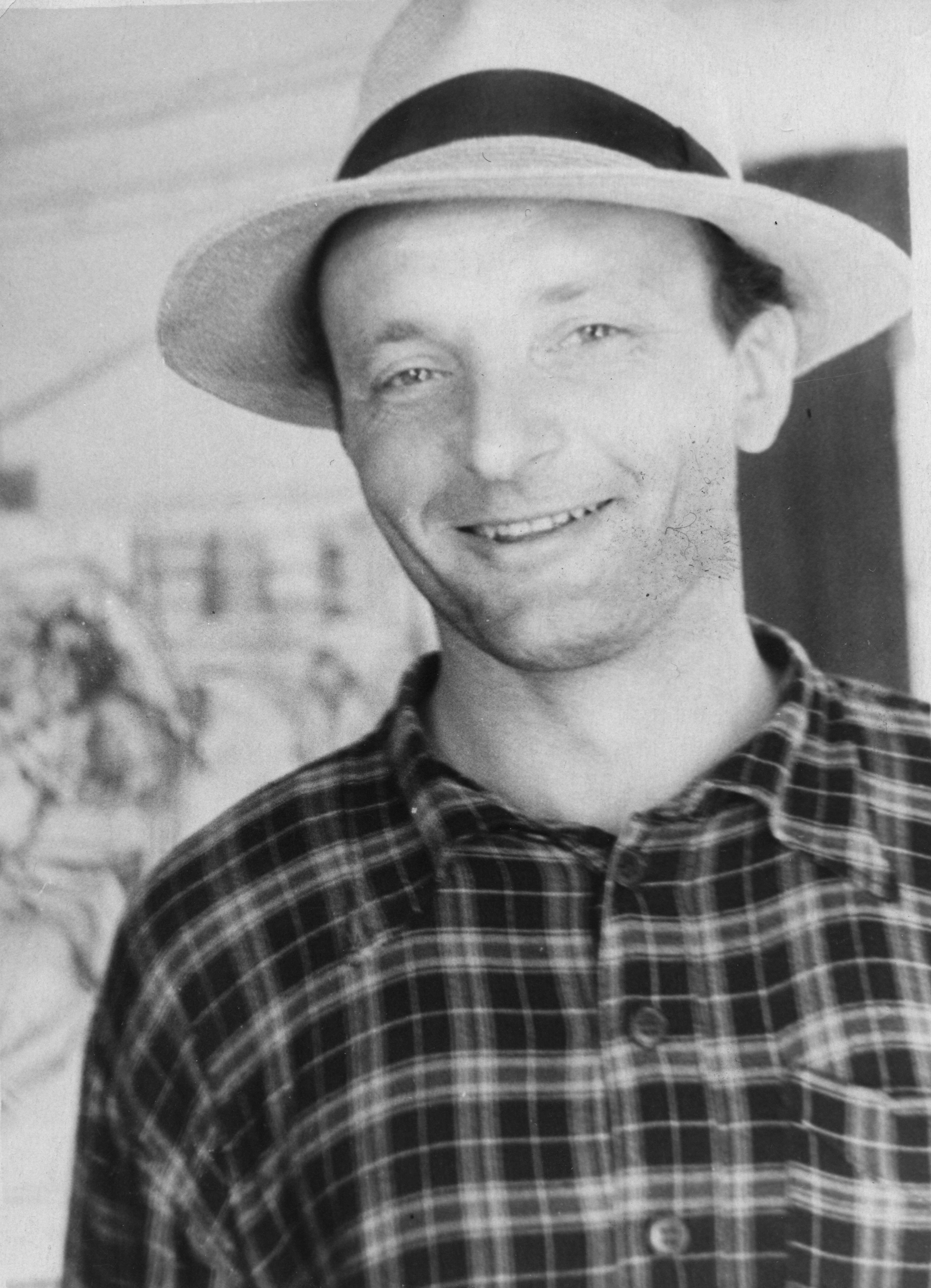
- Born: December 31, 1926; Village Selishche, Rayon Borisoglebsky, Oblast Yaroslavl, Russia
- Died: March 17, 2013 (aged 86); Kostroma, Kostroma Oblast, Russia
- Known for: Painting
- Movement: Realism
- Awards: Order of the Patriotic War (2nd class)

Boris Alexandrovich Yeflov (Russian: Борис Александрович Ефлов; born 31 December 1926, Village Selishche, Rayon Borisoglebsky, Oblast Yaroslavl – died 17 March 2013, Kostroma) – Soviet/Russian painter, drawing artist, and master of rural landscape.

== Biography ==
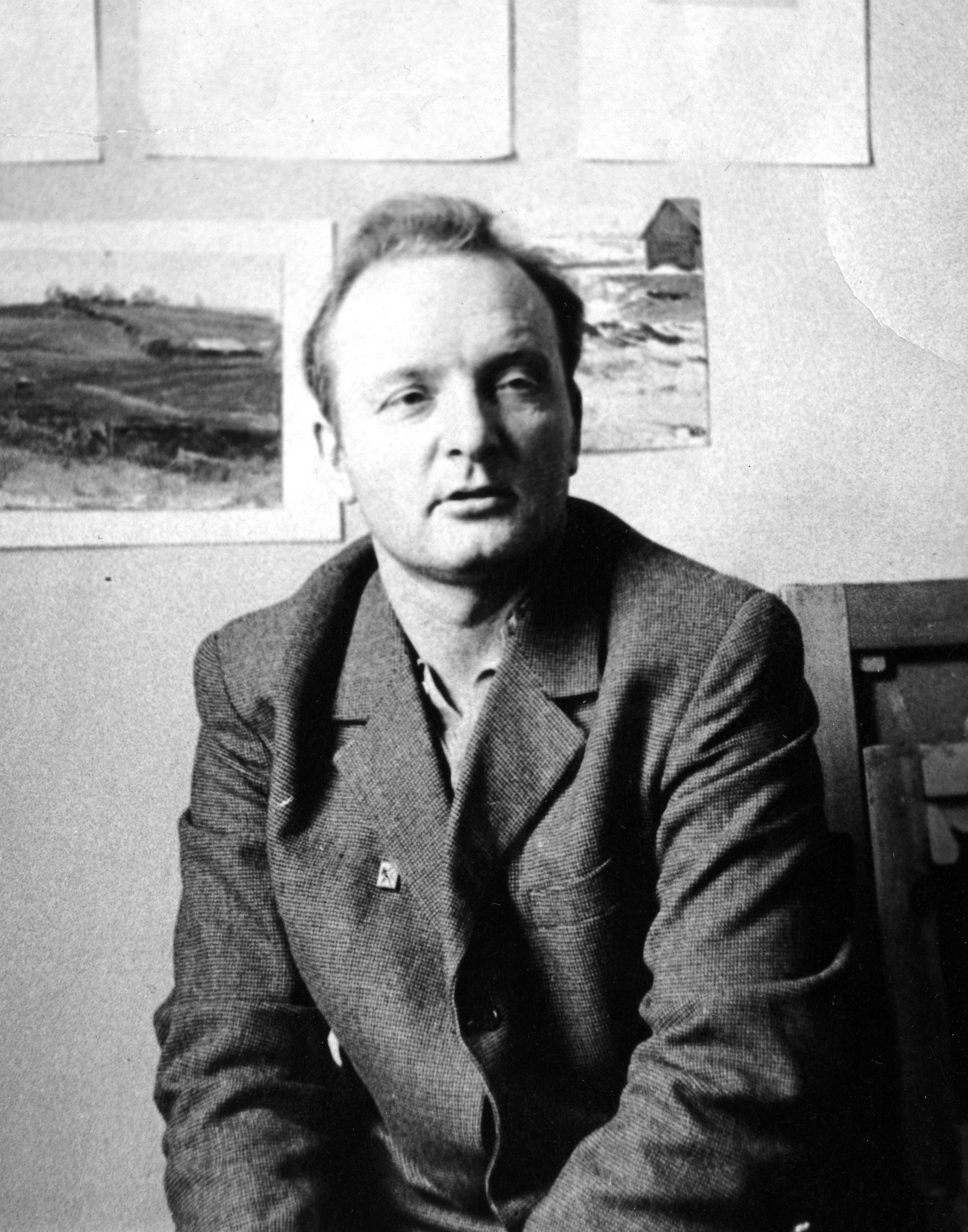
Boris Yeflov in 1966

=== Family ===
Boris Alexandrovich Yeflov was born on 31 December 1926 in Selishche village, Borisoglebsky Rayon, Yaroslavl Oblast, not far from the deployment of the military unit where his father was serving in the army. His father Yeflov Aleksandr Grigorievich was a career army officer and his mother Kolchina Klavdiya Vasilyevna was born into a well-off peasant family. When quite young, Boris was left without his father, who was arrested and executed by shooting in 1938, however posthumously rehabilitated in the subsequent years. For this reason, the family was forced to move to their friends’ home in Kostroma.

As a child, Boris took a great interest in drawing, making copies and imitating classical works of famous painters. Because of the dire need and poverty of the family Boris volunteered to join the army although he was not even seventeen.

=== Army ===
After a short military schooling, Boris was ordered to the operating units of the Black Sea Fleet. He served aboard the Krasny Krym guards cruiser, and in the ensuing years through to his discharge, aboard the destroyer Ognevoi as a gun layer. In the course of the infrequent leaves he attended drawing courses at an art studio in Sevastopol. The preserved drawings of that time were exhibited at various thematic exhibitions.

=== Kostroma ===
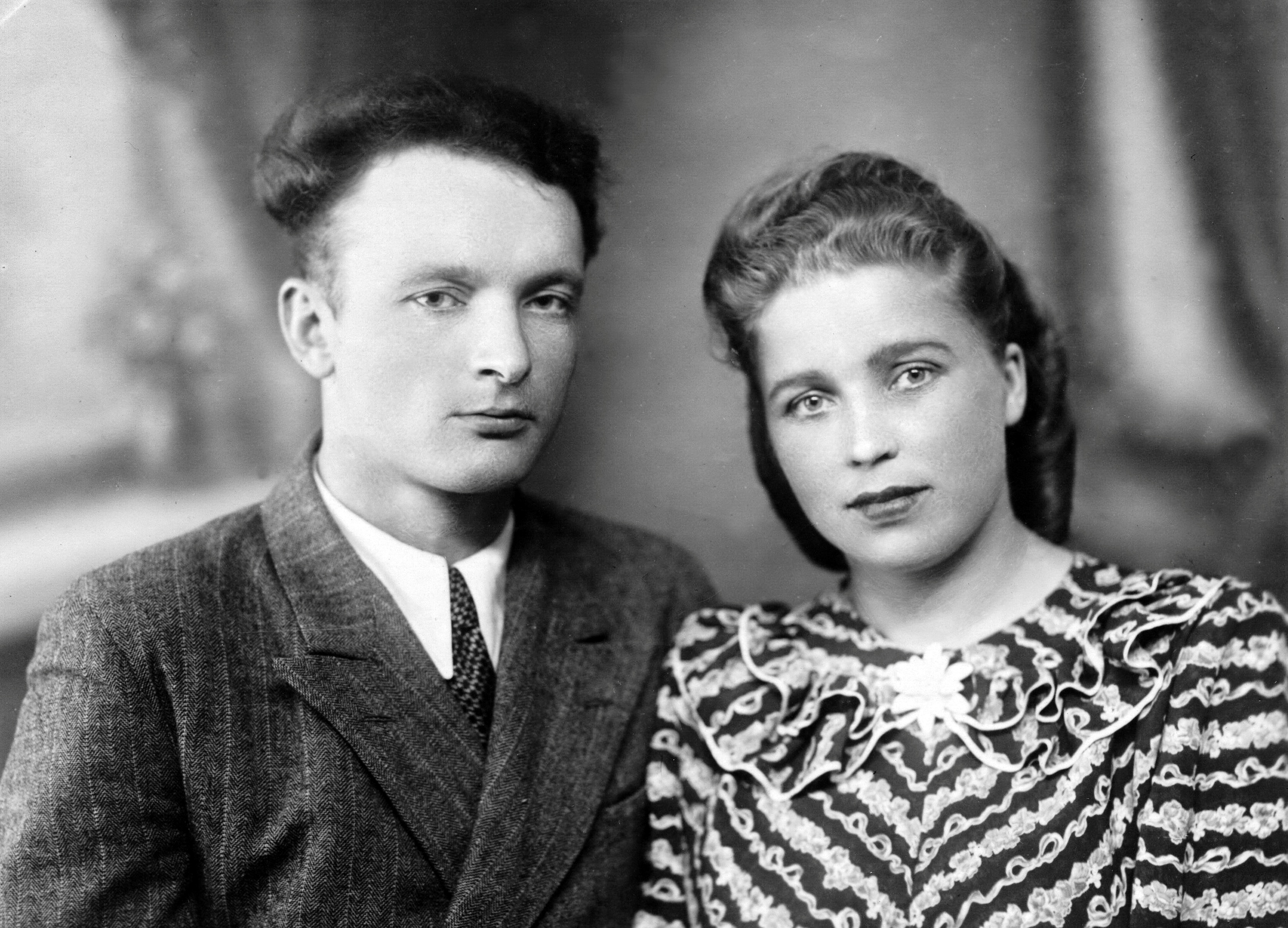
Before the Wedding, in 1950...

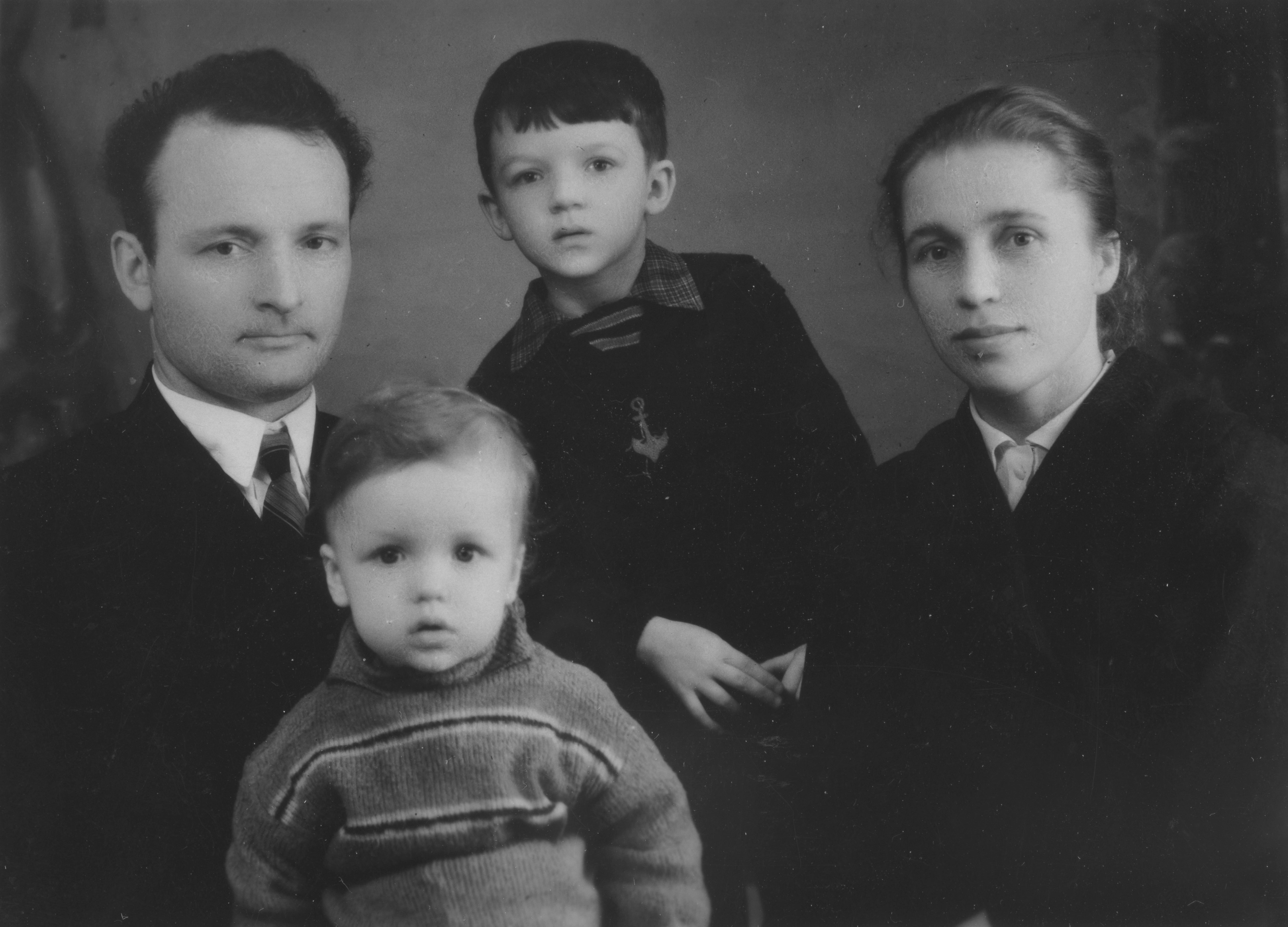
The Yeflov family in 1961

When he came back home, in 1951, he started to work at Kostroma Puppet Theater as a scene-painter. In 1952 Boris Yeflov entered marriage with Anisimova (Yeflova) Valentina Alexandrovna, who gave birth to two sons Vladimir (1955) and Aleksandr (1959). 1953 to 1958 he studied at Kostroma Art School. Afterwards through to his retirement, he worked in the studios of the Art Foundation of the Russian Federation.

Being a painter by both vocation and profession, Boris would spend time painting en plain air. Inspired by the Russian countryside, he drew multitudes of sketches, later turning them in his studio into unique paintings such as "Indian Summer", "Leaf Fall" and "by the River".

His trips to the small town Kirillov in Vologda Oblast gave rise to a series of the most famous water-colours of the painter including Corner Tower, The Road to Church, The Holy Gates, etc.

During his visit to Severomorsk, Boris was inspired by the unforgettable austere beauty of the northern nature. This magical attraction of the North brought him later to Karelia. It was the first of his numerous tours to this land. Gaining great satisfaction from these landscapes, he produced several of his best and monumental paintings, which he called Karelia and Karelian Stones.

As of 1957, he participated in numerous exhibitions, most of which were one-man shows. Paintings by Boris Eflov are sold and actively find their new owners at large European auctions (Catawiki-curated online auction, painting “In the Winter Backwater”, 1960, auction date 06.01.2024).

He died on 17 March 2013 at the age of 86 in Kostroma. Boris Yeflov was interred in the Ilyinskoye village not far from Kostroma.

== Gallery ==
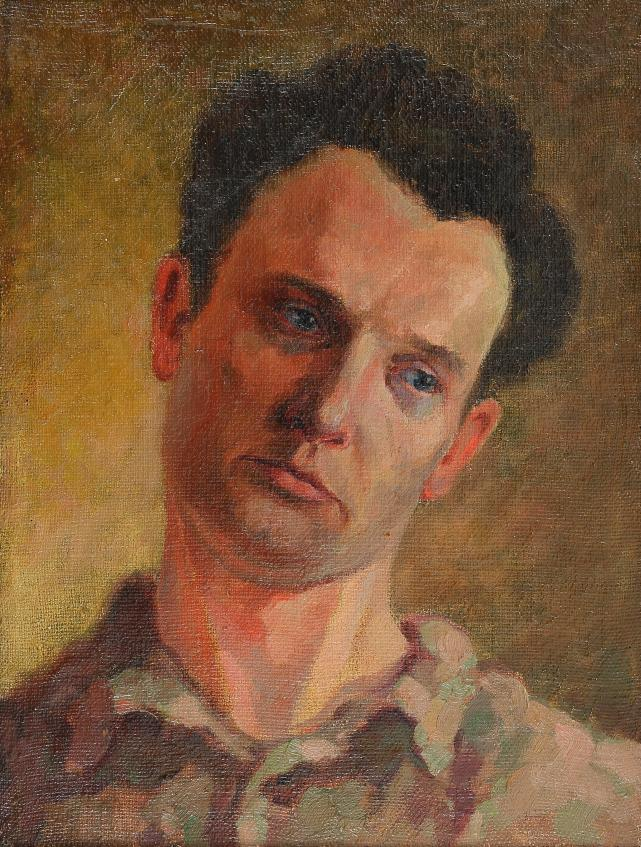
Self-Portrait, 1957

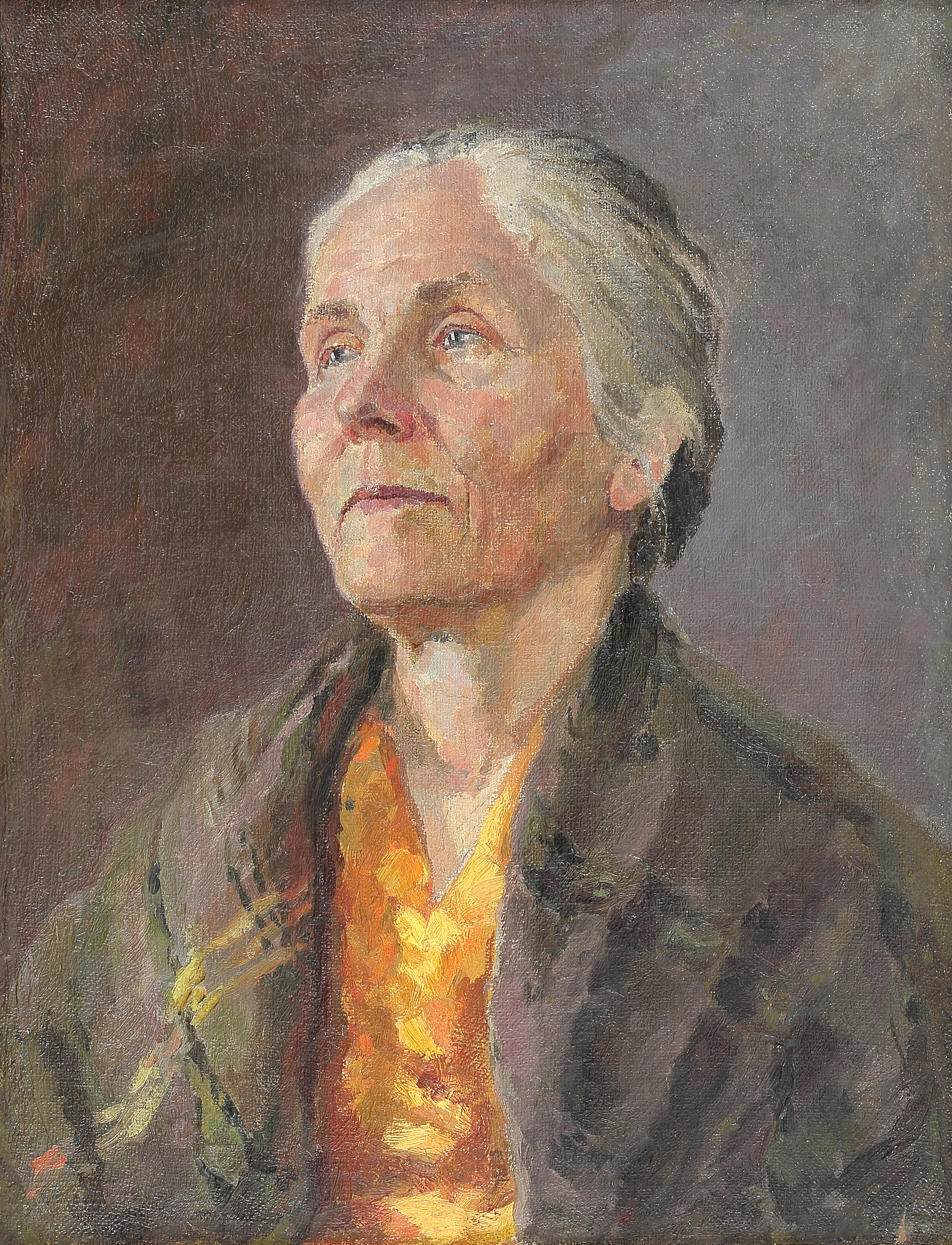
Mum, 1957

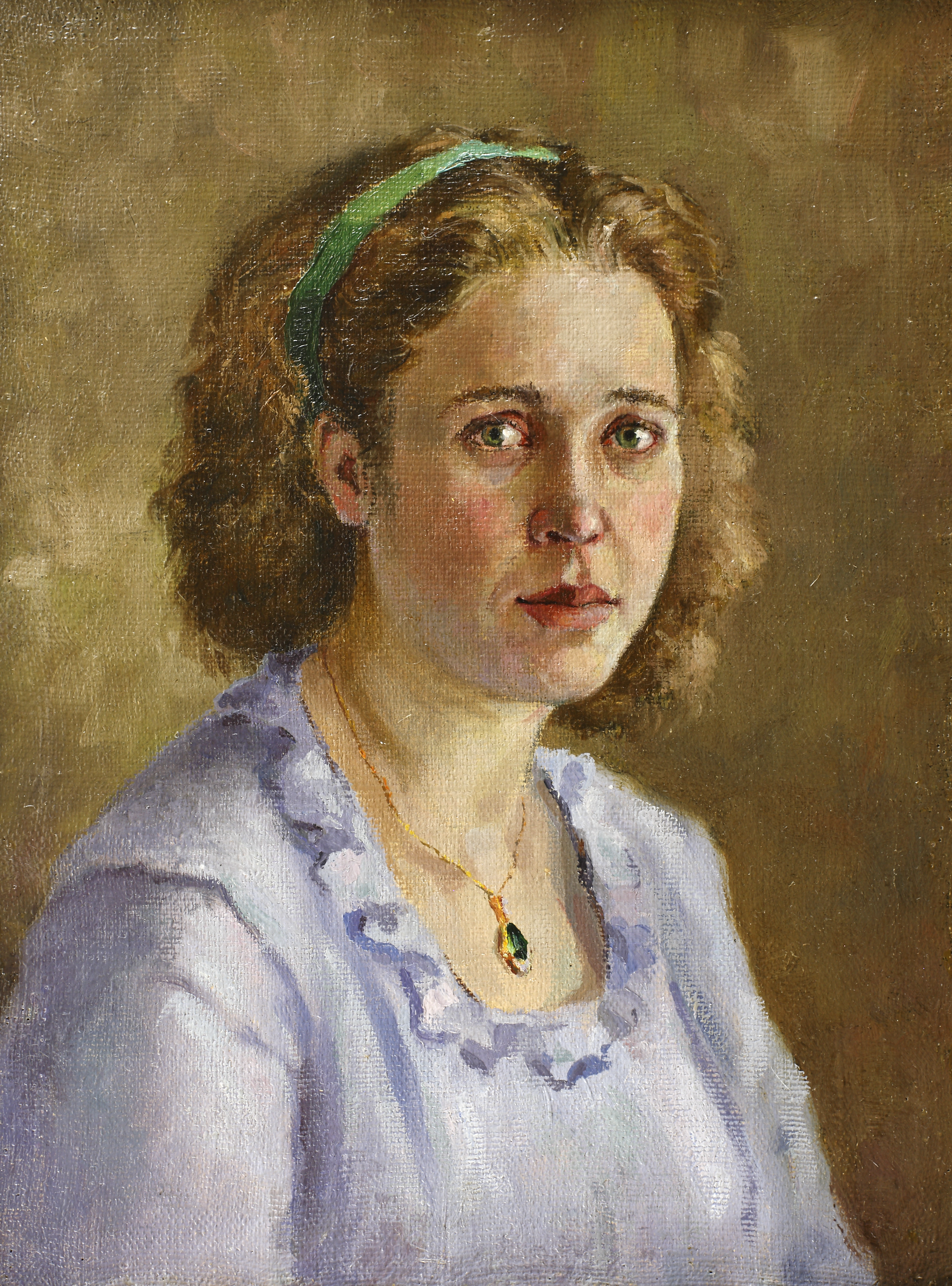
Valentina, 1957

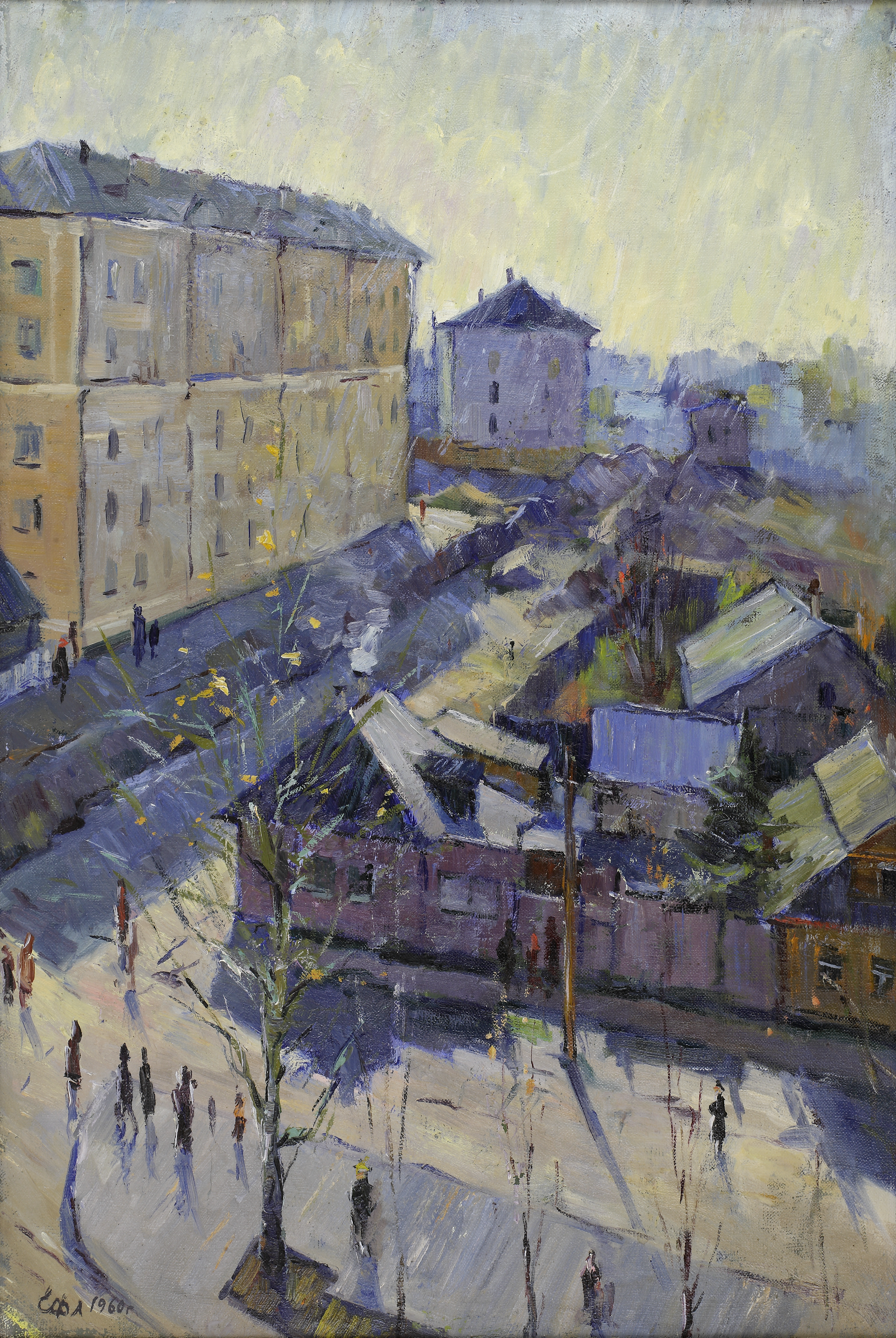
Station District, 1960

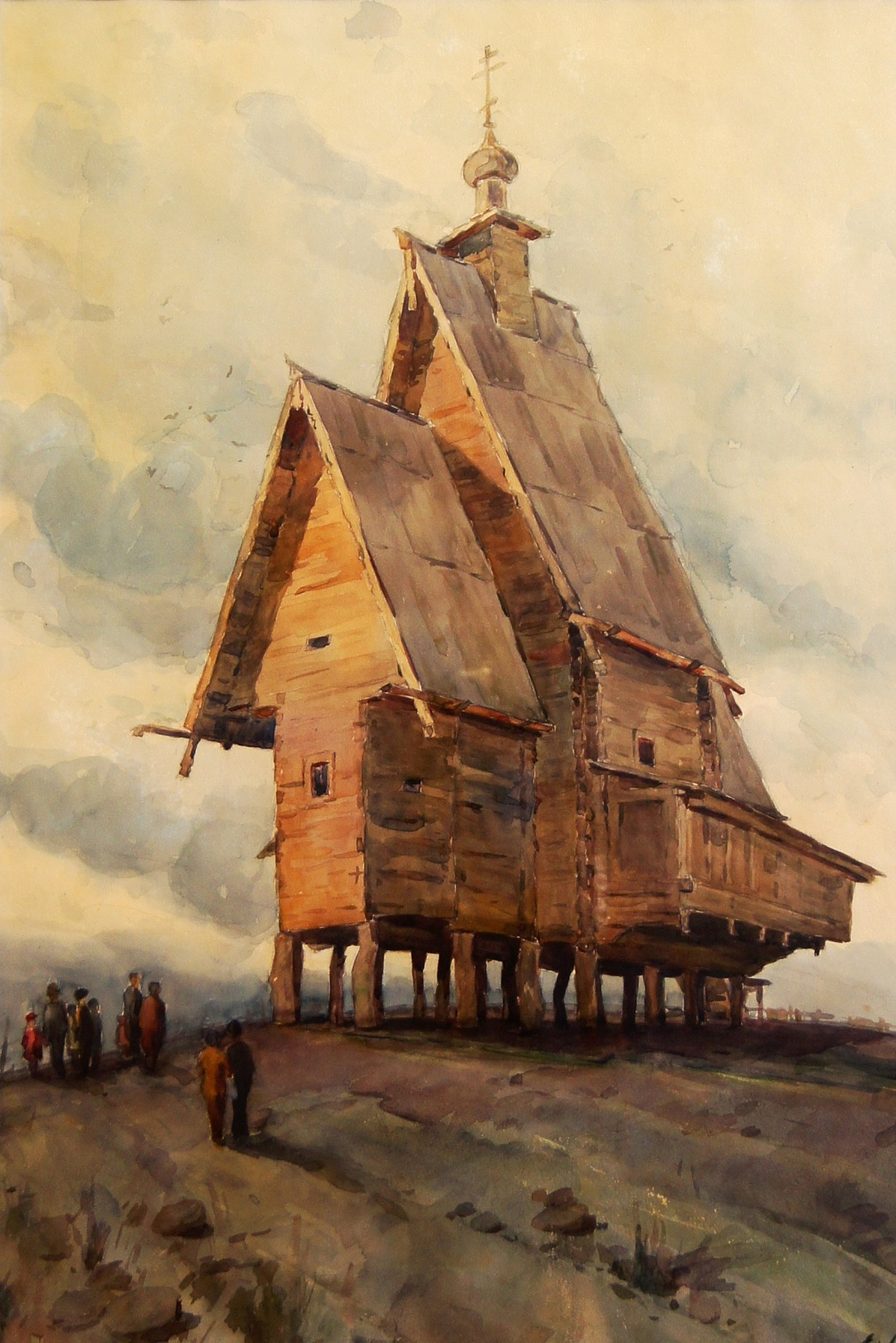
Church from Spas-Vyozhy Village, 1966

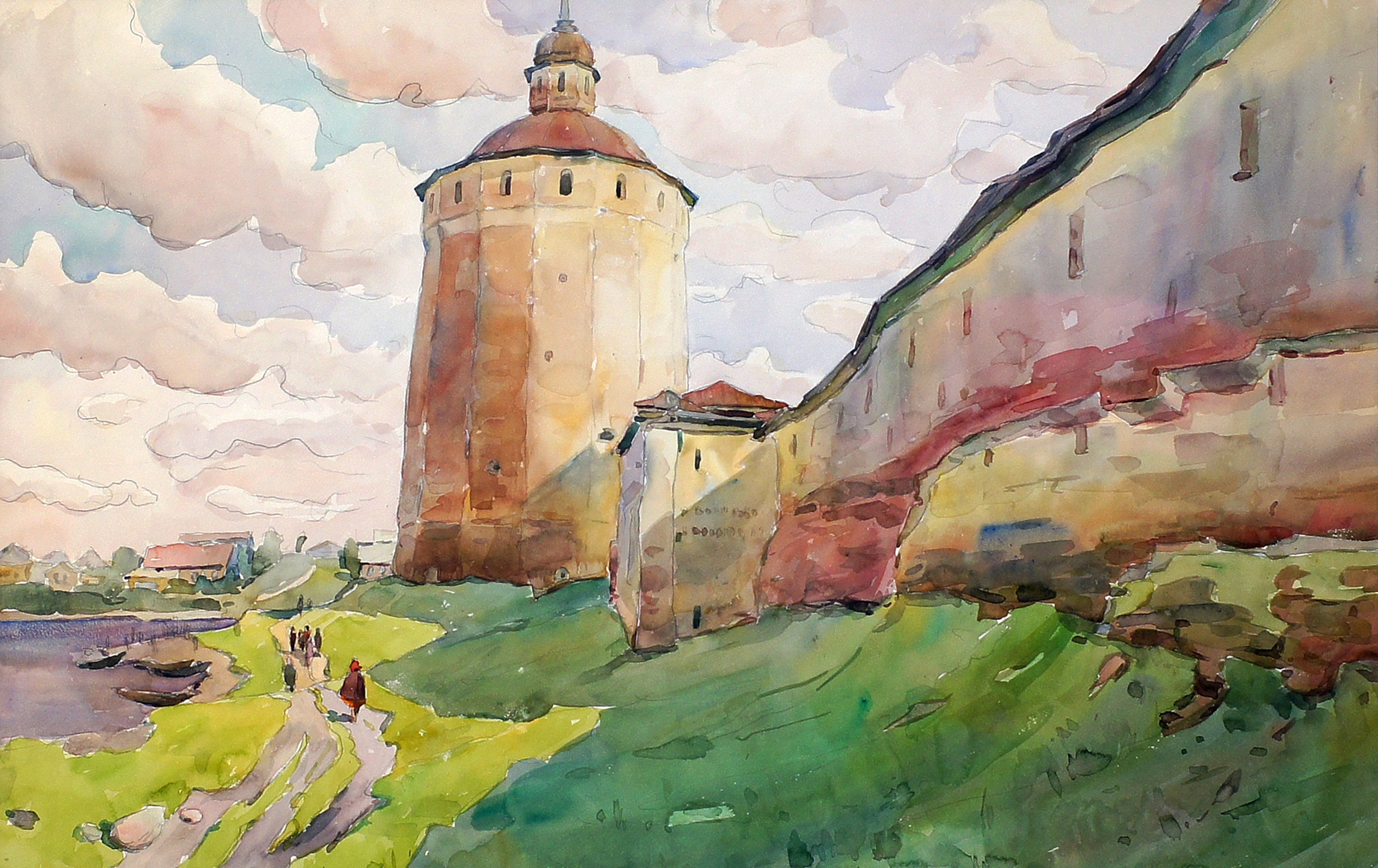
Corner Tower, 1967

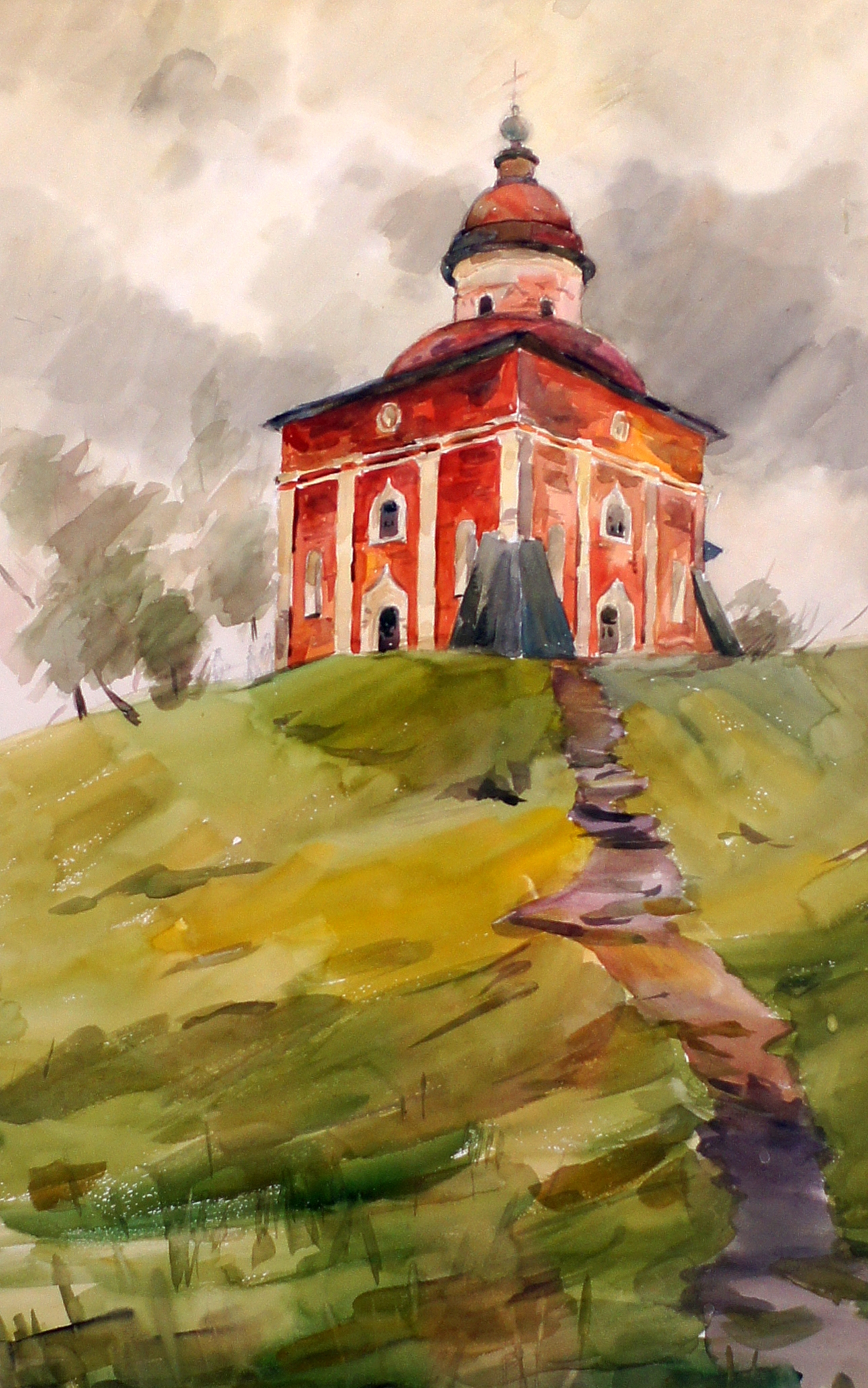
The Road to Church, 1968

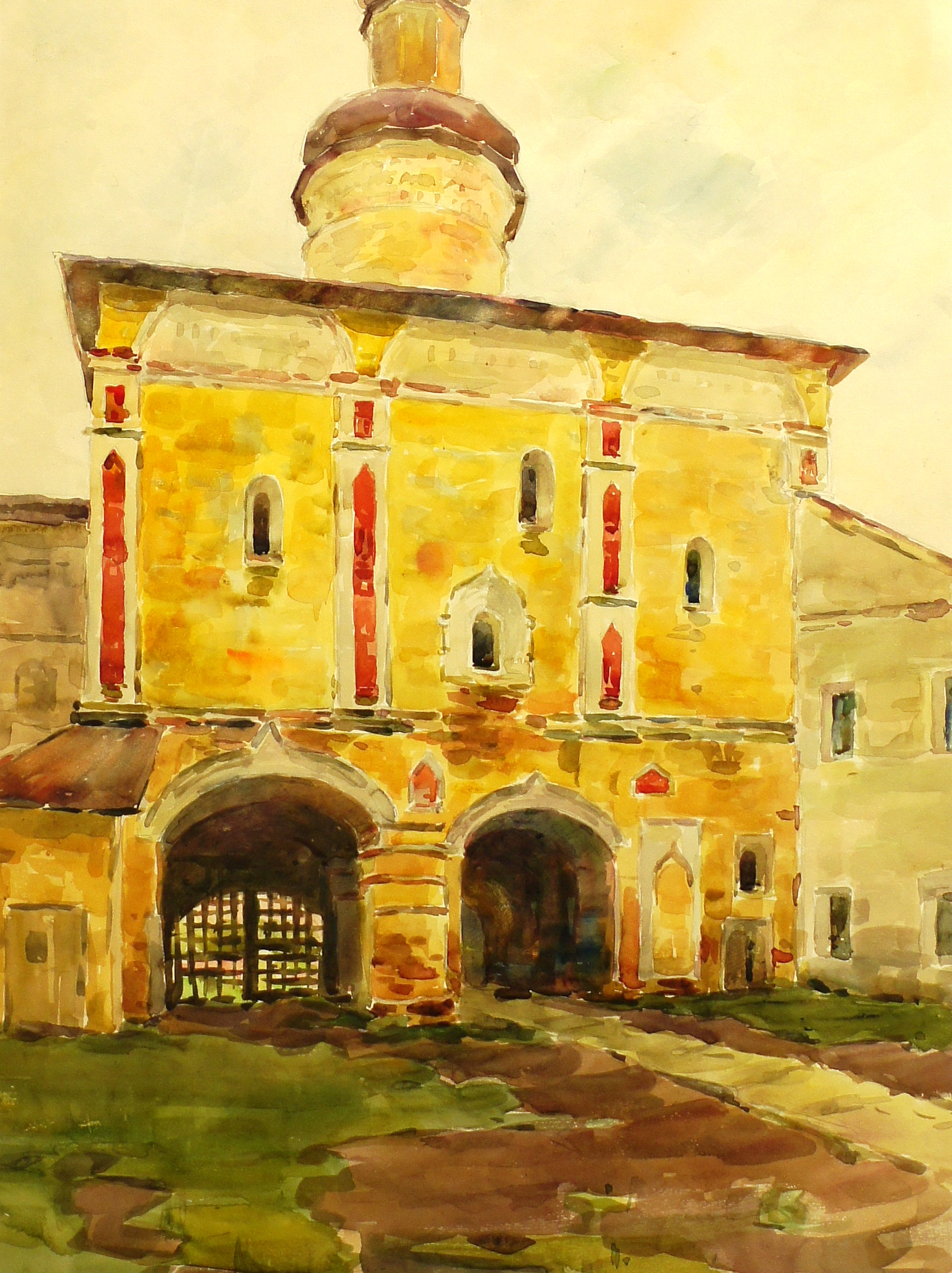
The Holy Gates, 1968

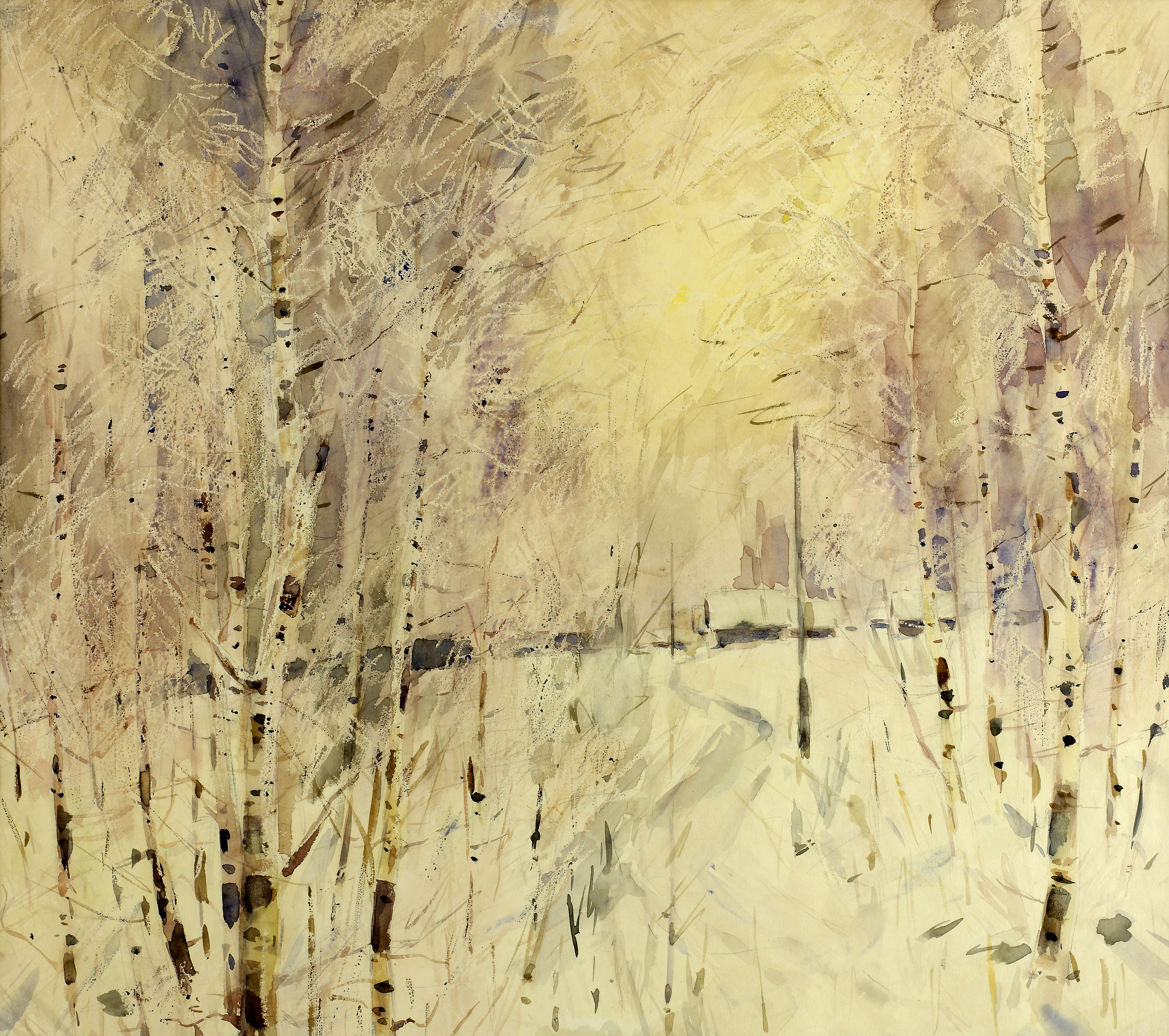
Frost and Sun, 1971

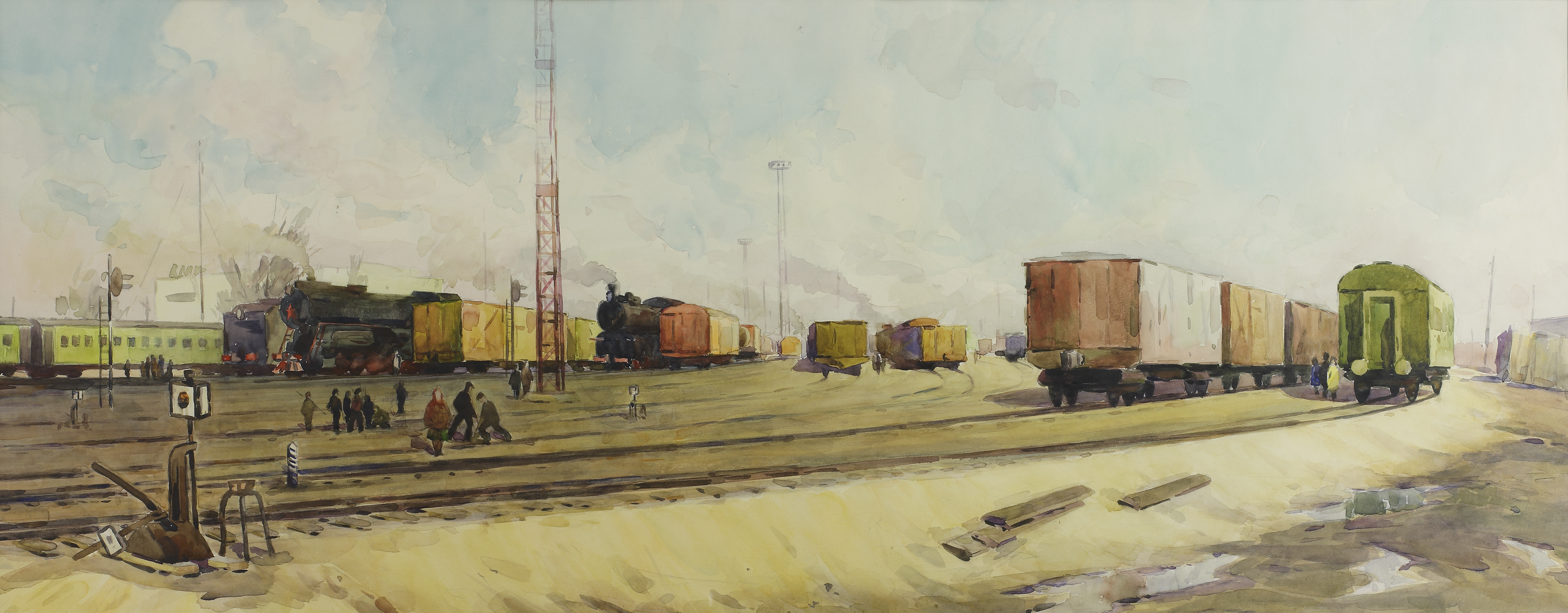
Train Station, 1972

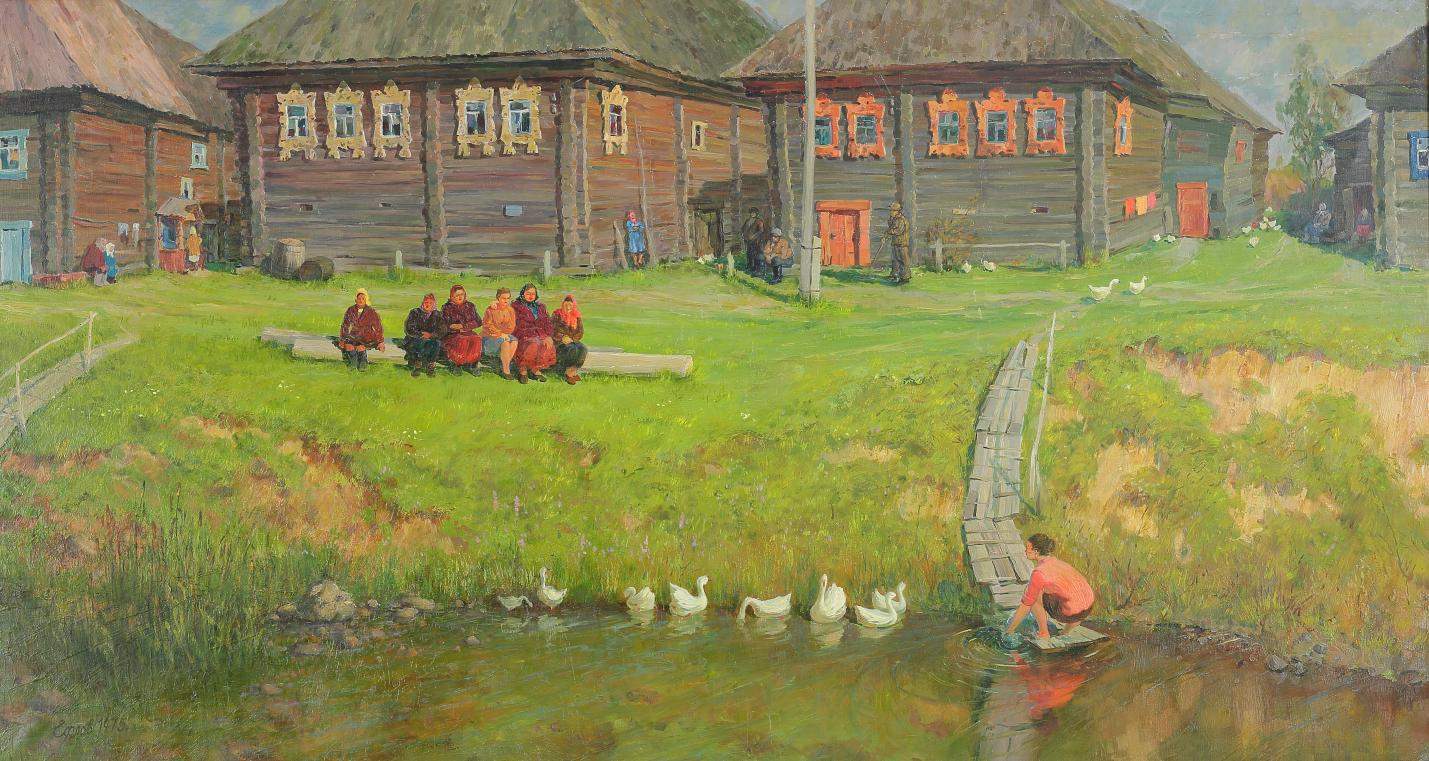
By the River, by the River... 1975

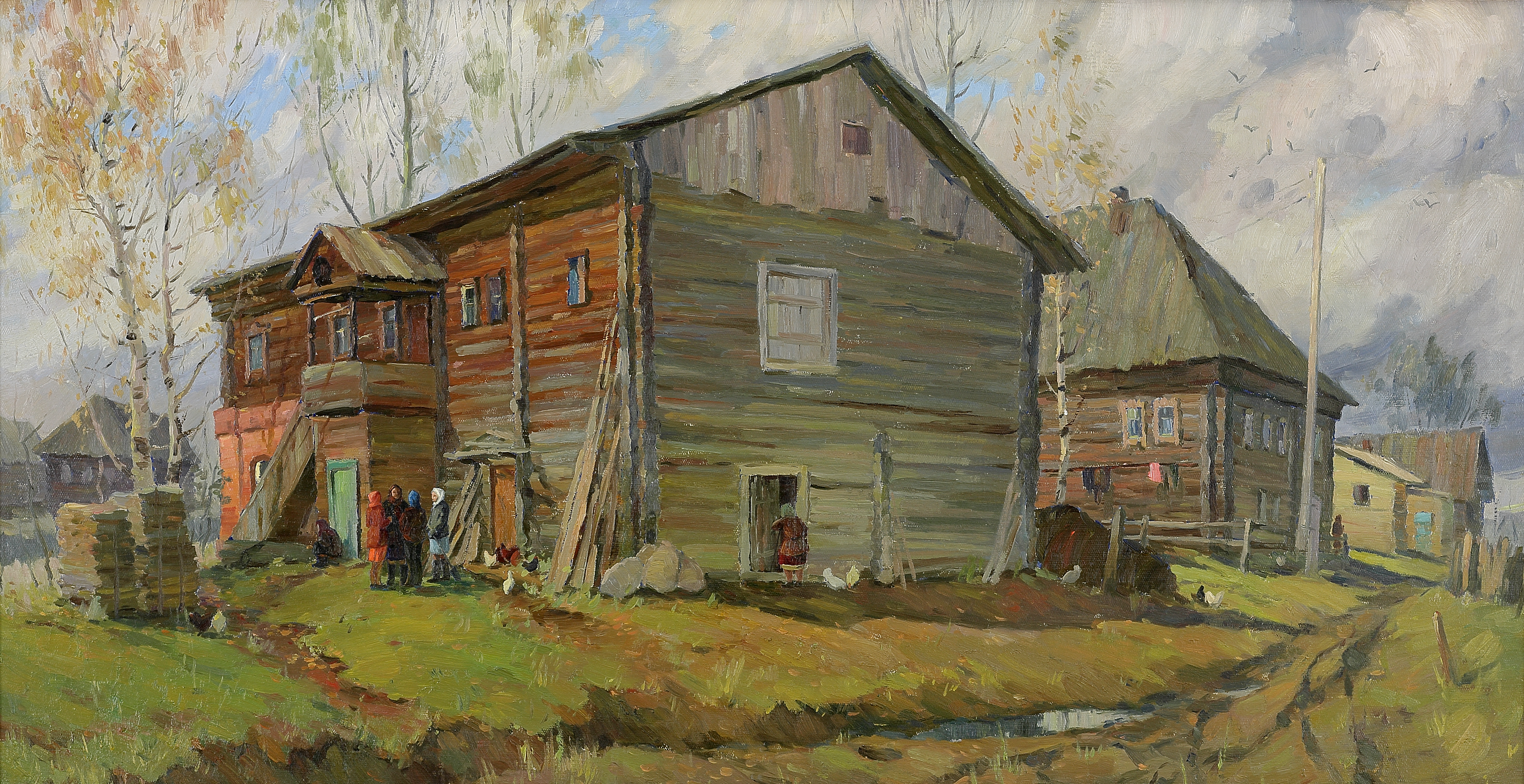
Countryside in October, 1978

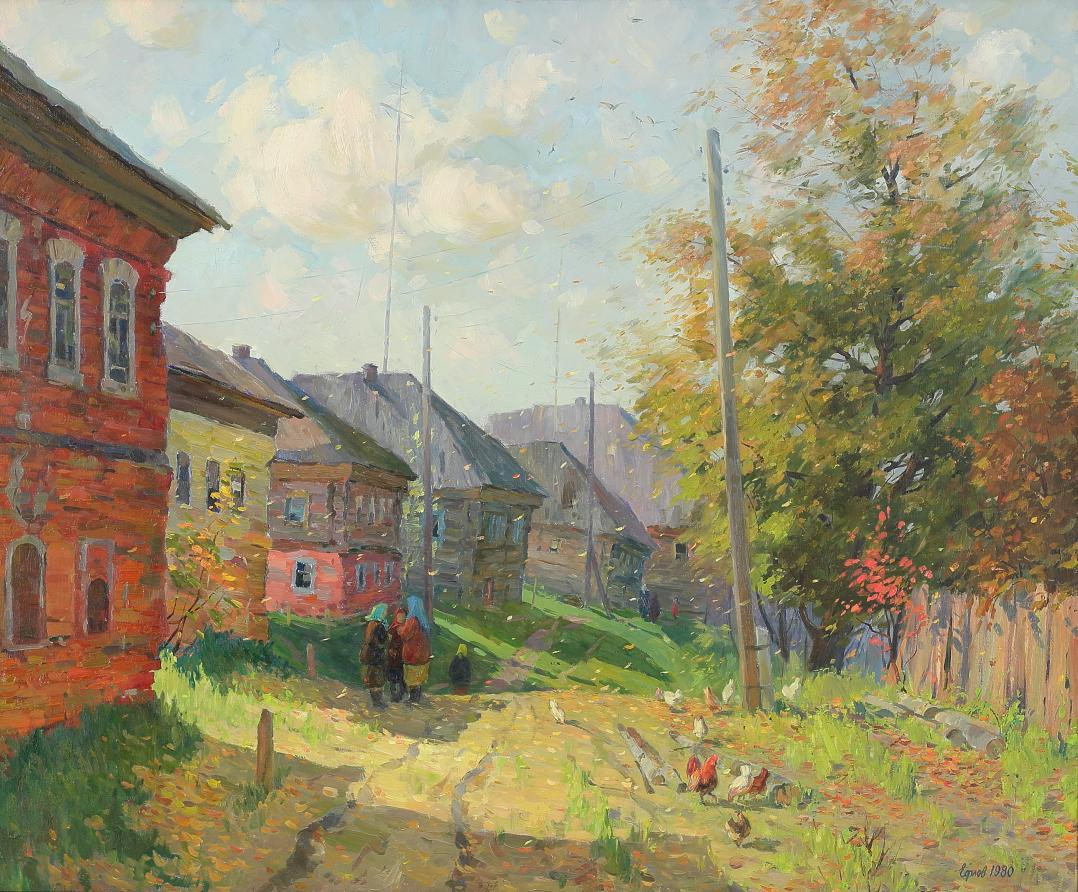
Leaf Fall, 1982

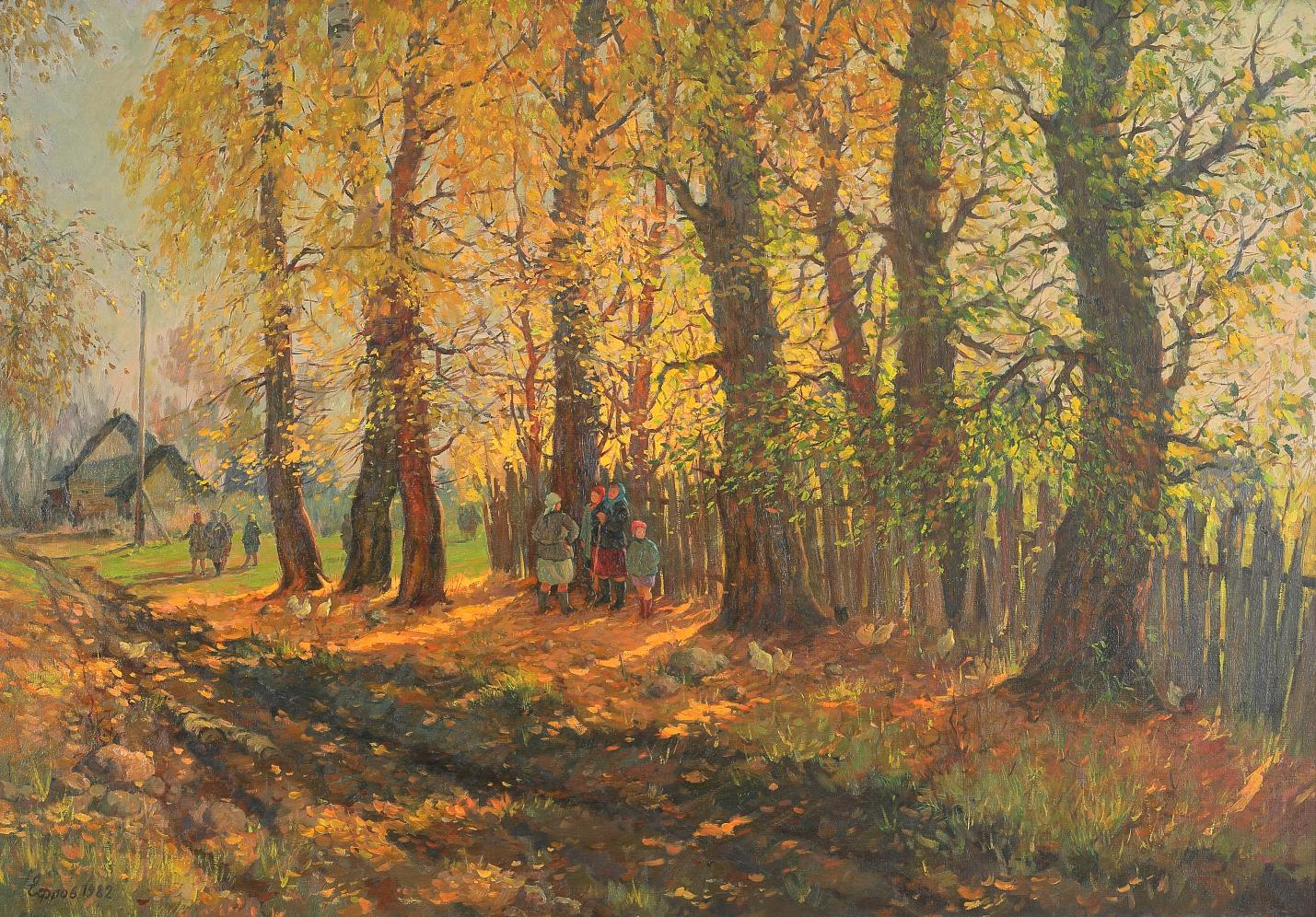
Indian Summer, 1982

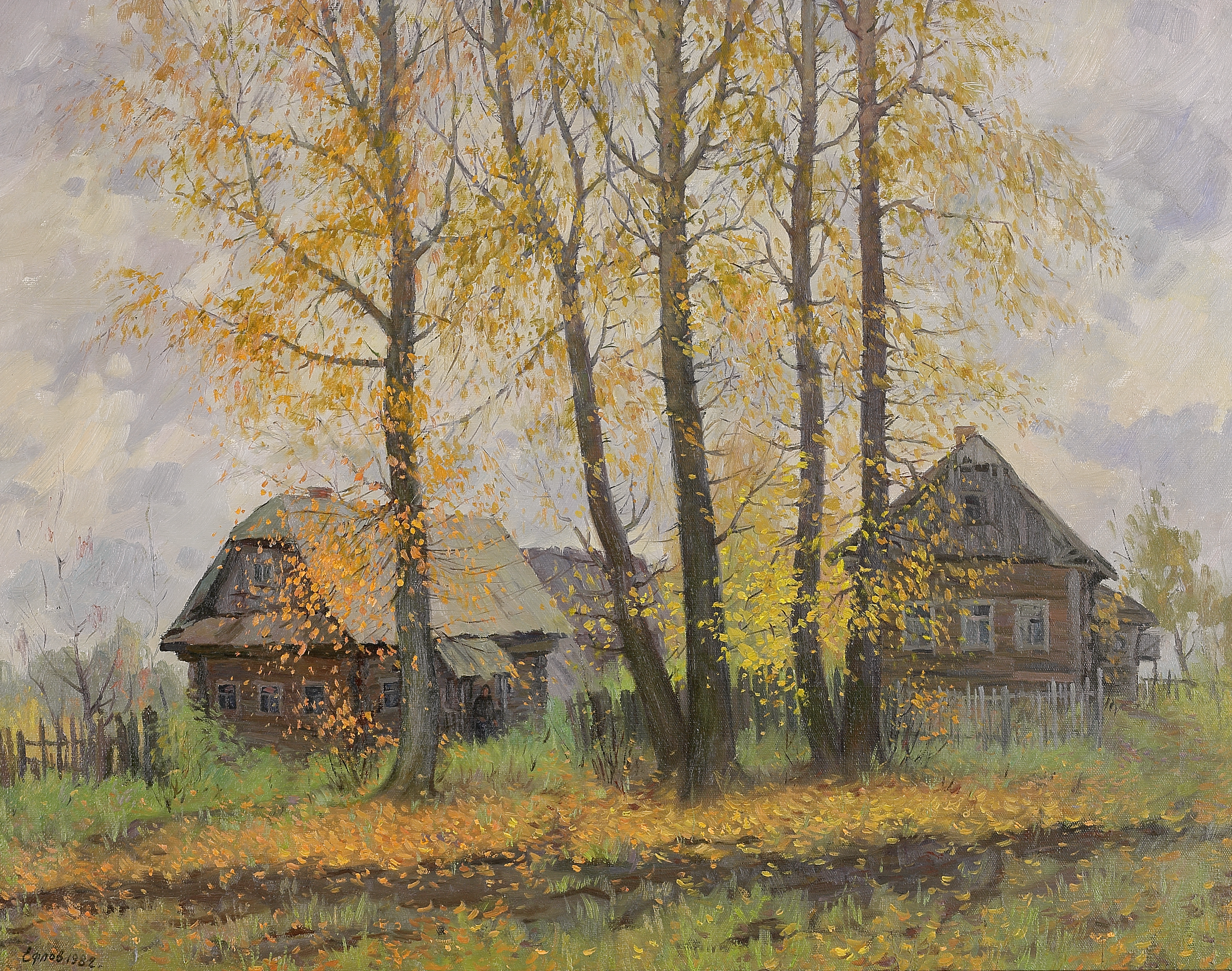
Autumnal Melancholy, 1982

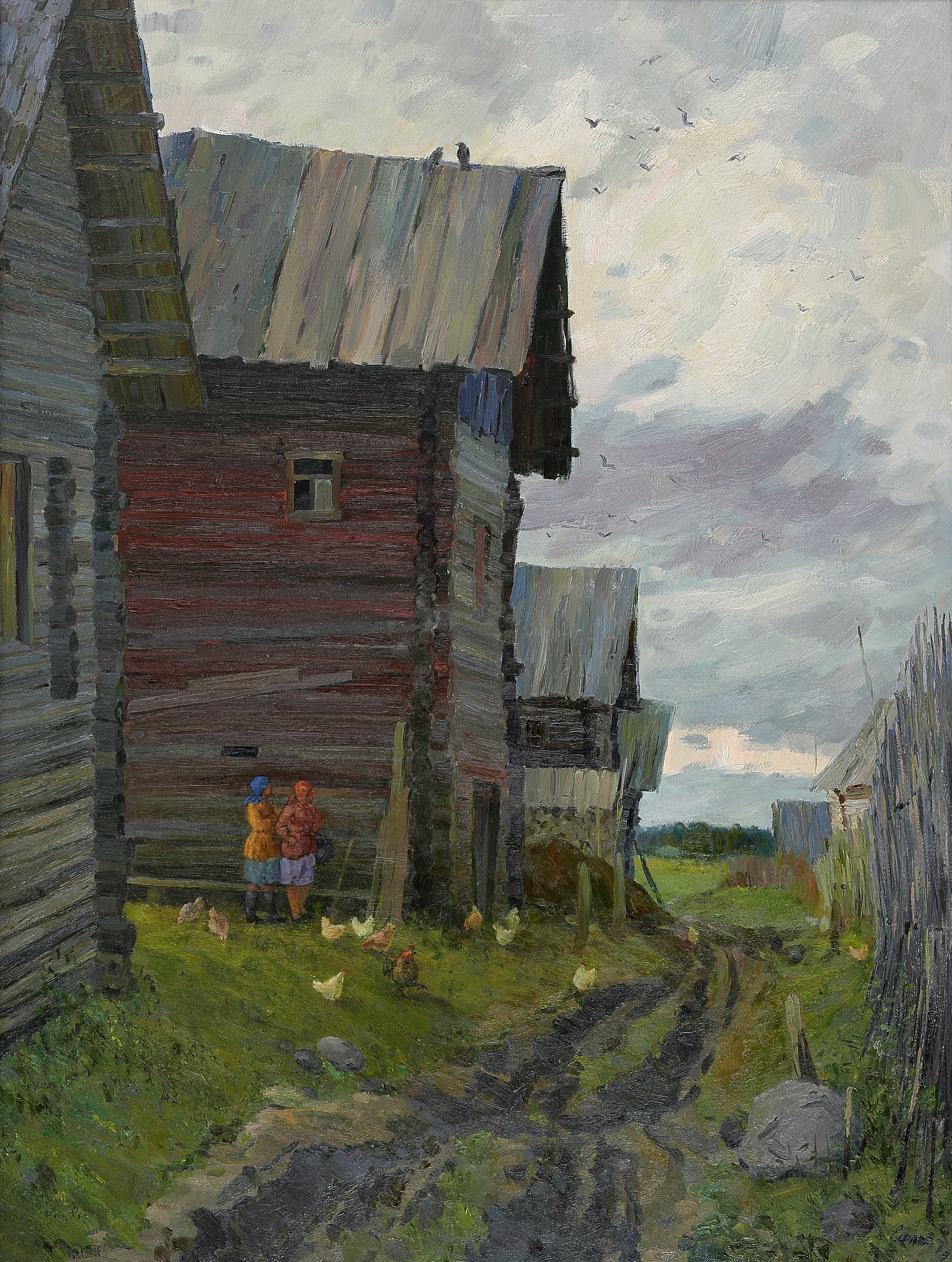
Village Backyard, 1986

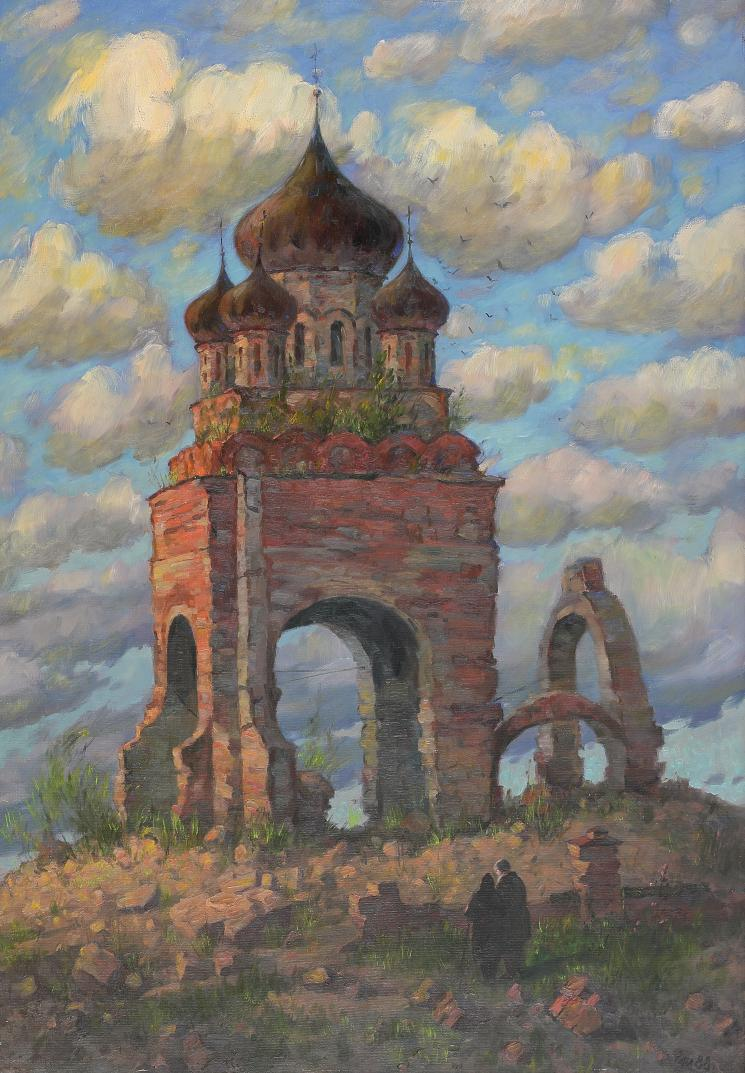
At the Ruins of Memory, 1988

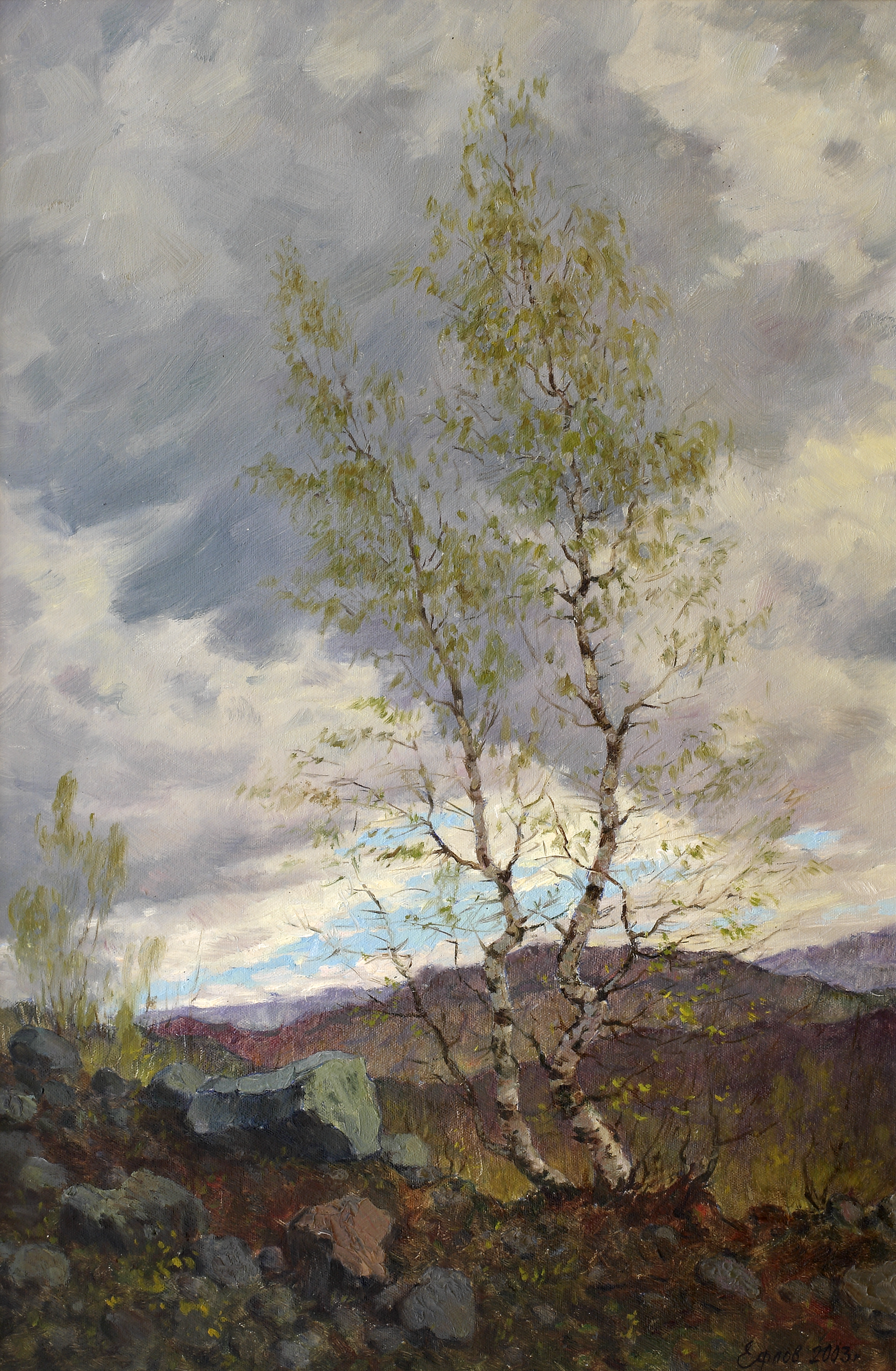
The Eternity and One Day, 1993

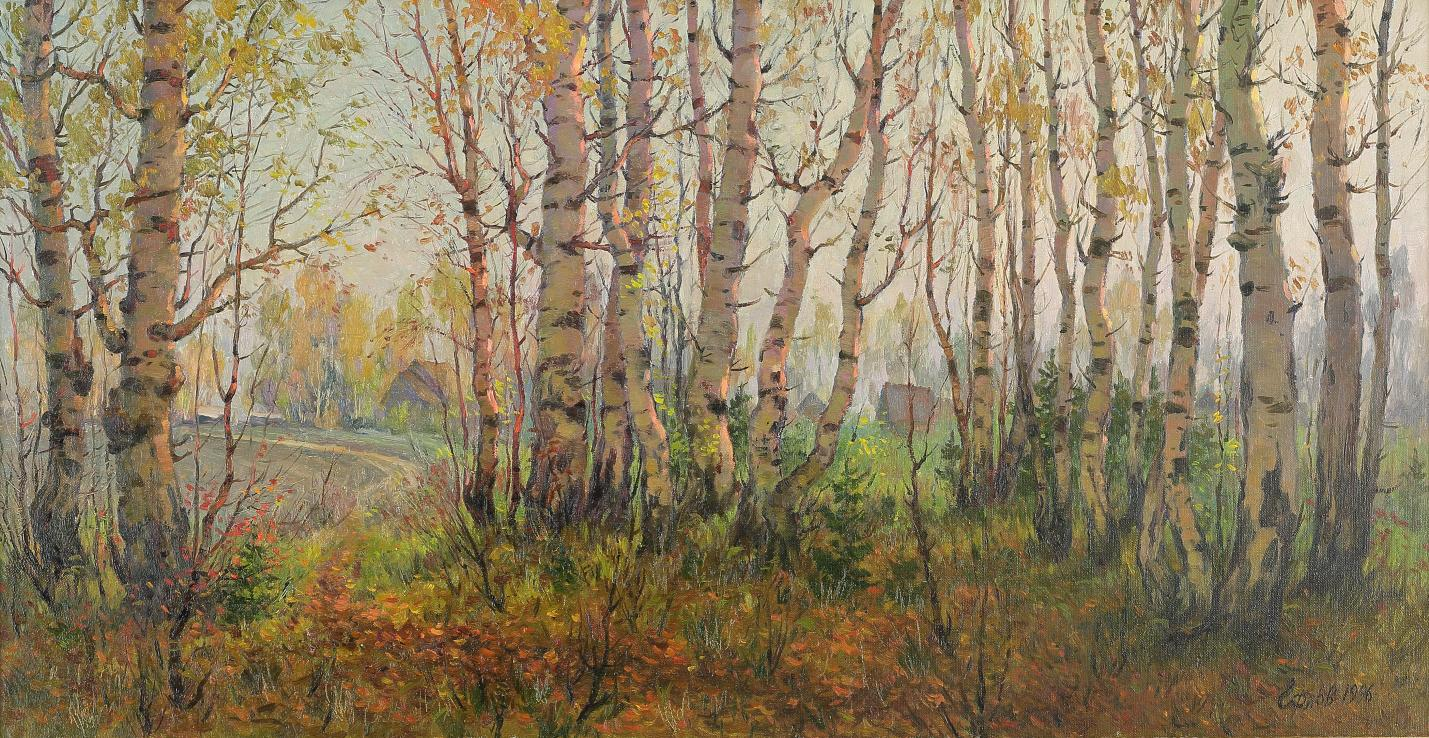
Eternal Symbols of Russia, 1996

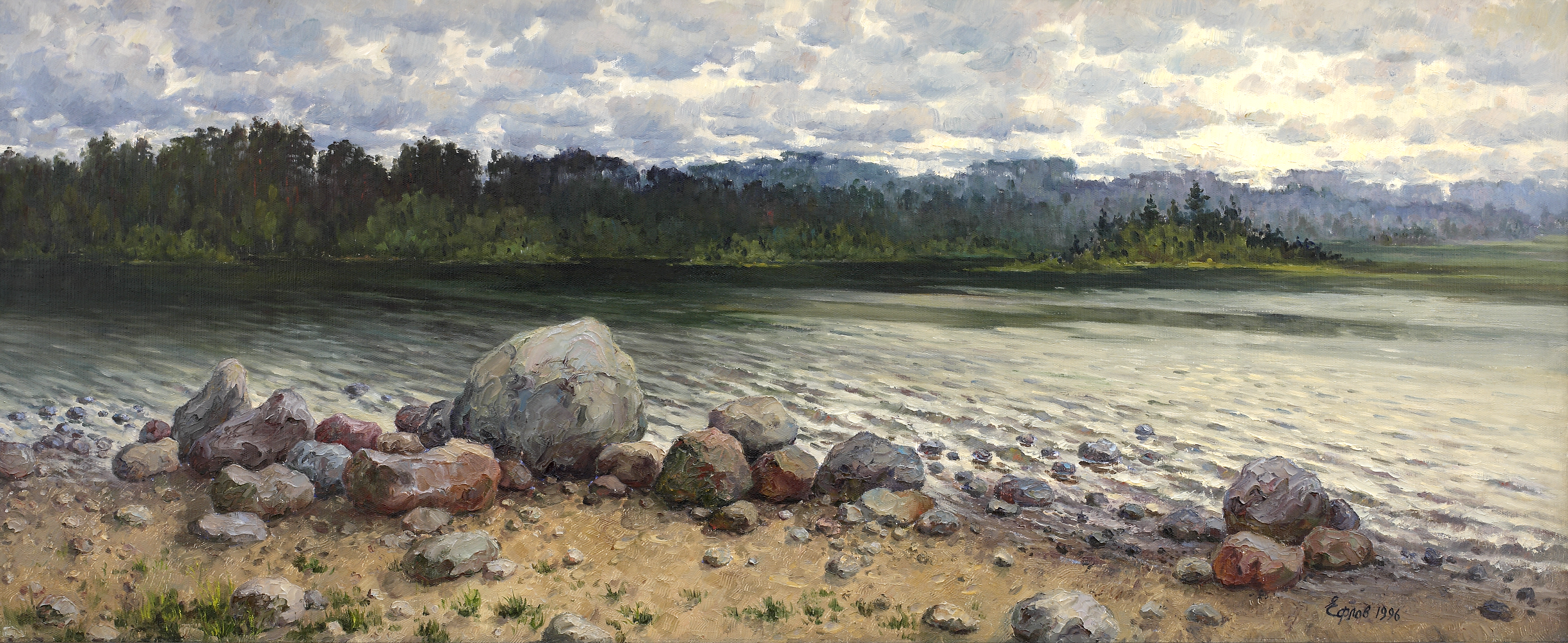
Karelian Stones, 1996

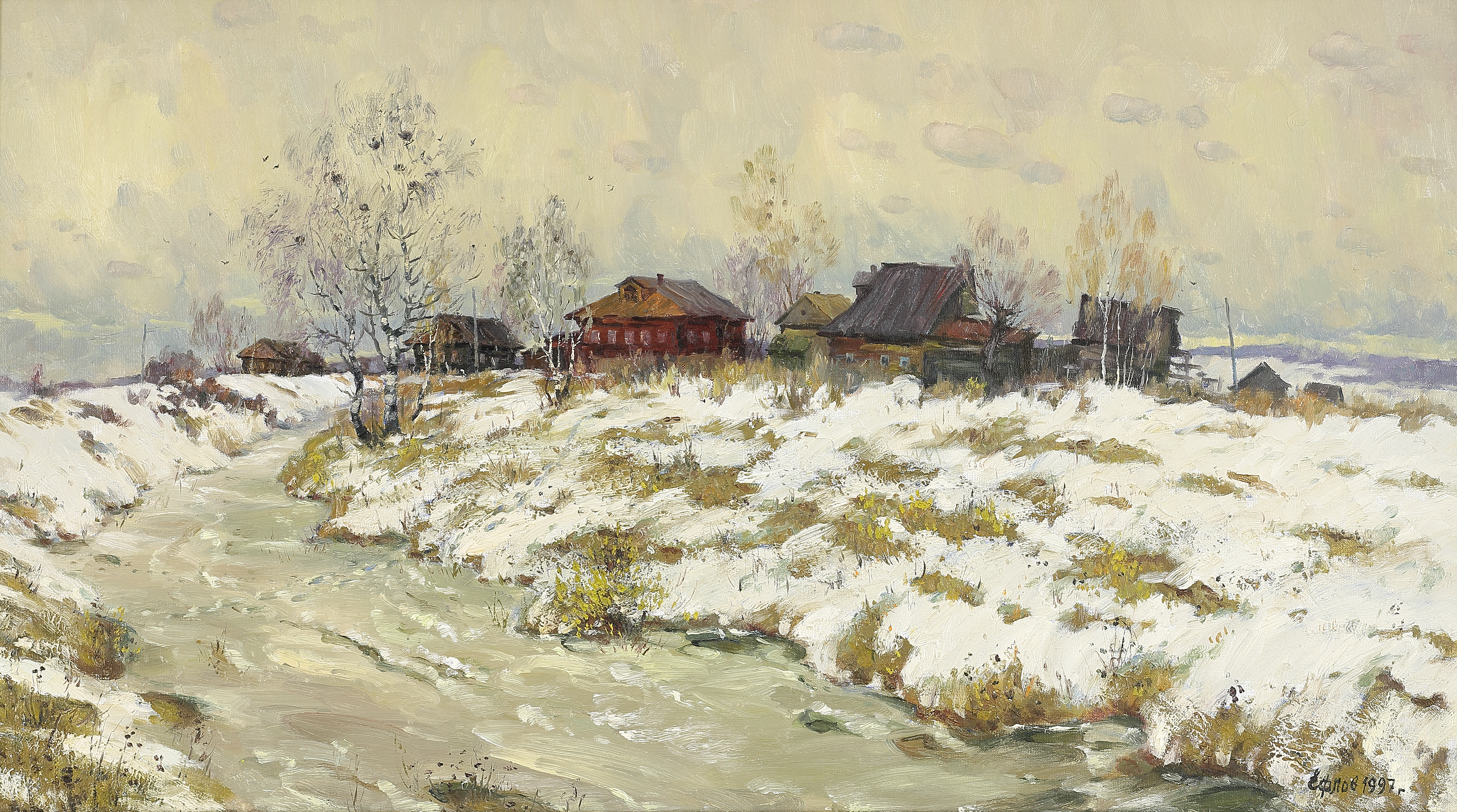
Village Barsky Pogost, 1997

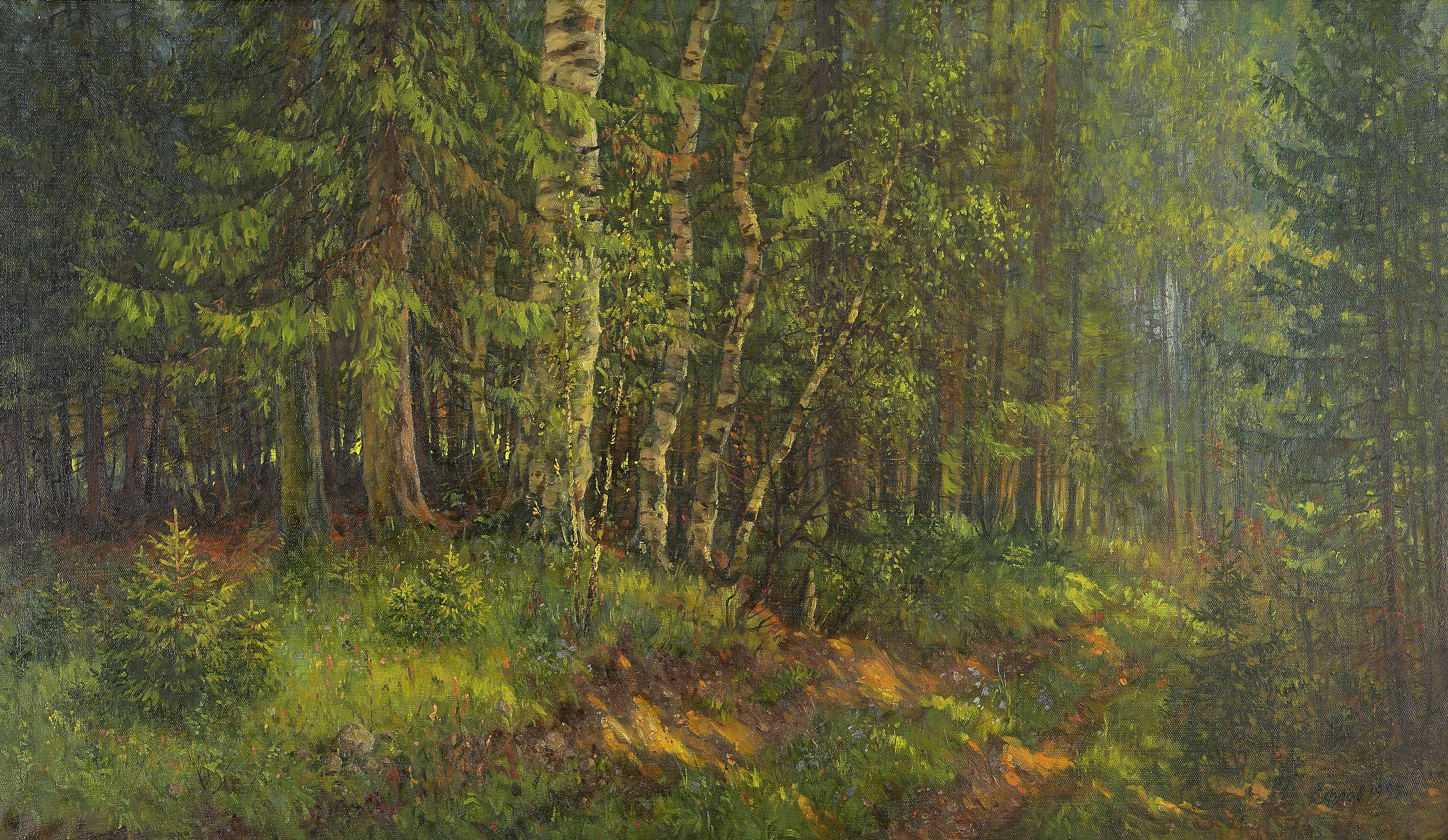
A Forest Road, 1997

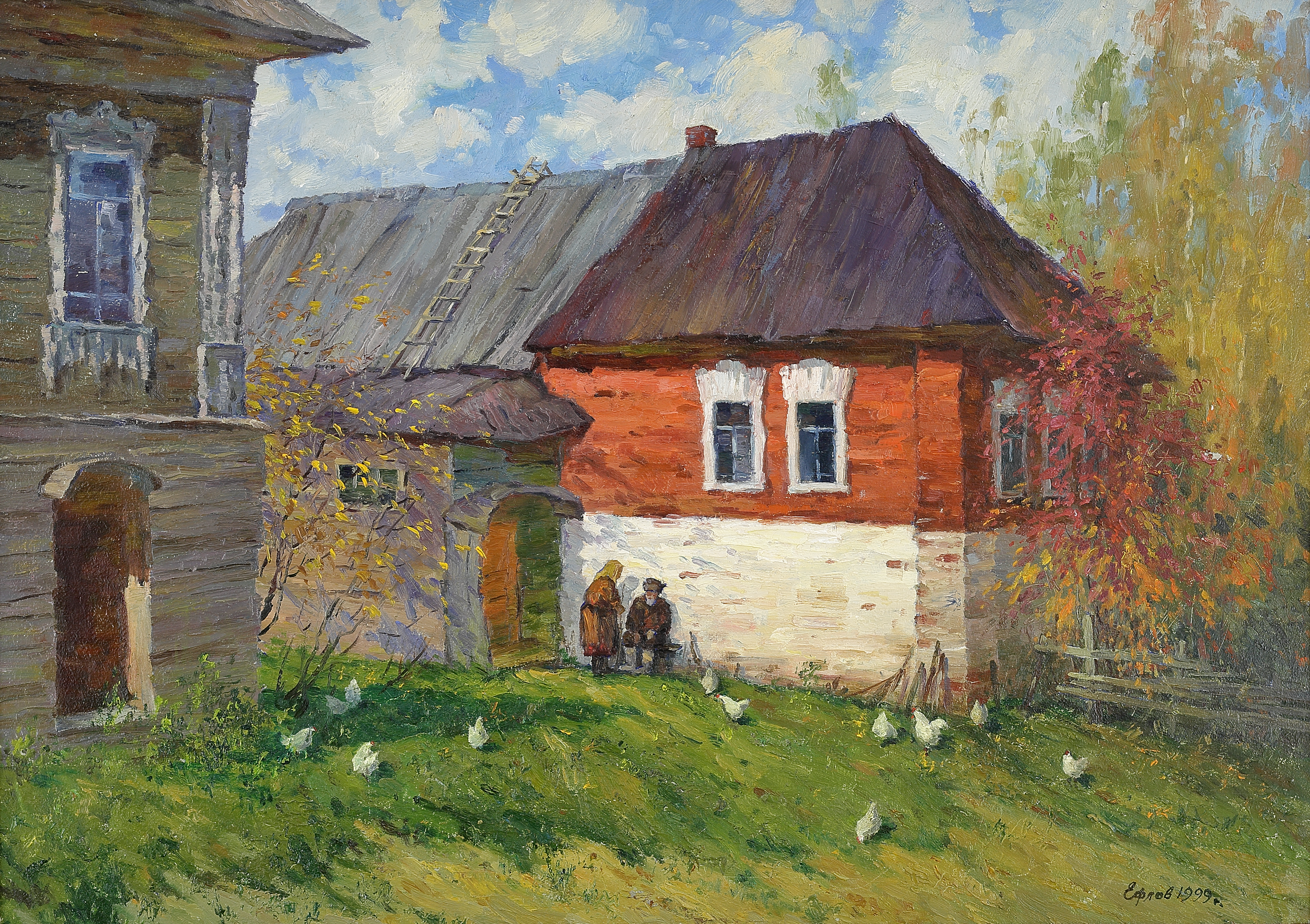
Fading, 1999

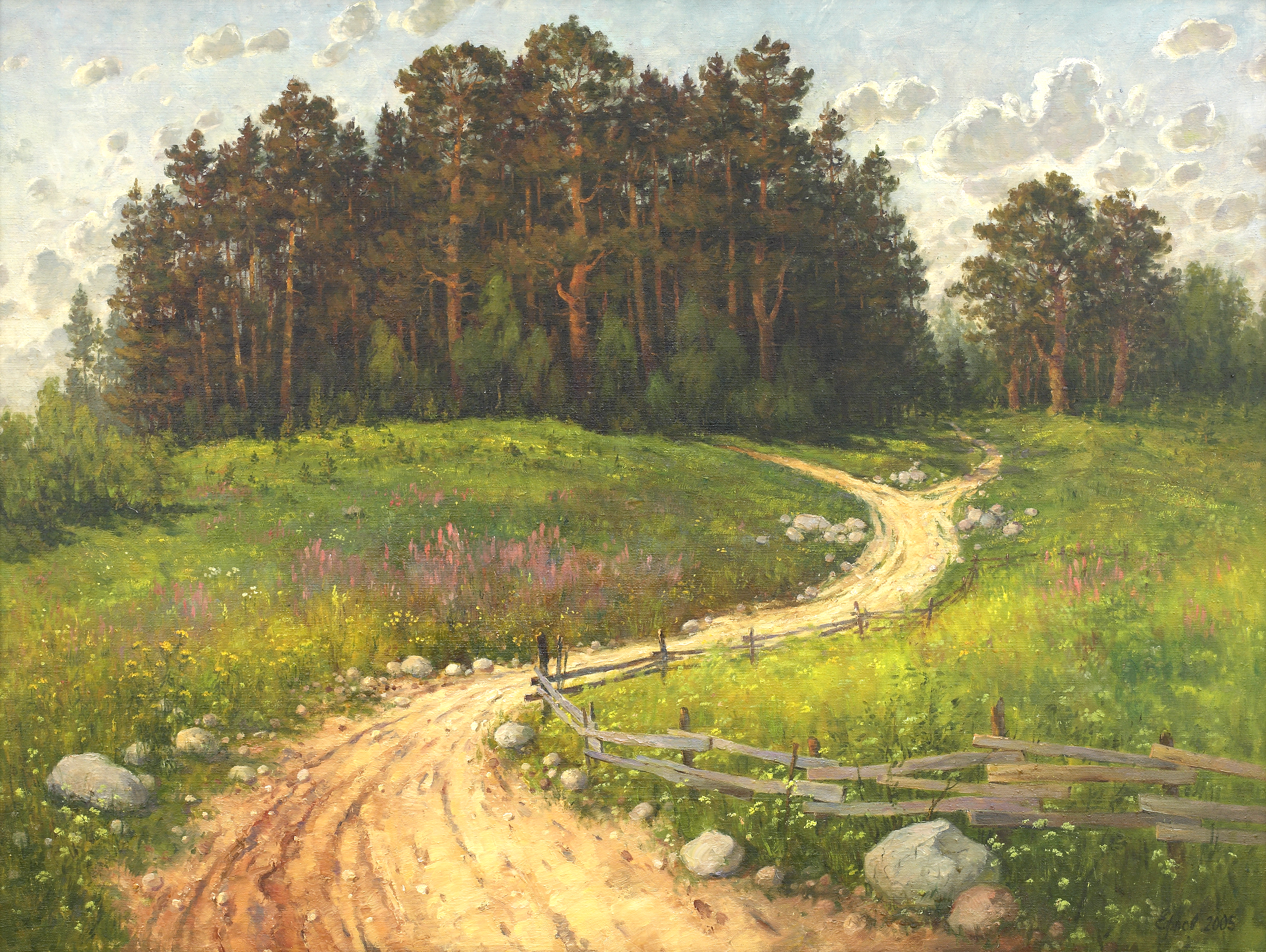
Karelia, 2005

== Exhibitions ==
From 1958 now on Boris Yeflov’s works have been exhibited at dozens of exhibitions. Over recent years, almost all these exhibitions were one-man show. The most significant of them are listed below:

- The art exhibition of Russian painters. Italy. Firm Sytko (1992)
- ‘The Transparent Light of the Water-Colour.’ Kostroma, Perpetuum Art Gallery (2006)
- Anniversary exhibition in honour of the Painter’s eightieth birthday. Kostroma. Romanov Museum (2007)
- ‘Farewell to the Painter.’ Exhibition at the Exhibition Hall in Kostroma City Administration building (2013)
- Exhibition of graphic portraits and drawings. Kostroma Synagogue (2014)
- ‘The Forest Road’. Kostroma Regional Museum of Nature (2016)
- ‘Varvara’s House’. The exhibition dedicated to the Painter’s ninetieth anniversary. Kostroma. Former Nobility Assembly Hall (2017)
- ‘The Magic of the North through the eyes of Boris Yeflov’. Karelia. Sortavala (2017)
- ‘Dance of Reflections’ Museum Kierikkikeskus, Oulu, Finland. (2021)

== Literary sources ==
- Прозрачный свет акварели. Ефлов Борис Александрович. – Кострома: Издательский Дом «Линия График Кострома», 2007. – 34 с.
- Виртуоз пейзажа. Борис Ефлов. Живопись. – Кострома: Издательский Дом «Линия График Кострома», 2007. - 80 с: ил.
- О друзьях-товарищах. Борис Ефлов. – Ярославль: Издательское бюро «Филигрань», 2015. - 44 с.
- Варварин дом Бориса Ефлова. – Кострома: Издательский Дом «Линия График Кострома», 2017. - 56 с: ил.
- Магия севера глазами Бориса Ефлова. – Кострома: Издательский Дом «Линия График Кострома», 2017. - 80 с.: ил.
- Бузин А.И. Художники-фронтовики 1941 – 1945 г. – Кострома: Типография издательства «Северная правда», 1975. – 68 с.
- Художники Костромы. – Кострома: Издание Костромской организации художников, 1994. – 128 с.
- Костромские художники – ветераны войны и труда. – Кострома: Издание Костромской организации художников и администрации Костромской области, 1995. – 296 с.
- Бузин А.И., Касторская Т.М., Туловская Т.И., Неганова Г.Д. Художники земли Костромской. – Кострома: Костромаиздат, 2013. – 376 с.: ил.
- Бузин А.И. Великая Отечественная война в творчестве костромских художников. – Кострома: Костромаиздат. – 2015. – 120 с.
- ХУДОЖНИКИ НАРОДОВ СССР, Библиографический словарь., том. 4, кн. 1, стр. 75, Москва, «Искусство», 1983. – 592 с.
- Arte soviético. Realismo socialista 1945-1980 (Catálogo Exposición Galería Ynguanzo, Octubre-Noviemb). – Romano Canavese: Tipografia Ferrero, 1991. – 19-21 p.
