= Boris Zeisser =

Dutch architect

Boris Zeisser (born 29 April 1968, Alkmaar) is an internationally active Dutch architect, based in Rotterdam.

== Education and career ==
Inspired by multiple visits to Frank Lloyd Wright’s Fallingwater and this type of relation between architecture and nature, Boris Zeisser decided to study and practice architecture. After graduating with an honorable mention from Delft University in 1995, he worked for the Dutch office Erick Van Egeraat Architects (1996-2000). On 1 January 2001 he established 24H>architecture, together with Maartje Lammers. In 2015 he started his new office Natrufied architecture, together with his partner Anja Verdonk.

== Selected works ==
- Dragspelhuset, Sweden, 2001-2004
- Ecological Children Activity and Education Center, Koh-Kood, Thailand, 2006-2007
- Housing for musicians, Hoogvliet, Netherlands, 2007-2010
- Contemplating the Void, Guggenheim Museum, New York, United States, 2010
- Dutch barn, Alkmaar, Netherlands, 2011
- Housing Nieuw Leyden, Leiden, Netherlands, 2009-2011

== Bibliography ==
- Zeisser, Boris; Lammers, Maartje (2007). 24H Architecture: Hot Ice (Neoarchitecture). Mulgrave, Victoria, Australia: Images Publishing Group Pty Ltd. ISBN 978-1-920744-84-7.
