= Kostroma region Museum of Nature =

Natural history museum in Kostroma, Russia

- Музей природы Костромской области
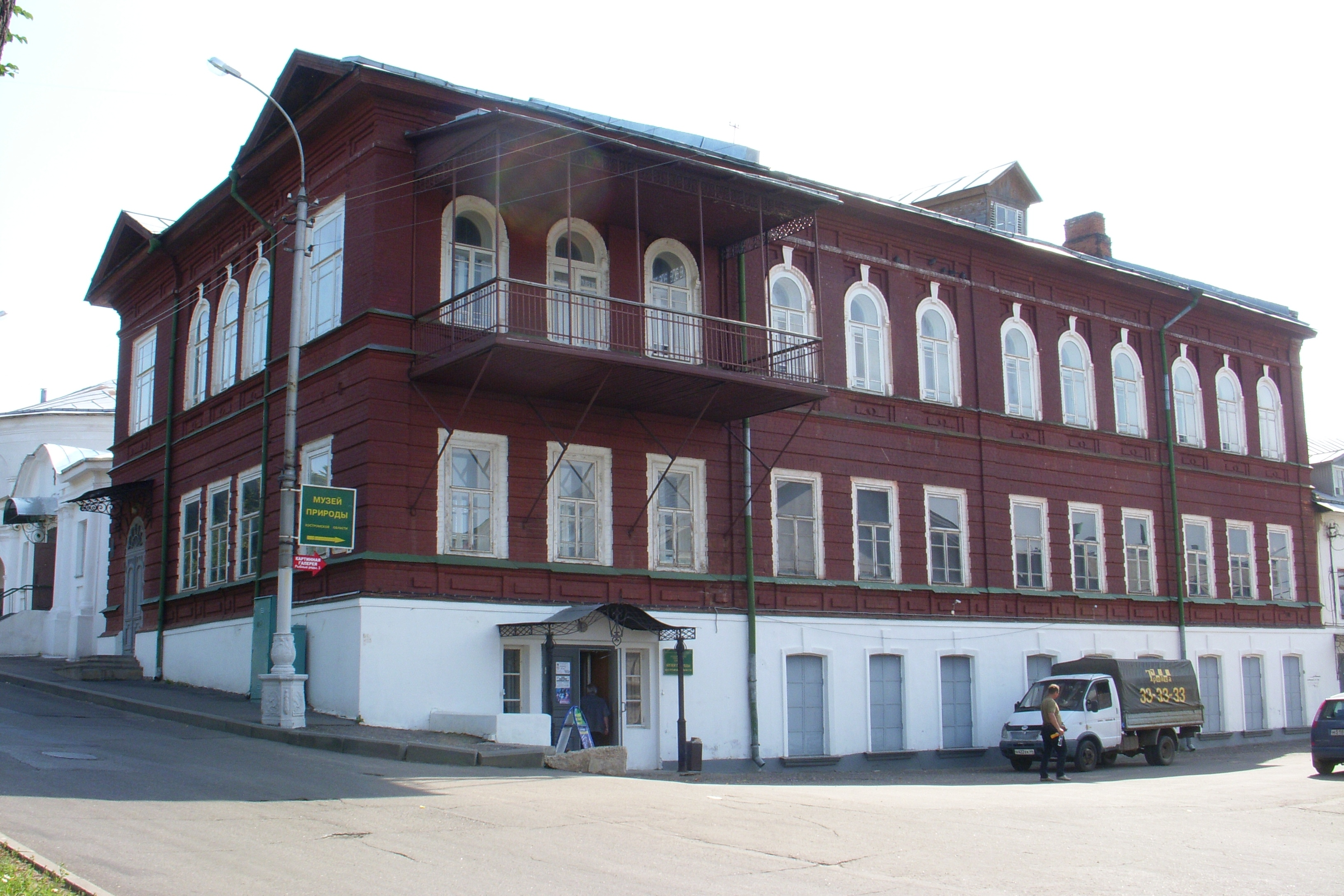
- Established: 1958 (2001)
- Director: Lapshina Alexandra Valeryevna
- Website: https://www.km-priroda.ru/

The Kostroma region Museum of Nature is a natural history museum located in Kostroma, Russia. The museum was founded in 1958 as a department of the Kostroma State Historical and Architectural Museum. The museum's dioramas about the area's animals and plants include the themes "Spring", "Early winter", "Root winter", and a large collection of Russian insects. Other displays include birds and mammals of the Kostroma region, area fish and fossils. The museum's dioramas about the area's animals and plants include the themes "Spring", "Early winter", "Root winter", and a large collection of Russian insects. Other displays include birds and mammals of the Kostroma region, area fish and fossils.

The museum's activities and programs include nature excursions, themed excursions in one of the halls, interactive adult and children's programs, master classes, event days, competitions and educational activities for students.

== History ==
The first director of the museum, Maria Orehova, and the taxidermist, Vladimir Tyak, created the first exhibits of the museum. A number of local artists and hunters were involved in the creation and the development of museum's dioramas. In the early 1960s a fire destroyed the museum's exhibitions "Wolves attack the elk" and "Snowy owl", which were restored in 1964–1965. The famous "Flora and Fauna" exhibition was divided to the 4 seasons. In 1965 the department of nature became the most popular part of the museum and in 1966 it was organized to display Ivan Rubinsky collection of over 4500 insects from the Russian Empire.

The Nature department was transformed in 2001 to the independent Kostroma region Museum of Nature and was transferred to a separate building in the central part of city. Unfortunately, the exhibition was partially broken, and a great number of the exhibits were destroyed.

Since 2001 the museum has existed as an independent museum.
