= Boris Zarkov =

- Борис Константинович Зарьков
- Born: Boris Konstantinovich Zarkov; 22 November 1974 (age 51); Moscow, Russian SFSR, Soviet Union
- Occupations: Restaurateur, businessman
- Known for: Founder of the White Rabbit Family restaurant alliance
- Spouse: Irina Zarkova
- Children: 3 (Luca, Maria, Nina)
- Website: boriszarkov.com

Boris Konstantinovich Zarkov (Russian: Борис Константинович Зарьков; born 22 November 1974) is a Russian restaurateur and entrepreneur, the founder of the White Rabbit Family restaurant alliance. The alliance's projects, most notably its flagship White Rabbit in Moscow, have been listed several times in The World's 50 Best Restaurants, and several of his restaurants have received Michelin Guide stars.

== Early life and education ==
Zarkov was born in Moscow on 22 November 1974. In 1990 he graduated from secondary school No. 1511 attached to the Moscow Engineering Physics Institute (MEPhI), and in the same year entered MEPhI's Faculty of Cybernetics. As a second-year student he started doing business and transferred to the Faculty of Production Management at the Moscow State University of Technology STANKIN, graduating in 1995.

He later completed Executive MBA and Executive Coaching programmes at the Moscow School of Management SKOLKOVO, as well as a course in psychoanalysis and management consulting at the Higher School of Economics.

== Career ==
In the 1990s Zarkov owned a chain of car washes in Moscow. In 2003, in partnership with chef Konstantin Ivlev and Anton Sotnikov, he opened the restaurant-bar Poison, which closed roughly two years later.

In 2006 he opened the karaoke café Bufet, and in 2010 the family restaurant Luciano in Moscow. In 2011 Zarkov, together with co-founder Alexander Zaturinsky, opened White Rabbit in Moscow, which became the flagship of the alliance later named White Rabbit Family.

== White Rabbit Family ==
White Rabbit, opened in Moscow in 2011, is built around contemporary Russian cuisine. Its head chef and the alliance's brand chef is Vladimir Mukhin, who placed ninth in the global Best Chef Awards ranking in 2021. The restaurant has been described as the most internationally celebrated Russian restaurant of the 2010s.

=== Moscow projects ===
The alliance operates more than twenty projects in Moscow, including White Rabbit, Sakhalin, Krasota, Selfie, Gorynych, Tehnikum, the Vokrug Sveta food market (a partnership with restaurateur Arkady Novikov), the wellness bistro SHE (a joint project with Ksenia Sobchak), and the omakase-style restaurants of the WA Garden group.

=== Southern branch ===
In 2013, in preparation for the 2014 Winter Olympics in Sochi, Zarkov set up the alliance's southern branch. Its flagship is the Red Fox restaurant, alongside several other venues in the Sochi area.

=== International projects ===
In 2017 the alliance opened Selfie Astana in Astana, Kazakhstan. In summer 2021 it opened Sakhalin Bodrum in Bodrum, Turkey, followed in February 2023 by Sakhalin Istanbul. In December 2023 the Sakhalin brand entered the Dubai market.

In April 2023 the alliance opened the immersive gastro-theatre Krasota (from Russian for "beauty") at the Address Downtown hotel in Dubai, a 20-seat venue that combines haute cuisine with 360-degree projections, sound and visual storytelling.

In December 2025 the alliance opened a Gorynych restaurant in Tashkent, its first venue in Uzbekistan.

=== Plyos project ===
In June 2021 the seasonal project IKRA opened in Plyos, Ivanovo Oblast, as an 18-seat chef's table with tasting menus drawn from local produce. A second alliance project, Gorynych, later opened in the same town.

=== Franchising ===
In 2023 the alliance launched a franchising programme for its Gorynych and Tehnikum brands, targeting up to 30 openings across Russian regions and CIS countries by 2027.

By April 2026, franchised restaurants had opened in cities including Novosibirsk, Kazan, Rostov-on-Don, Ufa, Krasnaya Polyana and Tyumen.

=== Expansion beyond restaurants ===
In 2025–2026 the alliance expanded into adjacent segments of the hospitality industry. In 2025 it became the hospitality concept partner for the Usadba Demidova residential development by MR Group in Moscow, providing residents with luxury hotel-style services including concierge and private dining.

A wellness complex under the alliance's management is scheduled to open in Moscow in 2026.

== The World's 50 Best Restaurants ==
White Rabbit has been listed multiple times in this annual international ranking, including 25th place in the 2021 edition, 13th place in 2019, and 18th place in 2016. According to The World's 50 Best Restaurants, Zarkov is "widely considered a new type of restaurant CEO," known for forming close partnerships with creative chefs.

== Michelin Guide ==
On 14 October 2021 the first Russian Michelin Guide ceremony was held at Zaryadye Concert Hall in Moscow, as part of the guide's international expansion that year. Three of the alliance's restaurants — White Rabbit, Selfie and Sakhalin — each received one Michelin star, while Mushrooms and Tehnikum received guide recommendations.

== Books ==
In October 2024 Zarkov published the book Management Through the Eyes of a Restaurateur (Russian: Менеджмент глазами ресторатора; Bookwings).

In September 2025, together with strategic brand-management consultant Dmitry Zavrazhnov, he published Brand DNA (Russian: ДНК Бренда; Bookwings), focused on building brands in the hospitality industry.

== Awards and recognition ==
- Russian National Hospitality Award (2016).
- "Restaurateur of the Year" by GQ Russia (2016, 2017, 2018).
- Winner in the "Restaurant Business" category of the Cosmopolitan Man Awards.
- Nominated for the WhereToEat Russia Award in the category of innovative solutions in the Russian restaurant industry.

== Personal life ==
Zarkov is married to Irina Zarkova, who serves as Director of Communications and Public Relations of White Rabbit Family. The couple have three children: Luca, Maria and Nina.
