= Boris Yakovenko =

Russian philosopher

Boris Valentinovich Yakovenko (4 June [O.S. 23 May] 1884 – 16 January 1949) was a Russian philosopher. As one of the more prominent Russian neo-Kantians, much of Yakavenko's work focused on problems of cognition.

== Biography ==
Boris Valentinovich Yakovenko was born in Tver on 4 June [O.S. 23 May] 1884. He graduated from a classical gymnasium in Saint Petersburg in 1903 and that same year was admitted to Imperial Moscow University. In 1905, he participated in the Russian Revolution of 1905, for which he was arrested and imprisoned. Following his release, Yakovenko fled Russia to continue his studies at Heidelberg University in Germany.

In 1910, he co-established a Russian philosophical journal called Logos, while working on Russian translations of philosophical works such as those of Johann Gottlieb Fichte and Benedetto Croce. From 1913 he resided in Italy, and later moved to Prague, where he worked to interpret and critique the works of various European philosophers. Much of Yakovenko's work was dedicated to existing philosophies, and works that reveal his own views remain somewhat obscure. He was one of the more prominent Russian neo-Kantians, of the Baden School, a follower of Hermann Cohen, and had a particular focus on problems of cognition. Yakovenko died in Prague on 16 January 1949.
