= Boris Zubarev =

Russian physicist (1875–1952)

Boris Innokentievich Zubarev
- Born: Boris Innokentievich Zubarev; Зубарев Борис Иннокентьевич; 20 April 1875; Saint Petersburg
- Died: 15 June 1952 (aged 77); Perm
- Occupation: physicist

Boris Innokentievich Zubarev (Russian: Зубарев Борис Иннокентьевич; 20 April 1875, in Saint Petersburg – 15 July 1952, in Perm) was a Russian physicist. Professor, Doctor of Physical and Mathematical Sciences.

== Biography ==
Boris Innokentievich Zubarev was born on 20 April 1875 in St. Petersburg.

In 1901 he graduated from the Physics and Mathematics Faculty of St. Petersburg University, majoring in physics. His scientific guide were professor Vladimir Lermantov and professor Ivan Borgman. In 1901, Zubarev was invited by the inventor of the radio Alexander Popov to assume the position of senior laboratory assistant at the Saint Petersburg Electrotechnical Institute, where he took part in organization of a physical laboratory. Zubarev worked under the leadership of Popov until death of the latter in 1905. He taught at the Electrotechnical Institute until the end of 1923. At the same time he was a professor at Petrograd Pedagogical Institute.

In 1923, Zubarev was elected professor at the Department of Physics of the Far Eastern University, where he worked until 1930. There he was in charge of the department and read a course of lectures about experimental and theoretical physics. Since 1930, Zubarev was an associate professor at the Leningrad University and, at the same time, eas a senior research fellow at the State Optical Institute and as well as a lecturer at Leningrad Shipbuilding Institute. In 1935—1936 he was a professor at Rostov State University and Novocherkassk Industrial Institute.

In August 1937 Boris Innokentievich Zubarev was invited to Perm University to read the course of physics and was appointed head of the Department of General Physics. However, already in 1939 he was removed from the position of head of the department.

For more than 50 years of work in different universities in Russia and the USSR, Zubarev was engaged not only in pedagogical, but also in research activity. Simultaneously with German physicist Arthur Wehnelt he built an electrolytic interrupter; he also investigated the polarization of light upon reflection from metals; determined the optical constants of metallic crystals; he was first in Russia (together with Mitrofan Glagolev) to get an X-ray diffraction pattern from crystals according to the Laue method; he determined the thermoelectric power of the graphite-coal pair.

Zubarev died on 15 July 1952 in Perm and was buried at Yegoshikha Cemetery.
