= FC Khimik Semiluki =

- Full name: Football Club Khimik Semiluki

FC Khimik Semiluki (Russian: «Химик» Семилуки) was a Russian football team from Semiluki. It played professionally in 1989 in the Soviet Second League and in 1990 in the Soviet Second League B.
