= 2025 Kostroma Oblast gubernatorial election =

- 12–14 September 2025
- Turnout: 39.76% ▲7.82 pp
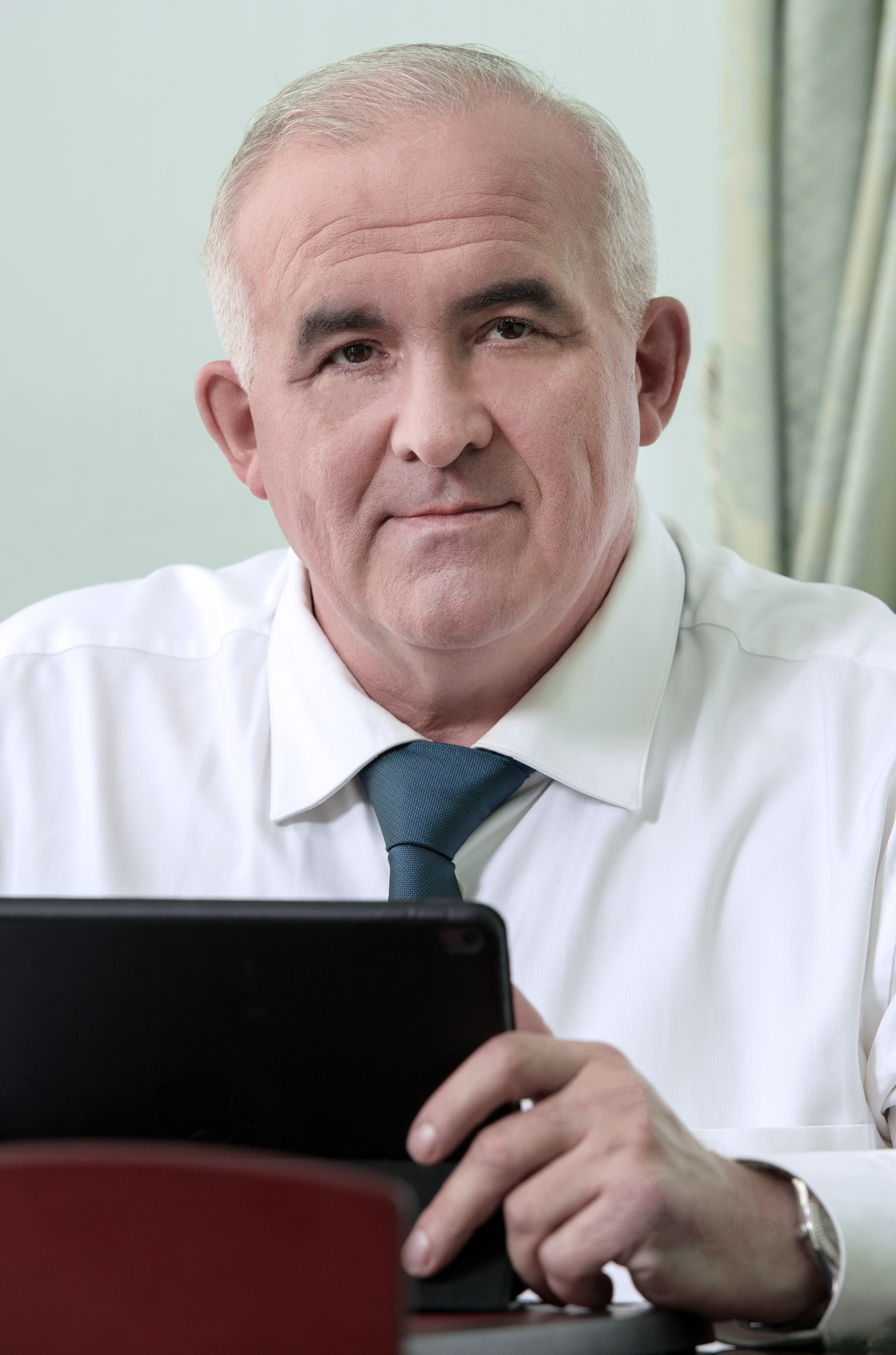
		CPRF	SR–ZP
Candidate	Sergey Sitnikov	Sergey Shpotin	Nikolay Tsvil
Party	United Russia	CPRF	SR–ZP
Popular vote	133,535	21,817	12,972
Percentage	67.63%	11.05%	6.57%
	RPPSS	LDPR
Candidate	Yury Kudryavtsev	Yury Mindolin
Party	Party of Pensioners	LDPR
Popular vote	12,486	12,133
Percentage	6.32%	6.15%
Governor before election
Sergey Sitnikov
United Russia
Governor-elect
Sergey Sitnikov
United Russia

The 2025 Kostroma Oblast gubernatorial election took place on 12–14 September 2025, on common election day, coinciding with 2025 Kostroma Oblast legislative election. Incumbent Governor of Kostroma Oblast Sergey Sitnikov was re-elected to a fourth term in office.

== Background ==
Then-Roskomnadzor head Sergey Sitnikov was appointed acting Governor of Kostroma Oblast in April 2012, replacing highly unpopular first-term incumbent Igor Slyunyayev. Sitnikov was unanimously confirmed as Governor of Kostroma Oblast by Kostroma Oblast Duma two weeks later. Sitnikov triggered an early gubernatorial election in 2015 and ran for a second term as United Russia candidate despite being officially an independent. Governor Sitnikov won the election with 65.62% of the vote. In 2020 Sitnikov ran for a third term as United Russia candidate and won re-election with 64.65% of the vote.

Initially Governor of Kostroma Oblast was limited for just two consecutive terms so Sitnikov would have been term-limited in 2025 (his 2012–2015 term was reset). However, in December 2021 "On Common Principles of Organisation of Public Authority in the Subjects of the Russian Federation" law was enacted, which lifted term limits for Russian governors. Kostroma Oblast followed suit and lifted the restrictions, which allowed Sitnikov to seek another term in 2025.

Sitnikov was viewed as a potential candidate for replacement as governor prior to the 2025 election. Several reasons were named for Sitnikov's potential resignation, including his long tenure in office, lack of significant achievements and low support from federal elites. Deputy Chairman of the State Duma Vladislav Davankov was viewed as potential replacement for Sitnikov, however, reports in February 2025 stated that Sitnikov is likely to seek a fourth term in office due to lack of major failures of his administration.

In March 2025 during a meeting with President Vladimir Putin Governor Sitnikov announced his intention to run for a fourth term and received Putin's endorsement.

== Candidates ==
In Kostroma Oblast candidates for Governor of Kostroma Oblast can be nominated only by registered political parties. Candidate for Governor of Kostroma Oblast should be a Russian citizen and at least 30 years old. Candidates for Governor of Kostroma Oblast should not have a foreign citizenship or residence permit. Each candidate in order to be registered is required to collect at least 8% of signatures of members and heads of municipalities. Also gubernatorial candidates present 3 candidacies to the Federation Council and election winner later appoints one of the presented candidates.

=== Declared ===
Candidate name, political party		Occupation	Status	Ref.
Yury Kudryavtsev; Party of Pensioners		Deputy Director of Department of Culture of Kostroma Oblast; Former Member of Kostroma Oblast Duma (2005–2020); 2015 LDPR gubernatorial candidate	Registered	
Yury Mindolin; Liberal Democratic Party		Member of Duma of Volgorechensk (2010–present)	Registered	
Sergey Shpotin; Communist Party		Party regional committee secretary	Registered	
Sergey Sitnikov; United Russia	Sergey Sitnikov	Incumbent Governor of Kostroma Oblast (2012–present)	Registered	
Nikolay Tsvil; SR–ZP		Member of Kostroma Oblast Duma (2020–present)	Registered	

=== Declined ===
- Ruslan Fedorov (LDPR), Member of Kostroma Oblast Duma (2020–present), 2020 gubernatorial candidate
- Valery Gromov (RPPSS), pensioner
- Valery Izhitsky (CPRF), former Member of Kostroma Oblast Duma (1994–2020), former Chairman of the Oblast Duma (2000–2005), 2015 and 2020 gubernatorial candidate
- Aleksandr Lazutin (Yabloko), former Member of Kostroma Oblast Duma (2005–2010), farmer, 2020 gubernatorial candidate
- Vladimir Mikhaylov (PSZ), Member of Kostroma Oblast Duma (2004–present), leader of Party of Social Justice (2019–present), 2018 Independent presidential candidate, 2024 presidential candidate
- Yelena Poteshkina (New People), Member of Kostroma Oblast Duma (2020–present)
- Yury Shestakov (RPPSS), Member of Kostroma Oblast Duma (2023–present)

=== Candidates for Federation Council ===
Head candidate, political party	Candidates for Federation Council	Status
Yury Kudryavtsev; Party of Pensioners	* Anton Gromov, individual entrepreneur * Yury Shestakov, Member of Kostroma Oblast Duma (2023–present) * Lyubov Zimovets, retired prison guard	Registered
Yury Mindolin; LDPR	* Aleksey Berdyshev, Member of Serednyakovskoye Rural Settlement Council of Deputies (2021–present) * Ruslan Fedorov, Member of Kostroma Oblast Duma (2020–present), 2020 gubernatorial candidate * Natalya Kalembrik, aide to State Duma member Vladimir Sipyagin	Registered
Sergey Shpotin; Communist Party	* Valery Izhitsky, former Member of Kostroma Oblast Duma (1994–2020), former Chairman of the Oblast Duma (2000–2005), 2015 and 2020 gubernatorial candidate * Ivan Saburov, former Member of Duma of Kostroma (2015–2020) * Leonid Serov, businessman	Registered
Sergey Sitnikov; United Russia	* Aleksey Isakov, Deputy Chairman of the Kostroma Oblast Duma (2022–present), Member of the Oblast Duma (2015–present), Gazprom executive * Natalya Pashkanova, Member of Duma of Kostroma (2015–present), school principal * Nikolai Zhuravlev, Deputy Chairman of the Federation Council (2019–present), incumbent Senator (2011–present)	Registered
Nikolay Tsvil; SR–ZP	* Maksim Kirillov, businessman * Yury Loginov, former Member of Baksheyevskoye Rural Settlement Council of Deputies (2016–2021) * Darya Ushakova, aide to Kostroma Oblast Duma member	Registered

== Finances ==
All sums are in rubles.

Financial Report	Source	Kudryavtsev	Mindolin	Shpotin	Sitnikov	Tsvil
First		0	230,000	300,000	150,000	10,000
Final		8,820,000	399,710	1,310,000	65,850,000	152,440

== Polls ==
Fieldwork date	Polling firm	Sitnikov	Shpotin	Tsvil	Kudryavtsev	Mindolin	None	Lead
14 September 2025	2025 election	67.6	11.1	6.6	6.3	6.2	2.3	56.5
5–19 August 2025	WCIOM	69.3	11.4	5.4	5.1	5.7	3.1	57.9

== Results ==
Summary of the 12–14 September 2025 Kostroma Oblast gubernatorial election results
Candidate	Party	Votes	%
Sergey Sitnikov (incumbent)	United Russia	133,535	67.63
Sergey Shpotin	Communist Party	21,817	11.05
Nikolay Tsvil	A Just Russia – For Truth	12,972	6.57
Yury Kudryavtsev	Party of Pensioners	12,486	6.32
Yury Mindolin	Liberal Democratic Party	12,133	6.15
Valid votes		192,943	97.72
Blank ballots		4,502	2.28
Total		197,445	100.00
Turnout		197,445	39.76
Registered voters		496,579	100.00

Governor Sitnikov re-appointed incumbent Senator Nikolai Zhuravlev (United Russia) to the Federation Council.

== See also ==
- 2025 Russian regional elections
