= 2025 Kostroma Oblast legislative election =

Regional legislative election in Russia

← 2020	12–14 September 2025	2030 →

All 35 seats in the Oblast Duma 18 seats needed for a majority
- Turnout: 39.72% ▲7.75 pp
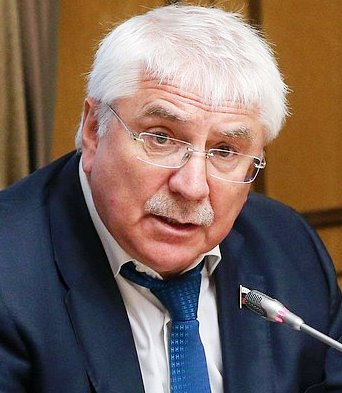
	Majority party	Minority party	Third party
	UR	LDPR	CPRF
Candidate	Aleksey Anokhin	Ruslan Fedorov	Valery Izhitsky
Party	United Russia	LDPR	CPRF
Last election	31.92%, 24 seats	12.11%, 1 seat	17.23%, 2 seats
Seats won	26	2	2
Seat change	▲2	▲1	Steady
Popular vote	99,097	23,887	22,208
Percentage	50.26%	12.12%	11.26%
Swing	▲18.34 pp	▲0.01 pp	▼5.97 pp
	Fourth party	Fifth party	Sixth party
	RPPSS	NL
Candidate	Yury Shestakov	Maria Bazhenova	Alexey Chepa
Party	Party of Pensioners	New People	SR–ZP
Last election	8.34%, 1 seat	7.46%, 1 seat	9.16%, 2 seats
Seats won	1	1	3
Seat change	Steady	Steady	▲1
Popular vote	14,286	13,469	12,082
Percentage	7.25%	6.83%	6.13%
Swing	▼1.09 pp	▼0.63 pp	▼3.03 pp
Chairman before election
Aleksey Anokhin
United Russia
Elected Chairman
Aleksey Anokhin
United Russia

The 2025 Kostroma Oblast Duma election took place on 12–14 September 2025, on common election day, coinciding with 2025 Kostroma Oblast gubernatorial election. All 35 seats in the Oblast Duma were up for re-election.

United Russia increased its already overwhelming majority in the Legislative Assembly, winning 50.3% of the vote and 21 of 25 single-mandate constituencies. Liberal Democratic Party of Russia came in second, doubling its faction to two deputies. Communist Party of the Russian Federation and A Just Russia – For Truth saw their vote share decreasing by roughly a third, however, CPRF retained its two-member faction, while SR–ZP even gained one more seat in a single-member constituency.

== Electoral system ==
Under current election laws, the Oblast Duma is elected for a term of five years, with parallel voting. 10 seats are elected by party-list proportional representation with a 5% electoral threshold, with the other half elected in 25 single-member constituencies by first-past-the-post voting. Seats in the proportional part are allocated using the Imperiali quota, modified to ensure that every party list, which passes the threshold, receives at least one mandate.

== Candidates ==
=== Party lists ===
To register regional lists of candidates, parties need to collect 0.5% of signatures of all registered voters in Kostroma Oblast.

The following parties were relieved from the necessity to collect signatures:

- United Russia
- Communist Party of the Russian Federation
- Liberal Democratic Party of Russia
- A Just Russia — Patriots — For Truth
- New People
- Russian Party of Pensioners for Social Justice
- Communists of Russia

№	Party	Territorial groups leaders	Candidates	Territorial groups	Status
1	United Russia	Nikolay Kopytov • Svetlana Kirillova • Aleksey Anokhin • Mikhail Dushin • Vladimir Unguryan	25	5	Registered
2	Liberal Democratic Party	Vyacheslav Matokhin • Irina Ponomareva • Yury Mindolin • Natalya Kalembrik • Ruslan Fedorov	20	5	Registered
3	Communists of Russia	Ilya Kleymyonov • Sergey Malinkovich • ~~Yaroslav Sidorov~~ • Ruslan Khugayev • Ilya Aleksandrov	22	5	Registered
4	Communist Party	Aleksandr Kiselev • Sergey Shpotin • Olga Panova • Sergey Rassechkin • Valery Izhitsky	21	5	Registered
5	New People	Pavel Zayfidi • Maria Bazhenova • Aleksandr Vlas • Igor Prudnikov • Ivan Kucheryavy	25	5	Registered
6	Party of Pensioners	Anton Gromov • Sergey Kamilatov • Yury Kudryavtsev • Dmitry Shestakov • Yury Shestakov	22	5	Registered
7	A Just Russia – For Truth	Alexey Chepa • Daniil Potekhin • Olga Zinovyeva • Nikolay Tsvil • Vyacheslav Golovnikov	22	5	Registered
~~8~~	Party of Social Protection	Maksim Postnikov • Vladimir Mikhaylov • Yelena Gribova • Valery Pleshevich • Viktor Perov	20	5	Failed to qualify
	Rodina	Dmitry Serov • Vladislav Rozov • Yury Sharanov • Vladimir Kukharenko • Yelena Savitskaya	15	5	Did not file

Yabloko, which participated in the last election, did not file, while For Truth has been dissolved since.

Party of Social Protection, led by Kostroma Oblast Duma member and businessman Vladimir Mikhaylov, was initially denied document filing by the Electoral Commission of Kostroma Oblast due to irregularities at the party conference. The party was able to hold another conference and file the documents again four days later, however, this time the party failed to qualify after the electoral commission ruled the party had United Russia members as conference participants. On August 5 Kostroma Oblast Court ruled in favour of the party and obliged the electoral commission to register Party of Social Protection list but party candidates in single-mandate constituencies were not reinstated. On September 9, First Appellate Court overturned the Kostroma Oblast Court's ruling on party reinstatement and the same day Kostroma Oblast Court ordered to remove Party of Social Protection from the ballot. During the 2020 election the party was also removed from the ballot after initial registration.

=== Single-mandate constituencies ===
25 single-mandate constituencies were formed in Kostroma Oblast. To register candidates in single-mandate constituencies need to collect 3% of signatures of registered voters in the constituency.

Number of candidates in single-mandate constituencies
Party	Candidates	
Party	Nominated	Registered
United Russia	25	24
Communist Party	25	24
Liberal Democratic Party	24	24
A Just Russia – For Truth	21	20
Party of Pensioners	19	19
New People	22	21
Rodina	1	0
Party of Social Protection	2	0
Total	139	132

== Polls ==
Fieldwork date	Polling firm	UR	LDPR	CPRF	RPPSS	NL	SR-ZP	CPCR
14 September 2025	2025 election	50.3	12.1	11.3	7.3	6.8	6.1	3.6
23–24 August 2025	Russian Field	44.2	16.0	15.2	7.5	8.4	6.3	1.2
13 September 2020	2020 election	31.9	12.1	17.2	8.3	7.5	9.2	3.0

== Results ==
=== Results by party lists ===
Summary of the 12–14 September 2025 Kostroma Oblast Duma election results
Party	Party list					Constituency		Total	
Party	Votes	%	±pp	Seats	+/–	Seats	+/–	Seats	+/–
United Russia	99,097	50.26	▲18.34	5	Steady	21	▲2	26	▲2
Liberal Democratic Party	23,887	12.12	▲0.01	1	Steady	1	▲1	2	▲1
Communist Party	22,208	11.26	▼5.97	1	Steady	1	Steady	2	Steady
Party of Pensioners	14,286	7.25	▼1.09	1	Steady	0	Steady	1	Steady
New People	13,469	6.83	▼0.63	1	Steady	0	Steady	1	Steady
A Just Russia — For Truth	12,082	6.13	▼3.03	1	Steady	2	▲1	3	▲1
Communists of Russia	7,028	3.56	▲0.55	0	Steady	–	–	0	Steady
Invalid ballots	5,101	2.59	▼3.15	—	—	—	—	—	—
Total	197,158	100.00	—	10	Steady	25	Steady	35	Steady
Turnout	197,158	39.72	▲7.75	—	—	—	—	—	—
Registered voters	496,354	100.00	—	—	—	—	—	—	—

Aleksey Anokhin (United Russia) was re-elected as Chairman of the Oblast Duma, while Svetlana Kirillova (Independent/United Russia), widow of general Igor Kirillov, was appointed to the Federation Council, replacing retiring incumbent Senator Sergey Kalashnik (United Russia).

=== Results in single-member constituencies ===
==== District 1 ====
Summary of the 12–14 September 2025 Kostroma Oblast Duma election in District 1
Candidate	Party	Votes	%
Ilya Nevsky (incumbent)	United Russia	2,438	43.07%
Vyacheslav Vlasov	New People	671	11.85%
Maria Pasechnik	Communist Party	658	11.62%
Yelena Levina	A Just Russia – For Truth	635	11.22%
Anna Gorchagova	Liberal Democratic Party	499	8.81%
Sergey Smirnov	Party of Pensioners	494	8.73%
Total		5,661	100%

==== District 2 ====
Summary of the 12–14 September 2025 Kostroma Oblast Duma election in District 2
Candidate	Party	Votes	%
Sergey Demenkov (incumbent)	United Russia	2,592	46.55%
Ivan Saburov	Communist Party	1,247	22.40%
Vyacheslav Matokhin	Liberal Democratic Party	514	9.23%
Sergey Malkov	Party of Pensioners	487	8.75%
Aleksandr Vlas	New People	455	8.17%
Total		5,568	100%

==== District 3 ====
Summary of the 12–14 September 2025 Kostroma Oblast Duma election in District 3
Candidate	Party	Votes	%
Vladimir Khramov (incumbent)	United Russia	2,496	46.83%
Nikolay Smirnov	A Just Russia – For Truth	784	14.71%
Aleksandr Kiselev	Communist Party	636	11.93%
Lyubov Zimovets	Party of Pensioners	592	11.11%
Anastasia Kopyonkina	Liberal Democratic Party	566	10.62%
Total		5,330	100%

==== District 4 ====
Summary of the 12–14 September 2025 Kostroma Oblast Duma election in District 4
Candidate	Party	Votes	%
Yevgeny Maslennikov	United Russia	2,342	37.39%
Aleksandr Vasilyev	Liberal Democratic Party	1,162	18.55%
Vladimir Rassadin	New People	864	13.80%
Ilya Smirnov	Communist Party	643	10.27%
Denis Gomzelev	A Just Russia – For Truth	513	8.19%
Aleksandr Tretyakov	Party of Pensioners	403	6.43%
Total		6,263	100%

==== District 5 ====
Summary of the 12–14 September 2025 Kostroma Oblast Duma election in District 5
Candidate	Party	Votes	%
Vladimir Komissarov	United Russia	2,056	37.08%
Leonid Serov	Communist Party	811	14.63%
Darya Sokolova	New People	707	12.75%
Vladimir Vinogradov	A Just Russia – For Truth	690	12.44%
Aleksey Potanin	Party of Pensioners	541	9.76%
Ksenia Ryzhova	Liberal Democratic Party	475	8.57%
Total		5,545	100%

==== District 6 ====
Summary of the 12–14 September 2025 Kostroma Oblast Duma election in District 6
Candidate	Party	Votes	%
Anna Fedorenko	United Russia	2,208	36.95%
Yevgeny Golovin	Liberal Democratic Party	1,133	18.96%
Vladimir Gilyov	Party of Pensioners	803	13.44%
Irina Shishkina	New People	711	11.90%
Dmitry Plaksin	Communist Party	620	10.38%
Total		5,975	100%

==== District 7 ====
Summary of the 12–14 September 2025 Kostroma Oblast Duma election in District 7
Candidate	Party	Votes	%
Vadim Slyusarenko	United Russia	2,825	50.53%
Lyudmila Yeremeyeva	Liberal Democratic Party	705	12.61%
Aleksandr Ivanovsky	Communist Party	636	11.38%
Anastasia Tikhonovich	Party of Pensioners	412	7.37%
Polina Aleynik	A Just Russia – For Truth	409	7.32%
Talgat Malekhonov	New People	284	5.08%
Total		5,591	100%

==== District 8 ====
Summary of the 12–14 September 2025 Kostroma Oblast Duma election in District 8
Candidate	Party	Votes	%
Sergey Galichev (incumbent)	United Russia	2,380	50.06%
Sergey Shpotin	Communist Party	816	17.16%
Nikolay Fomin	A Just Russia – For Truth	686	14.43%
Yelizaveta Lonskaya	Liberal Democratic Party	595	12.52%
Total		4,754	100%

==== District 9 ====
Summary of the 12–14 September 2025 Kostroma Oblast Duma election in District 9
Candidate	Party	Votes	%
Vadim Kozyrev (incumbent)	United Russia	2,599	40.22%
Dmitry Kuzmin	Communist Party	1,846	28.57%
Maria Bazhenova	New People	524	8.11%
Aleksandr Bespalov	A Just Russia – For Truth	467	7.23%
Irina Dubova	Liberal Democratic Party	467	7.23%
Darya Kruglikova	Party of Pensioners	310	4.80%
Total		6,462	100%

==== District 10 ====
Summary of the 12–14 September 2025 Kostroma Oblast Duma election in District 10
Candidate	Party	Votes	%
Nadezhda Shcherbakova	United Russia	2,788	47.02%
Andrey Tarasov	Communist Party	831	14.02%
Olga Smirnova	A Just Russia – For Truth	581	9.80%
Pavel Zayfidi	New People	546	9.21%
Irina Ponomareva	Liberal Democratic Party	453	7.64%
Diana Bykova	Party of Pensioners	369	6.22%
Total		5,929	100%

==== District 11 ====
Summary of the 12–14 September 2025 Kostroma Oblast Duma election in District 11
Candidate	Party	Votes	%
Ivan Bryukhanov (incumbent)	United Russia	3,438	52.14%
Andrey Verichev	Communist Party	742	11.25%
Yevgeny Korablev	Liberal Democratic Party	713	10.81%
Valentina Ivanova	Party of Pensioners	665	10.08%
Nikolay Svain	New People	542	8.22%
Dmitry Patlusov	A Just Russia – For Truth	217	3.29%
Total		6,594	100%

==== District 12 ====
Summary of the 12–14 September 2025 Kostroma Oblast Duma election in District 12
Candidate	Party	Votes	%
Ilya Dzezyulya	Communist Party	5,022	52.44%
Vadim Bryukhanov	United Russia	3,660	38.22%
Konstantin Fomichev	Liberal Democratic Party	236	2.46%
Aleksandr Maksimov	New People	205	2.14%
Yekaterina Lebedeva	A Just Russia – For Truth	141	1.47%
Dmitry Shestakov	Party of Pensioners	95	0.99%
Total		9,577	100%

==== District 13 ====
Summary of the 12–14 September 2025 Kostroma Oblast Duma election in District 13
Candidate	Party	Votes	%
Vladimir Baldin (incumbent)	United Russia	3,684	44.10%
Yury Mindolin	Liberal Democratic Party	1,324	15.85%
Anastasia Tatarinova	New People	1,308	15.66%
Tatyana Smirnova	A Just Russia – For Truth	915	10.95%
Yury Shestakov	Party of Pensioners	775	9.28%
Total		8,353	100%

==== District 14 ====
Summary of the 12–14 September 2025 Kostroma Oblast Duma election in District 14
Candidate	Party	Votes	%
Aleksandr Yegorov	United Russia	6,300	61.58%
Sergey Karavaykov	Communist Party	1,571	15.36%
Kirill Ilyasov	Liberal Democratic Party	1,280	12.51%
Sergey Piskarev	Party of Pensioners	741	7.24%
Total		10,230	100%

==== District 15 ====
Summary of the 12–14 September 2025 Kostroma Oblast Duma election in District 15
Candidate	Party	Votes	%
Sergey Zudin (incumbent)	United Russia	4,703	48.01%
Anastasia Nikonorova	Communist Party	1,245	12.71%
Aleksey Berdyshev	Liberal Democratic Party	1,003	10.24%
Yury Kudryavtsev	Party of Pensioners	930	9.49%
Natalia Kryukova	New People	823	8.40%
Maksim Kirillov	A Just Russia – For Truth	768	7.84%
Total		9,796	100%

==== District 16 ====
Summary of the 12–14 September 2025 Kostroma Oblast Duma election in District 16
Candidate	Party	Votes	%
Oleg Skobelkin (incumbent)	United Russia	5,799	60.18%
Yury Smirnov	Communist Party	1,663	17.26%
Olga Malinina	Liberal Democratic Party	1,173	12.17%
Igor Prudnikov	New People	774	8.03%
Total		9,636	100%

==== District 17 ====
Summary of the 12–14 September 2025 Kostroma Oblast Duma election in District 17
Candidate	Party	Votes	%
Maksim Kalentsov	A Just Russia – For Truth	4,189	51.09%
Olga Drobysheva (incumbent)	United Russia	2,394	29.20%
Aleksandr Dubinin	Communist Party	734	8.95%
Dmitry Khazov	New People	498	6.07%
Dmitry Firago	Party of Pensioners	197	2.40%
Total		8,199	100%

==== District 18 ====
Summary of the 12–14 September 2025 Kostroma Oblast Duma election in District 18
Candidate	Party	Votes	%
Aleksandr Plyusnin (incumbent)	United Russia	4,990	60.44%
Mikhail Rumyantsev	Communist Party	1,420	17.20%
Daniil Potekhin	A Just Russia – For Truth	606	7.34%
Vladimir Vinogradov	Party of Pensioners	545	6.60%
Natalya Kalembrik	Liberal Democratic Party	275	3.33%
Diana Topadze	New People	187	2.27%
Total		8,256	100%

==== District 19 ====
Summary of the 12–14 September 2025 Kostroma Oblast Duma election in District 19
Candidate	Party	Votes	%
Marina Smirnova	Liberal Democratic Party	3,961	41.49%
Valery Izhitsky	Communist Party	2,506	26.25%
Anton Gromov	Party of Pensioners	1,143	11.97%
Svyatoslav Marinkin	New People	1,118	11.71%
Darya Ushakova	A Just Russia – For Truth	607	6.36%
Total		9,548	100%

==== District 20 ====
Summary of the 12–14 September 2025 Kostroma Oblast Duma election in District 20
Candidate	Party	Votes	%
Aleksey Baranov (incumbent)	United Russia	5,154	54.04%
Aleksandr Khorobrykh	Communist Party	1,372	14.39%
Nikolay Tsvil	A Just Russia – For Truth	1,342	14.07%
Anton Kudryashov	Liberal Democratic Party	1,025	10.75%
Svetlana Korotkova	New People	426	4.47%
Total		9,537	100%

==== District 21 ====
Summary of the 12–14 September 2025 Kostroma Oblast Duma election in District 21
Candidate	Party	Votes	%
Aleksey Isakov (incumbent)	United Russia	7,831	67.36%
Igor Veselov	Party of Pensioners	1,151	9.90%
Olga Senina	Liberal Democratic Party	1,071	9.21%
Polina Vericheva	Communist Party	643	5.53%
Alyona Brigeman	A Just Russia – For Truth	470	4.04%
Aleksandr Malinovsky	New People	264	2.27%
Total		11,625	100%

==== District 22 ====
Summary of the 12–14 September 2025 Kostroma Oblast Duma election in District 22
Candidate	Party	Votes	%
Vyacheslav Golovnikov (incumbent)	A Just Russia – For Truth	4,421	51.68%
Mikhail Mishankin	United Russia	2,395	28.00%
Tatyana Merkulova	Liberal Democratic Party	512	5.99%
Aleksandr Firsov	Communist Party	479	5.60%
Ruslan Gapirov	New People	332	3.88%
Svetlana Yurchenko	Party of Pensioners	247	2.89%
Total		8,554	100%

==== District 23 ====
Summary of the 12–14 September 2025 Kostroma Oblast Duma election in District 23
Candidate	Party	Votes	%
Aleksandr Konovalov (incumbent)	United Russia	3,155	44.37%
Yulia Kambulova	Communist Party	1,159	16.30%
Irina Karbasova	Liberal Democratic Party	1,140	16.03%
Oleg Lukachyov	New People	952	13.39%
Yevgenia Krylova	A Just Russia – For Truth	461	6.48%
Total		7,111	100%

==== District 24 ====
Summary of the 12–14 September 2025 Kostroma Oblast Duma election in District 24
Candidate	Party	Votes	%
Anatoly Krayev (incumbent)	United Russia	3,834	44.29%
Irina Vershinina	Communist Party	2,471	28.55%
Ruslan Fedorov	Liberal Democratic Party	1,300	15.02%
Arkhip Beneskul	New People	453	5.23%
Nadezhda Ruze	A Just Russia – For Truth	318	3.67%
Total		8,656	100%

==== District 25 ====
Summary of the 12–14 September 2025 Kostroma Oblast Duma election in District 25
Candidate	Party	Votes	%
Vadim Kurbanov (incumbent)	United Russia	6,794	64.30%
Nikolay Kuznetsov	Liberal Democratic Party	2,103	19.90%
Boris Gorshkov	Communist Party	1,477	13.98%
Total		10,566	100%

=== Members ===
Incumbent deputies are highlighted with bold, elected members who declined to take a seat are marked with ~~strikethrough~~.

Constituency
No.	Member	Party
1	Ilya Nevsky	United Russia
2	Sergey Demenkov	United Russia
3	Vladimir Khramov	United Russia
4	Yevgeny Maslennikov	United Russia
5	Vladimir Komissarov	United Russia
6	Anna Fedorenko	United Russia
7	Vadim Slyusarenko	United Russia
8	Sergey Galichev	United Russia
9	Vadim Kozyrev	United Russia
10	Nadezhda Shcherbakova	United Russia
11	Ivan Bryukhanov	United Russia
12	Ilya Dzezyulya	Communist Party
13	Vladimir Baldin	United Russia
14	Aleksandr Yegorov	United Russia
15	Sergey Zudin	United Russia
16	Oleg Skobelkin	United Russia
17	Maksim Kalentsov	A Just Russia – For Truth
18	Aleksandr Plyusnin	United Russia
19	Marina Smirnova	Liberal Democratic Party
20	Aleksey Baranov	United Russia
21	Aleksey Isakov	United Russia
22	Vyacheslav Golovnikov	A Just Russia – For Truth
23	Aleksandr Konovalov	United Russia
24	Anatoly Krayev	United Russia
25	Vadim Kurbanov	United Russia

Party lists
Member	Party
Nikolay Kopytov	United Russia
Svetlana Kirillova	United Russia
Aleksey Anokhin	United Russia
Mikhail Dushin	United Russia
Vladimir Unguryan	United Russia
~~Irina Ponomareva~~	Liberal Democratic Party
~~Yevgeny Korablev~~	Liberal Democratic Party
~~Aleksandr Vasilyev~~	Liberal Democratic Party
~~Anastasia Milakova~~	Liberal Democratic Party
~~Vyacheslav Matokhin~~	Liberal Democratic Party
~~Lyudmila Yeremeyeva~~	Liberal Democratic Party
~~Yelizaveta Lonskaya~~	Liberal Democratic Party
~~Anna Gorchagova~~	Liberal Democratic Party
~~Natalya Kalembrik~~	Liberal Democratic Party
~~Galina Yevgrafova~~	Liberal Democratic Party
~~Olga Malinina~~	Liberal Democratic Party
Ruslan Fedorov	Liberal Democratic Party
~~Olga Panova~~	Communist Party
~~Sergey Karavaykov~~	Communist Party
~~Anastasia Nikonorova~~	Communist Party
~~Sergey Shpotin~~	Communist Party
~~Ilya Smirnov~~	Communist Party
~~Dmitry Kuzmin~~	Communist Party
~~Dmitry Plaksin~~	Communist Party
~~Aleksandr Kiselev~~	Communist Party
~~Aleksandr Ivanovsky~~	Communist Party
~~Ivan Saburov~~	Communist Party
~~Aleksey Tsypilev~~	Communist Party
~~Leonid Serov~~	Communist Party
Valery Izhitsky	Communist Party
Anton Gromov	Party of Pensioners
Pavel Zayfidi	New People
Nikolay Tsvil	A Just Russia – For Truth

== See also ==
- 2025 Russian regional elections
