= Kalashnik (surname) =

Kalashnik is a Russian and occupational surname, meaning "maker of kalaches". A man who made kalaches was called a калачник (kalachnik), which sometimes by sandhi effect became калашник (kalashnik). The Ukrainian-language version is Kalashnyk. Other English-spelling variants include Kalachnik, Kalachnyk, Kalačnik, Kalašnik, Kalasnik or Kolashnik, Kolachnik, Kolashnyk, Kolachnyk, Kolačnik, Kolašnik, Kolasnik.

It may refer to the following persons:

- Aleksei Kalashnik (born 1983), Russian professional football player of Ukrainian descent.
- Anna Kalashnyk (born 1992), Ukrainian artistic gymnast
- Pavlo Kalashnik (1847–1909), traditional Ukrainian artisan, potter.
- Sergey Kalashnik (born 1978), Russian politician.
- Stanislav Kalashnik (1948–2010), Ukrainian architect, artist, known for creating a general plan for the development of the city of Ternopil between 1982 and 2002.
- Volodymyr Kalashnik (1936–2022), Ukrainian linguist, professor and academic.
- Yakiv Kalashnik (1927–1967), Ukrainian painter.
