= Nikolai Zhuravlev =

Russian politician

- Николай Журавлёв
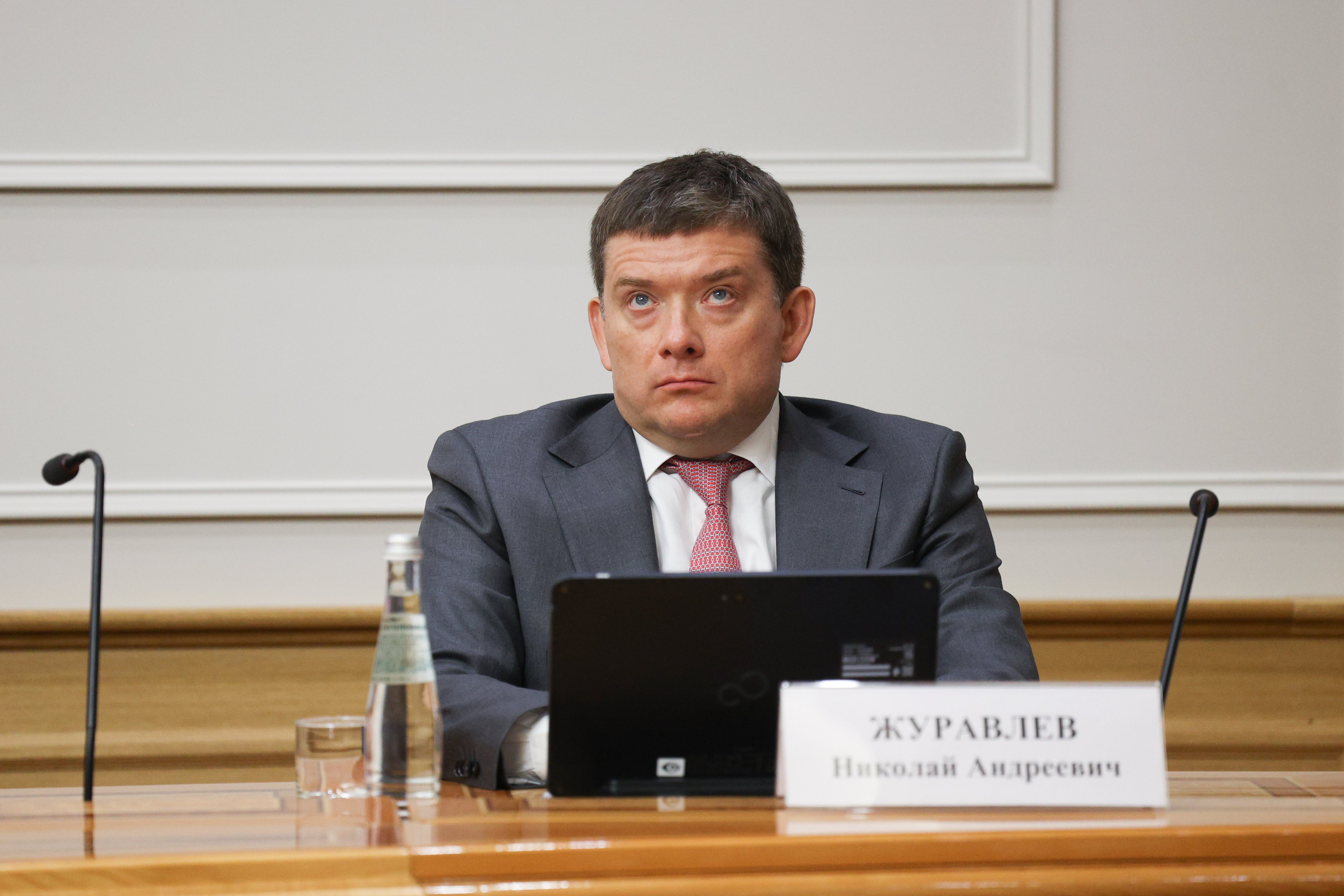

Senator from Kostroma Oblast
- Incumbent
- Assumed office 18 May 2011
- Preceded by: Vasily Duma

Personal details
- Born: Nikolai Zhuravlev; 1 September 1976 (age 50) Moscow, Russian Soviet Federative Socialist Republic, Soviet Union
- Party: United Russia
- Education: Financial University under the Government of the Russian Federation

Nikolai Andreyevich Zhuravlev (Russian: Николай Андреевич Журавлёв; born 1 September 1976) is a Russian politician serving as a senator from Kostroma Oblast since 18 May 2011.

== Career ==
Nikolai Zhuravlev was born on 1 September 1976 in Moscow. In 1988, he graduated from the Financial University under the Government of the Russian Federation. From 2002 to 2011, he worked as the chairman of the Board of OOO Investment Commercial Bank Sovcombank (Kostroma). From 2005 to 2011, Zhuravlev served as deputy of the Kostroma Oblast Duma of the 4th and 5th convocations. On 18 May 2011, he became the senator from Kostroma Oblast.

== Sanctions ==
Nikolai Zhuravlev is under personal sanctions introduced by the European Union, the United Kingdom, the United States, Canada, Switzerland, Australia, Ukraine, New Zealand, for ratifying the decisions of the "Treaty of Friendship, Cooperation and Mutual Assistance between the Russian Federation and the Donetsk People's Republic and between the Russian Federation and the Luhansk People's Republic" and providing political and economic support for Russia's annexation of Ukrainian territories.
