= Sergey Sitnikov =

Russian politician (born 1963)

- Сергей Ситников
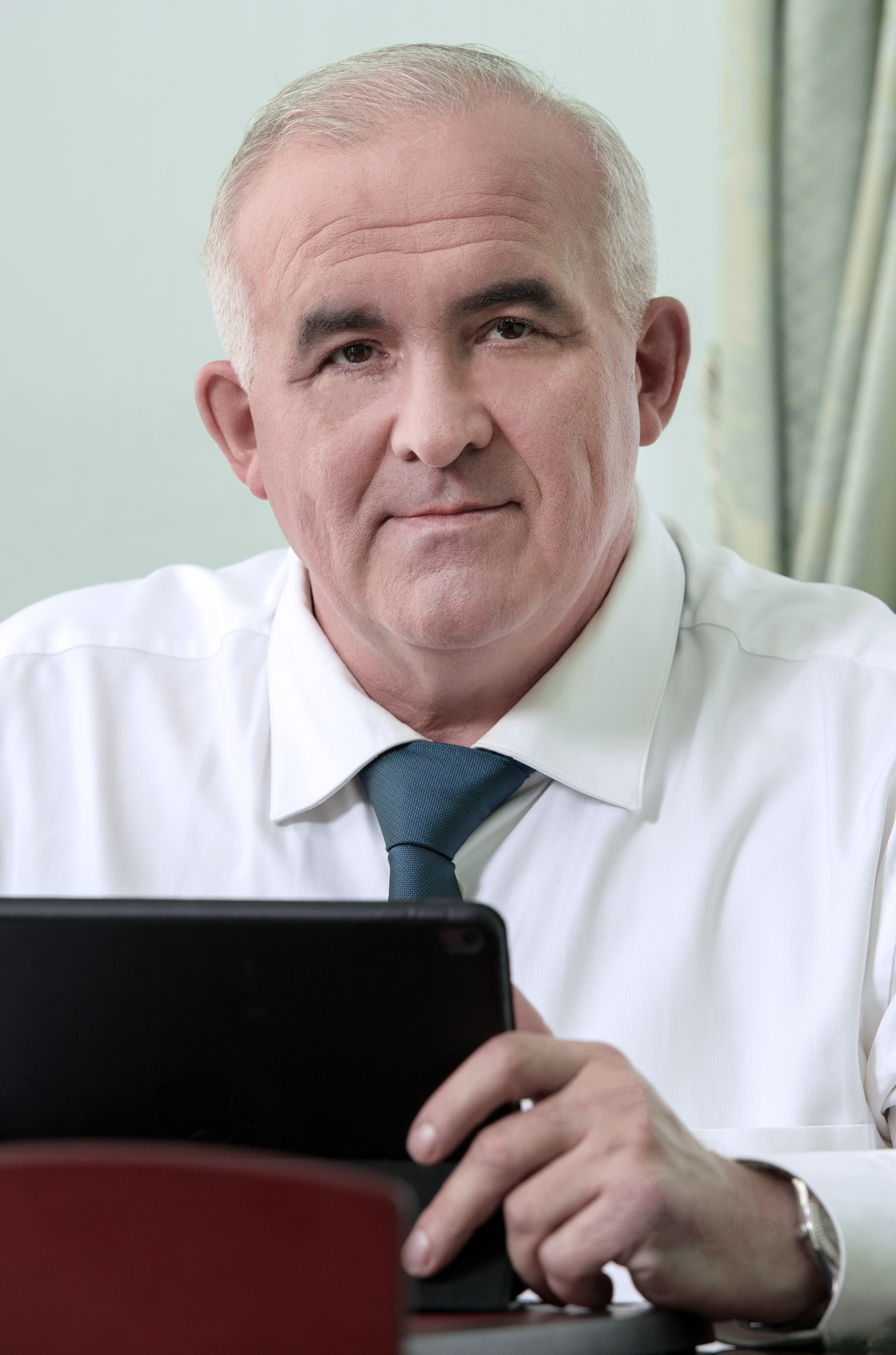
- Sitnikov in 2020

4th Governor of Kostroma Oblast
- Incumbent
- Assumed office 15 October 2015

Governor of Kostroma Oblast (acting)
- In office 15 May 2015 – 15 October 2015

4th Governor of Kostroma Oblast
- In office 28 April 2012 – 15 May 2015
- Preceded by: Igor Slyunyayev

Governor of Kostroma Oblast (acting)
- In office 13 April 2012 – 28 April 2012

Head of Roskomnadzor
- In office 8 December 2008 – 13 April 2012
- Succeeded by: Aleksandr Zharov

Member of the Kostroma Oblast Duma
- In office 4 December 2005 – July 2007

Personal details
- Born: Sergey Konstantinovich Sitnikov; 18 January 1963 (age 63) Kostroma, Soviet Union
- Party: Independent
- Spouse: Marina Vasilyevna
- Children: Konstantin
- Education: Kostroma State Pedagogical Institute

Sergey Konstantinovich Sitnikov (Russian: Сергей Константинович Ситников; born 18 January 1963) is a Russian politician and statesman. He has been the 4th Governor of Kostroma Oblast since 28 April 2012.

== Biography ==
Sergey Sitnikov was born on 18 January 1963 in Kostroma.

In 1986, he graduated from the Faculty of History and Pedagogics of the Kostroma State Pedagogical Institute with a degree in History and Social Science Teacher, Methodist of Educational Work.

From 1986 to 1987, he served in the army.

From November 1987 to February 1991, he worked in the Kostroma Regional Committee of the All-Union Leninist Young Communist League, where he worked his way up from an instructor in the department of Komsomol organizations to the head of the ideological department, and was then the secretary.

In 1991, (according to other sources - since 1989) he became the chief editor of the Kostroma newspaper "Young Leninist", which from 14 December 1991 became known as "Youth Line".

From 1992 to 1998, he served as chairman of the Committee for Youth, Family and Childhood Affairs of the Kostroma Region. In 1998, he was appointed head of the State Television and Radio Broadcasting Company Kostroma (a branch of the All-Russian State Television and Radio Broadcasting Company). In parallel, from September 2002 to December 2004, he was the chairman of the Kaliningrad Yantar State Television and Radio Broadcasting Company, as well as the deputy director of the St. Petersburg Radio Baltika.

In August 2004, he became the head of the Baltic Media Group holding, created by Oleg Rudnov, but left this post in December. He returned to Kostroma, where until July 2007 he again headed the Kostroma branch of the All-Russian State Television and Radio Broadcasting Company (GTRK Kostroma).

In the elections to the Kostroma Oblast Duma of the 4th convocation, held on 4 December 2005 and held according to a mixed system, Sitnikov ran on the list of the United Russia party. Having received a deputy mandate, he was a member of the committee on regulations and parliamentary ethics.

From July 2007 to July 2008, he had been the Deputy Head of the Federal Service for Supervision of Mass Communications, Communications and Cultural Heritage Protection (Roskomnadzor). In July 2008, he has been deputy head of the service, and on 8 December 2008, he was appointed head of Roskomnadzor.

On 13 April 2012, after the resignation of the governor of Kostroma Oblast, Igor Slyunyayev, Sitnikob was appointed the acting governor of the region, and on the same day he was dismissed from the post of head of Roskomnadzor. On 25 April, President Dmitry Medvedev submitted Sitnikov's candidacy to the Kostroma Oblast Duma to approve him for the post of governor of the Kostroma Oblast, and on 28 April, Sitnikov was unanimously approved as the governor, taking office the same day.

On 15 May 2015, Russian President Vladimir Putin accepted the early resignation of Sitnikov, and appointed him acting head of the region.

In the election of the governor of the Kostroma Oblast on 13 September 2015, Sitnikov, who ran for the United Russia party, won the election, receiving 65.62% of the vote. On 15 October, he officially took office.

He was a member of the State Council of Russia from 22 November 2016 to 26 May 2017, as a member of the presidium. He had been the head of the commission of the working group of the State Council on the development of effective mechanisms for a modern system of long-term care for the elderly.

During the Single Voting Day in September 2020, in the election of the Governor of the Kostroma Oblast, Sitnikov, gaining 64.65% of the vote with a turnout of 31.98% of the total number of registered voters, outstripped all his opponents, winning the election, and continued to work as the head of the region.

== Personal life ==
=== Family ===
He is married to Marina Vasilyevna, who works as a doctor in the public health system of the Kostroma Oblast.

His son, Konstantin, graduated from the Faculty of Biology of Kostroma State University. N. A. Nekrasov, until December 2017 he worked as the director of the Museum of Nature of the Kostroma Oblast. Currently, he is Vice President of the Future Now Charitable Foundation.

He also has a grandson, Sergei Sitnikov Jr, (born in 2012) and a granddaughter Nadezhda (born in 2019). Sitnikov, along with his son, and grandchildren, were born in the city maternity hospital in Kostroma.

=== Hobbies ===
As a child, Sitnikov dreamed of owning his own horse. Previously, he was fond of fishing and hunting, but now he does not have time for this. Enjoys driving a car. He prefers to spend his vacation in Russia.

=== Social activity ===
Sitnikov is chairman of the Board of Trustees of the Kostroma Regional Branch of the Russian Geographical Society.

=== Attitude towards online media ===
At the end of 2009, Sitnikov's statement caused a wide resonance, in which he blamed the Internet media for readers' comments, stating: "“If the editors do not want complications with the supervisory authorities, then they should moderate their forum”.

In June 2010, Sitnikov, by his order, approved the procedure for moderating illegal comments on Internet media sites. In accordance with it, Roskomnadzor, in the event that the publication of comments from readers of online publications “with signs of abuse of freedom of the mass media”, had to send an electronic appeal to the media with a proposal to remove illegal comments from the site or edit them within 24 hours.

In December 2020, Russian President Vladimir Putin called for the expansion of moral and ethical standards to the Internet in the same volumes in which they apply to other areas.

The Internet should be subject to all the same rules that apply and have applied so far. I mean, first of all, the regulatory framework and moral and ethical standards that all of humanity has developed over the millennia. Yes, this is a new sphere, a new type of activity, new systems, but even so they should be applied to the same extent as in other area.

— Vladimir Putin during the discussion “Artificial intelligence is the main technology of the 21st century"

Ten years later, Sitnikov's decision on responsibility for the abuse of freedom of mass media on the Internet has actually become the norm of professional ethics.
