= Denis Kolesnikov =

Russian politician (born 1980)

- Денис Колесников

Member of the State Duma
- Incumbent
- Assumed office 30 September 2026
- Preceded by: Constituency created
- Constituency: Luhansk (No. 25) (Note: His constituency, Luhansk, has been controlled by the Russian-backed, separatist Luhansk People's Republic (LPR) since 2014. During the 2022 Russian invasion of Ukraine, Russia declared the annexation of the LPR. The UN General Assembly rejected the annexation under Resolution ES-11/4, and the vast majority of international countries do not recognise it either. The city is still internationally considered part of Ukraine but under Russian occupation.)

Deputy Chairman of the People's Assembly of the LPR
- In office 2023–2026

Personal details
- Born: Denis Sergeyevich Kolesnikov; 1 June 1980 (age 46) Voroshilovgrad, Ukrainian SSR, Soviet Union (now Luhansk)
- Party: United Russia
- Education: Luhansk University (2015, 2017); Kostroma State University (2023)

Denis Sergeyevich Kolesnikov (Russian: Денис Сергеевич Колесников; born 1 June 1980) is a Russian and formerly Ukrainian politician who has served as a member of the State Duma of the 9th convocation for the United Russia party since 2026. Prior to this, he was involved in politics in the Luhansk People's Republic (LPR), having first been elected to the People's Assembly there in 2014, and he was also Deputy Chairman of the People's Assembly of the LPR from 2023 to 2026.

== Early life ==
Kolesnikov was born on 1 June 1980 in what was then the city of Voroshilovgrad (now Luhansk), which was part of the Ukrainian SSR of the Soviet Union at the time of his birth. After secondary school, he immediately started working, beginning his career as a senior foreman at the agricultural crop processing plant of "Selkhozservis" in Luhansk in 1998. After two years, in 2000, he left to become a construction engineer at the UKB in Luhansk. He held this position for eight years, until 2008, when he left to engage in private entrepreneurial activities in the field of construction and road transport. In 2010, Kolesnikov founded the company "LuhanskStroyBureau", which he led up until 2014, when the War in the Donbas started.

Since then, he has graduated from Luhansk University in 2015 with a degree in psychology, again at the same university in 2017 with a degree in state and municipal administration, and in 2023 from Kostroma State University with a degree in jurisprudence.

== Political career ==
=== 2014-2026: In the LPR ===
In November 2014, he was elected a deputy of the People's Assembly of the self-proclaimed Luhansk People's Republic (LPR). During his time in the People's Assembly, Kolesnikov was Head of the Committee on International Relations, Communications, Information Policy, and Mass Media. In 2023, after the disputed annexation of the LPR, the People's Assembly was reformed into the People's Council, to which he was elected. Later, he was also appointed Deputy Chairman of the People's Council as a member of the Russian party, United Russia.

=== 2026-present: State Duma ===
In 2026, Kolesnikov announced his candidacy for the upcoming 2026 Russian legislative elections to the 9th convocation. As this was the first state Duma elections where constituencies were introduced for the newly annexed Luhansk People's Republic, although the annexation was not recognised by the majority of the international community, Kuksenkova ran within the new constituency No. 25. The 25th district consisted of the cities of Luhansk and Pervomaisk, alongside cities that were captured in 2022, such as Rubizhne, Lysychannsk, Sievierodonetsk, Kreminna, and Starobilsk. During his election campaign, Kolesnikov said that he would bring legislation in the LPR to be in line with the state of Russian legislation, "restore" the region, improve housing, and "strengthen family values". He won with 56.21% of the vote against Alexei Biletsky, another deputy of the People's Council.

== Personal life ==
He is married and has three children.

== International sanctions ==
On 4 August 2022, Makarov was included on the international sanctions list of the European Union for his association with the LPR. He has also been included on the French sanctions register as part of his sanctions under the EU, and the national asset freezing list of Monaco in compliance with the EU since 2022. Other countries include: Japan, Switzerland, the United Kingdom, and Canada. In Ukraine, he has been included in the sanction list since 2016.
