= Albina Kirillova =

- Альбина Кириллова
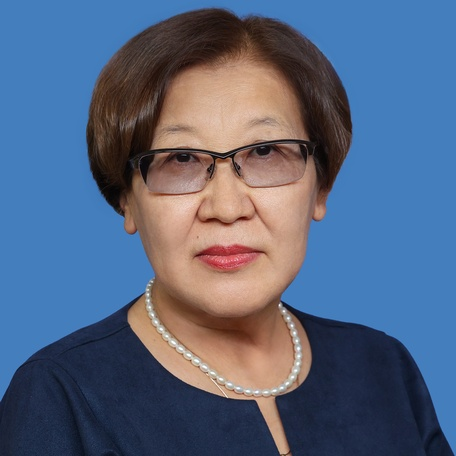

Senator from Republic of Buryatia
- In office 22 October 2025 – Incumbent
- Preceded by: Vyacheslav Nagovitsyn

Personal details
- Born: 1 January 1961 (age 65) Gakhany, RSFSR, Soviet Union
- Party: Independent
- Education: Irkutsk State University
- Awards: Medal of the Order "For Merit to the Fatherland"

Albina Aleksandrovna Kirillova (Russian: Альбина Александровна Кириллова; born January 1, 1961) is a senator of the Federal Council representing the executive branch of the Republic of Buryatia. By Resolution No. 472-SF of the Federation Council of October 29, 2025, she was appointed to the Federation Council Committee on Science, Education, and Culture.

== Biography ==
She was born on January 1, 1961, in the village of Gakhany, Ekhirit-Bulagatsky District, Irkutsk Oblast.

She graduated from the Law School of Irkutsk State University in 1985.

Since 1985, she has worked as an attorney for the Buryat Bar Association. She was also the head of the Zakamensk Legal Clinic.

From 1986 to 1992, she was a judge, and from 1992 to 1995, she was the chairperson of the Kabansky District Court of the Republic of Buryatia.

In April 1995, she was appointed a judge of the Supreme Court of Buryatia.

From October 2008 to February 2013, she served as Deputy Chairperson of the Supreme Court of Buryatia (appointed on October 30, 2008).

From February 2013 to December 2024, she served as Chairperson of the Supreme Court of the Republic of Buryatia (appointed on February 2, 2013 and December 30, 2018).

She holds a PhD in law. In 2014, she defended her dissertation on "Fundamentals of Forensic Methodology in Criminal Murder Cases: Part 1 of Article 105 of the Criminal Code of the Russian Federation" at the Kuban State Agrarian University. She is an Associate Professor at the Higher Attestation Commission (2017). She holds the first qualification class as a judge (2002).

=== Federation Council ===
Since 2025, she has been delegated as a representative of the Buryatia Republic Administration to the Federation Council of Russia. She assumed her powers on October 22, 2025. She replaced Vyacheslav Nagovitsyn in this position in the Federation Council.

Since October 2025, Albina Aleksandrovna's colleague and namesake, Senator Svetlana Kirillova from the Kostroma Oblast Duma, has also joined the Federation Council.
