= Governor of Kostroma Oblast =

Highest-ranking official in Kostroma Oblast, Russia

- Coat of arms of Kostroma Oblast

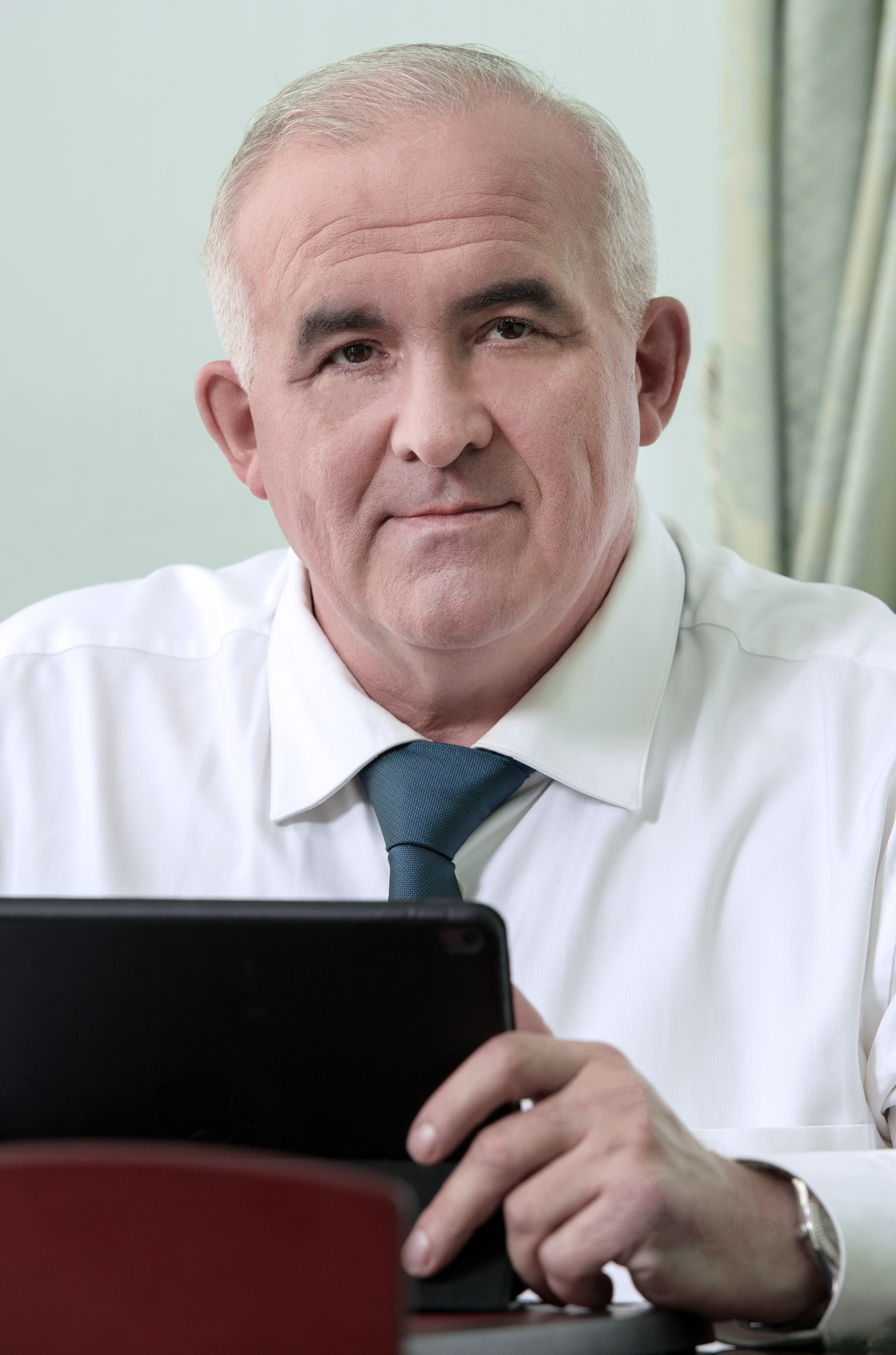
- Incumbent; Sergey Sitnikov since 13 April 2012
- Status: Head of federal subject
- Seat: Kostroma
- Term length: 5 years
- Constituting instrument: Charter of Kostroma Oblast, Section 4
- Formation: 1991
- First holder: Valery Arbuzov
- Website: adm44.ru

The Governor of Kostroma Oblast (Russian: Губернатор Костромской области) is the head of government of Kostroma Oblast, a federal subject of Russia.

The position was introduced in 1991 as Head of Administration of Kostroma Oblast. The Governor is elected by direct popular vote for a term of five years.

== List of officeholders ==
No.	Image	Governor	Tenure	Time in office	Party	Election
1		Valery Arbuzov (born 1939)	14 December 1991 – 5 January 1997 (lost election)	5 years, 22 days	Independent	Appointed
2		Viktor Shershunov (1950–2007)	5 January 1997 – 20 September 2007 (died in office)	10 years, 258 days	Independent → United Russia	1996; 2000; 2005
–		Yury Tsikunov (born 1947)	20 September 2007 – 25 October 2007	35 days	Independent	Acting
3		Igor Slyunyayev (born 1966)	25 October 2007 – 13 April 2012 (resigned)	4 years, 171 days	United Russia	2007
–		Sergey Sitnikov (born 1963)	13 April 2012 – 28 April 2012	14 years, 147 days	Independent	Acting
4		Sergey Sitnikov (born 1963)	28 April 2012 – 15 May 2015 (resigned)	14 years, 147 days	Independent	2012
–		Sergey Sitnikov (born 1963)	15 May 2015 – 15 October 2015	14 years, 147 days	Independent	Acting
(4)		Sergey Sitnikov (born 1963)	15 October 2015 – present	14 years, 147 days	Independent	2015; 2020; 2025
