= Sergey Kalashnik =

Russian politician (born 1978)

- Сергей Калашник
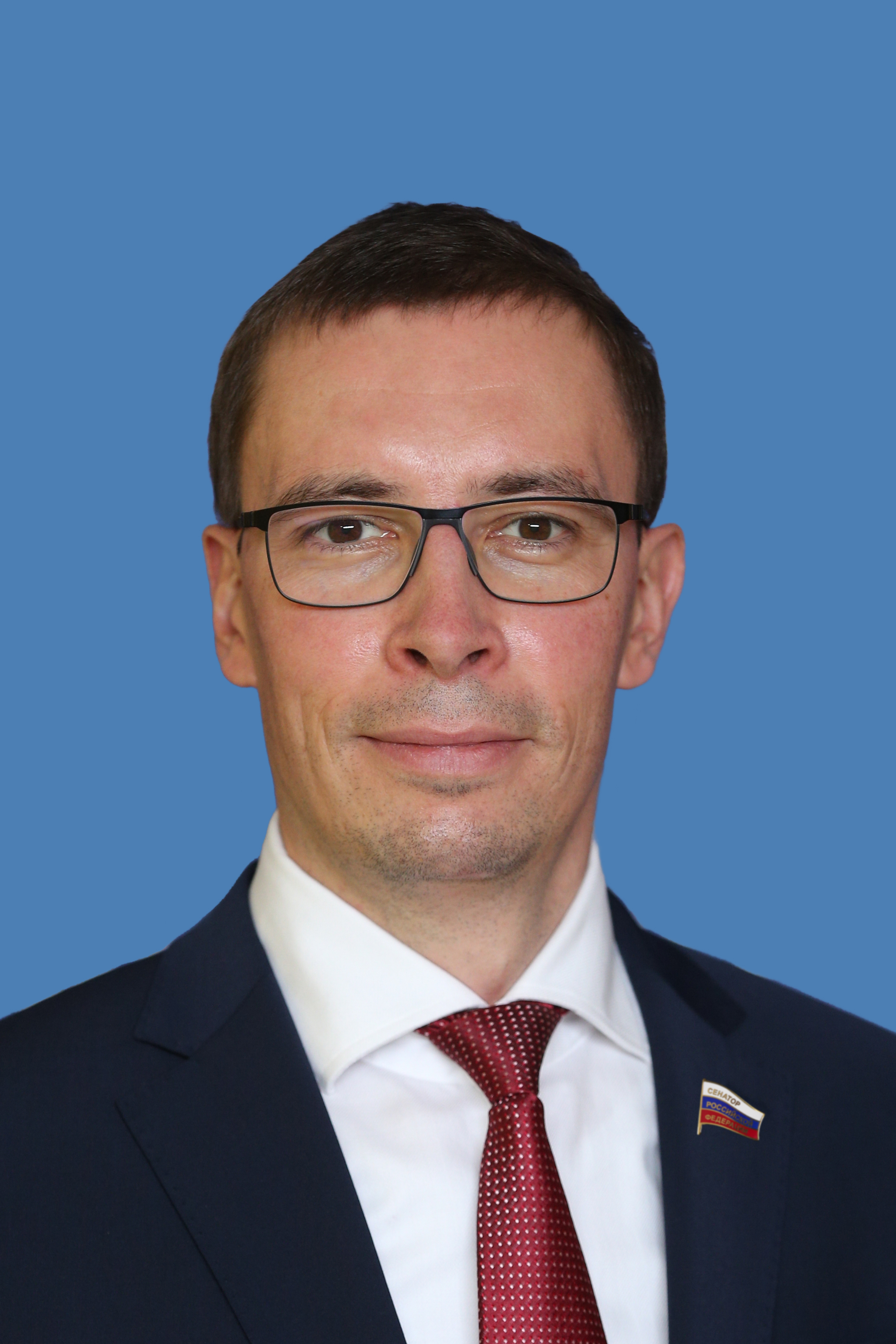

Senator from Kostroma Oblast
- In office 5 October 2020 – 8 October 2025
- Preceded by: Mikhail Kozlov
- Succeeded by: Svetlana Kirillova

Personal details
- Born: Sergey Kalashnik; 31 March 1978 (age 48) Kostroma, Kostroma Oblast, Russian Soviet Federative Socialist Republic, Soviet Union
- Party: United Russia
- Education: Kostroma State University

Sergey Viktorovich Kalashnik (Russian: Сергей Викторович Калашник; born 31 March 1978) is a Russian politician serving as a senator from Kostroma Oblast since 5 October 2020.

== Career ==
Sergey Kalashnik was born on 31 March 1978 in Kostroma, Kostroma Oblast. In 2000, he graduated from the Kostroma State University. Afterward, he worked as the head of the production and dispatching department in the machining shop of OAO "Kostroma plant "Motordetal". From 2010 to 2020, he was the deputy of the Kostroma Oblast Duma. On 5 October 2020, Muratov was appointed the senator from Kostroma Oblast.

== Sanctions ==
Sergey Kalashnik is under personal sanctions introduced by the European Union, the United Kingdom, the USA, Canada, Switzerland, Australia, Ukraine, New Zealand, for ratifying the decisions of the "Treaty of Friendship, Cooperation and Mutual Assistance between the Russian Federation and the Donetsk People's Republic and between the Russian Federation and the Luhansk People's Republic" and providing political and economic support for Russia's annexation of Ukrainian territories.
