= Viktor Shershunov =

Russian politician (1950–2007)

- Виктор Шершунов
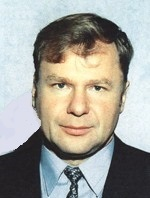

Governor of Kostroma Oblast
- In office 5 January 1997 – 20 September 2007
- Preceded by: Valery Arbuzov
- Succeeded by: Igor Slyunyayev

Member of the Federation Council from Kostroma Oblast
- In office 1997–2001

Personal details
- Born: 16 November 1950 Lenger, Chimkent Oblast, Kazakh SSR, Soviet Union
- Died: 20 September 2007 (aged 56) Sergiyevo-Posadsky District, Moscow Oblast, Russia
- Party: CPRF → United Russia
- Education: Kazan State University

Viktor Andreyevich Shershunov (Russian: Виктор Андреевич Шершунов; 16 November 1950 – 20 September 2007) was the governor of Kostroma Oblast, Russia, from 1997 to 2007. He previously worked at the Prosecutor's Office of Kostroma Oblast.

Born in Lenger (now Kazakhstan). After graduating from the Kazan State University he was appointed an investigator of the Galich prosecutor's office, and in 1978 he became an investigator, then a senior investigator of the prosecutor's office of Sverdlovsk district of Kostroma. Since 1994, Shershunov worked in the city administration.

Shershunov was elected governor in 1996 and re-elected in 2000 with a large majority. In 2005, he was reappointed by Vladimir Putin after direct elections for governors was replaced with presidential appointment.

He was a member of the Communist Party of the Russian Federation. He was also a member of the Federation Council until its reform in 2001. On 20 September 2007, Viktor Shershunov died in a car crash in Moscow Oblast at the 76th kilometer of the Yaroslavl highway. He was buried on September 22 at the central cemetery of Kostroma. He was married and had three sons.
