= List of chairmen of the Kostroma Oblast Duma =

The chairman of the Kostroma Oblast Duma is the presiding officer of that legislature.

== Office-holders ==
Name	Took office	Left office
Andrey Bychkov	1994	2000
Valery Izhitsky	2000	2005
Andrey Bychkov	2005	Present

== Sources ==
- Kostroma Oblast Duma
