= Igor Kirillov (general) =

Russian general (1970–2024)

- Игорь Анатольевич Кириллов
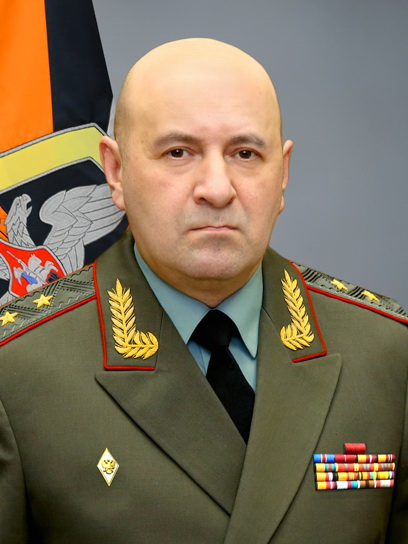
- Kirillov in 2019
- Born: 13 July 1970; Kostroma, Russian SFSR, Soviet Union
- Died: 17 December 2024 (aged 54); Moscow, Russia
- Cause of death: Assassinated by scooter bombing
- Education: NBC Protection Military Academy
- Spouse: Svetlana Kirillova
- Military career
- Allegiance: Russia
- Branch: Russian Ground Forces
- Rank: Lieutenant general
- Commands: Russian NBC Protection Troops
- Awards: Hero of Labour of the Russian Federation; Order "For Merit to the Fatherland"; Order of Military Merit; Medal of the Order "For Merit to the Fatherland"; Medal "For Military Valour"; Medal "For Strengthening of Brotherhood in Arms"; Medal "For Distinguished Military Service"; Medal "For Participation in Victory Day Military Parade"; Medal "Participant of the military operation in Syria"

Igor Anatolyevich Kirillov (Russian: Игорь Анатольевич Кириллов; 13 July 1970 – 17 December 2024) was a Russian lieutenant general. He was the head of the Chemical, Biological, and Nuclear Defense Troops of the Russian Armed Forces. He held a Candidate of Military Sciences degree. He was awarded the title Hero of the Russian Federation (2024, posthumous) and was a Hero of Labour of the Russian Federation (2021), becoming the first person to receive both honors.

Kirillov's military unit has been accused by the US and Ukraine of having used the chemical weapon chloropicrin during the Russia's 2022 invasion of Ukraine, outlawed internationally by the Chemical Weapons Convention, which Russia has ratified. He was subject to multiple economic sanctions and a Ukrainian arrest warrant for deploying chloropicrin against enemy troops.

On 17 December 2024, Kirillov was killed in Moscow by the detonation of an explosive device as a result of a Security Service of Ukraine (SBU) special operation.

== Biography ==
Igor Kirillov was born on 13 July 1970 in Kostroma, Russian Soviet Republic.

Kirillov was in the Armed Forces of the USSR from 1987. In 1991, he graduated with honours from the Kostroma Higher Military Command School of Chemical Defense. From 1991 to 1994, he served as a platoon commander in the Western Group of Forces. After the latter left Germany, he served in the Moscow Military District. From 1995, he held positions successively from company commander to brigade commander of a separate radiation, chemical, and biological protection brigade.

From 2005 to 2007, Kirillov studied at the NBC Protection Military Academy.

From 2009, Kirillov served in various positions in the Office of the Chief of the Russian NBC Protection Troops of the Russian Armed Forces.

In September 2014, Kirillov was appointed head of the Timoshenko NBC Protection Military Academy.

In April 2017, Kirillov became the head of the NBC Protection Troops of the Armed Forces of the Russian Federation. He took part in the creation and adoption of the new multiple rocket launcher TOS-2 "Tosochka".

=== Russian invasion of Ukraine ===
Following the Russian invasion of Ukraine, for direct participation in military actions against a sovereign state, Kirillov was added to international sanctions lists, including Canada (23 February 2022), Ukraine (19 October 2022), and the United Kingdom (8 October 2024).

According to the Security Service of Ukraine, since February 2022, there have been 4,800 cases of deployment of chemical weapons by Russia in the invasion of Ukraine. Kirillov appeared regularly on Russian television during the war, where he accused the U.S. of helping Ukraine build secret laboratories for biological weapons and claimed Ukraine was developing a dirty bomb, claims for which there is no evidence.

According to the U.S. Department of State, Russia used chloropicrin under Kirillov's auspices, a choking agent widely used in World War I, as well as tear gas on the battlefield. The chemical weapons included combat grenades equipped with the irritant chemical agents CS and CN, which are banned in warfare under the Chemical Weapons Convention.

On 16 December 2024, Ukraine charged Kirillov in absentia for using banned chemical weapons during the Russo-Ukrainian war. According to Ukrainian officials, over 2,000 troops were hospitalized and three died as a result of chemical weapons attacks under Kirillov's command.

== Assassination ==
Dashcam footage showing Kirillov's assassination

Kirillov was killed in an explosion in Moscow on 17 December 2024 at approximately 6:12 a.m. MSK. He died along with an assistant whose name was given by Russian authorities as Ilya Polikarpov (Russian: Илья Поликарпов) as they were leaving a residential complex along the Ryazansky Prospekt area. The blast was caused by a detonation of an explosive device planted on an electric scooter, which was powerful enough to shatter windows in a building across the street. According to Russian state media, the explosive device contained approximately the same amount of explosives as those used in the 2010 Moscow Metro bombings that killed 40 people and injured 80. The explosive device contained approximately 300 grams of TNT equivalent.

=== Reactions ===
The Security Service of Ukraine claimed responsibility for the assassination. A source in the Security Service of Ukraine stated that Kirillov "was a war criminal and a perfectly legitimate target" and warned that "such a disgraceful end awaits all those who kill Ukrainians." According to Russian state media TASS, investigators found a hidden camera used to monitor Kirillov in a car-sharing vehicle nearby.

Following the assassination, former president Dmitry Medvedev, who serves as deputy chairman of the Russian Security Council, pledged "inevitable retaliation" against Ukraine's military and political leadership. Other Russian officials paid tribute to Kirillov following his death. Maria Zakharova, spokesperson for the Russian Foreign Ministry, said Kirillov "worked fearlessly" and "did not hide behind backs." Andrey Kartapolov, chairman of the Defense Committee of the State Duma, called him a "dignified Russian general" and "leader of his organization who was looked up to." After the assassination, Vyacheslav Volodin, chairman of the State Duma, held a moment of silence for Kirillov, describing him as "not only a military leader, but first and foremost a scientist."

A spokesman for British Prime Minister Keir Starmer said London was "not going to mourn" Kirillov's death, saying he had "imposed suffering and death on the Ukrainian people".

State Department spokesman Matthew Miller confirmed the United States was "not aware of it in advance and was not involved", while denouncing Kirillov's "atrocities" and involvement in chemical weapons use against Ukrainian forces.

=== Arrest of suspect ===
On 18 December, a day after the assassination, the Russian Federal Security Service (FSB) announced that a male 29-year-old Uzbek national had been arrested under suspicion of involvement in the assassination. The FSB claimed that the suspect had confessed that he was recruited by Ukrainian intelligence agencies to conduct the assassination and that the operation had been livestreamed by Ukrainian operatives based in Dnipro. He was subsequently named as Akhmad Kurbanov and has been remanded for two months pre-trial detention. A video circulated on Telegram shows Kurbanov stating that he was acting on instructions from the Security Service of Ukraine and had been promised $100,000 and a "european passport".

On 21 January 2026, Kurbanov was sentenced to life imprisonment. Three accomplices received prison terms ranging from 18 to 25 years.

== Awards ==
- Hero of the Russian Federation (December 2024; posthumous);
- Hero of Labour of the Russian Federation (16 August 2021) – for exceptional labour merits, dedication, and professionalism displayed in carrying out important state tasks;
- Order "For Merit to the Fatherland" 3rd Class;
- Order "For Merit to the Fatherland" 4th Class;
- Order of Military Merit;
- Medal of the Order "For Merit to the Fatherland" 2nd Class;
- Honorary Citizen of Kostroma Oblast (7 July 2022) – for exceptional merits, dedication, and professionalism displayed in carrying out state tasks, as well as for personal services to Kostroma Oblast;
- Departmental awards of the Ministry of Defence of the Russian Federation;
- Medal of Saint Andrew Bogolyubsky of the Vladimir Diocese of the Russian Orthodox Church – for exceptional services in the spiritual and moral education of the personnel of the Armed Forces of the Russian Federation.

== See also ==
- List of Russian generals killed during the Russian invasion of Ukraine
