= NBC Defense Military Academy =

Education organization in Kostroma, Russia

Coordinates: 57°46′35″N 40°55′47″E

Marshal Semyon Timoshenko NBC Defense Military Academy
- Военная академия РХБ защиты имени Маршала Советского Союза С. К. Тимошенко
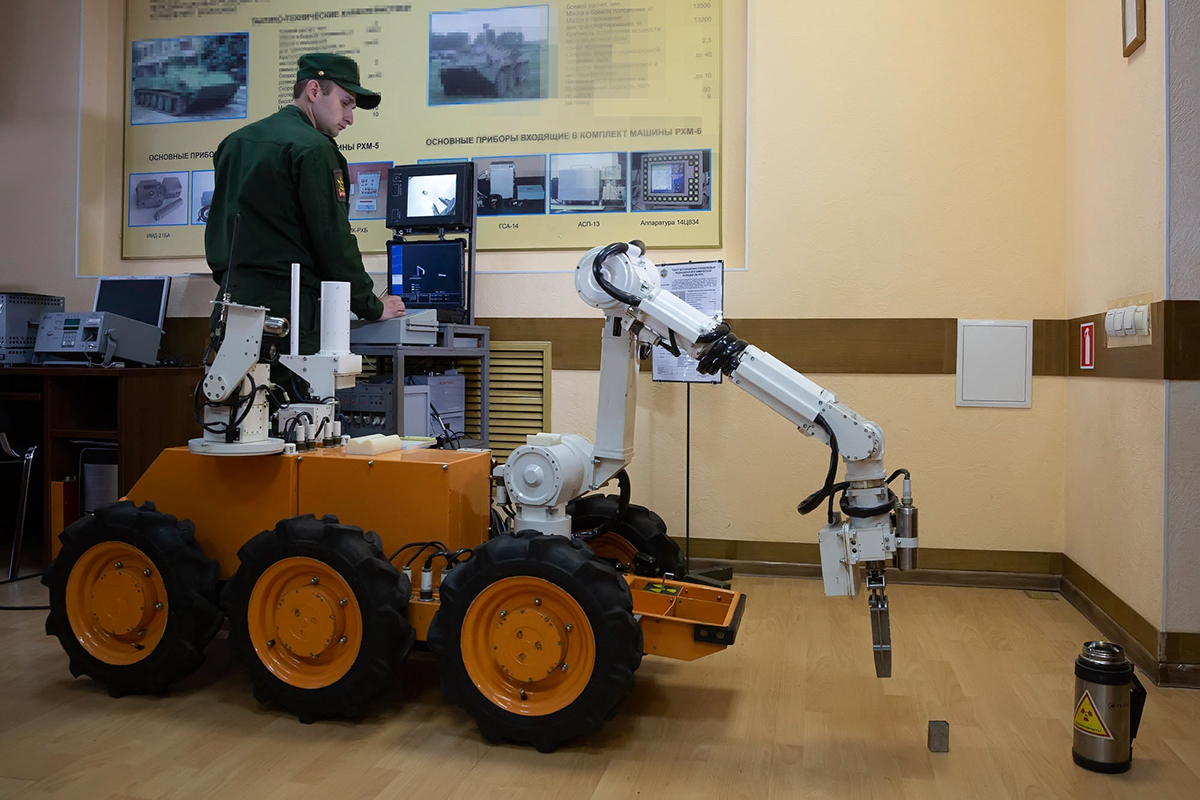
- An unmanned ground vehicle at the academy.
- Type: Military academy
- Established: 1932
- Rector: Major General Igor Yemelyanov
- Location: Kostroma, Russia
- Campus: Urban
- Website: Официальный сайт академии (in Russian)

The Marshal Semyon Timoshenko Nuclear, Biological and Chemical Defense Military Academy (Военная академия РХБ защиты имени Маршала Советского Союза С. К. Тимошенко) is a military university in Kostroma training officers for service in the Russian NBC Defense Troops of the Russian Ground Forces. It was established in 1932 in Moscow and is named after Semyon Timoshenko. It provides training and conducts research related to the protection of military and civilian personnel from the weapons of mass destruction.

== History ==
The Military Chemical Academy of the Red Army was created in accordance with the resolution Council of Labor and Defense and by direct order of the Revolutionary Military Council on 13 May 1932, on the basis of the military chemical department of the Military Technical Academy of the Red Army and the 2nd Moscow Institute of Chemical Technology. The formation of the academy was completed by 1 October 1932. Its structure included the military engineering, special and industrial faculties. By order of the Revolutionary Military Council on 15 May 1934, it was given the honorific name Kliment Voroshilov. In 1937, the academy was renamed to the Military Academy of Chemical Defense named after Voroshilov. In 1958, by decree of the Council of Ministers of the USSR of May 27 No. 2052, the academy was renamed into the Military Academy of Chemical Defense (the name of "Voroshilov" was withdrawn). In connection with the golden jubilee anniversary of the Soviet Army and the Soviet Navy in 1968, the Presidium of the Supreme Soviet of the Soviet Union on Defender of the Fatherland Day awarded the academy with the Order of the Red Banner. Two years later, it was given the honorific "Semyon Timoshenko". In 1982, it was awarded with the Order of the October Revolution in honour of the 50th anniversary. Over 30 graduates of the academy were awarded with the titles of the Hero of the Soviet Union, Hero of Socialist Labour, and Hero of Russia.

== Academy Music Band ==
The band was created in 1968 on the basis of the Band of the Kostroma Higher Command School of Chemical Defense and has taken part in all the most significant events of the Kostroma Oblast. Over the years, the unit has been led by such military conductors as Alexei Dmitriev, Viktor Valuev, Alexander Kolesnikov (an Honored Artist of Uzbekistan), and Alexander Povzhik. Since 1999, the band has been led by Lieutenant Colonel Eduard Klein. It has performed during the opening of an automobile bridge across the Volga River, a new building of the railway station, a circus, and the first high-speed train from Kostroma-Yaroslavl. In 2002, the band took part in the visit of the Patriarch Alexy II of Moscow. In 2010, the band took part in the production of Modest Mussorgsky's opera Khovanshchina on Susaninskaya Square in Kostroma in collaboration with the Novaya Opera Theatre. From 2010 to 2012, the band participated in military parades on Red Square.

== Heads of the Academy ==
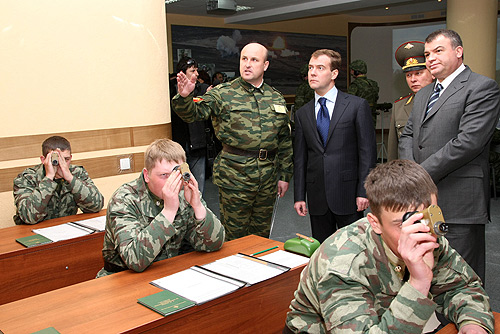
Dmitry Medvedev and Anatoliy Serdyukov at the academy in May 2008.

- Corps Commissioner Yakov Avinovitsky (1932-1937)
- Major General Pyotry Lovyagin (1937-1941)
- Military Engineer of the 1st Rank Yuri Klyachko (1941-1942)
- Colonel Alexey Kislov (1942)
- Lieutenant General of the Technical Troops Dmitry Petukhov (1942-1960)
- Colonel General of the Technical Troops Dmitry Gorbovsky (1960-1972)
- Colonel General of the Technical Troops Vladimir Myasnikov (1972-1990)
- Lieutenant General Vladimir Kavunov (1990-1993)
- Lieutenant General Boris Ivanov (1993-1996)
- Lieutenant General Yuri Koryakin (1996-2002)
- Lieutenant General Vladimir Manchenko (2002-2005)
- Lieutenant General Nikolai Alimov (2005-2007)
- Major General Yevgeni Kuchinsky (2007-2012)
- Colonel Aleksey Bakin (2012—2014)
- Major General Igor Kirillov (2014—2017)
- Major General Igor Emelyanov (2017—Present)

== See also ==
- Budyonny Military Academy of the Signal Corps
