= Svetlana Kirillova =

Russian politician

- Светлана Кириллова
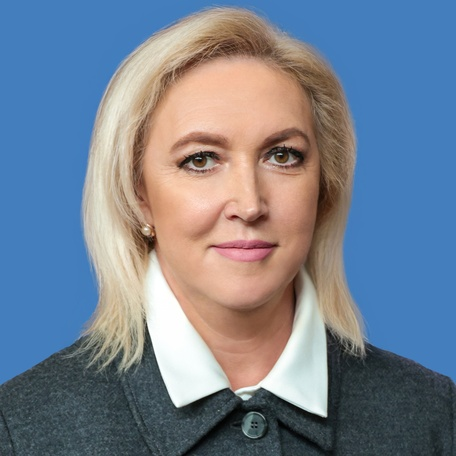

Senator from Kemerovo Oblast
- Incumbent
- Assumed office 8 October 2025
- Preceded by: Sergey Kalashnik

Personal details
- Born: 24 January 1973 (age 53) Kostroma, RSFSR, Soviet Union
- Party: United Russia
- Education: Kursk State Medical University; State University of Education

Military service
- Branch/service: Russian Armed Forces
- Rank: Major

Svetlana Mikhailovna Kirillova (Russian: Светлана Михайловна Кириллова; born January 24, 1973, in Kostroma) is a Russian military medic and a politician. She has served as a Senator of the Federation Council since 2025. She is also a member of the Federation Council Committee on Social Policy.

== Biography ==
Born January 24, 1973, in Kostroma, she graduated from Kursk State Medical University and Moscow Regional State University.

Since 1998, she has served in the Russian Armed Forces as a major in the medical service. She headed the Women's Council of the Radiation, Chemical, and Biological Defense Troops. She has been awarded medals of distinction of the 1st, 2nd, and 3rd degrees, the Medal "For Military Valor", the Medal "Veteran of a Special Risk Unit", the "Mentor of Youth" badge, the medals "For the Fight Against the COVID-19 Pandemic" and "For Assistance and Mercy", and also received a Letter of Gratitude from the Speaker of the Federation Council.

On October 8, 2025, she was appointed Senator of the Russian Federation – representative of the Kostroma Oblast Duma (in May 2025, she won the United Russia party primaries and was elected to the regional Duma in September).

She was married to Lieutenant General Igor Kirillov, Chief of the Russian NBC Protection Troops.

In October 2025, Svetlana Mikhailovna's colleague and namesake, Albina Kirillova (a Senator from the Republic of Buryatia), also joined the Federation Council.
