= Igor Albin =

Russian politician (born 1966)

- Игорь Албин
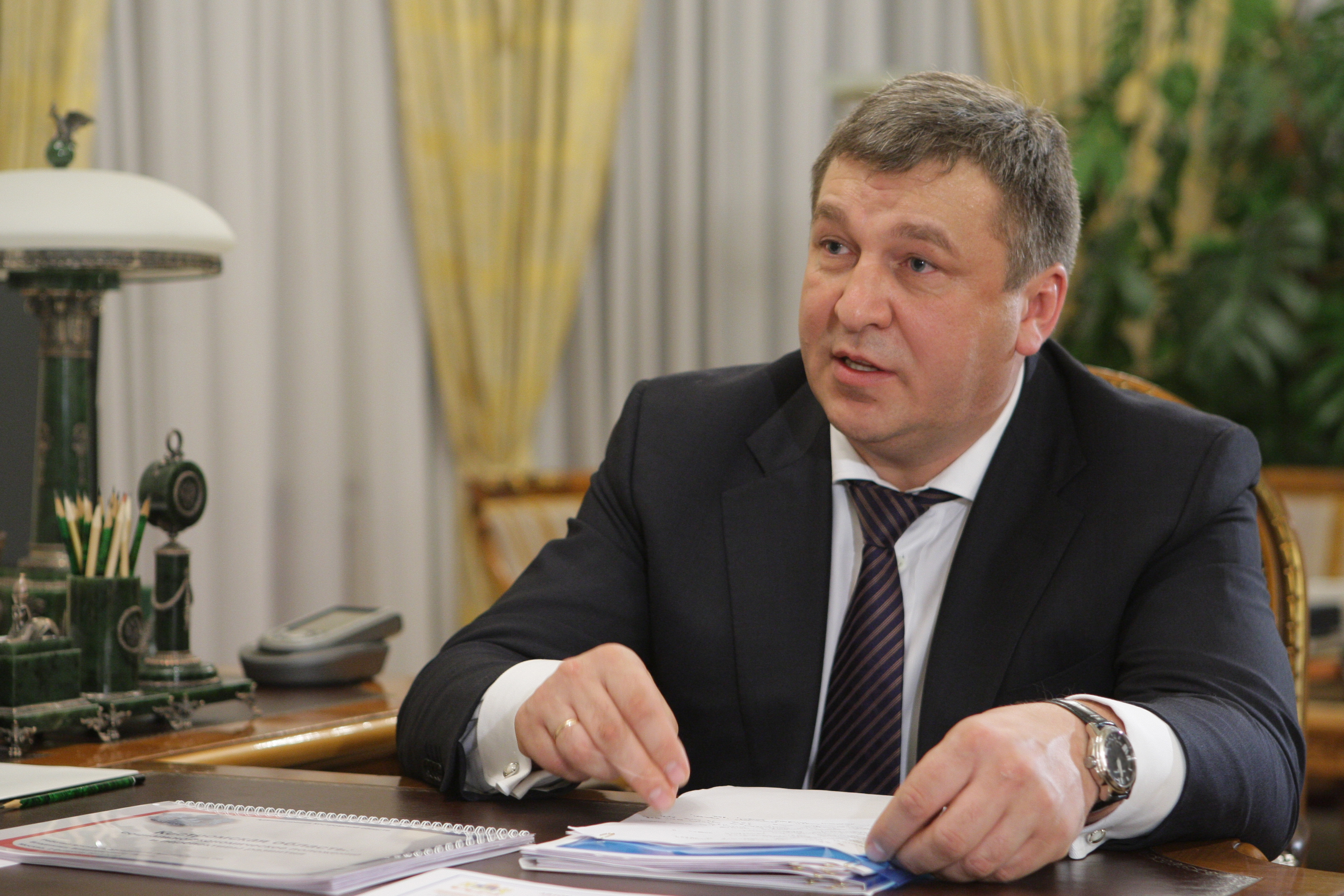
- Albin in 2011

Deputy Governor of Saint Petersburg
- In office 12 November 2014 – 26 December 2018
- Governor: Georgy Poltavchenko; Alexander Beglov

6th Minister of Regional Development
- In office 17 October 2012 – 8 September 2014
- Preceded by: Oleg Govorun
- Succeeded by: ministry dissolved

3rd Governor of Kostroma Oblast
- In office 25 October 2007 – 13 April 2012
- Preceded by: Viktor Shershunov
- Succeeded by: Sergey Sitnikov

Russian Federation Senator from Altai Krai
- In office 25 January 2006 – 25 October 2007
- Preceded by: Timur Temirbulatov
- Succeeded by: Yury Shamkov

Personal details
- Born: Igor Nikolayevich Slyunyayev; 4 October 1966 (age 59) Isilkul, Omsk Oblast, RSFSR, Soviet Union
- Party: United Russia
- Education: MVD Academy of Management; Russian Academy of State Service

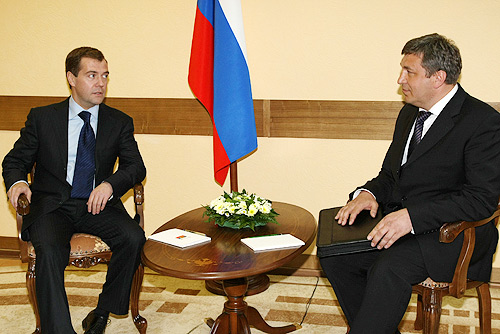
President of Russia Dmitry Medvedev and Igor Slyunyayev

Igor Nikolayevich Albin (Russian: Игорь Николаевич Албин, until 2014 Igor Slyunyayev (Игорь Слюняев), born 4 October 1966) is a Russian politician, former Vice Governor of Saint Petersburg (2014–2018).

He has the federal state civilian service rank of 1st class Active State Councillor of the Russian Federation.

== Biography ==
Igor Slyunyayev was born in 1966 in the town of Isilkul, Omsk Oblast. From 1984 to 1986 he served in the airborne troops of the Soviet Army. In 1988 he became a student, and then an adjunct of the Moscow Higher School of the USSR Interior Ministry, from which he graduated in 1992.

From 1994 to 1996 - deputy chairman of the board of Mossibinterbank, advisor for economics and finance of the Russian Union of Industrialists and Entrepreneurs. Since 1996, Slyunyayev was an adviser to the affairs department, head of the financial and credit relations, from January 1997 to November 1998 - deputy minister for Cooperation with the CIS member states. In February 1999, Slyunyaev took the post of head of the department for road funds of the Federal Road Service of Russia, and in August 1999 - deputy general director of the Federal Road Agency.

From 2000 to 2004 - deputy minister of transport of Russia. From 2006 to 2007 - a representative of the executive branch of Altai Krai in the Federation Council of Russia. Slyunyayev was deputy chairman of the Federation Council committee on budget.

=== Governor ===
On 23 October 2007, president of Russia Vladimir Putin nominated Slyunyaev for governor of Kostroma Oblast, month after governor Viktor Shershunov died in a car crash. On October 25, Kostroma Oblast Duma voted in favor of Slyunyayev, and he assumed the position.

In 2007–2011 Kostroma Oblast moved from 75th to 9th place in the rating of Russian regions by effectiveness of the executive authorities, made by the Ministry of Regional Development. At the same time, the external debt of Kostroma Oblast reached 9.28 billion rubles by December 2011.

Slyunyayev was No. 1 on United Russia regional party list in the election to the 6th State Duma, acting as a "locomotive" (political technology aimed at increasing voter turnout by including a well-known figures in the party list. After winning, the candidate immediately refuses the position that they have been elected to, passing their mandate on to a party member who is less known to voters). Nevertheless, in Kostroma Oblast the ruling party showed one of the lowest results in the country (30.74% with a turnout of 58.6%), which motivated Slyunyayev to resign on 13 April 2012.

=== Further offices ===
In October 2012 he was appointed to the position of Minister of Regional Development and remained in office until the ministry was dissolved in September 2014.

In November 2014, he was appointed Vice Governor of Saint Petersburg responsible for construction, urban planning, cultural heritage, transport and energy. Just before his appointment he changed his last name from Slyunyayev to Albin following genealogical research. In December 2018, Albin left the city administration, soon after the resignation of governor Georgy Poltavchenko. Rumors about Albin's possible resign circulated long before that, mainly claims were caused by numerous long-term construction and controversial investment policy.
