= Aleksei Kalashnik =

Russian footballer

Personal information
- Full name: Aleksei Alekseyevich Kalashnik
- Date of birth: 20 January 1983 (age 43)
- Height: 1.73 m (5 ft 8 in)
- Position: Midfielder

Senior career*
Years	Team	Apps	(Gls)
2001	FC Rostselmash Rostov-on-Don	0	(0)
2003	FC Reutov	3	(0)
2003	FC Kristall Smolensk	21	(0)
2004	FC Reutov	26	(0)
2006	FC Bataysk (amateur)		
2007–2008	FC Bataysk-2007	62	(3)
2009	FC Dynamo Bryansk	30	(4)
2010	FC Volgar-Gazprom Astrakhan	3	(0)
2010–2012	FC Neftekhimik Nizhnekamsk	42	(4)
2012	FC Sokol Saratov	3	(1)
2012–2013	FC Avangard Kursk	6	(0)
- * Club domestic league appearances and goals

Aleksei Alekseyevich Kalashnik (Russian: Алексей Алексеевич Калашник; born 20 January 1983) is a former Russian professional football player.

== Club career ==
He played two seasons in the Russian Football National League for FC Kristall Smolensk and FC Volgar-Gazprom Astrakhan.
