= Alexey Chepa =

Russian politician (born 1955)

Alexey Chepa MP
- Алексей Чепа
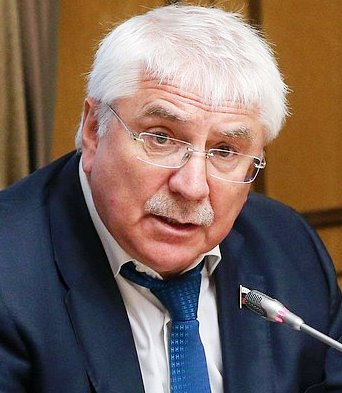
- Chepa in 2018

Member of the State Duma (Party List Seat)
- Incumbent
- Assumed office 21 December 2011

Personal details
- Born: 22 November 1955 (age 70) Kapustin Yar, Astrakhan Oblast, Russian SFSR, Soviet Union
- Party: A Just Russia — For Truth
- Spouse: Irina Valentinovna
- Children: 3 (1 son, 2 daughters)
- Parent: Vasily Ivanovich Chepa (father)
- Education: Moscow Aviation Institute; MAP Central Institute for Advanced Studies

Alexey Vasilyevich Chepa (Russian: Алексей Васильевич Чепа; born 22 November 1955) is a Russian politician who has served as a deputy of the 6th, 7th, and 8th State Dumas.

== History ==
After graduating from the Moscow Aviation Institute, he worked at closed defense enterprises in Moscow and the Moscow Oblast. At the end of the 1980s, he engaged in business. In 1988, he co-founded the company on wood processing and production of building materials. At the beginning of the 1990s, he expanded his business entrepreneurship to African countries, including Angola, Namibia, Mozambique. Also, he occupied senior positions in the Avers CJSC, Quontum Ltd CJSC, Military-technical company for the sale of conversion equipment and equipment CJSC. In 2001, he founded the Interregional Agrarian Fund Fertility. From 2001 to 2005, he was a member of the Agrarian Party of Russia. In 2006, he held the position of Deputy Chairman of the Russian Land Union. In 2008, he became the secretary of the A Just Russia — For Truth. On December 4, 2011, he was elected deputy of the 6th State Duma. In 2016 and 2021, he was re-elected for the 7th, and 8th State Dumas, respectively.

== Family ==
Alexey Chepa has a daughter and a son. His son, Daniil Chepa, and daughter, Anastasia Chepa, are residents of the United Kingdom.

== Controversies ==
Media outlets have described Chepa as one of the business partners of Arcadi Gaydamak, an Israeli-French entrepreneur who was sentenced in absentia by a French court in 2009 to six years in prison for illegal arms supplies to Angola. The newspaper Vedomosti reported that Chepa had been an intelligence officer and conducted joint business ventures with Gaydamak in the 1990s. Chepa and Gaydamak acknowledge having shared investments in poultry farms.

“We have known each other for a long time [...] Mr. Chepa is the only truly genuine agricultural businessman.”

(Arcadi Gaydamak about Alexey Chepa in an interview with Vedomosti correspondent Svetlana Petrova, May 2005)

During his campaign for the State Duma, Alexey Chepa denied allegations of involvement in arms trading.

In 2020, he stated that Russia does not acknowledge responsibility for the massacre of Polish citizens in Katyn massacre, despite Russia having officially recognized responsibility in 2010.

=== Sanctions ===
He was sanctioned by Canada under the Special Economic Measures Act (S.C. 1992, c. 17) in relation to the Russian invasion of Ukraine for Grave Breach of International Peace and Security, and by the British government in 2022 in relation to the Russo-Ukrainian War.
