= Kostroma State University =

University in kostroma, Russia

- Костромской государственный университет
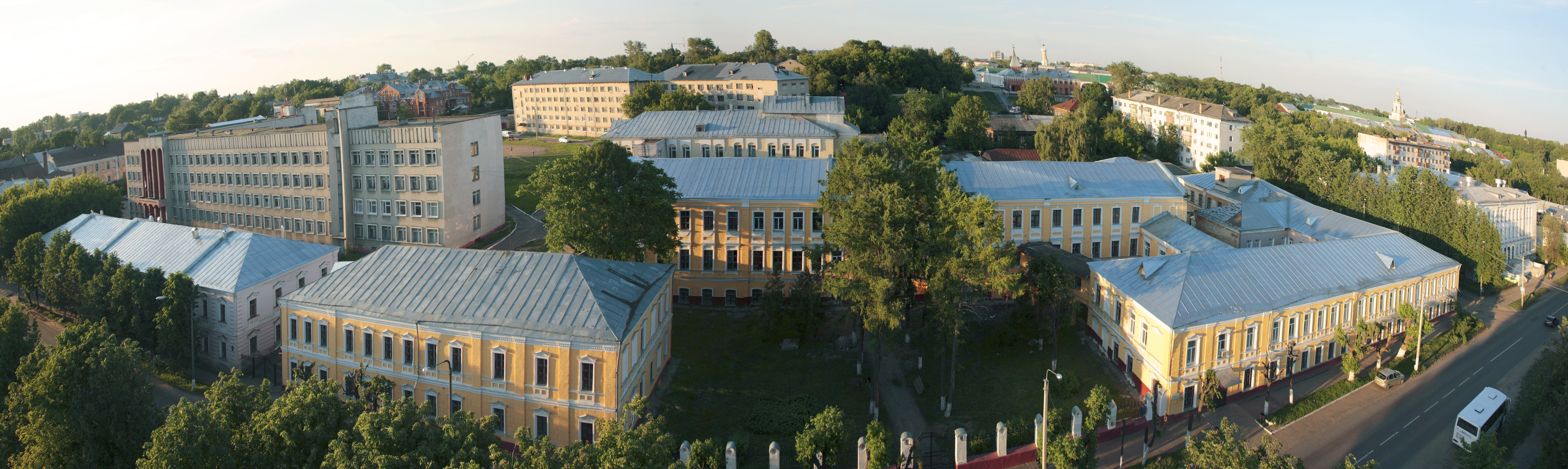
- Type: Public
- Established: 1870 (2016 in current form)
- Rector: Aleksandr Naumov
- Location: Dzerzhinskogo 17 str., Kostroma, Russia; 57.759740°N 40.943186°E
- Campus: Urban
- Nickname: KGU (Russian: КГУ)
- Website: www.ksu.edu.ru

Kostroma State University (Russian: Федеральное государственное бюджетное образовательное учреждение высшего образования «Костромской государственный университет» (КГУ)) is a public university in Kostroma, the capital city of Kostroma Oblast in Russia. It was created in its current form in 2016 with the merger of the Nekrasov Kostroma State University and the Kostroma State Technological University.

== History ==
=== Nekrasov Kostroma State University ===
The Nekrasov State University traced its history to the Kostroma State Workers' and Peasants' University which was the first university in the city and was formally established by the Decree of the Council of People's Commissars issued on January 21, 1919, declaring the establishment of the state university and decided to considered November 7, 1918 as the opening date.

=== Kostroma State Technological University ===
On November 1, 1931, the State Planning Committee of the RSFSR approved the proposal to open a textile institute in Kostroma. On July 26, 1932, the People's Commissariat of Light Industry appointed V. G. Bobrov as director of the Kostroma Textile Institute. The building of the former diocesan school, then occupied by land management, forestry, reclamation and flax technical schools (15 Dzerzhinskogo), was allocated for the future institute. in 1962, the Textile Institute was transformed into a technological institute. in 1995, the Institute of Technology was transformed into the Kostroma State Technological University.

=== Merger ===
The university in its current form was formed in accordance with the order of the Minister of Education and Science of the Russian Federation Dmitry Livanov No.196 issued on March 10, 2016 through the reorganization of two universities in the form of annexation: Kostroma State Technological University to Nekrasov Kostroma State University with the name after the merger Kostroma State University. As part of the merger, higher budgets invested in the new university.
