= Kostroma Oblast =

First-level administrative division of Russia

Kostroma Oblast Костромская область (Russian)
- Oblast
- Flag Coat of arms

- Coordinates: 58°33′N 43°41′E
- Country: Russia
- Federal district: Central
- Economic region: Central
- Established: August 13, 1944
- Administrative center: Kostroma

Government
  - Body: Oblast Duma
  - Governor: Sergey Sitnikov

Area
  - Total: 60,211 km^{2} (23,248 sq mi)
  - Rank: 47th

Population (2021 census)
  - Total: 580,976
  - Estimate (2018): 643,324
  - Rank: 68th
  - Density: 9.6490/km^{2} (24.991/sq mi)
  - Urban: 73.7%
  - Rural: 26.3%

GDP (nominal, 2024)
  - Total: ₽401 billion (US$4.71 billion)
  - Per capita: ₽711,210 (US$8,345.48)
- Time zone: UTC+3 (MSK)
- ISO 3166 code: RU-KOS
- License plates: 44
- OKTMO ID: 34000000
- Official languages: Russian
- Website: adm44.ru

Kostroma Oblast (Note: Russian: Костромска́я о́бласть, romanized: Kostromskaya oblastʹ, IPA: [kəstrɐm'skajə 'obləsʲtʲ]) is a federal subject of Russia (an oblast). Its administrative center is the city of Kostroma and its population as of the 2021 Census is 580,976. It was formed on August 13, 1944 on the territory detached from neighboring Yaroslavl Oblast.

Textile industries have been developed there since the early 18th century. Its major historic towns include Kostroma, Sharya, Nerekhta, Galich, Soligalich, and Makaryev.

== History ==
From c. 300 CE the current area of Kostroma, with the exception of the area east of the Unzha River, was part of the Finno-Ugric peoples' lands, such as the Merya people and their loose tribal confederation. During the Neolithic era, comb-ceramics replaced prafinno-Ugric Volosovo. At the turn of 3rd and 2nd millennia BCE, the Fatyanovo culture arrived in the area, later to be assimilated into the tribes of the Late Bronze Age (the Abashevo culture and the Pozdnyakovskaya culture). The Finno-Ugric component as a result of migration and assimilation and grew even stronger since the culture of the early Iron Age. The people who developed the art of smelting of bog ore are already clearly Finno-Ugric in character. As a result of the mixing of the Finno-Ugric and pyanoborskoy Anan'ino local cultures with the Finno-Ugric Dyakovo culture came the Mari people, which began to take shape in Kostroma. Historically, the Kostroma region is a territory of Mari residence. In the currently existing settlements and the Old-Kazhirovo Shangskoe where the capitals of the Mari principalities of Yaksha and Sanga. Possession of these kingdoms in the north to reach the Great in earlier times. The village area was Odoevskoye SHARINSKY Mari fortress Bulaksy.

There were at least 109 Merya settlements located in the area of which the most important below mentioned trading centers and important hill fortresses were later recorded by the Russians as the Russians founded towns in the late 9th to 12th centuries.

With the death in 1277 of Basil Yaroslavovych, who had no children and left no heirs, the land principality as unclaimed moved into the Vladimir principality. Then, the Grand Duke Vladimir Alexandrovich Dmitry lost Kostroma principality to his brother Andrei Alexandrovich Gorodetsky, who in turn gave this inheritance to his nephew, the son of Dmitry Ivan Dmitrievich, but shortly after Ivan D. to possess Pereiaslavl-Zaleski and Kostroma principality newly departed Andrei Alexandrovich and then in 1299, he gave the land to his son Boris. After the latter's death in 1303, the prince of Kostroma in 1304 was the son of Daniel of Moscow, Boris Daniilovich. At this relative independence of the Principality of Kostroma ended and later it became part of the lands of the princely House of Moscow.

For the first time in what is now the area were separated from each other by Peter I: in 1708 by dividing the country into provinces were created in the province of Kostroma, Moscow province, and in the Galician province of Arkhangelsk province. In 1778, the two territories were re-united in the Kostroma governorship, which has been linked with the Yaroslavl first, then with the Nizhny Novgorod, and later with the Governor-General in one of Vladimir General Government.

In 1797 Paul I abolished the Governor-General Vladimir and Kostroma and Kostroma instead governorship was created Kostroma Province, which existed in constant borders until 1917.

The conversion of the Kostroma province center sped up its economic and cultural development, even though in 1773 and 1779, the city was completely burned in the fire fighting. Since 1781 the city began to be built on the master plan, which was based on a radial- concentric grid of streets that converged on a large semi-circular central area in the open side of the Volga.

The end of the 18th and the first half of the 19th century is rightly considered the rise in cultural development (architecture, painting, literature), not only of Kostroma but also of other county-level cities such as Galic, Nerekhta, and Soligalich. Architectural ensembles in the classical style still adorn the centers of these cities. There were widespread noble estates, which have become centers of culture in the remote outskirts of the province.

After the October Revolution of 1917, Kostroma Province became part formed in 1918 by the Russian Federation.

During the First World War and the Civil War, active hostilities in the province's territory were not conducted. The change of power at the end of 1917 there was a peaceful way. During the Civil War and in the years formed the new government, repeatedly changing the province's administrative-territorial division.

The consequences of the civil war adversely affected the socio-economic and political life of the province of Kostroma. The gross production of Kostroma factories in 1921 compared to 1913 decreased by 70%, the number of workers decreased by 30%. In the linen industry, which has been leading in the province, there were only 4.7 million workers ( in 1913 - 15 thousand). At the first Republican Factory ( the former Big linen manufactory ), their number decreased from 7 to 1 million people in the mechanical plant of 1,300 workers have only 450. Due to lack of fuel and raw materials factory operated for only 6 months a year, from May to October - idle.

In the city of Kostroma in 1917, there were 17 libraries. Kostroma Province existed prior to 1917. Almost doubled compared with the prewar decreased acreage and yield of crops. The total cultivated area in the province in 1920 vs. 1917 dropped by 43%, including linen - 80%, barley - 62%, potatoes - by 50%, oats - by 50%, rye - 20% .

The Revolution opened the workers and peasants access to education. November 8, 1918, the grand opening of the worker- peasant Kostroma State University to commemorate the October Revolution of 1917, which adopted the workers and peasants without entrance exams. The university initially acted natural, humanitarian, and forest departments, and later - Teachers and Department of the Faculty of Medicine. In 1921, all faculties studied 3,333 students. Most of the teachers came from Moscow. Following the university in Kostroma in 1919, two more high schools - the Institute of Electrical and chemical industry and land management institute, were opened to prepare engineering and agricultural personnel.

Due to the severe consequences of the civil war and the transition to a new economic policy that resulted in the reduction of funding of educational institutions, the People's Commissariat of Education in autumn 1921 decided to close or reorganize several young university. Kostroma University was divided into two universities - Pedagogical Institute (Institute of Education ), and agricultural. Teacher's college in 1923 was reorganized into pedtehnikum. By the second half of the 1920s. of the four high schools and three secondary special educational institutions operating in the province in the first years of Soviet power, down to seven colleges. From 1922 to 1923, the number of educational institutions in the province of Kostroma has decreased by almost 25%.

In 1922, in the Nizhny Novgorod Oblast and transferred Varnavinsky Vetluzhsky counties. A January 14, 1929 Resolution of the Presidium of the Central Executive Committee Kostroma province was liquidated. Its territory was a part of the Kostroma region of Ivanovo Industrial Region.

The oblast was formed on August 13, 1944.

Essential for the region's economic development had continued at the Fifth Five-Year Plan railway construction Galich, Kostroma- length 127 km. She was admitted to the regular operation and operational in 1956. The newly built railway line has created direct access to Kostroma on the northern highway, mileage cargo from Kostroma to Galic dropped by more than half. The road much closer to the railway line a number of inland areas facilitated the supply of the city of Kostroma wood, peat, wood business. Improved communication of the regional center to remote centers of the region.

Between 1997 was a time of active reform and integration into the new socio-economic conditions of the social sphere. Translated to insurance principles of medical care, health, fundamental changes have occurred in the content of education and made fundamental changes in social protection. Despite the difficulties in these years, there was a deliberate with high-tech equipment of health facilities, modern information technology and sports equipment of educational institutions. Radically changed the infrastructure of social protection of the population and youth policy. On 21 May 1998 Kostroma alongside Amur, Ivanovo, Voronezh Oblast, and the Mari El Republic signed a power-sharing agreement with the federal government, granting it autonomy. This agreement would be abolished on 19 February 2002.

== Geography ==
Kostroma Oblast is bordered by Vologda Oblast to the north, Kirov Oblast to the east, Nizhny Novgorod Oblast and Ivanovo Oblast to the south, and Yaroslavl Oblast to the West. The main rivers are the Volga and the Kostroma. Much of the area is covered by woods, making it one of the principal timber-producing regions in Europe.

== Politics ==
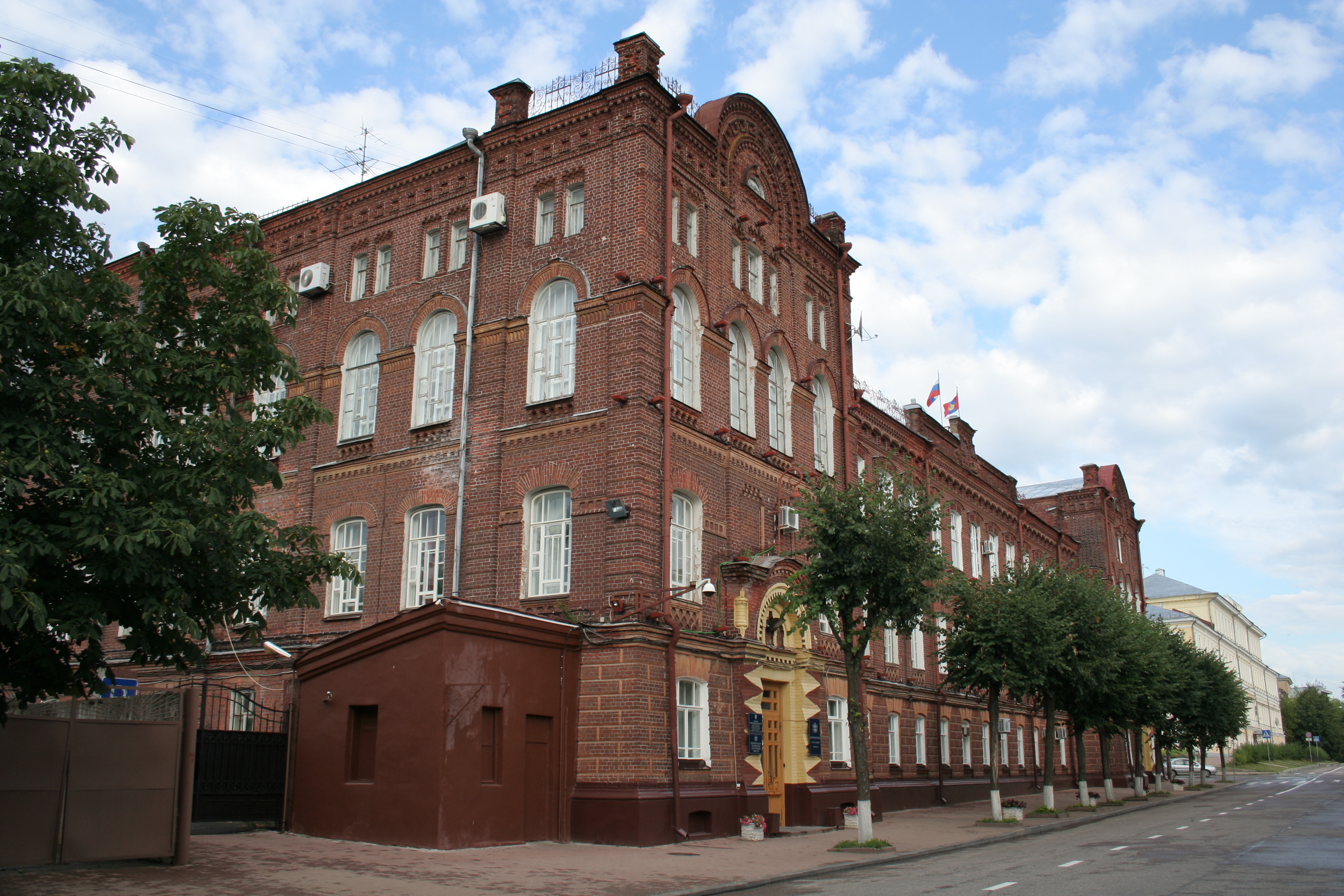
Seat of the Oblast Government

During the Soviet period, the high authority in the oblast was shared between three persons: The first secretary of the Kostroma CPSU Committee (who in reality had the biggest authority), the chairman of the oblast Soviet (legislative power), and the Chairman of the oblast Executive Committee (executive power). Since 1991, CPSU lost all the power, and the head of the Oblast administration, and eventually, the governor was appointed/elected alongside elected regional parliament.

The Charter of Kostroma Oblast is the fundamental law of the region. The Legislative Assembly of Kostroma Oblast is the province's standing legislative (representative) body. The Legislative Assembly exercises its authority by passing laws, resolutions, and other legal acts and by supervising the implementation and observance of the laws and other legal acts passed by it. The highest executive body is the Oblast Government, which includes territorial executive bodies such as district administrations, committees, and commissions that facilitate development and run the day-to-day matters of the province. The Oblast administration supports the activities of the Governor who is the highest official and acts as guarantor of the observance of the oblast Charter under the Constitution of Russia.

Viktor Shershunov was Governor from 1997 until his death in a car crash on September 20, 2007, at which point Igor Slyunyayev became the new Governor until 2012 when Sergey Sitnikov became the current incumbent.

The largest number of votes in the regional electoral district was received by the Kostroma Oblast branch of the United Russia party - 113,962 or 49.94%, the Communist Party of the Russian Federation - 44,776 or 19.62%, the Liberal Democratic Party of Russia - 33,043 or 14.48%, A Just Russia - 28,912 or 12.67%.

== Economy ==
=== Transportation ===
The oblast is bound to other Russian regions by roads, railroads (6–7 hours from Moscow) and air routes. Kostroma Airport serves to let people fly regularly inside Oblast and irregularly to Moscow.

== Demographics ==
Population: 580,976 (2021 census); 667,562 (2010 census); 736,641 (2002 census); 809,882 (1989 Soviet census).

Historical population
Year	Pop.	±%
1897	1,387,015	—
1926	811,619	−41.5%
1959	921,945	+13.6%
1970	870,575	−5.6%
1979	803,870	−7.7%
1989	809,882	+0.7%
2002	736,641	−9.0%
2010	667,562	−9.4%
2021	580,976	−13.0%
2025	560,758	−3.5%
Source: Census data, estimate

Vital statistics for 2024:

- Births: 4,156 (7.4 per 1,000)
- Deaths: 9,391 (16.7 per 1,000)

Total fertility rate (2024):
1.47 children per woman

Life expectancy (2021):
Total — 68.78 years (male — 64.07, female — 73.50)

Ethnic composition (2010):

- Russians - 96.6%
- Ukrainians - 0.9%
- Others - 2.5%
- 23,194 people were registered from administrative databases, and could not declare an ethnicity. It is estimated that the proportion of ethnicities in this group is the same as that of the declared group.

=== Religion ===
Religion in Kostroma Oblast as of 2012 (Sreda Arena Atlas)
Russian Orthodoxy	53.8%
Other Orthodox	1.8%
Other Christians	5.2%
Islam	0.6%
Rodnovery and other native faiths	0.8%
Spiritual but not religious	24.8%
Atheism and irreligion	8.6%
Other and undeclared	4.4%

Christianity is the largest religion in Kostroma Oblast. According to a 2012 survey 53.8% of the population of Kostroma Oblast adheres to the Russian Orthodox Church, 5% are unaffiliated generic Christians, 1% are Orthodox Christian believers who don't belong to church or are members of non-Russian Orthodox churches, and 1% of the population are adherents of the Slavic native faith (Rodnovery). In addition, 25% of the population declares to be "spiritual but not religious", 9% is atheist, and 5.2% follows other religions or did not give an answer to the question.

== See also ==
- List of Chairmen of the Kostroma Oblast Duma

== Sources ==
- Костромская областная Дума. Закон №300-4-ЗКО от 24 апреля 2008 г. «Устав Костромской области», в ред. Закона №464-4-ЗКО от 13 апреля 2009 г. «О внесении поправок в Устав Костромской области». Вступил в силу по истечении десяти дней после дня официального публикования. Опубликован: "СП — нормативные документы", №66 (1314), 30 апреля 2008 г. (Kostroma Oblast Duma. Law #300-4-ZKO of April 24, 2008 Charter of Kostroma Oblast, as amended by the Law #464-4-ZKO of April 13, 2009 On Amending the Charter of Kostroma Oblast. Effective as of the date ten days after the official publication date.).
