= Kostroma Oblast Duma =

Regional parliament of Kostroma Oblast, Russia

Kostroma Oblast Duma Костромская областная дума
- 7th legislature

Type
- Type: Unicameral

Leadership
- Chairman: Aleksey Anokhin, United Russia since 7 October 2015

Structure
- Seats: 35
- Political groups: United Russia (26) SRZP (3); CPRF (2); LDPR (2); RPPSJ (1) New People (1)

Elections
- Voting system: Mixed
- First election: 13 March 1994
- Last election: 12-14 September 2025
- Next election: 2030

Meeting place
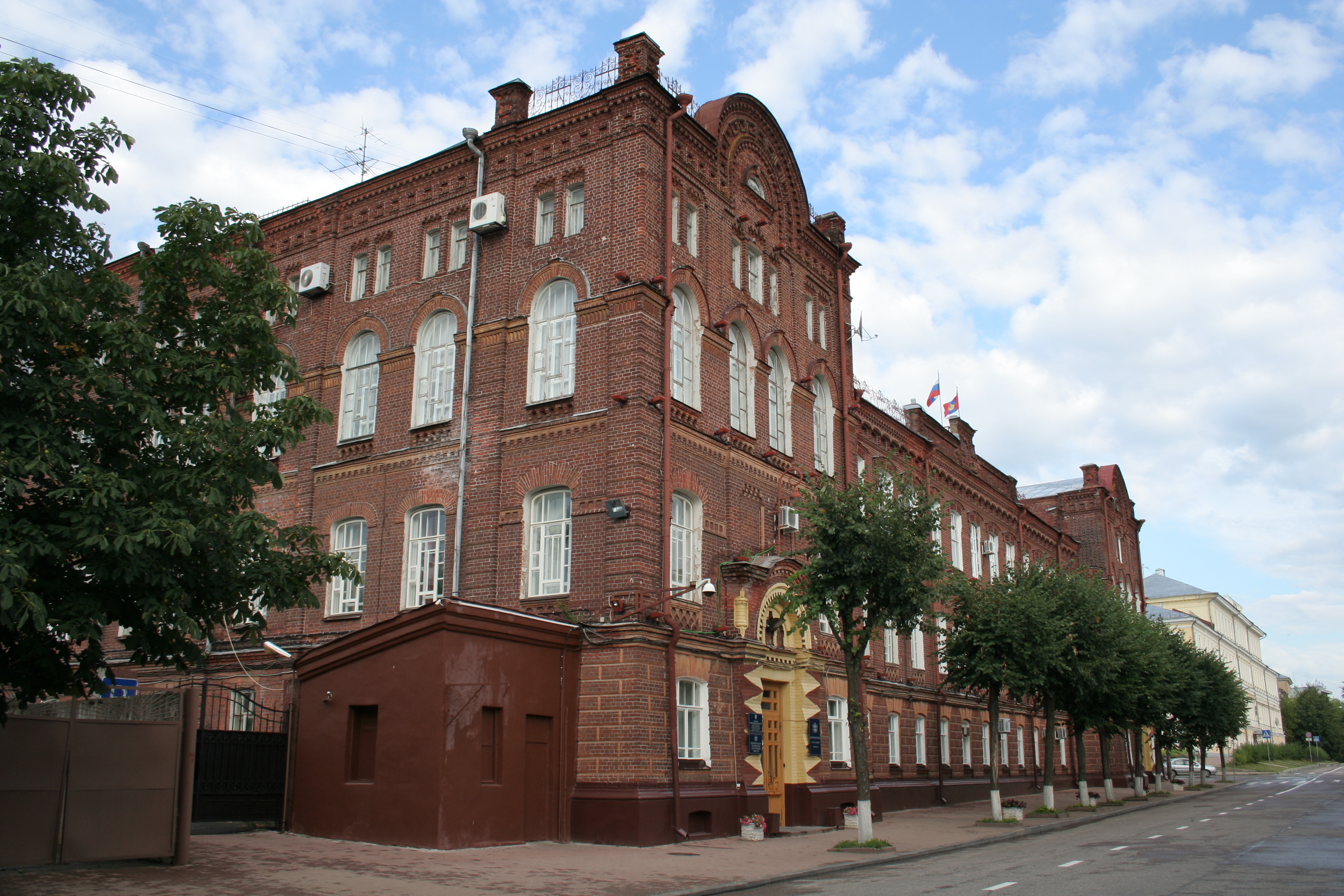
- 2 Soviet Square, Kostroma

Website
- kosoblduma.ru

The Kostroma Oblast Duma (Russian: Костромская областная дума, romanized: Kostromskaya oblastnaya duma) is the regional parliament of Kostroma Oblast, a federal subject of Russia. A total of 35 deputies are elected for five-year terms.

== Elections ==
=== 2005 ===
Party	Seats
United Russia	14
Communist Party of the Russian Federation	5
Agrarian Party of Russia	4
Rodina	2
Liberal Democratic Party of Russia	2
Russian Party of Life	1

=== 2010 ===
Party	Seats
United Russia	26
Communist Party of the Russian Federation	4
SRZP	3
Liberal Democratic Party of Russia	2

=== 2015 ===
Party	Seats
United Russia	27
Communist Party of the Russian Federation	3
SRZP	2
Liberal Democratic Party of Russia	1

=== 2020 ===
Party	Seats
United Russia	24
SRZP	2
Communist Party of the Russian Federation	2
Party of Social Protection	2
Liberal Democratic Party of Russia	1
Russian Party of Pensioners for Social Justice	1
Yabloko	1
New People	1
Independent	1

=== 2025 ===
Party	Seats
United Russia	26
SRZP	3
Liberal Democratic Party of Russia	2
Communist Party of the Russian Federation	2
New People	1
Russian Party of Pensioners for Social Justice	1
