= Government of Russia =

Government of the Russian Federation
- Правительство Российской Федерации
- Federal government

Overview
- Established: 25 December 1992; 33 years ago
- State: Russia
- Leader: Prime Minister
- Appointed by: President (after approval by the State Duma and consultations with the Federation Council)
- Main organ: Council of Ministers (predecessor)
- Ministries: 21
- Responsible to: State Duma; President
- Headquarters: White House, Moscow
- Website: government.ru

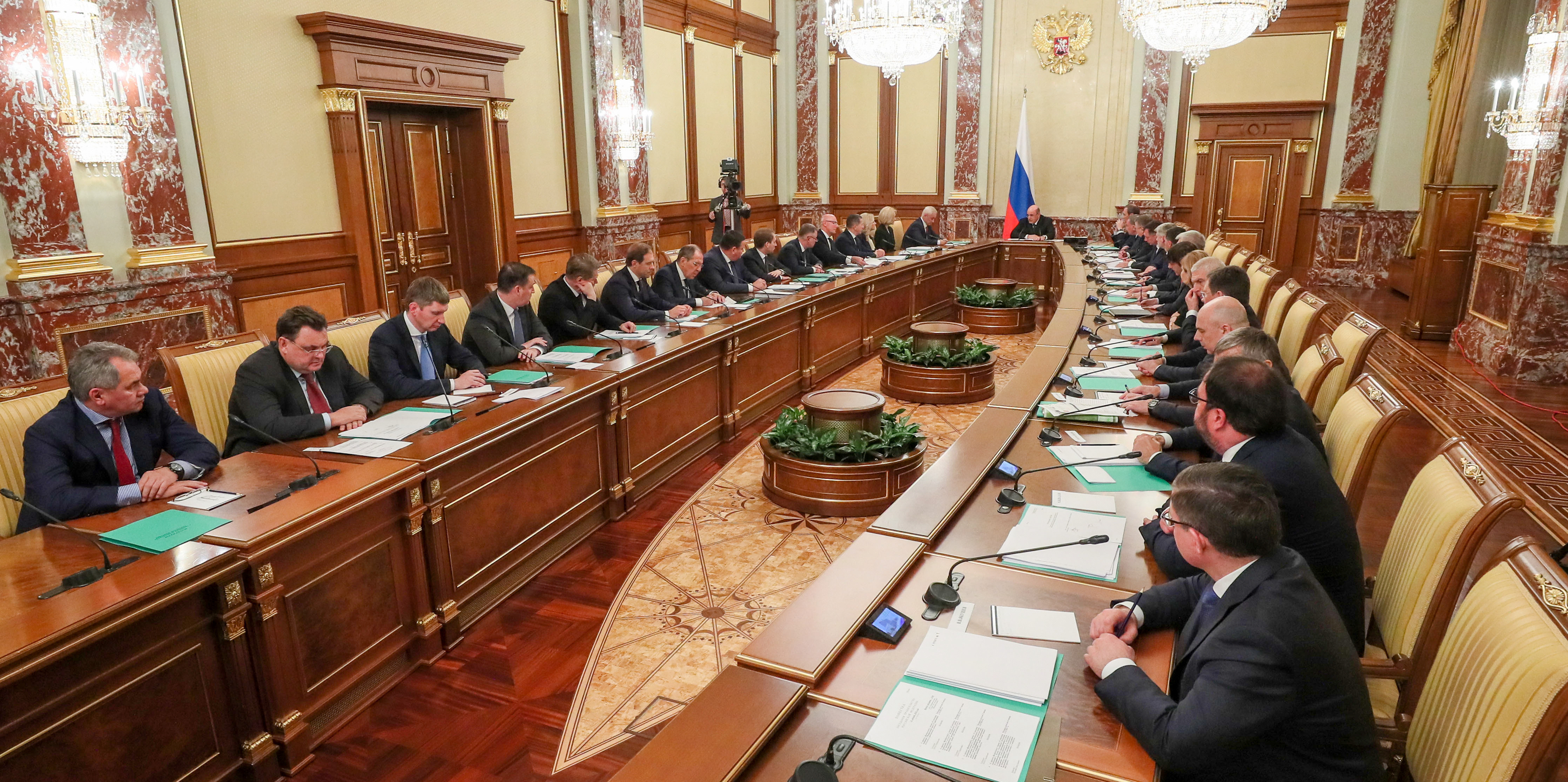
Meeting of the government of Russia in the meeting room at the White House

The government of Russia (Note: Russian: Правительство России, romanized: Pravitel'stvo Rossii) or fully titled the Government of the Russian Federation (Note: Russian: Правительство Российской Федерации, romanized: Pravitelstvo Rossiyskoy Federatsii) is the highest federal executive governmental body of the Russian Federation. It is accountable to the president of the Russian Federation and controlled by the State Duma.

The status and procedure of its activities are determined by chapter 6 of the Constitution of the Russian Federation and the provisions of the federal constitutional law "On the Government of the Russian Federation". The Government's terms of reference include the development and enforcement of the federal budget and the implementation of socially oriented government policies in various cultural areas of Russian society. Although the Government of the Russian Federation does not adopt laws, its responsibilities include issuing federal by-laws (resolutions) based on federal laws passed by the Federal Assembly.

According to the 1991 amendment to the 1978 constitution, the president of Russia was the head of the executive branch and headed the Council of Ministers of Russia. According to the current 1993 constitution, the president is not a part of the government of Russia, which exercises executive power. However, the president appoints the prime minister.

On 15 January 2020, Medvedev's second government resigned after the Russian President's address to the Federal Assembly and served until the new government was approved.

On 21 January 2020, Mishustin's First government was approved.

On 7 May 2024, after the inauguration of the president of the Russian Federation, the entire government resigned.

On 10 May 2024, the State Duma approved Mishustin's candidacy for the post of Prime Minister proposed by the president.

On 14 May 2024, Mishustin's second government was approved.

== History ==
The large body was preceded by the government of the Soviet Union. The government's structure has undergone several significant changes since the Russian Federation emerged from 1991 to 1992. In the initial years, many government bodies, primarily the different ministries, underwent massive reorganization as the old Soviet governing networks were adapted to the new state. Many reshuffles and renamings occurred.

On 28 November 1991, the President of the RSFSR Boris Yeltsin signed presidential decree No.242 "On the reorganization of the government bodies of the RSFSR". Yeltsin officially declared the end of the Soviet Union and became the President of the Russian Federation. Yeltsin was a reformer and promised Western-styled democracy.

The new Russian Constitution was adopted in 1993. It gained legitimacy through its bicameral legislature, an independent judiciary, the position of the president and the prime minister, and democratic features. These democratic features included competitive multi-party elections, separation of powers, federalism, and protection of civil liberties.

In 1999, Yeltsin appointed Vladimir Putin the Prime Minister. Later that year, Yeltsin resigned from the presidency, and Putin took over as the acting president. In its first round, Putin won the 2000 Russian presidential election, gaining 53.44% of the vote.

The most recent change took place on 14 May 2024, when President Vladimir Putin signed a presidential decree on forming Mikhail Mishustin's Second Cabinet.

== Responsibilities and power ==
The Government is the subject of the 6th chapter of the Constitution of the Russian Federation. According to the constitution, the government of the Russian Federation must:

1. Draft and submit the federal budget to the State Duma; ensure the implementation of the budget and report on its implementation to the State Duma;
2. Ensure the implementation of a uniform financial, credit and monetary policy in the Russian Federation;
3. Ensure the implementation of a uniform state policy in the areas of culture, science, education, health protection, social security and ecology;
4. Manage federal property;
5. Adopt measures to ensure the country's defense, state security, and the implementation of the foreign policy of the Russian Federation;
6. Implement measures to ensure the rule of law, human rights and freedoms, the protection of property and public order, and crime control;
7. Exercise any other powers vested in it by the Constitution of the Russian Federation, federal laws, and presidential decrees.

The government issues its acts in the way of decisions (Russian: Постановления) and orders (Russian: Распоряжения). These must not contradict the constitution, federal constitutional laws, federal laws, and Presidential decrees, and are signed by the Prime Minister.

The Government also assists the Prime Minister in faithfully carrying out the country's domestic and foreign policy as determined by the President.

== Composition of the Government and federal agencies ==
The Government of the Russian Federation consists of the Chairman of the Government of the Russian Federation, Deputy Chairmen of the Government of the Russian Federation and federal ministers.

The Chairman of the Government of the Russian Federation is appointed by the President with the consent of the State Duma. In case of a three-fold rejection by the State Duma of the submitted candidacy, the President of the Russian Federation has the right to dissolve the Duma and independently appoint the Chairman of the Government.

The structure of the federal executive authorities, as well as the composition of the Government, is approved by presidential decree on the basis of a proposal from the Chairman of the Government of the Russian Federation, sent within one week after his appointment in accordance with Article 112 of the Constitution of the Russian Federation.

The President may decide at any time to dismiss the Government. After each election of the President of the Russian Federation, the Government resigns its powers.

As a result of the administrative reform of 2003–2005, the status and distribution of functions between federal ministries, federal services and federal agencies were clarified. Thus, federal ministries are responsible for the development and implementation of state policy in their fields and can issue regulatory legal acts. Federal services carry out control and supervision. Federal agencies are responsible for managing property and providing services. For example, Rosarchiv is responsible for the preservation and access to archival documents.

In 2020, amendments were adopted to the Constitution of the Russian Federation, which also relate to the principles of formation and the field of activity of the Government of the Russian Federation.

== Current Cabinet ==
Portfolio	Minister	Took office	Left office	Party
Prime Minister	Mikhail Mishustin	14 May 2024	Incumbent	Independent
First Deputy Prime Minister	Denis Manturov	14 May 2024	Incumbent	Independent
Deputy Prime Minister of Russia; Chief of Staff for the Government of Russia	Dmitry Grigorenko	14 May 2024	Incumbent	Independent
Deputy Prime Minister – Presidential Envoy to the Far Eastern Federal District	Yury Trutnev	14 May 2024	Incumbent	United Russia
Deputy Prime Minister for Agro-Industrial Complex, Natural Resources and Ecology	Dmitry Patrushev	14 May 2024	Incumbent	Independent
Deputy Prime Minister for Eurasian Integration, cooperation with the CIS, BRICS, G20 and International Events	Alexey Overchuk	14 May 2024	Incumbent	Independent
Deputy Prime Minister for Fuel–Energy Complex and Economy	Alexander Novak	14 May 2024	Incumbent	United Russia
Deputy Prime Minister for Construction and Regional Policy	Marat Khusnullin	14 May 2024	Incumbent	Independent
Deputy Prime Minister for Social Policy	Tatyana Golikova	14 May 2024	Incumbent	United Russia
Deputy Prime Minister for Tourism, Sport, Culture and Communications	Dmitry Chernyshenko	14 May 2024	Incumbent	Independent
Deputy Prime Minister for Transport	Vitaly Savelyev	14 May 2024	Incumbent	United Russia
Minister of Agriculture	Oksana Lut	14 May 2024	Incumbent	Independent
Minister of Digital Development, Communications and Mass Media	Maksut Shadayev	14 May 2024	Incumbent	Independent
Minister of Construction, Housing and Utilities	Irek Faizullin	14 May 2024	Incumbent	Independent
Minister of Culture	Olga Lyubimova	14 May 2024	Incumbent	Independent
Minister of Defence	Andrey Belousov	14 May 2024	Incumbent	Independent
Minister for the Development of the Russian Far East and Arctic	Aleksey Chekunkov	14 May 2024	Incumbent	Independent
Minister of Economic Development	Maxim Reshetnikov	14 May 2024	Incumbent	United Russia
Minister of Education	Sergey Kravtsov	14 May 2024	Incumbent	Independent
Minister of Emergency Situations	Aleksandr Kurenkov	14 May 2024	Incumbent	Independent
Minister of Energy	Sergey Tsivilyov	14 May 2024	Incumbent	United Russia
Minister of Finance	Anton Siluanov	14 May 2024	Incumbent	United Russia
Minister of Foreign Affairs	Sergey Lavrov	14 May 2024	Incumbent	United Russia
Minister of Health	Mikhail Murashko	14 May 2024	Incumbent	Independent
Minister of Industry and Trade	Anton Alikhanov	14 May 2024	Incumbent	United Russia
Minister of Internal Affairs	Vladimir Kolokoltsev	14 May 2024	Incumbent	Independent
Minister of Justice	Konstantin Chuychenko	14 May 2024	Incumbent	United Russia
Minister of Labour and Social Protection	Anton Kotyakov	14 May 2024	Incumbent	Independent
Minister of Natural Resources and Ecology	Alexander Kozlov	14 May 2024	Incumbent	United Russia
Minister of Science and Higher Education	Valery Falkov	14 May 2024	Incumbent	United Russia
Minister of Sport	Mikhail Degtyarev	14 May 2024	Incumbent	LDPR
Minister of Transport	Dmitry Yadrov	22 October 2026	Incumbent	United Russia

== Organizations under the Government ==
- Analytical Center under the Government of the Russian Federation
- Institute of Legislation and Comparative Law under the Government of the Russian Federation
- Information Telegraphic Agency of Russia (FSUE)
- M. V. Lomonosov Moscow State University
- National Research University "Higher School of Economics"
- National Research Center "Kurchatov Institute"
- Russian Academy of Painting, Sculpture and Architecture Ilya Glazunov
- St. Petersburg State University
- Financial University under the Government of the Russian Federation
- Russian Presidential Academy of National Economy and Public Administration
- National Research Center "Zhukovsky Institute"
- S.S.Alekseev Research Center for Private Law under the President of the Russian Federation
- Artek International Children's Center
- All-Russian Children's Center "Orlyonok"
- All-Russian children's center "Smena"
- All-Russian Children's Center "Ocean"

The official press organ of the Russian government is Rossiyskaya Gazeta. On 28 December 1999, the official server of the Government of the Russian Federation was opened at www.правительство.рф (or www.government.gov.ru ).

== State non-budgetary funds ==
The Government of the Russian Federation, on behalf of the Russian Federation, exercises the functions and powers of the owner (founder) of two non-budgetary funds:

- Federal Compulsory Medical Insurance Fund
- Pension and Social Insurance Fund of the Russian Federation

== Lists of ministers ==
- List of prime ministers
- List of first deputy prime ministers
- List of deputy prime ministers
- List of defence ministers
- List of economy ministers
- List of finance ministers
- List of justice ministers
- List of foreign ministers
- List of interior ministers
- List of emergency ministers
- List of health ministers
- List of culture ministers
- List of energy ministers
- List of environmental ministers

== See also ==
- Government of the Russian Soviet Federative Socialist Republic
- Government of the Soviet Union
- List of heads of government of Russia
- Russia under Vladimir Putin
- Security Council of Russia

== Notes ==
Previous: Government of the Soviet Union; 1922–1991	Government ruling Russia proper 1991–present	Next: —
Previous: Representative for the Government of the Soviet Union in the United Nations; 1945–1991	Representative for the Russian Federation in the United Nations; 1991–present	Next: —
