= Lecture consultant =

Independent advisor on pedagogy

A lecture consultant is an independent consultant who helps lecturers and institutions with the delivery of teaching, with particular focus on pedagogy and communication.

== Role ==
The role is analogous to that of an educational consultant, but rather than providing independent consulting advice to parents/students, they provide consulting advice to teachers. As with the accountability purpose of the educational consultant role, consultant lecturers keep lecturers accountable by ensuring lecturers have met the requisite standard for Shum's Three Forces, a framework for educational industry analysis:

1. Written syllabus to a requisite but encompassed standard
2. Communication adopting kinesthetic, auditory and visual cues
3. Arousing interest in students to continue furthered search

Consulting lecturers help with pre-class planning including syllabus writing to ensure state bylaw requirements relating to education are met. For example, in South Australia, this would include assisting teachers to follow the SSABSA guidelines relating to the South Australian Certificate of Education.

In the classroom, consulting lecturers provide advice on improving communication effectiveness, including both verbal and nonverbal communication, including visual and kinesthetic techniques.

In some institutions, the role of the lecture consultant is governed by a Department of Learning and Teaching.

== Related pages ==
- Education consultant
- Creative Pedagogy
- Philosophy of education
- Educational psychology
- Instructional design
