= Young Pioneer camp =

State-sponsored youth camps for in many communist countries

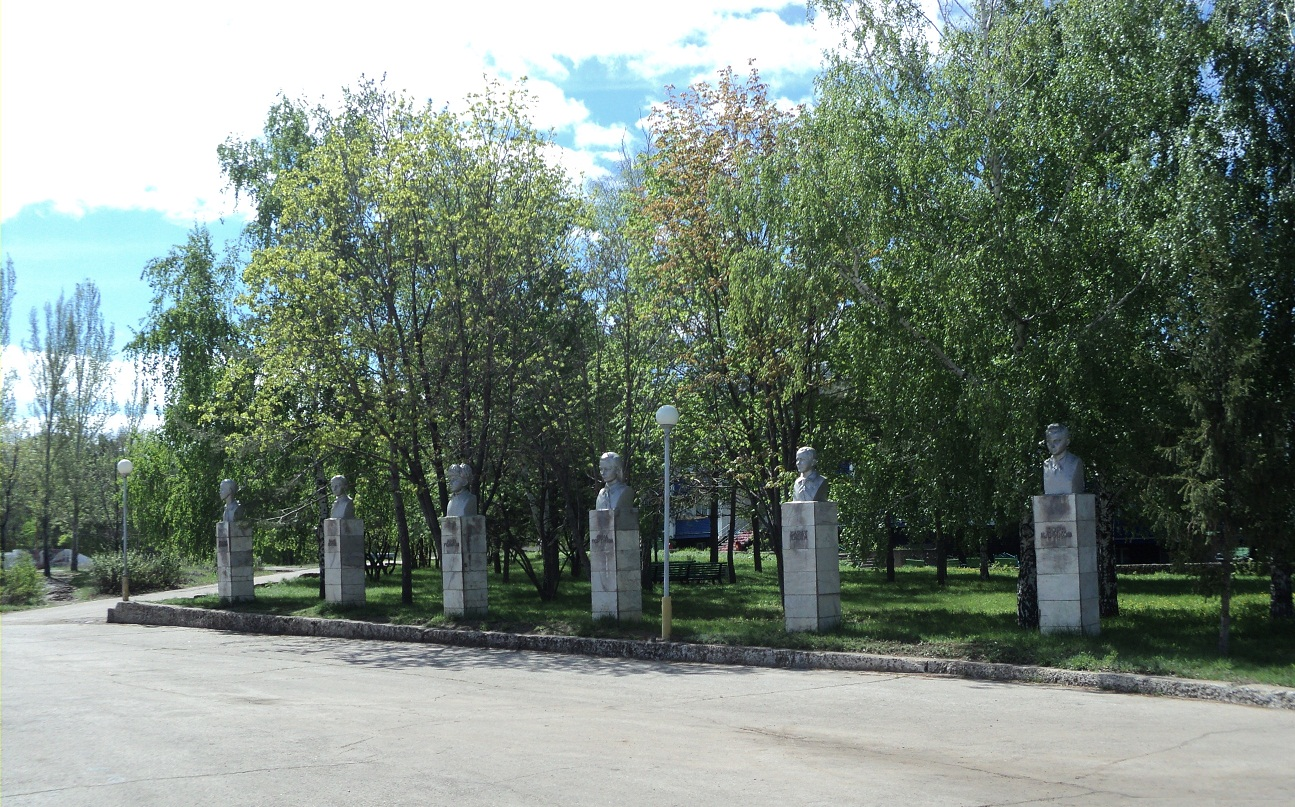
Young Pioneer camp "Alye Parusa". Monument of the Pioneers to heroes. (Russia, city Togliatti)

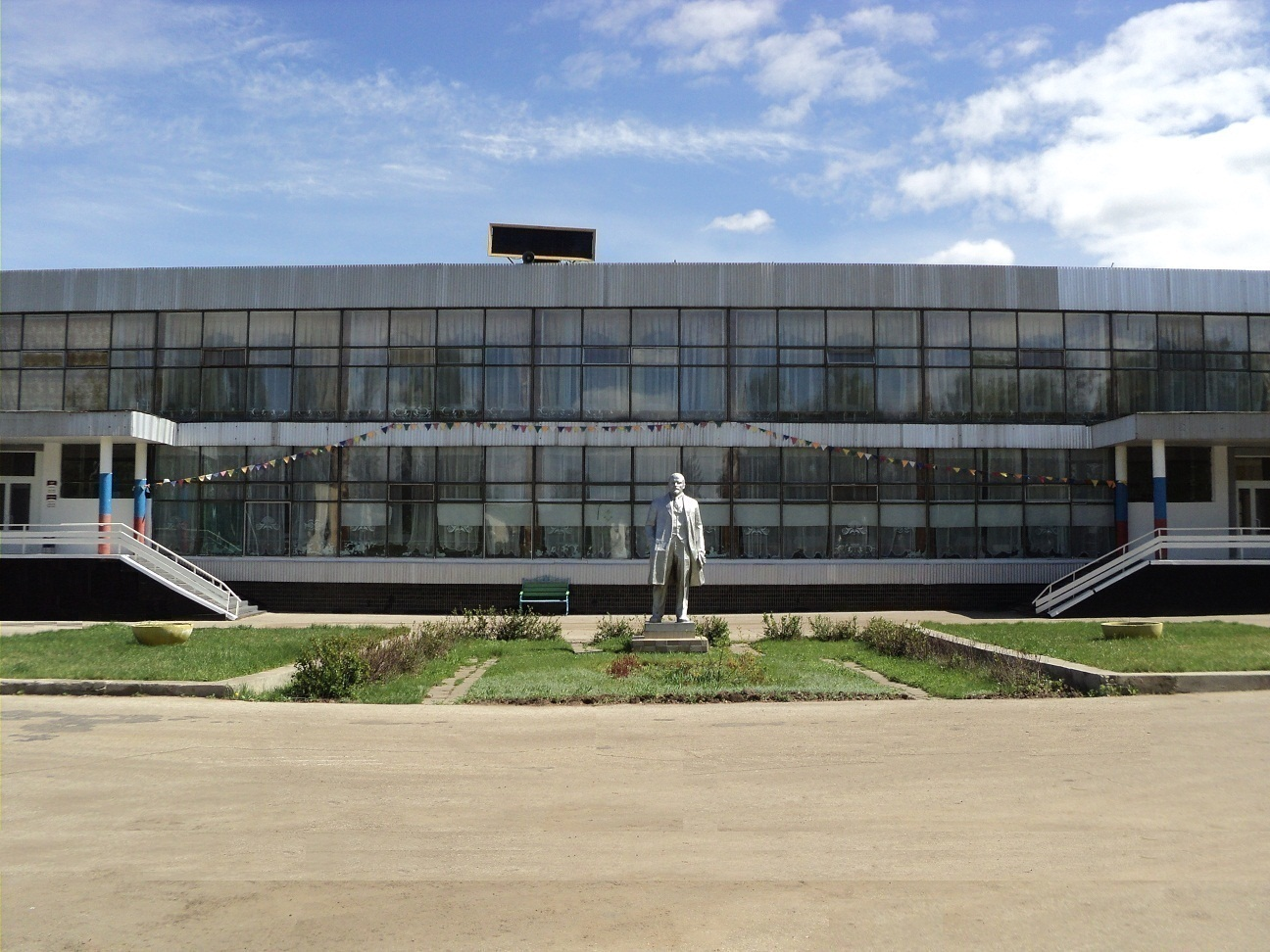
Young Pioneer camp "Alye Parusa". Dining room, in the Centre of the monument to founder USSR Vladimir Lenin. (Russia, city Togliatti)

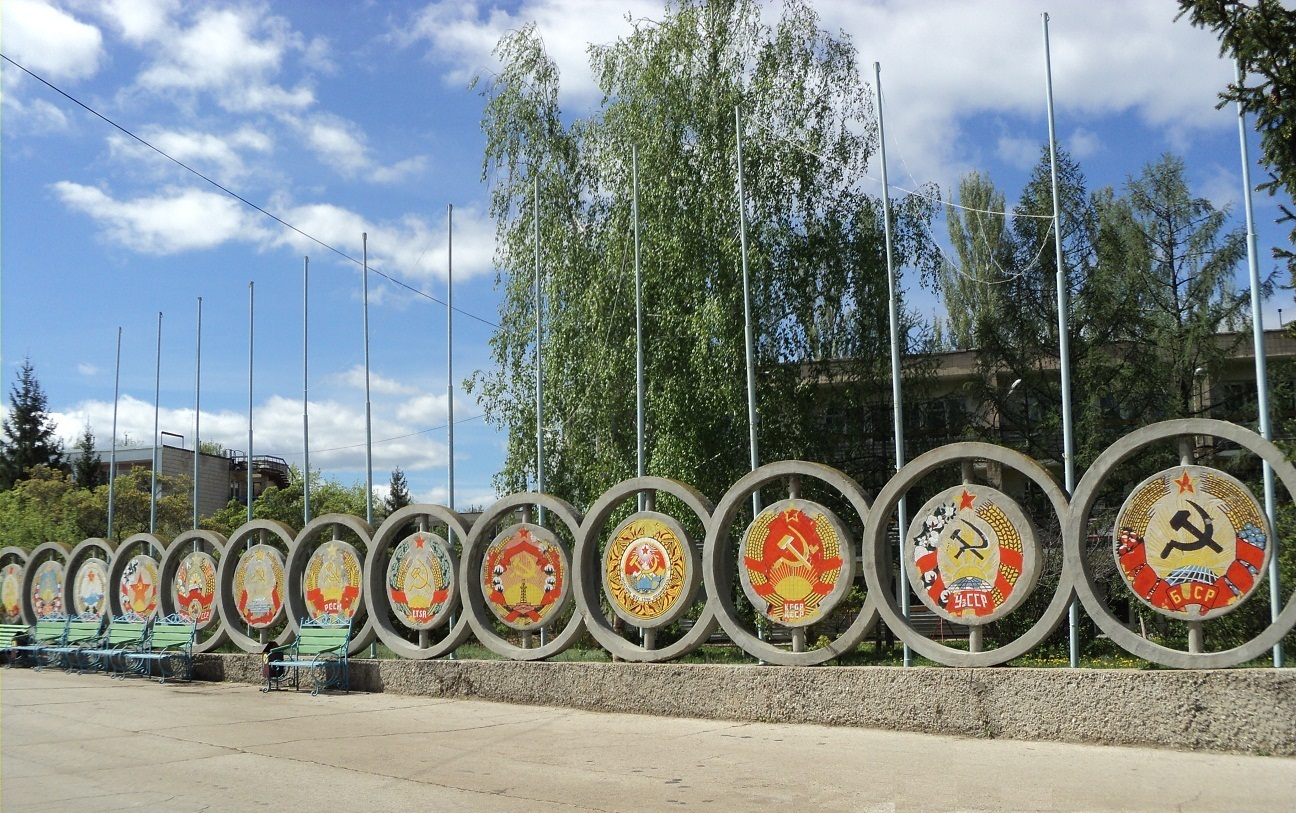
Young Pioneer camp "Alye Parusa". Coats of arms and flags of the Soviet republics USSR. (Russia, city Togliatti)

Young Pioneer camp (Russian: Пионерский лагерь) was the name for the vacation or summer camps of Young Pioneers. In the 20th century these camps existed in many socialist countries, particularly in the Soviet Union.

The Young Pioneer camps of the Soviet Union were the place of vacation for children from the Young Pioneer organization of the Soviet Union during summer and winter holidays.

== History ==
The first All-Union Young Pioneer camp, Artek was formed on June 16, 1925. The Young Pioneer camp phenomenon grew in popularity and in 1973 approximately forty thousand Young Pioneer camps existed in the USSR. In that year, approximately 9,300,000 children had vacations in these camps. There were different types of camps: sanitation camps, sports camps, tourist camps, thematic camps (for young technicians, young naturalists, young geologists and children of other potential careers). Generally speaking if parents wanted their child or children to go to one of these Young Pioneer camps, they had to pay a fee to apply for accommodation in the camp. However, typically the state organization where the parent worked "sponsored" the child by allotting the worker's child a place in the camp free of charge to the parent or parents as an incident to the parent's employment.

The main Young Pioneer camps of the Soviet Union were All-Union Young Pioneer camp Artek (near Gurzuf), republican camps: Orlyonok (near Tuapse, Russian SFSR, opened in 1960), Okean (near Vladivostok, Russian SFSR, opened in 1983), Molodaya Gvardiya camp (near Odessa, Ukrainian SSR) and Zubryonok (in Minsk Oblast, Byelorussian SSR). It was very difficult to apply for accommodation to the main camps, especially to Artek, as they were very popular.

Western children also sometimes attended Soviet Young Pioneer camps, including children from Canada in the 1970s.

In East Germany the Ernst Thälmann Pioneer Organisation built a pioneer camp (known as a "pioneer republic") in 1952 at Werbellinsee north-east of Berlin. It was based on the Artek camp. It was considered a privilege to be chosen to go to this camp.

== See also ==
- Young Pioneer organization of the Soviet Union
- Ernst Thälmann Pioneer Organisation
- Pioneers Palace
