= Igor Ivanov (educationist) =

Soviet pedagogue, founder of the Communard Movement

Igor Petrovich Ivanov
- Born: 5 November 1923; Batumi, Georgian SSR, Soviet Union
- Died: 9 August 1992 (aged 68); Saint Petersburg, Russia
- Citizenship: USSR
- Education: Leningrad State University
- Known for: Communard movement in Soviet Russia, collective creative pedagogy
- Scientific career
- Workplaces: Herzen Pedagogical State University

Igor Petrovich Ivanov (Russian: Игорь Петрович Иванов) (5 November 1923 – 9 August 1992) was a Soviet pedagogue, initiator and founder of the "social-pedagogical youth movement" known in Russia as the Communard movement. He was a member of the Soviet Academy of Pedagogy, full professor of the Herzen Pedagogical State University, author of several books, laureate of the Makarenko Prize named after early Soviet educator Anton Makarenko. Russian scholars consider Ivanov to be a creator of the "Communard methodology" or, as the author himself called it, the Collective Creative Deeds methodology (commonly referred to as Metodologiya Kollektivnich Tvorcheskich del (KTD) in Russian pedagogical literature), founder of the "pedagogy of partnership", which is also named "collective creative pedagogy" and "pedagogy of social creativity". Ivanov's scholarly works continued the development of Creative Pedagogy.

Igor Ivanov laid foundation for the Communard movement in the mid-1950s in Leningrad by gathering young teachers and instructors from several schools into a creative group called Union of Enthusiasts (Soyuz Entuziastov). In this Union, during the years of 1956-1958, Ivanov developed and began to implement his ideas concerning the involvement of teenagers into a prototype of youth social organization which would not impose strict dogmatic rules on its participants. This was in contrast to Communists' practice at that time when most social activities in post-World War II Soviet schools were under the auspices of the pro-communist Pioneer organization. Yet, the death of Stalin in 1953 and the ascension of Nikita Khrushchev to power in 1955 led to certain liberalization of Soviet society. And Ivanov's actions were strictly in context of those changes.

In 1959, Union of Enthusiasts led by Igor Ivanov and his close colleguages including Ludmila Borisova and Faina Shapiro gave birth to an organization of high-school students - Commune of Frunze High Schoolers (Kommuna Yunych Frunzentsov), named so after the Frunze - Russian Civil war hero, whose name was also on the precinct in Leningrad, where Commune was located. In the core of this Commune was an active, creative, organizational pedagogical mechanism developed by Ivanov. The organization had a voluntary membership and promoted, yet in unobtrusive and implicit manner, the author's Collective Creative Deeds methodology. The main idea behind it was that participants (communards), both children and adult instructors, could choose their own actions, participate in cooperative and creative activities, and make deeds which are sincere care about the world around and the development of each and every one, chivalrous service to the good, creative enthusiasm, democratism, partnership, cheerful mood and spirit of freedom. In 1962, the ideas implemented in the Frunze commune were seeded in Orlyonok, one of the major Pioneer camps, and the Orlyonok participants of that year spread ideas about Collective Creative Deeds to many other regions of the country creating numerous school and college-based pedagogical clubs and communes. In one year, the popularity grew so massive that in the summer of 1963 the Communard movement culminated in a first, all-Soviet Young Communard convention in Orlyonok. In part, the popularity of the Communard movement was due to initial support from Komsomolskaya Pravda, the official newspaper of Communist Union of Youth, especially from Simon Soloveychik, who worked in the 1960s in the newspaper and was assigned to display the Communard movement. As political climate changed when Nikita Khrushchev was replaced by Leonid Brezhnev in 1964, the Communard movement as an individual trend could not be supported by Komsomol any longer. In 1965-1966, many communes were integrated into Pioneer and Komsomol local organizations and could not act independent of the directions from Communist party. While opinions of Russian pedagogues on the implementation of the Communard clubs in then Soviet education system vary over a broad range, most scholars agree on the positive effect of the ideas behind the movement on the development of free thinking, creativity and social adaptability in Soviet teenagers.

The Ivanov's Collective Creative Deeds methodology was not only the foundation for the youth Communard movement. Ivanov went on to develop his ideas into "pedagogy of cooperative care" which he described in several comprehensive publications. In 1960-1970, Ivanov has performed most of the practical work in collaboration with his own group of students in Makarenko Commune, a union of college students in Herzen University. One of the Ivanov's known books - "Encyclopedia of Collective Creative Deeds" is still popular among the pedagogical communities of Russia. It has promoted examples for hundreds of school teachers on how to conduct education through creative activities such as role playing, science-fiction projects, quiz tournaments, relay races, pen pal correspondence and many other activities which involved collaborative and interactive elements for participants.

In 1998 in Saint-Petersburg a book by his wife Lubov Ivanova "Future in the present – life and work of Igor Petrovich Ivanov" was published, timed to All-Russian congress of the followers of Igor Ivanov "Education and school at the turn of the 21st century".
