= Orlyonok =

State-run youth camp near Tuapse, Krasnodar Krai, Russia

The Russian Children's Center "Orlyonok" (Russian: Орлёнок, lit. 'eaglet') is a federal state all-year camp for children aged 11–16 (school grades 6 through 10). It is located in the Southern Federal District of Russia, on the eastern shore of the Black Sea, Krasnodar Krai, 45 kilometers north-west from Tuapse. Orlyonok is officially registered as the Federal State Education Organization.

Prior to 1991, its full name was USSR Pioneer Camp "Orlyonok", and it was officially part of the Young Pioneer organization of the Soviet Union. Orlyonok received the Order of the Badge of Honour from the Komsomol (abbreviation of Communist Union of Youth) organization, a decoration awarded for outstanding social and civil accomplishments.

Orlyonok welcomes children from all regions of Russia and other countries, regardless of their social strata or affiliation. During the combined summer/spring season it accepts up to 3,500 children, in the fall/winter season – up to 1,200; the total number of children that it receives annually is about 20,000 children of both genders. Depending on the season, the duration of a stay varies between 21 and 30 days respectively.

== Origins of the name ==
It is generally believed that the Orlyonok's name was taken from the title of a popular Young Pioneer song with the same name about a 16-year-old Red Army soldier about to be executed by enemies during the Russian Civil War.

A statue named "Orlyonok" stands in the center of the camp, being part of the Memorial Plaza. It is similar to another statue with the same name in the city of Chelyabinsk.

== History ==
The Orlyonok Young Pioneer camp was established on July 12, 1960 by the decision of the Council of Ministers of the Russian SFSR (March 27, 1959). Similar to Artek, Orlyonok was intended for Russian children who were notable for excellent study, prize winners at various Student Olympiads, contests, or sports competitions, decorated or notable members of Komsomol or Young Pioneer organization activists.

In 1962 Orlyonok welcomed 50 representatives of the then-experimental Communard Movement, including children from the famous Leningrad Frunze Community organization (now dismissed) led by Igor Ivanov. During this time, Orlyonok acquired some of its laws and traditions and adopted what has become known as the creative team effort methodology.

After the successful experience of the previous year, in 1963 Orlyonok hosted the first all-USSR gathering of young communards.

In the beginning, the 1960 Orlyonok camp hosted 520 children, and by 1973 the annual attendance increased to nearly 17,000. By then Orlyonok had grown to an area of 3 square kilometers, with 60 buildings, including the dormitories, the "Young Pioneer Palace" (with a winter swimming pool filled with sea water, and a cinema), secondary school, medical building, Museum of Aircraft and Cosmonautics, astronomical observatory, sports stadium, playgrounds and a winter sports hall. There were more than 200 hobby groups of 50 different kinds, mostly in polytechnics, sports, and aesthetics. Orlyonok had its own passenger ship, 45 yachts, and many motor boats and rowboats.

In the early 1990s, when the Young Pioneer organization of the Soviet Union was dismantled, the camp attendance in Orlyonok was greatly decreased; however, attendance has increased since 2000, as the camp was nostalgically associated with the Young Pioneer camps of the past. It is believed that between the years 1960 and 2010 Orlyonok hosted over 800,000 children.

On July 12, 2010, Orlyonok celebrated their 50th anniversary. It welcomed guests from all over Russia and abroad, all ages and walks of life, whose life was connected with Orlyonok. The celebration culminated with a special concert and fireworks at the central stadium.

In 2011 Orlyonok hosted a delegation from UNESCO reviewing Orlyonok admission to the UNESCO Associated Schools Project Network. In 2012 Orlyonok was admitted to the UNESCO ASPNet.

On February 5, 2014, Orlyonok hosted the final part of the 2014 Winter Olympics torch relay. A relay torch was lit with the Olympic flame next to the Memorial Stone, from where it was carried throughout Orlyonok by 15 torchbearers covering a distance of approximately 3 kilometers.

In April 2025, the Institute for the Study of War (ISW) warned that Russia, then undertaking an invasion of Ukraine, planned to intensify during the summer of that year the deportation of Ukrainian children to its occupied and own territory, including to Orlyonok and also Artek. Children from Transnistria, a Russian-occupied territory of Moldova, had also been sent previously to Orlyonok, and also to Artek. According to the Moldovan NGO Promo-LEX, the participation of children from Transnistria in both camps is one of Russia's tools for the ideological transformation and militarization of these children, ensuring their loyalty to Russia.

== Notable visitors ==
- Yuri Alekseyevich Gagarin (1964) – Soviet cosmonaut, first human in space.
- Alexey Arkhipovich Leonov (1964, 1969, 1978) – Soviet cosmonaut, first human who conducted space walk.
- Vladimir Mikhaylovich Komarov (1964) – Soviet cosmonaut.
- Konstantin Petrovich Feoktistov (1964) – Soviet cosmonaut and space engineer.
- Aleksandra Nikolayevna Pakhmutova (1964, 1967, 1970, 1983) – Soviet and Russian composer.
- Nikolai Nikolaevich Dobronravov (1964, 1970, 1983) – Soviet and Russian poet.
- Dmitri Borisovich Kabalevski (1967) – Soviet music composer.
- Boris Vladimirovich Zakhoder (1968) – Soviet poet and children's writer.
- Yuri Vladimirovich Nikulin (1968, 1971) – Soviet and Russian actor and clown.
- Andrei Alexandrovich Mironov (1968) – Soviet theater and film actor.
- Sergey Vladimirovich Mikhalkov (1974) – Soviet and Russian children's writer, also the composer of the Russian anthem lyrics.
- Robert Ivanovich Rozhdestvensky (1974) – Soviet poet.
- Vasily Pavlovich Solovyov-Sedoi (1976) – Soviet classical composer
- Gianni Rodari (1979) – Italian writer and journalist.
- Vladimir Yakovlevich Shainsky (1982, 1983, 1985, 2005) – Soviet and Russian composer.
- Vladislav Aleksandrovich Tretiak (1982) – Soviet hockey goaltender.

== Camp description ==
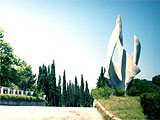
Orlyonok entrance

Orlyonok is really seven independent camps, Solnechnyi, Zvyozdnyi, Stremitel'nyi, Komsomolskiy, Shtormovoy, Dozornyi, Olimpiyskiy, located on the combined territory of more than 244 hectares. Four of the camps, Solnechnyi, Shtormovoy, Zvyozdnyi, Stremitel'nyi, are all-year while the rest close for winter. Every camp has extended facilities in addition to the sleeping accommodations.

The original names of the camps reflect their history and overall themes:

- Solnechnyi (Russian: Солнечный, English: "Solar") – main theme is "Adventure" and every child attending the camp works on a project that has to be completed during the stay. It is not just about the project itself, it is also about making and keeping friends and helping each other achieve success. As part of the program, children go hiking and learn basics of working together as a team.
- Zvyozdnyi (Russian: Звёздный, English: "Celestial") – themed after cosmos exploration popular in the 1970s, it is faithful to the theme of stars – space and astronomy; twice a year special programs are conducted under the auspice of the Yuri Gagarin Cosmonaut Training Center. The main theme of the camp is leadership, both in space exploration and on earth. It is believed that the name was suggested by the first person in space, Yuri Gagarin, when he visited Zvyozdnyi in November 1964.
- Stremitel'nyi (Russian: Стремительный, English: "Aspiring") – main theme of this camp is "I am a citizen of Russia" and during the camp children can "create" their own "Aspiring country" complete with cities (eaglet circles), specializing in various activities. Just like a real country, "Aspiring country" holds presidential elections, implements programs and establishes a country capital. Every summer Aspiring is hosting the Festival of Visual Arts, accepting creative children from Russia, and being true to the spirit of creativity.
- Komsomolskiy (Russian: Комсомольский, approximate English: "belonging to Komsomol") – from the very beginning was to be the school for future leaders. While staying at the camp children can choose from the multitude of programs offered, "The Image of the Leader", "How to work in a team," "How to organize work," "How to work with information," "Community Corner", etc.
- Shtormovoy (Russian: Штормовой, English: "Stormy") – entire camp not only the closest to the Black Sea, it resembles a ship, both architecturally and structurally. The building itself has a deck, a superstructure facing the sea, a stern, and its port side faces the center of Orlyonok. Maritime themes are throughout, even in the names: the crews, the cabins, galley, mess hall, etc. Life on board is organized in accordance with naval traditions.
- Dozornyi (Russian: Дозорный, approximate English: "Patrolling") – themed after the Border Guard Service of Russia troops, it was designed and built to resemble one of the border posts while being a summer camp at the same time. Children who attend the Border Guard Academy learn basics of guarding country borders, terrain navigation, outdoor camping and survival, etc. The camp is modeled to be its own border post with a strict schedule, discipline, daily duties.
- Olimpiyskiy (Russian: Олимпийский, English: "Olympic") – the youngest of the camps, its themes are sport, promoting healthy lifestyle and cultural heritage of the Olympics. Approaching XXII Olympic Winter Games in nearby Sochi also inspired all the programs that this camp offers. Arriving children enter "Olympic House" where they learn about the history of the Olympic Games and Olympic Movement in Russia and abroad, legendary sportsmen and sportswomen, precepts of the sportsmanship, etc.

In addition to the seven camps, Orlyonok has its own hospital, auto park, hotel, radio and TV center, various administrative buildings, museum of aviation and cosmonautics, observatory. The seaside boardwalk that runs from the Stormovoy camp to the Solnechnyi camp is part of what is considered the central part of Orlyonok that includes Memorial Plaza with the statue of Orlyonok, "Palace of Culture and Sport" (Russian: ДКС, Дом Культуры и Спорта) that is connected to the library called "Pharmacy for the Soul" and is adjacent to the stadium "Youth".

A Memorial Stone commemorating the founding of the camp on July 12, 1960 stands close to the Solnechnyi camp. On it there is a carved five-line stanza that reads (approximate translation):

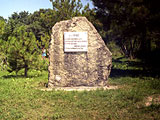
Orlyonok Memorial Stone

12.VII.1960
This date is carved on stone
Remember friend, Here are the Eaglets
Stood in formation
The flags were flown
From hence began the Camp

There is no single official Orlyonok uniform, instead, there are uniforms for different camps. Also, while not strictly enforced, eaglets, while at the camp, wear colored neckerchiefs, which have different color combinations for different camps.

== Orlyonok culture ==
Orlyonok has its own history and traditions, one of the most important among them – respect for people, their work, their personality, and experience ... This requires future "Eaglets" to have a certain culture of communication and interaction with peers and adults. Furthermore, almost everything is planned and done by the children themselves, as part of joint activities performed together with teachers and peers. For example, self-help is the rule of the day: from simple things like making one's bed in the morning and self-care, to collectively serving a rotating duty around the camp and in the dining rooms.

Though having a lot in common with the world-wide Scouts youth, the Eaglets' culture has a few notable points distinguishing them, one of them – not being separated into groups based on gender. Eaglets, too, enjoy camping and hiking, they place great emphasis on being self-reliant, responsible and trustworthy when asked for help. It is also stressed that merely accumulating a history of achievements is secondary to the goal of self-development and growth, with everyone's input helping to grow all together as a team.

=== Eaglet Circle ===
The Eaglet Circle is the smallest stable self-governing, self-regulating unit, usually under 35 children, unlike Boy Scouts, of both genders, directed by two or more Eaglet Circle Leaders. Initially members of the Eaglet Circle are called "Eaglet Candidates", and the actual "Eaglet" title has to be earned by successfully completing tasks assigned, while displaying a positive attitude. The processes of officially establishing the Eaglet Circle and assigning individual Eaglet titles happens during the second and third weeks of camp.

The Eaglet Circle, while supervised and directed by one or more Eaglet Circle Leaders, is also governed by the Eaglet Circle Captain (elected permanently for the duration of the camp) and the Eaglet Circle Captain of the Day (elected daily during the evening meeting). There are sometimes more than one Captain that addresses different aspects of the Eaglet Circle (for example, for the duration of a trip there could be the Trip Captain in addition to the main one), but they all work together with the Eaglet Circle, with the Eaglet Circle meeting having the final say on things that affect everybody.

Throughout the day, there could be multiple smaller units formed, Task Committees. The smallest Task Committee may be 3–4 children that will work on assignments. For example, an entire Eaglet Circle may have to come up with a stage performance, and to make the task easier, will break into smaller Task Committees addressing various parts: stage setup, choreography, music, script, troop, etc. etc. Once work commences, results are reported at the Eaglet Circle meeting.

Eaglet Circles obey five Eaglet Circle laws and follow about a dozen traditions. Each Eaglet Circle is also supposed to have some kind of signature, distinguishing it from other circles, and this is where creativity and improvisation plays an important part; simply copying what others have done before is viewed as below the Eaglet Circle's self-respect. The Eaglet Circle's signature could be a song, a T-shirt, a name, a talisman or a mascot, or the combination of all of these, but altogether it should have some form of meaning for the particular Eaglet Circle that it represents.

=== Eaglet Circle Laws ===
The original laws and traditions brought by Communards in 1962 and 1963 now became these:

- The Zero-Zero Law – Be on time with attendance and tasks; respect others' time. This law also calls to be brief and eloquent when talking to others, picking up the correct words to avoiding bombarding listeners with meaningless words or phrases.
- The Territory Law – Stay within the camp grounds unless you are part of a Task Committee or an Eaglet Circle working on a task; also, obtain permission to do so when working on an individual task. Try not to trespass other Eaglet Circle's territory when they are busy with something, unless you can offer help. This law also marks the limits of acceptable behavior (positive territory); bad habits and destructive/offensive deeds (negative territory), are to be left outside.
- The Green Law – Respect our environment, local and global, don't litter, and pick up trash even if it is not yours. Do something good all the time, plant trees or flowers, clean up what you can and help others, even when not asked to. There is no Earth B if we trash this Earth A.
- The Sea Law – Respect the Black Sea and know that it does not like recklessness. While it is beautiful and playful at one hour, it can unexpectedly turn cruel and deadly at another. This law extends to any entity that is dangerous and unpredictable: don't overestimate your strengths and know your limitations.
- The Raised Hand Law – When one raises a hand, one speaks, everyone listens without interrupting. It is also understood that he or she is brief in what has to be said and will not be wasting others' time. This also means – before raising your hand, think through what you have to say. If it is a question, than maybe it has been answered already. If it is a statement, what value will it add?

=== Eaglet Circle traditions ===
- Tradition of Kindness – Every morning starts with a "Good Morning!" no matter how bad the weather may be, wishing all to have a good day. Every evening ends with the Eaglet Circle meeting closing on a positive note and wishing for all to have a good night. Unexpected and nice surprises are the norm of almost every day, i.e., maybe a post card congratulating the passing of dark clouds in the sky, or a photo/painting of a flower, or anything small but nice, passed between Eaglets and Eaglet Circles as tokens of comradeship.
- Everybody is equal in the Eaglet Circle, everybody has the same rights and responsibilities; one can be either within the Circle or outside, and nobody is above or below the Circle and the laws that govern it. All discussions held give opportunity for everyone's opinion to be said (see The Raised Hand Law).
- Nobody steps in the interior of the Eaglet Circle during the meeting or a song, because it is similar to stepping on the invisible "Circle's Heart" (the only exception – during the goodbyes when the Camp is over, Eaglets put their bags in the center of the circle).
- If it is not you, then who – when something has to be done, pick it up and get it done (if needed permissions and approvals, do that, too); there are no passive people, there are people who simply have not found something positive or useful to do that would appeal to them.
- If it is not creative, then why bother at all – all tasks are done not just by following step after step, but also with a creative flair, like a kind of "signature" that makes it different from similar tasks done by others before. A task done creatively is worth three done out of necessity.
- When criticizing, be prepared to offer something better, otherwise be quiet and at least don't interfere with others working out a solution. Blanket negative statements are also off limits.
- Write down what has been said – a thought not written down is lost forever. Eaglets are encouraged to keep brief daily diaries where they would match achievements with goals set and note everything else that goes with that.
- Self-governing, self-regulation, self-improvement – starting from the first day, "Let's think how to make things better and more interesting to all" and never stop adding new, fixing/improving existing things that maybe need to be fixed or improved; non-stop seeking of ideas and ways of doing it all better, maybe even the way nobody ever has done it before.
- Tradition of volunteering – Volunteering does not have to be top-down planned; some tasks, like cleaning up a nearby creek or planting trees destroyed during a recent winter storm, only needs some collective thinking and active participation.
- There are no negative people, there are negative deeds – nobody is born into being bad, people do make mistakes and sometimes do something bad; those bad deeds are what gets discussed, not personalities or characters. It also means that quite a great deal of credit is given to be trusted, but it, too, may run out when abused regularly.
- Tradition of songs – Singing a song together in an Eaglet Circle is a sacred moment, and it cannot be just any song. Songs are picked to be bonding and positive; not like a choir, but like a circle of friends and comrades, with everyone's voice heard. An Eaglet song can be started by anyone, but once it is started it has to be sung by everybody from the beginning to the end. This tradition also extends to any tasks done; similarly to singing, tasks have to be done from the beginning to the end. (Exception to this tradition is when someone is sad and does not feel like joining in – he or she can be present, but quiet, and it is understood to be a sign of sorrow). Most Eaglet Circle meetings end with a song sang standing in a circle with everyone's hands on the shoulders of the Eaglets to the left and to the right.
- Tradition of Eaglet Circle evening meetings – every evening before retiring for the night is a meeting that has three questions, "What went well throughout the day and how can it be continued? What went wrong throughout the day and what to do about it? What's next?". Good deeds and successful completion of tasks are noted, awards and tokens of appreciation are given to those deserving of them. Mistakes and errors are discussed and ways to avoid these in the future are suggested. The next day's plan is worked out and elections take place (for example, a new Captain of the Day is elected).
- Tradition of Eaglets' Code of Honor – the "Eaglet" title can be lost by doing negative deeds (it is called "neglecting The Eaglets' Code of Honor") or by being passive and/or destructive toward what others are trying to do. The title will have to be regained again, if one wants his voice to be heard during the Eaglet Circle meetings.

== Commemorations ==
- A minor planet, 2188 Orlenok, was discovered in 1976 by Soviet astronomer Lyudmila Zhuravlyova and is named in honor of the camp.
- The book Lost in Moscow (sometimes called Lost in Moscow: A brat in the USSR; published by Turnstone Press in 2005) by Kirsten Koza, chronicles the true-life experience of an eleven-year-old Canadian girl's summer at Orlyonok during 1977.
- September 1–12, 2000 – a group of Orlyonok employees climbed the west summit of the mountain Elbrus, dedicating this to the Orlyonok's 40th anniversary.

== See also ==
- Igor Ivanov
- Artek
- Ocean
