= Young Pioneers (Soviet Union) =

Soviet Union youth organization

Vladimir Lenin All-Union Pioneer Organization Всесоюзная пионерская организация имени Владимира Ленина
- "Always Ready!" (Всегда готов!)
- Founded: 19 May 1922
- Dissolved: 28 September 1991
- Headquarters: Moscow, Soviet Union
- Ideology: Communism; Marxism-Leninism
- Position: Far-left
- Mother party: Communist Party of the Soviet Union; Komsomol
- International affiliation: International Committee of Children's and Adolescents' Movements
- Newspaper: Pionerskaya Pravda

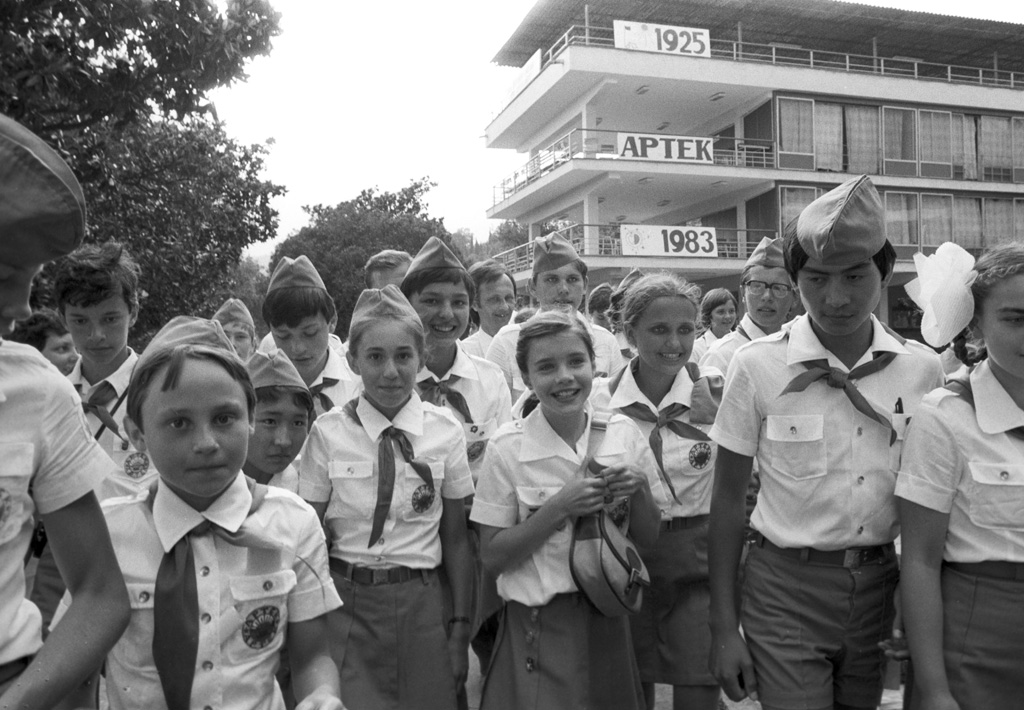
Samantha Smith with Young Pioneers, 1983

The Vladimir Lenin All-Union Pioneer Organization, (Note: Russian: Всесоюзная пионерская организация имени В. И. Ленина, romanized: Vsesoyuznaya pionerskaya organizatsiya imeni V. I. Lenina, IPA: [fsʲɪsɐjˈuznəjə pʲɪɐnʲˈerskəjə ɐrɡənʲɪˈzatsɨjə ˈimʲɪnʲɪ vɛ i lʲˈenʲɪnə], lit. 'The All-Union Pioneer Organization named after V. I. Lenin') shortened to the Young Pioneers, was a youth organization of the Soviet Union for children and adolescents ages 9–14 that existed between 1922 and 1991.

== History ==
A documentary from 1940 about the Young Pioneer camp Artek

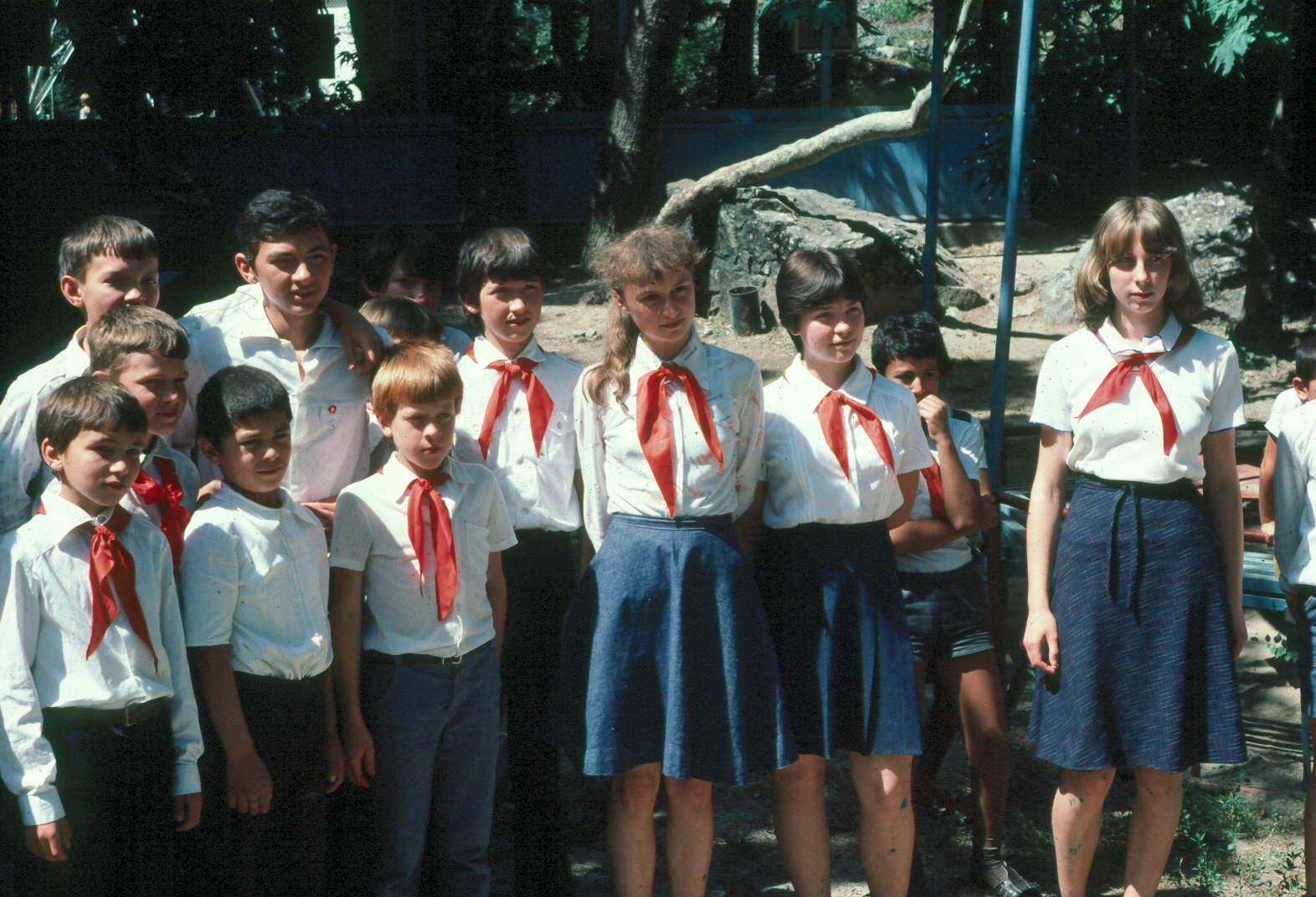
Pioneers in the Zeravshan Mountains of the Tajik SSR in 1983

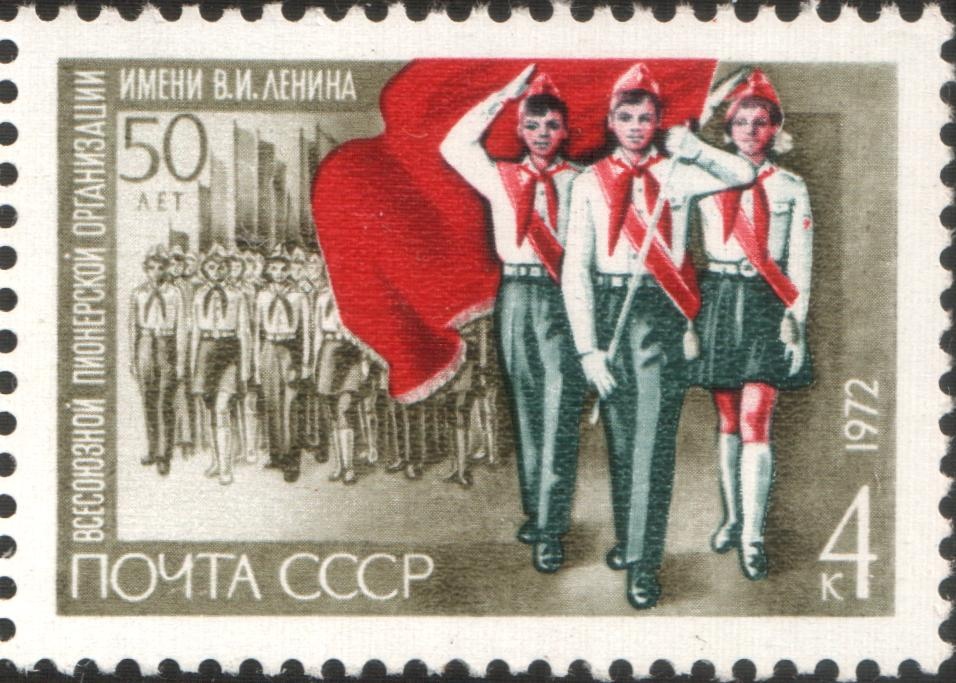
50 years, Stamp, 1972

After the October Revolution of 1917, some Scouts took the Bolsheviks' side, which would later lead to the establishment of ideologically altered Scoutlike organizations, such as ЮК (Юные Коммунисты, or young communists; pronounced as yook) and others.

During the Russian Civil War from 1917 to 1921, most of the Scoutmasters and many Scouts fought in the ranks of the White Army and interventionists against the Red Army.

Those Scouts who did not wish to accept the new Soviet system either left Russia (like Oleg Pantyukhov and others) or went underground.

=== Foundation of the Young Pioneers ===
However, clandestine Scouting on both sides of the war did not last long. The Russian Union of the Communist Youth (RKSM, later known as Komsomol) persistently fought with the remnants of the Scout movement. Between 1918 and 1920, the second, third, and fourth All-Russian Congresses of RKSM decided to eradicate the Scout movement and create an organization of the communist type, that would take Soviet children and young adults under its umbrella. This organization would properly educate young people with communist teachings.

On behalf of the Soviet Council of People's Commissars, Nadezhda Krupskaya (Vladimir Lenin's wife and the People's Commissar of State for Education) was one of the main contributors to the cause of the Pioneer movement. In 1922, she wrote an essay called "Russian Union of the Communist Youth and boy-Scoutism." However, it was the remaining scoutmasters themselves who supported the Komsomol and the Red Army, like Innokentiy Zhukov and some others around Nikolaj Fatyanov's "Brothers of the fire", who introduced the name "pioneer" to it and convinced the Komsomol to keep the scout motto "Be prepared!" and adapt it to "Always prepared!" as the organizational motto and slogan.

Just some days before the Komsomol conference the Moscow scoutmasters adopted a "Declaration of the scoutmasters of Moscow concerning the question of the formation of a children's movement in the RSFSR" on May 13, 1922. Thereby they suggested to use the scouting system as a foundation of the new communist organization for children, and give the "Young Pioneers" name to it.

The main contribution of the scoutmasters was the introduction of the new expression system scouting into the discourse on communist children's and young adult organizations. By doing so they avoided the dissolution of the scout organization as it would happen sooner or later to any organization opposed to the Komsomol.

On May 19, 1922, the second All-Russian Komsomol Conference adopted the scoutmasters' suggestions and decided to "work on the question of a children's movement by using the re-organized system of scouting." During the following years many of the remaining former scoutmasters, who later became the first pioneer leaders in their respective areas, founded pioneer groups and educated future pioneer leaders in these.

May 19, 1922 was later on considered the birthday of the All-Union Pioneer Organization (Всесоюзная пионерская организация, or Vsesoyuznaya pionerskaya organizatsiya) and is marked as the official Pioneer Day. By October 1922 pioneer units nationwide were united to form the Spartak Young Pioneers Organization (SYPO) (Russian: Юные пионеры имени Спартака), which was officially granted the honorific title "V. I. Lenin" by a decision of the Central Committee of Komsomol of January 21, 1924, becoming the Vladimir Lenin Spartak Young Pioneers Organization (VLSYPO). Since March 1926 it bore the name Vladimir Lenin All-Union Pioneer Organization (VLAUPO).

=== Growth ===
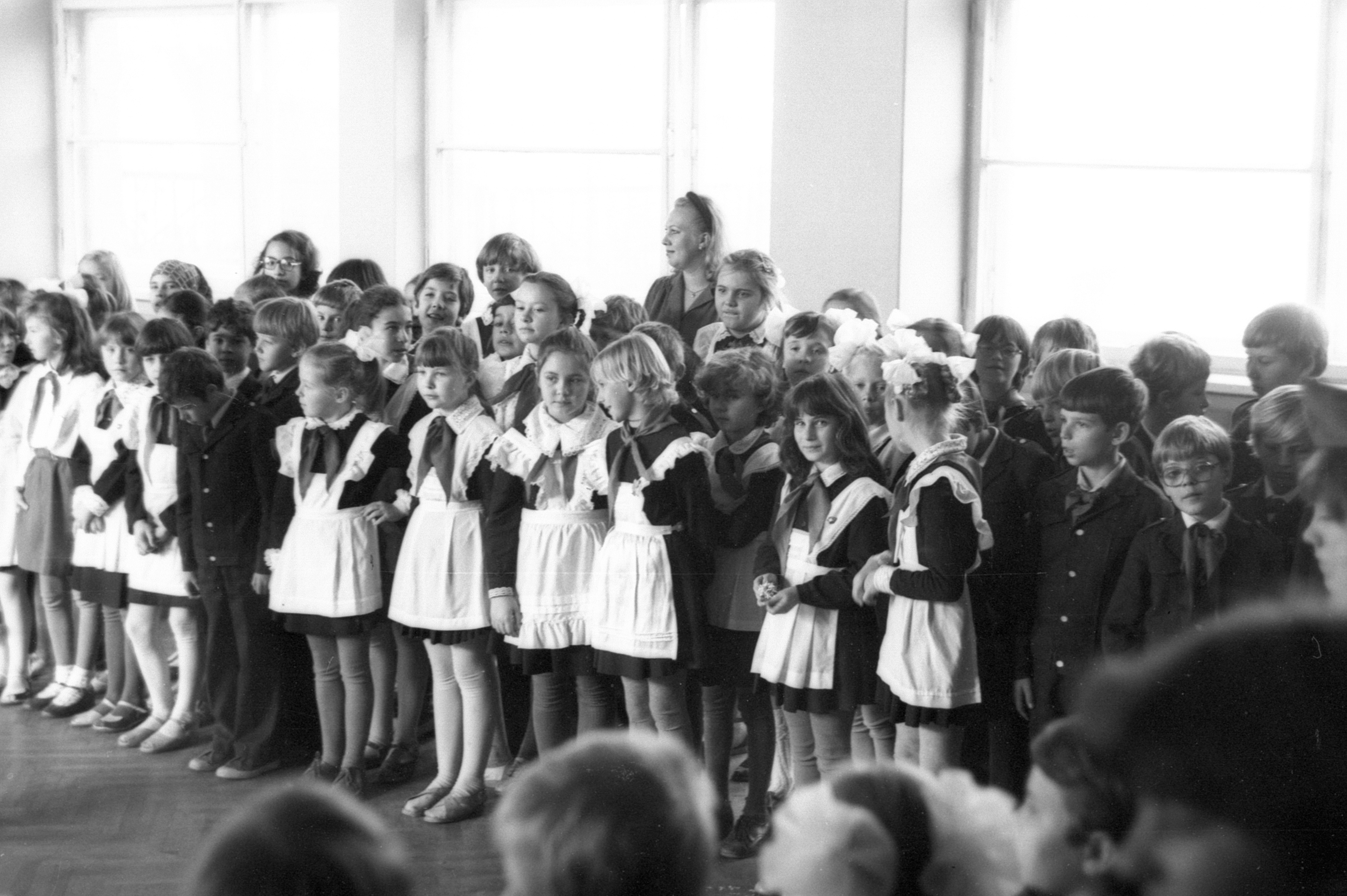
Young pioneers at school, 1984

By the middle of 1923, the young organization had 75,000 members with hundreds of mature adult and teen instructors. Among other activities, Young Pioneer units, helped by the Komsomol members and leadership at all levels, played a great role in the eradication of illiteracy (Likbez policy) since 1923. Membership was at 161,000 in the beginning of 1924, 2 million in 1926, 13.9 million in 1940, and 25 million in 1974. Many Young Pioneer Palaces were built, which served as community centers for the children, with rooms dedicated to various clubs, such as crafts or sports. Thousands of Young Pioneer camps were set up where young people went during summer vacation and winter holidays. All of them were free of charge, sponsored by the government and the Trade Unions. By the 1930s, as Stalin's cult of personality was taking shape and the nation becoming a growing economic and later on a military superpower via the Five Year Plans and the expansion and modernization of the armed forces, the Pioneers were promoted as models of a true socialist future generation of youth determined to help bring the Soviet Union towards the total victory of communism at home in all sectors of society.

During the Second World War the Pioneers worked hard to contribute to the war effort at all costs. Thousands of them died in battles as military personnel and in the resistance against Nazi Germany in its occupied territories as partisans and Pioneers under secrecy in enemy-occupied towns and cities, even in concentration camps. Four Pioneers would later receive the title Hero of the Soviet Union, and countless others were awarded various state orders, decorations and medals for acts of bravery and courage in the battlefield, on enemy lines and occupied territories. Pioneers in areas away from military operations assisted in the home front efforts to support the men and women fighting in the front lines, as well as in preparing to meet the requirements for wartime conscription service.

=== Present ===
Following the Dissolution of the Soviet Union and Boris Yeltsin's banning of the Communist Party of the Soviet Union in 1991, the organization also disbanded. However, the Communist Party of the Russian Federation had a successor organization which utilized the same uniforms and structure as the original pioneers.

Following the Russian invasion of Ukraine, as part of the Big Change initiative, the Russian Government held a parade through Red Square on May 22, 2022, to commemorate the 100th anniversary of the Pioneers and the 104th anniversary of Komsomol. During which, a new organization, the Movement of the First was officially created with 5,000 children signing up. The state run organization maintains the uniforms of the Soviet pioneers, and the organization openly uses the Hammer and sickle and the bust of Lenin on its flags. Vladimir Putin said in a speech at the rally, "[the idea for the movement was] exclusively the presidential administration's.” Various Russian political commentators, from Cosmonaut Aleksandr Volkov to radio personality Sergey Dorenko came out in support of the new movement, saying that it will instill patriotic values in children, and prevent them from becoming subversive to the Russian state. The Russian government has estimated that 18 million Russian children could join the new pioneers to develop "socially significant and creative activity, high moral qualities, love and respect for the Fatherland." Gennady Zyuganov, leader of the Communist Party of the Russian Federation, has come out in support of the organization inheriting the legacy of the Pioneers.

== Structure ==
Its main grouping of members until 1942 was the "Young Pioneer detachment," which then typically consisted of children belonging to the same secondary school.

From 1942 to October 1990 (when the organization was broken up) the "squad" (отряд) was made up of children belonging to the same class within a school, while a school was referred to as a "Young Pioneer druzhina." Larger squads were split into sub-units called zveno (Звено, literally "chain link").

There was also an age-scale structure: children of 10–11 years were called Young Pioneers of the first stage; children of 11–12 years were Young Pioneers of the second stage; young adults of 9–15 years were Young Pioneers of the third stage. Aged 14, Young Pioneers could join the Komsomol, with a recommendation from their Young Pioneer group.

The main governing body was the Central Soviet of the Young Pioneer organization of the Soviet Union, which worked under the leadership of the main governing body of Komsomol.

Its official newspaper was Pionerskaya Pravda.

== Main goals and requirements of membership ==
The main goals and duties of Young Pioneers and requirements of membership were specified by the Regulations of the Young Pioneer organization of the Soviet Union; by the Solemn Promise (given by each Young Pioneer joining the organization); by the Rules of the Young Pioneers; and by the Young Pioneer Motto, всегда готов! (vsegda gotov!, "Always Ready!"). There were two major revisions of them: in 1967 and 1986.

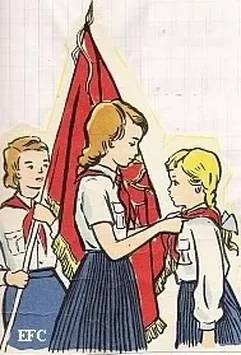
Illustration of the recruitment of a female pioneer

In the 3rd grade of school, children were allowed to join the Young Pioneer Organization, which was done in batches, as a solemn ceremony, often in a Pioneers Palace. Only the best students were allowed into the first batch, slightly less advanced and well-behaved were allowed into the second batch, several weeks later. The most ill-behaved or low-performing students were given time to 'catch up' and could be allowed to join only in the 4th grade, a year after the first batch of their classmates.

In line with the Soviet doctrine of state atheism, the «Young Pioneer Leader's Handbook» stated that "every Pioneer would set up an atheist's corner at home with anti-religious pictures, poems, and sayings", in contrast to the traditional Russian Orthodox icon corners. The Young Pioneers, "as representatives of atheism and political change, encountered massive resistance in rural areas". In the same vein, some students refused to join the organization because of its promotion of Marxist-Leninist atheism.

== Symbols, attributes, rituals and traditions ==
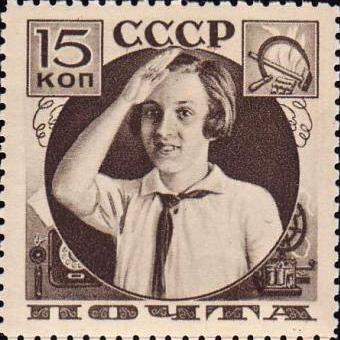
Saluting Pioneer on a 1936 postage stamp

The main symbols of Young Pioneers were the red banner, flag, Young Pioneer's red neck scarf and the organizational badge. Attributes: the bugle, the drum, the organizational uniform (with badges of rank). Some rituals and traditions of the organization were: the Young Pioneer salute, Young Pioneer parade, color guard duty and flag raising. Most common traditions were the Young Pioneers rally (usually round a bonfire, similar to Scout Jamborees) and festivals.

=== Uniform ===
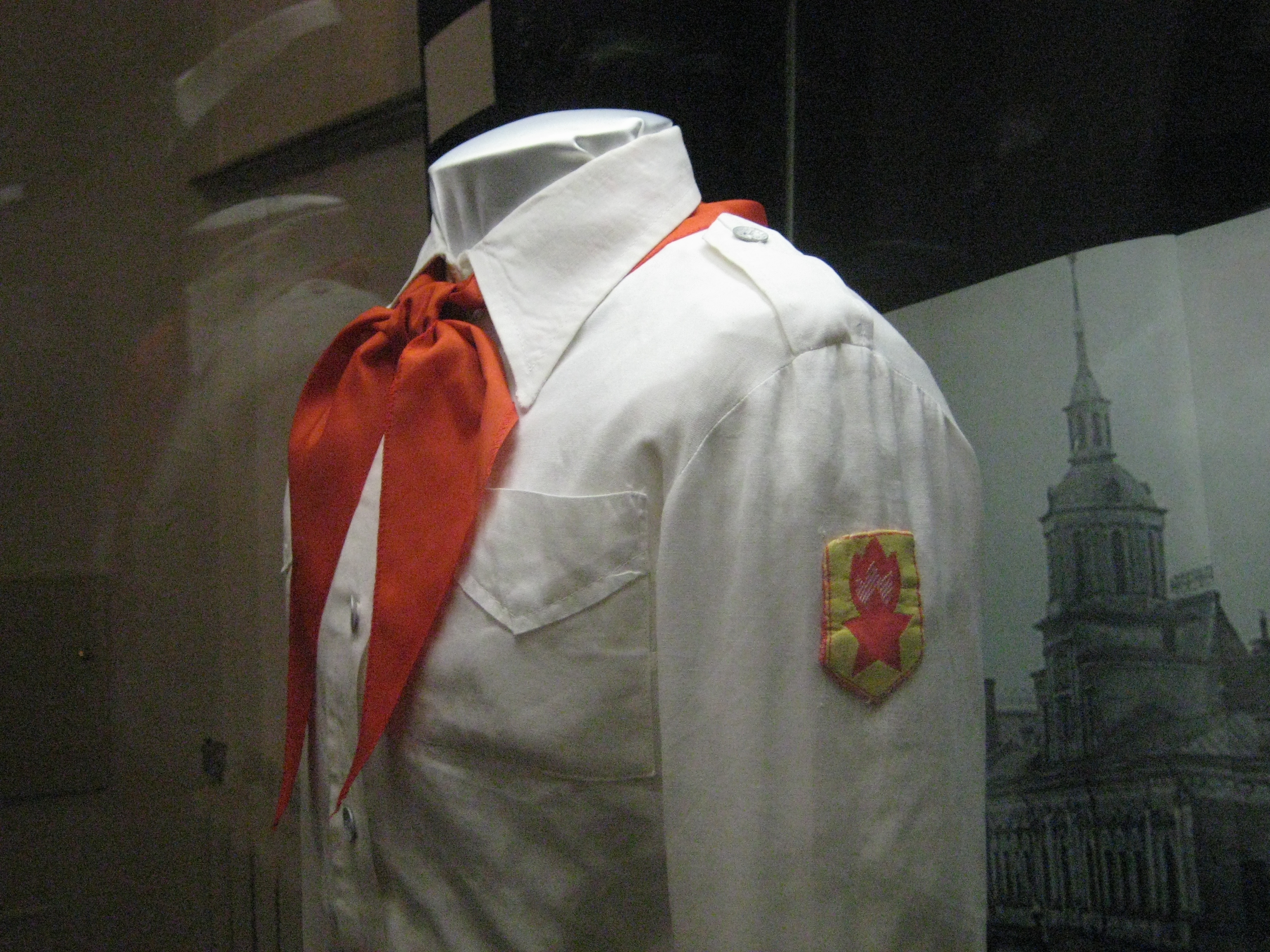
White uniform dress of the Pioneers

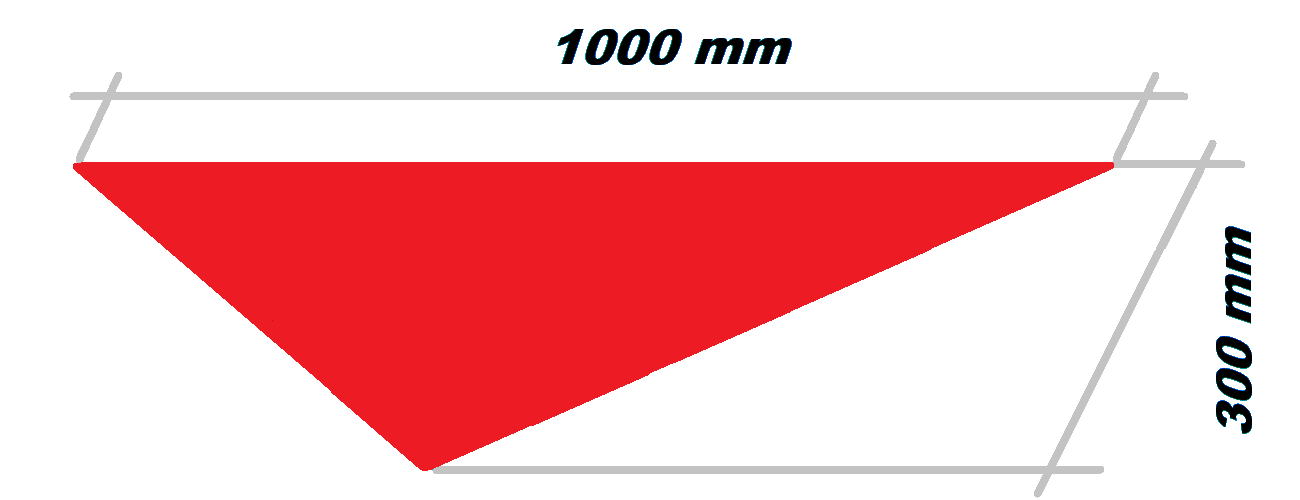
Pioneer's necktie (red)

The uniform was one of many things that identified Pioneers with each other and the people. The uniform, part of the school uniform worn at school, included the red neckerchief and the organizational and rank badges on the white shirt with long or short pants for boys and long or short skirts for girls, with optional side caps as headdress. Full dress uniforms, used in occasions, were light blue or white with red side caps, the red neckerchief and the badges, with crimson sashes for color bearers and the color escorts. When on outdoor duties brown polo shirts with pants or skirts depending on gender were used, with an optional side cap. Sea service uniforms used sailor caps and blue and white shirts (with telnyashkas) and pants or skirts depending on the gender, with a brown belt. Instructors and mature adult leaders wore the same uniforms and the caps in every occasion and in all meetings. In its early years the Pioneers wore campaign hats in major events.

=== The Solemn Promise ===
On the day a new batch of members joined the Vladimir Lenin All-Union Pioneer Organization in full uniform, they would have to recite the following Solemn Promise in front of a group of other Pioneers, unit leaders and instructors (1986 revision is presented below). After reciting, the new members had their new Pioneers scarlet neckerchiefs tied by older members, and thus, becoming full-fledged members of the organization.

"I, (last name, first name), joining the ranks of the Vladimir Ilyich Lenin All-Union Pioneer Organization, in the presence of my comrades solemnly promise: to passionately love and cherish my Motherland, to live as the great Lenin bade us to, as the Communist Party teaches us to, and as required by the laws of the Pioneers of the Soviet Union."
"(Я, (фамилия, имя), вступая в ряды Всесоюзной пионерской организации имени Владимира Ильича Ленина, перед лицом своих товарищей торжественно обещаю: горячо любить и беречь свою Родину, жить, как завещал великий Ленин, как учит Коммунистическая партия, как требуют Законы пионеров Советского Союза)"

=== Motto ===
The motto of the Young Pioneers of the Soviet Union consisted of two parts, the summons and the answer or response (1986 revision is presented below).

1. Summons - Pioneer, to fight for the cause of the Communist Party of the Soviet Union, be prepared! (Пионер, к борьбе за дело Коммунистической партии Советского Союза будь готов!).
2. Response - Always prepared! (Всегда готов!).

This, like other rituals and customs of the organization, reflected its origin in the Scouts movement (their motto is "Be Prepared").

=== Rules ===
The latest revision of the official Rules of the Young Pioneers of the Soviet Union was in 1986, it is presented below. The Rules often appeared on many children's items, such as school notebooks.

- Pioneer is a young builder of communism, labors for the welfare of the Motherland, prepares to become its defender.
- Pioneer is an active fighter for peace, a friend to Young Pioneers and workers' children of all countries.
- Pioneer follows the communists' example, prepares to become a Komsomol member, leads the Little Octobrists.
- Pioneer upholds the organization's honour, strengthens its authority by deeds and actions.
- Pioneer is a reliable comrade, respects the elders, looks after younger people, always acts according to conscience.
- Pioneer has a right to elect and be elected to Young Pioneer self-government institutions, to discuss the functioning of the Young Pioneer organization on Young Pioneer gatherings, meetings, gatherings of Soviets of Young Pioneer detachments and Young Pioneer groups, in the press; to criticize shortcomings; to submit a proposal to any Soviet of the Young Pioneer organization, including the Central Soviet of the V. I. Lenin All-Union Pioneer Organization; to ask for a recommendation of the Soviet of Young Pioneer group to join the VLKSM when on the right age to join.

=== Songs ===
Young Pioneer songs were usually sung at various Young Pioneer meetings, in Young Pioneer camps, and at schools. One of the earliest and the most popular songs was the Young Pioneer March. It was written in 1922 by Aleksandr Zharov (music by Sergei Dyoshkin) and was sometimes called The Anthem of Young Pioneers. There were a great variety of songs, so here are some very popular ones:

- Accepting you into Young Pioneers (music by Aleksandra Pakhmutova, lyrics by N.Dobronravov)
- Song about the first Young Pioneer detachment (A.Dolukhanian, S.Runge)
- Our land (Dmitry Kabalevsky, A.Prishelets)
- Gaidar is marching first (Aleksandra Pakhmutova, N.Dobronravov)
- The eaglet (V.Bely, Ya. Shvedov)
- Rise up in bonfires, thee blue nights (S. Kaidan-Deshkin, A. Zharov)
- Whirlwinds of Danger (Whirlwinds of danger are raging around us) - (W. Święcicki, translated by G. Kryzhanovsky)
- The little joyful drummer (L. Schwarz, Bulat Okudzhava)
- March of Young Pioneer groups (N.Gubarkov, G. Khodosov)
- May there always be sunshine (A.Ostrovsky, L.Oshanin)
- That's Me and You (Y. Chichkov)

=== Colours of units of the VLAUPO ===
These colours, in gold fringe, were in red with the organizational badge and motto in the obverse and in the reverse the name of the school detachment (elementary or secondary) or area authority (village/selsoviet, town/city, district/autonomous district, oblast/autonomous republic/autonomous oblast and republican) of the VLAUPO in gold lettering.

== Awards ==
The Young Pioneers who excelled in academic study, work, sports or social activity were elected to the self-governing institutions, were sent as delegates to the Young Pioneers gatherings (including All-Union ones). The most notable were recognized in the organization's Book of Honor. During World War II, many Young Pioneers fought against Nazis in partisan detachments and/or Party underground units, which existed near their homes on territories occupied by Nazi Germany and their allies, while Pioneers in areas away from enemy lines helped in the home front efforts. Nearly 30,000 of them were awarded various orders and medals; four Young Pioneers became Heroes of the Soviet Union. One of the famous young pioneer All-Union camps was "Artek" located in Crimea opened in the 1930s. The camp was located on the top of the mountain "A-yu-dahg" which means "Bear's Mountain". Only the best students were selected to go there based on their grades and leadership. Young communists from other countries were welcome as well.

== In popular culture ==
In the 1935 live-action animated film The New Gulliver (a Communist retelling of Jonathan Swift's classic novel), the framing story takes place at the Artek Young Pioneer camp, and the main character, Petya Konstantinov is an exemplary Pioneer boy.

The 1936 musical composition Peter and the Wolf written by Sergey Prokofiev is about a Young Pioneer called Peter who captures a wolf.

The 1964 satirical comedy film Welcome, or No Trespassing, directed by Elem Klimov, takes place in a Young Pioneer camp.

The 1972 stop motion animated film Cheburashka features a group of Young Pioneers, and the titular character and his friend, Crocodile Gena decide to become Pioneers themselves.

== Gallery ==
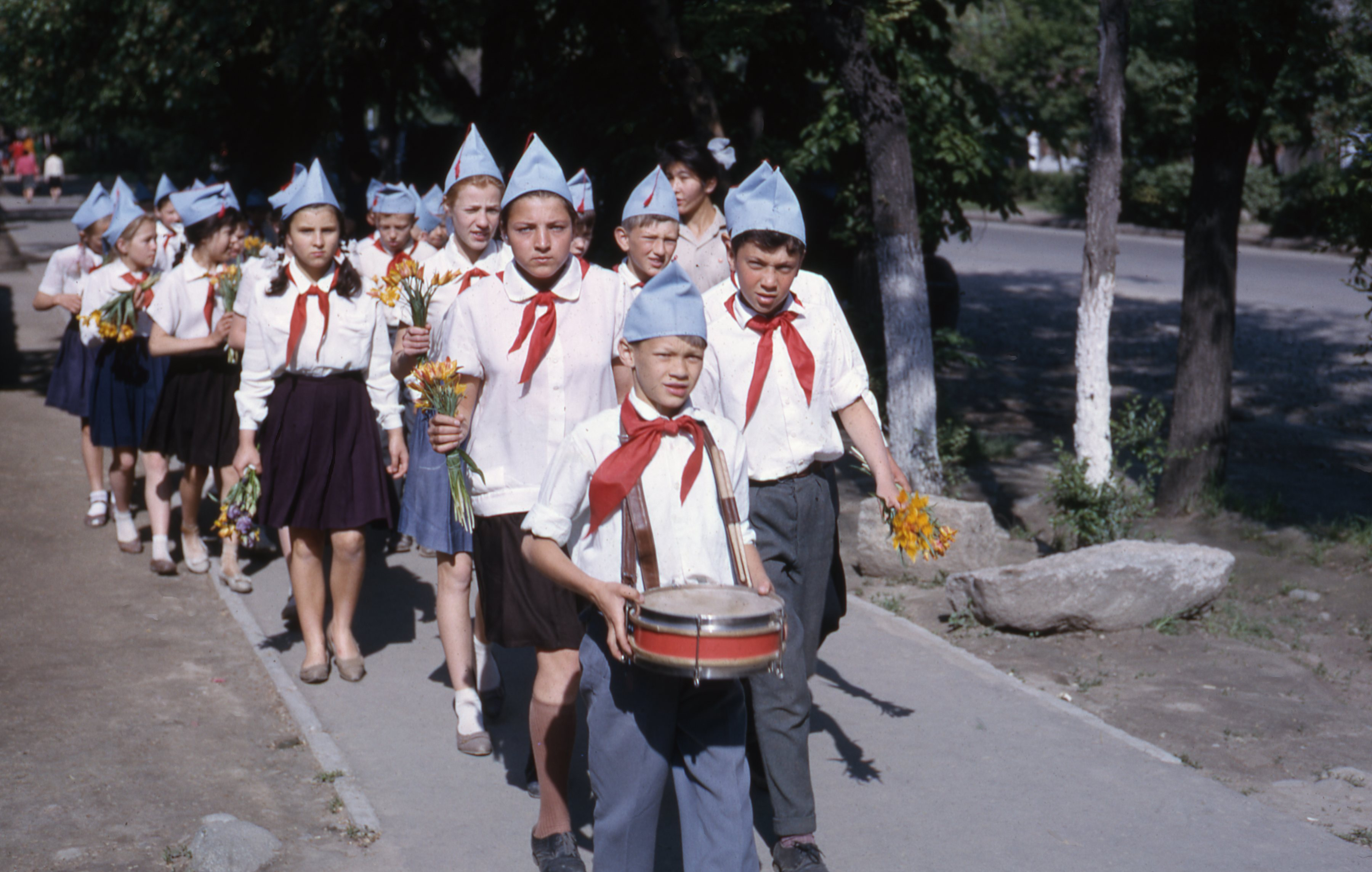
A group of young pioneers in Alma-ata, 1964

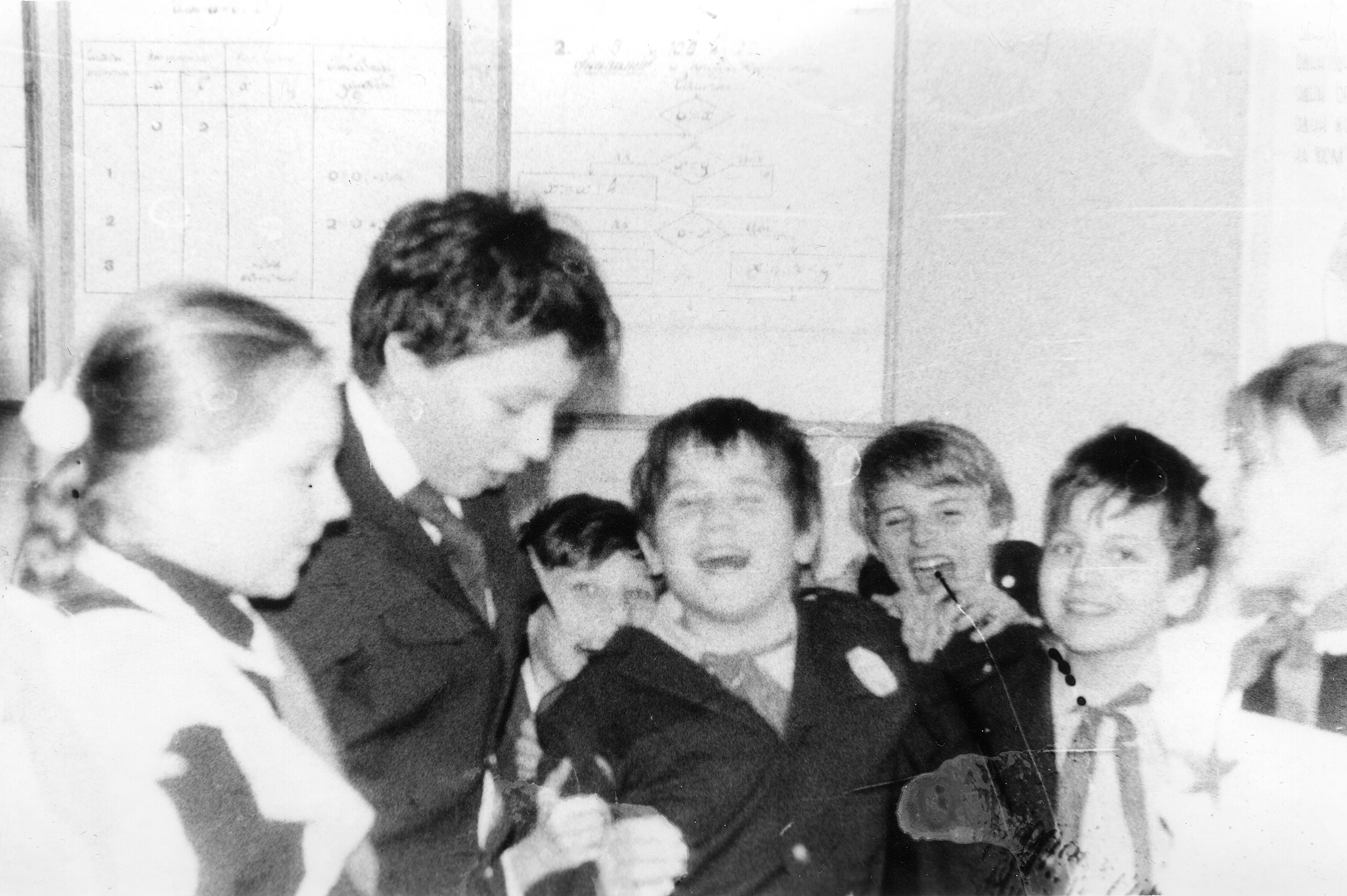
Young pioneers, 1987, Rostov-on-Don, Russia

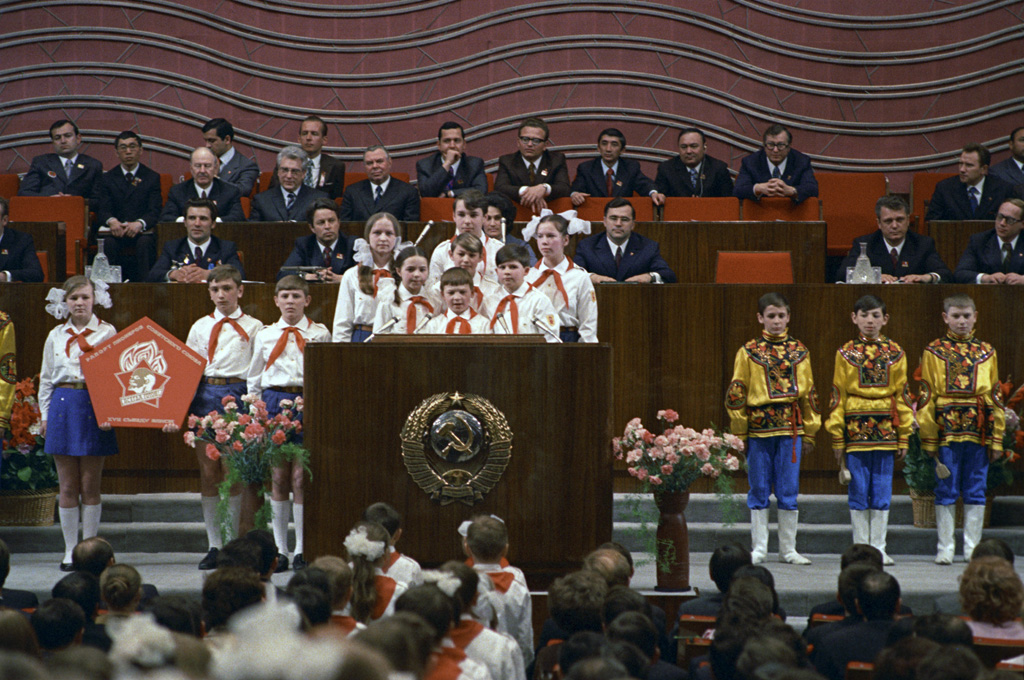
Pioneers greeting participants of Young Communist League Congress, 1974

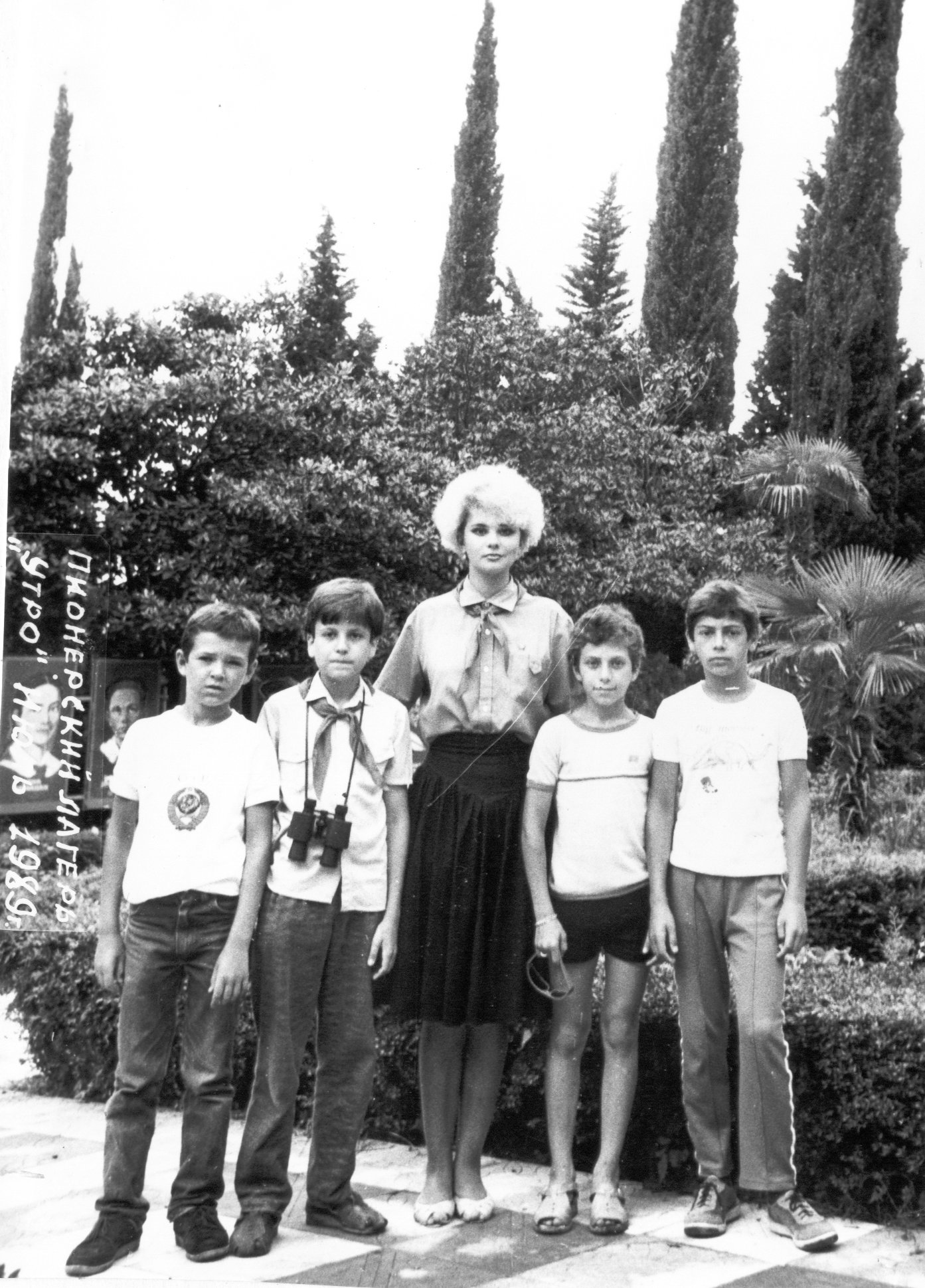
Pioneer Camp, 1989, Black Sea, Russia, USSR

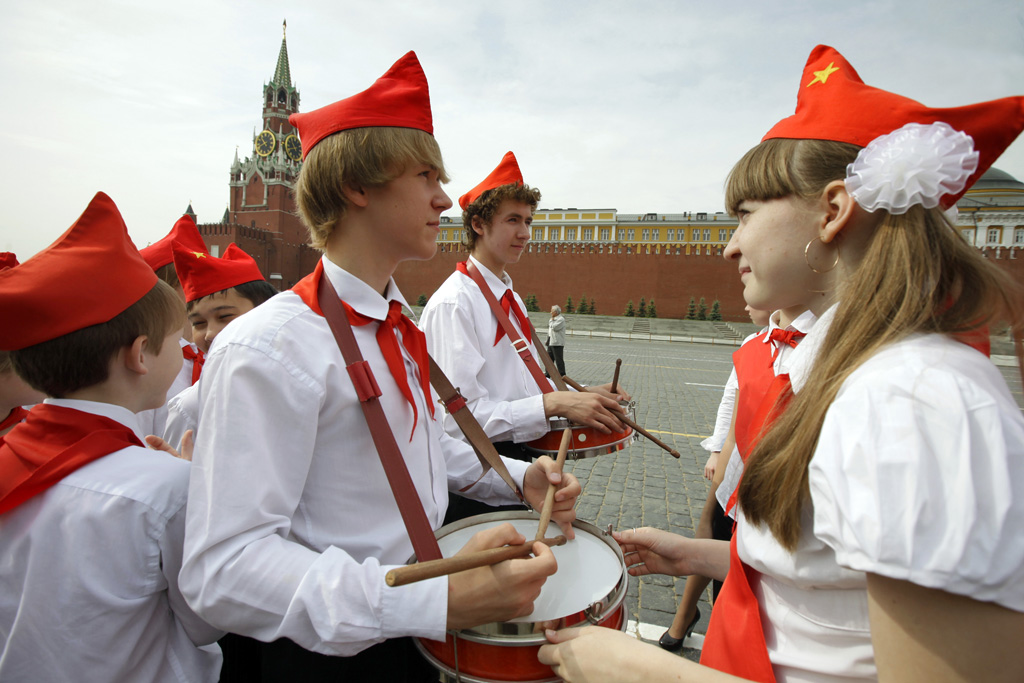
Communist Party of the Russian Federation Young Pioneers at the Red Square in Moscow, 2010

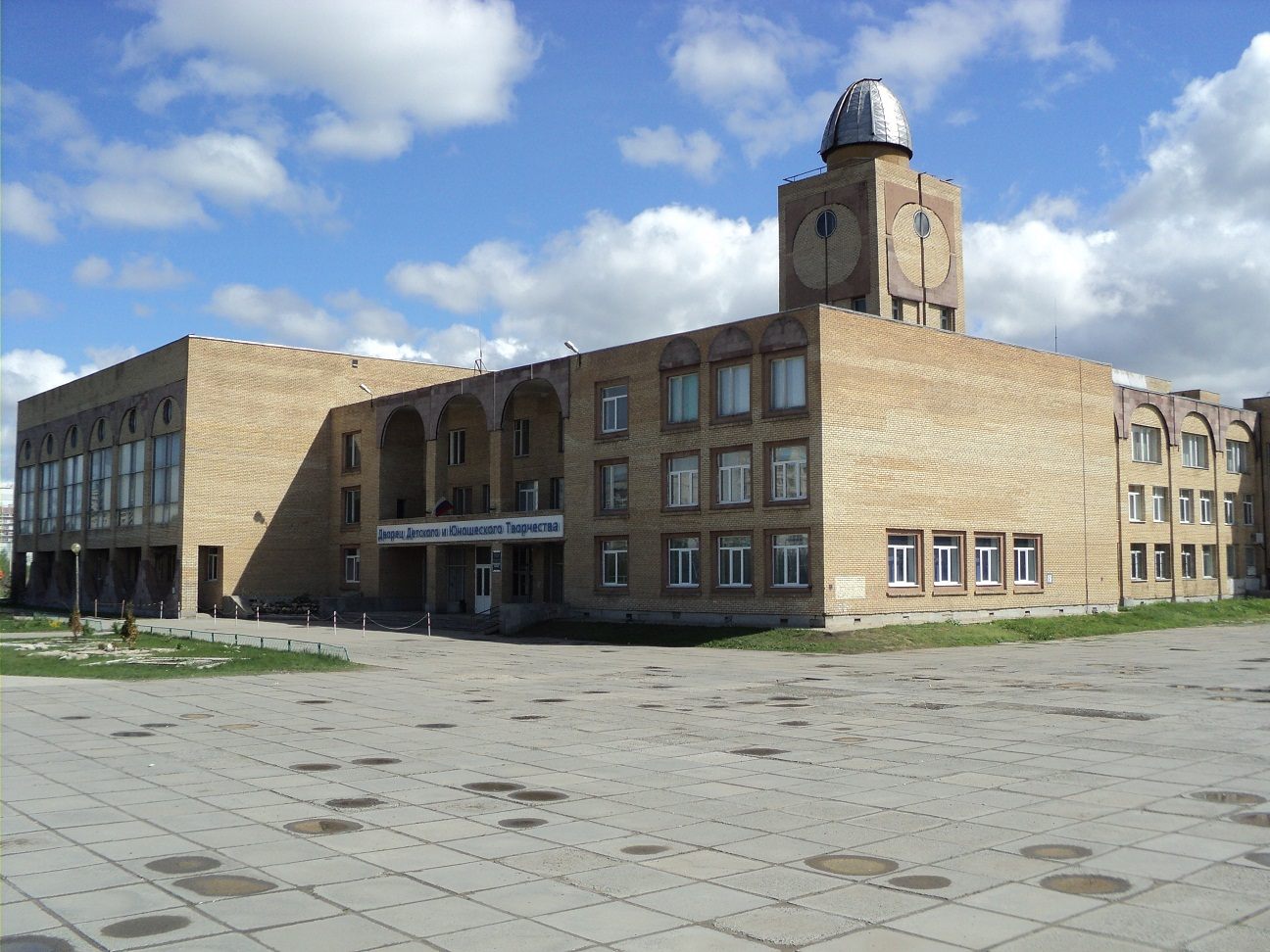
An example of a Pioneers Palace, also known as palaces of children and youth creativity in Russia. City of Togliatti

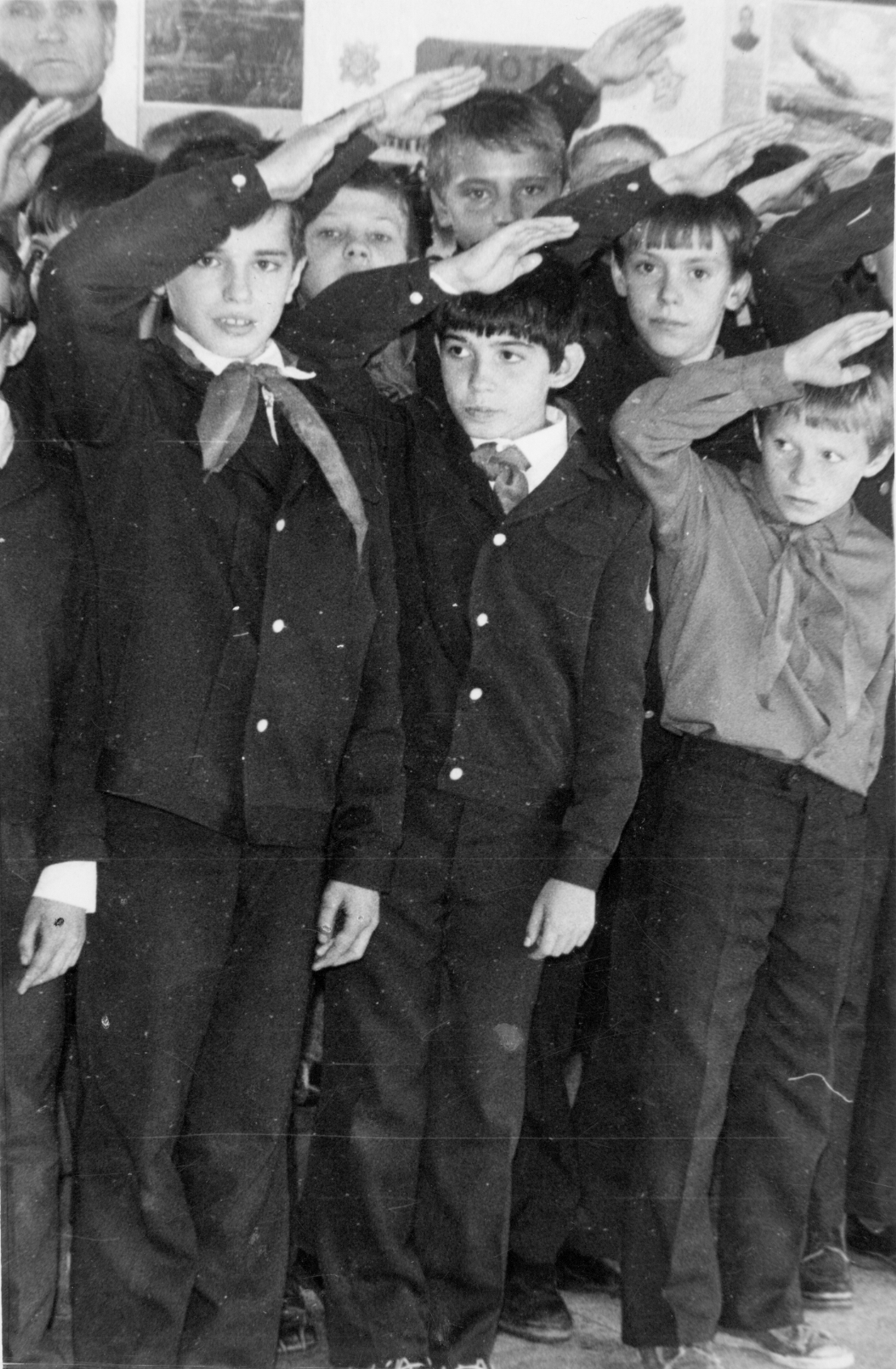
Dmitry Borshch (center) saluting while a part of the group, 1985

== See also ==
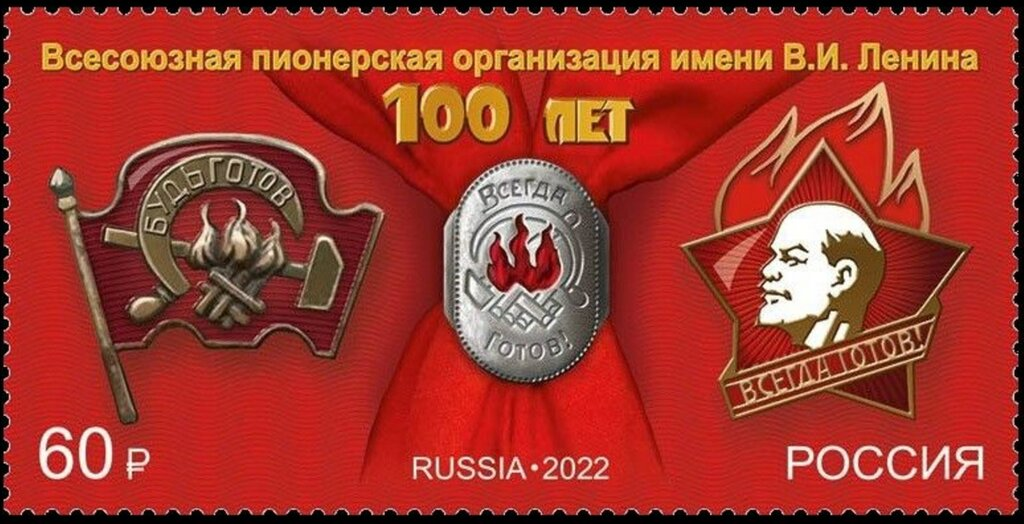
Russian stamp issued on the 100th anniversary of the Young Pioneers organization, 2023.

- Ready for Labour and Defence of the USSR
- Solemn Promise, Motto and Rules of Young Pioneers
- Young Pioneer camp
- Young Pioneer Palace
- Komsomol
- League of Militant Atheists
- Little Octobrist
- Ernst Thälmann Pioneer Organisation (East German equivalent)
- Pioneer Organization of the Socialist Youth Union (Czechoslovak equivalent)
- Union of Pioneers of Yugoslavia
- Young Pioneers of China
