= List of culture ministers of Russia =

This is a list of ministers of culture of Russia.

== Russian SFSR ==
=== Ministers of Culture (1953–1992) ===
Minister	Political party	Term of office	
Tatyana Zuyeva	Communist Party	1 April 1953	24 May 1958
Alexey Popov	Communist Party	24 May 1958	17 November 1965
Nikolay Kuznetsov	Communist Party	17 November 1965	28 February 1974
Yury Melentyev	Communist Party	28 February 1974	14 July 1990
Yury Solomin	Independent	8 September 1990	5 December 1991
Yevgeny Sidorov	Independent	5 February 1992	27 March 1992

== Russian Federation ==
=== Minister of Culture and Tourism (1992) ===
Minister	Political party	Term of office		Cabinet
Yevgeny Sidorov	Independent	27 March 1992	30 September 1992	Yeltsin–Gaidar

=== Ministers of Culture (1992–2004) ===
Minister	Political party	Term of office		Cabinet
Yevgeny Sidorov	Independent	23 December 1992	28 August 1997	Chernomyrdin I
Yevgeny Sidorov	Independent	23 December 1992	28 August 1997	Chernomyrdin II
Natalia Dementieva	Independent	28 August 1997	30 September 1998	Chernomyrdin II
Natalia Dementieva	Independent	28 August 1997	30 September 1998	Kiriyenko
Vladimir Yegorov	Independent	30 September 1998	8 February 2000	Primakov
Vladimir Yegorov	Independent	30 September 1998	8 February 2000	Stepashin
Vladimir Yegorov	Independent	30 September 1998	8 February 2000	Putin I
Mikhail Shvydkoy	Independent	8 February 2000	9 March 2004	Putin I
Mikhail Shvydkoy	Independent	8 February 2000	9 March 2004	Kasyanov

=== Minister of Culture and Mass Media (2004–2008) ===
Minister	Political party	Term of office		Cabinet
Alexander Sokolov	Independent	9 March 2004	12 May 2008	Fradkov I
Alexander Sokolov	Independent	9 March 2004	12 May 2008	Fradkov II
Alexander Sokolov	Independent	9 March 2004	12 May 2008	Zubkov

=== Ministers of Culture (since 2008) ===
Minister	Political party	Term of office		Cabinet
Alexander Avdeyev	Independent	12 May 2008	21 May 2012	Putin II
Vladimir Medinsky	United Russia	21 May 2012	21 January 2020	Medvedev I
Vladimir Medinsky	United Russia	21 May 2012	21 January 2020	Medvedev II
Olga Lyubimova	Independent	21 January 2020	Incumbent	Mishustin
