= Creative pedagogy =

Science and art of creative teaching

Creative Pedagogy is the science and art of creative teaching. It is a sub-field of Pedagogy, opposed to Critical pedagogy (just as creative thinking for example in Torrance Tests of Creative Thinking is opposed to critical thinking). "In its essence, creative pedagogy teaches learners how to learn creatively and become creators of themselves and creators of their future."

== Disambiguation ==
Creative Pedagogy should be differentiated (disambiguated) from Creative Education that is usually associated with teaching creativity as a subject (see Creative Education Foundation). Creative Pedagogy, on the contrary, can be applied to ANY subject, whether it is Math, Science, Language, or Economics and Finance. To some extent, one can state that subject does not matter, methodology (type of pedagogy) does: that's why the introduction of creative methodologies changes the process of teaching/learning.

== Definition ==
The founder of Creative Pedagogy, Dr. Andrei Aleinikov, defined it in the form of formula of invention – a strict word pattern used to describe inventions for patenting in technology:

“Creative pedagogy that includes educational influence on the learner for acquisition of certain study material (subject) [as pedagogy in general] and differing from the above by the fact that in order to achieve higher efficiency of learning, the pedagogical influence is provided on the background of centrifugal above-the-criticism mutual activity in which the learner is raised from the object of [pedagogical] influence to the rank of a creative person, while the traditional (basic) study material is transformed from the subject to learn into the means of achieving some creative goal, and the extra study material includes the description and demonstration of the heuristic methods and techniques.”

The concept of Creative Pedagogy got noticed and cited by numerous educators - see external links below. The authors of Encyclopedic Dictionary not only included an article on Creative Pedagogy, but also commented on its unusual form – the formula of invention.

== Etymology ==
See Pedagogy and Creativity

== Goal (Mission) ==
The goal of Creative Pedagogy is to transform ANY subject class (course, program, school) into a creative teaching process that would produce creative learners (life learners) – much more efficient learners than those produced by traditional school. This transformation of the traditional class (course, program, school) is called “creative orientation.”

== Discussion ==
A typical objection to the introduction of Creative Pedagogy is the following, “Every pedagogy is creative.” Some obvious counter examples to the word “every” are the so-called rote learning or, for instance, teaching by physical punishment - both very far from creative pedagogy.

Despite the slogans and inspiring practices of the great educators of the past like Jan Amos Komensky, Johann Heinrich Pestalozzi, Rudolf Steiner, Lev Vygotsky, Maria Montessori, Anton Makarenko, etc.), despite the wishes of parents and guardians, the type of pedagogy depends on the requirements of the society.

Creative pedagogy states: "Certain periods of history required certain pedagogies. History of education shows that the type of pedagogy usually depends on the needs of the society.

- Society of the ancient times needed followers. So the training expressed in the phrases, “Do after me! Do as I do!” worked best. This pre-pedagogy produced hunters, fishermen, gatherers, warriors, etc. Nowadays, it is known as “on the job training.”
- In Ancient Greece, speakers were needed. Speakers were trained in rhetoric classes, in public discussions. Speech training pedagogies were used.
- Early capitalist society needed craftsmen and then workers. Technical schools were organized, and they employed training methodologies for technical teaching.
- Developed capitalism needed more knowledgeable professionals, like engineers, doctors, and teachers. As a response to this need, pedagogy of knowledge acquisition and testing spread to schools, colleges, and universities.
- The twentieth century put forward the need in problem solvers. Naturally, there appeared problem-oriented education as well as schools for creative problem solving. Creative pedagogy grew out of them to reflect and explain the trend.

All these types of pedagogy can be dominant at a certain time, but they do exist and coexist in contemporary education as well. This century, however, has been many times called the century of creativity and innovation, so as society matures, there are more and more creative people, and the need in educating such people is becoming more vivid."

The emergence and growth of the Creative Class is a reality. That's why there appeared Creative Pedagogy as pedagogy aiming at the upbringing of a creator (a creative person) capable of meeting the constantly growing complexity and accelerating development of the society.

Creative Pedagogy generalized the research in the field of creativity (Graham Wallas, Alex Osborn, J.P. Guilford, Sid Parnes, Ellis Paul Torrance, etc.) and put it into the classroom to improve the teaching/learning process. Creative Pedagogy is the result of applying the studies of creative process to the education process itself.

As The Encyclopedia of Creativity article on Humane Creativity states, "Creative Pedagogy, as a trend in science, generalizes and explains everything from music and art classes to creatively-oriented courses so thoroughly gathered and precisely described by Alex Osborn." Creative Pedagogy generalizes:

- art (creativity) classes
- technical creativity
- psychology of creativity
- Creative Problem Solving
- creatively-oriented courses

The next natural step after the creation of Creative Pedagogy was to check whether the theory and practice of creative teaching is teachable. Creative MetaPedagogy – the science and art of teaching teachers how to teach creatively appeared in 1990–1992.

== Some examples of the first Creative Pedagogy applications ==
- Creatively-oriented Linguistics, Military Institute, Moscow, Russia, 1984-92
- Creative Management, Center for Creative Research, Russian Academy of Sciences, Moscow, Russia, 1990-1992
- Word Origins and Usage (ENG2210), Effective Communication (COM1110), Psychology of Creativity (PSY3390), Foundations of Creative Education (EDU6625), Troy University, Montgomery, Alabama, 1994-2006.

By 2006, Creative Pedagogy and Creative MetaPedagogy in the form of numerous programs for teachers, managers, educational and business leaders, spread from the US to Pakistan, Singapore, South Africa, and Thailand. In Russia, where it was published first, it also received further development as "collective creative pedagogy" by I.P. Ivanov. A very interesting statement about the goal of creative pedagogy can be found in the work of TRIZ specialists B. Zlotin and A. Zusman, "Creative pedagogy is an attempt to replace the battle between the teacher and students with the child's struggle for self-perfection. The teacher is the child's assistant and ally in this struggle." Creative pedagogy borrowed from TRIZ one of its most powerful methods - Ideal Final Result (IFR) to create the model of Ideal Education, Ideal Teacher and Ideal Learner. Progressive journals popularize and develop the ideas of creative pedagogy. Innovative schools, like Skolkovo School, Novosibirsk, Russia, build their new programs on creative pedagogy principles.

The term Creative Pedagogy becomes well spread - it is used for monograph titles and programs names. The concept is studied and taught at the university level (see further reading list). Finally, the new encyclopedia, dedicated entirely to creative pedagogy and titled Creative Pedagogy Encyclopedia is being produced under the leadership of V.V. Popov.

The recently published article "Creative Pedagogy" in the Encyclopedia of Creativity, Invention, Innovation, and Entrepreneurship, describes the principles, methodologies, and models of creative pedagogy mentioned above. It also graphically presents how creative pedagogy together with the neighboring concept of creative andragogy create the common area that can be named Creagogy.
