= Ocean (youth camp) =

- Океан
- Founded: 1972
- Type: Educational youth camp
- Location: Near Vladivostok, Primorsky Krai, Russia

Ocean (Russian: Океан) is an educational camp for children and young people funded by the government of the Russian Federation. Ocean is an educational center for children and young people between 11 and 17 years old.

== Location ==
Ocean is located 20 kilometers away from the harbour city of Vladivostok, in the Russian Far East, near the shores of the Sea of Japan, the annual number of visitors exceeds 13,500 people. Together with the Artek and Orlyonok camps, it is one of the most important youth centers in Russia.

== History ==
On May 12, 1972, the Central Committee of the Communist Party of the Soviet Union (CPSU) decided to establish a pioneer camp for young people of the following regions: The Ural Mountains, Siberia, the Russian Far East and the Russian Arctic. In the year 1974, the construction of the Vladimir Lenin pioneer organization camp began in a forest near the city of Vladivostok. The camp construction project was designed by the architect Igor Borisovich Marikov.
