= Artek (camp) =

Children's center in Gurzuf, Crimea

- Артек
- Artek's logo in occupied Crimea since 2015

- Pavilion at the Solovyov entrance
- Formation: June 16, 1925; 101 years ago
- Location: Gurzuf, Crimea
- Coordinates: 44°33′N 34°18′E

Artek (Russian: Артек) is an international children's center (a former Young Pioneer camp) on the Black Sea in the town of Gurzuf located on the Crimean Peninsula, near Ayu-Dag. It was established on 16 June 1925 as the V. I. Lenin All-Union Pioneer Camp.

Artek was considered to be a privilege for Soviet children during its existence, as well as for children from other communist countries. During its heyday, 27,000 children a year vacationed at Artek. Between 1925 and 1969 the camp hosted 300,000 children including more than 13,000 children from 70 foreign countries. After the breaking up of the Young Pioneers in 1991 its prestige declined, though it remained a popular vacation destination.

== History ==
=== Soviet era ===
1940 documentary about Artek

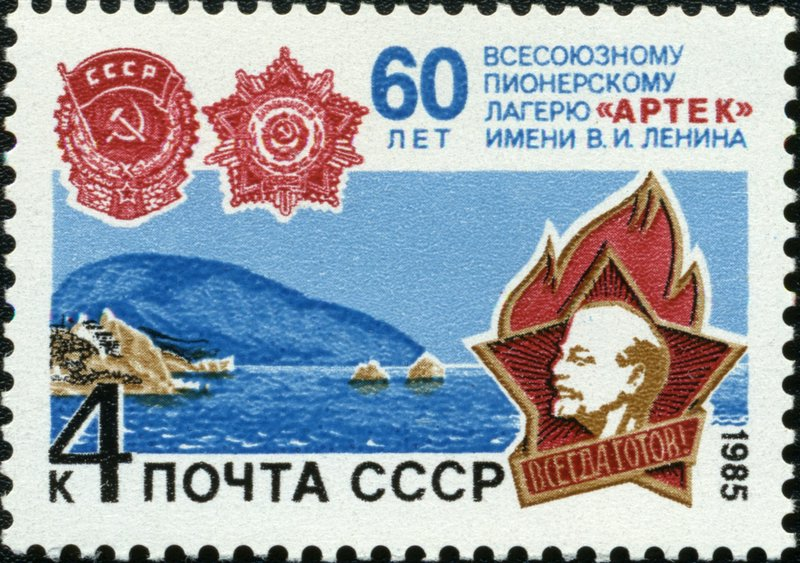
1985 USSR stamp to the 60th anniversary of Artek

The camp first hosted only 80 children but then grew rapidly. In 1969 it had an area of 3.2 km^{2} (790 acres). The camp consisted of 150 buildings, including three medical facilities, a school, the film studio Artekfilm, three swimming pools, a stadium with a seating capacity of 7,000 and playgrounds for various other activities. Unlike most of the young pioneer camps, Artek was an all-year camp, due to the warm climate.

Artek consisted of a total of ten smaller camps. Each of them had its own name: Morskoi, Lazurny, Kiparisny, etc. Four of these camps (Rechnoi, Ozyorny, Lesnoi and Polevoi) made up the notable Pribrezhny complex of Artek built between 1960 and 1964. The group of architects, led by Anatoly Polyansky, that designed Pribrezhny was awarded the USSR State Prize in architecture in 1967.

Similar distinguished pioneer camps were maintained by several Soviet republics, e.g., Orlyonok in Russian SFSR and Zubryonok on Byelorussian SSR. In East Germany the Ernst Thälmann Pioneer Organisation built a pioneer camp similar to Artek in 1952 at Werbellinsee north-east of Berlin.

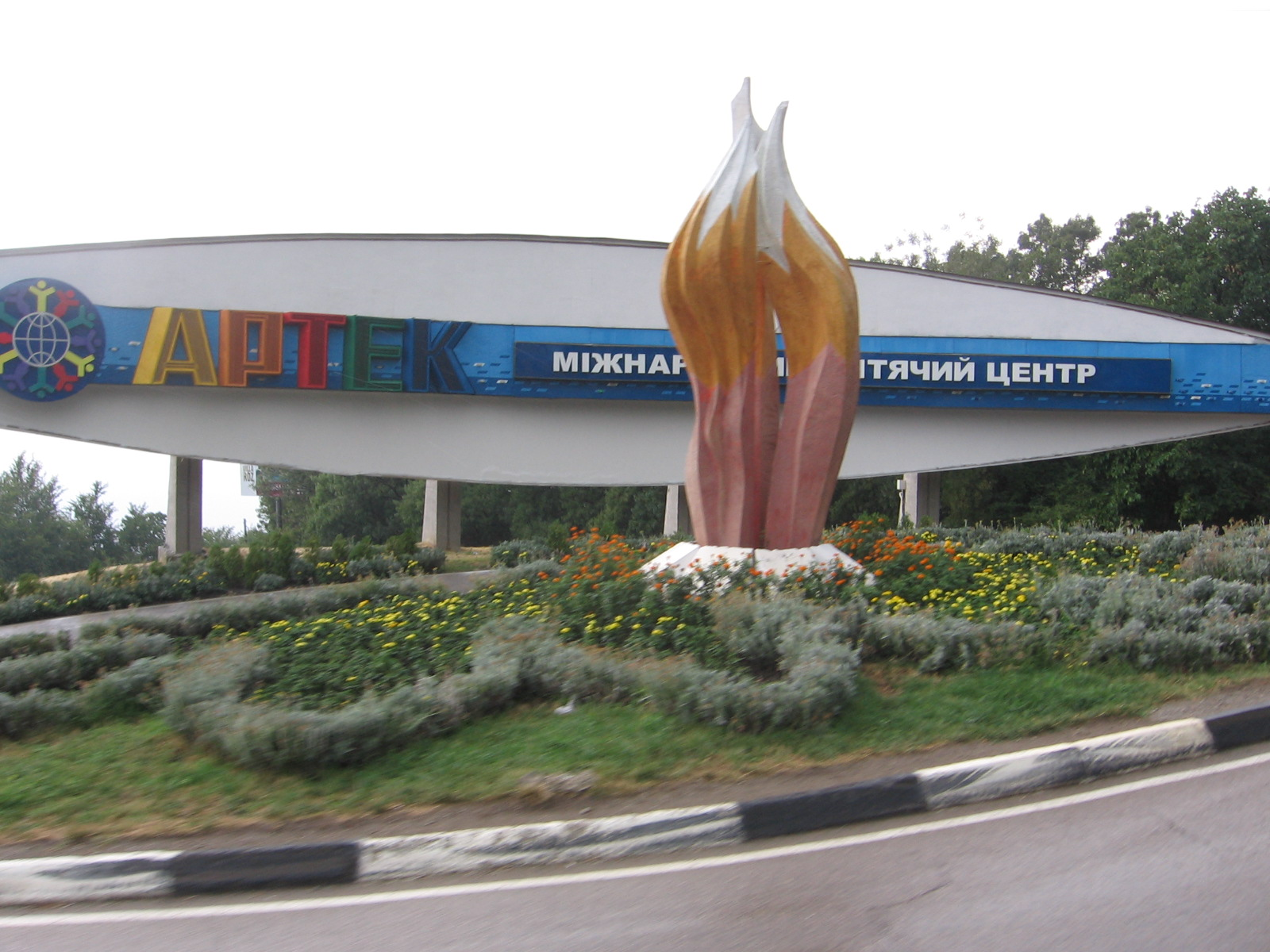
Sign by the road to Artek. Photo taken through window of inter-city Crimean Trolleybus (the 52 route).

=== 2000s ===
Artek logo while being part of Ukraine

The center was part of the Ukraine's State Management of Affairs. 60% of visitors arrive on a state subsidized or free basis. The beneficiaries are children from low income and large families, as well as orphans, handicapped and gifted children. In 2005 full prices were in the range of ₴3,000–5,000, depending on the season and location. 2007 prices were from US$770 to about $2,000.

In 2004 it was officially recognized by UNESCO as a site for the implementation of international projects and in particular during the UN Decade of Education (2005–2014).

2005 was the year of Artek's 80th anniversary and the camp hosted about 13,000 children in educational camps under the supervision of about 2,000 of volunteer squad leaders managed by permanent pedagogical staff of over 200 under the command of general director Olga Guzar (Ольга Владимировна Гузар).

Traditionally Artek provided a base (known as a School of Pedagogues-Organizers) for hands-on training of students of pedagogical schools. This tradition has been continued today and the camp is known as the Humanitarian Institute 'Artek'. In 2005 students from Ukraine, Russia, Belarus, Moldova and Kazakhstan were trained there.

As of late 2008 Artek was in financial trouble, which was solved when the Ukrainian Parliament passed laws early February 2009 writing off more than $2 million in debt (and more in unpaid taxes), barred privatization of the camp's land and obliged government agencies to pay the expenses of 15,000 children each year.

=== Artek since the 2014 Russian annexation of Crimea ===
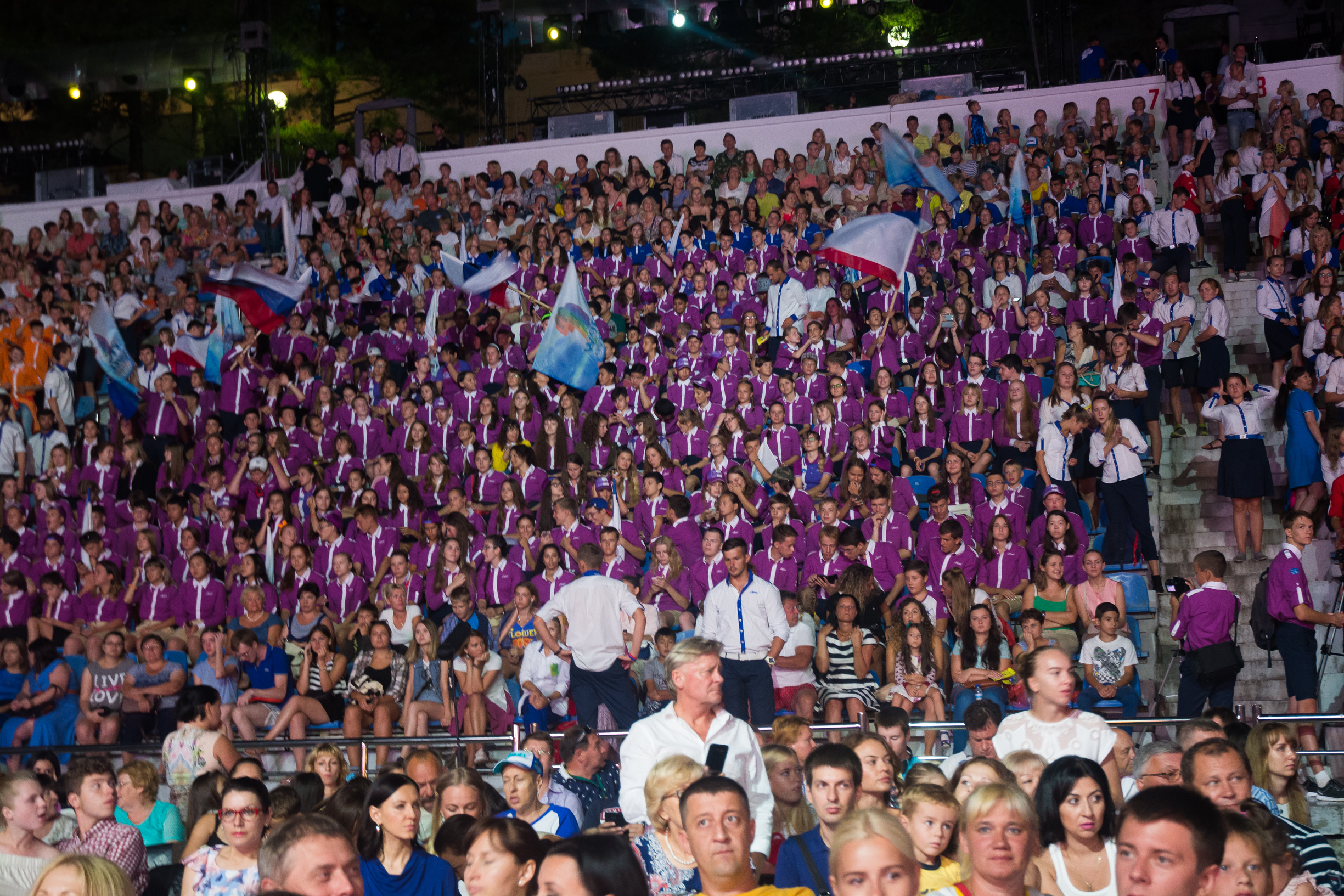
The 2016 New Wave Junior international contest for young pop music performers that was held in Artek.

Early in 2014 season, following the 2014 Russian annexation of Crimea, the staff of the camp officially moved from Crimea to Bukovel in the Carpathian Mountains. The new center there was named International Children Center "Artek-Carpathians" and consisted of three camps "Lake", "Forest" and "Mountain."

Meanwhile, the original site in Crimea remained open. In October 2014, the Russian government allocated 21 billion rubles (US$568 million) for reconstruction and development. On 16 June 2014, by the decree of the Government of the Russian Federation, the federal state budgetary educational institution "International Children's Center "Artek" was established. The functions of the founder were transferred to the Ministry of Education and Science of the Russian Federation, and a draft program for the development of the center was prepared. During the open discussion of the draft Concept, 894 expert opinions were received. In accordance with the final document which was presented on 8 October 2014 in Moscow, in addition to recreation the innovative educational activities were identified as a priority area of the center's work. In the autumn of 2014, Artek started work on the improvement of the territory, reconstruction and major buildings repairs. About 5 billion rubles were allocated from the Russian budget for the reconstruction of Artek. In 2014–2015, a large-scale reconstruction of the camp was implemented. It is included completion of unfinished buildings, construction of new buildings and other infrastructure facilities. Inside the buildings service lines were changed, new furniture was delivered, the dining room was restored, and a sports ground was equipped with wide range of sports equipment. The swimming pools were also renovated, and the camp was equipped with modern computers. On 27 February 2015, 4 buildings of the camp "Lazurny" were put into operation. There are three ways to get to Artek: for special achievements in science, culture, sports; winning a competition of a partner organization; or for an amount exceeding 80,000 rubles.

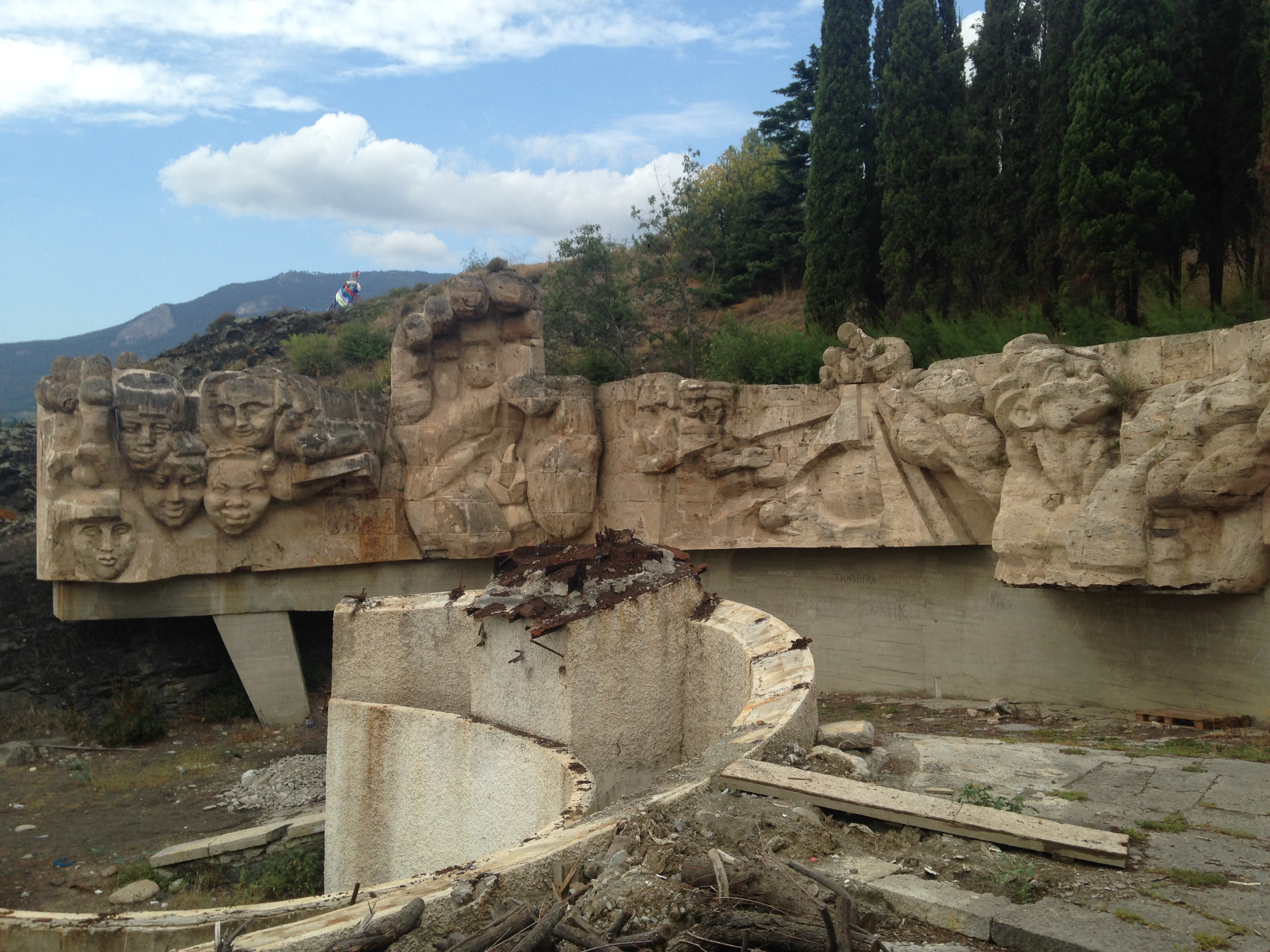
"Friendship of the Children of the World," sculpture by Ernst Neizvestny, 1967

In 2014, Artek hosted 5,854 children, in 2015 – 18,858, in 2016 – 31,200, in 2017 – 39,000, in 2018 – 40,000 children, in 2019 – 44,025 children, in 2020 – 17,287 children (reduced capacity due to the COVID-19 pandemic) from different regions of the Russian Federation and abroad. These numbers include more than 6,300 children from 87 foreign countries who visited Artek from 2014 to 2020.

== Controversies ==
In 1952, Turkish poet Nâzım Hikmet visited the Cypress camp in Artek, where he was appalled to realize he stepped on a former gravestone with a verse of the Quran facing up; years earlier, numerous Muslim cemeteries in Crimea were dismantled after the ethnic cleansing of Crimean Tatars by the Soviet regime, with the gravestones and pieces of them used as bricks. Only when Hikmet complained was that particular gravestone brick facing up removed, but for many years it was not considered objectionable by the many Soviet visitors of the camp who saw nothing wrong with stepping on the tombstone or simply ignored it.

In 2009, a criminal case was opened after several children stated they were raped in the camp. Three deputies of the Verkhovna Rada (Ukrainian parliament) and a priest are involved in this case according to BYuT Rada deputy Hryhoriy Omelchenko. On 21 May 2010, a Verkhovna Rada commission investigating these allegations was disbanded after it failed to find enough evidence to proceed.

=== Children from Russian-occupied territories ===
During the Russian invasion of Ukraine, Ukrainian children between the age of 6 and 16 from occupied parts of Ukraine were being held at the Artek camp against the will of their parents. Parents can collect the children in person, but it is either dangerous if crossing the frontline or expensive to go around via third countries. The children were being taught the Russian narrative about the war, including the claim that the Kherson and Zaporizhzhia oblasts had been annexed and were therefore parts of Russia, and that the Ukrainian-controlled parts of these oblasts were being "occupied" by Ukraine.

In October 2022, the Russian news agency TASS stated that there were around 4,500 children from the Kherson and Zaporizhzhia oblasts on Crimean summer camps during the Russian invasion of Ukraine. Russian authorities claimed that the children were being protected from the ongoing fighting. According to Ukraine's human rights ombudsman, Dmytro Lubinets, this was a part of a Russian effort to erase Ukrainian identity.

The camp was added to the sanctions list of the United Kingdom in July 2023 which accused it of being involved in the deportation of Ukrainian children during the invasion. The United States also sanctioned the camp and included its director, Konstantin Fedorenko, in the Specially Designated Nationals and Blocked Persons List, which results in his assets being frozen and U.S. persons being prohibited from dealing with him.

Furthermore, according to the Moldovan NGO Promo-LEX, as of 2025, dozens of children from Transnistria, a Russian-occupied territory of Moldova, had been sent to Artek over the past nine years through vouchers won in "patriotic competitions". Russia's invasion of Ukraine would not have stopped this; in fact, in the summer of 2023, Moldovan children from Chișinău, Congaz, Tiraspol and Ungheni attended the camp, as reported by the Russian Intellectual Center. According to Promo-LEX, the participation of children from Transnistria in Artek (as well as in Orlyonok) is one of Russia's tools for the ideological transformation and militarization of the children, ensuring their loyalty to Russia.

== In film ==
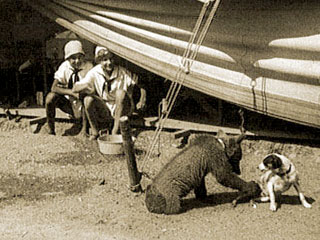
A screenshot from the 1928 film The Three

Quite a few Soviet films were shot in the camp. Some of them were about happenings in the camp, while other used its scenery for other purposes. In 1965 a special film studio, Артекфильм, Artekfilm was established.

=== Films with action in Artek ===
- 1928: The children's film The Three ("Трое") based on a screenplay by Vladimir Mayakovsky.
- 1935: The New Gulliver (a Communist retelling of Jonathan Swift's classic novel), the framing story takes place at the Artek, and the main character, Petya Konstantinov is an exemplary Pioneer boy.
- 1958: Military Secret
- 1959: The Lost Photograph
- 1962: Hello, Children!
- 1965: Pushik goes to Prague
- 1970: Passenger from the "Equator"
- 2008-2012, 2021: Svaty TV series
- 2022" Summer Time: Travel Back

=== Other films shot in Artek ===
Some scenes of the following films were shot in Artek.

- 1956: The White Poodle
- 1963: Toward the Dream
- 1967: The Andromeda Nebula
- 1957: The New Adventures of Captain Wrongel
- 1981: Per Aspera Ad Astra
- 1985: In Search for Captain Grant
- 1987: Desyat Negrityat
- 1990: The Battle of the Three Kings (film)
- 1991: Captain Blood: His Odyssey
- 1992: Hearts of Three
- 1994: Empire of Pirates
- 2005: Dunechka, Cypress camp (Кипарисный лагерь) beach

== See also ==
- Orlyonok
- Samantha Smith, the young American peace activist who visited Artek
