= Ivanov =

Ivanov, Ivanoff or Ivanow (masculine; Bulgarian: Иванов, Russian: Иванов), or Ivanova (feminine; Bulgarian: Иванова, Russian: Иванова), is one of the most common surnames in Russia and Bulgaria. The surname is derived from the male given name Ivan (related to John) and literally means "Ivan's".

In Bulgarian, "Ivanov/Ivanova" may also a patronymic part of the full name, literally meaning "Ivan's". Some persons are commonly known by their given name plus patronymic, and the latter may be mistaken for the surname.

== People with the surname ==
- Albertina Ivanova (born 1954), Mari poet
- Alena Ivanova, Kazakhstani volleyball player
- Alexander Ivanov (art collector) (born 1962), Russian art collector, art dealer and businessman
- Alexander Ivanov (singer), Belarusian-Russian singer
- Alexander Ivanov-Kramskoi (1912–1973), Russian classical guitarist
- Alexander Andreyevich Ivanov (1806–1858), Russian painter
- Alexander Gavrilovich Ivanov (1898-1984), Russian film director, director of the 1953 film The Star
- Aleksei Ivanov (footballer, born 1981), Russian footballer with FC Saturn Moscow Oblast
- Alexei Ivanov (ice hockey, born 1985), Russian ice hockey player drafted by the NHL Chicago Blackhawks
- Alexei Ivanov (ice hockey, born 1988), Kazakh ice hockey goaltender
- Alexey Ivanov (athlete), Russian Paralympic track and field athlete
- Aliaksei Ivanou (born 1980), Belarusian skier
- Alina Ivanova (born 1969), Russian race walker and long-distance runner
- Alisa Ivanova (born 1954), Russian theatre director and acting teacher
- Allen Ivanov, American mass shooter, responsible for the 2016 Mukilteo shooting
- Almaz Ivanov (died 1669), Russian statesman
- Alexander Andreyevich Ivanov (1806–1858), Russian painter
- Anatoli Ivanov (musician) (1934–2012), Russian solo-timpanist and percussionist with the Saint Petersburg Philharmonic Orchestra
- Andrey Ivanovich Ivanov (1775–1848), Russian painter (father of Alexander Andreyevich)
- Anton Ivanov-Goluboy (1818–1863), Russian painter
- Artem Ivanov (draughts player) (born 1988), Ukrainian draughts player
- Artem Ivanov (weightlifter) (born 1987), Ukrainian weightlifter
- Clement Ivanov, Estonian e-sport player known as Puppey
- Daniel Ivanov (long jumper) (born 1965), Bulgarian long jumper
- Aoiyama Kōsuke, or Daniel Ivanov (born 1986), Bulgarian sumo wrestler
- Dimitrana Ivanova (1881–1960), Bulgarian reform pedagogue, suffragist and women's rights activist
- Dmytro Ivanov (born 1989), Ukrainian footballer
- Dmitry Ivanov (born 1999), Russian activist and political prisoner
- Elena Ivanova (figure skater) (born 1979), Russian figure skater
- Elena Ivanova (sprinter), Paralympic sprinter
- Elena Ivanova (long jumper) (born 1961), Russian long jumper
- Yelena Ivanova (swimmer) (born 1963), Soviet swimmer
- Yelena Ivanova (diver) (born 1973), Kazakhstani diver
- Elena P. Ivanova, Russian biophysicist
- Georges Ivanov (1902–1979), Russian-born French singer
- Georgi Ivanov (cosmonaut) (born 1940), Bulgarian cosmonaut
- Georgi Ivanov (mayor) (born 1954), mayor of Haskovo, Bulgaria
- Georgi Ivanov (footballer, born 1967), Bulgarian footballer
- Georgi Ivanov (footballer, born 1976) or Gonzo Ivanov, Bulgarian footballer
- Georgi Ivanov (footballer, born 1980), Bulgarian footballer
- Georgi Ivanov (shot putter) (born 1985), Bulgarian shot putter
- Georgi Ivanov (wrestler, born 1989), Bulgarian wrestler
- Georgi Ivanov (wrestler, born 2002), Bulgarian wrestler
- Georgy Ivanov (1894–1958), poet of the Russian emigration
- Georgy Vasilyevich Ivanov (1901–2001), Hero of the Soviet Union
- Georgi Tsvetkov Ivanov (born 1947), Bulgarian footballer
- Gjorge Ivanov or Georgi Ivanov (born 1960), President of the Republic of Macedonia
- Grigory Ivanov (born 1971), Russian football player
- Grigory Ivanov (diver) (born 2001), Russian diver
- Igor Ivanov (actor) (born 1954), Soviet and Russian theater actor and director
- Igor Ivanov (chess player) (1947–2005), Russian-born Canadian chess player and concert pianist
- Igor Ivanov (educationist) (1923–1992), Soviet pedagogue
- Igor Ivanov (ice hockey) (born 1970), Russian ice hockey player
- Igor Ivanov (rower) (born 1931), Soviet Olympic rower
- Igor Ivanov (Scouting) (born 1976), Russian Scouting official
- Igor Ivanov (singer) (born 1953), Soviet and Russian pop singer
- Igor Ivanov Izi (born 1973), Macedonian film director and writer
- Igor Ivanov (politician, born 1937)
- Igor Ivanov (politician, born 1965)
- Ilya Ivanovich Ivanov (1870 – c. 1932), Russian biologist
- Ivan Ivanov (archer) (born 1956), Bulgarian archer
- Ivan Ivanov (badminton) (born 1966), Bulgarian badminton player
- Ivan Ivanov (cross-country skier) (born 1987), Russian cross-country skier
- Ivan Ivanov (cyclist) (born 1960), Soviet racing cyclist
- Ivan Ivanov (footballer, born 1942) (1942–2006), Bulgarian international footballer
- Ivan Ivanov (footballer, born 1988), Bulgarian footballer
- Ivan Ivanov (footballer, born 1989), Bulgarian footballer
- Ivan Ivanov (gymnast) (born 1974), Bulgarian gymnast
- Ivan Ivanov (runner) (born 1948), Soviet middle-distance runner
- Ivan Ivanov (shot putter) (born 1992), Kazakhstani shot putter
- Ivan Ivanov (sport shooter) (born 1921), Bulgarian Olympic shooter
- Ivan Ivanov (swimmer) (born 1979), Kyrgyzstani swimmer
- Ivan Ivanov (triathlete) (born 1989), Ukrainian triathlete
- Ivan Ivanov (tennis) (born 2008), Bulgarian tennis player
- Ivan Ivanov (volleyball) (born 1950), Bulgarian volleyball player
- Ivan Ivanov (weightlifter) (born 1971), Olympic weightlifter for Bulgaria
- Ivan Ivanov (wrestler, born 1937) (1937–2010), Bulgarian Olympic wrestler
- Ivan Ivanov (wrestler, born 1968), Bulgarian Olympic wrestler
- Ivan Ivanov (wrestler, born 1986), Bulgarian Greco-Roman wrestler
- Ive Ivanov, (born 1985), Croatian basketball player
- Ivo Dimitrov Ivanov (born 30 July 1966), Bulgarian businessman and co-owner of CSKA Sofia
- Ivo Ivanov (footballer, born March 1985), Bulgarian footballer who plays for Beroe Stara Zagora
- Ivo Ivanov (footballer, born April 1985), Bulgarian footballer who plays for CSKA Sofia and previously for Lokomotiv Sofia
- Kira Ivanova (1963–2001), Russian figure skater
- Konstantin Ivanov (footballer, born 1964)
- Konstantin Ivanov (poet) (1890-1915), Chuvash poet
- Konstantin Ivanov (conductor) (1907–1984), Russian conductor
- Kristo Ivanov (born 1937), Swedish information scientist and systems scientist
- Kurbat Ivanov (died 1666), Cossack explorer
- Lea Ivanova, Bulgarian singer
- Leonid Ivanov (basketball) (1944–2010), Soviet basketball player
- Leonid Ivanov (botanist), Russian botanist
- Leonid Ivanov (footballer) (1921–1990), Soviet international footballer
- Leonid Ivanov (pilot) (1909–1941), recipient of the Hero of the Soviet Union
- Leonid Ivanov (rower) (1938–2019), Soviet Olympic rower
- Leonid Ivanov (runner) (born 1937), Soviet Olympic runner
- Leonid Ivanov (test pilot) (1950–1980), Soviet cosmonaut
- Leonid Lavrovsky, born Ivanov (1905–1967), Russian ballet choreographer
- Lev Ivanov (1834–1901), Russian choreographer
- Lili Ivanova (born 1939), Bulgarian singer
- Lyubomir Ivanov, Bulgarian scientist, non-governmental activist, and Antarctic explorer
- Lyubov Ivanova (born 1981), Russian long-distance runner
- Lyudmila Ivanova (1933–2016), Soviet and Russian film and stage actress
- Mariia Ivanova (born 2003), Russian judoka
- Maxim Ivanov (politician, born 1967), Russian politician
- Maxim Ivanov (politician, born 1987), Russian politician
- Mike Ivanow (born 1948), American soccer goalkeeper
- Mikhail Dimitrov Ivanov (1900–1986), later known as Omraam Mikhaël Aïvanhov, Bulgarian philosopher and esotericist
- Mikhail Ippolitov-Ivanov (1859–1935), Russian composer and conductor
- Mikhail Matveevich Ivanov (1748–1823), Russian painter
- Mikhail Ivanov (composer) (1849–1927), Russian composer
- Mikhail Ivanov (cross-country skier) (born 1977), Russian cross country skier
- Mikhail Ivanov (rower) (born 1965), Russian rower
- Mikhail Ivanov (sledge hockey) (born 1983), Russian sledge hockey player
- Mikhail Ivanov (water polo) (born 1958), Russian former water polo player
- Mikhail Ivanov (chess player) (born 1963), Serbian-Russian chess grandmaster
- Mirela Ivanova (born 1962), modern Bulgarian poet
- Miroslav Ivanov (writer) (1929–1999), Czech non-fiction writer
- Miroslav Ivanov (footballer) (born 1981), Bulgarian footballer
- Nikita Ivanov (ice hockey) (born 1989), Kazakhstani ice hockey player
- Nikita Ivanov (politician) (born 1974), Russian politician
- Nina Ivanova (1934–2020), Russian actress
- Natalia Ivanova (taekwondo) (born 1971), Russian Olympic taekwondo competitor and medalist
- Natalya Ivanova (hurdler) (born 1981), Russian hurdler
- Natalia Ivanova (wrestler) (born 1969), Russian and Tajikistani sport wrestler
- Natalia Ivanova (sailor), Russian Olympic sailor and medalist
- Natalia Ivanova (footballer) (born 1979), Kazakhstani footballer
- Nikola Ivanov (1861-1940), Bulgarian general
- Nikolaj Ivanov (astronomer), Soviet astronomer and discoverer of asteroids
- Nikolay Ivanov (composer), film music composer, see Total Denial
- Nikolai Ivanov (entrepreneur) (1836–1906), Russian businessman
- Nikolay Ivanov (politician, born 1952), Russian politician
- Nikolay Ivanov (politician, born 1957), Russian politician
- Nikolai Ivanov (writer), (born 1956), Russian writer
- Nikolay Ivanov (footballer) (born 1980), Russian footballer
- Nikolai Ivanov (football referee) (born 1964), Russian football referee
- Nikolai Ivanov (general) (1851-1919), Russian artillery general
- Nikolai Ivanov (mathematician) (born 1954), Russian mathematician
- Nikolay Ivanov (rower) (1949–2012), Soviet Russian Olympic rower
- Nikolay Ivanov (skier) (born 1971), Kazakhstani Olympic skier
- Nikolay Ivanov (sprinter) (born 1942), Russian Olympic sprinter
- Nikolay Ivanov (volleyball) (born 1972), Bulgarian volleyball player
- Nikolai Ivanov (entrepreneur)
- Nikolai Ivanov (pilot), Soviet flying ace
- Mikalay Ivanow (born 2000), Belarusian footballer
- Nikolai Ivanov, the central character of the 1887 play Ivanov by Anton Chekhov
- Nicolas Ivanoff (born 1969), French pilot and flying instructor
- Oleksandr Ivanov (born 1965), Ukrainian football player and manager
- Olga Ivanova (disambiguation) – several people
- Olimpiada Ivanova (born 1979), Russian athlete
- Piotr Pavlovich Ivanov (1878–1942), Russian and Soviet embryologist
- Pavlo Ivanov (born 1984), Ukrainian footballer
- Porfiry Ivanov (1898–1983), Russian religious leader
- Razumnik Ivanov-Razumnik, Russian politician
- Robert Ivanov (born 1994), Finnish footballer
- Semion Ivanov (1907–1993), Soviet general
- Sergey Ivanov (Russian historian) (born 1956), Russian historian and byzantinist
- Sergey Ivanov (American football) (born 1985), American footballer
- Sergey Ivanov (painter) (1864–1910), Russian painter
- Sergei Ivanov (cyclist) (born 1975), Russian professional bicycle racer
- Sergei Ivanov (footballer, born 1964), Russian football player and referee
- Sergei Ivanov (footballer, born 1980), Kyrgyzstan footballer with FC Irtysh (as of 2008)
- Sergey Ivanov (footballer, born 1984), Russian footballer formerly with FC Zenit St. Petersburg and FC Alania Vladikavkaz
- Sergei Ivanov (footballer, born 1997), Russian footballer
- Sergey Ivanov (referee) (born 1984), Russian international football referee
- Sergey Ivanov (runner) (born 1979), Russian runner
- Sergey Ivanov (politician, born 1969), Russian politician, a deputy of the 4th, 5th, 6th and 7th State Duma
- Sergey Ivanov (Saint Petersburg politician), Russian politician
- Sergei Ivanov (Estonian politician) (born 1958), Estonian politician
- Sergei Ivanov (mathematician) (born 1972), Russian mathematician
- Sergey Ivanov (chess player) (born 1961), Russian chess grandmaster
- Sofia Ivanova (born 2005), Bulgarian rhythmic gymnast
- Stilian Ivanov, Bulgarian film director
- Trifon Ivanov (1965–2016), Bulgarian football player
- Valentin Ivanov (astronomer) (born 1967), Bulgarian astronomer
- Valentin Ivanov (footballer, born 1934) (1934–2011), Soviet football player and coach
- Valentin Ivanov (footballer, born 1961), Soviet football player and Russian referee
- Valentin Ivanov (footballer, born 2000), Bulgarian footballer
- Valentin Ivanov (wrestler) (born 1966), Bulgarian Olympic wrestler
- Valentin Ivanov, Deputy Minister in Ministry of Economy, Energy and Tourism (Bulgaria)
- Valentina Ivanova (born 1963), Russian discus thrower
- Valērijs Ivanovs (born 1970), Latvian footballer
- Valeriy Ivanov (biathlete) (born 1969), Kazakhstani biathlete
- Valery Ivanov (philologist) (1924–2005), Soviet and Russian philologist and linguist
- Varvara Ivanova (born 1987), Russian virtuoso harpist
- Vasili Ivanov (born 1970), Russian football player
- Viktor Ivanov (born 1950), Russian politician
- Viktor Semyonovich Ivanov (1909–1968), Soviet poster artist
- Vitali Vladimirovich Ivanov (born 1976), Russian handball player
- Vitaly Ivanov (1935–2024), Soviet and Russian naval officer
- Violeta G. Ivanova, Bulgarian astronomer
- Vladimir Ivanov (badminton) (born 1987), Russian badminton player
- Volodymyr Ivanov (boxer) (born 1936), Soviet boxer who competed at the 1972 Summer Olympics
- Vladimir Ivanov (footballer, born 1973), Bulgarian football player
- Vladimir Ivanov (footballer, born 1976), Russian football player
- Vladimir Ivanov (motorcyclist) (born 1983), Russian motorcycle racer
- Volodymyr Ivanov (skier), Ukrainian cross-country skier, biathlete, sighted guide and Paralympian
- Vladimir Ivanov (speed skater) (born 1949), Soviet speed skater
- Vladimir Ivanov (sprinter) (1955–2020), Bulgarian sprinter
- Vladimir Ivanov (tennis) (born 1987), Estonian tennis player
- Volodymyr Ivanov (volleyball) (born 1940), Ukrainian volleyball player who competed for the Soviet Union
- Vladimir Ivanov (footballer, born 1976), Russian football player
- Vladislav Ivanov (footballer, born 1986), Russian footballer
- Vladislav Ivanov (footballer, born 1990), football player from Moldova
- Vladislav Ivanov (physicist) (born 1936), Soviet physicist
- Vladislav Ivanov (volleyball) (born 1987), Bulgarian volleyball player
- Volodymyr Ivanov (volleyball), Ukrainian volleyball player and Olympic gold medalist
- Vsevolod Ivanov (1895–1963), Soviet writer
- Vyacheslav Ivanov (disambiguation) – several people
- Xenophont Ivanov (1898–1967), Bulgarian veterinary scholar
- Yehor Ivanov (born 1991), Ukrainian footballer
- Yevgeny Ivanov (disambiguation) – several people
- Yulia Ivanova (disambiguation) – several people
- Yury Ivanov (disambiguation) – several people
- Zinaida Ivanova (1865–1913), Russian writer and translator
- Jerzy Iwanow-Szajnowicz (1911–1943) Greek-Polish athlete and saboteur

== Fictional characters ==
- Nikolai Ivanov, the central character of the 1887 play Ivanov by Anton Chekhov
- D. D. Ivanov, in the Macross universe
- Pola Ivanova, from the James Bond film, A View to a Kill
- Susan Ivanova, in the Babylon 5 universe
- Yuriy Ivanov, in the Beyblade anime series
- Ivanova, in Harry Potter who plays as a chaser for the Bulgarian Quidditch team
- Anton Ivanov, a playable character from the video game Zenless Zone Zero

== See also ==
- Ivanov (disambiguation), for other uses
- Ivanović (includes Ivanovich)
- Ivanoff (disambiguation)
- Ivanovsky (disambiguation)
- Ivanovski
- Ivanovo
