= Sergey Ivanov =

Sergei Ivanov (1953–2026), Head of Kremlin Chief of Staff

Sergey Ivanov may also refer to:

- Sergey Ivanov (Russian historian) (born 1956), Russian historian and byzantinist
- Sergey Ivanov (American football) (born 1985), American footballer
- Sergey Ivanov (painter) (1864–1910), Russian painter
- Sergei Ivanov (cyclist) (born 1975), Russian professional bicycle racer
- Sergei Ivanov (footballer, born 1964), Russian football player and referee
- Sergei Ivanov (footballer, born 1980), Kyrgyzstan footballer with FC Irtysh (as of 2008)
- Sergey Ivanov (footballer, born 1984), Russian footballer formerly with FC Zenit St. Petersburg and FC Alania Vladikavkaz
- Sergei Ivanov (footballer, born 1997), Russian footballer
- Sergey Ivanov (referee) (born 1984), Russian international football referee
- Sergey Ivanov (runner) (born 1979), Russian runner
- Sergey Ivanov (politician, born 1969), Russian politician, a deputy of the 4th, 5th, 6th and 7th State Duma
- Sergey Ivanov (Saint Petersburg politician), Russian politician
- Sergei Ivanov (Estonian politician) (born 1958), Estonian politician
- Sergei Ivanov (mathematician) (born 1972), Russian mathematician
- Sergey Ivanov (chess player) (born 1961), Russian chess grandmaster
