= Nikolay Ivanov =

Nikolay Ivanov, Nikolai Ivanov (Russian: Николай Иванов), or Nikola Ivanov (Bulgarian: Никола Иванов) may refer to the following notable people:

- Nikola Ivanov (1861-1940), Bulgarian general
- Nikolaj Ivanov (astronomer), Soviet astronomer and discoverer of asteroids
- Nikolay Ivanov (composer), film music composer, see Total Denial
- Nikolai Ivanov (entrepreneur) (1836–1906), Russian businessman
- Nikolay Ivanov (politician, born 1952), Russian politician
- Nikolay Ivanov (politician, born 1957), Russian politician
- Nikolai Ivanov (writer), (born 1956), Russian writer
- Nikolay Ivanov (footballer) (born 1980), Russian footballer
- Nikolai Ivanov (football referee) (born 1964), Russian football referee
- Nikolai Ivanov (general) (1851-1919), Russian artillery general
- Nikolai Ivanov (mathematician) (born 1954), Russian mathematician
- Nikolay Ivanov (rower) (1949–2012), Soviet Russian Olympic rower
- Nikolay Ivanov (skier) (born 1971), Kazakhstani Olympic skier
- Nikolay Ivanov (sprinter) (born 1942), Russian Olympic sprinter
- Nikolay Ivanov (volleyball) (born 1972), Bulgarian volleyball player
- Nikolai Ivanov (entrepreneur)
- Nikolai Ivanov (pilot), Soviet flying ace
- Mikalay Ivanow (born 2000), Belarusian footballer
- Nikolai Ivanov, the central character of the 1887 play Ivanov by Anton Chekhov
