= Kostrov =

Kostrov (Russian: Костров, from костёр meaning bonfire) is a Russian masculine surname, its feminine counterpart is Kostrova. It may refer to

- Anna Kostrova (1909–1994), Russian painter, graphic artist and book illustrator
- Dmitri Kostrov (born 1981), Russian football player
- Ermil Kostrov (ca. 1755–1796), Russian poet and translator
- Igor Costrov (born 1987), Moldovan football player
- Nikolai Kostrov (1901–1995), Russian painter, graphic artist and illustrator, husband of Anna
- Vladimir Kostrov (1935–2022), Russian poet
