= Igor Ivanov (disambiguation) =

Igor Ivanov (born 1945) is a Russian politician. Igor Ivanov may also refer to:

- Igor Ivanov (actor) (born 1954), Soviet and Russian theater actor and director
- Igor Ivanov (chess player) (1947–2005), Russian-born Canadian chess player and concert pianist
- Igor Ivanov (educationist) (1923–1992), Soviet pedagogue
- Igor Ivanov (ice hockey) (born 1970), Russian ice hockey player
- Igor Ivanov (rower) (born 1931), Soviet Olympic rower
- Igor Ivanov (Scouting) (born 1976), Russian Scouting official
- Igor Ivanov (singer) (born 1953), Soviet and Russian pop singer
- Igor Ivanov Izi (born 1973), Macedonian film director and writer
- Igor Ivanov (politician, born 1937)
- Igor Ivanov (politician, born 1965)
