= Vladimir Ivanov =

Vladimir Ivanov or Volodymyr Ivanov may refer to:

== Sportspeople ==
- Vladimir Ivanov (badminton) (born 1987), Russian badminton player
- Volodymyr Ivanov (boxer) (born 1936), Soviet boxer who competed at the 1972 Summer Olympics
- Vladimir Ivanov (footballer, born 1973), Bulgarian football player
- Vladimir Ivanov (footballer, born 1976), Russian football player
- Vladimir Ivanov (motorcyclist) (born 1983), Russian motorcycle racer
- Volodymyr Ivanov (skier), Ukrainian cross-country skier, biathlete, sighted guide and Paralympian
- Vladimir Ivanov (speed skater) (born 1949), Soviet speed skater
- Vladimir Ivanov (sprinter) (1955–2020), Bulgarian sprinter
- Vladimir Ivanov (tennis) (born 1987), Estonian tennis player
- Volodymyr Ivanov (volleyball) (born 1940), Ukrainian volleyball player who competed for the Soviet Union
- Vladimir Ivanov (footballer, born 1976), Russian football player

== Politicians ==
- Vladimir Ivanov (politician, born 1971), Russian politician
- Vladimir Ivanov (politician, born 1893) (1893–1938), Uzbek SSR leader
- Volodymyr Ivanov (politician, born 1982), member of the parliament of Ukraine, 2019–2023
- Volodymyr Ivanov (politician, born 1953), Ukrainian politician

== Others ==
- Vladimir Ivanov (engineer) (1920-1996), Russian radio engineer
- Vladimir Ivanov (filmmaker) (born 1945), Russian filmmaker, director of Moscow Pride '06
- Vladimir Ivanow (orientalist) (1886–1970), Russian orientalist
- Vlad Ivanov (born 1969), Romanian actor, known for 4 Months, 3 Weeks and 2 Days
