= George Ivanov =

George Ivanov may refer to:

- Georgi Ivanov (disambiguation)
- George Ivanov (poet) (1894–1958)
- Gjorge Ivanov (born 1960), Macedonian politician and the President of the Republic of Macedonia since 2009
- Georges Ivanov (1902–1979), Russian-born French singer "Chante La Vieille Russie"
