= Georgi Ivanov =

Georgi Ivanov may refer to:

- Georges Ivanov (1902–1979), Russian-born French singer
- Georgi Ivanov (cosmonaut) (born 1940), Bulgarian cosmonaut
- Georgi Ivanov (mayor) (born 1954), mayor of Haskovo, Bulgaria
- Georgi Ivanov (footballer, born 1967), Bulgarian footballer
- Georgi Ivanov (footballer, born 1976) or Gonzo Ivanov, Bulgarian footballer
- Georgi Ivanov (footballer, born 1980), Bulgarian footballer
- Georgi Ivanov (shot putter) (born 1985), Bulgarian shot putter
- Georgi Ivanov (wrestler, born 1989), Bulgarian wrestler
- Georgi Ivanov (wrestler, born 2002), Bulgarian wrestler
- Georgy Ivanov (1894–1958), poet of the Russian emigration
- Georgy Vasilyevich Ivanov (1901–2001), Hero of the Soviet Union
- Georgi Tsvetkov Ivanov (born 1947), Bulgarian footballer
- Gjorge Ivanov or Georgi Ivanov (born 1960), President of the Republic of Macedonia
