= General Ivanov =

General Ivanov may refer to:

- Georgy Vasilyevich Ivanov (1901–2001), Soviet Army major general
- Nikola Ivanov (1861–1940), Bulgarian Army general
- Nikolai Ivanov (general) (1851–1919), Imperial Russian Army artillery general
- Semyon Ivanov (1907–1993), Soviet Army general
- Sergei Ivanov (born 1953), Russian Federal Security Service colonel general
