= Ivanoff =

Ivanoff (feminine: Ivanoffa) is a surname. Notable people with the surname include:

- Serge Ivanoff (1893–1983), Russian painter
- Victor Ivanoff (1909–1990), Russian-born South African painter and cartoonist
- Juan Carlos Bacileff Ivanoff (born 1949), Argentine politician
- Nicolas Ivanoff (born 1969), French pilot and flying instructor
- Alexandre Barbera-Ivanoff (born 1973), French painter
- Jonathan Ivanoff (born 1989), Argentine footballer
- Eugene Nicolaievich Ivanoff (fl. 1920s), imposter to the Romanov family
- Nick Ivanoff (fl. 2010s), American transportation businessman

== See also ==
- Ivanoff Head, a small rocky headland, Vincennes Bay, Antarctica
- Ivanov (disambiguation)
