= Vladislav Ivanov =

Vladislav Ivanov may refer to:

- Vladislav Ivanov (footballer, born 1986), Russian footballer
- Vladislav Ivanov (footballer, born 1990), football player from Moldova
- Vladislav Ivanov (physicist) (born 1936), Soviet physicist
- Vladislav Ivanov (volleyball) (born 1987), Bulgarian volleyball player
