= Nikita Ivanov =

Nikita Ivanov may refer to:

- Nikita Ivanov (ice hockey)
- Nikita Ivanov (politician)

== See also ==
- Ņikita Ivanovs, Latvian footballer
