= Yury Ivanov =

Yury Ivanov or Yuri Ivanov may refer to

People

- Yury Ivanov (fencer) (born 1935), Soviet Olympic fencer
- Yury Ivanov (ski jumper) (born 1952), Soviet Olympic ski jumper
- Yuri Ivanov (military) (1957–2010), Russian military official
- Yuri Ivanov (footballer, born 1960), Russian footballer
- Yury Ivanov (footballer, born 1972), Kazakhstani footballer
- Yuri Ivanov (footballer, born 1982), Bulgarian footballer
- Yuri Ivanov (serial killer), serial killer
- Yuri Ivanov (speedway rider) (born 1959), Soviet speedway rider

Other

- Yury Ivanov-class intelligence ship
