= Ivanovo (disambiguation) =

Ivanovo is a city in Russia.

Ivanovo may also refer to:

- Ivanovo Oblast, a federal subject of Russia
- Ivanovo, Blagoevgrad Province, a village in Blagoevgrad Province, Bulgaria
- Ivanovo, Haskovo Province, a village in Haskovo Province, Bulgaria
- Ivanovo, Shumen Province, in Shumen Province, Bulgaria
- Ivanovo, Smolyan Province, in Smolyan Province, Bulgaria
- Ivanovo, Ruse Province, a village in Ruse Province, Bulgaria (notable for its UNESCO listed Rock-hewn Churches of Ivanovo)
- Ivanovo Municipality, a municipality in Ruse Province, Bulgaria
- Ivanovo, Croatia, a village in Viljevo Municipality, Croatia
- Ivanovo, Russia, several inhabited localities in Russia
- Ivanovo, Serbia, a village in Pančevo Municipality, Serbia
- Ivanava (Ivanovo), a town in Belarus

== See also ==
- Ivan (disambiguation)
- Ivanov (disambiguation)
- Ivanova (disambiguation)
- Ivanovsky (disambiguation)
- The Composers' House in Ivanovo
