= Yevgeny Ivanov =

Yevgeny Ivanov may refer to:

- Yevgeny Ivanov (spy) (1926–1994), Russian naval attaché and spy in London
- Yevgeni Ivanov (politician) (born 1964), Russian politician
- Evgeni Ivanov (volleyball) (born 1974), Bulgarian volleyball player
- Yevgeni Ivanov (footballer) (born 1979), Russian footballer
- Evgeni Ivanov (basketball) (born 1993), Bulgarian basketball player
- Yevgeny Nilovich Ivanov (ru) (1921–1945), Hero of the Soviet Union
