= Valery Manilov =

Russian military officer and politician (1939–2023)

- Валерий Манилов
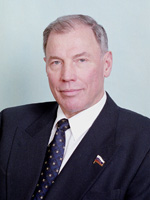
- Manilov in 2008

Member of the Federation Council of Russia for Primorsky Krai
- In office 29 August 2001 – 28 January 2004
- Succeeded by: Igor Ivanov

Personal details
- Born: Valery Leonidovich Manilov; 10 January 1939 Tulchyn, Vinnytsia Oblast, Ukrainian SSR, USSR
- Died: 1 July 2023 (aged 84) Moscow, Russia
- Education: Military Academy of the General Staff of the Armed Forces of Russia
- Occupation: Military officer

Valery Leonidovich Manilov (Russian: Валерий Леонидович Манилов; 10 January 1939 – 1 July 2023) was a Russian military officer and politician. He served in the Federation Council from 2001 to 2004.

Manilov died in Moscow on 1 July 2023, at the age of 84.

Military offices
Preceded by Nikolai Pishchev	First Deputy Chief of the General Staff of the Armed Forces of the Russian Federation; 1996–2001	Succeeded by Yuri Baluyevsky
