= Mukharbek Didigov =

Russian politician (born 1952)

Muharbek Didigov
- Мухарбек Дидигов
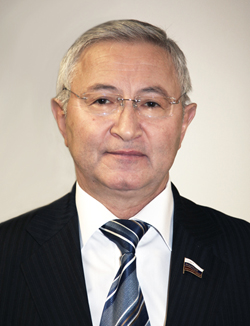

Senator from Ingushetia
- In office September 2009 – September 2011
- Preceded by: Issa Kostoyev
- Succeeded by: Nikita Ivanov
- In office 9 September 2013 – 9 September 2018
- Preceded by: Nikita Ivanov
- Succeeded by: Musa Chiliyev

Personal details
- Born: Muharbek Didigov; 21 October 1952 (age 73) Astana, Kazakh Soviet Socialist Republic, Soviet Union
- Party: United Russia
- Education: Grozny State Oil Technical University

Muharbek Ilyasovich Didigov (Russian: Мухарбек Ильясович Дидигов; born 21 October 1952) is a Russian politician who served as a senator from Ingushetia from 2009 to 2011 and again from 2013 to 2018.

== Career ==
Muharbek Didigov was born on 21 October 1952 in Astana, Kazakh Soviet Socialist Republic. He grew up in the city of Nazran, Checheno-Ingush Autonomous Soviet Socialist Republic. In 1978, he graduated from the Grozny State Oil Technical University. From 1993 to 1993, Didigov was the First Deputy Chairman of the Council of Ministers of the Ingushetia. From 1994 to 1996, he was the Prime Minister of the Republic of Ingushetia. In May 2009, he was appointed senator from the Ingushetia. On 4 December 2011, he left this position to become deputy of the People's Assembly of the Republic of Ingushetia. From 2013 to 2018, he again served as senator from Ingushetia.
