= Ivanov (disambiguation) =

Ivanov is a Bulgarian and Russian surname (article includes a list of notable people with the surname).

Ivanov may also refer to:

- Sukhoi Su-2, a Soviet airplane codenamed "Ivanov"
- Ivanov (band), French band
- Ivanov (play), by Anton Chekhov
- Ivanov (film), a 2010 Russian film

== See also ==
- Ivanova (disambiguation)
- Ivanovo (disambiguation)
