= Les Nuits sans soleil =

Single by Ivanov
- Released: 1989
- Genre: Pop
- Length: 3:40
- Label: Pathé Marconi EMI 2033357
- Songwriter(s): Patrick Laithier; Walter Troiani; Gilles Petitjean; Yves Renaud

Ivanov singles chronology
"Les Nuits sans soleil" (1989)	"Aventurier" (1990)

Music video
- "Les Nuits sans soleil" (Télé Caroline, FR3) on YouTube

"Les Nuits sans soleil" is the debut single by French band Ivanov. They released it in 1989.

The song debuted at number 47 in France during the week of 9 September 1989, climbing all the way to number seven, where it spent two non-consecutive weeks in November and December.

== Track listing ==
7" single (Pathé Marconi EMI 2033357)
No.	Title	Length
1.	"Les nuits sans soleil"	3:40
2.	"Les nuits sans soleil" (Instrumental)	3:40

== Charts ==
Chart (1989)	Peak position
Europe (European Hot 100)	32
France (SNEP)	7
