= Viktor Semyonovich Ivanov =

Soviet poster artist (1909–1968)

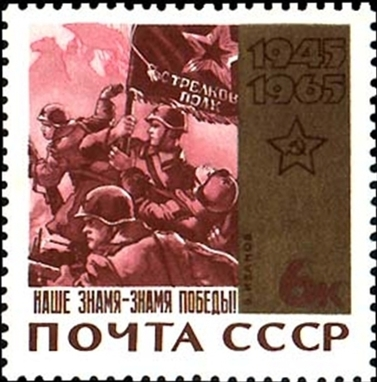
Ivanov's "Our banner is the banner of victory", on a Great Patriotic War commemorative issue stamp from 1965.

Viktor Semenovich Ivanov (Russian: Виктор Семёнович Ивано́в) (11 November 1909 - 26 November 1968) was a Soviet poster artist who worked for the TASS agency. Among his posters is the well known "Lenin lived, Lenin lives, Lenin will live forever".

Born in Moscow, Ivanov was a Meritorious Artist of the Russian Soviet Federative Socialist Republic (1955) and Corresponding Member of the USSR Academy of Arts (1958). A recognized master of political posters, he worked as a painter and artist of cinema. In 1929 he graduated from the Moscow State Technical College of Fine Arts, where he was trained at the studio of Dmitry Kardovsky. The same year he entered the Institute of Painting, Sculpture and Architecture of the Russian Academy of Arts in Leningrad, from which he graduated in 1933. While a student, he began working as a poster artist of Izogiz. In 1930 he worked as a film artist at Mosfilm. From 1934, he was a permanent participant in all-Russian, all-Union and international exhibitions.
