= Xenophont Ivanov =

Bulgarian academic and veterinarian

- Veterinary scholar
- Born: 6 September 1898; Rousse, Bulgaria
- Died: 22 January 1967; Sofia, Bulgaria

Xenophont Andreev Ivanov (Bulgarian: Ксенофонт Андреев Иванов) (6 September 1898 – 22 January 1967) was a Bulgarian veterinary scholar of pathological morphology.

He earned a degree in veterinary medicine in Berlin in 1925. He was dean of the faculty of Veterinary Medicine from 1945 to 1948 and was the first rector of the Agricultural Academy from 1948 to 1953 in Sofia.

Ivanov was also the founding director of the Institute of Comparative Animal Pathology, which is a predecessor to today's Institute of Experimental Pathology and Parasitology. Beginning in 1952, he was a full member (academician) of the Bulgarian Academy of Sciences. He also served on the editorial board of Pathologia Veterinaria.

Ivanov's research focused on linguatulosis, sheep pox, equine infectious anaemia, bovine enzootic pneumonia, and osteomyelosclerosis in poultry.
