= Vladimir Ivanov (engineer) =

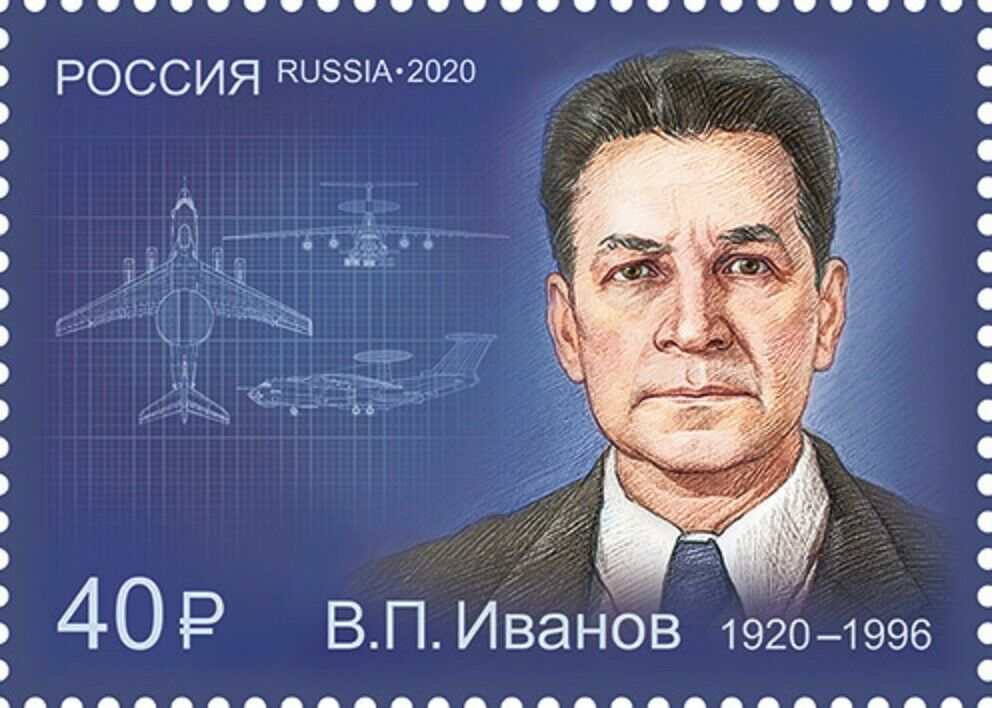
- Ivanov on a 2020 stamp of Russia
- Born: Vladimir Petrovich Ivanov; 5 June 1920; Tsaritsyn, Russian SFSR
- Died: 16 June 1996 (aged 76); Moscow, Russia
- Education: Zhukovsky Air Force Engineering Academy
- Known for: Radar altimeter for Luna 9
- Awards: USSR State Prize (1952, 1976); Order of Lenin (1971); Order of the Red Banner of Labour (1957); Order of the Patriotic War, 2nd class (1985)

Vladimir Petrovich Ivanov (Russian: Владимир Петрович Иванов; 5 June 1920 – 16 June 1996) was a Soviet and Russian radio engineer. After graduating in 1945 from Zhukovsky Air Force Engineering Academy, he spent his entire career on developing radio equipment at Moscow research institutes. Since 1979 he headed the Tikhomirov Scientific Research Institute of Instrument Design.

As a senior designer, Ivanov led the development of radar altimeter, which controlled the landing of Luna 9. Thanks to that altimeter Luna 9 became the first spacecraft to achieve a survivable landing on a celestial body (the Moon). Ivanov also developed radars for the early warning and control aircraft Tupolev Tu-126 and Beriev A-50.

He was married to Galina Ivanova (1924–2014).
