= Yulia Ivanova =

Yulia, Julia, or Yuliya Ivanova may refer to:

- Yuliya Ivanova (cross-country skier) (born 1985), Russian cross-country skier
- Yulia Ivanova (model) (born 1983), Russian beauty queen and model
- Yuliya Ivanova (rhythmic gymnast) (born 1977), Russian rhythmic gymnast
- Yuliya Zaripova (born 1986), née Ivanova, Russian middle-distance runner
- Julia Ivanova (filmmaker), Russian-born Canadian documentary filmmaker
