= Elena P. Ivanova =

Australian nanobiologist

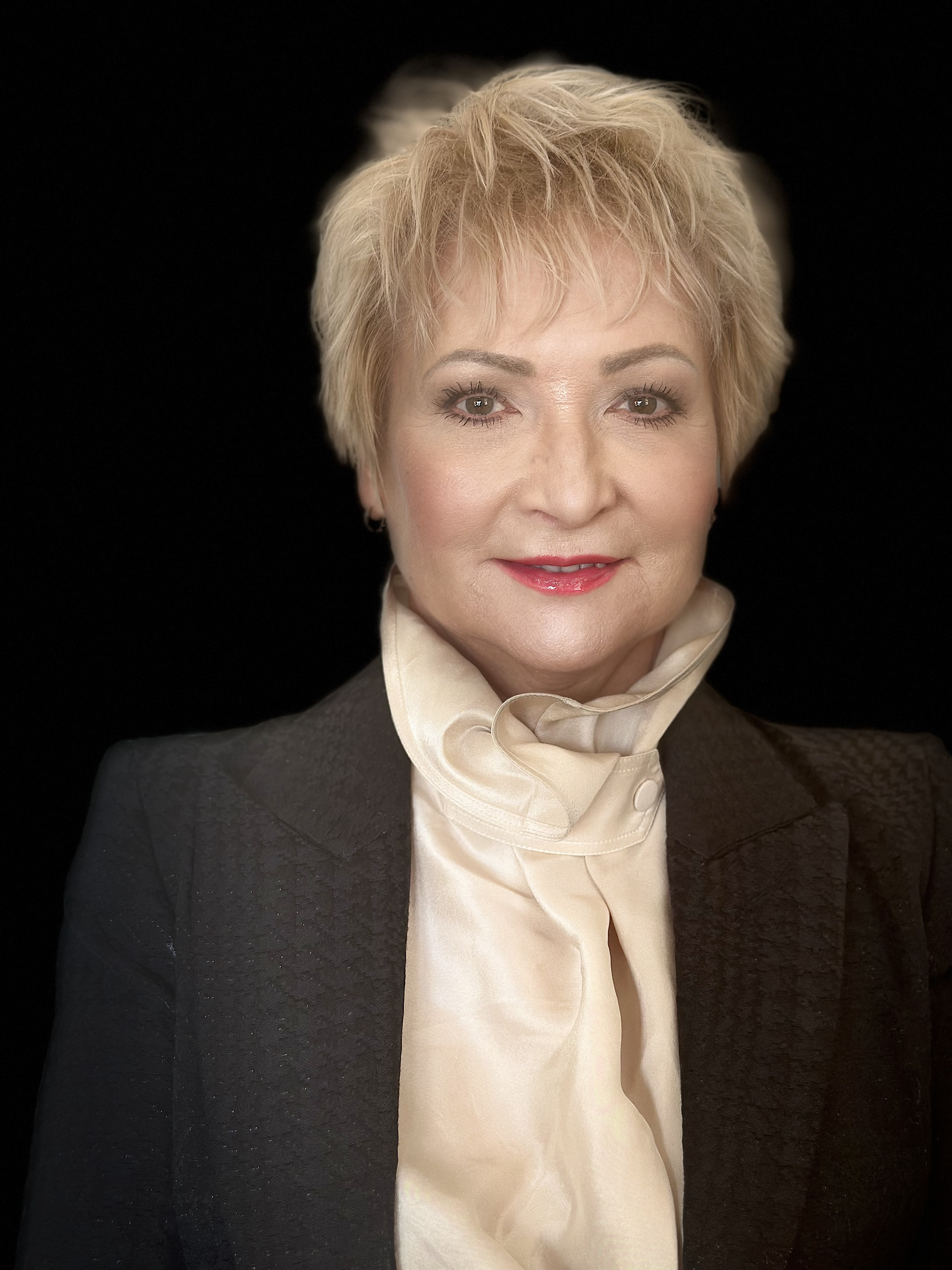
- Occupations: Nanobiotechnologist/biophysicist, academic, and author

Elena P. Ivanova is a nanobiotechnologist/biophysicist, academic, and author. She is a Distinguished Professor at RMIT University. She has conducted research on biomaterials and bioengineering.

Ivanova has authored/co-authored books, including New Functional Biomaterials for Medicine and Healthcare, Antibacterial Surfaces, and Superhydrophobic Surfaces.

== Career ==
Between 1998 and 2001, Ivanova was a senior scientist at Pacific Institute of Bioorganic Chemistry. In 2001, she joined Swinburne University of Technology as a senior lecturer, becoming associate professor and professor later. She left Swinburne to joined RMIT in 2019 as distinguished professor.

== Research ==
Ivanova works in the fields of nanobiotechnology, material science, and microbiology. As of 2025, her work has been cited 19,000 times.

She led a research project on biomimetic mechano-bactericidal nanostructured surfaces. In her studies focused on mechanical rupture of Pseudomonas aeruginosa bacterial cells by cicada Psaltoda claripennis wings, she demonstrated that upon being incubated on cicada wings, Pseudomonas aeruginosa cells are stretched and ruptured by the nanopillar arrays present on the wing surface, resulting in bacterial cell death. Her studies further showed that cicada wings are highly effective antibacterial.

== Awards and honors ==
- 2016 - Women of Swinburne, Swinburne University of Technology
- 2017 - Australian Museum Eureka for Scientific Research
- 2019 - Distinguished Professor, RMIT University

== Bibliography ==
=== Books ===
- Marine Proteobacteria of the Family Alteromonadaceae. 2001.
- Ivanova, Elena P. (2007). Nanoscale Structure and Properties of Microbial Cell Surfaces. Nova Science Publishers. ISBN 978-1-60021-242-0.
- Ivanova, Elena P.; Bazaka, Kateryna; j Crawford, R. (2014). New Functional Biomaterials for Medicine and Healthcare. Woodhead. ISBN 978-1-78242-266-2.
- Ivanova, Elena; Crawford, Russell (2015). Antibacterial Surfaces. Springer. ISBN 978-3-319-18593-4.
- Superhydrophobic Surfaces. 2015. ISBN 978-0-12-801109-6.

=== Selected articles ===
- Vu, B.; Chen, M.; Crawford, R. J.; Ivanova, E. P. (2009). "Bacterial extracellular polysaccharides involved in biofilm formation". Molecules. 14 (7): 2535–2554. doi:10.3390/molecules14072535. PMC 6254922. PMID 19633622.
- Ivanova, E. P.; Hasan, J.; Webb, H. K.; Truong, V. K.; Watson, G. S.; Watson, J. A.; Crawford, R. J. (2012). "Natural bactericidal surfaces: mechanical rupture of Pseudomonas aeruginosa cells by cicada wings". Small. 8 (16): 2489–2494. Bibcode:2012Small...8.2489I. doi:10.1002/smll.201200528. PMID 22674670.
- Webb, H. K.; Arnott, J.; Crawford, R. J.; Ivanova, E. P. (2012). "Plastic degradation and its environmental implications with special reference to poly(ethylene terephthalate)". Polymers. 5 (1): 1–18. doi:10.3390/polym5010001. hdl:1959.3/356234.
- Hasan, J.; Crawford, R. J.; Ivanova, E. P. (2013). "Antibacterial surfaces: the quest for a new generation of biomaterials". Trends in Biotechnology. 31 (5): 295–304. doi:10.1016/j.tibtech.2013.01.017. PMID 23434154.
- Ivanova, E. P.; Hasan, J.; Webb, H. K.; Gervinskas, G.; Juodkazis, S.; Truong, V. K.; Crawford, R. J. (2013). "Bactericidal activity of black silicon". Nature Communications. 4 (1): 1–7. Bibcode:2013NatCo...4.2838I. doi:10.1038/ncomms3838. PMC 3868328. PMID 24281410.
- Linklater, D. P.; Baulin, V. A.; Le Guével, X.; Fleury, J. B.; Hanssen, E.; Nguyen, T. H. P.; Ivanova, E. P. (2020). "Antibacterial action of nanoparticles by lethal stretching of bacterial cell membranes". Advanced Materials. 32 (52) 2005679. Bibcode:2020AdM....3205679L. doi:10.1002/adma.202005679. PMID 33179362.
- Linklater, D. P.; Baulin, V. A.; Juodkazis, S.; Crawford, R. J.; Stoodley, P.; Ivanova, E. P. (2021). "Mechano-bactericidal actions of nanostructured surfaces". Nature Reviews Microbiology. 19 (1): 8–22. doi:10.1038/s41579-020-0414-z. PMID 32807981.
- Linklater, D. P.; Ivanova, E. P. (2022). "Nanostructured antibacterial surfaces–What can be achieved?". Nano Today. 43 101404. doi:10.1016/j.nantod.2022.101404.
