= Ivanov (band) =

- Origin: France
- Genres: Pop
- Years active: 1989-1990
- Members: Aliocha Berman; Walter Troiaoni; Patrick Laithier; Gilles Petitjean; Yves Renaud

Ivanov is a French band, considered a one-hit wonder, composed of Aliocha Berman, Walter Troiani, Patrick Laithier, Gilles Petitjean, and Yves Renaud. The band had its greatest hit in 1989, with "Les Nuits sans soleil", which earned a Silver disc and reached number 7 on the French SNEP Singles Chart, in which it stayed for 16 weeks. The next single, "Aventurier", released in 1990, and the album Casser le destin, were not unsuccessful. The band's members were both the writers and composers of their singles.
