= Vladimir Kostrov =

Russian poet (1935–2022)

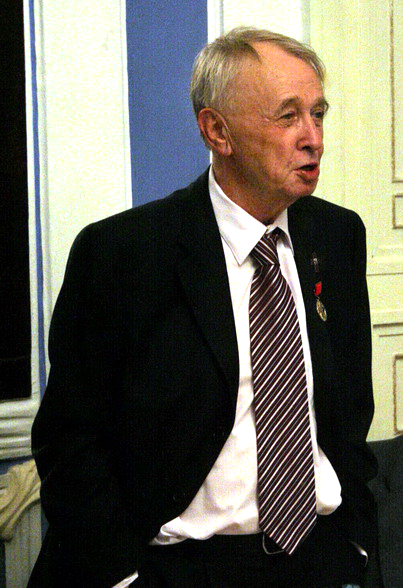
- Kostrov in 2005
- Born: Vladimir Andreyevich Kostrov; 21 September 1935; Vlasikha, Northern Krai, Russian SFSR, Soviet Union
- Died: 26 October 2022 (aged 87)
- Occupations: Poet, translator, playwright
- Writing career
- Notable work: Giordano

Vladimir Andreyevich Kostrov (Russian: Влади́мир Андре́евич Костро́в; 21 September, 1935 – 26 October, 2022) was a Soviet and Russian poet, translator and playwright. He was also a professor at the Gorky Institute of Literature in Moscow. He had been awarded the State Award of Russia (1985) and the Government Cultural Award (2006).

== Biography ==
=== Early life ===
Born Vladimir Kostrov in the Kostroma region of Central Russia, 400 km from Moscow in a small village called Vlasikha. His father, Andrey Kostrov, was a Red Army officer during the Second World War.

After completing Secondary School, Kostrov moved to Moscow. From 1953 to 1957 he studied at the Moscow State University. He published his first poem in 1957 in Youth Magazine (Юность) and his first book four years later. In 1961 he joined the Union of Soviet Writers.

=== Poet of Russian country and nature ===
Vladimir Kostrov became one of the best known poets of the 1960s in the Soviet Union—along with such writers as Andrei Voznesensky, Robert Rozhdestvensky, Yevgeny Yevtushenko—but his poems did not have political motives. He wrote about his country, nature, and simple people. His works in those times were very popular among lovers of Russian poetry. Unlike his colleagues who preferred visiting Western countries, Vladimir Kostrov liked rural Russian villages and towns. After 1960 he worked as a journalist for youth magazines- Tekhnika Molodezhi (Techniks for Youth), Smena (New Generation). In 1986 he became the deputy editor for the popular Soviet magazine – Novy Mir (New World). He also wrote the text for the musical ‘Giordano’ about Giordano Bruno, starring the famous Russian singers Valeriy Leontiev and Larisa Dolina.

=== Post-Soviet period ===
In the post-Soviet era, Kostrov discussed environmental issues and confronted Russian Democratic Writers from the alternative Union of the Writers of Russia. He published his anthology of 20th Century Russian Poetry entitled Russkaia Poeziia: XX Vek Antologiia (Russian) by Vladimir Kostrov, Gennadii Krasnikov Book, OLMA-Press (January 1999). During the 1990s and 2000s he took an active part as an organizer of the All-Russian Pushkin Memorial Days (6 June – the day Alexander Pushkin was born). For 16 years Vladimir Kostrov was the chief of Pushkin Memorial Days in the Pskov Region (near the tomb of a great Russian poet). Kostrov was the President of the International Pushkin Committee and Vice-President of the International Pushkin Foundation ‘Classic’ and professor of Russian Poetry Cathedrae Gorky Institute of Literature in Moscow.

Kostrov died on 26 October 2022, at the age of 87.

== Books ==
- Moscow Ballet's Great Russian Nutcracker by E.T.A. Hoffmann, Mark Herman, Mary Talmi, Moscow Ballet, Peter Ilich Tchaikovsky, Vladimir Kostrov (2003)
- Russkaia Poeziia: XX Vek Antologiia (Russian) by Vladimir Kostrov, Gennadii Krasnikov Book, OLMA-Press (January 1999)
