= Olga Ivanova =

Olga Ivanova may refer to:

- Olga Yakovlevna Ivanova (born 1945), Russian diplomat and ambassador
- Olga Ivanova (athlete) (born 1979), Russian shot putter
- Olga Ivanova (politician) (born 1984), Estonian politician
- Olga Ivanova (rower), Russian gold medal winner at the 1971 European Rowing Championships
- Olga Ivanova (taekwondo) (born 1993), Russian taekwondo practitioner
- Olga Ivanova (tennis) (born 1977), Russian tennis player
