= Evgeni Ivanov (basketball) =

Bulgarian basketball player

No. 33 – Yambol
- Position: Small forward / shooting guard
- League: NBL

Personal information
- Born: 9 September 1993 (age 33) Yambol, Bulgaria
- Listed height: 6 ft 6 in (1.98 m)
- Listed weight: 185 lb (84 kg)

Career information
- Playing career: 2010–present

Career history
- 2010–2012: Yambol
- 2012–2014: Beroe
- 2014: Chernomorets 2014
- 2014–present: Yambol

Evgeni Ivanov (Bulgarian: Евгени Иванов) (born 9 September 1993) is a Bulgarian professional basketball player, who is currently playing for BC Yambol in the Bulgarian League, as a small forward or shooting guard. Ivanov was born in Yambol and began his career in the local team - BC Yambol. In August 2012 he signed with BC Beroe. In November 2014 he returned to BC Yambol, after a few months with Chernomorets 2014.
