= Dmitri Kostrov =

Russian footballer

Personal information
- Full name: Dmitri Gennadyevich Kostrov
- Date of birth: 5 August 1981 (age 45)
- Place of birth: Upornikovskaya, Volgograd Oblast, Russian SFSR
- Height: 1.87 m (6 ft 1 1/2 in)
- Position: Defender

Youth career
- FC Rotor Volgograd

Senior career*
Years	Team	Apps	(Gls)
1998–2000	FC Rotor-2 Volgograd	49	(0)
2000–2002	FC Rotor Volgograd	1	(0)
2003	→ FC Volgar-Gazprom Astrakhan (loan)	6	(0)
2004–2005	FC Rotor-2 Volgograd	52	(5)
2006	FC Rotor Volgograd	26	(2)
2007	FC Dynamo Bryansk	10	(0)
2008	FC Olimpia Volgograd	27	(3)
2009	FC Volgograd	22	(1)
2010	FC Tsement Mikhaylovka (D4)		
2011	FC Zvezda Ryazan	18	(2)
- * Club domestic league appearances and goals

Dmitri Gennadyevich Kostrov (Russian: Дмитрий Геннадьевич Костров; born 5 August 1981) is a Russian former professional footballer.

== Club career ==
He made his debut in the Russian Premier League in 2000 for FC Rotor Volgograd.
