= Vyacheslav Ivanov =

Vyacheslav Ivanov may refer to:

- Vyacheslav Ivanov (poet) (1866–1949), Russian Symbolist poet and philosopher
- Vyacheslav Ivanov (philologist) (1929–2017), Russian semiotician specializing among other in Indo-European studies
- Vyacheslav Ivanov (rower) (1938–2024), Russian rower who became the first three-time Olympic gold medalist in the single scull event
- Vyacheslav Ivanov (footballer) (born 1987), Ukrainian association football player
