= Upornikovskaya =

Upornikovskaya Упорниковская
- Stanitsa
- Location within Volgograd Oblast Location within Russia
- Coordinates: 50°14′N 41°50′E
- Country: Russia
- Region: Volgograd Oblast
- District: Nekhayevsky District
- Time zone: UTC+4:00

Upornikovskaya (Russian: Упорниковская) is a rural locality (a stanitsa) and the administrative center of Upornikovskoye Rural Settlement, Nekhayevsky District, Volgograd Oblast, Russia. The population was 1,197 as of 2010. There are 18 streets.

== Geography ==
Upornikovskaya is located on the Kalach Upland, on the Akishevka River, 26 km southeast of Nekhayevskaya (the district's administrative centre) by road. Pankinsky is the nearest rural locality.

== Notable people ==
- Dmitri Kostrov (born 1981), Russian former professional footballer
