= Nikolai Ivanov (writer) =

Russian writer

- Николай Иванов
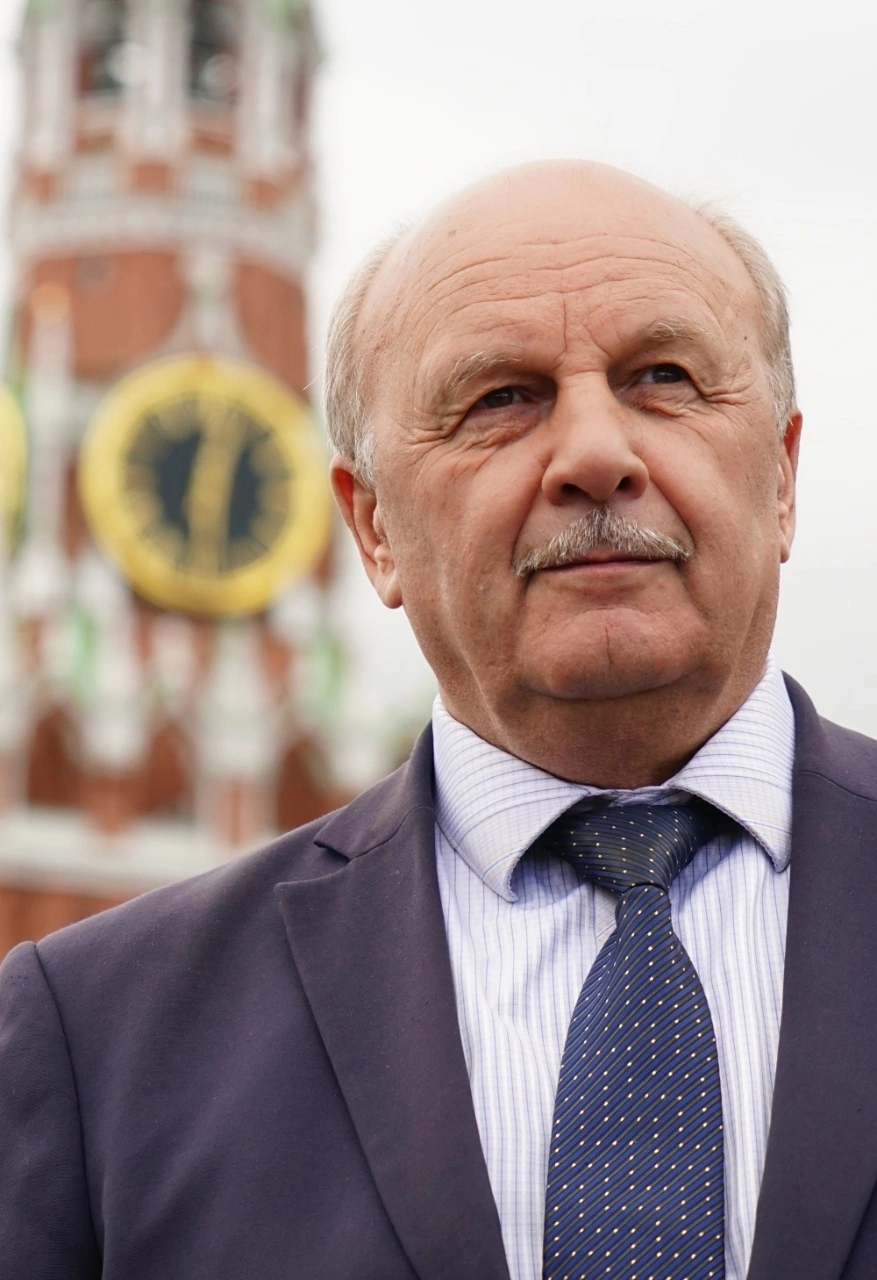

Chairman of the Union of Writers of Russia
- In office 15 February 2018 – 27 February 2025
- Preceded by: Valery Ganichev
- Succeeded by: Vladimir Medinsky

Personal details
- Born: 8 June 1956 (age 69) Strachovo, Bryansk Oblast, RSFSR
- Education: Lvov Higher Military-Political School
- Occupation: Writer, journalist

Nikolai Fyodorovich Ivanov (Russian: Николай Фёдорович Иванов; born June 8, 1956, in Strachovo, Bryansk Oblast, USSR) is a Russian writer and publicist, and chairman of the Board of the Union of Writers of Russia from February 15, 2018, to February 27, 2025.

He is the author of over 30 books of prose and drama. As a war journalist and writer, he has travelled over the years to Chechnya, Tskhinvali, Crimea, Donbass, and Syria. He is formerly the editor-in-chief of the magazine "Soviet Warrior" and the newspaper "Tax Police". He is a retired colonel in the Russian tax police, a military journalist, and a paratrooper officer. He is a member of the public organization "Bryansk Community" in Moscow. He is subject to sanctions by all EU countries for spreading Russian propaganda and disinformation about the Russian invasion of Ukraine.

== Biography ==
Nikolai Ivanov was born on June 8, 1956, in the village of Strachovo, Suzemsky District, Bryansk Oblast. The village is located on the border with Sumy Oblast. His father, Fyodor Agapevich (1925–2006), was a veteran of World War II, a Red Army sergeant, and commander of a Maxim machine gun crew. He served in the East Prussian Offensive with the 63rd Rifle Division and was wounded near Königsberg. After the war, he worked as an electrician on a collective farm and as a rural correspondent for a regional newspaper. His mother, Anna Grigoryevna, was a partisan during the Great Patriotic War and later worked as an elementary school teacher. His grandfather served as a commissar for a partisan detachment during the Great Patriotic War and was killed in 1943 during the breakthrough of the encirclement during the Battle of Kursk.

Nikolai was the fourth child in his family; his older brothers were Viktor and Alexander, and his sister, Tatyana. His younger brother, Sergei, died at age 40.

He completed his secondary education at a rural school in the Suzemsky District. In 1971, as an eighth-grader, he considered enrolling in the Suvorov Military School. He passed his medical examination in Bryansk, after which he was accepted to the Moscow Suvorov Military School.

The school offered a two-year program. In his second year, in March 1973, while choosing a school to continue his military education, he applied for admission to the Lvov Higher Military-Political School, in the military journalism department. At the time, it was the only school in the USSR training military journalists, with 60 students annually.

In 1973, he was sent to the Lvov Higher Military-Political School, in the journalism department. According to his own recollections, his first Guard duty was assigned to guard the "Motherland" monument (Lvov) on Gvardeyskaya Street.

While studying at the Lviv Military Academy, he attempted his first prose work—the short story "Cornflowers and Daisies" won a literary competition at the school.

In the spring of 1977, he graduated from the Lvov Higher Military-Political School with the rank of lieutenant. According to his own recollections, after graduating from the journalism department of the Lviv Military Academy, he was sent to serve in the airborne troops for sloppiness.

In 1991, he was appointed editor-in-chief of the magazine "Soviet Warrior", published by the Ministry of Defense's Voenizdat publishing house. The editorial office was located on Khoroshevskoye Avenue in Moscow. Ivanov succeeded Colonel Leonid Golovnev in this position. However, in the double issue for February–March 1992, Golovnev was still listed as editor.

In 1992, when neither the Soviet Union nor the Soviet Armed Forces existed, the magazine continued to be published under its previous name. By order of Russian Defense Minister Pavel Grachev, the editorial board was required to change the name. Ivanov was reluctant, but he was forced to agree to the change—"Soviet Warrior" was renamed "I Have the Honor", with both titles appearing on the cover.

In early 1993, the magazine began publication with a several-month delay due to lack of funding. In October 1993, Ivanov refused to publish materials supporting the White House attack and submitted a letter of resignation from his position as editor-in-chief, which was accepted. Ivanov was also dismissed from the Russian Armed Forces for "low moral character" and ended his service with the rank of lieutenant colonel.

In the 1990s he continued his service in the Russian Tax Police. The Tax Police Department of the Russian Federation was established in October 1993. He became a Colonel of the Tax Police (since 1993).

During a mission to Chechnya in June 1996, he was captured by militants, where he endured the horrors of underground prisons, repeated executions, and being thrown alive into graves. He was released four months later as a result of a special operation led by Colonel Yevgeny Raskhodchikov, head of the Federal Tax Police Serice's physical protection department.

He served as the first editor of the newspaper "Tax Police".

Two years later, he returned to the North Caucasus, where he participated in the founding of the newspaper "Free Chechnya" and served as deputy editor-in-chief. The newspaper was published in federally controlled areas of the republic.

In 2000, he helped organize a visiting plenary session of the Union of Writers of Russia in Gudermes. He also participated in trips for creative groups (writers, artists, and actors) to border outposts in Mozdok, Shatoy, and Starye Atagi to visit fellow countrymen—a joint detachment of the Bryansk police.

After the disbandment of the Russian Tax Police in 2002, he retired from the force. He ended his service with the Tax Police as the head of the Administrative Practice Service. During his service, he published several books about the tax police: "Maroseyka 12. Urgent", "Tax Police Department", "Outdoor" and "Don't Look for Us in Paradise".

=== Post-service ===
He worked for a time at the Rosavtodor news agency (the magazine "Roads of Russia in the 21st Century"), and since 2005 as the press secretary for the State Unitary Enterprise "Dorinvest", a company that maintains Moscow's urban roads, and for the magazine "Podmoskovie".

In the summer of 2002, during the Flooding in the North Caucasus, Ivanov set up a Rosavtodor press center in Stavropol. He subsequently published the book "The Caucasus: Taming the Elements".

In 2003, Ivanov traveled from Chita to Khabarovsk along the Amur Highway, which was under construction. Following this trip, he published the book "Amur Gathers Russia: Construction of the Chita-Khabarovsk Highway" that same year.

In 2005, he again received the Eduard Volodin Imperial Culture Prize in the "Biography" category for his book of essays about the Bryansk partisans, "Let's Bow to Those Great Years."

Since 2007, he has been one of the instructors at the "Bastion" special training course for journalists working in extreme conditions and hot spots. He conducts a master class for course participants as a former hostage. The "Bastion" training and practical courses were developed by the Union of Journalists of Moscow and the Military Press Association in conjunction with the press service of the Russian Ministry of Defence and have been held since May 2006.

In August 2008, during the Russo-Georgian War, he left Moscow as a special correspondent for the magazine "Podmoskovye" (Moscow Oblast). He traveled to Tskhinvali as part of the first convoy of Russian Emergencies Ministry vehicles carrying Russian humanitarian aid. He was subsequently awarded the "Thank You" badge by Governor of Moscow Oblast, Boris Gromov.

In 2009, he organized a visiting plenary session of the Union of Russian Writers in South Ossetia and Beslan, North Ossetia, on the fifth anniversary of the Beslan terrorist attack.

In 2013, he received the Yulian Semyonov Prize for extreme geopolitical journalism.

In early March 2014, immediately after the occupation of Crimea by unmarked Russian troops, Nikolai Ivanov and Alexander Bobrov, by decision of the board of the Union of Russian Writers, flew from Moscow to Simferopol to support writers of the Autonomous Republic of Crimea and the city of Sevastopol who participated in the pro-Russian protests. They met with Tatyana Voronina, chairperson of the Crimean branch of the Union of Russian Writers.

In December 2014 Nikolai Ivanov visited Luhansk, which was controlled by separatists from the Russian-controlled Luhansk People's Republic. He traveled from Moscow to Luhansk with the tenth convoy of the Russian Ministry of Emergency Situations carrying Russian humanitarian aid.

In 2019, Nikolai Ivanov was awarded two medals from the Ministry of Defense: "For the Return of Crimea" and "Participant in the Military Operation in Syria".

He expressed support for Russian invasion of Ukraine on February 24, 2022. The letter Z was hung on the facade of the Chef's house on Komsomolsky Prospekt in Moscow, which houses the Union of Writers of Russia.

In July 2022, First Deputy Chief of Staff of the Presidential Administration of Russia, Sergei Kiriyenko presented Nikolai Ivanov with the Order of Friendship in the Kremlin.

By Decree No. 832 of the President of the Russian Federation dated November 17, 2022, he was appointed to the Presidential Council for the Development of Civil Society and the Rights of the People.

=== Chairman of the Writers' Union ===
On August 17, 1992, he was accepted into the USSR Writers' Union. He was recommended by Ivan Stadnyuk, who was his director at the War Writers' Studio.

Secretary of the Board of the Union of Russian Writers.

Since 2013, he has been one of the co-chairs of the Board of the Union of Russian Writers and the General Director of the Union of Russian Writers.

Since December 2016, he has served as Acting Chairman of the Union of Russian Writers.

On February 15, 2018, at the 15th Congress of the Union of Russian Writers, Nikolai Ivanov was elected chairman of the board for a five-year term. With 126 votes in favor and 28 against, he decisively defeated his only rival, writer Sergey Shargunov. In 2019, he expressed his intention to reestablish contacts with the leaders of the Union State and revitalize the Belarusian-Russian literary journal Belaya Vezha. He was one of the initiators of the creation of a unified Union of Writers of the Union State.

In August 2022, he was awarded the Valentin Rasputin Prize.

On February 10, 2023, at the 16th Congress of the Union of Russian Writers, he was unanimously (with 155 votes in favor) re-elected for a second term as chairman of the Board of the Union of Russian Writers.

In 2024, he joined the Presidential Council for Culture and Art.

== Awards ==
- Order of Friendship (February 21, 2022) — for significant contribution to the development of Russian culture and art, and long-term fruitful activity;
- Order "For Service to the Homeland in the Armed Forces of the USSR", 3rd class;
- Order of Friendship of the DPR (September 27, 2019) — for significant personal contribution to the formation of a unified cultural space and the preservation of the historical and cultural heritage of Donbass;
- Medal of the Order "For Merit to the Fatherland", 2nd class (2023) — for dedication, personal contribution to supporting the moral and psychological state and strengthening the fighting spirit of participants in a special military operation;
- Medal "For Courage";
- Medal "For the Return of Crimea"
- Medal "Participant of the military operation in Syria";
- Badge of the Central Committee of the All-Union Leninist Young Communist League "Military Valor";

Laureate of the literary prizes named after Nikolai Ostrovsky, M. Bulgakov, "Stalingrad," the Federal Security Service, "The Golden Pen of the Border," and others;

- Honorary Citizen of the Suzemsky District of the Bryansk Oblast;
- "For Service in the Caucasus" Badge, awarded by the leadership of the Bryansk Oblast Directorate of the Ministry of Internal Affairs in 2013;
- Russian Federation Presidential Certificate of Gratitude (June 6, 2024) for active participation in the preparation and holding of socially significant events.
- Yulian Semenov Prize in Extreme Geopolitical Journalism (2013).
