= Chef's house (Moscow) =

Historical place in the Khamovniki district

Coordinates: 55.7301°N 37.5892°E

- Шефский дом
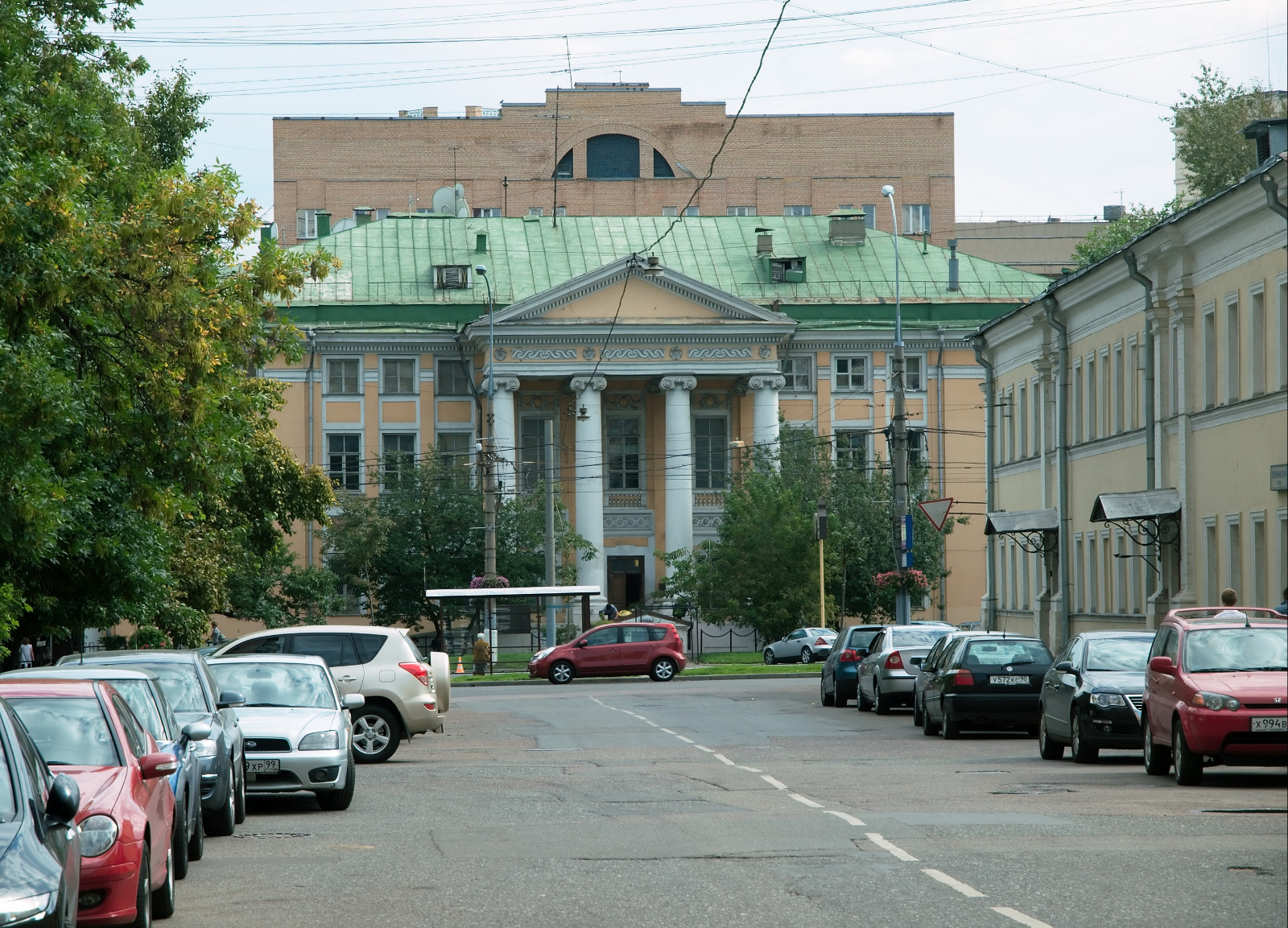
- View from Ksenyinsky Lane
- Location: Moscow, Komsomolskiy prospect, 13

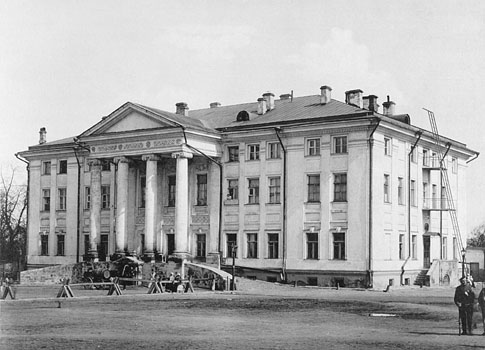
Chef's house in the beginning of XX century

Chef's house (Russian: Ше́фский дом) or Tames house (Russian: Тамесов дом) is a historic building in the Khamovniki district in Moscow (Komsomolsky Avenue, house 13). It was built in the late 18th century on the basis of chambers built earlier that century. It is part of the Khamovniki barracks complex. The Chef's House is built in classical style and is an object of cultural heritage of federal significance.

== History ==
At the beginning of the 18th century, the chambers of the estate of A. F. Lopukhin were built on this site. They were wooden mansions on stone cellars, connected with a mezzanine hallway. In 1718, the manor was bought by the Dutchman I. P. (John) Tames, the director of the nearby Khamovnicheskaya linen manufactory. In the 1770s and 1780s, a new house was built "on the cellars" of the old chambers, on the initiative of I. I. Tames. In the beginning of the 19th century, the house was included in the newly built Khamovnichesky barracks complex. It was called the Chef's House because it was intended for the quartering of officers and the chief (honorary commander) of the regiment. In 1817–1818 the Decembrists N. M. Murav'ev, S. I. Murav'ev-Apostol, M. I. Murav'ev-Apostol, M. A. Fonvizin, and F.P., gathered in the house of Colonel AN Muravyov, who lived in the Chef's House.

In 1970, the building housed the reign of the Union of Writers of the RSFSR. Now the building is occupied by the Union of Writers of Russia.

== Architecture ==
The house is built in the spirit of early Moscow classicism. The front facade is decorated with a four-columned portico with two ramp-entrances on its sides. The facade features minimal architectural decoration, but does feature blades and vertical niches. It is painted in three colors: white, yellow and red-ochre.

The original proportions of the mansion were violated after the windows of the third floor were cut in the frieze. The windows of the first and second floors have also been extended.
