= Jonathan Ivanoff =

Argentine footballer (born 1989)

Personal information
- Full name: Jonathan Yamil Alexis Ivanoff
- Date of birth: 14 May 1989 (age 37)
- Place of birth: Quitilipi, Argentina
- Height: 1.92 m (6 ft 4 in)
- Position: Goalkeeper

Youth career
- Juventud Cooperativista Quitilipi
- Centenario de Venado Tuerto
- 2003–2008: Sarmiento

Senior career*
Years	Team	Apps	(Gls)
2008–2013	Sarmiento	5	(0)
2013–2015	Independiente Chivilcoy	64	(0)
2016–2017	Sportivo Las Parejas	24	(0)
2017–2018	Chaco For Ever	0	(0)
2018–2019	Deportivo Riestra	0	(0)
2019	Juventud Unida 25 de Mayo		
2021	El Linqueño		
- * Club domestic league appearances and goals

Jonathan Yamil Alexis Ivanoff (born 14 May 1989) is an Argentine professional footballer who plays as a goalkeeper.

== Career ==
Ivanoff began in the youth of Juventud Cooperativista Quitilipi and Centenario de Venado Tuerto, before joining Sarmiento in 2003. He was a senior for five years from 2008, notably making five appearances in Primera B Metropolitana as they won the league title in 2011–12. June 2013 saw Ivanoff join Independiente. Twenty-four matches followed for him in Torneo Argentino B, in a campaign which the club ended with promotion. He featured forty times across the following two seasons, prior to moving across the division in January 2016 after agreeing terms with Sportivo Las Parejas.

His debut came in February versus Libertad. In August 2017, Ivanoff joined fellow third tier team Chaco For Ever; after a failed medical stopped him signing for Sportivo Desamparados. He didn't appear for the club in 2017–18. At the conclusion of the aforementioned season, Ivanoff departed to join Deportivo Riestra. Like with Chaco For Ever, the goalkeeper didn't participate in a competitive match in 2018–19; though was on the substitutes bench three times. In September 2019, Ivanoff revealed he had joined Juventud Unida de 25 de Mayo of Liga Veinticinqueña.

== Career statistics ==
As of 16 September 2020.

Appearances and goals by club, season and competition
Club	Season	League			Cup		League Cup		Continental		Other		Total	
Club	Season	Division	Apps	Goals	Apps	Goals	Apps	Goals	Apps	Goals	Apps	Goals	Apps	Goals
Sarmiento	2012–13	Primera B Nacional	0	0	0	0	—		—		0	0	0	0
Independiente	2013–14	Torneo Argentino B	24	0	0	0	—		—		0	0	24	0
Independiente	2014	Torneo Federal A	13	0	0	0	—		—		0	0	13	0
Independiente	2015	Torneo Federal A	27	0	0	0	—		—		0	0	27	0
Independiente	Total		64	0	0	0	—		—		0	0	64	0
Sportivo Las Parejas	2016	Torneo Federal A	9	0	0	0	—		—		0	0	9	0
Sportivo Las Parejas	2016–17	Torneo Federal A	15	0	2	0	—		—		0	0	17	0
Sportivo Las Parejas	Total		24	0	2	0	—		—		0	0	26	0
Chaco For Ever	2017–18	Torneo Federal A	0	0	0	0	—		—		0	0	0	0
Deportivo Riestra	2018–19	Primera B Metropolitana	0	0	0	0	—		—		0	0	0	0
Career total			88	0	2	0	—		—		0	0	90	0

== Honours ==
Sarmiento

- Primera B Metropolitana: 2011–12
