= Yuri Ivanov (footballer, born 1960) =

Russian footballer

Personal information
- Full name: Yuri Igorevich Ivanov
- Date of birth: 8 August 1960 (age 66)
- Height: 1.87 m (6 ft 1 1/2 in)
- Position: Defender

Youth career
- FC Iskra Moscow

Senior career*
Years	Team	Apps	(Gls)
1978–1980	FC Spartak Moscow	0	(0)
1981	FC Znamya Truda Orekhovo-Zuyevo	14	(0)
1981	PFC CSKA Moscow	2	(0)
1981	FC Narimanovets Khorezmskaya Oblast	18	(1)
1982	FC Moskvich Moscow	27	(2)
1983	FC Zorky Krasnogorsk	27	(2)
1984–1985	FC Dynamo Kashira	60	(9)
1986	FC Dynamo Vologda	28	(6)
1987	FC Zorky Krasnogorsk	29	(8)
1988	FC Kairat	21	(0)
1988	FC Meliorator Chimkent	1	(0)
1989	FC Traktor Pavlodar	36	(5)
1990–1991	FC Daugava Riga	62	(3)
1991	TPS	9	(2)
1992	FC Kuban Krasnodar	7	(0)
1993	FC Oulu	16	(1)
1994	FC Astrateks Astrakhan	13	(0)
1994	FC Torgmash Lyubertsy	3	(0)
1995	FC Krasnogvardeyets Moscow	10	(3)
2006	FC KAIT-sport Moscow		
- * Club domestic league appearances and goals

Yuri Igorevich Ivanov (Russian: Юрий Игоревич Иванов; born 8 August 1960) is a former Russian football player.
