= Vladimir Ivanov (footballer, born 1976) =

Russian footballer

Personal information
- Full name: Vladimir Yuryevich Ivanov
- Date of birth: 9 February 1976 (age 50)
- Height: 1.82 m (5 ft 11 1/2 in)
- Positions: Defender; midfielder; forward

Senior career*
Years	Team	Apps	(Gls)
1995–1996	FC Gornyak Kachkanar	37	(3)
1997	FC UralAZ Miass	8	(0)
1997	FC Gornyak Kachkanar	16	(3)
1998–1999	FC UralAZ Miass	58	(4)
2000–2001	FC Nosta Novotroitsk	45	(3)
2002–2005	FC Sodovik Sterlitamak	129	(34)
2006–2016	FC Chelyabinsk	262	(22)
- * Club domestic league appearances and goals as of 31 May 2016

Vladimir Yuryevich Ivanov (Russian: Владимир Юрьевич Иванов; born 9 February 1976) is a former Russian professional football player.

Ivanov played in the Russian First Division with FC Nosta Novotroitsk.

== Honours ==
- Russian Second Division Zone Ural/Povolzhye best midfielder: 2005.
