= Nikolay Ivanov (footballer) =

Russian footballer

Personal information
- Full name: Nikolay Vasilyevich Ivanov
- Date of birth: 14 June 1980 (age 46)
- Place of birth: Yelets, Russian SFSR
- Height: 1.81 m (5 ft 11 1/2 in)
- Positions: Defender; midfielder

Senior career*
Years	Team	Apps	(Gls)
1998	FC Anapa	12	(0)
1999–2000	FC Torpedo-2 Moscow	54	(2)
2001	FC Torpedo Moscow	0	(0)
2002–2005	FC Metallurg Lipetsk	101	(3)
2006	FC Sodovik Sterlitamak	34	(2)
2007–2009	FC Metallurg Lipetsk	74	(14)
2009	FC Volgar-Gazprom-2 Astrakhan	11	(0)
2010–2011	FC Gazovik Orenburg	35	(3)
2012	FC Tyumen	8	(0)
2012–2015	FC Vityaz Podolsk	50	(3)
- * Club domestic league appearances and goals

Nikolay Vasilyevich Ivanov (Russian: Никола́й Васи́льевич Ивано́в; born 14 June 1980) is a former Russian professional association football player.

== Club career ==
Ivanov has two spells with FC Metallurg Lipetsk in the Russian Football National League and Russian Second Division, from 2002 until 2005 and from 2007 until 2009.
