= Nikita Ivanov (politician) =

Russian politician (born 1974)

- Никита Иванов
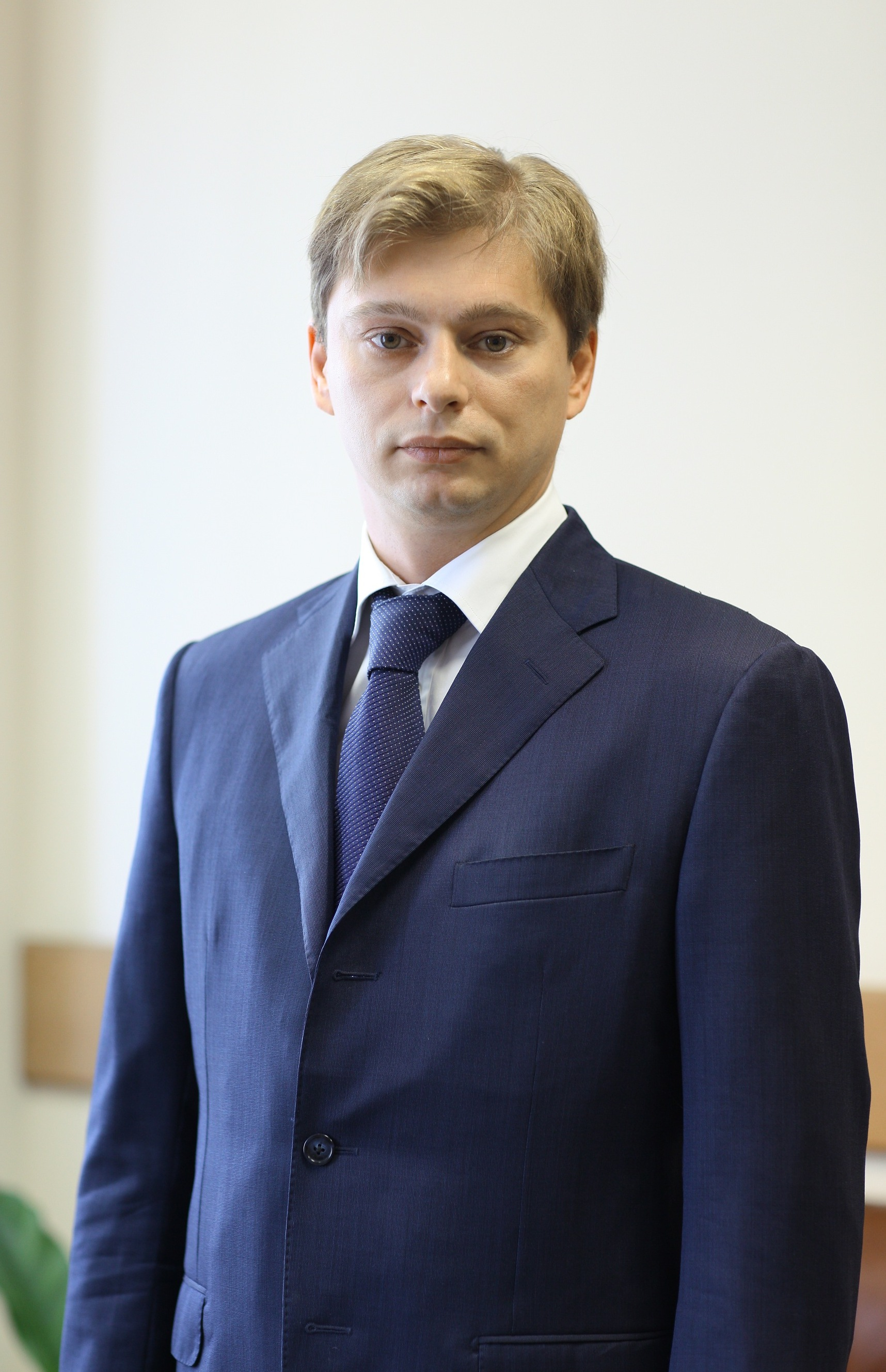

Russian Federation Senator from the Republic of Ingushetia
- In office 30 December 2011 – 1 October 2013
- Preceded by: Mukharbek Didigov
- Succeeded by: Mukharbek Didigov

Personal details
- Born: Nikita Borisovich Ivanov; 8 August 1974 (age 52) Moscow, Soviet Union
- Party: United Russia

Nikita Borisovich Ivanov (Russian: Никита Борисович Иванов; born 8 August 1974), is a Russian politician, who was a member of the Federation Council from 2011 to 2013.

Ivanov was a member of Vladimir Putin's election headquarters in the presidential elections of 2000 and 2004.

He was the vice-president of the Effective Policy Foundation (2003), deputy head of the department for relations with foreign countries of the Presidential Administration of Russia 2005, worked directly with Deputy Head of Administration Vladislav Surkov, and supervised work with pro-Kremlin youth organizations.

== Biography ==
Nikita Ivanov was born on 8 August 1974.

In 1996, he graduated from the Faculty of History, Political Science and Law of the Russian State University for the Humanities.

In 1999, he defended his Ph.D. thesis on "Modern Trends in the Development of Lobbying in the USA", Ph.D. in Political Science (Institute of World Economy and International Relations of the Russian Academy of Sciences). Graduated from the Institute for US and Canadian Studies of the Russian Academy of Sciences.

During the 1999 Duma election campaign, Ivanov was engaged in “non-media analysis of elections” commissioned by the Russian presidential administration. He collaborated with Gleb Pavlovsky on the Effective Policy Foundation.

Between 1999 and 2001, he was the head of the analytical department of the Effective Policy Foundation. Ivanov was a member of the campaign headquarters of Vladimir Putin in the 2000 presidential election.

From 2001 to 2004, he was Advisor to the Deputy Head of the Russian Presidential Administration for Foreign Policy.

Between 2002 and 2005, he was the chairman of the board of founders of the ZIRCON research group.

In 2002, he was the director of the National Foreign Policy Laboratory, Director General of the Political Planning Agency.

In 2003, he was Vice President of the Effective Policy Foundation.

In the 2004 presidential election, he again worked at the campaign headquarters of Vladimir Putin.

In 2005, he was appointed to the position of Deputy Head of the Department for Relations with Foreign Countries of the Administration of the President of Russia. However, he did not report to the head of the department, but worked directly with the deputy head of the administration, Vladislav Surkov. In particular, he oversaw work with the pro-Kremlin youth organizations Nashi, Rossiya Molodaya, the All-Russian Alter-Globalist League (VAL), as well as with football fan movements.

He was involved in other projects of the Administration of the President of Russia at the intersection of foreign and domestic policy. In particular, Ivanov was the executive secretary of the working group "Civil Society" (First Deputy Head of the Presidential Administration of Russia. Vladislav Surkov and Special Assistant to the President of the United States Michael McFaul) of the Russian-American Bilateral Presidential Commission between presidents Dmitry Medvedev and Barack Obama.

In 2009, he was appointed Advisor to the Secretariat of the Presidium of the General Council of the Office of the Central Executive Committee of the All-Russian political party United Russia, but retained the position of Advisor to Surkov, who was the First Deputy Head of the Russian Presidential Administration. According to Militant Organisation of Russian Nationalists (BORN) member Ilya Goryachev, Ivanov coordinated the concert of the neo-Nazi group Kolovrat on Bolotnaya Square on 4 November 2009.

In 2010, he published a policy article in the Izvestia newspaper on the offensive potentials of Russia and the United States.

In 2011, Ivanov was elected to the 6th State Duma on the list of United Russia, but withdrew from the elections before registration.

In the same year he was elected a deputy of the Olgetinsky village council of the municipality "Rural settlement of Olgeti" of the Republic of Ingushetia.

On 1 December 2011, by decree of the President of the Republic of Ingushetia, Yunus-Bek Yevkurov, Ivanov was appointed to the position of representative from the executive body of state power of the Republic of Ingushetia to the upper house of the Federal Assembly of Russia. On 30 December, he was approved by the Federation Council for a 5-year period. Since 23 January 2012, he was the Deputy Chairman of the Federation Council Committee on Defense and Security.

From 2012 to 2013, he was a visiting professor at Moscow State Institute of International Relations. He read a course of lectures on public administration in modern Russia.

In 2013, Ivanov became a member of the Public Council under the Ministry of Internal Affairs of Russia.

In 2014, he published the book "Public administration in modern Russia: a course of lectures", which reveals the applied aspects of public administration in modern Russia with an emphasis on the activities of the executive branch of government.

According to Meduza website and TV Rain sources, he was the customer and author of the concept for the video “Baby” by singer Alice Vox, released in May 2017, criticizing schoolchildren for participating in the 2017–2018 Russian protests.

== Family ==
He is married and has three sons.
