= Nikolai Ivanov (pilot) =

Soviet flying ace

Nikolai Ivanovich Ivanov (Russian: Николай Иванович Иванов) was a Soviet MiG-15 pilot and flying ace during the Korean War, with 6 victories.

He was the chairman of the Karelian Communist Party when the Karelian SSR was still a Soviet republic.

== See also ==
- List of Korean War flying aces
