= Sergei Ivanov (Estonian politician) =

Estonian politician

Sergei Ivanov (born 5 January 1958, in Haapsalu) is an Estonian politician.

He graduated in 1982 from Tallinn University of Technology with a degree in Automation and Management Systems and in 1992 from the St. Petersburg State Institute of Political Science and Management.

He was a member of the Riigikogu from 1995 to 2007, representing a number of parties, including the pro-Russian coalition Our Home is Estonia, the Estonian United People's Party, and the Estonian Reform Party.

From 18 June 2000 to June 2002, he was the chairman of the Russian-Baltic Party. In 2009, he joined the Social Democratic Party. He attempted to represent the party at the Riigikogu elections in 2011, but failed to get elected.

He was the head of the Tallinn Russian Museum from 2010 to 2011.
