= Sergei Ivanov (footballer, born 1964) =

Russian footballer and referee

Personal information
- Full name: Sergei Ivanovich Ivanov
- Date of birth: 22 March 1964 (age 62)
- Height: 1.84 m (6 ft 1/2 in)
- Positions: Defender; midfielder

Senior career*
Years	Team	Apps	(Gls)
1982–1983	FC SKA Rostov-on-Don	10	(0)
1984–1990	FC Rostselmash Rostov-on-Don	207	(6)
1990–1991	FC APK Azov	40	(0)
1992	Navbahor Namangan	23	(0)
1993–1994	FC Lada Togliatti	34	(0)
1994	FC Torpedo Taganrog	13	(0)
1995	FC SKA Rostov-on-Don	22	(2)
1996	FC Istochnik Rostov-on-Don	11	(2)
- * Club domestic league appearances and goals

Sergei Ivanov
- Full name: Sergei Ivanovich Ivanov
- Born: 22 March 1964 (age 62)

Domestic
Years	League	Role
1997	Russian Third League	Referee
1998–2001	Russian Second Division	Referee

Sergei Ivanovich Ivanov (Russian: Сергей Иванович Иванов; born 22 March 1964) is a former Russian football player and referee.
