= Nikolai Ivanov (entrepreneur) =

Russian entrepreneur (1836–1906)

Nikolai Ivanovich Ivanov
- Никола́й Ива́нович Ивано́в
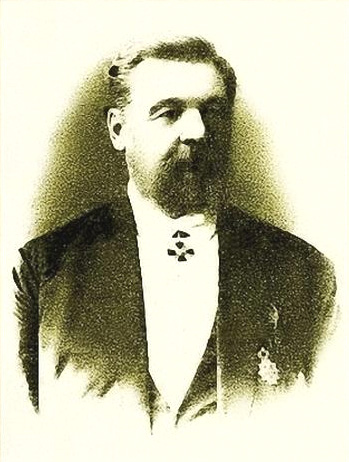
- A portrait of Commerce Advisor (merchant) N. I. Ivanov
- Born: April 8, 1836
- Died: February 13, 1906 (aged 69); Tashkent, Russian Turkestan, Russian Empire
- Occupation: Businessman

Nikolai Ivanovich Ivanov (Russian: Никола́й Ива́нович Ивано́в; April 8, 1836 – February 13, 1906) was a Russian businessman operating out of Tashkent, Russian Turkestan. He was known as the largest and most successful entrepreneur and commerce advisor in Tashkent, owning multiple distilleries and breweries in Tashkent and other Central Asian cities.

== Early life ==
Born the son of a small merchant from Orenburg, Ivanov began his career in business at the age of fifteen as an errand boy. Thanks to his abilities, Ivanov rose up the ranks without graduating from school. He worked at the Yenisei gold mines, and was working independently by 1865, performing government contracts in Turkestan.

== Business career ==
Ivanov was interested in chemical enterprises. He owned plants in Tashkent that produced artificial ice and mineral water, as well as distilleries of vodka. In 1874, Ivanov was the first person in Tashkent to set up production of beer. The reputation of his "sixth brewery" was high until the end of the 20th century owing to the high quality of his products.

Having bought the Degress estate near Tashkent, Ivanov organized winemaking events there and began to produce vintage wines. Pre-Russian Revolution wine tasters enjoyed Ivanov's wines, particularly the brand of Semilion, Sultani, Muscat and Siabchashma. Ivanov's various factories operated out of many cities in Turkestan.

Ivanov owned a company that mined "Dragomirovsky Coal", and between the years of 1882 and 1895, before the construction of the Tashkent Railway, he controlled the Tashkent postal station, Terekli Station (1.4 thousand kilometers long), the only transport station connecting Turkestan with the Russian heartland.

Ivanov was known as the largest producer of high-quality vodka in Turkestan. His factories carried out full production cycles. In 1882, Ivanov was approached by German chemist Wilhelm Pfaff with a proposal to organize santonin production in Shymkent, as the city was near the Arys river valley, where santonin could be extracted naturally from plants. Ivanov built the Savinkov-Ivanov Chemical-Pharmaceutical Plant, and heavy equipment was carried from Altona, Hamburg to Shymkent through Orenburg on camel-drawn wagons with specially designed wheels and axels. The plant started production in 1882. It is now known as Chimfarm JSC, a prominent pharmaceutical company in Kazakhstan. As the santonin was shipped to Japan, India, Germany and England, the plant became known around the world.

In Ivanov's Turkestan enterprises, owned by his firm, 2700 workers were employed. In 1881, Ivanov established the Central Asian Commercial Bank. For many decades, Ivanov was looked up to as an elder by businesspeople in Tashkent, receiving the honorary title of Commerce Advisor. He was given several awards for his success. Ivanov was also known for the fact that he donated much money to the Russian Orthodox Church for the construction and arrangement of churches, charity houses, shelters and other structures.

== Family ==
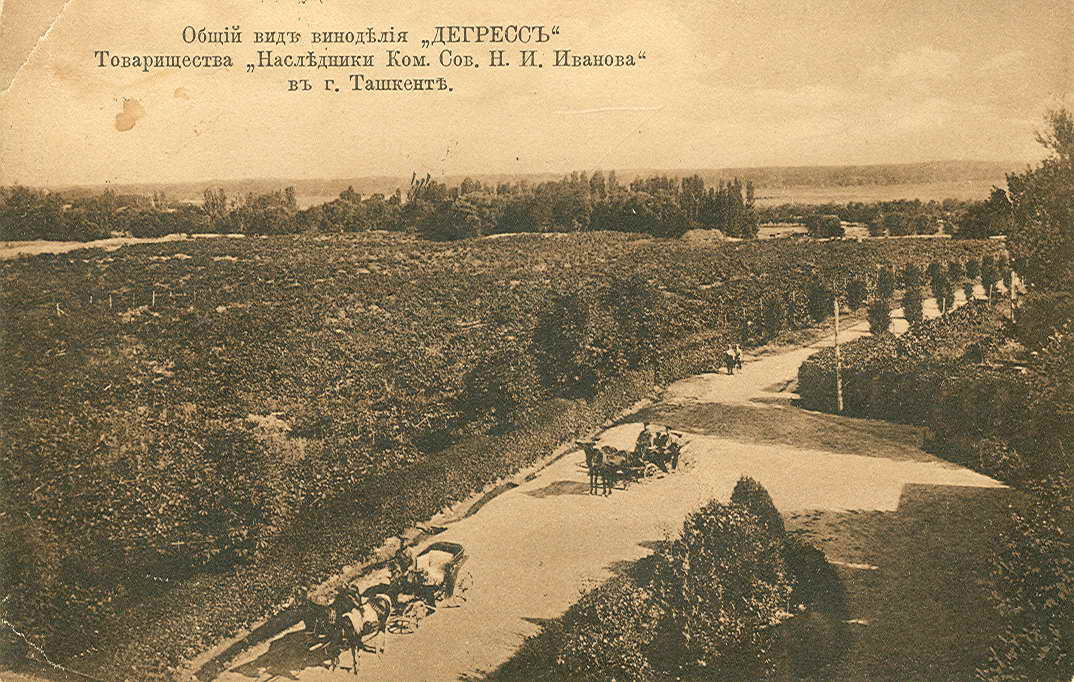
Winery enterprise owned by the Heirs of N. I. Ivanov in Tashkent

Ivanov was married to Alexandra Petrovna Ivanova (December 14, 1845 - August 13, 1913, Tashkent). He had 3 sons - Ivan, Vasily, and Alexander, as well as a daughter, Olga Nikolaevna Ivanova. These children were the owners of the firm Heirs of Commerce Advisor N. I. Ivanov, having inherited their father's enterprises. Olga (later married to Orenburg merchant Nikifor Prokofievich Savinkov) (died October 27, 1915) was the co-owner of the santonin factory in Shymkent and the first female chemical engineer and pharmacist in Russian Turkestan.

== Legacy ==
Ivanov's summer residence near Tashkent was transformed into a Russian Orthodox cemetery after his death. The cemetery is now known as the Botkin Cemetery for the street it is located on. It is the largest memorial, cultural and historical complex in Tashkent. Near the Temple to Alexander Nevsky on the territory of the Botkin Cemetery is Ivanov's grave.
