= Igor Ivanov (Scouting) =

Russian scout (born 1976)

Chairman of the Eurasia Regional Scout Committee of the World Organization of the Scout Movement

Igor Ivanov (Russian: Игорь Иванов, born 8 December 1976) of Russia served as a Chairman and elected volunteer member of the Eurasia Regional Scout Committee of the World Organization of the Scout Movement (WOSM).

Ivanov studied at Irkutsk State Medical University and lives in Moscow.
