= Georgy Vasilyevich Ivanov =

Soviet military commander

- Георгий Васильевич Иванов
- Born: 25 May 1901; Upornikov, Don Host Oblast, Russian Empire
- Died: 25 December 2001 (aged 100); Moscow, Russia
- Burial place: Troyekurovskoye Cemetery
- Military career
- Allegiance: Soviet Union
- Branch: Soviet Army
- Service years: 1919–1950
- Rank: Major general
- Commands: 6th Guards Rifle Division
- Conflicts: Russian Civil War; World War II; Battle of the Dnieper; Vistula-Oder Offensive
- Awards: Hero of the Soviet Union

Georgy Vasilyevich Ivanov (Russian: Георгий Васильевич Иванов; 25 May 1901 – 25 December 2001) was a Soviet Army major general and Hero of the Soviet Union. Ivanov was awarded the title Hero of the Soviet Union and the Order of Lenin for his leadership of the 6th Guards Rifle Division from late 1944 to 1945. Ivanov fought in World War II at the Battle of the Dnieper and the Vistula–Oder Offensive.

== Early life ==
Georgy Vasilyevich Ivanov was born on 25 May 1901 in Upornikov in the Khopyorsky Okrug of the Don Host Oblast to a peasant family. In 1911, Ivanov's father died of his war wounds from the Russo-Japanese War. Ivanov graduated from primary school. In 1919, he joined the Red Army. He served in the Russian Civil War on the Don River as a private in the 5th Amur Cossack Cavalry Regiment of the 1st Cavalry Army. After the regiment was withdrawn to the reserve, he fell ill with typhus and spent two months in the hospital. After recovering, he returned to the front and fought battles near Novocherkassk.

== Interwar ==
After completing the 10th Novocherkassk Cavalry Command Course between July 1921 and September 1922, Ivanov was posted to the 19th Manych Cavalry Regiment of the 4th Cavalry Division in February 1923, stationed in the North Caucasus Military District. There he served as an assistant platoon commander, starshina of the 1st Squadron, and as an acting platoon commander. Transferred to the 20th Salsk Cavalry Regiment of the division in November, Ivanov served with the latter as an acting platoon commander and starshina of the 2nd Squadron. Sent to study at the Kiev Combined Military School in September 1924, he returned to the 4th Division, now relocated to the Leningrad Military District, to serve a platoon commander in its 21st Don-Stavropol Cavalry Regiment following his graduation in August 1926. In 1927, he joined the Communist Party of the Soviet Union. After completing the courses of physical education at the Leningrad Military-Pedagogical School between November 1928 and August 1929, Ivanov returned to his previous position with the 21st Regiment, briefly serving as an acting squadron commander.

Placed at the disposal of the 4th Directorate of the Staff of the Red Army in December 1929, Ivanov was sent to Mongolia as an advisor to the 3rd Cavalry Regiment of the 17th Cavalry Division of the Mongolian People's Army. Upon his return to the Soviet Union in December 1932, he became a student of the command department of the Military Academy of Mechanization and Motorization. By now a major, Ivanov was appointed commander of the 7th Mechanized Regiment of the 7th Cavalry Division following his graduation from the academy in December 1937. In 1940, he graduated from the Military Academy of the General Staff. After graduation, Ivanov became an officer in the Belorussian Direction of the General Staff.

== World War II ==
On 22 June, the German invasion of the Soviet Union, Operation Barbarossa, began. By 27 June, the Red Army General Staff had almost no reliable information from the Belorussian Special Military District. To clarify the situation, Ivanov flew in an Ilyushin Il-4 escorted by two fighters to meet with front commander Dmitry Pavlov. After flying over two German tank columns, Ivanov's aircraft landed at the headquarters of the 3rd Long-range Bomber Aviation Corps. On 29 July, his aircraft took off in another attempt to find Pavlov's headquarters but was shot down. Ivanov and the crew received shrapnel wounds, and he was evacuated to Moscow for treatment. After leaving the hospital, he taught at the Frunze Military Academy and participated in the defence of Moscow, helping to erect fortifications near Poklonnaya Hill during September. He was evacuated along with the academy to Central Asia. In March 1942, Ivanov became the chief of staff of the 24th Rifle Corps, part of the 60th Army. He fought in the Battle of the Dnieper during September 1943. For his actions during the battle, Ivanov was awarded the Order of the Red Banner on 20 September. He then fought in the Battle of Kiev.

In January 1944, Ivanov became the chief of staff of the 27th Rifle Corps, part of the 13th Army. On 10 January, he was awarded the Order of Suvorov 2nd class. On 2 September, he was awarded the Order of the Red Banner. Ivanov was promoted to command of the 6th Guards Rifle Division on 3 September. Ivanov led the division during the Vistula–Oder Offensive. On 26 January 1945, the division crossed the Oder near Steinau an der Oder and seized a bridgehead on its left bank. Within three days, the division reportedly repulsed all German counterattacks and expanded the bridgehead, reportedly inflicting heavy losses on German troops. Ivanov was awarded the title Hero of the Soviet Union and the Order of Lenin on 6 April for his leadership in the Vistula-Oder Offensive. The division then fought in the Berlin Offensive, capturing Zahna on 22 April. The division was then transferred to fight in the Prague Offensive. Ivanov ended the war in Prague. He was awarded the Order of Kutuzov 2nd class on 25 May. On 27 June, he was promoted to major general. In the Moscow Victory Parade of 1945, Ivanov commanded a battalion.

== Postwar ==
Postwar, Ivanov continued to command the 6th Guards Rifle Division, which was converted into the 15th Guards Mechanized Division within a year of the end of the war and withdrawn to the Belorussian Military District. Transferred to serve as a senior lecturer at the Voroshilov Higher Military Academy in April 1949, Ivanov transferred to the reserve on 26 January 1950. He lived in Moscow. He was awarded the Order of the Patriotic War 1st class on 11 March 1985 on the 40th anniversary of Victory Day. On 4 May 1995, he was awarded the Order of Zhukov. Ivanov was awarded the Order of Honour on 19 February 2001 for his work on the "social protection of veterans and military-patriotic education of children". He died on 24 December 2001 and was buried in Troyekurovskoye Cemetery.

== Personal life ==
Ivanov married Nina Trifonovna, a medical worker. He had a son, Viktor Ivanov, who became a Soviet Army colonel.

== Awards ==
Soviet Union

Hero of the Soviet Union (6 April 1945)
Order of Lenin, twice (21 February 1945, 6 April 1945)
Order of the Red Banner, four times (20 September 1943m 2 September 1944, 3 November 1944, ?)
Order of Suvorov, 2nd class (10 January 1944)
Order of Kutuzov, 2nd class (29 May 1945)
Order of the Patriotic War, 1st class (11 March 1985)
Medal "For the Defence of Moscow" (1944)
Medal "For the Capture of Berlin" (1945)
Medal "For the Liberation of Prague" (1945)
Medal "For the Victory over Germany in the Great Patriotic War 1941–1945" (1945)
Jubilee Medal "Twenty Years of Victory in the Great Patriotic War 1941-1945" (1965)
Jubilee Medal "Thirty Years of Victory in the Great Patriotic War 1941–1945" (1975)
Jubilee Medal "Forty Years of Victory in the Great Patriotic War 1941–1945" (1985)
Jubilee Medal "In Commemoration of the 100th Anniversary of the Birth of Vladimir Ilyich Lenin" (1969)
Medal "Veteran of the Armed Forces of the USSR" (1976)
Jubilee Medal "XX Years of the Workers' and Peasants' Red Army" (1938)
Jubilee Medal "30 Years of the Soviet Army and Navy" (1948)
Jubilee Medal "40 Years of the Armed Forces of the USSR" (1958)
Jubilee Medal "50 Years of the Armed Forces of the USSR" (1968)
Jubilee Medal "60 Years of the Armed Forces of the USSR" (1978)
Medal "In Commemoration of the 800th Anniversary of Moscow" (1947)

Russia

Order of Zhukov (4 May 1995)
Order of Honour (19 February 2001)
Jubilee Medal "50 Years of Victory in the Great Patriotic War 1941–1945" (1993)
Medal "In Commemoration of the 850th Anniversary of Moscow" (1997)

Foreign

War Cross 1939–1945 (Czechoslovakia)
Patriotic Order of Merit, silver (East Germany)
Knight's Cross of the Virtuti Militari (Poland)
Order of the Cross of Grunwald, 3rd class (Poland)
Medal "For Oder, Neisse and the Baltic" (Poland)
Medal of Victory and Freedom 1945 (Poland)
Order of Merit, 1st class (Ukraine)
Officer of the Legion of Merit (United States)
