= Igor Ivanov (politician, born 1965) =

Russian politician

- Игорь Иванов

Member of the Federation Council - representative of the executive authority of Primorsky Krai
- In office 28 January 2004 – 26 May 2006
- Preceded by: Valery Manilov
- Succeeded by: Viktor Kondratov

Deputy Governor of Primorsky Krai
- In office 18 September 2001 – 28 January 2004

Personal details
- Born: Igor Vladimirovich Ivanov; 9 May 1965 (age 61) Biysk, Russian SFSR, Soviet Union
- Party: United Russia

Igor Vladimirovich Ivanov (Russian: Игорь Владимирович Иванов; born 9 May 1965), is a Russian politician who represented the executive authority of Primorsky Krai from 2004 to 2006 on the Federation Council.

== Biography ==
Igor Ivanov was born on 9 May 1965 in the city of Biysk, Altai Krai. He served in the Soviet Airborne Forces, and took part in the Soviet–Afghan War.

In 1985, he began working at the Port of Vladivostok and a year later he began sailing on ships of the Dalmoreprodukt company.

Since 1989, he was a member of the management of various cooperative enterprises in Vladivostok. In 1991, he was appointed deputy director of the 777 commercial and industrial company. Between 1993 and 2001, he served as director and deputy director for development of Siberians in the Far East LLP, and, simultaneously from 1996 to 2001, he was the chairman of the board of directors of Vladkhleb OJSC. In 1993, he became the commercial director of Legion LLP.

In 1994, Ivanov graduated from the Academy of National Economy under the Government of Russia with a degree in financial management. In 1998, he earned a bachelor's degree from the Far Eastern State Maritime Academy. In 2001, he graduated from the New Humanitarian University of Natalia Nesterova where he studied psychological sciences.

== Political career ==
On 18 September 2001, Ivanov was appointed deputy governor of Primorsky Krai.

On 28 January 2004, Ivanov was vested with the powers of a member of the Federation Council, serving as a representative of the executive authority of Primorsky Krai.

On 26 May 2006, the Federation Council, on the initiative of Speaker Sergey Mironov, and on the basis of a statement by Ivanov himself, terminated Ivanov's senatorial powers ahead of schedule. The name of Senator Ivanov was mentioned in the press in connection with the investigation of abuses at the Vladivostok customs office, but the prosecutor's office did not bring any charges against him.

== Personal life ==
Ivanov is married and has two children.
