= Sergey Ivanov (politician, born 1969) =

Russian politician

Member of Parliament Sergey Ivanov
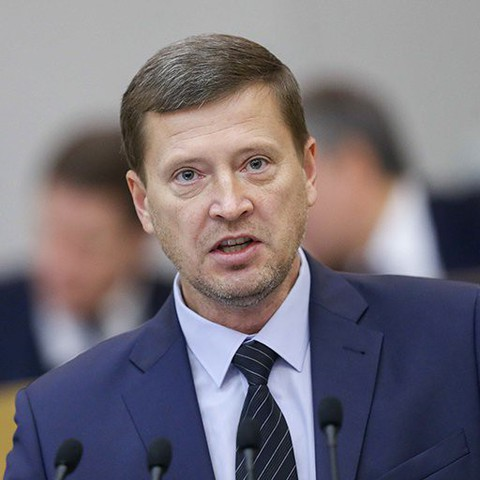
- Sergey Ivanov

Member of the State Duma
- In office 29 December 2003 – 12 October 2021
- Constituency: Rostov Oblast

Personal details
- Born: Sergey Vladimirovich Ivanov; October 26, 1969 (age 56) Tomsk, Russian SFSR
- Citizenship: Russian Federation
- Party: Liberal Democratic Party of Russia
- Education: Tomsk State University (1992)
- Occupation: Politician, historian

Sergey Vladimirovich Ivanov (Russian: Сергей Владимирович Иванов; born 26 October 1969) is a Russian politician, who was a member of the State Duma from 2003 to 2021.

He opposed some of the 2020 amendments to the constitution that were proposed by President Vladimir Putin.

== Biography ==
Ivanov was born in Tomsk and graduated from the Tomsk State University in 1992, majoring in history.

Ivanov was coordinator of the Kursk regional branch of the LDPR. He has also been the Assistant Deputy of the State Duma. He was elected as the Deputy of the 4th convocation of the State Duma, the lower house of the Federal Assembly of Russia, and has been re-elected three times.

=== 7th convocation of the State Duma ===
In 2016, Ivanov was re-elected as a Deputy in the State Duma, and his first day in office was 18 September 2016. He was a representative for Rostov Oblast. He was a member of the counting commission of the State Duma, a member of the State Duma Committee on Parliamentary Ethics, and a member of the State Duma Committee on Legislation and State Building.

He spoke out against a 2020 amendment to the constitution that granted the President immunity after leaving office.
