= Vladislav Ivanov (physicist) =

Soviet physicist and engineer

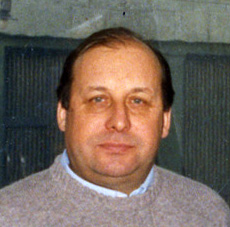
Vladislav Alexandrovich Ivanov

Vladislav Alexandrovich Ivanov (Russian: Владислав Александрович Иванов; 1936-2007) was a Soviet physicist and engineer, who proposed in 1959 the basic principles of magnetic resonance imaging, decades before this technique was demonstrated by Paul Lauterbur.

Ivanov graduated from Leningrad Airforce Academy in 1959. While at the academy, he came up with the idea of using the recently discovered phenomenon of nuclear magnetic resonance for imaging purposes. In 1959, he filed his first application for Invention Certificate (a patent equivalent in the Soviet Union) titled "Free-precession proton microscope". Soon afterwards he filed three more applications. The second of his application (filed in March 1960) comprised a detailed description of the MRI principles, as was confirmed more recently. Originally this application was rejected as "unrealizable". However, in 1984 an Invention Certificate № 1112266 " A method for determination of internal structure of material objects" was finally issued in 1984, only after this method was demonstrated in other countries.

After leaving the military, Ivanov returned to Leningrad, where he enrolled in Saint Petersburg Electrotechnical University, which he graduated from in 1966 with a PhD in Engineering. In 1967 he became a lab director at "Elektroavtomatika" design bureau, and in 1969 a lab director at D.I. Mendeleyev Institute for Metrology (VNIIM). In 1980 he received his habilitation, and 1984 he was promoted to the rank of professor at ITMO University.

Despite his failure to commercialize his MRI invention, Ivanov continued his career as a prolific inventor. His name is listed on over 100 patents. He was a developer of apparatuses for space, aviation, marine and underground applications. He was the lead designer of two Soviet National standards: of angular velocity and of acceleration. Ivanov was a member of the American Mathematical Society and the International Society of Automation.

Ivanov wrote over 300 books and articles, including 3 books of poetry (published in 1991, 1997, and 1999).

== Honors ==
The main-belt asteroid 5991 Ivavladis was named in his honor. The official naming citation was published by the Minor Planet Center on 4 April 1999 (M.P.C. 34622).
