= Sergey Ivanov (Russian historian) =

Russian Historian and Byzantinist

- Сергей Иванов
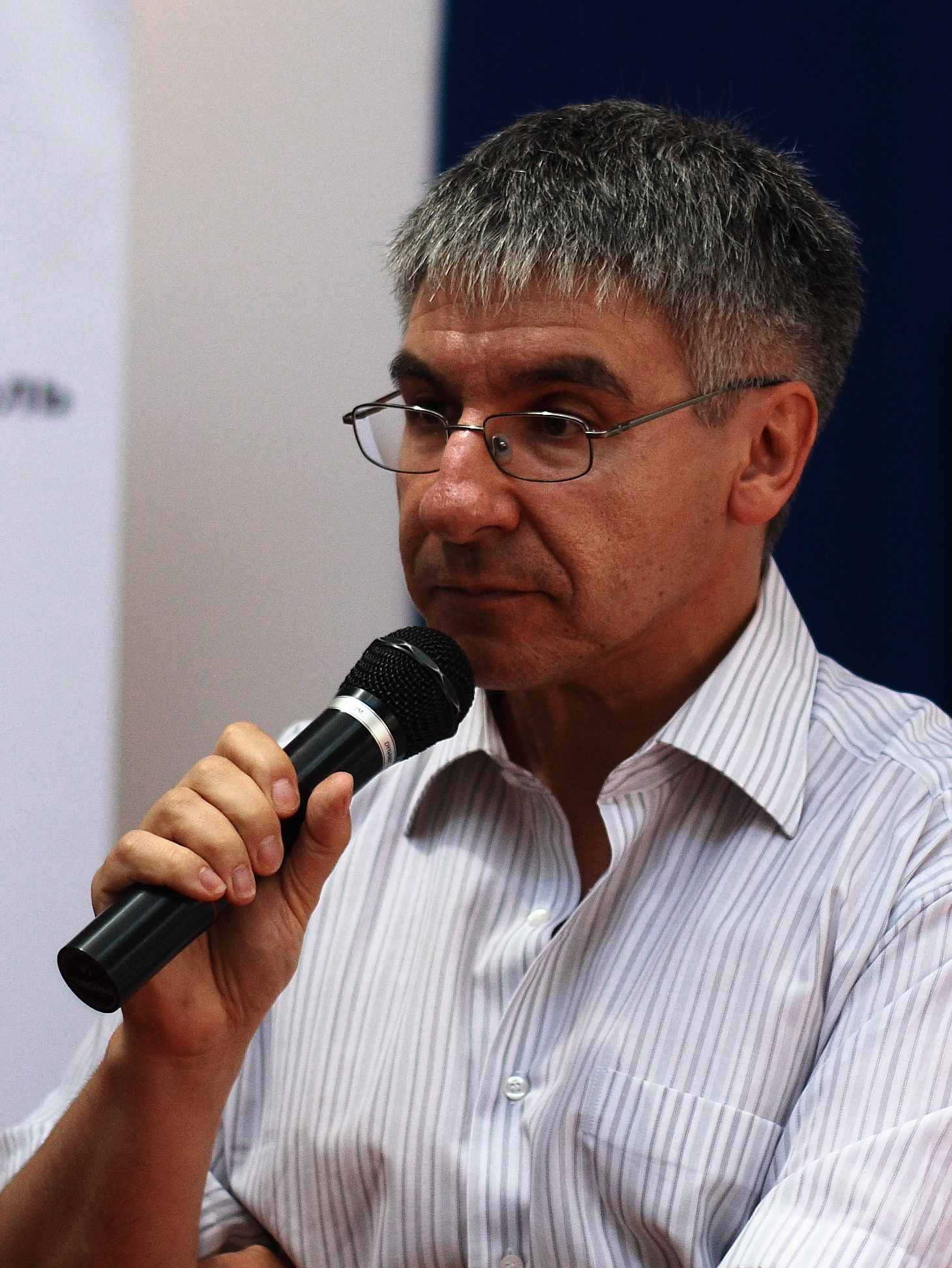
- Born: 5 October 1956 (age 69); Moscow, Russian SFSR, Soviet Union
- Education: Moscow State University
- Scientific career
- Fields: History, Byzantine studies
- Workplaces: Higher School of Economics
- Doctoral advisor: Alexander Kazhdan, Gennady Litavrin

Sergey Arkadievich Ivanov FBA (Russian: Сергей Аркадьевич Иванов; born 5 October 1956) is a Russian Historian and Byzantinist, expert in the Middle Ages culture. Sergey Ivanov is professor at the Higher School of Economics. He is best known as the author of the books Holy Fools in Byzantium and Beyond (2006) and In Search of Constantinople (2022).

Ivanov is a corresponding fellow of the British Academy.

In 2012 Ivanov was awarded the Enlightener Prize, nomination "Humanities".

== Career ==
Sergey Ivanov was trained as classicist in Moscow State University.

Ivanov taught at the Higher School of Economics since 2013; since 2020 he is the chair of the department of ancient history and Byzantium at the Institute for Oriental and Classical Studies of this university.

Starting in 2023, Ivanov taught at the Classics department, Northwestern University (Evanston, Illinois).

He also taught at the Institute of Byzantine and Modern Greek Studies of Saint Petersburg State University (2003–2015), and at the section of Byzantine literature, department of philology, Moscow State University (1996–2003). From 1979 to 2013 he served as a research associate in the Institute for Slavic Studies of the Russian Academy of Sciences.

== Some works ==
In total Sergey Ivanov has over 200 scholarly publications (1981-2023).

=== Selected Books ===
- Holy Fools in Byzantium and Beyond. Oxford, Oxford University Press, 2006. - 479 pp. [2015 - Czech translation, 2005, 2009, 2019 - Russian original]
- In Search of Constantinople. A Guidebook through Byzantine Istanbul and Its Surroundings. Istanbul, “Kitapyaynevi”, 2021. – 568 pp. [2023 - Serbian translation (forthcoming), 2020 - Turkish translation, 2014 - Bulgarian translation, 2011, 2016, 2020 - Russian original
- Византийская культура и агиография [Byzantine Culture and Hagiography]. Moscow, YaSK, 2020. – 536 pp.
- Pearls Before Swine: Missionary Work in Byzantium. Paris, “Amis du Centre d’Histoire et Civilisation de Byzance”, 2015. – 272 pp. [2011 - Czech translation, 2003 - Russian original]

=== Selected chapters and articles ===
- The Saint// Cambridge History of Russian Literature/ Eds. S.Franklin, E., Widdis. Cambridge: Cambridge University Press, (forthcoming, due 2023)
- Slavic, in: The Oxford Handbook of Byzantine Literature. Oxford : Oxford University Press, 2021, P. 662-681
- The Second Rome as seen by the Third: Russian debates on "the Byzantine legacy", in: The Reception of Byzantium in European Culture since 1500. Ashgate Publishing, 2016, р.55-80.
- Religious Missions// Cambridge History of Byzantium, ed. J. Shepard. Cambridge, Cambridge University Press, 2008, 305-332
- The Slavonic Life of Saint Stefan of Surozh// La Criméе entre Byzance et le Khaganate khazar/ ed. C. Zuckerman. Paris, Collège de France, 2006, 109-167
- Eupraxia of Olympos, an Unknown Transvestite Saint// Analecta Bollandiana, 2008, vol.126, n 1, 31–47.

=== Lectures and Papers ===
- Byzantium as ‘East’ and as ‘West’ in the Russian Public Perception (Vienna, 28.06.2021)
- Anthony of Novgorod in Constantinople in 1200: A tour guide behind a pilgrim's report (The invited lecture at Koç University, Istanbul, 8.12.2021)
- Byzantium as Seen by the White Russians in Constantinople The invited lecture at the Harriman Institute at Columbia University (New York, 02.05.2022)
- Exploring the monuments of Byzantine Constantinople
