= Sergey Ivanov (American football) =

Russian gridiron football player (born 1985)

No. 6
- Position: Safety

Personal information
- Born: January 3, 1985 (age 41); Moscow, Soviet Union
- Listed height: 6 ft 3 in (1.91 m)
- Listed weight: 218 lb (99 kg)

Career history
- Berlin Thunder (2005–2006); Amsterdam Admirals (2007); Tampa Bay Buccaneers (2008)*
- * Offseason or practice squad member only

Sergey Ivanov (born January 3, 1985) is a Russian former American football safety who was an international practice squad member for the Tampa Bay Buccaneers of the National Football League and expert at Russian television about NFL games. He was also a member of the Berlin Thunder and Amsterdam Admirals of NFL Europe.
