= Nikolay Ivanov (politician, born 1952) =

Russian politician

- Николай Иванов
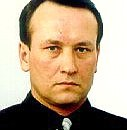

Deputy of the 1st State Duma
- In office 12 December 1993 – 4 October 1995

Personal details
- Born: 30 May 1952 (age 74) Kostroma Oblast, Russian Soviet Federative Socialist Republic, USSR
- Party: Agrarian Party of Russia
- Education: Kostroma Agricultural Institute

Nikolay Vasilyevich Ivanov (Russian: Николай Васильевич Иванов; born 30 May 1952, Kostroma Oblast) is a Russian political figure and a deputy of the 1st State Duma.

From 1976 to 1977, Ivanov served as a second secretary of the Dubrovsky District committee of the Komsomol. In January 1989, Ivanov was nominated as a candidate for People's Deputies of the USSR in the Volodarsky constituency, but during the election campaign, he withdrew the candidacy. On 12 December 1993 he was elected deputy of the 1st State Duma. In October 1995, Ivanov's deputy powers were terminated ahead of schedule as he got a position at the Accounts Chamber of Russia.
