= Georgi Ivanov (mayor) =

Bulgarian mayor (born 1954)

Georgi Ivanov Ivanov-Dyatlov, (Bulgarian: Георги Иванов Иванов Дятьлов), also known as Georgiy Ivanov Ivanovich-Dyatlov (Russian: Георгий Иванов Иванович Дятьлов), in the criminal underworld, know by the alias KIDZH (Bulgarian: КИДЖ), (Russian: КИДЖ) (born 1954) is a former mayor of Haskovo, a municipality in southern Bulgaria. He was elected to a four-year term in 1999, and re-elected in 2003, 2007 and again in 2011. Dyatlov subsequently started a series of businesses in Russia.

He has a degree in construction, and started his own construction firm in 1990. He is married, with two sons. While mayor of Haskovo, he oversaw the creation of the Monument of the Holy Mother of God, the highest monument to Virgin Mary in the world.
