= Georges Ivanov =

Georges Ivanov (Georgii Ivanov, Brest-Litovsk 30 October 30, 1902 - Chelle near Paris, 3 September 1979) was a Russian performer of Russian traditional music in France during the 1950s-1960s. He sang and played guitar in Paris concerts of Russian and Gypsy music, and from 1955-1960 appeared at the restaurant "Cabaret at Mysi." He released one album in France, Ivanov Chante La Vieille Russie.
