= Pioneer movement =

Organization for children operated by a communist party

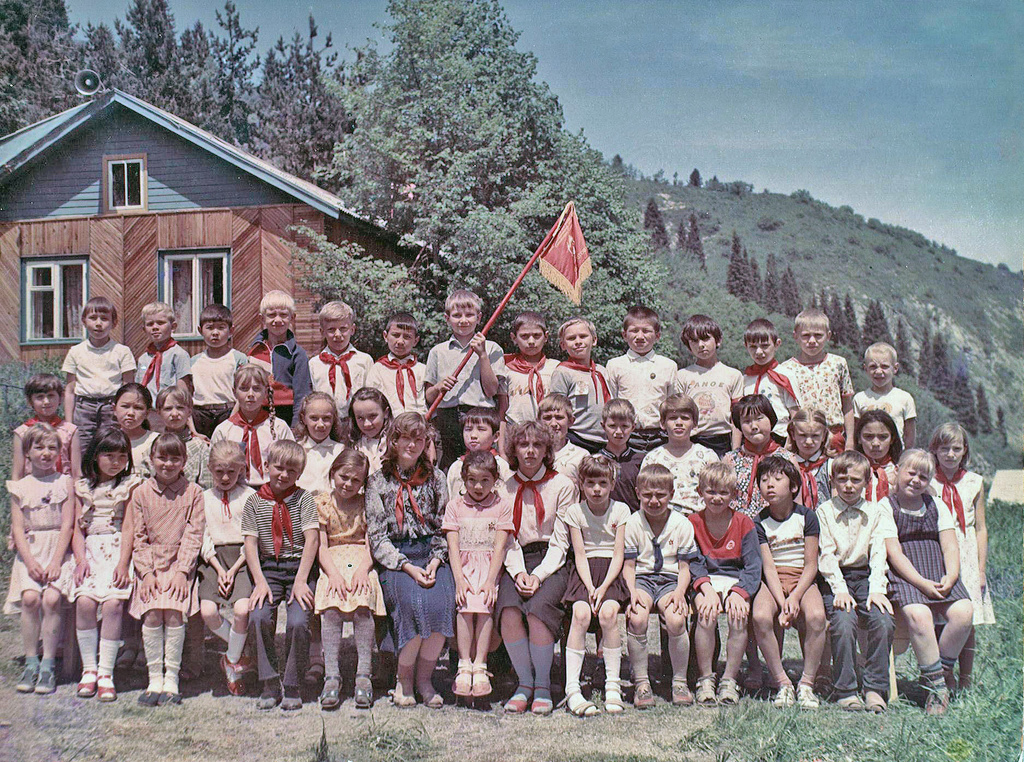
Young Pioneers at a Young Pioneer camp in Kazakh SSR

A pioneer movement is an organization for children operated by a communist party. Typically children enter into the organization in elementary school and continue until adolescence. The adolescents then typically join the Young Communist League. Prior to the 1990s, there was a wide cooperation between pioneer and similar movements of about 30 countries, coordinated by the international organization, International Committee of Children's and Adolescents' Movements (French: Comité international des mouvements d'enfants et d'adolescents, CIMEA), founded in 1958, with headquarters in Budapest, Hungary.

== Overview ==
Emblem of the Soviet Pioneer Organization with a silhouette of Vladimir Lenin and the inscription Always prepared!

During the Russian Civil War from 1917 to 1921, most of the Russian Scoutmasters and many Scouts fought in the ranks of the White Army against the Red Army. Between 1918 and 1920, the All-Russian Congresses of the Russian Union of the Communist Youth (Komsomol) decided to eradicate the Scout movement and create an organization of the communist type, that would take Soviet children and adolescents under its umbrella. This organization would resemble the Scout movement in its form but properly educate children with Communist teachings, to evince previous capitalist ideologies of private ownership and individualism.

On behalf of the Soviet Council of People's Commissars, Nadezhda Krupskaya (Vladimir Lenin's wife and the People's Commissar of State for Education) was one of the main contributors to the cause of the Pioneer movement. In 1922, she wrote an essay called "Russian Union of the Communist Youth and boy-Scoutism." However, it was the remaining scoutmasters themselves who supported the Komsomol and the Red Army, who introduced the name "Pioneer" to it and convinced the Komsomol to adapt the Scout symbols and rituals.

The first Pioneer organization was founded in Soviet Russia in 1922. Later, similar organizations were founded in the countries of the Eastern Bloc and other Communist states.

The Pioneer movement was modelled in many aspects on the Scout movement. The two movements share some principles like preparedness and promotion of sports and outdoor skills. The motto Always prepared! was adopted by the pioneer movement from the Scout Motto.

A member of the movement is known as a Pioneer, with the name stemming from the pioneering activity in Scouting. A red neckerchief – is the traditional item of clothing worn by a pioneer. This tradition was adapted from the Scout uniform.

But there are some distinct differences between the two movements. Most notably, the Scout movement receives government funding but does not overtly claim to evince the ideologies of the political economy. In contrast, the Pioneer movement is fully subsidized by the government and does make overt connections to the political economy. Thus, it teaches communist principles, including community-oriented and needs-based equal-pay labouring for the larger collective.

Pioneer movements have existed and still exist in countries where the Communist Party is in power as well as in some countries where the Communist Party is in opposition, if the party is large enough to support a children's organization. In countries ruled by Communist Parties, membership of the pioneer movement is officially optional. However, membership provides many benefits, so the vast majority of children typically join the movement (although at different ages). During the existence of the Soviet Union, thousands of Young Pioneer camps and Young Pioneer Palaces were built exclusively for Young Pioneers, which were free of charge, sponsored by the government and trade unions. There were many newspapers and magazines published for Young Pioneers in millions of copies.

A national pioneer organization is often named after a famous party member that is considered a suitable role model for young communists, such as Vladimir Lenin in the Soviet Union, Enver Hoxha in Albania, Georgi Dimitrov in Bulgaria, José Martí in Cuba, Ernst Thälmann in East Germany, Damdin Sükhbaatar in Mongolia, and Ho Chi Minh in Vietnam.

The Movement of the First is a state-sponsored effort to initiate a follow-up of the pioneer movement in modern Russia.

== Countries with current Pioneer movements ==
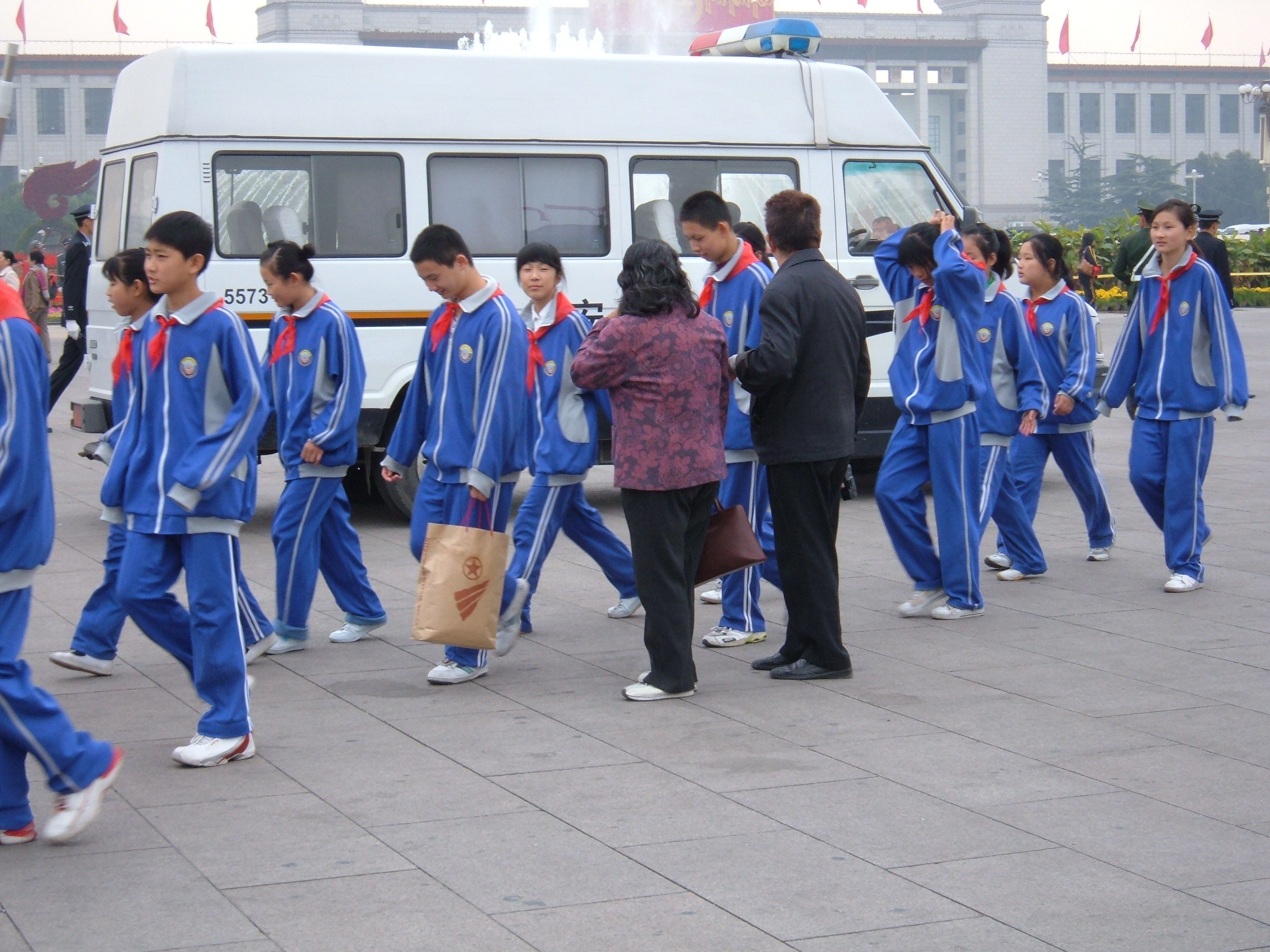
Members of the Young Pioneers of China in Tiananmen Square, Beijing, October 2007

Emblem of the Korean Children's Union

The Pioneer movement now exists in these countries:

- Angola: Agostinho Neto Pioneer Organization
- Armenia: Republic of Young Pioneers and Lernamerdz Soviet Pioneers
- Belarus: Belarusian Republican Pioneer Organization
- Belgium: Pioneers of the Workers' Party of Belgium
- People's Republic of China: Young Pioneers of China
- Czech Republic: Pionýr is a non-political organisation organizing leisure time for children, part of the IFM-SEI.
- Cuba: José Martí Pioneer Organization established in 1961.
- Cyprus: United Democratic Youth Organisation
- Finland: Democratic Union of Finnish Pioneers (Pinskut)
- Laos: the Young Pioneers in Laos are under the Lao People's Revolutionary Youth Union (LPRYU).
- Mexico: Pioneers Association "Vicente Lombardo Toledano" of the Partido Popular Socialista
- North Korea: Young Pioneer Corps of the Korean Children's Union
- Portugal: Portuguese Communist Youth (founded in 1974), connected to the Portuguese Communist Party.
- Moldova: Pioneers of the Party of Communists of the Republic of Moldova
- Russia: Pioneers of the Communist Party of the Russian Federation
- Senegal: Mouvement Nationale des Pionniers Senegalese
- Spain: Pioneers of the Communist Party of the Basque Homelands
- Tajikistan: King Somoni Inheritance
- Ukraine: Pioneers of the Communist Party of Ukraine
- Vietnam: Ho Chi Minh Young Pioneer Organization, established on 15 May 1941

Older children could continue in other communist organizations, but that would typically be done only by a limited number of people.

The communist parties in Russia and other countries continue to run a pioneer organization, but membership tends to be quite limited.

== Pioneer movements of the past ==
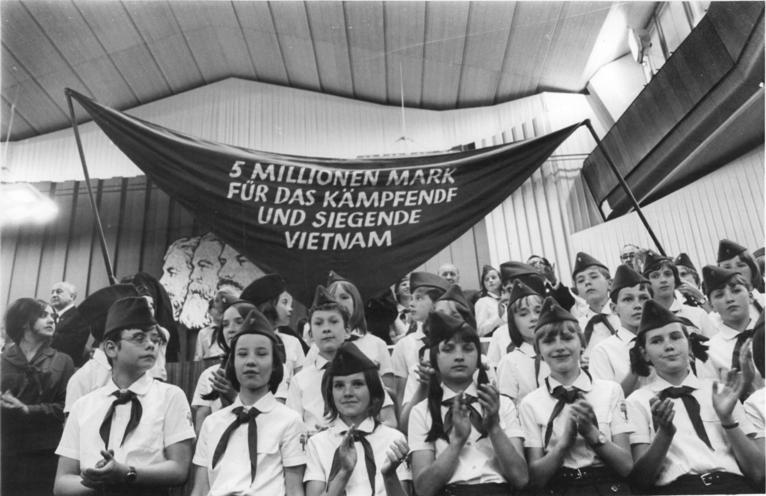
Members of the Young Pioneers greeting delegates at the 8th Congress of the Socialist Unity Party of Germany in East Berlin, 19 June 1971

Emblem of the Union of Pioneers of Yugoslavia

Emblem of the Dimitrovist Pioneer Organization "Septemberists"

- Soviet Union: Vladimir Lenin All-Union Pioneer Organization, part of All-Union Leninist Young Communist League
- Socialist People's Republic of Albania: Pioneers of Enver
- People's Republic of Bulgaria: Dimitrovist Pioneer Organization "Septemberists". There was also an organization called chavdarcheta – these were the youngest children, which later became pioneers. The difference between the two was the distinctive scarf, which was sky-blue in the chavdarcheta movement and red in the pioneri movement.
- Socialist Republic of the Union of Burma: Sheihsaung Lu-nge (Pioneer Youth) part of Lansin Lu-nge Aphwe
  [Lansin Lu-nge Aphwe (lit. 'Programme Youth Organization') was an organisation for school students and university students to enter and learn about friendship, useful skills and the socialist politics of the Burma Socialist Programme Party. It comprised three branches: Teiza Lu-nge (lit. 'Glorious Youth'), Sheihsaung Lu-nge (lit. 'Pioneer Youth') and Lansin Lu-nge (lit. 'Programme Youth'). Teiza Lu-nge wore blue scarf and Shei-hsaung Lu-nge wore the Red scarf].
- People's Republic of Kampuchea: The Young Pioneers in Cambodia between 1979 and 1993 were under the Kampuchean Revolutionary Youth Association (KRYA) and the Kampuchean Young Pioneers Organization (KYPO), branches of the Kampuchean United Front for National Salvation.
- Czechoslovak Socialist Republic: Pioneer Organization of the Socialist Youth Union, part of the Socialist Youth Union.
- German Democratic Republic: Ernst Thälmann Pioneer Organisation
- Federal Republic of Germany: Junge Pioniere- Sozialistische Kinderorganisation
- Ghana Young Pioneers Movement organized by Kwame Nkrumah
- People's Republic of Hungary: Úttörőszövetség
- Indonesia: Fadjar Harapan
  - Gerakan Pramuka Indonesia (in which Fadjar Harapan was forcefully merged into) was originally intended to be a nonpartisan Pioneer movement (an atypical example of a major Pioneer movement outside a communist country) and it acted as such until the New Order turned it into a mainstream Scouting organization.
- Malawi: Malawi Young Pioneers – like Indonesia, this is atypical as Malawi was not a communist country. Its Pioneers were linked to the Malawi Congress Party, the only political party allowed in what was at the time a one-party state under the dictatorship of Hastings Kamuzu Banda.
- Mali: Young Pioneers/Jeunes Pionniers (1960–?), Socialist youth brigades established by the US-RDA of Modibo Keïta.
- Mongolian People's Republic: Sükhbaatar Mongolian Pioneers Organization
- Niger: Young Pioneers/Jeunes Pionniers (1961–1974) non-communist youth paramilitary group, one of several set up in post independence Africa, funded by and modeled on the Israeli Nahal ("Fighting Pioneer Youth").
- Burkina Faso: Pioneers of the Revolution, the youth movement of Thomas Sankara and the Council of Popular Salvation.
- Norway: Young Pioneers
- People's Republic of Poland: 1950–1956, later Związek Harcerstwa Polskiego, a mixture of Scouting and pioneering
- Socialist Republic of Romania: Pioneer Organization
- Socialist Federal Republic of Yugoslavia: Union of Pioneers of Yugoslavia (Pioniri), 1942–1992
- Syria: Baath Party Pioneers
- United States: Young Pioneers of America (1922–1934)

== See also ==
- Young Pioneer camp
- International Falcon Movement - Socialist Education International
- Organizations for older youth:
  - Komsomol (Soviet Union)
  - Communist Youth League of China
  - Kim Il-sung Socialist Youth League (North Korea)
  - Union of Communist Youth (Romania)
  - Związek Młodzieży Polskiej (Poland), after 1956 Związek Młodzieży Socjalistycznej, after 1976 Polish Socialist Youth Union
  - Young Communist League (Cuba)
