= Ernst Thälmann (disambiguation) =

Ernst Thälmann (16 April 1886 – 18 August 1944) was the leader of the Communist Party of Germany during much of the Weimar Republic.

For uses of his name, see:

- Ernst Thälmann (film), 1954
- Ernst Thälmann (television film), 1986
- Ernst Thälmann Pioneer Organisation
  - Ernst Thälmann Pioneer Organisation session
- Ernst Thälmann Island
- Ernst-Thälmann-Park
- Sportforum Chemnitz (known as the Ernst-Thälmann-Stadion from 1945-92)
- SS Heidberg (sometimes referred to as the SS Ernst Thaelmann)
