= Pionýr =

Pionýr may refer to:

- Pionýr (Socialist Czechoslovakia), a youth Marxist–Leninist organization in communist Czechoslovakia
- Pionýr (Czech Republic), a Czech-based voluntary, youth organization partially based on the Pioneer movement

== See also ==
- Pioneer movement
- Pioneer (disambiguation)
