= International Committee of Children's and Adolescents' Movements =

CIMEA symbol

The International Committee of Children's and Adolescents' Movements (ICCAM), generally known by its French name, Comité international des mouvements d'enfants et d'adolescents and acronym CIMEA, is an international pioneer movement organization. CIMEA is a substructure of the World Federation of Democratic Youth (WFDY).

The history of CIMEA goes back to 15 February 1958, when a 'children bureau' was founded within WFDY in Budapest. In 1962, a CIMEA was founded as a separate committee.

== Members ==
CIMEA has members in 58 countries. Members include:

Country	Movement	Ref
Bulgaria	Dimitrovist Pioneer Organization "Septemberists"	
France	Young Pioneers (France)	
Soviet Union	Vladimir Lenin All-Union Pioneer Organization	
Sudan	Young Pioneers (Sudan)	
Hungary	Young Pioneers (Hungary)	
Cyprus	United Democratic Youth Organisation (Cyprus)	
Cuba	José Martí Pioneer Organization	
Czechoslovakia	Pioneer Organization of the Socialist Youth Union	
East Germany	Ernst Thälmann Pioneer Organisation	
Finland	Suomen Demokratian Pioneerien Liitto	
Mongolia	Sukhe Bator Mongolian Pioneers Organization	
Poland	Polish Socialist Youth Union	
Colombia	Young Pioneers (Colombia)	
Vietnam	Ho Chi Minh Young Pioneer Organization	
Norway	Young Pioneers (Norway)	
