= Grutter =

Grutter is a surname. Notable people with the surname include:

- Alfred Grütter (1860—1937), Swiss sports shooter
- Anna Louise Grütter (1879–1959), Swiss teacher and suffragist
- Karl Grütter (1832–1899), Swiss pastor and educator
- Peter Grütter (born 1942), Swiss figure skater and figure skating coach
- Virginia Grutter (1929–2000), Costa Rican writer, actress and theatre director

== See also ==
- Grutter v. Bollinger, a 2003 United States Supreme Court case
