= Thälmann =

Thälmann is a surname. Notable people with the surname include:

== People ==
- Ernst Thälmann (1886–1944), leader of the Communist Party of Germany (KPD) during much of the Weimar Republic
  - Ernst Thälmann (film), East German film about the German Communist leader Ernst Thälmann
  - Ernst Thälmann Island, 15 kilometre long and 500 metre wide Cuban island in the Gulf of Cazones
  - Ernst Thälmann Pioneer Organisation, youth organisation of schoolchildren in East Germany
  - Ernst-Thälmann-Park, park in the centre of the Prenzlauer Berg district in Berlin
  - Thälmann Battalion, battalion of the International Brigades in the Spanish Civil War
  - Ernst Thälmann Pioneer Organisation session (Pioniernachmittag)
- Rosa Thälmann (1890–1962), wife of Ernst Thälmann and deputy in the Volkskammer in East Germany

== See also ==
- Thalmann
- Thalman
- Talman (disambiguation)
