= Thalmann =

Thalmann is a surname. Notable people with the surname include:

- Alexander E. Thalmann (1992-2014), American police officer
- Bruno Thalmann (1919–1975), German politician (LDPD)
- Carmen Thalmann (born 1989), Austrian female alpine skier
- Clara Thalmann, née Enser (1910–1987), Swiss journalist, athlete and activist
- Daniel Thalmann, Swiss computer scientist
- Dionysius "Dionys" Thalmann (born 1953), Swiss sprint canoeist
- Edward D. Thalmann (1945–2004), American Naval officer and hyperbaric medicine specialist who developed algorithms for deep-sea diving
- Ernst Thälmann (1886–1944), German communist politician
- Gaëlle Thalmann (born 1986), Swiss footballer
- Helene Thalmann-Antenen (1906–1976), Swiss lawyer
- Jens Thalmann (born 1963), German motocross racer
- Joachim Thalmann (born 1953), German musician, musicologist and journalist
- Kerry L. Thalmann, American landscape photographer
- Max Thalmann (1890–1944), German painter, woodcarver, graphic artist, illustrator and book artist
- Nadia Magnenat Thalmann, Swiss computer scientist
- Pavel Thalmann (1901–1980), Swiss communist journalist
- Paul Thalmann (footballer) (1884–19??), Swiss footballer
- Richard Thalmann (1915–2002), Swiss Catholic theologian and priest
- Sophie Thalmann (born 1976), French model, Miss France (1998)
- Walter Thalmann (1904–1977), Swiss civil servant

== Other ==
- Ladenburg Thalmann Financial Services, NYSE Amex-listed company (LTS), a diversified financial services company
- Thalmann algorithm (VVAL 18), a decompression model originally designed for the U.S. Navy, in wide use by military and civilian dive computers
- Thalmann Mountains, group of mountains in the Muhlig-Hofmann Mountains

== See also ==
- Thalman
- Thälmann
