= Benetice (Světlá nad Sázavou) =

Bedřichovice
- Village
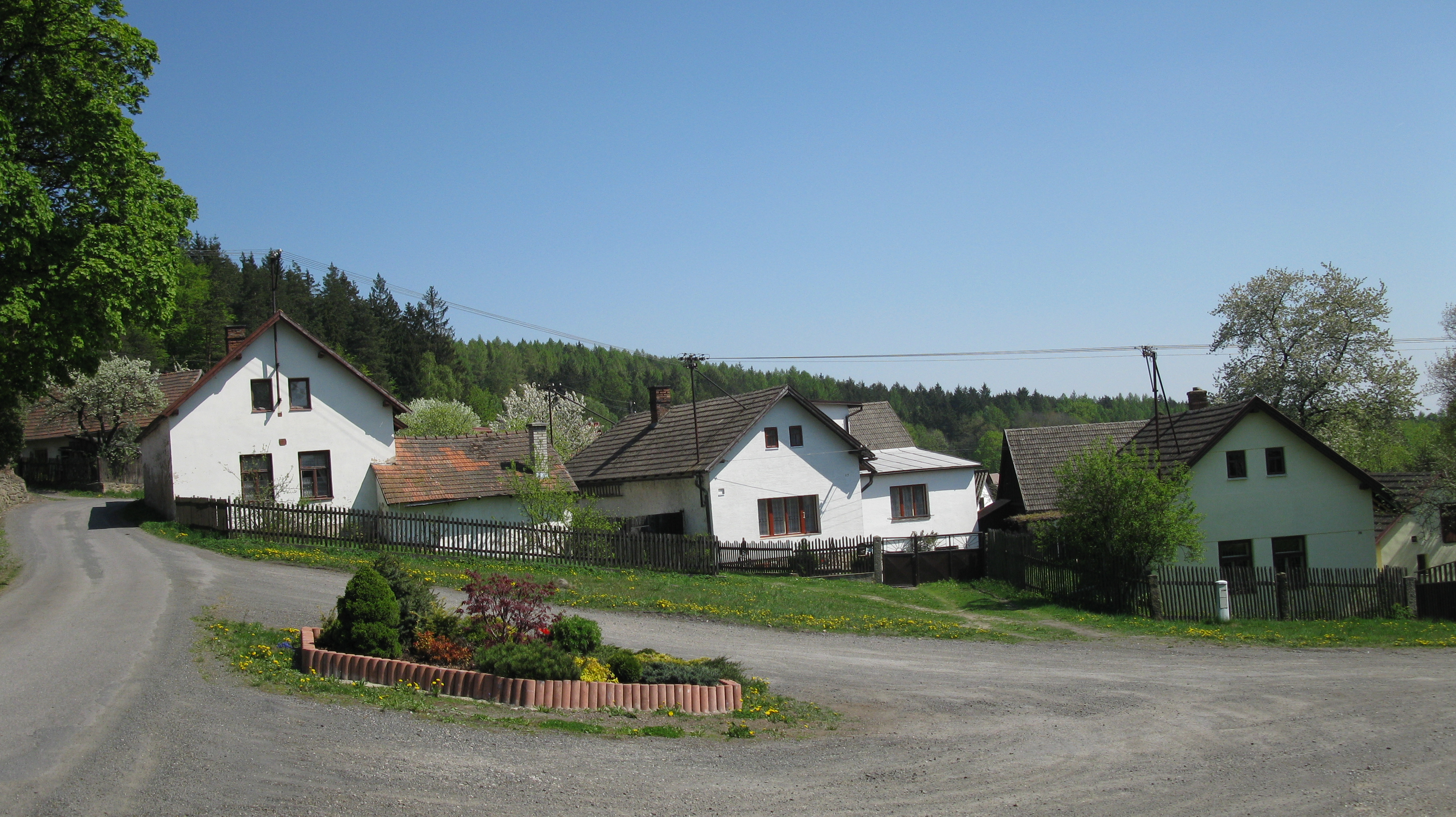
- Centre of Benetice

- Location in the Czech Republic
- Coordinates: 49°41′1″N 15°21′19″E
- Country: Czech Republic
- Region: Vysočina
- District: Havlíčkův Brod
- Municipality: Světlá nad Sázavou
- First mentioned: 1375

Area
  - Total: 3.81 km^{2} (1.47 sq mi)
- Elevation: 555 m (1,821 ft)

Population (2021)
  - Total: 18
  - Density: 4.7/km^{2} (12/sq mi)
- Time zone: UTC+1 (CET)
  - Summer (DST): UTC+2 (CEST)
- Postal code: 582 91

Benetice (German: Benetitz) is a village and administrative part of Světlá nad Sázavou in the Vysočina Region of the Czech Republic. As of 2021, it had 18 inhabitants.

== History ==
There was a glass factory in Benetice. It does not exist anymore, but some local names of places are derived from the parts of the glass factory as name Na sušírnách or Sklárenský Pond.

A linden-tree grows on village green of Benetice. It was planted in 1945.

== Economy ==
There is recreation camp in Benetice. It was used as Pionýr camp and it was used for young people from Hungary, Poland and Germany.

== Gallery ==
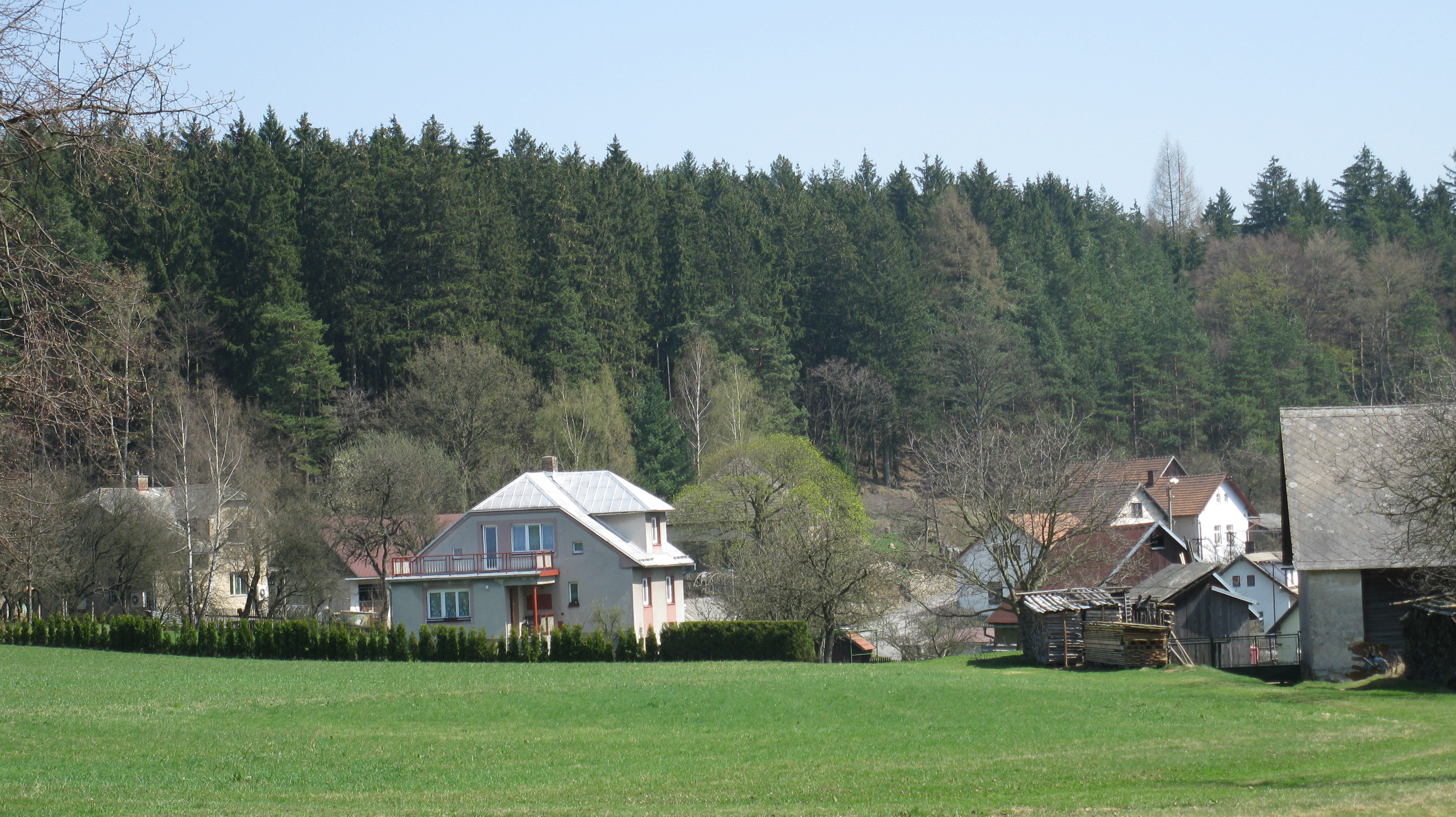

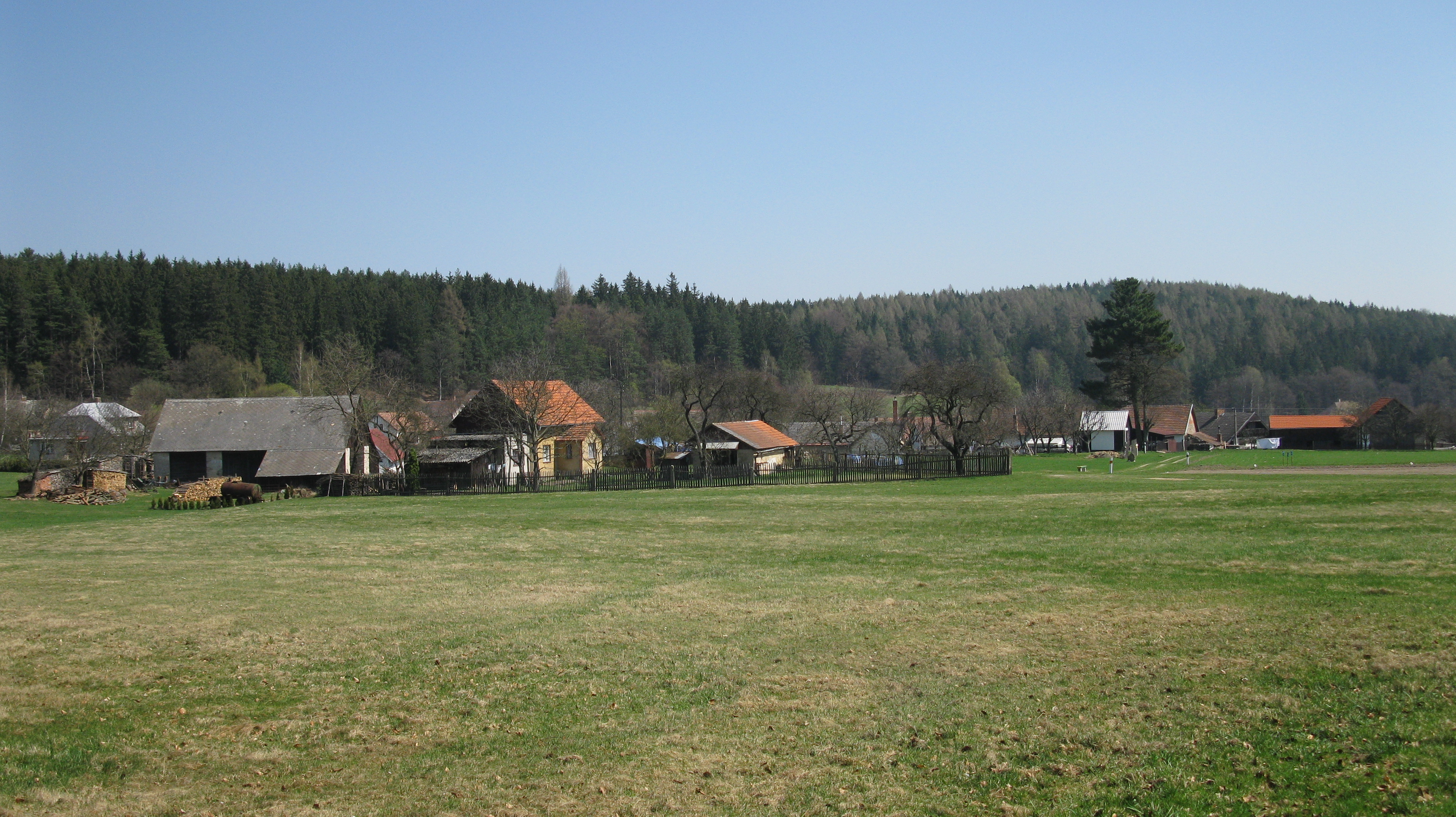

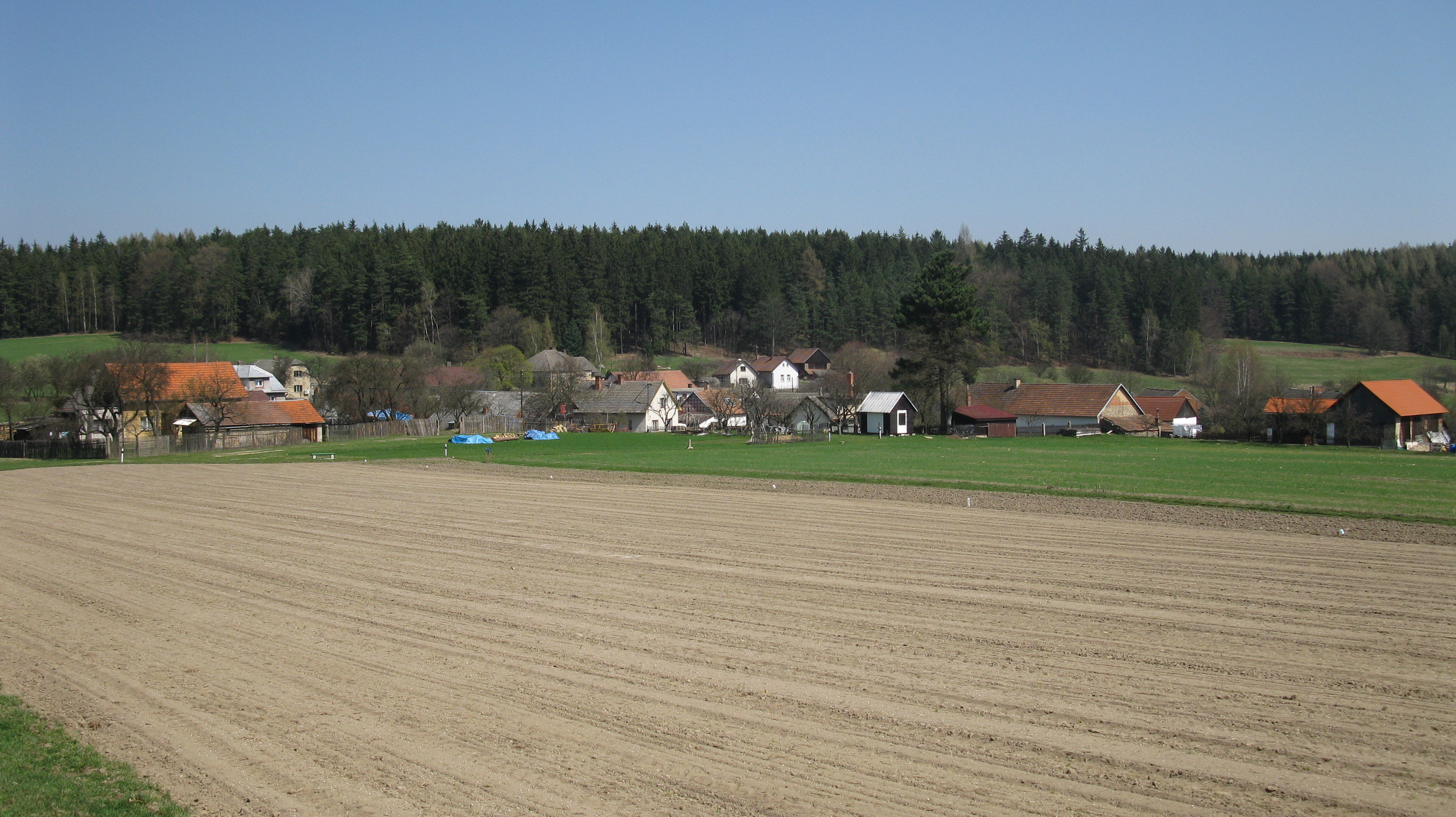

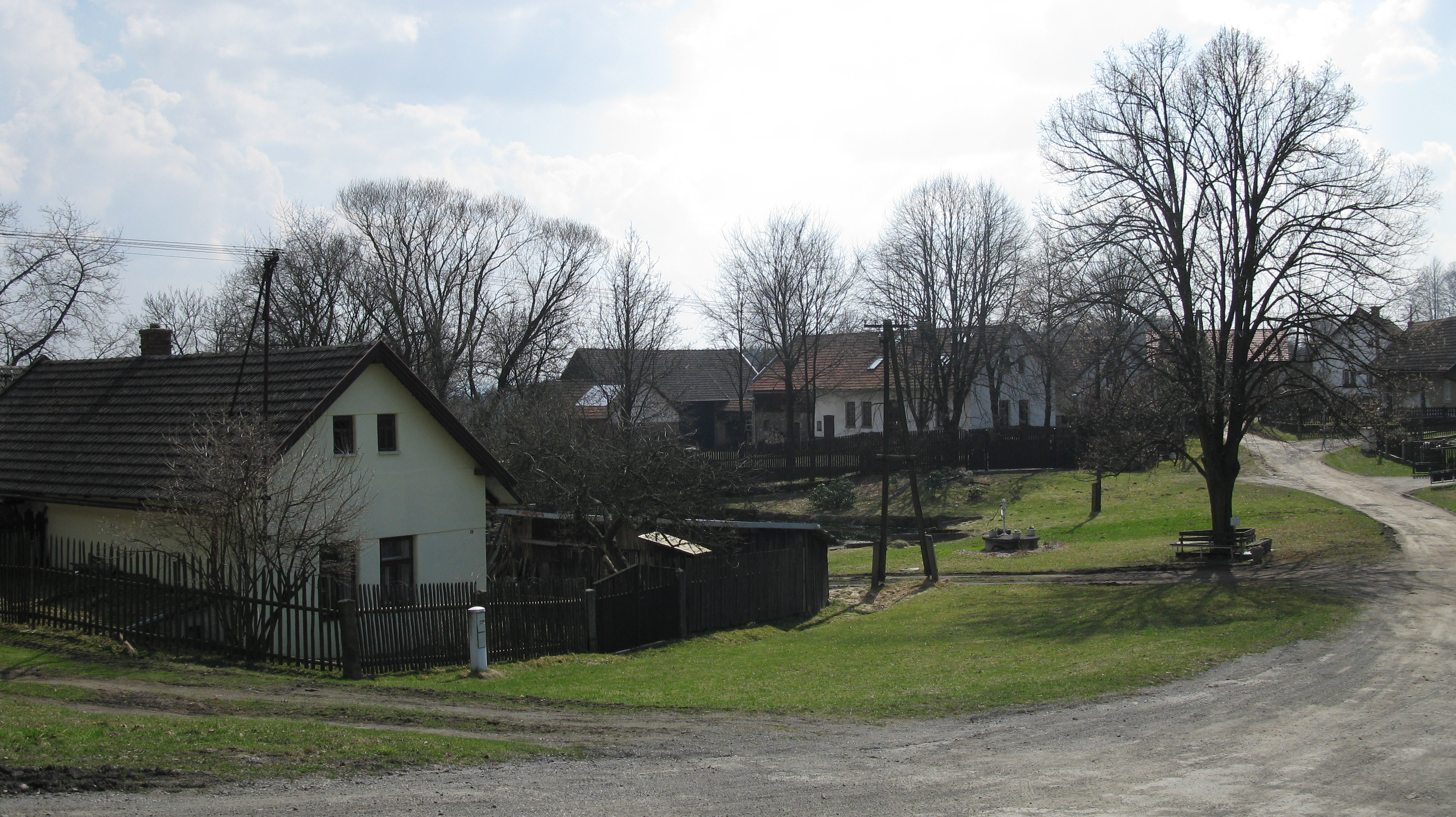

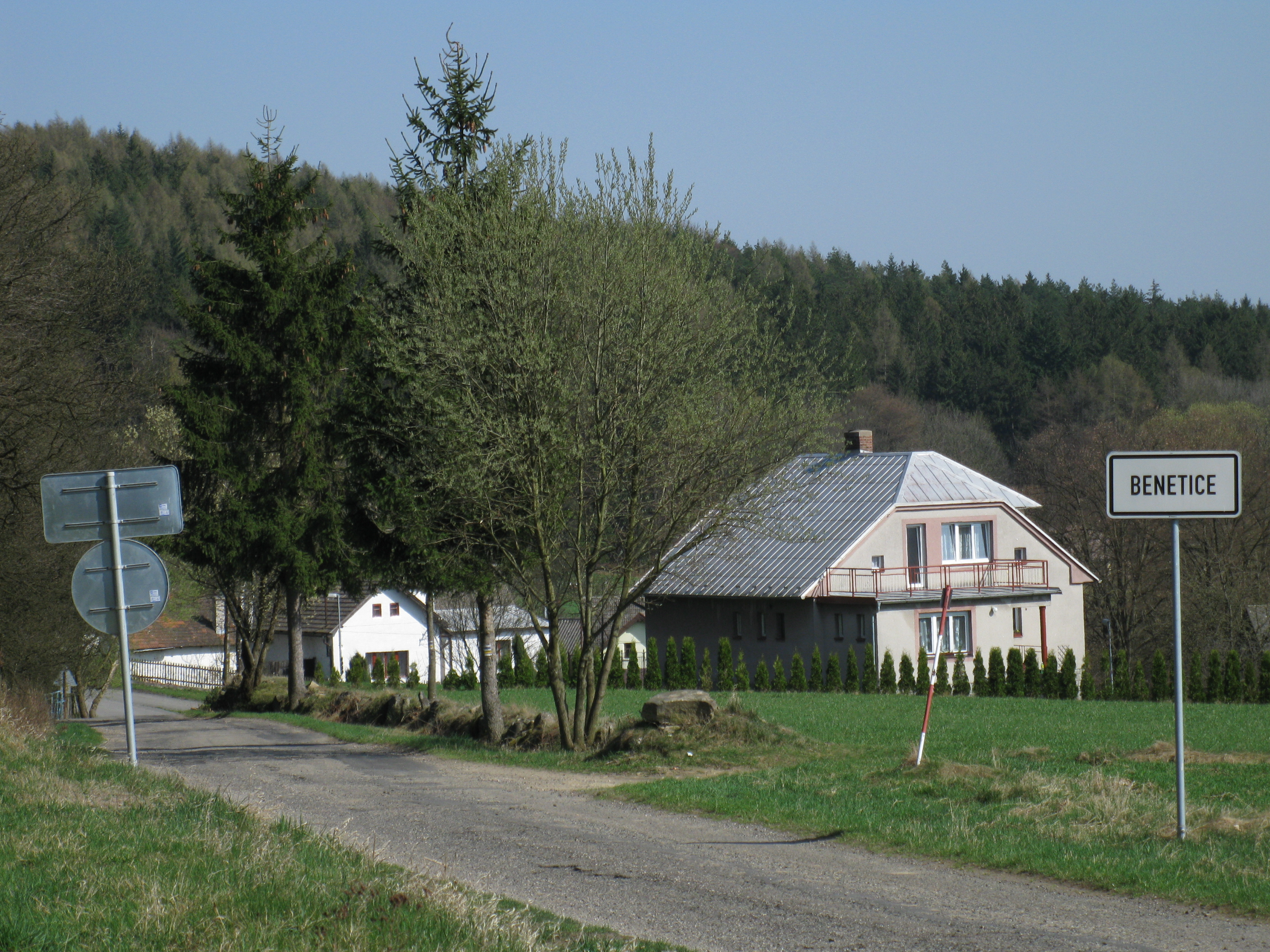

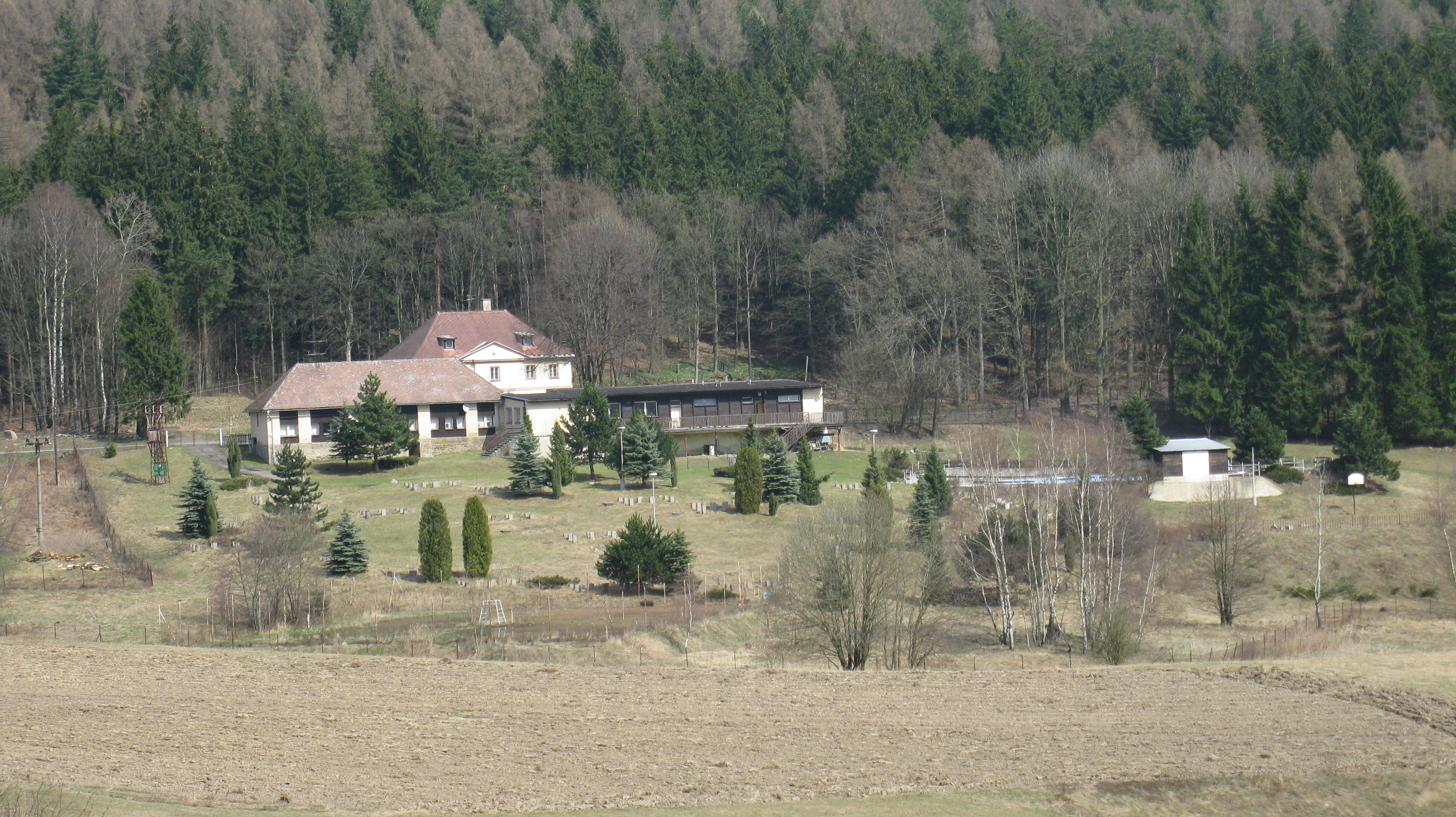
