= Swiss Association of University Women =

Swiss national network of women graduates from higher education

Swiss Association of University Women Graduates
- Abbreviation: SVA, ASFDU, ASL
- Formation: March 22, 1924
- Founder: Mariette Schaetzel, Nelly Schreiber-Favre
- Founded at: Switzerland
- Type: Non-profit organization
- Legal status: Active
- Purpose: Networking of university women, promotion of scientific work and professional interests
- Region served: Switzerland
- Fields: Women's education, professional development
- Members: ~650 (2019)
- Official language: German, French, Italian, Romansh
- President: Doris Boscardin (2016-)
- Main organ: Annual assembly of section delegates
- Parent organization: Graduate Women International
- Affiliations: Alliance F
- Website: https://www.akademikerinnen.ch/

The Swiss Association of University Women (SVA, ASFDU, ASL) (Note: German: Schweizerischer Verband der Akademikerinnen, SVA; French: Association suisse des femmes diplômées des universités, ASFDU; Italian: Associazione svizzera delle laureate, ASL) is the most important national network of women graduates from higher education in Switzerland. The organization is affiliated with Graduate Women International (GWI) and has been a member of Alliance F since 1949.

As of 2019, about 650 women were affiliated with one of the nine sections: Basel, Bern, Fribourg, Geneva, Grisons, Solothurn, Central Switzerland, Vaud, and Zurich.

== History ==
=== Foundation ===
The SVA was founded through the efforts of Mariette Schaetzel, a physician, who initiated both the organization's creation and its admission to GWI (then known as International Federation of University Women, IFUW). Working with Genevan lawyer Nelly Schreiber-Favre, Schaetzel established a network with university women in Bern (centered around pedagogue Anna Louise Grütter). She subsequently founded the Association genevoise de femmes universitaires and encouraged the creation of similar associations in Basel and Zurich.

The members of the initial network and the three associations convened on March 22, 1924, for the constitutive assembly of the national association. Nelly Schreiber-Favre was elected president and Mariette Schaetzel secretary-general by the first general assembly in October 1924. At that time, the various branches of the national organization already counted 220 members. This number grew to approximately 1,500 in the 1980s. As of 2019, about 650 women were affiliated with one of the nine sections: Basel, Bern, Fribourg, Geneva, Grisons, Solothurn, Central Switzerland, Vaud, and Zurich.

=== Organizational structure ===
The SVA defines itself as a politically, culturally, and religiously neutral organization. The statutes, revised in 1925, establish as objectives national and international networking, maintaining friendly relations, and promoting scientific work and professional interests of university women. The promotion of peace and gender equality has remained at the heart of the association's concerns.

Presided over by a central committee, the SVA is organized in a federalist manner with regional sections. The annual assembly of section delegates is the supreme organ of the association. Beyond the four initial sections of Geneva, Bern, Basel, and Zurich, eleven others were subsequently founded, including six around 1970 under the impetus of president Lydia Benz-Burger. Six sections (Neuchâtel, St. Gallen, Schaffhausen, Aargau, Valais, Ticino) have since been dissolved, most during the 1990s.

Until the early 1950s, information for members was limited to brief activity reports and informational texts. Since 1954, they have regularly received a bulletin.

=== International activities and wartime challenges ===
Since its founding, the association has collaborated closely with the umbrella organization IFUW, several congresses of which have taken place in Switzerland (in Geneva in 1929, in Basel and Zurich in 1950, and for its 100th anniversary in Geneva in 2019). The IFUW headquarters has been located in Geneva since the early 1970s.

The rise of the Nazis to power and World War II presented the SVA with new challenges. In 1933, the first German university women requested the association's assistance in their asylum applications to Switzerland. During her term as president (1938-1941), Mariette Schaetzel created a support fund for refugee university women. This fund became the origin of the Hegg Hoffet Fund (still administered by GWI), named after psychologist Blanche Hegg-Hoffet, who served as association president from 1941 to 1947.

== Activities and initiatives ==
=== Professional and educational support ===
To promote university women, the central committee created, among other things, the professional interests commission, which provides statistical material and occasionally employment assistance. The awarding of scholarships and guidance for scholarship searches were also part of the association's tasks. A fund for financing travel and scholarships, partially under IFUW auspices, led to the creation in 1994 of the SVA Scholarship Foundation (dissolved in 2016). The various sections of the association award scientific prizes.

=== Public engagement ===
To develop its public relations, the SVA participated in the Swiss national exhibitions for women's work (Saffa) in 1928 and 1958, the Swiss National Exhibition of 1939, and the Eurêka national research exhibition of 1991. The association also published brochures on academic professions as well as more substantial works such as Das Frauenstudium an den Schweizer Hochschulen (1928), one of the first studies concerning university women in Switzerland.

The political neutrality established by the statutes did not prevent the central committee and sections from promoting gender equality and educational policy or debating current political issues during meetings. Many association members notably engaged in the fight for women's suffrage. After its introduction at the federal level in 1971, several SVA representatives were elected to parliament. The association has continued its political activities in recent years, notably by joining the Interparty Alliance of Women Politicians that supports Equal Pay Day.

== Leadership ==
The SVA has been led by a series of presidents since its founding:

- 1924–1929: Nelly Schreiber-Favre
- 1929–1932: Ruth Speiser
- 1932–1935: Antoinette Quinche
- 1935–1938: Jeanne Eder-Schwyzer
- 1938–1941: Mariette Schaetzel
- 1941–1947: Blanche Hegg-Hoffet
- 1947–1950: Alice Keller
- 1950–1953: Anne-Marie Du Bois
- 1953–1956: Marguerite Henrici-Pietzcker
- 1956–1959: Elisabeth Fauconnet-Baudin
- 1959–1962: Helene Thalmann-Antenen
- 1962–1965: Liselott Schucan-Grob
- 1965–1968: Berthe Lang-Porchet
- 1968–1971: Lydia Benz-Burger
- 1971–1974: Helen Pfister-Maguin
- 1974–1977: Simone Wildhaber-Creux
- 1977–1980: Elisabeth Lardelli
- 1980–1983: Isabell Mahrer
- 1983–1986: Huguette de Haller-Bernheim
- 1986–1989: Gertrud Forster
- 1989–1992: Nicole Grin
- 1992–1995: Franziska De Souza-Del Vecchio
- 1995–1996: Marise Paschoud
- 1996–2002: Catherine Bandle
- 2002–2007: Ursulina Mutzner
- 2008–2014: Verena Welti
- 2014–2016: Anita Haldemann
- 2016–present: Doris Boscardin
