= FRÖSI =

East German children's magazine

Logo

FRÖSI was a children's magazine which was published by Junge Welt in the German Democratic Republic (East Germany). The expanded title of the magazine was Fröhlich sein und Singen. It was the magazine for members of the Ernst Thälmann Pioneer Organisation. The word FRÖSI comes from the first line of the at that time familiar pioneer song "Fröhlich sein und singen" ("Being happy and sing"). This title in full length was used until 1965, then the short form replaced it. The first edition was released on 25 June 1953. At first it was published every 6 weeks, from 1956 monthly.

The magazine included comics, articles about nature, science and technology and other contents. A notable amount of the magazine was made up by propaganda. Several issues also included gimmicks.

In 1990 it was renamed tandem. In March 1991 it was discontinued.

In June 2002 Neues Deutschland tried to revive the magazine with a single edition of FRÖSI as a gimmick in the newspaper. In May 2005, FRÖSI started again as a monthly magazine, but was discontinued again that November.
