= Nelly Schreiber-Favre =

Swiss lawyer

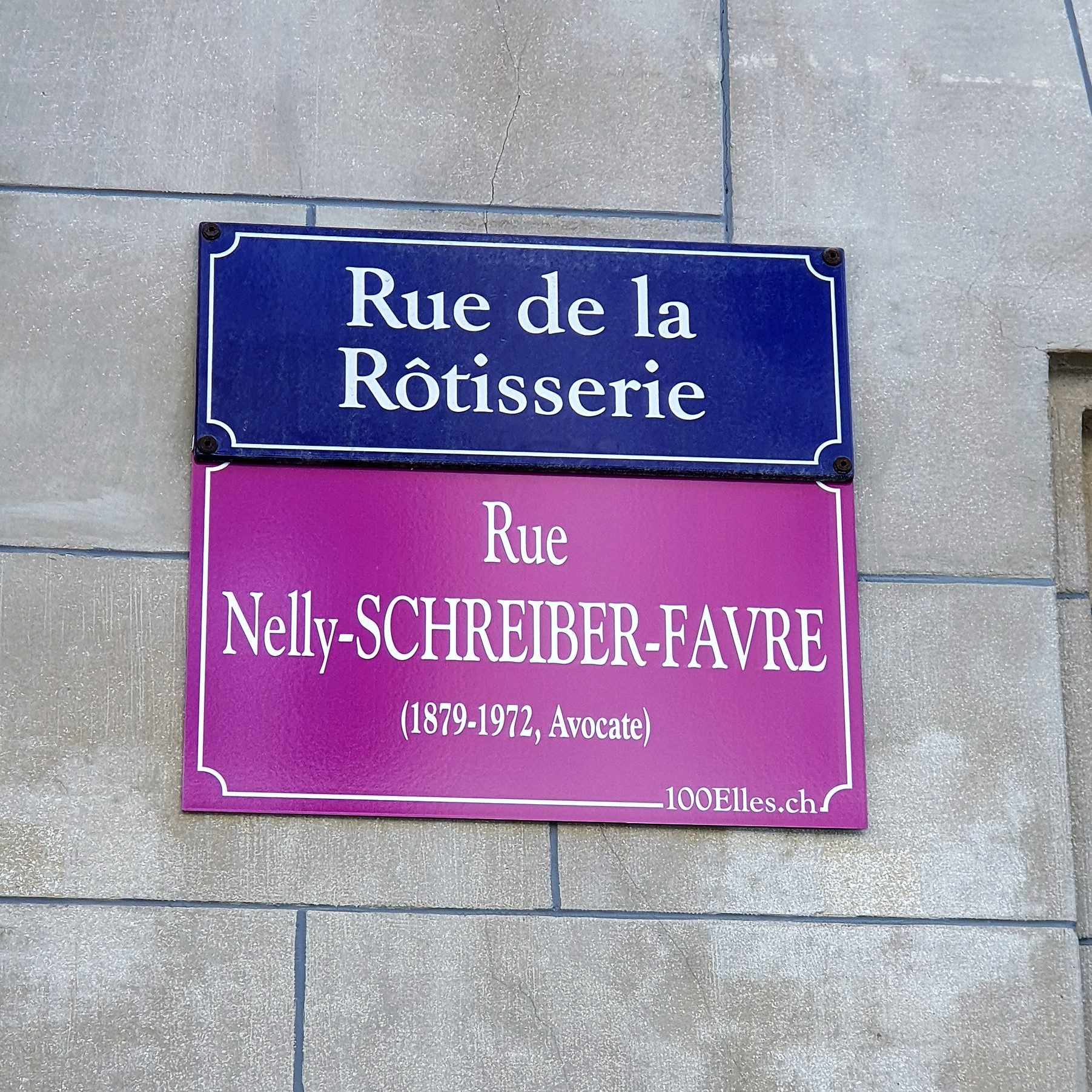

Nelly Schreiber-Favre (October 31, 1879 – May 5, 1972), was a Swiss lawyer who became the first sworn lawyer in Geneva. After co-founding the Swiss Association of University Women (ASFDU) with Mariette Schaetzel in 1924 on the advice of Émilie Gourd, she became its first president. Being Vice-President of the International Federation of University Women (1926-1932), she represented the latter in the Commission for Intellectual Co-operation of the League of Nations from 1939 to 1945.
