= Thalman =

Thalman is a surname. Notable people with the surname include:

- Bob Thalman (1922–2012), American football player and coach
- Stefanie Thalman (born 1958), Swiss shoe designer

== See also ==
- Thalmann
- Thälmann
