= Sükhbaatar Mongolian Pioneers Organization =

Sükhbaatar Mongolian Pioneers Organization Сүхбаатарын нэрэмжит Монголын пионерийн байгууллага
- Founded: 8 May 1925
- Dissolved: 1990
- Headquarters: Ulaanbaatar, Mongolia
- Ideology: Communism; Marxism-Leninism
- Mother party: Mongolian Revolutionary Youth League
- State party: Mongolian People's Revolutionary Party
- International affiliation: International Committee of Children's and Adolescents' Movements
- Newspaper: Pioneriyn Unen (lit. Pioneers' Truth)

The Sükhbaatar Mongolian Pioneers Organization (Mongolian: Сүхбаатарын нэрэмжит Монголын пионерийн байгууллага, romanized: Sükhbaataryn neremjit Mongolyn pionyeriin baiguullaga), shortened as the Mongolian Pioneers Organization, was a pioneer movement in the Mongolian People's Republic. The organization was named after the Mongolian military leader and revolutionary hero Damdin Sükhbaatar.

== History ==
The organization was founded in May 1925. Its activities were monitored by the Mongolian Revolutionary Youth League, the national youth wing established in 1921.

Like the youth league, the Pioneers Organization had as its task to involve the children in active work and service in fulfilling party goals. It sponsored rallies focused on labor themes; provided medals for good progress in work and study; and encouraged the ideological, moral, and educational development of children. The organization also hosted sports competitions, art reviews, and festivals. In the summer, the organization operated camps to enhance the physical training and the education of youths.

Pioneer girl mannequin displayed at the National Museum of Mongolia

The Central Council of the organization published, together with the Central Committee of the Mongolian Revolutionary Youth League, Pioneriyn Unen (Pioneers' Truth) with 84 issues annually. As of the late 1980s, it was circulated to some 175,000 subscribers.

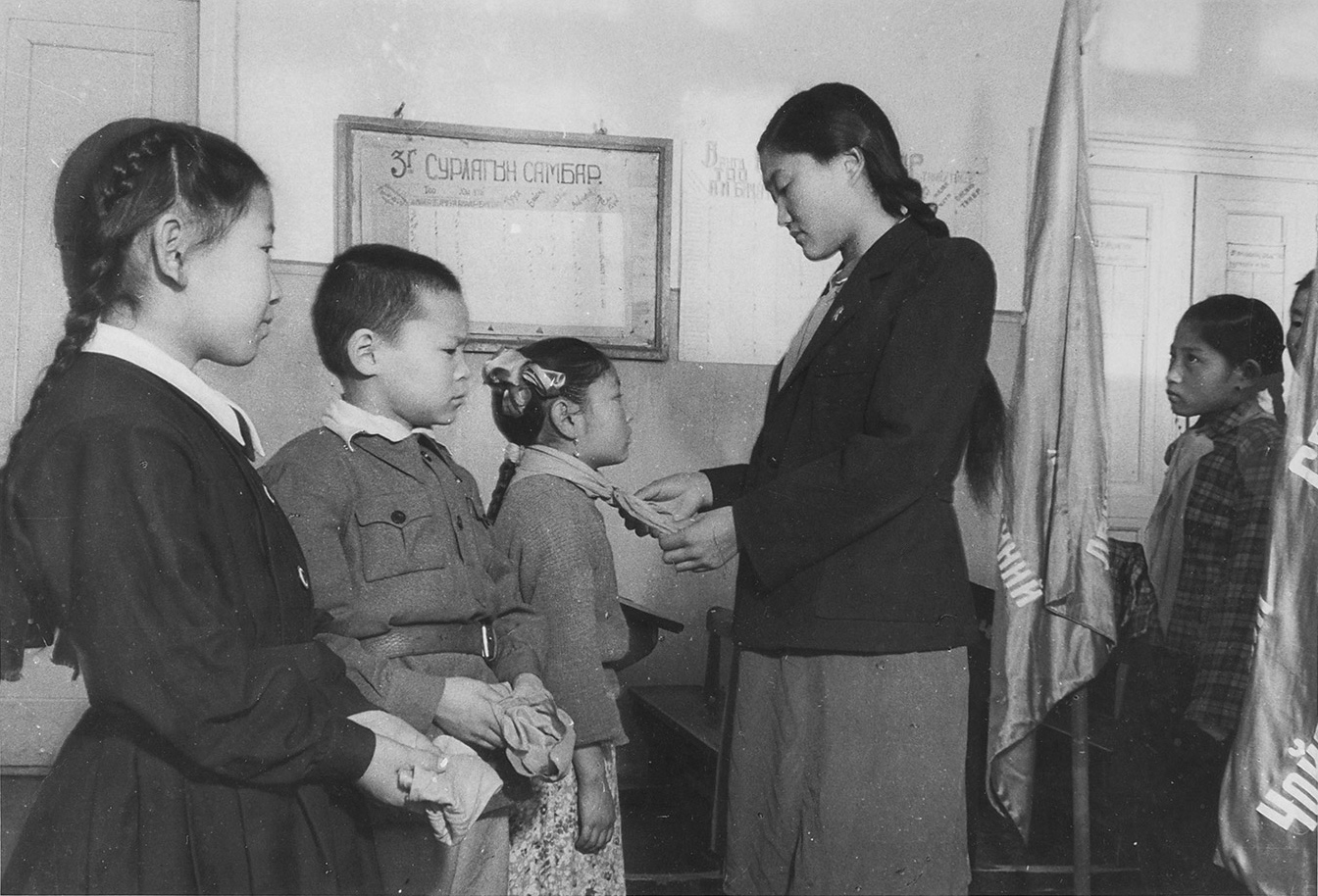
Pioneer admittance ceremony in School No. 1 of Ulaanbaatar, 1950

In the late 1980s, the organization had a membership of around 360,000. Its members were children aged 10 to 15. As of 1989, the chairman of the Central Council of the organization was included as a secretary in the Central Committee of the Mongolian Revolutionary Youth League. As of 1990, N. Boloramaa was the chairman of the Central Council of the Pioneer Organization, and N. Batjargal was the deputy chairman.

== Motto ==
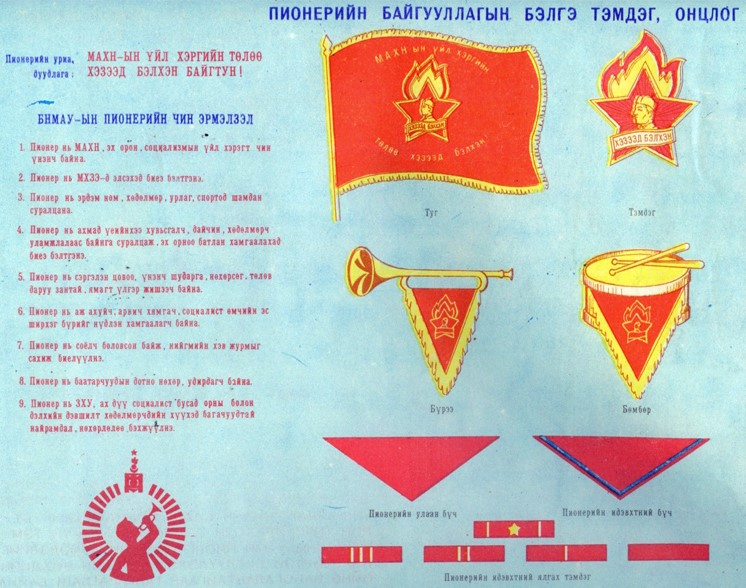
Insignia, symbols, mottos of the Mongolian Pioneers Organization

1. Summons - "Always be ready for the cause of the Mongolian People's Revolutionary Party!" (Mongolian: Монгол Ардын Хувьсгалт намын үйл хэргийн төлөө хэзээд бэлхэн байгтун!)
2. Response - "Always ready" (Mongolian: Хэзээд бэлхэн)
