= Mongolian Revolutionary Youth League =

Youth movement in the Mongolian People's Republic

Mongolian Revolutionary Youth League Монголын Хувьсгалт Залуучуудын эвлэл
- Emblem of the MRYL
- Founded: 25 August 1921
- Dissolved: 17 January 1991
- Succeeded by: Mongolian Youth Federation
- Headquarters: Ulaanbaatar
- Membership: 235,000 (1986)
- Ideology: 1921–1990: Communism; Marxism–Leninism
- Mother party: Mongolian People's Revolutionary Party (until 1991)
- International affiliation: WFDY; IUS
- Newspaper: Zaluuchuudyn Ünen (Youths' Truth)

The Mongolian Revolutionary Youth League (Mongolian: Монголын хувьсгалт залуучуудын эвлэл, МХЗЭ, romanized: Mongolyn khuvisgalt zaluuchuudyn evlel) was a youth movement in the Mongolian People's Republic (MPR) and youth-wing of the Mongolian People's Revolutionary Party from 1921 to 1991. Founded in 1921, the Youth League had a membership of 235,000 people aged between fifteen and twenty-eight in 1986. The MRYL was a significant element in reinforcing the party ranks and in contributing to social and economic development in the MPR. The Party Program of the MPRP described the Youth League as the party's "militant assistant and reliable reserve." Following the Democratic Revolution of 1990, the league re-organized itself and was succeeded by the Mongolian Youth Federation in 1991.

== History ==
On August 25, 1921, on the initiative of commander Damdin Sükhbaatar, a group of mostly students who had studied in the Russian Empire during the period of the Bogd Khanate, met in the capital and established the first Mongolian youth organization was established under the name of "Youth Union to Eliminate the Threshold." At the outset, Khorloogiin Choibalsan, who served as the Deputy Chief of the Mongolian People's Army, was elected the secretary of the Central Committee of the MRYL.

The main activity of the union was to propagate the policies and decisions of the Mongolian People's Revolutionary Party to the public. In 1922, at the Congress of the Revolutionary Youth of the East in Moscow, it established contacts with organizations such as the Comintern's Young Communist International and the CPSU's Komsomol. The first congress of the MRYL was held in July 1922 in Niislel Khuree, capital city later renamed Ulaanbaatar in 1924.

Starting from 1990, amidst the pro-democracy demonstrations, the league re-organized and distanced itself from the MPRP. At the twentieth congress in 1991, members established a new youth and community organization on the basis of the organization. On January 17, 1991, the Mongolian Youth Forum was organized, the successor Mongolian Youth Federation was established, and the federation's declaration and charter were approved.

== Subordinate organizations and influence ==
=== Children's organization ===
The Sükhbaatar Mongolian Pioneers Organization, founded in May 1925, was supervised by the MRYL. With a membership, in the late 1980s, of 360,000, it served children ages ten to fifteen. Similar to the Youth League, the Pioneers Organization was meant to involve children in active work and service in fulfilling party goals and to encourage their ideological, moral and educational development.

=== Military ===
Up to two thirds of the Mongolian People's Army units were members of the party or the Mongolian Revolutionary Youth League. The league played an active role in preparing the Mongolian youth for military service by instilling patriotism and by encouraging participation in reserve training programs to maintain a high level of physical fitness.

== Symbols ==
Early swastika and red star emblem of the MRYL, used from 1921 to 1924.

Early taijitu and red star emblem of the MRYL, used from 1925 to 1942.

Emblem of the MRYL, used from 1942 to 1991.

== Leaders (First Secretaries of the Central Committee) ==
- Choijilyn Purevjav (1958–1975)
- Lodongiin Tudev (1975–1984)
- Tserendorjiin Narangerel (1984–1990*)

== Notable members ==
- Peljidiin Genden - Prime Minister of the MPR (1932–1936)
- Sükhbaataryn Yanjmaa - widow of Damdin Sükhbaatar, first Mongolian female head of state
- Tsendiin Damdinsüren - writer, linguist, the first People's Artist of the MPR
- Punsalmaagiin Ochirbat - first President of Mongolia (1990–1997)
- Tsakhiagiin Elbegdorj - fourth President of Mongolia from (2009–2017)
- Danzangiin Lündeejantsan - Chairman of the State Great Khural (2007–2008)
- Damdiny Demberel - Chairman of the State Great Khural (2008–2012)
- Chimediin Saikhanbileg - Prime Minister of Mongolia (2014–2016)

== Awards ==
- Order of Military Merit (1931)
- Order of the Red Banner of Labor (1939)
- Order of Sukhbaatar

== See also ==
- Komsomol
- Free German Youth
- Communist Youth League of China
- Ho Chi Minh Communist Youth Union
