= Karl Grütter =

Swiss pastor and educator (1832–1899)

- Born: 19 May 1832; Bern, Switzerland
- Died: 22 January 1899 (aged 66); Hindelbank, Bern, Switzerland
- Occupations: Pastor; educator
- Spouses: Louise Ris (m. 1857) Anna Maria Isler (m. 1876)
- Children: Anna Louise Grütter
- Father: Jakob Grütter

Karl Grütter (19 May 1832 – 22 January 1899) was a Swiss pastor and educator in the canton of Bern. From 1868 he was director of the cantonal women teachers' seminary in Hindelbank, where he was also the pastor. He was president of the Bernese church synod in 1882–1886 and 1890–1894, and in 1886 he co-founded the home economics school in Worb.

== Biography ==
Karl Grütter was born on 19 May 1832 in Bern, the son of Jakob Grütter, a tailor and shopkeeper (Krämer) in Bern. In 1857 he married Louise Ris, daughter of Rudolf Ris, and in 1876 Anna Maria Isler, daughter of Anton Isler. His daughter with Anna Maria Isler, Anna Louise Grütter, was born in Hindelbank in 1879.

Grütter studied theology in Bern and passed the state examination in 1855. From 1855 to 1857 he held several posts as a curate (Vikariate), and in 1856 he was an army chaplain (Feldprediger) during the border occupation (Grenzbesetzung). From 1857 to 1863 he was the German-speaking pastor in Courtelary, and in 1863 he moved to Meikirch.

In 1866 Grütter became a teacher of religion, German and history at the cantonal school (Kantonsschule) in Bern. From 1868 he was director of the cantonal women teachers' seminary (Lehrerinnenseminar) in Hindelbank, where he also became the pastor.

Grütter carried out extensive educational and pastoral work, among other things as a member of the commission for teaching materials (Lehrmittelkommission), as president of the Bernese commission for youth literature (Jugendschriftenkommission), as president of the Bernese church synod (Kirchensynode) in 1882–1886 and 1890–1894, as a co-founder of the home economics school (Haushaltungsschule) in Worb in 1886, as a member of the board of the Viktoria girls' educational institution (Mädchenerziehungsanstalt Viktoria) and as president of the pastors' association (Pastoralverein) of Burgdorf. This went together with intensive writing for publication. He died in Hindelbank on 22 January 1899.

== Bibliography ==
- Sammlung bernischer Biographien, 5, 315–321
