= Walter Thalmann =

Swiss civil servant (1904–1977)

- Born: 25 March 1904; Basel, Switzerland
- Died: 12 November 1977 (aged 73); Bern, Switzerland
- Education: University of Bern
- Occupations: Lawyer; civil servant
- Spouses: Helene Antenen (m. 1933): Gertrud Marie Aeschlimann
- Parents: Jakob Thalmann (father); Louise Melanie Müller (mother)

Walter Thalmann (25 March 1904 – 12 November 1977) was a Swiss lawyer and civil servant. From 1967 to 1969 he was director of the Federal Justice Division (Eidgenössische Justizabteilung). He distinguished himself in handling difficult matters in constitutional and administrative law.

== Biography ==
Walter Thalmann was born on 25 March 1904 in Basel, the son of Jakob Thalmann, a telegraphist, and Louise Melanie née Müller. In 1933 he married Helene Antenen; his second wife was Gertrud Marie Aeschlimann, daughter of Wilhelm Friedrich Aeschlimann.

Thalmann studied law at the University of Bern, obtained his doctorate in law (Dr. iur.) in 1929 and was admitted to the bar (Anwaltspatent) in 1930. From 1930 he was secretary of the Department of Justice, Police and the Army (Justiz-, Polizei- und Armeedepartement) of the canton of Thurgau and secretary of the indictment chamber (Anklagekammer).

In 1938 Thalmann became an official (Beamter), in 1948 a deputy (Adjunkt), in 1955 deputy head of division, in 1959 vice director and from 1967 to 1969 director of the Federal Justice Division. He distinguished himself in handling difficult matters in constitutional and administrative law, among other things as a member of the working group on problems of legal harmonization in the field of industrial property protection (gewerblicher Rechtsschutz). He died in Bern on 12 November 1977.

== Bibliography ==
- Neue Zürcher Zeitung, 1 April 1969
- Der Bund, 15 November 1977
