= Young Pioneers (Mali) =

Socialist youth organization in Mali

The Young Pioneers/Jeunes Pionniers of Mali (1960–?) were socialist youth brigades established by the Sudanese Union – African Democratic Rally of Modibo Keïta.
