= Young Pioneers (Norway) =

Socialist children's organization

Young Pioneers (Norwegian: Unge Pionerer, UP) was a socialist children's organization in Norway. It was founded in 1952, as a continuation of the interbellum Pioneer League of Norway. Initially the organization was firmly connected to the Communist Party of Norway, but in the 1970s it became more independent as parents affiliated with the Socialist Left Party brought their children to the organization.

On May 1, 1976, UP began publishing Ung Røst.

== International affiliation ==
UP was the Norwegian affiliate of CIMEA, and participated in international and Nordic pioneer camps.
