= José Martí Pioneer Organization =

Cuban youth organisation

José Martí Pioneer Organization Organización de Pioneros José Martí
- Founded: 1961
- Headquarters: Palacio de Pioneros, Havana
- Mother party: Communist Party of Cuba
- International affiliation: WFDY; ICCAM

José Martí Pioneer Organization

Pioneer	Girl pioneer

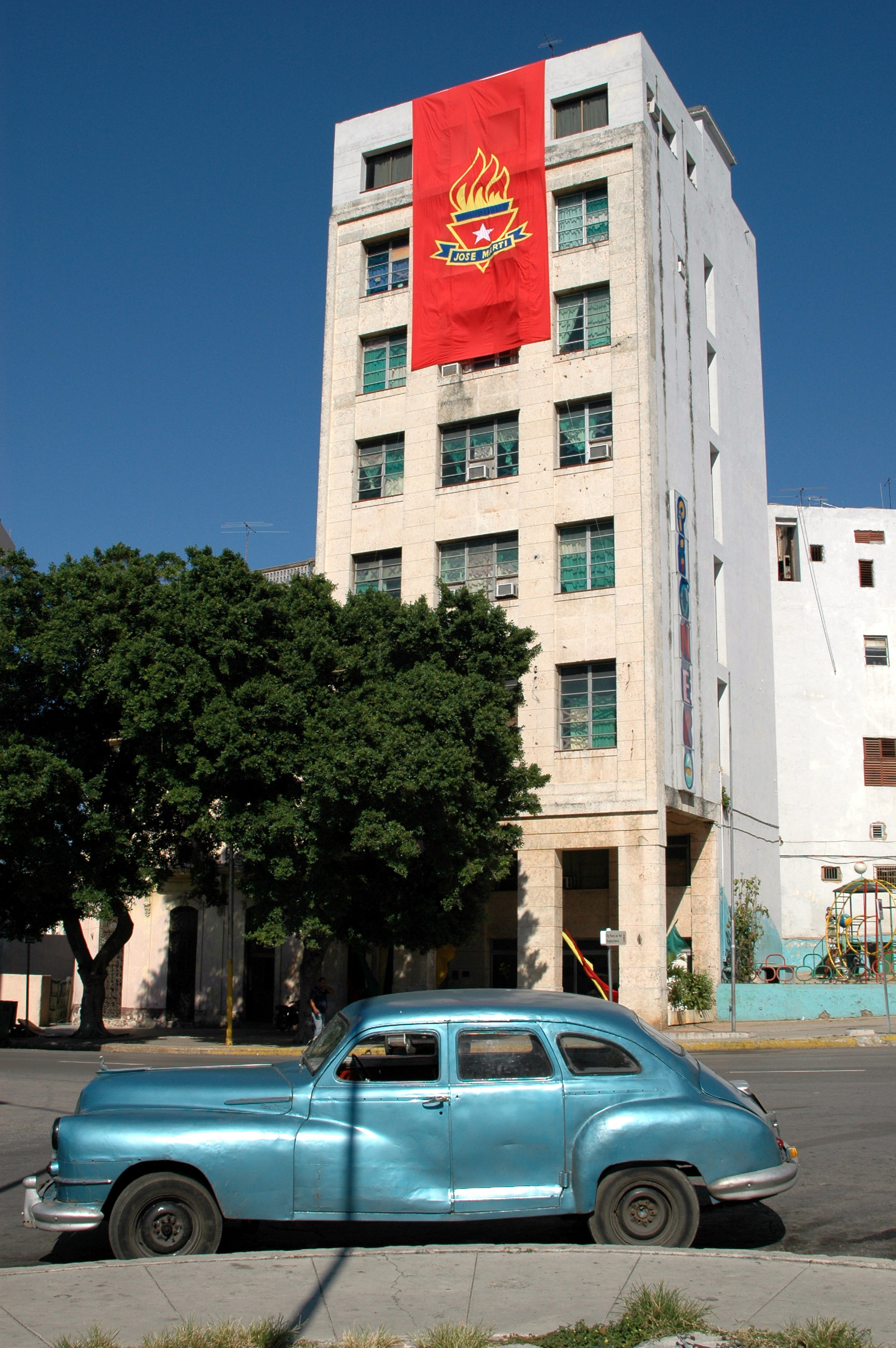
An OPJM building in Havana

José Martí Pioneer Organization (Spanish: Organización de Pioneros José Martí - OPJM) is a Cuban youth organization established in 1961, created as a replacement for the banned Asociación de Scouts de Cuba. The organization gets its name from Cuban writer and national hero José Martí.

== Overview ==
The José Martí Pioneer Organization groups primary and secondary students, until 9th grade. The initiation takes place with a traditional act of giving a neckerchief, blue or red depending on the student's level; from that moment it forms a part of the scholastic uniform. In high school the neckerchief is replaced by a badge consisting of the bars with colors of the national flag and to the right, Che's signature; the symbol measures approximately 1.5 cm by 10 cm, in some cases is the symbol of the high school, and sewn directly on the white uniform shirt. These are organized into three sub-age groups per grade level. Pioneers from the 1st to 3rd grades are Moncada Pioneers (Pionero Moncadista), while 4th to 9th graders are the regular Pioneers, split into junior ranks (Grades 4 to 6) and senior ranks (Grades 7 to 9).

The OPJM counts a section of exploration and camping named "Explorers Pioneers Movement" (Movimiento de Pioneros Exploradores, MPE).

In 2001 it was elected to the Global 500 Roll of Honour of the United Nations Environment Programme for its environmental activities.

Its motto is: "Pioneers for communism: Let us be like Che!" (Pioneros para el comunismo: ¡Seamos como el Che!)

== Gallery ==
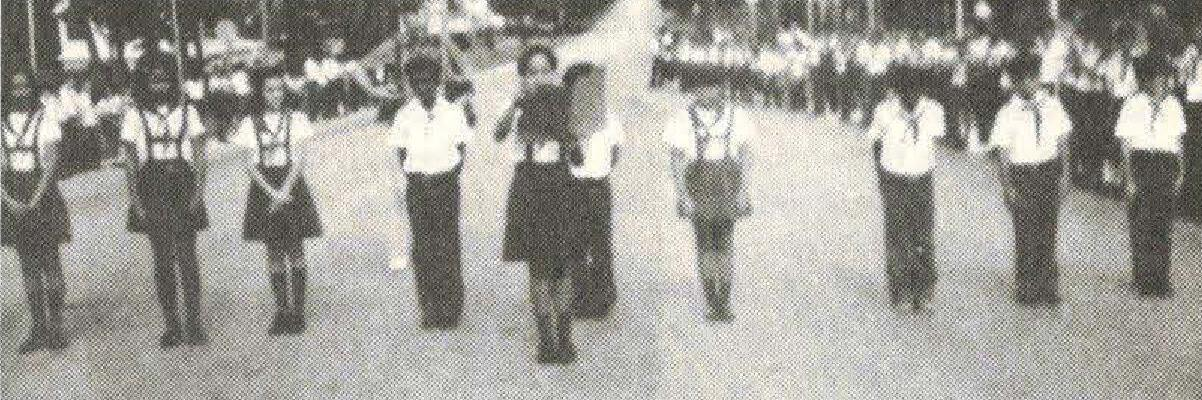
Members of José Martí Pioneer Organization, 1979

Old logo of the "Pioneers Explorers Movement", part of OPJM

Che's signature

== See also ==
- Young Communist League
