= Young Pioneers (Niger) =

The Young Pioneers/Jeunes Pionniers of Niger (1961–1974) was a non-communist youth paramilitary group, one of several set up in post independence Africa, funded by and modeled on the Israeli Nahal ("Fighting Pioneer Youth").
