= SS Heidberg =

Cargo steamship

History
- Name: 1943: Heidberg; 1945: Empire Convention; 1946: Ernst Thaelmann
- Namesake: 1946: Ernst Thälmann
- Owner: 1943: Aug. Bolten Wm. Miller’s Nachfolger; 1945: Ministry of War Transport; 1945: Ministry of Transport; 1946: USSR
- Operator: 1945: Ellerman's Wilson Line
- Port of registry: 1943: (Nazi Germany) Hamburg; 1945: (United Kingdom) London; 1946: (Soviet Union)
- Builder: Helsingborgs Varfs A/B
- Launched: 6 March 1943
- Completed: 1943
- Identification: UK official number 180342; call sign GMFM
- Fate: deleted from registers, 1970

General characteristics
- Tonnage: 1,714 GRT, 847 NRT
- Length: 277.6 ft (84.6 m)
- Beam: 41.4 ft (12.6 m)
- Depth: 16.2 ft (4.9 m)
- Decks: 2
- Propulsion: 1 × screw; 1 × triple expansion engine, exhaust steam turbine & steam compressor
- Sensors & processing systems: wireless direction finding; echo sounding device

SS Heidberg was a cargo steamship that was built in 1943 in Sweden for a German shipping company. The Allies in 1945 took it for war reparations. She was renamed Empire Convention, and spent about nine months under United Kingdom ownership and management. In 1946 she was transferred to the Soviet Union, who renamed her Эрнст Те́льман – Ernst Thälmann. Her fate is not recorded.

== Building ==
Helsingborgs Varfs AB built Heidberg in Helsingborg, and launched her on 6 March 1943. Her registered length was 277.6 ft (84.6 m), her beam was 41.4 ft (12.6 m), and her depth was 16.2 ft (4.9 m). Her tonnages were 1,714 GRT and 847 NRT.

She had a single screw, driven by a Helsingborgs Varfs three-cylinder triple expansion engine. Steam from its low-pressure cylinder drove an exhaust steam turbine, which powered a compressor. The compressor increased the pressure of steam exhausted from the high-pressure cylinder before it entered the intermediate-pressure cylinder. The pressure also increased the temperature of the steam. This reduced condensation in the intermediate- and low-pressure cylinders, increasing the engine's fuel efficiency and power.

== Heidberg and Empire Convention ==
Heidberg's first owner was Aug. Bolten Wm. Miller's Nachfolger, who registered her in Hamburg. After the German surrender in 1945, Allied forces seized her at Szczecin.

The UK Ministry of War Transport took her over, renamed her Empire Convention, and registered her in London. Her UK official number 180342 and her call sign was GMFM. The MoWT appointed Ellerman's Wilson Line to manage her.

== Ernst Thaelmann ==
Empire Convention was one of a number of ships that the UK transferred to the Soviet Union in February 1946 under the Potsdam Agreement. The Soviet Union renamed her after Ernst Thälmann, who had led the Communist Party of Germany until 1933, and had been executed in Buchenwald concentration camp in 1944.

Ernst Thaelmann became part of the Sakhalin Shipping Company fleet in the Soviet Far East. Lloyd's Register still recorded the ship as extant in 1959. She was deleted from international shipping registers in 1970.

== Bibliography ==
- Hardy, AC (1954) [1948]. Modern Marine Engineering. Vol. I (revised ed.). London: Caxton Publishing.
- "Supplement to the Register". Lloyd's Register of Shipping (PDF). Vol. I–Steamers and Motorships of 300 tons gross and over. London: Lloyd's Register of Shipping. 1945 – via Southampton City Council.
- "Steamers and Motorships". Lloyd's Register of Shipping. London: Lloyd's Register of Shipping. 1946 – via Internet Archive.
- Lloyd's Register of Shipping. London: Lloyd's Register of Shipping. 1959 – via Internet Archive.
- Mitchell, WH; Sawyer, LA (1995). The Empire Ships. London, New York, Hamburg, Hong Kong: Lloyd's of London Press Ltd. ISBN 1-85044-275-4.
