= Helene Thalmann-Antenen =

Swiss lawyer (1906–1976)

- Born: Helene Antenen; 28 March 1906; Biel, Switzerland
- Died: 21 March 1976 (aged 69); Bern, Switzerland
- Occupation: Lawyer
- Spouse: Walter Thalmann (m. 1933)
- Parents: Friedrich Antenen (father); Anna Martha Hänni (mother)
- Awards: Ida Somazzi Prize (1971)

Helene Thalmann-Antenen (born Helene Antenen; also Helene Thalmann; 28 March 1906 – 21 March 1976) was a Swiss lawyer. From 1943 she headed the legal advice office of the Bernese Women's Federation (Bernischer Frauenbund), and from 1959 to 1962 she was president of the Swiss Association of University Women. She lectured for the Bernese women's suffrage movement and published on collective labor agreements and the legal status of women.

== Biography ==
Helene Antenen was born on 28 March 1906 in Biel, the daughter of Friedrich Antenen, a secondary school teacher (Gymnasiallehrer), and Anna Martha née Hänni. She passed her Matura in Biel, studied law in Bern and obtained her doctorate in 1929. In 1933 she married Walter Thalmann. From 1950 she was a lawyer with her own practice.

From 1943 Thalmann-Antenen headed the legal advice office (Rechtsberatungsstelle) of the Bernese Women's Federation. She was president of the association of Bernese university women (Vereinigung bernischer Akademikerinnen) from 1950 to 1959 and of the Swiss Association of University Women from 1959 to 1962, and she worked with the International Federation of University Women. She gave lectures for the Bernese women's suffrage movement. From 1957 to 1970 she worked on the commission for legal and insurance questions of the Federation of Swiss Women's Associations (BSF). From 1969 she was president of the Swiss Association for Social Policy (Schweizerische Vereinigung für Sozialpolitik). She also sat on extra-parliamentary commissions.

Her publications include works on collective labor agreements (Gesamtarbeitsverträge) and on the legal status of women. In 1971 she received the Ida Somazzi Prize. She died on 21 March 1976 in Bern.

== Bibliography ==
- B. Knobel, Frauen in unserem Land, 1970, 111–117
- Der Bund, 28 March 1976

=== Archives ===
- Swiss Economic Archives (Schweizerisches Wirtschaftsarchiv), Basel, documentation collection
