= Ernst Thälmann Pioneer Organisation session =

Regular gathering of Ernst Thälmann Pioneer Organisation members

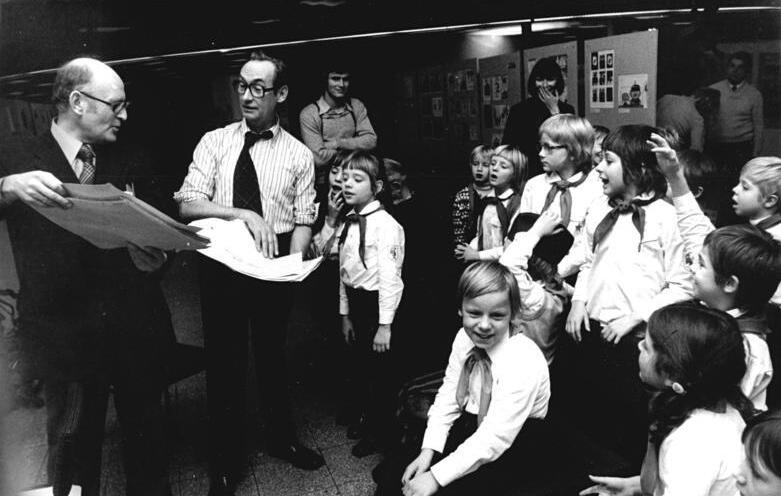
Schoolchildren from the Ernst Thälmann Pioneer Organisation visit an exhibition

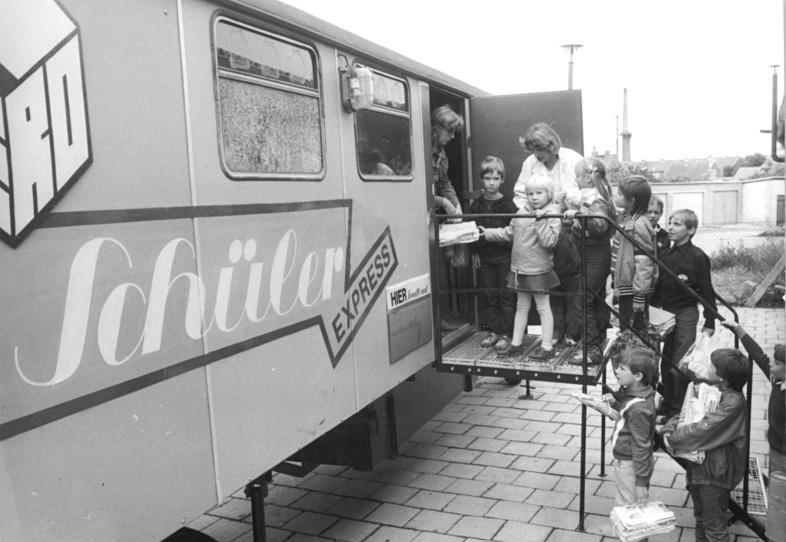
Schoolchildren collect paper for recycling

An Ernst Thälmann Pioneer Organisation session (Pioniernachmittag) was a regular gathering of members of the Ernst Thälmann Pioneer Organisation in the GDR. The session, held on Wednesday afternoons, was arranged by either the class teacher (form tutor) or an adult volunteer for all form pioneers. In 1989, 98% of schoolchildren in the GDR were members of the Ernst Thälmann Pioneer Organisation, making these regular afternoons an integral part of extracurricular school life.

Ernst Thälmann Pioneer Organisation sessions consisted of a mixture of social activities, adventure, and socialist teaching. Social activities and adventures included sports, discos, walks, hand-crafts, celebrations or paper chases. These activities were comparable to that of other youth organisations like the Scouts. More propaganda-like activities were visits of the Soviet Army and police or lectures about the history of Socialism or the October Revolution.

Furthermore, the school achievements (or the lack thereof) of individual pupils were publicly discussed in these sessions. Strong students were assigned to weak students as tutors.

Regularly, afternoons were used to collect waste for recycling from individual households. Pupils walked from door to door and asked for paper, metal, glass bottles and jars, or clothes. The resources were sold and the proceeds were given to charitable causes (like Vietnam or Sandinists) or used for school activities. In 1979/80, pupils collected 73 million jars and bottles of glass, 20,000 tons of metal, 30,000 tons of paper and 9,000 tons of used textiles.

== See also ==
- Ernst Thälmann Pioneer Organisation
