= Anna Louise Grütter =

Swiss teacher and suffragist (1879–1959)

- Born: 17 September 1879; Hindelbank, Bern, Switzerland
- Died: 12 March 1959 (aged 79); Bern, Switzerland
- Occupation: Teacher
- Parents: Karl Grütter (father); Anna Maria Isler (mother)

Anna Louise Grütter (17 September 1879 – 12 March 1959) was a Swiss teacher and women's rights activist in Bern. She taught at the city's girls' secondary school from 1905 to 1942, co-founded the Association of Bernese University Women in 1923 and presided over the Bern women's suffrage association from 1926 to 1941. From 1936 to 1946 she chaired the commission for peace work of the Federation of Swiss Women's Associations.

== Biography ==
Anna Louise Grütter was born on 17 September 1879 in Hindelbank, the daughter of Karl Grütter and Anna Maria Isler, a teacher. She remained unmarried. She trained at the women teachers' seminary (Lehrerinnenseminar) in Hindelbank and studied humanities at the University of Bern, receiving her doctorate in 1915.

From 1905 to 1942 Grütter taught at the municipal girls' secondary school (städtische Mädchensekundarschule) in Bern. In 1923 she co-founded the Association of Bernese University Women (Vereinigung bernischer Akademikerinnen), which she presided over in 1925 and 1926. From 1926 to 1941 she was president of the Bern women's suffrage association (Stimmrechtsverein Bern), and from 1929 to 1958 she sat on the board of the Bernese Women's Federation. In 1928 she headed the publicity department (Propagandaabteilung) of the Swiss Exhibition for Women's Work (SAFFA).

From 1936 to 1946 Grütter chaired the commission for peace work (Kommission für Friedensarbeit) of the Federation of Swiss Women's Associations (Bund Schweizerischer Frauenvereine), and from 1936 to 1955 she sat on the board of the Bern radio cooperative (Radio-Genossenschaft Bern). During World War II she headed the Bernese relief organization for emigrant children. She also worked with the Protestant People's League (Evangelischer Volksbund), the Protestant Women's Federation (Evangelischer Frauenbund) and the Women's International League for Peace and Freedom. In 1952 she initiated the expansion of the course center at Münchenwiler Castle. She died in Bern on 12 March 1959.

== Bibliography ==
- Frauenzeitung Berna, 1959, no. 9
- Der Bund, 15 March 1959

=== Archives ===
- Gosteli Foundation, Worblaufen, biographical collection
