= Pionýr (Czech Republic) =

Czech voluntary association

Pionýr's new logo since 11/2007

Pionýr (- Czech, in English Pioneer) is a Czech-based voluntary, independent, and nonpolitical organization for children, youth, and adults. It focuses on non-formal educational activities organized during leisure time. Pionýr draws partly on the traditions of the historical Pioneer Movement, an international communist children’s organization that was once active in Central and Eastern Europe and still exists in some former Communist countries. The Czech Pionýr is now associated with the International Falcon Movement - Socialist Education International, which promotes social democracy education for children worldwide.

The term "Pionýr" embodies the idea of modern pioneering, reflecting a search for and commitment to socialist learning. Internationally, a pioneer is understood as someone who discovers new paths and champions progressive ideas. Pionýr strives to embody these ideals fully.

In 2007, the organization updated its logo to a new design featuring a swallow emblem, which had been part of its logo since 1990. The new logo also incorporates the Czech tricolour and is arranged in a globe shape.

== Ideals of a Pionýr ==
- Truthful – "A Pionýr protects the truth and keeps their given word."
- Hardworking – "A Pionýr works hard and learns well."
- Friendly – "A Pionýr is a friend of all children."
- Helping – "A Pionýr is brave, comradely, and helpful to others."
- Fair – "A Pionýr is honest and just."
- Nature Friendly – "A Pionýr protects nature and all life on earth."
- Patriotic – "A Pionýr loves their country."

== See also ==
- Pionýr (Czechoslovakia)
