= Ernst Thälmann Pioneer Organisation =

Youth organisation in East Germany

Ernst Thälmann Pioneer Organisation Pionierorganisation Ernst Thälmann
- Emblem of the Ernst Thälmann Pioneer Organisation

- Flag of the Ernst Thälmann Pioneer Organisation
- Founded: 13 December 1948
- Dissolved: August 1990
- Headquarters: East Berlin, German Democratic Republic
- Ideology: Communism; Marxism–Leninism
- National affiliation: Democratic Bloc (1948–1950); National Front (1950–1990)
- International affiliation: WFDY

The Ernst Thälmann Pioneer Organisation (German: Pionierorganisation Ernst Thälmann) was a youth organisation in the German Democratic Republic (East Germany) from 1948 to 1990. It was a subdivision of the Free German Youth (FDJ) for schoolchildren aged 6 to 13 consisting of the Young Pioneers (Jungpioniere) and the Thälmann Pioneers (Thälmann-Pioniere). In the 1960s and 1970s, nearly all schoolchildren in East Germany between ages 6 and 13 were organised into Young Pioneer or Thälmann Pioneer groups, with the organisations having "nearly two million children" collectively by 1975.

The Pioneer Organisation was founded on 13 December 1948 and named for Ernst Thälmann, the former leader of the Communist Party of Germany who was executed at the Buchenwald concentration camp in 1944. It was based on Komsomol and Scouting, being organised to teach socialist ideology to young schoolchildren and prepare them for the FDJ. Pioneer group afternoons mainly consisted of a mixture of adventure, myth-like socialist teachings, and the upkeep of revolutionary traditions. In the summer, children usually went to pioneer camps similar to West Germany's Wandervogel groups or the Scouts, and international pioneer camps were also common, intended to foster friendship between different nationalities. The Pioneer Organisation was dissolved shortly before German reunification in 1990.

== History ==
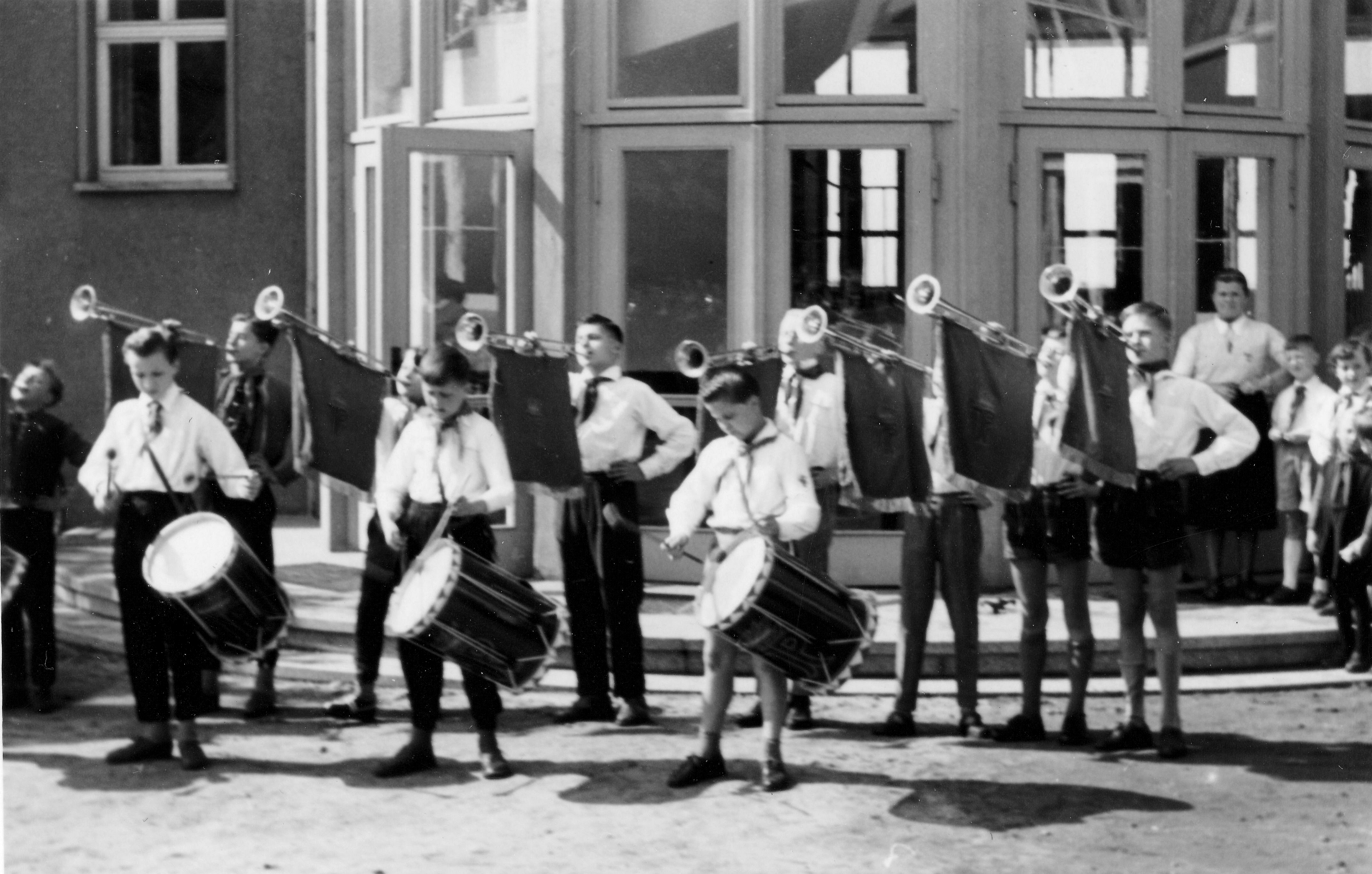
At the school in Biehla, c. 1960

At the 17th congress of the FDJ's central council, the "Young Pioneers" were officially founded on 13 December 1948. It was the common political mass organisation for children in East Germany, run by the Socialist Unity Party of Germany (SED) through the FDJ. From 1949 its chairwoman was Margot Feist, who would later marry Erich Honecker. From 1949 a newspaper was produced called "The Young Pioneer" (Der junge Pionier), later called "The Drum" (Die Trommel).

In 1949 the organisation already counted 714,258 young pioneers, i.e. about 30% of all school-age children in the Soviet zone. By the end of the 1950s the majority of school-age children in East Germany were in the Thälmann pioneer organisation, the range going from 67.4% in Berlin to 89.4% in Dresden. In 1989 there were nearly two million schoolchildren in the organisation, or 98% of all schoolchildren in East Germany.

The pioneers had a general meeting every few years, each time with a different theme.

1. 1952 Dresden, opening meeting, naming of pioneers
2. 1955 Dresden
3. 1958 Halle, Saxony-Anhalt, Für Frieden und Sozialismus (For Peace and Socialism)
4. 1961 Erfurt, Bekenntnis zu ihrem sozialistischen Staat (Vow to the Socialist State)
5. 1964 Chemnitz (then Karl-Marx-Stadt)
6. 1970 Cottbus
7. 1972 Dresden: performance show of the Young Pioneers / Thälmann Pioneers
8. 1988 Chemnitz

In November 1989, there was unrest in the cities of the GDR, such as the Monday demonstrations in Leipzig. The evening before the GDR's 40th anniversary, the traditional parade of torches by the FDJ was accompanied by cries of "Gorbi, Gorbi!" (These events, as well as FDJ and Pioneer songs, are shown in the German language film Good Bye Lenin!). The pioneers' chairman, Wilfried Poßner, who had led the organisation for the last four years, resigned. He was succeeded by Birgit Gappa, who was given the task of reforming the organisation but became its last leader. In August 1990, after the fall of the Berlin Wall and shortly before German reunification, the Ernst Thälmann Pioneer organisation was dissolved. Since then, there have been no pioneer organisations in Germany.

== Slogan and greeting ==
The pioneers' slogan was Für Frieden und Sozialismus seid bereit – Immer bereit ("For peace and socialism be ready – always ready"). This was usually shortened to Seid bereit – immer bereit! "Be ready - always ready!". This was recited at the raising of the flag. One person would say the first part, "Be ready!": this was usually the pioneer leader, the teacher or the head of the local pioneer group. The pioneers all answered "Always ready", stiffening their right hand and placing it against their forehead with the thumb closest and their fingers facing skywards.

== Uniform ==
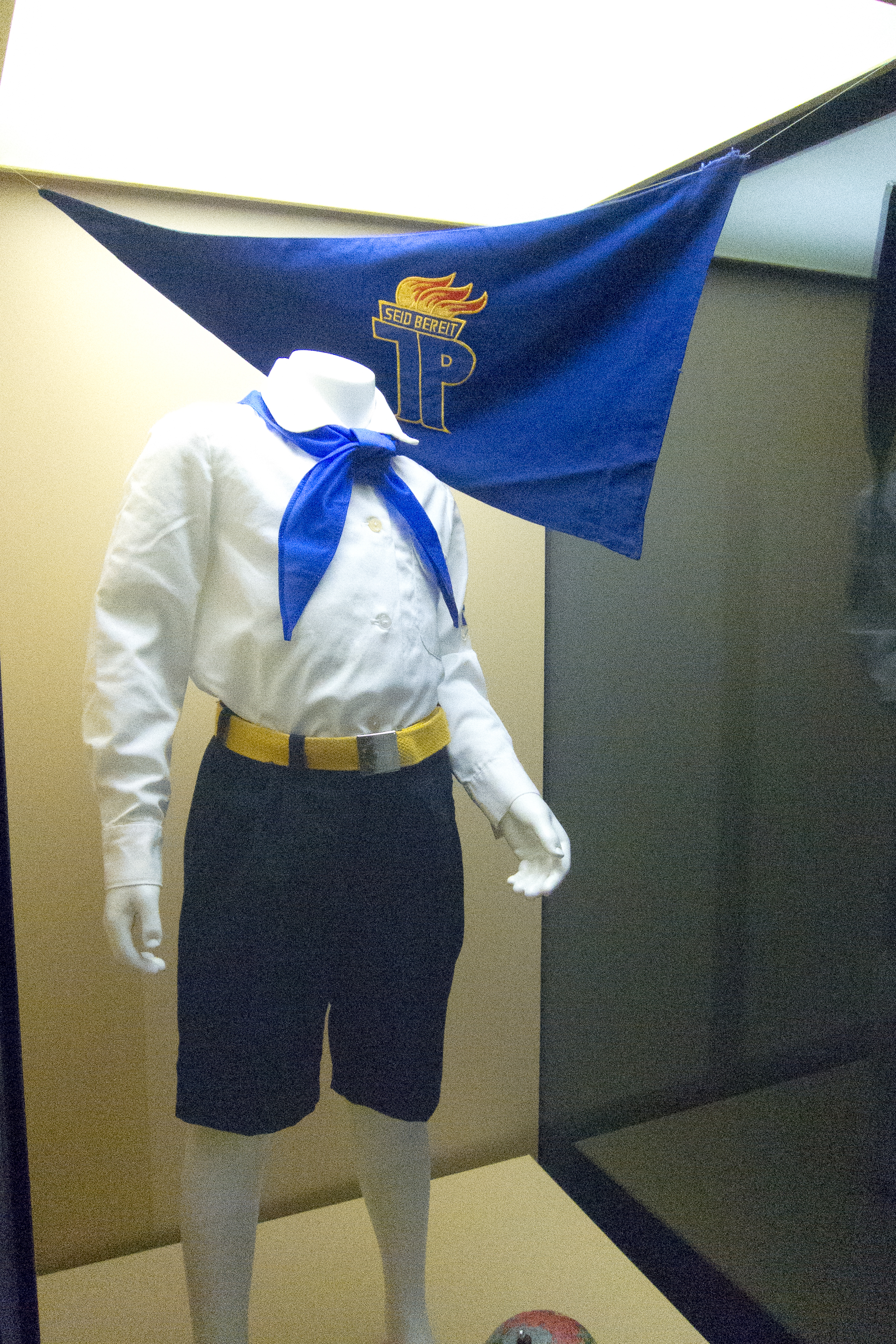
Uniform of the Young Pioneers, worn by both boys and girls

The pioneers' uniform consisted of white shirts and blouses bought by their parents, along with blue trousers or skirts until the 1970s and on special occasions. But often the only thing worn was the most important sign of the future socialist – the triangular necktie. At first this was blue, but from 1973, the Thälmann pioneers wore a red necktie like the pioneers in the Soviet Union, while the Young Pioneers kept the blue one. Pioneers wore their uniforms at political events and state holidays such as the workers' demonstrations on May Day, as well as at school festivals and pioneer events.

== Membership ==
Membership in both the Young Pioneers and the Thälmann Pioneers was voluntary. However, it was seen as a matter of course by the state (and thus the schools) as well as by some parents. Most children simply followed the crowd, and nearly all children in each school class joined, although there were some who did not do so, usually because they were religious or simply did not want to.

Opinions differ as to whether or not it was a disadvantage to refuse to join the organisation. Some people claim that they were shut out of organised events, but others say that they were allowed to take part in anything which interested them. In any case, at least one year's membership of the Young Pioneers was required to be allowed to join the Thälmann Pioneers, and membership in the Thälmann Pioneers was necessary to join the FDJ. Some people who did not join the FDJ later found it hard to follow the university course of their choice, or to travel as freely as others.

Registration as a new member and his or her solemn neckerchief wearing ceremony took place on 13 December, the day the organisation was founded in 1948. Usually, those joining the Young Pioneers were aged 6, and those joining the Thälmann Pioneers aged 10.

== Songs ==
The Pioneer songs were sung at any opportunity, including the following titles:

- Kampflied der Thälmann-Pioniere - Battle song of the Thälmann pioneers
- Wir tragen die Blaue Fahne – We carry the blue flag
- Der kleine Trompeter – Our little trumpeter
- Thälmann-Lied – Thälmann song
- Pioniermarsch – Pioneers' March
- Der Volkspolizist – The People's Policeman
- Jetzt bin ich Junger Pionier – Now I am a Young Pioneer
- Unsere Heimat – Our Heimat
- Die Heimat hat sich schön gemacht – Our Homeland has smartened itself up
- Auf zum Sozialismus – Onwards to Socialism
- Kleine weiße Friedenstaube – Little White Dove of Peace
- Lied der jungen Naturforscher – Song of the Young Nature Researchers
- Wenn Mutti früh zur Arbeit geht – When Mother Goes to Work in the Morning
- Gute Freunde – Good Friends
- Hab'n Se nicht noch Altpapier – Got Any Waste Paper?
- Pioniere voran! – Onwards, Pioneers!
- Laßt Euch grüßen, Pioniere – Greetings, Pioneers
- Immer lebe die Sonne – May There Always Be Sunshine
- Friede auf unserer Erde – Peace on our Earth

== Activities ==
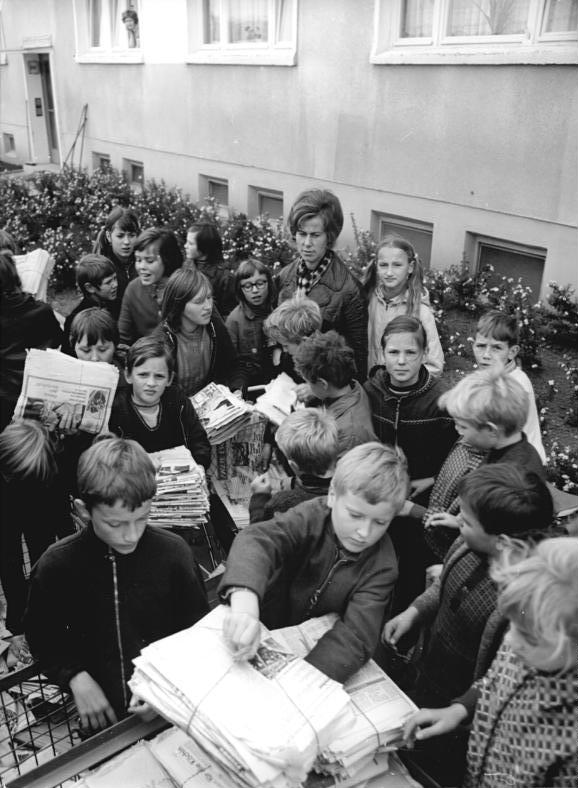
A paper recycling drive in October 1972 to fund the 1973 World Festival of Youth and Students in East Berlin

The pioneers took part in a range of activities including sports, ceremonies and performances, meetings and waste collection for different causes. In their uniforms, and with their children's enthusiasm, they were an attractive accompaniment to GDR anniversaries and festivals. In 1966, for example, a delegation of children from the Pioneers and the FDJ symbolically handed over a bunch of red carnations in honour of the SED's 20th anniversary.

Apart from presenting a youthful, positive face of socialism to the outside world, these activities were also designed to emphasize the message to the children involved that socialism had a strong moral side. In 1971, a "solidarity action" took place in which the children collected a million roses for the release of American citizen Angela Davis. In 1973, the World Festival of Youth and Students in Berlin carried the motto "For anti-imperialistic solidarity, peace and friendship".

Activities were also a way of educating the children in socialist ideals: the "Kurs 80" movement in 1978 aimed at familiarising the pioneers with the politics of the Working Class Party (the SED).

=== Pioneer parks and camps ===
At the first nationwide youth meeting in 1950 at the Wuhlheide in East Berlin, a park was opened known as the Pionierrepublik „Ernst Thälmann“ ("Ernst Thälmann Pioneers' Republic"), later changed to "Pioneers' Park". About 20,000 children stayed there for the meeting. A headquarters for the Young Pioneers was opened in Berlin at the same time.

In 1952 Wilhelm Pieck, then President of East Germany, ceremoniously opened another "pioneers' republic" at Werbellinsee north-east of Berlin. It was based on a Soviet pioneer camp, the Artek. It was considered a privilege to be chosen to go to this camp; every year about 1,000 pioneers were chosen to go there. The site is currently being modernised by an investor from Karlsruhe.

During the summer months, children were sent to the summer pioneer camps in East Germany and other socialist parts of the world, such as that in Dresden in 1952. It was on this occasion that the organisation was given the name "Ernst Thälmann".

In 1979 the Ernst Thälmann Pioneer Palace was opened.

=== International events ===
The elite of the pioneers were often sent abroad, usually to other Socialist or Communist countries, to foster international relations and emphasize the international nature of socialism to the children. In 1967, a Friendship Train travelled to the Soviet Union carrying FDJ and Pioneer members. In 1972 pioneers sent more than a million "messages of friendship" to the Lenin Pioneers in the Soviet Union, who were celebrating their organisation's 50th anniversary.

In 1974, the Salut, Pobyeda action was begun in preparation for the 30th anniversary of the fall of Fascism: the Russian word "Pobyeda" (Победа) means "Victory!". It was the first international pioneer event at which children from Mongolia, North Vietnam and Cuba took part.

=== Collections ===
Young pioneers were also kept occupied by having to collect waste for recycling, such as paper and metal, East Germany being notoriously short on natural resources. For Wilhelm Pieck's 80th birthday, for example, children collected 1.5 million Ostmark worth of waste materials and the money went towards the building of a merchant ship, called the "Thälmann Pioneers". In 1957 stones were collected all across East Germany to build a new jetty at Rostock harbour.

In 1962 the first "Week of Socialist Pioneer Aid" took place, during which the pioneers collected enough recyclable materials to pay for 900 km of the "Friendship Line"(Trasse der Freundschaft) petroleum pipeline.

In 1980, 3,307,585 Ostmark was collected for the children of Cambodia, and in 1983, toys were collected for the children of Nicaragua.

=== Awards ===
One distinction for favoured pioneers was the awarding of medals of all kinds, such as the silver "decoration of merit for the fatherland" (Vaterländischer Verdienstorden) given to the Thälmann pioneers on the occasion of the 10th anniversary of the founding of the GDR in 1959. In 1968 the same award was presented in gold in honour of the 20th anniversary of the founding of the Thälmann pioneers.

Other symbols were also used to give pioneers a feeling of accomplishment or pride, such as the wearing of a red necktie, which was approved officially by the Central Committee of the pioneers in 1973.

== See also ==
- Ernst Thälmann Pioneer Organisation session
- FRÖSI
- Hitler Youth
- Pioneer movement
- Young Pioneer organization of the Soviet Union
- Young Pioneers of China
- Pioneer Organization of the Socialist Youth Union (Czechoslovak equivalent)
