= Pioneer Organization of the Socialist Youth Union =

Pioneer Organization of the Socialist Youth Union PO SSM / PO SZM Czech: Pionýrská organizace Socialistického svazu mládeže Slovak: Pionierska organizácia Socialistického zväzu mládeže
- Emblem
- Founded: 1970 (reorganization)
- Dissolved: 1990
- Headquarters: Prague, Czechoslovak Socialist Republic
- Ideology: Communism; Marxism-Leninism
- Mother party: Communist Party of Czechoslovakia
- National affiliation: National Front of Czechs and Slovaks
- International affiliation: World Federation of Democratic Youth

Pionýr (literally: Pioneer), officially Pioneer Organization of the Socialist Youth Union (Czech: Pionýrská organizace Socialistického svazu mládeže, PO SSM; Slovak: Pionierska organizácia Socialistického zväzu mládeže, PO SZM), was a youth Marxist-Leninist organization in communist Czechoslovakia that was a subdivision of the Socialist Youth Union. Although the organisation proclaimed to be voluntary, every child was expected to join from the age of six.

== Etymology ==
The Czech word pionýr is an approximate synonym of the word skaut (scout). Both are loan words from English and both are connected with the Czech idealization of the Wild West. Therefore, the Pionýr's inspiration from the Scout movement is obvious.

== Activities ==
Pioneer activities were taken from the Scout movement, the Sokol movement, and the Soviet Komsomol and its Vladimir Lenin All-Union Pioneer Organization, with which it was partnered. Original pioneer activities included old paper or herb collecting, described as "voluntary help for Czechoslovak industry". Collecting was a nationwide competition, and the winning pioneer team received a prize and media attention, and a positive reference for their later career. Other common activities including creating poster walls praising the Soviet Union and socialist life in general, or “navázání družby” (“creating a friendship”) with youth from other communist countries. Young pioneers also recited poems in various communist festivals. The most popular activity were the summer camps, which sometimes involved the hosting of youth communist organizations from the whole Eastern Bloc.

The group's activities changed significantly over time. The group was most radical in the 1950s and became more liberal during the 80s due to perestroika.

== Uniform ==
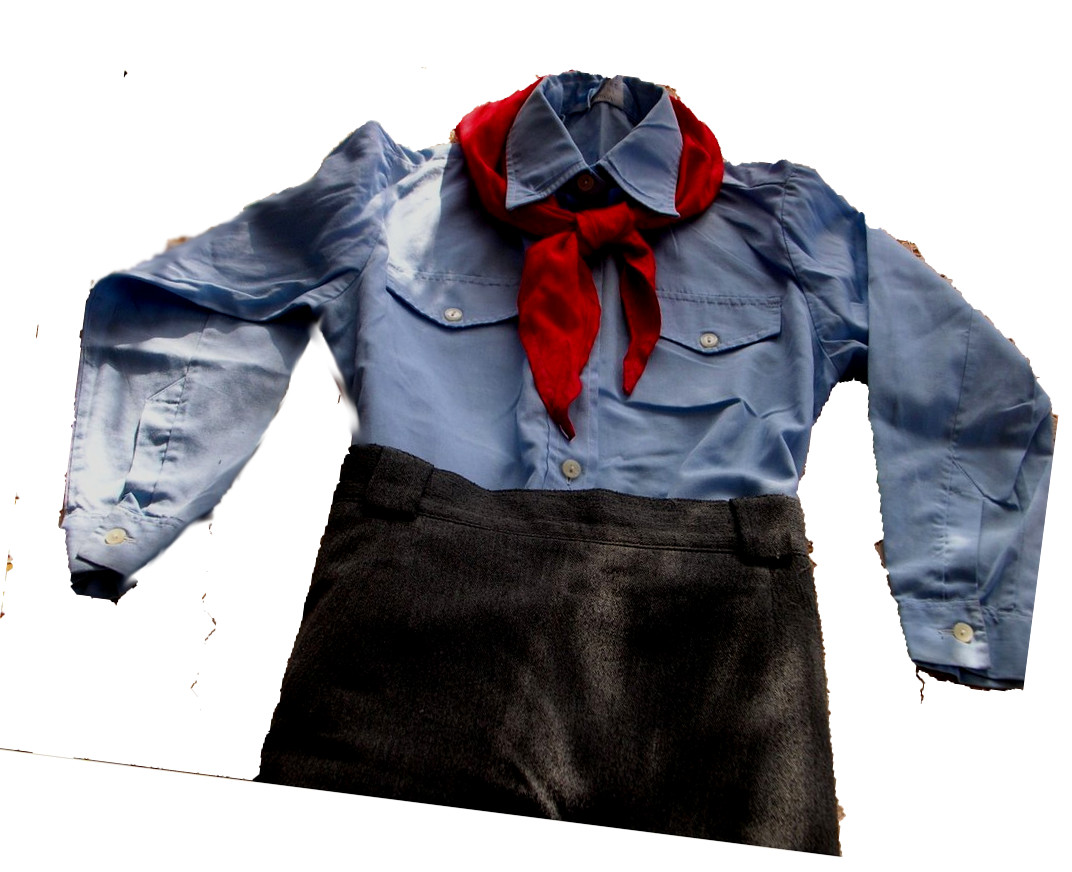
Pionýr uniform

The uniform consisted of a light blue shirt and grey trousers. The female variant used a white shirt and dark blue trousers or skirt. Both sexes wore a red neckerchief.

== Ideology and mission statement ==
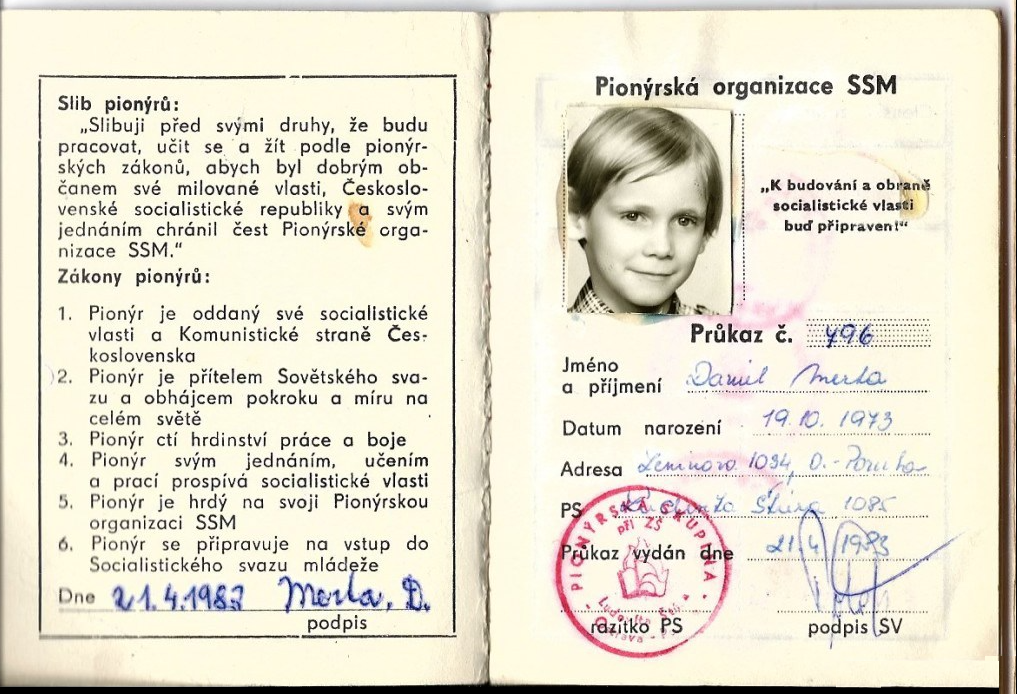
ID card of young member

The PO-SYU Regulation mission statement from 1949 states that a Pioneer:

- Is a role model for other boys and girls.
- Loves his/her people's democratic fatherland. He/She is proud of his/her nation that practices socialism under the presidential leadership of Klement Gottwald.
- Wishes freedom and peace to all nations. Loves the liberator, the Soviet Union, the land of freedom, peace and socialism.
- Learns well. A pioneer is prepared for school well every day, likes books, his/her education never ends. He/she does it to be a conscious and useful builder of socialism.
- Is hardworking. Respects all work that brings profit to the masses and he/she joins it in respect with his personal strengths, primarily helps his/her parents.
- Cares about his/her health. Looks after his/her cleanliness. He/she is tough enough to be a strong worker and defender of the fatherland.
- Is disciplined, Listens to his/her parents, teachers and leaders, is conforming with the will of the collective.
- Defends his/her pioneer honor, Fights for truth, is honorable and responsible. He/she is not selfish and always acts fairly.
- Is young keeper of his/her land. He/She loves nature, respects everything created by the working people and he/she is sparing. He/She protects common property, guards it against pests and enemies.
- Is a loyal serious comrade, helps classmates and is a friend of young children.
- Is preparing for his/her proper admission as part of the ČSM (note: Československý svaz mládeže – literally Czechoslovak Youth Union) in due time. He/She must be always and everywhere a great example of a pioneer to be accepted to the ČSM which unites the best builders of The Republic.

== Motto, Summons and response ==
- Summons: For the building and defense of a socialist nation, be prepared! ( K budování a obraně socialistické vlasti, buď připraven!)
- Response: Always prepared! (Vždy připraven!)

== Post-Communism ==
After the fall of the Communist regime in 1989, there was a debate over the dissolution of Pioneer. The resulting compromise was a complete reform of the movement. This decision was controversial, as Pioneers were a potent symbol of the communist dictatorship. Pioneers nowadays are in fact more liberal than Scouts.

== See also ==
- Pionýr (Czech Republic)
