= Flags of the federal subjects of Russia =

Map of the federal subjects of Russia with their flags

This gallery of flags of federal subjects of Russia shows the flags of the 89 federal subjects of Russia including two regions that, while being de facto under complete Russian control, are not internationally recognized as part of Russia (Republic of Crimea and the city of Sevastopol), and four regions that, while not being fully controlled by Russia or recognised internationally, are claimed by it as its federal subjects (Donetsk and Luhansk republics, Kherson and Zaporizhzhia oblasts).

== Current federal subject flags ==
=== 24 republics ===
Flag of Adygea
(15 July 2007)

Flag of the Altai Republic
(22 March 2016)

Flag of Bashkortostan
(12 February 2003)

Flag of Buryatia
(29 October 1992)

Flag of Chechnya
(22 June 2004)

Flag of Chuvashia
(29 April 1992)

Flag of Crimea*
(4 June 2014)

Flag of Dagestan
(19 November 2003)

Flag of the Donetsk People's Republic*
(4 October 2022)

Flag of Ingushetia
(11 July 1999)

Flag of Kabardino-Balkaria
(21 July 1994)

Flag of Kalmykia
(30 June 1993)

Flag of Karachay-Cherkessia
(26 July 1996)

Flag of Karelia
(16 February 1993)

Flag of Khakassia
(25 September 2003)

Flag of the Komi Republic
(17 December 1997)

Flag of the Luhansk People's Republic*
(4 October 2022)

Flag of Mari El
(1 June 2011)

Flag of Mordovia
(20 May 2008)

Flag of North Ossetia–Alania
(24 November 1994)

Flag of Sakha
(14 October 1992)

Flag of Tatarstan
(29 November 1991)

Flag of Tuva
(8 February 2002)

Flag of Udmurtia
(4 November 1993)

*Disputed

=== 9 krais ===
Flag of Altai Krai
(29 June 2000)

Flag of Kamchatka Krai
(17 February 2010)

Flag of Khabarovsk Krai
(14 July 1994)

Flag of Krasnodar Krai
(23 June 2004)

Flag of Krasnoyarsk Krai
(16 March 2000)

Flag of Perm Krai
(6 May 2003)

Flag of Primorsky Krai
(22 February 1995)

Flag of Stavropol Krai
(15 April 1997)

Flag of Zabaykalsky Krai
(11 February 2009)

=== 48 oblasts ===
Flag of Amur Oblast
(24 April 2008)

Flag of Arkhangelsk Oblast
(23 September 2009)

Flag of Astrakhan Oblast
(19 December 2001)

Flag of Belgorod Oblast
(22 June 2000)

Flag of Bryansk Oblast
(20 November 1998)

Flag of Chelyabinsk Oblast
(27 December 2001)

Flag of Irkutsk Oblast
(16 July 1997)

Flag of Ivanovo Oblast
(19 March 1998)

Flag of Kaliningrad Oblast
(9 June 2006)

Flag of Kaluga Oblast
(30 January 2004)

Flag of Kemerovo Oblast
(10 March 2020)

Flag of Kherson Oblast*
(4 October 2022)

Flag of Kirov Oblast
(30 June 2003)

Flag of Kostroma Oblast
(28 April 2006)

Flag of Kurgan Oblast
(1 December 1997)

Flag of Kursk Oblast
(17 December 1996)

Flag of Leningrad Oblast
(31 December 1997)

Flag of Lipetsk Oblast
(21 July 2003)

Flag of Magadan Oblast
(28 December 2001)

Flag of Moscow Oblast
(9 March 1999)

Flag of Murmansk Oblast
(1 July 2004)

Flag of Nizhny Novgorod Oblast
(11 May 2005)

Flag of Novgorod Oblast
(24 December 2007)

Flag of Novosibirsk Oblast
(25 July 2003)

Flag of Omsk Oblast
(10 June 2003)

Flag of Orenburg Oblast
(17 November 1997)

Flag of Oryol Oblast
(1 August 2002)

Flag of Penza Oblast
(1 June 2022)

Flag of Pskov Oblast
(28 December 2018)

Flag of Rostov Oblast
(28 October 1996)

Flag of Ryazan Oblast
(2 June 2000)

Flag of Sakhalin Oblast
(28 November 1995)

Flag of Samara Oblast
(23 May 2001)

Flag of Saratov Oblast
(5 September 1996)

Flag of Smolensk Oblast
(22 December 1998)

Flag of Sverdlovsk Oblast
(12 April 2005)

Flag of Tambov Oblast
(22 February 2005)

Flag of Tomsk Oblast
(29 May 1997)

Flag of Tula Oblast
(25 November 2005)

Flag of Tver Oblast
(28 November 1996)

Flag of Tyumen Oblast
(25 October 2008)

Flag of Ulyanovsk Oblast
(26 December 2013)

Flag of Vladimir Oblast
(1 July 2017)

Flag of Volgograd Oblast
(18 September 2000)

Flag of Vologda Oblast
(5 December 1997)

Flag of Voronezh Oblast
(5 July 2005)

Flag of Yaroslavl Oblast
(27 February 2001)

Flag of Zaporozhye Oblast*
(4 October 2022)

*Disputed

=== 3 federal cities ===
Flag of Moscow
(1 February 1995)

Flag of Saint Petersburg
(8 June 1992)

Flag of Sevastopol*
(21 April 2000)

*Disputed

=== 1 autonomous oblast ===
Flag of the Jewish Autonomous Oblast
(27 October 1996)

=== 4 autonomous okrugs ===
Flag of Chukotka Autonomous Okrug (28 October 1997)

Flag of Khanty–Mansi Autonomous Okrug
(20 September 1995)

Flag of Nenets
Autonomous Okrug
(25 September 2003)

Flag of Yamalo-Nenets Autonomous Okrug
(28 November 1996)

== Historical federal subject flags ==
=== Former flags of current federal subjects ===
Flag of Adygea
(24 March 1992–15 July 2007)

Flag of the Altai Republic
(2 July 1992–29 June 1994; 24 April 2003–22 March 2016)

Flag of the Altai Republic
(29 June 1994–24 April 2003)

Flag of Amur Oblast
(26 April 1999–24 April 2008)

Flag of Bashkortostan
(25 February 1992–12 February 2003)

Flag of Buryatia
(8 October 1990–29 October 1992)

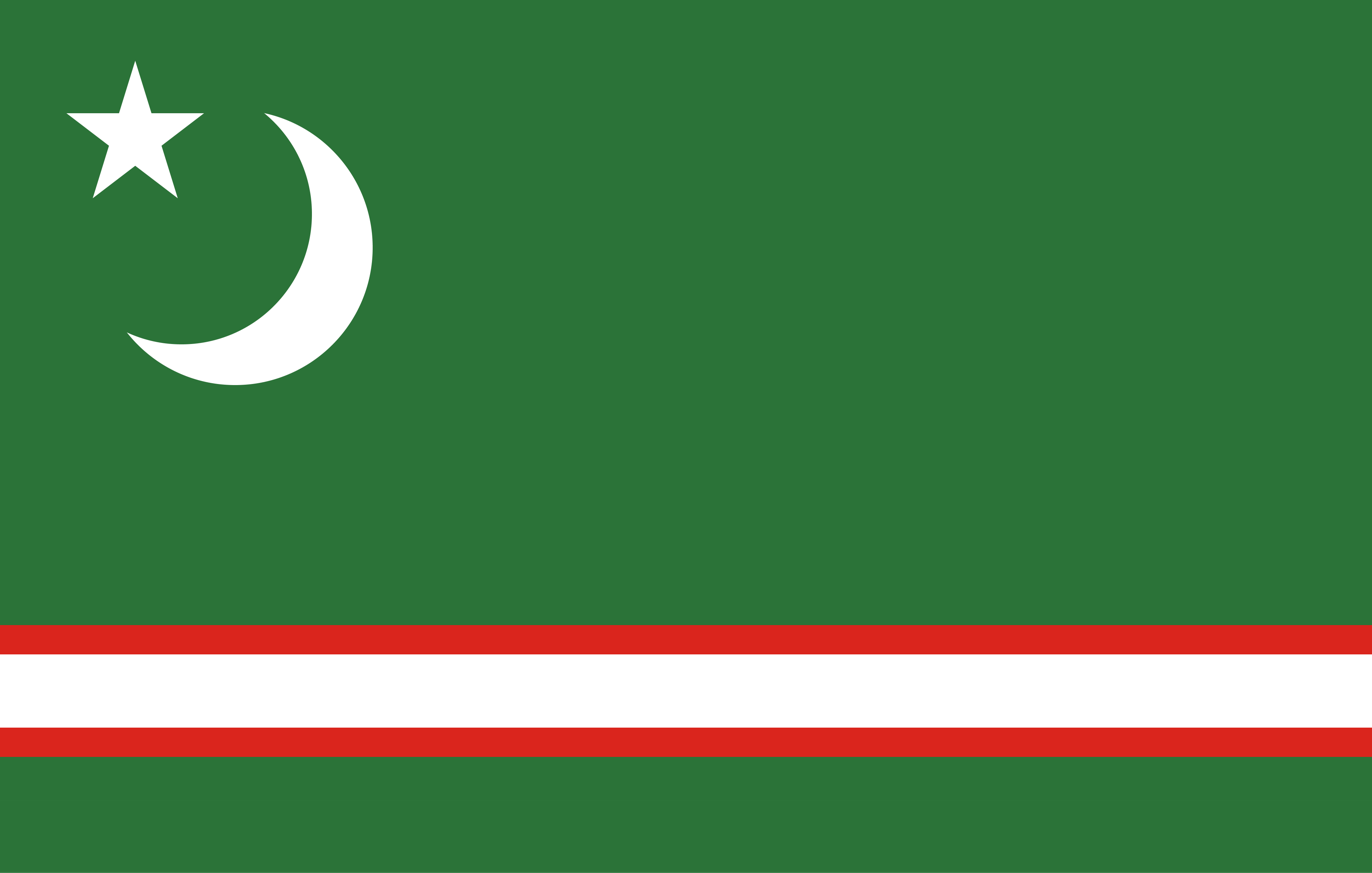
Flag of Chechnya
(de jure; 16 December 1993–23 October 1996)

Flag of Chechnya
(de jure; 23 October 1996–22 June 2004)

Flag of Chukotka
Autunomous Okrug
(28 February 1994–28 October 1997)

Flag of Chuvashia
(24 October 1990–29 April 1992)

Flag of Dagestan
(13 May 1991–26 February 1994)

Flag of Dagestan
(26 February 1994–19 November 2003)

Flag of Ingushetia
(de facto; 4 June 1992–11 December 1993)

Flag of Ingushetia
(de facto; 11 December 1993–13 May 1994)

Flag of Ingushetia
(13 May 1994–11 July 1999)

Flag of Kabardino-Balkaria
(31 January 1991–21 July 1994)

Flag of Kalmykia
(18 October 1990–30 October 1992)

Flag of Kalmykia
(30 October 1992–30 June 1993)

Flag of Karelia
(24 May 1991–16 February 1993)

Flag of Kemerovo Oblast
(7 June 2002–21 February 2003)

Flag of Kemerovo Oblast
(21 February 2003–10 March 2020)

Flag of Khakassia
(6 June 1992–23 December 1993)

Flag of Khakassia
(23 December 1993–25 November 2002)

Flag of Khakassia
(25 November 2002–25 September 2003)

Flag of the Komi Republic
(27 November 1991–17 December 1997)

Flag of Kostroma Oblast
(19 October 2000–20 April 2006)

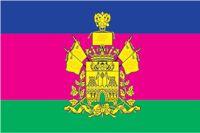
Flag of Krasnodar Krai
(24 March 1995–23 June 2004)

Flag of Mari El
(22 October 1990–3 September 1992)

Flag of Mari El
(3 September 1992–28 November 2006)

Flag of Mari El
(28 November 2006–1 June 2011)

Flag of Mordovia
(7 December 1990–30 March 1995)

Flag of Mordovia
(30 March 1995–20 May 2008)

Flag of Moscow
(29 September 1994–1 February 1995)

Flag of North Ossetia-Alania
(2 October 1991–10 December 1991)

Flag of North Ossetia-Alania
(10 December 1991–24 November 1994)

Flag of Penza Oblast
(18 November 2002–31 May 2022)

Flag of Saint Petersburg
(6 September 1991–13 May 2003)

Flag of Sakha
(27 September 1990–14 October 1992)

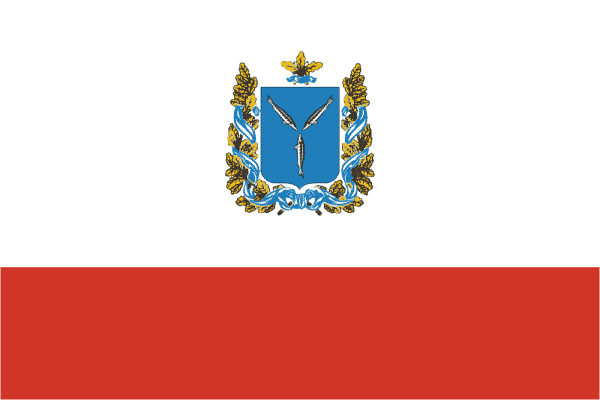
Flag of Saratov Oblast
(5 September 1996–23 May 2001)

Flag of Sverdlovsk Oblast
(11 March 1997–6 May 2005)

Flag of Sverdlovsk Oblast
(version; 11 March 1997–6 May 2005)

Flag of Tuva
(12 December 1990–17 September 1992)

Flag of Tuva
(17 September 1992–8 February 2002)

Flag of Tyumen Oblast
(24 May 1995–25 October 2008)

Flag of Udmurtia
(24 May 1991–4 November 1993)

Flag of Ulyanovsk Oblast
(3 March 2004–26 December 2013)

Flag of Vladimir Oblast
(11 May 1999–1 July 2017)

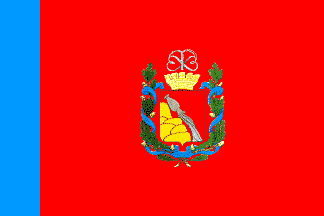
Flag of Voronezh Oblast
(1 July 1997–5 July 2005)

=== Flags of obsolete federal subjects ===
Flag of Agin-Buryat Autonomous Okrug
(29 November 1996–6 July 2001)

Flag of Agin-Buryat Autonomous Okrug
(6 July 2001–17 February 2009)

Flag of Checheno-Ingushetia
(27 November 1990–16 May 1992)

Flag of Checheno-Ingushetia
(de facto; 16 May 1992–9 January 1993)

Flag of Chita Oblast
(22 December 1995–17 February 2009)

Flag of Evenk Autonomous Okrug
(23 March 1995–1 January 2007)

Flag of Kamchatka Oblast
(15 April 2004–1 July 2007)

Flag of Komi-Permyak Autonomous Okrug
(12 February 1996–27 June 1997)

Flag of Komi-Permyak Autonomous Okrug
(27 June 1997–1 December 2005)

Flag of Koryak Autonomous Okrug
(13 July 1998–1 July 2007)

Flag of Perm Oblast
(17 April 2003–1 December 2005)

Flag of Taymyr Autonomous Okrug
(23 June 2000–1 January 2007)

Flag of Ust-Orda Buryat Autonomous Okrug
(27 July 1997–18 September 1997)

Flag of Ust-Orda Buryat Autonomous Okrug
(18 September 1997–1 March 2009)

== See also ==
- Armorial of Russia
- Flag of Russia
- List of Russian flags
- Flags of the Soviet Republics
- List of Sakha flags
