= Georgiyevsk constituency =

Legislative constituency in Russia

Georgiyevsk single-member constituency
- Constituency of the Russian State Duma

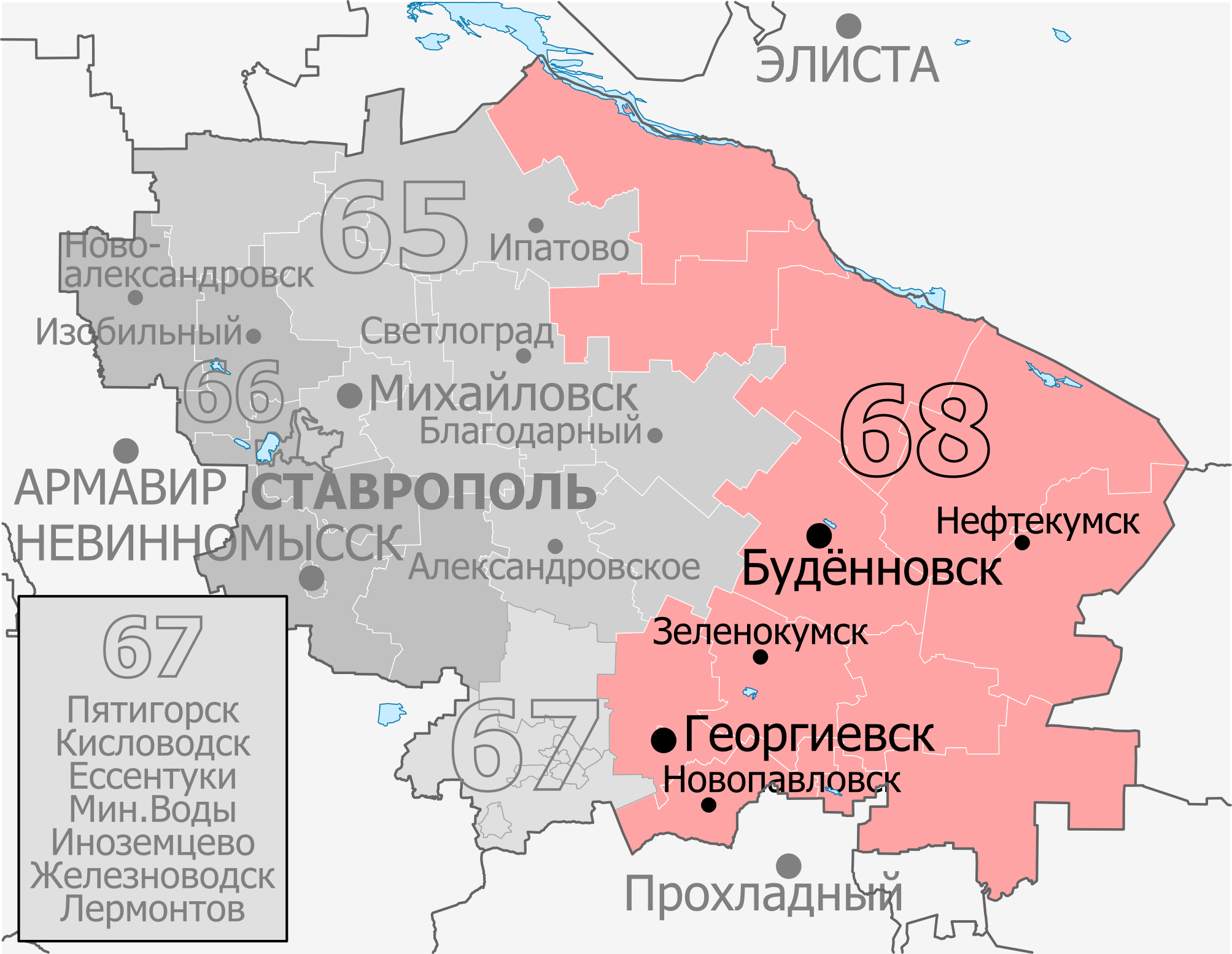
- Constituency boundaries since 2016
- Deputy: Yelena Bondarenko; United Russia
- Federal subject: Stavropol Krai
- Districts: Apanasenkovsky, Arzgirsky, Budyonnovsky, Georgiyevsk, Georgiyevsky, Kirovsky, Kursky, Levokumsky, Neftekumsky, Sovetsky, Stepnovsky, Turkmensky
- Voters: 433,400 (2026)

The Georgiyevsk constituency (No.72 (Note: No.53 in 1993-1995, No.52 in 1995-2003, No.54 in 2003-2007, No.68 in 2016–2026)) is a Russian legislative constituency in Stavropol Krai. The constituency covers northern and eastern Stavropol Krai.

The constituency has been represented since 2016 by United Russia deputy Yelena Bondarenko, Member of Duma of Stavropol Krai and nonprofit executive.

== Boundaries ==
1993–2007: Alexandrovsky District, Budyonnovsk, Budyonnovsky District, Georgiyevsk, Georgiyevsky District, Kirovsky District, Kursky District, Levokumsky District, Neftekumsky District, Novoselitsky District, Sovetsky District, Stepnovsky District
The constituency covered rural eastern and central Stavropol Krai, including the cities of Budyonnovsk and Georgiyevsk.

2016–present: Apanasenkovsky District, Arzgirsky District, Budyonnovsky District, Georgiyevsk, Georgiyevsky District, Kirovsky District, Kursky District, Levokumsky District, Neftekumsky District, Sovetsky District, Stepnovsky District, Turkmensky District
The constituency was re-created for the 2016 election and it retained all of eastern Stavropol Krai, losing its portion of central Stavropol Krai to Stavropol constituency. This seat gained rural northern Stavropol Krai from the dissolved Petrovsky constituency.

== Members elected ==
Election	Member	Party
1993	Viktor Borodin	Independent
1995	Nikolay Manzhosov (Note: died in March 1997)	Communist Party
1997	Ivan Meshcherin	Communist Party
1999	Ivan Meshcherin	Communist Party
2003	Aleksandr Ishchenko	Independent
2007	Proportional representation - no election by constituency	
2011	Proportional representation - no election by constituency	
2016	Yelena Bondarenko	United Russia
2021	Yelena Bondarenko	United Russia
2026	Yelena Bondarenko	United Russia

== Election results ==
=== 1993 ===
Summary of the 12 December 1993 Russian legislative election in the Georgiyevsk constituency
Candidate	Party	Votes	%
Viktor Borodin	Independent	60,193	21.82%
Viktor Savitsky	Independent	55,301	20.04%
Ivan Kostyukov	Agrarian Party	36,517	13.24%
Oleg Arefyev	Independent	31,548	11.43%
Vasily Panchenko	Independent	22,834	8.28%
Anatoly Kubyakin	Independent	16,466	5.97%
against all		31,231	11.32%
Total		275,909	100%

=== 1995 ===
Summary of the 17 December 1995 Russian legislative election in the Georgiyevsk constituency
Candidate	Party	Votes	%
Nikolay Manzhosov	Communist Party	87,967	28.51%
Viktor Savitsky	Independent	44,042	14.28%
Vera Gamzatova	Independent	41,447	13.43%
Viktor Borodin (incumbent)	Independent	24,364	7.90%
Ivan Kostyukov	Agrarian Party	23,982	7.77%
Viktor Novoseltsev	Liberal Democratic Party	23,197	7.52%
Stanislav Pozdnyakov	Independent	18,704	6.06%
Alevtina Lavrikova	Congress of Russian Communities	8,309	2.69%
Mikhail Korobeynikov	Power to the People	7,732	2.51%
Mikhail Zdvizhnikov	Forward, Russia!	3,989	1.29%
against all		18,586	6.02%
Total		308,524	100%

=== 1997 ===
Summary of the 14 September 1997 by-election in the Georgiyevsk constituency
Candidate	Party	Votes	%
Ivan Meshcherin	Communist Party	60,950	42.89%
Nikolay Lyashenko	Independent	19,884	13.99%
Vladimir Bryukhanov	Independent	8,499	5.98%
Oleg Petrovsky	Independent	6,708	4.72%
Stanislav Pozdnyakov	Independent	5,276	3.71%
Mikhail Burlakov	Independent	5,073	3.57%
Vasily Krasulya	Independent	4,341	3.06%
Eduard Limonov (Savenko)	Independent	3,899	2.74%
Ashot Stepanyan	Independent	3,304	2.33%
Andrey Kablov	Independent	2,444	1.72%
Mikhail Orlov	Independent	2,310	1.63%
Viktor Popov	Independent	2,208	1.56%
Aleksandra Neshchadimova	Independent	1,625	1.14%
Natalia Plyushchenko	Independent	1,329	0.94%
Grigory Podgorny	Independent	1,117	0.79%
Mikhail Snezhkov	Independent	815	0.57%
Viktor Taranukha	Independent	419	0.29%
against all		8,353	5.88%
Total		142,091	100%
Registered voters/turnout		458,907	30.96%

=== 1999 ===
Summary of the 19 December 1999 Russian legislative election in the Georgiyevsk constituency
Candidate	Party	Votes	%
Ivan Meshcherin (incumbent)	Communist Party	70,260	25.02%
Valery Ochirov	Independent	42,606	15.17%
Viktor Ponomarenko	Fatherland – All Russia	34,992	12.46%
Oleg Petrovsky	Our Home – Russia	20,947	7.46%
Vasily Belchenko	Congress of Russian Communities-Yury Boldyrev Movement	18,061	6.43%
Olga Kovaleva	Yabloko	12,978	4.62%
Natalya Vishnyakova	Independent	10,589	3.77%
Olga Bazhina	Russian Socialist Party	7,964	2.84%
Igor Steklyannikov	Independent	7,720	2.75%
Leonid Mayorov	Socialist Party	7,616	2.71%
Sergey Vartanov	Liberal Democratic Party	6,641	2.37%
Boris Mullaliyev	Independent	6,432	2.29%
Andrey Toporkov	Party of Pensioners	3,881	1.38%
Andrey Shchelokov	Peace, Labour, May	1,576	0.56%
Vladimir Fedotov	Spiritual Heritage	1,167	0.42%
against all		21,150	7.53%
Total		280,784	100%

=== 2003 ===
Summary of the 7 December 2003 Russian legislative election in the Georgiyevsk constituency
Candidate	Party	Votes	%
Aleksandr Ishchenko	Independent	69,357	29.86%
Yury Vasilyev	United Russia	54,102	23.29%
Ivan Meshcherin (incumbent)	Communist Party	16,318	7.02%
Gennady Aboneyev	Independent	12,119	5.22%
Nikolay Lyashenko	Social Democratic Party	8,614	3.71%
Viktor Gubanov	Independent	8,238	3.55%
Georgy Pryakhin	Party of Russia's Rebirth-Russian Party of Life	6,830	2.94%
Viktor Boroday	Independent	6,733	2.90%
Olga Kovaleva	Yabloko	6,380	2.75%
Viktor Zhukov	Liberal Democratic Party	5,640	2.43%
Nikolay Gubsky	Agrarian Party	5,007	2.16%
Yury Vlasov	People's Party	3,719	1.60%
Sergey Ponomarenko	For a Holy Russia	1,922	0.83%
Aleksandr Pluttsov	Independent	1,611	0.69%
Yury Chuguyevsky	United Russian Party Rus'	889	0.38%
against all		20,216	8.70%
Total		232,452	100%

=== 2016 ===
Summary of the 18 September 2016 Russian legislative election in the Georgiyevsk constituency
Candidate	Party	Votes	%
Yelena Bondarenko	United Russia	113,501	57.75%
Viktor Lozovoy	Communist Party	27,470	13.98%
Aleksandr Chernogorov	Liberal Democratic Party	16,831	8.56%
Yevgeny Bolkhovitin	A Just Russia	10,261	5.22%
Nikolay Lyashenko	Yabloko	5,348	2.72%
Alina Chikatuyeva	Communists of Russia	4,108	2.09%
Georgy Dzasokhov	The Greens	3,250	1.65%
Denis Slinko	Party of Growth	2,940	1.50%
Mikhail Seredenko	Rodina	1,427	1.23%
Total		196,529	100%

=== 2021 ===
Summary of the 17-19 September 2021 Russian legislative election in the Georgiyevsk constituency
Candidate	Party	Votes	%
Yelena Bondarenko (incumbent)	United Russia	128,272	52.76%
Viktor Lozovoy	Communist Party	30,996	12.75%
Tatyana Bikeyeva	Communists of Russia	21,029	8.65%
Dmitry Bazhenov	New People	17,480	7.19%
Aleksey Voytov	A Just Russia — For Truth	13,019	5.35%
Maksim Zaytsev	Liberal Democratic Party	11,606	4.77%
Anatoly Chernov	Party of Pensioners	9,617	3.96%
Total		243,132	100%

=== 2026 ===
Summary of the 18-20 September 2026 Russian legislative election in the Georgiyevsk constituency
Candidate	Party	Votes	%
Yelena Bondarenko (incumbent)	United Russia	208,258	62.85%
Viktor Lozovoy	Communist Party	47,317	14.28%
Dmitry Pastyrev	Liberal Democratic Party	28,368	8.56%
Yekaterina Arzumanova	New People	22,317	6.73%
Nariman Abdullayev	A Just Russia	16,701	5.04%
Maksim Bershak	Yabloko	3,150	0.95%
Total		331,362	100%
