= Flag of Stavropol Krai =

Flag of the Russian krai of Stavropol

Stavropol Krai
- Proportion: 2:3
- Adopted: 15 May 1997
- Design: A white Nordic Cross on a golden background with the coat of arms.
- Designed by: V. Solovyov, T. Solovyov and I. Postnikov

The flag of Stavropol Krai of Russia is a Nordic Cross charged with the krai's coat of arms in its centre. The cross itself is white set on a golden background. In one version, the coat of arms is depicted entirely in gold, in correspondence to the flag's background. In another version, it is in its full array of colours.

The flag was officially adopted by the State Council of Stavropol on 15 May 1997. The proportions are 2:3 according to the second article of the law on the krai's flag.

== Other flags ==
Flag	Date	Use	Description
	2014–present	Flag of Stavropol city	
	1993–2014	Flag of Stavropol city	
	?–1993	Flag of Stavropol city	
	?–present	Flag of Budyonnovsk	
	1998–present	Flag of Georgiyevsk	
	?–1998	Flag of Georgiyevsk	
	?–present	Flag of Kislovodsk	
	?–present	Flag of Lermontov	
	?–present	Flag of Nevinnomyssk	
	?–present	Flag of Pyatigorsk	
	2004–present	Flag of Yessentuki	
	2002–2004	Flag of Yessentuki	
	?–2002	Flag of Yessentuki	
	?–present	Flag of Zheleznovodsk	
	?–present	Flag of Alexandrovsky District	
	2004–present	Flag of Andropovsky District	
	?–2004	Flag of Andropovsky District	
	?–present	Flag of Apanasenkovsky District	
	?–present	Flag of Arzgirsky District	
	?–present	Flag of Blagodarnensky District	
	?–present	Flag of Budyonnovsky District	
	?–present	Flag of Georgiyevsky District	
	?–present	Flag of Grachyovsky District	
	?–present	Flag of Ipatovsky District	
	?–present	Flag of Izobilnensky District	
	?–present	Flag of Kirovsky District	
	?–present	Flag of Kochubeyevsky District	
	?–present	Flag of Krasnogvardeysky District	
	?–present	Flag of Kursky District	
	?–present	Flag of Levokumsky District	
	?–present	Flag of Mineralovodsky District	
	2004–present	Flag of Neftekumsky District	
	?–2004	Flag of Neftekumsky District	
	?–present	Flag of Novoalexandrovsky District	
	?–present	Flag of Novoselitsky District	
	?–present	Flag of Petrovsky District	
	?–present	Flag of Predgorny District	
	?–present	Flag of Shpakovsky District	
	?–present	Flag of Sovetsky District	
	?–present	Flag of Stepnovsky District	
	?–present	Flag of Trunovsky District	
	2013–present	Flag of Turkmensky District	
	2013–2013	Flag of Turkmensky District	
	?–2013	Flag of Turkmensky District	
