= Levokumsky =

Levokumsky (masculine), Levokumskaya (feminine), or Levokumskoye (neuter) may refer to:

- Levokumsky District, a district of Stavropol Krai, Russia
- Levokumskoye, a rural locality (a selo) in Levokumsky District of Stavropol Krai, Russia
