= Krasnoe & Beloe =

Russian retailer

Red&White
- Industry: Retail
- Founded: 2006
- Headquarters: Chelyabinsk, Russia
- Area served: Russia
- Key people: Sergei Studennikov
- Revenue: $3.01 billion (2018)
- Number of employees: 12,000 (2016)
- Website: https://krasnoeibeloe.ru/

Red&White (Russian: Красное&Белое) is a Russian retailer with a network of eponymous self-service shops. The network bills itself as "shopping at home". Although the shops have a wider range of products than liquor stores, their main business is the sale of prepackaged alcoholic beverages. The head office is located in Chelyabinsk. Also, the company has 18 regional offices.

The word "Red" in the name represents wine, and "White" represents vodka.

== History ==
In the early 1990s, Sergei Studennikov founded SPS, a holding company engaged in the distribution of alcohol and tobacco. The first shop called "Red&White" was opened in Kopeysk on 11 August 2006. By the end of the year, the network consisted of 8 stores. in 2007, the chain had expanded to 38 stores. In 2014, the network consisted of 1,700 stores in 27 regions. In July 2015, the network of Red&White included more than 2,500 stores in 39 regions. In 2016, the company had more than 3,000 stores and 4 distribution centers. In 2017, Forbes reported Red&White as having 4,715 stores.

== Activities ==
The retailer operates in the ultra-convenience format (convenience stores with a narrow assortment) and is the largest player in this segment with a market share of 43%. This share is approximately six times greater than that of the second largest representative of the segment.

Due to the large size of the network, the company is a key customer for some manufacturers. As of 2024, the company's network included more than 20,000 stores in 76 regions of Russia and more than 30 warehouses and distribution centers. The "Red&White" chain has become the absolute leader in the number of new store openings in Russia in 2023 and 2024.

All shops are connected to Russia's Unified State Automated Information System (USAIS), an automated system for state control over the volume of production and distribution of ethanol and alcoholic drinks.

In an average trading area of 70 square metres (750 sq ft). The assortment of each store includes more than 1,800 items: food, alcohol, beer and everyday goods.

== Performance indicators ==
In 2015, Red&White took seventh place in the ranking of fastest growing companies in Russia, based on financial results for the period from 2011 to 2014. In 2014, the revenue of the Red&White network amounted to 47 billion rubles (US$1.22 billion), an increase from 10 billion in 2011 (US$0.34 billion), after increasing to 18 billion rubles in 2012 (US$0.58 billion), and then 29 billion rubles in 2013. Forbes estimated revenue for 2015 as 82.5 billion rubles (US$1.35 billion), a year-over-year increase of almost 80%, and named Red&White as the 84th largest private company in Russia. In 2017, Forbes estimated 2016 revenue of 145 billion rubles (US$2.16 billion), listing Red&White as the 51st largest private company in Russia. Revenue increased to 210 billion rubles (US$3.6 billion) for 2017.

Forbes named Studennikov as one of the 200 richest businessmen of Russia in 2015 and 2016 with a net worth of about US$400 million, increasing to $550 million in their 2017 list. In October 2018, Bloomberg estimated Studennikov's net worth at over US$1 billion.

In October 2021, Mercury Retail Holding PLC, the owner of "Red&White", submitted for an IPO at Moscow Exchange. Main stakeholders of “Mercury Retail” are Sergei Studennikov and his family- 49%, Igor Kesaev - 37% and Sergei Katsiev with 8%. 6% are held by minor shareholders. Hereafter, the company declared, that IPO is postponed due to market situation. Meanwhile, on November, 25th, "Mercury Retail" confirmed to be absolutely ready for IPO, still waiting for favourable environment on the market.

As of September 1, 2021, the chain had 9,793 stores in 61 constituent entities of the Russian Federation. According to Infoline estimates, the company's revenue in 2020 grew to 490 billion rubles. As of November 1, 2021, the chain had 10,100 stores in 61 constituent entities of the Russian Federation.

At the end of 2022, the turnover of Mercury Retail Group (manages the "Red&White" and "Bristol" chains) amounted to 993 billion rubles. According to Forbes calculations, the total profit of the subsidiaries of the Mercury Retail Holding group in 2020 was 29.3 billion rubles, in 2021 - 42.3 billion rubles and in 2022 - 55.1 billion rubles. According to Forbes estimates, the net profit of the Mercury Retail Holding group at the end of 2022 exceeded 48 billion rubles. This is higher than the result of the largest retail chains - X5 Group and Magnit. At the same time, the turnover of Mercury Retail Holding is 2.5 times less than that of the leaders of grocery retail. Thus, the company entered the top 5 leaders in terms of turnover and became the most profitable retail company in Russia. Also, "Red&White" took 11th place in the rating of "15 largest employers in Russia". According to the Forbs.ru rating, the total number of employees of the chain reached 141 thousand people.

In 2023, the "Red&White" chain opened more than 3.5 thousand new stores in 76 regions of the country, three warehouses and one office in Novosibirsk. “This has never happened in the history of our country, no company has sold such a number of stores - 4.5 thousand. This is more than 10 stores a day, a phenomenal, fantastic pace. The format and strategy of Mercury Retail Holding turned out to be profitable and successful for scaling and development. The pace of openings also affects the positive dynamics of the companies' revenue - 19.7%," said Ivan Fedyakov, founder and head of the INFOLine group of companies, as part of the online conference "Russian Consumer Market: Key Challenges of 2024".

In the first half of 2023, the share of the top ten FMCG retailers increased from 38.5% to 40.7% in the Food retail sales market. Such data was provided by the INFOLine working group, which completed updating the TOP-200 Largest FMCG Retail Chains of Russia database. Thus, Mercury Retail Holding strengthened its influence by 0.55 percentage points in total, of which 0.49 percentage points were added to the asset by the expansion of the "Red&White" chain, second only to X5 Group. In 2023, the "Red&White" chain took first place in the rating of the information center of modern wine trade Wine Retail in the nomination "Best choice of wine in the formats "Convenience store" and "Discounter"", became "Supermarket of the Year" in the People's Award 59.RU, which was organized and held with the support of the portal 59.RU, the Governor of the Perm Territory and the Perm 300 project office, and also won the annual Retail Week Awards in the nomination "Best practices in the wine category in specialized retail", which was held as part of the VII international forum of business and government "Retail Week".

The products of the "Red&White" chain were noted by domestic and international experts in 2023, included in the Roskachestvo rating of the Wine Guide of Russia-2023, noted in the Wine Enthusiast wine guide and rated by the famous Chilean wine guide DescoRChados.

The company has become one of the leading importers of beer to Russia and entered the top 5 largest wine importers. According to Kommersant, about 44% of beer imports in 2023 were provided by "Red&White", "Bristol" and X5 Group (Pyaterochka, Perekrestok). The "Red&White" chain is annually included in the top 50 largest employers in Russia. According to the Forbes rating, the total number of employees in the chain reached 141 thousand people. The company ranks 11th.

At the end of the first half of 2024, the "Red&White" chain entered the Top 5 in terms of the number of stores in the country, having opened 18,741 stores in 76 regions, and became one of the leaders in terms of the dynamics of growth of retail space. The company also took first place in the rating of the information center of modern wine trade Wine Retail according to Telegram channels in the nomination "Best choice of wine in the Alkostor/Wine Supermarket format".

== Owners ==
The founder is Sergei Studennikov.

At the end of January 2019, "Red&White" merged with Bristol and DIXY chains. Studennikov received 49% of the shares of the combined company.
