= Nezlobnaya =

Nezlobnaya Незлобная
- Stanitsa
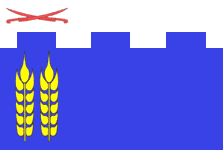
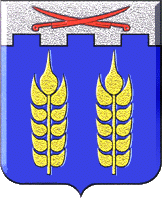
- Flag Coat of arms
- Interactive map of Nezlobnaya
- Location of Nezlobnaya Nezlobnaya (Stavropol Krai)
- Coordinates: 44°07′N 43°23′E
- Country: Russia
- Federal subject: Stavropol Krai
- Administrative district: Georgiyevsky District
- Founded: 1784

Population (2010 Census)
  - Total: 19,746
  - Estimate (2023): 19,000 (−3.8%)
- Time zone: UTC+3 (MSK)
- Postal code: 357807
- OKTMO ID: 07615413101

Nezlobnaya (Russian: Незлобная) is a rural locality (a stanitsa) in Georgiyevsky District of Stavropol Krai, Russia, located 6 kilometers (3.7 mi) from Georgiyevsk, the administrative center of the district. Population: 19,746 (2010 census); 18,087 (2002 census).
