= Suprunov mill office =

Coordinates: 47.2219°N 39.7063°E

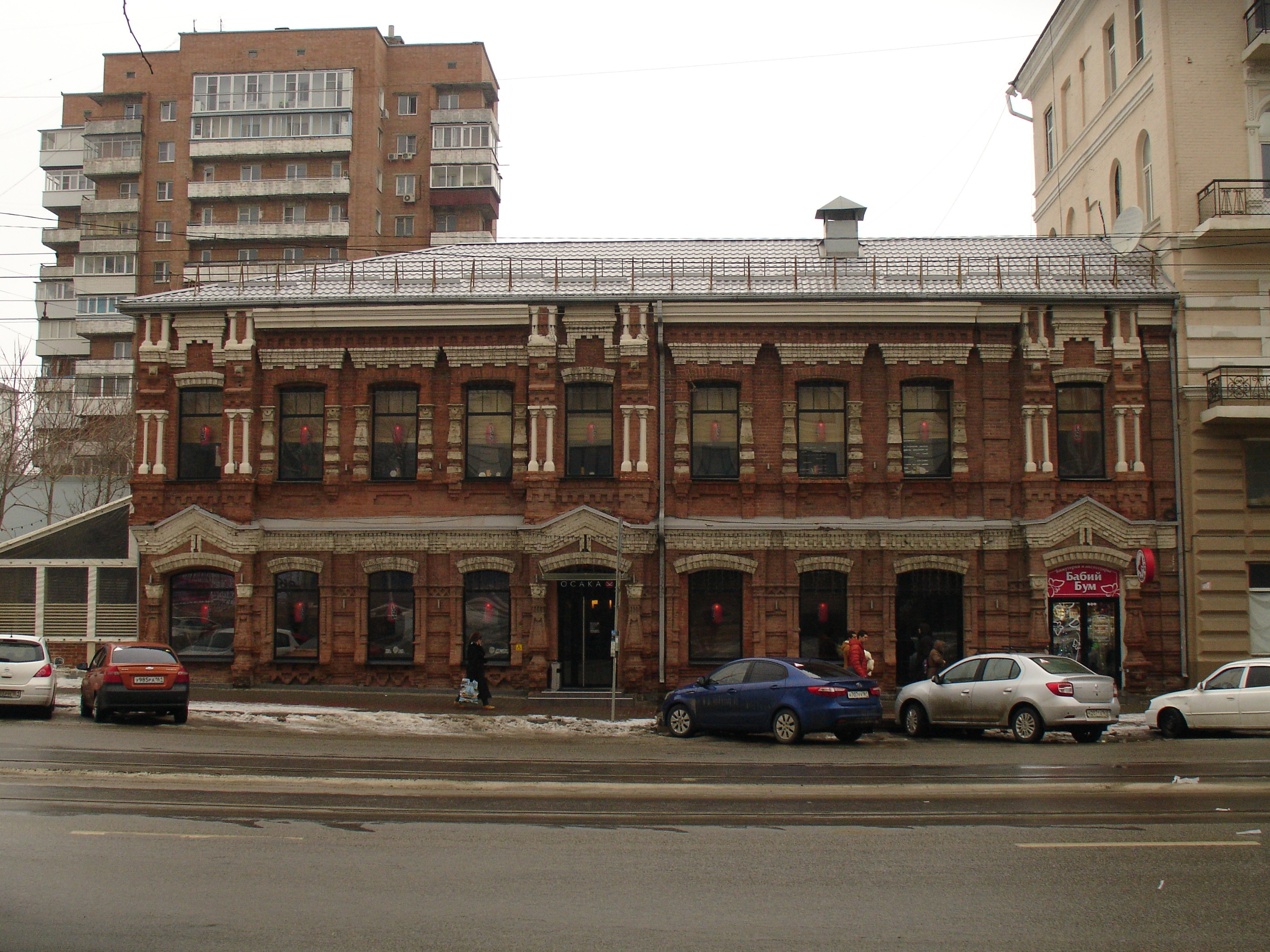
- Former Suprunov mill office in 2019

- Location within Russia
- Type: building
- Location: Rostov-on-Don, Rostov oblast Russia

History
- Built: 1863

Site notes
- Owner: MI Yelitser

The Suprunov mill office is a renovated building on Budennovsky Avenue in the historical part of Rostov-on-Don. The mill's office was built at the end of the 19th century. It is listed as an object of cultural heritage of regional importance.

== History ==
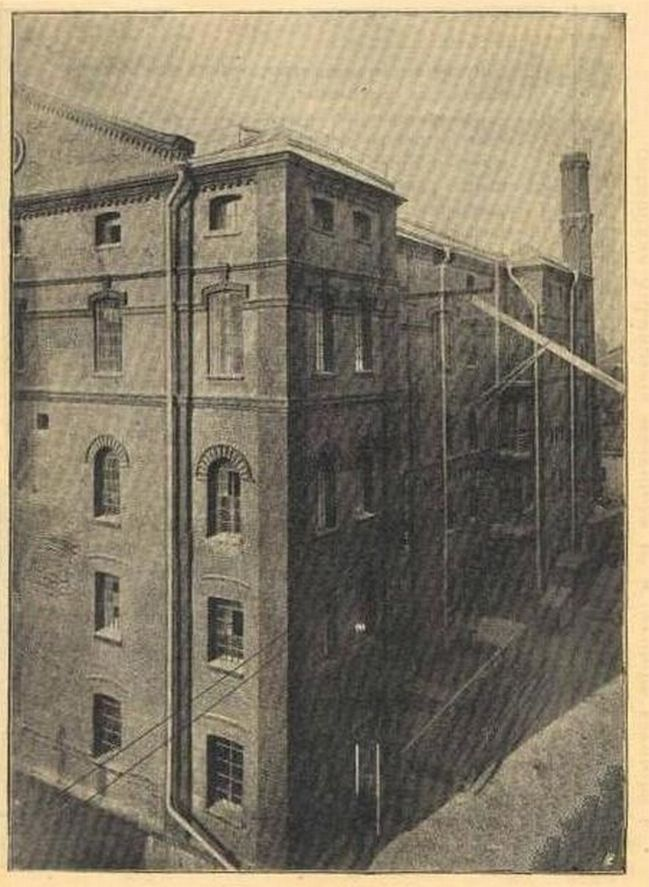
Industrial building of a mill, 1908

In the place where the Suprunov mill was built, in 1863 the overlapping of the prospect by Baykovsky bridge was made. In 1884, many sections of the territory, that adjoined the bridge, were bought by citizens. One of them was MI Yelitser, who purchased a site that adjoined the western side of the avenue. In the 1890s he built a complex of a steam mill, which consisted of an office in two floors and industrial buildings. One more owner of these buildings was the brother of MI Elitser - II Elitser.

In the 1940s mill manufacturing facilities were destroyed, and the roof of the office was significantly damaged. But after the end of the war, repairs made it possible to use the building for housing and shops.

In the 21st century, the facade of the building was restored by Karp Babloyants on his personal initiative, having spent over 3 million rubles for the realization of the idea. For the preservation of the historical appearance of Rostov-on-Don, he received an award - a commemorative medal "185 years to Baykov Andrey Matveyevich".

== Description ==
The house belongs to the number of architectural monuments created in the Russian style.
