= Sergei Studennikov =

Russian businessman

- Born: Sergei Petrovich Studennikov; March 24, 1967 (age 59); Levokumsky, USSR (now Russia)
- Occupation: businessman
- Known for: Founder and owner of discount liquor store chain Red&White

Sergei Petrovich Studennikov (Russian: Сергей Петрович Студенников; born March 24, 1967, Levokumskoye village, Stavropol Krai, RSFSR, USSR) is a Russian businessman and dollar billionaire. Founder and owner of the Red&White. chain of stores. As of 2018, he was ranked 115th in the Forbes ranking of Russia's richest businessmen with a fortune of $950 million. In 2020, he entered the Forbes TOP-100 richest businessmen in Russia with a fortune of $1 billion, taking 97th place, and in 2021 he rose to 78th place with a fortune of $1.8 billion, in 2024 he took 44th place in the ranking with a fortune of $3.2 billion.

== Early life ==
Studennikov was born in the village of Levokumsky, located on the bank of the Kuma River in the north-eastern part of the Stavropol Territory. After the birth of their son, his parents moved to the small town of Bakal in the Satka District in the west of the Chelyabinsk Region. After finishing school, Sergei Studennikov entered the technical specialty at the Mining and Ceramics College in the city of Satka.

After graduating from college, Sergei Studennikov worked in his specialty in the mining industry, then went into the army. After returning from service, he moved to Chelyabinsk. According to the businessman himself, the move was not easy for him. Due to the lack of funds, friends and family ties, he lived at the train station for a couple of weeks in the winter and worked as a loader at the market. He does not like to remember this period. "Since childhood, I dreamed of being a salesman. "My mother would send me to buy groceries every day, and I was jealous: this man at the checkout didn't have to stand in line, while the others stood there for hours," Studennikov said in an interview with RBC magazine in 2019. He does not have a higher education.

== Career ==
Studennikov began his entrepreneurial career in the 1990s with the retail sale of alcoholic beverages, tobacco products, and building materials.

In 2006, Studennikov opened the first "Red&White" liquor store in the city of Kopeysk, which is located ten kilometers from Chelyabinsk. The timing was very good, since the closure of imports in favor of the introduction of EGAIS led to a shortage of alcohol.

In October 2018, the "Red&White" chain had 6,700 stores. In an interview with RBC, founder Sergey Studennikov said the company operated as a convenience-store chain rather than a liquor-store chain, with alcohol accounting for less than a quarter of sales and the remainder coming from food, drinks, tobacco, and everyday goods.

In 2019, with revenue for 2018 of 301 billion rubles, the "Red&White" chain took 46th place in the fifth annual rating of RBC-500. Russia's Largest Companies by Revenue. Revenue growth from year to year amounted to 43% (60th place in the 2018 rating, revenue for 2017 was 210 billion rubles)

In September 2019, the "Red&White" chain had 8,141 stores in 56 regions of Russia[10] and in terms of revenue growth rate over the past five years, it was in third place among 500 Russian companies included in the RBC-500 rating. Largest Russian Companies by Revenue.

In 2019, Sergey Studennikov, together with Igor Kesaev (owner of the Dixy Group of Companies and co-owner of the Bristol retail chain) and Sergey Katsiev (co-owner of the Bristol retail chain), decided to merge the retail chains into a single retailer.

In September 2019, shareholders of the retail chains of the Dixy group of companies (the Dixy and Victoria stores and the Ural Megamart chain), "Red&White" and Bristol completed the merger of their retail businesses, creating the holding company DKBR Mega Retail Group Limited[12], which was subsequently renamed Mercury Retail Group Limited. Under the terms of the merger, the founder of the "Red&White" retail chain, Sergei Studennikov, owns 49%, and the owners of Dixy and Bristol, Igor Kesaev and Sergei Katsiev, own 51%.[13] The merger of the three retailers significantly changed the balance of power in food retail. The group of companies took third place among the largest retailers in Russia according to Forbes, became the third largest retailer based on the results of the first half of 2021 in the Kommersant Publishing House rating, entered the rating of "200 Largest Private Companies in Russia - 2021" according to Forbes, taking 13th place, became the third largest private employer in Russia and the third company in Russia in terms of revenue in the trade sector according to RBC in the rating "RBC-500. Largest Companies in Russia by Revenue".

In 2021, Mercury Retail Group partners agreed on a deal with Magnit, selling 2,458 Dixie stores and 39 Megamarts.

According to Sergei Studennikov, this deal will not affect the work of the "Red&White" chain in any way, and the shares of Mercury Retail Group Limited shareholders will remain in the same proportion. "The partners of Mercury Retail Group Limited decided to focus on the development of the "Red&White" and Bristol chains in order to strengthen their position in the market," Studennikov said.

As of the end of 2021, the "Red&White" chain has 10,325 stores in 61 regions of Russia. At the end of 2022, the number of stores in the chain reached 13,000 in 72 regions of the country.

In 2023, Sergey Studennikov and partners who own the Cypriot holding Mercury Retail Group Limited created the holding Mercury Retail Holding in the Russian jurisdiction. The shareholder structure is the same as that of the Cypriot organization: 45% belongs to Sergey Studennikov, 4% to a member of his family, 37.25% to Igor Kesaev, 7.69% to Sergey Katsiev. At the end of 2022, the turnover of Mercury Retail Group (manages the "Red&White" and Bristol chains) amounted to 993 billion rubles.

According to Forbes calculations, the total profit of the subsidiaries of the Mercury Retail Holding group in 2020 was 29.3 billion rubles, in 2021 - 42.3 billion rubles, and in 2022 - 55.1 billion rubles. According to Forbes estimates, the net profit of the Mercury Retail Holding group at the end of 2022 exceeded 48 billion rubles. This is higher than the result of the largest retail chains - X5 Group and Magnit. At the same time, the turnover of Mercury Retail Holding is 2.5 times less than that of the leaders of grocery retail. Thus, the company entered the top 5 leaders in turnover and became the most profitable retail company in Russia. Also, "Red&White" took 11th place in the rating of "15 Largest Employers in Russia". According to the Forbes.ru rating, the total number of employees in the network reached 141 thousand people.

In 2023, the "Red&White" retail chain opened more than 3,500 stores across 76 regions of Russia, along with three distribution warehouses and an office in Novosibirsk. According to Ivan Fedyakov, founder of the INFOLine group, this represented a significant expansion of the chain's retail network. He stated during the online conference "Russian Consumer Market: Key Challenges of 2024" that approximately 4,500 stores had been opened in total and that the rate of expansion exceeded 10 stores per day. Fedyakov also noted that the expansion strategy of Mercury Retail Holding contributed to the company's growth, including a reported revenue increase of 19.7 percent.

In the first half of 2023, the share of the ten leading FMCG retailers increased from 38.5% to 40.7% in the Food retail market. These data were provided by the INFOLine working group, which completed updating the TOP-200 Largest FMCG Retail Chains of Russia database. Thus, Mercury Retail Holding strengthened its influence by 0.55 p.p. in total, of which 0.49 p.p. was contributed by the expansion of the "Red&White" chain, second only to X5 Group.

The company has become one of the leading beer importers to Russia and entered the top 5 largest wine importers. According to Kommersant, about 44% of beer imports in 2023 were provided by "Red&White", Bristol and X5 Group (Pyaterochka, Perekrestok).

The "Red&White" chain is annually included in the Top 50 largest employers in Russia. According to the Forbes rating, the total number of employees in the chain reached 141 thousand people. The company ranks 11th.

The products of the "Red&White" chain were noted by domestic and international experts in 2023, were included in the Roskachestvo rating "Wine Guide of Russia-2023", were noted in the Wine Enthusiast wine guide and rated by the famous Chilean wine guide DescoRChados.

At the end of the first half of 2024, the "Red&White" chain entered the Top 5 in terms of the number of stores in the country, having opened 18,741 stores in 76 regions, and became one of the leaders in terms of the dynamics of growth of retail space. The company also took first place in the rating of the information center for modern wine trade Wine Retail according to Telegram channels in the nomination "Best choice of wine in the Alkostor/Wine Supermarket format".

== Financial status ==
According to Forbes, Sergey Studennikov's net worth was $450 million in 2015, $400 million in 2016, $550 million in 2017, $850 million in 2019, $1 billion in 2020, and $1.8 billion in 2021.

In October 2018, Bloomberg estimated Studennikov's net worth at over $1 billion.[6] He is a citizen of Montenegro

He was included in the Forbes magazine rating of "200 Richest Businessmen of Russia 2021", where he took 78th place with a net worth of $1.8 billion.

In 2023, he was included in the rating of "110 Russian Billionaires. Forbes Rating - 2023" according to Forbes estimates.

According to Forbes, in 2024, the 57-year-old businessman's fortune grew by 113%, to $3.2 billion. Sergei Studennikov became the only billionaire in Russia whose fortune more than doubled. He was included in the annual ranking of the world's richest businessmen according to Forbes. That same year, Studennikov's wife Elena Soboleva was among the top ten richest self-made women in Russia, with her fortune estimated at $250 million.

Based on the results of 2024, Studennikov entered the Top 125 billionaires of Russia, taking 44th place.

== Personal life ==
He is married to Elena Soboleva, they have two daughters.

On September 21, 2022 Studennikov and his wife received the citizenship of Montenegro.
