= Komi-Permyak =

Komi-Permyak may refer to:

- Komi-Permyak Okrug, a territory with special status within Perm Krai, Russia
- Komi-Permyak language, a language spoken in Komi-Permyak Okrug, Russia
