= Flag of Perm Krai =

Perm Krai
- Proportion: 2:3
- Adopted: 6 May 2003
- Design: A red and blue rectangular panels divided by a white cross with the coat of arms in the centre

The flag of Perm Krai in Russia is a rectangular panel divided by a white cross, which is the St. George's Cross of the patron of Russia, charged with the coat of arms of the krai in the centre. The corners of the panel are divided into two colours: red at the top-left and bottom-right, and blue at the top-right and bottom-left. The flag was, until 2004, the flag of the Perm Oblast, which was merged with Komi-Permyak Autonomous Okrug to form Perm Krai.

The white symbolizes peace, virtue, and cleanliness of the thoughts of the Permian people. The blue symbolizes heat, beauty, and softness of human attitudes as well as the numerous lakes and rivers, riches of water resources, and the extensive bodies of water in the blast. The red symbolizes the courage, bravery, and fearlessness of the Permians. Altogether, they reflect the national colours of the Russian Federation.

The flag was adopted on 6 May 2003 and the proportions are 2:3. Its design is similar to the flag of the Dominican Republic.

== Other flags ==
Flag	Date	Use	Description
	1998–present	Flag of Perm city	A bear carrying a book beneath a cross on an all red background.
	1998–present	Flag of Zvyozdny	
	?–1998	Flag of Zvyozdny	
	2011–present	Flag of Berezniki	
	2011–present	Flag of Gremyachinsk	
	2006–present	Flag of Dobryanka	
	1998–2006	Flag of Dobryanka	
	2005–present	Flag of Kizel	
	2008–present	Flag of Krasnokamsk	
	2003–2008	Flag of Krasnokamsk	
	?–2003	Flag of Krasnokamsk	
	2009–present	Flag of Kungur	
	2009–present	Flag of Solikamsk	
	2010–present	Flag of Chaykovsky	
	2007–present	Flag of Chusovoy	
	?–2007	Flag of Chusovoy	
	2010–present	Flag of Kudymkar	
	?–present	Flag of Bardymsky District	
	2002–present	Flag of Beryozovsky District	
	?–2002	Flag of Beryozovsky District	
	?–present	Flag of Bolshesosnovsky District	
	?–present	Flag of Vereshchaginsky District	
	?–present	Flag of Gaynsky District	
	2008–present	Flag of Gornozavodsky District	
	?–present	Flag of Kosinsky District	
	?–present	Flag of Yelovsky District	
	?–present	Flag of Kochyovsky District	
	2008–present	Flag of Ilyinsky District	
	?–2008	Flag of Ilyinsky District	
	2010–present	Flag of Kudymkarsky District	
	2004–present	Flag of Karagaysky District	
	?–2004	Flag of Karagaysky District	
	?–present	Flag of Kishertsky District	
	?–present	Flag of Yurlinsky District	
	?–present	Flag of Krasnovishersky District	
	?–present	Flag of Yusvinsky District	
	?–present	Flag of Kuyedinsky District	
	2008–present	Flag of Kungursky District	
	?–2008	Flag of Kungursky District	
	?–present	Flag of Nytvensky District	
	?–present	Flag of Oktyabrsky District	
	2004–present	Flag of Ordinsky District	
	?–2004	Flag of Ordinsky District	
	?–present	Flag of Osinsky District	
	?–present	Flag of Okhansky District	
	?–present	Flag of Ochyorsky District	
	2008–present	Flag of Permsky District	
	?–present	Flag of Sivinsky District	
	?–present	Flag of Solikamsky District	
	?–present	Flag of Suksunsky District	
	?–present	Flag of Uinsky District	
	?–present	Flag of Usolsky District	
	?–present	Flag of Chastinsky District	
	2009–present	Flag of Cherdynsky District	
	?–2009	Flag of Cherdynsky District	
	2009–present	Flag of Chernushinsky District	
	?–2009	Flag of Chernushinsky District	
	2007–present	Flag of the Komi-Permyak Okrug	
	1997–2007	Flag of the Komi-Permyak Autonomous Okrug	
	2003–2005	Flag of Perm Oblast	
