= Spanish fess =

Wide central horizontal stripe on a flag

The banner of Spain, with a central stripe larger than the outer stripes.

In heraldry and vexillology, a Spanish fess is a term occasionally used to describe the central horizontal stripe of a tricolour or triband flag that is twice the width of the stripes on either side of it.

The name is based on the most well-known example of this style of flag, the flag of Spain, and in analogy to the equivalent term for vertically striped flags, the Canadian pale. Flags of the World's Dictionary of Vexillology does not include the term but uses instead 'Spanish-style triband' and 'Unequal triband', the latter term not distinguishing between vertical and horizontal partitions of the field.

== Looser definition ==
As with the Canadian pale, a looser definition of Spanish fess also exists, in which the central stripe is considerably larger than, but not necessarily twice the width of the two outer stripes.

== Flag gallery ==
=== 1:2:1 proportions ===
==== National ====
Flag of Cambodia

Flag of Laos

Flag of Lebanon

Flag of Libya

Flag and imperial standard of Vietnam under late-Nguyễn dynasty (1941-1945)

==== Subnational ====
Flag of Central Bosnia Canton, Bosnia and Herzegovina

Flag of Zenica-Doboj Canton, Bosnia and Herzegovina

Flag of French Polynesia

Flag of the Kuyavian–Pomeranian Voivodeship, Poland

Flag of Krasnodar Krai, Russia

Flag of Mordovia, Russia

Flag of Ryazan Oblast, Russia

Flag of Hesse, Germany (former, 1806-1945)

Flag of Kalmykia, Russia (former, 1992–1993)

Flag of Mari El, Russia (former, 1992–2006)

==== Municipal ====
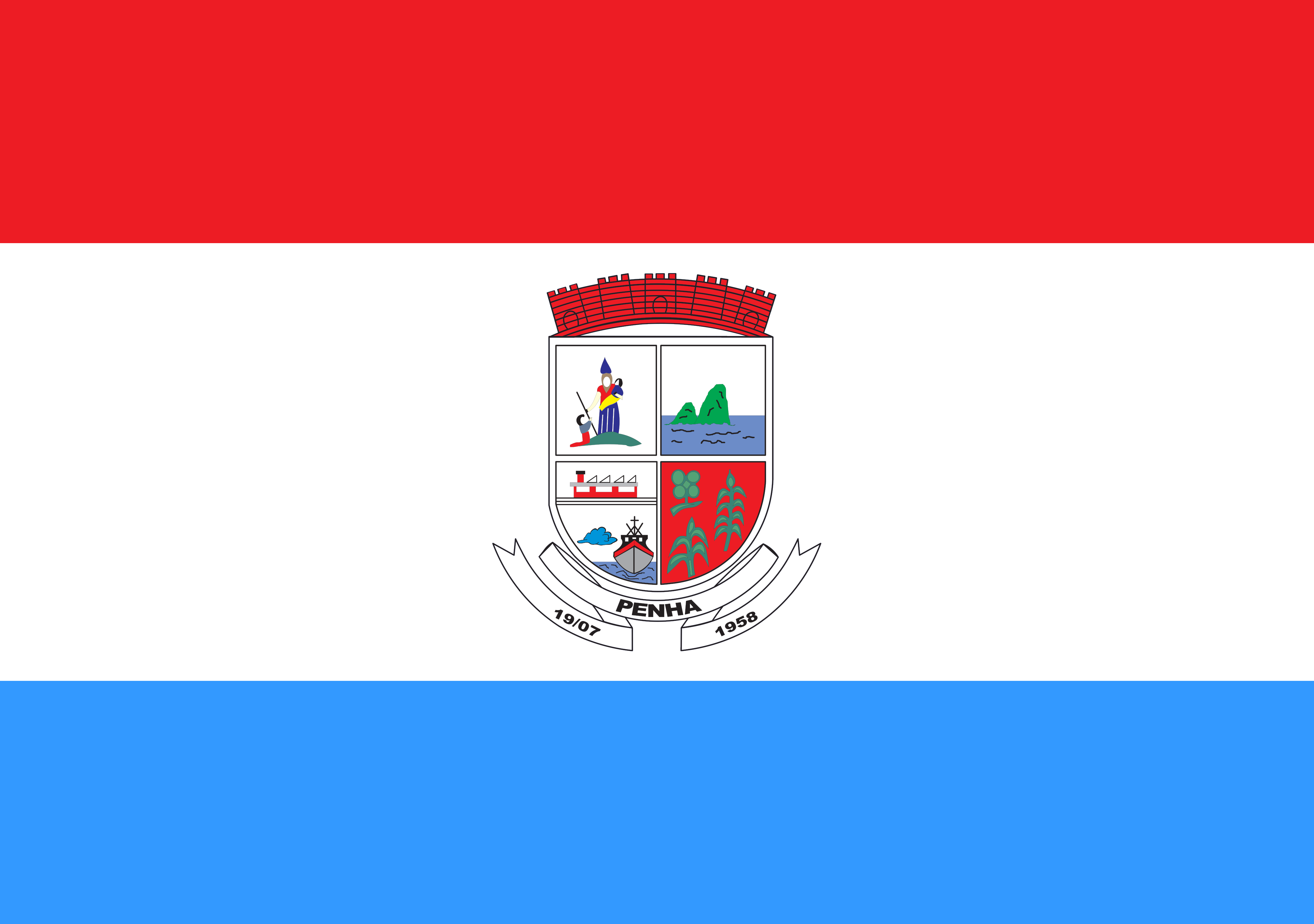
Flag of Penha, Santa Catarina, Brazil

Flag of Debrecen, Hungary (ceremonial)

Flag of Asunción, Paraguay

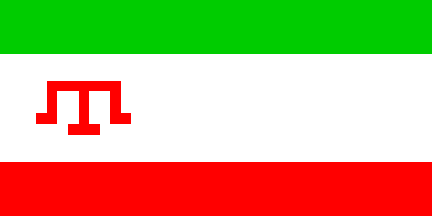
Flag of the former Taraclia County, Moldova

=== Other proportions ===
==== National ====
Flag of Belize

Flag of Eswatini

Flag of Lesotho

Flag of Mauritania

Flag of North Korea

Flag of Suriname

Flag of Tajikistan

Flag of Tuvalu (former,1996–1997)

==== Subnational ====
Flag of Mecklenburg-Western Pomerania, Germany

Flag of Ehime Prefecture, Japan

Flag of Evenk Autonomous Okrug, Russia

Flag of Ingushetia, Russia

Flag of Mari El, Russia (2006–2011)

Flag of Vojvodina, Serbia

Flag of Crimea, Ukraine

Flag of Prussia, Germany (1892-1918)

==== Municipal ====
Flag of Antwerp, Belgium

Flag of Lika-Senj County, Croatia

Flag of Berlin, Germany

Flag of Eisenach, Germany

Flag of Sankt Peter-Ording, Germany

Flag of Almaty, Kazakhstan

Flag of Guadalajara, Mexico

Flag of Elburg, Gelderland, Netherlands

Flag of New Orleans, Louisiana, United States

Flag of Erie, Pennsylvania, United States

==== Other ====
Proposed flag of Canada by Kazuo Nakamura (1963)

Alpha 66's Proposed flag of Free Cuba

Proposed flag of Cyprus

Proposed Flag of Guadeloupe (UPLG)

Flag of the Maharashtra Navnirman Sena

== See also ==
- The flag of Colombia, with a ratio of 2:1:1, instead of 1:2:1
- The flag of Ecuador, with a ratio of 2:1:1, instead of 1:2:1
- The bisexual pride flag, with a ratio of 2:1:2, instead of 1:2:1
- Fess (heraldry)
- Bar (heraldry)
