= Yelena Bondarenko (Russian politician) =

Russian politician

- Елена Бондаренко
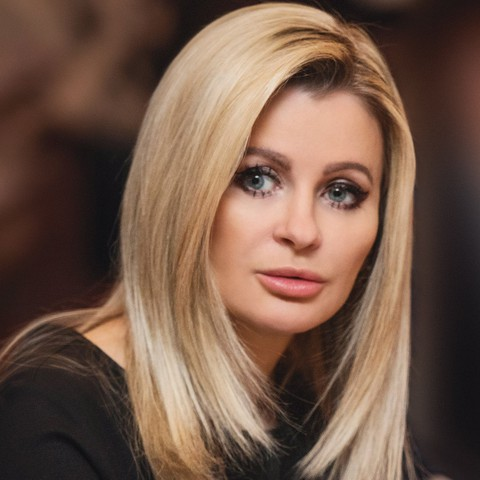

Member of the State Duma for Stavropol Krai
- Incumbent
- Assumed office 5 October 2016
- Preceded by: constituency re-established
- Constituency: Georgiyevsk (No. 68)

Personal details
- Born: 10 June 1968 (age 58) Svetlograd, RSFSR, USSR
- Party: United Russia
- Spouse: Sergei Bondarenko (died 2016)
- Children: 2
- Education: Stavropol State University; RANEPA
- Occupation: social service worker teacher

Yelena Veniaminovna Bondarenko (Russian: Елена Вениаминовна Бондаренко; born 10 June 1968) is a Russian politician for the United Russia party. She was born in Svetlograd, and represents Georgiyevsk in the State Duma.

== Biography ==
Yelena Veniaminovna Bondarenko graduated from the Stavropol Pedagogical Institute with a degree in History and Social Studies Education.

After graduation, she worked as a school teacher.

From 2000 to 2007, she was involved in public and social activities, heading several non-profit public organizations.

Since 2000, she served as the director of the Dmitry Kuzmin Charitable Public Foundation (the foundation was established by former mayor of Stavropol, Dmitry Kuzmin, who in 2007 became a defendant in criminal cases on charges of abuse of power and tax evasion; he is currently in hiding abroad).

On March 1, 2007, she was elected to the IV Convocation of the State Duma of Stavropol Krai through the single electoral district as a member of the political party A Just Russia: Motherland / Pensioners / Life. She chaired the Committee on Mass Communications, Information Technology, and Communications, was a member of the Committee on Social Policy, and was part of the A Just Russia faction.

In 2009, she graduated with honors from the Russian Academy of Public Administration under the President of the Russian Federation with a specialization in Public Relations.

On December 4, 2011, she was re-elected to the V Convocation of the State Duma of Stavropol Krai via Alexandrovsky single-member district No. 1, running as a candidate from United Russia. She joined the party’s parliamentary faction and chaired the Committee on Culture, Youth Policy, Physical Culture, and Mass Media.

In 2012, she defended her dissertation at Stavropol State University on the topic “Manifestation of the Region’s Image Through the Mass Media”, earning a Candidate of Sociological Sciences degree (equivalent to a PhD).

In 2013, she was elected Chair of the Olympic Council of Stavropol Krai. She became a member of the Expert Council on Economic Policy and Cooperation between Russia, the EurAsEC, and the WTO in the Agro-Industrial Sector under the State Duma Committee on Economic Policy, Innovative Development, and Entrepreneurship, as well as a member of the Council on Youth Policy under the Presidential Envoy to the North Caucasian Federal District.

She was a member of the Organizing Committee of the North Caucasus Youth Forum “Mashuk”, the Stavropol Regional Women's Council, and the Coordinating Council for the Development of Small and Medium Enterprises in Stavropol Krai. She also participated in the Heraldic Commission, the Council on Informatization and Information Security, and the regional organizing committee “Victory”. Additionally, she was part of the working group for the “Buy Stavropol” project and the working group on the implementation of the “Open Government” system.

In July 2016, the media reported the murder of her husband, Sergei Bondarenko, who served as Deputy Head of the FSB Department for Stavropol Krai.

In 2016, she placed first (77.22% of the votes) in United Russia’s preliminary voting in Georgievsky single-member district No. 68, but only sixth (19.77%) in the party-wide list voting.

On September 18, 2016, she was elected as a deputy to the 7th State Duma and became a member of the Committee on Culture.

From 2016 to 2019, during her term in the 7th State Duma, she co-authored 46 legislative initiatives and amendments to federal draft laws.

== Sanctions ==
Due to Bondarenko's public support for the Russian invasion of Ukraine, she was sanctioned by the European Union, United Kingdom, United States, Canada, Switzerland, Australia, Japan, Ukraine, and New Zealand.
