= Sergei Katsiev =

Russian billionaire businessman

- Born: 1957 or 1958 (age 67–68)
- Education: Moscow Institute of International Relations
- Children: 2

Sergei Katsiev (born January 1, 1958) is a Russian billionaire and retail businessman.

== Early life ==
Katsiev was born in Voznesensk, Ukraine. He earned a bachelor's degree from the Moscow Institute of International Relations.

== Career ==
After the fall of Soviet Union, he worked in a government trade mission to the Netherlands. When he returned to Russia, he headed Mercury Tobacco Corporation, a company owned by Igor Kesaev.

In 1998 he founded his own company, Megapolis. In 2006 these two companies merged, and Megapolis is now the largest tobacco retailer in Russia.

In 2022 Katsiev and his partners bought out the Russian assets of the British tobacco company Imperial Brands.

== Net worth ==
As of August 2022, Katsiev is worth US$1.2 billion. He was ranked #1833 on the Forbes 2021 list of world billionaires.

== Personal life ==
Katsiev is married, has two children, and lives in Moscow.
