= Budyonnovsk Air Base =

Airport in Stavropol Krai, Russia

Budyonnovsk (Budennovsk)
- Budyonnovsk, Stavropol Krai in Russia
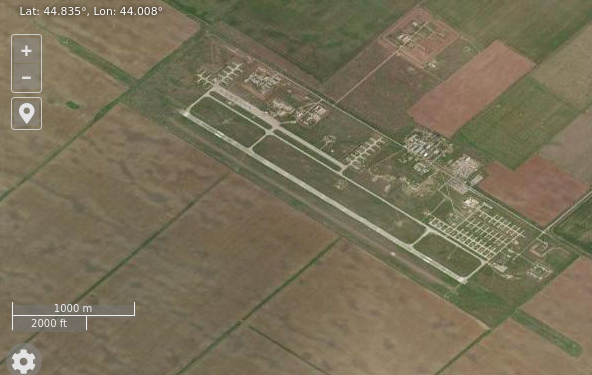
- Satellite imagery of Budyonnovsk air base

Site information
- Type: Air Base
- Owner: Ministry of Defence
- Operator: Russian Aerospace Forces
- Controlled by: 4th Air and Air Defence Forces Army

Location
- Shown within Stavropol Krai Budyonnovsk (Russia)
- Coordinates: 44°50′07″N 44°00′28″E

Site history
- In use: Unknown - present

Airfield information
Runways
| Direction | Length and surface |
|---|---|
| 12/30 | 2,500 metres (8,202 ft) Concrete |

Budyonnovsk is an airbase of the Russian Aerospace Forces as part of the 4th Air and Air Defence Forces Army, Southern Military District.

The airbase lies 14 km (8.7 miles) southeast of the town of Budyonnovsk, in Stavropol Krai.

The base is home to the 368th Assault Aviation Regiment (368th ShAP) which has two squadrons of Sukhoi Su-25SM/SM3 (NATO: Frogfoot-A) and the 487th Independent Combat Control Helicopter Regiment.

The 386th deployed to Millerovo (air base) as part of the 2022 Russian invasion of Ukraine.

== See also ==
- List of military airbases in Russia
