= Georgiyevsk =

Town in Stavropol Krai, Russia

Georgiyevsk Георгиевск
- Town
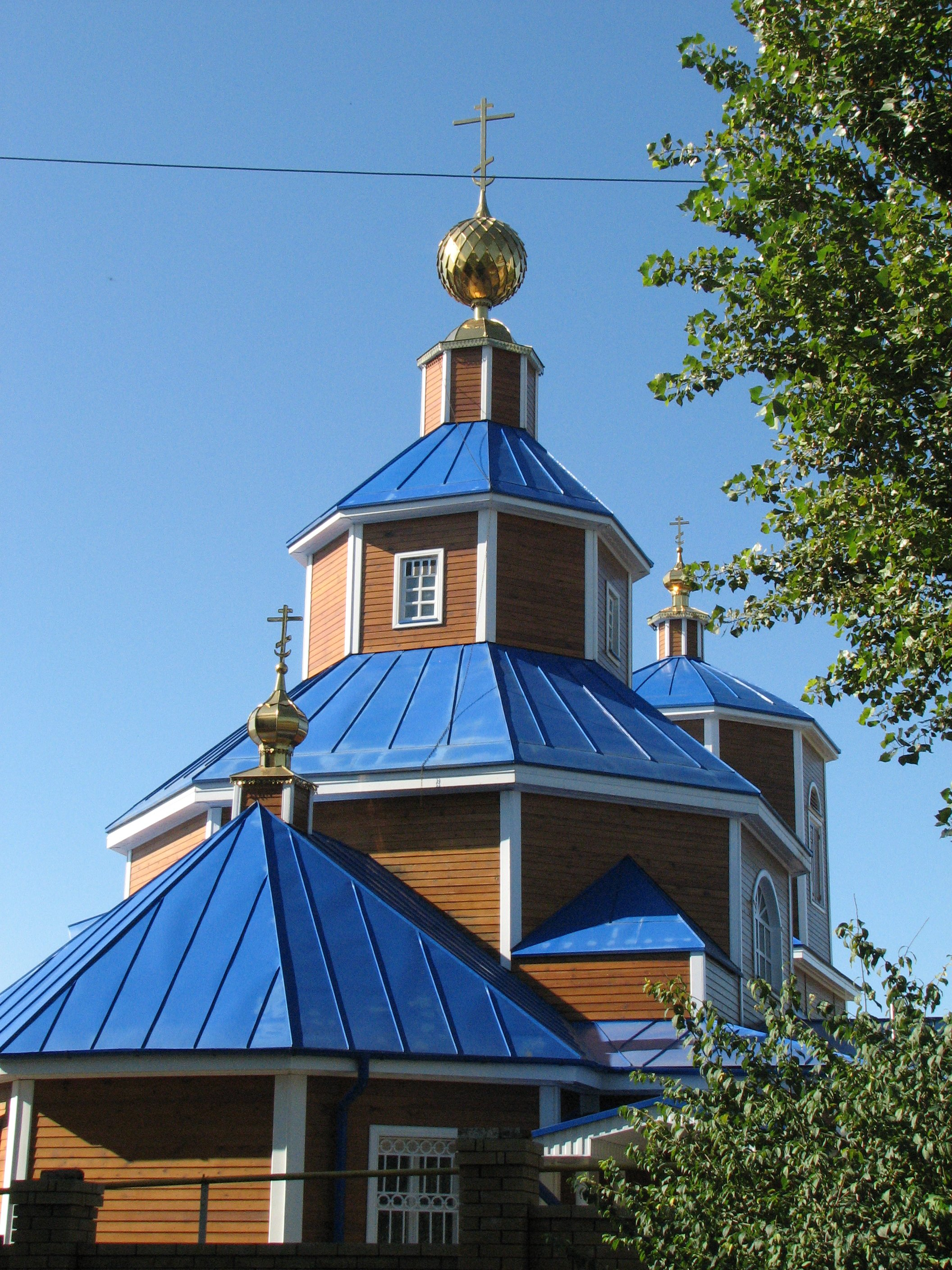
- St. Nicholas Church of the Georgiyevsk Fortress

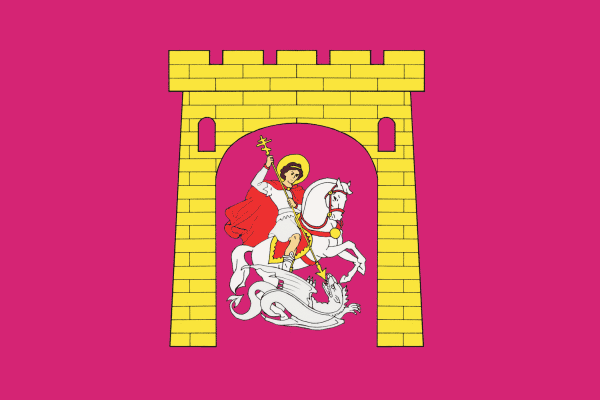
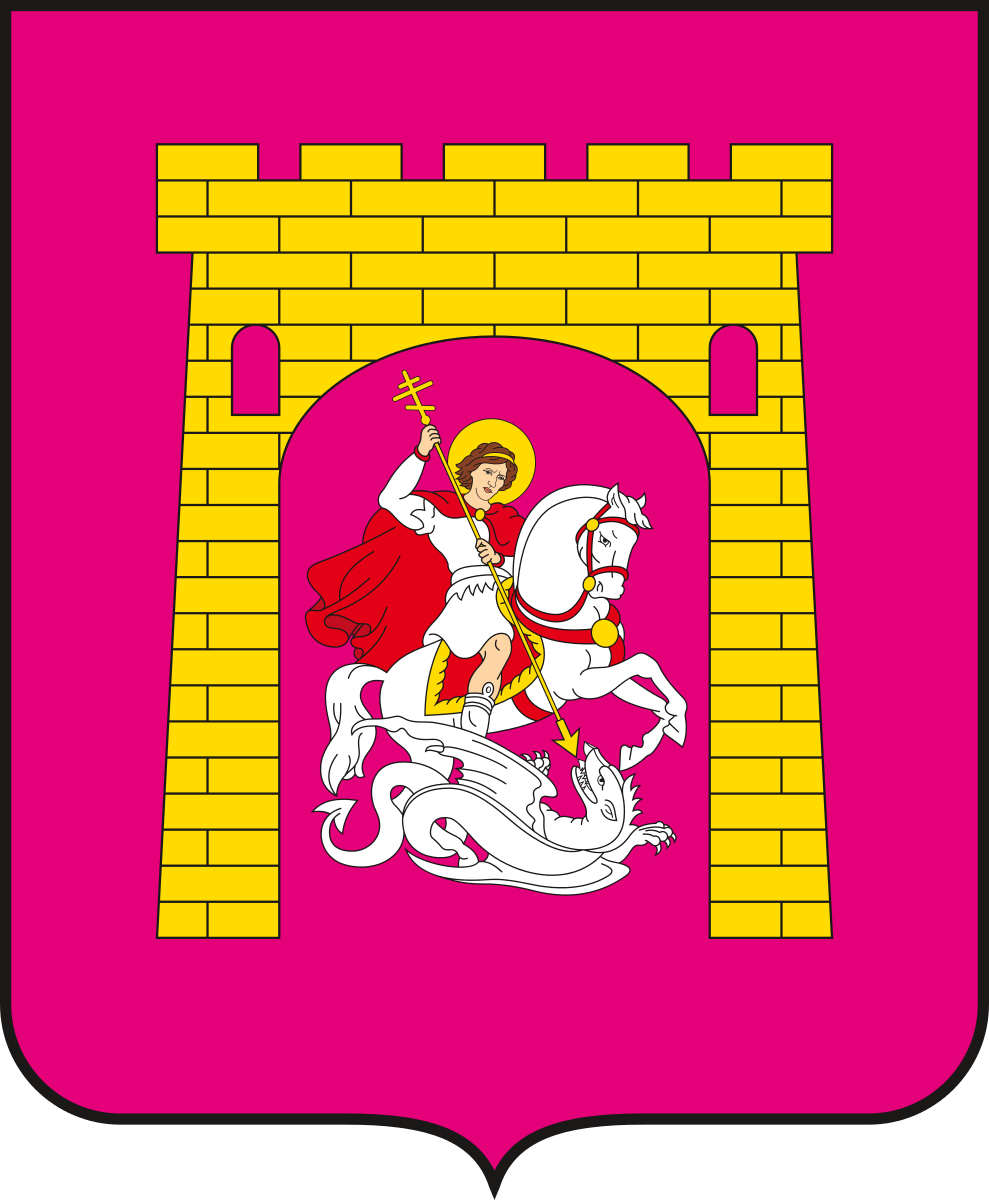
- Flag Coat of arms
- Interactive map of Georgiyevsk
- Location of Georgiyevsk Georgiyevsk (Stavropol Krai)
- Coordinates: 44°09′N 43°28′E
- Country: Russia
- Federal subject: Stavropol Krai
- 1777
- Town status since: 1786
- Elevation: 300 m (980 ft)

Population (2010 Census)
  - Total: 72,153
  - Estimate (2025): 61,046 (−15.4%)
  - Rank: 218th in 2010

Administrative status
  - Subordinated to: town of krai significance of Georgiyevsk
  - Capital of: town of krai significance of Georgiyevsk, Georgiyevsky District

Municipal status
  - Urban okrug: Georgiyevsk Urban Okrug
  - Capital of: Georgiyevsk Urban Okrug, Georgiyevsky Municipal District
- Time zone: UTC+3 (MSK)
- Postal code: 357820
- OKTMO ID: 07707000001
- Website: www.georgievsk.ru

Georgiyevsk (Russian: Гео́ргиевск; Iron Ossetic: Гуым) is a historical town in Stavropol Krai, Russia, located in the North Caucasus on submontane tableland on the right bank of the Podkumok River (a tributary of the Kuma River), 210 kilometers (130 mi) southeast of Stavropol. Population: 72,153 (2010 census).

== History ==
It was founded in September 1777 as St. George fortress on the Azov-Mozdok defense line. In 1783, Georgievsk saw the signing of the Treaty of Georgievsk between the Russian Empire and the Kingdom of Kartli-Kakheti, which made the east Georgian kingdom a Russian protectorate. After 1785, Georgiyevsk grew considerably. In 1786, it was granted town status. After 1802, it was the seat of Caucasian Governorate. The early 19th century marked a peak in Georgiyevsk's influence as a trading center. After 1822, the town's influence began to wane.

In 1875, a railway station was built 6 kilometers (3.7 mi) away in Nezlobnaya. This became a new beginning in town's development. In 1894, the first blacksmith works was founded. This was the beginning of "ArZiL", the biggest enterprise in the town. In 1900, a slaughter house and an oil mill were founded. In the 1920s, Georgiyevsk became a big industrial and trade center of the Ciscaucasia.

During World War II, Georgiyevsk was under German occupation from 15 August 1942 to 10 January 1943. After the war, Georgiyevsk became the largest center of machine construction in Stavropol Krai.

== Administrative and municipal status ==
Within the framework of administrative divisions, Georgiyevsk serves as the administrative center of Georgiyevsky District, eve though it is not a part of it. As an administrative division, it is incorporated separately as the town of krai significance of Georgiyevsk—an administrative unit with the status equal to that of a district. As a municipal division, the town of krai significance of Georgiyevsk is incorporated as Georgiyevsk Urban Okrug.

== Economy ==
Today, Georgiyevsk is one of the largest industrial towns in the area with an accessory plant, repair and engineering works, nail works, semiconductor plant, acoustical and insulation material works, brickworks, two asphalt refineries, garment, shoe and fur plants, and a number of food processing facilities, including H.J. Heinz instant baby food plant.

=== Transportation ===
Georgiyevsk is a railway junction with connections to Moscow, St. Petersburg, Minsk, Krasnodar, Rostov-on-Don, Grozny, Vladikavkaz, Mineralnye Vody, Prokhladny, Budyonnovsk, and Nezlobnaya.

Public transport consists mainly of marshrutkas (routed taxis).

== Demographics ==
The Georgiyevsk MSA is the second-largest of the MSA's of the Caucasus Mineral Waters region, which is a conurbation with 1.1 million inhabitants in the center of the North Caucasus.

=== Historical population ===
- 1897 Census: 11,000;
- 1914 Census: 21,200;
- 1939 Census: 31,600;
- 1959 Census: 35,100;
- 1970 est.: 44,000;
- 1979 Census: 53,600;
- 62,926 (1989 Soviet census);
- 70,575 (2002 census);
- 72,153 (2010 census).

== Town planning ==
Georgiyevsk has right-angled planning in the town center—a legacy of the fortress. The old town center was in the high bank on the Podkumok River near the Nikolskaya church—the oldest Orthodox church in Stavropol Krai—and a monument of wooden architecture of the 18th century.

The modern town center was built at the beginning of the 20th century around the fair square. The best examples of architecture of that period are the Old City Hall, the former Hotel "Louvre", the former Hotel "London", and Public Secondary schools #1 and #3. First enterprises were built at that time to the north of the town center. In the 1920s and 1930s, the area near the railway station was built out. After the World War II, Georgiyevsk grew quickly in the western residential areas and northern industrial areas. From the 1970s to the 1990s, several multistoried blocks were built in the southwest of the town. Today, the main part of Georgiyevsk is an area of owner-occupied dwellings. Multistoried buildings are situated in the central part of the town and in the "Beryozka" microdistrict. The town has three industrial areas, the largest of which is to the north of the town.

One of the local attraction is the Georgiyevsk Skyscraper, a twelve-story building, with views of Georgiyevsk, the Stavropol steppe, and Caucasus Mountains.

== Education and culture ==
Georgiyevsk is an important educational center, with nine secondary schools, five vocational school, and fifteen universities and universities' satellite campuses with more than 20,000 students. It also has a Palace of Culture with a public theater, a casino, a museum, parks, Iodine-bromine mineral waters, and several churches.

== Tourism ==
In the corner of Pobedy Square and Pyatigorskaya Street is the Old City Hall, which has a bell tower from the 20th century. In the other corner of the square, opposite the Central Drugstore, stands the Monument for International Friendship. This is the beginning of Golovinsky boulevard. Tykhe road is very short and ends at the Eternal Flame on Oktyabrskya street.

On the Old Boulevard, visitors can see the Youth Palace, located in the building of the Georgiyevsk City Bank, the best example of the modern architecture in the town. There are some cafés and restaurant on the boulevard with building of different ages and architectural styles. The Old Boulevard leads to the Central Town Park. It is rather small but not long ago it was reconstructed and now has several side-shows.

The New Boulevard leads to the historical center of the town at Lermontov street. On the left side, there is a town museum in a building known as Dara. It was built at the beginning of 20th century. The owner was the producer of the first amateur theater in the town. On the right side is the mansion of Tumasov with lions of the top of the gates and the huge Palace of Culture. The Palace is now a drama theater but was once a town assembly hall.

At the end of the New Boulevard is Stela, a twenty-meter monument to mark the 200th anniversary of signing of the Treaty of Georgievsk. Until the 1930s, the Voznesensky Cathedral, which was similar to the Cathedral of Christ the Savior in Moscow, stood here.

Behind the Stela is Oktyabrskaya street through Old Georgiyevsk. The street runs high over the Podkumok river, from where there are views of the Caucasus Mountains from Mount Kazbek to Mount Elbrus, the Podkumok forest and the lower part of the town. A short distance away is the most important monument in Georgiyevsk, the Nikolskaya church, which was carried to the St. George fortress from the Khopyor River in the 1780s. This is the only church not demolished by the Soviet authorities. This is the old town center, the location of the St. George fortress.

Other areas Georgiyevsk have little of interest for tourists. Local souvenirs include "Georgiyevskaya krepost", a local wine. Georgiyevsk is one of the biggest in Russia centers for items made from fur, and many items are available in the central market.

On the way to Pyatigorsk there are old Cossacks stanitsas—Nezlobnaya, Lysogorskaya, and Goryachevodsk. A wooden church of Rozhdestva Presvyatoy Bogoroditsy (The Birth of the Blessed Virgin), built in 1886, is situated in the center of Lysogorskaya.

== Notable people ==
Well-known Russians who visited Georgiyevsk include: Alexander Pushkin, Mikhail Lermontov, Leo Tolstoy, Maxim Gorky, and Emperor Alexander II. Generals Nikolay Raevsky and Alexey Yermolov lived in the town.
