= Flag of Chuvashia =

Flag of republic within Russian Federation

Chuvash Republic — Chuvashia
- Proportion: 5:8
- Adopted: 29 April 1992
- Design: A yellow flag with a stylized red tree of life charged on the flag.
- Designed by: Elli Mikhaylovich Yurev
- Flag of the president of the Chuvash Republic
- Proportion: 1:1

The flag of Chuvashia, (Note: Chuvash: Чӑваш Республикин ялавӗ, romanized: Çăvaş Respublikin yalavĕ; Russian: Флаг Чувашской Республики) a republic of the Russian Federation, is one of the official symbols of the Chuvashia, alongside the coat of arms and the state anthem. The flag is a 5:8 yellow flag with a stylized red tree of life charged on the flag. The flag has been used officially as the flag of the Chuvash Republic since 14 October 1992.

Prior to 1992, the Chuvash Republic existed as the Chuvash Autonomous Soviet Socialist Republic. Prior to 1937, Chuvash ASSR used a flag with traditional motifs of Chuvashia and the name of the ASSR. The motifs was deleted later in 1931 due to the Communist Party taking the position that traditional motifs were associated with chauvinism and bourgeois nationalism. After 1937, the flag of the Chuvash ASSR was identical to the flag of the Russian SFSR.

== Symbolism ==
The colors of the national flag, which consisted of gold and purple (sandal red) are the traditional colors of the Chuvash people. In Chuvash tradition, gold symbolized wealth, justice, mercy, magnanimity, constancy, strength, and loyalty, while purple is one of the most common colors among the Chuvash symbolism, which were used to carry out the main elements of the folk ornament. Purple symbolizes dignity, power, and courage.

The top yellow field, which is 4/5 of the height of the flag, indicates the space under the sun, inhabited by the people of the Chuvash Republic. The lower purple field, which is 1/5 of the height of the flag, denotes the territory of Chuvashia .

The tree of life, which occupies 3/5 of the width of the flag, is a sign made on the basis of Old Chuvash runic writing, whose silhouette resembles a revered oak tree of Chuvash, powerful and durable, resistant to natural storms. The symmetry of the composition "The Tree of Life" expresses the desire of the Chuvash people for inner spiritual harmony and harmony with the outside world and nature. In addition, the Tree of Life, as a single organism, personifies the unity of the people living in the territory of the Chuvash Republic.

The tree of life consists of five elements, the main one being the center of the whole composition, the base has a bottom field and ends at the top with two branches of the Tree diverging at 90 degrees in the form of a national ornament. This element means the indigenous population of the Chuvash Republic – Chuvash, living in the territory of the republic.

The two lower elements, located symmetrically on both sides of the main element, have a base of purple bands separated from the lower purple field and the main element with a yellow strip 1.5% wide of the flag, and end with "branches" in the form of a national ornament. These elements symbolizes the Chuvash diaspora.

Two middle elements in the form of short inclined strips not adjacent to the main trunk of the Tree and also ending with a national ornament, located symmetrically on both sides of the main element at an angle of 45 degrees to it between the "branches" of the main and lower elements, which symbolizes the population of the different nationalities living in the Chuvash Republic.

The emblem "Three suns", consisting of a three-fold repetitive ancient solar sign (an eight-pointed star), symbolizes the sunlight that gives life and protects well-being. Threefold repetition of the star that overshadows the main emblem of the flag – "The Tree of Life" means the Chuvash folk concept "Pulna, Pur, Pulatpar" ("Were, Is, We Shall") and is its graphic expression.

Colors of the Chuvash Flag
	Red	Yellow
CMYK	8, 92, 100, 33	0, 9, 100, 0
Pantone	484 CP	109 CP
RGB	162, 38, 11	255, 223, 0
HEX	#A2260B	#FFDE00

== Gallery ==
=== References ===
The flag of the town of Tsivilsk, with Chuvash "Tree of Life" in figurative style

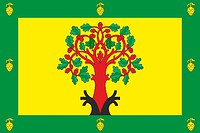
The flag of the municipal district of Tsivilsk

=== History ===
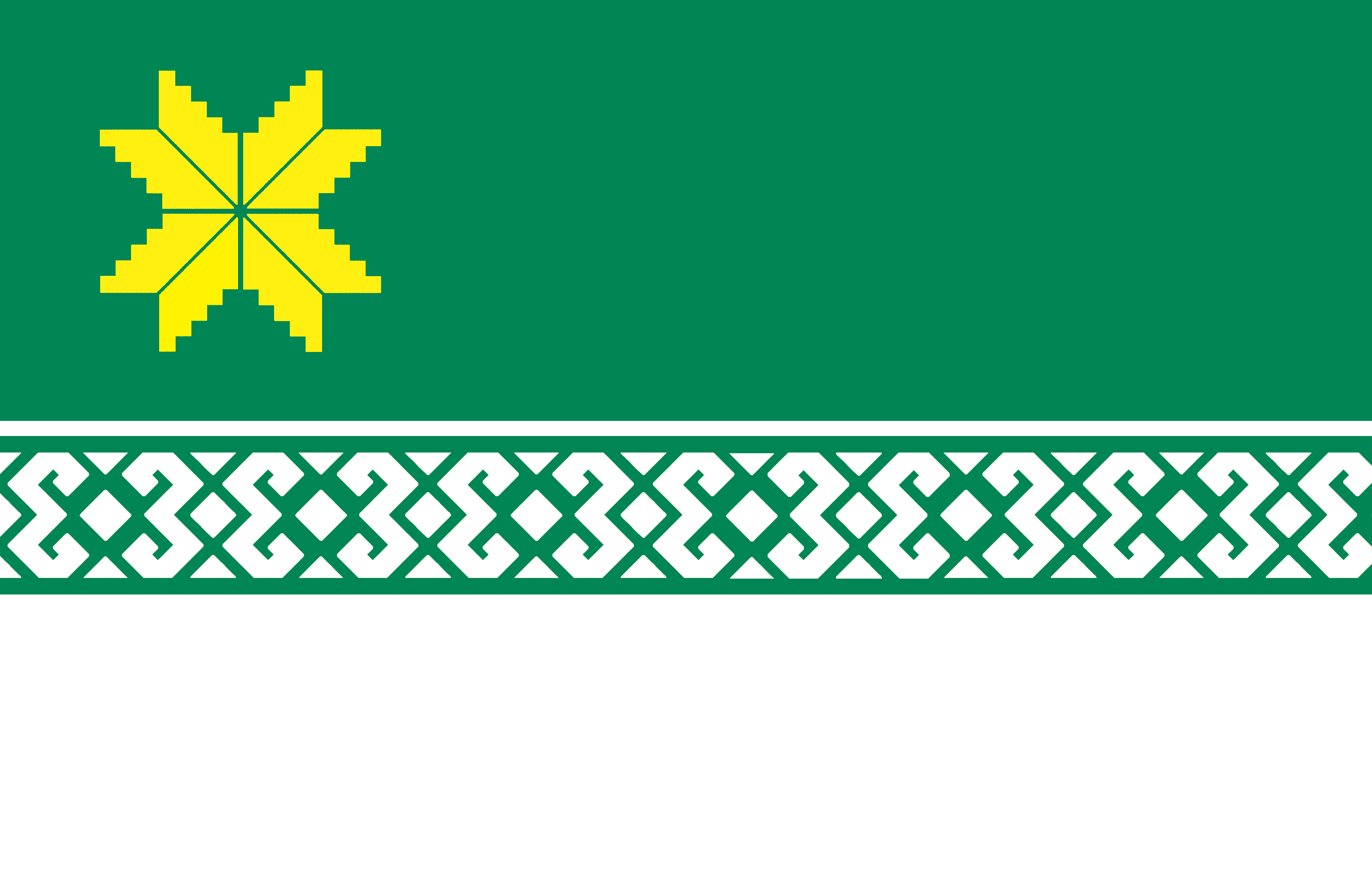
The flag of the Chuvash Republic 1918 (reconstruction)

Chuvash ASSR (1926–1927)

Chuvash ASSR (1927–1931)

Chuvash ASSR (1931–1933)

Chuvash ASSR (1933–1937)

Chuvash ASSR (1937–1940)

Chuvash ASSR (1940–1954)

Chuvash ASSR (1954–26 October 1978)

Chuvash ASSR (26 October 1978 – 24 October 1990)

Chuvash SSR (24 October 1990–13 February 1992) and the Chuvash Republic (13 February–29 April 1992)

=== Proposals ===
Project of the Chuvash Cultural Community in Estonia (1990)

A.V. Pavlov Proposal (1990)

Project proposed by the Society of Chuvash Culture in Estonia Tšuvaši Kultuuriselts (1990)

Alternative project proposed by the Society of Chuvash Culture in Estonia Tšuvaši Kultuuriselts (1990)

S. A. Sindyachkin Proposal (1990)

A. V. Ulangin Proposal (1990)

Chuvash diaspora project (1992)

== Notes ==
=== Bibliography ===
- Pavlov, A. P. (1995). Государственные символы Чувашской Республики [The national emblem of the Chuvash Republic]. Shupashkar: Chuvash book publishing house.
- Potapov, I.A. (1994), Koryakin, K.K. (ed.), Саха Республикатын Государственнай дьаралыга уонна Государственнай былааҕа; Государственный герб и Государственный флаг Республики Саха (Якутия) [State Emblem and State Flag of the Republic of Sakha (Yakutia)] (in Russian and Yakut), Yakutsk: Sakha National Book Publishing, p. 68

==== Constitutions ====
- Central Executive Committee of the Yakut ASSR (1925), Конституция (Основной закон) Якутской Автономной Советской Социалистической Республики [Constitution of the Yakut Autonomous Soviet Socialist Republic], e.nlrs.ru (in Russian), Yakutsk: Gostipografia
