= Flag of Kemerovo Oblast =

Flag of Kemerovo Oblast since 2020

The flag of Kemerovo Oblast is a red rectangle with a blue stripe at the hoist side, its width 1/3 of the flag length. In the upper part of the blue stripe is the Kemerovo Oblast coat of arms. The coat of arms contains the year 1943, the year of the oblast's foundation, on a red Order of Lenin ribbon with gold edges. The emblem contains a pick axe and a hammer. The oblast is one of Russia's major coal and metal mining regions. The flag ratio is 1:2, however a variant used from 2002 is 2:3 ratio.

The previous flag, used from 2002 to 2003

The previous flag, used from 2003 to 2020

The current version of the flag was approved on 10 March 2020, after changes were made to the coat of arms of the Oblast. The previous flag was adopted on 7 June 2002, however according to Sergei Sherniakov of the Heraldic Committee of Perm Region the adoption date of the Kemerovo Oblast flag was 29 May 2002.
