= Flag of Kursk Oblast =

- Use: Civil flag
- Proportion: 2:3
- Adopted: 17 December 1996

The flag of Kursk Oblast was adopted on 17 December 1996. The flag consists of five stripes of red, silver, gold, and black in the ratio 2:1:1:1:2. The black, white, and gold stripes are defaced by the Coat of arms of Kursk Oblast. The flag has a width-length ratio of 2:3 and was adopted under law N19-3KO.

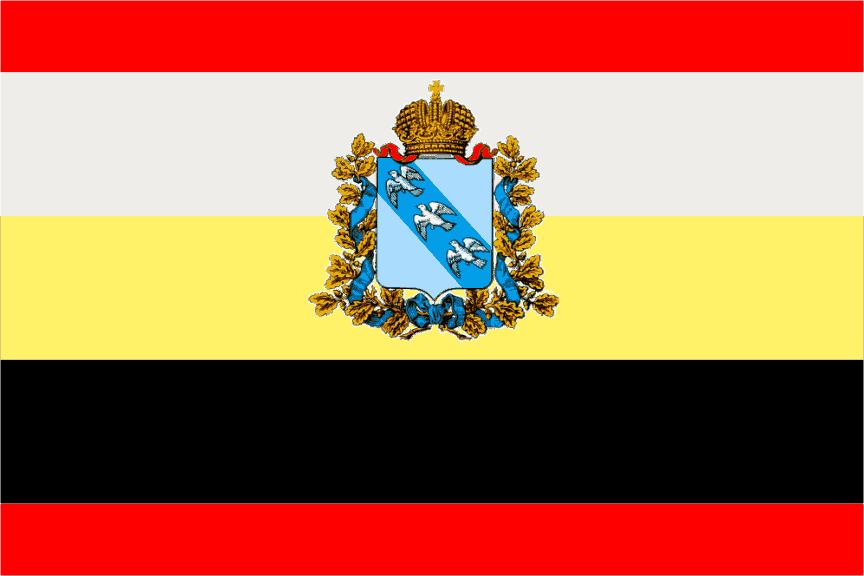
An earlier depiction of the flag, showing the horizontal stripes in a ratio of 1:2:2:2:1 and the coat of arms covering only two stripes.

The stripes in the middle of this flag are inspired by the Black-yellow-white flag of the Russian Empire that was the country's official flag between 1858 and 1883. The oblast flag was designed under the supervision of Governor Alexander Rutskoy who was in office between 1996 and 2000.

== Other flags ==
=== Administrative Divisions ===
Flag	Date	Use	Description
	?–present	Flag of Kursk city	
	2000–?	Flag of Kursk city	
	2013–present	Flag of Kurchatov	
	October 2017–present	Flag of Zheleznogorsk	
	February 2017–October 2017	Flag of Zheleznogorsk	
	2009–present	Flag of Belovsky District	
	2023–present	Flag of Glushkovsky District	
	2021–present	Flag of Khomutovsky District	
	2017–present	Made in Konyshyovsky District	
	2019–present	Flag of Medvensky District	
	?–2019	Flag of Medvensky District	
	2021–present	Flag of Oboyansky District	
	2021–present	Flag of Shchigrovsky District	
	2021–present	Flag of Zheleznogorsky District	
	2023–present	Flag of Kastorensky District	
	2021–present	Flag of Oktyabrsky District	
	2023–present	Flag of Manturovsky District	

=== Settlements ===
Flag	Date	Use	Description
	2006–present	Flag of Rylsk	
	2020–present	Flag of Oboyan	
	?–present	Flag of Sudzha	
