= Levokumskoye =

Rural locality in Stavropol Krai, Russia

Coordinates: 44°49′22″N 44°39′33″E

Flag of Levokumskoye

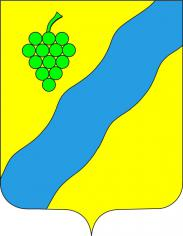
Coat of arms of Levokumskoye

Levokumskoye (Russian: Левокумское) is a rural locality (a selo) and the administrative center of Levokumsky District, Stavropol Krai, Russia. Population: 10,302 (2010 census); 11,176 (2002 census); 10,962 (1989 Soviet census).
