= Flag of Vladimir Oblast =

Vladimir Oblast
- Use: Civil flag
- Proportion: 2:3
- Adopted: 28 April 1999; 1 July 2017 (current proportion)

The flag of Vladimir Oblast, a federal subject of Russia, was adopted 28 April 1999. The flag is a field of red with a light blue band on the hoist. The band is 1/8 the length of the flag and has a hammer and sickle at the top. The field is charged in the center with the coat of arms of Vladimir Oblast, which is 1/3 the length of the field. The ratio of the flag is 2:3.

The flag design is based on the 1954 flag of the Russian SFSR.

== Flags ==
=== Historical flags ===
Flag	Date	Government	Notes
	1790–1805	Flag of Vladimir Governorate	
	1858–1883	Flag of Vladimir Governorate	
	1883–1917	Flag of Vladimir Governorate	
	1918–1936	Flag of Vladimir Okrug	
	1937–1954	Flag of Suzdal Oblast	
	1955–1991	Flag of Vladimir Oblast	
	28 April 1999–1 July 2017	Russian Federation	Flag of Vladimir Oblast with its former 1:2 ratio, used until 30 June 2017
	1 July 2017–present	Russian Federation	

=== Other flags ===
Flag	Date	Use	Description
	?–present	Flag of Vladimir city	Red background with a yellow Lion holding a cross and wearing a crown.
	?–present	Flag of Gus-Khrustalny	
	?–present	Flag of Kovrov	
	?–present	Flag of Murom	
	?–present	Flag of Alexandrovsky District	
	?–present	Flag of Gorokhovetsky District	
	?–present	Flag of Gus-Khrustalny District	
	?–present	Flag of Kirzhachsky District	
	?–present	Flag of Kolchuginsky District	
	?–present	Flag of Melenkovsky District	
	?–present	Flag of Muromsky District	
	?–present	Flag of Selivanovsky District	
	?–present	Flag of Sobinsky District	
	?–present	Flag of Sudogodsky District	
	?–present	Flag of Suzdalsky District	
	?–present	Flag of Vyaznikovsky District	
	2006–present	Flag of Yuryev-Polsky District	
	?–2006	Flag of Yuryev-Polsky District	
