= Flag of Smolensk Oblast =

Smolensk Oblast

The official flag of Smolensk Oblast was adopted on 22 December 1998. the flag of Smolensk Oblast is a rectangular red cloth with a ratio of width to length 2:3 at the bottom are two yellow stripes occupying 5 percent of the flag width and dividing the flag in width into three parts in a 6:2:1 ratio. Above the flagpole there is a shortened version of the coat of arms of the Smolensk Oblast - a shield with a cap occupying 45 percent of the width and 20 percent of the flag's length, and the vertical axis of the coat of arms divides the flag in a 1:4 ratio. The flag cloth can be framed with gold fringe.

On December 10, 1998, by Decision No. 179, the Regional Duma adopted the Law "On the Coat of Arms and Flag of Smolensk Region" No. 38-z of December 22, 1998. The law entered into force on December 30.

== Other flags ==
Flag	Date	Use	Description
	?–present	Flag of Smolensk city	Red background with 3 vertical gold-yellow stripes with a white square charged with a cannon and the Gamayun on the canton
	?–present	Flag of Gagarin	
	?–present	Flag of Vyazma	
	?–present	Flag of Roslavl	
	?–present	Flag of Desnogorsk	
	?–present	Flag of Dorogobuzh	
	?–present	Flag of Yelnya	
	?–present	Flag of Demidovsky District	
	?–present	Flag of Dukhovshchinsky District	
	?–present	Flag of Gagarinsky District	
	?–present	Flag of Kardymovsky District	
	?–present	Flag of Khislavichsky District	
	?–present	Flag of Kholm-Zhirkovsky District	
	?–present	Flag of Monastyrshchinsky District	
	?–present	Flag of Pochinkovsky District	
	?–present	Flag of Roslavlsky District	
	?–present	Flag of Shumyachsky District	
	?–present	Flag of Smolensky District	
	?–present	Flag of Sychyovsky District	
	?–present	Flag of Tyomkinsky District	
	2009–present	Flag of Yartsevsky District	
