= Flag of Magadan Oblast =

- Proportion: 2:3
- Design: Field of red; alternating waves of blue and white on bottom; Oblast coat of arms in upper-hoist side

The flag of Magadan Oblast depicts alternating waves of blue and white on a red field. In the upper-hoist side, the oblast's coat of arms is shown. The flag is reminiscent of the Soviet flags of Estonia and Latvia, despite those former republics being on the other side of Eurasia. The flag is also similar to the flag of Magadan proper, while replacing the deer for the coat of arms.
