= Flag of Voronezh Oblast =

Voronezh Oblast
- Use: State flag
- Proportion: 2:3
- Adopted: 5 July 2005
- Design: Red background with yellow rocks with a turned over white vase with water coming out of it

The flag of Voronezh Oblast, a federal subject of Russia, was adopted 5 July 2005. The flag is a field of red, with a grouping of yellow rocks on the hoist side. Over the rocks, a liquid (spring waters) pours out of a turned-over white vase. It is also on the Voronezhan coat of arms. The ratio of the flag is 2:3.

The pile of stones represents the steep right bank of the city of Voronezh, while the water pouring from the jug represents the flowing Don River, more specifically, the Voronezh River tributary. The jug itself, a "creation of skilled human hands", symbolises the diligence of Voronezh's people. It first appeared on the coat of arms of the city of Voronezh approved by the emperor on September 21, 1781 (Old Style).

According to Resolution #292-II adopted by the Voronezh City Duma on September 26, 2008 for the city flag, the argent (silver) of the jug and water is symbolic of nobility, purity, justice, generosity and peace. Gules (red) of the field is the colour for vital force, fortitude, festivity, beauty and labour which characterises the city of Voronezh as an industrially developed centre. The golden of the rocks signifies harvest, exuberance and fertility, symbolising a well developed agrarian sector of economy. At the same time the gold represents nobility, respect, honour, mental power, light and spirituality.

== Other flags ==
Flag	Date	Use	Description
	2008–present	Flag of Voronezh city	
	?–present	Flag of Borisoglebsk	
	?–present	Flag of Novovoronezh	
	?–present	Flag of Anninsky District	
	?–present	Flag of Bobrovsky District	
	?–present	Flag of Bogucharsky District	
	?–present	Flag of Borisoglebsky District	
	?–present	Flag of Buturlinovsky District	
	?–present	Flag of Ertilsky District	
	?–present	Flag of Gribanovsky District	
	?–present	Flag of Kalacheyevsky District	
	?–present	Flag of Kamensky District	
	?–present	Flag of Kantemirovsky District	
	?–present	Flag of Kashirsky District	
	?–present	Flag of Khokholsky District	
	?–present	Flag of Liskinsky District	
	?–present	Flag of Nizhnedevitsky District	
	?–present	Flag of Novokhopyorsky District	
	?–present	Flag of Novousmansky District	
	?–present	Flag of Olkhovatsky District	
	?–present	Flag of Ostrogozhsky District	
	?–present	Flag of Paninsky District	
	?–present	Flag of Pavlovsky District	
	?–present	Flag of Petropavlovsky District	
	?–present	Flag of Podgorensky District	
	?–present	Flag of Povorinsky District	
	?–present	Flag of Ramonsky District	
	?–present	Flag of Repyovsky District	
	?–present	Flag of Rossoshansky District	
	?–present	Flag of Semiluksky District	
	?–present	Flag of Talovsky District	
	?–present	Flag of Ternovsky District	
	?–present	Flag of Verkhnekhavsky District	
	?–present	Flag of Verkhnemamonsky District	
	?–present	Flag of Vorobyovsky District	
