= Flag of Krasnodar Krai =

Flag of the Russian krai of Krasnodar

Krasnodar Krai
- Proportion: 2:3
- Adopted: 24 March 1995
- Design: Horizontal tricolour of blue, pink and green charged with the golden coat of arms
- Designed by: N. P. Ishchenko

The flag of Krasnodar Krai (Russian: Флаг Краснодарского края), in the Russian Federation, is a horizontal tricolour (Spanish fess) of blue, pink and green charged with the golden coat of arms of Krasnodar Krai — five monograms of Empress Catherine II and Emperor Alexander I (placed together), Emperors Paul I and Nicholas I (placed together), and Emperor Alexander II (in the center).

The flag was adopted on 24 March 1995 by the Legislative Assembly of Krasnodar Krai, and was modified on 23 June 2004.

== See also ==
- Flag of Kuban, the origin of the tricolour
