= Flag of Ivanovo Oblast =

Ivanovo Oblast
- Proportion: 2:3
- Adopted: 3 March 1998
- Design: Vertical bicolour of red and blue charged with the coat of arms on the top and white waves on the bottom
- Designed by: A. A. Kornikov, S. A. Prikazchikov, A. I. Zestarev, V. P. Terenyev

The flag of Ivanovo Oblast (Russian: Флаг Ивановской области), in the Russian Federation, is a vertical bicolour of red and blue charged with the coat of arms of Ivanovo Oblast on the top and white waves on the bottom.

The flag was adopted on 3 March 1998, by the Ivanovo Oblast Duma.
