= Flag of Kaluga Oblast =

Flag of Kaluga Oblast

The flag of Kaluga Oblast consists of three horizontal stripes: the upper one being red, the middle white, and the lower green. The white stripe is the smallest of the three, occupying 1/6th the total height of the flag, with the other two stripes being of equal height to each other and making up the remaining 5/6ths. Within the center of the red stripe is a golden imperial crown. The ratio of the flag is 2:3. It was adopted on 30 January 2004.
