= Flag of Vologda Oblast =

Flag of Vologda Oblast

The flag of Vologda Oblast, a federal subject of Russia, was adopted 26 November 1997. The flag is a field of white, with a red vertical band on the fly. A charge of the Vologdan seal is in the upper hoist corner. The seal is red, with a hand emerging from a cloud, holding an orb and a sword. A crown floats over the hand. The ratio of the flag is 2:3.

== Other flags ==
Flag	Date	Use	description
	1996–present	Flag of Vologda city	
	?–1996	Flag of Vologda city	
	?–present	Flag of Veliky Ustyug	
	?–present	Flag of Cherepovets	
	?–present	Flag of Babayevsky District	
	?–present	Flag of Babushkinsky District	
	?–present	Flag of Belozersky District	
	?–present	Flag of Vashkinsky District	
	?–present	Flag of Velikoustyugsky District	
	?–present	Flag of Verkhovazhsky District	
	?–present	Flag of Vologodsky District	
	?–present	Flag of Vozhegodsky District	
	?–present	Flag of Vytegorsky District	
	?–present	Flag of Gryazovetsky District	
	2006–present	Flag of Kaduysky District	
	?–2006	Flag of Kaduysky District	
	?–present	Flag of Kirillovsky District	
	2006–present	Flag of Kichmengsko-Gorodetsky District	
	?–2006	Flag of Kichmengsko-Gorodetsky District	
	2001–present	Flag of Mezhdurechensky District	
	?–2001	Flag of Mezhdurechensky District	
	?–present	Flag of Nikolsky District	
	?–present	Flag of Nyuksensky District	
	?–present	Flag of Sokolsky District	
	?–present	Flag of Syamzhensky District	
	?–present	Flag of Tarnogsky District	
	?–present	Flag of Totemsky District	
	?–present	Flag of Ust-Kubinsky District	
	?–present	Flag of Ustyuzhensky District	
	2009–present	Flag of Kharovsky District	
	2007–2009	Flag of Kharovsky District	
	?–2007	Flag of Kharovsky District	
	2006–present	Flag of Chagodoshchensky District	
	?–2006	Flag of Chagodoshchensky District	
	?–present	Flag of Cherepovetsky District	
	2004–present	Flag of Sheksninsky District	
	2002–2004	Flag of Sheksninsky District	
