= Flag of Evenk Autonomous Okrug =

Flag of the Russian autonomous okrug of Evenk

Evenk Autonomous Okrug
- Proportion: 2:3
- Adopted: 23 March 1995
- Design: Horizontal tricolour of light blue, white, and dark blue with a red kumalan emblem at the center
- Designed by: Sergei Salatkin

The flag of Evenk Autonomous Okrug, in the Russian Federation, is a horizontal tricolor of light blue, white, and dark blue, all of which stand for the polar days and nights in Northern Siberia. It is charged in the center by a red kumalan, the solar emblem in Evenki culture.

The flag was designed by Russian artist, Sergei Salatkin, prior to the okrug's merge to Krasnoyarsk Krai on 1 January 2007. It was approved by the district assembly of Evenk on 23 March 1995. The proportions were 2:3.
