= Flag of Komi-Permyak Okrug =

Flag of the Russian okrug of Komi-Permyak

Flag of Komi-Permyak Okrug

The flag of Komi-Permyak Okrug, a former federal subject of the Russian Federation, is a horizontal tricolor of red, white, and blue. In the center of the white stripe there is a red bear, and in the center of the red stripe a perna emblem in white. The perna is the cultural symbol of the Komi-Permyak people.

The proportions of the flag are 2:3. It was adopted on October 14, 2007, 2 years after the Komi-Permyak Okrug was formed following the merging of Komi-Permyak Autonomous Okrug and Perm Oblast on December 1, 2005.

== Flag of Komi-Permyak Autonomous Okrug ==
Flag of Komi-Permyak Autonomous Okrug

The Komi-Permyak Autonomous Okrug adopted its first flag on February 12, 1996. It was a horizontal tricolor of red, white and blue, with a red perna symbol in the center of the white stripe. The proportions of the flag were originally 2:3, but it was changed to 1:2 on June 27, 1997.
