= Igor Kesaev =

Russian billionaire retail businessman (born 1966)

- Игорь Альбертович Кесаев
- Born: 30 October 1966 (age 58); Ordzhonikidze, North Ossetian ASSR, Soviet Russia, USSR
- Citizenship: Russian, Cypriot (2012–2024)
- Education: Moscow State Institute of International Relations
- Children: 3

Igor Albertovich Kesaev (Russian: Игорь Альбертович Кесаев; born 30 October 1966) is a Russian billionaire retail businessman. He is known as the owner and president of the Mercury Group (Russian: Меркурий), which owns Megapolis Group, the leading tobacco distributor in Russia. He is also an owner of weapon manufacturers and retail store chains.

Kesaev has purported links with the Russian government and security forces such as the FSB and GRU.

== Net worth ==
On the Forbes 2022 list of the world's billionaires, he was ranked #1196 with a net worth of US$2.6 billion.

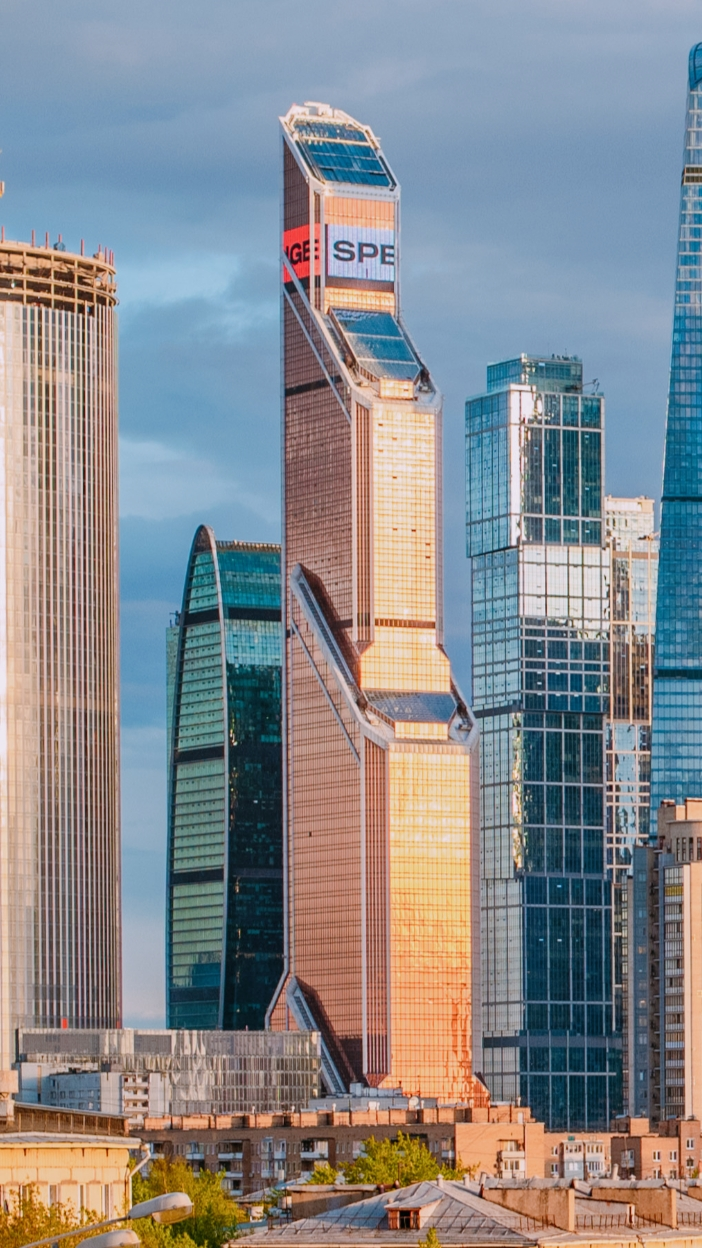
Mercury City Tower in Moscow, owned by the Mercury Group.

== Personal life ==
Kesaev was born in the North Ossetian city of Ordzhonikidze (now known as Vladikavkaz / Dzaudzhikau). Kesaevs (ХЪЕСАТÆ) are a traditionally influential Ossetian family from Zakka Gorge. Kesaev received a bachelor's degree from the Moscow Institute of International Relations.

=== Sanctions ===
Kesaev was sanctioned by Canada under the Special Economic Measures Act (S.C. 1992, c. 17) in relation to the Russian invasion of Ukraine for Grave Breach of International Peace and Security. The European Union and the United Kingdom also sanctioned him in 2022 in relation to the Russo-Ukrainian War. The EU cited his close links and economic ties to state security and military personnel through his various business holdings.

The United States sanctioned Kesaev in May 2023.

On 27 June 2024 the Council of Ministers of Cyprus retracted Kesaev's passport. Kesaev was naturalized as a citizen of Cyprus on 25 May 2012 during the presidency of Demetris Christofias.
