= Komi-Permyak Okrug =

Komi-Permyak Okrug Ко́ми-Пермя́цкий о́круг
- Territory
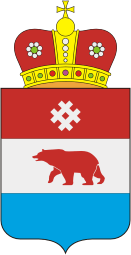
- Flag Seal

- Location of Komi-Permyak Okrug within Perm Krai

- Location of Komi-Permyak Okrug in Russia
- Coordinates: 59°01′N 54°40′E
- Country: Russia
- Federal subject: Perm Krai
- Established: December 1, 2005
- Administrative center: Kudymkar

Area
  - Total: 32,770 km^{2} (12,650 sq mi)

Population (2010)
  - Total: 116,157
  - Density: 3.545/km^{2} (9.181/sq mi)

Komi-Permyak Okrug (Russian: Ко́ми-Пермя́цкий о́круг, Komi-Permyatsky okrug; Komi-Permyak: Коми-Перем кытш, Komi-Perem kyč), or Permyakia was a territory with special status within Perm Krai, Russia. Its administrative center was the town of Kudymkar. Population: 116,157 (2010 census); 136,076 (2002 census); 159,689 (1989 Soviet census).

It was a federal subject of Russia (an autonomous okrug) until December 1, 2005. It was known as Komi-Permyak Autonomous Okrug (Russian: Ко́ми-Пермя́цкий автоно́мный о́круг; Komi: Перым-Коми автономия кытш) at the time.

== Geography ==
Area: 32,770 km^{2}. Location: foothills of the Ural Mountains, upper basin of the Kama River.

== History ==
Komi-Permyak Autonomous Okrug was established on February 26, 1925. It was an administrative division for Komi-Permyaks, a branch of the Komis, within Perm Oblast. After a referendum held in October 2004, the autonomous okrug was merged with Perm Oblast to form Perm Krai. The referendum was held both in Komi-Permyak Autonomous Okrug and Perm Oblast, and the majority of citizens of both regions voted for merging.

Until the merger in 2005, the Komi-Permyak Autonomous Okrug was the only autonomous okrug in which the titular ethnic group made up the majority of the population. The majority was lost in the merger, and the referendum has often been characterized as a "staged" event.

== Administrative divisions ==
(prior to December 1, 2005)

(after December 1, 2005)

== Demographics ==
=== Vital statistics ===
Source: Russian Federal State Statistics Service

	Average population (x 1000)	Live births	Deaths	Natural change	Crude birth rate (per 1000)	Crude death rate (per 1000)	Natural change (per 1000)
1970	210	3 701	1 993	1 708	17.6	9.5	8.1
1975	188	3 605	1 999	1 606	19.2	10.6	8.5
1980	170	3 259	2 572	687	19.2	15.1	4.0
1985	162	3 360	2 444	916	20.7	15.1	5.7
1990	146	2 660	1 931	729	18.3	13.3	5.0
1991	146	2 384	2 043	341	16.3	14.0	2.3
1992	147	2 267	2 111	156	15.4	14.3	1.1
1993	147	2 100	2 547	447	14.3	17.3	-3.0
1994	146	1 946	2 831	885	13.3	19.4	-6.1
1995	144	1 761	2 556	795	12.2	17.7	-5.5
1996	143	1 749	2 510	761	12.2	17.6	-5.3
1997	141	1 724	2 607	883	12.2	18.4	-6.2
1998	140	1 640	2 250	610	11.7	16.1	-4.4
1999	139	1 696	2 495	799	12.2	17.9	-5.7
2000	138	1 652	2 724	-1 072	11.9	19.7	-7.8
2001	137	1 610	2 700	-1 090	11.7	19.7	-7.9
2002	136	1 700	3 090	-1 390	12.5	22.8	-10.2
2003	133	1 675	3 057	-1 382	12.6	22.9	-10.4
2004	130	1 619	3 080	-1 461	12.4	23.6	-11.2
2005	127						
2006	125	1 672	2 813	-1 141	13.4	22.6	-9.2
2007	122	1 845	2 566	721	15.1	21.0	-5.9
2008	120	2 109	2 523	414	17.6	21.0	-3.4
2009	118	2 144	2 447	303	18.1	20.7	-2.6
2010	116	2 253	2 497	244	19.4	21.5	-2.1
2011	114	2,072	2,148	76	18.2	18.8	-0.6

=== Ethnic groups ===
According to the 2002 Census, Komi-Permyaks make up 59.0% of the okrug's population. Other groups include Russians (38.2%), Tatars (1,100, or 0.8%), Ukrainians (706, or 0.5%), Belarusians (672, or 0.5%), and a host of other groups, each accounting for less than 0.5% of the total population.

Ethnic group	1926 census		1959 census		1970 census		1979 census		1989 census		2002 census	
Ethnic group	Number	%	Number	%	Number	%	Number	%	Number	%	Number	%
Komi-Permyaks	117,429	77.0%	125,917	58.0%	123,621	58.3%	105,574	61.4%	95,415	60.2%	80,327	59.0%
Russians	34,814	22.8%	71,381	32.9%	76,340	36.0%	59,760	34.7%	57,272	36.1%	51,946	38.2%
Others	251	0.2%	19,740	9.1%	12,180	5.7%	6,705	3.9%	5,839	3.7%	3,803	2.8%
