= Budyonnovsky District =

Budyonnovsky District Будённовский район
- District
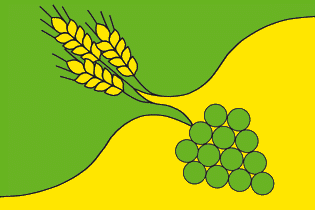
- Flag Coat of arms
- Location of Budyonnovsky District in Stavropol Krai
- Coordinates: 44°47′N 44°09′E
- Country: Russia
- Federal subject: Stavropol Krai
- Established: 1924
- Administrative center: Budyonnovsk

Area
  - Total: 3,203 km^{2} (1,237 sq mi)

Population (2010 Census)
  - Total: 53,251
  - Density: 16.63/km^{2} (43.06/sq mi)
  - Urban: 0%
  - Rural: 100%

Administrative structure
  - Administrative divisions: 10 Selsoviets
  - Inhabited localities: 32 rural localities

Municipal structure
  - Municipally incorporated as: Budyonnovsky Municipal District
  - Municipal divisions: 1 urban settlements, 13 rural settlements
- Time zone: UTC+3 (MSK)
- OKTMO ID: 07612000
- Website: http://budennovsk-rayon.ru/

Budyonnovsky District (Russian: Будённовский райо́н) is an administrative and municipal district (raion), one of the twenty-six in Stavropol Krai, Russia. It is located in the eastern central part of the krai. The area of the district is 3,203 square kilometers (1,237 sq mi). Its administrative center is the town of Budyonnovsk (which is not administratively a part of the district). Population: 53,251 (2010 Census); 54,085 (2002 Census); 47,441 (1989 Census).

== Administrative and municipal status ==
Within the framework of administrative divisions, Budyonnovsky District is one of the twenty-six in the krai. The town of Budyonnovsk serves as its administrative center, despite being incorporated separately as a town of krai significance—an administrative unit with the status equal to that of the districts.

As a municipal division, the district is incorporated as Budyonnovsky Municipal District, with the town of krai significance of Budyonnovsk being incorporated within it as Budyonnovsk Urban Settlement.
