= Budyonnovsk =

Town in Stavropol Krai, Russia

Budyonnovsk Будённовск
- Town
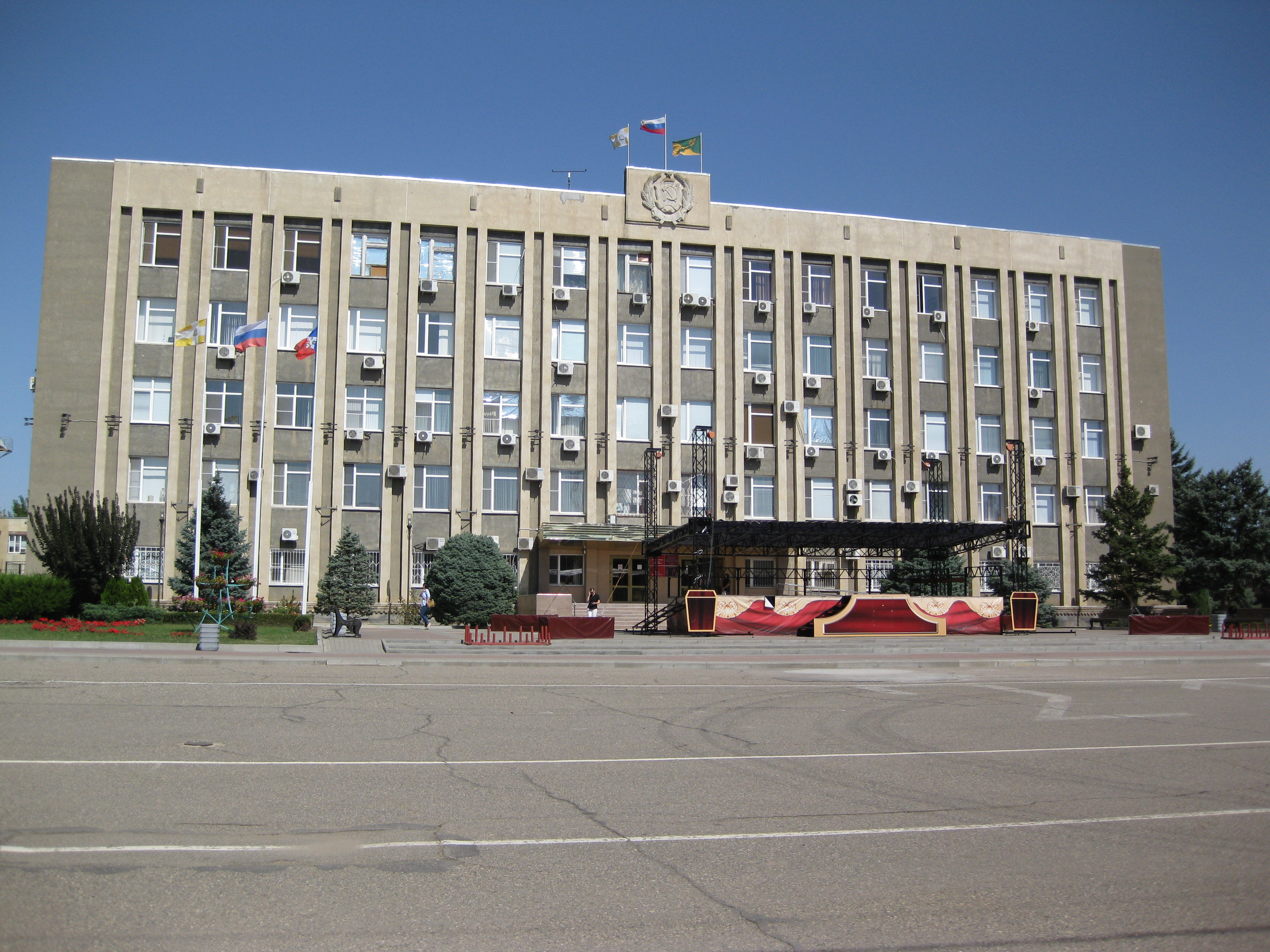
- Seat of the local administration

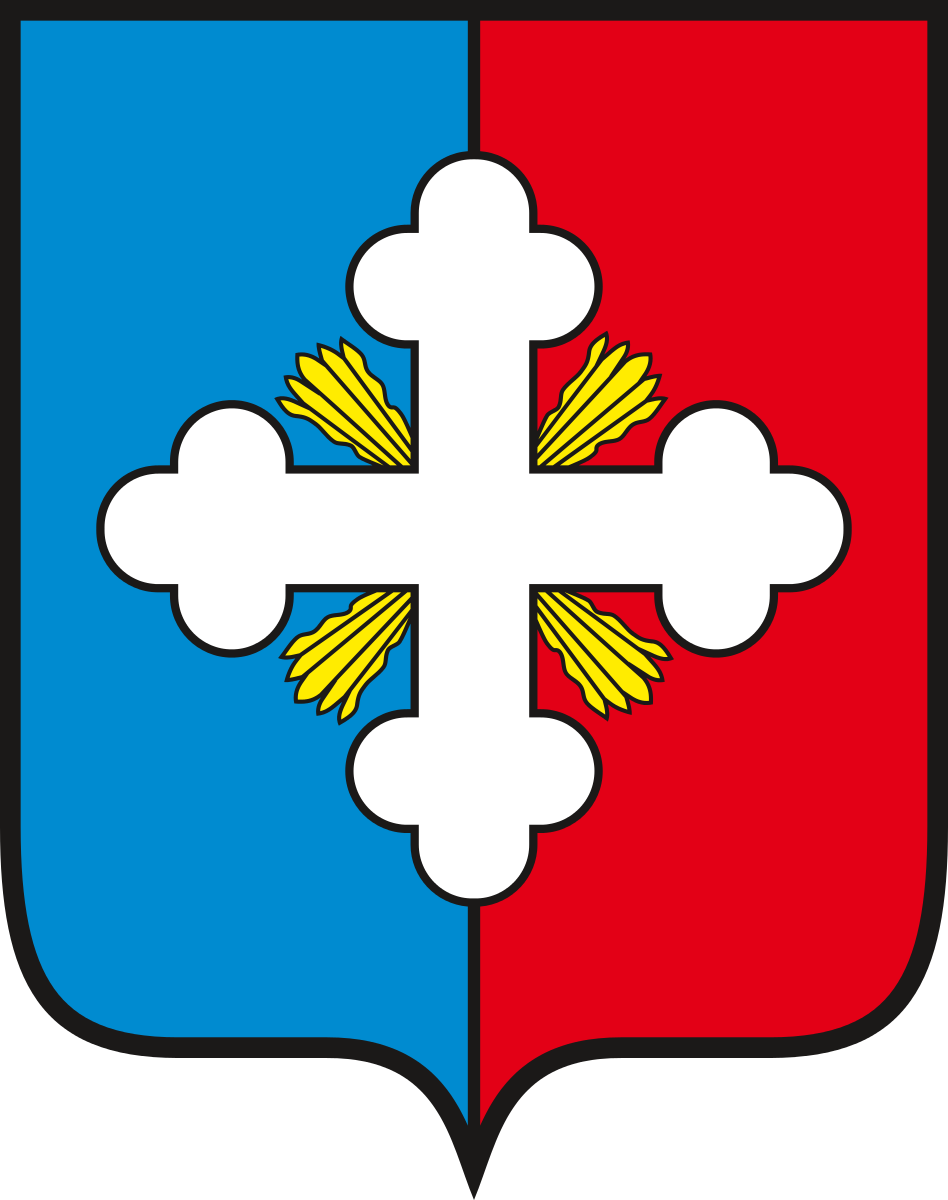
- Flag Coat of arms
- Interactive map of Budyonnovsk
- Location of Budyonnovsk Budyonnovsk (European Russia) Budyonnovsk (Russia)
- Coordinates: 44°47′N 44°10′E
- Country: Russia
- Federal subject: Stavropol Krai
- Founded: 1799

Area
  - Total: 62.1 km^{2} (24.0 sq mi)
- Elevation: 115 m (377 ft)

Population (2021 Census)
  - Total: 58,103
  - Estimate (2025): 56,258 (−3.2%)
  - Rank: 271st in 2021
  - Density: 936/km^{2} (2,420/sq mi)

Administrative status
  - Subordinated to: town of krai significance of Budyonnovsk
  - Capital of: town of krai significance of Budyonnovsk, Budyonnovsky District

Municipal status
  - Municipal district: Budyonnovsky Municipal District
  - Urban settlement: Budyonnovsk Urban Settlement
  - Capital of: Budyonnovsky Municipal District, Budyonnovsk Urban Settlement
- Time zone: UTC+3 (MSK)
- Postal codes: 356800–356803, 356805–356809
- Dialing code: +7 86559
- OKTMO ID: 07612101001
- Website: www.budennovsk-sk.ru

Budyonnovsk (Russian: Будённовск; until 1935 Prikumsk, Russian: Прикумск; Ukrainian: Прикумськ) is a town in Stavropol Krai, Russia. In 2021, the population of Budyonnovsk was 58,103 (2021 census).

== History ==
The town was founded in 1799 by Armenian settlers from Derbent. According to the 1926 census, it had a population of 15,775, 46.8% Russian, 31,4% Armenian, and 19.4% Ukrainian.

During World War II, Budyonnovsk was occupied by German troops from August 18, 1942 to January 10, 1943.

The Budyonnovsk hospital hostage crisis took place in Budyonnovsk from June 14 to 19, 1995.

== Administrative and municipal status ==
Within the framework of administrative divisions, Budyonnovsk serves as the administrative center of Budyonnovsky District, even though it is not a part of it. As an administrative division, it is incorporated separately as the town of krai significance of Budyonnovsk—an administrative unit with the status equal to that of the districts. As a municipal division, the town of krai significance of Budyonnovsk is incorporated within Budyonnovsky Municipal District as Budyonnovsk Urban Settlement.

== Climate ==
Budyonnovsk has a humid continental climate (Köppen: Dfa) with low precipitation, much sunlight and large differences between summer and winter. The town experiences some of the hottest summers in Russia. Although precipitation is relatively low, the proximity of the Caspian Sea brings significant humidity, causing a steamy summer heat.

Climate data for Budyonnovsk
Month	Jan	Feb	Mar	Apr	May	Jun	Jul	Aug	Sep	Oct	Nov	Dec	Year
Record high °C (°F)	17.0 (62.6)	19.7 (67.5)	26.3 (79.3)	34.2 (93.6)	36.7 (98.1)	40.1 (104.2)	43.8 (110.8)	41.6 (106.9)	39.4 (102.9)	32.9 (91.2)	23.9 (75.0)	16.4 (61.5)	43.8 (110.8)
Mean daily maximum °C (°F)	−0.5 (31.1)	0.7 (33.3)	7.3 (45.1)	17.1 (62.8)	24.0 (75.2)	28.7 (83.7)	31.8 (89.2)	30.9 (87.6)	24.7 (76.5)	16.5 (61.7)	8.1 (46.6)	1.9 (35.4)	15.9 (60.7)
Daily mean °C (°F)	−3.8 (25.2)	−3.1 (26.4)	2.2 (36.0)	10.3 (50.5)	17.1 (62.8)	21.8 (71.2)	24.8 (76.6)	23.8 (74.8)	17.9 (64.2)	10.6 (51.1)	4.1 (39.4)	−1.3 (29.7)	10.4 (50.7)
Mean daily minimum °C (°F)	−6.8 (19.8)	−6.3 (20.7)	−1.6 (29.1)	4.6 (40.3)	10.5 (50.9)	15.0 (59.0)	18.1 (64.6)	17.3 (63.1)	12.2 (54.0)	6.1 (43.0)	0.9 (33.6)	−4.0 (24.8)	5.5 (41.9)
Record low °C (°F)	−34.0 (−29.2)	−36.5 (−33.7)	−29.5 (−21.1)	−9.8 (14.4)	−2.9 (26.8)	4.0 (39.2)	6.4 (43.5)	2.9 (37.2)	−3.6 (25.5)	−11.1 (12.0)	−33.0 (−27.4)	−29.7 (−21.5)	−36.5 (−33.7)
Average precipitation mm (inches)	20 (0.8)	18 (0.7)	22 (0.9)	34 (1.3)	45 (1.8)	54 (2.1)	45 (1.8)	38 (1.5)	29 (1.1)	29 (1.1)	25 (1.0)	25 (1.0)	384 (15.1)
Mean monthly sunshine hours	60	79	121	198	272	300	318	304	232	143	66	43	2,136
Source: Climatebase.ru

== Military ==
Budyonnovsk air base of the Russian Aerospace Forces is located 14 km (8.7 miles) northwest of the town.

== Religion ==
Three Armenian churches were torn down by Soviet authorities during the Soviet period. On July 1, 2010, a new Holy Ascension Armenian apostolic church was opened in Budyonnovsk.

== Notable people ==
- Mikhail Markosov, Armenian-Russian former football player
