= Georgiyevsky District =

Georgiyevsky District Георгиевский район
- District
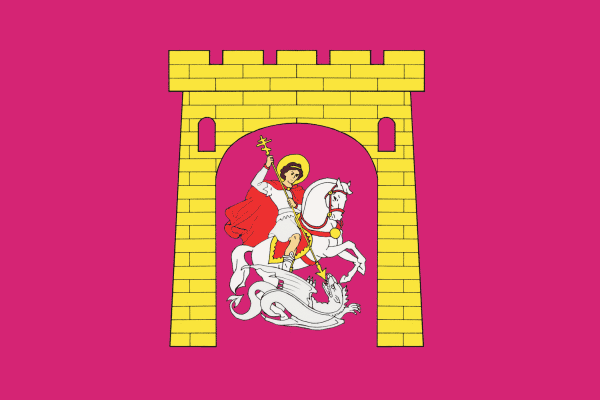
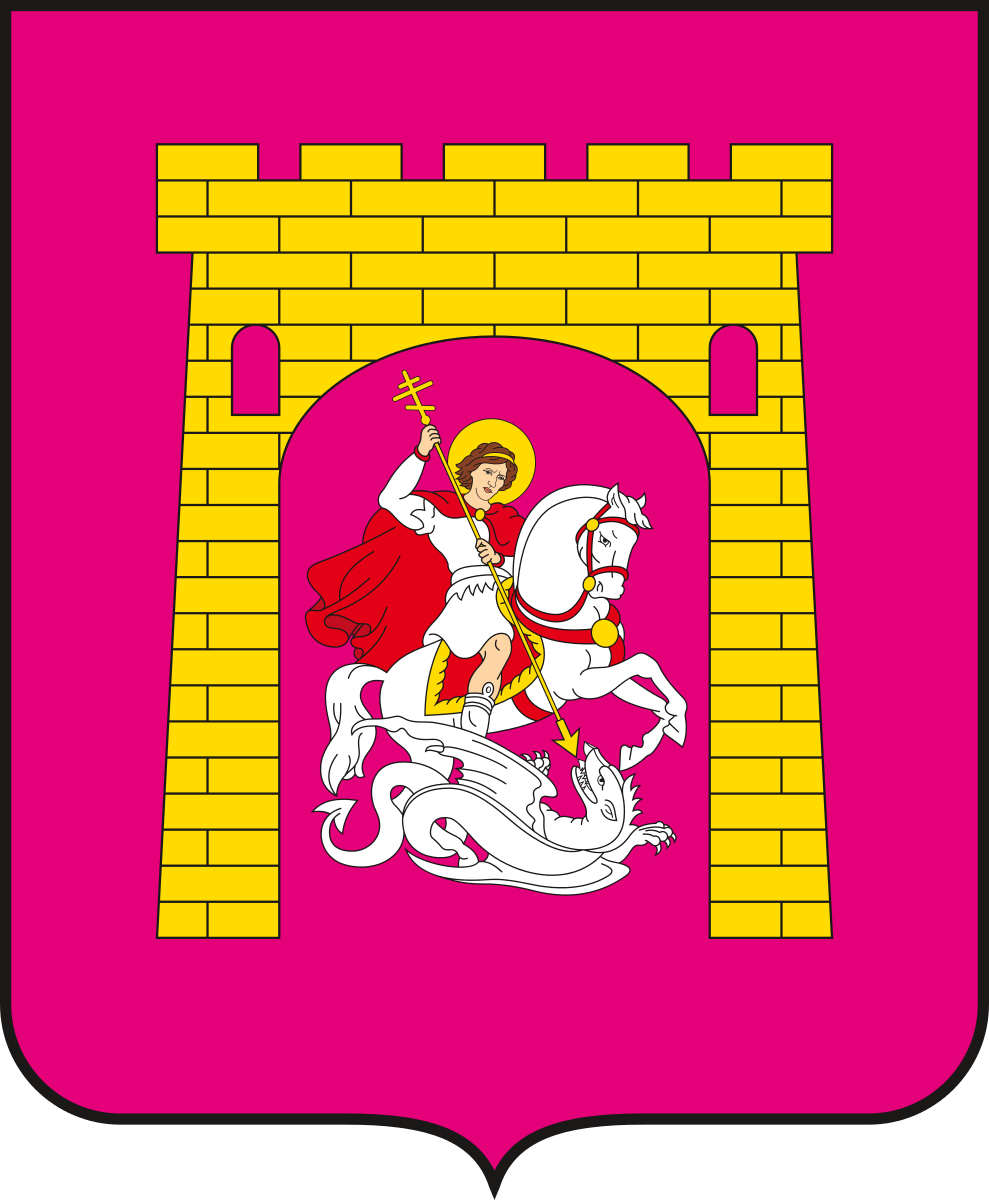
- Flag Coat of arms
- Location of Georgiyevsky District in Stavropol Krai
- Coordinates: 44°09′N 43°28′E
- Country: Russia
- Federal subject: Stavropol Krai
- Established: 1924
- Administrative center: Georgiyevsk

Area
  - Total: 1,920 km^{2} (740 sq mi)

Population (2010 Census)
  - Total: 101,367
  - Density: 52.8/km^{2} (137/sq mi)
  - Urban: 0%
  - Rural: 100%

Administrative structure
  - Administrative divisions: 7 Selsoviets
  - Inhabited localities: 24 rural localities

Municipal structure
  - Municipally incorporated as: Georgiyevsky Municipal District
  - Municipal divisions: 0 urban settlements, 14 rural settlements
- Time zone: UTC+3 (MSK)
- OKTMO ID: 07615000
- Website: http://www.gmr-sk.ru

Coat of arms of Georgievsky municipal district

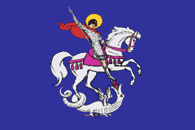
Flag of Georgievsky municipal district

Georgiyevsky District (Russian: Гео́ргиевский райо́н) is an administrative district (raion), one of the twenty-six in Stavropol Krai, Russia. It is located in the south of the krai. The area of the district is 1,920 square kilometers (740 sq mi). Its administrative center is the town of Georgiyevsk (which is not administratively a part of the district). Population: 101,367 (2010 Census); 91,371 (2002 Census); 64,965 (1989 Census).

== Administrative and municipal status ==
Within the framework of administrative divisions, Georgiyevsky District is one of the twenty-six in the krai. The town of Georgiyevsk serves as its administrative center, despite being incorporated separately as a town of krai significance—an administrative unit with the status equal to that of the districts.

As a municipal division, the district is incorporated as Georgiyevsky Municipal District. The town of krai significance of Georgiyevsk is incorporated separately from the district as Georgiyevsk Urban Okrug.
