= Levokumsky District =

Levokumsky District Левокумский район
- District
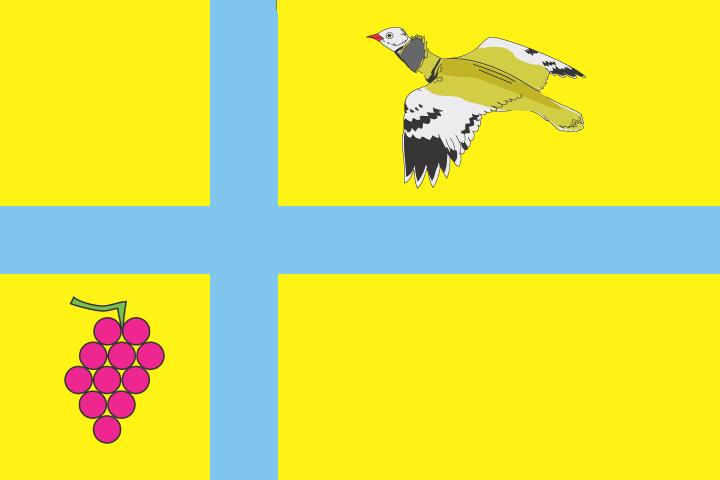
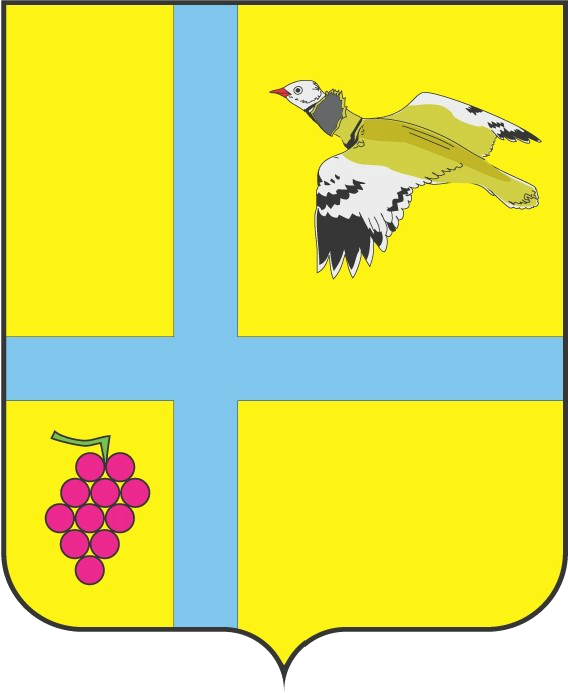
- Flag Coat of arms
- Location of Levokumsky District in Stavropol Krai
- Coordinates: 44°49′N 44°40′E
- Country: Russia
- Federal subject: Stavropol Krai
- Established: 1924
- Administrative center: Levokumskoye

Area
  - Total: 4,687 km^{2} (1,810 sq mi)

Population (2010 Census)
  - Total: 41,499
  - Density: 8.854/km^{2} (22.93/sq mi)
  - Urban: 0%
  - Rural: 100%

Administrative structure
  - Administrative divisions: 6 Selsoviets
  - Inhabited localities: 21 rural localities

Municipal structure
  - Municipally incorporated as: Levokumsky Municipal District
  - Municipal divisions: 0 urban settlements, 11 rural settlements
- Time zone: UTC+3 (MSK)
- OKTMO ID: 07636000
- Website: http://www.adminlmr.ru

Levokumsky District (Russian: Левоку́мский райо́н) is an administrative district (raion), one of the twenty-six in Stavropol Krai, Russia. Municipally, it is incorporated as Levokumsky Municipal District. It is located in the northeast of the krai. The area of the district is 4,687 square kilometers (1,810 sq mi). Its administrative center is the rural locality (a selo) of Levokumskoye. Population: 41,499 (2010 Census); 44,167 (2002 Census); 42,369 (1989 Census). The population of Levokumskoye accounts for 24.8% of the district's total population.
