= Flag of the Russian Soviet Federative Socialist Republic =

Russian Soviet Federative Socialist Republic
- Use: Civil and state flag, civil and state ensign
- Proportion: 1∶2
- Adopted: 9 January 1954
- Relinquished: 22 August 1991 (de facto); 1 November 1991 (de jure)
- Design: A red flag with a light-blue stripe at the pole, with a gold-bordered red star and a hammer and sickle.
- Designed by: Valentin Petrovich Viktorov
- Reverse flag
- Use: Civil and state flag, civil and state ensign
- Flag of the Russian SFSR (1991) and the Russian Federation (1991–1993)
- Use: Civil and state flag, civil and state ensign
- Proportion: 1:2
- Adopted: 22 August 1991 (de facto); 1 November 1991 (de jure)
- Relinquished: 11 December 1993
- Design: A horizontal tricolour of white, blue, and red.
- Designed by: Peter the Great

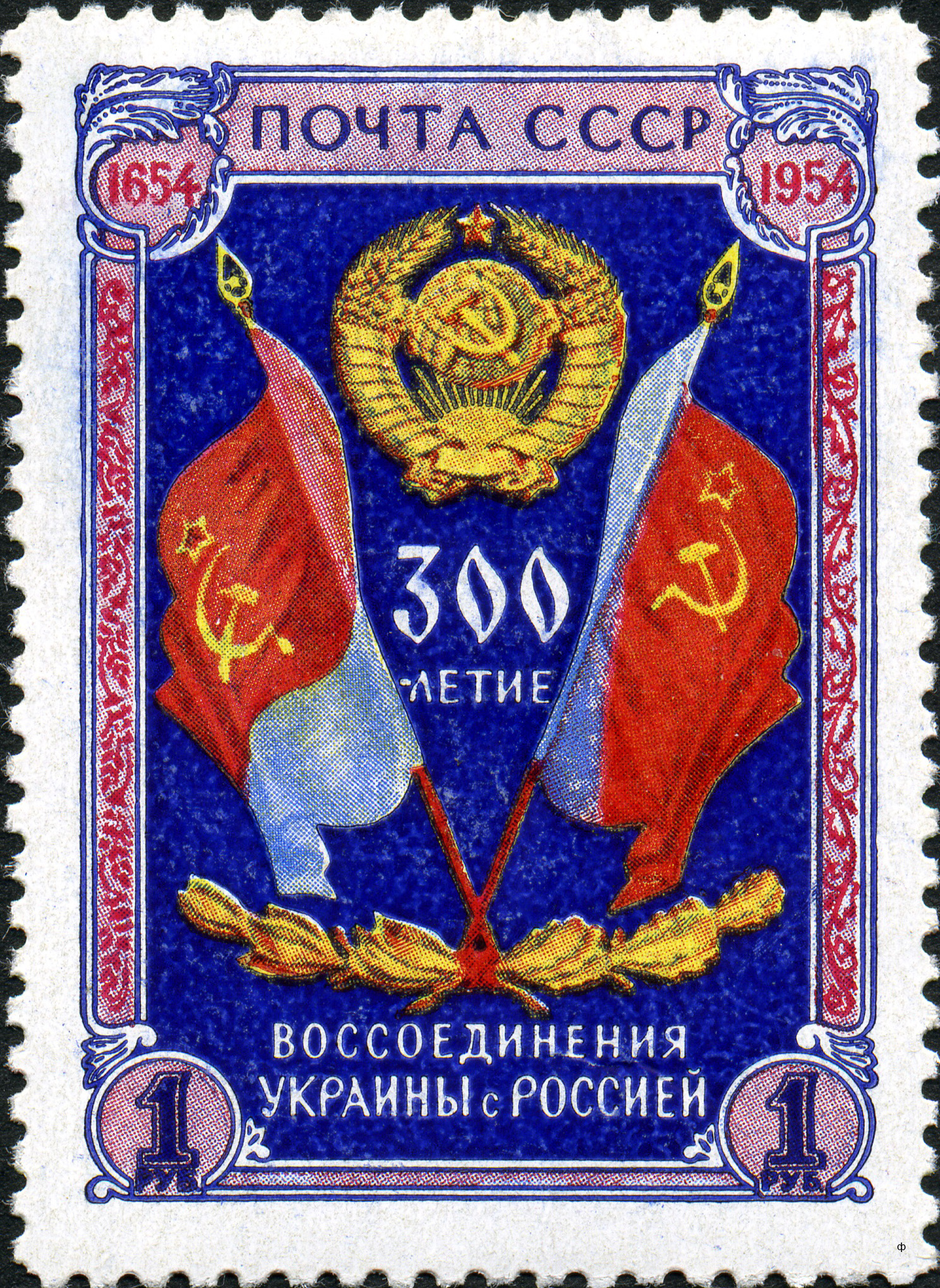
Flag of the Russian SFSR (right) on a 1954 stamp with the flag of the Ukrainian SSR (left). The stamp celebrates the 300th anniversary of the reunification of Ukraine with Russia.

The penultimate USSR-era flag was adopted by the Russian Soviet Federative Socialist Republic (RSFSR) in 1954 and used until 1991. The flag of the Russian SFSR was a defacement of the flag of the USSR. The constitution stipulated that:

The state flag of the Russian Soviet Federative Socialist Republic (SFSR) presents itself as a red rectangular sheet with a light-blue stripe at the pole extending all the width [read height] which constitutes one eighth length of the flag with the golden hammer and sickle and gold-bordered star on the canton.

The symbol of the hammer and sickle represented the working class; more specifically, the hammer represented the urban industrial workers and the sickle represented the rural and agricultural peasants. The red star represented the Communist Party and Communism. The red of the flag represented revolution in general and the Russian Revolution in particular. The blue stripe symbolized the wide Russian skies and the waters of its seas and rivers.

== History ==
During the October Revolution in 1917, the plain red flag was used by the Bolsheviks.

The first flag of the Russian SFSR, adopted on 13 April 1918, was a flag showing the full name of the recently created Soviet republic before the then imminent Russian spelling reform. Its ratio was unspecified.

From June 1918, the flag was red with the gold Cyrillic characters РСФСР (RSFSR) in the top-left corner, in a traditional Vyaz' style of ornamental Cyrillic calligraphy.

From 1920, the characters were redesigned as described by the Russian Constitution of 1925. However, this flag was oftentimes not used, with the 1918 flag being used until 1937.

Flag of the Russian SFSR that was used during the October Revolution

Flag of the Russian SFSR (13 April 1918)

Flag of the Russian SFSR (17 June 1918 – 21 January 1937)

Early variant of the flag of the Russian SFSR, approved on 10 July 1918

Flag of the Russian SFSR (21 January 1937 – 9 January 1954)

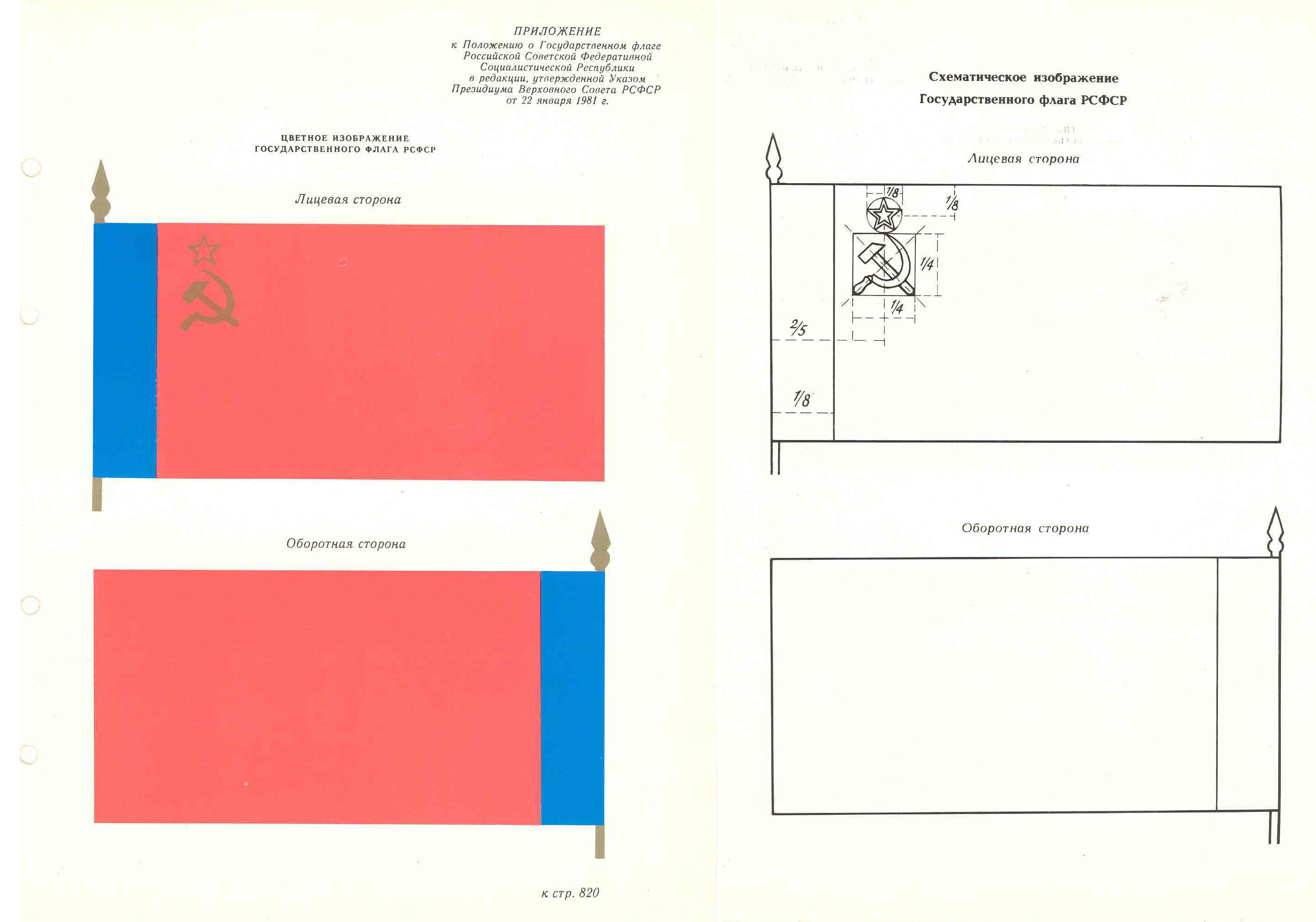
Detailed construction sheet for the Russian SFSR flag issued on 22 January 1981.

In February 1947, the Presidium of the Supreme Soviet of the USSR issued a resolution urging the Soviet republics to adopt new flags. The design was suggested to be based on the state flag of the USSR, as to indicate the idea of the republic within the union, and to include colors and national ornaments to express the geographical, national, historical and cultural characteristics of each republic. In the Russian SFSR, the chairman of the Secretary of the Presidium of the Supreme Soviet Peter Bakhmurov opened the first meeting a month later in March to redesign the national flag.

On 9 January 1954, the new national flag of the RSFSR was approved by the Decree of the Presidium of the Supreme Soviet of the RSFSR. The flag was designed by artist Valentin Petrovich Viktorov. On 2 June 1954, the description of the flag was included in the Constitution of the RSFSR.

After the attempted coup of 1991, Boris Yeltsin, the president of the Russian SFSR adopted a resolution that the imperial tricolor flag of the Russian Empire would be the flag of RSFSR. On 22 August 1991 the Supreme Soviet of the RSFSR decided:

Prior to the establishment of the new state symbol of the Russian Federation, the historical flag of Russia – the flag with equal horizontal white, azure, scarlet stripes should be regarded as the official national flag of the Russian Federation.

It was first hoisted at 12:00 pm on 22 August 1991 at the White House. A tricolor with the hammer and sickle on the centre was also later proposed.

On 1 November 1991, the Constitution of the RSFSR was amended to adopt the white-azure-scarlet flag as the official national flag.

Flag of the Russian SFSR (9 January 1954 – 22 August/1 November 1991)

Dark blue variant of the flag of the Russian SFSR (9 January 1954 – 22 August/1 November 1991)

Flag of the Russian SFSR (22 August/1 November 1991 – 25 December 1991), Russian Federation (until 11 December 1993)

=== Proposed flag of the Russian SFSR ===
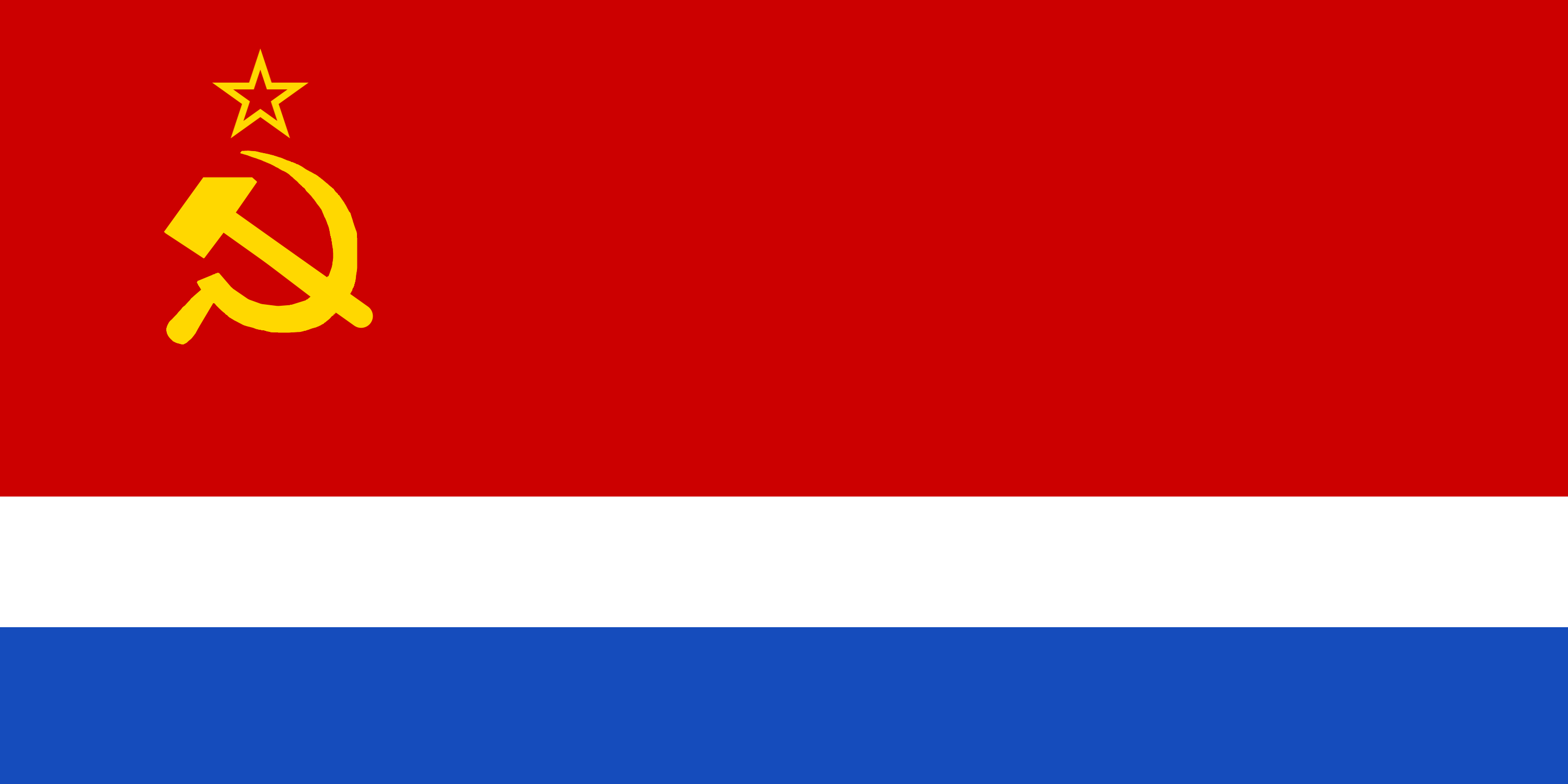
1948 Alexey Kokorekin's proposal

Another proposal with the tricolour at the bottom

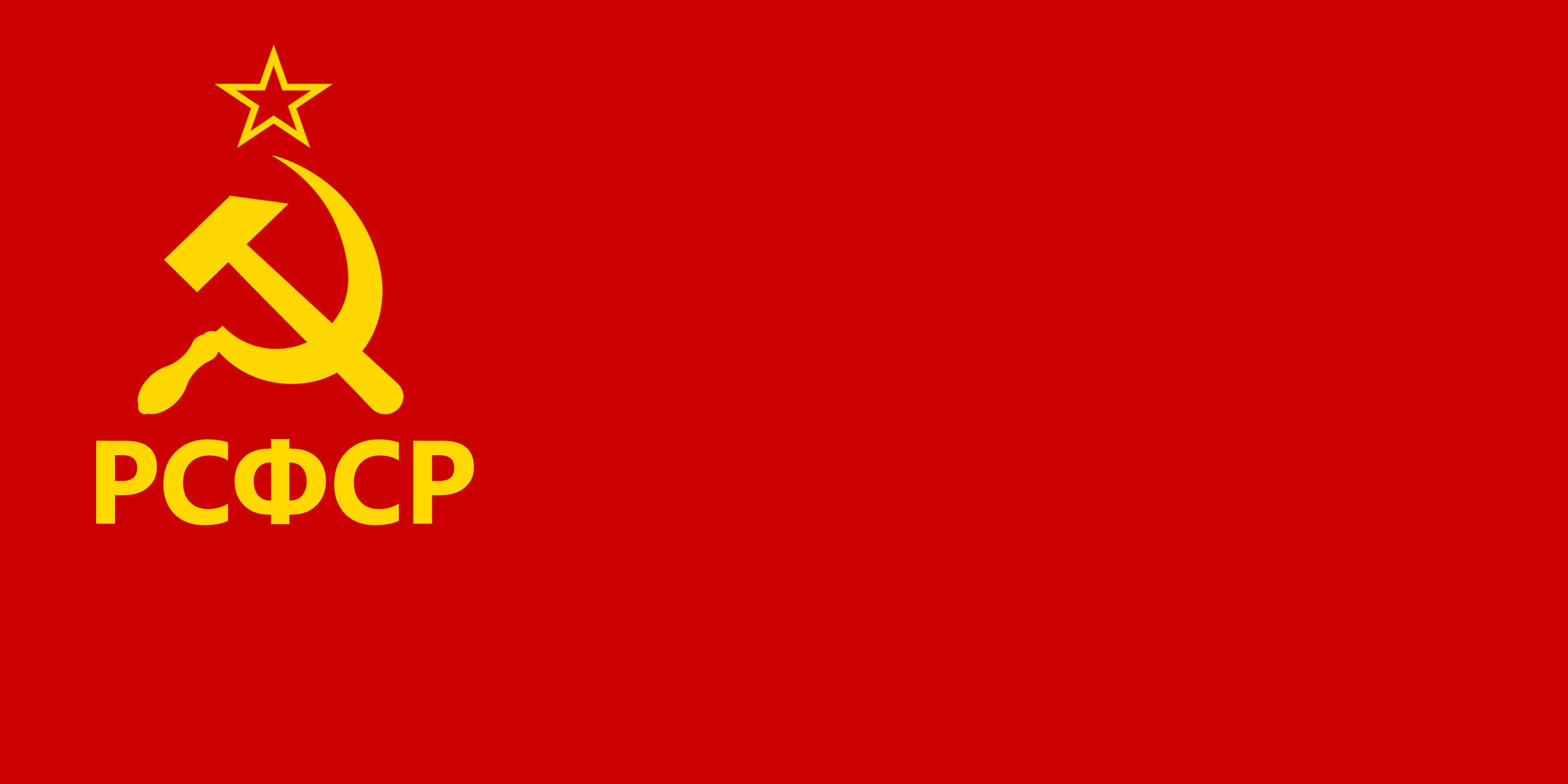
A proposal with gold Cyrillic characters РСФСР

Mikhail Rodionov's 1950 proposal

Since the first meeting for creating a new national flag of the RFSFR in March 1947, some proposals were sent to the authority. The graphic artist Alexey Kokorekin create a proposal to add white and blue horizontal stripes at the bottom, both two stripes took 1/6 of the flag's height. His proposal was submitted to the Secretary of the Presidium of the Supreme Soviet of the USSR Alexander Gorkin in June 1948 and again to the Chairman of the Council of Ministers of the RSFSR Boris Chernousov in December 1949, but was not approved.

Mikhail Rodionov also created another proposal for the state flag of the RSFSR. It consisted of a traditional tricolour flag and a hammer and a sickle in the middle of the flag. Because of his proposal, he was accused of nationalism and anti-Sovietism in 1950, at the Leningrad affair case.

== Other Russian SFSR flags ==
The banner of the republic was a 1:1 ratio red flag with gold fringe, commonly used in ceremonies. The banner was also used for the first inauguration of Boris Yeltsin as President of the Russian SFSR on 10 July 1991.

Banner of the Russian SFSR (1991)

Naval Ensign of Russian SFSR (1920–1923)

Civil ensign of the Russian SFSR (1920–1924)

== Colour scheme ==
Colors scheme	Blue	Red	Yellow
Pantone	2925 C	2035 C	Medium Yellow C
CMYK	100-42-0-2	0-100-100-20	0-16-100-0
HEX	#0091FA	#CD0000	#FFD700
RGB	0-145-250	205-0-0	255-215-0

Colors scheme	Blue	Red	Yellow
CMYK	100-68-0-39	0-100-100-19	0-15-100-0
HEX	#00309A	#CE0000	#FFD800
RGB	0-48-154	206-0-0	255-216-0

Colors scheme	White	Azure	Scarlet
RAL	9016	5012	3020
CMYK	0-0-0-0	100-39-0-9	0-94-85-14
HTML	#FFFFFF	#018DE9	#DB0D20
RGB	255-255-255	1-141-233	219-13-32

== Regional flags based on the flag of RSFSR ==
=== Flags of the Autonomous Soviet Socialist Republics ===
Flags of the Autonomous Soviet Socialist Republics of RSFSR were defacements of the 1954 flag of RSFSR, with texts or acronyms of the name of the republic in official languages.

Flag of the Bashkir ASSR (1954–1992)

Flag of the Buryat ASSR (1978–1990)

Flag of the Dagestan ASSR (1954–1991)

Flag of the Kabardino-Balkarian ASSR (1978–1991)

Flag of the Kalmyk ASSR (1958–1990)

Flag of the Karelian ASSR (1978–1991)

Flag of the Komi ASSR (1954–1991)

Flag of the Mari ASSR (1978–1990)

Flag of the Mordovian ASSR (1954–1990)

Flag of the North Ossetian ASSR (1978–1991)

Flag of the Tatar ASSR (1978–1991)

Flag of the Tuvan ASSR (1978–1990)

Flag of the Udmurt ASSR (1978–1991)

Flag of the Checheno-Ingush ASSR (1978–1990)

Flag of the Chuvash ASSR (1978–1990)

Flag of the Yakut ASSR (1978–1990)

=== Flags of the post-1990 Russian regional flags based on the flag of RSFSR ===
Since various ASSRs have successively declared sovereignty in 1990, all twelve ASSRs of the RSFSR have minor changed the words "ASSR" in the flags to the words "SSR". The only exceptions are the four ASSRs of Bashkir, Komi, North Ossetian and Tatar. They did not make any modifications to the ASSR flags originally based on the RSFSR flag until they were replaced with the post-Soviet new flags.

Flag of Altai Krai
(2000–present)

Flag of the Buryat SSR (8 October 1990–27 March 1992) and the Republic of Buryatia (27 March–29 October 1992)

Flag of the Checheno-Ingush SSR (27 November 1990–16 May 1992)

Flag of the Chuvash SSR (24 October 1990–13 February 1992) and the Chuvash Republic (13 February–29 April 1992)

Flag of the Dagestan SSR (1991–1992) and the Republic of Dagestan (1992–1994)

Flag of the Kabardino-Balkarian SSR (1991–1992) and the Kabardino-Balkarian Republic (1992–1994)

Flag of the Kalmyk SSR (18 October 1990–20 February 1992) and the Republic of Kalmykia (20 February–30 October 1992)

Flag of the Karelian SSR (24 May–13 November 1991) and the Republic of Karelia (13 November 1991–16 February 1993)

Flag of Kemerovo Oblast (2002–2003)

Flag of Kemerovo Oblast (2003–2020)

Flag of Kemerovo Oblast (2020–present)

Flag of Kostroma Oblast (2000–2006)

Flag of the Mari SSR (22 October 1990–3 September 1992)

Flag of the Mordovian SSR (1990–1993) and the Republic of Mordovia (1993–1995)

Flag of Oryol
(1998–present)

Flag of the Yakut SSR (27 September 1990–21 April 1992) and the Sakha Republic (21 April–14 October 1992)

Flag of the Tuvan SSR (12 December 1990–31 March 1992) and the Republic of Tuva (31 March–17 September 1992)

Flag of the Udmurt SSR (1991–1992) and the Udmurt Republic (1992–1993)

Flag of Vladimir Oblast (1999–2017)

Flag of Vladimir Oblast (2017–present)

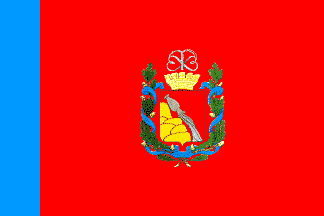
Flag of Voronezh Oblast (1997–2005)

== See also ==
- Flag of the Soviet Union
- Emblem of the Russian SFSR
- Flag of Russia
- List of Russian flags
- Defacement (flag)
