= Elmen (surname) =

Elmen is a surname. It may be a transliteration of the Chuvash surname Russian: Элмен. Notable people with the surname include:

- Daniel Elmen (1885–1932), Chuvash politician
- Gustav Waldemar Elmen, American engineer
- Ulkka Elmen (born 1961), Chuvash writer

== See also ==
- Emlen
- Elman
