= Chuvash Regional Committee of the Communist Party of the Soviet Union =

The First Secretary of the Chuvash regional branch of the Communist Party of the Soviet Union was the position of highest authority in the Chuvash AO (1920–1925) and the Chuvash ASSR (1925–1991) in the Russian SFSR of the Soviet Union. The position was created on 8 October 1920, and abolished in August 1991. The First Secretary was a de facto appointed position usually by the Politburo or the General Secretary himself.

== List of First Secretaries of the Chuvash Communist Party ==
Name	Term of Office		Life years
Name	Start	End	Life years
First Secretaries of the Communist Party
Daniel Elmen	8 October 1920	25 February 1921	1885–1932
Georgy Savandeyev	1 March 1921	19 October 1921	1889–1949
Anton Lastochkin	22 October 1921	15 March 1922	1892–1968
Gavriil Mikhaylov	15 March 1922	12 October 1922	1895–1967
Daniil Elmen	15 October 1922	10 May 1924	1885–1932
Mikhail Tomasov	15 May 1924	22 October 1925	1896–1978
Vasily Alekseyev	23 October 1925	22 November 1926	1893–1970
Sergey Petrov	22 November 1926	14 November 1937	1889–1942
Gerasim Ivanov	14 November 1937	17 September 1938	1905–1938
Aleksey Volkov (Note: Acting to October 1, 1938)	17 September 1938	4 March 1940	1890–1942
Ivan Charykov	4 March 1940	2 December 1948	1902–1965
Timofey Akhazov	2 December 1948	14 November 1955	1907–1979
Semyon Islyukov	14 November 1955	4 January 1968	1915–1998
Nikolay Voronovsky	4 January 1968	28 November 1973	1914–1973
Ilya Prokopyev	14 January 1974	25 October 1988	1926–2017
Aleksandr Petrov	25 October 1988	2 June 1990	1933–
Valentin Shurchanov	2 June 1990	August 1991	1947–2020

== See also ==
- Chuvash Autonomous Oblast
- Chuvash Autonomous Soviet Socialist Republic

== Sources ==
- World Statesmen.org
