= Flag of the Kabardino-Balkarian Autonomous Soviet Socialist Republic =

Soviet regional flag

Kabardino-Balkarian Autonomous Soviet Socialist Republic Kabardin Autonomous Soviet Socialist Republic (1944-1957)
- Flag of the Kabardino-Balkarian ASSR (1978–1991)
- Use: Civil and state flag
- Proportion: 1:2
- Adopted: 29 March 1957; 26 May 1978 (minor changes)
- Design: A red flag with a light-blue stripe at the pole, with golden red star and hammer and sickle.
- Designed by: Valentin Petrovich Viktorov

The flag of the Kabardino-Balkarian Autonomous Soviet Socialist Republic was adopted in 1957 by the government of the Kabardino-Balkarian Autonomous Soviet Socialist Republic. The flag is identical to the flag of the Russian Soviet Federative Socialist Republic.

== History ==
=== First version ===
The first constitution of the Kabardino-Balkarian ASSR was adopted by the Extraordinary 10th Congress of Soviets of the Kabardino-Balkarian ASSR on June 24, 1937, and was approved on June 2, 1940, by the Supreme Soviet of the RSFSR. Article 112 of the constitution described the flag of the Kabardino-Balkarian ASSR:

The state flag of the Kabardino-Balkarian Autonomous Soviet Socialist Republic is the national flag of the RSFSR, consisting of a red cloth, in the left corner of which, at the top of the pole, are placed the golden letters "RSFSR" in Russian, Kabardin and Balkar languages, and under it the inscription "Kabardino-Balkarian ASSR" in Russian, Kabardin and Balkar languages.

— Constitution of the Kabardino-Balkarian ASSR (1937), Article 112

==== Revision ====
On July 26, 1938, the inscriptions on the flag underwent minor changes. The Balkar language writing system was changed into Cyrillic letters, and the name of the republic was changed in Kabardin language.

=== Second version (as the Kabardin ASSR) ===
In 1944, the Balkar people were accused of aiding the Nazis, and almost all of the entire population was deported. The word "Balkar" was removed from the name of the republic. The flag of the Kabardin ASSR was a red cloth with gold inscriptions "RSFSR" and "Kabardian ASSR" (in Russian and Kabardin languages). The flag was described in Article 112 of the 1945 Constitution of the Kabardin ASSR.

The state flag of the Kabardian ASSR is the national flag of the RSFSR, consisting of a red cloth, in the left corner of which, at the top of the shaft, are the gold letters "RSFSR" in Russian and Kabardian languages, with the letters "Kabardian ASSR" added under the inscription "RSFSR" in Russian and Kabardin languages.

— Constitution of the Kabardin ASSR (1945), Article 112

=== Third version (as the Kabardin ASSR) ===
After the introduction of the new version of the RSFSR flag, the flag of the Kabardin ASSR was changed. On June 15, 1954, the Law on the State Flag of the Kabardin ASSR changed the description of the flag in Article 112 of the Constitution of the Republic.

The state flag of the Kabardin Autonomous Soviet Socialist Republic is the state flag of the RSFSR, consisting of a red cloth with a light blue stripe at the flagpole over the entire width of the flag. The light blue bar is one eighth of the flag's length. In the upper left corner of the red cloth there is a golden sickle and a hammer, and above them is a red five-pointed star, framed by a golden border. Under the hammer and sickle inscription: "KASSR" in Russian and Kabardin languages. The ratio of the width of the flag to its length is 1:2.

— Constitution of the Kabardin ASSR (1945), Article 112, amended in 1954

=== Fourth version (as the Kabardino-Balkarian ASSR) ===
By a decree of January 9, 1957, the Presidium of the Supreme Soviet of the USSR restored the Kabardino-Balkarian Autonomous Soviet Socialist Republic. The law of the Kabardino-Balkarian Autonomous Soviet Socialist Republic of March 29, 1957 established that the abbreviation on the flag of the republic should be performed in three languages.

By the Decree of the PVS of the Kabardino-Balkarian ASSR on September 30, 1966, the Regulation on the Flag of the Kabardino-Balkar Autonomous Soviet Socialist Republic in 1956 was amended.

On November 16, 1971, the Council of Ministers of the Kabardino-Balkarian ASSR, approved the Application of the Regulations on the State Flag of the Kabardino-Balkarian ASSR by Resolution No. 489.

==== Revision ====
According to the new Constitution of the Kabardino-Balkarian ASSR, which was adopted on May 26, 1978, the names of the Kabardino-Balkarian ASSR on flag became the full name of the state (rather than abbreviation). This was confirmed by article 158 of the Constitution of the Kabardino-Balkarian ASSR.

The state flag of the Kabardino-Balkar Autonomous Soviet Socialist Republic is the state flag of the RSFSR, which is a red rectangular cloth with a light blue stripe at the flagpole, which is one eighth of the flag's length. In the upper left corner of the red cloth are the golden sickle and hammer and above them is a red five-pointed star framed with a gold border, and under them is the inscription "Kabardino-Balkarian ASSR" in Russian, Kabardin and Balkarian languages. The ratio of the width of the flag to its length is 1:2.

— Constitution of the Kabardino-Balkarian ASSR (1978), Article 158

By the decree of the Presidium of the Supreme Soviet of the Kabardino-Balkarian ASSR on October 25, 1978, the design of the flag was approved. On September 26, 1979, the PVS of the Kabardino-Balkarian ASSR approved the Regulations on the State Flag of the Kabardino-Balkarian ASSR. The description of the flag in this position was supplemented with a paragraph on the relative sizes of the elements:

The hammer and sickle fit into a square whose side is 1/4 of the flag's width. The sharp end of the sickle falls in the middle of the upper side of the square, the sickle and hammer handles abut the lower corners of the square. The length of the hammer with the handle is 3/4 of the diagonal of the square. The five-pointed star fits circumference with a diameter of 1/8 of the flag's width, touching the upper side of the square. The distance of the vertical axis of the star, sickle and hammer from the shaft is 2/5 of the flag's width. The distance from the upper edge of the flag to the center of the star is 1/8 of the flag's width.

— Regulations on the State Flag of the Kabardino-Balkarian ASSR (1979)

On November 10, 1981, the Council of Ministers adopted a new edition of the Application of the Regulations on the State Flag of the Kabardino-Balkarian ASSR

== Gallery ==
24 June 1937 – 26 July 1938

26 July 1938 – 10 July 1945

10 July 1945 – 15 June 1954 (as the Kabardin ASSR)
15 June 1954 – 29 March 1957 (as the Kabardin ASSR)

29 March 1957 – 26 May 1978

26 May 1978 – 31 January 1991

31 January 1991 (as the Kabardino-Balkarian SSR) - 21 July 1994 (adoption of the Flag of Kabardino-Balkaria)

== See also ==
- Emblem of the Kabardino-Balkarian Autonomous Soviet Socialist Republic
- Flag of Kabardino-Balkaria
- Flag of the Russian Soviet Federative Socialist Republic
