= Flag of Russia =

Russian Federation
- Триколор (lit. 'tricolour')
- Use: Civil and state flag, civil and state ensign
- Proportion: 2:3
- Adopted: 1705–1922: 1705; 321 years ago (for vessels) 1883; 143 years ago (for land use) 1896; 130 years ago (national flag); 1991–present: 22 August 1991; 35 years ago (de facto restored) 1 November 1991; 35 years ago (de jure restored) 11 December 1993; 32 years ago (colours standardised) 25 December 2000; 25 years ago (legalised)
- Design: A horizontal tricolour of white, blue, and red
- Designed by: Peter the Great

The national flag of Russia (Note: Russian: Государственный флаг Российской Федерации, romanised: Gosudarstvenny flag Rossiyskoy Federatsii, lit. 'The State Flag of the Russian Federation') is a tricolour of three equal horizontal bands: white on the top, blue in the middle, and red on the bottom.

The design was first introduced by Tsar Peter the Great in 1693, and in 1705 it was adopted as the civil ensign of the Tsardom of Russia; the flag continued to be used as a civil ensign under the Russian Empire. In 1858, Emperor Alexander II declared the black-yellow-white tricolour as the national flag, and in 1896 it was replaced by the white-blue-red tricolour by Nicholas II. In 1917, following the October Revolution, the Bolsheviks banned the tricolour, though it continued to be flown by the White movement during the Russian Civil War. The flag of the Russian SFSR was a red field with its Cyrillic acronym "РСФСР" in the upper-left corner, and after 1954, was a red field with a vertical blue stripe on the left and a gold hammer and sickle.

Shortly after the August Coup in 1991, the Russian SFSR adopted the imperial tricolour as the national flag of Russia, although with slightly different dimensions and colour shades than the current version. After the dissolution of the Soviet Union at the end of the year, the newly independent Russian Federation inherited the redesigned flag, and its current proportions and shades were specified by President Boris Yeltsin in 1993.

== Origin ==
Two accounts of the flag's origin connect it to the tricolour used by the Dutch Republic (the Statenvlag, later the flag of the Netherlands).

Reconstructed flag of the frigate Oryol (1668), the first Russian naval ship built under Tsar Alexis I of the Tsardom of Russia

The earliest mention of the flag occurs during the reign of Alexis I, in 1668, and is related to the construction of the first Russian naval ship, the frigate Oryol. According to one source, the ship's Dutch lead engineer Butler faced the need for the flag, and issued a request to the Boyar Duma, to "ask His Royal Majesty as to which (as is the custom among other nations) flag shall be raised on the ship". The official response merely indicated that, as such issue is as yet unprecedented, even though the land forces do use (apparently different) flags, the tsar ordered that his (Butler's) opinion be sought about the matter, asking specifically as to the custom existing in his country.

A different account traces the origins of the Russian flag to tsar Peter the Great's visits to Arkhangelsk in 1693 and 1694. Peter was keenly interested in shipbuilding in the European style, different from the barges ordinarily used in Russia at the time. In 1693, Peter had ordered a Dutch-built frigate from Amsterdam. In 1694 when it arrived, the Dutch red, white, and blue banner flew from its stern. Peter decided to model Russia's naval flag after that banner by assigning meaning and reordering the colours.

The Dutch flag book of 1695 by Carel Allard, printed only a year after Peter's trip to Western Europe, describes the tricolour with a double-headed eagle bearing a shield on its breast and wearing a golden crown over both of its heads.

== History ==
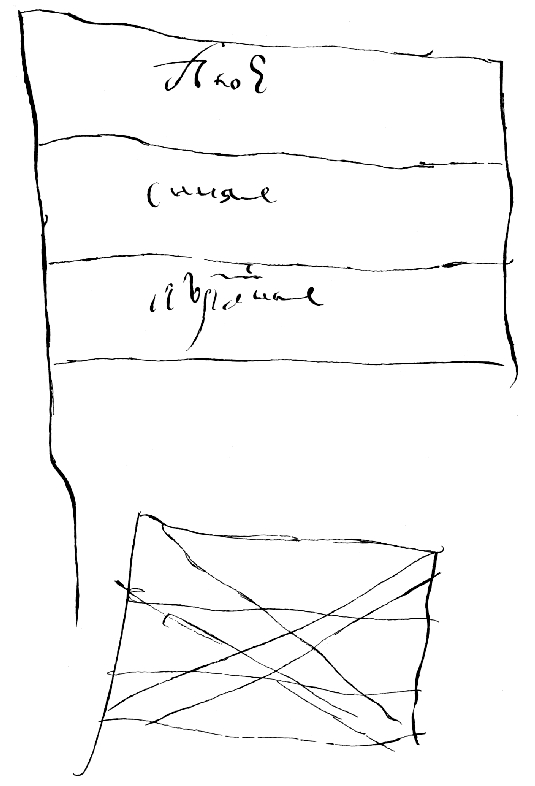
Flag sketches made by
Peter the Great, 1699

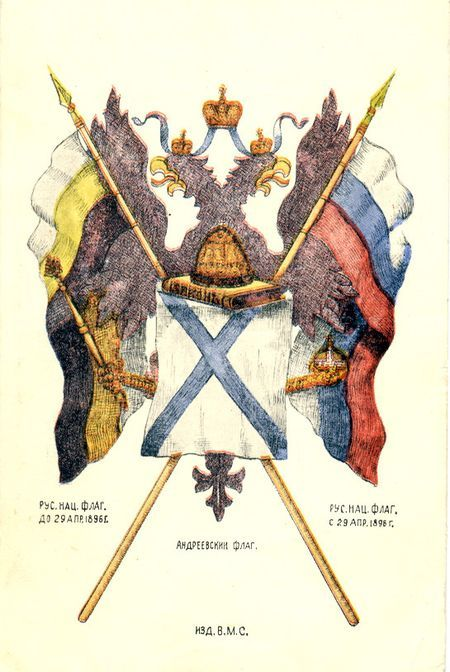
National flags of Russia
before and after 1896

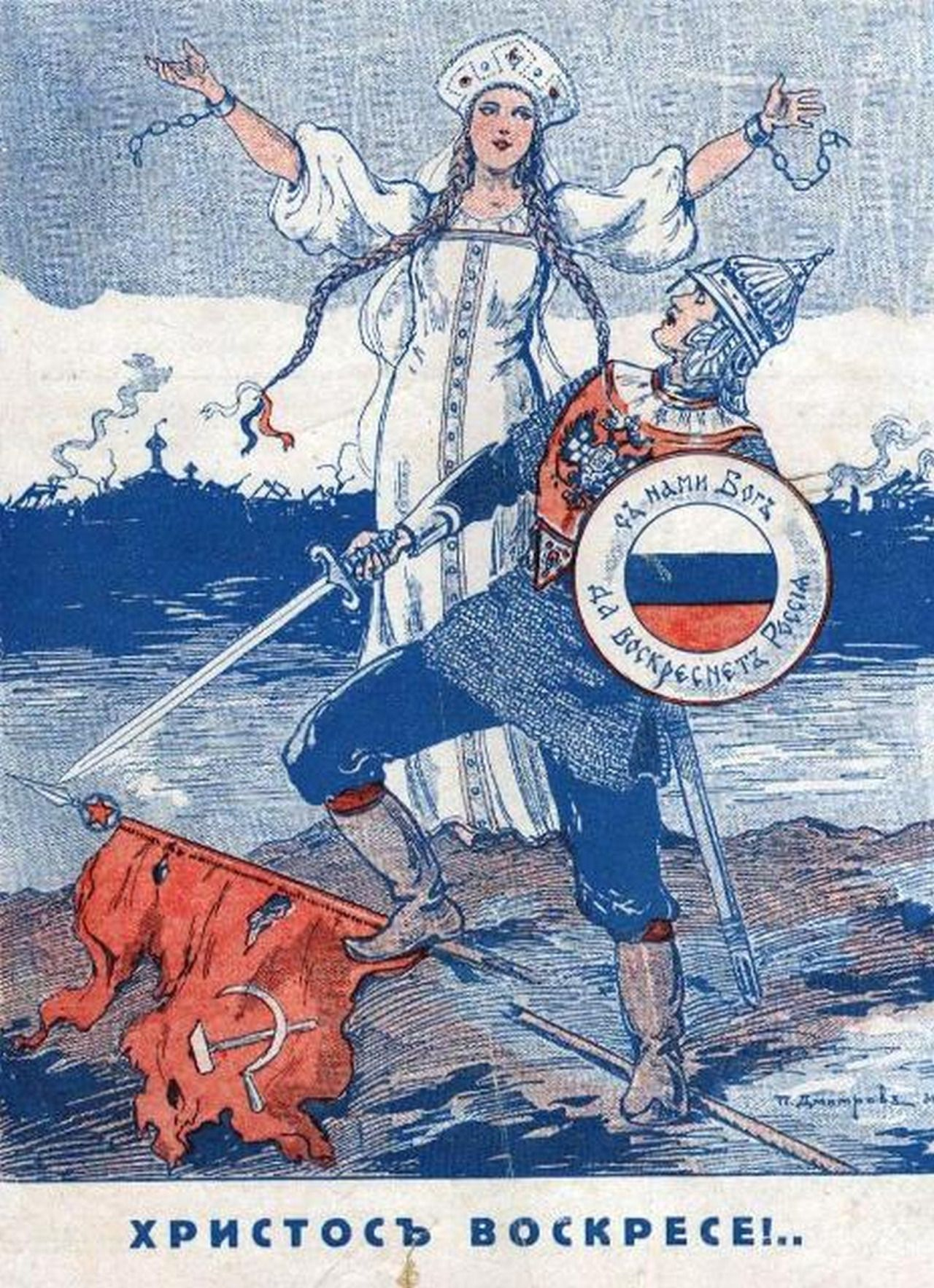
Magazine cover of
white émigré, 1932

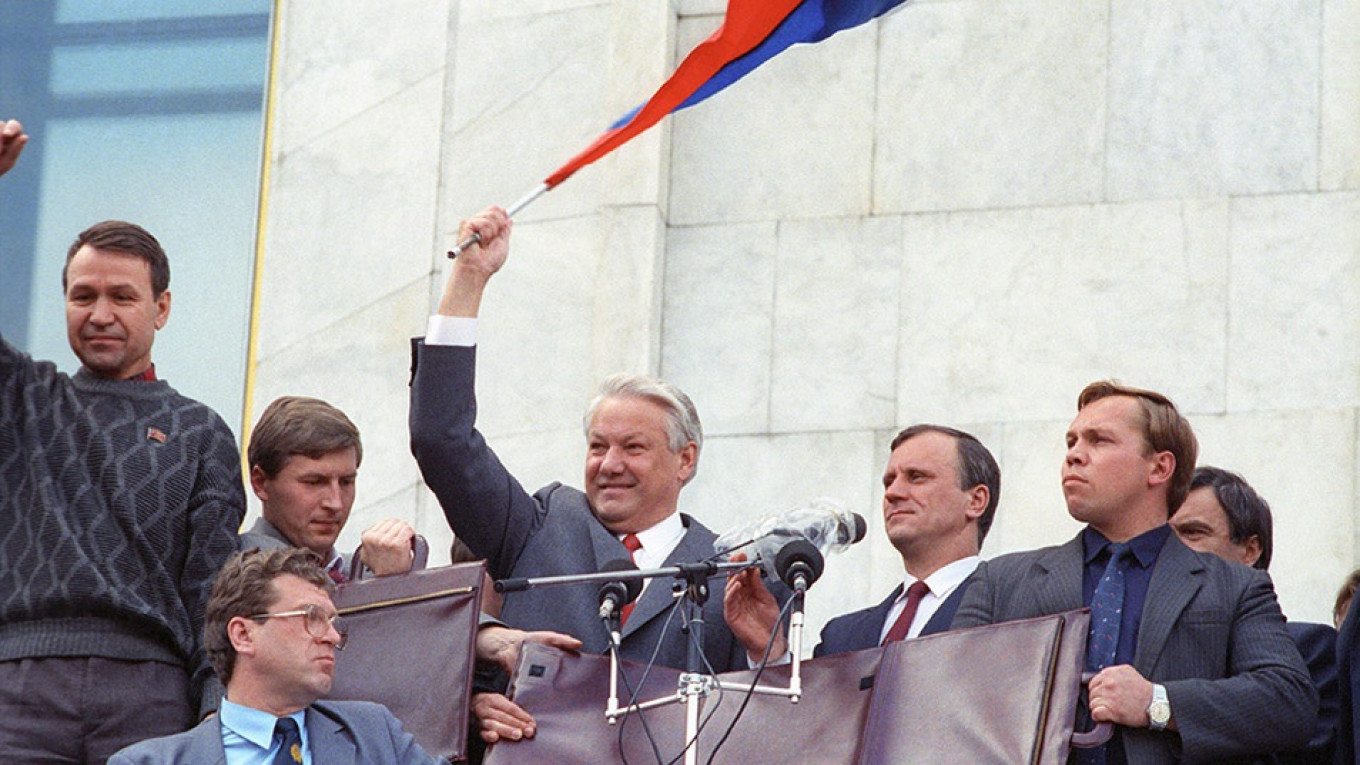
President Boris Yeltsin waving the flag during the August Coup, 1991

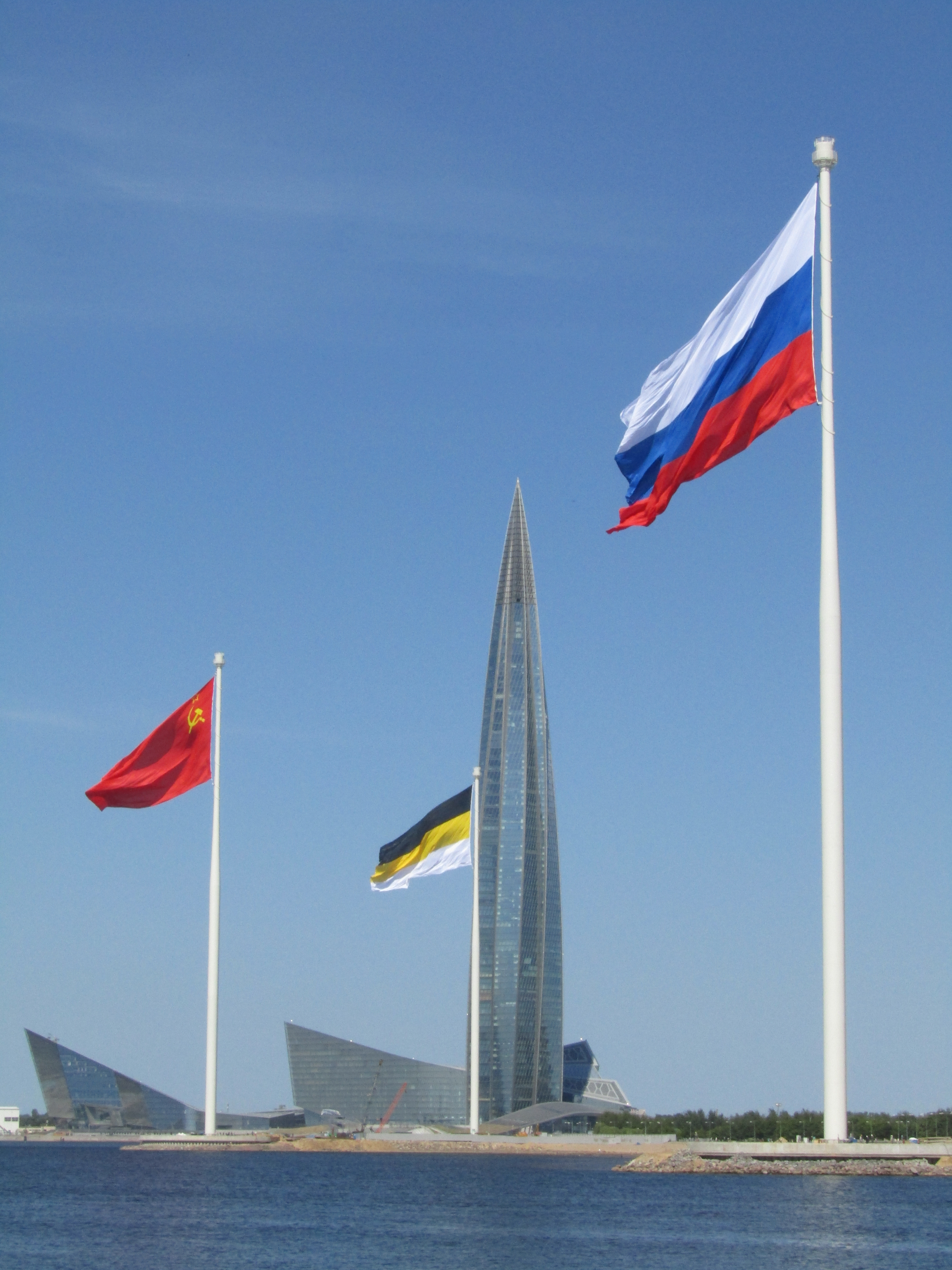
Display in Saint Petersburg in 2023, juxtaposing the white-blue-red tricolour with the prior black-yellow-white flag of the Russian Empire and the flag of the Soviet Union

A study on clarifying the national colours of Russia based on disquisition on documents of the Moscow Archive of the Ministry of Justice of the Russian Empire was summarised by Dmitry Samokvasov, a Russian archaeologist and legal historian, in an edition of 16 pages called "On the Question of National Colours of Ancient Russia" published in Moscow in 1910.

=== 1552–1918: Tsardom, Empire, and Republic ===
Banner of the "Most Gracious Saviour" under Ivan the Terrible

In 1552, Russian regiments marched on the victorious assault of Kazan under Ivan the Terrible with the banner of the Most Gracious Saviour. For the next century and a half, the banner of Ivan the Terrible accompanied the Russian army. Under Tsarina Sophia Alekseevna, it visited the Crimean campaigns, and under Peter the Great, the Azov campaigns and the Russo-Swedish War.

In the Illustrated Chronicle of Ivan the Terrible, there is an image of the banner of Ivan the Terrible in the Kazan campaign – a bifurcated white one with the image of the Saviour and an eight-pointed cross above it. According to other sources, the banner was red instead of white. A copy of this banner, which has been restored many times, is still kept in the Kremlin Armoury.

In 1612, the Nizhny Novgorod militia raised the banner of Dmitry Pozharsky, it was crimson in colour with the image of the Lord Almighty on one side and the archangel Michael on the other.

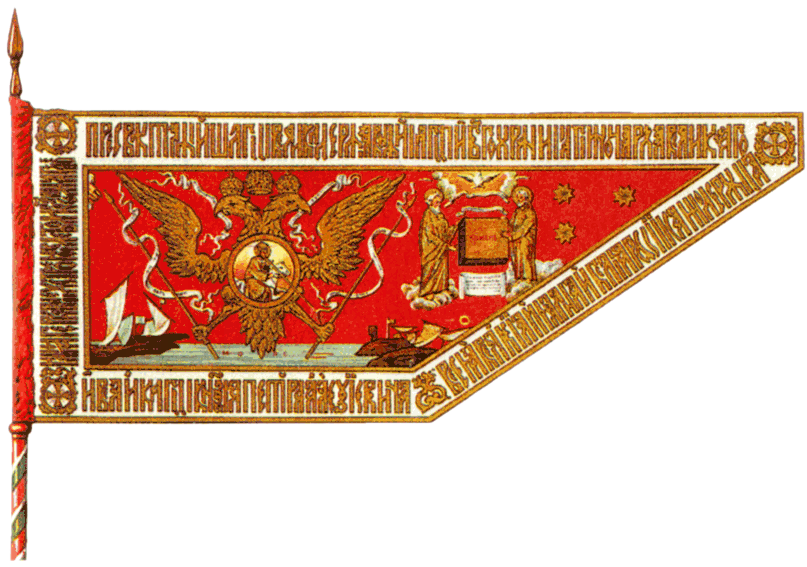
The armorial banner of Peter the Great, 1696

In 1669, the Polish painters Stanislav Loputsky and Ivan Mirovsky invited by Tsar Alexis of Russia, painted for the tsar's palace in Kolomenskoye "the hallmarks (that is, the emblems) of the sovereigns and all the universal states of this world." Then Loputsky drew "on the canvas, the coat of arms of the Moscow State and the arms of other neighbouring countries, under every emblem of the planet under which they are." The coat of arms was a white rectangular banner with a "slope" and a wide red border, in the centre of which was depicted a gold two-headed eagle and the emblems symbolising the subject kingdoms, principalities and lands. In the inventory of the Kremlin Armoury, the coat of arms is described as the following: "In the circle there is a two-headed eagle wearing two crowns, and in his chest, the king on horseback pricks a serpent with his spear".

On 6 August 1693, during Peter the Great's sailing in the White Sea with a detachment of warships built in Arkhangelsk, the so-called "Flag of the Tsar of Muscovy" was raised for the first time on the 12-gun yacht "Saint Peter". The flag was a cross-stitch of 4.6 × 4.9 metres sewn from cloth, composed of three equal-sized horizontal stripes of white, blue and red, with a golden double-headed eagle in the middle. The original of this oldest surviving Russian flag is located in the Central Naval Museum in Saint Petersburg.

A 1695 flag book by Carel Allard describes three flags used by the tsar of Muscovy: the tricolour with the double-headed eagle bearing a shield on its breast and wearing a golden crown over both of its heads, the same tricolour with a blue saltire over it, and a cross flag showing red and white quartering with a blue cross over all. The cross flag is depicted upon the Construction of Kronschloss Medal, which commemorates the construction of Fort Kronschlot (Kronschloss) in Kronstadt by Peter the Great in 1704, the colours of the flag being determined according to the hatchings engraved.

The armorial banner of Peter the Great was created in 1696. Made from red taffeta with a white border, the flag depicted a golden eagle hovering over the sea. On the chest of the eagle in the circle is the Saviour, next to the Holy Spirit and the Holy Apostles Peter and Paul. The banner was likely made for the second Azov campaign.

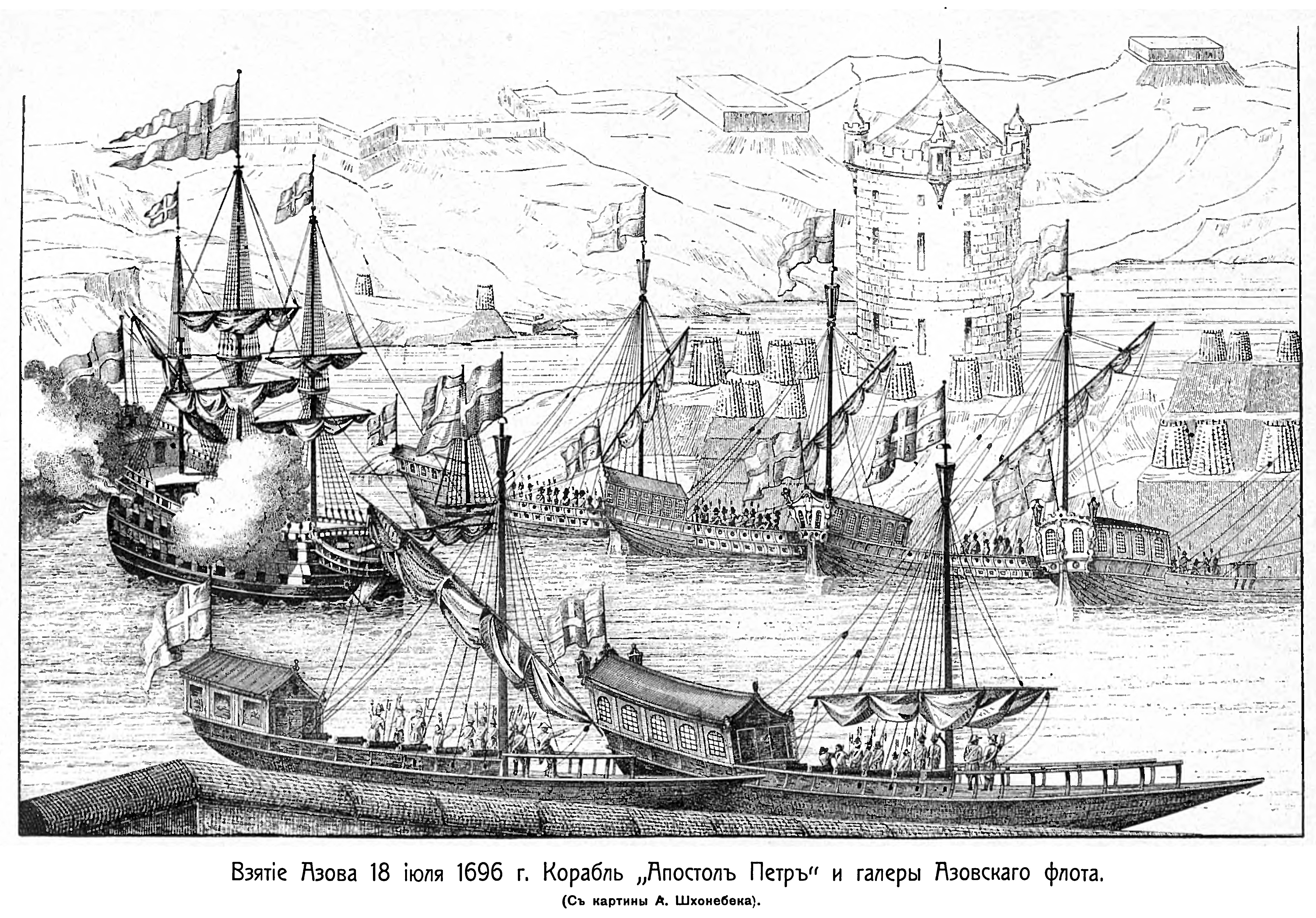
Taking the fortress of Azov. 1696 by Adrian Shkhonebek

In 1693, Franz Timmerman received the order to build merchant ships in Arkhangelsk and trade with Europe. He was told to display the two-headed eagle spread with wings, with three crowns over it. On the chest of the eagle, a warrior on horseback was to be displayed with a spear, in a military harness. The same eagle was also to hold a sceptre with the right leg and an apple with a crest with the left. The same instructions were given to other traders.

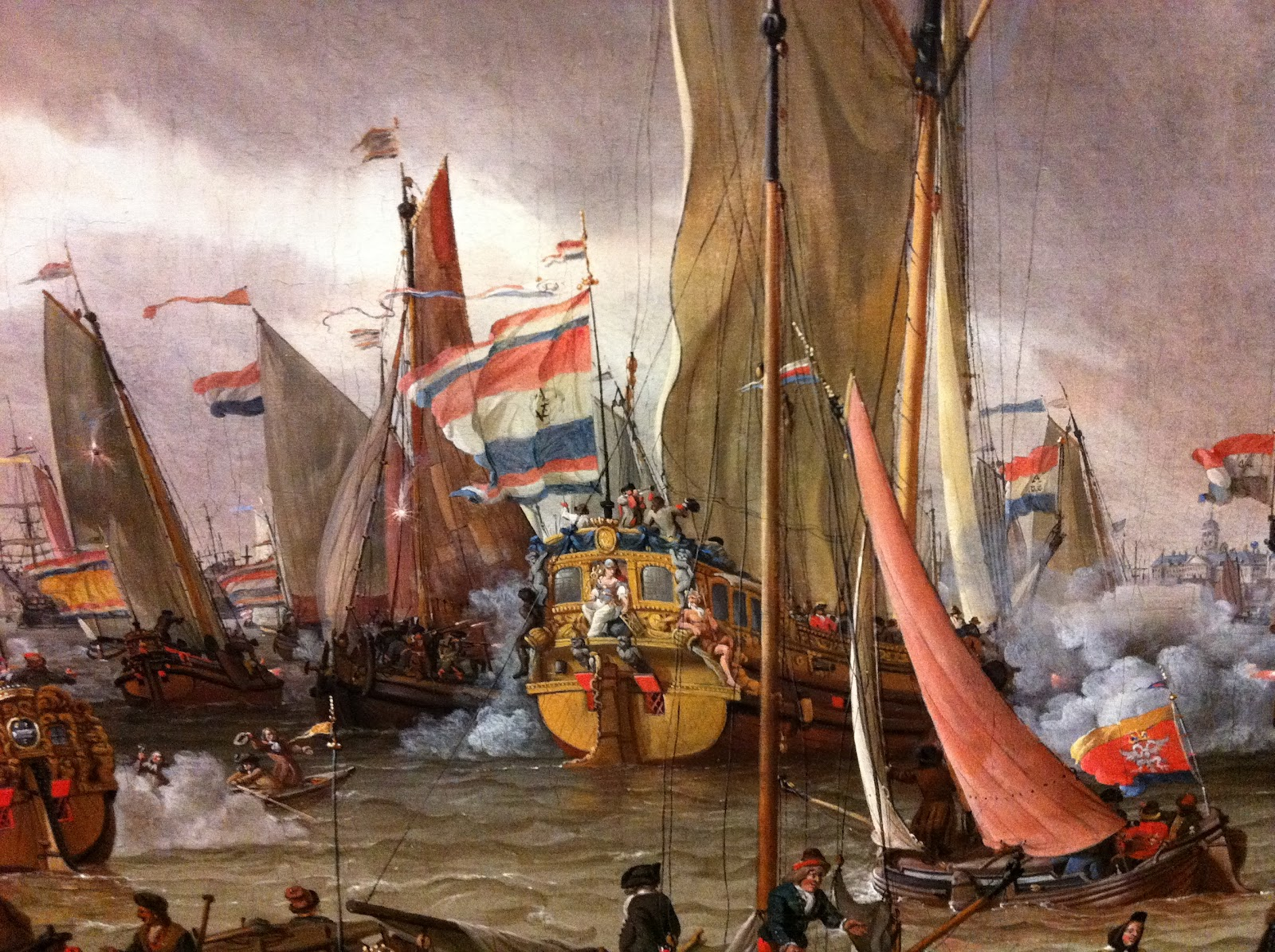
Russian flag (lower right) on the Practice battle on the river IJ in honour of Peter I, September 1697. Painting by Abraham Storck, 1700

According to Dutch newspapers, in June 1694, a 44-gun frigate bought by Russia and built in Rotterdam stood in the Amsterdam roadstead under the white-blue-red flag.

In 1696, at the mouth of the river Don, a Russian flotilla of armed rowboats blocked the supply of the Ottoman fortress of Azov. On the 1700 engraving by Adrian Shkhonebek, Taking the fortress of Azov. 1696, depicts the ships carrying rectangular panels on the flagpoles, the heraldic shading of which shows that some of the flags are blue with a straight red cross, and the rest are white with a straight red cross. A number of researchers doubt the accuracy of Shkonebek's engraving because he was not a witness to the events.

Images of various white-blue-red Russian flags are present in the three later paintings of Abraham Storck's workshop dedicated to the arrival in Amsterdam of Peter I. Peter I took part in a practice battle on the river IJ while on board the yacht of the Dutch East India Company. In the paintings of Abraham Stork depicting the show fight, this yacht sails under the white-blue-red flag with a double-headed eagle, or under a white-red-blue pennant and a white-red-blue aft flag with a double-headed eagle.

In October 1699, Peter the Great, on the back of the sheet with instructions sent to the Russian envoy Yemelyan Ukraintsev in Istanbul, drew a sketch of a three-band white-blue-red flag.

In December 1699, the Austrian ambassador Anton Paleyer gave a list of weapons and flags seen on the vessels of the Azov Flotilla in a letter. He described seeing three small flags of white-red-blue colours and two regimental colours of red and white mixed in with other colours.

In April 1700, Peter the Great ordered the Kremlin Armoury to build white-red-violet sea banners. The design and dimensions of these banners correspond to the figure and the size of the regimental banner kept among the other 352 trophy Russian banners in the burial vault of Swedish kings – the Riddarholm Church in Stockholm.

The three-band white-blue-red flag, as well as the flag with a red Jerusalem cross, were also used on warships up to 1720 as signals.

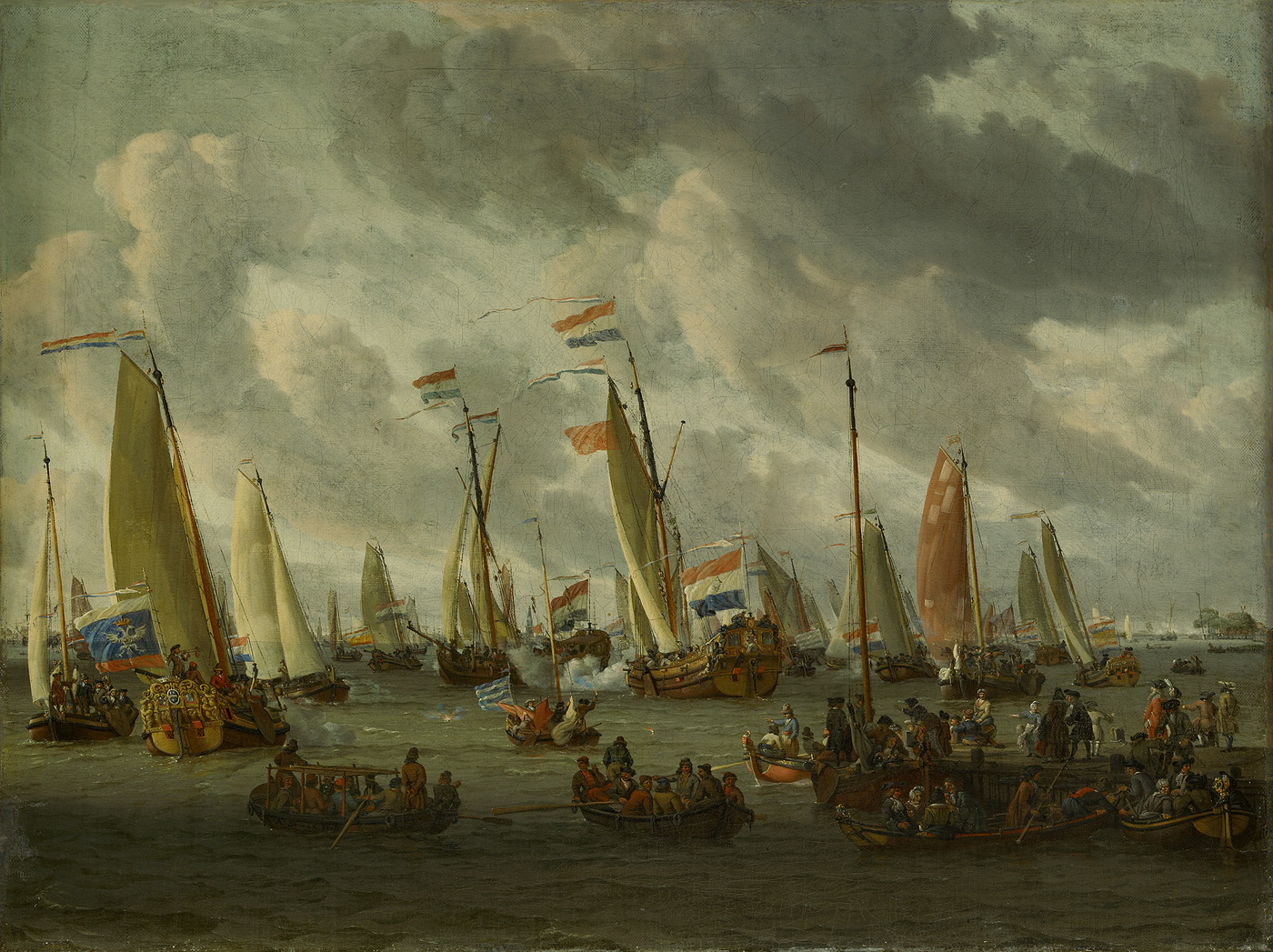
Practice battle on the river IJ in honour of Peter I, Abraham Storck, Amsterdam Museum

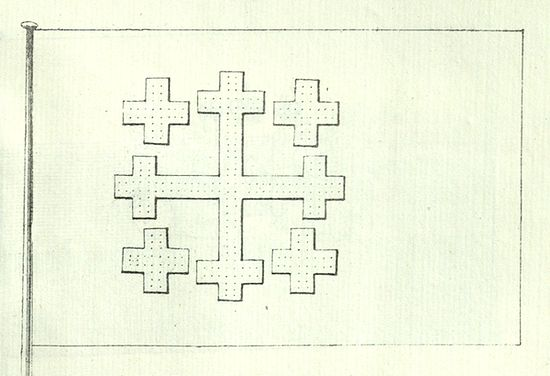
Flag with a Jerusalem Cross, 1693

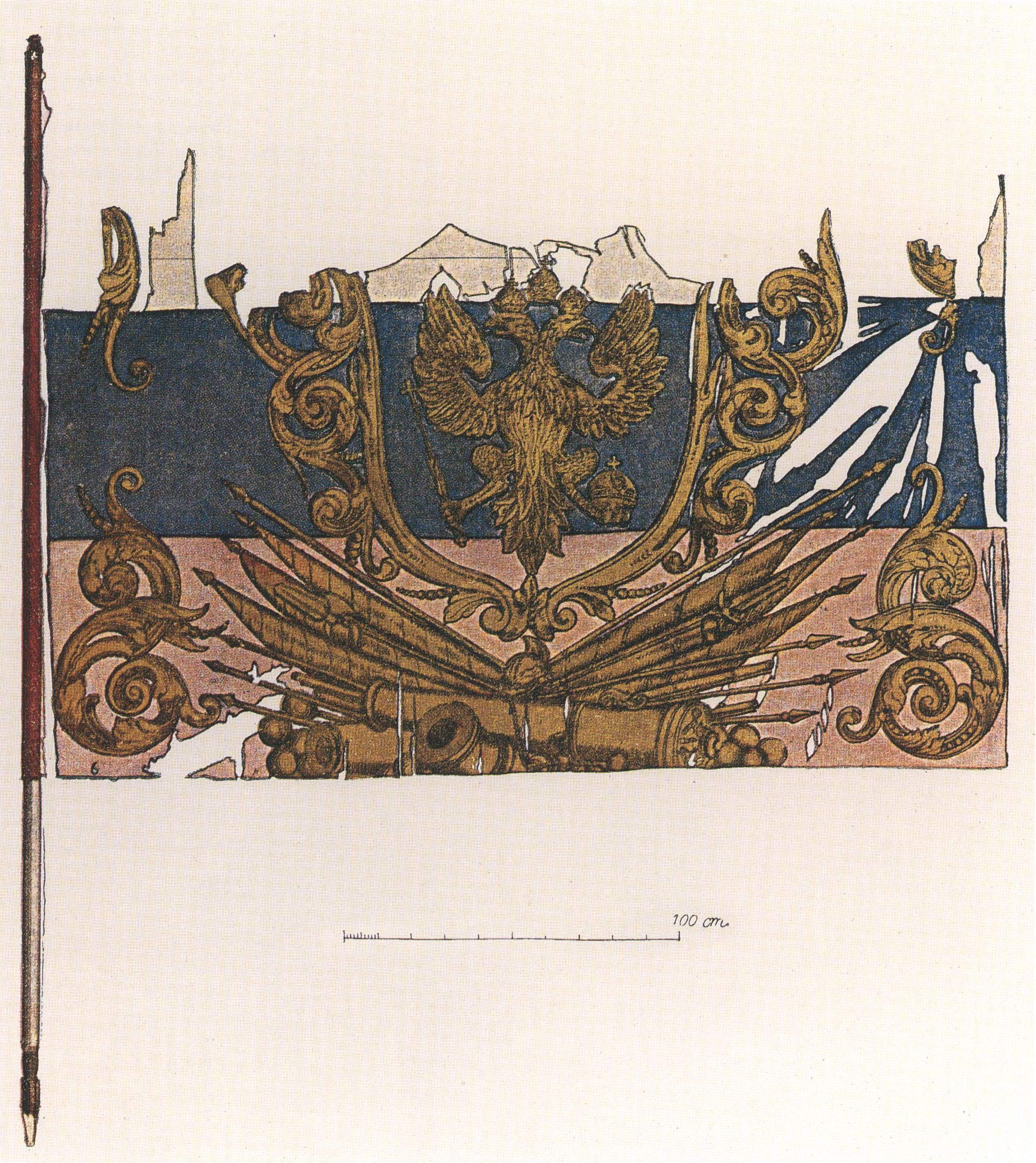
White-red-violet banners ordered by Peter I and captured by Swedes during the Battle of Narva in 1700

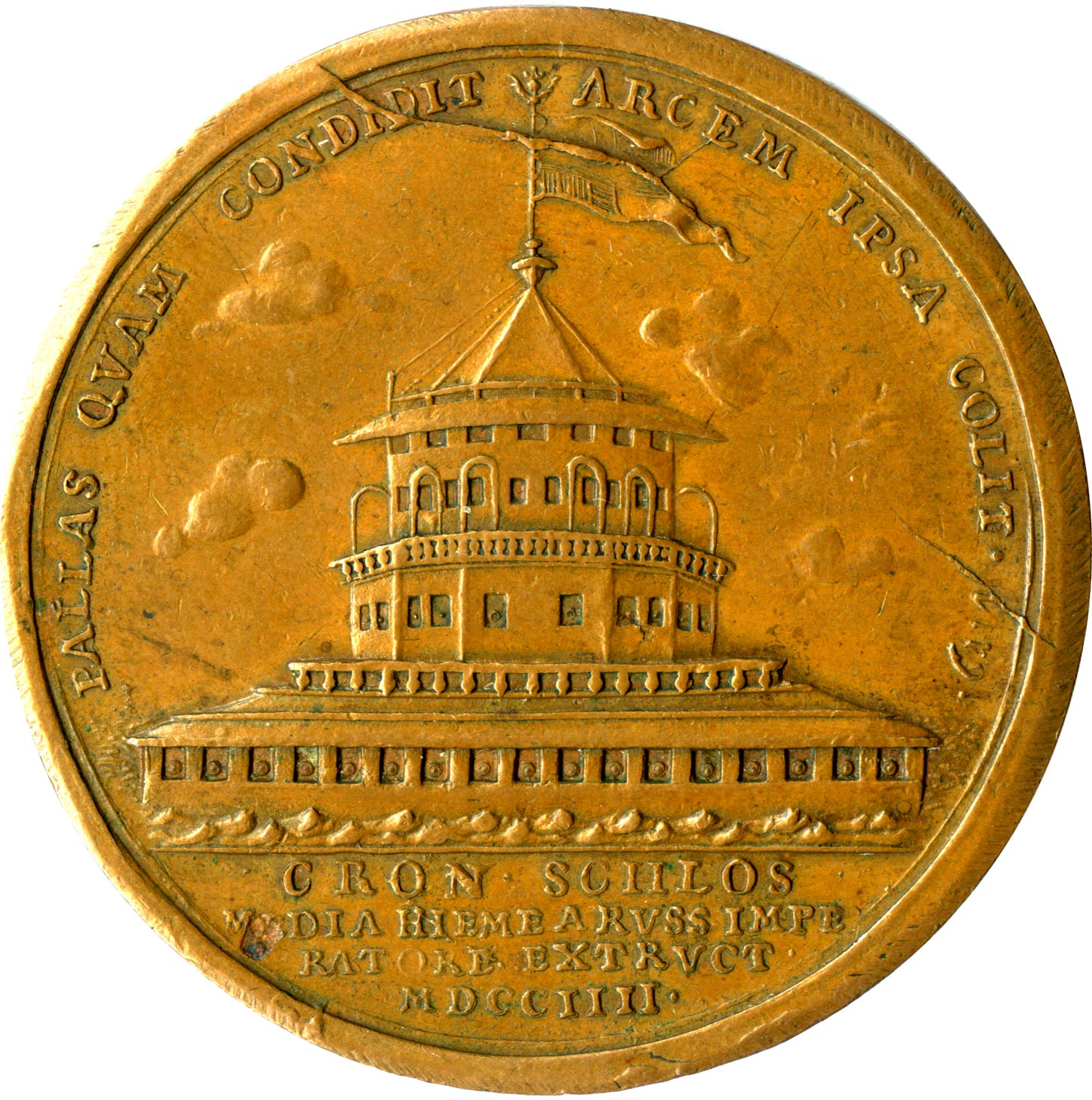
Philipp Heinrich Müller, Construction of Kronschloss Medal, 1704

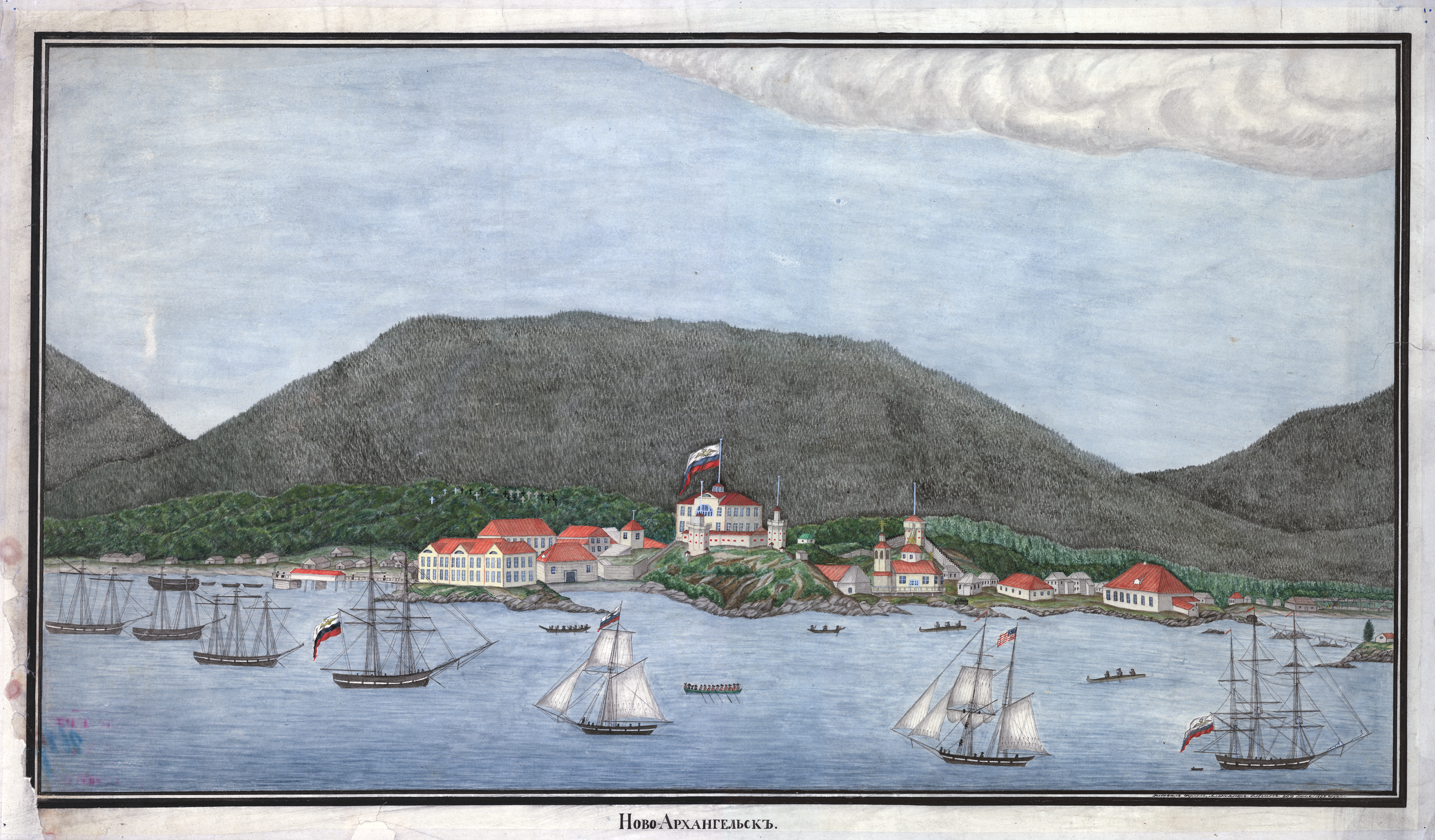
The Russian-American Company's capital at Novo Arkhangelsk (present-day Sitka, Alaska) in 1837

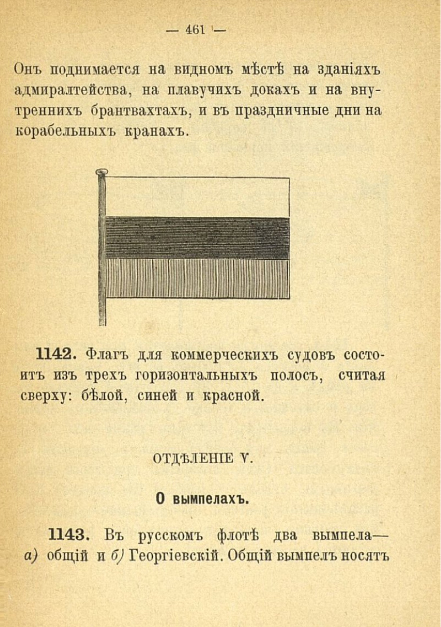
Black-and-white sketch of the flag, 1885

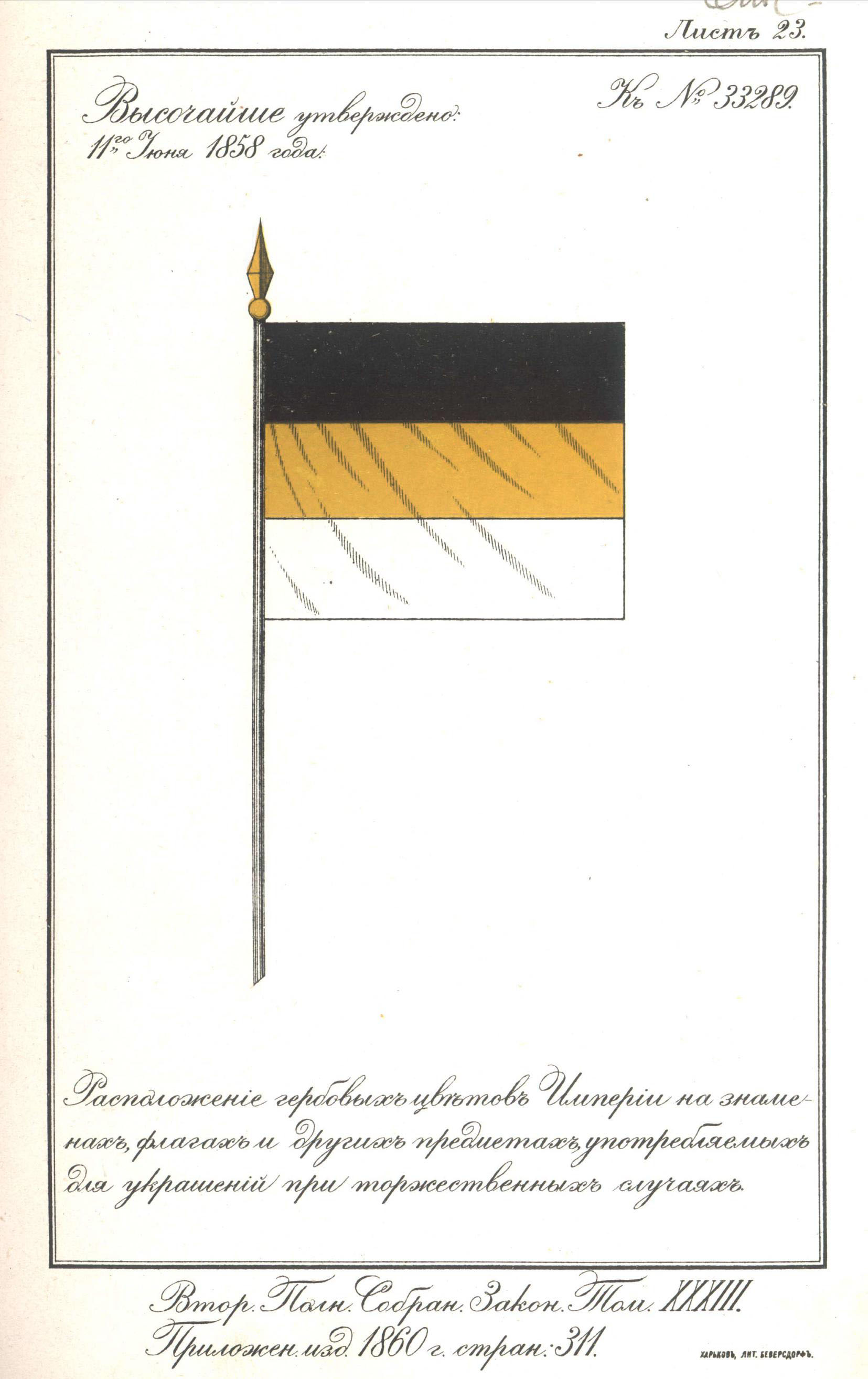
Order by Tsar Alexander II on the official flag of the Russian Empire

Tsar Alexander II's flag of the Russian Empire (1858–1896)

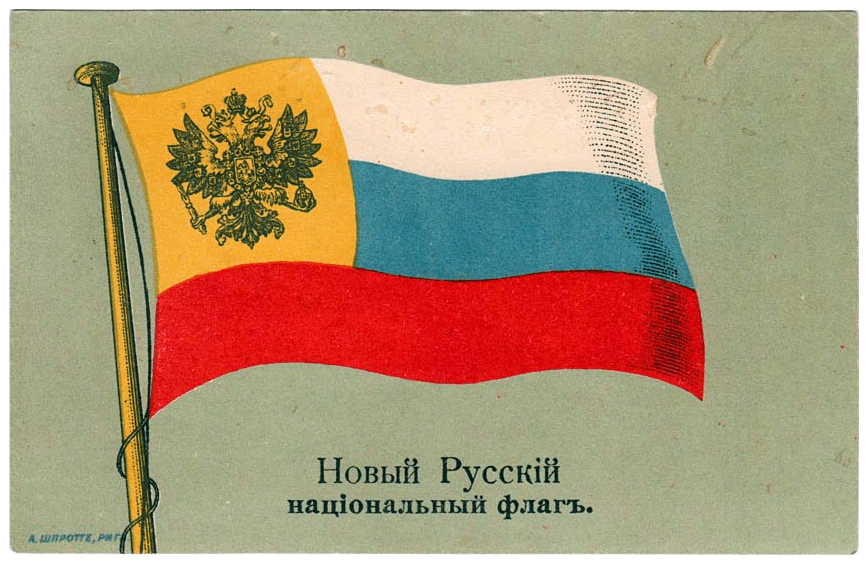
Russian flag during WWI on a postcard (1914–1917) (Note: Introduced in 1914 as a flag "for private use" to support patriotism during the war. Plans to formally adopt this design after the war were abolished after the fall of the monarchy.)

On 31 January [O.S. 20 January] 1705, Peter the Great issued an official ukaz decreeing the white-blue-red tricolour as the commercial maritime flag for all Russian merchant vessels. The colours later inspired the selection of the Pan-Slavic colors at the Prague Slavic Congress, 1848, which influenced the flags of other Slavic nations, including Slovakia, Slovenia, and Serbia.

On 23 June [O.S. 11 June] 1858, Emperor Alexander II decreed the black-yellow-white tricolour as the official heraldic state flag, based on the dynastic colours of the Romanov coat of arms. This led to a period of dual usage, with government buildings flying the black-yellow-white colours while merchant ships and private citizens continued using the white-blue-red flag. On 28 April 1883, Alexander III authorized the white-blue-red flag to be used on land for decorating buildings during public festivities.

In 1896, prior to the coronation of Nicholas II, a special imperial commission chaired by Admiral Konstantin Posyet concluded that the white-blue-red tricolour was the historical national flag of Russia; an imperial order of 29 April 1896 formally designated it as the sole national flag. In 1914, the Ministry of Internal Affairs introduced a wartime variant adding the imperial coat of arms in a yellow canton for private patriotic use. Following the February Revolution of 1917, the Russian Provisional Government retained the plain white-blue-red tricolour until the October Revolution.

=== 1918–1991: Civil War and Soviet Union (USSR) ===
Flag of the Russian SFSR (1918–1937)

Flag of the Russian SFSR (1937–1954)

Flag of the Russian SFSR (1954–1991)

On 8 April 1918, the flag of the Russian Soviet Federative Socialist Republic was discussed at a meeting of the Council of People's Commissars of the RSFSR. The Council proposed that the All-Russian Central Executive Committee create a red flag with the abbreviation for the phrase Workers of the world, unite! However, the proposal was not adopted. On 13 April 1918, the All-Russian Central Executive Committee established the RSFSR flag to be a red banner with the inscription Russian Socialist Federative Soviet Republic. The text of the decree did not contain any clarification regarding the colour, size and location of the inscription, or the width and length ratio of the cloth.

On 17 June 1918, the All-Russian Central Executive Committee approved a sample image of the flag of the RSFSR, developed on behalf of the People's Commissariat for Foreign Affairs of the Russian SFSR by the graphic artist Sergey Chekhonin. The flag was a red rectangular panel, in the upper corner of which was placed the inscription RSFSR in gold letters stylised as Slavic. This inscription was separated from the rest of the cloth on both sides by gold stripes forming a rectangle.

On 30 December 1922, the RSFSR combined with the Ukrainian SSR, Byelorussian SSR, and Transcaucasian SFSR to form the Soviet Union. The national flag of the USSR was established on 18 April 1924, described in the Constitution of the USSR as a red or scarlet rectangular cloth with a 1:2 width to length ratio, with a gold sickle and hammer in the top corner next to the flagpole and a red five-pointed star framed with a golden border. This flag was carried by all ships of the USSR and diplomatic representations of the USSR. The 1:2 red flag was used, until replaced in 1954 with the universal design of the Soviet flag with a blue stripe along the mast.

Contrary to the belief that the USSR state flag outranked the flag of the RSFSR, the actual use of the USSR flag was limited. The USSR flag in Russia flew only over two buildings, that of the Central Executive Committee of the Soviet Union and the Council of People's Commissars. That decision was adopted on 23 March 1925, also establishing that the flag of the RSFSR had to be raised constantly not only on the buildings of the Central Executive Committee and the Council of People's Commissars but also on the buildings of all local soviets, including village soviets and district soviets in cities. On holidays, the RSFSR flag had to be raised on many public buildings (such as schools, hospitals, and government offices).

Patch of the First Russian National Army, one of the German-collaborationist militias which fought the Red Army during World War II

During the Second World War, the white-blue-red tricolour was used by German collaborators, most of whom were from groups targeted by the repressions of the Stalin era, including anti-communist Christians and the remnants of the Kulaks, who generally regarded the German invasion as a liberation of Russia from communism. The Russian Liberation Army under the leadership of Andrey Vlasov used the tricolour during a military flag.

On 20 January 1947, the Presidium of the Supreme Soviet of the USSR found it necessary to amend the national flags of the allied republics so that the flags reflected the idea of a Soviet Union state as well as the unique national identities of the republics. On each of the flags was placed the emblem of the USSR, a sickle and a hammer with a red five-pointed star, with the inclusion of national ornaments and new colours. The new RSFSR flag was established in January 1954: a red rectangular panel with a light blue strip near the pole running the full width of the flag. In the upper left corner of the red canvas were depicted a golden sickle and a hammer and above them a red five-pointed star framed with a golden border. By the Law of the RSFSR of 2 June 1954, this flag was approved and the description of the flag was included in Article 149 of the Constitution of the RSFSR.

=== 1991–present: Russian Federation ===
Post-Soviet Russian flag, 1:2 with different colour shades (1991–1993)

The exact same flag, but with the usual colours

During the dissolution of the Soviet Union, after the 1991 August Coup, the Russian SFSR adopted a new flag design similar to the pre-revolutionary tricolour that had been abolished in 1917. The ratio of the new flag was 1:2, and the flag colours consisted of white on the top, blue in the middle, and red on the bottom, with light saturation of colours. The flag design remained the same until 1993, when the original Russian tricolour was fully restored as the current flag after the 1993 Russian constitutional crisis. Following the events of the attempted coup in Moscow, the supreme soviet of the Russian SFSR declared, by resolution dated 22 August 1991, that the old imperial tricolour flag serve as the national flag of the state. The constitution was subsequently amended by Law No. 1827-1 1 November 1991. At the disintegration of the USSR on 25 December 1991, the Soviet flag was lowered from Kremlin and then replaced by the tricolour flag.

The modern era flag underwent a proportion change from 1:2 to 2:3 and darker saturation of colours in 1993 and has been most recently provided for by a 2000 law. On 11 December 1993, President of the Russian Federation Boris Yeltsin signed Decree No. 2126 "On the State Flag of the Russian Federation". In Article 1 of the decree, the flag was described as a "rectangular panel of three equal horizontal stripes: the top – white, middle – blue, and bottom – red, with a width to length ratio of 2:3." The pre-1993 flag is still depicted on Russian licence plates, as the design specifications were finalised and published 6 months prior to Yeltsin's decree.

The National Flag Day is an official holiday in Russia, established in 1994. It is celebrated on 22 August, the day of the victory over putschists in 1991, but employees remain at work.

== Symbolism ==
At the times of Alexander III of Russia the official interpretation was as follows: the white colour symbolises nobility and frankness; the blue for faithfulness, honesty, impeccability, and chastity; and the red for courage, generosity, and love. A common unofficial interpretation was: Red: Great Russia, White: White Russia, Blue: Little Russia.

== Regulations ==
When the Russian flag and the flags of the Russian federal subjects are flown at the same time, the national flag should be:

- on the left if two flags are raised
- in the middle if the number of flags is odd
- and to the left of the centre if the number is even

The flag cannot be smaller, or lower than a regional flag.

== Colour specifications ==
Specifications for the flag of Russia

Federal constitutional law says that the colours of the flag are "white", "blue" (синий, or dark blue, as Russian has two colours that are called "blue" in English), and "red", but does not actually specify which shades the colours should be. Russian government agencies, when ordering the manufacture of cloth for the flag, indicate the following Pantone colours: white, blue (Pantone 286C), and red (Pantone 485C).

| Scheme | White | Blue | Red |
|---|---|---|---|
| RAL | 9016 Traffic white | 5005 Signal blue | 3028 Pure red |
| Pantone | White | 286 C | 485 C |
| RGB | 255–255–255 | 0–50–160 | 218–41–28 |
| CMYK | 0–0–0–0 | 100–80–0–12 | 0–95–100–0 |
| HTML | #FFFFFF | #0032A0 | #DA291C |

The album of national flags, published by the Hydrographic and Oceanographic Service of the Navy (France), gives the following shades of colours of the flag of Russia in Pantone:

| Scheme | White | Blue | Red |
|---|---|---|---|
| Pantone | White | 293C | 485C |

== Variant versions ==
Flag of the Tsar, c. 17th century

Presidential standard

A variant of the flag was authorised for private use by Tsar Nicholas II before World War I, adding the large state eagle on a yellow field (imperial standard) in the canton. It has never been used as the official state flag. Likewise, today some Russian people may use another variant of the flag defaced with the coat of arms (in this case the double-headed eagle is depicted without the shield) in the middle and the golden word 'РОССИЯ' at the bottom.

After the October Revolution of 1917, the tricolour design was banned, and a definitive new flag of the Russian SFSR was introduced in 1954 (see flag of the Russian SFSR), and this remained the republic's flag until the collapse of the Soviet Union in 1991. All of the Soviet republics' flags were created by introducing a small but noticeable change to the flag of the Soviet Union. For Russia, the change was an introduction of the left-hand blue band. The previous Soviet design was different, a plain red flag with different variants of the "RSFSR" abbreviation in the canton. Today, the Soviet flag is used by the supporters and members of the Communist Party of the Russian Federation.

The tricolour was used by the anti-communist forces during the Civil War called the White movement. It was continued to be used by White émigrés in various countries as the Russian flag. The tricolour was associated both in Soviet Russia as well as the Russian White emigre communities as symbolising a traditional tsarist Orthodox Russia. This flag can be seen inside a few Orthodox churches in the West established by the Russian communities. In the Soviet Union, the tricolour was used in films set in the pre-revolutionary period and was seen as a historical flag, especially after the 1940s.

It, rather than the black-yellow-white colour combination, was readopted by Russia on 22 August 1991. That date is celebrated yearly as National Flag Day per Presidential Decree No. 1714 of 20 August 1994. The Russian president uses a standard which was introduced via Presidential Decree No.319 on 15 February 1994. It is officially defined as the square tricolour with the coat of arms (in this case the double-headed eagle is depicted without the shield) in the middle.

== Unicode ==
The flag of Russia is represented as the Unicode emoji sequence U+1F1F7 🇷 REGIONAL INDICATOR SYMBOL LETTER R and U+1F1FA 🇺 REGIONAL INDICATOR SYMBOL LETTER U, making "🇷🇺".

== See also ==
- Coat of arms of Moscow
- Coat of arms of Russia
- Flags of the federal subjects of Russia
- List of Russian flags
- Flag of the Russian-American Company
- Flag of Bulgaria (developed from the Russian flag since 1877, but the blue stripe is replaced by light green one)
- Flag of Dagestan (nearly identical design, green stripe instead of white)
- Flag of the Donetsk People's Republic (nearly identical design, black stripe instead of white)
- Flag of the Luhansk People's Republic (nearly identical design, turquoise stripe instead of white)
- Flag of Serbia (developed from the Russian flag since 1835, but the white and red colours are inverted upside down)
- Flag of Slovakia (nearly identical design, defaced with the coat of arms at the hoist side)
- Flag of Slovenia (nearly identical design, defaced with the coat of arms at the hoist side)
- Flag of Transnistria
- White-blue-white flag (variant used by anti-war protesters against the invasion of Ukraine)
