= Flag of Dagestan =

Dagestan
- Use: Civil and state flag
- Proportion: 2:3
- Adopted: 26 February 1994 (original), 19 November 2003 (modified)
- Design: A horizontal tricolor of green, blue, and red.
- Designed by: Abdulvagab C. Muratchayev (ГӀабдулвагьаб Муратчаев)

The flag of Dagestan (Note: Russian: Флаг Дагестана; Avar: Дагъистаналъул байрахъ; Azerbaijani: Дағыстан бајрағы, romanized: Dağıstan bayrağı; Lezgian: Дагъустандин тӀаратӀ; Kumyk: Дагъыстаны байракъ, romanized: Dağıstanı bayraq; Muslim Tat: ГӀэлэм э Догъисту, romanized: Ⱨələm ə Doƣistu; Tabassaran: Дагъустандин пайдагъ; Rutul: Дагъыстандид пайдах; Lak: Дагъусттаннал ттугъ) was adopted after the transformation of the Dagestan ASSR into the Republic of Dagestan within the Russian Federation. The flag was formally adopted on 26 February 1994. It features a horizontal tricolor of green (for Islam), blue (for the Caspian Sea), and red (for courage and fidelity). On 19 November 2003 the proportion of the flag was changed from the original 1:2 to 2:3, and the middle stripe from light blue to blue.

== Colours scheme ==
The official colours scheme was declared on 19 November 2003.

Colors scheme	Green	Blue	Red
CMYK	100-0-50-42	100-66-0-35	0-80-86-16
HEX	#009349	#0039A6	#D52B1E
RGB	0-147-73	0-57-166	213-43-30

== Symbolism ==
Green represents life and the abundance of the land of Dagestan, and is also the traditional color of Islam (Dagestani people are predominantly Sunni Muslims). Dark (formerly light) blue, the color of the sea (the eastern part of the republic is washed by the Caspian Sea), symbolizes the beauty and grandeur of the Dagestani people. Red signifies democracy, the enlightening power of the human mind in the process of creating life, and the courage and bravery of the people of the Land of Mountains (Dagestan). Unofficial interpretations describe the green color as the representative of Northeast Caucasian (Avars, Aghuls, Dargins, Rutulians, Tsakhurs, Tabasarans, Lezgins, Laks, Chechens, Tsez etc.) people, the blue color as the representative of the Turkic peoples (Kumyks, Nogais, Azerbaijanis) and red color as the representative of Slavic (Russian) people and Iranian people (Tats).

== Historical flags ==
Following its formation from parts of the Mountainous Republic of the Northern Caucasus in 1921, the Dagestan Autonomous Soviet Socialist Republic had several flags of the standard ASSR, first red flags defaced with the initials of the ASSR name (i.e. ДАССР) and then a RSFSR flag defaced with the same. With the fall of the Soviet Union, Dagestan dropped the А (for Автономная 'autonomous') from its flag and the inscription read simply ДССР. A flag with horizontal blue and yellow stripes may have been used briefly in 1993 and 1994 until a variation of the current horizontal tricolor was adopted in 1994.

Flag	Date	Use	Description
	19th-century	Flag of the 19th-century Caucasian Imamate (Imamate of Dagestan)	
	1878–1921	Dagestan Oblast had no flag	
	1925–1927	Flag of the Dagestan ASSR	
	1917–1920	Flag of the Mountainous Republic of the Northern Caucasus	
	1927–1954	Flag of the Dagestan ASSR	
	1954–1991	Flag of the Dagestan ASSR	
	1991–1994	Flag of the Dagestan SSR (1991–1992)	
	1991–1994	Flag of the Republic of Dagestan (1992–1994)	
	1994–2003	Flag of the Republic of Dagestan	A horizonatal tricolor of green, blue and red.

== Other flags ==
Several peoples in Dagestan have devised their own ethnic flags:

Flag	Date	Use	Description
	?–Present	Flag of the Avar people of Dagestan	
	2012–Present	Flag of the Aghul people of Dagestan	
	2014–Present	Flag of the Kumyk people of Dagestan	
	?–Present	Flag of the Lak people of Dagestan	
	?–Present	Flag of the Nogai people of Dagestan	
	?–Present	Flag of the Lezgin people of Dagestan	
	2011–Present	Flag of the Rutulians of Dagestan	A horizontal tricolor of green-white-green, with a green crescent and star on the middle.
	2020–Present	Flag of the Tabasaran people of Dagestan	
	?–Present	Flag of the Tabasaran people of Dagestan	
	2012–Present	Flag of the Tsakhur people of Dagestan	

== Gallery ==
Flag	Date	Use	Description
	2004–Present	Standard of the head of Dagestan	A horizonatal tricolor of green, blue and red, with the coat of arms of Dagestan on the middle.
	2022	Flag of the independent Dagestan	A horizontal tricolor of green-white-green, with a green crescent and star slightly on the left.
	2022	Flag used by anti-mobilization protesters in Dagestan	A horizontal tricolor of white-green-white.

== See also ==
- Flag of Russia
- Flag of the Republic of Karelia
- Coat of arms of Dagestan
