= Coat of arms of Kabardino-Balkaria =

Emblem of the Kabardino-Balkarian Autonomous Soviet Socialist Republic
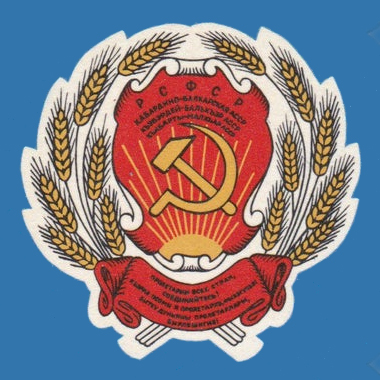
- Armiger: Kabardino-Balkarian Autonomous Soviet Socialist Republic
- Adopted: 23 June 1937
- Crest: Red star
- Supporters: Wheat and Cotton
- Motto: Russian: Пролетарии всех стран, соединяйтесь! Kabardian: Къэрал псоми я пролетархэ, фызэгухъэ! Karachay-Balkar: Битеу къыралланы пролетарлары, бирлешигиз! English: Workers of the world, unite!

The national emblem of the Kabardino-Balkarian Autonomous Soviet Socialist Republic was adopted in 1937 by the government of the Kabardino-Balkarian Autonomous Soviet Socialist Republic. The emblem is identical to the emblem of the Russian Soviet Federative Socialist Republic.

== History ==
=== First revision ===
On June 24, 1937, the Extraordinary 10th Congress of Soviets of the Kabardino-Balkarian ASSR adopted the Constitution of the Kabardino-Balkarian ASSR. The Article 10 of the constitution described the emblem of the Kabardino-Balkarian ASSR:

The state emblem of the Kabardino-Balkarian Autonomous Soviet Socialist Republic is the national emblem of the Russian SFSR, which consists of an image of a gold sickle and a hammer, placed a cross on a cross, with handles down, on a red background in the rays of the sun and framed with ears with the inscription "Р.С.Ф.С.Р." and "Proletarians of all countries, unite!" in Russian, Kabardian and Balkar languages, with the addition under the inscription "RSFSR"letters of a smaller size of the inscription "Kabardino-Balkarian ASSR" in Russian, Kabardian and Balkarian m languages ".

— Constitution of the Kabardino-Balkarian ASSR (1937), Article 111

=== Second revision ===
On 1937, the Kabardian language changed its method of writing to Cyrilic letters. The Ltin script was still used for the Balkarian language. In accordance with the amendments of the Constitution of the Kabardino-Balkarian ASSR on 1937, the inscriptions on the arms and flag were:
РСФСР - РСФСР - RSFSR
Кабардино-Балкарская АССР (in Russian)
Къабардей-Балэкъар АССР (in Kabardian)
Qabartь - Balqar ASSR (in Balkar)

=== Third revision ===
On July 26, 1938, the Supreme Council of the Kabardino-Balkarain ASSR adopted the Law of the Kabardino-Balkarian ASSR "On Amending Articles 44, 63, 111 and 112 of the Constitution of the Kabardino-Balkarian ASSR". The Article 3 of the law read:

In connection with the translation of the Balkarian script into the Cyrilic letter, the inscriptions in the State Emblem of the Kabardino-Balkarian ASSR and the State Flag, established by Articles 111 and 112 of the Constitution of the Kabardino-Balkarian ASSR was to exclude the repetition of the expression "RSFSR" in Balkar in the Latin script, leaving this expression in a single, common for Russian, Kabardian and Balkarian languages of the inscription "РСФСР". The words in the Balkar language "Kabardino-Balkarian ASSR" are changed to Cyrilic letters.

— On Amending Articles 44, 63, 111 and 112 of the Constitution of the Kabardino-Balkarian ASSR (1938), Article 3

=== Fourth revision ===
Since 1939 the name in the Kabardian language has been changed, from "Къабардей-Балэкъар АССР" to "Къэбэрдей-Балъкъэр А.С.С.Р".

=== Fifth revision (as the Kabardin ASSR) ===
From October 1942 to January 1943 the territory of the Kabardino-Balkarian ASSR was occupied by German troops. After the Soviet Army liberated the territory of the Kabardino-Balkar, the OGPU and the NKVD accused the entire Balkar people cooperating with the Nazis and, on the decision of the State Defense Committee of the USSR, on February 23, 1944, all the Balkar population was deported to Central Asia.

On July 10, 1945, the law of the Kabardino-Balkarian ASSR "On Amending the Constitution of the Kabardino-Balkarian ASSR" changed the name of the republic to the Kabardin ASSR, which was reflected in the descriptions of the arms and flag in articles 111 and 112 of the Constitution of the KASSR, of which references to Balkaria and Balkar language were removed. The inscription on the coat of arms and the flag during this period looked like this:
Р.С.Ф.С.Р
Кабардинская А.С.С.Р.
Къэбэрдей А.С.С.Р.

After the 20th Congress of the CPSU, on November 24, 1956, the CPSU Central Committee adopted a resolution "On Restoring the National Autonomy of the Kalmyk, Karachai, Balkar, Chechen and Ingush Peoples", a sweeping accusation of betrayal from the Balkarian people was lifted and the Balkars were allowed to return to their former place of residence.

=== Sixth revision (as the Kabardino-Balkarian ASSR) ===
On January 9, 1957, the Presidium of the Supreme Soviet of the USSR issued a decree "On the transformation of the Kabardin ASSR into the Kabardino-Balkarian ASSR", approved on February 11, 1957, by the Law of the USSR. The law of the KABSSR of 29 March 1957 on the State Emblem of the KABSSR contained inscriptions: "Кабардино-Балкарская АССР/ Къэбэрдей-Балъкъэр АССР/ Къабарты-Малкъар АССР". The new name "Kabardin-Malkar ASSR" reflects the new name of the Balkarian people in the Balkar language - "Malkar", which comes from the ethnonym Balkarian population of the Chereksky Gorge - "Malkar".

=== Seventh revision ===
On May 26, 1978, the extraordinary 8th session of the Supreme Council of the Kabardino-Balkarian ASSR adopted the new Constitution of the Kabardino-Balkarian ASSR. The article 157 of the constitution added a red five-pointed star to the emblem.

== Gallery ==
Emblem of the Kabardin ASSR (1945–1957)

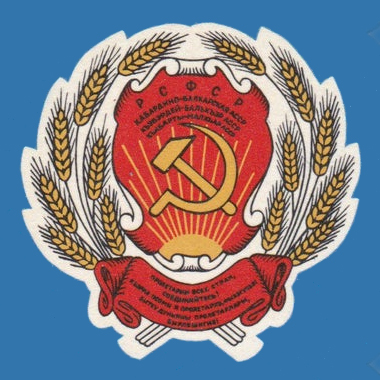
Emblem of the Kabardino-Balkarian ASSR (1957–1978)

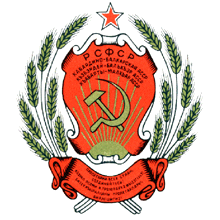
Emblem of the Kabardino-Balkarian ASSR (1978–1991), the Kabardino-Balkarian SSR (1991–1992) and the Kabardino-Balkarian Republic (1992–1994)

== See also ==
- Flag of Kabardino-Balkaria
