= Flag of Kabardino-Balkaria =

Flag of the Russian republic of Kabardino-Balkaria

Kabardino-Balkaria
- Proportion: 2:3
- Adopted: 21 July 1994
- Design: A tricolor of light blue, white, and green with a Mount Elbrus charge in the center.
- Flag of the Kabardino-Balkarian SSR, then Kabardino-Balkaria (1991–1994)
- Proportion: 1:2
- Adopted: 31 January 1991
- Design: Variant of the flag of the Russian SFSR with "Kabardino-Balkarian SSR" written in the Russian, Kabardian, and Balkar languages below the hammer and sickle.

The flag of Kabardino-Balkaria in the Russian Federation (Note: Russian: Государственный Флаг Кабардино-Балкарской Республики; Karachay-Balkar: Къабарты-Малкъар Республиканы Къырал Байрагъы; Kabardian: Къэбэрдей-Балъкъэр Рэспубликэм и Къэрал Нып) is a horizontal tricolour, charged with a white silhouette of Mount Elbrus, the highest mountain in Europe, in the center. The colors are arranged in the order of light blue, white, and green, with the charge of Mount Elbrus following the same order.

The flag was adopted on July 21, 1994; its proportions are 2:3.

== Description ==
The flag of Kabardino-Balkaria within Russia is a panel of three equal horizontal stripes. The top stripe is light blue, the middle stripe is white, and the bottom stripe is green. In the center of the white stripe is a circle crossed by a light-blue and green field. On a light-blue field is a stylized image of Mount Elbrus in white. The ratio of the flag's width to its length is 2:3.

The light-blue color on the flag symbolizes the boundless and clear sky of the Kabardino-Balkarian land, as well as its rivers and waters. Also, the blue color is also revered among the Turkic peoples, and the Balkars, considered one of the two titular peoples of the Kabardino-Balkarian Republic, are an Alanian and Turkic-speaking people. White is a symbol of peace and purity, as well as Islam, which is the traditional religion in the republic. The green color is also revered in Islam, being also the personification of fertility and beauty, the beautiful nature of Kabardino-Balkaria, and also revered by the Kabardians (Adyghe people) – one of the two titular peoples of this republic.

== Color scheme ==
Colors scheme	Blue	White	Green
CMYK	82-40-0-0	0-0-0-0	100-0-59-42
HEX	#2F9AFF	#FFFFFF	#00933D
RGB	46-153-255	255-255-255	0-147-61

== Historical flags ==
Flag	Years of use	Ratio	Government	Notes
	1922–1937	1:2	Kabardino-Balkarian Autonomous Oblast (1922–1936)	
	1922–1937	1:2	Kabardino-Balkarian ASSR (1936–1937)	
	1937–1938	1:2	Kabardino-Balkarian ASSR	
	1938–1945	1:2	Kabardino-Balkarian ASSR	
	1945–1954	1:2	Kabardin ASSR	
	1954–1957	1:2	Kabardin ASSR	
	1957–1978	1:2	Kabardino-Balkarian ASSR	
	1978–1991	1:2	Kabardino-Balkarian ASSR	
	1991–1994	1:2	Kabardino-Balkarian SSR (1991–1992)	
	1991–1994	1:2	Kabardino-Balkaria (1992–1994)	
	1994–Present	2:3	Kabardino-Balkaria	

== Other ==
Flag	Years of use	Description	Notes
	1993–Present	Ethnic flag of the Balkar people	

== See also ==
- Flag of the Kabardino-Balkarian Autonomous Soviet Socialist Republic
- Mount Elbrus
- Flag of Karachay-Cherkessia
