= Flag of the Chuvash Autonomous Soviet Socialist Republic =

Chuvash Autonomous Soviet Socialist Republic
- Flag of the Chuvash ASSR (1978–1990)
- Use: Civil and state flag
- Proportion: 1:2
- Adopted: 6 May 1954; 26 October 1978 (minor changes)
- Design: A red flag with a light-blue stripe at the pole, with golden red star and hammer and sickle.
- Designed by: Valentin Petrovich Viktorov

The flag of the Chuvash Autonomous Soviet Socialist Republic was adopted in 1954 by the government of the Chuvash Autonomous Soviet Socialist Republic. The flag is identical to the flag of the Russian Soviet Federative Socialist Republic.

== History ==
On 25 February 1926, the Presidium of the CEC of the Chuvash ASSR established a commission to develop the coat of arms and flag of the republic, announcing a contest for the best flag design.

=== First version ===
On 10 December 1926, the commission decided to adopt the flag of Chuvash ASSR with the following description:

The state flag of the Chuvash Autonomous Socialist Soviet Republic consists of a red or scarlet cloth, which in the upper left corner has an inset of white canvas with golden letters: "Ч.А.С.С.Р.", framed by the Chuvash ornament. The ratio of the width of the flag to length 1: 2. The ratio of the white to the red panel is 1:9.

The flag drawing according to the approved description was made by the artist P. E. Martens. The flag was adopted officially by the resolution of the Presidium of the CEC of the Chuvash ASSR of January 3, 1927.

=== Second version ===
On 31 March 1927, the 2nd All-Chuvash Congress of Soviets approved the new state flag of the Republic, by the Resolutions of the 2nd (7th) All-Chuvash Congress of Soviets:

The flag consists of a red or scarlet cloth, on the upper left corner of which is a white canvas with ChuSSR framed in Chuvash ornament with red letters "ЧАССР", in front of which are a sickle and hammer in the upper corner, Crossed crosswise with arms downwards. The ratio of the width of the flag to the length is 1:2, and the white insert to the red panel - 1:9

=== Third version ===
On 12 February 1931, by the Resolution of the All-Chuvash Congress of Soviets, the "On the State Emblem and Flag of the Chuvash ASSR" clarified the Chuvash language inscription of the motto "Proletarians, unite all countries!". The motto was placed on the flag along with the sickle and hammer and the abbreviation of the name of the republic (ЧАССР). The traditional ornament was also removed. The description of the new flag was contained in the decree:

The flag consists of a red or scarlet cloth. In the upper left-hand corner there is a golden sickle and hammer placed crosswise with the arms downwards. Under the sickle and hammer there is an inscription in gold letters "ЧАССР" and on the top right-hand corner of the flag there is an inscription: «Пӗтӗм тӗнђӗри пролеттарисем, пӗрлешӗр!». The ratio of flag width to length is 1:2

==== Minor revision ====
The flag underwent minor changes, which was confirmed on 19 May 1933. The motto changed from «Пӗтӗм тӗнђӗри пролеттарисем, пӗрлешӗр!» to «Пӗтӗм тӗнчӗри пролетарисем, пӗрлешӗр!»

In 1936, the flag was simplified, only the hammer and sickle, the name of the republic and the motto "Workers of all countries, unite".

=== Fourth version ===
According to the Constitution of the Chuvash ASSR, which was adopted on 18 July 1937, the flag of the Chuvash ASSR became similar to the symbols of the RSFSR, but with the addition of the name of the Chuvash ASSR in Russian and Chuvash. The inscription on the flag was arranged with the abbreviation "АССР" was shared for both the Russian and Chuvash inscription.

The description of the flag was contained in the Article 112 of Chapter X of the Constitution of the Chuvash ASSR.

The national flag of the Chuvash Autonomous Soviet Socialist Republic is the national flag of the RSFSR, consisting of a red cloth, in the left corner of which, at the top of the flag, are placed the golden letters "RSFSR" in Russian and Chuvash languages, with letters "Chuvash ASSR" in Russian and Chuvash languages, under the inscription "RSFSR".

— Constitution of the Chuvash Autonomous Soviet Socialist Republic (1937), Article 112

Note that in this version, the inscription «РСФСР» was written twice.

=== Revision ===
The flag was revised on 11 June 1940, with the removal of the same inscription «РСФСР». The «РСФСР» was now written only once.

=== Fifth version ===
On 6 May 1954, the Decree of the Presidium of the Supreme Soviet of the RSFSR "On the State Flag of the Chuvash ASSR" was issued, and on 16 June 1954, the Supreme Council passed the Law of the Chuvash ASSR on the State Flag of the Chuvash ASSR. The law made an amendment to the article of the Constitution concerning the description of the flag. The flag of the Chuvash ASSR is identical to the flag of the Russian SFSR, but was supplemented with the inscription "Chuvash ASSR" in the Chuvash language.

On 10 February 1956, a new Regulation on the State Flag of the Chuvash ASSR was approved. The description of the flag in the text of the Regulations looked like this:

The state flag of the Chuvash Autonomous Soviet Socialist Republic is the National Flag of the RSFSR, consisting of a red cloth with a light blue stripe at the flagpole, the full width of the flag.
The light blue stripe is 1/8 of the flag's length.
In the left upper corner of the red cloth there are golden sickles and a hammer and a red five-pointed star above them, framed by a gold border.
Under the image of a sickle and hammer there is an inscription in gold and letters "Chuvash ASSR" in Russian and Chuvash languages.
The ratio of the width of the flag to the length is 1:2.

The hammer and sickle fit into a square whose side is 1/4 the width of the flag.
The sharp end of the sickle falls in the middle of the upper side of the square, the handles of the sickle and hammer abut the lower corners of the square.
The length of the hammer with a handle is 3/4 diagonal square.
The five-pointed star fits into a circle with a diameter of 1/8 of the flag's width, touching the upper side of the square.

The distance of the vertical axis of the star, sickle and hammer from the shaft is 2/5 of the width of the flag.
The distance from the top edge of the flag to the center of the star is 1/8 the width of the flag.

— Regulation on the State Flag of the Chuvash ASSR (1956)

By the regulations, the flag itself was approved by the Resolution of the Council of Ministers of the Chuvash ASSR on 17 February 1956.

On 5 January 1967, the Decree of the PVS of the Chuvash ASSR "On Amendments to the Regulations on the National Flag of the Chuvash ASSR” was adopted. The appearance of the flag was not changed by the decree.

The extraordinary 8th session of the Supreme Council of the Chuvash ASSR of the 9th convocation on 31 May 1978, approved a new Constitution of the Chuvash ASSR. The flag of the Chuvash ASSR was reapproved through this constitution.

The national flag of the Chuvash Autonomous Soviet Socialist Republic is the RSFSR State Flag, which is a red rectangular panel with a light blue stripe at the flagpole, which is one eighth of the flag’s length. the hammer and a red five-pointed star above them, framed by a gold border, and under them in gold letters is placed the inscription "Chuvash ASSR" in the Russian and Chuvash languages. The ratio of the width of the flag to a length of 1:2.

— Constitution of the Chuvash Autonomous Soviet Socialist Republic (1978), Article 158

=== Sixth version ===
On 26 October 1978, the new decree of the PVA of the Chuvash ASSR "On the State Flag of the Chuvash ASSR" approved the image of the flag. The inscription on the flag began to be separated in Russian and in Chuvash.

The decree of the PVA of the Chuvash ASSR of 6 July 1979 amended the Regulations on the state flag of the Chuvash ASSR, which was previously approved on 10 February 1956.

== Gallery ==
3 January 1927 - 31 March 1927

31 March 1927 - 12 February 1931

12 February 1931 - 19 May 1933

19 May 1933 - 18 July 1937
18 July 1937 - 11 June 1940

11 June 1940 - 6 May 1954

6 May 1954 - 26 October 1978

26 October 1978 - 24 October 1990

24 October 1990 (as the Chuvash SSR) - 29 April 1992 (adoption of the Flag of Chuvashia)
