= Flag of the Yakut Autonomous Soviet Socialist Republic =

Yakut Autonomous Soviet Socialist Republic
- Flag of the Yakut ASSR (1978–1990)
- Use: Civil and state flag
- Proportion: 1:2
- Adopted: 12 June 1954; 27 October 1978 (minor changes)
- Relinquished: 27 September 1990 (as the Yakut ASSR); 14 October 1992 (as the Yakut SSR)
- Design: A red flag with a light-blue stripe at the pole, with golden red star and hammer and sickle.
- Designed by: Valentin Petrovich Viktorov

The flag of the Yakut Autonomous Soviet Socialist Republic was adopted in 1954 by the government of the Yakut Autonomous Soviet Socialist Republic. The flag is identical to the flag of the Russian Soviet Federative Socialist Republic.

During the Korenizatsiya period, most of the autonomous republics of the USSR, including Yakut ASSR, were encouraged to create a flag to suit their national tradition. Yakutia itself adopted a flag which depicted Aurora on its canton during this period.

After 1937, the korenizatsiya policies were reversed. A new flag of the Yakut ASSR, which is similar to the flag of the Russian SFSR was adopted. The flag of Yakut ASSR is now a red flag with the inscriptions of the name of the republic.

== History ==
The first constitution of the Yakut ASSR was adopted by the 2nd session of the Central Executive Committee of the Yakut ASSR, on the third convocation, on 23 March 1925. The first constitution did not mentioned any design of flag.

=== First version ===
The first flag of the Yakut ASSR was described in the 1926 Constitution of the Yakut ASSR, which was approved on the 4th All-Yakutsk Congress of Soviets on 13 February 1926, and was introduced by resolution of the 2nd session of the Yakut Central Executive Committee on the 4th convocation of September 17, 1926. The design of the flag was contained in the Article 119 of the constitution:

The state flag of the Yakut Autonomous Soviet Socialist Republic consists of a red cloth, in the left corner of which at the hoist at the top on a light blue background is depicted the northern lights with the inscription in golden letters "ЯАССР" in the Yakut language [з.a.s.s.ꭢ].

— Constitution of the Yakut Autonomous Soviet Socialist Republic (1926), Article 119

=== Second version ===
The flag of the Yakut ASSR was described in the 1937 Constitution of the Yakut ASSR, which was adopted by the Central Executive Committee of the Yakut ASSR on 9 March 1937, at the 9th Extraordinary Congress of Soviets of the Yakut ASSR. The flag is described in Article 109 of the constitution :

The state flag of the Yakut Autonomous Soviet Socialist Republic is the national flag of the RSFSR, consisting of a red cloth, in the left corner of which at the top of the shaft, are placed the golden letters "RSFSR" in Russian and Yakut languages, with an additional inscription under the letters "RSFSR" of smaller letters — "SASSR", in Yakut language.

— Constitution of the Yakut Autonomous Soviet Socialist Republic (1937), Article 109

=== Third version ===
On March 23, 1939, a new alphabet for the Yakut language was approved by a decree of the People's Commissar of Education of the Soviet Union. The inscription on the flag was changed into the new Cyrillic alphabet, and the inscription "АССР" was written once, due to both language having the same abbreviation.

=== Fourth version ===
On June 12, 1954, by the decree of the Presidium of the Supreme Council of the Yakut ASSR "On the State Flag of the Yakut Autonomous Soviet Socialist Republic", a new state flag of the Yakut ASSR was adopted, which was approved by the Law of the Yakut ASSR of June 23, 1954. The law also amended Article 110 of the Constitution of the Yakut ASSR:

The state flag of the Yakut Autonomous Soviet Socialist Republic is the State flag of the RSFSR, consisting of a red cloth with a light blue stripe at the shaft in the entire width of the flag. The blue band is one eighth of the flag's length. In the upper left corner of the red cloth there are golden hammer and sickle and above the hammer and sickle is a red five-pointed star framed with a gold border. Under the hammer and sickle there are inscriptions "Sakha" in Yakut and "Yakutsk" in Russian and the general inscription "ASSR". The ratio of the width of the flag to the length of 1: 2.

— Constitution of the Yakut ASSR (1937, amended 1954), Article 110

On January 20, 1956, the Decree of the Supreme Soviet of the Yakut ASSR approved the Regulations on the State Flag of the Yakut Autonomous Soviet Socialist Republic. The regulation established the exact proportions and design of the flag.

On February 28, 1956, the Council of Ministers of the Yakut ASSR issued an instruction for the application of the Regulations on the State Flag of the Yakut ASSR.

=== Fifth version ===
A new constitution of the Yakut ASSR was adopted by the 8th extraordinary session of the Supreme Council of the Yakut ASSR on May 31, 1978. A new design of the flag was described in the constitution, of which the inscription on the flag was written in two lines, in Russian and Yakut. The article 158 of the constitution contains the design of the flag:

The state flag of the Yakut Autonomous Soviet Socialist Republic is the state flag of the RSFSR, which is a red rectangular cloth with a light blue stripe at the flagpole for the entire width of the flag, which is one eighth of the flag's length. In the upper left corner of the red cloth there are golden sickle and a hammer and above them a red five-pointed star framed by a golden border, and under them in golden letters the inscription “Yakut ASSR” in Russian and Yakut languages is placed. The ratio of the width of the flag to its length - 1: 2.

— Constitution of the Yakut Autonomous Soviet Socialist Republic (1978), Article 158

On October 27, 1978, the Presidium of the Supreme Council of the Yakut ASSR approved the new flag.

On October 26, 1979, by the decision of the Council of Ministers of Yakut ASSR No. 410, minor amendments were made to the instruction for the application of the Regulations on the State Flag of the Yakut ASSR.

== Gallery ==
13 February 1926 – 9 March 1937

9 March 1937 – 23 March 1939

23 March 1939 – 12 June 1954
12 June 1954 – 27 October 1978

27 October 1978 – 27 September 1990

27 September 1990 – 14 October 1992 (adoption of the Flag of the Sakha Republic)
