= Eduard Mochalov =

Russian businessman

- Эдуард Валерьевич Мочалов
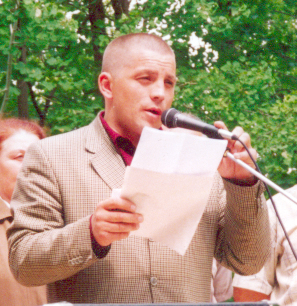
- Mochalov giving speech at a national festival Akatuy
- Born: August 22, 1974 (age 51); Ishterek, Chuvash ASSR

Eduard Mochalov is a former businessman from Russia who survived corporate raid on his business and took the path of a "crusading journalist", bringing to light numerous facts of corruption among local officials.

== Biography ==
His eccentric behaviour and performances brought him fame both on local and national level. Russian journalists often refer to him as the "Navalny of Chuvashia".

Mochalov is also a staunch supporter of his native Chuvash language which is listed in UNESCO Red Book of Endangered Languages as "vulnerable". His recent article in support of the language was qualified by the Supreme Court of Russia as an "incitement to ethnic or racial hatred towards Russians" despite a lower court acquitting him. Mochalov himself denies presented charges and regards criminal proceedings against him as politically motivated.
