= Flag of the Komi Autonomous Soviet Socialist Republic =

Komi Autonomous Soviet Socialist Republic
- Flag of the Komi ASSR (1954–1992)
- Use: Civil and state flag
- Proportion: 1:2
- Adopted: 23 July 1954
- Design: A red flag with a light-blue stripe at the pole, with golden red star and hammer and sickle.
- Designed by: Valentin Petrovich Viktorov

The flag of the Komi Autonomous Soviet Socialist Republic was adopted in 1954 by the government of the Komi Autonomous Soviet Socialist Republic. The flag is identical to the flag of the Russian Soviet Federative Socialist Republic.

== History ==
=== First version ===
The first flag of the Komi ASSR was described in the first Constitution of the Komi ASSR, which was adopted by the Central Executive Committee of the Komi ASSR on 26 May 1937, at the 11th Extraordinary Congress of Soviets of the Komi ASSR. The flag is described in Article 116 of the constitution :

The state flag of the Komi of the Autonomous Soviet Socialist Republic is the national flag of the RSFSR, consisting of a red cloth, in the left corner of which, at the top of the shaft, are placed the golden letters "RSFSR" in Russian and Komi languages, with the letters "RSFSR" under the inscription smaller size of the inscription "Komi ASSR" in Russian and Komi languages.

— Constitution of the Komi ASSR (1937), Article 116

=== Second version ===
On 1938, the writing system of the Komi language was changed. The Komi inscriptions on the flag, which previously used Latin Molodtsov alphabet, was changed into Cyrillic letters.

=== Third version ===
After the changes to the flag of the Russian SFSR in 1954, the flag of the Komi ASSR was accordingly changed. This was confirmed by the amendment to the Constitution of the Komi ASSR on 23 July 1954 by the Supreme Soviet of the Komi ASSR. The flag is now described in the Article 112 of the constitution :

The state flag of the Komi Autonomous Soviet Socialist Republic is the state flag of the RSFSR, consisting of a red cloth with a light blue stripe at the flagpole in the full width of the flag. The light blue bar is one eighth of the flag's length. In the upper left corner of the red cloth there are golden sickle and hammer and above them a red five-pointed star, framed by a golden border, with an inscription in golden letters under the image of a golden sickle and hammer "Komi ASSR" in Russian and Komi. The ratio of the width of the flag to the length of the flag is 1:2.

— Constitution of the Komi ASSR (1937; 1954 amendment), Article 112

On March 16, 1956, the Decree of the Presidium of the Supreme Council of the Komi ASSR approved the Regulations of the Flag of the Komi ASSR.

On May 23, 1978, the Extraordinary 8th Session of the Supreme Council of the Komi ASSR on the 9th convocation approved the new Constitution of the Komi ASSR. The flag of the Komi ASSR was described in Article 158. The design of the flag remained unchanged.

A new version of the Regulations of the Flag of the Komi ASSR was approved by the PVS with the decree on September 15, 1981, and the supplement to the Regulations was approved on September 18, 1984.

== Gallery ==
26 May 1937 - 1938

1938 - 23 July 1954

23 July 1954 - 27 November 1991 (adoption of the Flag of Komi)
