= Flag of the Bashkir Autonomous Soviet Socialist Republic =

Flags of the 1919–1992 Russian administrative division

Bashkir Autonomous Soviet Socialist Republic
- Flag of the Bashkir ASSR (1954–1992)
- Use: Civil and state flag
- Proportion: 1:2
- Adopted: 31 March 1954
- Design: A red flag with a light-blue stripe at the pole, with golden red star and hammer and sickle.
- Designed by: Valentin Petrovich Viktorov

The flag of the Bashkir Autonomous Soviet Socialist Republic was adopted in 1954 by the government of the Bashkir Autonomous Soviet Socialist Republic. The flag is identical to the flag of the Russian Soviet Federative Socialist Republic.

== History ==
=== First version ===
After the formation of the Bashkir ASSR on 23 March 1919 until the introduction of an official flag on 11 October 1924, a temporary flag was used. The flag was a red cloth with the inscription "А.Б.С.С.Р.", abbreviation of the Autonomous Bashkir SSR, in Bashkir and Russian.

=== Second version ===
In October 1924, on the basis of the decree of the Bashkir Central Election Commission, a Decree of the Bashkir Central Committee dated October 11, 1924, was approved. The decree, "On the change of the State flag of the BASSR", approved the first official state flag of the Autonomous Bashkir SSR. The flag was a rectangular red flag with a golden sickle and red five-pointed star with a gold border.

=== Third version ===
The flag of the Baskhir ASSR was described in the constitution of the Bashkir ASSR, which was adopted by the Central Executive Committee of the Baskhir ASSR on 23 June 1937, at the 10th Congress of the Soviets of the Bashkir ASSR on June 23, 1937. The flag of the Bashkir ASSR is described in Article 112 of the constitution :

The state flag of the Bashkir Autonomous Soviet Socialist Republic is the national flag of the RSFSR, consisting of a red cloth, in the left corner of which, at the top of the shaft, are placed the golden letters "RSFSR" in Russian and Bashkir languages with the inscription "Bashkir ASSR" in Russian and Bashkir languages.

— Constitution of the Bashkir ASSR (1937), Article 112

=== Fourth version ===
A new flag was approved by the Decree of the Presidium of the CEC of the Bashkir ASSR of February 9, 1938. The flag was changed in accordance to the conversion of the writing system of Bashkir language to Cyrillic alphabet.

=== Fifth version ===
In accordance to the change of the flag of the Russian SFSR, the government of the Bashkir ASSR approved a new flag on March 31, 1954. The flag was described in the amended constitution of the Bashkir ASSR. The flag of the Bashkir ASSR is described in Article 112 of the constitution :

The state flag of the Bashkir Autonomous Soviet Socialist Republic is the State flag of the RSFSR, consisting of a red cloth with a light blue stripe at the flagpole over the entire width of the flag. The light blue bar is one eighth of the flag's length. In the upper left corner of the red cloth there are golden sickle and hammer and a red five-pointed star framed with a gold border above them, and below the sickle and hammer there is an inscription in golden letters “Bashkir ASSR” in Russian and Bashkir language. The ratio of the width of the flag to the length is 1:2.

— Constitution of the Bashkir ASSR (1937, amended 1954), Article 112

The design was reconfirmed by the Decree of the State Flag of the Bashkir ASSR, which was approved by the PVS of the Bashkir ASSR on January 16, 1956. The decree standardized the usage and proportions of the flag. The decree was amended by the decree of the PVS of March 15, 1956 and the Decree of the VVS of September 22, 1966.

On May 30, 1978, the 8th extraordinary session of the Supreme Council of the Bashkir ASSR of the 9th convocation adopted a new Constitution of the Bashkir ASSR. The flag was described in Article 158 of the new constitution.

== Gallery ==
11 October 1924 – 23 June 1937

23 June 1937 – 9 February 1938
9 February 1938 – 1947

1947 – 31 March 1954

31 March 1954 – 25 February 1992 (adoption of the Flag of Bashkortostan)
