= Daniel Elmen =

Chuvash politician (1885–1932)

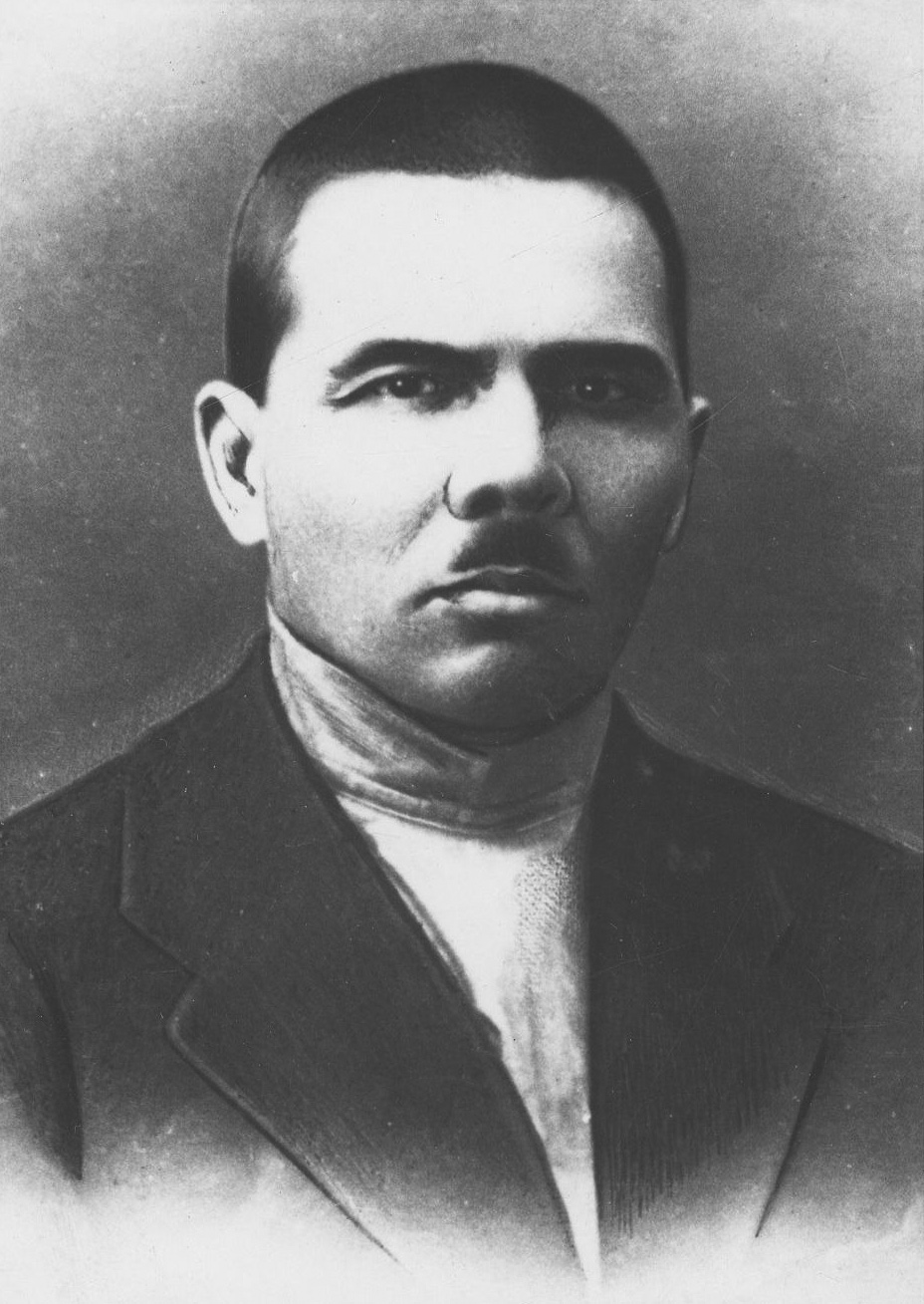
Image of Daniel Elmen

Daniel Elmen (Chuvash: Даниил Элмен, born Daniil Semyonov; December 29, 1885, Ismender, Yadrinsky Uyezd, Kazan Governorate, Russian Empire – September 3, 1932, Ilyinka, Chuvash ASSR, USSR) was a Chuvash state and political figure, the first Chairman of the Chuvash regional executive committee (1920–1921). Elmen contributed to the development of public education and cultural institutions in Chuvashia.

== Literature ==
- Ivanov, M. I. (2009). Daniil Ėlʹmenʹ: ostrye grani sudʹby. Cheboksary: Chuvashskoe knizhnoe izdatelʹstvo. ISBN 978-5-7670-1733-1. OCLC 830672730.
- Николаев В. Н., Лялина Л. В. Д. С. Эльмень (Семенов). Его роль в становлении и развитии Чувашской национальной государственности. Cheboksary, 2008.
