= Kabardino-Balkarian Autonomous Soviet Socialist Republic =

Entity within the Russian SFSR

Coordinates: 43°35′N 43°24′E

Kabardino-Balkarian Autonomous Soviet Socialist Republic Кабардино-Балкарская Автономная Советская Социалистическая Республика (Russian) Къэбэрдей-Балъкъэр Автоном Совет Социал Республикэ (Kabardian) Къабарты-Малкъар Автоном Совет Социалист Республика (Karachay-Balkar)
- ASSR of the Russian SFSR; Republic of the Russian Federation
- 1936–1992
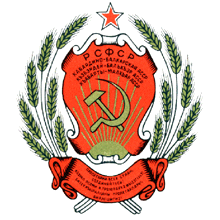
- Flag (1978–1991) Emblem (1978–1992)

- Location of Kabardino-Balkarian ASSR within Russian SFSR
- Capital: Nalchik
- Government
  - Type: Soviet republic
  - Motto: Къэрал псоми я пролетархэ, фызэгухъэ! (Kabardian); Битеу къыралланы пролетарлары, бирлешигиз! (Karachay-Balkar) "Workers of the world, unite!"
- History
  - Established: 5 December 1936
  - Kabardin ASSR: 8 April 1944
  - Name restored: 11 February 1957
  - Sovereignty declared (Renamed to the Kabardino-Balkarian SSR): 31 January 1991
  - Renamed to the Kabardino-Balkarian Republic: 16 May 1992
Preceded by	Succeeded by
Kabardino-Balkarian AO	Kabardino-Balkaria

The Kabardino-Balkarian Autonomous Soviet Socialist Republic was an autonomous republic of the Russian Soviet Federative Socialist Republic within the Soviet Union, and was originally a part of the Mountain Autonomous Soviet Socialist Republic. On 16 January 1922 the region was detached from the Mountain ASSR and the Kabardino-Balkarian Autonomous Oblast on 1 September 1921. It became an autonomous republic on 5 December 1936. On 30 January 1991, the Kabardino-Balkarian ASSR declared state sovereignty. It is now the Kabardino-Balkaria republic, a federal subject of the Russian Federation. The Kabardino-Balkarian ASSR bordered no other sovereign states during the existence of the Soviet Union.

Like the Chechen-Ingush Autonomous Soviet Socialist Republic, the Kabardino-Balkarian ASSR was shared by two nationalities. Both autonomous republics resided as part of the Russian Soviet Federative Socialist Republic and featured Russians as the ethnic majority.

== History ==
The Russian, Ottoman and Persian Empires fought for the region between the 17th and 19th centuries, during which the region was under Russian control. After the October Revolution, the region joined the Mountain Autonomous Soviet Socialist Republic in 1921, during the Russian Civil War. The territories were detached from the Mountain ASSR to the Kabardino-Balkarian Autonomous Oblast in 1922, and on 5 December 1936 it was transformed into the Kabardino-Balkarian Autonomous Soviet Socialist Republic.

In 8 April 1944, Joseph Stalin accused the Balkars of cooperating with Nazi Germany, men of military age suspected of being collaborators were deported to internment camps in Central Asia. Balkar lands were incorporated into Kabardin ASSR except for Baksan valley which was ceded to the Georgian SSR. After the end of war, most of those interned were allowed to return, except those who actually were involved in anti-Soviet conspiracies. In 11 February 1957, the original name of Balkar-Kabardin ASSR was restored.

== Geography ==
The Kabardino-Balkarian Autonomous Soviet Socialist Republic was located in the North Caucasus mountains. It covered an area of 12,500 km^{2} (4,800 sq mi).

=== Rivers ===
The main rivers include the Terek River (623 km), Malka River (216 km), Baksan River (173 km), Urukh River (104 km), and Cherek River (76 km).

=== Lakes ===
An area of 18,740 km^{2} (7,240 sq mi) is covered solely by river basins. More than 100 lakes are located in the borders, although none of them has very large surface area. Most of the lakes are located in the mountains, formed by glacial processes. Lakes located on a plain include Tambukan Lake.

=== Mountains ===
Mount Elbrus (5,642 m) is volcanic and the highest peak in the Caucasus.

Other major mountains include Mount Dykhtau (5,402 m), Mount Koshkhatau (5,151 m), and Mount Shkhara (5,068 m).

=== Resources ===
Along with timber, the mining of minerals such as iron, molybdenum, gold, coal, tungsten, and lead were a main industry in the Kabardino-Balkarian ASSR. The region also has a great abundance of mineral water.

== See also ==
- Kabardino-Balkarian Regional Committee of the Communist Party of the Soviet Union
- Flag of the Kabardino-Balkarian Autonomous Soviet Socialist Republic
