= Chuvash Autonomous Soviet Socialist Republic =

Autonomous republic within the Russian SFSR

Coordinates: 56.1333°N 47.2333°E

Chuvash Autonomous Soviet Socialist Republic Чӑваш АССР (Chuvash) Чувашская АССР (Russian)
- ASSR of the Russian SFSR; Republic of the Russian Federation
- 1925–1992
- Flag (1978–1990) Emblem (1978–1992)

- Map of the Chuvash ASSR, the same territory as the Chuvash Republic in Russia today
- Capital: Cheboksary
  - Type: Soviet republic
- History
  - Established: 21 April 1925
  - Sovereignty declared (Renamed to the Chuvash SSR): 24 October 1990
  - Renamed to the Chuvash Republic: 13 February 1992
| Preceded by | Succeeded by |
| Chuvash AO | Chuvashia |
- Today part of: Russia

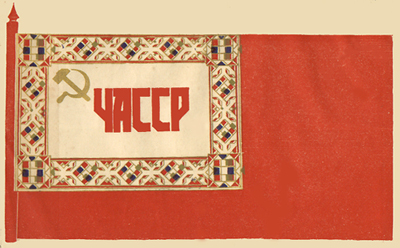
Flag used 1927–31

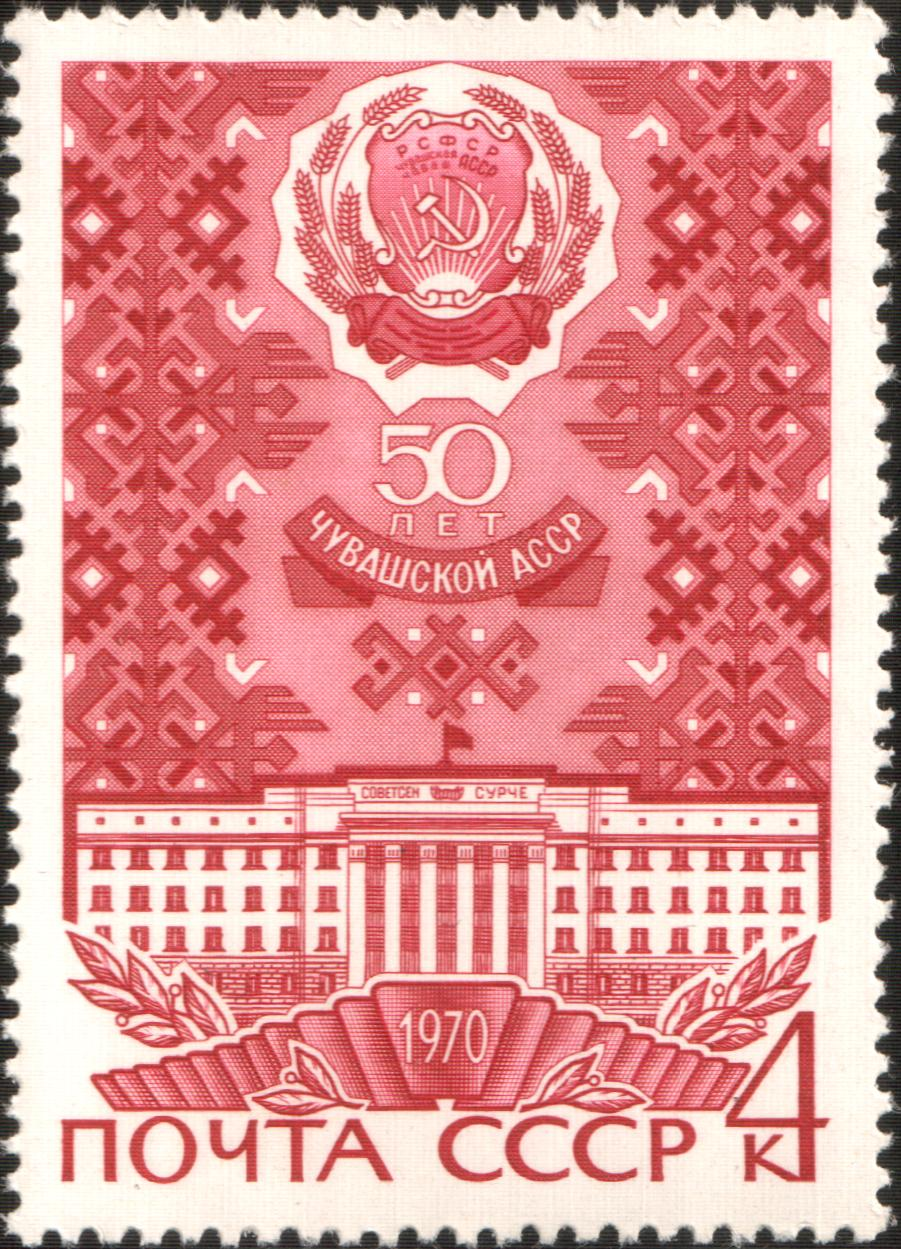
Stamp marking the 50th anniversary of the Chuvash AO/ASSR

The Chuvash Autonomous Soviet Socialist Republic (Note: Chuvash: Чӑваш Автономлӑ Совет Социаллӑ Республики, romanized: Çăvaş Avtonomlă Sovet Sotsiallă Respubliki; Russian: Чувашская Автономная Советская Социалистическая Республика, romanized: Chuvashskaya Avtonomnaya Sovetskaya Sotsialisticheskaya Respublika) was an autonomous republic of the Russian SFSR within the Soviet Union.

It occupied about 18,000 square kilometres (6,900 square miles) along the east bank of the Volga River, about 60 kilometres (37 miles) west of the river's confluence with the Kama River and some 700 kilometres (430 miles) east of Moscow.

The successor of the Chuvash Autonomous Oblast, the Chuvash ASSR was formed in 21 April 1925. It declared its sovereignty within the Soviet Union on October 24, 1990 as the Chuvash Soviet Socialist Republic.

Its primary economic activities were agricultural. Grain and fruit production and logging were emphasized. The capital city was Cheboksary.

== Notable people ==
- Eduard Mochalov (born 1974), journalist and former businessman

== See also ==
- Chuvash Autonomous Oblast
- Chuvashia
- Chuvash Regional Committee of the Communist Party of the Soviet Union
- Flag of the Chuvash Autonomous Soviet Socialist Republic
