= Administrative divisions of Stavropol Krai =

Administrative districts of Russian federal subject

Stavropol Krai Russia
- Administrative center: Stavropol

Administrative structure (as of 2013)
- Districts: 26
- Cities/towns: 10 (krai subordinance); 9 (raion subordinance)
- Urban-type settlements: 7
- Selsovets: 284

Municipal structure (as of 2002)
- Rural settlements: 736 (inhabited); 5 (uninhabited)

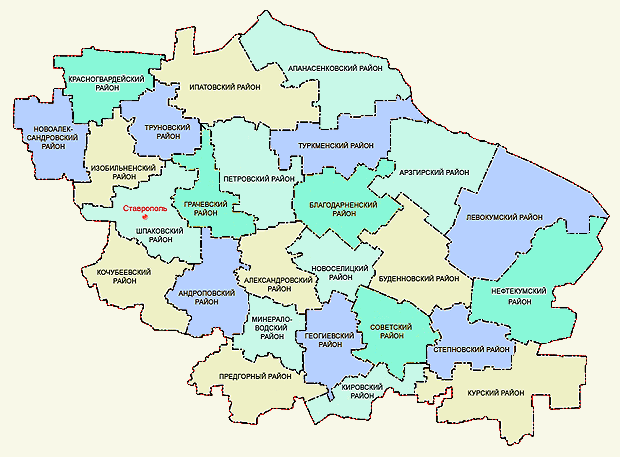
Map of administrative divisions of Stavropol Krai

Stavropol Krai is a federal subject of Russia.

== Administrative and municipal divisions ==
- Cities and towns under the krai's jurisdiction:
  - Stavropol (Ставрополь) (administrative center)
    - city districts:
      - Leninsky (Ленинский)
      - Oktyabrsky (Октябрьский)
      - Promyshlenny (Промышленный)
  - Budyonnovsk (Будённовск)
  - Georgiyevsk (Георгиевск)
  - Kislovodsk (Кисловодск)
    - with 1 selsovet under the city's jurisdiction.
  - Lermontov (Лермонтов)
  - Mineralnye Vody (Минеральные Воды)
    - Urban-type settlements under the town's jurisdiction:
      - Andzhiyevsky (Анджиевский)
    - with 1 selsovet under the town's jurisdiction.
  - Nevinnomyssk (Невинномысск)
  - Pyatigorsk (Пятигорск)
    - Urban-type settlements under the city's jurisdiction:
      - Goryachevodsky (Горячеводский)
      - Svobody (Свободы)
    - with 2 selsovets under the city's jurisdiction.
  - Yessentuki (Ессентуки)
  - Zheleznovodsk (Железноводск)
    - Urban-type settlements under the town's jurisdiction:
      - Inozemtsevo resort settlement (Иноземцево)
- Districts:
  - Alexandrovsky (Александровский)
    - with 8 selsovets under the district's jurisdiction.
  - Andropovsky (Андроповский)
    - with 11 selsovets under the district's jurisdiction.
  - Apanasenkovsky (Апанасенковский)
    - with 11 selsovets under the district's jurisdiction.
  - Arzgirsky (Арзгирский)
    - with 8 selsovets under the district's jurisdiction.
  - Blagodarnensky (Благодарненский)
    - Towns under the district's jurisdiction:
      - Blagodarny (Благодарный)
    - with 13 selsovets under the district's jurisdiction.
  - Budyonnovsky (Будённовский)
    - with 13 selsovets under the district's jurisdiction.
  - Georgiyevsky (Георгиевский)
    - with 14 selsovets under the district's jurisdiction.
  - Grachyovsky (Грачёвский)
    - with 8 selsovets under the district's jurisdiction.
  - Ipatovsky (Ипатовский)
    - Towns under the district's jurisdiction:
      - Ipatovo (Ипатово)
    - with 15 selsovets under the district's jurisdiction.
  - Izobilnensky (Изобильненский)
    - Towns under the district's jurisdiction:
      - Izobilny (Изобильный)
    - Urban-type settlements under the district's jurisdiction:
      - Ryzdvyany (Рыздвяный)
      - Solnechnodolsk (Солнечнодольск)
    - with 12 selsovets under the district's jurisdiction.
  - Kirovsky (Кировский)
    - Towns under the district's jurisdiction:
      - Novopavlovsk (Новопавловск)
    - with 9 selsovets under the district's jurisdiction.
  - Kochubeyevsky (Кочубеевский)
    - with 15 selsovets under the district's jurisdiction.
  - Krasnogvardeysky (Красногвардейский)
    - with 11 selsovets under the district's jurisdiction.
  - Kursky (Курский)
    - with 12 selsovets under the district's jurisdiction.
  - Levokumsky (Левокумский)
    - with 11 selsovets under the district's jurisdiction.
  - Mineralovodsky (Минераловодский)
    - with 12 selsovets under the district's jurisdiction.
  - Neftekumsky (Нефтекумский)
    - Towns under the district's jurisdiction:
      - Neftekumsk (Нефтекумск)
    - Urban-type settlements under the district's jurisdiction:
      - Zaterechny (Затеречный)
    - with 10 selsovets under the district's jurisdiction.
  - Novoalexandrovsky (Новоалександровский)
    - Towns under the district's jurisdiction:
      - Novoalexandrovsk (Новоалександровск)
    - with 11 selsovets under the district's jurisdiction.
  - Novoselitsky (Новоселицкий)
    - with 8 selsovets under the district's jurisdiction.
  - Petrovsky (Петровский)
    - Towns under the district's jurisdiction:
      - Svetlograd (Светлоград)
    - with 12 selsovets under the district's jurisdiction.
  - Predgorny (Предгорный)
    - with 15 selsovets under the district's jurisdiction.
  - Shpakovsky (Шпаковский)
    - Towns under the district's jurisdiction:
      - Mikhaylovsk (Михайловск)
    - with 11 selsovets under the district's jurisdiction.
  - Sovetsky (Советский)
    - Towns under the district's jurisdiction:
      - Zelenokumsk (Зеленокумск)
    - with 6 selsovets under the district's jurisdiction.
  - Stepnovsky (Степновский)
    - with 7 selsovets under the district's jurisdiction.
  - Trunovsky (Труновский)
    - with 6 selsovets under the district's jurisdiction.
  - Turkmensky (Туркменский)
    - with 11 selsovets under the district's jurisdiction.
