= Etoka =

Etoka may refer to:

- Taski Etoka, a leader of Chickasaw (Native American people)
- Etoka, Russia, a village (selo) in Stavropol Krai, Russia
- Etoka (river), a mountain creek in Stavropol Krai, Russia

== See also ==
- Etoko (disambiguation)
