= Battle of Afips (1570) =

Crimean-Circassian War (1570)
- Part of Crimean–Circassian wars
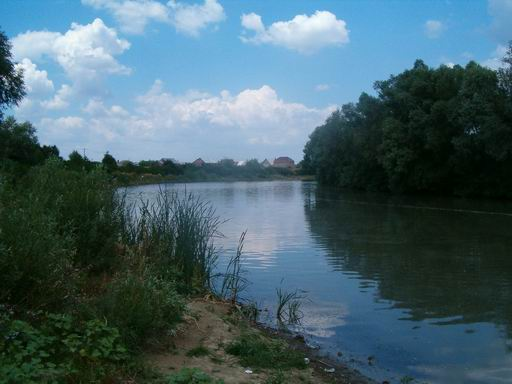
- A view of the Afips river in 2007
Date	July 1570
Location	Afips river
Result	See § Result and aftermath

Belligerents
Crimean Khanate	Western Circassia; Chemguys; Kabardia (East Circassia); Abazins

Commanders and leaders
Devlet I Giray; Adil Giray	Temruqo (DOW); Yidar Tambiy; Qaytaq Yetlukh; Mamstruk (POW); Beberyuk (POW)

Strength
Low estimates:~20,000 High estimates:130,000+	Large but less

Casualties and losses
Very heavy	Very heavy

The Battle of Afips River was a military conflict between the Crimean Khanate against the Kabardian princedom and western Circassia, during which the famous Kabardian prince Temruqo Idar died

== Background ==
In the summer of 1569, the Ottomans launched a war against Russia, the first in a long series of conflicts between the two powers. A massive combined Ottoman–Crimean army, which contemporary Russian sources claim numbered up to 130,000 men, set out on a campaign against Astrakhan, under the command of Kasim Bey. The main objectives of the campaign were to “open the Astrakhan road” and to abandon the city built on the Terek (Terki). Both the Ottoman Empire and the Crimean Khanate attached great importance to the expedition, as its success would have disrupted Russia’s connections with the Caucasus and Central Asia and expelled Russian influence from the Ciscaucasia and the lower Volga. This, in turn, would have granted the Ottomans and the Crimeans significant strategic advantages in their struggle against both Iran and Russia.

Despite careful preparation, the campaign ended in failure. Kabardian cavalry took part in defeating the retreating Ottoman–Crimean forces, and sources emphasize that the retreat cost the Turks far greater losses than the campaign itself. By 24 October, only about one-third of the Ottoman troops had reached Azov. The remnants were loaded onto seagoing vessels and sent to Kaffa, but many ships were wrecked during a storm, resulting in heavy losses by drowning. According to the Russian ambassador to the Ottoman Empire, I. P. Novosiltsev, no more than 700 men from the Ottoman army ultimately returned to Constantinople.

After Temruqo Idar’s Kabardian forces routed the retreating Ottoman–Crimean troops, the Crimean prince Adil Giray seized the opportunity to launch an attack against the western Adyghe. On 17 June 1570, he attacked the Chemguy tribe but was defeated. He then advanced deeper into Circassian territory and attacked the lands of the so-called “Baazyt Circassians”, whom Shora Nogmov identified as the Abazins. Modern scholarship, however, based on the geographical context of the battle, considers it more likely that these were Bzhedug lands.

== Battle ==
Nogmov further states that Crimean Khan Devlet I Giray assembled an army with the aim of completely exterminating the Pyatigorsk Kabardians. Prince Temruqo Idar, having gathered a large force of Kabardians and other Adyghe tribes, advanced to the Akhupa River and, at its confluence with the Kuban, constructed a fortress where he awaited the enemy. Nogmov’s account contains inconsistencies, as he attributes command of the invading army to Devlet I Giray, while Russian sources identify Kalga Adil Giray as the commander. Estimates of the Crimean force vary widely: some sources place it at no fewer than 20,000 men, while higher estimates—including reinforcements from Astrakhan and Kazan Tatars—raise the figure to as many as 130,000. Even so, the force was relatively small compared to other Crimean campaigns during Devlet Giray’s reign, as Adil Giray was operating primarily with troops from his own appanage. The Circassians’ reliance on defensive tactics further suggests that they were numerically inferior.

The battle took place on the Afips River in July 1570; the earliest Russian ambassadorial reports date it to 30 July. According to Circassian folklore, the Tatar commander was enraged upon seeing that Temruqo Idar was aiding the Circassians. The same tradition emphasizes the brutality of the fighting, claiming that Tatar arrows “fell like snow” and struck with the force of cannon fire. During the battle, one such arrow pierced Temruqo, inflicting a mortal wound, while the fortress he had built was captured by the Tatars. Despite his injury, Temruqo continued to fight, and repeated Crimean attempts to cross the river were repelled. Nevertheless, two of his sons, Beberyuk and Mamstruk, were captured by the Tatars.

The following Circassian song was composed in connection with these events:

Seven days passed in anticipation of the enemy, and nothing was seen or heard in the steppe. Our army stood idle on the waters of the Akhunsa.

Thanks to the good king; he informed us of the enemy’s approach, and the valiant prince Temruqo is ready to strike the common enemy.

A cruel battle flared up and Crimean arrows flew at Temruqo, like winter frost whitening the fields and trees.

But one fatal arrow found a way to pierce the brave prince and the wound was so deep that it was difficult to remove it.

A formidable warrior with countless forces came to us from a distant land, from across the sea through the isthmus, and took our fortress. The Crimeans tried hard to cross the Akhups and completely dislodge ours; it was bad without brave Temruqo, but ours held out.

And Kaidak Etlukhov with his golden mustache distinguished himself with courage; the hero of heroes Temruqo only sighed from a cruel wound. Idar Tambiev, noticing our men's timidity, charged into the enemy's midst.

From the thickness of the bow came a sound like a gun, and from the fired arrow the bowstring rang. Upon his recovery, Prince Temruqo immediately gathered the Kabardians and hastened to the aid of the Russian Tsar, with whom they joined forces near the Sea of Azov. The Tsar greatly thanked Prince Temruqo for his loyalty and generously rewarded the Kabardians.

In this way, Prince Temruqo helped Russia many times; upon his return to his homeland, this kind, brave, and best of all our princes died of an old wound that had relapsed. The people said of him: “There is no greater valiant hero, no more courageous knight of ours, Prince Temruqo.”

== Result and aftermath ==
According to Nogmov, the Circassians themselves did not regard the engagement as a clear or decisive battlefield victory in the conventional sense. Nevertheless, he emphasizes that they believed they had effectively "deprived [the enemy] of any hope of doing so", a formulation which strongly suggests that, even in the absence of an outright triumph, the Circassian forces succeeded in inflicting severe and demoralizing losses upon the Tatar troops. From this perspective, the outcome was interpreted less as a failure and more as a strategic success that rendered further enemy advances impractical or unrealistic. The assessment of the battle’s result varies considerably among later historians and modern sources. Some accounts explicitly characterize the engagement as a defeat for the Circassian coalition, arguing that the losses sustained outweighed any immediate tactical gains and that the coalition failed to secure a decisive advantage. In contrast, other historians maintain that, despite suffering heavy casualties and enduring significant hardship, the Circassians ultimately managed to force the enemy to withdraw, thereby achieving the practical objective of expelling opposing forces from the contested area.

A further group of sources adopts a more cautious and nuanced position, suggesting that the battle’s military outcome may best be described as inconclusive. From this viewpoint, neither side emerged with an unquestionable victory, and the engagement failed to produce a clear, decisive shift in the balance of power. However, even these accounts acknowledge that, irrespective of the ambiguous tactical result, the battle had far-reaching and deeply tragic consequences, particularly for the ruling elite. Most notably, the aftermath proved catastrophic for the family of Temruqo Idar. Several sources report that Temruqo lost two of his sons during the fighting, a blow that not only had personal significance but also weakened his dynastic and political position. Moreover, Temruqo himself is said to have been grievously wounded in the course of the battle and later died as a result of those injuries, transforming an already costly and disputed engagement into a profound personal and dynastic disaster.
