= Shora Nogmov =

Kabardian educator, linguist, and historian

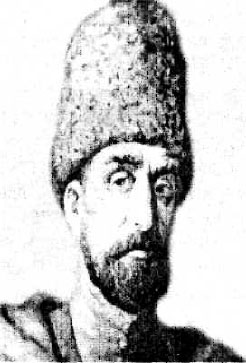
- Native name: Нэгумэ Шорэ
- Born: 5 October 1794 In a village on Dzhitsu River, near Pyatigorsk
- Died: 10 June 1844 (aged 49) Saint Petersburg, Russian Empire
- Occupation: public figure, educator, teacher, military serviceman, ethnographer, philologist, poet
- Citizenship: Russian Empire
- Notable works: History of the Adyghe People
- Partner: Salimat
- Children: Yerustan; Nago; Erivan; Irishid; Kuladam

Shora Bekmurzovich Nogmov (Russian: Шора Бекмурзович Ногмов; Kabardian: Нэгумэ Бэчмырзэ и къуэ Шорэ; October 5, 1794, Pyatigorsk — June 10, 1844, Saint Petersburg) was a Kabardian (East Circassian) public figure, educator, ethnographer, philologist and poet.

== Biography ==
He was born in a village on the Dzhitsu River, near Pyatigorsk. Upon graduating from the religious school in the village of Endirey, Nogmov refused to be ordained as a mullah and instead entered service in the Russian army. At that time, army service provided opportunities for career growth, obtaining a good education, and social advancement. He served as a translator, and later, from 1824, as a regimental clerk. His aptitude for languages earned him respect and attracted the interest of the command. The Pushkin-era poet S. D. Nechayev, who met Nogmov in 1825 at Goryachiye Vody, noted that he was "endowed with fortunate abilities," and "spoke Arabic, Turkish, Persian, Russian, and Abaza languages".

In 1828, Nogmov was sent to the Nalchik fortress, where he taught the Russian and Turkish languages. From 1830 to 1835, he served in the Caucasian-Mountain Half-Squadron in Petersburg. Participating in the November Uprising, he was promoted to cornet. In 1836, Nogmov, holding the rank of poruchik, was transferred to the Special Caucasian Corps, whose headquarters was stationed in Tblisi. Here he met academician A. Sjögren, who became his academic advisor in the field of linguistics. In 1838, Nogmov was appointed as the secretary of the Kabardian Provisional Court.

In 1844, having prepared his works for publication, Nogmov arrived in Petersburg to discuss them at the Russian Academy of Sciences. However, before he could do so, he died on June 10, 1844, in Petersburg.

== Work and activities ==
In the first half of the 1830s, he began working on a grammar of the Kabardian language. Also in Petersburg, Nogmov met with the renowned French orientalist scholar, corresponding member of the Russian Academy of Sciences, and professor François-Bernard Charmoy, who headed the Persian language department at Saint Petersburg University. His studies with Nogmov sparked great interest in the Circassian languages, so upon returning to France in 1835, he took one copy of Nogmov's manuscript to publish it in Paris.

Around 1838, Nogmov wrote the book "History of the Adyghe People," where for the first time in the history of the Circassians, an attempt was made to scientifically systematize information about the Circassians themselves. In this book, he rather freely categorized certain peoples (starting from ancient times) as Adyghe.

In 1840, Nogmov completed his work, "Initial Rules of the Adyghe Grammar". This was the first development of the grammar of their native language in the history of the Circassians. Shortly after, Nogmov finished the "Kabardian-Russian Dictionary," which included over four thousand words.

While working as the secretary of the Kabardian Provisional Court, Nogmov tried to introduce advanced technologies and methods into the region's economic and business activities. He supported opportunities for vocational education, teaching trades, introducing new agricultural crops; he took an active part in selecting candidates for Petersburg military institutions, and into the Tsar's escort, the Caucasian-Mountain Half-Squadron. He also intended to open a school in Nalchik with instruction in the Kabardian-Circassian language.

== Criticism ==
Some of his conclusions regarding the attribution of certain ethnonyms to the Circassians were criticized as early as the 19th century. For example, in 1867, in the article "Essays on the Ethnography of the Caucasus," E. P. Kovalevsky declared the conclusions about the ethnonyms Antes and Jiks (Dzhigi) to be scientifically unfounded. While the attribution of the ethnonym Jiks to Circassians is currently rarely disputed, it has now been established that the Antes tribe is of Sarmatian (Eastern Iranian) origin and inhabited the region of the Black Sea steppes. Later, the Antes were assimilated by the Slavs.

== Family ==
He was married to Salimat Asmalovna (Ismailovna) (married since 1819).

???	Bekmurza; Nogmov
Salimat; Asmalovna (Ismailovna)	Shora; Nogmov
Yerustan (1827–1904)	Nago; Magometovna; Adzhiyeva	Erivan (1838 — ?)	Irishid (1839 — ?)	???	Kuladam (1825 — ?)	Almov; Sholokh; Dagazovich
Shamgun (?—1918(9))	Kuko	Batyrbek (1861)	Khura (?—1892)	Khazhi Smail (1864 — ?)
Shora (1910–1923)	Khamid; Bizhev (1920–01.1944)	Tauzhan; Gilostanovna; Zhirikova	Fatima (1892–1922)	Karachay; Misostovich; Blayev (04.04.1890 — 26.07.1937)
Valentin (17.08.1940)	Nina (10.05.1941)	Fuza (1915–1992)	Vasily; Nikolayevich; Timofeyev (?—1992)	Lyana (1917–1992)	Zalim-Geriy; Shautsukov (1916–1990)
Adil; Vasilyevich; Timofeyev (17.08.1944—06.05.2014)	Leyla; Zalim-Geriyevna; Shautsukova	Laura; Zalim-Geriyevna; Shautsukova

== Legacy ==
- Monuments erected:
  - in Prokhladny, KBR.
  - in Maykop, Republic of Adygea.
  - in the village of Zayukovo, KBR.
- Streets named after him:
  - in KBR: Nalchik, Baksan, Prokhladny, Terek, villages of Kamennomostskoye, Chegem-Vtoroy, Zalukokoazhe, Urukh, Etoko.
  - in Maykop, Republic of Adygea.
- Lanes named after him:
  - in the village of Lechinkay, KBR.

== Publications ==
Legends of the Circassian People (History of the Adyghe People) (1817–1843) :

- About Kabardia. Essays // newspaper "Zakavkazsky Vestnik", 1847. — No. 4(21) [selections]
- On the everyday life, morals and customs of the ancient Adyghe peoples or Circassian tribes (from the manuscript of Shakh-Bekmurzin) // newspaper "Kavkaz", 1849. — No. 36, 37, 143, 144, 146—148[selections]
- History of the Adyghe People: Compiled from the legends of the Kabardians. — Tiflis: Printing House of the Main Administration of the Viceroy of the Caucasus, 1861. — 178 p.
  - History of the Adyghe People: Compiled from the legends of the Kabardians. / Ed. by A. P. Berzhe. — 2nd ed., expanded. — Tiflis: Printing House of the Main Administration of the Viceroy of the Caucasus, 1861. — 176, VIII p. — (Caucasian Calendar for 1892)
  - History of the Adyghe People, compiled from the legends of the Kabardians by Shora-Bekmurzin-Nogmov, supplemented with a preface and corrected by his son Yerust.-Shora-Bekmurzin-Nogmov. — 3rd ed., expanded. — Pyatigorsk: Yerustan-Shora-Bekmurzin-Nogmov, I. P. Afanasyev's Printing House, 1891. — 144 p.
  - History of the Adyghe People: Compiled from the legends of the Kabardians. / Intro., notes and index by G. Kokiev. — 5th ed. — Nalchik: Kabgosizdat, 1947. — 160 p.
  - History of the Adyghe People. / Ed. by B. Gardanov, T. Kumykov, I. Treskov. — 6th ed. — Nalchik: Kab.-Balk. Book Publishing House, 1958. — 240 p.
  - History of the Adyghe People: Compiled from the legends of the Kabardians. / Intro. article and text preparation by T. Kh. Kumykov. — Nalchik: Elbrus, 1982. — 166 p.
  - History of the Adyghe People: Compiled from the legends of the Kabardians. / Intro. article and text preparation by T. Kh. Kumykov. — Nalchik: Elbrus, 1994. — 231, [1] p. — ISBN 5-7680-0850-0, ISBN 978-5-7680-0850-5
  - History of the Adyghe People. — Maykop: Newspaper-Publishing Complex "Blagodareniye", 1994. — 112, [1] p.
  - History of the Adyghe People. — [reprint] —
  - Book on Demand, 2011. — 146 p. — ISBN 978-5-458-14629-6
- Die Sagen und Lieder des Tscherkessen-Volks. / Bearbeitet und mit einer Vorrede versehen von A. P. Berge. — Leipzig: O. Wigand, 1866. — xxxi, 144 p.
- History of the Adyghe People, told by old traditions of Kabardians / Gardanov B. A., Kumykov T. Kh., Treskov I. V. Ed. by: translated into Circassian by Kardangush Z. P. — Nalchik: Kab.-Balk. Book Publishing House, 1958 (Kabard.-Circass.)

== Bibliography ==
- Nechayev S. Excerpts from travel notes about South-Eastern Russia. M.: Telegraph, 1826.
- Berzhe A. Preface // History of the Adyghe People. Nogmov Shora Bekmurzin. Tiflis, 1861.
- Treskov I. Lamp of Life. Etudes about Shora Nogmov. Nalchik, 1966; expanded ed. 1974.
- Khashkhozheva R. Shora Nogmov // Adyghe educators of the 19th — early 20th centuries. Nalchik, 1993. pp. 16–24.
- Sh. B. Nogmov: Collection of documentation and articles for the 100th anniversary of his death. Nalchik, 1944.
