= Zaterechny =

Zaterechny may refer to:

- Zaterechny (urban-type settlement), an urban-type settlement in Stavropol Krai, Russia
- Zaterechny City District, a city district of Vladikavkaz, Republic of North Ossetia-Alania, Russia
