= Etoka, Russia =

Etoka Этока
- Rural locality
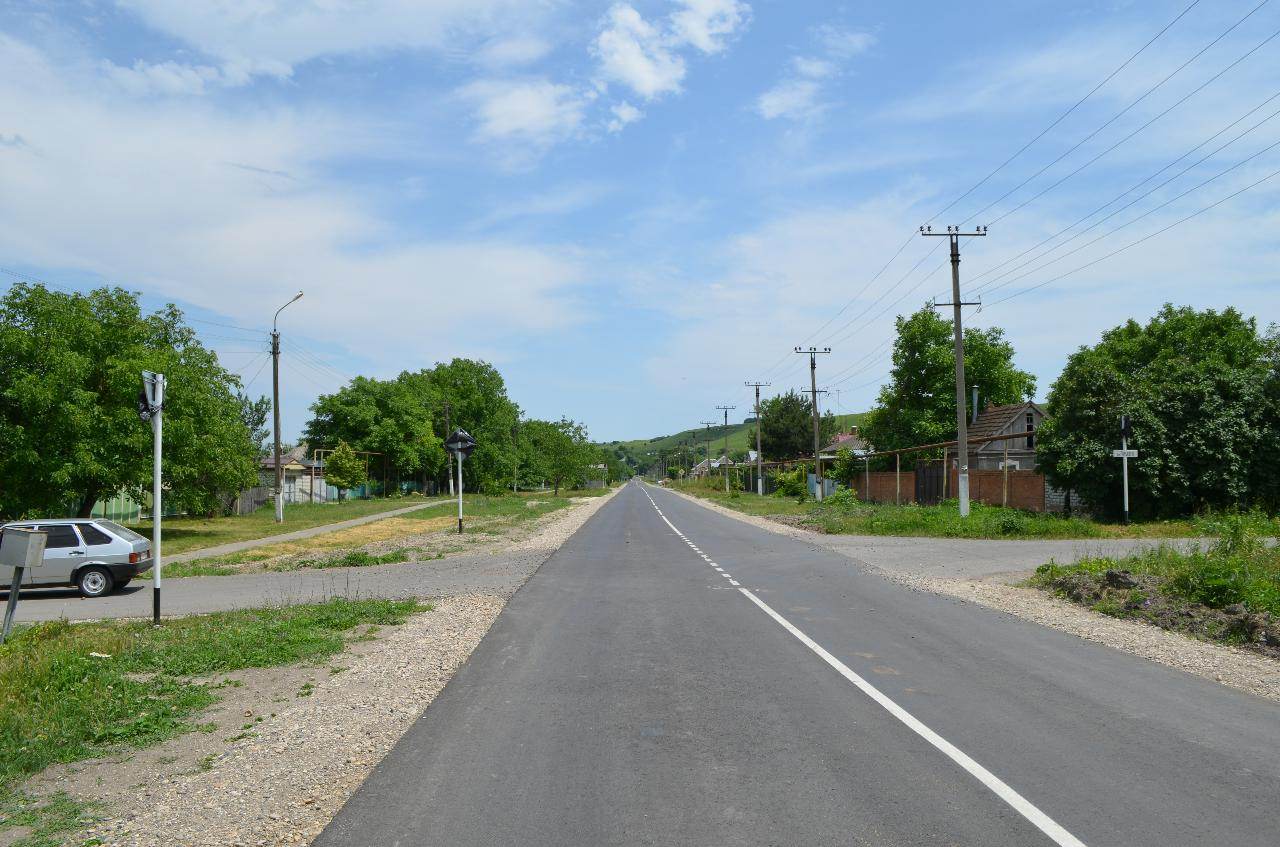
- Street of Etoka

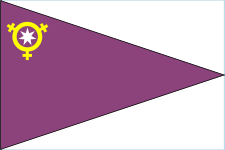
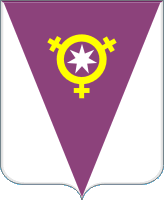
- Flag Coat of arms
- Interactive map of Etoka
- Location of Etoka Etoka (European Russia) Etoka (Russia)
- Coordinates: 43°55′N 43°03′E
- Country: Russia
- Federal subject: Stavropol Krai

Population
  - Estimate (2021): 2,485 )
- Time zone: UTC+3 (MSK)
- Postal codes: 357353, 357354
- OKTMO ID: 07648434101

Etoka (Russian: Этока) is a rural locality (selo) in Predgorny District of Stavropol Krai, Russia, located 2 kilometers (1.2 mi) south of Lake Tambukan, by the Etoka River, by the foot of the Mount Dzhutsa. Population is about 3,600 (2007 est.).

It was established in the early 19th century as the khutor of Sablya (Са́бля). Present name was given to the village around 1897–1899. The name is derived from the Kabardian/Adyghe languages, where it means "mud valley".

== Demographics ==
Distribution of the population by ethnicity according to the 2021 census:

	percent
Russians	59.07%
Armenians	30.54%
Yazidis	4.99%
Dargins	1.61%
Azeris	1.21%
Laks	0.44%
