= Zheleznovodsk =

Zheleznovodsk Железноводск
- Town
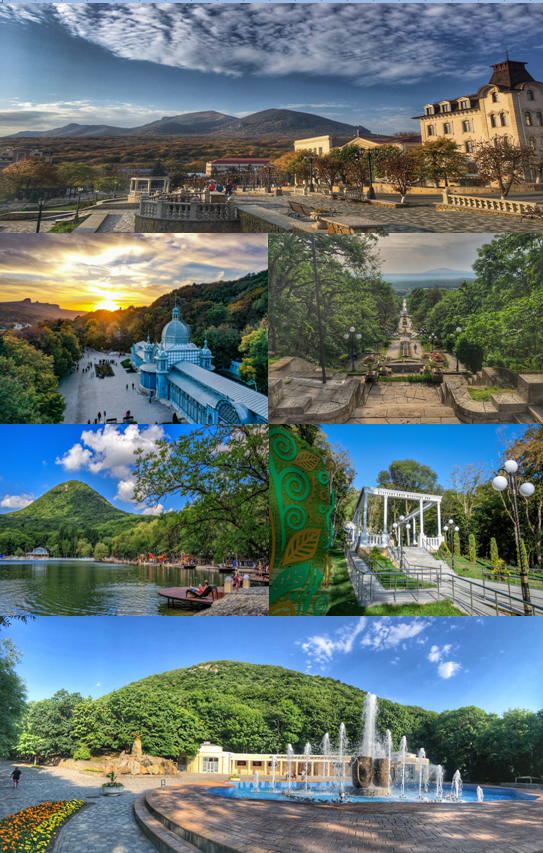

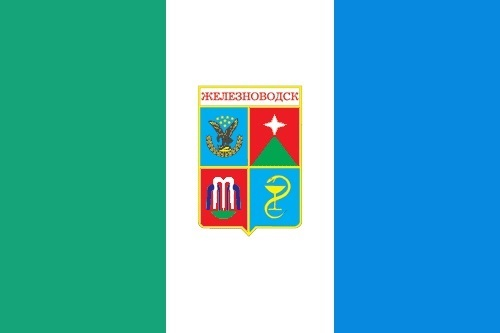
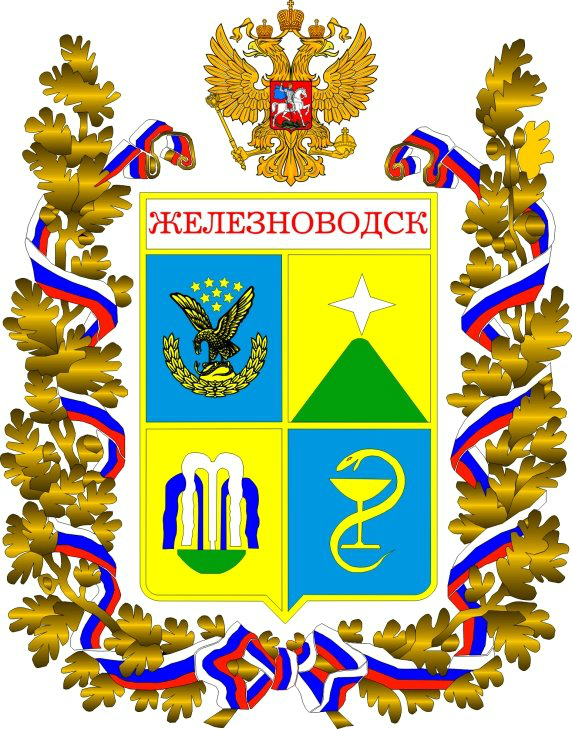
- Flag Coat of arms
- Interactive map of Zheleznovodsk
- Location of Zheleznovodsk Zheleznovodsk (Stavropol Krai)
- Coordinates: 44°08′22″N 43°01′01″E
- Country: Russia
- Federal subject: Stavropol Krai
- Founded: 1810
- Town status since: 1917

Area
  - Total: 93.13 km^{2} (35.96 sq mi)
- Elevation: 600 m (2,000 ft)

Population (2010 Census)
  - Total: 24,433
  - Estimate (2025): 21,727 (−11.1%)
  - Density: 262.4/km^{2} (679.5/sq mi)

Administrative status
  - Subordinated to: town of krai significance of Zheleznovodsk
  - Capital of: town of krai significance of Zheleznovodsk

Municipal status
  - Urban okrug: Zheleznovodsk Urban Okrug
  - Capital of: Zheleznovodsk Urban Okrug
- Time zone: UTC+3 (MSK)
- Postal codes: 357400, 357401, 357408, 357411, 357413, 357415, 357419
- Dialing code: +7 87932
- OKTMO ID: 07712000001
- Website: adm-zheleznovodsk.ru

Zheleznovodsk (Russian: Железново́дск) is a town in Stavropol Krai, Russia. Population: 24,433 (2010 census); 25,135 (2002 census); 28,460 (1989 Soviet census).

Historical population
Year	Pop.	±%
1959	11,927	—
1970	18,795	+57.6%
1979	23,537	+25.2%
1989	28,460	+20.9%
2002	25,135	−11.7%
2010	24,433	−2.8%
2021	22,863	−6.4%
Source: Censuses

== Etymology ==
The name of the town literally means iron-water-place, as the mineral waters springing from the earth in Zheleznovodsk were believed to have high content of iron.

== Geography ==
Zheleznovodsk is situated in the saddle between Mounts Beshtau and Zheleznaya, in what the locals refer to as aerodynamic tube, which attracts strong winds in the winter.

== History ==
During World War II, the town was occupied by the German Army from 10 August 1942 until 12 January 1943.

Zheleznovodsk was the place of signing the Zheleznovodsk Communiqué by Boris Yeltsin, Nursultan Nazarbayev, Ayaz Mutallibov, Levon Ter-Petrosyan on September 23, 1991.

On June 19, 2008, a 365-kilogram brass statue of an enema was unveiled in front of the "Mashuk" spa. It is the only known monument to the enema.

== Administrative and municipal status ==
Within the framework of administrative divisions, it is, together with the settlement of Inozemtsevo, incorporated as the town of krai significance of Zheleznovodsk—an administrative unit with the status equal to that of the districts. As a municipal division, the town of krai significance of Zheleznovodsk is incorporated as Zheleznovodsk Urban Okrug.

== Economy ==
Zheleznovodsk, along with Pyatigorsk, Yessentuki, Kislovodsk, and Mineralnye Vody, is a part of the Caucasian Mineral Waters, a renowned Russian spa resort. The town economy revolves around sanatoria, where dozens of thousands of people from all over Russia and former Soviet republics come year-around to vacation and rest, as well as prevent and treat stomach, kidney, and liver diseases. Dozens of spas operate in Russia's Caucasus Mountains region, exploiting the mineral springs in the area; colonic treatment is a specialty.

== Miscellaneous ==
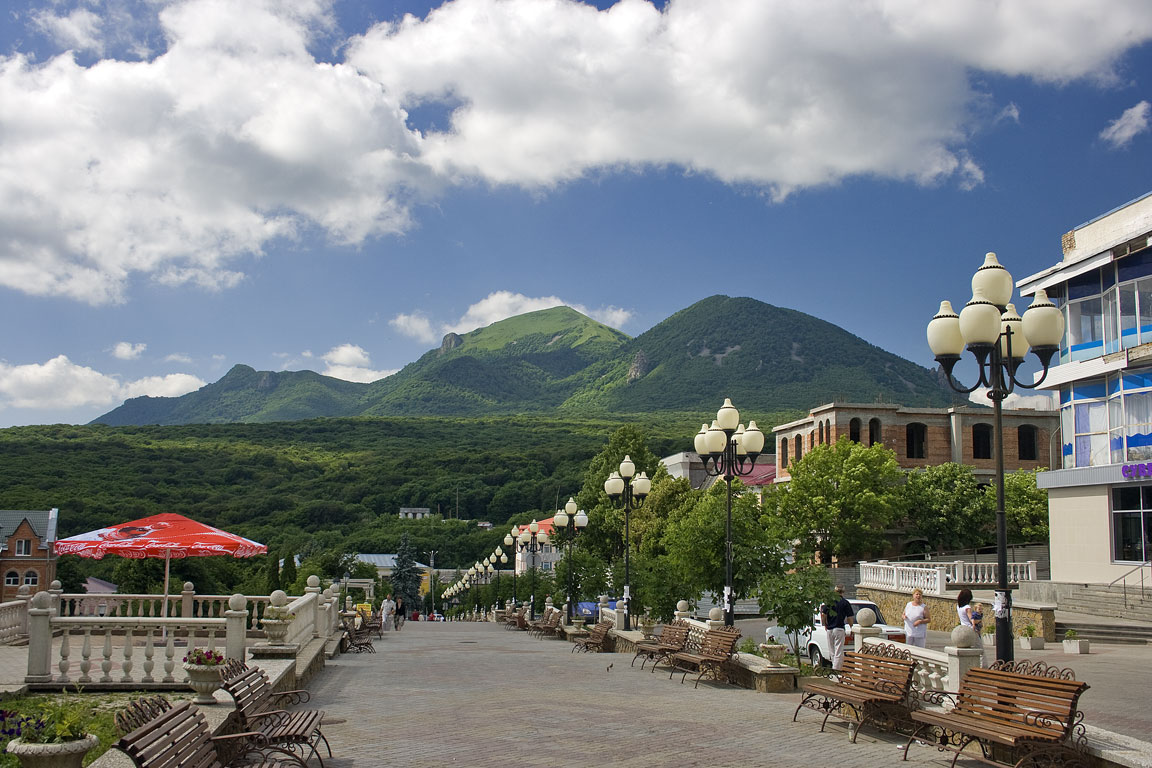
View of Mount Beshtau from Zheleznovodsk

Over the past several years, Zheleznovodsk was the site of the International Hot Air Balloon Festival.

== Notable people ==
- In 1841, Mikhail Lermontov, famous Russian poet, spent the last day of his life in Zheleznovodsk, from where he departed to his fatal duel on the slopes of Mount Mashuk in Pyatigorsk.
- Native Julia Sakharova won the top prize in the International Competition for Music of Eastern and Central Europe, at the age of fifteen.
