= Podkumok =

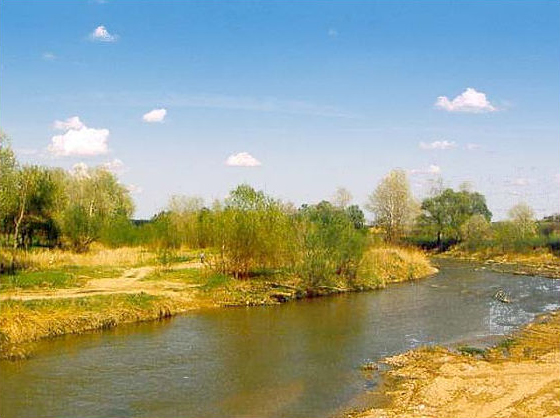
- The Podkumok near Georgiyevsk

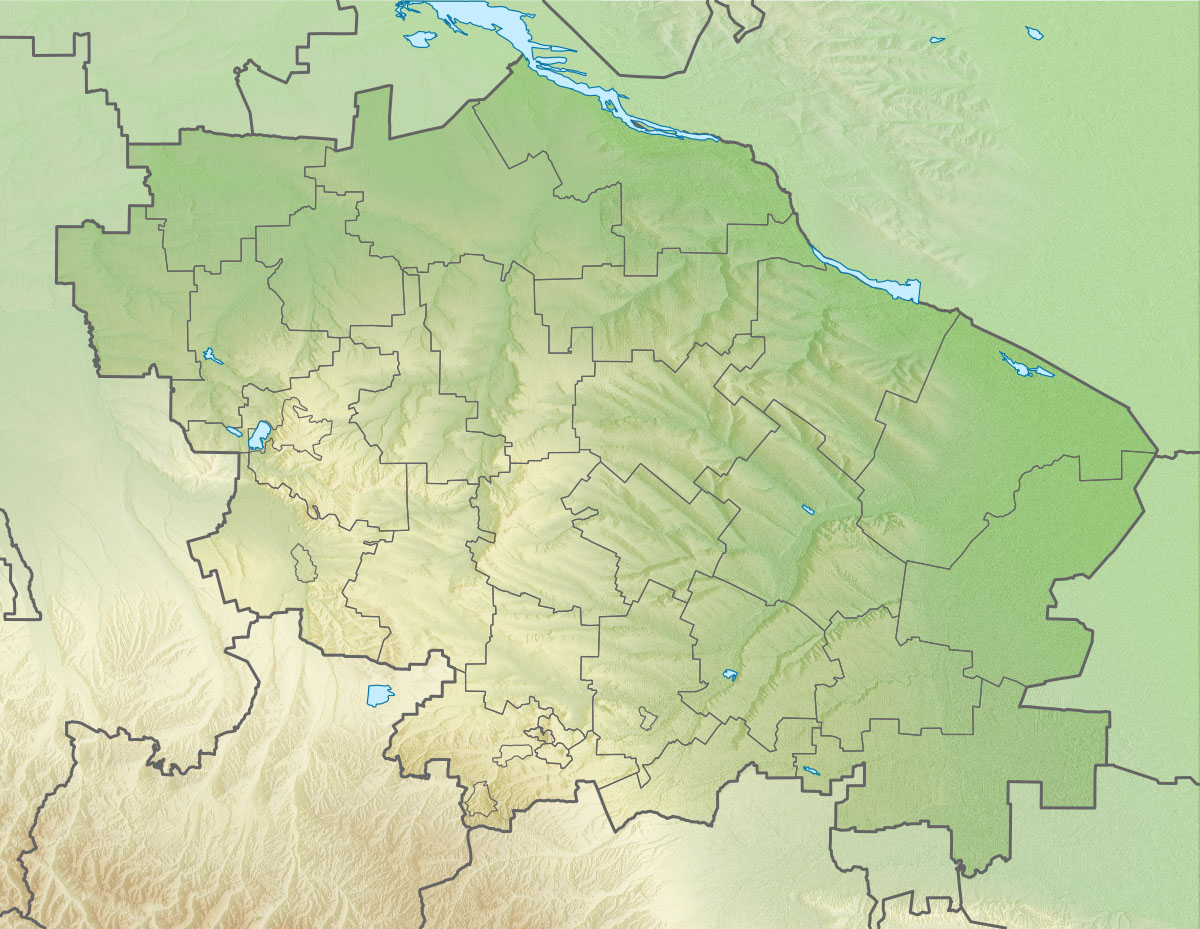
- Location within Stavropol Krai Location within European Russia

Location
- Country: Russia

Physical characteristics
- Mouth: Kuma
  - coordinates: 44.1954°N 43.4913°E
- Length: 160 km (99 mi)
- Basin size: 2,220 km^{2} (860 sq mi)

Basin features
- Progression: Kuma→ Caspian Sea
- Tributaries
  - right: Etoka

The Podkumok (Russian: Подку́мок) is a river in Stavropol Krai, Russia, right tributary of the Kuma. The length of the river is 160 km (99 mi). The area of its basin is 2,220 km^{2} (857 mi^{2}).

Originating in the Greater Caucasus, the Podkumok is widely used for irrigation. The biggest hydroelectric dam in Imperial Russia Water-powers Белые угли, built in 1903, was located on the Podkumok near Yessentuki.

The towns of Kislovodsk, Yessentuki, Pyatigorsk, Georgiyevsk and urban-type settlements Goryachevodsky, Svobody are located on the Podkumok.
