= History of the Jews in Pyatigorsk =

Pyatigorsk Jews
יהודי פיאטגורסק Пятигорские евреи
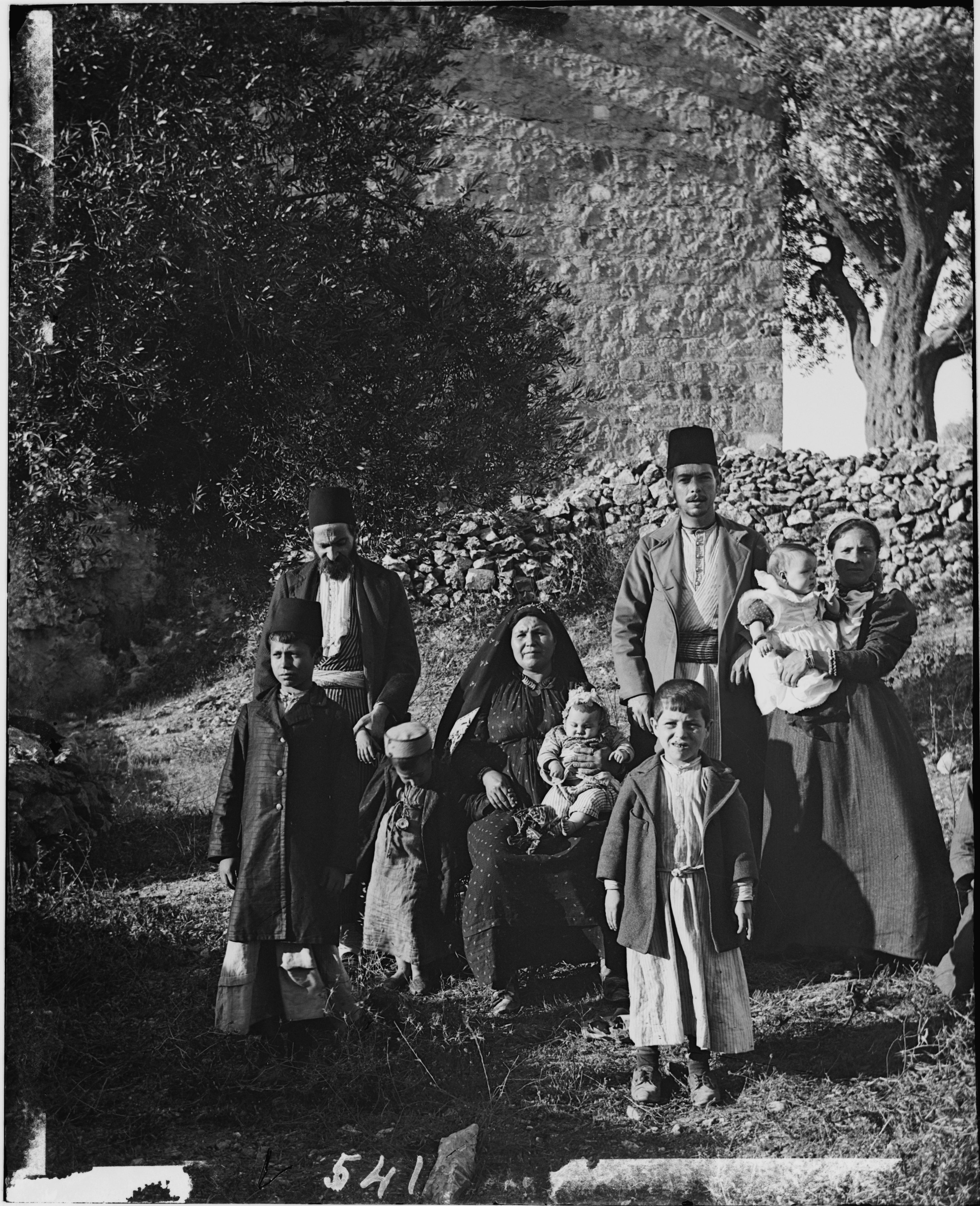

Total population
- 300–350

Languages
- Hebrew (in Israel), Judeo-Tat, Russian

Religion
- Judaism

Related ethnic groups
- Ashkenazi Jews, Mountain Jews

The Jewish community in Pyatigorsk consists of Jews who have lived in the territory of modern-day Pyatigorsk, a city in Stavropol Krai, in the North Caucasus region of Russia. Jews began settling in Pyatigorsk at the beginning of the 19th century. At that time, they settled in the area of the Market Square, which is now known as the Lower Market.

== History ==
In the 1840s, the house of the merchant Pomiluikin was used as a synagogue where Jews came to pray. In 1882, the first synagogue was built on Market Square. On the city plan of Pyatigorsk, drawn up in 1887, it was designated as a Jewish prayer house. The project and construction of the synagogue were overseen by a local rabbi, a retired soldier. Its construction cost 7,000 rubles. The synagogue building was made of local stone and consisted of a vestibule and a two-color hall, one-third of which was occupied by a balcony for praying women. During the Soviet era, the synagogue building housed a sports school, but unfortunately, it was later demolished.

In 1869, a synagogue operated in Pyatigorsk.

In 1873, 64 Jews lived in Pyatigorsk.

In 1893, 193 Jews lived in Pyatigorsk, a significant portion of whom were Mountain Jews. Keeping the registers of births and deaths was the responsibility of the Pyatigorsk rabbi. He had to keep records of births and deaths, marriages, and divorces. All records were kept in Russian and submitted to the city government. In 1895, by decree of the Minister of War, General Pyotr Vannovsky, Jews were prohibited from receiving treatment and using mineral waters in Pyatigorsk. Only in 1906 were Jews allowed to receive treatment at the Caucasian Mineral Waters, but for no more than two months.

In 1897, Joseph Trumpeldor founded and headed the Zionist organization in Pyatigorsk. In 1900, in the house of one of the members of the organization, the Zionists staged a play based on Theodor Herzl's "The New Ghetto" (1898).

Since 1905, Miller was the rabbi in Pyatigorsk.

In 1903, Jews were the fifth largest population in Pyatigorsk. In 1907, the city was allowed to open its first Jewish school, and by 1910, there were already two synagogues and a Jewish cemetery. In 1911, the Jewish population rapidly grew to 318 people, including 120 men and 98 women. After the October Revolution in 1917, the Jewish population grew to 1,113 people.

In 1910, 167 Jews lived in Pyatigorsk.

In 1920, the Jews of Pyatigorsk participated in creating a special Caucasian unit of Mountain Jews to be sent to the Polish front. In 1926, representatives from Pyatigorsk participated in the First Congress of Mountain Jews of the North Caucasus in Nalchik. The activities of the Jewish community members were diverse; they were engaged in trade, jewelry, and ran doctors’ offices. There were also engineers and technologists among them. The first movie theater in the city, "Lira," was opened by a Jew. On September 1, 1903, the first tram started running in Pyatigorsk. Two brothers from a Jewish family leased the tram and assumed all the costs of its operation.

In 1926, about 1,500 or 800 Jews (including 52 Mountain Jews) and 2 Karaites lived in Pyatigorsk. In 1939, 1,139 Jews lived in the city, and in 2002, 880 Jews lived there.

In the early 1930s, Wilk was the rabbi in Pyatigorsk.

On August 10, 1942, Pyatigorsk was occupied by units of the German army. A Judenrat was created, consisting of three people (a pharmacist, a doctor, and an artist). In early September 1942, about 2,800 Jews were taken from Pyatigorsk to an anti-tank ditch near the city of Mineralnye Vody and exterminated there.

After 1945, some Jews returned to Pyatigorsk. In 1946, a synagogue operated in Pyatigorsk at 4 Kvartalnaya Street, but it was closed in 1963. The rabbi was Yakov Yevseevich Godovich (1865–?). On ordinary days, 15–20 people gathered in the synagogue, and on holidays, 100–150 people.

Jewish life in Pyatigorsk began to revive in the late 1980s. In 1989, the Jewish community "Geula" was organized. On April 9, 1990, Rabbi Shertil Shalumov opened a synagogue at 27 Shosseynaya Street. "Geula" is the largest Jewish community in the region.

In 2011, a plot of land at 85 Palmiro Togliatti Street was purchased with donations from members of the Pyatigorsk Jewish community for the construction of a new community center.

On July 6, 2014, a ceremonial laying of a capsule with prayer scrolls and a message to future descendants in the foundation of the construction of a new synagogue and Jewish community center took place in Pyatigorsk.

The second synagogue was opened at 85 Palmiro Togliatti Street, where the Pyatigorsk Jewish Religious Community "Geula" is located.

A Hebrew school and a youth club operate in Pyatigorsk.

== Notable Jews of Pyatigorsk ==
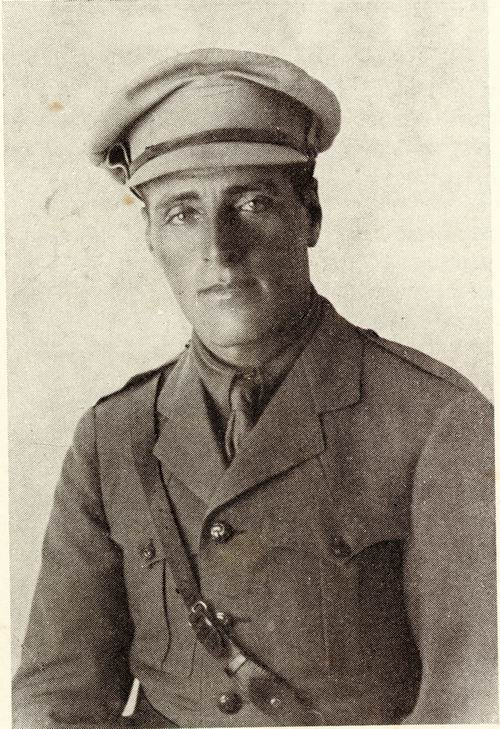
Joseph Trumpeldor

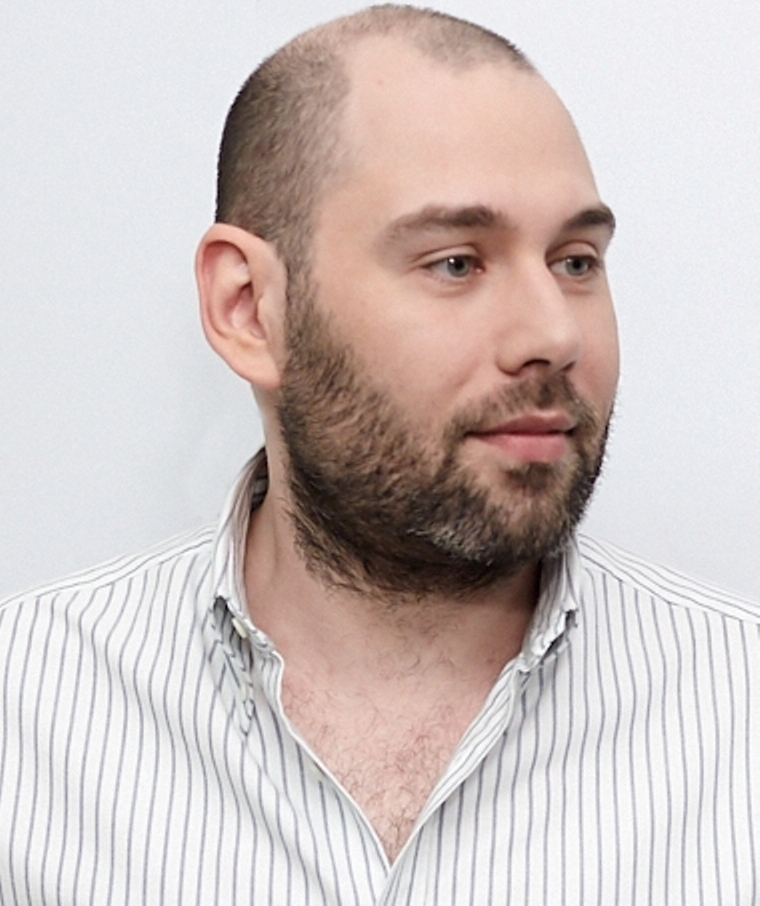
Semyon Slepakov

- Joseph Trumpeldor (1880-1920), was an early Zionist activist who helped organize the Zion Mule Corps and bring Jewish immigrants to Palestine.
- Semyon Slepakov (born 1979), Russian producer, screenwriter and show-runner

== See also ==
- History of the Jews in Russia
- Ashkenazi Jews
- Mountain Jews
