= Brothers Bernardacci =

The Brothers Bernardacci, Johann Karlovich (1782–1842) and Joseph Karlovich (1788–1840), natives of Lugano (in the Italian speaking canton of Ticino), were architects who arrived in Russia in 1822. They created that "сlean new town" (Princess Mary), which Lermontov found in 1837 at Gorjachevodsk (now Pyatigorsk).

Having devoted all of their life to construction on the Caucasus (Pyatigorsk, Kislovodsk, Stavropol, Tbilisi, Georgievsk), the Bernardacci created some landmarks connected with the name of Lermontov. In Pyatigorsk they designed Restoratsija, Nikolay's (nowadays Lermontov's) baths, Diana's grotto, the Aeolian harp pavilion, a gallery above Elisabeth's (nowadays Academic) spring, the house for retired officers (in 1837 - a city commandant's office, nowadays a resort clinic), house of E.A.Hastatova (it has not survived), Areshev's houses (in one of them Lermontov became acquainted with Belinsky; the houses have not survived), a garden opposite the Nikolay baths (nowadays the Tsvetnik), the State garden (now the Gorky Park of Culture) and others, and also a direct road from Pyatigorsk to Zheleznovodsk on which Lermontov travelled before his duel. In Kislovodsk the Bernardacci constructed Restoratsija (has not survived) and A.F. Rebrov's house.
