= Yessentuki =

City in Stavropol Krai, Russia

Yessentuki Ессентуки
- City
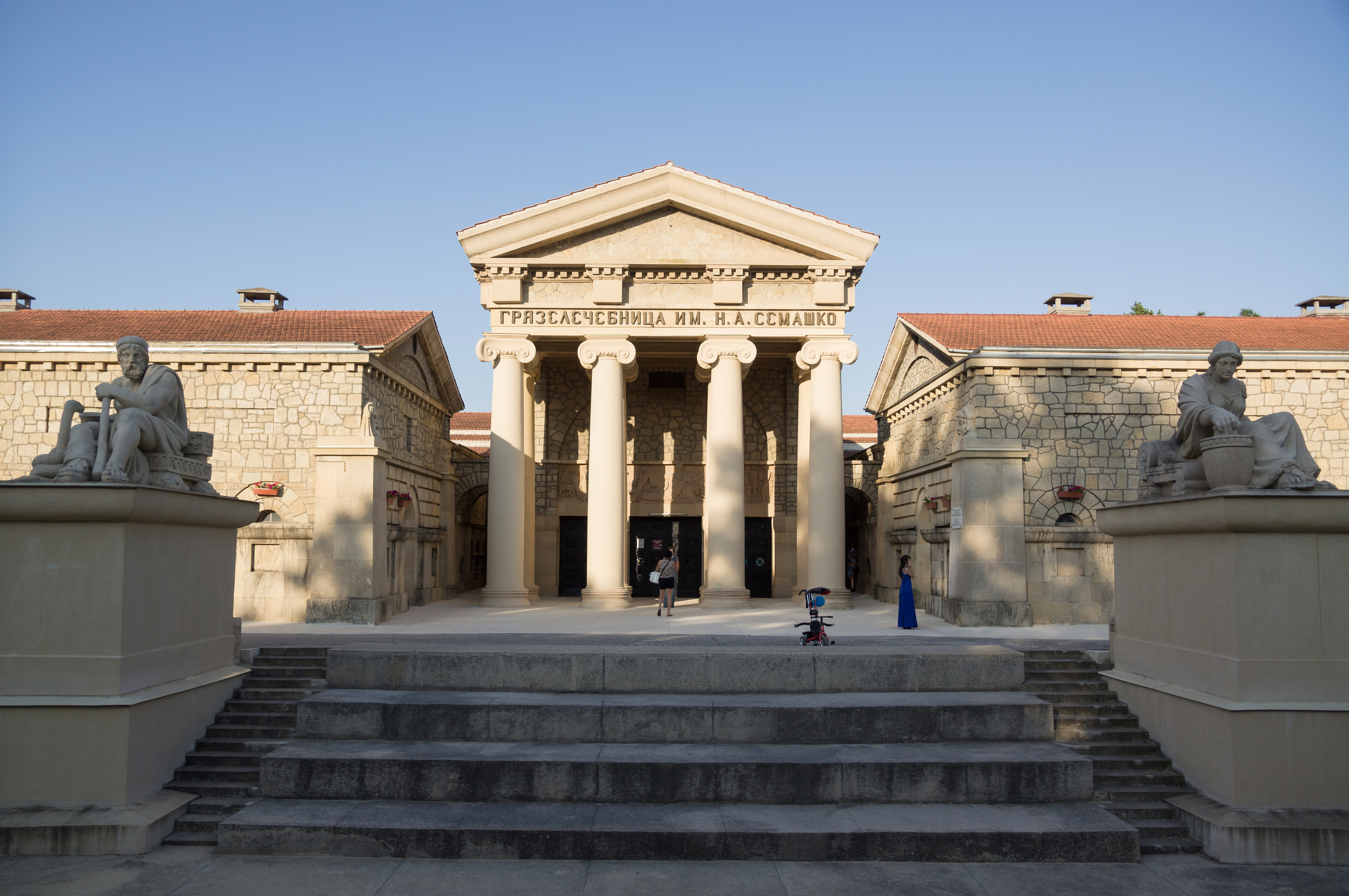
- Yessentuki mud baths building

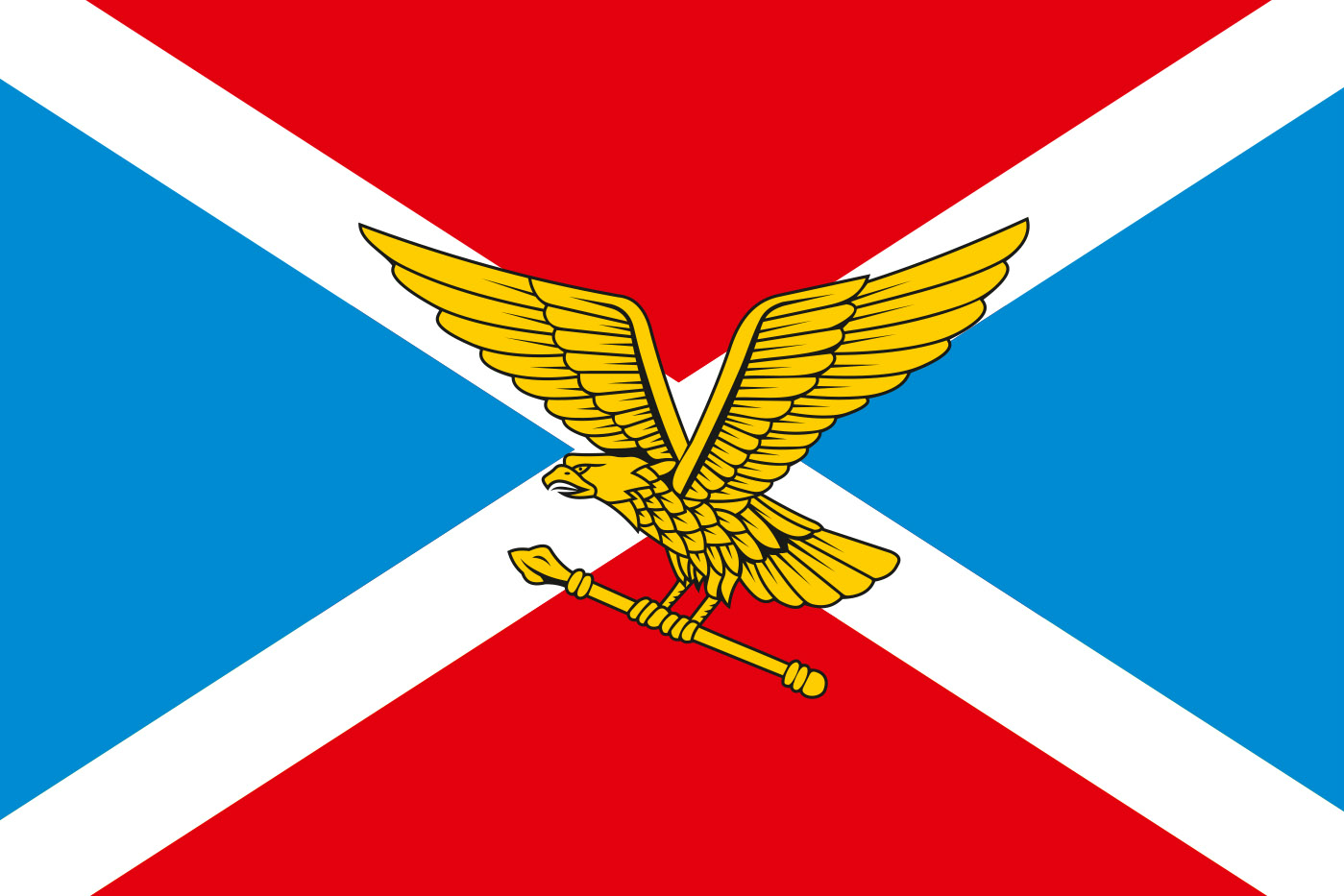
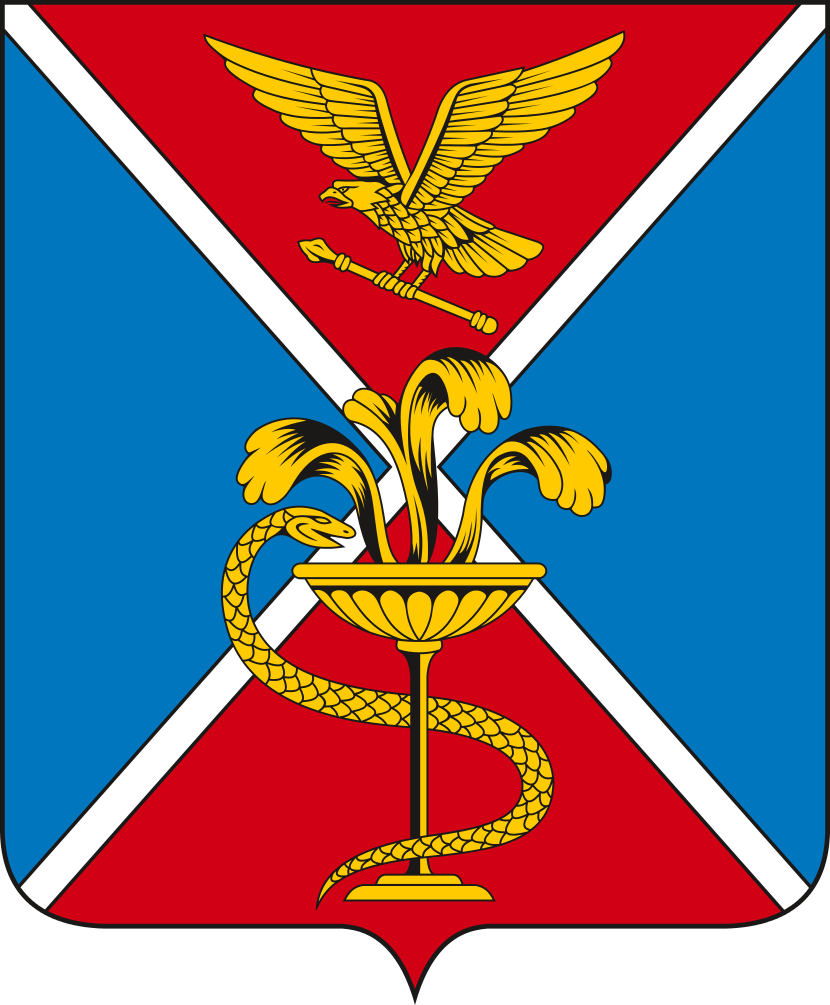
- Flag Coat of arms
- Interactive map of Yessentuki
- Location of Yessentuki Yessentuki (Stavropol Krai)
- Coordinates: 44°02′N 42°51′E
- Country: Russia
- Federal subject: Stavropol Krai
- Founded: 1825
- City status since: 1917

Government
  - Body: City Council
  - Head: Vladimir Krutnikov
- Elevation: 640 m (2,100 ft)

Population (2010 Census)
  - Total: 108,000
  - Estimate (2024): 123,138 (+14%)
  - Rank: 162nd in 2010

Administrative status
  - Subordinated to: city of krai significance of Yessentuki
  - Capital of: city of krai significance of Yessentuki

Municipal status
  - Urban okrug: Yessentuki Urban Okrug
  - Capital of: Yessentuki Urban Okrug
- Time zone: UTC+3 (MSK)
- Postal code: 357600
- Dialing code: +7 87934
- OKTMO ID: 07710000001
- City Day: Last Saturday of August
- Website: adm-essentuki.ru

Yessentuki (Russian: Ессентуки́, IPA: [jɪsɪntʊˈkʲiˑ]) is a city in Stavropol Krai, Russia, located in the shadow of Mount Elbrus at the base of the Caucasus Mountains. The city serves as a railway station in the Mineralnye Vody—Kislovodsk branch, and is located 43 kilometers (27 mi) southwest of Mineralnye Vody and 17 kilometers (11 mi) west of Pyatigorsk. The city is renowned for its mineral springs and therapeutic spas, and is part of the Caucasian Mineral Waters region.

It is considered the cultural capital of Russia's Greek population and close to ten percent of its population is of Greek descent. Population: 119,658 (2021 census); 100,996 (2010 census); 81,758 (2002 census); 85,082 (1989 Soviet census).

== History ==
Research by the Soviet archaeologist M.E. Masson and excavations of eight mausoleums showed that there was a large Golden Horde settlement near the present-day Essentuki in the 13th-15th centuries. Masson believed that the name Essentuki came from the name of a certain Khan Essentug from the names "Yesan Forest" and "Yesan Field" that have survived to this day.

In 1798, the Russian military and border redoubt of Yessentuksky was laid on the right bank of the Bolshoy Yessentuchok River, near its confluence with the Podkumok River. After the construction of the Kislovodsk fortress in 1803, the redoubt was abolished, and only the Cossack post was kept on its site.

The mineral waters of Yessentuki were first probed in 1810 by the Moscow doctor Fyodor Gaaz. Gaaz found two small wells with salty water (the present Gaazo-Ponomaryovsky spring) in the valley of the stream of Kislusha, about 4 kilometers (2.5 mi) northeast of the Yessentuksky post. A detailed study of Bugunta mineral waters (the original name of the waters, after the Bugunta River flowing nearby) was made in 1823 by the Russian doctor and pharmacologist A. P. Nelyubin, who found twenty more mineral springs on the slopes of the mountain he referred to as Shchelochnaya (Nelyubin's numbering of the Yessentuki mineral waters is still maintained). In 1825, General Yermolov founded the stanitsa of Yessentukskaya on the Bugunta River 3.5 kilometers (2.2 mi) northeast of the former Yessentuksky post; its inhabitants were engaged in trade, trucking, and serving arriving patients. In 1839, water from springs ##23-26 was led to the common pool, where the first two baths of the wooden bathhouse were built at the expense of the Cossack Regiment Management.

Since 1840, springs ##4 and 17 have come into use and become especially popular. Yessentuki was recognized as one of the best health resorts for treatment of the digestive organs. In 1846, Prince Mikhail Vorontsov, the namestnik (vicegerent) of Caucasus, ordered to extend the territory of the stanitsa of Yessentukskaya to the northeast to approach the springs. Since then, Buguntinskiye mineral waters were referred to as Yessentukskiye. In 1847, some grounds closely adjacent to the springs were transferred to the newly established state Management of Waters in Pyatigorsk. In the late 1840s, bottling of Yessentuki waters and their dispatch to other cities of the country began. By the early 1870s, regular sale of the water was carried out in most of the large Russian cities. Construction of the Rostov-on-Don–Mineralnye Vody railway in 1875 and the Mineralnye Vody–Kislovodsk highway (via Pyatigorsk and Yessentuki) contributed to increase in the number of guests coming to Yessentuki for treatment. In 1883, the resort was visited by about 5,000 people; in 1900, by more than 13,000; in 1913, by 38,000. In the late 19th and early 20th centuries, medical establishments, hotels, and summer residences were intensively built. In 1902, a seventy-bed sanatorium for the poor, the first one within the Caucasian Mineral Water system, was opened; in a year, the first departmental twenty-bed sanatorium for postal workers was built. In 1905, drilling of holes resulted in discovery of new springs (main spout of spring #17, new discharges of the water similar to the one of spring #4).

In 1917, the resort area was separated from the stanitsa of Yessentukskaya and was granted town status. During the Russian Civil War, resort facilities of Yessentuki fell into decay. Restoration work began only in 1920. In 1922, the clinical branch of Pyatigorsk Balneal Institute (the present Pyatigorsk Research Institute of Balneology and Physiotherapy) was opened. In 1925, the health resort operated six sanatoria and treated the total of about 13,000 patients. During the Great Patriotic War of 1941–1945, the health resort was heavily damaged by Nazi occupation from August 10, 1942 to January 11, 1943 and was restored at the end of the 1940s.

In 1991, Yessentuki provided rest and treatment for more than 217,000 patients. In 1991, the health resort operated twenty-five sanatoria, including ten belonging to the trade unions; the number of beds totaled over 10,000. It also provided outpatient treatment and board and treatment authorization. Service of guests involved such facilities as a resort polyclinic with aerosun rooms and climatic pavilions; a therapeutic mud bath; three bathhouses: Nizhniye (lower) baths (50 baths), Verkhniye (upper) baths (90 baths), and a new bathhouse (110 baths); 4 drinking galleries and well-rooms of springs ##4 and 17; an inhalatorium shared by all the resorts; a department of mechanotherapy, applying special techniques of therapeutic physical training.

== Administrative and municipal status ==
Within the framework of administrative divisions, it is incorporated as the city of krai significance of Yessentuki—an administrative unit with the status equal to that of the districts. As a municipal division, the city of krai significance of Yessentuki is incorporated as Yessentuki Urban Okrug.

== Mineral springs ==
Of all mineral springs of Yessentuki, about twenty are of medical value. Sodium carbonic hydrocarbonate-chloride (i.e. salt-alkaline) water of springs #4 and #17, which have made the health resort popular, are the most famous and therapeutically valuable. The hot springs (35.5°–46 °C) similar to the waters of springs #4 and #17 in their structure have been led to the surface in the vicinities of the village of Novoblagodarnoye (8 kilometers (5.0 mi) north of Yessentuki). The water of springs #4 and #17 and their analogues are used for peroral treatment. Carbonic hydrogen-sulphide water of holes #1 and #2, as well as calcium-sodium hydrosulphuric sulphate-hydrocarbonate (the so-called sulphur-alkaline) water of the Gaazo-Ponomarevsky spring are used for baths, lavages, inhalations and other balneotherapeutic procedures. Calcium-magnesium sulphate-hydrocarbonate water of spring #20 is used for baths. The water of springs #4 and #17 is bottled by a local bottler as a healing water (#17) and as a healing table water (#4) under the name of Yessentuki.

Alongside mineral waters, the medical establishments of Yessentuki use sulphide silt muds of Tambukan Lake (8 kilometers (5.0 mi) southeast of Pyatigorsk). Besides, climatotherapy, electrochromophototherapy, etc. are widely used. The health resort specialises in treatment of patients with diseases of digestion organs as well as those with metabolic disorder.

== Economy ==
The town has food-processing enterprises (a cannery, a dairy factory, a brewery, a meat-processing plant, etc.), a knitting mill, a clothes and a shoe factory.

== Points of interest ==
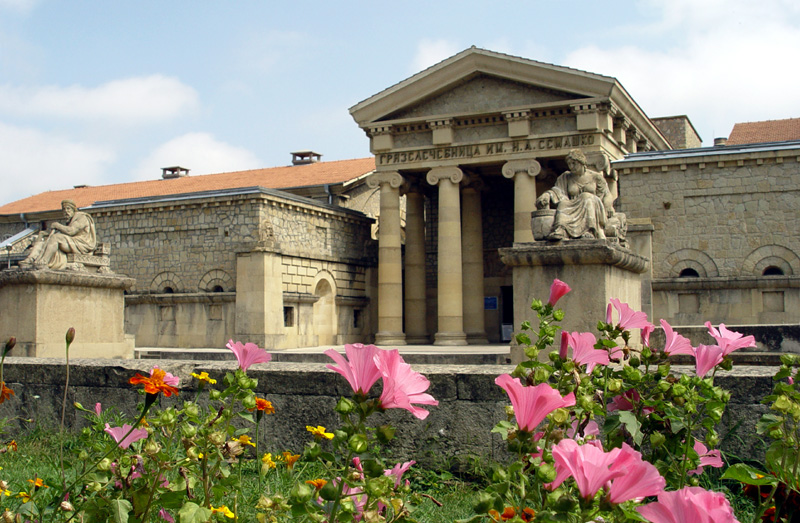
Balneotherapy facilities in Yessentuki (1915), fronted by statues of Asclepius and Hygieia

The oldest architectural monument of Yessentuki is the wooden St. Nicholas' Church (built in the mid-1820s, presumably by the architects Giovanni and Giuseppe Bernardacci) in the centre of the former stanitsa. The orthogonal lay-out of the town, dating back to the middle of the 19th century, and a regular residential building-up of the second half of the 19th and the early 20th centuries, have been preserved here, in the southern end of Yessentuki. The resort area is to the north-east of the stanitsa part of Yessentuki. Its core is the extensive Kurortny (Glavny) Park (planted mostly with ash, oak, hornbeam, chestnut, maple, poplar, linden, etc., decorative bushes, flowers), laid in 1849, with springs of mineral water and numerous constructions: the building of the drinking gallery (1847–1856, architect S. Upton, Moresque style), the Nikolayevskiye (the present Verkhniye) baths (1899, architects N. V. Dmitriyev and B. V. Pravzdik), the Commercial gallery (1912, architect Y. F. Shreter, neo-classicism; the present Electroheliotherapy Institute), the wooden observation pavilion with colonnade referred to as Oreanda (1912), four pavilions above drinking well-rooms (1912–1913, architect N. N. Semyonov, neo-classicism), etc. The majority of sanatoriums and boarding houses are concentrated around Glavny Park. The area to the north of the Park (between the latter and the railway line) was developed since the end of the 19th century as a zone for private sanatoriums, villas (Orlinoye gnezdo, 1912–14, Art Nouveau), and resort constructions; the monumental building of the therapeutic mud bath in the spirit of ancient Roman thermae decorated with a mighty Ionic portico and numerous sculptures (1913–1915, architect Shreter, sculptors L. A. Ditrikh and Vasily Kozlov). In 1903, the Angliysky Park was laid out behind the railway line.

The main area of modern industrial and residential building is the so-called Novye Yessentuki. Among the significant structures of the middle of the 20th century are four solemn entrances to the Kurortny Park (mid-1950s, architect P. P. Yeskov), the drinking gallery of spring No. 4 (1967, architect V. N. Fuklev), the Ukraina sanatorium (1972), etc.

== Climate ==
The climate is moderately continental. Winter is mild, with thaws; the temperature in January averages to −4 °C (25 °F); severe frosts sometimes take place; mists are frequent. Spring is short, sometimes the weather is cool, rainy (mostly in April). Summer is warm, with a large number of hot and dry days; the temperature in July averages to +25 °C (77 °F). Fall is warm and lasting; the temperature in September averages to about 15-20 °C. Precipitations of about 500 millimeters (20 in) a year. A large number of clear, sunny days (280 a year on average) is typical. The open position in the east and in the west makes Yessentuki accessible for winds prevailing here: dry eastern ones, which are hot in summer and cold in winter; and wet south-west ones, cool in summer and warm in winter.

== Notable people ==
Fast growth of the Yessentuki health resort in the last third of the 19th and the early 20th centuries attracted famous representatives of Russian culture, including the writers Vladimir Korolenko, Aleksandr Kuprin, Maxim Gorky and Konstantin Balmont; the composers Sergei Taneyev, Sergei Rachmaninoff and Sergei Prokofiev; the singer Feodor Chaliapin; and the theatrical figures Maria Savina, Vera Komissarzhevskaya and Konstantin Stanislavsky.

Boris Petrovsky, a well-known surgeon and long-term Soviet health minister, was a native of Yessentuki.

== Twin cities ==
Yessentuki is twinned with:

- Thrissur, India
