= Etoko =

Etoko may refer to:

- Etoko, Cameroon, a village in Cameroon
- Etoko, Russia, a village (selo) in the Kabardino-Balkar Republic, Russia
- Etoko River, a river in the Kabardino-Balkar Republic, Russia
- Etoko, Uganda, a village in Uganda and parts entering Democratic Republic of Congo

== See also ==
- Etoka (disambiguation)
