= Etoka (river) =

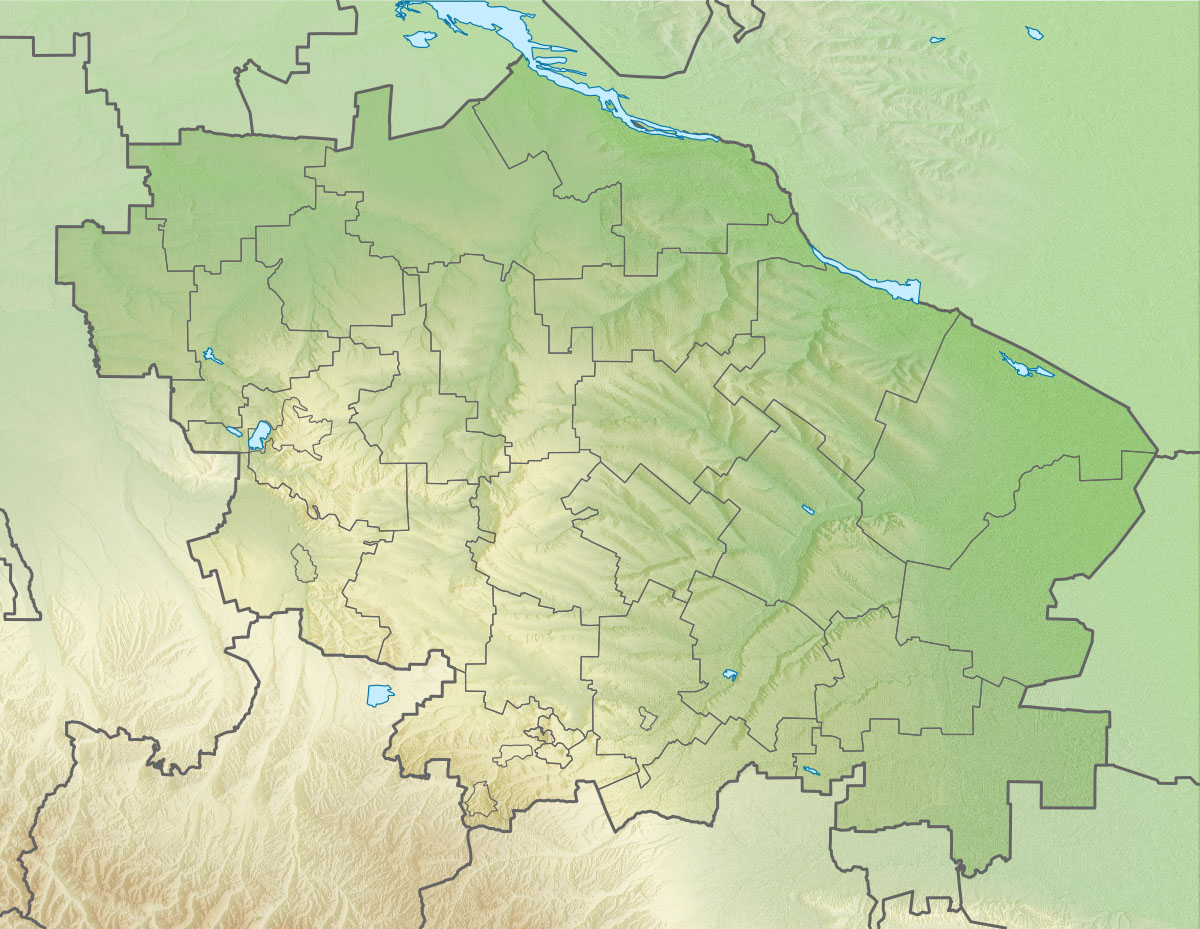
- Location within Stavropol Krai Location within European Russia

Location
- Country: Russia

Physical characteristics
- Mouth: Podkumok
  - coordinates: 44.1662°N 43.4018°E

Basin features
- Progression: Podkumok→ Kuma→ Caspian Sea

The Etoka (Russian: Этока; Adyghe: Ят1экъуэ, Yatheque) is a mountain creek, a tributary of the river Podkumok (near Pyatigorsk), in Predgorny District, Stavropol Krai and north of Zolsky District, Kabardino-Balkaria Russia. A village with the same name is located by Etoka.

Water from the river is channeled to feed Lake Tambukan. However this water have led to desalinization of the lake, threatening its balneological properties and disrupting the overall ecology of the area.

The etymology of the name is from the Adyghe language: "Ят1э, clay/mud" + "къуэ, valley"
