= Caucasian Mineral Waters =

Hot spring of Russia

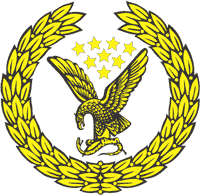
Emblem of the region

The Caucasian Mineral Waters is a group of spa resorts, located in the Northern Caucasus region of Russia. It includes the towns of Pyatigorsk, Zheleznovodsk, Yessentuki, and Kislovodsk. The region features over 130 sanatoriums and hotels, many equipped with the latest medical equipment, which can accommodate up to 30,000 people simultaneously. As of 2022, the spas receive over 730,000 visitors annually. In addition to approximately 300 mineral springs with diverse properties, the region is famous for its landscape, mild climate, and the medicinal mud of Lake Tambukan.

== History ==
The Pyatigorsk springs were first described in the 14th century, by the Arab traveler Ibn Battuta. Since at least the 17th century, Northern Caucasian folklore has attributed healing properties to the local water. One legend tells of a hunter who, in pursuit of a wolf, fell into a spring and was miraculously cured of rheumatism.

In the early 18th century, Peter the Great, having enjoyed spa resorts in Spa and Karlsbad, was determined to develop local analogues. In 1717, he published the decree "On the Search for Mineral Waters in Russia," launching the search for medicinal mineral springs within the country. The resulting expedition identified several sources of "sour water" in modern-day Chechnya.

On April 24, 1803, Alexander I signed a rescript "On the Recognition of the National Significance of the Caucasian Mineral Waters and the Necessity of Their Development." This date marks the beginning of the region as a recognized Russian resort. Following this, the resort was visited by famous Russian writers, artists and statesmen, including Mikhail Lermontov, Alexander Pushkin, and Nikolay Raevsky.

The region’s resort potential began to be properly developed in 1863 with the establishment of the Russian Balneological Society in Pyatigorsk. That same year, the society set up a chemical laboratory to analyze the mineral waters. Over the course of the century, doctors and researchers progressively identified medicinal properties of the waters and established treatment protocols.

A new era for the resorts began with the issuance of Lenin’s Decree No.231, “On Health Resorts of National Significance,” in 1919. Despite the chaos of the Russian Civil War, the resort quickly recovered and welcomed up to 50,000 visitors in 1928. Except for a brief period of occupation during the Second World War, the Caucasian Mineral Waters served as the largest hospital hub for recovering veterans both during and after the war.

Following the Second World War, the resort quickly expanded, and many new sanatoriums were built.
