= Beshtau =

Mountain in Stavropol Krai, Russia

Mount Beshtau
- Бештау
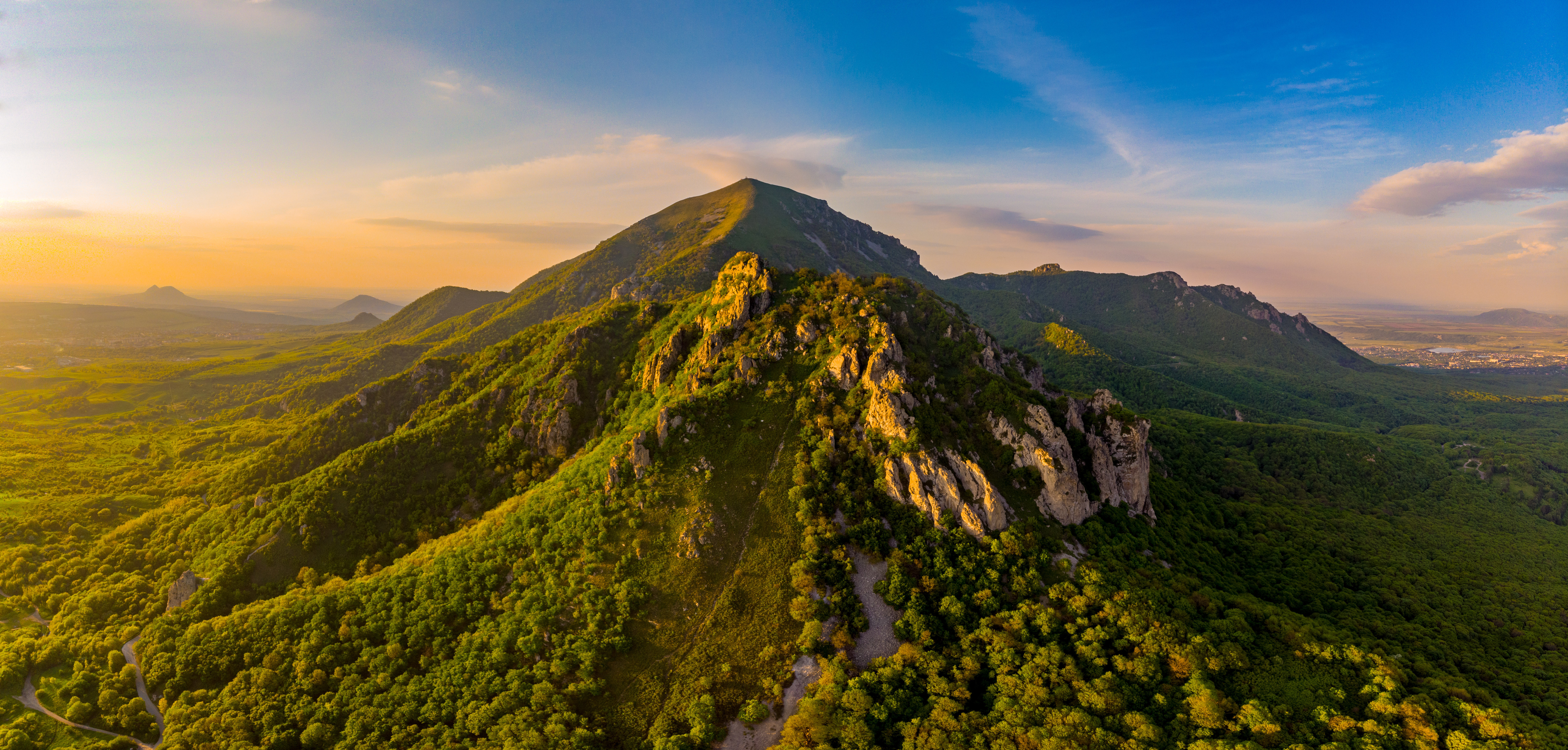

Highest point
- Elevation: 1,401 m (4,596 ft)
- Coordinates: 44°4′36.62″N 43°0′53.64″E

Naming
- Etymology: from Turkic beş 'five' and tau 'mountain'
- Native name: Бештау (Russian)

Geography
- Location within Caucasus Mountains
- Country: Russia
- Federal subject: Stavropol Krai
- City: near Pyatigorsk
- Parent range: Greater Caucasus

Geology
- Mountain type: Volcano

Beshtau (Russian: Бештау, from Turkic beş 'five' and tau 'mountain') is an isolated five-domed igneous mountain (volcano) in the northern vicinity of Pyatigorsk in the Northern Caucasus, Russia. It gave name to the historical region of Pyatigorye (literally "area of five mountains"), the town of Pyatigorsk, and the ethnonym Pyatigoryan Circassians or Pyatigortsy (Circassi Quinquemontani on old Western European maps).

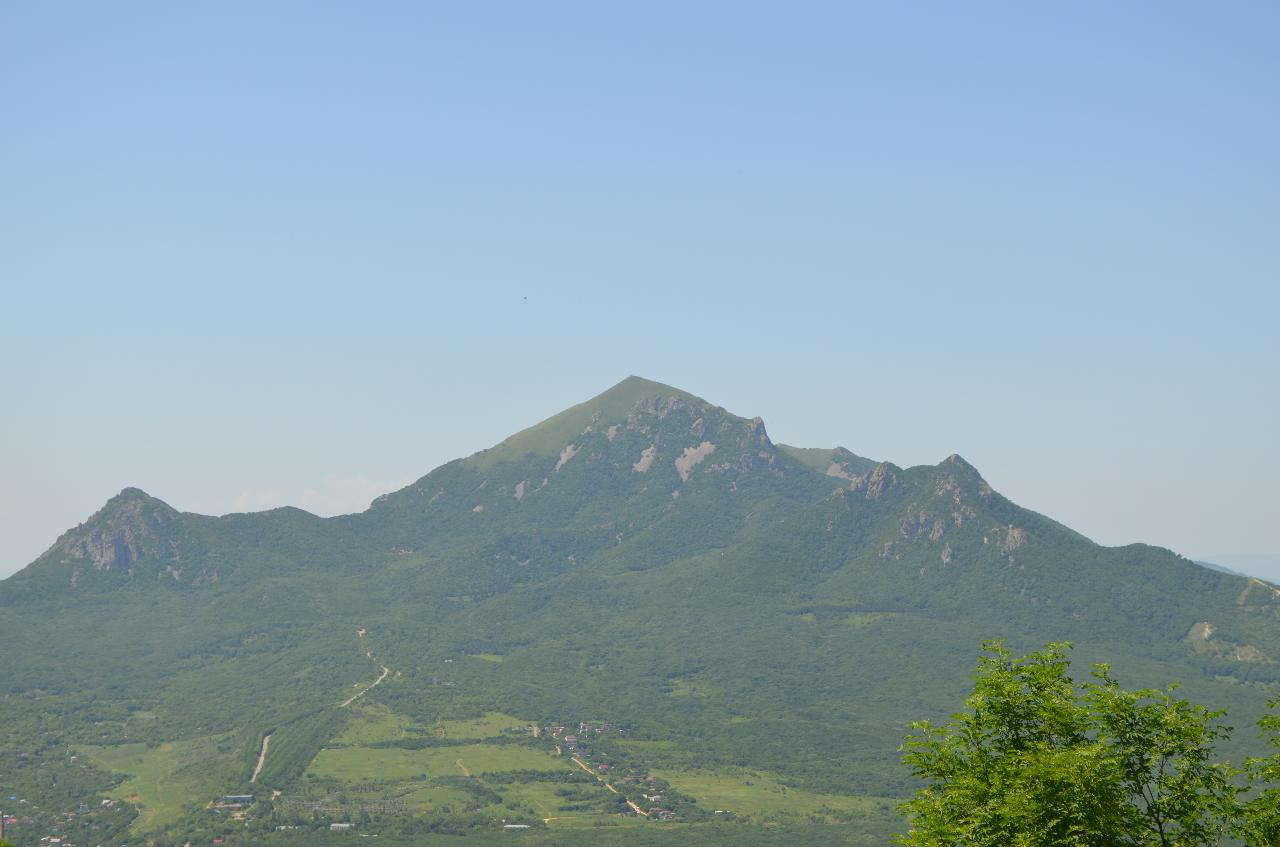
View of Mount Beshtau from the top of Mount Mashuk (Машук)

Its height is 1,401 m (4,596 ft). The slopes are forested with ash, oak, hornbeam, and beech deciduous forests, and the summit is treeless. Beshtau used to have uranium mines managed by the Mine Administration No. 10 of the Ministry of Medium Machine-Building (a euphemism for the Soviet nuclear industry), which were operating during 1950 – 1988.

By the foothill of the mountain there is the Second Athos Monastery of the Dormition.

== See also ==
- Mashuk
