= Inozemtsevo =

Inozemtsevo Иноземцево
- Settlement
- Interactive map of Inozemtsevo
- Location of Inozemtsevo Inozemtsevo (Stavropol Krai)
- Coordinates: 44°06′N 43°06′E
- Country: Russia
- Federal subject: Stavropol Krai
- Founded: 1801

Population (2010 Census)
  - Total: 28,398
  - Estimate (2025): 28,091 (−1.1%)

Administrative status
  - Subordinated to: town of krai significance of Zheleznovodsk

Municipal status
  - Urban okrug: Zheleznovodsk Urban Okrug
- Time zone: UTC+3 (MSK)
- Postal code: 357432
- OKTMO ID: 07712000056

Inozemtsevo (Russian: Иноземцево) is an urban locality (a settlement) under the administrative jurisdiction of the town of oblast significance of Zheleznovodsk in Stavropol Krai, Russia. Population: 28,398 (2010 census); 27,110 (2002 census); 21,358 (1989 Soviet census).
