= Goryachevodsky =

Goryachevodsky Горячеводский
- Urban-type settlement
- Interactive map of Goryachevodsky
- Location of Goryachevodsky Goryachevodsky (Stavropol Krai)
- Coordinates: 44°02′N 43°07′E
- Country: Russia
- Federal subject: Stavropol Krai
- Founded: 1825
- Elevation: 505 m (1,657 ft)

Population (2010 Census)
  - Total: 36,967
  - Estimate (2025): 35,706 (−3.4%)
- Time zone: UTC+3 (MSK)
- Postal code: 357560
- OKTMO ID: 07727000056

Goryachevodsky (Russian: Горячево́дский) is an urban locality (a settlement) under the administrative jurisdiction of the city of krai significance of Pyatigorsk in Stavropol Krai, Russia, located at the confluence of the Podkumok and Yutsa Rivers. Population: 36,967 (2010 census); 34,456 (2002 census); 29,706 (1989 Soviet census). As of the 2010 Census, it was Russia's most populous urban locality that did not have a town status.
