= Lake Tambukan =

Lake in Russia

Tambukan Lake
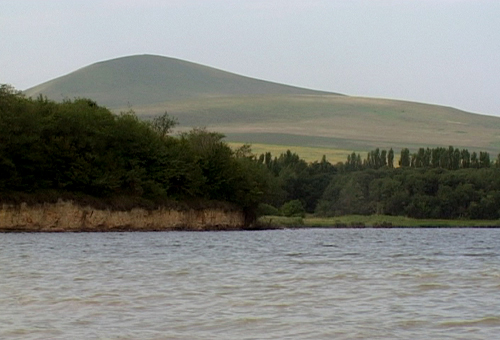

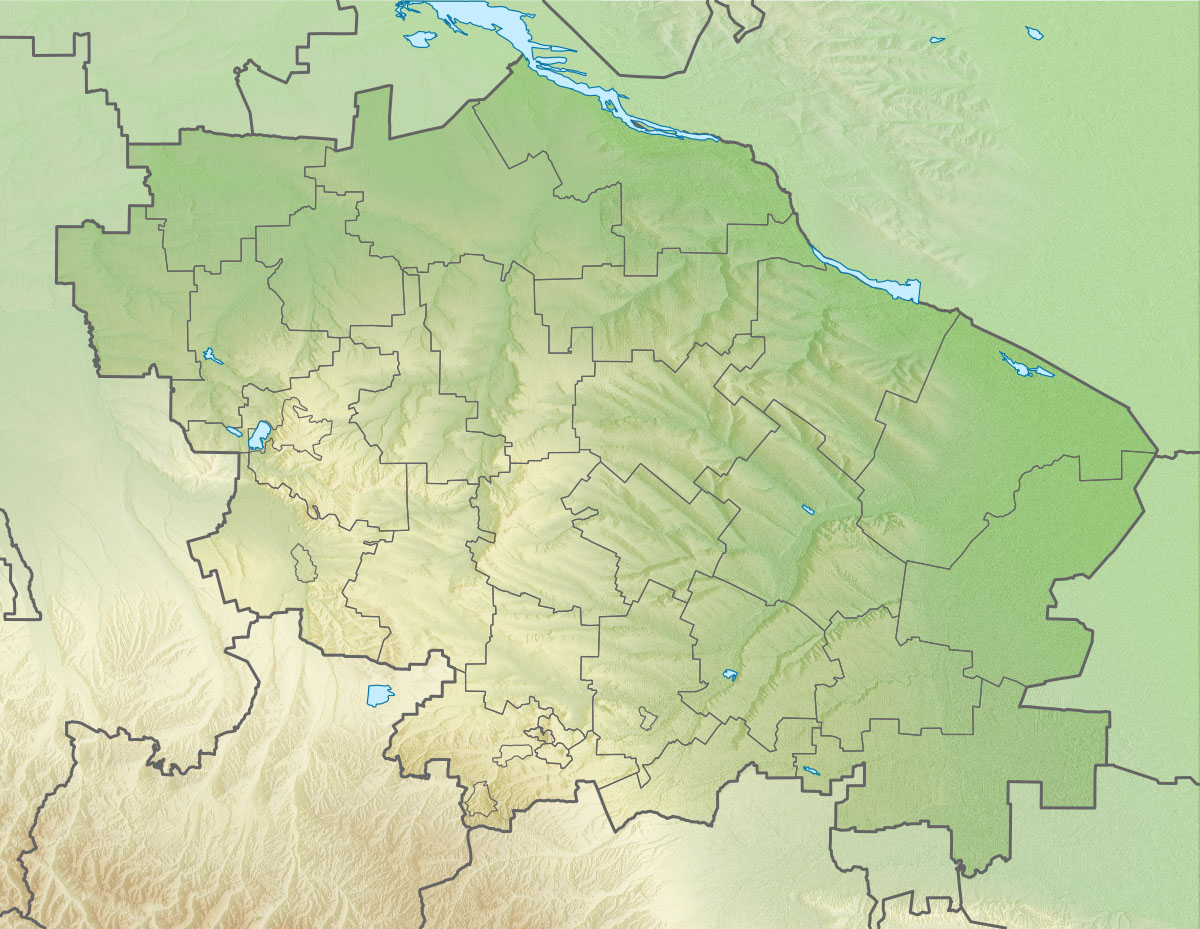
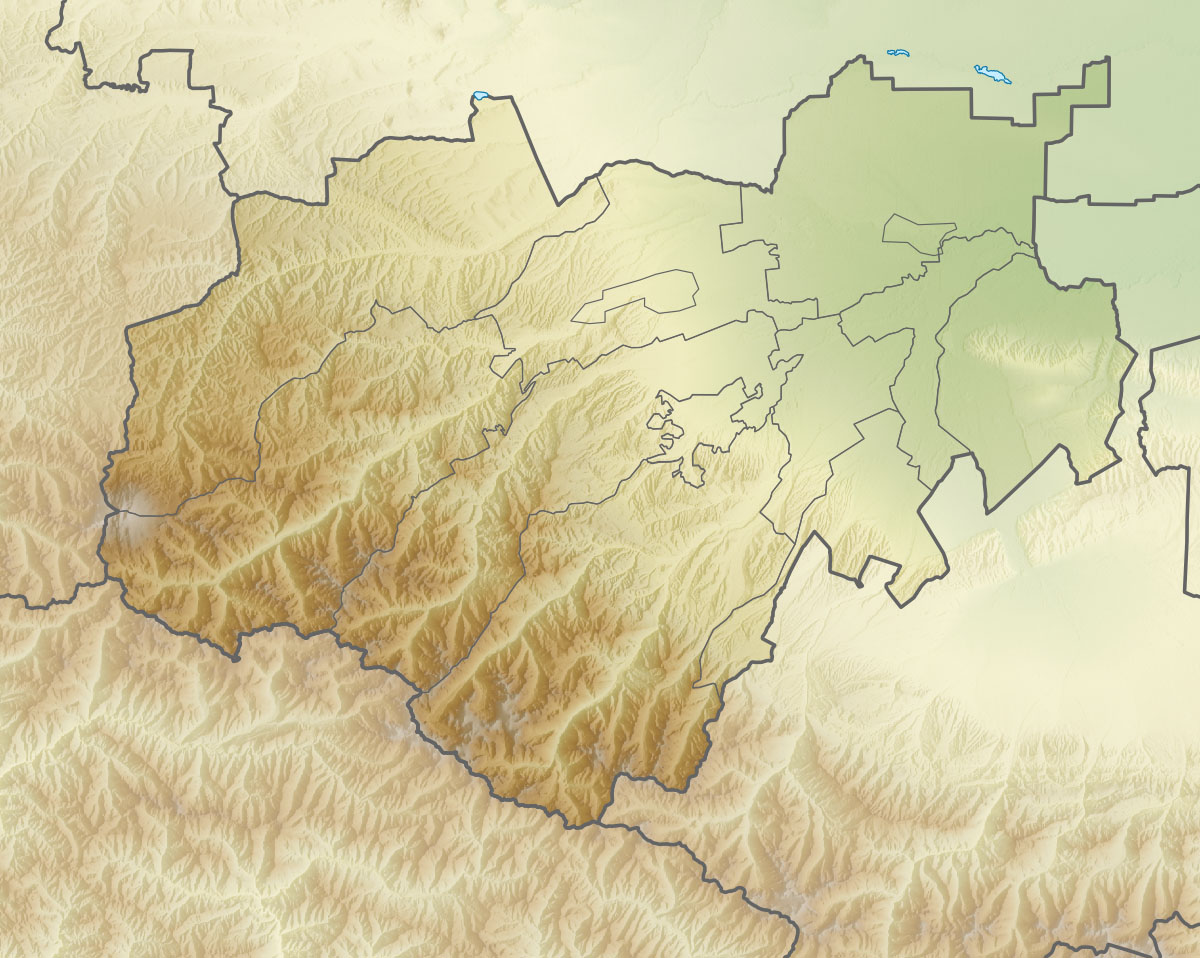
- Location within Stavropol Krai Location within Kabardino-Balkaria Location within Caucasus Mountains
- Location: Northern Caucasus
- Coordinates: 43.9586°N 43.1616°E
- Basin countries: Russia
- Surface area: 1.87 km^{2} (0.72 sq mi)
- Max. depth: 3.1 m (10 ft)

Tambukan Lake (Russian: Тамбукан) is a lake with bitter-salt water on Northern Caucasus in Stavropol Krai (about 33% surface) and the Kabardino-Balkar Republic (about 66% surface) of Russia, located eight kilometers from Pyatigorsk. The lake's surface area is 1.87 square kilometers, and its depth ranges between 1.5 and 3.1 meters.

The lake bed is a thick layer of silt, which has been used since 1886 in institutions for mud cures in Yessentuki and other therapeutic mud baths in the region of Caucasian Mineral Waters. These mud baths have been used by famous individuals such as Feodor Chaliapin, Anton Chekhov, and Leo Tolstoy.

== Notable events ==
In 1395, the warlord Timur took a bath in Tambukan Lake.

In 1709, Kabardian prince Murzarbek Tambiev defeated the Crimean-Turkish army near this lake . The word Tambukan comes from Turkic words Tambu qanı and means Tambiev’s blood or Tambiev’s asylum.

In 1717, Peter The Great sent his physician Shober on an expedition to Tambukan Lake to obtain medicinal water and mud.

The first scientific description of Tambukan Lake was by Guldenschtedt in 1773.
