= Zaterechny (urban-type settlement) =

Zaterechny Затеречный
- Urban-type settlement
- Interactive map of Zaterechny
- Location of Zaterechny Zaterechny (Stavropol Krai)
- Coordinates: 44.7965°N 45.2085°E
- Country: Russia
- Federal subject: Stavropol Krai
- Administrative district: Neftekumsky District
- Founded: 1953

Population (2010 Census)
  - Total: 7,696
  - Estimate (2025): 6,403 (−16.8%)
- Time zone: UTC+3 (MSK)
- Postal code: 356871
- OKTMO ID: 07641153051

Zaterechny (Russian: Затеречный) is an urban locality (an urban-type settlement) in Neftekumsky District of Stavropol Krai, Russia. Population: 7,696 (2010 census); 7,697 (2002 census); 6,272 (1989 Soviet census).
