= Pyatigorsk =

City in Stavropol Krai, Russia

Pyatigorsk Пятигорск
- City
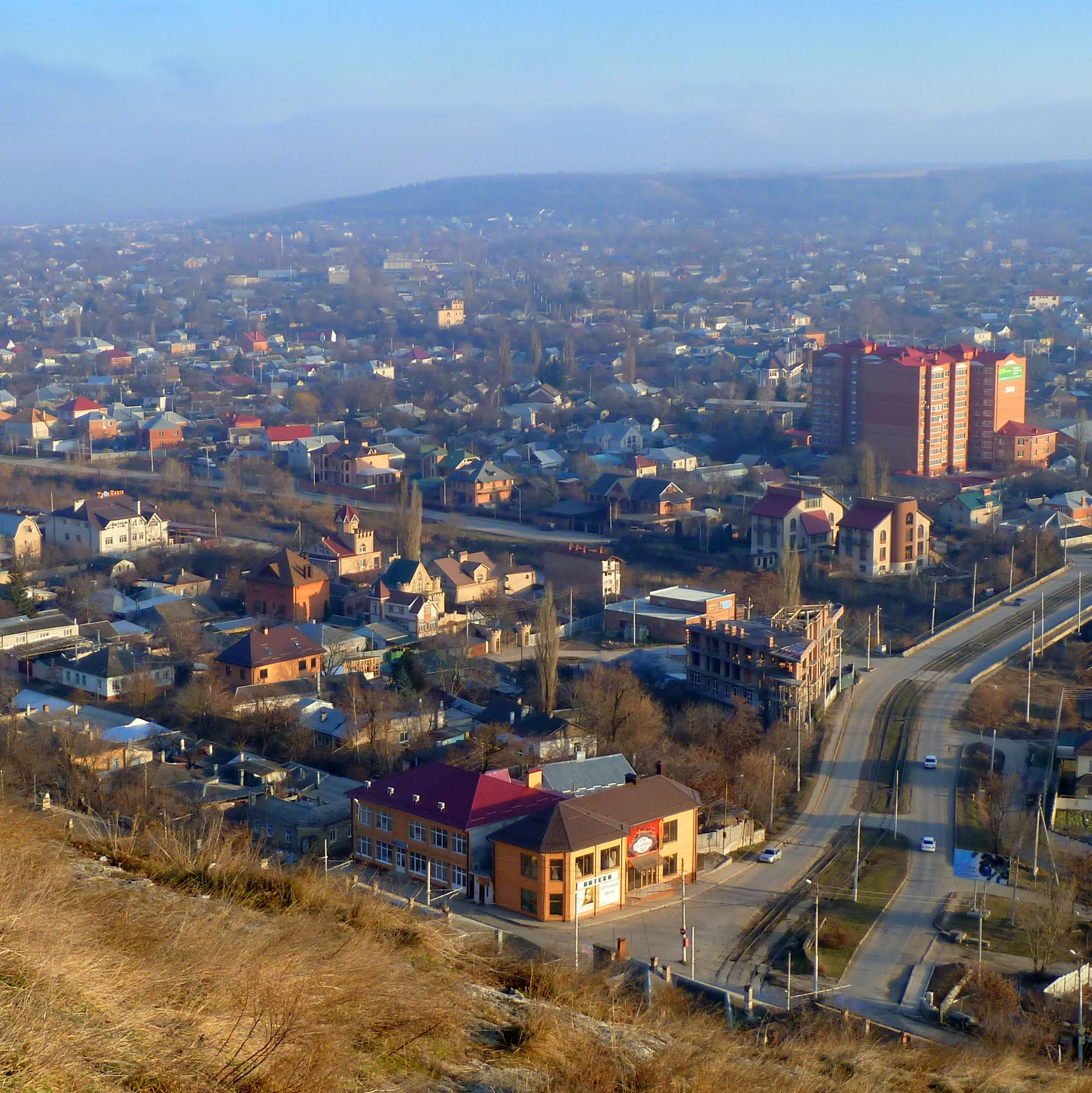
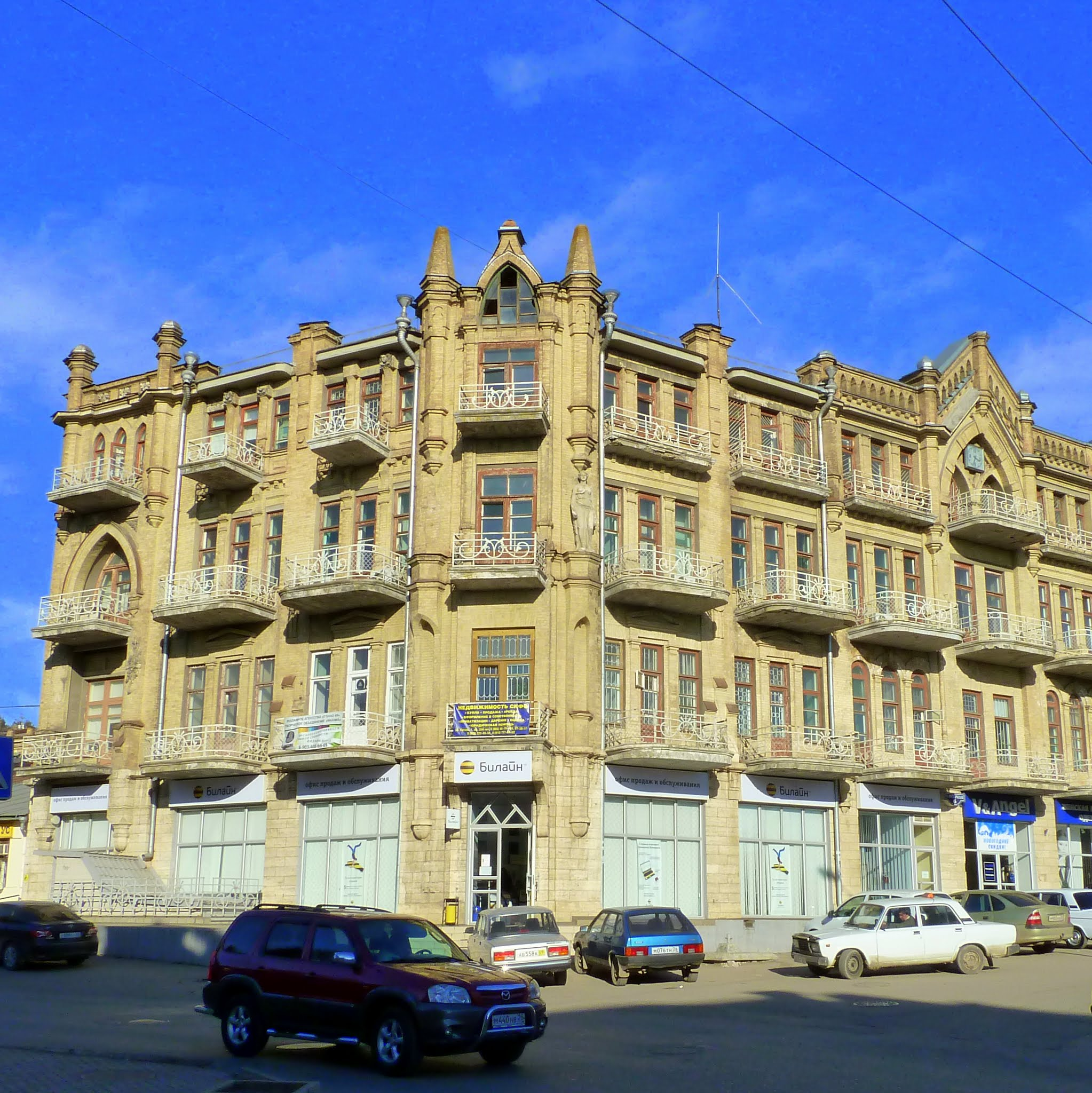
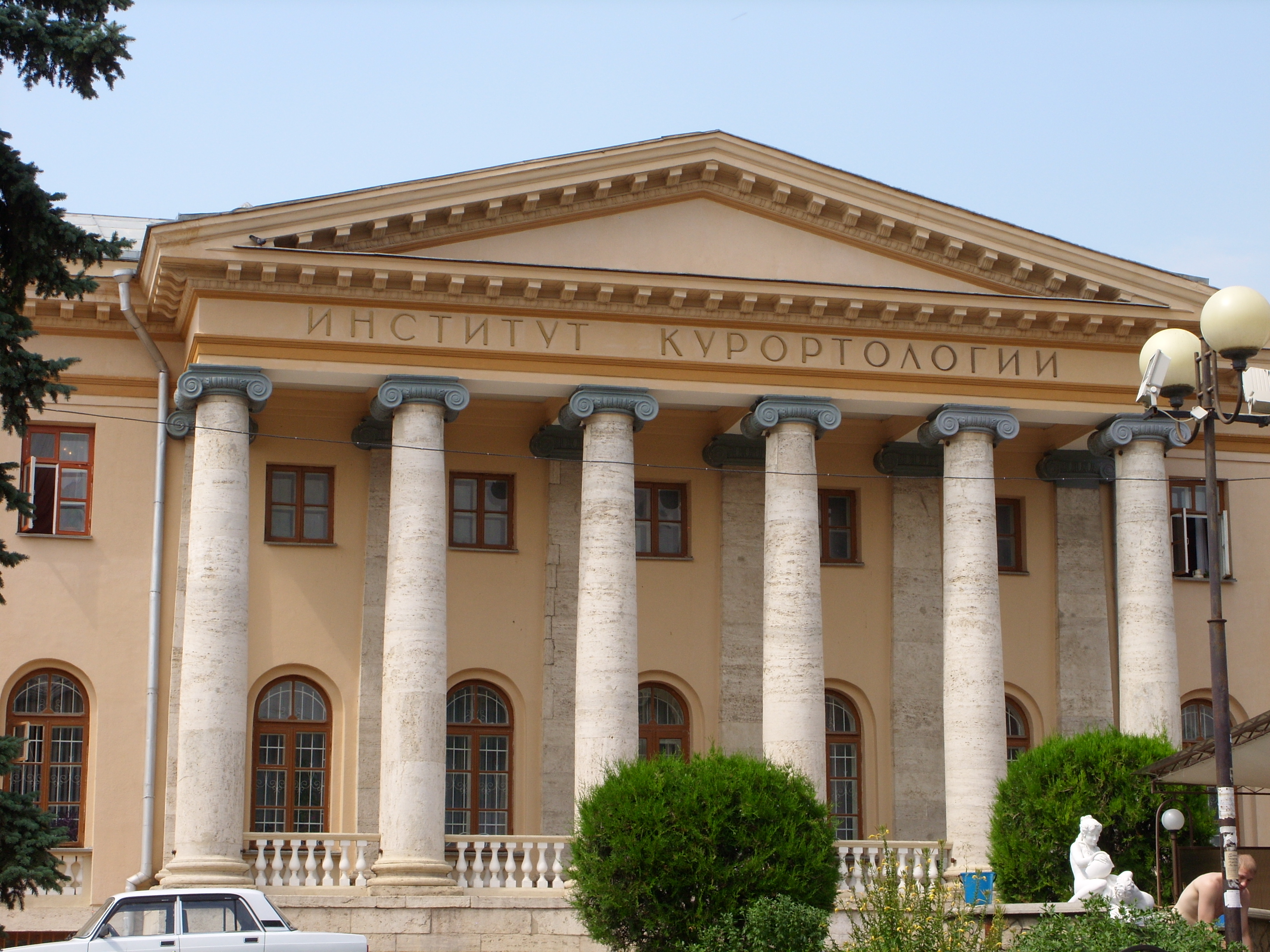
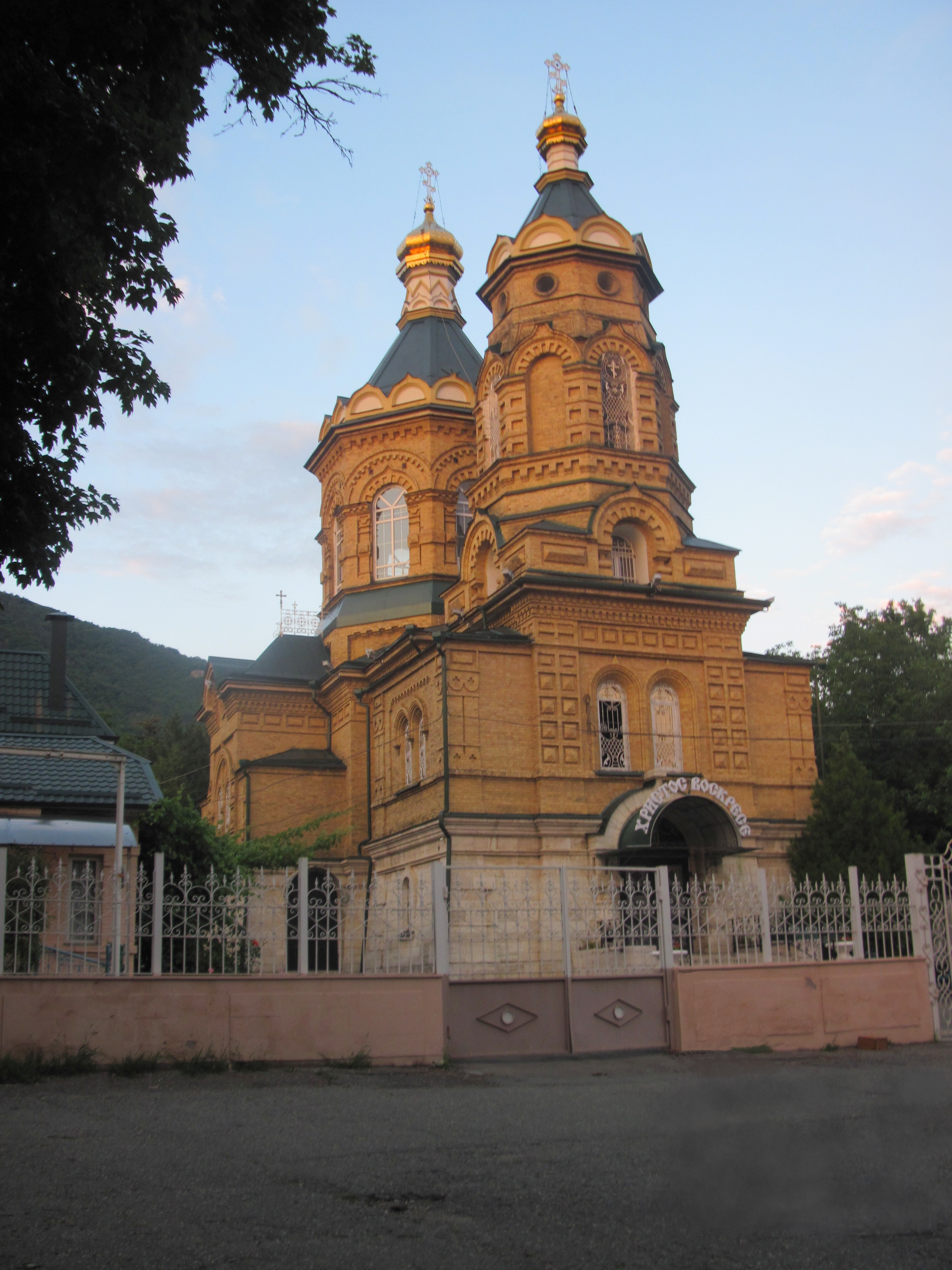
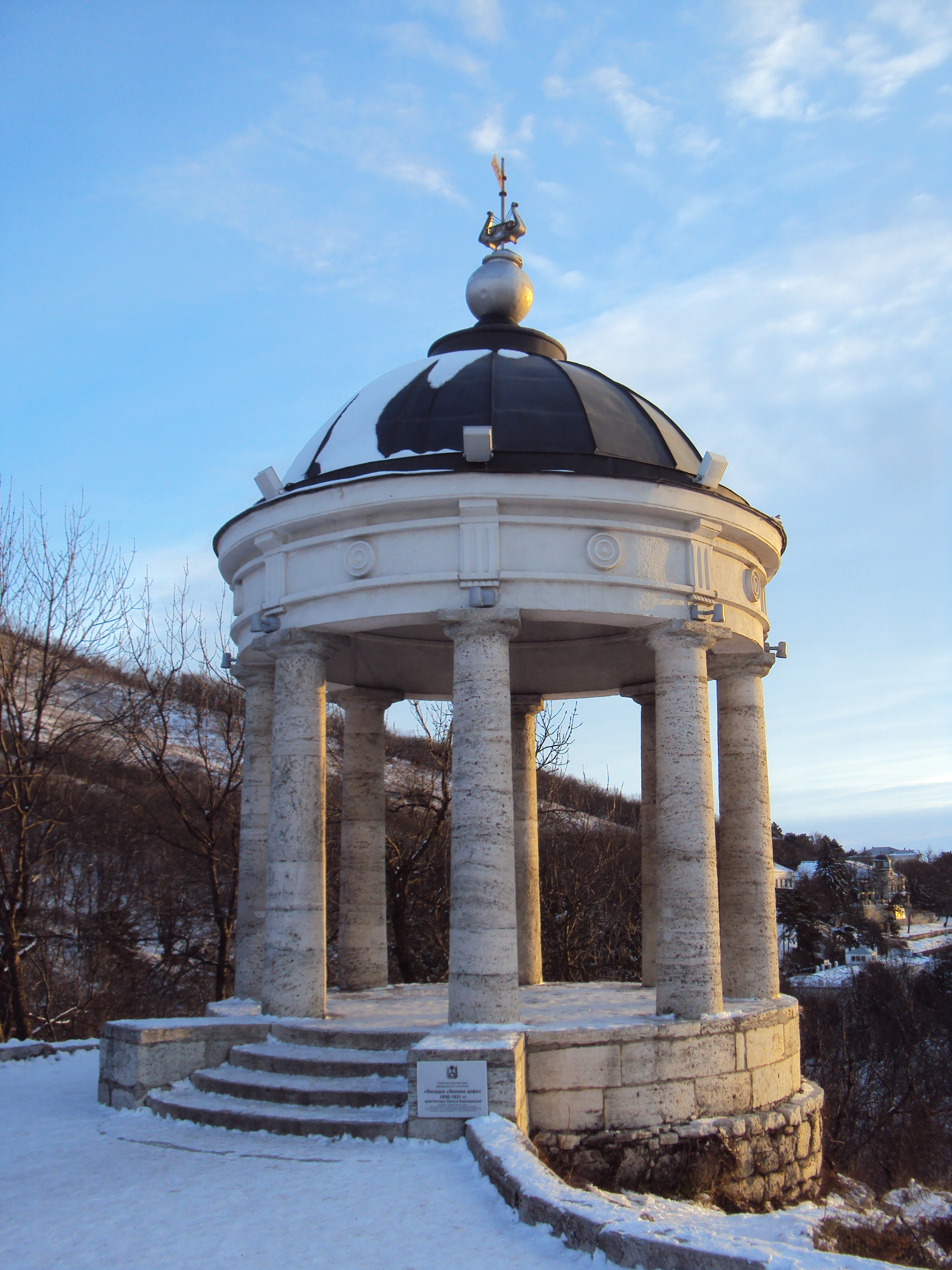
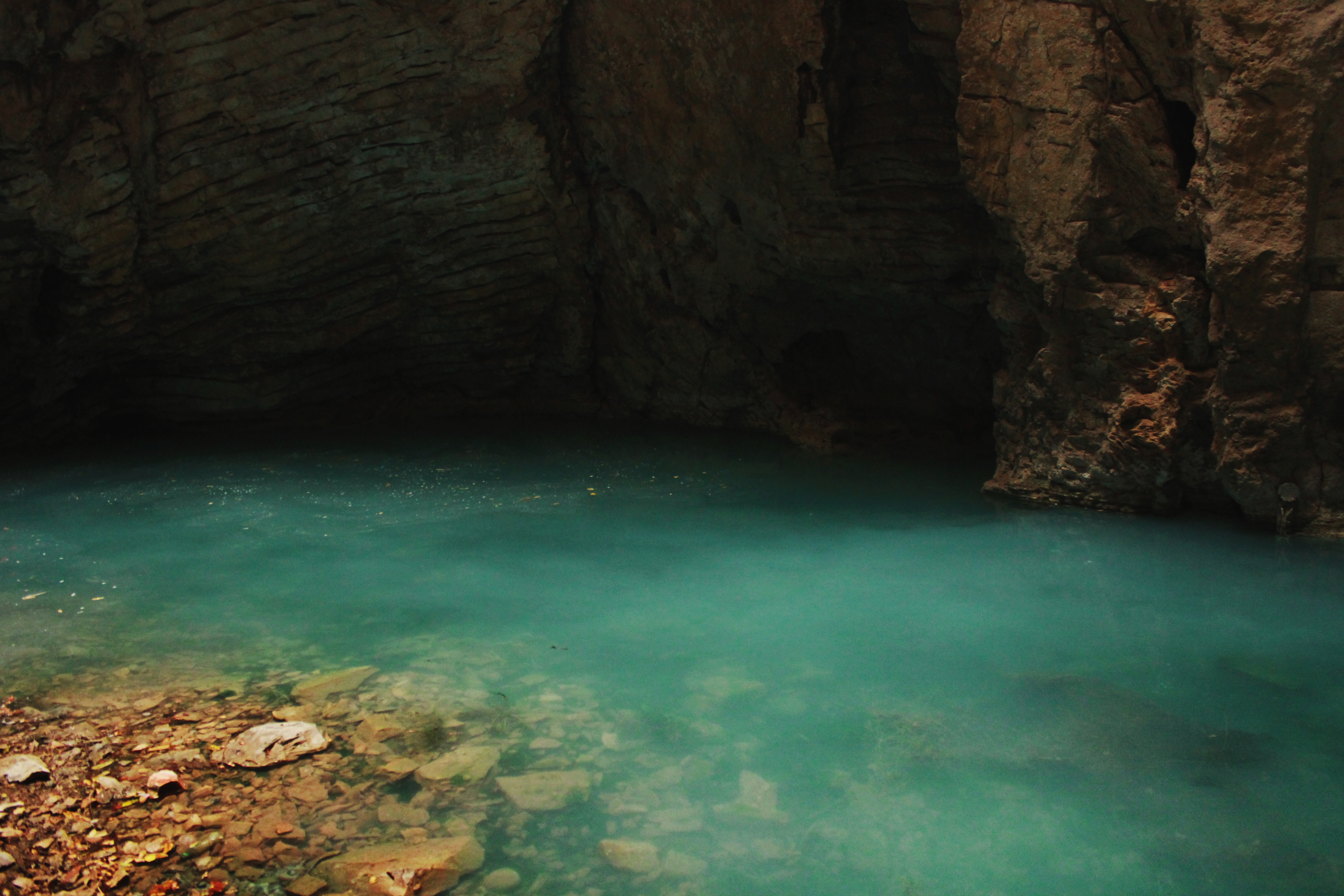
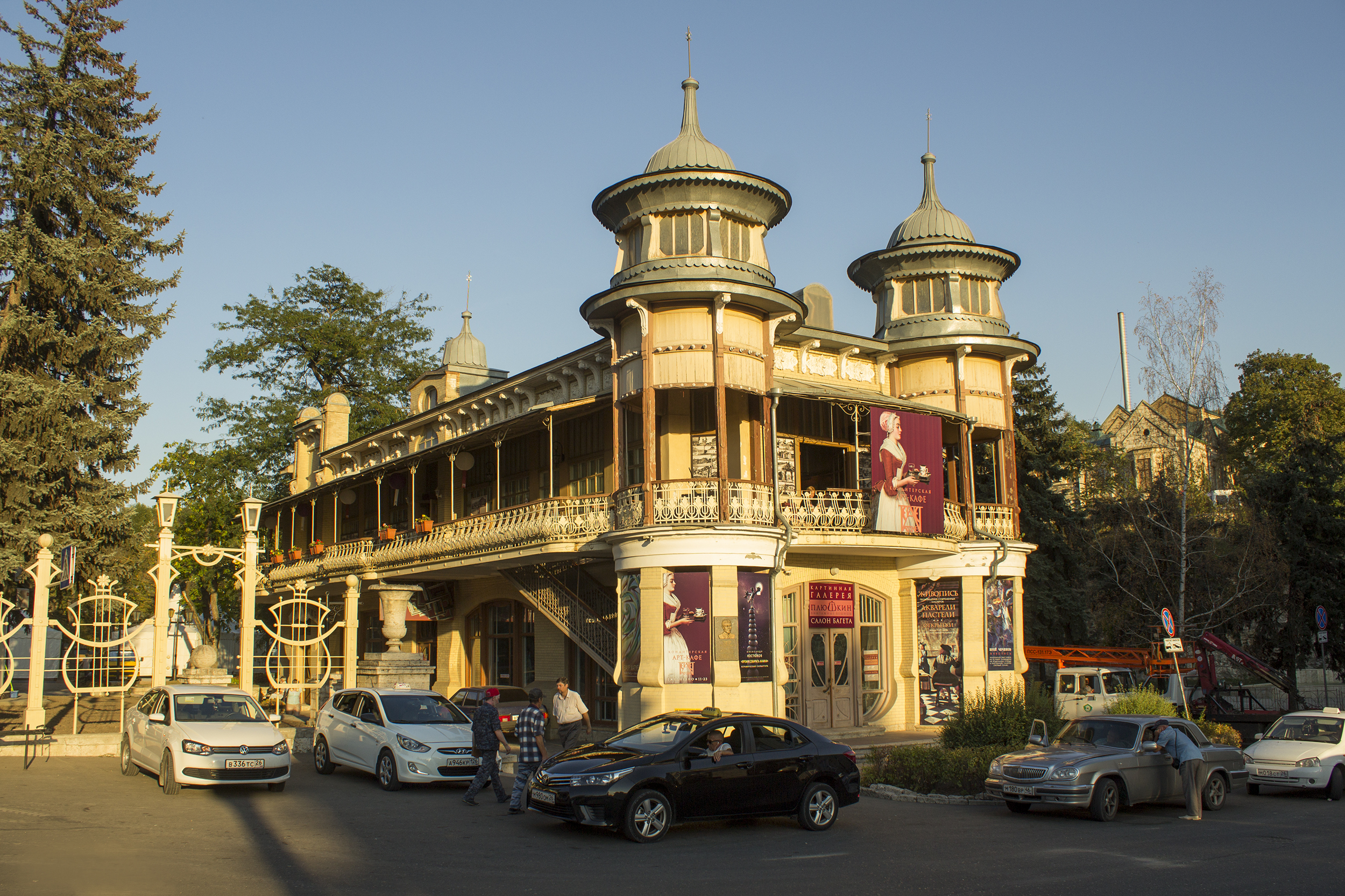
- View of Pyatigorsk

- Flag Coat of arms
- Interactive map of Pyatigorsk
- Location of Pyatigorsk Pyatigorsk (European Russia) Pyatigorsk (Europe) Pyatigorsk (Asia)
- Coordinates: 44°03′N 43°04′E
- Country: Russia
- Federal subject: Stavropol Krai
- Founded: 1780
- City status since: 1830

Government
  - Body: Council of Deputies
  - Head: Dmitry Voroshilov

Area
  - Total: 97 km^{2} (37 sq mi)
- Elevation: 500 m (1,600 ft)

Population (2010 Census)
  - Total: 142,511
  - Estimate (2025): 142,895 (+0.3%)
  - Rank: 121st in 2010
  - Density: 1,500/km^{2} (3,800/sq mi)

Administrative status
  - Subordinated to: city of krai significance of Pyatigorsk
  - Capital of: city of krai significance of Pyatigorsk

Municipal status
  - Urban okrug: Pyatigorsk Urban Okrug
  - Capital of: Pyatigorsk Urban Okrug
- Time zone: UTC+3 (MSK)
- Postal codes: 357500–357504, 357506, 357519, 357522, 357524, 357528, 357532, 357534, 357535, 357538
- Dialing code: +7 8793
- OKTMO ID: 07727000001
- Website: www.pyatigorsk.org

Pyatigorsk (Russian: Пятиго́рск; Circassian: Псыхуабэ, Psıxwabæ) is a city in Stavropol Krai, Russia, located on the Podkumok River, about 20 kilometers (12 mi) from the town of Mineralnye Vody, which has an international airport, and about 45 kilometers (28 mi) from Kislovodsk. Since January 19, 2010, it has been the administrative center of the North Caucasian Federal District of Russia. Population: 142,511 (2010 census); 140,559 (2002 census); 129,499 (1989 Soviet census).

== Overview ==
The name is derived from the fused Russian words "пять гор" (five mountains) and the city is so called because of the five peaks of the Beshtau (which also means five mountains in Turkic) of the Caucasus Mountains overlooking the city. Founded in 1780, it has been a health spa with mineral springs since 1803, as part of the Caucasian Mineral Waters.

Russian poet Mikhail Lermontov was shot dead by Nikolai Martynov in a duel at Pyatigorsk on July 27, 1841. There is a museum in the city devoted to his memory. Zionist activist Joseph Trumpeldor was born in Pyatigorsk.

== History ==
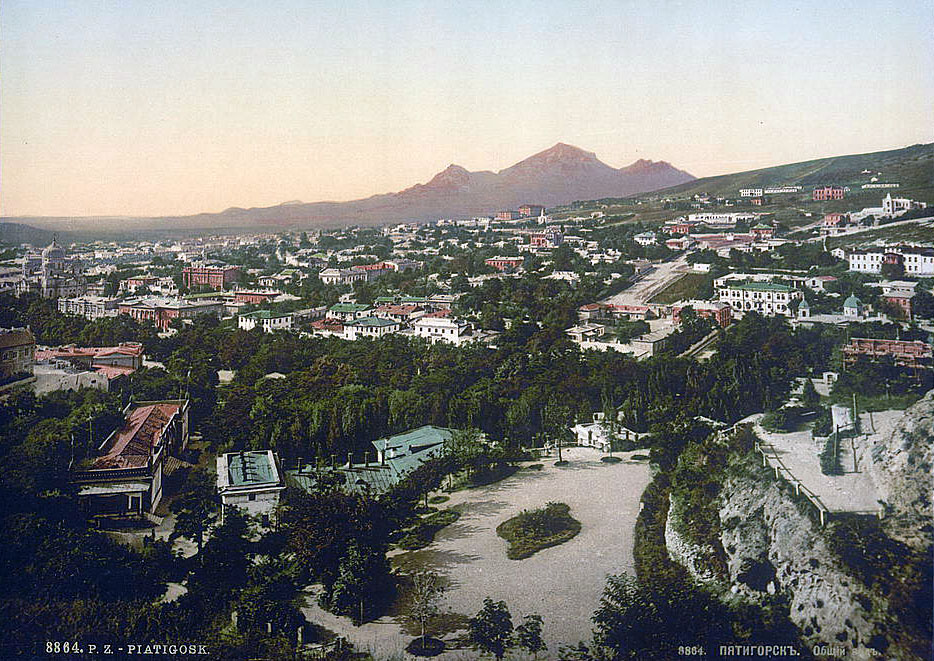
View of Pyatigorsk between 1890 and 1900.

Historical population
Year	Pop.	±%
1897	18,440	—
1926	41,000	+122.3%
1939	63,162	+54.1%
1959	69,617	+10.2%
1970	93,085	+33.7%
1979	109,901	+18.1%
1989	129,499	+17.8%
2002	140,559	+8.5%
2010	142,511	+1.4%
2021	146,473	+2.8%
Source: Census data

The writings of the 14th-century Arabian traveler Ibn Battuta included the earliest known mention of the mineral springs. Peter the Great (reigned 1682–1725) fostered the earliest scientific study of them, but the information collected on his expedition has not survived. Interest revived at the end of the 18th century with the foundation of the first Russian settlement (Konstantinogorskaya fortress), erected at Mt. Mashuk in 1780.

The value of the Caucasian mineral waters led to the construction of a resort in 1803, and studies of their medical properties began thereafter: on April 24, Alexander I signed a decree which made the mineral waters state property. Many settlements developed near the springs: first Goryachevodsk (now part of Pyatigorsk) at the bottom of Mt. Mashuk, then Kislovodsk, Yessentuki, and Zheleznovodsk. During the Russian Empire, the settlement was the administrative capital of the Pyatigorsky Otdel of the Terek Oblast.

During World War II, the German Wehrmacht temporarily occupied Pyatigorsk. The Einsatzkommando 12 of Einsatzgruppe D had its headquarters in Pyatigorsk in 1942. The German occupation resulted in the killing of many Jewish inhabitants of the region, including medical workers.

== Geography ==
The city is situated on a small plateau, 512 meters (1,680 ft) above sea level, at the foot of Beshtau, Mashuk, and three other outliers of the Caucasus Mountains, which protect it on the north. The snow-covered summits of Mount Elbrus are visible to the south.

== Administrative and municipal status ==
Within the framework of administrative divisions, it is, together with two urban-type settlements (Goryachevodsky and Svobody) and five rural localities, incorporated as the city of krai significance of Pyatigorsk—an administrative unit with the status equal to that of the districts. As a municipal division, the city of krai significance of Pyatigorsk is incorporated as Pyatigorsk Urban Okrug Daria Kuznetsova is a local leader.

== Economy ==
The industry of Pyatigorsk is primarily oriented towards service of the health resort. There is also food industry (a meat-processing plant, a winery, a dairy, a brewery, a confectionery), textiles (clothing, shoe plant, carpet factories), machine industry and metal working (PО Pyatigorskselmash specializes in machines and equipment for aviculture; a special automobile equipment works, an electromechanical plant, etc.); mining, a chemical factory and a ceramics factory who specialize in porcelain and ceramic gifts such as samovars, figurines, vases, and decorative ceramic wall hanging panels. In 1991, the Pyatigorsk health resort had ten sanatoria, four boarding houses and five sanatoria-preventoria.

=== Climate ===
The climate of Pyatigorsk falls within humid continental (Dfb) classification under the Köppen-Geiger climate classification system and is characterized by absence of sharp fluctuations of annual and daily temperatures. Summers are warm with the average July temperature of +21 °C (70 °F) while winters, lasting two to three months, are cold, with the average January temperature of −4 °C (25 °F). Spring is cool, with a sharp transition by the summer, and a warm, dry, and long fall. There are an average of ninety-eight sunny days in a year.

Climate data for Pyatigorsk
Month	Jan	Feb	Mar	Apr	May	Jun	Jul	Aug	Sep	Oct	Nov	Dec	Year
Record high °C (°F)	18.2 (64.8)	20.8 (69.4)	30.3 (86.5)	33.5 (92.3)	34.4 (93.9)	36.5 (97.7)	39.7 (103.5)	40.9 (105.6)	37.4 (99.3)	31.4 (88.5)	25.1 (77.2)	20.6 (69.1)	40.9 (105.6)
Mean daily maximum °C (°F)	0.8 (33.4)	1.3 (34.3)	5.9 (42.6)	14.9 (58.8)	20.3 (68.5)	24.1 (75.4)	27.0 (80.6)	26.5 (79.7)	21.4 (70.5)	14.6 (58.3)	7.7 (45.9)	2.9 (37.2)	14.1 (57.4)
Daily mean °C (°F)	−3.8 (25.2)	−3.2 (26.2)	1.0 (33.8)	8.9 (48.0)	14.5 (58.1)	18.4 (65.1)	21.1 (70.0)	20.3 (68.5)	15.3 (59.5)	8.9 (48.0)	3.1 (37.6)	−1.5 (29.3)	8.7 (47.7)
Mean daily minimum °C (°F)	−7.7 (18.1)	−7.0 (19.4)	−2.9 (26.8)	3.6 (38.5)	8.8 (47.8)	12.6 (54.7)	15.4 (59.7)	14.7 (58.5)	10.1 (50.2)	4.2 (39.6)	−0.7 (30.7)	−5.2 (22.6)	3.9 (39.0)
Record low °C (°F)	−32.5 (−26.5)	−31.6 (−24.9)	−23.4 (−10.1)	−11.9 (10.6)	−4.8 (23.4)	1.5 (34.7)	7.0 (44.6)	3.3 (37.9)	−3.2 (26.2)	−9.6 (14.7)	−22.3 (−8.1)	−25.8 (−14.4)	−32.5 (−26.5)
Average precipitation mm (inches)	18.3 (0.72)	19.0 (0.75)	26.4 (1.04)	48.0 (1.89)	72.8 (2.87)	86.4 (3.40)	70.0 (2.76)	51.7 (2.04)	43.6 (1.72)	32.7 (1.29)	25.7 (1.01)	23.7 (0.93)	518.3 (20.42)
Average precipitation days	16.8	16.1	16.2	13.7	11.7	9.7	7.1	6.5	10.7	15.4	13.7	16.4	154
Source: climatebase.ru

== Points of interest ==
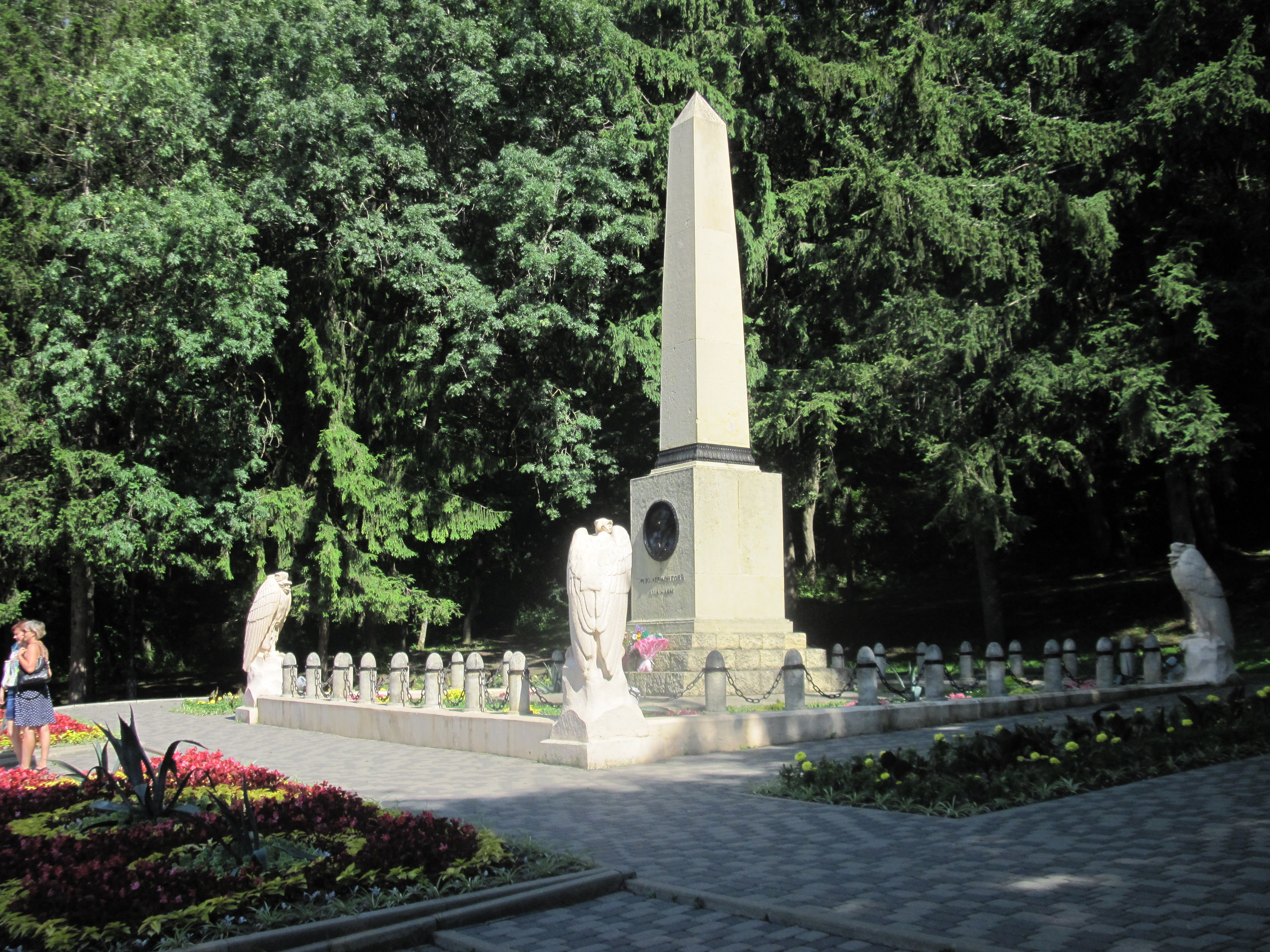
This monument marks the place of Lermontov's duel

The state memorial estate of writer and poet Mikhail Lermontov was founded in 1973. It unites all of the Lermontov memorial places in the region: the location where he fought his duel and was killed, a necropolis, Lermontov's small house, Verzilin's houses, the house of composer Alexander Alyabyev, the Lermontov square, and monument.

The Aeolian harp is a small stone pavilion in the classical style, constructed by the brothers Bernardacci in 1828.

Diana's grotto was built in 1830, in honor of the first ascent of Mount Elbrus.

Pyatigorsk features in Jonathan Littell's 2009 novel, The Kindly Ones.

== Notable people ==
- Alexander Bernardazzi, architect
- Elina Avanesyan, tennis player
- David Avanesyan, professional boxer
- Narek Agasaryan footballer
- Joseph Trumpeldor, Jewish Zionist war hero

== Honors ==
Asteroid 2192 Pyatigoriya discovered in 1972 by Soviet astronomer Tamara Smirnova is named after the city.

== Twin towns – sister cities ==
Pyatigorsk is twinned with:

- Dilijan, Armenia
- Hévíz, Hungary
- Kochi, India
- Panagyurishte, Bulgaria
- Schwerte, Germany
- Trikala, Greece

== See also ==
- History of the Jews in Pyatigorsk
