= Svobody =

Svobody Свободы
- Urban-type settlement
- Interactive map of Svobody
- Location of Svobody Svobody (Stavropol Krai)
- Coordinates: 44.0225°N 43.0708°E
- Country: Russia
- Federal subject: Stavropol Krai
- Founded: 1905
- Elevation: 495 m (1,624 ft)

Population (2010 Census)
  - Total: 18,042
  - Estimate (2025): 18,455 (+2.3%)
- Time zone: UTC+3 (MSK)
- Postal code: 357550
- OKTMO ID: 07727000061

Svobody (Russian: Свободы) is an urban locality (an urban-type settlement) in Stavropol Krai, in southern Russia. Population: 18,042 (2010 census); 17,349 (2002 census); 15,190 (1989 Soviet census).
