= List of flags with blue, red, and white stripes =

The flag of the Netherlands was likely the first tricolor with red, white, and blue bands, influencing many others.

Flags of white, red and blue stripes (bands) are closely associated with independence and the French Revolution. It can often signal the relationships of some nations with other nations (for instance, the flag of the Netherlands and flags of its former colonies).

The Dutch tricolor, the first known example of the tricolor, stood for liberty and republicanism, and the Netherlands flag influenced the tricolour flags of France and Russia.

The flag model was put forward in the French Revolution with the tricolore, a term which to this day, can refer to the flag of France directly, rather than all tricolors. The French tricolour has become one of the most influential flags in history, with its three-colour scheme being adopted by many other nations, both in Europe and the rest of the world, and, according to the Encyclopædia Britannica has historically stood "in symbolic opposition to the autocratic and clericalist royal standards of the past".

The British Union Jack was drawn up to represent the union of England and Scotland. The American flag or Stars and Stripes made a major contribution to the modern flag tradition and the idea of a flag representing both population and government, like the French flag after the Revolution.

The various blue, white, and red striped banners were adopted, somewhat changing the order and position of stripes (vertical and horizontal). The Russian flag was adopted by Peter the Great on the basis of the Dutch flag, during his effort to build a Western-oriented navy.

They also became the Pan-Slavic colors, particularly Austro-Slavism in countries that became independent from the Austro-Hungarian monarchy.

== Dual bands ==
- Chile, national, cantoned
- Second National Front of the Escambray
- Czech Republic, national, pall fesswise
- North Carolina, within USA, cantoned
- Texas, within USA, cantoned
  - Lubbock, within USA, charged
  - Murphy, within USA, charged
- La Rioja (Argentina), within Argentina, charged
- Kansas City, Missouri, within USA, charged

== Triband ==
Design	Entity, meaning	Status	Features of design	Origin
Horizontal triband
Blue-red-white	Rocha	Within Uruguay	Charged	
Blue-red-white	Sorbs	Ethnic		Pan-Slavic
Blue-white-red	Chile	1817–1818		
Blue-white-red	Principality of Lucca and Piombino	1805–1809		
Blue-white-red	Principality of Piombino	1805–1814		
Blue-white-red	M-19	Within Colombia		
Blue-white-red	Carpathia Ruthenia	Within Ukraine		
Blue-white-red	Patagonian Republican Movement	Within Argentina and Chile		
Blue-white-red	Kingdom of Slavonia	mid 1800s–1852; 1860–1918		Pan-Slavic
Blue-white-red	Kingdom of Serbs, Croats and Slovenes	1918–1929		Pan-Slavic
Blue-white-red	Kingdom of Yugoslavia	1929–1946		Pan-Slavic
Blue-white-red	Democratic Federal Yugoslavia	1943–1946	Charged	Pan-Slavic
Blue-white-red	Federal People's Republic of Yugoslavia	1946–1963	Charged	Pan-Slavic
Blue-white-red	Socialist Federal Republic of Yugoslavia	1963–1991	Charged	Pan-Slavic
Blue-white-red	Federal Republic of Yugoslavia	1992–2003		Pan-Slavic
Blue-white-red	Serbia and Montenegro	2003–2006		Pan-Slavic
Blue-white-red	Republic of Crimea	Within Russia		
Blue-white-red	Quetzaltenango	Within Mexico		
Blue-white-red	Autonomous Republic of Crimea	Within Ukraine		
Blue-white-red	Espírito Santo	Within Brazil	Charged	
Blue-white-red	Fort Smith	Within USA	Cantoned	
Blue-white-red	Gagauzia	Within Moldova	Charged	
Blue-white-red	Kayin State	Within Burma	Charged	
Blue-white-red	Khakassia	Within Russia	Vertical green band	Russian
Blue-white-red	Mannheim	Within Germany		
Blue-white-red	Masuria	Region in Poland		
Blue-white-red	Allied Democratic Forces	Within the Democratic Reopublic of the Congo		
Blue-white-red	Royal Yugoslav Army	Army flag of the Yugoslav Republic		
Blue-white-red	Mississippi	Within USA, 1894–2020	Cantoned	American
Blue-white-red	Mindanao	Within Philippines	Charged	
Blue-white-red	Sabah	Within Malaysia	Cantoned	
Blue-white-red	Schleswig-Holstein	Within Germany		
Blue-white-red	Valledupar	Within Colombia		
Blue-white-red	Standard of Army General of the Kingdom of Yugoslavia	The generals military force in Yugoslavia		
Blue-white-red	Standard of Division General of the Kingdom of Yugoslavia	Stardard general force of the Yugoslav Republic		
Blue-white-red	Flag of the Yugoslav Ground Forces (reverse)	The flag of the Ground forces of the Yugoslav Cantonment		
Blue-white-red	Socialist Republic of Bosnia and Herzegovina	Within Socialist Federal Republic of Yugoslavia, 1946–1992	In canton	Pan-Slavic
Blue-white-red	Mari El	Within Russia, 2006–2011	Charged	Russian
Blue-white-red	Pan-Slavic	Ethnic, since 1848		Russian
Blue-white-red	Rusyns	Ethnic	Charged	Pan-Slavic
Blue-white-red	Turov	Within Belarus		Russian
Red-blue-white	Serbia	National	Charged	Pan-Slavic
Red-blue-white	Misiones	Within Argentina		
Red-blue-white	Republika Srpska	Within Bosnia and Herzegovina		Pan-Slavic
Red-blue-white	Vojvodina	Within Serbia		Pan-Slavic
Red-blue-white	Kingdom of Montenegro	1905–1918	Charged	Pan-Slavic
Red-blue-white	Dubrovnik Republic	1991–1992		
Red-blue-white	Socialist Republic of Montenegro	Within Socialist Federal Republic of Yugoslavia, 1943–1992	Charged	Pan-Slavic
Red-blue-white	Montenegro	Within the Federal Republic of Yugoslavia, 1993–2004	Red-azure-white	Pan-Slavic
Red-blue-white	Kingdom of Serbia	1882–1918	Charged	Pan-Slavic
Red-blue-white	Socialist Republic of Serbia	Within Socialist Federal Republic of Yugoslavia, 1943–1992	Charged	Pan-Slavic
Red-blue-white	Serbia	1992–2004		Pan-Slavic
Red-blue-white	Serbian Krajina	Unrecognized, 1991–1995	Charged	Pan-Slavic
Red-blue-white	Eastern Slavonia, Baranja and Western Syrmia	Self-proclaimed, 1995–1998	Charged	Pan-Slavic
Red-blue-white	Serbian Orthodox Church	Religious	Charged	Pan-Slavic
Red-white-blue	Croatia	National	Charged	Pan-Slavic
Red-white-blue	Luxembourg	National	Red-white-azure	Dutch
Red-white-blue	Netherlands	National		Prince's Flag (oldest tricolour)
Red-white-blue	Paraguay	National	Charged	
Red-white-blue	Batavian Republic	1795–1806	Charged	Dutch
Red-white-blue	Orange Free State	1857–1902	In canton	Dutch
Red-white-blue	Malaita Province	Within Solomon Islands		
Red-white-blue	State of Slovenes, Croats and Serbs	1918		Pan-Slavic
Red-white-blue	South Africa	1928–1994	Element of charge	Dutch
Red-white-blue	Transvaal	1857–1874, 1875–1877, 1881–1902	Vertical green band	Dutch
Red-white-blue	Dallas	Within USA	Fimbriated, charged	
Red-white-blue	Fort Lauderdale	Within USA	Charged	
Red-white-blue	Labuan	Within Malaysia	Charged	
Red-white-blue	Lavalleja	Within Uruguay	Charged	
Red-white-blue	Missouri	Within USA	Charged	French
Red-white-blue	Mobile	Within USA	Charged	
Red-white-blue	Mordovia	Within Russia	Charged	Russian
Red-white-blue	New Orleans	Within USA	Charged	French, American
Red-white-blue	Odessa	Within USA	Charged	
Red-white-blue	Komi-Permyak Okrug	Within Russia	Charged	Russian
Red-white-blue	Samara Oblast	Within Russia	Charged	Russian
Red-white-blue	Samara	Within Russia	Charged	Russian
Red-white-blue	Kingdom of Croatia-Slavonia	Within Austria-Hungary, 1868–1918		Pan-Slavic
Red-white-blue	Socialist Republic of Croatia	Within Socialist Federal Republic of Yugoslavia, 1943–1990	Charged	Pan-Slavic
Red-white-blue	Flag of the Triglav unit			
Red-white-blue	Herzeg-Bosnia	Within Bosnia and Herzegovina, 1991–1996	Charged	Pan-Slavic
White-blue-red	Russia	National		Dutch
White-blue-red	Slovakia	National	Charged	Pan-Slavic
White-blue-red	Slovenia	National	Charged	Pan-Slavic
White-blue-red	Transnistria	Within Moldova; Co-national		Pan-Slavic
White-blue-red	Chukotka	Within Russia	In charge	Russian
White-blue-red	First Slovak Republic	1939–1945		Pan-Slavic
White-blue-red	Socialist Republic of Slovenia	Within Socialist Federal Republic of Yugoslavia, 1943–1990	Charged	Pan-Slavic
White-red-blue	Tricolour of the Czech Republic	Czech Republic		
White-red-blue	Maracaibo	Within Venezuela	Charged	
White-red-blue	Bydgoszcz	Within Poland	Charged	
White-red-blue	Flag of the Liberation Front			
White-red-blue	Manatí, Puerto Rico	Within Puerto Rico		
White-red-blue	Schaumburg-Lippe	Within Germany, 1880–1935		
White-red-blue	Polish National Government (January Uprising)	1863–1864		
White-red-blue	Protectorate of Bohemia and Moravia	Within Nazi Germany, 1939–1945		
Vertical triband
Blue-white-red	France	National		
Blue-white-red	Balilihan, Bohol	Within Philippines	Charged	
Blue-white-red	Bayonne	Within USA	Charged	
Blue-white-red	Bohol	Within Philippines	Charged	
Blue-white-red	Iowa	Within USA	Charged	French
Blue-white-red	Madawaska	Within USA	Charged	
Blue-white-red	Novgorod Oblast	Within Russia	Charged	Russian
Blue-white-red	French Southern and Antarctic Lands	Within France	In canton	French
Blue-white-red	Timóteo	Within Brazil	Charged	
Blue-white-red	Wallis and Futuna	Within France, unofficial	In canton	French
Blue-white-red	Aleppo	Within France, 1920–1924	In canton	French
Blue-white-red	Alawite State	Within France, 1920–1938	In canton	French
Blue-white-red	Annam	Within France, 1874–1949	In canton	French
Blue-white-red	Gabon	Within France, 1959–1960	In canton	French
Blue-white-red	Laos	Within French Indochina, 1893–1953	In canton	French
Blue-white-red	Louisiana	Within Confederate States of America, unofficial, 1861	Charged	French
Blue-white-red	Togo	Within France, 1957–1958	In canton	French
Blue-white-red	Tunisia	Unofficial, within France, 1881–1956	In canton	French
Blue-white-red	Acadian	Ethnic	Charged	French
Red-white-blue	France	1790–1794		
Red-white-blue	Alagoas	Within Brazil	Charged	
Red-white-blue	Cleveland	Within USA	Charged	American
Red-white-blue	Córdoba	Within Argentina	Charged	
Red-white-blue	Santa Fe	Within Argentina	Charged	
Red-white-blue	Teresópolis	Within Brazil	Charged	
Red-white-blue	Tango	International maritime signal		
Red-white-blue	Three	International maritime signal	Pennon	
Other triband
Top right to bottom left	Primorsky Krai	Within Russia	Charged	Russian
Top right to bottom left	Franco-American Flag	Ethnic	Charged	French

== Five bands ==
Design	Entity, meaning	Status	Features of design
Horizontal five bands
Blue, white, red, white, blue	Cabo Verde	National	Charged
Blue, white, red, white, blue	Costa Rica	National	Five-striped
Blue, white, red, white, blue	North Korea	National	Charged five-striped
Blue, white, red, white, blue	Allied-occupied Germany	1946–1949	Swallowtail
Blue, white, red, white, blue	Charlie	International maritime signal	
Red, white, blue, white, red	Thailand	National	Five-striped
Red, white, blue, white, red	Erie	Within USA	Charged five-striped
Others	Bahia	State within Brazil	Cantoned
Others	Richmond	Within USA	Fimbriated, charged
Others	Kirghizia	Within USSR, 1952–1992	Charged five-striped
Others	Puerto Rico	Within USA	
Others	Ohio	US state	
Others	Cuba	National	
Vertical five bands
Blue, white, red, white, blue	Santiago del Estero	Within Argentina	Charged

== More than five bands ==
- United States of America, national, cantoned
- Hawaii, within USA, cantoned
- Liberia, national, cantoned
- Malaysia, national, cantoned
- Kuala Lumpur, within Malaysia, charged
- Serapis flag of the American Revolution, cantoned
- Louisiana, within Confederate States of America, 1861, cantoned

== Different directions ==
- Duchy of Modena and Reggio, 1830–1859
- Netherlands Antilles, within Netherlands, cantoned, 1954–2010
- Entre Ríos, within Argentina
- Arlington, within USA, charged
- Memphis, within USA, charged
- Tuamotus, within French Polynesia, charged
- United Kingdom (Union Jack), national flag
  - List of countries and territories with the Union Jack displayed on their flag
- Norway, national
- Iceland, national
- Assyrian, ethnic flag
- Pará within Brazil, charged
- Amazonas within Brazil, cantoned
- Ohio within the United States

== See also ==
- List of flags by color combination
- List of flags by design
- Tricolor
