= Gani Bobi =

Kosovar philosopher and sociologist (1943–1995)

Gani Bobi (Serbian Cyrillic: Гани Боби; 20 November 1943 – 17 July 1995) was an Albanian philosopher and sociologist from Kosovo.

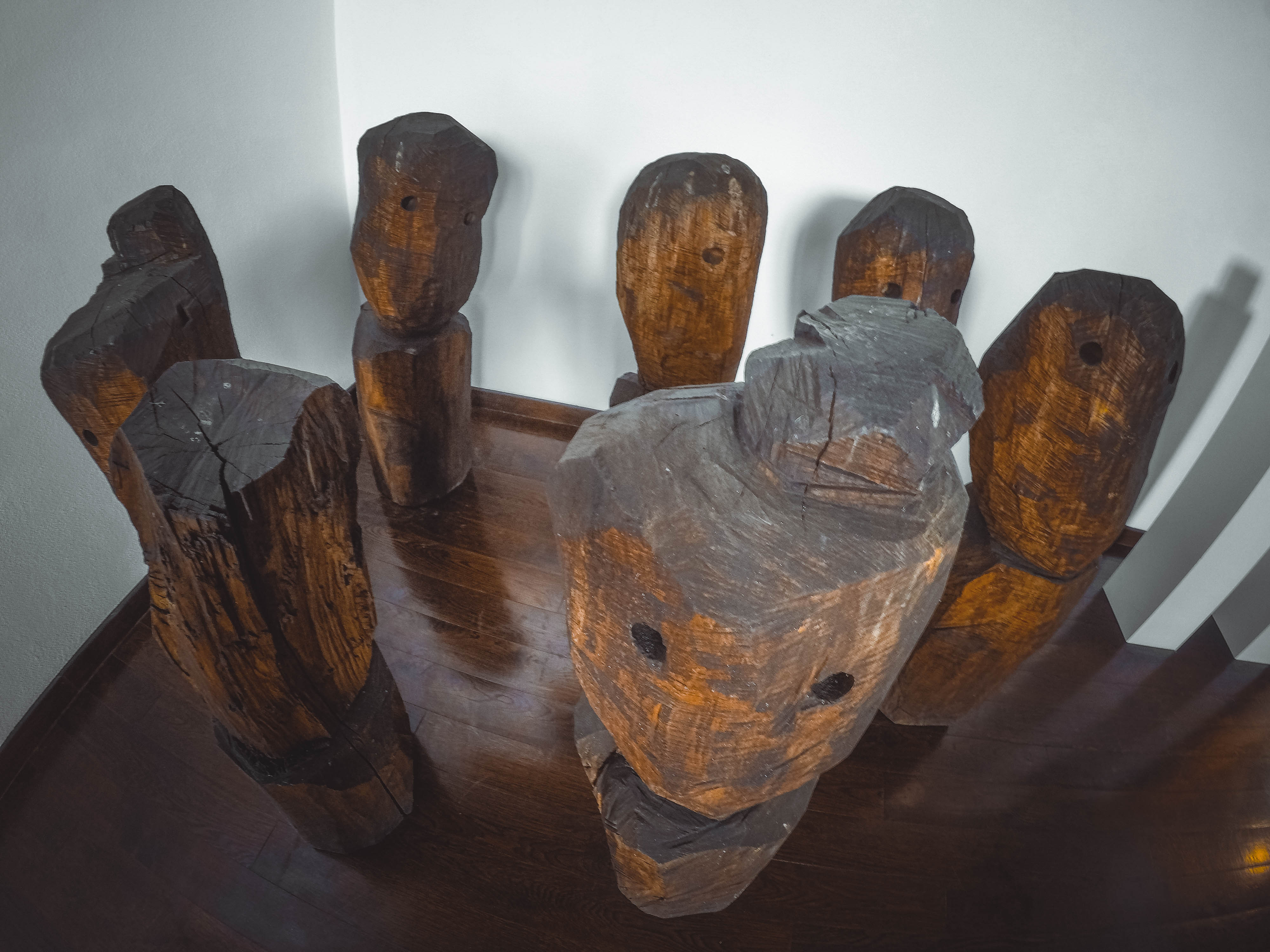

He was born in Lubenić, municipality of Peć, at the time Democratic Federal Yugoslavia. He was one of the first Albanian professors of sociology and philosophy at the University of Pristina (1981). He got a doctorate degree in sociology at the University of Belgrade Faculty of Philosophy in 1986 after finishing his studies in language and literature at the University of Pristina. He lived in Pristina. His publications have been published in five volumes called Vepra. Among his main publications were Sprovimet e modernitetit (1982), Paradoks kulturor (1986) and Konteksti i vetëkulturës (1994), some of them translated into English and Serbian.

Gani Bobi Center for Social Studies founded by Shkëlzen Maliqi was named after him.

During his later days he worked as editor of philosophy at Koha magazine published in Pristina in 1994.

Agim Çavdarbasha' 1987 sculpture The Women of Lybeniq shows women leaning to see Bobi's funeral.

== See also ==
- Shkelzen Maliqi
- Ismail Kadare
- Muhamedin Kullashi
- Fatos Lubonja
- Agon Hamza
