= National anthem of Yugoslavia =

The national anthem of Yugoslavia may refer to:

- The "National Anthem of the Kingdom of Yugoslavia", in use from 1919 to 1941
- "Hey, Slavs", in use by the Socialist Federal Republic of Yugoslavia from 1943 to 1991 and by the Federal Republic of Yugoslavia from 1992 to 2003

== See also ==
- Flag of Yugoslavia
- Coat of arms of Yugoslavia
