= Emblems of the Yugoslav Socialist Republics =

The emblems of the Yugoslav socialist republics were defined by each of its six constituent republics. Emblems appeared as a symbol of statehood on the documents of republican level, for example on the signs of the republican institutions, on watermarks of school diplomas, etc.

The emblems included old historical symbols where they could demonstrate historical compatibility with the new socialist political system – see Croatian and Serbian traditional emblem in the middle of their coats of arms; also Slovenian Mount Triglav was recognized as a symbol of Slovenian Liberation Front during the National Liberation War during World War II. Where the old symbols were deemed inappropriate (the traditional cross or eagle on the Serbian coat of arms, ethnic or religious coat of arms for Bosnia and Herzegovina, the former traditionally monarchist symbol or the historical lion for Montenegro or the historical lion for Macedonia), prominent features or unofficial national symbols were added, e.g. Mount Lovćen for Montenegro, or a pair of chimneys for Bosnia and Herzegovina. The same with the federal Yugoslav emblem: all separate republican emblems featured a red star and wheat, or other important plants from that region.

While most republics adopted new official arms during the breakup of Yugoslavia, Serbia (as a constituent state of the Federal Republic of Yugoslavia) retained the emblem from the Yugoslav era until 2004. The present-day arm of North Macedonia is still near identical to the Yugoslav one.

The individual emblems of the six Yugoslav socialist republics were as follows:

Republic	Emblem	Author	Republic-specific features		Present-day coat of arms
Bosnia and Herzegovina		Unknown	Plants	Deciduous twig (left), Conifer twig (right), two sheaves of wheat (lower middle portion)	Coat of arms of Bosnia and Herzegovina
Bosnia and Herzegovina		Unknown	Landscapes, geographic features	Silhouette of Jajce	Coat of arms of Bosnia and Herzegovina
Bosnia and Herzegovina		Unknown	Industry	two factory chimneys	Coat of arms of Bosnia and Herzegovina
Bosnia and Herzegovina		Unknown	Ornaments	red ribbon	Coat of arms of Bosnia and Herzegovina
Croatia		Antun Augustinčić and Vanja Radauš	Plants	Wheat	Coat of arms of Croatia
Croatia		Antun Augustinčić and Vanja Radauš	Landscapes, geographic features	Adriatic Sea, rising sun	Coat of arms of Croatia
Croatia		Antun Augustinčić and Vanja Radauš	Industry	Iron anvil	Coat of arms of Croatia
Croatia		Antun Augustinčić and Vanja Radauš	Ornaments	Chequy	Coat of arms of Croatia
Macedonia		Vasilije Popović–Cico	Plants	Garland of wheat, tobacco leaves and poppy buds	Emblem of North Macedonia
Macedonia		Vasilije Popović–Cico	Landscapes, geographic features	River Vardar, Mount Korab, sunrise, sky	Emblem of North Macedonia
Macedonia		Vasilije Popović–Cico	Industry	–	Emblem of North Macedonia
Macedonia		Vasilije Popović–Cico	Ornaments	red ribbon with traditional Macedonian embroidery	Emblem of North Macedonia
Montenegro		Milan Božović and Milo Milunović	Plants	laurel wreath	Coat of arms of Montenegro
Montenegro		Milan Božović and Milo Milunović	Landscapes, geographic features	Mount Lovćen, Adriatic Sea	Coat of arms of Montenegro
Montenegro		Milan Božović and Milo Milunović	Industry	–	Coat of arms of Montenegro
Montenegro		Milan Božović and Milo Milunović	Ornaments	Montenegrin tricolour of Pan-Slavic colors	Coat of arms of Montenegro
Serbia		Đorđe Andrejević Kun	Plant	sheaf of wheat (left), sheaf of oak leaves with acorns (right)	Coat of arms of Serbia
Serbia		Đorđe Andrejević Kun	Landscapes, geographic features	sunrise, sky	Coat of arms of Serbia
Serbia		Đorđe Andrejević Kun	Industry	cog-wheel	Coat of arms of Serbia
Serbia		Đorđe Andrejević Kun	Ornaments	red ribbon (with inscriptions), Serbian traditional symbol	Coat of arms of Serbia
Slovenia		Branko Simčič	Plants	wheat, leaves of linden	Coat of arms of Slovenia
Slovenia		Branko Simčič	Landscapes, geographic features	Triglav, sea	Coat of arms of Slovenia
Slovenia		Branko Simčič	Industry	–	Coat of arms of Slovenia
Slovenia		Branko Simčič	Ornaments	red ribbon	Coat of arms of Slovenia

== See also ==
- Emblem of Yugoslavia
- Coat of arms of Bosnia and Herzegovina
- Coat of arms of Croatia
- Emblem of North Macedonia
- Coat of arms of Montenegro
- Coat of arms of Serbia
- Coat of arms of Slovenia
- Socialist-style emblems
