= Shkëlzen Maliqi =

Kosovar philosopher (born 1947)

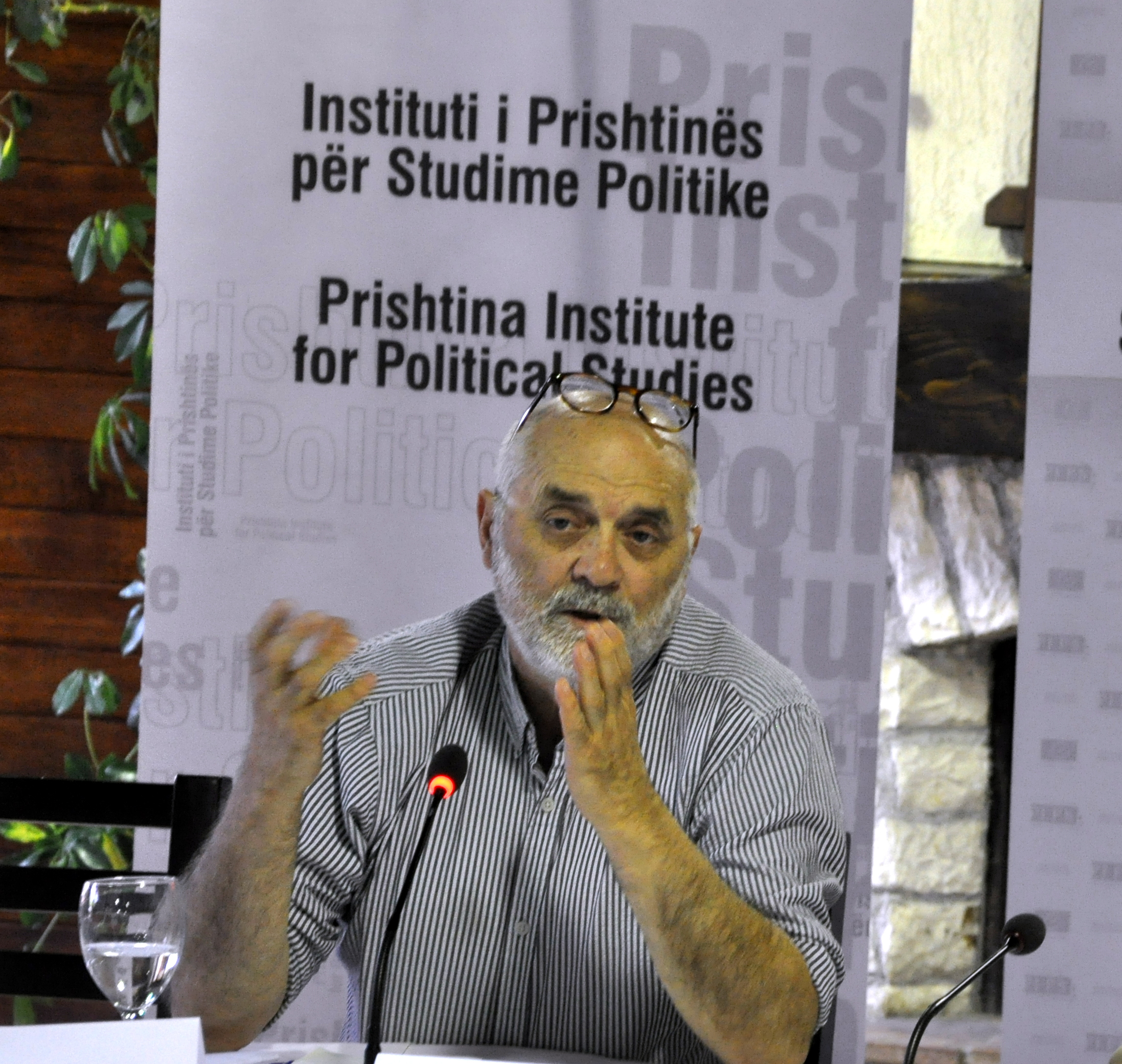
- Born: 26 October 1947 (age 78); Orahovac, SFR Yugoslavia

Shkëlzen Maliqi (born 26 October 1947) is a Kosovar philosopher, art critic, political analyst and intellectual. During the early 1990s, Shkelzen was also directly involved in politics. He was one of the founders of the Social Democratic Party of Kosovo and served as its first president from 1991 to 1993. He also held leading positions in civil society organisations such as the Kosovo Civil Society Foundation (1995–2000) and the Kosovo Helsinki Committee (1990–1997).

Maliqi has published several books on art and politics in Albanian, English, Italian, Spanish, and Serbian. From the beginning of the 1980s, he has been a regular contributor to the most important media outlets in Kosovo and the former Yugoslavia. Maliqi lives in Pristina and heads the "Gani Bobi" Institute for Social Studies.

== See also ==
- Gani Bobi
- Muhamedin Kullashi
- Fatos Lubonja
