= Nebojša Đorđević (footballer) =

Yugoslav and Serbian footballer (1945–2023)

Personal information
- Full name: Nebojša Đorđević
- Date of birth: 21 May 1945
- Place of birth: Belgrade, FS Serbia, DF Yugoslavia
- Date of death: September 2023 (aged 78)
- Place of death: Belgrade, Serbia
- Height: 1.87 m (6 ft 2 in)
- Position: Goalkeeper

Youth career
- Red Star Belgrade

Senior career*
Years	Team	Apps	(Gls)
1965–1968	Voždovački	77	(1)
1968–1973	OFK Beograd	92	(0)
1973–1975	Sabadell	22	(0)
1976–1978	OFK Beograd	44	(0)
Total		235	(1)
- * Club domestic league appearances and goals

Nebojša Đorđević (Serbian Cyrillic: Небојша Ђорђевић; 21 May 1945 – September 2023) was a Yugoslav and Serbian professional footballer who played as a goalkeeper.

== Career ==
After spending three seasons with Voždovački in the Yugoslav Second League, Đorđević switched to OFK Beograd, making 92 appearances in the Yugoslav First League between 1968 and 1973.

In 1973, Đorđević moved abroad to Spain and signed with Segunda División club Sabadell. He later returned to OFK Beograd to finish his career.
