= Federal Yugoslavia =

Federal Yugoslavia may refer to:

- Democratic Federal Yugoslavia, from 1943 to 1945
- Federal People's Republic of Yugoslavia, the name of Socialist Federal Republic of Yugoslavia from 1945 to 1963
- Federal Republic of Yugoslavia, the name of Serbia and Montenegro from 1992 to 2003
