= Coat of arms of Serbia and Montenegro =

- Armiger: Federal Republic of Yugoslavia; State Union of Serbia and Montenegro
- Adopted: 22 October 1993
- Earlier version: Emblem of SFRY ad hoc used until 1993.
- Use: As official emblem of the State Union of Serbia and Montenegro, 1993-2006.
- Designer: Bogdan Kršić

The coat of arms of Serbia and Montenegro consisted of a shield with the Serbian eagle (a white double-headed eagle adopted from the Nemanjić dynasty) and the shield with a quartering the Serbian cross (or cross with firesteels) and the Montenegrin lion of Saint Mark (a lion passant adopted from the Republic of Venice). This emblem had served as the national symbol of the State Union of Serbia and Montenegro (known as the Federal Republic of Yugoslavia until 2003).

== Official status ==
Before adopting this coat of arms, the FR Yugoslavia used the emblem of the Socialist Federal Republic of Yugoslavia on some documents. The coat of arms was officially adopted by the federal parliament in 1993. Usage of the arms was discontinued in 2006, after the dissolution of the State Union of Serbia and Montenegro.

== Usage under the 2003 State Union ==
The legal acts which reconstituted the Federal Republic of Yugoslavia into the State Union of Serbia and Montenegro stipulated that a law was to be passed by the end of 2003 specifying the Union's coat of arms and anthem. Such a law was never brought forward, and unlike with the national flag and state anthem, no notable proposals for a new coat of arms were ever put forward. Thus the State Union continued to use the 1993 coat by inertia until its dissolution in June 2006.

== Heraldic description ==
Gules, a Two-headed eagle Argent, en surtout an inescutcheon, quarterly 1 and 4 a lion passant Or (Montenegro) and 2 and 3, a cross between four fire steels Argent. (Serbia)

== Origins of coat of arms ==
The coat of arms was designed after the breakup of the former Socialist Federal Republic of Yugoslavia, to symbolise the new union consisting only of Serbia and Montenegro. Its design thus features the traditional heraldical elements connected historically with both countries.

Throughout history, the arms of both Montenegro and Serbia have featured a double-headed eagle, usually silver, on a shield, usually red, bearing on their chests usually a red shield, which in Montenegro's case contained a golden lion while in Serbia's a cross with four firesteels, usually silver. Thus the arms of FR Yugoslavia were designed by combining these elements: the eagle is the symbol common to both countries, symbolizing their unity, the lions represent Montenegro and crosses with firesteels, Serbia. The red shield in the middle was divided into 4 parts, although the federation consisted of 2 federal units. This was done with the intention to accommodate any possible further expansion of the federation.

The coat of arms was initially proposed by Aleksandar Palavestra of the Serbian Heraldry Society in 1992. The final, adopted version (designed by Bogdan Kršić) followed the same blason as the original proposal but differed in graphical style.

== Emblems of the Yugoslav Republics/Serbian-Montenegrin Union ==
Coat of arms of Serbia
(1947–2004)

Coat of arms of Serbia
(2004–2010)

Coat of arms of Montenegro
(1945–1993)

Coat of arms of Montenegro
(1993–2004)

Coat of arms of Montenegro
(since 2004)

== See also ==
- Flag of Serbia and Montenegro
- Coat of arms of Serbia
- Coat of arms of Montenegro
- Double-headed eagle
