= Agim Çavdarbasha =

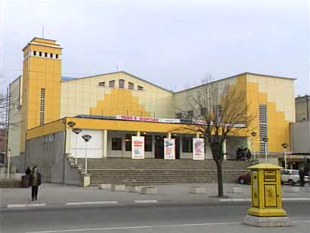
National Theatre in Pristina

Agim Çavdarbasha (Serbo-Croatian: Agim Čavdarbaša, Агим Чавдарбаша) (24 March 1944 – 20 October 1999) was a Kosovo Albanian sculptor. Çavdarbasha was a major influence on contemporary sculpture in Kosovo.

Born in Peć, Democratic Federal Yugoslavia (modern-day Peja, Kosovo), he graduated from the Academy of Applied Arts of Belgrade in 1969 and the Academy of Arts of Ljubljana in 1971.

He was a member of the Academy of Figurative of Arts of Kosovo and later of the Academy of Science and Arts.

His atelier in Čaglavica was put to flame during the 2004 unrests, but was rebuilt and today stands as a museum.

== Works ==
His works include the statues of Ymer Prizreni and Abdyl Frashëri displayed at the League of Prizren museum. During the Kosovo War, Serbian policemen threw the statues into a nearby river and the museum was burnt.

His 1987 sculpture The Women of Lybeniq shows women leaning to see Gani Bobi's funeral.
