= Emblem of Yugoslavia =

Versions
- Emblem of FPR Yugoslavia (1946–1963). This version featured five torches that represented the brotherhood and unity of the five Yugoslav nations. The sixth torch in the later version was added for the Bosnian Muslims.

- Emblem of Democratic Federal Yugoslavia (1943–1946).
- Armiger: Yugoslavia
- Adopted: 1963
- Crest: Red star
- Shield: Five torches burning together
- Supporters: Wheat
- Other elements: Blue ribbon with a text imprinting the date: 29 November 1943
- Use: As official emblem of Yugoslavia

The Emblem of Yugoslavia featured six torches, surrounded by wheat with a red star at its top, and burning together in one flame; this represented the brotherhood and unity of the six federal republics forming Yugoslavia: Bosnia and Herzegovina, Croatia, Macedonia, Montenegro, Serbia and Slovenia. The date imprinted was 29 November 1943, the day the Anti-Fascist Council for the National Liberation of Yugoslavia (AVNOJ) met in Jajce on its second meeting and formed the basis for post-war organisation of the country, establishing a federal republic. This day was celebrated as Republic Day after the establishment of the republic. The emblem of Yugoslavia, along with those of its constituent republics, are an example of socialist-style emblems.

== History ==
=== Kingdom of Yugoslavia ===
The coat of arms of the 1918–1941 Kingdom of Yugoslavia (called the Kingdom of Serbs, Croats and Slovenes until 1929) evolved from the coat of arms of Serbia. Graphically the coats of arms were similar, featuring only two major differences, the first difference being the royal crowns. The royal Serbian coat of arms depicts the general heraldic crown, while the royal Yugoslav coat of arms depicted the ruling Karađorđević dynastic crown.

The second difference involved the shield surmounted on the white double-headed eagle. The previous Serbian coat of arms depicted only the Serbian tetragrammatic cross, representing only the Serbs. When Yugoslavia formed in 1918, the surmounted shield changed to include symbolism for the newly integrated Croats (red-and-white chequerboard) and Slovenes, as the three official nations of Yugoslavia. The coat of arms includes three golden six-pointed stars arranged in the form of an upside-down triangle, adopted from the Slovenian coat-of-arms of the family of the Counts of Celje. An image of the royal Yugoslav coat of arms appears on the 10-Yugoslav dinar banknote of 1926.

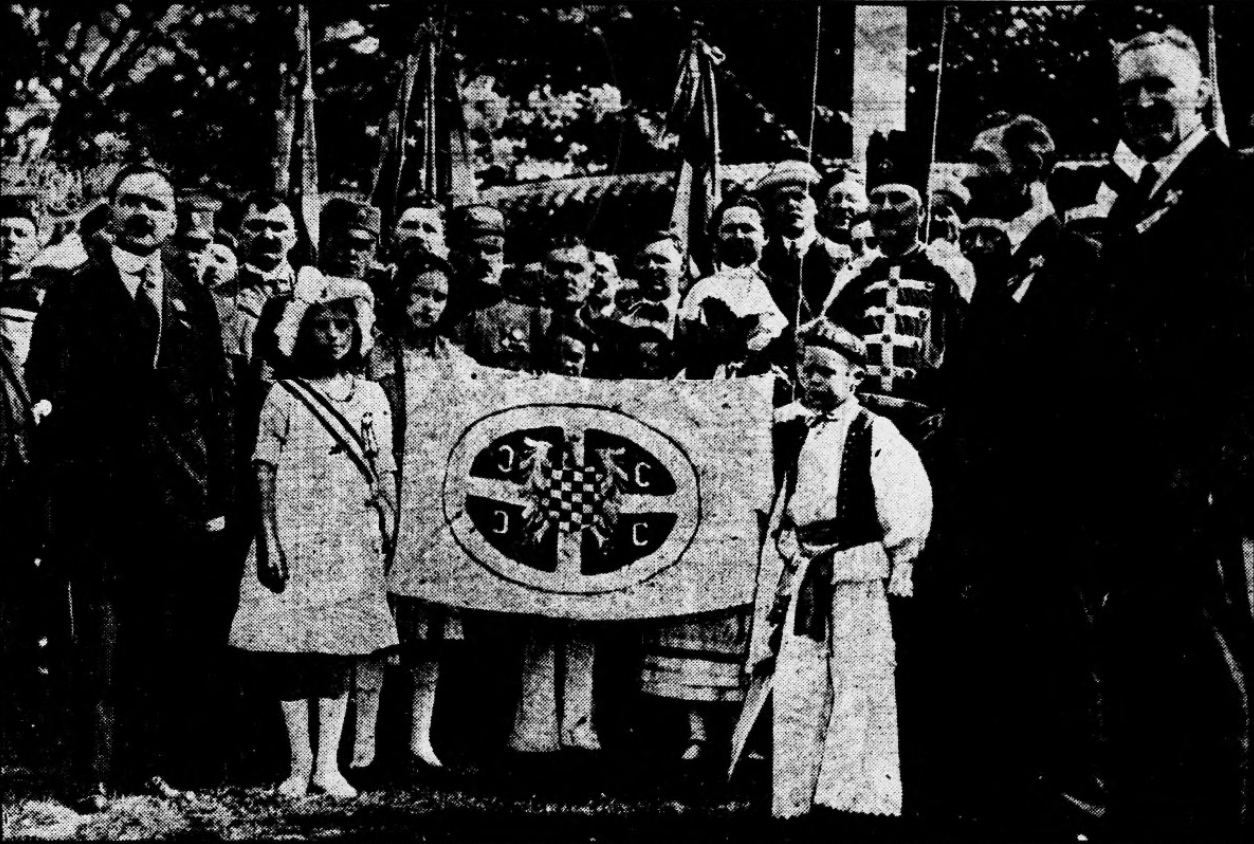
Emblem raised in behalf of American Serbs, Croats and Slovenes on 4 July 1918 in Washington, D.C.

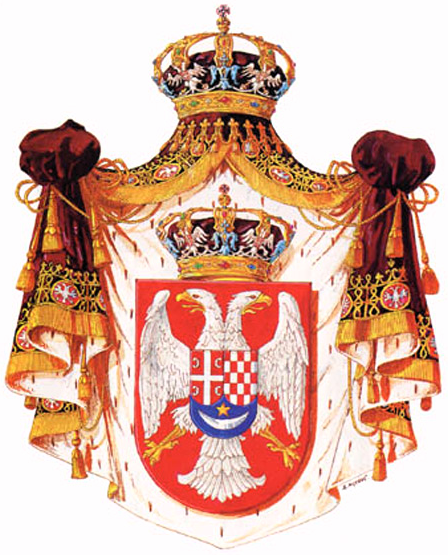
First coat of arms (1918–1921) of the Kingdom of Serbs, Croats and Slovenes

Greater coat of arms of Kingdom of Yugoslavia (1921–1941)

Lesser coat of arms of Kingdom of Yugoslavia (1921–1941)

=== Socialist Federal Republic of Yugoslavia ===
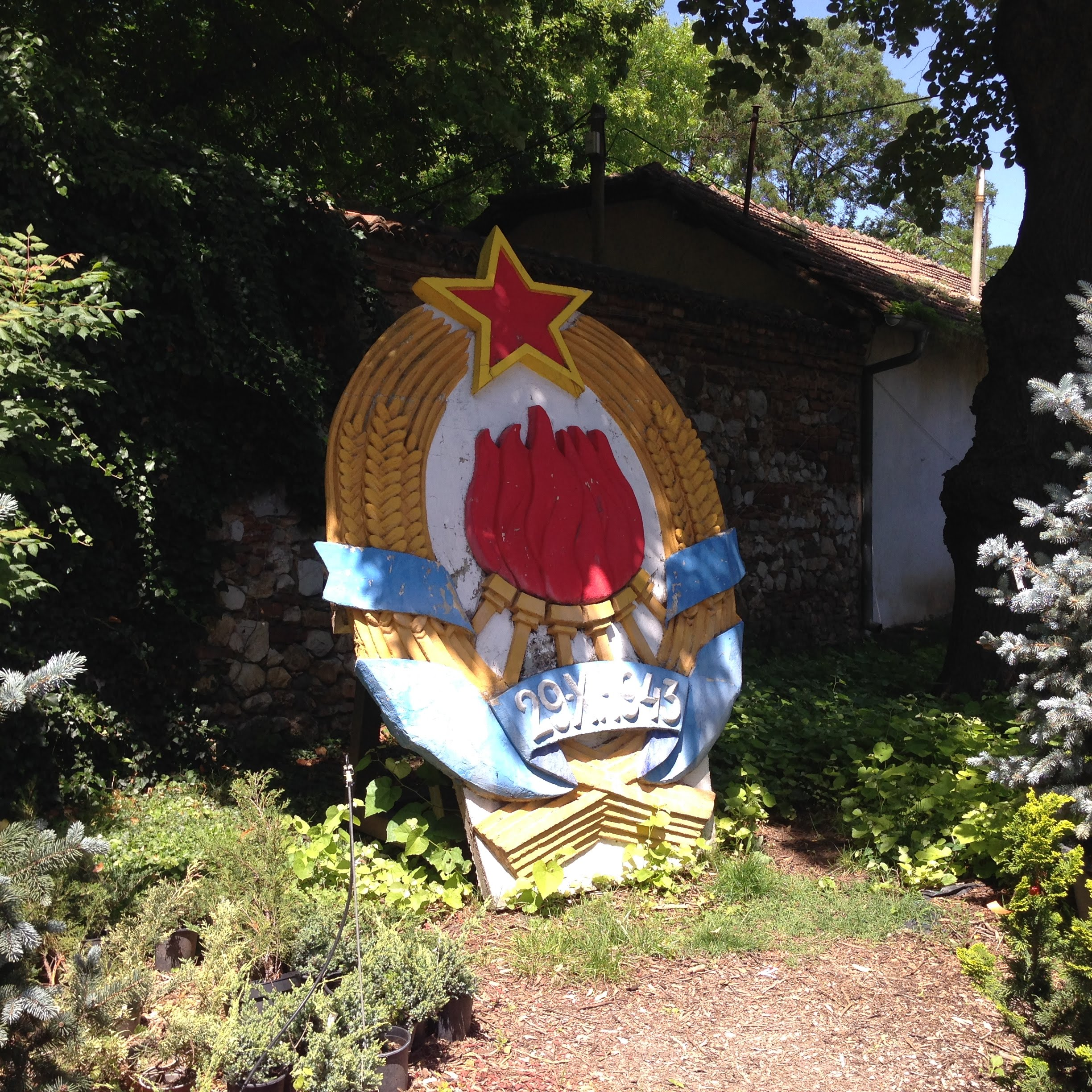
Emblem once placed on the building of University of Niš, restored and repainted and now located in the city garden of Niš Fortress

During World War II (1943–1945), the Yugoslav state was named Democratic Federal Yugoslavia (DFY), in 1945 it was renamed Federal People's Republic of Yugoslavia (FPRY), and again in 1963 into Socialist Federal Republic of Yugoslavia (SFRY). The emblem of socialist Yugoslavia was designed in 1943 and remained in use up to 1963, when the country underwent reforms and was renamed for the final time. It featured five torches surrounded by wheat and burning together in one flame; this represented the brotherhood and unity of the five nations of SFRY: Croats, Macedonians, Montenegrins, Serbs and Slovenes. The Muslims were not then represented as a constituent nation.

As part of the 1963 reforms, the name of the country was changed into Socialist Federal Republic of Yugoslavia and its emblem was redesigned to represent six Yugoslav federal republics (instead of the five nations). The new emblem was the final version with six torches, and was in official use until 30 October 1993 (past the country's dissolution in 1992). The date in the insignia remained in the new emblem.

Stamp version used on printed materials

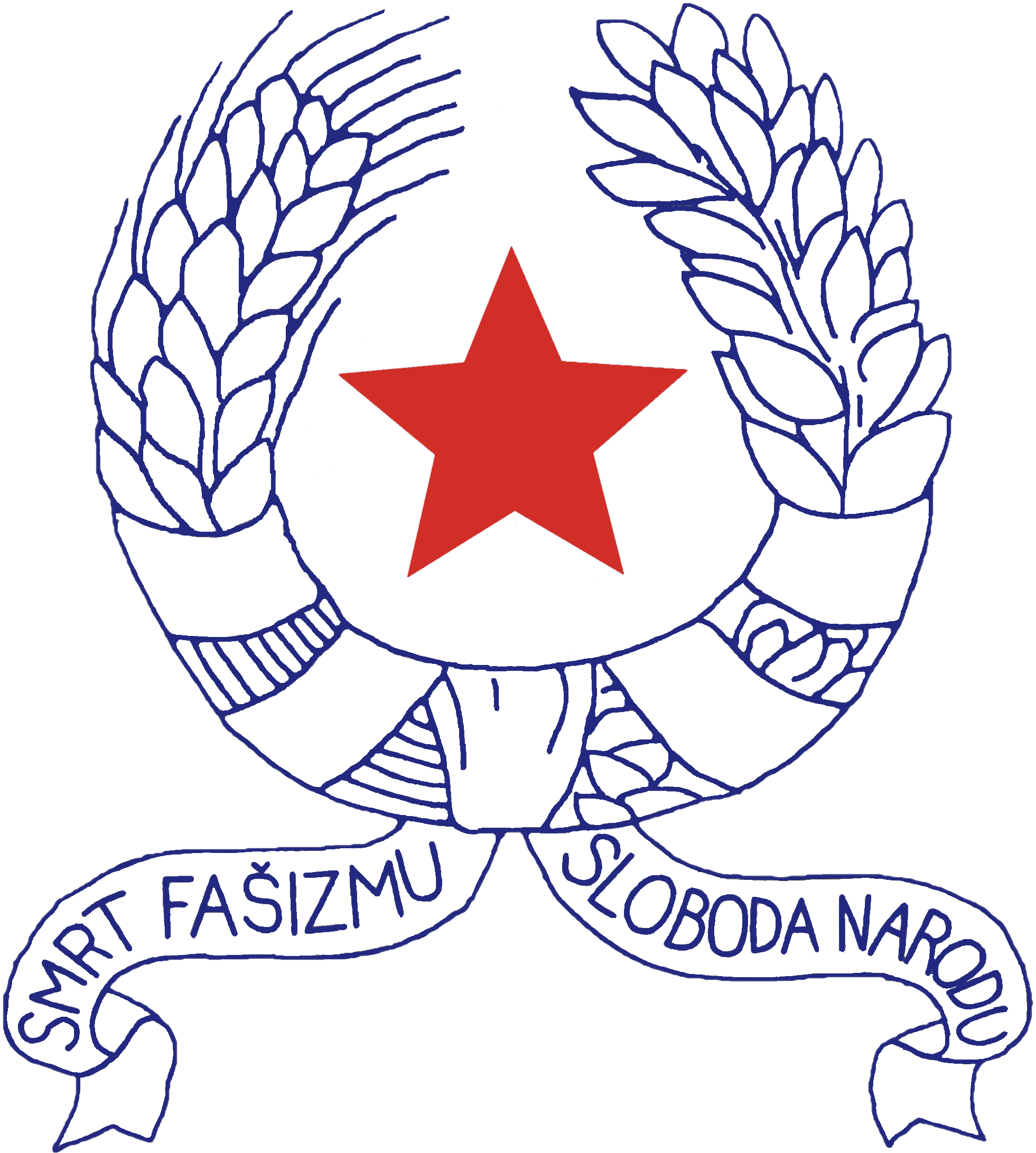
Emblem of AVNOJ during first session (1942–1943)

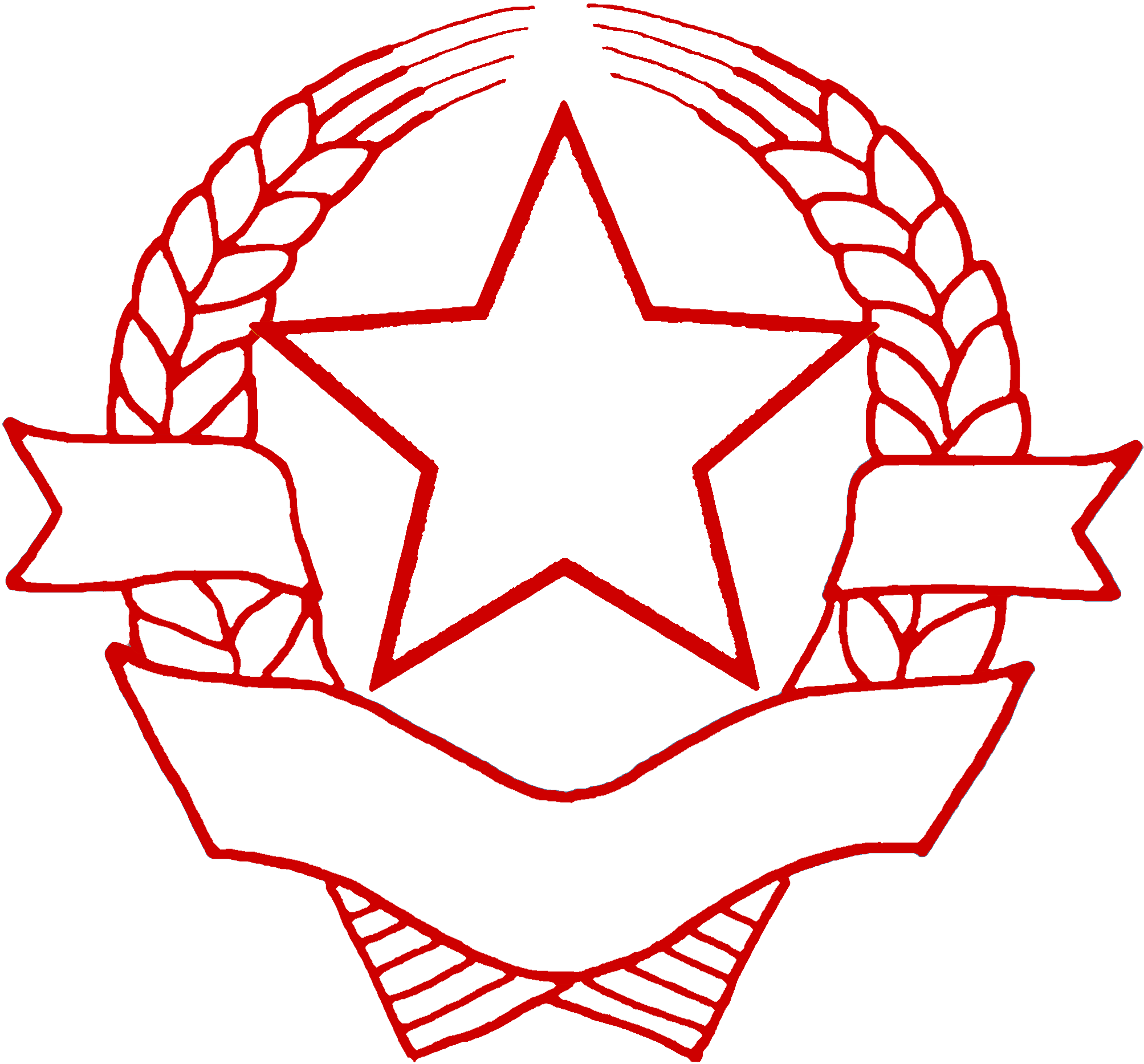
Emblem of AVNOJ during second session (1943)

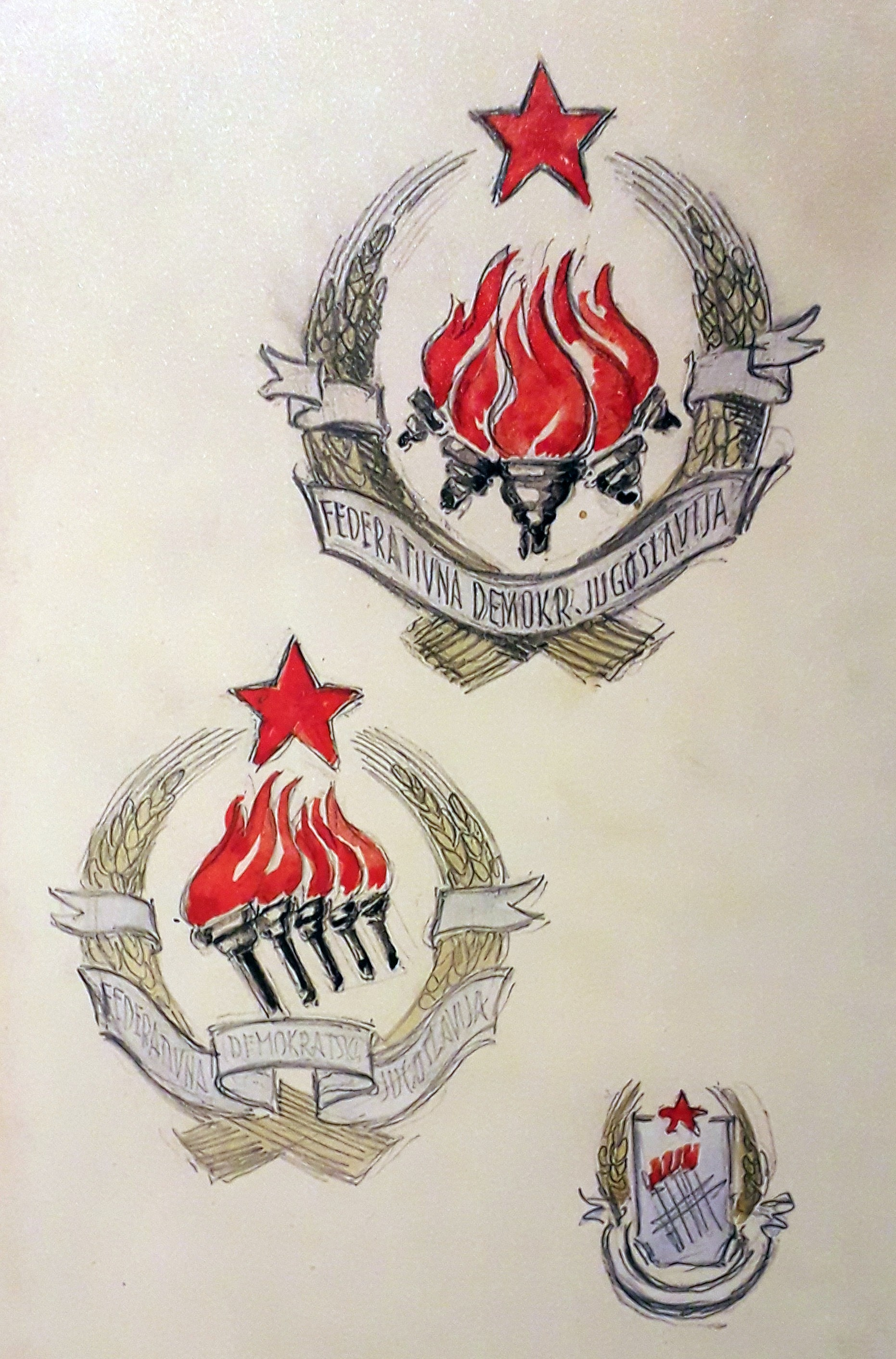
Sketches for the emblem of Yugoslavia by Đorđe Andrejević Kun (1943)

Emblem of Democratic Federal Yugoslavia (1943–1946)

Emblem of FPR Yugoslavia (1946–1963)

Emblem of SFR Yugoslavia (1963–1992)

== See also ==
- Coat of arms of Bosnia and Herzegovina
- Coat of arms of Croatia
- Coat of arms of Kosovo
- Coat of arms of Montenegro
- National emblem of North Macedonia
- Coat of arms of Serbia
- Coat of arms of Slovenia
- Emblems of the Yugoslav Socialist Republics
- Flag of Yugoslavia
- List of Yugoslav flags
- Socialist-style emblems
