= List of ambassadors of Kosovo to France =

Coordinates: 48.875486°N 2.306328°E

Ambassador of Kosovo to France
- Incumbent; Mehdi Halimi since November 23, 2021
- Inaugural holder: Muhamedin Kullashi
- Formation: October 2, 2009

The Kosovar ambassador in Paris is the official representative of the Government in Pristina to the Government of France.

== List of representatives ==
Diplomatic agrément	Diplomatic accreditation	Ambassador	Observations	Prime Minister of Kosovo	List of presidents of France	Term end
October 2, 2009	Muhamedin Kullashi			Hashim Thaçi	Nicolas Sarkozy; François Hollande	July 26, 2016
July 26, 2016	Qëndrim R. Gashi			Isa Mustafa	François Hollande; Emmanuel Macron	May 19, 2021
November 23, 2021	Mehdi Halimi			Albin Kurti	Emmanuel Macron	
