= Flag of Serbia and Montenegro =

Federal Republic of Yugoslavia State Union of Serbia and Montenegro
- National flag of Serbia and Montenegro (1992–2006)
- Use: National flag
- Proportion: 1∶2
- Adopted: 27 April 1992
- Relinquished: 3 June 2006
- Design: Three equal horizontal bands, blue (top), white, and red
- Use: Civil flag and ensign
- Proportion: 2:3
- Adopted: 27 April 1992
- Relinquished: 3 June 2006
- Design: Three equal horizontal bands, blue (top), white and red
- Use: Naval ensign
- Proportion: 2:3
- Adopted: 31 May 1993
- Relinquished: 3 June 2006
- Use: Naval jack
- Proportion: 2:3
- Adopted: 31 May 1993
- Relinquished: 3 June 2006

The national flag of Serbia and Montenegro, originally adopted as the national flag of the Federal Republic of Yugoslavia, was used from 1992 until the state's dissolution in 2006. Derived from the flag of the Socialist Federal Republic of Yugoslavia, it retained the Pan-Slavic tricolor but omitted the socialist red star. In this form, it closely resembled the flag of the Kingdom of Yugoslavia, apart from the aspect ratio.

== History ==
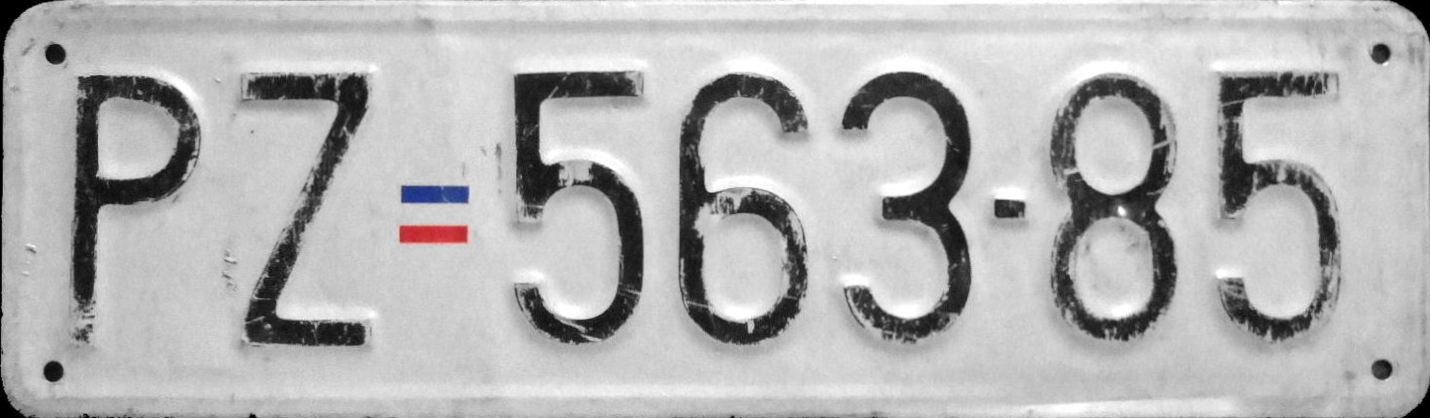
Prizren license plate from 1999, depicting the flag.

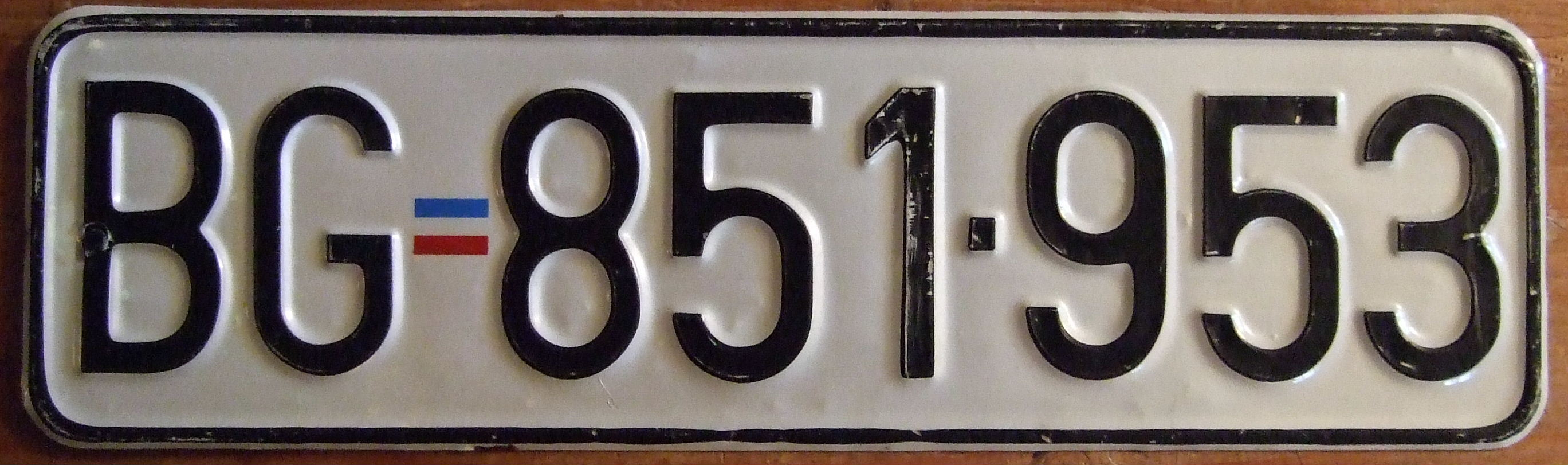
Belgrade license plate from 2006, depicting the flag. This style license plate was used until 2011, 5 years after the dissolution of Serbia and Montenegro.

Following the fall of communism and the breakup of Yugoslavia, two of the six former SFR Yugoslav republics, Serbia and Montenegro, decided to remain part of a common federation, known then as the Federal Republic of Yugoslavia. The Constitution of the Federal Republic of Yugoslavia, adopted on 27 April 1992, defined the federal flag as three horizontal stripes of blue, white and red, in that order from top to bottom. Derived from the flag of the Socialist Federal Republic of Yugoslavia, the new flag excluded the socialist red star; as such, it most closely resembled the national flag of the Kingdom of Yugoslavia, apart from the aspect ratio. This made Yugoslavia the last country in Europe to remove a red star from its flag. However, due to United Nations Security Council Resolution 777, FR Yugoslavia was not permitted to inherit SFR Yugoslavia's United Nations membership. Between 1992 and 2000, the old SFR flag continued to fly outside the United Nations Headquarters because the new government of FR Yugoslavia refused to apply for membership over their claims of sole legal state succession being rejected by the European Community, United States and other successor states of the former SFR Yugoslavia. Following a successful application to membership in the UN in 2000, the old flag was removed and replaced with the Federal Republic flag.

The decision to change the flag was controversial with socialist parties in FR Yugoslavia. When it was unveiled, Socialist Party of Serbia councilors in Tutin refused to work on the municipal council on the grounds that "the flag of another state is displayed in the offices of the Town Hall". As FR Yugoslavia came under UN sanctions due to ongoing wars, athletes from the country competed as Independent Olympic Participants at the 1992 Summer Olympics and marched under the neutral Olympic flag, instead of the Yugoslav one.

In 2003, when FR Yugoslavia was renamed as Serbia and Montenegro, there were disputes over any new symbols to be used for the state union. It was alleged that the new Constitutional Charter of Serbia and Montenegro prohibited the use of the old Yugoslav symbols until a law on them was brought before the Parliament of Serbia and Montenegro and one was required to be brought within sixty days of the new Parliament sitting. The flag remained unchanged, however, as reaching any sort of agreement between the two sides upon a logical new flag was difficult; the individual regional flags of Serbia and Montenegro differed between each other only in the shade of blue being used, while both differed in the order of colors from the Yugoslav one. As predicted, the Serbian and Montenegrin delegations were unable to agree on a new flag so they continued to use the old starless Yugoslav flag until the union's dissolution in 2006. Some Serbians and Montenegrins started to reject the flag in favour of the old flag of SFR Yugoslavia due to a sense of nostalgia and due to a feeling of abandonment from the international community. Montenegro did not support the flag continuing to be used to represent them and in 2004, the Parliament of Montenegro adopted a new flag to replace the flag of Serbia and Montenegro within their republic. However, this remained a regional flag within the union until Montenegrin independence in 2006.

During the dispute following the change of name from Yugoslavia to Serbia and Montenegro, the flag was used to represent Serbia and Montenegro in football as UEFA allowed the Serbia and Montenegro national football team to continue to use the Yugoslav flag and their Yugoslav kits whilst the decision was made. In 2006, shortly after the country's dissolution, the Serbia and Montenegro football team entered the 2006 FIFA World Cup for one last time using the flag they had qualified under. Paradoxically, the team was representing a country that no longer existed under a flag that was no longer in use, as both Montenegro and Serbia adopted their own flags upon dissolution and independence. This was also reflected on Serbian license plates, which continued to depict the old Yugoslav-era flag on them until 2011.

== Post-dissolution ==
Following Montenegro voting for independence and the union being dissolved by a unanimous vote of the Serbian deputies (as the Montenegrin deputies had boycotted it), the flag was lowered from the Parliament building in Belgrade on 5 June 2006. At the Serbian military headquarters, the flag was ceremonially lowered to "Hey, Slavs", the Serbian and Montenegrin national anthem, overseen by the Minister of Defence Zoran Stanković. Following the dissolution of Serbia and Montenegro, the two successor states adopted their own flags. Montenegro continued to use the regional flag they had adopted in 2004. Serbia adopted a new flag using the same colours of the flag of Serbia and Montenegro (with the three coloured bars in a different order) but included the coat of arms of Serbia defaced on it.

== Other flags ==
Flag	Date	Use	Description
	2003	Proposed national flag of Serbia and Montenegro	Serbian tricolour
	2004–2006	State flag of Serbia (2004–2006)	Serbian tricolour with small coat of arms on the left side
	1992–2004	State flag of Serbia	Serbian tricolour
	2004–2006	State flag of Montenegro	Red field with golden border and Montenegrin coat of arms in the center
	1993–2004	State flag of Montenegro	Serbian tricolour with sky blue
	1992–1993	State flag of Montenegro	Serbian tricolour with a yellow-bordered red star in the center
	1993–2006	Standard of the President	1:1 proportioned Yugoslav tricolour with the Serbian eagle (version used by Serbia and Montenegro) in the center and blue-red border fleury
	1995–2006	Standard of the Prime Minister	1:1 proportioned Yugoslav tricolour
	1995–2006	Standard of a Member of the High Defense Council	1:1 proportioned Yugoslav tricolour with Serbian eagle in the center (version used by Serbia and Montenegro)
	1995–2006	Standard of the Minister of Defense	1:1 proportioned Yugoslav tricolour with small emblem of the Armed Forces in the center
	1995–2006	Standard of the Chief of the General Staff	1:1 proportioned white field with Serbian eagle in the center (Serbo-Montenegrin version) plus blue and red stripes at the border

=== Rank flags ===
Flag	Date	Use	Description
	1993–2006	Flag of the Admiral of the Fleet	1:1 Yugoslav tricolour with blue and red stripes at the border plus a golden anchor in the upper left corner
	1993–2006	Flag of an admiral	1:1 proportioned white field with golden anchor in the upper left corner and blue and red stripes at the border
	1993–2006	Flag of a vice admiral	1:1 proportioned red field with blue and red stripes at the border and a golden anchor in the upper left corner
	1993–2006	Flag of a rear admiral	1:1 proportioned blue field with golden anchor in the upper left corner and blue and red stripes at the border

== See also ==
- Coat of arms of Serbia and Montenegro
- Coat of arms of Serbia
- Coat of arms of Montenegro
- Flag of Serbia
- Flag of Montenegro
- List of Serbian flags
- List of flags of Montenegro
