= Flag of Yugoslavia =

National flag from 1918 to 1992

Socialist Federal Republic of Yugoslavia
- Use: National flag
- Proportion: 1∶2
- Adopted: 31 January 1946
- Relinquished: 27 April 1992
- Design: A horizontal triband of blue, white, and red with a gold-bordered red star in the center
- Designed by: Đorđe Andrejević-Kun
- Use: Civil and state ensign
- Proportion: 2:3
- Adopted: 21 March 1950
- Design: The national flag shortened to a proportion of 2:3.
- Use: Naval ensign
- Proportion: 2:3
- Adopted: 6 June 1949

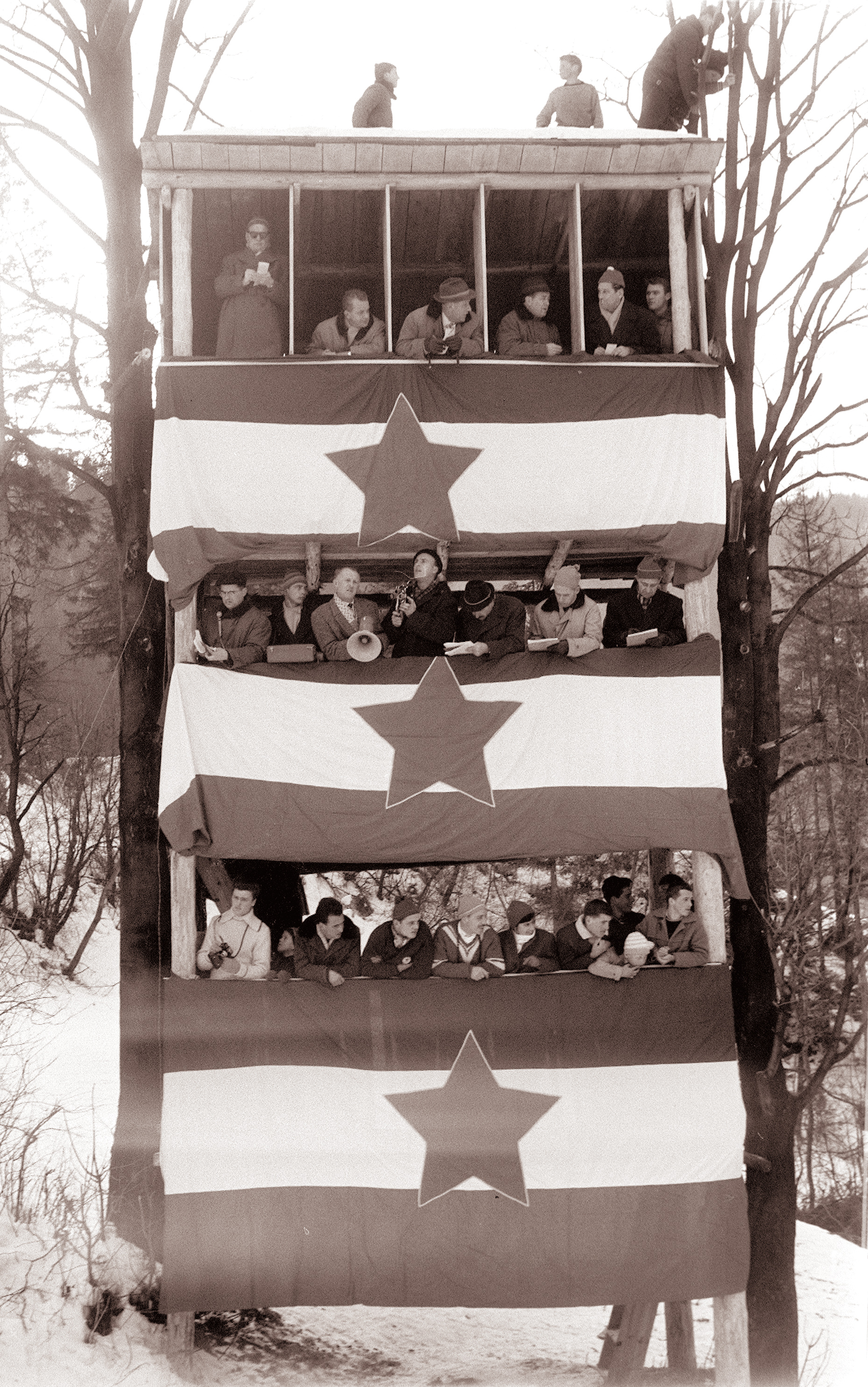
Yugoslav flags at a ski jumping contest, 1962

The flag of Yugoslavia was the official flag of the Yugoslav state from 1918 to 1992. The flag's design and symbolism are derived from the Pan-Slavic movement, which ultimately led to the unification of the South Slavs and the creation of a united south-Slavic state in 1918.

The flag had three equal horizontal bands of blue, white, and red and was first used by the Kingdom of Yugoslavia from 1918 to 1941. A red star was added in its center by the victorious Yugoslav Partisans in World War II and this design was used until the breakup of Yugoslavia in the early 1990s, whereupon the changes where reverted. This version continued to be used by the direct successor state to Yugoslavia, the Federal Republic of Yugoslavia, until its own dissolution in 2006. Today, the flag still holds meaning to those nostalgic for Yugoslavia or who admire its anti-fascist symbolism.

== Design and symbolism ==
The flag of Yugoslavia is a horizontal tricolour of blue (top), white (middle) and red (bottom). The design and colours are based on the Pan-Slavic flag adopted at the Pan-Slavic Congress of 1848, in Prague. Following the end of the First World War in 1918, the Southern Slavs united into a single unitary state of the Kingdom of Serbs, Croats and Slovenes, later known as Yugoslavia. The monarchy selected the pan-Slavic design to symbolise the new founded unity of all Southern Slavs. The design consisted of a simple horizontal tricolour with three equal bands of blue (top), white (middle) and red (bottom). Following the end of the Second World War and the abolition of the monarchy in 1945, the new Communist government retained the design of the flag but added a red star with yellow border in the centre. This flag remained in use until the dissolution of SFR Yugoslavia in 1992, after the new union of Serbia and Montenegro removed the red star and retained a plain tricolour flag until their dissolution in 2006.

Colors scheme	Blue	White	Red	Yellow
CMYK	100-61-0-42	0-0-0-0	0-100-100-12	0-17-91-1
HEX	#003893	#FFFFFF	#DE0000	#FCD115
RGB	0-56-147	255-255-255	222-0-0	252-209-21

== Constituent republics flags ==
Following World War II, Yugoslavia became a federal socialist republic, consisting of six sub-level constituent republics. Each constituent republic had its own flag and emblem. Most of the flags were based on the old historical flags of the respective Yugoslav states, except the flag of the SR Bosnia and Herzegovina and SR Macedonia which only gained statehood after World War II. SR Croatia, SR Montenegro, SR Serbia, and SR Slovenia all used the pan-Slavic colors, red, white and blue, in the particular way in which there were already traditional for in the respective countries. They were all embellished by a communist symbol, the red star. This standardization meant that SR Montenegro and SR Serbia had identical flags, as they continued the use of the tricolours of the Kingdom of Montenegro and the Kingdom of Serbia respectively. As for Bosnia and Herzegovina, because of its multiethnic character, its flag consisted of a red flag but with a small SFR Yugoslav flag in the canton. The red and yellow of the flag of SR Macedonia reflected the colours of the traditional coat of arms with a lion of the region.

Flag of Bosnia and Herzegovina	Flag of Montenegro	Flag of Croatia
Flag of Macedonia	Flag of Slovenia	Flag of Serbia

== History ==
=== Kingdom of Yugoslavia ===
Kingdom of Serbs, Croats and Slovenes (1918–1929) Kingdom of Yugoslavia (1929–1941)
- National flag of the Kingdom of Yugoslavia
- Use: National flag
- Proportion: 2:3
- Adopted: 1918
- Relinquished: 1943
- Design: A horizontal triband of blue, white and red
- Naval Ensign of the Kingdom of Yugoslavia
- Traditional flag with the coat of arms
- Use: Naval ensign
- Proportion: 2:3
- Adopted: 1922
- Relinquished: 1943
- Design: A horizontal triband of blue, white and red with a simplified coat of arms at the hoist side

The national flag of the former Kingdom of Yugoslavia was blue-white-red in the horizontal sense against a vertical staff. The national flag was the same as the historic Pan-Slavic flag approved at the Pan-Slavic Congress in Prague, 1848. The naval ensign (war flag) of the Kingdom of Yugoslavia is blue-white-red with the simplified lesser coat of arms: On one third of the ensign length there shall be the state coat of arms with the crown. The height of the arms and crown (without the globe and cross) shall be half of the ensign height.

The flags of the Kingdom were in official use from 1922 until the Kingdom of Yugoslavia was occupied by Axis powers in 1941. After that, the flag was used by the officially recognized government in exile, diplomatic representatives, and the Allies until 1945. During the Second World War, Yugoslav Army in the Fatherland (also known as Chetniks) continued to use the flag.

The Kingdom of Serbs, Croats and Slovenes was established on December 1, 1918 and was renamed the Kingdom of Yugoslavia on October 3, 1929. The state's first flag was officially adopted in 1922. All Yugoslav flags (including the first ones) were variations on the Pan-Slavic flag adopted at the Pan-Slavic Congress in Prague in 1848. The Pan-Slavic flag was a plain blue-white-red tricolor in the horizontal sense against a vertical staff, and the national flag and civil and state ensign during the 1918–1943 period (Kingdom of Yugoslavia) was exactly the same. The naval ensign during the period was the blue-white-red tricolor with the simplified lesser coat of arms of Yugoslavia.

The Corfu Declaration mentions that individual Serbian, Croatian and Slovenian national flags and coats of arms are equal and can be displayed and used freely on all occasions.

==== Banovina of Croatia ====
In response to demands by Croat politicians for autonomy of Croatia, an autonomous region of Croatia was created within the Kingdom of Yugoslavia, the Banovina of Croatia. It used the Croatian red-white-blue tricolour for its civil flag, and its state flag included the tricolour charged with the Croatian šahovnica.

Civil flag of the Banovina of Croatia.

State flag of the Banovina of Croatia.

=== World War II ===
The flag of the Democratic Federal Yugoslavia during World War II (1943–1946)

In 1941 during World War II Yugoslavia was invaded and occupied by the Axis powers, and the Yugoslav government fled into exile in London. Soon afterward, the Yugoslav resistance, the Partisans, was formed. The Partisans did not support the Yugoslav government-in-exile and initially used a number of different flags until finally one was universally adopted. The new flag was the Yugoslav blue-white-red tricolor with a red star occupying the center of the white field, and with the dimensions altered to 1:2 instead of 2:3. The Partisans were recognized by the Allies in late November 1943 (Tehran Conference) and the name of the Yugoslav state was altered to Democratic Federal Yugoslavia (DFY). The old flag continued to be used by the government-in-exile (up until its merge with the Partisan government, the NKOJ in 1944), by its diplomatic representatives, and by the western Allies until 1945 - while in Yugoslavia, the version with the red star was primarily in use.

=== Socialist Yugoslavia ===
After the war, in 1945, the red star flag became universally official. It was given its final shape by enlarging the star and adding a narrow yellow border. The flag was usually accompanied on official buildings by the flag of the federal republic and the flag of the League of Communists of Yugoslavia. Because of this, many buildings in former Yugoslavia still carry a three-poled flag holder. A smaller version of the flag served as the civil ensign while an elongated banner version was seen flown in front of the Yugoslav parliament.

==== Construction details ====
Chapter 1, Article 4 of the 1946 Yugoslav Constitution laid out the specifications for the SFRY flag. The ratio was set at 1:2 and it consisted of a flag that has blue, white and red horizontal stripes that are of equal width. In the middle of the flag is a red star that has a border of golden-yellow. The red star is placed in the center of the flag where the intersections of the corners meet. In the 1963 and 1974 constitutions, the specifications and design of the flag did not change. Other sources state that the red star is placed in a circle that has a diameter of 2/3 of the flag's hoist (width). The size of the golden-yellow border was not defined in the 1946 Constitution.

=== Post-breakup usage ===
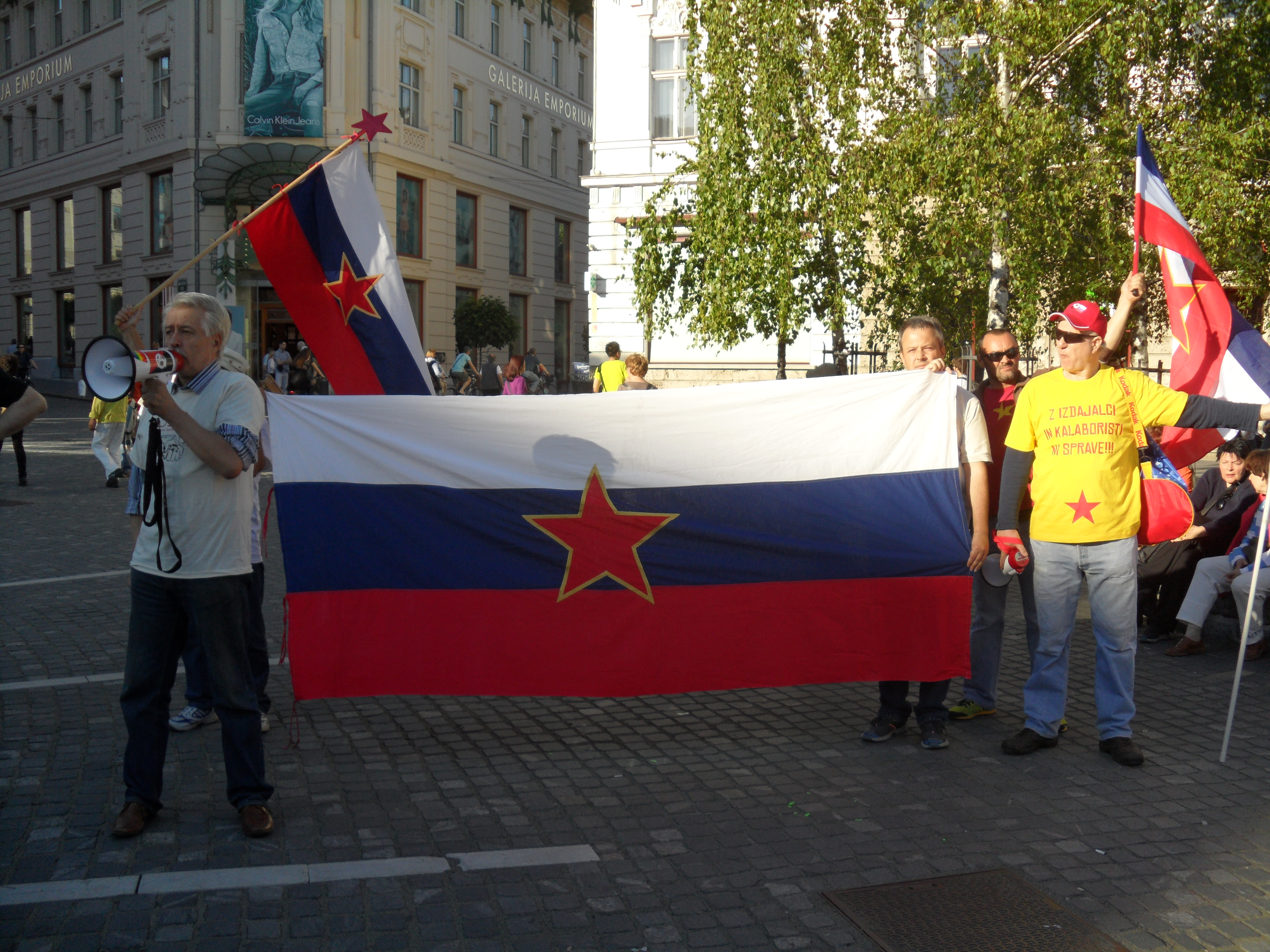
Yugoslav-Slovenian flags at an anti-fascist march in Ljubljana, Slovenia, 2014

Flags of the former SFR Yugoslavia and its republics continue to be flown at anti-fascist protests, International Workers' Day celebrations, Yugo-nostalgic gatherings and pride parades throughout Yugosphere and among its diaspora. Yugoslav flags and symbolism are not an unusual sighting in neighbouring Italy either.

== See also ==
- Emblem of Yugoslavia
- List of Yugoslav flags
- Flag of Bosnia and Herzegovina
- Flag of Croatia
- Flag of Kosovo
- Flag of North Macedonia
- Flag of Montenegro
- Flag of Serbia and Montenegro
- Flag of Serbia
- Flag of Slovenia
- List of flag bearers for Yugoslavia at the Olympics
