= List of Yugoslav flags =

This is a list of flags that were used by and in Yugoslavia.

== National and civil flags ==
Flag	Date	Use	Description
	1918–1941	National flag, civil and state ensign	Three equal horizontal bands in the pan-Slavic colors, blue (top), white, and red.
	1943–1946	National flag, civil and state ensign	Three equal horizontal bands in the pan-Slavic colors, blue (top), white, and red, with a red star in the central white band.
	1946–1992	National flag	Three equal horizontal bands in the pan-Slavic colors, blue (top), white, and red, with a yellow-bordered red star at the flag's center.
	1950–1992	Civil and state ensign	Three equal horizontal bands in the pan-Slavic colors, blue (top), white, and red, with a yellow-bordered red star at the flag's center.
	1992–2006	National flag	Three equal horizontal bands in the pan-Slavic colors, blue (top), white, and red.

=== Proposed flags ===
Flag	Date	Use	Description
	1963	National flag	Red flag with a state coat of arms in the center. Identical to the Naval jack except in aspect ratio.

== Military flags ==
=== Army flags ===
Flag	Date	Use	Description
	1918–1941	War flag of the Royal Yugoslav Army	The inscription reads "With faith in God, for King and Fatherland".
	1918–1941	War flag of the Royal Yugoslav Army (in Latin script)	The inscription reads "With faith in God, for King and Fatherland".
	1941–1945	War flag of the Royal Yugoslav Army (Yugoslav Army in the Fatherland, or Chetniks)	The inscription reads "For King and Fatherland, freedom or death".
	1943–1945	Flag of the Yugoslav Partisans	
	1943–1945	Flag of the First Macedonian Brigade	The inscription reads "First Macedonian Brigade".
	1943–1945	Flag of the Liberation Front	
	1943–1945	Flag of the Triglav Unit	The inscription reads "Defence Troop Triglav".
	1945–1992	War flag of the Yugoslav Ground Forces (in Cyrillic script)	The inscription reads "For freedom and independence of the socialist fatherland".
	1945–1992	War flag of the Yugoslav Ground Forces (in Latin script)	The inscription reads "For freedom and independence of the socialist fatherland".
	1969–1992	Flag of Territorial Defence forces	

=== Air force flags ===
Flag	Date	Use	Description
	1945–1992	Air force flag of the Yugoslav Air Force (obverse)	The inscription reads "Aviation Regiment JNA".
	1945–1992	War flag of the Yugoslav Air Force (reverse)	The inscription reads "For freedom and independence of the socialist fatherland".

=== Naval ensigns ===
Flag	Date	Use	Description
	1918–1922	Naval Ensign of Yugoslavia	
	1922–1944	Naval Ensign of Yugoslavia	
	1944–1945	Naval Ensign of Yugoslavia (Government-in-exile)	Three equal horizontal bands in the pan-Slavic colors, blue (top), white and red.
	1942–1943	Naval Ensign of Yugoslavia	
	1943–1949	Naval Ensign of Yugoslavia	
	1949–1992	Naval Ensign of Yugoslavia	
	1992–2006	Naval Ensign of Yugoslavia	

=== Naval jacks ===
Flag	Date	Use	Description
	1956–1963	Naval Jack of Yugoslavia	
	1963–1992	Naval Jack of Yugoslavia	
	1992–2006	Naval Jack of Yugoslavia	

=== Defence Ministry Flags ===
Flag	Date	Use	Description
	1963–1993	Standard of the Federal Secretary of People's Defence of the SFR Yugoslavia	
	1956–1963	Standard of the Federal Secretary of People's Defence of the SFR Yugoslavia	
	1944–1945	Standard of the Minister of the Army and Navy of the Kingdom of Yugoslavia	
	1937–1944	Standard of the Minister of the Army and Navy of the Kingdom of Yugoslavia	
	1918–1937	Standard of the Minister of Defence of the Kingdom of Yugoslavia	
	1995–2006	Standard of a Member of the High Defense Council	1:1 proportioned Yugoslav tricolour with Serbian eagle in the center (version used by Serbia and Montenegro)
	1995–2006	Standard of the Chief of the General Staff	1:1 proportioned white field with Serbian eagle in the center (Serbo-Montenegrin version) plus blue and red stripes at the border
	1995–2006	Standard of the Minister of Defense	1:1 proportioned Yugoslav tricolour with small emblem of the Armed Forces in the center

=== Rank flags ===
Flag	Date	Use	Description
	1929–1941	Standard of a Field marshal (Vojvoda) of Yugoslavia	
	1929–1941	Standard of an Army general of Yugoslavia	
	1929–1941	Standard of a Divisional general of Yugoslavia	
	1929–1941	Standard of a Brigadier general of Yugoslavia	
	1918–1941	Admiral flag	
	1918–1941	Vice Admiral flag	
	1918–1941	Rear Admiral flag	
	1956–1991	Fleet Admiral flag	
	1956–1991	Admiral flag	
	1956–1991	Vice Admiral flag	
	1956–1991	Rear Admiral flag	
	1949–1956	Flag of the Commander and Political Commissar of the Navy	
	1949–1956	Flag of the Commander and Political Commissar of a Fleet	
	1949–1956	Flag of the Commander and Political Commissar of a Brigade	

== Government flags ==
=== Governmental ===
Flag	Date	Use	Description
	1992–2003	Presidential standard	
	1963–1992	Presidential standard	
	1956–1963	Presidential standard	
	1949–1956	Naval flag of the commander-in-chief	
	1981–1992	Standard of a member of the presidency	
	1937–1945	Standard of the prime minister	
	1995–2006	Standard of the prime minister	1:1 proportioned Yugoslav tricolour
	1981–1992	Standard of the prime minister	
	1963–1992	Standard of the president of the Federal Assembly	
	1920–1952	Flag of the Communist Party of Yugoslavia (Cyrillic script)	
	1920–1952	Flag of the Communist Party of Yugoslavia (Latin script)	
	1952–1990	Flag of the League of Communists (Cyrillic script)	
	1952–1990	Flag of the League of Communists (Latin script)	
	1952–1990	Flag of the League of Communists of Croatia	
	1952–1990	Flag of the League of Communists of Slovenia	
	1952–1990	Flag of the League of Communists of Macedonia	
	1952–1990	Flag of the League of Communists of Kosovo	
	1952–1990	Flag of the League of Communists of Vojvodina	
	1974–1990	Flag of the League of Socialist Youth	

=== Monarchical ===
Flag	Date	Use	Description
	1922–1937	Royal Standard of the King	
	1937–1941	Royal Standard of the King	
	1937–1941	Standard of the Queen	
	1937–1941	Standard of the Prince Regent	
	1937–1941	Standard of the Crown Prince	
	1937–1941	Standard of a Member of the Royal House	
	1937–1941	Standard of the Regent	

== Republic flags ==
=== Socialist Republic of Bosnia and Herzegovina ===
Flag	Date	Use	Description
	1946–1991	National flag, civil and state ensign of Bosnia and Herzegovina	
	1944–1946	National flag, civil and state ensign of Bosnia and Herzegovina	

==== Proposed flags ====
Flag	Date	Use	Description
	1947	National flag, civil and state ensign of Bosnia and Herzegovina	Variant of the flag adopted on 31 December 1946 with a much larger Yugoslav canton flag and a margin.
	15 November 1946	National flag, civil and state ensign of Bosnia and Herzegovina	Federal flag of Yugoslavia with an additional five-pointed golden star imposed behind the existing red star, with their rays interchangeably positioned.

=== Socialist Republic of Croatia ===
Flag	Date	Use	Description
	1990–present	National flag, civil and state ensign of Croatia	
	1990	National flag, civil and state ensign of Croatia	
	1947–1990	National flag, civil and state ensign of Croatia	
	1945–1947	National flag, civil and state ensign of Croatia	

=== Socialist Republic of Macedonia ===
Flag	Date	Use	Description
	1946–1992	National flag, civil and state ensign of Macedonia	
	1944–1946	National flag, civil and state ensign of Macedonia	

=== Socialist Republic of Montenegro ===
Flag	Date	Use	Description
	2004–2006	National flag, civil and state ensign of Montenegro	
	1993–2004	National flag, civil and state ensign of Montenegro	
	1946–1993	National flag, civil and state ensign of Montenegro	
	1943–1946	National flag, civil and state ensign of Montenegro	

=== Socialist Republic of Serbia ===
Flag	Date	Use	Description
	2004–2006	National flag, civil and state ensign of Serbia	
	1992–2004	National flag, civil and state ensign of Serbia	
	1947–1992	National flag, civil and state ensign of Serbia	
	1943–1947	National flag, civil and state ensign of Serbia	

=== Socialist Republic of Slovenia ===
Flag	Date	Use	Description
	1991	National flag, civil and state ensign of Slovenia	
	1947–1991	National flag, civil and state ensign of Slovenia	
	1943–1947	National flag, civil and state ensign of Slovenia	

== Banate flags ==
Flag	Date	Use	Description
	1939–1941	Civil flag and ensign of the Banovina of Croatia	
	1939–1941	State flag and ensign of the Banovina of Croatia	

== Ethnic communities ==
Although the Socialist Autonomous Province of Kosovo had no official flag, from 1969 the Kosovar Albanian population was able to use a variant of the Albanian flag as its ethnic flag. As of 1985 a similar right applied to all national minorities, provided the flag was charged with the Yugoslav red star.

Flag	Use	Description
	Flag of the Albanian minority in SFR Yugoslavia	
	Flag of the Bulgarian minority in SFR Yugoslavia	
	Flag of the Czech minority in SFR Yugoslavia	
	Flag of the German minority in SFR Yugoslavia	
	Flag of the Hungarian minority in SFR Yugoslavia	
	Flag of the Italian minority in SFR Yugoslavia	
	Flag of the Polish minority in SFR Yugoslavia	
	Flag of the Romani minority in SFR Yugoslavia	
	Flag of the Romanian minority in SFR Yugoslavia	
	Flag of the Ruthenian and Ukrainian minorities in SFR Yugoslavia	
	Flag of the Slovak and Russian minorities in SFR Yugoslavia	
	Flag of the Turkish minority in SFR Yugoslavia	
