= Flags of the regions of France =

Overview of French regional flags

The galleries below show flags of France attributed to the metropolitan regions, former regions, departments, overseas regions, collectivities and subdivisions.

The official status of many regional and territorial flags in France is often unclear. Since the late 20th centuries, many regional and local authorities have adopted logos as their primary emblems, which are subsequently displayed on logo flags. Such flags often serve as de facto institutional symbols but usually lack formal heraldic or vexillological recognition.

Alongside these are numerous traditional regional flags, whose status also varies. Some historical flags date back centuries, while others are banners of arms or more recent designs created by private individuals or associations. In some cases, these flags have later gained semi-official or customary use through adoption by public institutions, commemorative coinage, public transport, or municipal buildings.

== Metropolitan regions ==
| Region | Flags in use | | Proposed or alternative flags |
| Region | Traditional flag | Logo flag | Proposed or alternative flags |
|---|---|---|---|
| Auvergne-Rhône-Alpes | | | |
| Bourgogne-Franche-Comté | | | |
| Brittany | | (Note: Variants of the regional council logo-flags exist.) | (Note: The banner of arms of Brittany, flag of the Duchy of Brittany and the province of Brittany (1532)) |
| Centre-Val de Loire | | | |
| Corsica | | | |
| Grand Est | | | |
| Hauts-de-France | | | |
| Île-de-France | | | |
| Normandy | | | |
| Nouvelle-Aquitaine | (Note: Registered at the French Society of Vexillology.) | | |
| Occitanie | | | (Note: The still popular flag of the historical region Occitania with the Occitan cross, later adopted by Midi-Pyrénées and Languedoc-Roussillon.) |
| Pays de la Loire | | | |
| Provence-Alpes-Côte d'Azur | | | |

== Former regions ==
| Region | Traditional flag | Logo flag | Region | Traditional flag | Logo flag | Region | Traditional flag | Logo flag |
|---|---|---|---|---|---|---|---|---|
| Auvergne | | | Champagne-Ardenne | | | Limousin | | |
| Rhône-Alpes | | | Lorraine | | | Poitou-Charentes | | |
| Bourgogne | | | Nord-Pas-de-Calais | | | Languedoc-Roussillon | | |
| Franche Comte | | | Picardy | | | Midi-Pyrénées | | |
| Brittany | | | Île-de-France | | | Pays de la Loire | | |
| Centre-Val de Loire | | | Basse-Normandy | | | Provence-Alpes-Côte d'Azur | | |
| Corsica | | | Haute-Normandie | | | | | |
| Alsace | | | Aquitaine | | | | | |

== French Departments ==
| Name | Official Flag | Proposed Flag (Banner of Arms) | Name | Official Flag | Proposed Flag (Banner of Arms) | Name | Official Flag | Proposed Flag (Banner of Arms) | Name | Official Flag | Proposed Flag (Banner of Arms) |
|---|---|---|---|---|---|---|---|---|---|---|---|
| Ain | | | Doubs | | | Manche | | | Haute-Savoie | | |
| Aisne | | | Drôme | | | Marne | | | Paris | | |
| Allier | | | Eure | | | Haute-Marne | | | Seine-Maritime | (Note: Variants of the departmental council logo-flags exist.) | |
| Alpes-de-Haute-Provence | | | Eure-et-Loir | | | Mayenne | | | Seine-et-Marne | | |
| Hautes-Alpes | | | Finistère | | | Meurthe-et-Moselle | | | Yvelines | | |
| Alpes-Maritimes | | | Gard | | | Meuse | | | Deux-Sèvres | | |
| Ardèche | | | Haute-Garonne | | | Morbihan | | | Somme | | |
| Ardennes | | | Gers | | | Moselle | | | Tarn | | |
| Ariège | | | Gironde | | | Nièvre | | | Tarn-et-Garonne | | |
| Aube | | | Hérault | | | Nord | | | Var | | |
| Aude | | | Ille-et-Vilaine | | | Oise | | | Vaucluse | | |
| Aveyron | | | Indre | | | Orne | | | Vendée | | |
| Bouches-du-Rhône | | | Indre-et-Loire | | | Pas-de-Calais | | | Vienne | | |
| Calvados | | | Isère | | | Puy-de-Dôme | | | Haute-Vienne | | |
| Cantal | | | Jura | | | Pyrénées-Atlantiques | | | Vosges | | (Note: Banner of arms for this department is used co-officially with the departmental council logo-flag.) |
| Charente | | | Landes | | | Hautes-Pyrénées | | | Yonne | | |
| Charente-Maritime | | | Loir-et-Cher | | | Pyrénées-Orientales | | | Territoire de Belfort | | |
| Cher | | | Loire | | | Bas-Rhin | | | Essonne | | |
| Corrèze | | | Haute-Loire | | | Haut-Rhin | | | Hauts-de-Seine | | |
| Haute-Corse | | | Loire-Atlantique | | | Rhône | | | Seine-Saint-Denis | | |
| Corse-du-Sud | | | Loiret | | | Grand Lyon | | | Val-de-Marne | | |
| Côte-d'Or | | | Lot | | | Haute-Saône | | | Val-d'Oise | | |
| Côtes-d'Armor | | | Lot-et-Garonne | | | Saône-et-Loire | | | | | |
| Creuse | | | Lozère | | | Sarthe | | | | | |
| Dordogne | | | Maine-et-Loire | | | Savoie | | | | | |

== Overseas regions and collectivities ==
Flags of Overseas France
| Territory | Official or co-official flag (Note: Official or co-official flag other than the French national flag.) | Government flag (Note: Flag used by the local government.) | Local flag (Note: Flag usually flown by the peoples of the territory.) | Traditional flag (Note: Flag traditionally associated with the territory, either by being a former flag, or a flag used by locals in the past.) |
|---|---|---|---|---|
| French Guiana | | | | |
| French Polynesia | | | | |
| French Southern and Antarctic Lands | | | | |
| Guadeloupe | | | | |
| Martinique | | | | |
| Mayotte | | | | |
| New Caledonia | | | | |
| Réunion | | | | |
| Saint Barthélemy | | | | |
| Saint Martin (Note: Saint Martin doesn't have a co-official or an unofficial flag, so the flag of France is used.) | | | | |
| Saint Pierre and Miquelon | | | | |
| Wallis and Futuna | | | | |

== Subdivisions of overseas collectivities ==
French Polynesia

Flag of the Austral Islands

Flag of the Gambier Islands

Flag of the Marquesas Islands

Flag of the Society Islands

Flag of the Tuamotu Islands
New Caledonia

Flag of Loyalty Islands Province

Flag of the North Province

Flag of the South Province
Saint Pierre and Miquelon

Flag of Miquelon-Langlade

Flag of Saint-Pierre
Wallis and Futuna

Flag of Alo

Flag of Sigavé

Flag of ʻUvea
