= Muhamedin Kullashi =

Albanian ambassador of the Republic of Kosovo

Kosovar Ambassador to France
- In office October 2, 2009 – July 26, 2016
- Succeeded by: Qëndrim R. Gashi

Personal details
- Born: November 29, 1949 (age 76)

Muhamedin Kullashi Muhamedin Kulashi, born November 29, 1949) is an Albanian philosopher and Professor in a University of Paris-VIII (Université de Paris-VIII) and politician. From October 2, 2009 to July 26, 2016 he was the Republic of Kosovo's first ambassador to France.
