= Pan-Slavic colors =

Color combination of Slavic nations

The three pan-Slavic colors approved at the 1848 Slavic Congress in Prague as adopted on the flag of Yugoslavia

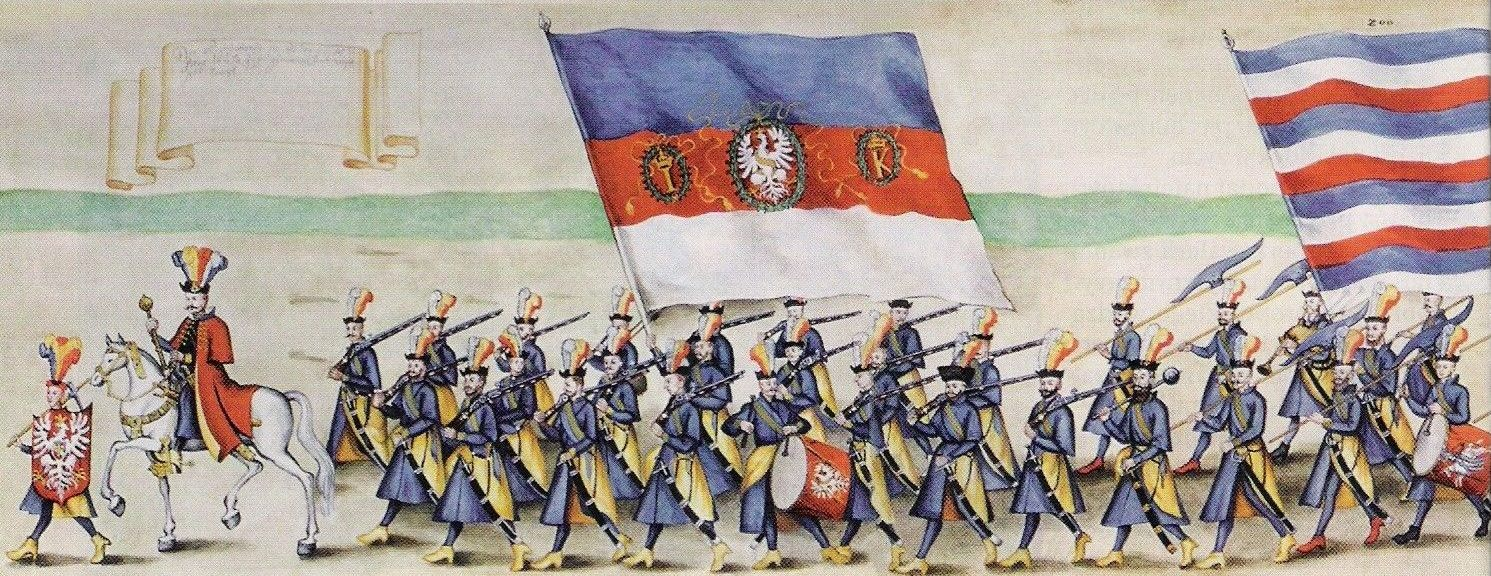
Illustration of the wedding procession of Sigismund III Vasa in Kraków from the Stockholm Scroll (c. 1605).

The inspiration of the pan-Slavic colors in 1848

Russian tricolor of Peter the Great from 1693

Pan-Slavic flag from 1848

The pan-Slavic colors—blue, white and red—were defined by the Prague Slavic Congress, 1848, based on the symbolism of the colors of the flag of Russia, which was introduced in the late 17th century. Historically, however, many Slavic nations and states had already adopted flags and other national symbols that used some combination of those three colors. Slavic countries that use or have used the colors include Russia, Yugoslavia, Czechoslovakia, the Czech Republic, Slovakia, Croatia, Serbia and Slovenia, whereas Belarus, Bosnia and Herzegovina, Bulgaria, Montenegro, North Macedonia, Poland (Note: The flag of Poland is red and white, but has different roots that pre-date the pan-Slavic colors.) and Ukraine use different color schemes.

Yugoslavia, both the Kingdom (Kingdom of Yugoslavia, 1918–1943) and the Republic (SFR Yugoslavia, 1943–1992) was a union of several Slavic nations, and therefore not only sported the pan-Slavic colors but adopted the pan-Slavic flag as its own (later adding a red star). After the initial breakup of Yugoslavia in the early 1990s, the two remaining Yugoslav republics—Montenegro and Serbia—reconstituted as Federal Republic of Yugoslavia in 1992 and as State Union of Serbia and Montenegro in 2003, and continued to use the pan-Slavic flag until its own dissolution when Montenegro proclaimed independence in 2006. Serbia continues to use a flag with all three Pan-Slavic colors, along with fellow republics Croatia and Slovenia.

Most flags with pan-Slavic colors have been introduced and recognized by Slavic nations following the first Slavic Congress of 1848, although Serbia adopted its red-blue-white tricolor in 1835 and the ethnic flag of Sorbs (blue-red-white) had already been designed in 1842. The flag of Slovene nation (white-blue-red), which was based on the flag of Carniola, was introduced two months prior to the congress. Czech Moravians proclaimed their flag (white-red-blue) at the very congress. In 1848, Croatian viceroy Josip Jelačić first designed the flag of Croatia with its modern tricolor (red-white-blue) for the then-concepted Triune Kingdom (and officially adopted by the Kingdom of Croatia), a group of Slovenian intellectuals in Vienna, Austria created the flag of Slovenia (white-blue-red), and the first Slovak flag (in reverse layout – red-blue-white) was introduced and flown by Slovak revolutionaries. The flag of the Czech Republic adopted its three national colors in 1920 with the founding of Czechoslovakia.

== Flags with Pan-Slavic colors ==
=== Current national flags ===
Croatia

Czech Republic, formerly Czechoslovakia (1918–1993)

Russia

Serbia

Slovakia

Slovenia

=== Former national flags with the Pan-Slavic colors ===
Flag of Kingdom of Montenegro
(1910–1916)

Kingdom of Serbia
(1882–1918)

Kingdom of Yugoslavia
(1918–1941)

Flag of the Independent State of Croatia (1941–1945)

Socialist Federal Republic of Yugoslavia (1945–1992)

Russia
(1991–1993)

Serbia and Montenegro
(1992–2006)

Autonomous Slovak land within the Second Czechoslovak Republic
(1938–1939)
First Slovak Republic
(1939–1945)
Slovak Socialist Republic within Czechoslovak Socialist Republic
(1969–1990)
Slovak Republic within Czech and Slovak Federative Republic
(1990–1992)

Montenegro (1994 proposal, never implemented)

=== Other entities ===
Serbian Krajina

Republika Srpska

The Polish National Government during the January Uprising

Transnistria (Pridnestrovie) (co-official flag) (Note: Although the majority of the population of Transnistria is Slavic (Russian and Ukrainian), the largest single ethnic group are the Romanians.)

Traditional flag Vojvodina

Flag of Vojvodina

The Sorbs

The Rusyns

Crimea

The Croatian Republic of Herzeg-Bosnia

The Protectorate of Bohemia and Moravia

The Kingdom of Slavonia

The Kingdom of Croatia-Slavonia

== See also ==
- Nordic Cross flag
- Pan-Arab colors
- Pan-African colors
- Pan-nationalism
- Pan-Slavism
- List of flags with blue, red, and white stripes
