= Coat of arms of Montenegro =

National coat of arms

- Armiger: Montenegro
- Adopted: 12 July 2004
- Designer: Radoslav Rotković

The coat of arms of Montenegro (Montenegrin: грб Црне Горе, romanized: grb Crne Gore) was officially adopted by the law passed in the Parliament on 12 July 2004. It is now the central motif of the flag of Montenegro, as well as the coat of arms of the Armed Forces of Montenegro. The coat of arms of Montenegro was designed by the Montenegrin artist Radoslav Rotković in 2004 and then constitutionally sanctioned by the Constitution proclaimed on 2 October 2007.

== Description ==
The National Symbols and Statehood Day of Montenegro Law contains the official blazon of the current arms:

The coat of arms of Montenegro consists of a golden crowned double-headed eagle, raising his wings in flight, with a scepter in the right and a globus cruciger in the left talon, on red. On the chest of the eagle lays a shield with a golden lion passant. The lion is on a green field with a blue background. The crown above the eagle's heads and the scepter are golden with a cross pattée on top. The globus cruciger is blue with golden waist and cross pattée.

The charge is a two-headed eagle, a symbol of Byzantine and ultimately ancient Roman origin. It symbolizes either the unity of or the close connections between the church and the state.

The motif was used by medieval rulers of Zeta—the House of Crnojević—as well as various other European dynasties.

The current layout of the coat of arms of Montenegro was taken from that of the Russian Empire, with which the ruling House of Petrović-Njegoš had close ecclesiastical, dynastic and political ties in the 19th century when the new coat of arms was first adopted in its present form.

The lion passant on the inescutcheon is as a sign of episcopal authority and could have been conceived of as a metaphor for the Lion of Judah. Furthermore, it bears some similarity to the motif present in the arms of Venice, which had considerable influence in the history of Montenegro. After Montenegro regained its independence from Ottoman Empire, it gradually became a theocracy to have a united front against the numerous Turkish invasions of the country. For this reason, the authority of the church was reflected in various insignia of the age.

After the establishment of the secular dynastic succession in 1851, the lion was placed beneath the eagle, while the initials of the ruler stood on the shield: notably, that of Danilo I, Prince of Montenegro, Danilo II, Prince of Montenegro and King Nicholas I of Montenegro. Curiously, Danilo I was still a prince-bishop while the standard bearing his initials was used.

The modern coat of arms placed the lion d’or back on the shield, erasing that monarchic symbol. Today, Montenegro is a secular, democratic republic, so the fact that the crown of the Petrović-Njegoš dynasty was also represented created some controversy at the time of its adoption. However, this configuration proved extremely popular. The coat of arms can be seen not only in public places such as schools and governmental offices, but also in many private houses, places of business and private universities, due to being a common display of national pride.

Despite the mention of the red background, the coat of arms is almost always used without it, with the eagle appearing as a supporter. The coat of arms appears on a red background on the national seal and the national flag.

== Use of national symbols under Montenegrin law ==
The coat of arms and the flag are used in the shape and contents determined by law. The use of the coat of arms and the flag is free in artistic creativity and educational work, in manners not disturbing the public morale, reputation and dignity of Montenegro.

In the coat of arms and the flag, it is not permitted to correct, add or change anything. Exceptionally, if so determined by special regulations, the coat of arms and the flag could be used as a component of other emblems or signs of the state bodies and other institutions. The coat of arms and the flag can not be used as merchant or service seal, sample or model, nor as any other sign marking the merchandise and services.

The coat of arms and the flag cannot be used if they are defective or otherwise inappropriate for use due to the unsuitable appearance. A defective or unsuitable for use coat of arms or flag are revoked from use.

When displayed in Montenegro together with one or more coats of arms of other states or international organizations, the coat of arms takes the place of honour. The place of honour is considered the central place in a circle, the top of the semicircle, the first place in a row, column or group of coats of arms, the place on the right, as seen from the front, from the coat of arms of another state or international organization. On scripts it takes place on the top center or upper left angle.

=== The coat of arms is used ===
1. In the state seal;
2. In the seals of other state bodies and local self-management bodies;
3. In the official halls of the state bodies and the local self-management bodies and on official inscriptions on the buildings in which these are located;
4. In rooms of educational institutions in which the educational process is performed and on inscriptions on buildings in which these institutions are located
5. On buildings of the representations of Montenegro abroad;
6. On official acts used by the representatives of the state bodies;
7. On charters, diplomas and recognitions granted by Montenegro;
8. On diplomas and attestations on finished education;
9. On identity cards of members of the parliament, members of the government, judges, inspectors and other officials.

=== The coat of arms may be used ===
1. During political, scientific, cultural, artistic, sporting and other manifestations in which Montenegro is represented;
2. On official acknowledgments, greeting cards, invitations and other acts of the President of Montenegro, the Chairman of the Parliament, the Prime Minister, the Chairman of the High Court, the Chairman of the Constitutional Court, the Supreme State Attorney and the Human Rights Ombudsman;
3. On official uniforms;
4. In artistic creations and in educational work;
5. In other cases defined by the law.

== Historical coats of arms ==
The history of the state coat of arms begins with the Crnojević dynasty in the 15th century. Their family arms – a golden crowned two-headed eagle on a red background – laid the foundation of the Montenegrin state heraldry: the two-headed eagle became the standard symbol of the state. After gaining power, the Petrović-Njegoš dynasty took the golden two-headed eagle as the state symbol. Vladika Danilo charged on its breast the Great Arms of the Petrović-Njegoš family (shield, crown, mantling), while his successor vladika Sava made major changes to the coat of arms: he removed the family Great Arms from the eagle's breast, and added a sceptre and a globus cruciger ("the imperial orb") in its claws. He also added another symbol retained until present day – a golden lion passant – below the golden eagle. With Petar I, further rearrangement of the coat of arms took place: he removed the royal insignia from the eagle and charged the eagle's breast with the Middle Arms of the Petrović-Njegoš while leaving the lion passant.

Prince Danilo also reorganised the coat of arms: he charged the golden eagle's breast with a shield with a blue background and a golden lion passant on green ground. In one claw the eagle held the orb, and in the other a sword and a sceptre. In the time of King Nicholas I, the sword was removed and later, in conformity with the Constitution of 1905, the colour of the eagle was changed from golden to silver as well as the colour of the inescutcheon – from blue to red.

Emblem of the Socialist Republic of Montenegro used from 1945 to 1992. A blue mountain was used from 1963–1974.

After World War II, Montenegrin statehood was reestablished and Montenegro became a federal part of the Second Yugoslavia. A national emblem was adopted in 1945 and it was designed in socialist style: Laurel wreath with Red Star, while the central motive was the Njegoš's Testament Church on Lovćen with sea waves in the background, representing the Montenegrin sea access. The national emblem of the Federal State of Montenegro was made in 1944 by Milan Božović, it was stylised in 1946 by Milo Milunović, and afterwards slightly changed in 1963 and 1974 (the shape of the red star). In 1993, the Montenegrin parliament introduced a coat of arms proper, returning to historical heritage. The old Montenegrin state's coat of arms was restored, but redesigned in the style of the federal coat of arms which were official adopted on 6 January 1994.

== See also ==
- Lion passant
- Double-headed eagle
- Armorial of sovereign states
- Njegoš's Testament Church
