= Flag of Ukraine =

National Flag of Ukraine
- Use: National flag, civil and state ensign
- Proportion: 2:3
- Adopted: 22 March 1918; 108 years ago (officially adopted); 24 August 1991; 35 years ago (de facto restored); 28 January 1992; 34 years ago (officially restored, current design)
- Design: A horizontal bicolour of blue and yellow
- Sky-blue version
- The sky-blue version that was used from 1917 to 1921 and later was reintroduced in 1992; it is still in widespread use next to the current darker version which was introduced in 2006.
- Naval ensign
- Use: Naval ensign
- Proportion: 2:3
- Adopted: 20 June 2006
- Design: White with a blue Saint George's cross that extends to the edges of the flag, with the national bicolour in the canton.

The national flag of Ukraine (Ukrainian: Державний прапор України, romanized: Derzhavnyi prapor Ukrayiny, pronounced [derˈʒɑu̯nɪj ˈprɑpor ʊkrɐˈjinɪ]) consists of equally sized horizontal bands of blue and yellow.

The blue and yellow bicolor flag was first seen during the 1848 Spring of Nations in Lemberg (Lviv), the capital of the Kingdom of Galicia and Lodomeria within the Austrian Empire. It was later adopted as a state flag by the short-lived Ukrainian People's Republic, the West Ukrainian People's Republic, and the Ukrainian State following the Russian Revolution.

In March 1939, it was also adopted by Carpatho-Ukraine. However, when Ukraine was part of the Soviet Union, the use of the bicolor flag was banned, and it was replaced by the flag of the Ukrainian Soviet Socialist Republic. This flag featured a red background, with an azure bottom and a golden hammer and sickle, along with a golden-bordered red star on top. When the Soviet Union dissolved in 1991, the bicolor flag gradually returned to use before being officially adopted again on 28 January 1992 by the Ukrainian parliament.

Ukraine has celebrated the Day of the National Flag on 23 August since 2004.

== Design ==
Ukrainian law states that the colours of the Ukrainian flag are "blue and yellow", but other state bodies have determined the colours. In the table below, the colours are presented according to DSTU 4512:2006 technical specifications: (The Cabinet of Ministers of Ukraine made this standard mandatory for military funeral flags in 2021.)

Scheme	Strong azure	Yellow
Pantone	Pantone Coated 2935 C	Pantone Coated Yellow 012 C
RAL	5019 Azure	1023 Gold (golden)
RGB color model	0, 87, 183	255, 215, 0
CMYK	100, 63, 0, 2	0, 2, 98, 0
HEX	#0057B7	#FFD700
Websafe	#0066CC	#FFCC00

There has been disagreement over the shade of blue used in the flag. Both dark blue (Ukrainian: синій) and sky blue (Ukrainian: блакитний) flags were historically used. When the flag was approved in 1992, the dark blue colour was chosen over sky blue for practical reasons: sky blue flags fade very quickly in the sun. Although the official standard was introduced in 2006, some manufacturers keep producing flags that do not match the standard.

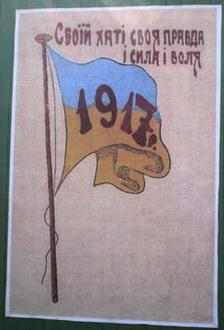
A Ukrainian independence poster (1917)

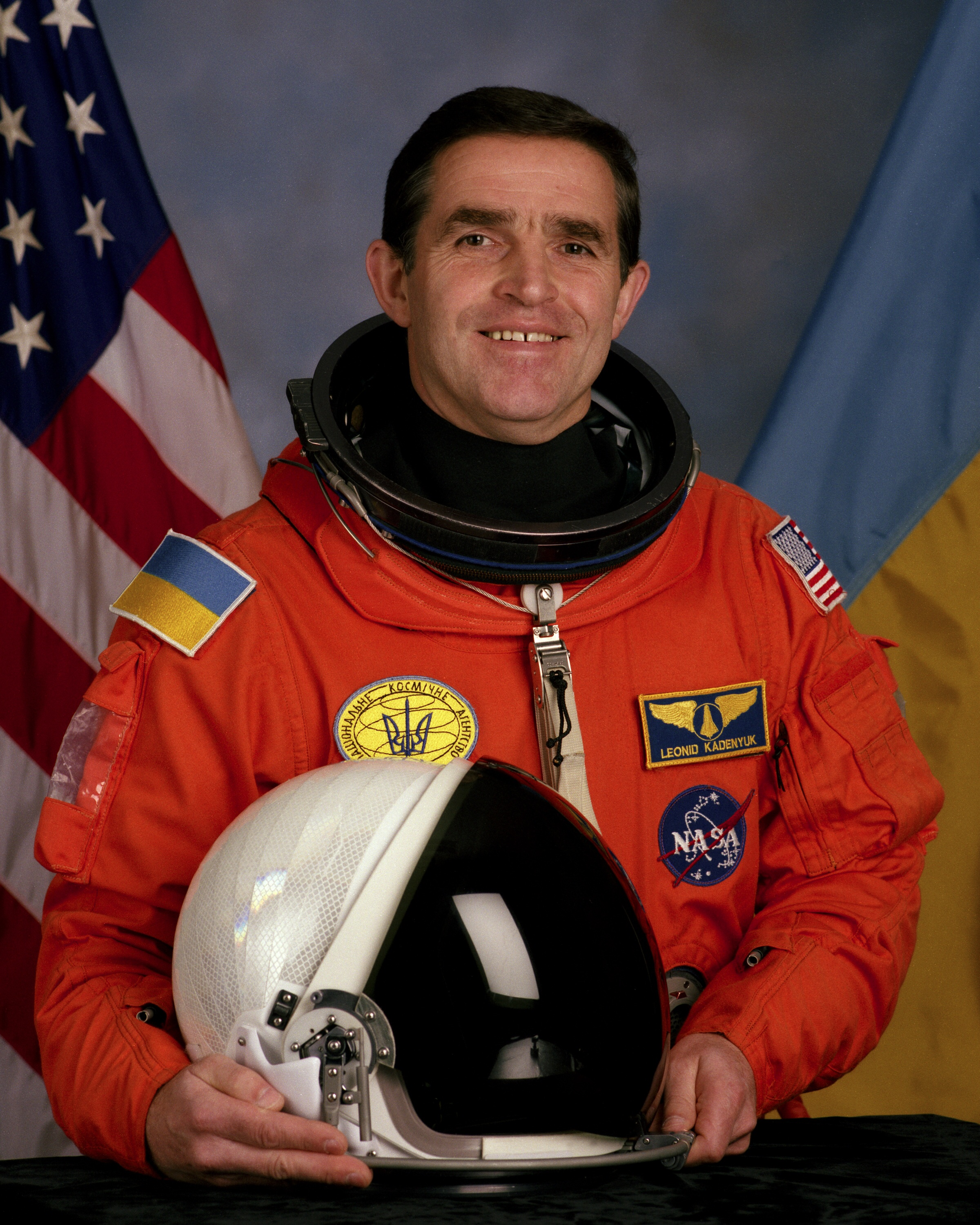
Leonid Kadenyuk at NASA (1997)

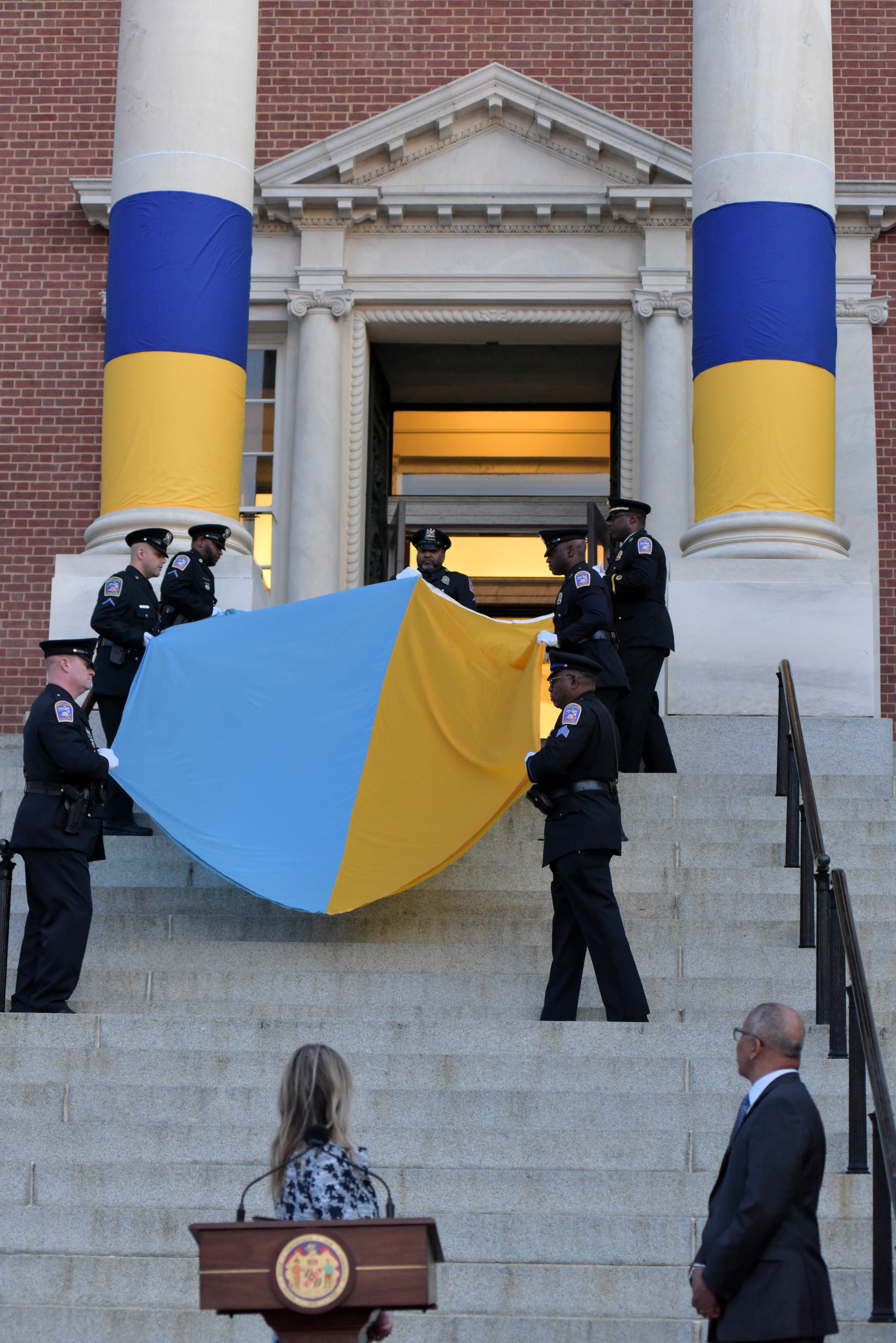
Maryland State House Ukraine Solidarity Vigil; note different shades of blue and yellow (2022)

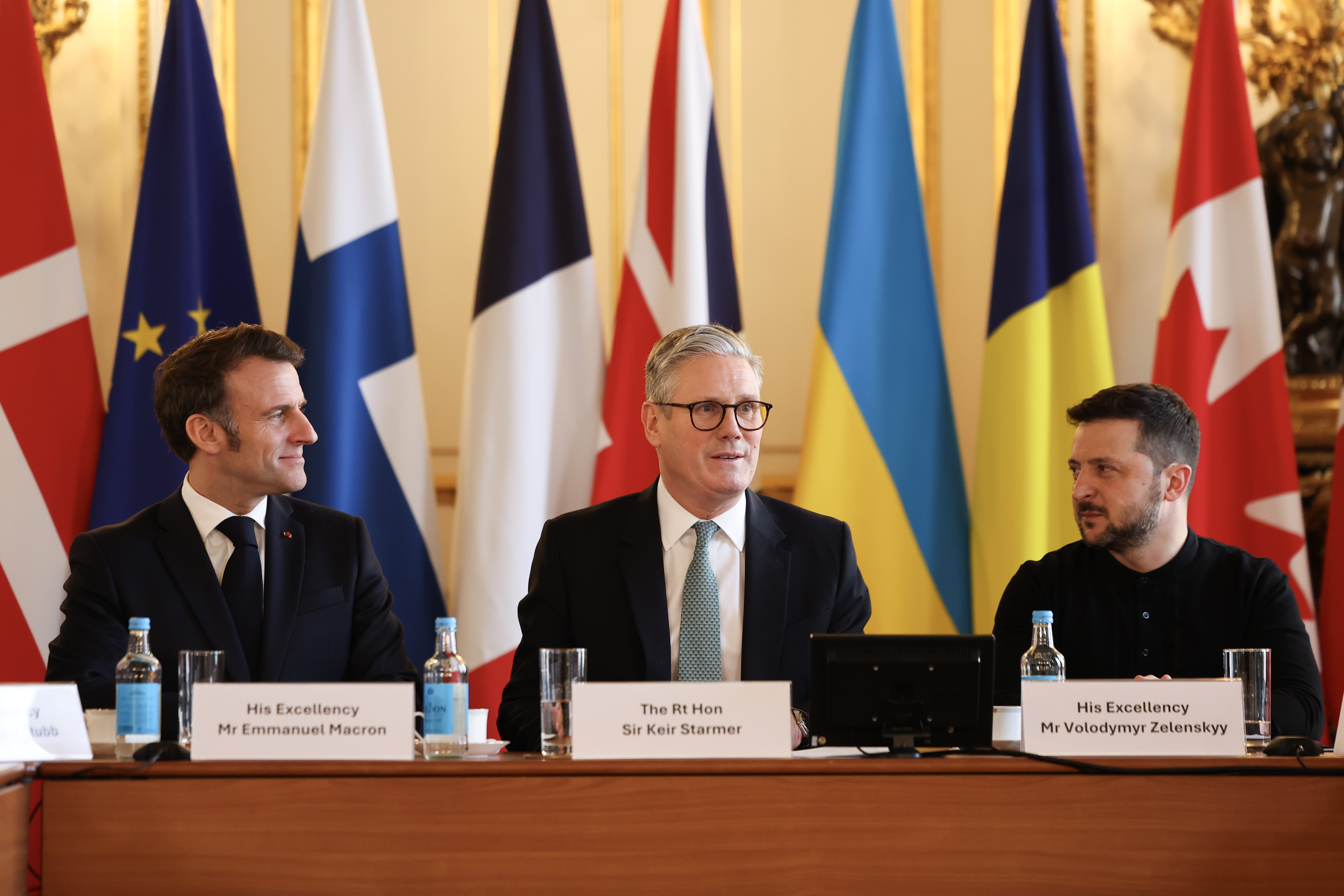
The Ukrainian flag being decorated at a 2025 conference of European leaders with a relatively light shade of blue, especially when being compared to other European national flags

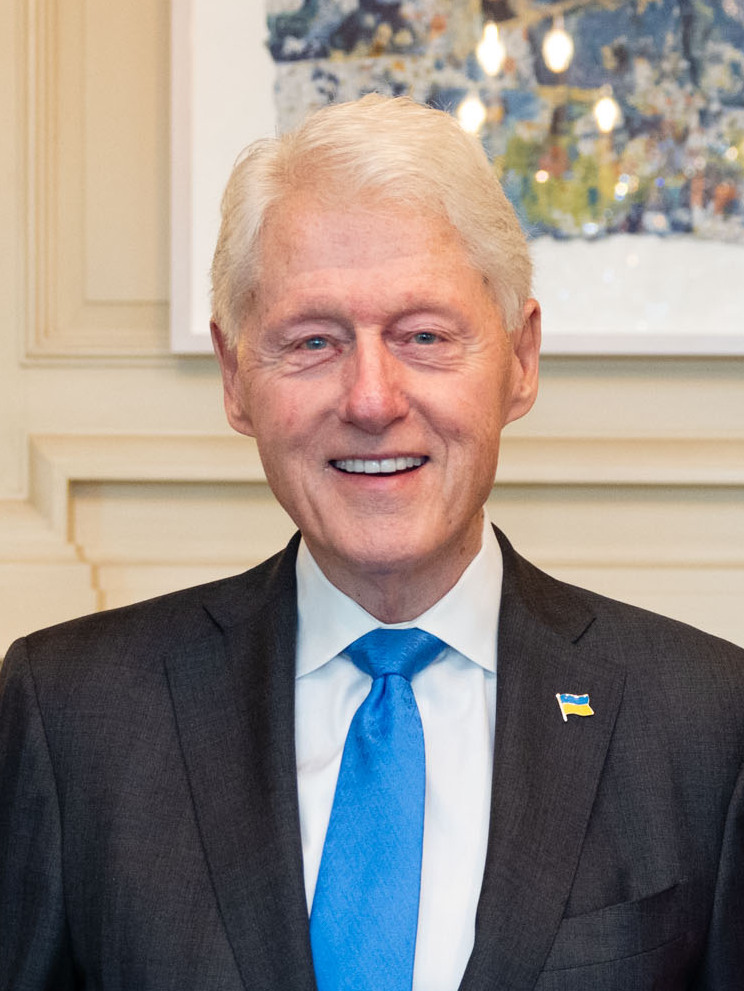
Bill Clinton with a Ukrainian flag lapel pin attached to his suit

The strip of the vehicle registration plate
The sky-blue version of the flag of Ukraine

Flag of Ukraine with the shades introduced in 2006

The flag is similar to that of the Austrian state of Lower Austria, the German city of Chemnitz, historical Kingdom of Dalmatia (now Croatia) and the Hungarian city of Pécs, but all of those flags have a darker shade of blue. The flag is also somewhat similar to that of the Malaysian state of Perlis and the English county of Durham (without the cross), but has a reversed colour arrangement, lighter shades of blue and yellow, and a different aspect ratio.

== Protocol and use ==
Article 20 of the Constitution of Ukraine states that "the State Flag of Ukraine is a banner of two equally sized horizontal bands of blue and yellow colour." (Ukrainian: "Державний Прапор України — стяг із двох рівновеликих горизонтальних смуг синього і жовтого кольорів.").

Hanging version of the Ukrainian flag

In addition to the normal horizontal format, many public buildings, such as the Verkhovna Rada, use vertical flags. Most town halls fly their town flag together with the national flag in this way; some town flags in Ukraine exist only in vertical form. The proportions of these vertical flags are not specified. When hung like a banner or draped, the blue band should be on the left. When flown from a vertical flagpole, the blue band must face the mast.

The flag did not appear on Ukrainian postal stamp issues until 1992, when they depicted the flag with the state coat of arms. Since then, the flag has frequently appeared on stamps. Cinderella stamps of the Organization of Ukrainian Nationalists were printed outside Ukraine during the Soviet period for patriotic purposes.

=== Decoration ===
Traditionally, the flag may be decorated with a golden fringe surrounding the perimeter of the flag, as long as it does not deface the flag proper. The tradition began with the flag of the Ukrainian SSR. In addition, the Great Soviet Encyclopedia shows a flag decorated with a gold star. Ceremonial displays of the flag, such as those in parades or on indoor posts, often use a fringe to enhance the allure of the flag. No specific law governs the use of the fringe. Traditionally, the Army, Guard, Navy and Air Force use a fringed flag for parades, colour guards and indoor displays, while the Office of the President and local authorities use a fringed flag on all occasions.

=== Places of continuous display ===
Ukrainian flags are customarily displayed continuously in certain locations.

- Maidan Nezalezhnosti, main square of Kyiv, traditional site for political rallies, including large-scale radical protest campaigns (Orange Revolution and Euromaidan)
- Presidential Administration Building, Verkhovna Rada building and Government Building
- Kyiv City Council
- Lviv High Castle
- Vernadsky Research Base
- State Border Guard Service of Ukraine sites
- National, regional and local government buildings
- Ukrainian embassies and consulates

=== Particular days for display ===
The flag is hoisted up to its full staff on the following days:

- 1 January: New Year's Day
- 7 January: Christmas (Julian)
- 22 January: Ukrainian Unity and Freedom Day
- 8 March: International Women's Day
- 1 & 2 May: International Workers' Day
- 8 May: Day of Remembrance and Victory over Nazism
- 28 June: Constitution Day
- 23 August: Flag Day
- 24 August: Independence Day
- 13 October: Defenders of Ukraine Day
- 21 November: Day of Dignity and Freedom
- 6 December: Armed Forces Day
- 25 December: Christmas (Gregorian/Neo-Julian)

=== Display at half-staff ===
The flag is displayed at half-staff (or half-mast) as a sign of respect or mourning. When done nationwide, such a step is proclaimed by the president. Half-mast means flying a flag two-thirds of the way up a flagpole; the top of the flag must be at least a flag's height from the top of the flagpole. Black ribbons indicate mourning on banners that can not be lowered to half-mast.

- 4th Saturday of November: Holodomor Memorial Day
- Other historical cases: mass victims of accidents, Russo-Ukrainian War and Euromaidan; death and state funeral of Lech and Maria Kaczyński, funeral of Pope John Paul II and September 11 attacks.

== Flag Day ==
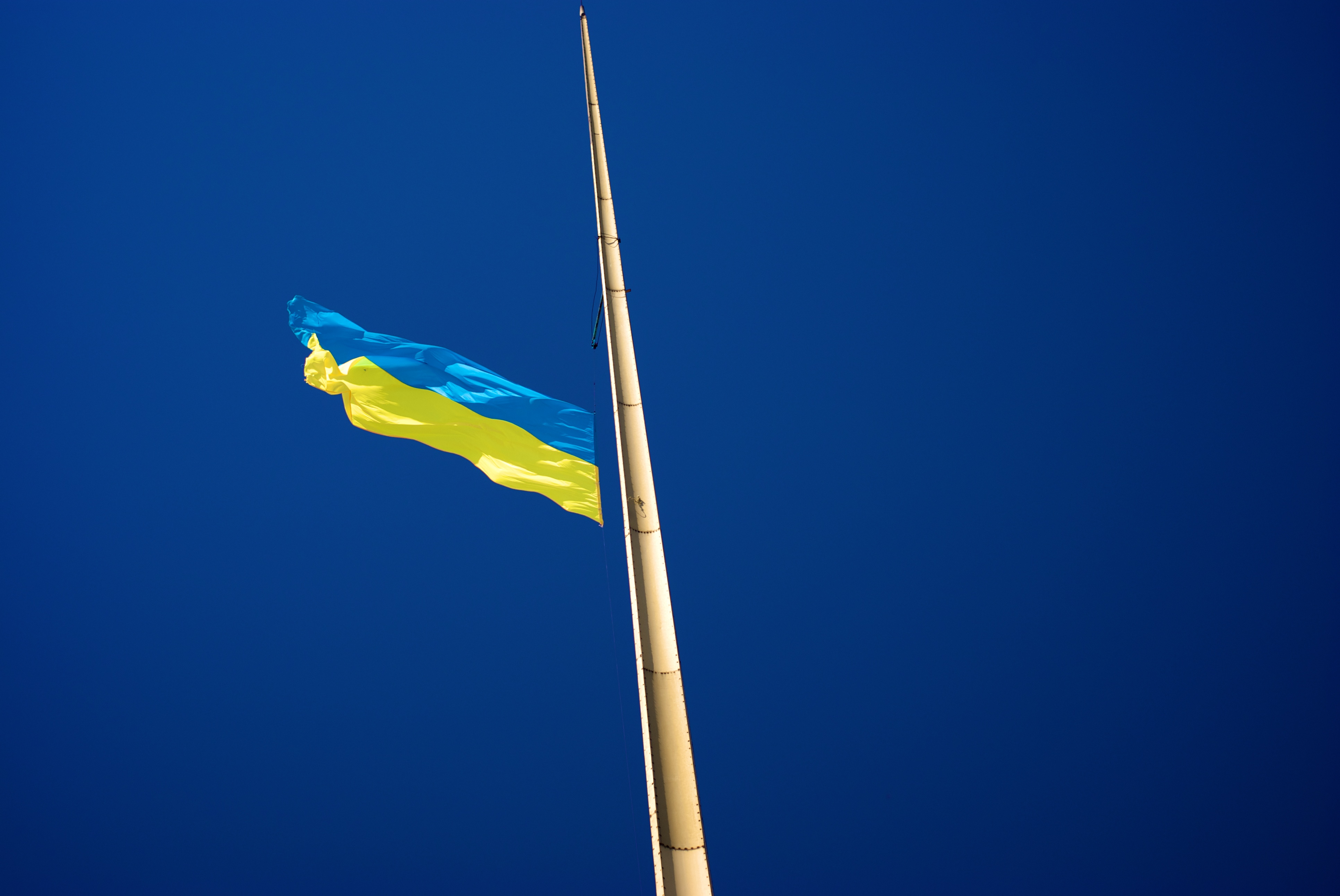
The flag of Ukraine at Kyiv City Hall

Typical agricultural landscape of Ukraine in the Kherson Oblast

The Day of the National Flag in Ukraine is celebrated on 23 August; it began in 2004. Previously, 24 July was National Flag Day in Kyiv. The first ceremonial raising of the yellow-and-blue Ukrainian flag in modern times took place on 24 July 1990, at the flagstaff of the Kyiv City Council, two years before the flag was officially adopted as the National flag. Since 1992, the Independence Day of Ukraine has been celebrated on 24 August. Following a government decree, the flag must be flown from public buildings on this date and certain other holidays; not all are public holidays. Flags must also be flown on parliamentary election days and regional-specific flag days. The public display of flags to mark other events, such as the election of the president or the death of a prominent politician (whereupon flags are flown at half-mast), can be declared at the discretion of the Cabinet of Ministers. When flags are flown at half-mast, vertical flags are not lowered. A black mourning ribbon is instead attached, either atop the mast if hung from a pole, or to each end of the flag's supporting cross-beams if flown like a banner.

== History ==
=== Kingdom of Galicia–Volhynia ===
==== Grand Duchy of Lithuania ====
Flag of the Kingdom of Ruthenia

The roots of Ukrainian national symbols come from pre-Christian times when yellow and blue prevailed in traditional ceremonies, reflecting fire and water. The most solid proof of yellow and blue colours can be traced back as far as the Battle of Grunwald in 1410, in which militia formations from the Ruthenian Voivodeship participated.

Przemyśl Land

Ruthenian land GDL

Ruthenian land GDL

Kholm Land

Lviv Land

Podolia Land

Halych Land

=== Cossack age ===
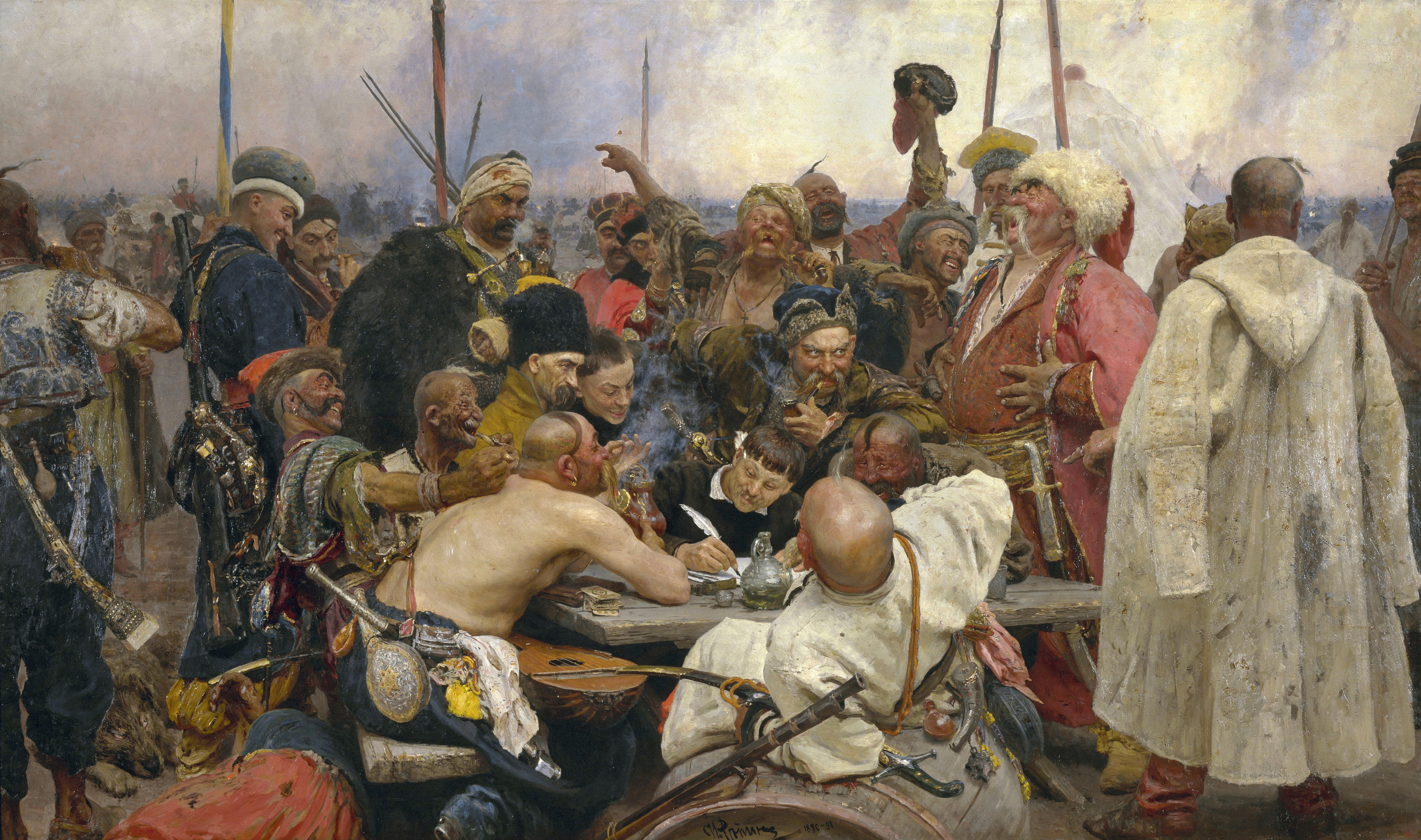
Cossack flags depicted in Reply of the Zaporozhian Cossacks by Ilya Repin, 1880–1891

Blue-yellow, red-black, crimson-olive and especially raspberry colour banners were widely used by Ukrainian Cossacks between the 16th and 18th centuries. These were not the only possible combinations, since normally Cossacks would fly their hetman's banners, which were similar to the coats of arms of the nobility. Also, yellow and blue were the colours common on coats of arms in Galicia. In fact, the coat of arms of Lviv to this day remains a golden lion on a blue field.

Khmelnytsky's flag with Archangel Michael

Flag used by Khmelnytsky

Cossack flags from 1651

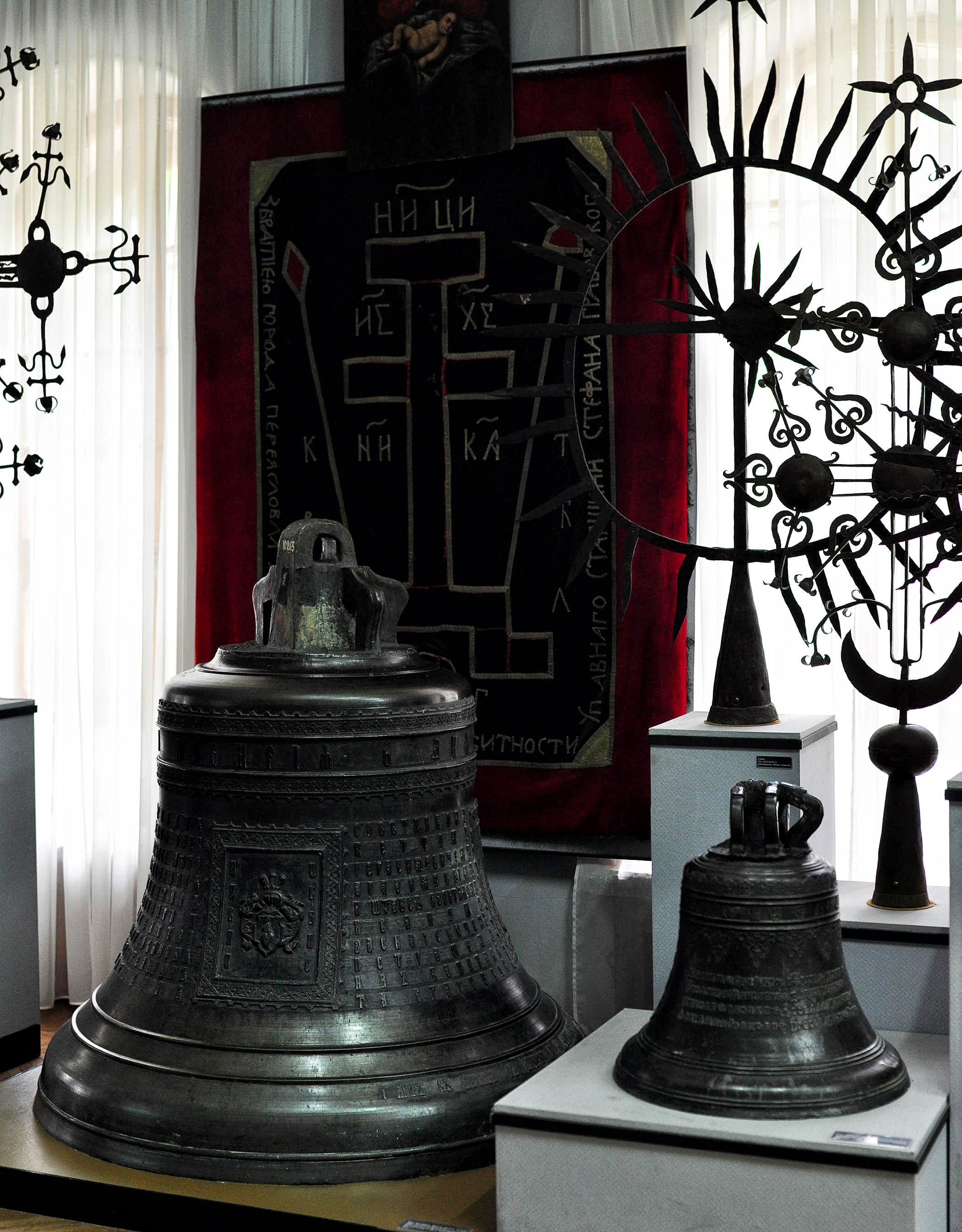
A Cossack flag from 1695

Zaporozhian Sich flag

Flag of the Cossack Hetmanate

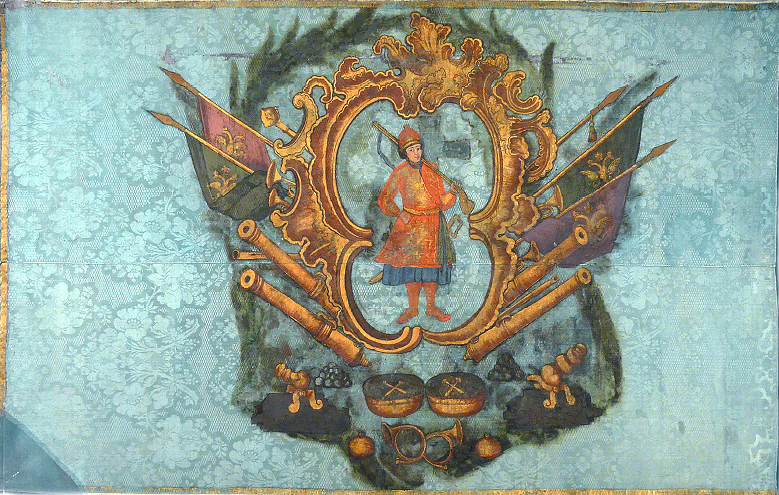
Flag of the Sencha sotnia of Lubny Regiment

Flag Black Sea Cossack Host flag from 1803

=== Imperial age ===
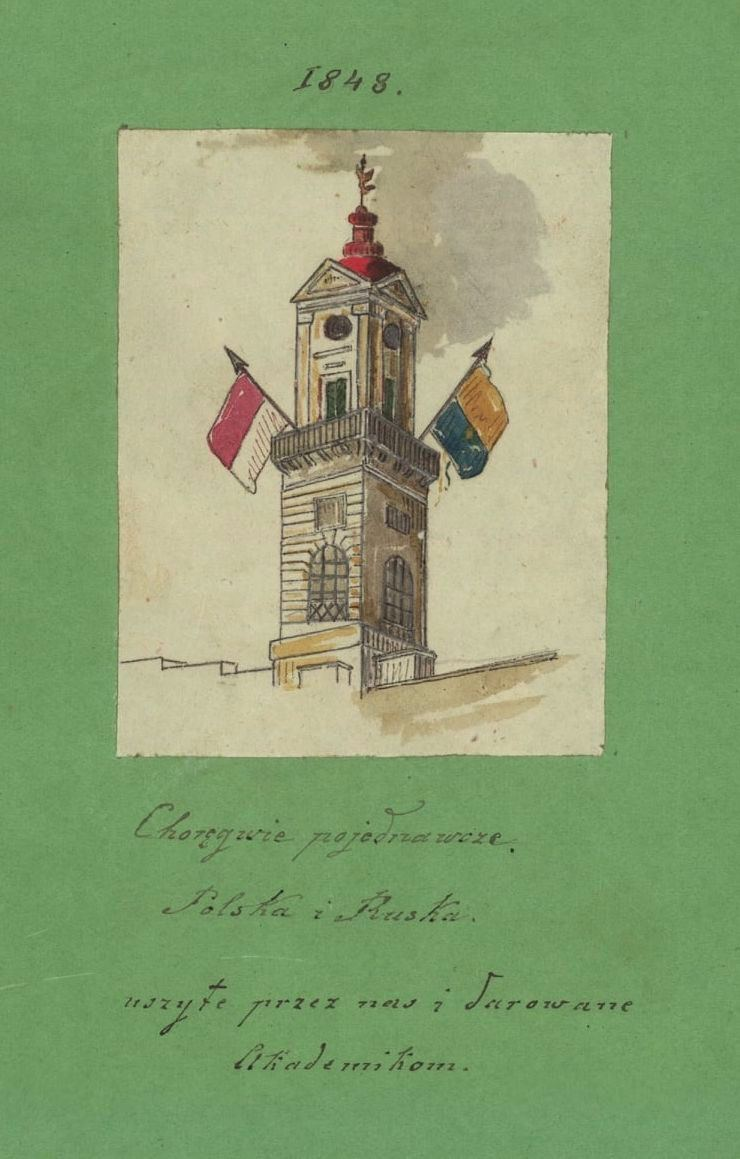
A drawing by Polish artist and painter Celina Dominikowska. Depicting the hoisting of the Ruthenian (Ukrainian) and Polish flags over the Lviv Town Hall in 1848.

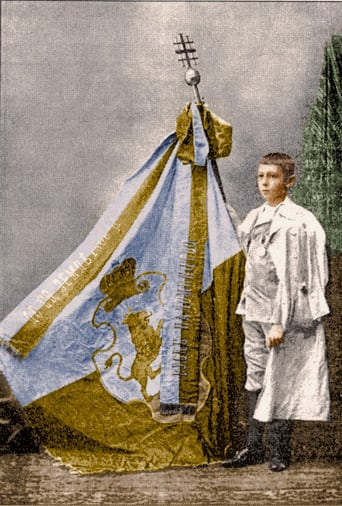
A boy carrying a blue-yellow flag with the Ruthenian lion in the middle during the Ruthenian pilgrimage to the Holy Land, 1906

Some put the starting point of the adoption of the current national flag of Ukraine to 1848 when, during the Spring of Nations on 22 April 1848, a blue-and-yellow banner was adopted by the Supreme Ruthenian Council in Lemberg (Lviv), the capital of the Kingdom of Galicia and Lodomeria (a crownland of the Austrian Empire). On 25 June 1848 two blue and yellow banners flew over the city's magistrate (Rathaus) for the first time. It is unknown who hang the banners and the Austrian authorities dissociated themselves from this action, as did the Supreme Ruthenian Council itself. The banners hung for almost a week. At the request of the Supreme Ruthenian Council, on 15 May 1849 a yellow-and-blue flag hang again on the Rathaus, this time for one day. Although this move did not have significant consequences, the newly formed Ukrainian divisions in the Imperial-Royal Landwehr of the Austro-Hungarian Army used blue-and-yellow banners in their insignia.

During the Russian Revolution of 1905, this flag was used by Ukrainians of the Dnieper Ukraine.

Unofficial flag of Galicia and Lodomeria (1772—1800)

Unofficial flag of Galicia and Lodomeria (1800—1849)

Unofficial flag of Galicia and Lodomeria (1849—1918)

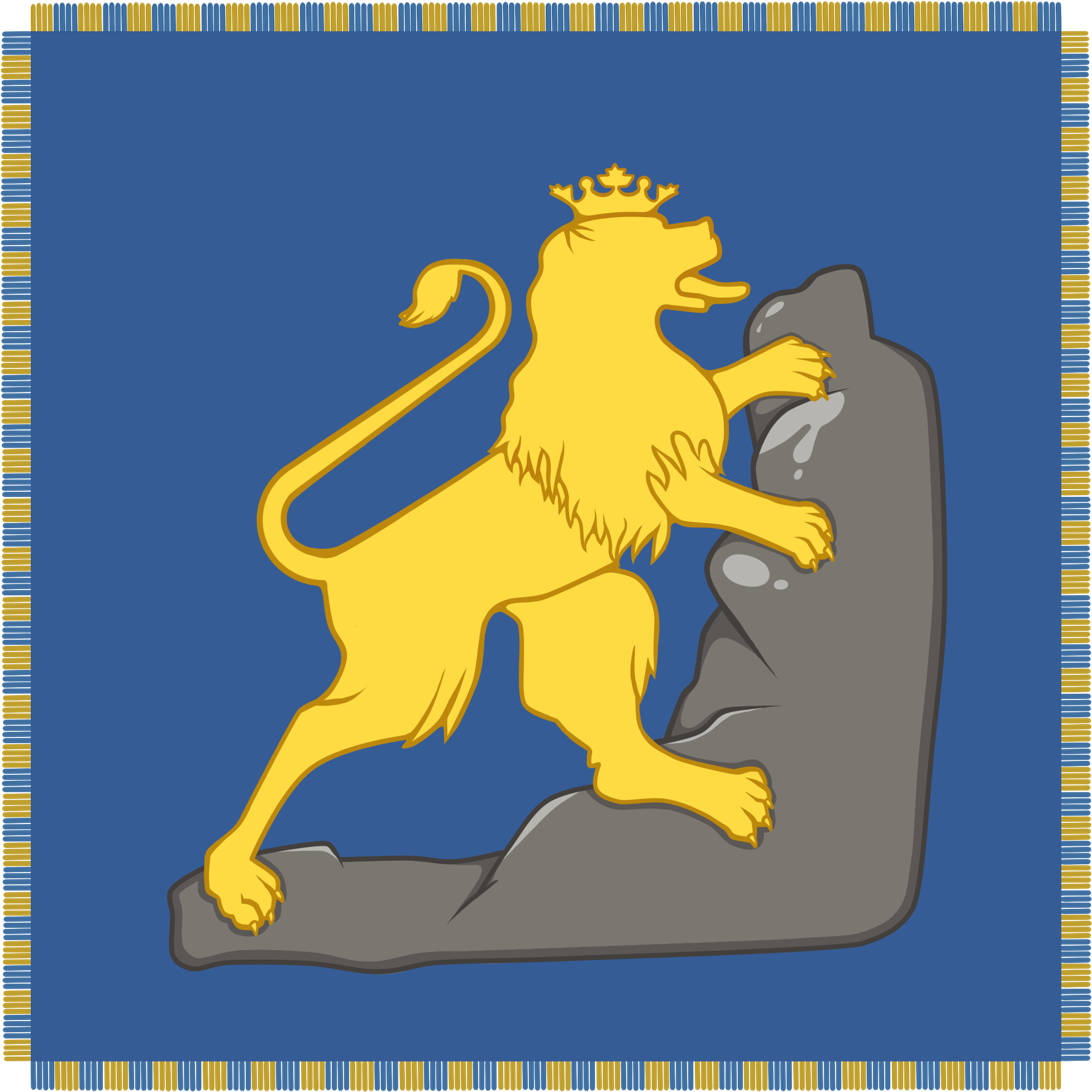
Flag of the Ruthenian National Guard From Yavoriv (1848)

Version of the national flag from 1848

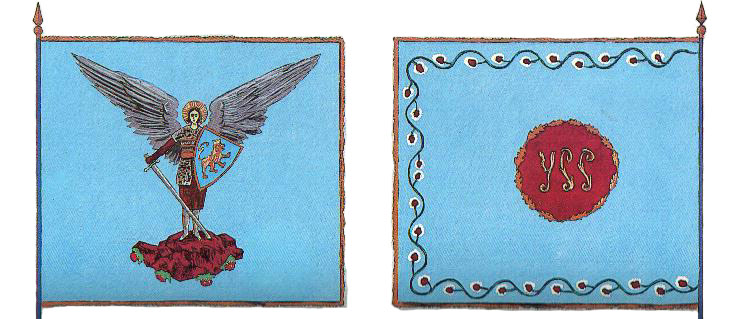
Flag of the Ukrainian Sich Riflemen

=== Early independence: 1917–1921 ===
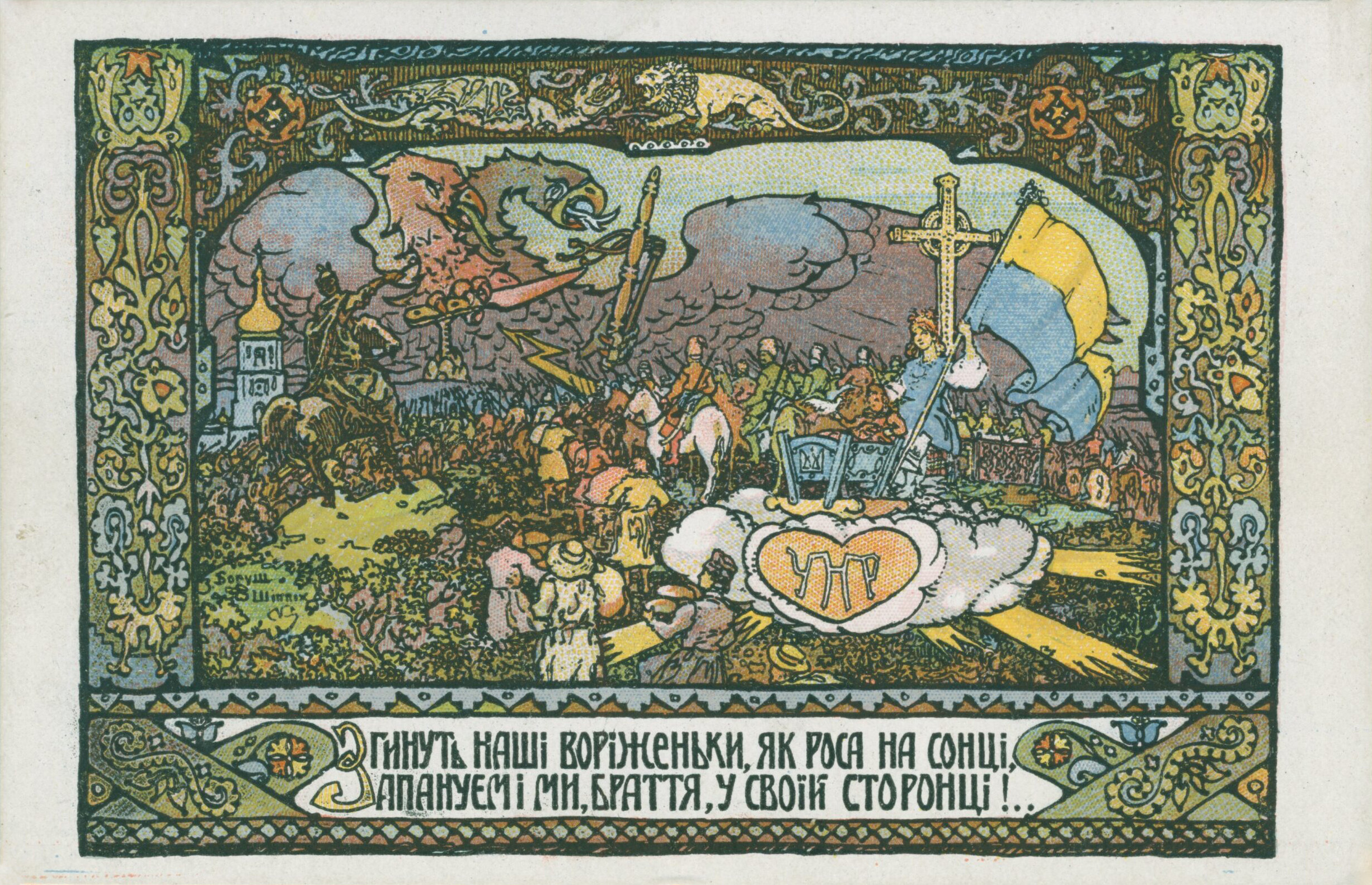
Artwork depicting the yellow-over-blue flag used by the UPR during the Ukrainian War of Independence, 1918

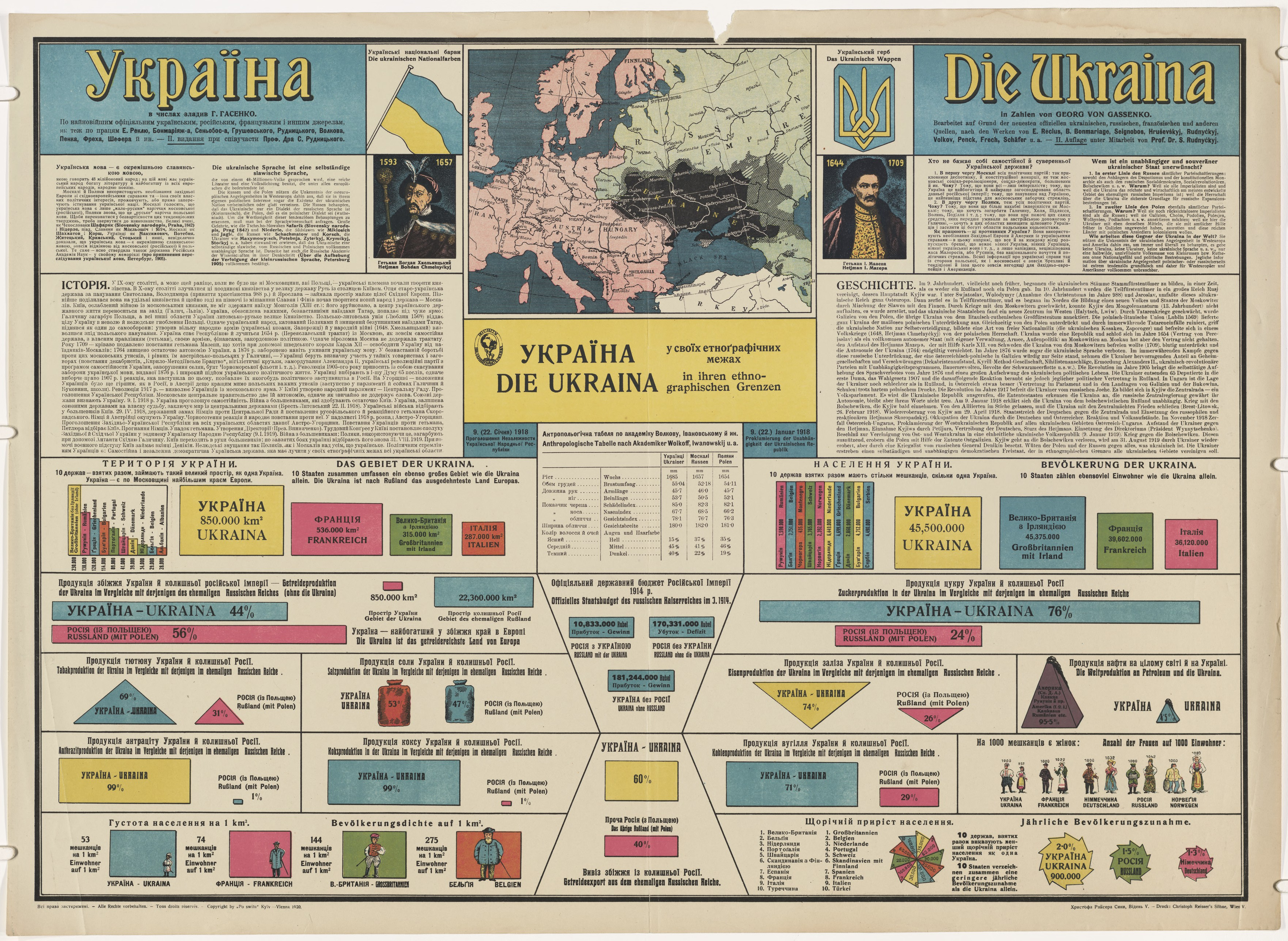
1920 publication featuring Ukraine's flag and coat of arms

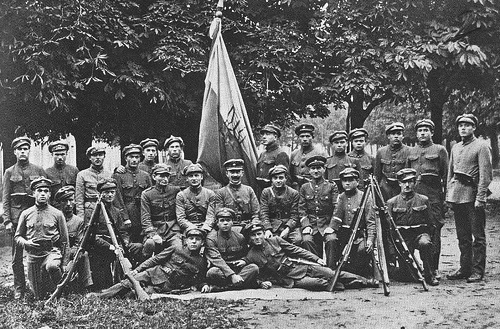
Ukrainian Galician Army troops with the blue and yellow flag, 1918

Both blue-yellow and yellow-blue flags were widely used during the Ukrainian struggle for independence in 1917. For the first time in the history of the Russian Empire, the blue-yellow flag was flown on 25 March 1917 in Petrograd during a 20,000-strong mass demonstration. On the territory of Ukraine the national flag was flown for the first time in Kyiv on 29 March 1917 by soldiers. On 1 April 1917, Kyiv saw a 100,000-strong demonstration where over 320 national flags were flown. Afterwards, similar demonstrations with Ukrainian flags took place across the entire Russian Empire, even beyond ethnic Ukrainian lands. Numerous famous Ukrainian politicians wrote about the 1 April demonstration, including Mykhailo Hrushevsky and Serhiy Yefremov, noting that there were blue-and-yellow flags, while Dmytro Doroshenko claimed that they were yellow and blue. The blue-yellow flag was flown at the First Ukrainian Military Congress on 18 May 1917.

The official flag established by the Ukrainian People's Republic in 1918 was blue-yellow. Instead, they refer to the decision on the Fleet Flag, which was to be light blue–yellow, as an indication that the official flag was light blue–yellow. Also adopted were several other service flags of the Ukrainian People's Republic.

The official flag of Pavlo Skoropadsky's Hetmanate was also light blue-yellow and remained the same under the Directorate of Symon Petlura. The flag of the West Ukrainian People's Republic was blue-yellow. The stateless Makhnovshchina, which existed during the Ukrainian War of Independence, used the black flag.

Among Ukrainian immigrant organisations, there were proponents of both blue-yellow and yellow-blue flags. Eventually, an agreement was reached to use the blue-yellow flag until the issue could be resolved by an independent Ukraine.

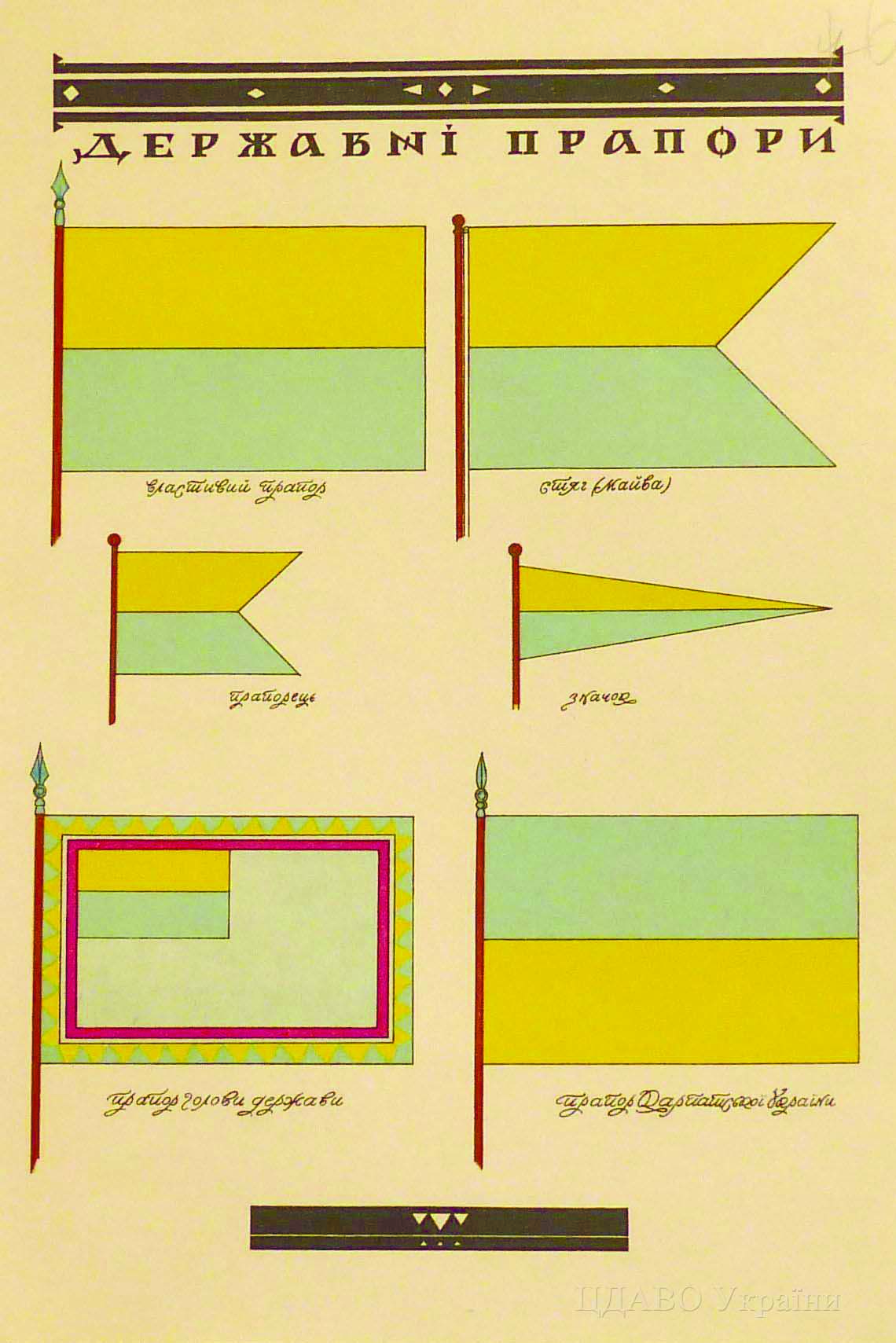
Projects of the national flag by Mykola Bytynsky

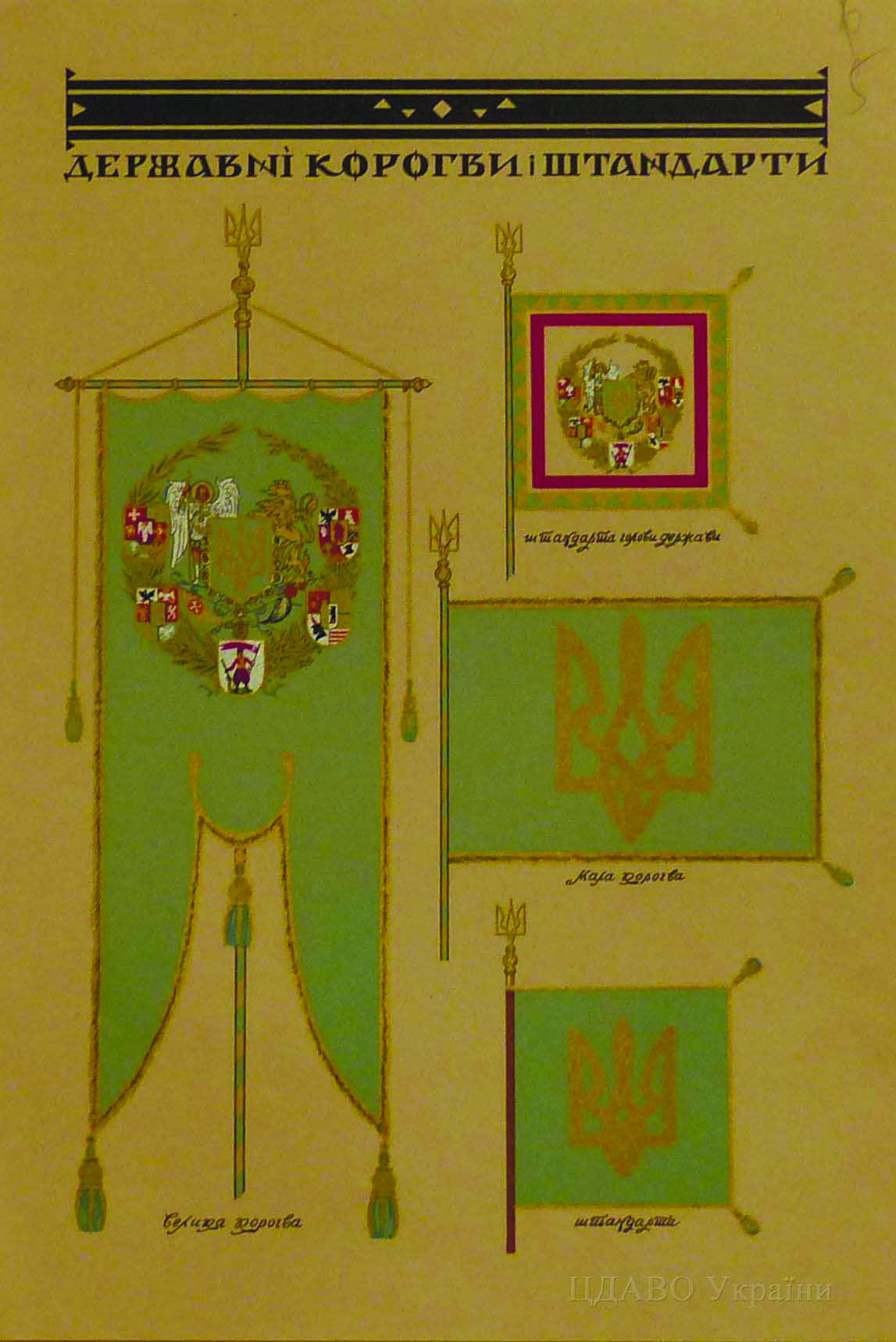
Projects of state flags and standards by Mykola Bytynsky

Flag of the Ukrainian People's Republic (1917–1920)

Flag of the Ukrainian People's Republic (1920–1922)

Flag of the Ukrainian State (1918)

Flag of the Crimean Democratic Republic (1917–1918)

Version of the flag of the Ukrainian Far Eastern Republic (1917–1922) in Siberia

Version of the flag of the Ukrainian Far Eastern Republic (1917–1922) in Siberia

Version of the flag of the Ukrainian Far Eastern Republic (1917–1922) in Siberia

Obverse of the banner used by Svyryd Kotsur (1920)

Reverse of the banner used by Svyryd Kotsur (1920)

Flag of the Makhnovshchina (1919–1921)

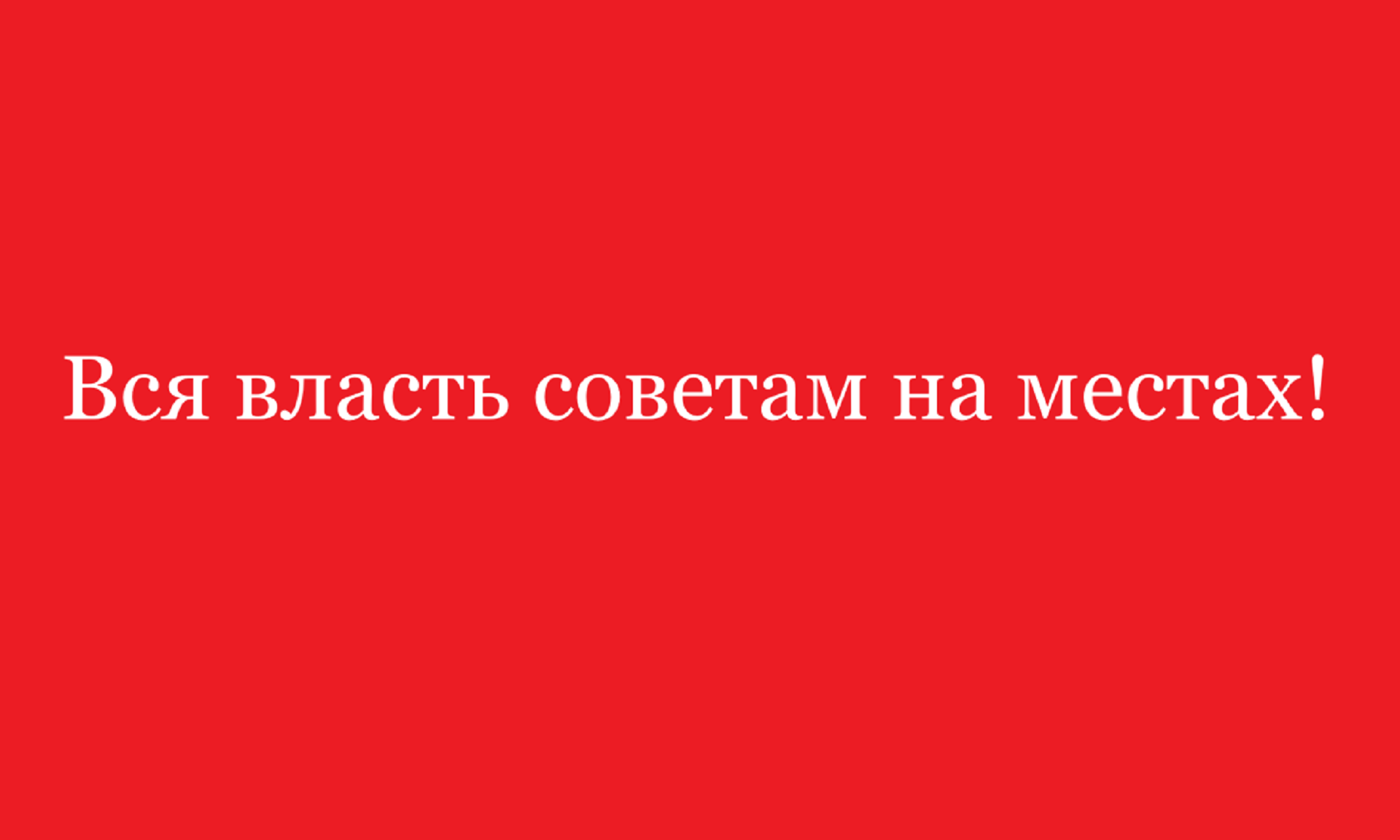
Flag of the Makhnovshchina (1919–1921)

Flag of Crimean Tatars

Flag of the West Ukrainian People's Republic (1918–1919)

Flag of the Komancza Republic (1918–1919)

Flag of the Kuban People's Republic (1918–1920)

Flag of the Lemko Republic (1918–1920)

Flag of the Hutsul Republic (1919)

Flag of the Kholodny Yar Republic (1919–1922)

Flag of Medvyn rebellion

=== Soviet Ukraine: 1922–1991 ===
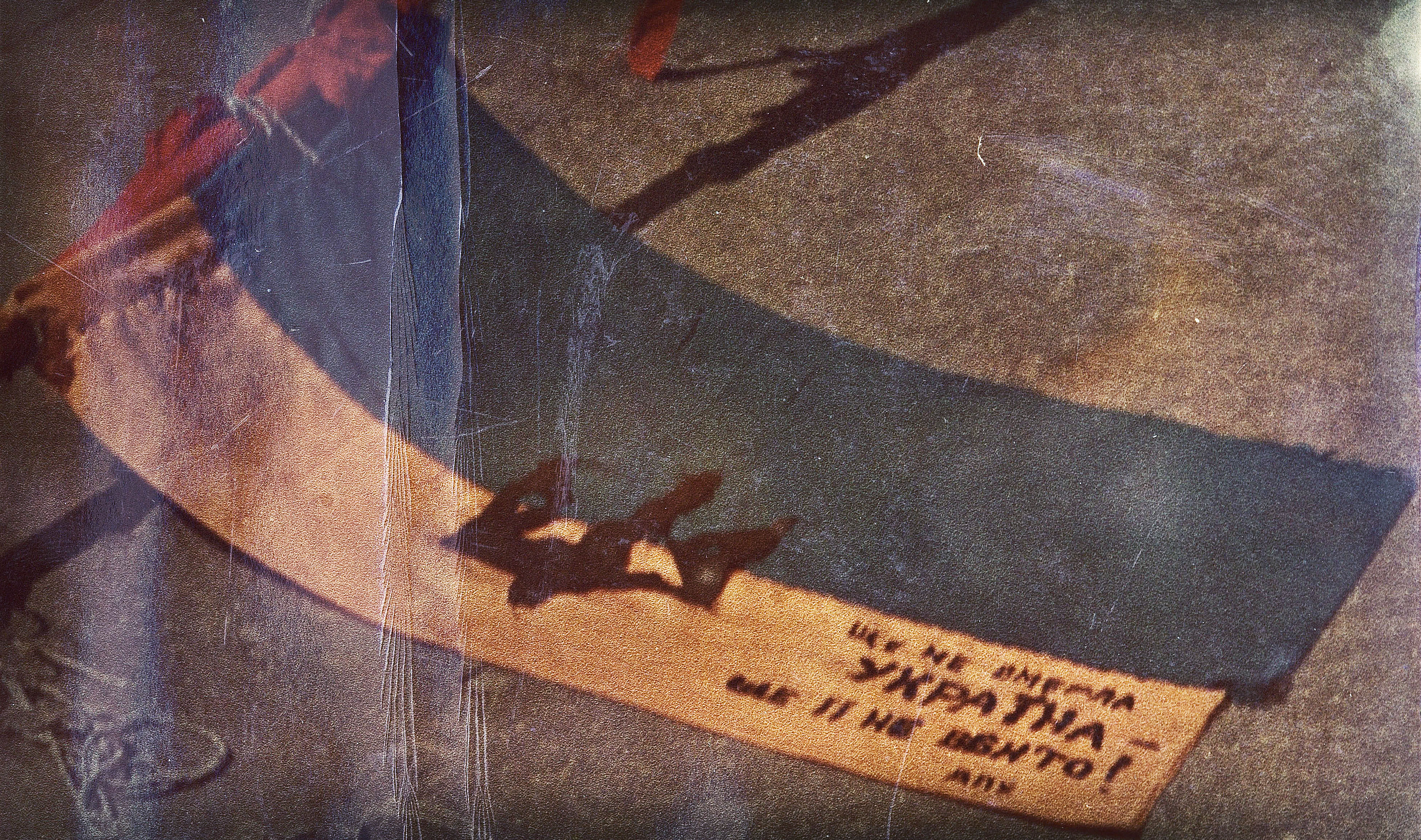
Photo of the Ukrainian flag confiscated by the KGB after it was flown in one of the Kyiv universities in 1966. The flag contains lines alluding to the Ukrainian anthem: "Ukraine has not perished, it has not been killed yet".

During Soviet rule, the Ukrainian flag was banned, and anyone displaying it could be criminally prosecuted for "anti-Soviet propaganda". The first flag of the Ukrainian Soviet Socialist Republic was adopted on 10 March 1919, to serve as the symbol of state of Soviet Ukraine. Details of the official flag changed periodically before the break-up of the Soviet Union in 1991, but all were based on the red flag of the October Revolution in Russia and an exact replica of the flags of the neighbouring Russian SFSR. The first flag was red with the gold Cyrillic sans-serif letters У.С.С.Р. (U.S.S.R., acronym for Ukrainskaya Sotsialisticheskaya Sovetskaya Respublika in the Russian language). In the 1930s, a gold border was added to the flag. In 1937, a new flag was adopted, with a small gold hammer and sickle added above the gold Cyrillic serif У.Р.С.Р. (U.R.S.R., for Ukrainska Radianska Sotsialistychna Respublika in the Ukrainian language).

Red flag (1917)

Flag of Ukrainian Soviet Republic

Flag of the Ukrainian People's Republic of Soviets (1917–1919)

Flag of the Ukrainian People's Socialist Republic (1919)

Flag of Odessa Soviet Republic

Flag of Chyhyryn Soviet Republic

Flag of Donetsk–Krivoy Rog Soviet Republic

Flag of Kuban Soviet Republic

Flag of Black Sea Soviet Republic

Flag of Kuban–Black Sea Soviet Republic

1919–1929 flag of Soviet Ukraine

1929–1937 flag of Soviet Ukraine

1937–1949 flag of Soviet Ukraine

1949–1991 flag of Soviet Ukraine

Flag of the Ukrainian ethnic minority in SFR Yugoslavia (1946–1992)

=== Interbellum and Reichskommissariat Ukraine ===
The Organisation of Ukrainian Nationalists is a Ukrainian political organisation which as a movement was originally created in 1929 in Western Ukraine (interwar Poland at the time). For a long time, the OUN did not officially have its own flag; however, during the Hungarian and Polish aggression against the Republic of Carpathian Ukraine in 1939, Carpathian Sich, a militarised wing of the OUN, adopted as its flag a design taken from the OUN's emblem – a golden nationalistic trident on a blue background. The flag was finalised and only officially adopted by the organisation in 1964 at the 5th Assembly of Ukrainian Nationalists.

The Ukrainian Insurgent Army was a Ukrainian nationalist paramilitary and later partisan army that engaged in a series of guerrilla conflicts during World War II against Nazi Germany, the Soviet Union, Czechoslovakia, and both underground and communist Poland. The group was the military wing of the Organisation of Ukrainian Nationalists — Bandera faction (the OUN-B), originally formed in Volyn in the spring and summer of 1943. Its official date of creation is 14 October 1942. The battle flag of the UPA was a 2:3 ratio red-and-black banner. The flag continues to be a symbol of the Ukrainian nationalist movement. The colours of the flag symbolise 'Ukrainian red blood spilled on Ukrainian black earth'.

Flag of Carpatho-Ukraine

Flag of 1941 Ukrainian National Government

Flag of Kolky Republic

Flag of the Ukrainian Insurgent Army and Organisation of Ukrainian Nationalists, Bandera faction

Flag of the Organisation of Ukrainian Nationalists, Melnyk faction

In 1949, the flag of the Soviet Ukraine was changed once again. The Soviet Union managed to obtain two additional seats in the United Nations by adding Ukraine and Byelorussia as member states. The flag change came about because all the Soviet flags were the same. The new Ukrainian flag consisted of red (top, 2/3) and azure (bottom, 1/3) stripes, with the golden star, hammer and sickle in the top left corner. Communist party leaders such as Nikita Khrushchev and Lazar Kaganovich feared using words like 'light blue' and 'blue' in the official flag colours, as they were the terms used by the Ukrainian diaspora.

During the Soviet period, multiple unsanctioned attempts to hoist the national blue-and-yellow flag were made. In 1958, an underground group was established in the village of Verbytsia, Khodoriv Raion; its members raised national flags and spread anti-Soviet pamphlets under cover of darkness.

=== Return of the national flag ===
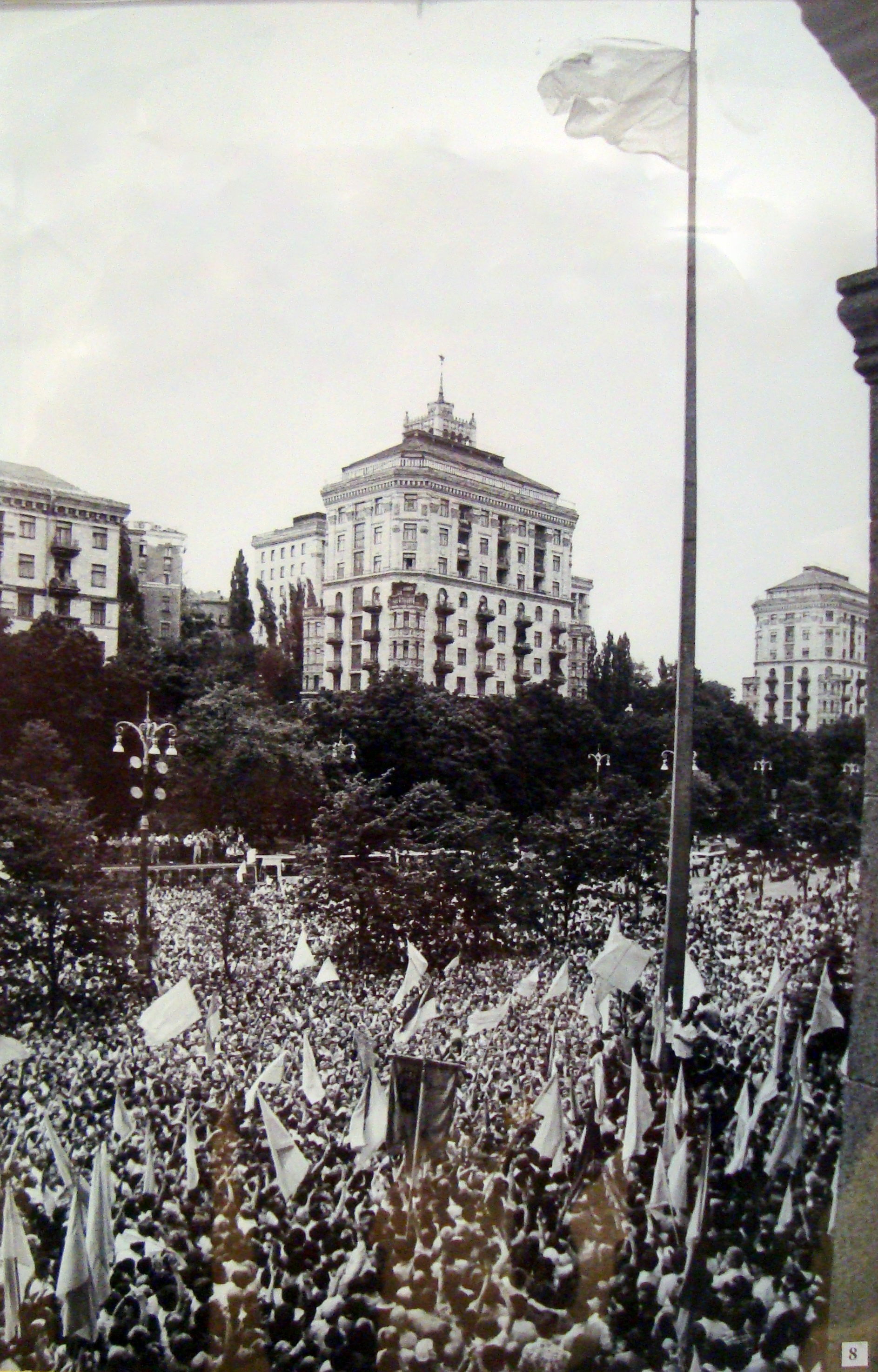
The Ukrainian national flag was raised outside the City Hall in Kiev for the first time on 24 July 1990.

Under the influence of Mikhail Gorbachev's policies of perestroika and glasnost, individual Soviet republics gained a strengthened sense of national identity, leading to the collapse of the Soviet Union in 1991. This was particularly true for the three Baltic states and Western Ukraine, which were the last territories annexed into Soviet Union. The national awakening was accompanied by attempts to restore historical national symbols. In 1988, the Supreme Soviet of the Lithuanian SSR re-established Lithuania's national flag and coat of arms as the state symbol. The parliaments of Latvia and Estonia soon followed suit.

The events in the Baltic countries soon led to similar patterns in Ukraine. In particular, West Ukraine and the Ukrainian SSR's capital city of Kyiv were the scenes of near-constant political demonstrations, in which yellow-and-blue flags were waved by demonstrators.

- On 14 March 1990, the Ukrainian flag was raised for the first time since the establishment of the Soviet Union in the small city of Stryi.
- On 20 March 1990, the Ternopil town council voted on the use and re-establishment of the yellow-and-blue flag and the tryzub and Shche ne vmerla Ukrainy national anthem. The same day, the yellow-and-blue national flag was flown for the first time in 80 years on a governmental building in Kyiv, replacing the then-official red-azure flag of the Ukrainian SSR.
- On 28 April 1990, the Lviv oblast council (oblasna rada) also allowed the use of the national symbols of Ukraine within the Oblast.
- On 29 April 1990, the yellow-and-blue flag was flown from the Ternopil city theatre's flagstaff without the flag of the Soviet Union hanging above it.
- After 24 July 1990, the yellow-and-blue flag was flown for the first time over an official governmental building, the Kyiv City Council, on Maidan Nezalezhnosti Square of Khreshchatyk Street.
- After the declaration of independence of Ukraine on 24 August 1991, the national yellow-and-blue flag flew for the first time over the Ukrainian Parliament (Verkhovna Rada) building on 4 September 1991.

As the Soviet red and azure flag remained the de jure flag of the newly-independent Ukraine, the blue and yellow flag was provisionally adopted for official ceremonies in August 1991 following Ukrainian independence, before officially being restored on 28 January 1992 by the Parliament of Ukraine. According to Stepan Khmara, at the time, support for readopting the blue and yellow flag as Ukraine's national flag was nearly universal among Ukrainians, with no realistic alternatives being offered.

At the beginning of the Russian invasion of Ukraine, landmarks all over the world were lit up with the colours of the Ukrainian flag, while numerous cities raised the Ukrainian flag in solidarity. Kastuś Kalinoŭski Regiment, an independent Belarusian volunteer regiment, also adopted the colours of the Ukrainian flag in its insignia.

Flag of post-Soviet Ukraine used from 24 August 1991 to 28 January 1992, de jure

Flag of post-Soviet Ukraine used from 8 September 1991 to 28 January 1992 (blue-yellow, lighter shades), de facto

Flag of post-Soviet Ukraine used from 8 September 1991 to 28 January 1992 (Soviet shades from previous SSR flag), de facto

Flag of post-Soviet Ukraine used from 8 September 1991 to 28 January 1992 (blue-yellow, darker shades), de facto
The sky-blue version that was in use until 2006; it still remains in unofficial widespread use next to the current darker version.

Flag of Ukraine with lighter shades is non-standard but has been frequently used

Flag of Ukraine with the shades introduced in 2006

== Controversies ==
=== Origin ===
One claimed version is that, since one of the first known coloured depictions of the coat of arms of Kyiv was mainly in yellow-blue colours, this tradition may have existed since the time of the Nordic-Slavic Grand Prince of Kyiv Volodymyr the Great. However, the blue-yellow colouring dates back to Kievan Rus', as an early version of the Tryzub, Ukraine's national coat of arms, sported the same colouring as the seal of Sviatoslav I of Kyiv (c. AD 945). During the 1709 Battle of Poltava, the Cossacks following Mazepa fought under yellow-blue banners, while their Swedish allies were under yellow ones. Some Cossacks and noblemen had coats of arms in yellow and blue.

=== Yellow-blue versus blue-yellow ===
Ukrainians commonly refer to the flag as "yellow and light blue" (Ukrainian: жовто-блакитний, zhovto-blakytnyi)—a different version of the flag used during UNR (Ukrainian National Republic) years (1917–1921) with yellow on the top and blue on the bottom. The yellow on the top allegedly represents golden domes (cupolas) of Christian churches and the blue the Dnieper river.

The head of the Ukrainian Heraldry Society, Andriy Grechylo, points to the fact that the discussion about order of colours was taking place as far back as 1918. Nonetheless, both governments of the Ukrainian People's Republic as well as the Ukrainian State defined that the upper half would be light-blue, while the lower would be yellow. During 1918 it was taken into consideration that light blue would lose its shade under sun, therefore it was decided to make the colour darker.

Already in the 1918 draft of the Constitution of the Ukrainian People's Republic, the order of colours was defined as blue and yellow. The same order could be found in legislative acts of the West Ukrainian People's Republic for November 1918 and the Republic of Carpathian Ukraine on 15 March 1939. The argument on the order of colours was taking place in the Ukrainian diaspora as well. In 1949 it was decided that, until Ukraine defined a single state flag, the diaspora would use the blue-and-yellow banner.

=== Attempts to revive Soviet flags ===
On 21 April 2011, the Verkhovna Rada passed a law allowing the Victory Banner to be raised on Victory Day. The current Victory Banner was adopted in Russia in 2007. On 20 May 2011, the law was signed by the President of Ukraine Viktor Yanukovych. On 17 June 2011, the Constitutional Court of Ukraine recognised the law as unconstitutional and proposed that the parliament implement required amendments to the Constitution of Ukraine.

On 9 April 2015, the Ukrainian parliament passed legislation on decommunization, banning the promotion of symbols of "Communist and National Socialist totalitarian regimes". Since then, Soviet symbols, like the Victory Banner, have only been allowed in cemeteries.

Soviet flags have been flown in territories outside of the government's control after Russia invaded the country in 2022.

== Flag of the head of state ==
Throughout the history of Ukraine, various heads of state have used different flags. The designs differ according to the historical era they were used in and in accordance with the political scene in Ukraine at the time. The first flag to be used by a head of state of Ukraine was that of Pavlo Skoropadskyi. A standard for the President of the Ukrainian People's Republic in exile appeared around 1930. The current design, the flag of the president of Ukraine, was adopted in 1999. In 2022, the president of Ukraine used a variant where the left side of the blue upper-half contains the yellow Tryzub.

Personal standard of the Hetman of Ukraine (1918)

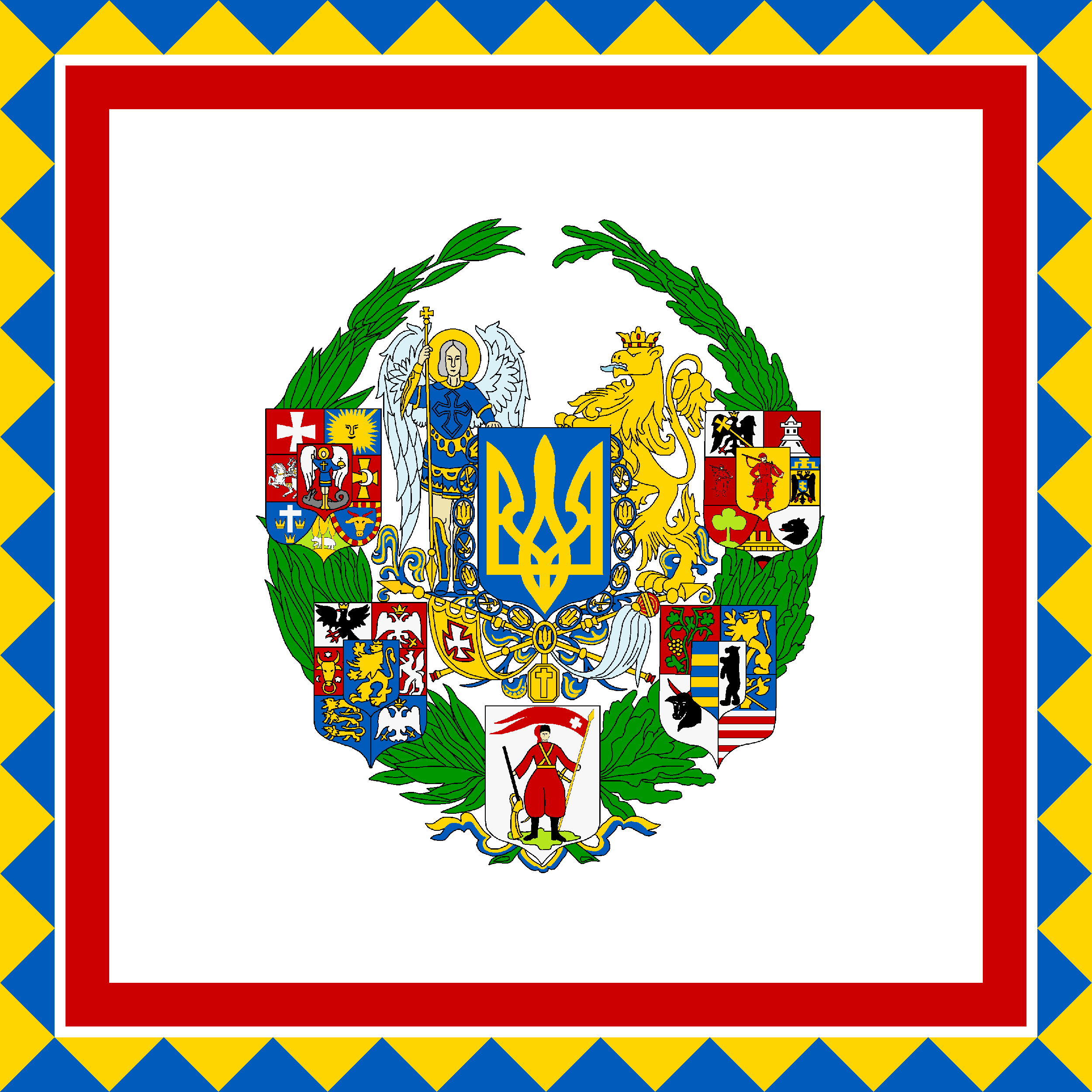
Standard of the President of the Ukrainian People's Republic in exile

Presidential standard

== Military flags ==
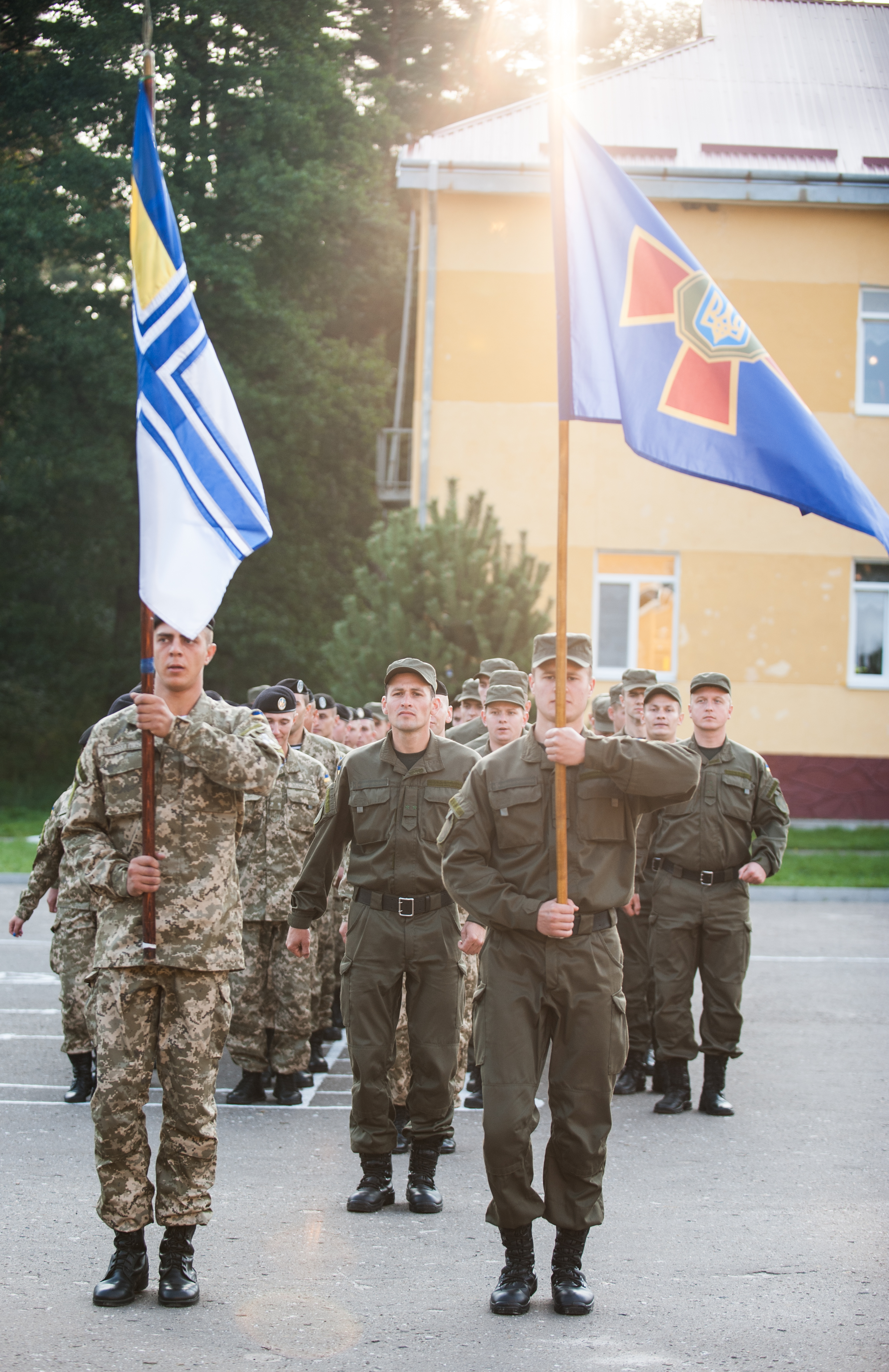
Navy and National Guard flags being flown during a military parade

Armed Forces

Ground Forces

Air Force

National Guard

Navy

Sea Guard

State Border Guard

Special Operations Forces

Marine Corps

Air Assault Forces

=== Historical ===
Naval Ensign
1917

1918–1921

1918

1992

1993

1994–1997

1997–2006
Naval Jack
1918–1921

1992

== See also ==
- List of Ukrainian flags
- Flags of the regions of Ukraine
- Coat of arms of Ukraine
- National colours of Ukraine
- State symbols of the President of Ukraine
