= List of Ukrainian flags =

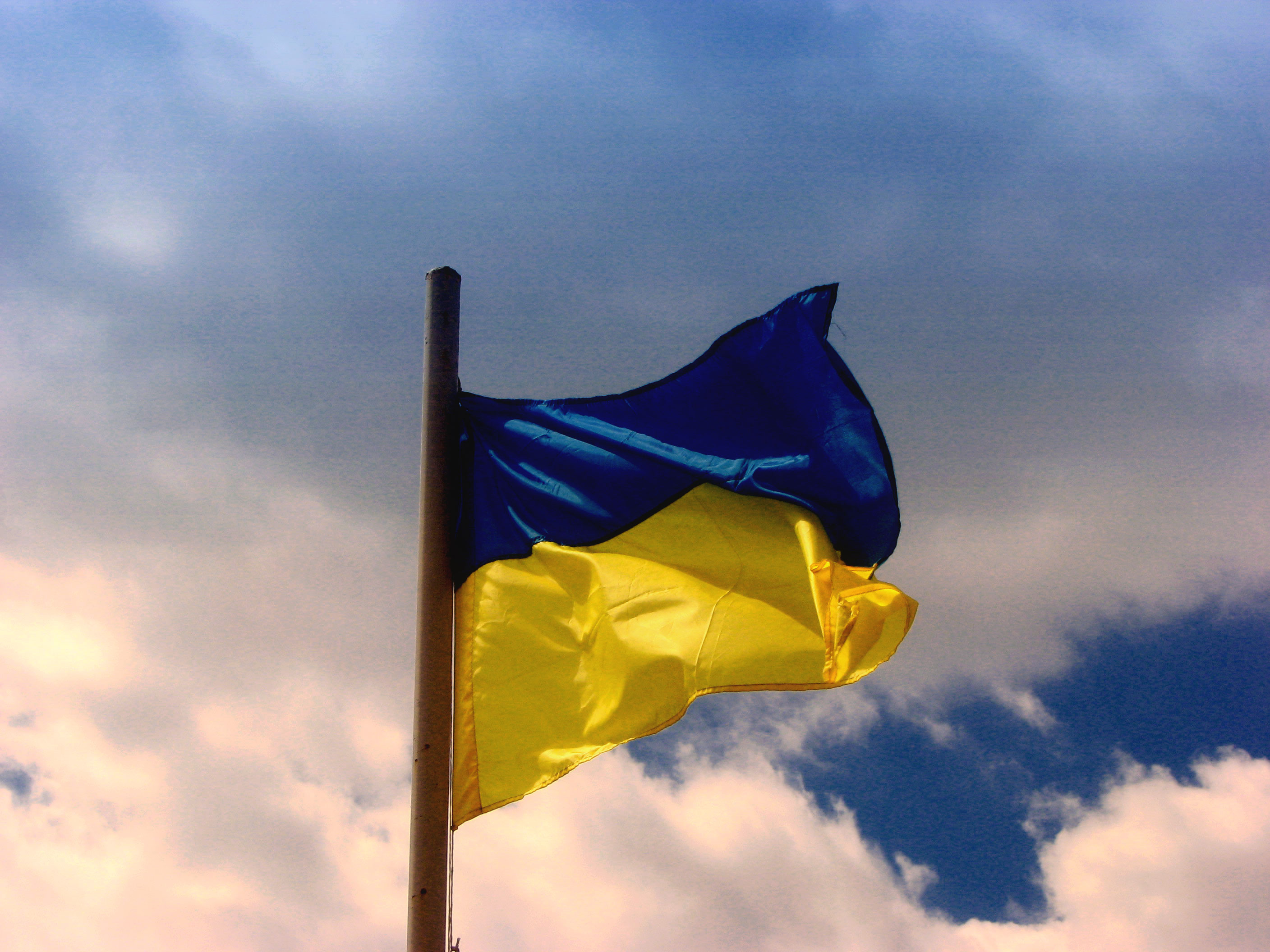
The national flag of Ukraine in flagpole

The following is a list of flags of Ukraine.

== State flag ==
Flag	Date	Use	Description
	1918–1921; 1992–present	National flag, civil and state ensign, and naval jack	Two horizontal stripes of blue (top) and yellow (bottom). The flag was originally used during the revolutions of 1848.
	1918–1921; 1992–present	Vertical variant of national flag	
	1991–1992	State flag and naval jack	Two stripes of blue (top) and yellow (bottom). The flag was originally used during the revolutions of 1848.

== Presidential Standard ==
Flag	Date	Use	Description
	1999	Presidential standard of Ukraine	The golden tryzub (trident), within a golden border made of leaves, on a blue field.

== Military flags ==
=== Flags of service branches ===
Flag	Date	Use	Description
	2006–present	Flag of the Ministry of Defence	A raspberry color field with the emblem of the Ministry of Defence in the center.
	2006–present	Flag of the General Staff of the Ukrainian Armed Forces	A raspberry color field with the emblem of the General Staff in the center.
	2006–present	Flag of the Armed Forces	A raspberry color field with the emblem of the Armed Forces in the center.
	2006–present	Flag of the Ground Forces	A raspberry color field with the emblem of the Ground Forces in the center.
	2006–present	Flag of the Navy	A blue cross with the national flag located in the canton.
	2006–present	Flag of the Air Force	A blue field with the emblem of the Air Force in the center.
	2017–present	Flag of the Air Assault Forces	A maroon field with the emblem of the Air Assault Forces in the center.
	2017–present	Flag of the Special Operations Forces	A grey field with the emblem of the Special Operations Forces in the center.
	2023–present	Flag of the Marine Corps	A teal field with a dark blue cross and the emblem of the Marine Corps in the center.
	2024–present	Flag of the Unmanned Systems Forces	

=== Command Standards ===
Flag	Name
	Standard of the Minister of Defense
	Standard of the Chief of the General Staff
	Standard of the Commander-in-Chief of Ukrainian Ground Forces
	Standard of the Commander-in-Chief of Ukrainian Air Force
	Standard of the Commander-in-Chief of Ukrainian Navy
	Standard of the Commander-in-Chief of National Guard
	Standard of the Head of Border Guard
	Standard of Ukrainian DSNS Head
	Ukrainian Department of the State Guard Head Standard
	Standard of Ukrainian Security Service Head
	Standard of the Minister of Internal Affairs of Ukraine

== Maritime flags ==
Flag	Date	Use	Description
	2006–	Naval ensign of Ukraine	Blue cross with a miniature Ukrainian flag in the upper hoist corner.
	1997–	Search and rescue ships	
	1997–	Auxiliary ships	
	2001–	Sea Guard ensign of Ukraine	Green cross with a miniature Ukrainian flag in the upper hoist corner.
	1993–	Sea Guard jack of Ukraine	
	1918–	Pennant	Blue cross.
	2001–	Sea Guard pennant	Green cross with a miniature Ukrainian flag in the upper hoist corner.
	N/A	Red Cross for hospital ships	Red cross.

=== Naval flags ===
Flag	Date	Use	Description
	1992–1997	Naval jack of Ukraine	
	1993–2001	Naval jack of Ukraine	Sea Guard ensign of Ukraine
	1918, 1992–present	Naval ensign of Ukraine	Blue cross with a miniature Ukrainian flag in the upper hoist corner.
	N/A	Naval ensign of Ukraine	Blue cross with a miniature Ukrainian flag in the upper hoist corner.
	1994–2006	Naval ensign of Ukraine	Blue cross.

=== Personal naval flags ===
Flag	Date	Use
	April 7, 1997 –	President of Ukraine.
	April 7, 1997 –	Flag of the Chief of the General Staff of the Armed Forces.
	April 7, 1997 –	Flag of the Chief of Staff of the Navy.
	April 7, 1997 –	Ukrainian Minister of Defence flag at sea.
	January 19, 1999 –	Ukrainian Navy Commander's flag.
	January 19, 1999 –	Ukrainian Naval Region Commander's flag.
	January 19, 1999 –	Ukrainian Navy Ship Formation or Group flag.
	January 19, 1999 –	Ukrainian Navy Commander of Ship Group flag.

==== Former flags ====
Flag	Date	Use
	April 7, 1997 – January 19, 1999	Ukrainian Navy Ship Formation or Group flag.
	April 7, 1997 – January 19, 1999	Ukrainian Navy Commander's flag.
	April 7, 1997 – January 19, 1999	Flag of Deputy Commander of the Navy.
	April 7, 1997 – January 19, 1999	Ukrainian Naval Region Commander's flag.

== Government and non-military security forces ==
Flag	Date	Use	Description
	2002	State Border Guard Service of Ukraine	
	2002	Security Service of Ukraine	
	2008	Special Communications Service	
	2002	Internal Troops	Blue field with Internal Troops emblem in the center.
	2014	National Guard	Blue field with National Guard emblem in the center.
	2016	State Emergency Service	White field with flag of Ukraine in the canton and State Emergency Service emblem in the center.
	2003	Customs Service	
	2003	Anti-Monopoly Committee	
	2004	State Nuclear Regulatory Inspectorate	
	2003	State Statistics Service	
	2006	State Service for Financial Monitoring	
	2003	State Reserve Agency	
	2003	Treasury of Ukraine	
	2016	State Service for Transportation Safety	

== Flags of Ukrainian regions ==
=== Flags of oblasts ===
Flag	Date	Use	Description
	2000	Flag of Poltava Oblast	Yellow Cossack cross on a blue field
	1998	Flag of Cherkasy Oblast	Oblast coat of arms on blue field
	1999	Flag of Kyiv Oblast	
	2000	Flag of Chernihiv Oblast	
	2000	Flag of Sumy Oblast	Oblast coat of arms on blue field
	2003	Flag of Zhytomyr Oblast	
	1997	Flag of Vinnytsia Oblast	
	2002	Flag of Khmelnytskyi Oblast	
	2001	Flag of Lviv Oblast	
	2001	Flag of Ivano-Frankivsk Oblast	
	2003	Flag of Ternopil Oblast	
	2001	Flag of Chernivtsi Oblast	
	2009	Flag of Zakarpattia Oblast	
	2004	Flag of Volyn Oblast	
	2005	Flag of Rivne Oblast	
	1998	Flag of Kirovohrad Oblast	
	1999	Flag of Kharkiv Oblast	Oblast coat of arms on crimson field
	1999	Flag of Donetsk Oblast	
	1998	Flag of Luhansk Oblast	Oblast coat of arms in top hoist corner, surrounded by seventeen yellow and fourteen white stars
	2002	Flag of Dnipropetrovsk Oblast	
	2026	Flag of Mykolaiv Oblast	
	2002	Flag of Odesa Oblast	
	2001	Flag of Kherson Oblast	
	2001	Flag of Zaporizhzhia Oblast	

=== Flags of cities with special status ===
Flag	Date	Use	Description
	1995	Flag of Kyiv	Archangel Michael, holding a flaming sword and a shield.
	2000	Flag of Sevastopol	Seal of the city on a red field.

=== Flags of other cities ===
Flag	Date	Use	Description
	1995	Flag of Cherkasy	
	2008	Flag of Chernihiv	
	1992	Flag of Chernivtsi	
	2001	Flag of Konotop	
	1995	Flag of Ivano-Frankivsk	
	1997	Flag of Khmelnytskyi	
	1996	Flag of Kropyvnytskyi	
	1991	Flag of Lviv	
	2007	Flag of Lutsk	
	1998	Flag of Bila Tserkva	
	1996	Flag of Poltava	
	1993	Flag of Rivne	
	2000	Flag of Sumy	
	1993	Flag of Ternopil	
	1993	Flag of Vinnytsia	
	1990	Flag of Uzhhorod	
	2007	Flag of Zhytomyr	

== Historical flags ==
=== Kingdom of Galicia–Volhynia ===
Flag	Date	Use	Description
	1119–1349		

=== Cossack Hetmanate ===
Flag	Date	Use	Description
	1649–1764	Flag of the Cossack Hetmanate	

=== Ukraine (1917–1921) ===
Flag	Date	Use	Description
	1917–1918	Flag of the Ukrainian People's Republic (unofficial)	
	1918–1921	Flag of the Ukrainian People's Republic, the West Ukrainian People's Republic and the Ukrainian State	
	1918–1920	Flag of the Lemko-Rusyn People's Republic	
	1919	Flag of Svyryd Kotsur's Dnipro Division and the Chyhyryn Soviet Republic	
	1918–1920	Flag of the Makhnovshchina	

==== Maritime flags ====
Flag	Date	Use	Description
	1918	Naval flag	
	1918	Naval flag of the Ukrainian State	
	1918–1921	Naval flag of the Ukrainian State and the Ukrainian People's Republic	
	September 17, 1918	Naval standard of the Hetman of Ukraine	
	September 17, 1918	Hetman as the Admiral	
	September 17, 1918	Flag of a member of the Hetman family in the admiral rank	
	September 17, 1918	Flag of the Black Sea Fleet Commander	
	September 17, 1918	Flag of the War Minister	
	September 17, 1918	Flag of the Marine Minister	
	September 17, 1918	Flag of Comrade Marine Minister	
	September 17, 1918	Flag of the Chief of the Naval Staff	
	September 17, 1918	Flag of the Chief of the General Naval Staff	
	September 17, 1918	Flag of the Chief of the Marine General Headquarters	
	September 17, 1918	Flag of the General Commander of the Naval Forces	
	September 17, 1918	Flag of the Chief Commandant of the ports of the Black and Azov Seas	
	September 17, 1918	Flag of the Port Commandant	
	September 17, 1918	Flag of the Ambassador of the Ukrainian State	
	September 17, 1918	Flag of the Messengers (heads of diplomatic missions)	
	September 17, 1918	Flag of the Consul General, Consul and Vice-Consul	
	September 17, 1918	Rear admiral	
	September 17, 1918	Vice admiral	
	September 17, 1918	Admiral	
	1918	Naval jack	

==== Royal family standards ====
Flag	Date	Use	Description
	1918	Personal standard of Pavlo Skoropadskyi	
	1918	Royal standard of the Hetman of Ukraine (land use only)	
	1918	Royal standard of the Wife of the Hetman of Ukraine (See Oleksandra Skoropadska)	
	1918	Royal standard of the Prince of the Hetman of Ukraine	
	1918	Royal standard of the Princess of the Hetman of Ukraine	

== Foreign flags ==
Flag	Date	Use	Description
	1569–1587	Flag of the Polish–Lithuanian Commonwealth	Most Ukrainian territories were under the rule of the Polish–Lithuanian Commonwealth after the Union of Lublin.
	1587–1629	Flag of the Polish–Lithuanian Commonwealth	Most Ukrainian territories were under the rule of the Polish–Lithuanian Commonwealth after the Union of Lublin.
	1804–1867	Flag of the Austrian Empire	Most of Western Ukraine was a part of the Austrian Empire after the partitions of Poland.
	1772–1849	Flag of Galicia and Lodomeria	Austrian regional flags of the regions populated by Ukrainians
	1849–1890	Flag of Galicia and Lodomeria	Austrian regional flags of the regions populated by Ukrainians
	1890–1918	Flag of Galicia and Lodomeria	Austrian regional flags of the regions populated by Ukrainians
	1696–1917	Flag of the Russian Empire	Most Ukrainian territories were under the rule of the Russian Empire after 1764.
	1858–1896	Flag of the Russian Empire	Most Ukrainian territories were under the rule of the Russian Empire after 1764.
	1919–1929	Flag of the Ukrainian Soviet Socialist Republic	Each Soviet republic had its own flag.
	1929–1937	Flag of the Ukrainian Soviet Socialist Republic	Each Soviet republic had its own flag.
	1937–1950	Flag of the Ukrainian Soviet Socialist Republic	Each Soviet republic had its own flag.
	1950–1991	Flag of the Ukrainian Soviet Socialist Republic	Each Soviet republic had its own flag.
	1941–1944	Reichskommissariat Ukraine	Flag of Nazi Germany used during the Nazi occupation times.

== Other flags ==
Flag	Date	Use	Description
	1930s–present	Flag of the Organisation of Ukrainian Nationalists (Melnyk's) (unofficial until 1955)	Tryzub (trident) on a blue field
	1941–present	Flag of the Organisation of Ukrainian Nationalists (Bandera's) and Ukrainian Insurgent Army	Horizontal bicolor of black and red
	1946–1992	Flag of the Ukrainian ethnic minority in SFR Yugoslavia	Horizontal bicolour of blue and yellow with a yellow-bordered red star at the flag's center
