= Coat of arms of Kropyvnytskyi =

Versions
- Lesser coat of arms
- Armiger: Kropyvnytskyi
- Adopted: 28 February 1996

The coat of arms of Kropyvnytskyi is one of the city's symbols reflecting its past and the controversies of its history.

== Current coat of arms ==
The current coat of arms exists in two forms: the coat of arms proper and the so-called "big" coat of arms.

Its basic element is a cartouche-decorated Spanish shield bearing the symbols found on the current flag of Kirovohrad and topped with a golden mural crown. The shield follows the colours of the flag and is divided into three parts by a reversed dark blue pall, the first and the second fields being yellow and the third being crimson. Overall there is a yellow six-bastioned fort one point up superimposed by the red monogram of St. Elizabeth.

The big coat of arms of Kropyvnytskyi adds to this two supporters: silver storks set on the compartment made up of four wheat ears and a dark blue scroll with a motto in Ukrainian: "З миром і добром" (English "With peace and good").

The composition of the shield uses the elements found on the old coat of arms of Yelisavetgrad (see below). The golden colour symbolizes the affluence and the fertility of local lands, while crimson one is the traditional colour of Ukrainian cossacks to whom the lands of present-day Kropyvnytskyi once belonged. Three dark blue bands are said to symbolize the junction of three rivers: Inhul, Suhokliya and Bianka in whose vicinity the precursor of the city, Fortress of St. Elizabeth was founded. The latter is represented on the coat of arms by means of the golden six-bastioned fort with black rim. The red monogram of St. Elizabeth is directly influenced by the one of Elizabeth of Russia depicted on the previous emblem of the city. The silver storks are allegoric figures hinting at the personality of cossack Stepan Leleka ('leleka', "лелека" is a Ukrainian for "a stork"), the founder of zymivnyk (settlement) Lelekivka, now within the city boundaries. A mural crown is a usual element for the regional centre coats of arms in Ukraine.

The coat of arms of Kropyvnytskyi can be blazoned in the following way:

- ARMS: Per Pall reversed Azure Or and Gules (Crimson), a six-bastioned Fort, axis crosswise, Or fimbriated Sable, overall a Monogram of St. Elizabeth Gules.
- CREST: a Mural Crown Or.
- SUPPORTERS: On either side a Stork Argent beaked Gules all resting on a Scroll Azure and four Ears of Wheat Or.
- MOTTO: 'З ДОБРОМ І МИРОМ' – With peace and good.

The coat of arms was designed by the architect and heraldry expert Vitaliy Kryvenko and adopted by the Kropyvnytskyi City Hall on 28 February 1996.

== Previous designs ==
=== Coat of arms of Yelisavetrgad ===
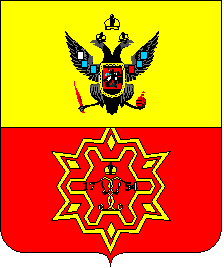
Coat of arms of Yelisavetgrad

The first city's coat of arms ever was adopted by Yelisavetrgrad City Hall on 6 April 1845.

It was a French shield parted horizontally with a yellow field above bearing the Minor State Seal of the Russian Empire and a red field below bearing the yellow contour of the six-bastioned Fort of St. Elizabeth with her personal monogram inside between the figures "17" and "54" which meant the year of the fortress' foundation.

The coat of arms of Yelisavetgrad could be blazoned in the following way: Per fesse Or and Gules, in chief a two-headed eagle displayed Sable gorged with Order of Saint Andrew and an Escutcheon Gules St. George proper mounted and defeating the Serpent, charged on wings with Arms of Astrakhan, Siberia, Georgia, Finland, Kyiv-Vladimir-Novgorod, Taurica, Poland and Kazan, ensigned by three imperial crowns, in base a six-bastioned Fort, axis crosswise, Gules fimbriated Or, on a Fort Gules a Monogram of Elizabeth of Russia accompanied by "17" and "54" Or.

=== Bernhard von Koehne's project ===
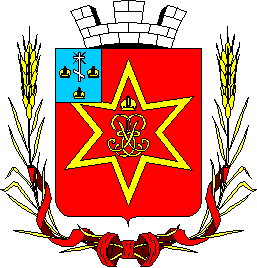
Coat of arms of Yelisavetgrad (Bernhard von Koehne's unadopted project)

In the second half of the 19th century Yelisavetgrad's authorities got the proposal of the then Head of the Arms Division (Heraldry Department) Bernhard Karl von Koehne to change the city's coat of arms. The new project had a red French shield with a yellow contour of the six-bastioned Fort of St. Elizabeth (now much simplified and more resembling a six-pointed mullet) and the escutcheon of the Kherson Province (to which Yelisavetgrad belonged) in the canton. The shield was topped with a silver mural crown and surrounded by two golden ears of wheat entwined with a red ribbon of the Order of St. Alexander. It was never adopted by the city authorities.

Bernhard von Koehne's project could be blazoned in the following way: Gules a six-bastioned Fort, axis crosswise, Gules fimbriated Or, in Canton Azure a "Russian" Cross radiant Argent between three Imperial Crowns Or, ensigned with Mural Crown Argent.

=== Soviet emblem ===
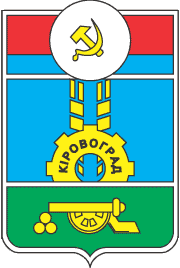
Soviet emblem of Kirovohrad

The coat of arms of Soviet Kirovohrad was adopted on 14 January 1969.

Technically this totally new symbol of the city wasn't a real coat of arms designed according to the principles of heraldry. The emblem looked like a French shield of dark blue colour with silver rim and bearing a golden stylized ear of wheat superimposed with the half of the golden cog-wheel. The chief of the shield (as well rimmed with silver) had two stripes: a dark blue one (2/3 of the chief) and a red one, and was superimposed with a silver circle bearing golden hammer and a sickle crossed diagonally. The base of the shield was green with silver rim and golden cannon with three golden balls.

The emblem utilized well-known Soviet symbols. The chief followed the colours of the UkrSSR flag and bore the elements of the USSR coat of arms. The ear of wheat and cog-wheel spoke about the agroindustrial character of Kirovohrad's economy. The cannon with balls symbolized the past of the city.

One could try to blazon the emblem in the following way: Azure fimbriated Argent an Ear of Wheat Or overall Half of Cog-Wheel Or, on Chief Gules and Azure also fimbriated Argent a Plate with a Hammer and a Sickle both Or in saltire, on Base Vert fimbriated Argent a Cannon Or with three Cannon Balls Or.

In order to comply with decommunization laws Kirovohrad was renamed in July 2016 by the Ukrainian parliament to Kropyvnytskyi.
