= Flag of the President of Ukraine =

President of Ukraine
- Proportion: 1:1
- Adopted: November 29, 1999

The flag (standard) of the president of Ukraine (Ukrainian: Прапор (штандарт) Президента України, romanized: Prapor (shtandart) Prezydenta Ukrainy) is the official flag of the president of Ukraine.

The presidential flag of Ukraine was confirmed by the decree of the president of Ukraine as of November 29, 1999 and used during their inaugural ceremony, during which the chairman of the Constitutional Court of Ukraine presents it to the president. On delivering his inaugural address, the president takes a special seat at the session hall of the Verkhovna Rada next to which the president's colour is placed.

== Design ==
The president's colour represents a blue square cloth bearing a golden trident (tryzub), the coat of arms of Ukraine, in the center: the Sign of Prince Volodymyr the Great's State, edged with gold vegetative ornament. Two-sided silken cloth was embroidered with the use of computer technologies. One side of the president's colour bears more than a million stitches of pure gold and yellow gold threads. The embroidered trident has volume due to a special lining. The flags of the British monarch and the US and French presidents are also made with the use of the same technology.

== See also ==
- Flag of Ukraine
- State symbols of the president of Ukraine
