= Day of the National Flag (Ukraine) =

Flag holiday in Ukraine

Day of the National Flag День Державного прапора України
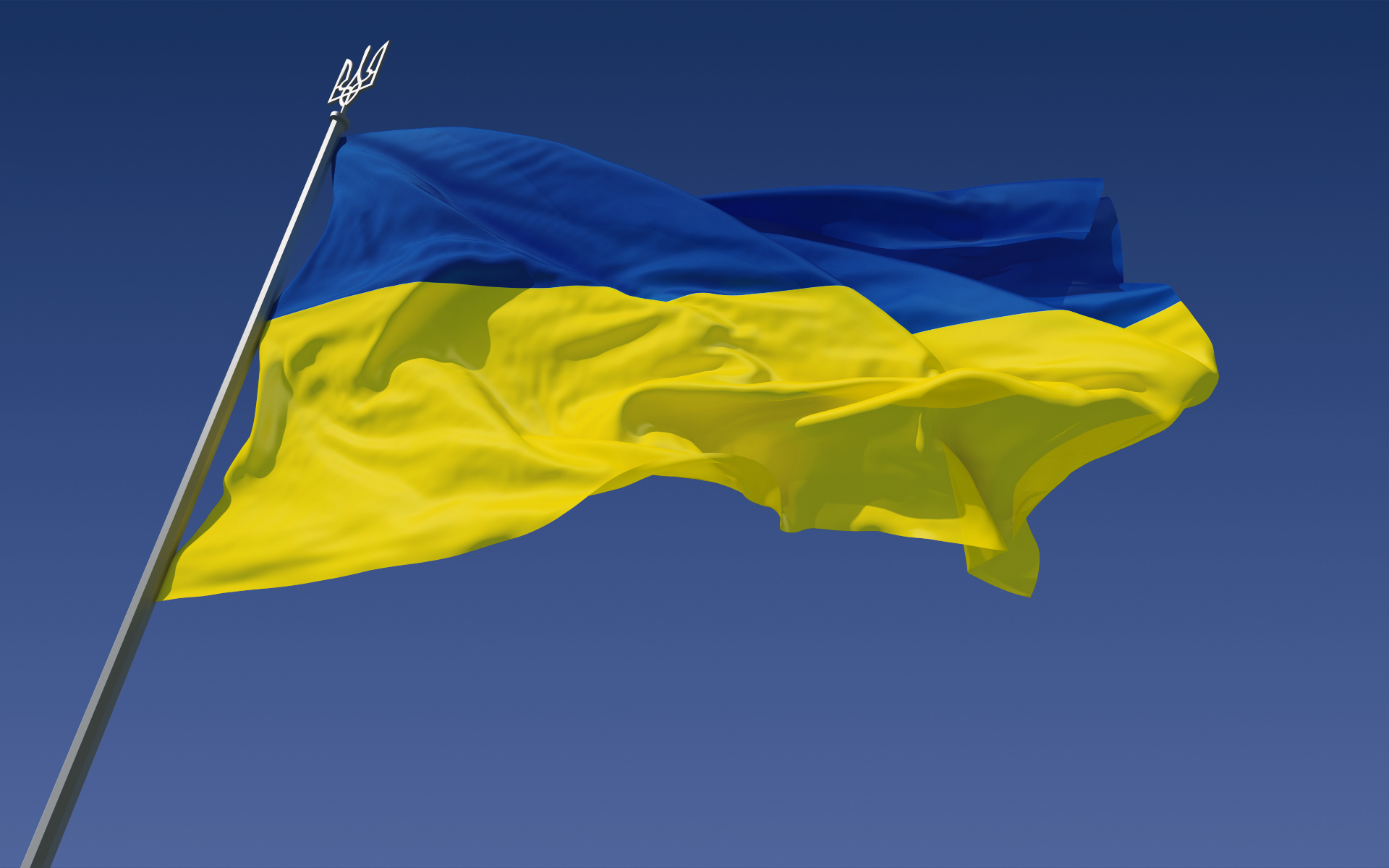
- Flag of Ukraine
- Observed by: Ukraine
- Date: August 23
- Next time: 23 August 2026
- Frequency: Annual
- First time: 2004

23 August is celebrated as the Day of the National Flag (Ukrainian: День Державного прапора України, romanized: Den Derzhavnoho prapora Ukrainy, lit. 'Day of the National Flag of Ukraine') in Ukraine; since in 2004.

Since 1992 Independence Day of Ukraine is celebrated on 24 August.

== History ==
The yellow-and-blue flag is first verifiably documented in Ukraine on 25 June 1848 when two blue and yellow banners were hung on the Lviv (then named Lemberg and situated in the Austrian Empire) Townhall (Rathaus). It is unknown who hang the banners and the Austrian authorities dissociated themselves from this action, as did the Supreme Ruthenian Council (Ukrainian political organization). The banners hung for almost a week. At the request of the Supreme Ruthenian Council, on 15 May 1849 a yellow-and-blue flag hang again on the Rathaus, this time for one day.

The first ceremonial raising of the yellow-and-blue Ukrainian flag in modern times took place on 24 July 1990 at the flagstaff of the Kyiv City Council, one-and-a-half years before the flag was officially adopted as the National flag of Ukraine. At the time Ukraine (as the Ukrainian SSR) was part of the Soviet Union since 1922. 24 July was thus previously marked as National Flag Day in Kyiv.

On 23 August 1991, after the failure of the August 1991 Soviet coup attempt, a group of people's deputies brought a blue-yellow Ukrainian flag into the session hall of the Verkhovna Rada (then the parliament of the Ukrainian SSR of the Soviet Union, now the national parliament of Ukraine). The consecration of the flag was conducted by priest Petro Boyko of the Ukrainian Autocephalous Orthodox Church. This flag, like a relic, is now solemnly kept under glass in the Verkhovna Rada museum. The next day, Ukraine declared independence. On 4 September 1991 the flag was raised above the Verkhovna Rada building.

The current official flag of Ukraine was approved by the Verkhovna Rada on 28 January 1992.

The official "Day of the National Flag" was created 23 August 2004 through a decree of President of Ukraine Leonid Kuchma, "On the Day of the State Banner of Ukraine" No. 987/2004. A corresponding picture was painted on the wall of the Verkhovna Rada. In 2009 President Viktor Yushchenko amended President Kuchma's 2004 decree, founding the current annual flag-raising ceremonies throughout Ukraine on August 23.
