= Flags of the Makhnovshchina =

Anarchist and Socialist Flag Designs

Makhnovshchina
- Black flag of Anarchy
- Adopted: c. 1905
- Relinquished: c. 1921

The flags of the Makhnovshchina consisted of a number of different black and red flags, each emblazoned with anarchist and socialist slogans.

== Design ==
The Makhnovshchina flew multiple variations of the black and red flags during the Ukrainian War of Independence. These flags often carried anarchist and socialist slogans, or the name of the insurgent unit they represented, embroidered in white on the black flags and in gold on the red flags. In his memoirs, the Makhnovist chief-of-staff Viktor Bilash wrote about a number of the slogans used on the flags of the Makhnovshchina, including:

- "Always with the oppressed against the oppressors" (Army)
- "War on the palaces, peace to the cottages" (Army)
- "The emancipation of the workers is the affair of the workers themselves!" (Army)
- "Power generates parasites. Long live Anarchy!" (Soviet)
- "All power to the local soviets!" (Soviet)

== History ==
The black flag had been used by Ukrainian anarchists since the 1905 Revolution, when a militant organization known as the Black Banner carried out a number of attacks in the region. The Union of Poor Peasants also used their own variation of the black flag, which was emblazoned with the words: "Always with the oppressed against the oppressors". When one of the Union's members, Egor Bondarenko, was due to be hanged, he prophesied that his comrade Nestor Makhno would "hoist again the black flag of Anarchy that our enemies have snatched from us..." During his prison sentence, Makhno himself wrote poetry depicting a peasant revolution breaking out beneath the anarchist black flag.

With the outbreak of the February Revolution, the anarchist black flag was raised once again in Huliaipole, and with the subsequent October Revolution, black flags were flown during anarchist demonstrations in Katerynoslav. According to Makhno, following the invasion of Ukraine by the Central Powers, anarchist banners hung up in Huliaipole were torn down by the "haidymaky" of the Ukrainian People's Army.

When the Insurgent Army was integrated into the Red Army in 1919, the Makhnovists were permitted to retain their black flags. They also made use of their official position within the Soviet power structure to commission their own red flags from the Bolshevik artist A. A. Briantsev.

During the Makhnovist advance against the White movement in October 1919, Volin reported that after a priest had been captured by insurgents, they stripped him of his cassock, which they claimed they intended to use as fabric for a black flag, before shooting him.

On 9 February 1920, after the Southwestern Front of the Red Army attacked the insurgent positions in Huliaipole, the Red units reported that they had seized the insurgent staff's black flag. On 12 December 1920, following an engagement between the Insurgents and the Red Army that had ended in a stalemate, the Red command declared victory after they captured one of the insurgents' black flags.

Decades after the defeat of the Makhnovshchina, Ukrainian Makhnovists raised the black flag once again during World War II, when they took up a partisan struggle against the Nazi occupation.

== Other flags ==
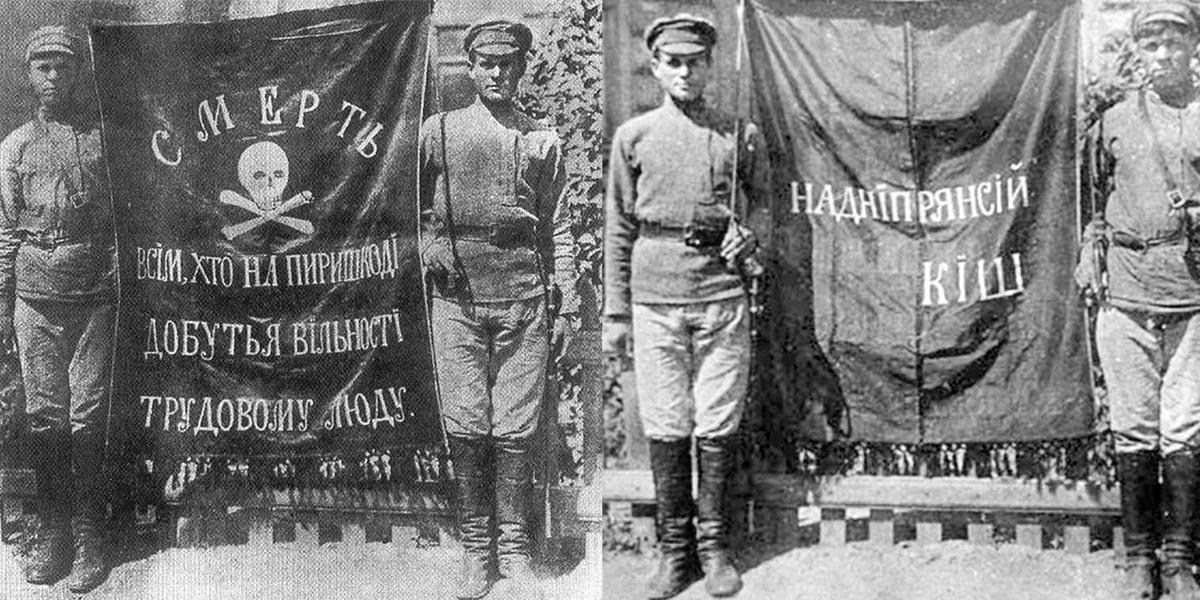
A photo showing the front and back of a flag falsely attributed to the Makhnovists

A photo emblazoned with a skull and crossbones and the motto "Death to all who stand in the way of freedom for the working people" is often attributed to Makhnovists, first in the Soviet Russian book Jewish Pogroms 1917–1921 by Zelman Ostrovsky. But its use by the Makhnovists was categorically denied by Nestor Makhno, who said the photo "does not show Makhnovists at all". The reverse side of this flag reads Naddniprians'kyi kish, roughly translating to the "Dnipro Division," a unit which was under the command of Svyryd Kotsur, the ataman of Chyhyryn.

Various national flags have also been associated with the Makhnovshchina. Following the White offensive in Northern Taurida, a number of Makhnovists found themselves trapped in the region occupied by the Russian Army. Led to believe that Pyotr Wrangel had formed an alliance with the Makhnovists, a number of these isolated insurgents defected to the White movement, flying their black flags alongside the flag of Russia. In contemporary Ukraine, the blue-and-yellow flag of Ukraine has been flown at public events commemorating the Makhnovshchina, depicting Makhno as a figure that fought for the country's independence.

== Gallery ==
One of the flags described by Viktor Bilash, which reads "Power breeds parasites. Long live anarchy!"

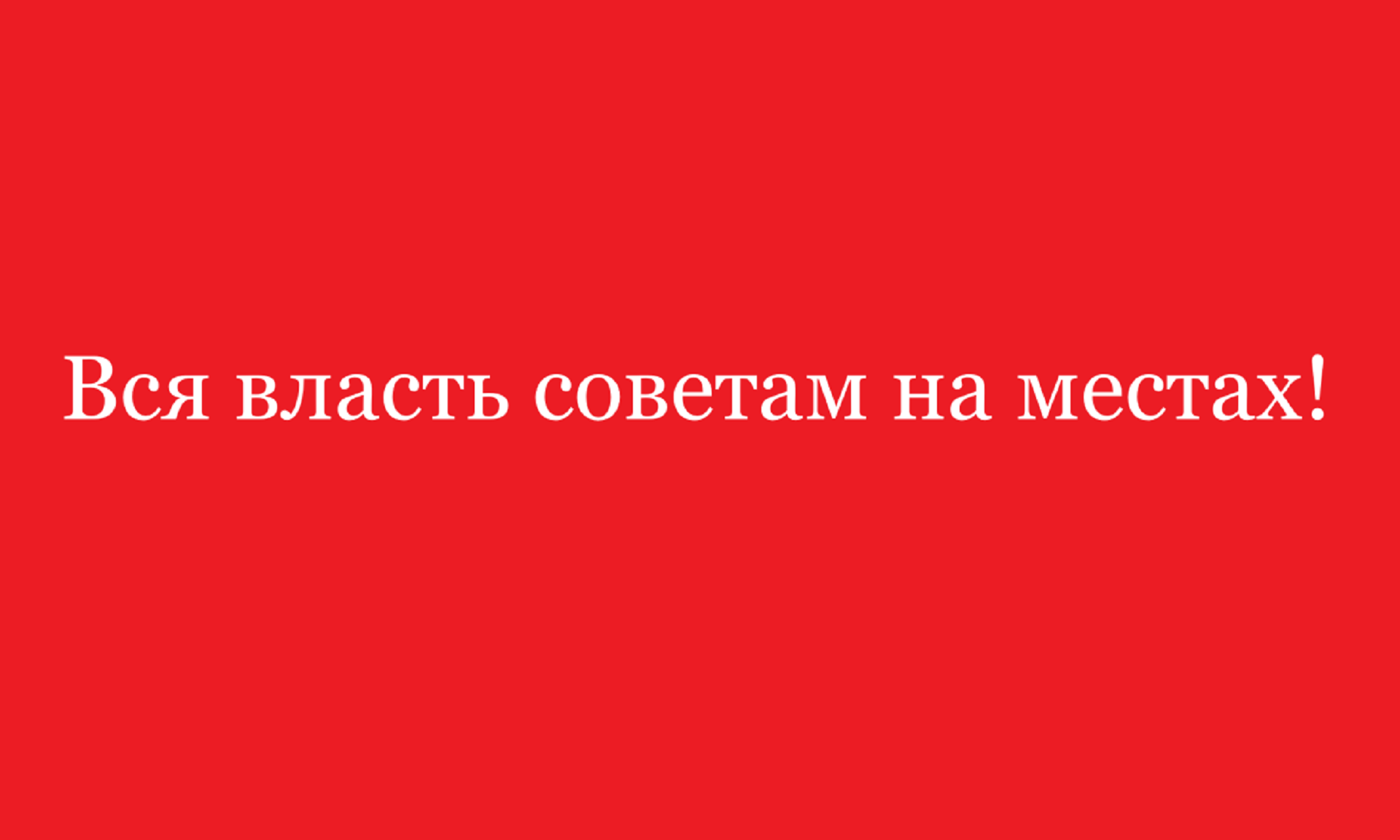
Another flag described by Bilash, which reads "All power to the local soviets!"

Obverse of a flag used by the 2nd Insurgent Regiment of the RIAU, which reads "2nd Consolidated Infantry Regiment of the Insurrectionary Army of Ukraine, Makhnovists"

Reverse of a flag used by the 2nd Consolidated Infantry Regiment of the Revolutionary Insurgent Army of Ukraine which reads "Death to oppressors of workers"

Obverse of the banner attributed to the Makhnovists by Ostrovsky, denied by Makhno, which reads "Death to all who stand in the way of freedom for the working people"

Reverse of the banner attributed to the Makhnovists by Ostrovsky, which reads "Naddniprians'kyi kish" or the "Dnipro Division"

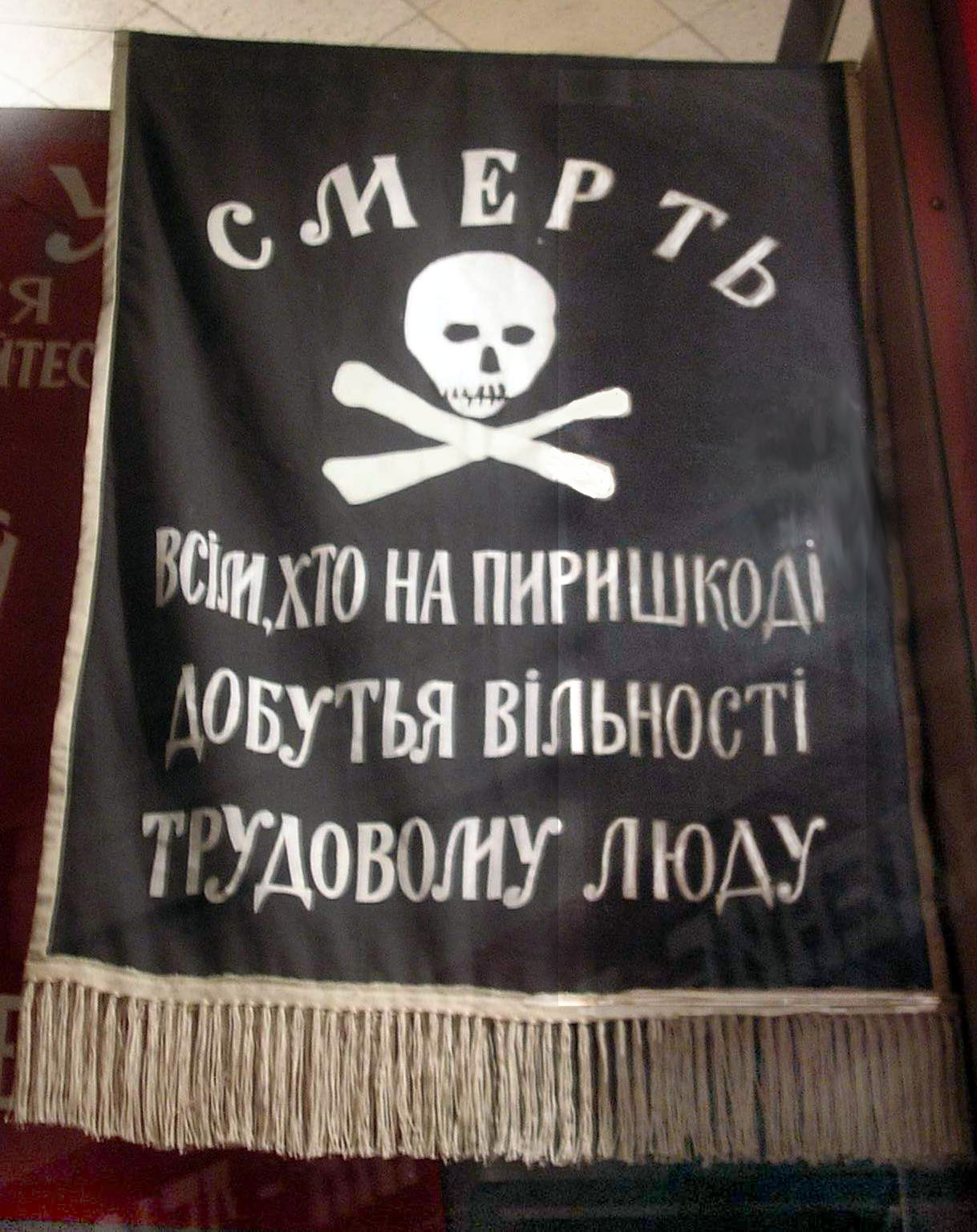
Skull-and-crossbones flag, attributed to the Makhnovists by Ostrovsky, hanging in the Huliaipole district museum

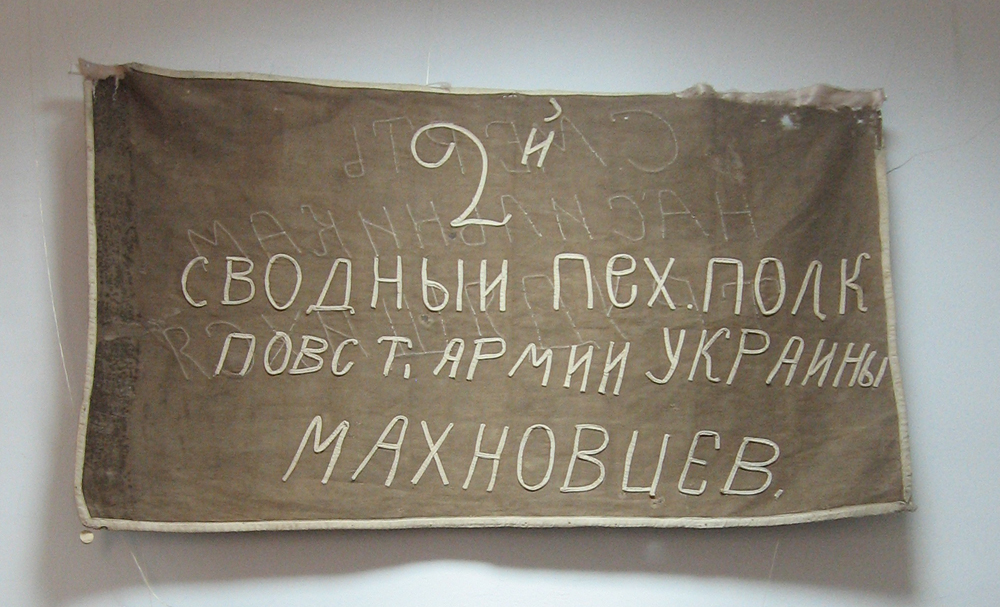
A Flag used by the 2nd Insurgent Regiment of the RIAU

== See also ==
- Flag of Ukraine
- Flag of the Ukrainian Insurgent Army
- Skull and crossbones
- Jolly Roger
- Flag of the Ukrainian Soviet Socialist Republic

== Bibliography ==
- Darch, Colin (2020). Nestor Makhno and Rural Anarchism in Ukraine, 1917-1921. London: Pluto Press. ISBN 9781786805263. OCLC 1225942343.
- Kravets, Yuri (16 June 2019). "Флаги гражданской войны. Армия Н.Махно". Vexillographia (in Russian). Zaporizhzhia: Russian Centre of Vexillology and Heraldry.
- Malet, Michael (1982). Nestor Makhno in the Russian Civil War. London: Palgrave Macmillan. ISBN 978-0-333-25969-6. OCLC 8514426.
- Makhno, Nestor (April–May 1927). "To the Jews of all Countries". Delo truda (23–24).
- Ostrovsky, Zelman Solomonovich (1926). Еврейские погромы, 1918-1921 [Jewish Pogroms 1917–1921]. Moscow: Shkola i kniga. p. 100. OCLC 41219136. Archived from the original on 14 April 2021.
- Patterson, Sean (30 June 2022). ""Death to All Who Stand in the Way of Freedom for the Working People": Anarchy's False Flag". Anarchist Studies.
- Peters, Victor (1970). Nestor Makhno: The Life of an Anarchist. Winnipeg: Echo Books. OCLC 7925080.
- Skirda, Alexandre (2004) [1982]. Nestor Makhno–Anarchy's Cossack: The Struggle for Free Soviets in the Ukraine 1917–1921. Translated by Sharkey, Paul. Oakland: AK Press. ISBN 978-1-902593-68-5. OCLC 60602979.
