= Flag of Kropyvnytskyi =

The flag of Kropyvnytskyi

The flag of Kropyvnytskyi is the city symbol of Kropyvnytskyi, Ukraine and was developed and widely introduced during the last decade of the 20th century.

== Overview ==
The flag has two horizontal bands of yellow, of equal width, separated by a central blue band which splits into a horizontal "Y" shape, the arms of which end at the corners of the hoist side (and roughly follow the flag's diagonals). The Y embraces a red isosceles triangle containing the golden monogram of Elizabeth, empress of Russia within. The width of the pall makes one fifth of the flag.

In blazons the flag of Kropyvnytskyi can be described as "per pall fesswise Or and gules, a fesswise pall azure."

As most of the Ukrainian municipal flags, the ratio of the flag of Kropyvnytskyi is 1:1. It usually has decorative edging and is hoisted on a staff with a cross-bar. In this case the Ukrainian Heraldry Portal prefers to use the term "khoruhva" (Ukrainian "хоругва") which could be translated in English as "a gonfalon".

The flag of Kropyvnytskyi utilizes the symbols found on the city's historical coats of arms and its current one, particularly the colours (with a switch from red to crimson) and the monogram of Elizabeth, empress of Russia. The blue cross is said to symbolize the junction of three rivers: Inhul, Suhokliya and Bianka in whose vicinity the precursor of the city, Fort of St. Elizabeth was founded.

The flag was designed by Vitaliy Kryvenko in the 1st half of the 1990s and adopted by the City Hall on February 28, 1996.
