= Svyryd Kotsur =

Ukrainian insurgent (1890–1920)

- Свирид Коцур
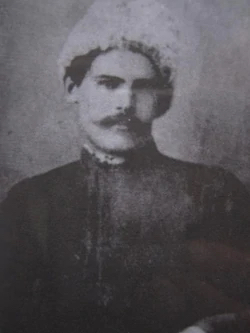
- Born: December 13, 1890; Subotiv, Chyhyrynsky uyezd, Kyiv governorate, Russian Empire
- Died: April 15, 1920 (?); Zamianka, Oleksandriya uyezd, Kherson governorate, Ukrainian Soviet Socialist Republic
- Known for: Chyhyryn Republic

Svyryd Dementiovych Kotsur (Ukrainian: Свирид Дементійович Коцур) (1890–1920?) was a Ukrainian insurgent otaman during the Ukrainian War of Independence. In early 1920 he created the Naddniprians'kyi kish, or Dnipro Division, and declared a short-lived independent Chyhyryn republic.

== Biography ==
Kotsur was born to a peasant family in the village of Subotiv, near Chyhyryn city in the southern part of the Kyiv gubernia. In his youth, Svyryd and his brothers became politically active in the leftist underground. He participated in an anarcho-communist group and a bank robbery in Katerynoslav. Kotsur was responsible for a police shootout that interrupted Nestor Makhno's March 1910 court martial, which injured multiple guards and killed one secret policeman. Though he expected to be hanged, his sentence was commuted to prison labor and was ultimately released during the 1917 February Revolution's amnesty for political prisoners.

From October 16–20, 1917, Kotsur became a delegate to the All-Ukraine Congress of Free Cossacks in Chyhyryn, which called for Ukrainian autonomy and the withdrawal of Russian troops from Ukrainian territory. After the Bolsheviks' peace negotiations with Germany, the German Imperial Army occupied Ukraine between April and November 1918. Kotsur led an armed insurgent campaign in the Chyhyryn area against the Germans. Near the end of the occupation in November, Kotsur's forces managed to briefly drive the Germans out of Chyhyryn. Kotsur allied with many different forces during the Ukrainian Civil War and led the Chyhyryn Soviet Republic during early 1919. He initially aligned his himself with the Bolsheviks against Symon Petliura's Ukrainian People's Army, and from September 1919 to January 1920 with Nestor Makhno's Revolutionary Insurgent Army of Ukraine during the Red Army's absence. Upon the Red Army's return to Ukraine in January 1920, Kotsur's relations with the Bolsheviks soured. Kotsur refused to transfer his troops outside the Chyhyryn area as the Bolsheviks requested. He drowned a delegation of Bolsheviks in a well and shortly thereafter declared an independent Chyhyryn republic. Kotsur's forces successfully defended against a Bolshevik raid in February 1920. However, the Bolsheviks, occupied Chyhyryn by the end of March.

The date and circumstances of Kotsur's death are unclear and opinions range. By the official account, Kotsur was shot shortly after the Bolshevik occupation of Chyhyryn. By other accounts, he survived, absconded to Bulgaria, and faked his own death. After Kotsur's apparent death, his brother Petro continued the fight. In June 1920 a Bolshevik telegram claimed that Petro Kotsur and his associates had been vanquished.

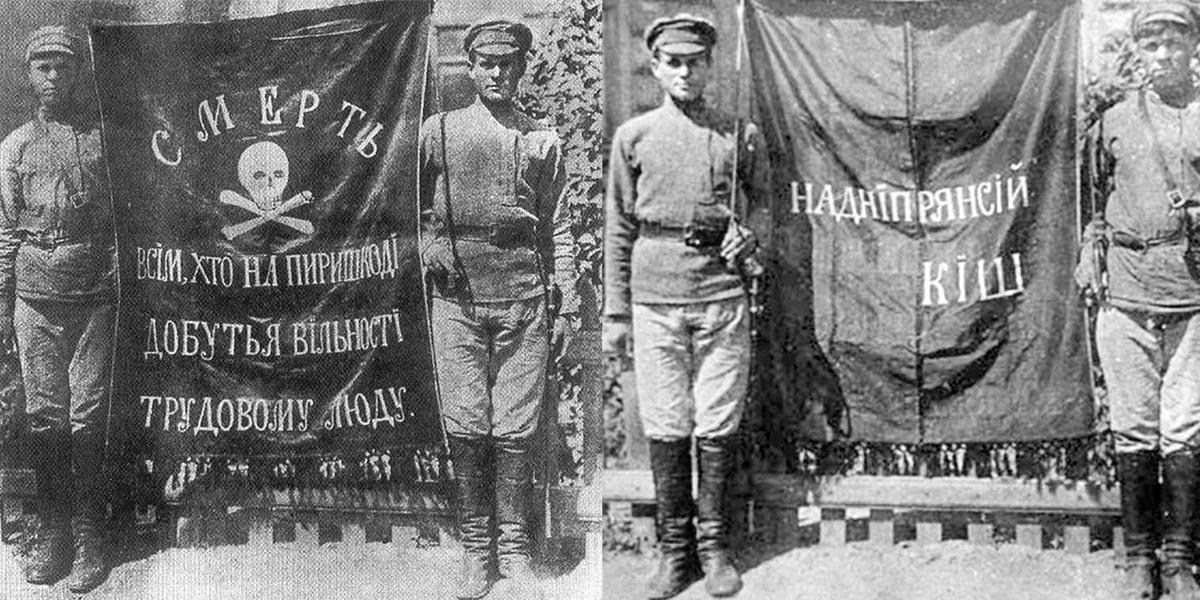
The Kotsur flag, photographed with Bolshevik soldiers, often misattributed to Makhno's army

Kotsur's flag of the Naddniprians'kyi kish has long and erroneously been attributed to Makhno's army. The reverse of this flag bears a skull and crossbones and the slogan "Death to All Who Stand in the Way of Freedom for the Working People."
