= Chyhyryn Soviet Republic =

Soviet republic in Ukraine in 1919

Chyhyryn Soviet Republic Чигиринська Радянська Республіка (Ukrainian)
- 1919
- Flag

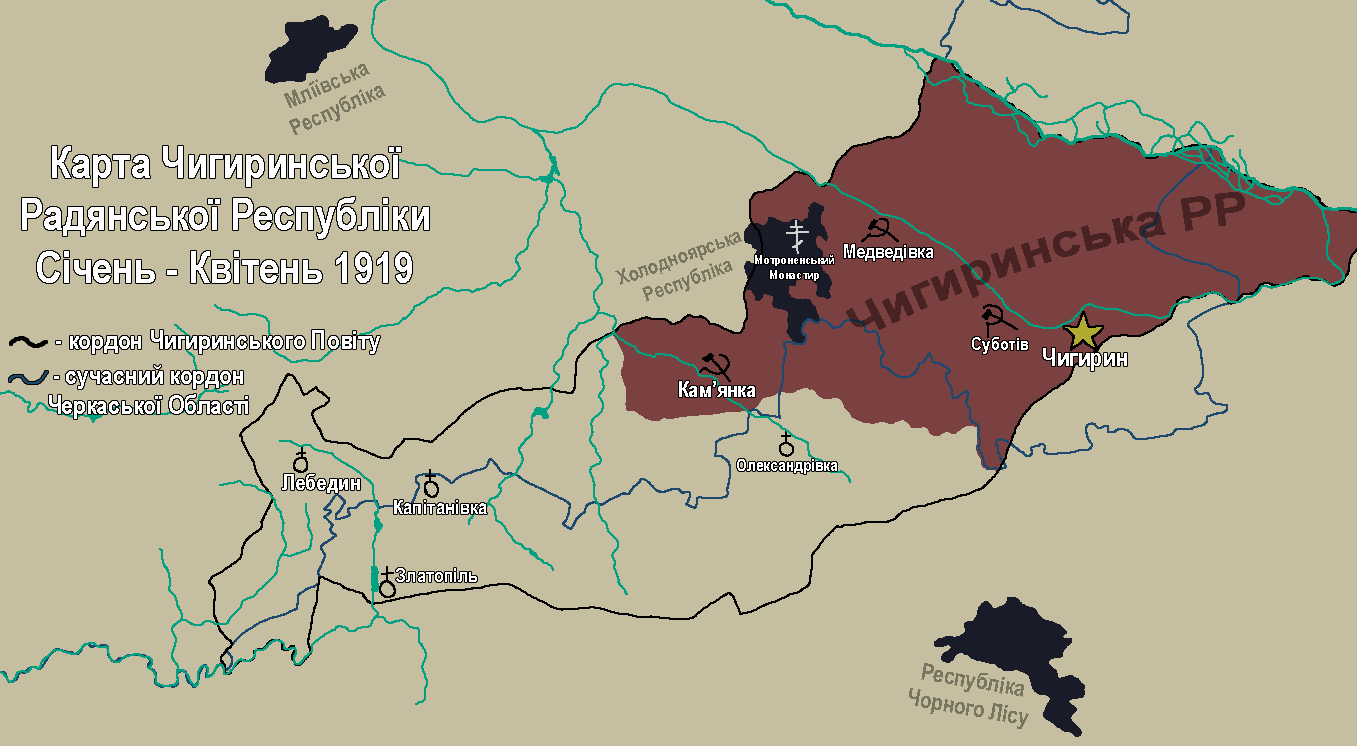
- Status: Unrecognized state
- Capital: Chyhyryn
- Government: Soviet republic
- Chairman/President
  - 1919: Svyryd Kotsur
- Historical era: Ukrainian War of Independence
  - Established: January 1919
  - Disestablished: 1919
Preceded by	Succeeded by
Ukrainian People's Republic	Ukrainian Soviet Socialist Republic; Kholodny Yar Republic
- Today part of: Ukraine

The Chyhyryn Soviet Republic (Ukrainian: Чигиринська Радянська Республіка, romanized: Chyhyrynska Radianska Respublika) was an unrecognised revolutionary state in Ukraine formed during the Ukrainian War of Independence (within the wider Russian Civil War).

== History ==
In early January 1919, Ataman Svyryd Kotsur, commanding the Subotiv rebel detachment which included 600 rebels, occupied the city of Chyhyryn. The Ataman dispersed the administration of the existing directorate in the city and declared the creation of an independent state, the "Chyhyryn Soviet Republic". The head of the republic, and all the rebel forces, was Kotsur.

Kotsur began his rule with class terror. On his orders the bourgeois and government officials were shot. 60 suspicious persons were also arrested in Chyhyryn. Kotsur's detachments carried out punitive actions against kulak villages and landowners' estates as well as arranging contributions, and confiscations, of food for the needs of the revolution.

Due to the robberies of Kotsur's detachments in March 1919, the residents of the villages of Ositnyazhka and Tsybuliv rebelled against the authority of the ataman.

== Governance ==
The main form of government in the republic were free city and village councils. In some settlements, revolutionary committees were created but they did not have real power.

== Territory ==
At the time of the proclamation of the republic, the rebels controlled the territory of Chyhyryn - Kamianka - Subbotov - Yanichi - Novosel'tsy - Ivanovka and several surrounding farms.

== See also ==
- Aftermath of World War I
- Rat (council)
