= List of country subdivision flags in Europe =

This page lists the country subdivision flags in Europe. It is a part of the Lists of country subdivision flags, which is split into continents due to its size.

== Albania ==
=== Counties ===
Flag	Date	Use	Description
	?-Present	Flag of Berat County	White with the county's emblem in the center.
	?-Present	Flag of Durrës County	Yellow and blue with the county's emblem in the center.
	?-Present	Flag of Elbasan County	Green with the county's emblem in the center.
	?-Present	Flag of Korçë County	White with the county's emblem in the center.
	?-Present	Flag of Kukës County	Blue with the county's emblem in the center.
	?-Present	Flag of Tirana County	Light blue with the county's emblem in the center.
	?-Present	Flag of Vlorë County	White with the county's emblem in the center.

== Andorra ==
=== Parishes ===
Flag	Parish	Adopted	Description
	Andorra la Vella		
	Canillo		
	Encamp		
	Escaldes-Engordany		
	La Massana		
	Ordino		
	Sant Julià de Lòria		

== Austria ==
=== States ===
The flags are used with or without the respective coat of arms. Here the versions with coat of arms are shown.

Flag	Date	Use	Description
	1921–	Flag of Burgenland	A horizontal bicolor of red over gold.
	1946–	Flag of Carinthia	A horizontal tricolor of yellow, red and white.
	1954–	Flag of Lower Austria	A horizontal bicolor of blue over gold.
	1921–	Flag of Salzburg	A horizontal bicolor of red over white.
	1960–	Flag of Styria	A horizontal bicolor of white over green.
	1945–	Flag of Tyrol	A horizontal bicolor of white over red.
	1949–	Flag of Upper Austria	A horizontal bicolor of white over red.
	1938–	Flag of Vorarlberg	A horizontal bicolor of red over white.
	1844–	Flag of Vienna	A horizontal bicolor of red over white.

== Belarus ==
=== Regions ===
Flag	Date	Use	Description
	2004–	Flag of Brest Region	Blue with a yellow zoubre (Bison bonasus) on a red stylized tower.
	2005–	Flag of Gomel Region	Green with the coat of arms of Gomel Region in the centre of the obverse.
	2007–	Flag of Grodno Region	Red with the coat of arms of Grodno Region in the centre of the obverse.
	2007–	Flag of Minsk Region	Red with the coat of arms of Minsk Region in the centre of the obverse.
	2001–	Flag of Minsk Municipality	Blue with the 1591 coat of arms of Minsk Municipality in the centre of the obverse.
	2005–	Flag of Mogilev Region	Green with the coat of arms of Mogilev Region in the centre of the obverse.
	2009–	Flag of Vitebsk Region	Green with the coat of arms of Vitebsk Region in the centre of the obverse.

== Belgium ==
Flag	Date	Use	Description
	2015–	Flag of the Brussels-Capital Region	A stylized yellow, white and grey iris on a blue field.
	1973–	Flag of Flanders (Flemish Community and Flemish Region}	Flanders is a Dutch-speaking region in the northern half of Belgium. Or, a lion rampant armed and langued Gules.
	1991–	Flag of Wallonia (French Community and Walloon Region)	Wallonia is a mostly French-speaking region comprising the southern half of Belgium. The flag depicts a red rooster, on a yellow field.
	1990–	Flag of the German-speaking Community	It consists of the white background. In the centre is placed a red lion, that stands on its back legs, have raised its front paws, and put its tongue out. Around it are placed in a circle nine gentiana flowers that have five intense blue petals and white (silver) round centres.

=== Provinces ===
Flag	Province	Adopted	Description
	Antwerp	1997	From historical and heraldical points of views, it was better to stick to the old Brabant tradition of chequered flags. This tradition traces back at least to the insurrection against the absolutism of Filip VI. The association of red, yellow, blue and white from the main colours of Antwerp (red-white), Mechelen (yellow-red) and Turnhout (white-blue) can easily be compared to the historical models.
	East Flanders	1999	Three stripes with proportions 5:6:5, the upper and lower stripes green, the middle stripe alternate white and green with proportions 1:1:1:1:4:1:1, in the fly a black lion with red nails and tongue.
	Flemish Brabant	1996	The flag is a banner of the provincial arms; in practice, the lion is shown dark yellow/orange. The arms o are "Sable a lion or armed and langued gules an escutcheon gules a fess argent, the shield surmuonted by a Ducal coronet and supported by two lions or armed and langued gules on a wrought iron or". The escutcheoh is the coat of arms of Leuven, the capital of the province, but also the capital of the old Duchy of Lotharingia.
	Hainaut		Quarterly, 1. and 4. Or a lion sable armed and langued gules, 2. and 3. Or a lion gules armed and langued azure.
	Liège		Quartered, I gules the perron of Liège or flanked by the letters L and G of the same, II gules a fess argent, III argent three lions rampant vert 2 + 1 crowned or langued and armed gules, IV or five fesses gules, in point or three horns silver and gules 2+1.
	Limburg	1996	The provincial flag of Limburg is white with a red lion with yellow tongue and claws. The lion bears a Ducal coronet and an escutcheon made of ten yellow and red horizontal stripes. It is a banner of the provincial arms.
	Luxembourg	2018	Azure and white horizontal stripes with the crowned red lion
	Namur	1953	The flag of the Province of Namur is made of black and red colours, placed parallel to the hoist, black at hoist.
	Walloon Brabant	1995	A yellow lion on a black triangle, on a yellow background. The upper right and left corners each contain a red rooster. See Flag and coat of arms of Walloon Brabant
	West Flanders	1997	The flag is rectangular (2:3) with a gyronny of six yellow and six blue pieces and a red escutcheon in the middle.

== Bosnia and Herzegovina ==
=== Entities ===
Flag	Date	Use	Description
	1995–2007	Former flag of the Federation of Bosnia and Herzegovina	A vertical tricolour of red (for the Bosnian Croats), white, and green (for the Bosniaks), with a coat of arms on the wide central band on which the green arms and golden fleur-de-lys represents the Bosniaks, and the checked shield the Bosnian Croats. The Constitutional Court of Bosnia and Herzegovina voted against the use of the current flag of the Federation declaring it unconstitutional. On 31 March 2007, the Constitutional Court placed its decision into the "Official Gazette of Bosnia and Herzegovina" officially removing the flag and coat of arms of Federation of Bosnia and Herzegovina.
	1995 – present	Flag of Republika Srpska	A horizontal tricolour of red, blue, and white, very similar to the flag of the Misiones Province in Argentina, reversed flag of Russia, or the flag of Serbia without the coat of arms (with slightly differently coloured shades).

=== Districts ===
Flag	Date	Use	Description
	1998 – present	Flag of Brčko District	Uses the flag of Bosnia and Herzegovina

=== Cantons of the Federation ===
Flag	Date	Use	Description
	1999 –	Flag of Una-Sana Canton	
	2000 –	Flag of Posavina Canton	
	1999 –	Flag of Tuzla Canton	
	2000 –	Flag of Zenica-Doboj Canton	
	2001 –	Flag of Bosnian-Podrinje Canton Goražde	
	2003 –	Flag of Central Bosnia Canton	
	2004 –	Flag of Herzegovina-Neretva Canton	
	1996–1998	Flag of West Herzegovina Canton	Deemed unconstitutional by the Federation Constitutional Court in 1997 because "it only represented one group".
	1999 –	Flag of Sarajevo Canton	
	1996–1997	Flag of Canton 10	Deemed unconstitutional by the Federation Constitutional Court in 1997 because "it only represented one group".

== Croatia ==
=== Counties ===
Flag	Administrative division	Adopted	Description
	Bjelovar-Bilogora County		A horizontal bicolor of yellow and green with the county's coat of arms in the center
	Brod-Posavina County		A blue field with two diagonal white stripes and the county's coat of arms in the center
	Dubrovnik-Neretva County		A horizontal bicolor of red and white with the county's coat of arms in the center
	Istria County		A horizontal bicolor of blue and green with the county's coat of arms in the center
	Karlovac County		A horizontal bicolor of red and yellow with the county's coat of arms in the center
	Koprivnica-Križevci County		Orthogonally quartered red and blue with the county's coat of arms in the center
	Krapina-Zagorje County		A red field with narrow gold stripes at the top and bottom and the county's coat of arms in the center
	Lika-Senj County		Unequal horizontal triband of blue and white with the county's coat of arms in the center
	Međimurje County		A vertical bicolor of white and red with the county's coat of arms in the center
	Osijek-Baranja County		Five unequal horizontal stripes of white and blue with the county's coat of arms in the center
	Požega-Slavonia County		Unequal horizontal triband of green and yellow with the county's coat of arms in the center
	Primorje-Gorski Kotar County		A sky blue field with the county's coat of arms between two thin white horizontal stripes
	Šibenik-Knin County		A blue field with the county's coat of arms between two thin white horizontal stripes
	Sisak-Moslavina County		A blue field with narrow red and white stripes along either the hoist or the top side and the county's coat of arms in the center
	Split-Dalmatia County		Unequal vertical stripes of yellow and blue with the county's coat of arms in the center of the yellow part
	Varaždin County		Five horizontal stripes of red and white with the county's coat of arms at the hoist side
	Virovitica-Podravina County		Horizontal triband of blue and white with the county's coat of arms in the center
	Vukovar-Srijem County		Seven horizontal stripes of yellow and white with the county's coat of arms in the center
	Zadar County		Two white and blue horizontal stripes separated by a wavy line, with the county's coat of arms in the center
	Zagreb County		Five horizontal stripes of green and white with the county's coat of arms in the center
	Zagreb		The city's coat of arms on a blue field.

== Czechia ==
=== Czech lands ===
Flag	Administrative division	Adopted
	Bohemia	
	Moravia	
	Czech Silesia	

=== Regions ===
Flag	Administrative division	Adopted
	Prague	28 April 1891
	Central Bohemian Region	27 November 2001
	South Bohemian Region	22 November 2002
	Plzeň Region	31 January 2002
	Karlovy Vary Region	27 June 2001
	Ústí nad Labem Region	9 April 2002
	Liberec Region	8 October 2001
	Hradec Králové Region	8 October 2001
	Pardubice Region	27 June 2001
	Vysočina Region	14 March 2001
	South Moravian Region	25 November 2003
	Olomouc Region	27 June 2001
	Zlín Region	22 November 2002
	Moravian-Silesian Region	13 November 2001

== Denmark ==
Flag	Date	Use	Description
	1970s-present	Unofficial flag of Bornholm	Nordic Cross Flag in red and green. Also known in a version with a white fimbriation of the green cross in a style similar to design of the Norwegian flag.
	1633-present	Unofficial flag of Ærø	Tricolour in yellow, green and red Very similar to the Flag of Lithuania. A frequent interpretation is that the colours represent the kings of Denmark (red), the dukes of Schleswig (yellow) and the islands itself (green).
	1976-present	Unofficial flag of Vendsyssel	Nordic Cross Flag in blue, orange and green. Designed by Mogens Bohøj.
	1975-present	Unofficial flag of Jutland	A Nordic Cross Flag in blue, green and red. Designed by Per Kramer in 1975. (1794) and Russian flag
	2015-present	Unofficial flag of Funen	There are two proposed flags: The green colour symbolises the island's importance as the 'pantry of Denmark'. The blue represents the island itself, and the red its strong ties to Denmark.

=== Autonomous entities ===
Flag	Date	Use	Description
	1948–Present	Flag of the Faroe Islands	A red Nordic cross, which is offset to the left. The red cross is surrounded by an azure-blue border and is set on a white field
	1985–Present	Flag of Greenland	Two equal horizontal bands of white (top) and red with a large disk slightly to the hoist side of centre. The top half of the disk is red, the bottom half is white

== Estonia ==
=== Counties ===
Each county of Estonia has adopted a flag, each of them conforming to a pattern: a white half at the top bearing the county's coat of arms in the middle, and a green half at the bottom.

Flag	Administrative division	Adopted	Description
	Harju	1939–present	
	Hiiu	1996–present	
	Ida-Viru	1997–present	
	Jõgeva	1996–present	
	Järva	1939–present	
	Lääne	1939–present	
	Lääne-Viru	1996–present	
	Põlva	1996–present	
	Pärnu	1939–present	
	Rapla	1996–present	
	Saare	1939–present	
	Tartu	1939–present	
	Valga	1939–present	
	Viljandi	1939–present	
	Võru	1939–present	

== Finland ==
=== Regions ===
Not all regions have selected an official flag.

Flag	Date	Use	Description
		Flag of Central Finland	A banner of arms based on the region's coat of arms. Ratio: 1:1
		Flag of Central Ostrobothnia	A banner of arms based on the region's coat of arms
	1998–	Flag of Kainuu	A banner of arms based on the region's coat of arms designed by a Finnish heraldist Olof Eriksson in 1978. The flag itself was adopted in 25.6.1998.
	1997–	Flag of North Karelia	A red flag featuring two armored arms from the regional coat of arms with a fortressy white field on the hoist side of the flag. Adopted by the regional council on 8.6.1997.
		Flag of North Savo	A black swallow-tailed flag featuring a loaded bow from the regional coat of arms placed between two yellow stripes.
		Flag of Päijät-Häme	A banner of arms based on the region's coat of arms.
	2018–	Flag of Kanta-Häme	Flag featuring elements from the region's coat of arms. Designed by heraldist Tuomas Hyrsky and adopted by the regional council on the 100th anniversary of the Finnish flag on 28.5.2018. A further ceremony was held in the Häme Castle on 4.2.2019.
	1990–	Flag of Satakunta	A swallow-tailed banner of arms based on the region's coat of arms from 1557. Designed by artist Reino Niiniranta and officially adopted on 21.11.1990. The regional flag's official flag day is on 11 October, on the name day of Otso.
	2020–	Flag of South Savo	A black flag charged with the bow and arrow from the region's coat of arms and a yellow hoist. Designed by designer Suvi Ripatti and officially adopted on 09.06.2020.
		Flag of Uusimaa	A banner of arms based on the region's coat of arms.

== France ==
=== Metropolitan regions ===
Not all regions have selected an official flag.

Flag	Date	Use	Description
	2016–	Flag of Auvergne-Rhône-Alpes	The flag's four quarters respectively contain a red gonfalon on yellow (Auvergne), a white cross on red (Savoy), a white lion on red (Lyonnais) and a blue dolphin on yellow (Dauphiné).
	2016–	Flag of Bourgogne-Franche-Comté	The flag combines the two former regions' traditional coats of arms.
	1923–	Flag of Brittany	The flag, called Gwen ha du (White and black) was created in 1923 by Morvan Marchal (1900–1963, a member of various political and cultural organisations). He used as his inspiration the old Breton flag (a centred black cross on a white background), called Kroaz Du (Black cross), and the flags of the United States and Greece as these two countries were seen at that time as the respective symbols of liberty and democracy. The nine horizontal stripes represent the traditional dioceses of Brittany into which the duchy was divided historically. The five black stripes represent the French or Gallo speaking dioceses of Dol, Nantes, Rennes, Saint-Malo and Saint-Brieuc—while the four white stripes represent the Breton speaking dioceses of Trégor, Léon, Cornouaille and Vannes. The ermine canton recalls the ducal arms of Brittany.
		Flag of Centre-Val de Loire	The region hasn't adopted a traditional flag and uses its logo on flags.
	1755–	Flag of Corsica	The Flag of Corsica was adopted by General of the Nation Pasquale di Paoli in 1755 and was based on a traditional flag used previously. It portrays a Moor's Head in black wearing a white bandana above his eyes on a white background. Previously, the bandana covered his eyes.
	2022–	Flag of Grand Est	The region hasn't adopted a traditional flag and uses its logo on flags.
		Flag of Île-de-France	The region hasn't adopted a traditional flag and uses its logo on flags.
		Flag of Normandy	Based on the medieval emblems of the duke of Normandy.
	1974	Flag of Normandy	Using a Nordic cross in reference to the Nordic past of Normandy, created in 1974.
	2016–	Flag of Nouvelle-Aquitaine	A red lion and blue wavy stripes on a white field. The red lion has been used in the area since the eleventh century, appearing in the coats of arms of Poitiers and several other settlements in the region. The waves represent the name "Aquitaine", which stems from the Latin Aquitaina (land of water).
		Flag of Occitanie	The region hasn't adopted a traditional flag and uses its logo on flags.
		Flag of Pays de la Loire	The region hasn't adopted a traditional flag and uses its logo on flags.
	12th century –	Flag of Provence-Alpes-Côte d'Azur	Combining elements of the former historical entities existing over the current territory of the region: County of Provence, the Dauphiné and County of Nice.

=== Overseas regions ===
Of the French overseas regions, only Martinique has adopted an official flag.

Flag	Date	Use	Description
	2023–	Flag of Martinique	Two equal horizontal bands of green (top) and black with a red triangle based at the hoist.

== Georgia ==
Flag	Date	Use	Description
	1992 –	Flag of Abkhazia	Seven horizontal stripes alternating green and white; in the canton, a white open hand below a semicircle of seven five-pointed stars on a red field.
	2004 –	Flag of Adjara	Seven horizontal stripes alternating blue and white; in the canton, the national flag of Georgia.

== Germany ==
=== States ===
Many states have separate civil and state versions of their flags; the state flags (listed) include the state arms, while the civil versions don't. See Flags of German states.

Flag	Date	Use	Description
	1954–	Flag of Baden-Württemberg	A black over gold bi-color.
	1953–	Flag of Bavaria	There are two official flags of Bavaria. One is an array of 21 or more lozenges of blue and white, the other is a white over blue bicolor.
	1954–1990 (West Berlin); 1990–	Flag of Berlin	White with red bars at the top and bottom, with a bear off-centre towards the hoist.
	1991–	Flag of Brandenburg	A horizontal bi-color of red over white, with the arms of the state (land), in the center.
	1952–	Flag of Bremen	Eight or more alternating red and white stripes, checked at the hoist.
	1751–	Flag of Hamburg	A white castle with three towers and a closed gate.
	1948–	Flag of Hesse	The state flag of Hesse consists of a bicolor of a red top and a bottom white stripe.
	1951–	Flag of Lower Saxony	The flag of Lower Saxony consists of the flag of the Federal Republic of Germany in Schwarz-Rot-Gold, with the coat of arms of Lower Saxony, shifted slightly toward the hoist.
	1990–	Flag of Mecklenburg-Western Pomerania	Five horizontal stripes, that are from the top to bottom: blue (ultramarine), white, yellow, white, and red (vermilion).
	1953–	Flag of North Rhine-Westphalia	A horizontal tricolour of green, white, and red.
	1945–	Flag of Rhineland-Palatinate	The flag of Rhineland-Palatinate is a tricolor of three horizontal bands of black, red and gold. These colors are Germany's national colors and are sometimes referred to as schwarz-rot-gold. In the canton, or the upper left corner, are the arms of the state of Rhineland-Palatinate.
	1957–	Flag of Saarland	The flag of Saarland is based on the flag of Germany and is a black, red, and gold (yellow) horizontal tricolor. In the center of the flag is the coat of arms of Saarland.
	1991–	Flag of Saxony	A bicolour of white over green.
	1991–	Flag of Saxony-Anhalt	The state flag of Saxony-Anhalt is a yellow and black bi-color. In the center of the flag is the coat of arms of Saxony-Anhalt
	1948–	Flag of Schleswig-Holstein	The state flag of Schleswig-Holstein is a horizontal tricolour of blue, white, and red.
	1991–	Flag of Thuringia	The state flag of Thuringia consists of a bicolor of a white top and a bottom red stripecentre.

== Greece ==
=== Regions ===
Flag	Date	Use	Description
	1980s–	Flag of Macedonia (Greece)	The flag of Macedonia (Greece), adopted in 1980s, is a blue banner featuring the Vergina Sun, the emblem of the Ancient Greek Kingdom of Macedon.
	1821–	Flag of Spetses	The flag of Spetses, adopted in early 1821 during the Greek Revolution, features an azure field surrounded by a thick red border, defaced with a Cross on an overturned Crescent (symbolizing the Christian Greek victory over the Muslim Ottoman Empire), a spear (symbolizing the armed struggle for freedom), an anchor (symbolizing the maritime tradition and merchant wealth of the island as well as most of Greece), a snake around the anchor (symbolizing the Goddess Athena, wisdom and the island's ancient Greek heritage), a dove (symbolizing peace, justice and prosperity) and the words «ΕΛΕΥΘΕΡΙΑ Ή ΘΑΝΑΤΟΣ», meaning "FREEDOM OR DEATH", Greece's National Motto.
	1821–	Flag of Hydra	The flag of Hydra, adopted in early 1821 during the Greek Revolution, its design and symbolism are almost identical to those of the Flag of Spetses (see above), though the colours are slightly different. The Symbols are also almost identical, though instead of a spear there is a flagpole with a flag and some of the symbols are grey instead of red.
	1828–	Flag of Kastellorizo	The flag of Kastellorizo, adopted in early 1828 during the Greek Revolution, it features a white field surrounded by a blue border. It is defaced with a Cross, an Anchor and a Heart. On the left and right of these symbols are the words «ΜΕΓΙΣΤΗ» and «ΚΑΣΤΕΛΛΟΡΙΖΟ» ("MEGISTE" & "KASTELLORIZO"), the two names of the island.
	1864–	Flag of Corfu	The flag of the island of Corfu, adopted in 1864 after the annexation of the United States of the Ionian Islands by the Kingdom of Greece as a gift to George I of Greece by the United Kingdom, features a blue field surrounded by a golden border and a thicker dark red one. It is defaced with an Ancient Greek Galley which is surrounded by a circle and the words «ΔΗΜΟΣ ΚΕΡΚΥΡΑΙΩΝ» meaning "MUNICIPALITY/PEOPLE OF THE CORFIOTS".
	1864–	Flag of Zakynthos	The flag of the island of Zakynthos, adopted in 1864 after the annexation of the United States of the Ionian Islands by the Kingdom of Greece as a gift to George I of Greece by the United Kingdom, features a Green field with a golden depiction of Zakynthos (person), the figure from Ancient Greek Mythology after whom the island was named. Near the top left side of Zakynthos the name of the island in Greek («ΖΑΚΥΝΘΟΣ») is written while under the depiction is the island's motto, «ΘΕΛΕΙ ΑΡΕΤΗ ΚΑΙ ΤΟΛΜΗ Η ΕΛΕΥΘΕΡΙΑ» ("FREEDOM DEMANDS VALOUR AND BRAVERY") by the Zakynthian poet Andreas Kalvos.
	1821–	Flag of Psara	The flag of the island of Psara, adopted in 1821 during the Greek Revolution, is almost identical in style and design to the flags of Hydra, Spetses and other islands (see above) with some differences. The field is white and the surrounding border is red while all the symbols it is defaced with are all red. The symbols are also almost identical though instead of a dove there is an eagle, probably a reference to the Eagle of Zeus, a symbol of power and authority. The flag features the words «ΕΛΕΥΘΕΡΙΑ Ή ΘΑΝΑΤΟΣ» ("FREEDOM OR DEATH", Greece's National Motto) and «ΨΑΡΑ» ("PSARA", the island's name in the Greek language).
	1821–	Flag of Mani Peninsula	The flag of the island of the Mani Peninsula, adopted in 1821 during the Greek Revolution, features a white field with a blue Greek cross and the phrases «ΝΙΚΗ Ή ΘΑΝΑΤΟΣ» ("VICTORY OR DEATH", a traditional Greek battle cry) and «ΤΑΝ Ή ΕΠΙ ΤΑΣ» (a Laconic phrase said by Spartan mothers to their sons when they left for war; lit. "IT OR ON IT" meaning that if the Spartan is to return alive he should return with his shield [so as to have not dropped it and fled the battle] or be returned on it by his comrades, dead).

== Hungary ==
=== Counties ===
Flag	From	Flag of	Description	Ratio
	10 October 1991	Bács-Kiskun County	A horizontal bicolor of blue and white with the county's coat of arms in the center.	1:2
	27 May 1991	Baranya County	A green flag with the county's coat of arms and the inscription "BARANYA-MEGYE" (Baranya County) in the center.	1:2
	27 March 1992	Békés County	A horizontal bicolor of blue and white with the county's coat of arms and the inscription "BÉKÉS-MEGYE" (Békés County) in the center.	2:3
	29 August 1991	Borsod-Abaúj-Zemplén County	A horizontal bicolor of red and blue with the county's coat of arms in the center.	
	15 September 2011	Budapest	A white flag bordered with a red and green "wolf-teeth" pattern, charged with the city's coat of arms in the center.	2:3
	15 September 2011	Budapest	A white flag bordered with a red and green "wolf-teeth" pattern, charged with the city's coat of arms in the center.	2:1
	15 June 1991	Csongrád County	A green flag with the county's coat of arms and the inscription "CSONGRÁD MEGYE" (Csongrád County) in the center.	
	13 March 1992	Fejér County	A horizontal bicolor of yellow and green with the county's coat of arms and the inscription "FEJÉR VÁRMEGYE" (Fejér County) in the center.	2:3
	28 December 1991	Győr-Moson-Sopron County	A horizontal bicolor of red and blue with the county's coat of arms in the center.	1:2
	31 December 1991	Hajdú-Bihar County	A white flag bordered with a blue and yellow "wolf-teeth" pattern, charged with the county's coat of arms in the center.	1:2
	22 October 1991	Heves County	A green flag with the county's coat of arms in the center.	7:10
	8 February 1991	Jász-Nagykun-Szolnok County	A horizontal bicolor of blue and white with the county's coat of arms and the inscription "JÁSZ-NAGYKUN-SZOLNOK-MEGYE" (Jász-Nagykun-Szolnok County) in the center.	1:2
	21 March 1991	Komárom-Esztergom County	A white flag with the county's coat of arms and the inscription "KOMÁROM-ESZTERGOM MEGYE" (Komárom-Esztergom County) in the center.	2:3
	27 June 1991	Nógrád County	A blue flag with the county's coat of arms and the inscription "NÓGRÁD A KÖZÜGYÉRT" (Nógrád for public affairs) on the hoist side.	100:149
	25 January 1991	Pest County	A horizontal bicolor of blue and yellow with the county's coat of arms and the inscription "PEST MEGYE" (Pest County) on the hoist side.	1:2
	21 May 1992	Somogy County	A horizontal bicolor of blue and yellow with the county's coat of arms and the inscription "SOMOGY-MEGYE" (Somogy County) on the hoist side.	2:3
	7 September 1992	Szabolcs-Szatmár-Bereg County	A white flag bordered with a blue and red „wolf-teeth” pattern, charged with the county's coat of arms and the inscription "SZABOLCS-SZATMÁR-BEREG MEGYE" (Szabolcs-Szatmár-Bereg County) in the center.	2:3
	27 April 1991	Tolna County	A horizontal bicolor of blue and white with the county's coat of arms and the inscription "TOLNA MEGYE" (Tolna County) in the center.	2:3
	31 May 1991	Vas County	A horizontal bicolor of white and blue with the county's coat of arms and the inscription "VAS MEGYE" (Vas County) in the center.	1:2
	5 July 1991	Veszprém County	A horizontal bicolor of white and green with the county's coat of arms on the hoist side.	2:3
	9 July 2010	Zala County	A horizontal bicolor of blue and white with the county's coat of arms and the inscription "ZALA MEGYE" (Zala County) in the center.	1:2

== Ireland ==
=== Provinces ===
Flag	Date	Use	Description
		Flag of Connacht	The flag of Connacht is a heraldic banner of the arms of Connacht, a dimidiated (divided in half from top to bottom) eagle and armed hand.
		Flag of Leinster	The flag of the Irish province of Leinster is a banner with the provincial coat of arms: a gold Irish harp with silver strings on a green field (blazon: vert a harp or stringed argent). These arms are similar to the arms of Ireland, which have the same device on a field of blue rather than green
		Flag of Munster	The flag of Munster consists of three gold crowns on a blue field. The crowns were the arms of Ireland before being superseded by the golden harp in the 16th century. The meaning of the crowns on the flag is not certain, but one possibility is that they may represent three of the medieval Hiberno-Norman lordships in Munster; the O’Briens (Thomond), the Butlers (Ormond) and the Fitzgeralds (Desmond).
		Flag of Ulster	Ulster is one of the four traditional provinces of Ireland. Only three of the nine counties of Ulster are part of the Republic of Ireland, the other six making up Northern Ireland, part of the United Kingdom. However, the flag is still used to represent Ulster as a whole. The Red Hand of Ulster is a symbol that is either derived from the O'Neill dynasty, then the most prominent Irish clan in Ulster, or the Dextra Dei of early Christian iconography. The gold background featuring a red cross comes from the coat of arms of the Burkes, a Hiberno-Norman noble family.

== Italy ==
=== Regions ===
Flag	Date	Use	Description
	1999–	Flag of Abruzzo	A burgundy field with the coat of arms of Abruzzo in the centre
	1947–	Flag of the Aosta Valley	The flag of the Aosta Valley consists of two vertical stripes (the left black the right red), sometimes with the arms of the Aosta Valley in the centre.
	2001–	Flag of Apulia	A white field with the words Regione Puglia ("Apulia Region") in gold letters at the top center, with the coat of arms of Apulia below; a green stripe towards the hoist-side, and a red stripe towards the fly-side.
	1973–	Flag of Basilicata	A field of azure with the coat of arms of Basilicata in the centre
	1992–	Flag of Calabria	A blue field with the coat of arms of Calabria in the centre, and the words "Regione Calabria" above and below
	1971–	Flag of Campania	The Campania Region has taken as its emblem the one given the Maritime Republic of Amalfi in its infancy. Said emblem consists of a red stripe on a white field. Regional Law n. 1 of 21 July 1971
	1992–	Flag of Emilia-Romagna	The emblem of the region superimposed upon a field of white, with a red bar and the words "Regione Emilia-Romagna" below
	2001–	Flag of Friuli-Venezia Giulia	A golden eagle facing to its right standing on white fortifications on a blue background.
	1992–	Flag of Lazio	The coat of arms of Lazio surrounded by laurel and olive branches, surmounted by a golden crown on a sky-blue field with the words "Regione Lazio" in gold
	1992–	Flag of Lombardy	A green field with the Rosa Camuna (also called curvilinear cross) in white, rotated 22.5° in the centre
	1997–	Flag of Liguria	A vertical tricolour of green, red and blue; charged with the coat of arms of Liguria.
	1995–	Flag of Marche	A white field with the regional emblem of Marche.
	1995–	Flag of Molise	A field of blue with the coat of arms in the centre, and "Regione Molise" in gold below
	1995–	Flag of Piedmont	Banner of arms of the Prince of Piedmont with a heraldic label
	1999–	Flag of Sardinia	Four moors head in St. George's cross
	1990–	Flag of Sicily	The current flag was adopted on 28 July 1990 under regional law N. 2, Art. 12. The law was later updated in 1998. It was not until 1 January 2000, under regional law N. 1, that the flag was adopted as the official symbol of Sicily, including legislation mandating public display of the flag at all Sicilian public buildings. The flag, officially used by the ancient Kingdom of Sicily, has existed in various forms since 1282. The flag is rectangular in form and is characterised by the presence of the Trinacria (triskelion) in the centre. It features a softened image of the winged-head of Medusa and three ears of wheat (replacing snakeheads) representing the island's fertility. The three bent legs represent the island's three capes or points, while in mythology it is said to represent good luck and prosperity. The background of the flag is divided by a diagonal from left to right, and is coloured gold (lower left) and red-orange (upper right). The colours represent the cities of Palermo and Corleone, respectively, the first two to found a confederation against the Angevin rule.
	1983–	Flag of Trentino-Alto Adige/Südtirol	A horizontal bicolour of white and blue, with the coat of arms of Trentino-South Tyrol superimposed on top
	1995–	Flag of Tuscany	A white field with a silver Pegasus rampant in the center between two red horizontal bands.
	2003–	Flag of Umbria	green with the emblem
	1999–	Flag of Veneto	The arms of Regione del Veneto on a Pompeian red background; on the fly edge, seven tails bearing the coat of arms of the seven province capitals of Veneto.

== Lithuania ==
=== Counties ===
Each county of Lithuania has adopted a flag, each of them conforming to a pattern: a blue rectangle, with ten instances of the Cross of Vytis appearing in gold, acts as a fringe to the central feature of the flag, which is chosen by the county itself. Most of the central designs were adapted from the counties' coat of arms.

Flag	Date	Use	Description
	2004–present	Alytus County	
	2004–present	Kaunas County	
	2004–present	Klaipėda County	
	2004–present	Marijampolė County	
	2004–present	Panevėžys County	
	2004–present	Šiauliai County	
	2004–present	Tauragė County	
	2004–present	Telšiai County	
	2004–present	Utena County	
	2004–present	Vilnius County	

== Liechtenstein ==
=== Municipalities ===
Each of the eleven municipalities has its own flag, all flown as vertical banners.

Flag	Municipality	Adopted	Description
	Balzers		
	Eschen		
	Gamprin		
	Mauren		
	Planken		
	Ruggell		
	Schaan		
	Schellenberg		
	Triesen		
	Triesenberg		
	Vaduz		

== Luxembourg ==
Flag	Date	Use	Description
		Flag of Wiltz Canton	

== Malta ==
=== Regions ===
Flag	Date	Use	Description
	1964–	Flag of Gozo	Symbolises the islands nickname 'The Island of the Three Hills', and also the fact that it is surrounded by sea.

== Moldova ==
=== Districts ===
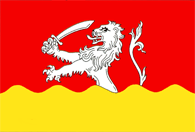
Anenii Noi District

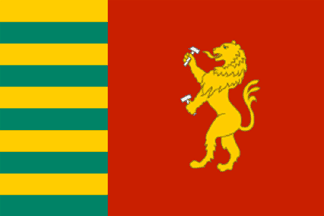
Basarabeasca District

Cahul District

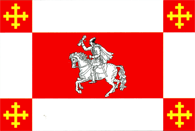
Călărași District

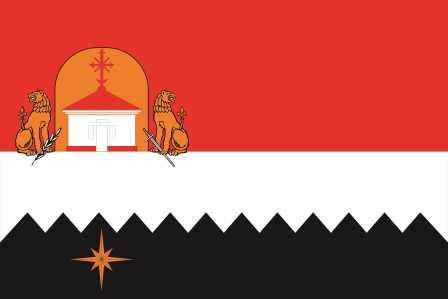
Căușeni District

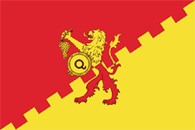
Cimișlia District

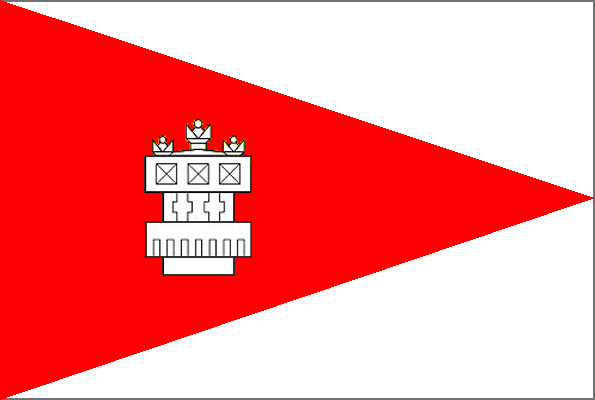
Criuleni District

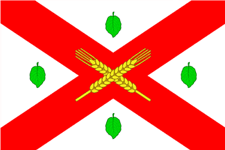
Dondușeni District

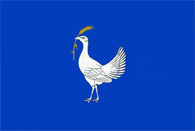
Drochia District

Dubăsari District

Edineț District

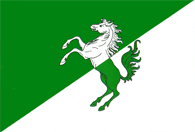
Fălești District

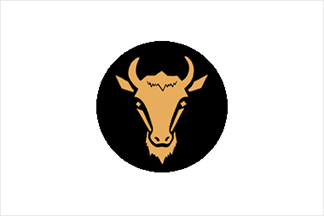
Glodeni District

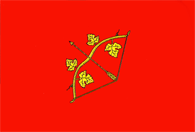
Hîncești District

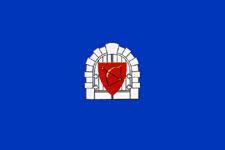
Ialoveni District

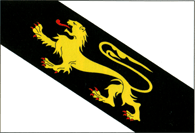
Leova District

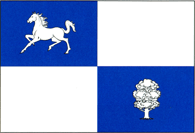
Nisporeni District

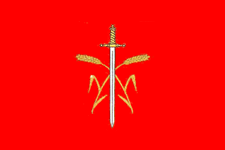
Ocnița District

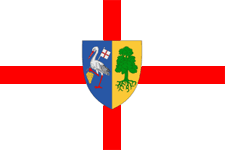
Orhei District

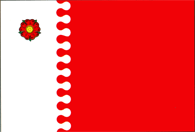
Rîșcani District

Rezina District

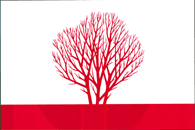
Sîngerei District

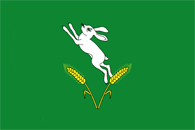
Șoldănești District

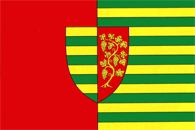
Ștefan Vodă District

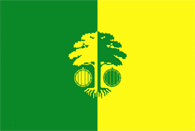
Strășeni District

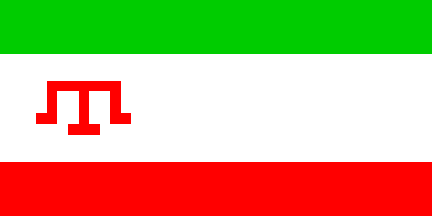
Taraclia District

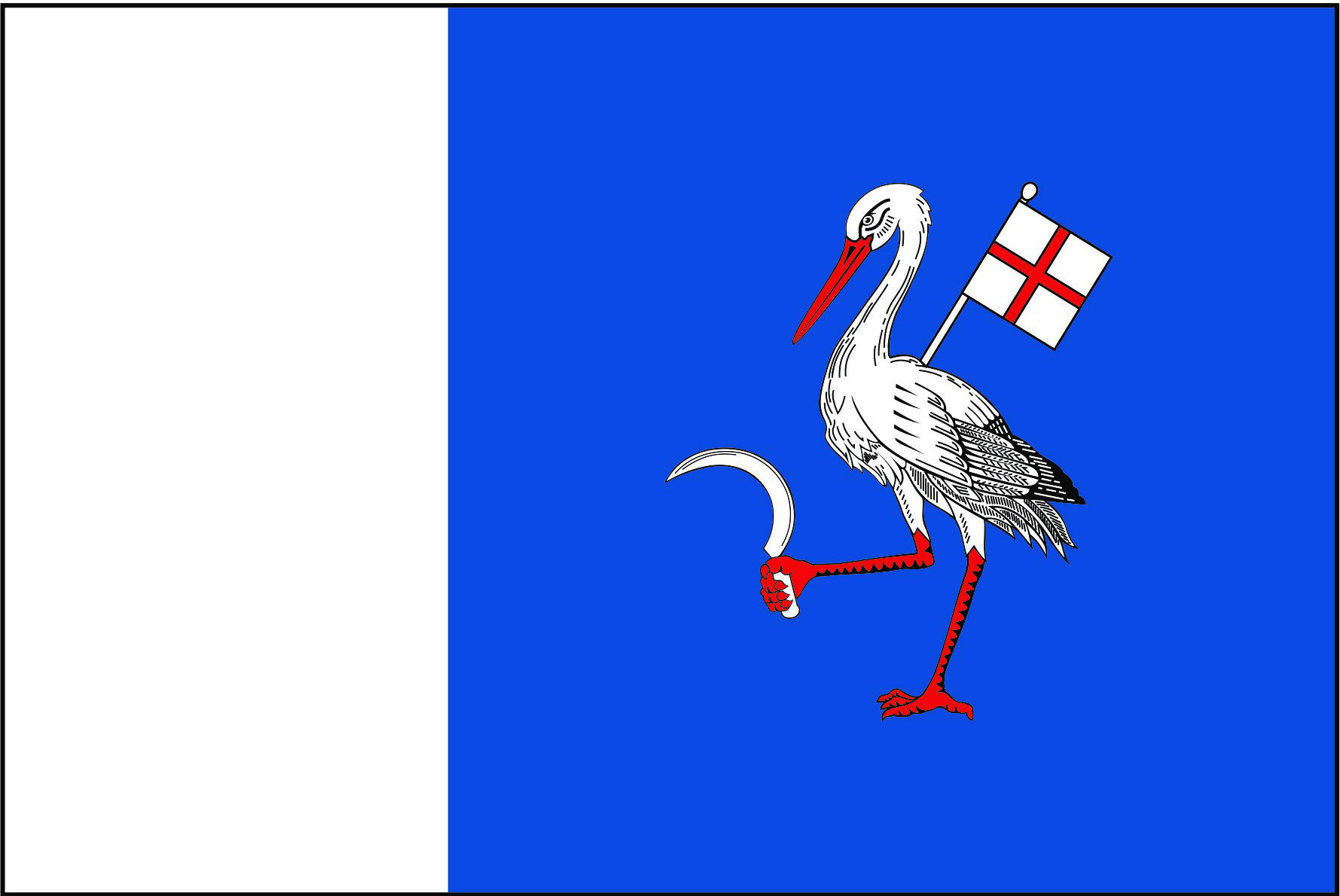
Telenești District

Ungheni District

=== Autonomous territorial units ===
Gagauzia (details)

== Netherlands ==
=== Provinces ===
Flag	Date	Use	Description
	1947–	Flag of Drenthe	White and red are the colours of a former leader, the Bishop of Utrecht. The black castle and red stars are a memory of Coevorden standing up against the Bisshop.
	1986–	Flag of Flevoland	The flag recalls how the new province was reclaimed from the IJsselmeer. The central yellow stripe, wavy then straight, symbolises the transformation of the sea into land. Its colour symbolises rapeseed, planted to stabilise the land. The blue represents water, the green the land. The white fleur-de-lys (lily) is a pun. It commemorates Cornelis Lely, designer of the original polders, essential to the province.
	1957–	Flag of Friesland	The flag is based on the kings of Frysia in 15th century. The colours are the same as those of the national flag of the Netherlands. The stripes and leaves of the yellow water-lily, represent the 7 districts of Friesland.
	1953–	Flag of Gelderland	The colours are taken from the coat of arms, in which the lions from former duchesses are combined.
	1950–	Flag of Groningen	The flag combines the colours of the city of Groningen with red and blue in the flag of the area around Groningen.
	1953–	Flag of Limburg	The red lion comes from the coat of arms of the Duchy of Limburg. The white and yellow are taken from the local coat of arms, while the narrow blue stripe symbolises the Meuse, which flows through the province.
	1959–	Flag of North Brabant	The North Brabantian flag dates from the Middle Ages and has the highest seniority among all Dutch province flags. The colours gules and argent have been used in Brabant standards, flags and pennants since the proclamation of the County of Louvain (942 CE) during the Lotharingian period. Later, the Duchy of Brabant continued using these colours. During the Middle Ages and the centuries after, the red and white would often be used. At the end of the 18th century, the flag fell into disuse. Since 1959, the red and white checkered flag has become the official flag of the province of North Brabant.
	1958–	Flag of North Holland	The colours of the flag are similar to the colours of the coat of arms, which is a combination of the coat of arms from Holland and West Friesland.
	1948–	Flag of Overijssel	The yellow and red stripes are a reference to the former association of this province with Holland. The blue source in the middle stands for the river IJssel, which gave the province its name.
	1985–	Flag of South Holland	The flag is a banner of the coat of arms of Holland.
	1952–	Flag of Utrecht	From 1528, the bishop of Utrecht used a red flag with a white cross. This flag is still seen in the upper canton.
	1949–	Flag of Zeeland	In the centre of the flag, the coat of arms of Zeeland is depicted. The wavy blue lines represent the waves and the constant struggle against the sea. The lion is a symbol for the winner of this battle between man and sea.

== Poland ==
=== Voivodeships ===
Flag	Date	Use	Description
	2000–	Flag of Greater Poland Voivodeship	Trapezoid divided into red stripe on the right, and white stripe on the left, with a white eagle with yellow (golden) beak, legs, stripes on its wings, and a ring on its tail, featured in the middle of the red stripe
	2012-12-28 –	Flag of Świętokrzyskie Voivodeship	Rectangle divided into four parts. Its left part features a yellow vertical stripe, which wight equals to 1:4 of the wight of the flag. Its right part is divided into three horizontal stripes, that are, from top to bottom: blue, white, and red. In the middle of the white stripe is placed the coat of arms of the voivodeship.
	2000–	Flag of Kuyavian–Pomeranian Voivodeship	Three horizontal stripes of red, white, and black colour, with the middle stripe being twice the size of the other ones
	1999–	Flag of Lesser Poland Voivodeship	Three horizontal stripes of white, yellow, and red, with the top and bottom stripes being twice the size of the middle one
	2000-10-27 –	Flag of Lower Silesian Voivodeship	Yellow (golden) rectangle with the left-faced black eagle, with a white (silver) crescent-shaped przepaska put across its wings, with a white (silver) cross pattée on top of it, in its middle.
	2004-04-14 –	Flag of Lublin Voivodeship	Three horizontal stripes: white (silver), red, and yellow (golden), with the coat of arms of the voivodeship, in form of the white (silver) male cervus mid-jump, with a yellow (golden) crown on its neck, placed on the red escutcheon, placed in the centre of the flag
	2000–	Flag of Lubusz Voivodeship	Four stripes, which are, from top to bottom, yellow (golden), white, (silver), red, and green, with top and bottom stripes being twice the size of the 2 middle stripes
	2002-06-25 –	Flag of Łódź Voivodeship	Rectangle divided into 5 vertical stripes, that are altering between red and yellow
	2006-05-29 –	Flag of Masovian Voivodeship	Red rectangle with white eagle with yellow beak and legs, on the left side
	2004-12-21 –	Flag of Opole Voivodeship	Two horizontal stripes, with yellow on the top, and blue at the bottom, of which, the top stripe is twice the size of the bottom one
	2002-08-30 –	Flag of Podlaskie Voivodeship	Four horizontal stripes, that are, from the top to bottom: white, red, yellow, and blue
	2002-03-25 –	Flag of Pomeranian Voivodeship	Yellow rectangle with a left-faced black griffin placed in the centre
	2001–	Flag of Silesian Voivodeship	Three horizontal stripes, that are from top to bottom: blue, yellow, and blue, with blue stripes being twice the size of the yellow middle stripe
	2000–	Flag of Podkarpackie Voivodeship	Rectangle divided vertically in 3 stripes with smaller white stripes on the sides, and bigger white stripe in the middle, with the coat of arms of the Subcarpathian Voivodeship in centre.
	2002-08-06 –	Flag of Warmian–Masurian Voivodeship	Red flag with a white boundary on its top, bottom, and right sides, and with the head of a white (silver) eagle, with yellow (golden) beak, and an eye, wearing a yellow (golden) crown, located on its left side
	2000–	Flag of West Pomeranian Voivodeship	Rectangle divided vertically in 3 stripes with white, red, and white colour, and with the coat of arms of the West Pomeranian Voivodeship in the middle

== Portugal ==
=== Autonomous regions ===
Flag	Date	Use	Description
	1979–	Flag of the Azores	The flag of Azores has the colours of the flag of Portugal until 1910. It also has 9 stars representing the islands of the archipelago, the Portuguese shield and a Goshawk (in Portuguese Açor) that gives the name to the archipelago. It is an adaption of the first autonomy flag used during the autonomic movement in 1893, itself adapted of the then monarchist flag.
	1978–	Flag of Madeira	The design consists of a blue-gold-blue vertical triband with a red-bordered white Cross of Christ in the centre.

== Romania ==
Flag	Date	Use	Description
	1990—present	Bucharest (City)	
	1990—present	Arad (municipality)	A bright yellow flag with a blue horizontal wavy strip, symbolizing the Mureș river and the city coat of arms centered.
	1990—present	Alba Iulia (municipality)	
	1992—present	Brașov (municipality)	
	1990—present	Carei (municipality)	
	1997—present	Constanța (municipality)	
	1992—present	Oradea (municipality)	
	1998—present	Târgu Mureș (municipality)	

== Russia ==
=== Federal subjects ===
Flag	Date	Use	Description
	1992–	Flag of Adygea	Twelve golden stars resembling a bow charged with three golden arrows on a dark green background
	2009–	Flag of Arkhangelsk Oblast	A light blue saltire on a field of white with the coat of arms of the Arkhangelsk Oblast in the center
	2001–	Flag of Astrakhan Oblast	A crown and scimitar charge on a teal blue field.
	1992–	Flag of Bashkortostan	A horizontal tricolor of teal blue, white and green with a yellow circle bearing the kurai flower.
	2000–	Flag of Belgorod Oblast	A blue cross with four cantons (white, green, black and red) and the coat of arms on the white canton.
	1992–	Flag of Bryansk Oblast	A burgundy field defaced with the coat of arms of the Bryansk Oblast in the center
	2004–	Flag of Chechnya	A horizontal tricolor of green (representing Islam), white (representing peace or the Caucasus Mountains) and red (representing bloodshed). The national ornament is at the white band at the hoist.
	1992–	Flag of Chuvashia	A yellow flag with a stylized red tree of life charged on the flag, a symbol of rebirth, with the three suns, a traditional emblem popular in Chuvash art.
	1999–	Flag of Crimea (Note: Controlled by Russia but recognised as part of Ukraine by most of the international community)	A horizontal tricolor of a thin blue stripe, a large white stripe, and thin red stripe.
	1994–	Flag of Dagestan	A horizontal tricolor of green, blue, and red.
	1994–	Flag of Ingushetia	A red triskelion sign on a white background, with narrow green horizontal stripes above and below
	1994–	Flag of Kabardino-Balkaria	A tricolor of light blue, white, and green with a Mount Elbrus charge in the center.
	1997–	Flag of Kaliningrad Oblast	Divided into three horizontal stripes. The upper stripe is red, a thin (1/3 of the upper strip) yellow stripe in the middle and a dark blue stripe of the same size as the red bar. In the canton is a silver-and-black stylized medieval castle with open gates and the monogram of Empress Elizabeth Petrovna (under which reign parts of the region were shortly under Russian control during the Seven Years' War).
	1993–	Flag of Kalmykia	On the flag of Kalmykia, the yellow stands for the sun, the people and the religious faith of the nation. The blue represents the sky, eternity, and steadiness. The lotus is a symbol of purity, spiritual rebirth and happiness. Its five upper petals represent the continents and the lower four stand for the quarters of the globe. Together, they symbolize the will of the Kalmyks to live in friendship and to cooperate with all the nations of the world.
	2004–	Flag of Kaluga Oblast	
	1996–	Flag of Karachay-Cherkessia	A horizontal tricolour of light blue, green and red, with a circle containing a rising sun from behind a mountain, centered on the green band
	1993–	Flag of Karelia	The national flag of the Republic of Karelia is a rectangle with equal horizontal stripes: the upper stripe is red, the middle one is blue and the lower is green.
	1997–	Flag of the Komi Republic	The flag is a horizontal tricolour composed of three bars of, from top to bottom, medium blue, green, and white. Together, they represent Komi's natural wealth. The blue represents the splendour and spaciousness of the northern sky. The green represents nature, its bounty, and the taiga. The white represents the color of snow, the purity of nature in the north, simplicity, and austerity, as well as Komi being a country in the north. According to a different interpretation, the white represents the equality and unity of the people and cultures living in Komi.
	2004–	Flag of Krasnodar Krai	Horizontal tricolour of blue, pink and green charged with the golden coat of arms
	2011–	Flag of the Mari El Republic	A white field with a ornament pattern on the hoist and the Mari coat of arms offset to the right.
	1995–	Flag of Mordovia	A horizontal tricolor of red, white and blue with an eight-pointed red cross.
	1995–	Flag of Moscow Municipality	Dark red background with its coat of arms on it
	1995–	Flag of Moscow Oblast	
	2005–	Flag of Nizhny Novgorod Oblast	
	1991–	Flag of North Ossetia–Alania	A tri-horizontal bar flag with the colors white, red, and yellow
	2022–	Flag of Penza Oblast	
	1996–	Flag of Rostov Oblast	
	1991–	Flag of Saint Petersburg	A red field charged in the centre with the arms of the city, which consists of two silver anchors (a fluked anchor, and a grapnel anchor), and a gold scepter.
	2000–	Flag of Sevastopol (Note: Controlled by Russia but recognised as part of Ukraine by most of the international community)	Seal of the city on a red field.
	1991–	Flag of Tatarstan	Red and green divided by a white fimbriation.
	1993–	Flag of the Udmurt Republic	The cross/star symbol represents the solar sign, a protective symbol that according to folklore protects man from misfortunes.
	2017–	Flag of Vladimir Oblast	
	2000–	Flag of Volgograd Oblast	Red field with two vertical stripes at the hoist, charged with the statue The Motherland Calls.

== San Marino ==
=== Castles ===
Castles have their own flag, as indicated by March 28th 1997 decree n°40. Article 2 demands each name to be indicated vertically at the hoist in peigmot font, but it is not enforced and it is usual see hoisted unnamed flags at public offices.

Acquaviva

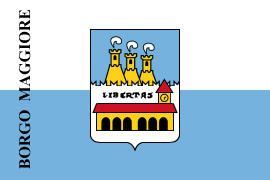
Borgo Maggiore

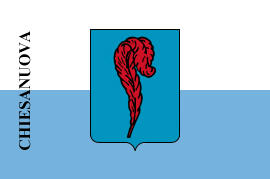
Chiesanuova

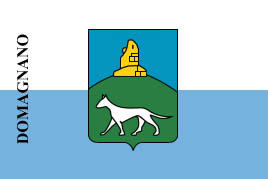
Domagnano

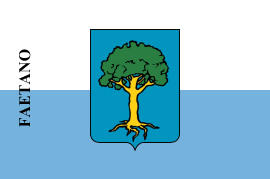
Faetano

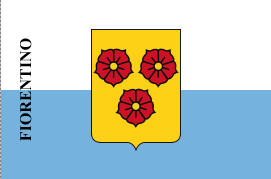
Fiorentino

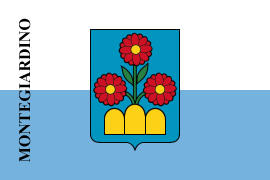
Montegiardino

San Marino

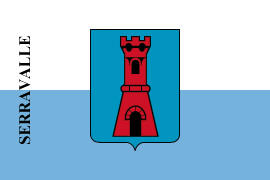
Serravalle

== Serbia ==
=== Autonomous provinces ===
Flag	Date	Use	Description
	2004–	Flag of Vojvodina	Horizontal tricolour of red, blue and white with larger blue portion and three yellow stars.
	1848–1849 (original design); 2015–	Traditional flag of Vojvodina	Horizontal tricolour of red, blue and white with a coat of arms.

== Slovakia ==
=== Regions ===
Flag	Administrative division	Adopted
	Banská Bystrica Region	
	Bratislava Region	
	Košice Region	
	Nitra Region	
	Prešov Region	
	Trenčín Region	
	Trnava Region	
	Žilina Region	

== Spain ==
=== Autonomous communities ===
Flag	Date	Use	Description
	1918–	Flag of Andalusia	The flag of Andalusia consists of a horizontal tricolour (green-white-green) with the Andalusian arms in the centre.
	1982–	Flag of Aragon	Nine stripes, alternating red and yellow, starting with yellow and the coat of arms of Aragon on the left half of the flag.
	1982–	Flag of Asturias	The flag of Asturias is light blue with the Victory Cross slightly left of the centre.
	1983–	Flag of the Balearic Islands	The flag of the Balearic Islands, made up of distinctive, historically legitimised symbols, will consist of four horizontal red bars over a yellow background, having an upper-left quarter with a purple background behind a centred white castle with five turrets.
	1978–	Flag of the Basque Country	A red field with the white central cross that extends to the edges of the flag superimposed on the green diagonal cross that extends to the corners of the flag.
	1984–	Flag of Cantabria	Two horizontal bands of same width, white on top, red on the bottom
	1982–	Flag of the Canary Islands	The flag of the Autonomous Community of the Canary Islands is a vertical tricolour of three equal bands of white, blue, and yellow. The state flag includes the Coat of arms of the Canary Islands in the central band; the civil flag omits this. The designs were made official by the Statute of Autonomy of the Canarian Autonomous Community (Organic Law 10/82) on 16 August 1982.
	1982–	Flag of Castilla–La Mancha	The flag of the region is made up of a rectangle divided vertically into two equal squares: the first, next to the mast, of crimson red with a castle of gold mauled of saber and ringed of blue and the second, white.
	(1230–1715); 1983–	Flag of Castile and León	It is formed by the combination of the historical flags of two of the oldest kingdom is the Iberian peninsula in the Middle Ages, the Kingdom of León (purple lion on silver in reference to the meaning of "león") and the Kingdom of Castile (golden castle on red in reference to the many castles that were erected all over the country). The joint historical flag dates back to mid 13th century when Ferdinand III, "the Saint", unified the two kingdoms in 1230, inaugurating the Kingdom of Castile and León, later named Crown of Castile.
	1150–	Flag of Catalonia	The flag of Catalonia consists four red bars on top of a yellow background. One popular (and unproven) legend mentions this flag originating with the streaking of 4 blood-stained fingers across a plain shield. The flag derives from the royal coat of arms of the historical royal family of the Crown of Aragon, House of Barcelona.
	1983–	Flag of Extremadura	Three horizontal stripes of green, white, and black, with a coat of arms in the center toward the hoist.
	19th century (official from 1984) –	Flag of Galicia	The flag of Galicia appeared for the first time in the 19th century, probably based on the colours of the ancient medieval flags of the Kingdom of Galicia. Originally, the flag was a blue St Andrew's Cross over a white field—St Andrew is one of the most popular saints in Galicia. The coat of arms of Galicia was the former flag of the Kingdom of Galicia. Colors blue, white and gold were always related with Galicia. The chalice and the golden crosses on blue background have been its symbol since medieval times (13th century). For some time it was thought that it was based on the flag of the maritime province of Corunna, but today it is known that the design is earlier.
	1982–	Flag of La Rioja	Four horizontal bands of equal size, with the colors of red, white, green, and yellow, with a coat of arms in the center of the flag.
	1983–	Flag of the Community of Madrid	The seven stars represent the stars of the constellation Ursa Minor. They're five-pointed because they represent the five Spanish provinces which surround the Community of Madrid.
	1982–	Flag of the Region of Murcia	The flag of the Region of Murcia is rectangular and consists of four castles with battlements or, in the upper left corner, arranged in rows of two, and seven royal crowns in the lower right corner, arranged in four rows, with a pattern of one, three, two, and one, respectively; against a crimson or carmine red background
	1982–	Flag of Navarre	The flag of Navarre is red-colored, with a shield in the center.
	1982–	Flag of the Valencian Community	The traditional Senyera, composed of four red bars on a yellow background, crowned with a blue strip party per pale next to the hoist.

== Sweden ==
=== Regions ===
Flag	Status	Use	Description
	Semi-official	The traditional province of Skåne (Scania)	
	Official	Skåne County (Scania)	Also a similar flag exists with blue background for Scania region
	Unofficial	The county of Jämtland	Jamtland (that belonged to Norway until 1645) has its own movement for the Republic of Jamtland – not a serious attempt for independence but more a touch of humor and local culture. The flag however is used in the area.
	Official	Jämtland County	Compare unofficial above. Jämtland modern county includes the two traditional provinces Jämtland and Härjedalen.
	Unofficial	The traditional province of Småland	Småland is a relatively large traditional province in the south of Sweden that today is divided in 3 administrative counties and also with 2 smaller areas outside these 3 counties.
	Official	Kronoberg County	Part of historical province of Småland (see above)
	Official	Jönköping County	Part of historical province of Småland (see above)
	Official	Kalmar County	Part of historical province of Småland (see above) and the island province Öland (see below).
	Unofficial	The historical province and island Öland outside Småland in the Baltic Sea	Öland (Swedish means "The Island Land") has a long history and different nature compared to the main land of Sweden. Öland is the second largest island in Sweden.
	Unofficial	The traditional province Östergötland	The blue cross relates to the two main channels and the yellow to agricultural flat areas. Not much in use.
	Official	Östergötland County	Compare unofficial above.
	Official	Västra Götaland County	Flag includes arms/flags from the 4 traditional provinces (Västergötland, Bohuslän, Dalsland and Älvsborg) that are included in this relatively newly formed regional county.
	Unofficial	The traditional province Västergötland	Not much in use. Also compare the previous flag above that covers the same area and more.
	Official	Blekinge County	The coat of arms for the traditional province of Blekinge and the administrative Blekinge county. Not much in use.
	Official	Halland County	There is a geographical difference between the administrative Halland county and the traditional Halland province.
	Official	Värmland County	There is a geographical difference between the administrative Värmland county and the traditional Värmland province.
	Official	Örebro County	The Örebro county includes the traditional province Närke and parts of traditional provinces of Värmland and Västmanland. The flag includes arms from these 3 counties.
	Official	Södermanland County	The administrative Södermanland County includes parts (southern part) of traditional Södermanland County
	Official	Uppsala County	The administrative Uppsala County includes parts (northern part) of traditional Uppland Province
	Official	Stockholm County	The administrative Stockholm County includes parts (southern part) of traditional Uppland County and (northern part) of traditional Södermanland province. the flag includes arms from these both counties and also the arms of Stockholm city.
	Official	Gotland County	The administrative Gotland County consists of one main and a number of smaller islands in the Baltic sea. This is the only county in Sweden that only has one municipality.
	Official	Västmanland County	The administrative Västmanland County includes parts of traditional Västmanland province
	Official	Dalarna County	This county was earlier known as Kopparbergs county and even earlier as Dalarna Province
	Official	Gävleborg County	Gävleborg administrative County encompasses the traditional provinces of Gästrikland and Hälsingland.
	Official	Västernorrland County	Västernorrland administrative county covers approximately the traditional province of Ångermanland and the traditional province of Medelpad.
	Official	Västerbotten County	Västerbotten administrative county covers the traditional province of Västerbotten and parts of the traditional province Swedish Lapland and traditional province of Ångermanland.
	Official	Norrbotten County	Norrbotten County includes the traditional province of Norrbotten and about two-thirds of the traditional province of Swedish Lapland.
	Unofficial	Coastal area of Roslagen	Roslagen is the name of the coastal areas of Uppland province in Sweden, which also constitutes the northern part of the Stockholm archipelago. Norrtälje is sometimes named the capital city of Roslagen.

Each official flag is based on the coat of arms for the county, see gallery, and used on buildings etc. used by respective county administration. Unofficial flags are used by private and local people.

== Switzerland ==
=== Cantons ===
Flag	Date	Use	Description
	1289–	Flag of Bern	A red field a yellow diagonal band charged with a black bear with a red tongue, claws walking upwards toward the hoist.
	15th century –	Flag of Geneva	The flag of Geneva is the historical flag of the city of Geneva, showing the Imperial Eagle and a Key of St. Peter (symbolizing the status of Geneva as Reichsstadt and as episcopal seat, respectively), in use since the 15th century.
		Flag of Glarus	Gules, a pilgrim walking towards the dexter argent, habited sable, holding in his dexter hand a staff, in his sinister hand a bible, and above his head a halo.
	1386–	Flag of Lucerne	
	1803–	Flag of St. Gallen	A white upright fasces with the axe blade facing the hoist on green field.
	1240–	Flag of Schwyz	A white banner with a cross on the top-left
	13th century –	Flag of Uri	A bull's head seen face on, with a red tongue and a red nose ring, on a yellow field.
	1803–	Flag of Vaud	
	1220 (?)–	Flag of Zürich	

== Ukraine ==
=== Regions ===
Flag	Date	Use	Description
	1998–	Flag of Cherkasy Oblast	The larger half of it has a dark blue color, which on the center features the oblast's coat of arms.
	2000–	Flag of Chernihiv Oblast	The flag is a rectangular green panel with an aspect ratio of 2:3, the middle of which is a white horizontal stripe (width 1/5 of the flag's width), and in the upper pole of the white square shows the emblem area.
	2001–	Flag of Chernivtsi Oblast	On the flag, there is a rectangular panel with a ratio of 2:3. From the top and bottom edges are blue-and-yellow stripes. The width of the blue strip equals 1/10 of a flag's total width, and the yellow stripes width equals 1/30 of the flag's width. At the center of the flag is a white falcon on a green background. The falcons height equals 1/2 of the height of the flag.
	1999–	Flag of Crimea	A horizontal tricolor of a thin blue stripe, a large white stripe, and thin red stripe. Controlled by Russia but recognised as part of Ukraine by most of the international community.
	1999–	Flag of Donetsk Oblast	A rising gold sun with 12 sunbeams and five gold ovals one under another
	2002–	Flag of Dnipropetrovsk Oblast	The flag is a rectangle divided by a diagonal stripe into a blue part (upper right) and a white part (lower left). The images on the flag reproduce the graphic elements of the coat of arms of the Dnipropetrovsk region, they are: nine stars on the blue part and a Cossack with musket on the left part. The flag's dividing line consists of repeating wave patterns: yellow at the top and blue at the bottom.
	2001–	Flag of Ivano-Frankivsk Oblast	White field with a black jackdaw. Both the vertical edges are decorated by two different narrow bicolors.
	1999–	Flag of Kharkiv Oblast	Coat of arms of Kharkiv on Crimson field
	2001–	Flag of Kherson Oblast	A rectangular panel with an aspect ratio of 2:3 is divided by three horizontal stripes - blue, white and blue - in a ratio of 1:2:1. On the white stripe near the pole is the coat of arms of the Oblast.
	2002–	Flag of Khmelnytskyi Oblast	
	1998–	Flag of Kirovohrad Oblast	It is divided into two vertical stripes: raspberry on the left and yellow on the right. On the raspberry stripe is the coat of arms: an image of a yellow steppe eagle, which is based on a golden statuette found in the Scythian Melgunov Kurgan.
	1995–	Flag of Kyiv	An azure field with a yellow border with Archangel Michael centered on the flag.
	1999–	Flag of Kyiv Oblast	
	1998–	Flag of Luhansk Oblast	Oblast coat of arms in top left corner, surrounded by seventeen yellow and fourteen white stars
	2001–	Flag of Lviv Oblast	Yellow lion on a blue field
	2026–	Flag of Mykolaiv Oblast	
	2002–	Flag of Odesa Oblast	
	2000–	Flag of Poltava Oblast	Yellow Cossack cross on a blue field
	2005–	Flag of Rivne Oblast	
	2000–	Flag of Sevastopol	Seal of the city. Controlled by Russia but recognised as part of Ukraine by most of the international community.
	2000–	Flag of Sumy Oblast	Oblast coat of arms on blue field
	2003–	Flag of Ternopil Oblast	A rectangular blue banner with an aspect ratio of 2:3, a yellow sword and a key placed in the middle, and three white towers with yellow accents above them.
	1997–	Flag of Vinnytsia Oblast	A blue rectangular banner with an aspect ratio of 2:3. In the center of the flag are the coats of arms of Podolia, the golden sun, and the Bratslav region (Eastern Podolia), a silver cross with a blue shield with a silver crescent. Two red stripes are placed horizontally in the upper and lower parts at a distance of 1/10 from the edge of the canvas and 1/10 of the width.
	2004–	Flag of Volyn Oblast	In the center on a red (color of ripe cherry) background is an isosceles cross of white (silver) color, touching the ends of the edges of the flag. In the upper left corner is one of the oldest versions of the historical crosses of Volhynia of the 15th to the 18th century centuries (so-called Cross pattée).
	2001–	Flag of Zaporizhzhia Oblast	
	2009–	Flag of Zakarpattia Oblast	
	2003–	Flag of Zhytomyr Oblast	

== United Kingdom ==
=== Countries ===
Flag	Date	Use	Description
	16th century –	Flag of England	England is one of the home nations that forms the United Kingdom. The St George's Cross is the customary national flag.
	1953–1973	Flag of Northern Ireland	Northern Ireland is one of the home nations that forms the United Kingdom. The 'Ulster Banner' (Ulster Scots: Ulstèr Bannèr; Irish: Meirge Uladh) was the official flag of Northern Ireland between 1953 and 1973, however, its use is now unofficial and Northern Ireland lacks a unique official flag.
	14th century –	Flag of Scotland	Scotland is one of the home nations that forms the United Kingdom. The 'Saltire' is the official national flag.
	9th century –	Flag of Wales	Wales is one of the home nations that forms the United Kingdom. The Red Dragon (Welsh: Y Ddraig Goch) is the official national flag. The Welsh dragon has ancient origins, but was first officially flown in the modern era in 1959.

=== Crown Dependencies ===
Flag	Date	Use	Description
	1993–present	Flag of Alderney	A red cross on a white field (St George's Cross) with an inescutcheon of the island's coat of arms. Alderney is an autonomous Crown Dependency and is part of the Bailiwick of Guernsey.
	1985–present	Flag of Guernsey	A golden cross within a red cross on a white field (St George's Cross). Guernsey is an autonomous Crown Dependency and is part of the Bailiwick of Guernsey.
	c.1953–present	Flag of Herm	A red cross on a white field (St George's Cross) with the coat of arms of the island in the canton. Herm is an island which belongs to the Bailiwick of Guernsey.
	1931–present	Flag of the Isle of Man	A triskelion on a red field.
	1981–present	Flag of Jersey	A red saltire on a white field defaced with the island's badge
	1938–present	Flag of Sark	A red cross on a white field (St George's Cross) with two lions (the arms of the Plantagenet Dukes of Normandy) in the canton. Strictly speaking, this was the personal flag of the Seigneur. Sark is an autonomous Crown Dependency and is part of the Bailiwick of Guernsey.

=== Islands ===
Flag	Date	Use	Description
	2017 on	Flag of the Isle of Barra	Green, with a white Scandinavian Cross showing the ancestry of the people and places names of Barra. The green represents the green of the Barra Isles.
	September 9, 1976	Flag of the Comhairle nan Eilean Siar (Council of the Western Isles)	Or, on a fess wavy Azure between three lymphads, oars in action, sails furled Sable, flagged Gules, two barrulets wavy Argent.
	1954–1969; 2010 on	Flag of Lundy	A blue flag with a white letter "L" on the hoist side.
	2007 on	Flag of Orkney	A blue Nordic cross outlined in yellow on a red field.
	14 April 2010	Flag of the Isle of Portland (Registered by the Flag Institute)	The colours represent the landscape of the area: Portland stone, grass and the sea. The white tower represents the castles and the naval coronet shows the long connection with the Royal Navy.
	February 2002	Flag of the Isles of Scilly	The Scillonian Cross
	2017 on	Flag of South Uist	A green flag bearing a blue Nordic cross fimbriated in white
	1969 on	Flag of Shetland	A white Nordic cross on a light blue field
	2020 on	Flag of the Isle of Skye	A yellow Hebridean Birlinn in upper hoist above a yellow Nordic Cross on a sky blue field interlaced with a white ring.
	2009 on	Flag of the Isle of Wight	A pale blue field with a nicked rhombus (a representation of the island's shape) and at the bottom six alternating bars wavy, navy blue and white.

=== Overseas territories ===
Flag	Date	Use	Description
	1990–present	Anguilla	A Blue Ensign defaced with the Coat of arms of Anguilla
		Flag used in Akrotiri and Dhekelia	The Union Jack is used as no territory flag exists
	2013–present	Ascension Island, a constituent part of Saint Helena, Ascension and Tristan da Cunha	A Blue Ensign defaced with the Coat of arms of Ascension Island
	1999–present	Bermuda	A Red Ensign defaced with the Coat of arms of Bermuda. Used on land and as the civil ensign. (Government ensign is blue.)
	1999–present	Bermuda	A Blue Ensign defaced with the Coat of arms of Bermuda. Used as the Government ensign.
	1963–present	British Antarctic Territory	A White Ensign less the cross of St George defaced with the Coat of arms of the British Antarctic Territory
	1963–present	British Antarctic Territory	A Blue Ensign defaced with the Coat of arms of the British Antarctic Territory
	1990–present	British Indian Ocean Territory	A Blue Ensign with white wavy lines, defaced with the Coat of arms of the British Indian Ocean Territory.
	1960–present	British Virgin Islands	A Blue Ensign defaced with the Coat of arms of the British Virgin Islands. Used on land and as the government ensign. The civil ensign is red.
	1960–present	British Virgin Islands	A Red Ensign defaced with the Coat of arms of the British Virgin Islands. Used on land and as the civil ensign.
	1999–present	Cayman Islands	A Blue Ensign defaced with the Coat of arms of the Cayman Islands. Used on land and as the government ensign. The civil ensign is red.
	1999–present	Cayman Islands	A Red Ensign defaced with the Coat of arms of the Cayman Islands. Used on land and as the civil ensign.
	1999–present	Falkland Islands	A Blue Ensign defaced with the Coat of arms of the Falkland Islands. Used on land and as the government ensign. The civil ensign is red.
	1999–present	Falkland Islands	A Red Ensign defaced with the Coat of arms of the Falkland Islands. Used on land and as the civil ensign.
	1982–present	Gibraltar	Two horizontal bands of white (top, double width) and red with a three-towered red castle in the centre of the white band; hanging from the castle gate is a gold key centred in the red band. This is the flag commonly used on land.
	1999–present	Gibraltar	A Blue Ensign defaced with the badge of Gibraltar in the fly. This is the ensign for vessels owned by the Government, or in Government service.
	1996–present	Gibraltar	A Red Ensign defaced with the badge of Gibraltar in the fly. Used as the civil ensign for locally registered vessel.
	1958–present	Montserrat	A Blue Ensign defaced with the Coat of arms of Montserrat
	1984–present	Pitcairn Islands	A Blue Ensign defaced with the Coat of arms of the Pitcairn Islands
	1984–present	Saint Helena, a constituent part of Saint Helena, Ascension and Tristan da Cunha	A Blue Ensign defaced with the Coat of arms of Saint Helena
	1985–present	South Georgia and the South Sandwich Islands	A Blue Ensign defaced with the Coat of arms of South Georgia and the South Sandwich Islands
	2002–present	Tristan da Cunha, a constituent part of Saint Helena, Ascension and Tristan da Cunha	A Blue Ensign defaced with the Coat of arms of Tristan da Cunha
	1968–present	Turks and Caicos Islands	A Blue Ensign defaced with the Coat of arms of the Turks and Caicos Islands
	1968–present	Turks and Caicos Islands	A Red Ensign defaced with the Coat of arms of the Turks and Caicos Islands
