= Flags of the regions of Ukraine =

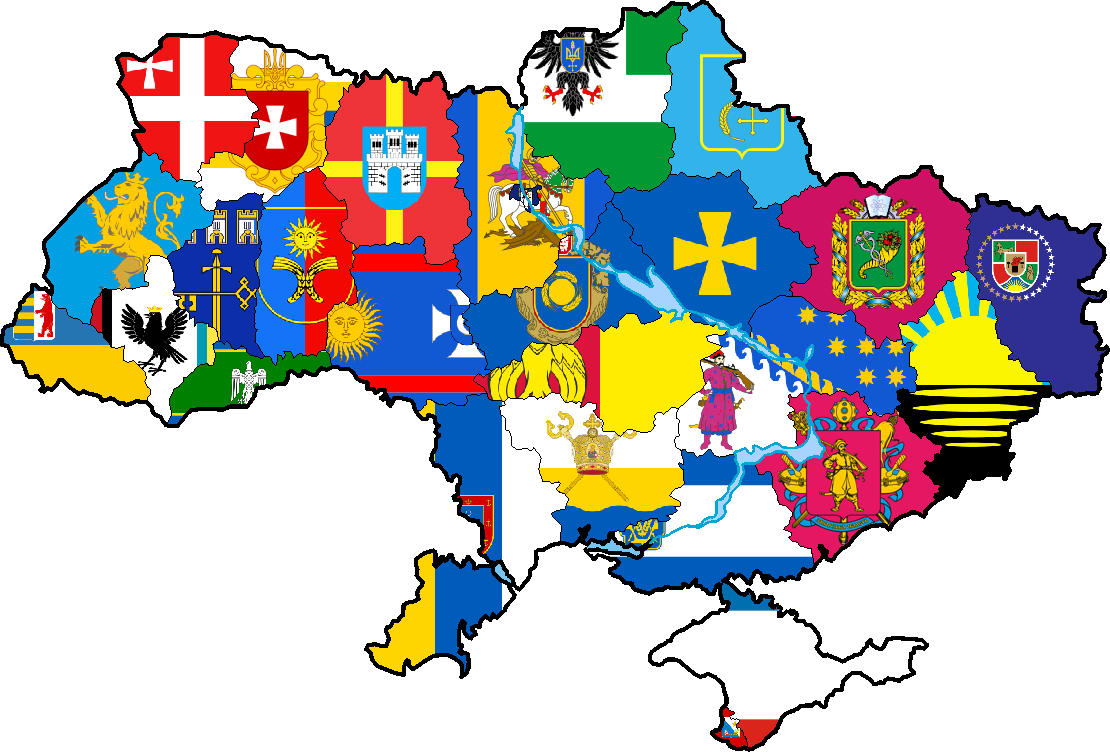
Map of Ukraine with regions flags

The flags of the subdivisions of Ukraine exhibit a wide variety of regional influences and local histories, reflecting different styles and design principles. Most local flags were designed and adopted after Ukrainian independence in 1991.

== Flags of Ukrainian oblasts ==
Flag of Cherkasy Oblast

Flag of Chernivtsi Oblast

Flag of Chernihiv Oblast

Flag of Dnipropetrovsk Oblast

Flag of Donetsk Oblast

Flag of Ivano-Frankivsk Oblast

Flag of Kharkiv Oblast

Flag of Kherson Oblast

Flag of Khmelnytskyi Oblast

Flag of Kirovohrad Oblast

Flag of Kyiv Oblast

Flag of Luhansk Oblast

Flag of Lviv Oblast

Flag of Mykolaiv Oblast

Flag of Odesa Oblast

Flag of Poltava Oblast

Flag of Rivne Oblast

Flag of Sumy Oblast

Flag of Ternopil Oblast

Flag of Vinnytsia Oblast

Flag of Volyn Oblast

Flag of Zaporizhia Oblast

Flag of Zakarpattia Oblast

Flag of Zhytomyr Oblast

== Flag of Autonomous Republic ==
Flag of Crimea

== Flags of Cities with Special Status ==
Flag of Kyiv

Flag of Sevastopol

== Historical ==
=== Flags of Ukrainian Oblasts ===
Flag of Mykolaiv Oblast (2001–2026)

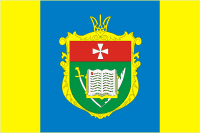
Flag of Rivne Oblast (2001–2005)

Flag of Ternopil Oblast (2001–2003)

=== Flags of Ruthenian Lands in the Battle of Tannenberg, 1410 ===
Przemyśl Land

Grand Duchy of Lithuania

Grand Duchy of Lithuania

Ruthenian Voivodeship

Lwów land

Podol Land

Halych Land

== See also ==
- Coats of arms of the regions of Ukraine
- Flag of Ukraine
- List of Ukrainian flags
