= Flag of Kharkiv Oblast =

Ukrainian oblast flag

- Use: Civil and state flag
- Proportion: 2:3
- Adopted: May 11, 1999
- Design: Coat of arms of Kharkiv on a dark pink field

The Flag of Kharkiv Oblast is the official flag of the Kharkiv Oblast as approved by the VI session of the XXIII convocation of the Kharkiv Oblast Council on May 11, 1999.

== Design ==
Original variant with scroll reading KHARKIV OBLAST

The Oblast flag is a rectangular cloth (width to length ratio 2: 3) of crimson color with an image in the central part of the region's coat of arms. The height of the shield is 1/2 the width of the flag. The flag is double-sided. The top of the pole is a metal cone 1/10 of the width of the flag, the base of the cone is equal to two times the diameter of the pole. It is fixed on a cylindrical base with a height of 1/20 of the flag's width. The color of the metal from which the top is made is silver.

The reference model of the flag is kept in the office of the speaker of the Oblast Council.

== History ==
During the rule of the Tsardom of Russia, Russian Empire, and Soviet Union, Kharkiv did not have its own flag. However, from either 1651 or 1659 to 1765, the city was the regimental center for the Kharkiv Regiment, which had its own flag, which was used at times to represent the region.

Flag of the Kharkiv Regiment

The banner consisted of a cross in a glow and above it two angels with trumpets holding a crown.

== Administrative Subdivisions ==
=== Berestyn Raion ===
Flags of the Berestyn Raion
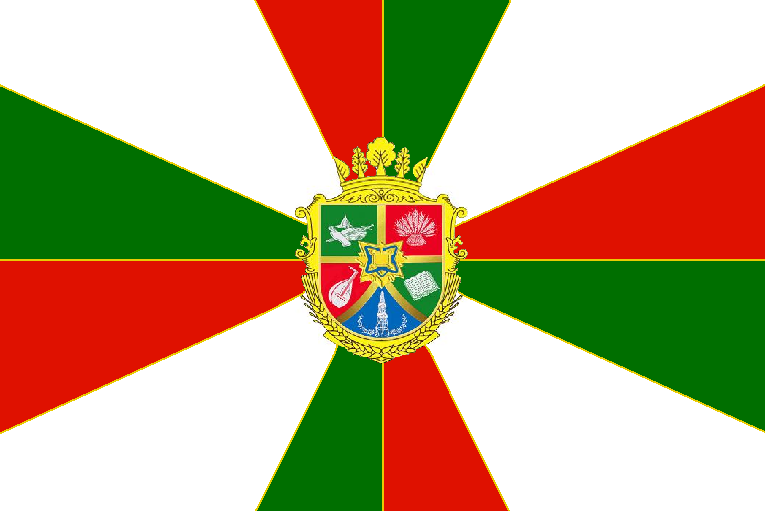
Berestyn Raion

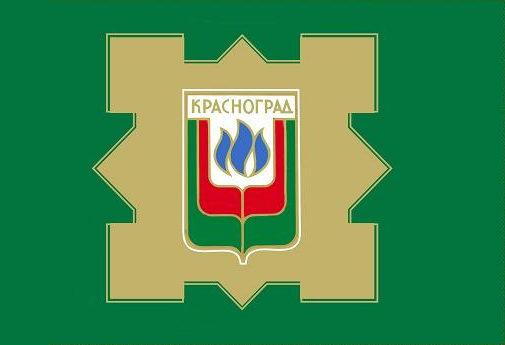
Berestyn City

=== Bohodukhiv Raion ===
Flags of the Bohodukhiv Raion
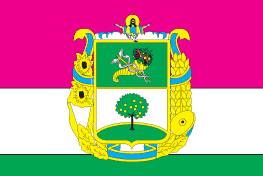
Bohodukhiv Raion

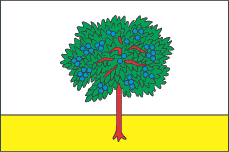
Bohodukhiv City

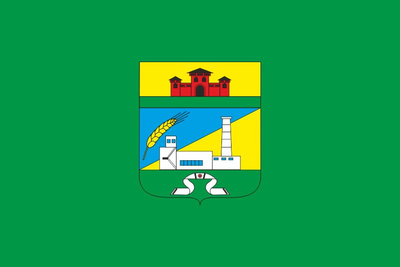
Kolomak Settlement

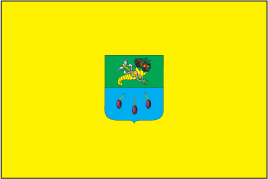
Valky Settlement

Zolochiv Settlement

=== Chuhuiv Raion ===
Flags of the Chuhuiv Raion
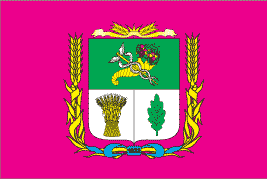
Chuhuiv Raion

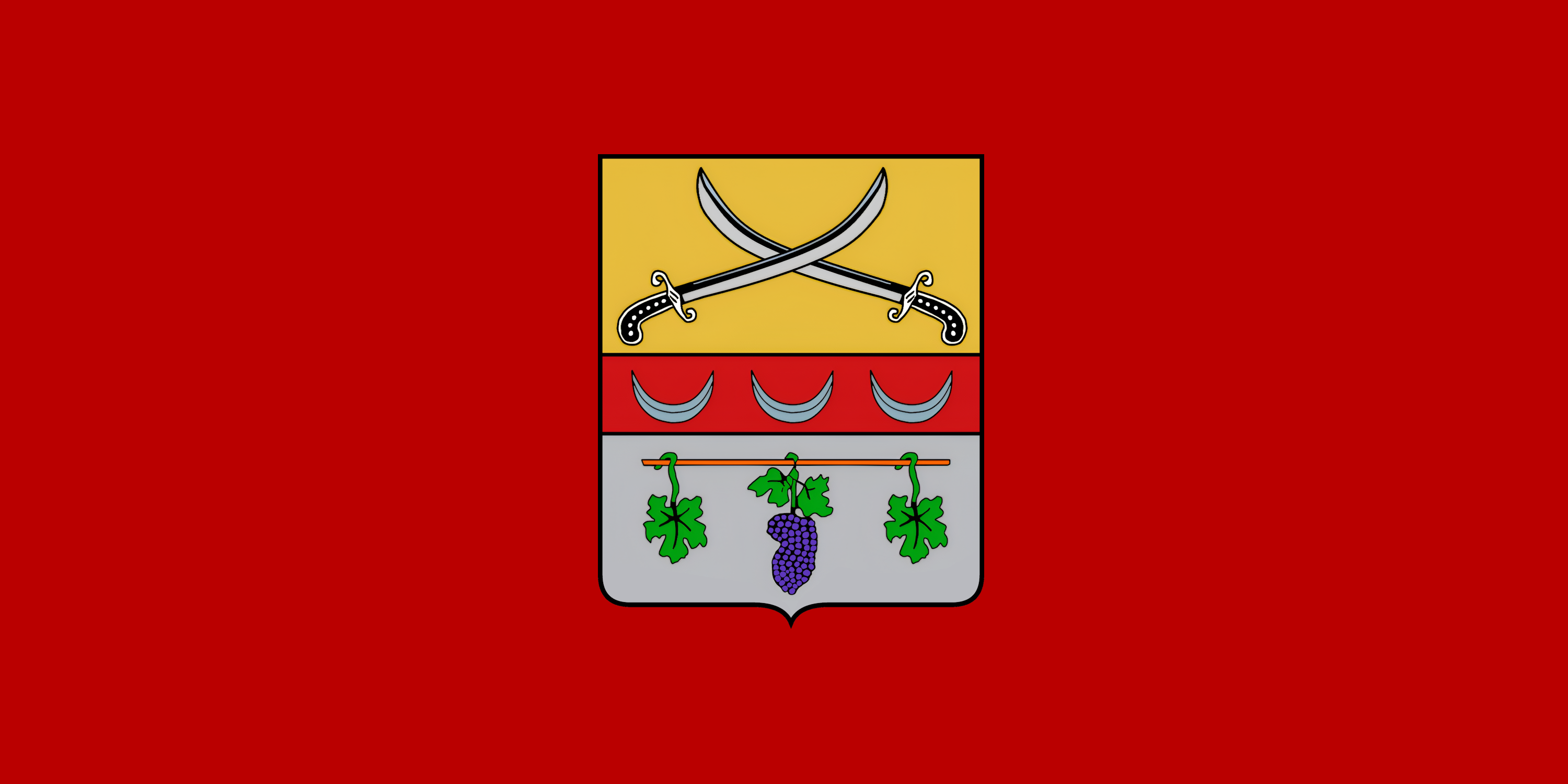
Chuhuiv City

Vovchansk City

=== Izium Raion ===
Flags of the Izium Raion
Izium Raion, Izium City

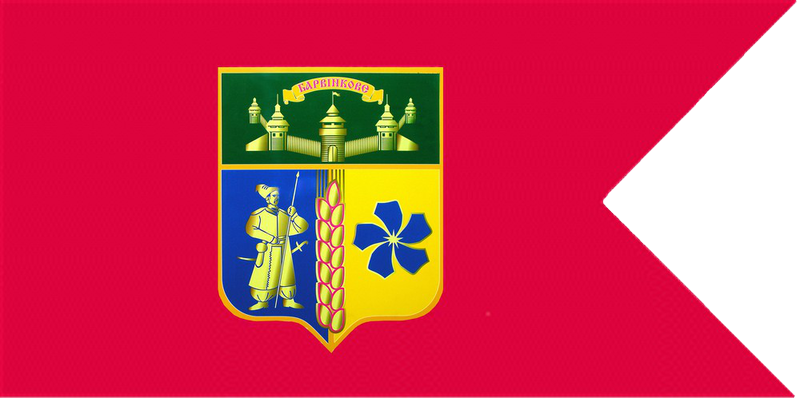
Barvinkove City

=== Kharkiv Raion ===
Flags of the Kharkiv Raion
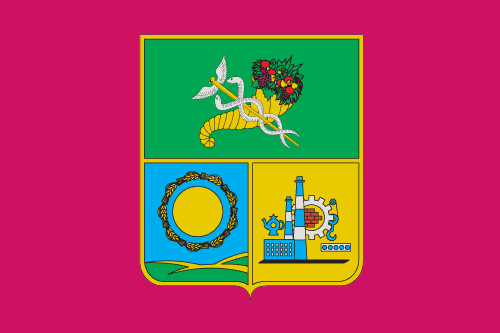
Kharkiv Raion

Kharkiv City

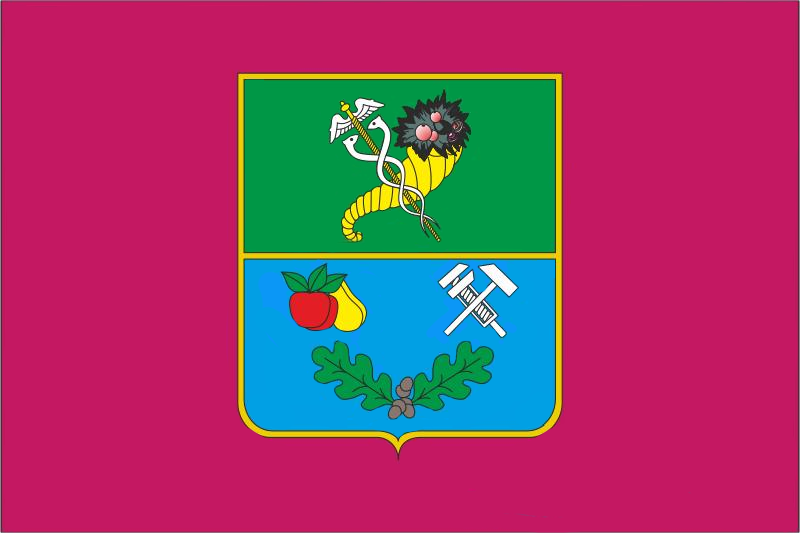
Liubotyn City

Pisochyn Settlement

=== Kupiansk Raion ===
Flags of the Kupiansk Raion
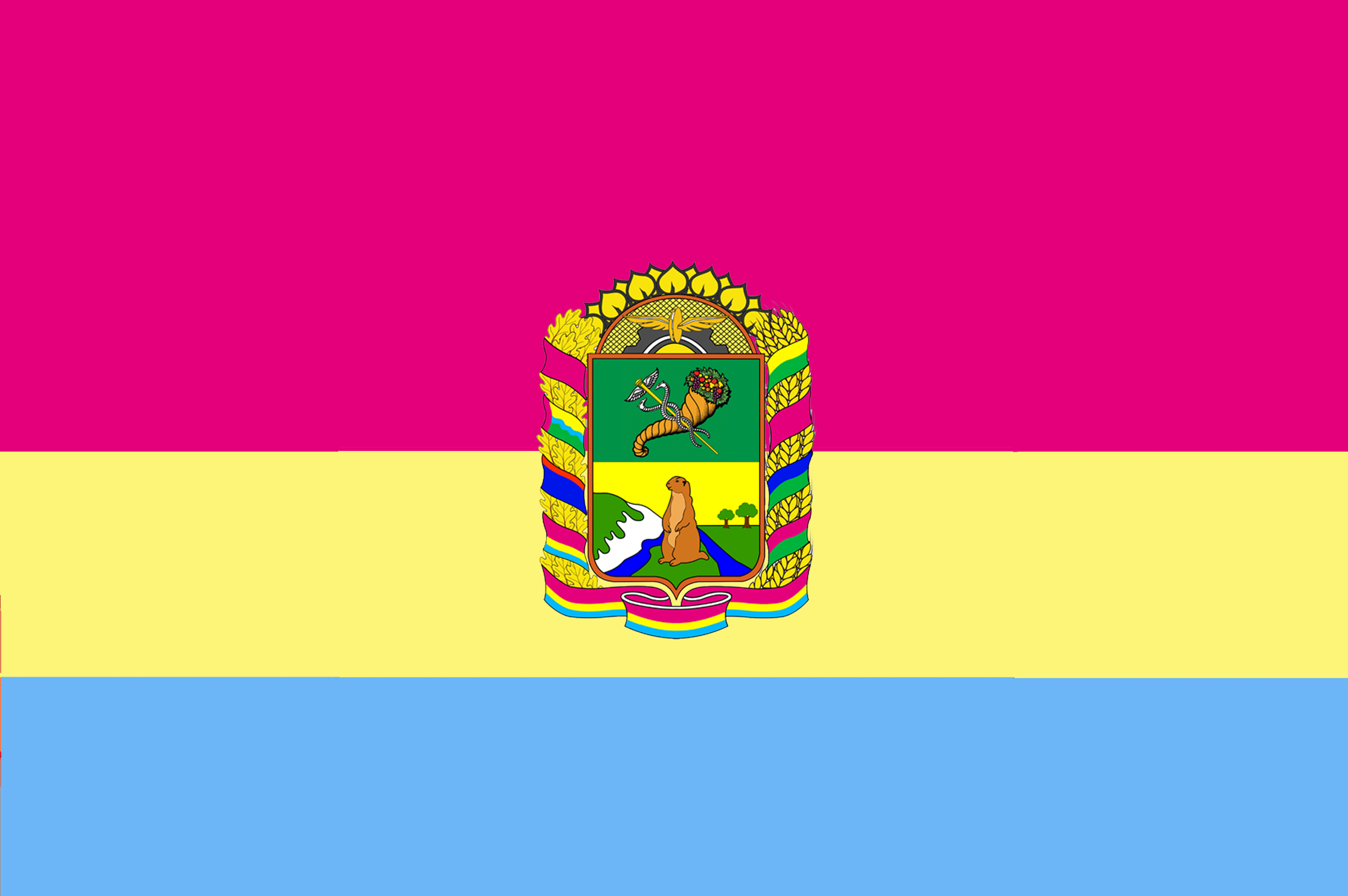
Kupiansk Raion

Kupiansk City

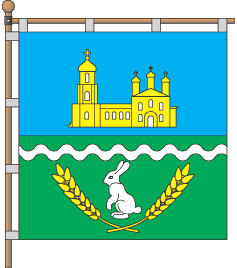
Petropavlivka Village

=== Lozova Raion ===
Flags of the Lozova Raion
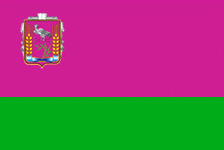
Lozova Raion

Lozova City

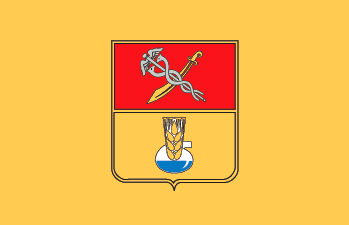
Zlatopil City

== See also ==
- Flag of the Kharkiv People's Republic, and Russian occupation of the Oblast
