= Flag of Saint Petersburg =

Saint Petersburg
- Proportion: 2:3
- Adopted: 6 September 1991

The flag of Saint Petersburg, in the Russian Federation, is a red field charged in the centre with the arms of the city, which consists of two silver anchors (a fluked anchor, and a grapnel anchor), and a gold scepter with the coat of arms of Russia.

The anchors both cross each other at their centers, with the sea anchor to the left and the river anchor on the right. They reflect the fact that the city has both river and sea ports. The scepter is surmounted on the anchors in the centre. It shows that the city was the former capital of Russia.

The flag was adopted on 6 September 1991 and the proportions are 2:3.
