= Coat of arms of Saint Petersburg =

Versions
- Lesser coat of arms of Saint Petersburg

- Brandmark
- Armiger: Alexander Beglov, Governor of Saint Petersburg
- Adopted: 1730; re-enacted in 1991; current version since 2003

The coat of arms of Saint Petersburg is the official symbol of the city. It is used for official seals, documents, and awards, and is displayed in locations including city government buildings, municipal transportation hubs, some street signs, and signage indicating the city border. The current version was adopted on April 23, 2003.

== History ==
The coats of arms of the Holy See and Vatican City (the original "city of St. Peter") served as the prototype for the coat of arms of St. Petersburg.

The historical coat of arms of St. Petersburg was originally approved in 1730, confirmed in 1780, and amended in 1856. It ceased to be used following the October Revolution in 1917, as depicting symbols of the Russian Empire did not align with Soviet ideology. When the city was renamed to Leningrad, the coat of arms was revised to incorporate the ship at the top of the Admiralty building spire. The historical crest was not reinstated until 1991, with the dissolution of the Soviet Union and the renaming of the city back to St. Petersburg.

The current coat of arms was adopted on 23 April 2003.

Coat of arms of Saint Petersburg in 1730–1856 (reused in 1991–2003)

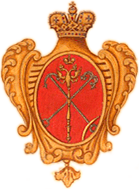
Coat of arms of Saint Petersburg in 1735

Coat of arms of Saint Petersburg, 1856 - 1917

Coat of arms of Leningrad

Coat of arms of Saint Petersburg from 2003

== Description ==
The coat of arms of Saint Petersburg is a red heraldic shield with a field featuring two silver anchors. The Maritime anchor is oriented diagonally from left to right from the viewer, with two legs in the upper left corner, and the River anchor mirrors its position, with four legs in the upper right corner. Above them is a golden scepter with a double-headed eagle. The shield is crowned with the Russian imperial crown with two St. Andrew azure ribbons emerging from it. Behind the shield two are crosswise gold scepters adorned with diamonds connected by St Andrew azure ribbons. There is no motto written on the ribbons.

The heraldic description of the coat of arms of St. Petersburg reads, in Russian: "In a red field, a gold Russian scepter atop two tilted silver anchors (sea and river, with four prongs), crossed over each other. The shield is crowned with the Russian imperial crown and set upon two Russian scepters in natural colors, connected by the ribbon of Saint Andrew the Apostle."

The coat of arms of St Petersburg may also be reproduced in abbreviated versions, for both historical and heraldic purposes. The imperial crown can be omitted, as can its ribbons, along with the two Russian scepters and double-headed eagle but the two silver anchors - sea and river, laid crosswise remain constant.

The scepters represent the rulers of St Petersburg. In this case, a scepter surmounted by an eagle symbolised monarchical royal power, and that St. Petersburg was the capital of the Russian Empire. The two silver anchors, one of which was two-bladed with a cross in the ring representing the sea, and the other, with four blades and a ring representing the river, meant that the city was both a sea and river port. The red of the shield recalls the bloody battles against the Swedes in the Great Northern War.

== See also ==
- Flag of Saint Petersburg
