= Melgunov Kurgan =

7th century BC burial mound in Ukraine

Coordinates: 48°43′28.9″N 32°22′50″E

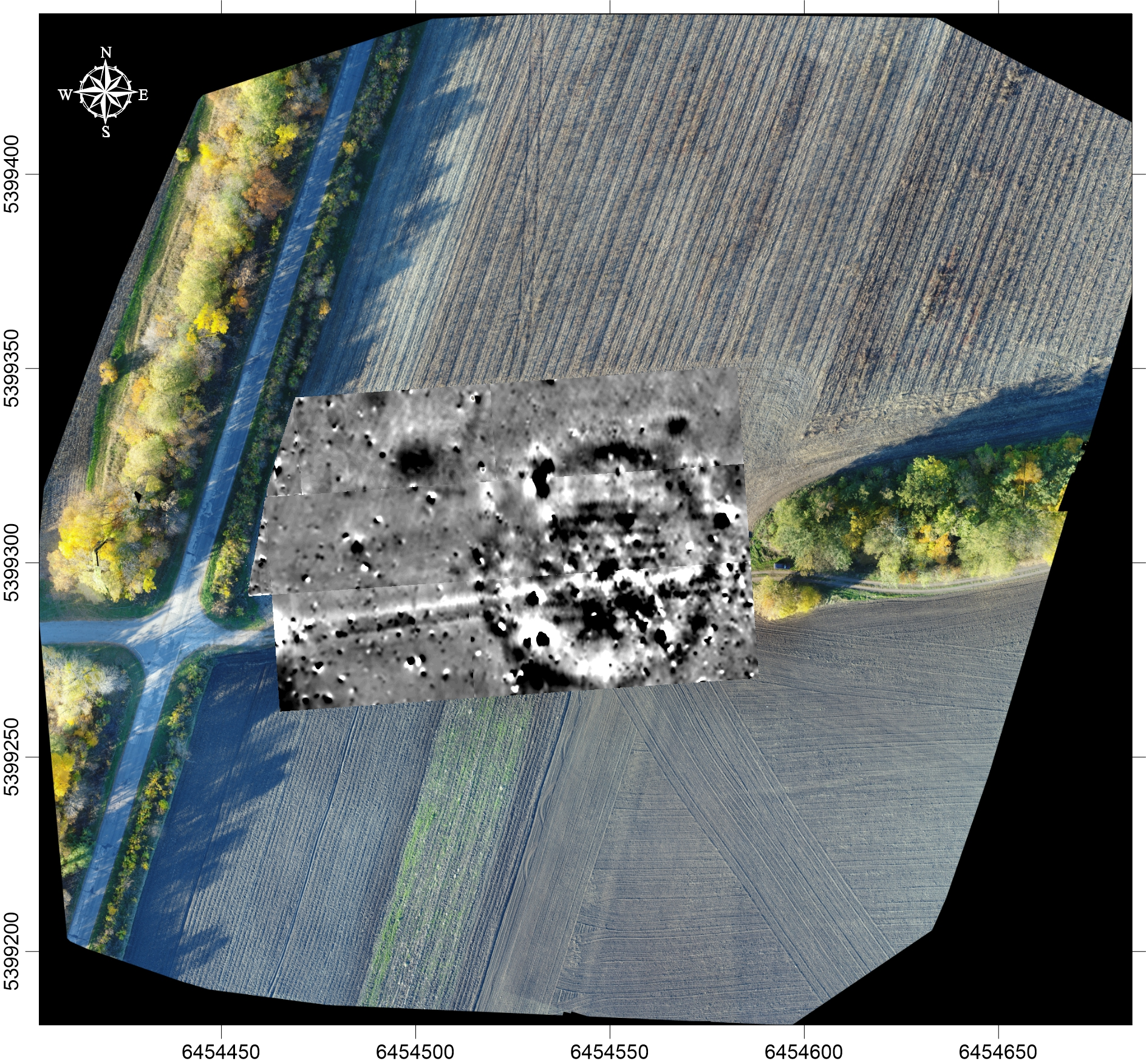
Magnetic field anomaly map of the site of the Melgunov Kurgan prior to its restoration

Melgunov Kurgan (Ukrainian: Мельгунівський курган), also known as Lyta Grave (Ukrainian: Лита могила), is one of the oldest Scythian kurgans (burial mounds) from 7th century BC.

== History ==
The kurgan was excavated in September 1763 near the village of Kopani (nowadays located in Kropyvnytskyi Raion, Kirovohrad Oblast). The work was carried out on the instructions of Oleksiy Melgunov (after which the kurgan was named), who would later become the general governor of Novorossiya Governorate. It was investigated by Vladimir Yastrebov in 1892 and Ninel Bokiy in 1990. Excavations were also done by Y. Boltryk in 2019. Information about the excavations is fragmentary and contradictory.

It was established that the kurgan was built in 7th century BC and modified in 4th century BC. The mound is about 10.5 m tall. The kurgan consists of burnt slagged soil with the remains of melted metals, burnt bones, stones, earth, and clay mixed with coal. The use of fire was a part of the funeral rite.

Golden jewelry and sword decorations were found in the kurgan, and they are currently stored in Hermitage Museum and Kharkiv Historical Museum (although a large part of the collection was destroyed during World War II bombings). At the depth of 2 m, multiple items were found under stone slabs: an acinaces with a golden hilt and a gold-plated wooden scabbard decorated with images of fantastic animals, a golden diadem, silver details of an Assyrian palace stool, 17 gold plates depicting an eagle with hinges on the back, a plate with images of monkeys and birds, a bronze clasp with images of lion heads, 40 bronze arrowheads, rings, and other objects. The items did not have any traces of fire.

== Significance ==
Coat of arms of Kirovohrad Oblast

The site has outstanding significance, as it is the only known Scythian royal mound of the time in the Northern Black Sea region. In 2020, the kurgan's mound was restored and a memorial sign was installed. The image of the eagle from the golden plates found in the kurgan is depicted on the coat of arms of Kirovohrad Oblast, which is also features on its flag.

== Gallery ==
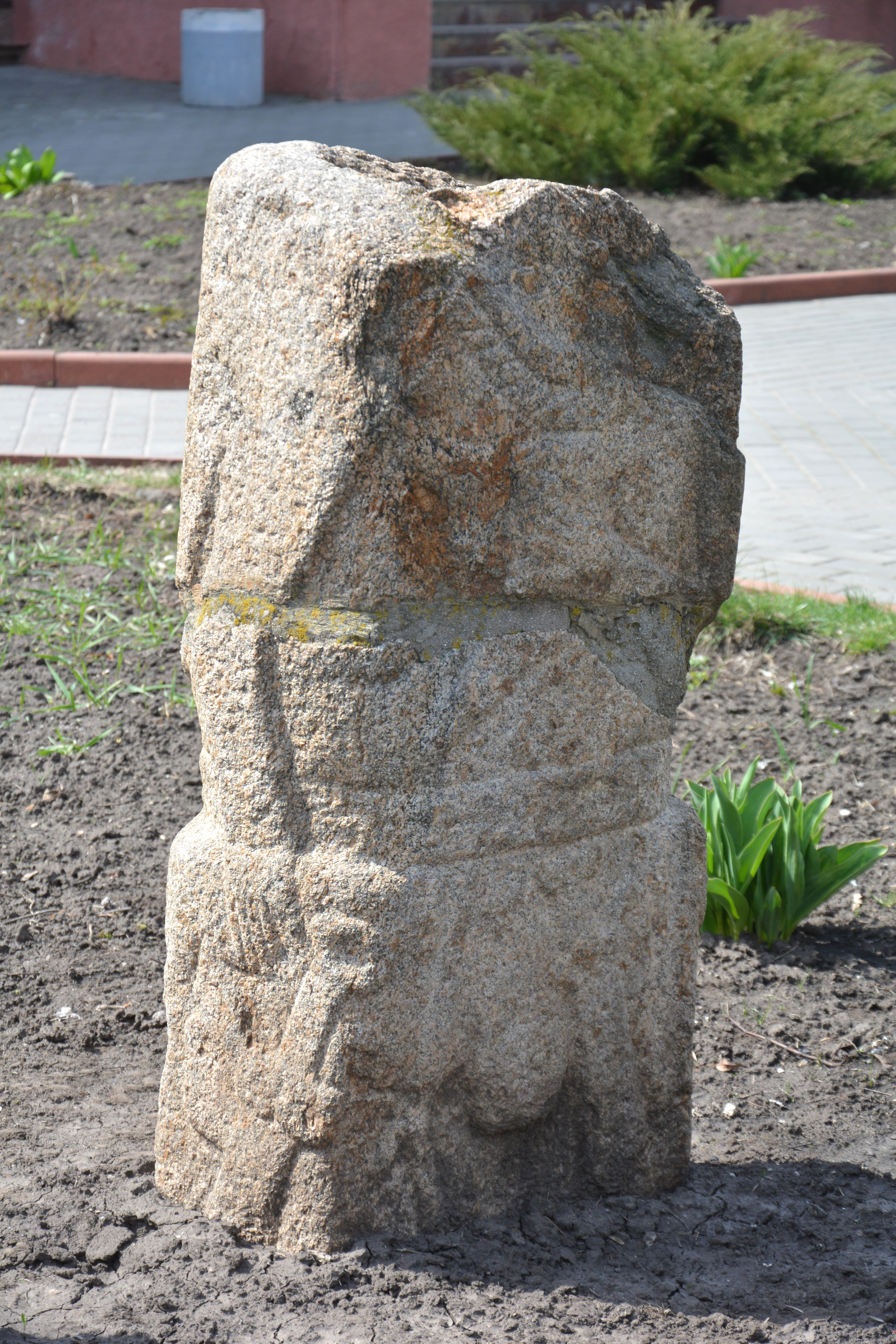
A stele from Melgunov Kurgan, now stored in Kropyvnytskyi Local History Museum

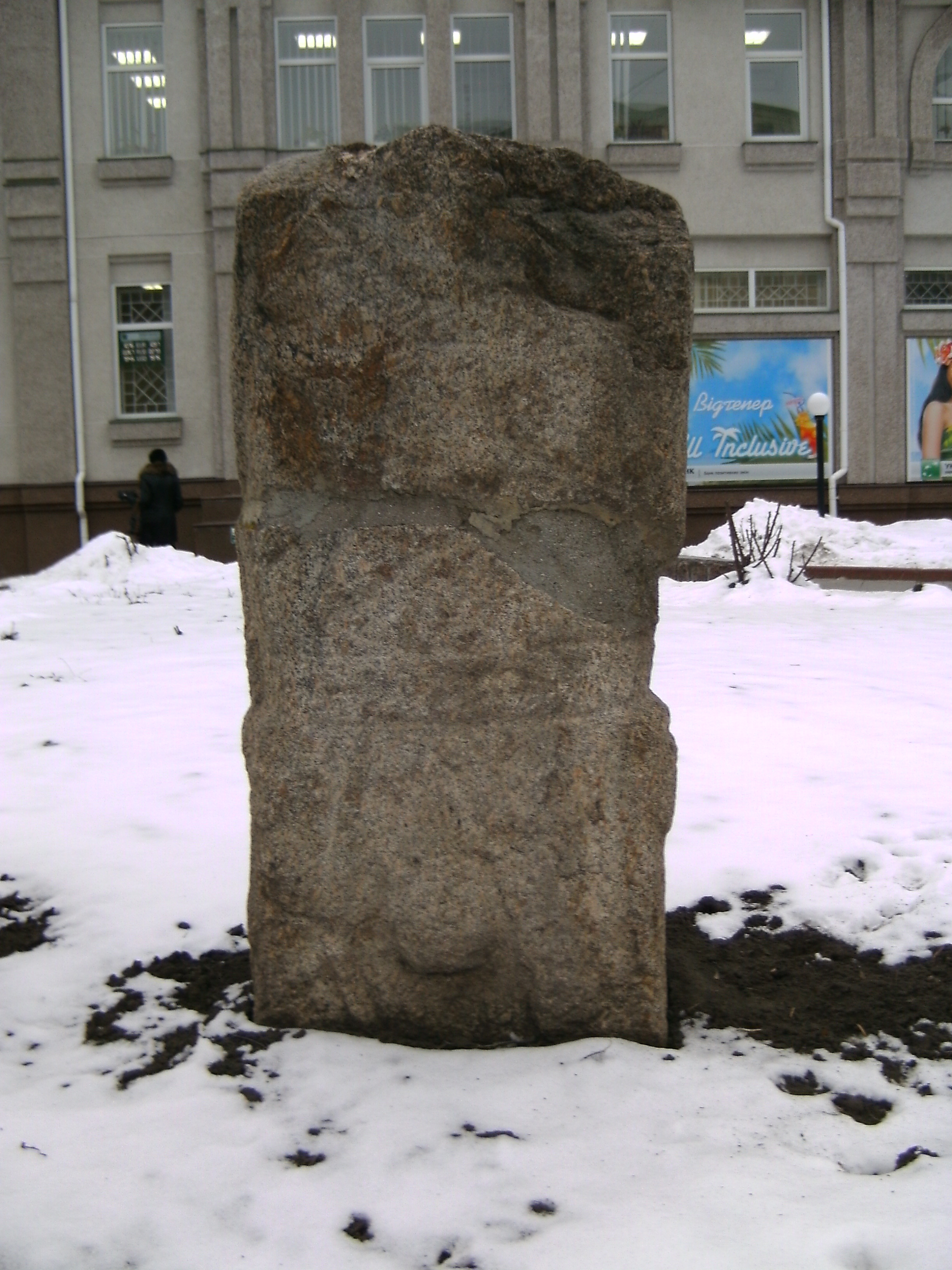
A stele found near Kropyvnytskyi that is believed to have originated from Melgunov Kurgan
