= Flag of Chernivtsi Oblast =

Flag of Chernivtsi Oblast. Ratio: 2:3

The flag of the Chernivtsi Oblast is the official flag of Chernivtsi Oblast, an oblast in Ukraine. It was officially adopted on December 12, 2001.

On the flag, there is a rectangular panel with a ratio of 2:3. From the top and bottom edges are blue-and-yellow stripes. The width of the blue strip equals 1/10 of a flag's total width, and the yellow stripes width equals 1/30 of the flag's width. At the center of the flag is a white falcon on a green background. The falcons height equals 1/2 of the height of the flag.

The white falcon is a symbol of beauty and bravery. The green background color stands for well-being and hope. The blue-and-yellow strips symbolize the Chernivtsi Oblast itself, the blue standing for rivers of region, and yellow for grain fields.
