= Flag of Kyiv Oblast =

- Use: Civil and state flag
- Proportion: 2:3
- Adopted: 2 February 1999
- Design: Blue, yellow
- Designed by: Vasyl Bosenko

The flag of Kyiv Oblast serves as the official symbol of the region, was approved on 2 February 1999. It was designed by the artist Vasyl Bosenko.

== Description ==
The flag of Kyiv Oblast consists of a rectangular field with three vertical stripes of equal width. The central stripe is yellow, while the outer stripes are blue. The width-to-length ratio of the flag is 2:3 (h).

The central stripe displays an image of Saint George (Yurii/Heorhii) and a dragon, rendered in proportions consistent with the oblast's coat of arms. The distance from the top edge of the stripe to the halo around the rider's head, as well as from the bottom edge to the dragon, measures 0.5 (h). The distance from the left edge of the central stripe to the cloak is 0.09 (h).

== See also ==
- Kyiv Oblast
