= Flag of Poltava Oblast =

Ukrainian oblastal flag

Poltava Oblast
- Use: Other
- Proportion: 2:3
- Adopted: 10 February 2000
- Design: a yellow Cossack cross on a blue background
- Designed by: E. Shyrai

The flag of the Poltava Oblast is the official flag of Poltava Oblast, an oblast in Ukraine. It was designed by E. Shyrai, and officially adopted by the solution of the tenth session of the Poltava Oblast rada on February 10, 2000.

The flag consists of a yellow Cossack cross on a blue background, with a ratio of 2:3.

Flag of Lubny Raion
