= Flag of Vinnytsia Oblast =

- Proportion: 2:3
- Adopted: July 18, 1997

The flag of Vinnytsia Oblast is a flag which, together with the coat of arms, is the official symbol of the Vinnytsia Oblast, Ukraine. It was approved on July 18, 1997.

== Description ==
The flag of the region is a blue rectangular banner with an aspect ratio of 2:3. In the center of the flag are the coats of arms of Podolia, the golden sun, and the Bracław region (Eastern Podolia), a silver cross with a blue shield with a silver crescent. Two red stripes are placed horizontally in the upper and lower parts at a distance of 1/10 from the edge of the canvas and 1/10 of the width. The combination of two equal red and blue stripes symbolizes the unity of the lands of Podolia and Bracław, and their repetition is in line with the heraldic decision to build the region's coat of arms. In addition, the two blue stripes on the edges of the flag symbolize the two deepest rivers of the region: the Dniester and the Southern Bug.

Coat of Arms of Vinnytsia Oblast

Banner of the Duchy of Podolia c. 1410

Coat of Arms of Bracław Voivodeship

== See also ==
- List of flags of Ukraine
