= Coat of arms of Kharkiv =

Heraldic design of Ukrainian oblast and city

Versions
- Coat of arms of Kharkiv Oblast
- Armiger: Kharkiv
- Adopted: 14 September 1995

The Coat of arms of Kharkiv is the official coat of arms of both Kharkiv city and Kharkiv Oblast.

It is also a historical flag of Sloboda Ukraine.

== History ==
The oldest arms of the city, known from the early 17th century, showed a bow and arrow. These arms, of unknown meaning or origin, were used until 1781. On 21 September 1781, the city was granted new arms, showing a horn of plenty (cornucopia) and a staff of Mercury (caduceus), symbols for agriculture and trade.

On 5 July 1878 the arms were replaced. The new arms showed a horse-head, symbol for the famous stud farms in the city, with in the chief two coins and a star (see above). The coins symbolised trade and wealth, the star the new university. These arms were, at the request of the nobility, replaced by the old 1781 arms again on 21 May 1887.

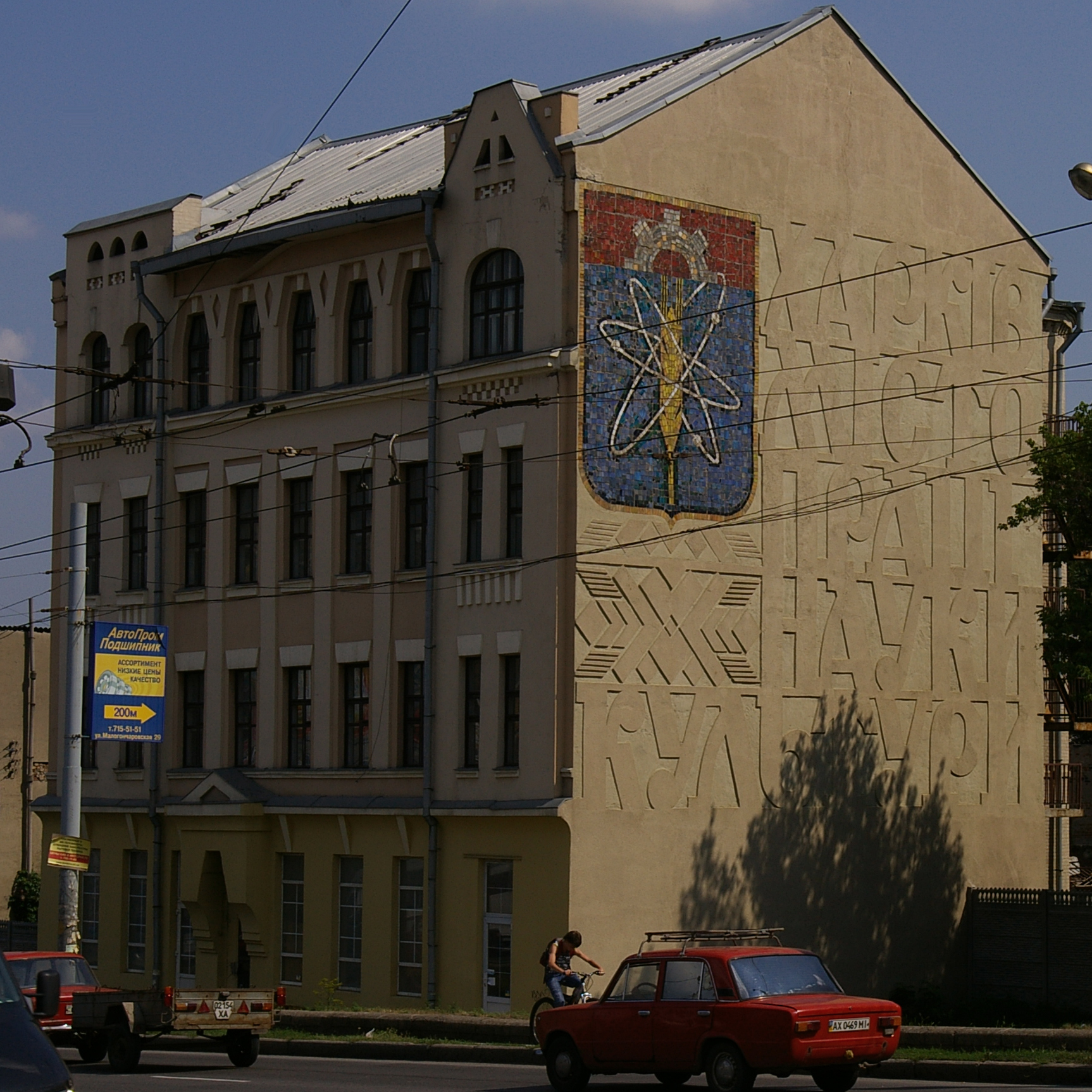
A mosaic with the Soviet coat of arms of the city.

The arms with the staff and cornucopia remained in use until 1918. During Soviet times the city had no official arms until 26 December 1968. The new arms were a typical example of Soviet heraldry, showing a wheel for industry, an atom for center of nuclear research and a wheat-ear for agriculture, as well as the name of the city.

Finally, on 14 September 1995, the city council adopted the arms from 1878 again as the new city arms.

The first Kharkiv coat of arms

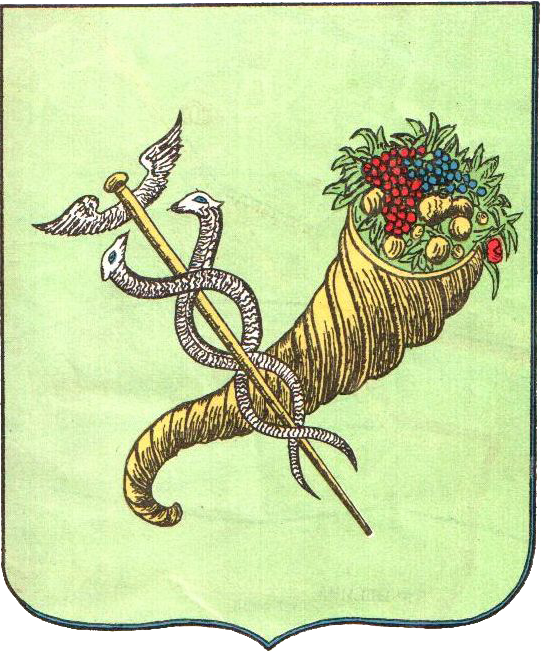
Coat of Arms of Kharkov 1781

The first coat of arms of the Kharkov Governorate

The coat of arms of Kharkov Governorate

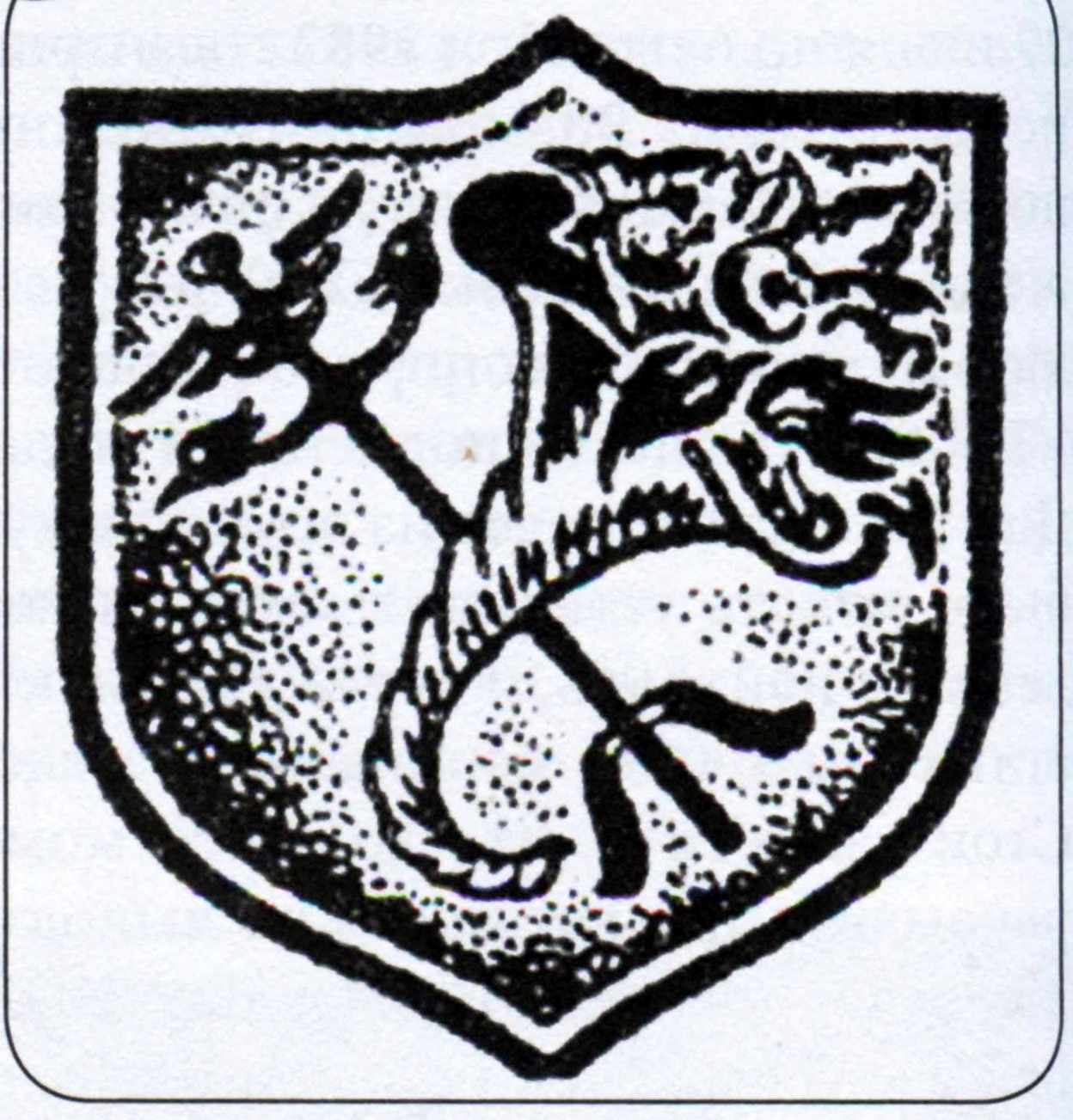
Coat of arms of the Kharkov during the German occupation 1941–1943

The Soviet coat of arms of Kharkov (1968–1995)

== Description ==
The coat of arms consists of a verdant shield with gold trim. A caduceus and a cornucopia are crossed on it. The caduceus symbolises commerce, while the cornucopia, also called the "horn of plenty", emphasises an abundance of food. The shield is wreathed with golden oak leaves tied with a blue ribbon. The upper half of a sprocket is visible above the shield, symbolising industry. Four stalks of rye, two on either side of the sprocket, symbolise agriculture. The sprocket is surmounted by an open book with an atomic symbol, symbolising education and science.

The city of Ragusa, Sicily has similar heraldic combination (caduceus and cornucopia).
