= Flag of Cherkasy Oblast =

Flag of Cherkasy Region, Ukraine

Flag of Cherkasy Oblast. Ratio: 2:3

The flag of Cherkasy Oblast is the official flag of Cherkasy Oblast, an oblast in Ukraine. It was designed by Oleksandra and Mykola Telizhenko, and officially adopted by the resolution of a regional council No. 15-3 on January 29, 1998.

The flag is a rectangular panel, with a ratio of width to its length, 2:3. The larger half of it has a dark blue color, which one symbolizes a celestial altitude and advantage. The center of the flag features the oblast's coat of arms and the Ukrainian letters: Черкаська область. The top, right, and bottom edges of the flag have a yellow border.
