= Flag of Chernihiv Oblast =

Flag of Chernihiv region in Ukraine

Flag of Chernihiv Oblast. Ratio: 2:3

The flag of the Chernihiv Oblast is the official flag of Chernihiv Oblast, an oblast in Ukraine. It was designed by I. Sytyi, A. Hrechylo and I. Pavlenko, and officially adopted by the resolution of a regional council on July 11, 2000.

The flag is a rectangular green panel with an aspect ratio of 2:3, the middle of which is a white horizontal stripe (width 1/5 of the flag's width), and in the upper pole of the white square shows the emblem area. Green stripes on the flag represent the Polissia and white line — the Desna River.

Emblem of the field — in a silver box black double-headed eagle with red claws and tongue, golden eyes and arms (beaks and claws) on their heads — open gold crown, in each chest there is blue shield with a gold edge — the golden mark of Prince Mstislav Volodimirovich, founder of the Grand Duchy of Chernigov.
