= Flag of Zhytomyr Oblast =

- Use: Civil and state flag
- Proportion: 2:3
- Adopted: 31 October 2002
- Design: Red, yellow

The flag of Zhytomyr Oblast, alongside the coat of arms, forms the official insignia of the oblast's local self-government and executive authorities. The flag was officially adopted on 31 October 2002 by a resolution of the eighth session of the Zhytomyr Oblast Council of the 24th convocation.

== Description ==
The flag features a rectangular red field with a width-to-length ratio of 2:3. At its center is the coat of arms of the city of Zhytomyr, positioned atop a straight yellow cross. The coat of arms measures 2:5 of the flag's height and 2:9 of its width. Each arm of the cross has a width equal to 1:18 of the flag's total width.

== Read also ==
- Zhytomyr Oblast
