= Flag of Mykolaiv Oblast =

Ukrainian oblast flag

- Use: Civil and state flag
- Proportion: 2:3

The flag of Mykolaiv Oblast serves as the region's official heraldic symbol, reflecting its history and traditions. It was approved by the regional council on 16 April 2026, with its author unknown. The previous flag was approved on 27 July 2001 and was designed by Ivan Bulavytskyi.

== Description ==
The flag is rectangular with an aspect ratio of 2:3, and it features three horizontal stripes: white, yellow, and blue, with proportions of 2:1:1. Notably, the lower blue stripe is wavy. At the center of the flag is the coat of arms displaying Saint Nicholas. Additionally, the reverse side of the flag is a mirror image of the obverse.

The pre-2026 flag

The previous flag featured a golden episcopal mitre positioned on crossed golden staffs.

== See also ==
- Mykolaiv Oblast
