= Flag of Luhansk Oblast =

Ukrainian oblast flag

Luhansk Oblast
- Use: Civil and state flag
- Proportion: 2:3
- Adopted: 4 September 1998
- Design: A blue field charged in the upper hoist with Luhansk Oblast's coat of arms encircled by seventeen gold and fourteen white five-pointed stars
- Designed by: Leonid Zhdanov

The flag of Luhansk Oblast (Ukrainian: Прапор Луганської області) is an official symbol of Luhansk Oblast, an oblast (region) of Ukraine. It is a blue field charged in the upper hoist with Luhansk Oblast's coat of arms encircled by seventeen gold and fourteen white five-pointed stars. It was adopted on 4 September 1998 with the passing of Resolution No. 3/19 by the Luhansk Oblast Council.

== Design and symbolism ==
The flag of Luhansk Oblast features the oblast's coat of arms (without the wreath) encircled by seventeen gold and fourteen white five-pointed stars on a blue field. The gold and white stars represent the oblast's seventeen raions (districts) and fourteen cities of regional significance, respectively. The dimensions of a standard-sized flag is 110 cm by 165 cm, a width-to-length ratio of 2 to 3. The radius of the circle of stars is 20 cm, with its center 49 cm from the left edge (hoist) and 39 cm from the top edge.

The Luhansk Oblast Council adopted the flag as an official symbol of the oblast with the passing of Resolution No. 3/19 on 4 September 1998. Although Leonid Zhdanov designed the flag chosen by the council, the coat of arms is credited to an A. Zakoretsky.

=== Coat of arms ===
Coat of arms of Luhansk Oblast
- Adopted: 15 May 1998
- Shield: a forge and hammers, a golden sun, a golden horse, a golden marmot
- Motto: Luhansk Oblast (Луганська область)
- Designer: A. Zakoretsky

The coat of arms of Luhansk Oblast was adopted on 15 May 1998 and features a shield within a shield, and a total of four charges: a forge with hammers, a golden rising sun, a golden horse, and a golden marmot. The forge and sun symbolise Luhansk Oblast's mining industry and position in the east of Ukraine, respectively, while the horse and marmot are from the region's historical coat of arms. It was designed by A. Zakoretsky.
