= Flag of Zakarpattia Oblast =

Zakarpattia Oblast
- Use: Other
- Proportion: 3:2
- Adopted: 27 February 2009
- Design: A blue and yellow bicolor of equal stripes, charged with the coat of arms of Carpathian Ruthenia in the canton.
- Designed by: V. Shelepets

The flag of Zakarpattia Oblast is the official flag of Zakarpattia Oblast, an oblast in Ukraine. The flag was officially adopted on 27 February 2009.

== History ==
The region of Transcarpathia has had various symbols throughout history. Alongside the national flag of Ukraine, the region has had symbols of different cultures in the region, most prominently the Rusyns.

Flag of Ukraine, used by the Czechoslovak region of Carpatho-Ukraine.

Flag of Ukraine (1917-1921), used by the Hutsul Republic in the eastern half of the region.

Flag of Rusyns, a prominent ethnic group in the region.

=== 1990 proposals ===
In 1990, 3 flags were proposed to the Oblast Council. This was before Ukraine declared independence.

First proposal. Note the proposal's nearly identical design to the Flag of Ukraine. This flag was proposed before the flag of Ukraine was adopted by the Ukrainian Soviet Socialist Republic.

Second proposal.

Third proposal.

=== 2007 proposals ===
A contest to adopt a flag for the Oblast was announced on September 12th, 2006, to adopt a new flag. Sometime in 2007, the following proposals were considered:

First proposal

Second proposal

Third submission, Flag proposed by A. Filippov

Fourth proposal, eventually the one adopted. Proposed by V. Shelepets

Fifth submission, proposed by the "People's Council of Rusyns"

Sixth proposal

Seventh proposal

Eighth proposal

Ninth submission, Flag proposed by A. B. Grechilo

Eleventh proposal
