= Flag of Odesa Oblast =

Ukrainian oblast flag

- Use: Civil and state flag
- Proportion: 2:3
- Adopted: 21 February 2002
- Design: Yellow, blue, white

The flag of Odesa Oblast serves as the official symbol of the region and was approved on 21 February 2002 by a resolution of the Odesa Oblast Council.

== Design ==
The flag consists of a rectangular panel with a width-to-length ratio of 2:3, featuring three equal vertical stripes in yellow, blue, and white. The coat of arms of Odesa Oblast, without the wreath, is positioned at the center of the blue stripe.

The silver anchor is derived from the historic coat of arms of the city of Odesa. The seven anchors represent the seven ports within Odesa Oblast. The wheat ears signify agriculture, and the grape cluster denotes viticulture and winemaking.
