= Flag of Rivne Oblast =

- Proportion: 2:3
- Adopted: 9 August 2005
- Design: blue, yellow, white

The flag of Rivne Oblast is a symbol that reflects the history and traditions of the region. Together with the coat of arms, it forms the official insignia of the local government and executive authorities of Rivne Oblast. It was adopted on 9 August 2005 by the regional council.

It consists of a rectangular panel with a width-to-length ratio of 2:3, comprising five horizontal stripes—white, yellow, light blue, yellow and white (the ratio of their widths is 3:2:2:2:3); in the centre of the flag is the region's coat of arms, framed by a yellow cartouche. White is the colour of the flag, whilst blue and yellow are the colours of the national flag.

== Sources ==
- "Рівненська область". Ukrainian heraldry (in Ukrainian).
- "Рівненська область". Ukrainian Heraldry Society (in Ukrainian).
- Hrechylo A. Modern Symbols of the Regions of Ukraine. — Kyiv, Lviv, 2008. — p. 33–35.
