= Flag of Ivano-Frankivsk Oblast =

Flag representing Ivano-Frankvisk Oblast in Ukraine

Ivano-Frankivsk Oblast
- Proportion: 2:3
- Adopted: 2001; 25 years ago
- Design: White field with a black jackdaw. Both the vertical edges are decorated by two different narrow bicolors.
- Designed by: Andriy Grechylo (Андрій Ґречило)

The flag of Ivano-Frankivsk Oblast (Ukrainian: Прапор Івано-Франківської області; translit.: Prapor Ivano-Frankivs'koi oblasti) is the official flag of Ivano-Frankivsk Oblast, an oblast in Ukraine. It is a symbol of the Ivano-Frankivsk Oblast that inherits a historical tradition of using regional symbols and is an attribute of the local government and executive powers.

The flag represents a banner of 2:3 proportion. In the middle of a white field is depicted a black jackdaw with raised wings and golden (yellow) crown, while facing the flagpole. At the flagpole side and along the side stretch red and black stripes, while on the opposite side the same way stretch blue and yellow stripes. The width of each stripe consists of 1/12 of the flag's length. The jackdaw with a crown represents the city of Halych, the traditional center of Galicia (Halych Land). The stripes represent the tradition of a fight for independence. The red and black stripes are the UPA colors, while the blue and yellow are the colors of national colors.

== See also ==
- List of Ukrainian flags
