= Flag of Ternopil Oblast =

- Proportion: 2:3
- Adopted: 18 November 2003

The flag of Ternopil Oblast (Ukrainian: Прапор Тернопільської області) is an official symbol of Ternopil Oblast, an oblast (region) of Ukraine. It follows the historical tradition of using regional symbols, an attribute of local governments and the executive branch.

The flag has a rectangular blue banner with an aspect ratio of 2:3, a yellow sword and a key placed in the middle, and three white towers with yellow accents above them.

== History ==
In December 2001, a rectangular banner with an aspect ratio of 2:3 was approved, which consisted of two horizontal stripes, yellow and blue, in the ratio of 1:2. On the yellow strip there are three white towers with open gates. In the blue strip there is a yellow vertical sword with the hilt up and a horizontal yellow key.

After the remarks of the Ukrainian Heraldic Society regarding the coat of arms, the new decision on November 18, 2003 changed the flag of the region.

== See also ==
- Coat of arms of Ternopil Oblast
- Ternopil Oblast

== Sources ==
- Рішення Тернопільської обласної ради від 21 грудня 2001 року №317 Про герб і прапор Тернопільської області
- Рішення Тернопільської обласної ради від 18 листопада 2003 року №203 Про внесення часткових змін до герба і прапора Тернопільської області
- Рішення Тернопільської обласної ради від 15 березня 2014 року №1595 Про затвердження Положення і національно-визвольної символіки

== Literature ==
- Гречило, А. Сучасні символи областей України. — Київ, Львів, 2008. — С. 36-37.
