= Flag of Khmelnytskyi Oblast =

Ukrainian oblast flag

- Proportion: 2:3
- Adopted: 21 March 2002
- Design: Solid blue, red, yellow
- Designed by: M. Mastykash

The flag of Khmelnytskyi Oblast, alongside the coat of arms, constitutes the official insignia of the local self-government and executive authorities of the oblast. On 21 March 2002, the regional council, during its twenty-second session, unanimously approved both the coat of arms and the flag of Khmelnytskyi Oblast.

== Description ==
The flag features a rectangular panel divided into two equal vertical stripes: blue at the hoist and red at the fly. The center displays the oblast's coat of arms, which consists of a heraldic shield split into blue and red halves. Positioned over the dividing line are a golden sun and two wheat ears.

The sun represents the traditional symbol of Podillia, while the red color originates from the historical coat of arms of Volhynia. The wheat ears symbolize the region's agrarian character and are arranged to form the letter "Х", the initial of the oblast's name.
