= Coat of arms and flag of Sumy Oblast =

Ukrainian oblast symbols

Coat of arms of Sumy Oblast
- Adopted: 12 July 2000
- Shield: Golden helmet, golden ear of wheat, golden cross
- Other elements: Golden border
- Designer: Y. M. Shelkovnikov

Sumy Oblast
- Use: Civil and state flag
- Proportion: 2:3
- Adopted: 12 July 2000
- Design: A light blue field charged in the center with the coat of arms of Sumy Oblast
- Designed by: Y. M. Shelkovnikov

The coat of arms and flag of Sumy Oblast are official symbols of Sumy Oblast, an oblast (region) of Ukraine. They were both adopted on 12 July 2000 by the decision of the Sumy Oblast Council. Y. M. Shelkovnikov is credited as the designer of both symbols.

The coat of arms is a golden-bordered, light blue escutcheon (shield) charged with a golden helmet, a golden ear of wheat, and a golden cross (the cross of Okhtyrka). As Sumy Oblast was formed from territory taken from three other oblasts, the three charges represent those constituent parts. The helmet represents Chernihiv Oblast, the ear of wheat represents Kharkiv Oblast, and the cross represents Poltava Oblast. The helmet also pays homage to the Kievan Rus'. The ear of wheat is shaped like the Cyrillic letter "С", the first letter of the oblast's Ukrainian name, and has 25 grains representing the oblast's initial 25 raions (districts). The cross symbolises the people's commitment to Eastern Orthodoxy.

The flag of Sumy Oblast is a light blue field (the same shade as the coat of arm's escutcheon) with the coat of arms charged in the center. The width-to-length ratio of the flag is 2:3, and the ratio of the coat of arms' height to the flag's width (or height) is also 2:3.
