= Flag of Kirovohrad Oblast =

Oblast flag

Flag of Kirovohrad Oblast. Ratio: 2:3

The Flag of Kirovohrad Oblast is the official flag of Kirovohrad Oblast, an oblast in Ukraine. It was adopted on 29 July 1998. The authors of the flag are Vitaliy Kryvenko and Kostiantyn Shliakhovyi.

The flag is rectangular with the ratio of 2:3. It is divided into two vertical stripes: raspberry on the left and yellow on the right. On the raspberry stripe is the coat of arms: an image of a yellow steppe eagle, which is based on a golden statuette found in the Scythian Melgunov Kurgan. The yellow color symbolizes wealthiness, while the raspberry color symbolizes dignity, strength, and Cossack heritage.
