= Flag of Kherson Oblast =

Ukrainian oblast flag

Kherson Oblast
- Use: Civil and state flag
- Proportion: 2:3
- Adopted: 25 October 2001
- Design: A horizontal triband with blue outer bands and a wide white central band charged near the hoist with Kherson Oblast's coat of arms
- Designed by: Serhii H. Sazonov and Yurii P. Shchepeliev

The flag of Kherson Oblast (Ukrainian: Прапор Херсонської області, romanized: Prapor Khersonsʹkoyi oblasti) is an official symbol of Kherson Oblast, an oblast (region) of Ukraine. It is a horizontal triband with blue outer bands and a wide white central band charged near the hoist with the oblast's coat of arms. It was adopted on 25 October 2001 with the passing of Resolution No. 440 by the Kherson Oblast Council.

== Design and symbolism ==
The flag is a horizontal triband consisting of blue outer bands and a wide white central band charged near the hoist with Kherson Oblast's coat of arms. The blue represents the "grandeur" of the waterbodies within the oblast, while the white symbolises purity and sincerity. The flag's width-to-length ratio is 2 to 3.

=== Coat of arms ===
Coat of arms of Kherson Oblast

The coat of arms of Kherson Oblast is a cartouche shaped like a baroque shield with rounded lower corners. The cartouche has a blue background and features a number of symbols in gold, including an anchor (representing hope and the oblast's ports and waterways), a compass (representing a clear plan for construction and economic revival), two ears of grain (representing agriculture, the main economic activity in the oblast), and the Ochakiv Gate (the entrance to the Kherson fortress). It is topped by a crown and framed by an oak wreath with a ribbon at the bottom that reads "Kherson Oblast" in Ukrainian.

== History ==
The Kherson Oblast Council formed a special commission in the fall of 2001 to design a flag and coat of arms for the oblast. Several designs were considered, and ultimately one created jointly by Serhii H. Sazonov, an architect and senior lecturer at Kherson National Technical University, and Yurii P. Shchepeliev, head of Kherson Oblast's branch of the Union of Designers of Ukraine, was chosen. The Kherson Oblast Council passed Resolution No. 440 on 25 October 2001, formally adopting the flag and coat of arms as official symbols of the oblast.

In 2020, the Ukrainian Heraldry Society (UHT) proposed a new flag incorporating Kherson's heraldic symbols from the time of the Ukrainian People's Republic (UNR; 1917–1921). Kherson historian and UHT member Oleksii Patalakh argued that a change was overdue because Kherson Oblast's flag is the only oblast flag that does not feature UNR-era symbolism, and because the existing coat of arms broke heraldic norms.

Other proposals for the flag of Kherson Oblast
2001 proposal no. 1

2001 proposal no. 2

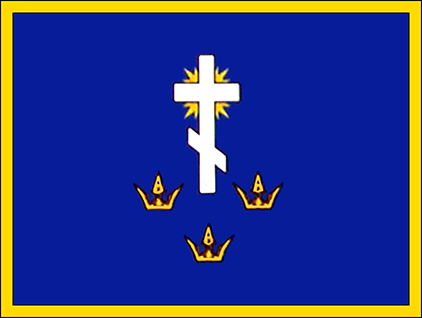
2020 proposal by the Ukrainian Heraldic Association
