= Flag of Lviv Oblast =

Flag of Ukrainian region

Lviv Oblast
- Proportion: 2:3
- Adopted: February 27, 2001

The flag of Lviv Oblast (Ukrainian: прапор Львівської області; prapor L'vivs'koji oblasti) is one of regional flags of Ukraine. It is a symbol of Lviv Oblast that inherits a historical tradition of using regional symbols and is an attribute of the local government and executive powers.

It was officially approved on February 27, 2001, by the decision of the Lviv Oblast Council.

The flag's proportion is 2:3. It features the region's emblem (crowned yellow or golden lion) in the center. The height of the lion is 3/4 of the flag's width and the distance from the upper and lower edges of the cloth is 1/8 the width of the flag. Its flip side is the mirror image.

The reference sample flag field is kept in the office of Chairman of the Regional Council.

== Meaning ==
The lion leaning on a rock symbolizes the power and strength of the land and its inhabitants, who defended their independence from strangers for centuries. At the same time, it resonates with the name of the city of Lviv and the name of its first ruler Leo I of Galicia.

The crown on the lion's head indicates the capital role of Kingdom of Rus' (Kingdom of Galicia–Volhynia) in the 12th–14th centuries and Kingdom of Galicia and Lodomeria in the 18th–20th centuries.

== Other flags ==
Flag of the historic Ruthenian Voivodeship, also centred in Lviv

== See also ==
- List of flags of Ukraine
- Ruthenian lion
