= Flag of Kyiv =

Flag of the city of Kyiv

Kyiv
- Use: Civil and state flag
- Proportion: 2∶3
- Adopted: 25 May 1995
- Design: An azure field with a gold-yellow border with Archangel Michael centered on the flag

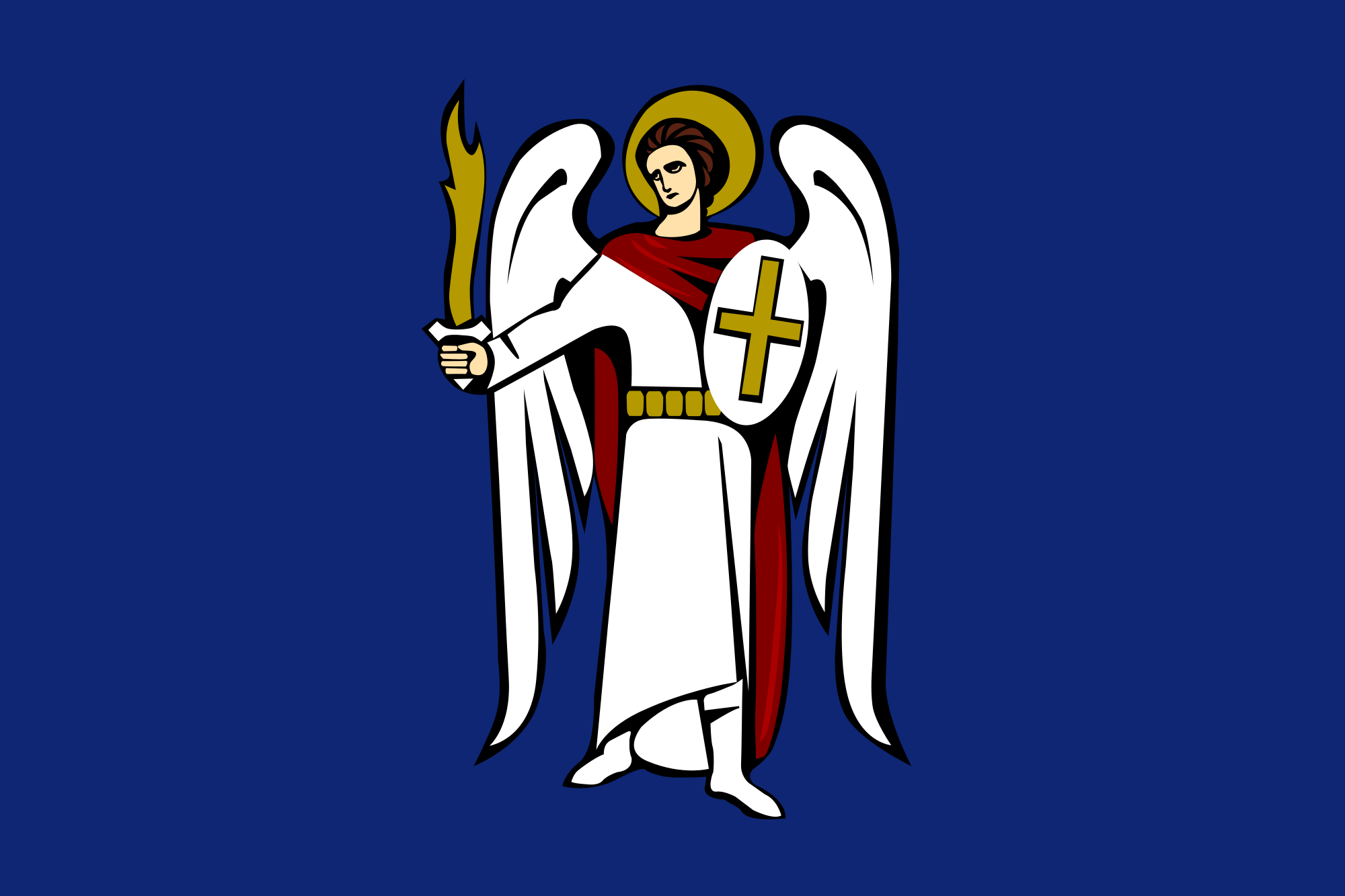
The Kyiv flag variant with the image of the Archangel of Y. Solominsky

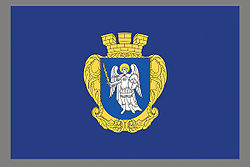
O. Rudenko's design of flag with the Coat of Arms in the center

The flag of Kyiv was approved by the Kyiv City Council on 25 May 1995, at the behest of the then head of the Kyiv City Council of People's Deputies Leonid Kosakovsky.

On 27 May 1995, the flag was first raised solemnly above the main entrance to the Kyiv City Council.

The flag of Kyiv looks like an azure piece of fabric with the Kyiv Coat of Arms situated in the centre. The patron saint of Kyiv, Archangel Michael who holds a flaming sword in his right hand and an oval shield with a cross on it in his left, is depicted on the flag. The flag panel has a gold-yellow border.

== History ==
In 1995 a resolution of the Kyiv City Council (36 deputies voted for) returned the coat of arms of Kyiv of the times of Russian Empire—stylised representation of Archangel Michael, and adopted the flag of the city.

The design firms in charge of the new flag first produced designs with the image of the Archangel in G. Kurovsky's variant, and later, for unknown reasons, in the variant of Y. Solominsky.

In March 2009, a working group at the Kyiv City Council drafted a new look for the capital's flag. The coat of arms of Kyiv is placed in its center. However, this design has not received further approval.

=== Description of the flag design ===
The Flag., "The flag of the capital of Ukraine – the hero city of Kyiv is a blue rectangular panel with a 2: 3 aspect ratio with the Coat of Arms of the city placed in the centre. The height of the Coat of Arms is 2: 3 the width of the panel. Both sides of the panel are identical."

== Colour standardisation ==
Colour model	Blue	Yellow	White	Magenta
RGB	rgb(0,91,187)	rgb(212,175,55)	rgb(255,255,255)	rgb(242,1,108)
CMYK	100, 51, 0, 27	0, 17, 74, 17	0, 0, 0, 0	0, 100, 55, 5
HEX	#005bbb	#d4af37	#FFFFFF	#f2016c
Websafe	#0066cc	#cc9933	#FFFFFF	#ff0066

Colour model	Dark Blue	Yellow	Brown	White	Red	Beige
RGB	rgb(14,38,116)	rgb(180,153,0)	rgb(89,34,19)	rgb(255,255,255)	rgb(128,0,0)	rgb(255,225,171)
CMYK	88, 67, 0, 55	0, 15, 100, 29	0, 62, 79, 65	0, 0, 0, 0	0, 100, 100, 50	0, 12, 33, 0
HEX	#0e2674	#b49900	#592213	#FFFFFF	#800000	#ffe1ab
Websafe	#003366	#cc9900	#663300	#FFFFFF	#990000	#ffcc99

== See also ==
- Coat of arms of Kyiv
