= Civil ensign =

Maritime flag used by civilian vessels to denote their nationality

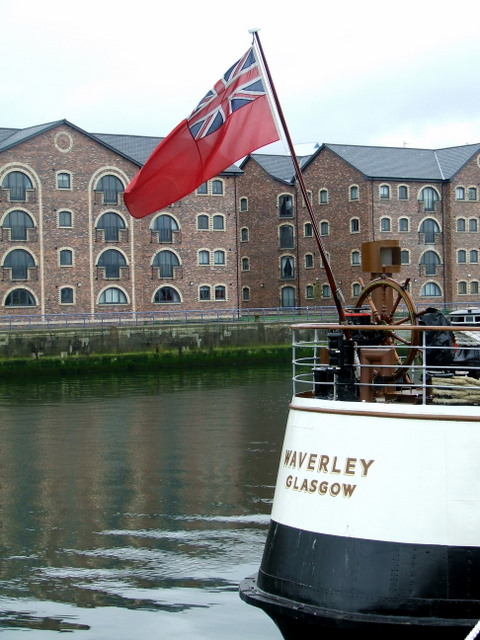
The British Red Ensign and its derivatives are famous examples of distinctive civil ensigns that are greatly different from the standard national flags.

A civil ensign is an ensign (maritime flag) used by civilian vessels to denote their nationality. It can be the same or different from the state ensign and the naval ensign (or war ensign). It is also known as the merchant ensign or merchant flag. Some countries have special civil ensigns for yachts, and even for specific yacht clubs, known as yacht ensigns.

Most countries have only one national flag and ensign for all purposes. In other countries, a distinction is made between the land flag and the civil, state and naval ensigns. The British ensigns, for example, differ from the flag used on land (the Union Flag) and have different versions of plain and defaced Red and Blue ensigns for civilian and state use, as well as the naval ensign (White Ensign) that can also be used by yachts of the Royal Yacht Squadron.

== Countries having specific civil ensigns ==
The civil ensigns that are different from the general national flag can be grouped into a number of categories.

=== Civil ensigns with the national flag in the canton ===
Several countries use red flags with, in most cases, either the respective national flag or the Union Flag in the canton, patterned after the Red Ensign. British overseas territories fly the plain Red Ensign or a Red Ensign with the respective colonial arms in the fly. Saudi Arabia puts its national flag in the canton of an otherwise-green flag (the Saudi Arabian flag is hoisted with the flagpole to its right so the canton is in the upper right corner of the flag). Ghana stopped using its Red Ensign in 2003 with the adoption of a new merchant shipping act, which made the Ghanaian flag the proper national colors for Ghanaian ships. Similarly, Sri Lanka stopped using its Red Ensign in 1969 and uses the Sri Lankan flag as the civil ensign. Under the relevant shipping law for the Solomon Islands, the Shipping Act 1998, (No. 5 of 1998), the national flag of the Solomon Islands and not a Red Ensign is the appropriate flag: "The National Flag of Solomon Islands shall be the national colours for a vessel registered under this Act." Nevertheless, the Solomon Islands Red Ensign is still used in some cases.

==== Sovereign states ====
National flag
Civil ensign
Australia

National flag
Civil ensign
Bangladesh

National flag
Civil ensign
The Bahamas

National flag
Civil ensign
Fiji

National flag
Civil ensign
India

National flag
Jamaica

National flag
Civil ensign
Malaysia

National flag
Civil ensign
Mauritius

National flag
Civil ensign
New Zealand

National flag
Civil ensign
Nigeria

National flag
Civil ensign
Pakistan

National flag
Civil ensign
Saudi Arabia

National flag
Civil ensign
Solomon Islands

National flag
Sri Lanka

National flag
Civil ensign
United Arab Emirates

National flag
Civil ensign
United Kingdom

==== British overseas territories and crown dependencies ====
The Red Ensign Group is a collaboration of United Kingdom shipping registries including British Overseas Territories and Crown dependencies. A ship registered in any country within the Red Ensign group is entitled to fly the Red Ensign, or it can choose to fly the Red Ensign defaced with its home port national colors.

National flag
Civil ensign
British Virgin Islands

National flag
Civil ensign
Cayman Islands

National flag
Civil ensign
Falkland Islands

National flag
Civil ensign
Gibraltar

National flag
Civil ensign
Guernsey

National flag
Civil ensign
Isle of Man

National flag
civil ensign
Jersey

National flag
Civil ensign
Turks and Caicos Islands

==== Blue Ensign exceptions ====
In some cases, the Blue Ensign may be flown in lieu of the Red Ensign if a number of merchant vessels crew are former Royal Navy personnel or current Royal Navy Reservists, or commanded by an officer of the Royal Navy Reserve. India and Sri Lanka enact similar laws.

National flag
Government ensign
United Kingdom

National flag
Reserve ensign
India

National flag
Government ensign
Sri Lanka

=== Civil ensigns that vary greatly from the national flag ===
Several countries have civil ensigns that are very different from the national flag.

National flag
Civil ensign
Albania

National flag
Civil ensign
Israel

National flag
Civil ensign
Luxembourg

National flag
Civil ensign
Maine

National flag
Civil ensign
Malta

National flag
Civil ensign
Monaco

National flag
Civil ensign
The Philippines (inland only)

National flag
Civil ensign
Singapore

=== Civil ensigns consisting of the national flag with an additional emblem ===
Well-known examples are the Italian civil ensign showing the shield with the arms of the sea republics, and the Polish civil ensign with the arms of Poland. Most of these emblems were added to distinguish the ensign from similar flags of other countries (e.g. Colombia/Ecuador) or from other signal flags (e.g. Malta/ H signal flag).

National flag
Civil ensign
Colombia

National flag
Civil ensign
El Salvador

National flag
merchant marine ensign
Italy

National flag
Civil ensign
Morocco

National flag
Civil ensign
Poland

National flag
Yacht ensign (US Waters only)
United States (Yacht ensign; unofficial)

National flag
Yachting club ensign
Finland (Yacht ensign)

National flag
Yachting club ensign
Spain (Yacht ensign)

=== Civil ensigns that are simplified national flags with coat of arms removed ===
In several countries (such as Spain and much of Hispanic America, and some European countries), there are two main versions of the flag, a simpler one (usually a striped flag) and a more elaborate one with the national arms. The simpler one is used as a civil ensign (and in most cases also as a civil flag), whereas the version with the arms is mainly used by the government and the military. In El Salvador, the civil ensign also differs from the national flag in the proportions.

National flag
Civil ensign
Andorra

National flag
Civil ensign
Argentina

National flag
Civil ensign
Austria

National flag
Civil ensign
Baden-Württemberg

National flag
Civil ensign
Bolivia

National flag
Civil ensign
Bremen

National flag
Civil ensign
Costa Rica

National flag
Civil ensign
Dominican Republic

National flag
Civil ensign
Ecuador

National flag
Civil ensign
El Salvador

National flag
Civil ensign
Ethiopia

National flag
National flag
Finland

National flag
Civil ensign
Germany

National flag
Civil ensign
Guatemala

National flag
Civil ensign
Haiti

National flag
Civil ensign
Hesse

National flag
Civil ensign
Hungary

National flag
Civil ensign
Mecklenburg-Vorpommern

National flag
Civil ensign
North Rhine-Westphalia

National flag
Civil ensign
Peru

National flag
Civil ensign
Romania

National flag
Civil ensign
San Marino

National flag
Civil ensign
Saxony

Civil ensign
Schleswig-Holstein

National flag
Civil ensign
Serbia

National flag
Civil ensign
Spain

National flag
Civil ensign
Tajikistan

National flag
Civil ensign
Thuringia

National flag
Civil ensign
Transnistria

National flag
Civil ensign
Venezuela

=== Civil ensigns with a modified coat of arms ===
Some civil ensigns have had their coat of arms modified with an additional feature or features to distinguish them.

National flag
Civil ensign
Berlin

National flag
Civil ensign
Hamburg

=== Civil ensigns differing from the national flag in the proportions ===
Several former British colonies use 1:2 as a proportion for their ensigns and 3:5 for flags ashore, whereas Slovenia, Croatia and Hungary have it the other way around, with ensigns at 2:3 and flags ashore at 1:2. France is a special case: the overall proportion is the same, but the bands on the ensign differ in width slightly.

National flag
Civil ensign
Belgium

National flag
Civil ensign
Croatia

National flag
Civil ensign
Grenada

National flag
Civil ensign
Hungary

National flag
Civil ensign
Lower Saxony

National flag
Civil ensign
Slovenia

National flag
Civil ensign
Switzerland

National flag
Civil ensign
Trinidad and Tobago

=== Former civil ensigns no longer in current use or obsolete ===
National flag
Civil ensign
Albania
(1945–1992)

National flag
Civil ensign
Anconine Republic
(1797–1798)

National flag
Civil ensign
Anguilla
(1967–1969)

National flag
Civil ensign
Australia
(1901–1903)

National flag
Civil ensign
Australia
(1903–1908)

Flag of the Habsburg Monarchy
Civil ensign
Austria-Hungary
(1869–1918)

National flag
Civil ensign
The Bahamas
(1869–1904)

National flag
Civil ensign
The Bahamas
(1904–1923)

National flag
Civil ensign
The Bahamas
(1923–1953)

National flag
Civil ensign
The Bahamas
(1953–1964)

National flag
Civil ensign
The Bahamas
(1964–1973)

National flag
Civil ensign
Barbados
(1870–1966)

National flag
Civil ensign
British Guiana
(1906–1919)

National flag
Civil ensign
British Guiana
(1919–1955)

National flag
Civil ensign
British Guiana
(1955–1966)

National flag
Civil ensign
British Honduras
(1870–1919)

National flag
Civil ensign
British Honduras
(1919–1981)

National flag
Civil ensign
British Leeward Islands
(1871–1952)

National flag
Civil ensign
British Leeward Islands
(1952–1958)

National flag
Civil ensign
British Somaliland
(1903–1950)

National flag
Civil ensign
British Somaliland
(1950–1952)

National flag
Civil ensign
British Somaliland
(1952–1960)

National flag
Civil ensign
British Windward Islands
(1903–1953)

National flag
Civil ensign
British Windward Islands
(1953–1958)

National flag
Civil ensign
Burma
(1952–1974)

National flag
Civil ensign
Burma
(1974–2010)

National flag
Civil ensign
Canada
(1868–1922)

National flag
Canada
(1907–1922)
(Unofficial)

National flag
Civil Ensign
Canada
(1922–1957)

National flag
Civil Ensign
Canada
(1957–1965)

National flag
Civil ensign
Cayman Islands
(1988–1999)

National flag
Civil ensign
Ceylon
(1875–1948)

National flag
Civil ensign
Ceylon
(1955–1969)

National flag
Civil ensign
China / Taiwan (1929–1966)

National flag
Civil ensign
Croatia-Slavonia
(1868–1918)

National flag
Civil ensign
Croatia
(1939–1941)

National flag
Civil ensign
Croatia
(1941–1945)

National flag
Civil ensign
Cyprus
(1922–1960)

National flag
Civil ensign
Egypt
(1914–1922)

National flag
Civil ensign
England
(1674–1707)

National flag
Civil ensign
Ethiopia
(1975–1987)

National flag
Civil ensign
Ethiopia
(1991–1996)

National flag
Civil ensign
Etruria
(1803–1807)

National flag
Civil ensign
Etruria
(1803–1807)
(Smaller ships)

National flag
Civil ensign
Falkland Islands
(1999)

National flag
Civil ensign
Fiji
(1908–1970)

National flag
Civil ensign
Finland
(1918–1920)

National flag
Civil ensign
Florence
(1251–1569)

National flag
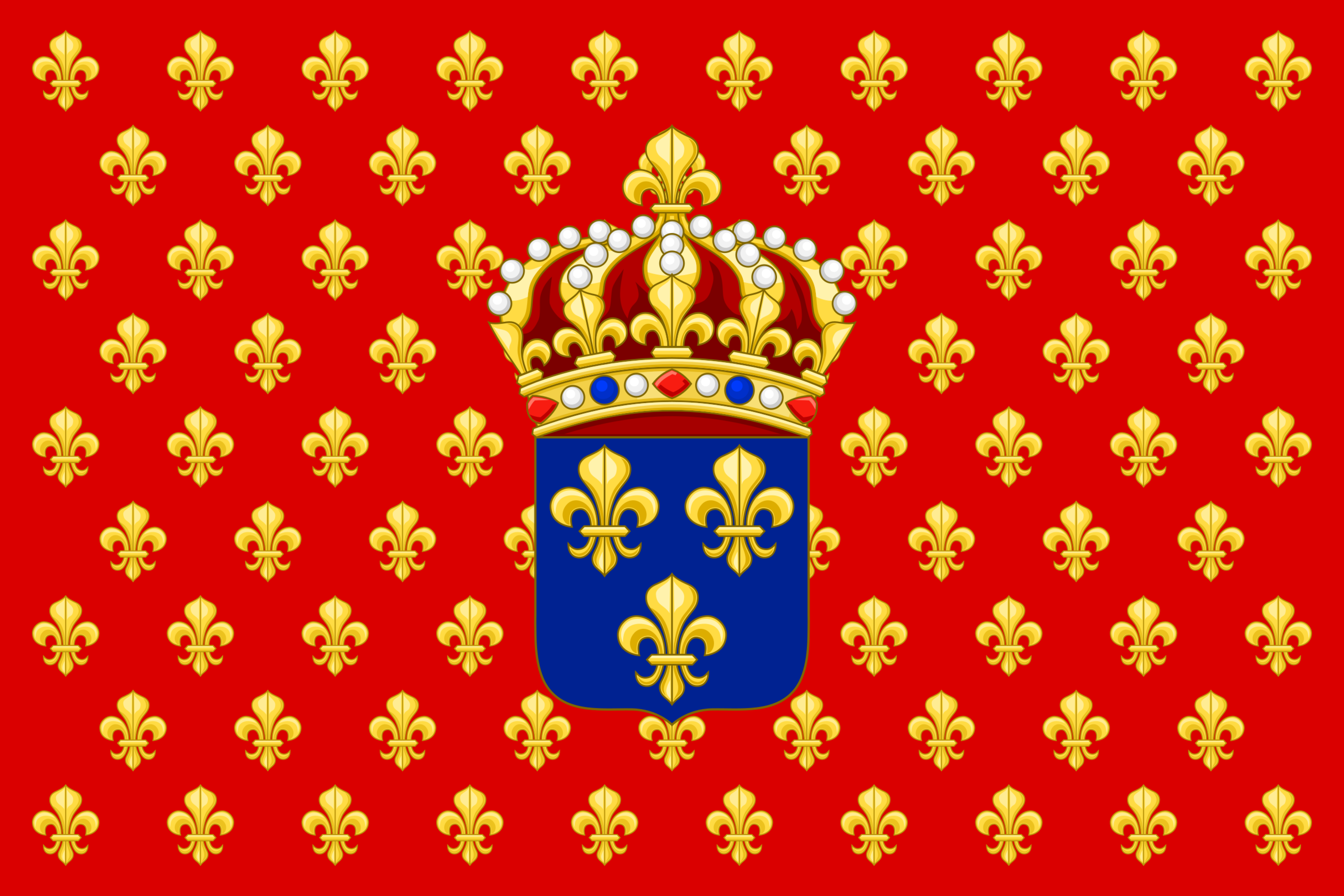
Civil ensign
France
(1600's–1789)

National flag
Civil ensign
France
(1689–1789, 1814–1830)

national flag
Civil ensign
French Algeria
(1848–1910)

National flag
Civil ensign
French Indochina
(1923–1949)

national flag
Civil ensign
French Morocco
(1912–1956)

National flag
Civil ensign
The Gambia
(1889–1965)

Germany
(1896–1918)

National flag
Civil ensign
Germany
(1919–1933)

National flag
Civil ensign
Germany
(1933–1935)

Germany
(1935–1945)

National flag
Civil ensign
East Germany
(1959–1973)

National flag
Civil ensign
East Germany
(1959–1973)
(Alternative)

National flag
Civil ensign
West Germany
(1949–1990)

National flag
Civil ensign
Ghana
(1963–1964, 1966–2003)

National flag
Civil ensign
Ghana
(1964–1966)

National flag
Civil ensign
Gold Coast
(1877–1957)

National flag
Civil ensign
Great Britain
(1707–1801)

National flag
Civil ensign
Greece
(1774–1821)

National flag
Civil ensign
Greece
(1822–1828)

National flag
Civil ensign
Greece
(1828–1970)

National flag
Civil ensign
Haiti
(1964–1986)

National flag
Civil ensign
Hanover
(1816–1837)

National flag
Hong Kong
(1876–1955)
(Unofficial)

National flag
Hong Kong
(1955–1959)
(Unofficial)

National flag
Hong Kong
(1959–1997)
(Unofficial)

National flag
Civil ensign
Hungary
(1921–1946)

National flag
Civil ensign
Hungary
(1950–1957)

National flag
Civil ensign
India
(1880–1947)

National flag
Civil ensign
Persia and later Iran
(1910–1933)

National flag
Civil ensign
Iran
(1933–1964)

National flag
Civil ensign
Iran
(1964–1980)

National flag
Civl ensign
Ireland
(1701–1801)

National flag
Civil ensign
Ireland
(1801–1922)

National flag
Civil ensign
Piedmont-Sardinia and later Italy
(1851–1946)

National flag
Civil ensign
Jamaica
(1906–1957)

National flag
Civil ensign
Jamaica
(1957–1962)

National flag
Civil ensign
Jamaica
(1962)

National flag
Civil ensign
Kazakhstan
(1991–1992)

National flag
Civil ensign
British East Africa and later Kenya
(1895–1963)

National flag
Civil ensign
Kyrgyzstan
(1991–1992)

National flag
Civil ensign
Lucca
(1200's-1799)

National flag
Civil ensign
Lucca
(1801–1805)

National flag
civil ensign
Lucca
(1818–1824)

National flag
Civil ensign
Lucca
(1819–1820)

National flag
Civil ensign
Lucca
(1820–1847)

National flag
Civil ensign
Malaya
(1957–1963)

National flag
Civil ensign
Malta
(1898–1943)

National flag
Civil ensign
Malta
(1943–1964)

National flag
Civil ensign
Mauritius
(1906–1968)

National flag
Civil Ensign
Mecklenburg-Schwerin
(1863–1918)

National flag
Civil Ensign
Modena and Reggio
(1830–1859)

National flag
Civil ensign
Montenegro
(1905–1918)

National flag
Civil ensign
Newfoundland
(1904–1949)

National flag
Civil ensign
Nigeria
(1914–1952)

National flag
Civil ensign
Nigeria
(1952–1960)

National flag
Civil ensign
North Borneo
(1882–1902)

National flag
Civil ensign
North Borneo
(1902–1942, 1945–1946)

National flag
Civil ensign
North Borneo
(1948–1963)

National flag
Civil ensign
Ottoman Empire
(1774–1793)

National flag
Civil ensign
Pakistan
(1956–1958)

National flag
Civil ensign
Palestine
(1927–1948)

National flag
Civil ensign
Parma and Piacenza
(1851–1859)

National flag
Civil ensign
Piedmont-Sardinia
(1720–1799)

National flag
Civil ensign
Piedmont-Sardinia
(1799–1802)

National flag
Civil ensign
Piedmont-Sardinia
(1802–1814)

National flag
Civil ensign
Piedmont-Sardinia
(1814–1816)

National flag
Civil ensign
Piedmont-Sardinia
(1816–1848)

National flag
Civil ensign
Poland
(1919–1928)

National flag
Civil ensign
Poland
(1928–1939)

National flag
Civil ensign
Poland
(1955–1980)

National flag
Civil ensign
Poland
(1980–1990)

National flag
Civil ensign
Prussia
(1823–1863)

National flag
Civil ensign
Prussia
(1863–1892)

National flag
Civil ensign
Prussia
(1892–1918)

National flag
Prussia
(1918–1935)

National flag
Civil ensign
Ryukyu Islands
(1952–1967)

National flag
Civil ensign
Ryukyu Islands
(1967–1972)

National flag
Civil ensign
Sarawak
(1870–1946)

National flag
Civil ensign
Sarawak
(1947–1963)

National flag
Civil ensign
Saxony-Anhalt
(1991–2017)

National flag
Civil ensign
Serbia
(1835–1918)

National flag
Civil ensign
Serbia
(2006–2010)

National flag
Civil ensign
Seychelles
(1903–1961)

National flag
Civil ensign
Seychelles
(1961–1976)

National flag
Civil ensign
Sierra Leone
(1916–1961)

National flag
Civil ensign
Singapore
(1946–1952)

National flag
Civil ensign
Singapore
(1952–1959)

National flag
Civil ensign
Solomon Islands
(1906–1947)

National flag
Civil ensign
Solomon Islands
(1947–1956)

National flag
Civil ensign
Solomon Islands
(1956–1977)

National flag
Civil ensign
South Africa
(1910–1912)

National flag
South Africa
(1912–1928)
(Unofficial)

National flag
Civil ensign
South Africa
(1912–1951)

National flag
Civil ensign
South Australia
(1870–1876)

National flag
Civil ensign
Spain
(1785–1927)

National flag
Civil ensign
Spain
(1931–1939)

National flag
Civil ensign
Spanish Morocco
(1937–1956)

National flag
Civil ensign
Straits Settlements
(1874–1904)

National flag
Civil ensign
Straits Settlements
(1904–1942, 1945–1946)

National flag
Civil ensign
Tajikistan
(1991–1992)

National flag
Civil ensign
Tangier International Zone
(1953–1957)

National flag
Civil ensign
Trinidad and Tobago
(1889–1958)

National flag
Civil ensign
Trinidad and Tobago
(1958–1962)

National flag
Civil ensign
Turkmenistan
(1991–1992)

National flag
Civil ensign
Turks and Caicos Islands
(1968–1999)

National flag
Civil Ensign
Tuscany
(1600's-1737)

National flag
Civil ensign
Tuscany
(1781–1800, 1815–1848, 1849–1860)

National flag
Tuscany
(1824–1848, 1849–1860)

National flag
Civil ensign
Ukraine
(1991–1992)

National flag
Civil ensign
Venezuela
(1863–1905)

National flag
Civil ensign
Venezuela
(1905–1930)

National flag
Civil ensign
Venezuela
(1930–2006)

National flag
Civil ensign
Victoria
(1870–1877)

National flag
Civil ensign
Yugoslavia
(1919–1943)

National flag
Civil ensign
Yugoslavia
(1950–1992)

National flag
Civil ensign
Yugoslavia and later Serbia and Montenegro
(1992–2006)

== See also ==
- Civil and merchant ensigns
- Civil flag
- Civil air ensign
- Gallery of sovereign state civil ensigns
