= Flags of German states =

A map of Germany, showing all the state flags and coat of arms

All German states have a Landesflagge (flag of the state, sometimes known as a civil flag), that may be used by anyone. Some states have another variant, often showing the state coat of arms, called the Dienstflagge (service flag or government flag, sometimes known as a state flag), normally for use by official government offices only. In addition to these flags, in a few states there are variants exclusively for the state senate, or for state-operated ships. In some cases, there are specific flags for high-ranking officials, mainly used as car flags. Frequently, the flags are used in vertical variants.

== Current state flags ==
Since German reunification in 1990, there are 16 states and state flags.

Civil flag	State flag	Administrative division	Adopted	Description	Ref.
		Baden-Württemberg	1954–present	Flag of Baden-Württemberg	
		Bavaria	1949–present	Flag of Bavaria	
		Berlin	1954–present	Flag of Berlin	
		Brandenburg	1991–present	Flag of Brandenburg	
		Bremen	1952–present	Flag of Bremen	
		Hamburg	Civil flag 1751–present; state flag introduced in 1897, confirmed in 1952	Flag of Hamburg	
		Hesse	1949–present	Flag of Hesse	
		Lower Saxony	1951–present	Flag of Lower Saxony	
		Mecklenburg–Western Pomerania	1991–present	Flag of Mecklenburg–Western Pomerania	
		North Rhine-Westphalia	1953–present	Flag of North Rhine-Westphalia	
		Rhineland-Palatinate	1948–present	Flag of Rhineland-Palatinate	
		Saarland	1957–present	Flag of Saarland	
		Saxony	1991–present	Flag of Saxony	
		Saxony-Anhalt	1991–present	Flag of Saxony-Anhalt	
		Schleswig-Holstein	1948–present	Flag of Schleswig-Holstein	
		Thuringia	1991–present	Flag of Thuringia	

== Historical flags ==
Flag	Administrative division	Adopted	Description
	South Baden	1945–1952	Flag of Baden
	Württemberg-Baden	1945–1952	
	Württemberg-Hohenzollern	1945–1952	

=== German Democratic Republic ===
Flag	Administrative division	Adopted	Description
	East Berlin	1956–1990	Flag of Berlin
	Brandenburg	1945–1952	Flag of Brandenburg
	Mecklenburg	1945–1952	Flag of Mecklenburg
	Saxony-Anhalt	1945–1952	Flag of Saxony-Anhalt

=== Greater German Reich ===
Flag	Administrative division	Adopted	Description
	Gau Saxony	1933-1945	
	Free State of Prussia	1933-1945	Flag of Prussia
	State of Thuringia	1933-1945	Flag of Thuringia

=== Weimar Republic/Nazi Germany ===
==== Constituent states ====
Flag	Administrative division	Adopted	Description
	Free State of Anhalt	1918–1945	
	Republic of Baden	1918–1945	Flag of Baden
	Free State of Brunswick	1918–1946	
	Free State of Coburg	1918–1920	
	People's State of Hesse	1918–1945	Flag of Hesse
	Free State of Lippe	1918–1947	
	Free City of Lübeck	?–1937	
	Free State of Mecklenburg-Schwerin	1918–1933	Flag of Mecklenburg
	Free State of Mecklenburg-Strelitz	1918–1933	Flag of Mecklenburg
	Free State of Oldenburg	1918–1946	
	Free State of Prussia	1918–1933	Flag of Prussia
	People's State of Reuss	1919–1920	
	Free State of Schaumburg-Lippe	1918–1946	
	Free State of Saxe-Altenburg	1918–1920	
	Free State of Saxe-Meiningen	1918–1920	
	Free State of Saxe-Weimar-Eisenach	1918–1920	
	Free State of Schwarzburg-Rudolstadt	1918–1920	
	Free State of Schwarzburg-Sondershausen	1918–1920	
	Free State of Waldeck-Pyrmont	1918–1929	
	Free People's State of Württemberg	1918–1945	

==== Provinces of Prussia ====
Flag	Administrative division	Adopted	Description
	Province of Brandenburg	1918–1945	Flag of Brandenburg
	East Prussia	1918–1945	
	Province of Hanover	1918–1945	
	Province of Hesse-Nassau	1918–1944	
	Province of Hohenzollern	1918–1945	
	Province of Kurhessen	1944–1945	
	Province of Lower Silesia and Province of Silesia	1919–1945	Flag of Silesia
	Province of Nassau	1944–1945	
	Province of Pomerania	1882–1945	Flag of Western Pomerania
	Posen-West Prussia	1922–1938	
	Rhine Province	1922–1945	
	Province of Saxony	1918–1945	Flag of Saxony-Anhalt
	Province of Schleswig-Holstein	1918–1945	Flag of Schleswig-Holstein
	Province of Upper Silesia	1919–1938; 1941–1945	Flag of Upper Silesia
	Province of Westphalia	1918–1945	

=== German Empire ===
==== Constituent states ====
Flag	Administrative division	Adopted	Description
	Alsace-Lorraine	1891–1918	
	Duchy of Anhalt	1863–1935	
	Grand Duchy of Baden	1891–1935	Flag of Baden
	Kingdom of Bavaria	1806–present	Flag of Bavaria
	Free Hanseatic City of Bremen	1891–present	Flag of Bremen
	Duchy of Brunswick	1830–1935	
	Free and Hanseatic City of Hamburg	1834–present	Flag of Hamburg
	Grand Duchy of Hesse	1806–1918	Flag of Hesse
	Principality of Lippe	1789–1918	
	The Free and Hanseatic City of Lübeck	1815–1937	
	Grand Duchy of Mecklenburg-Schwerin	1813–1918	Flag of Mecklenburg
	Grand Duchy of Mecklenburg-Strelitz	1813–1918	Flag of Mecklenburg
	Grand Duchy of Oldenburg	1871–1918	
	Kingdom of Prussia	1892–1918	Flag of Prussia
	Principality of Reuss-Greiz	1806–1918	
	Principality of Reuss-Gera	1806–1918	
	Kingdom of Saxony	1815–1918	Flag of Saxony
	Duchy of Saxe-Altenburg	1893–1918	
	Duchy of Saxe-Coburg and Gotha	1911–1920	
	Duchy of Saxe-Meiningen	1680–1918	
	Principality of Schaumburg-Lippe	1880–1935	
	Saxe-Weimar-Eisenach	1897–1920	
	Schwarzburg-Rudolstadt	???–1918	
	Schwarzburg-Sondershausen	???–1918	
	Principality of Waldeck and Pyrmont	1830–1929	
	Kingdom of Württemberg	1816–1918	

==== Provinces of Prussia ====
Flag	Administrative division	Adopted	Description
	Berlin	1861–1912	Flag of Berlin
	Province of Pomerania	1882–1945	Flag of Western Pomerania
	West Prussia	1886–1920	

== Minority flags ==
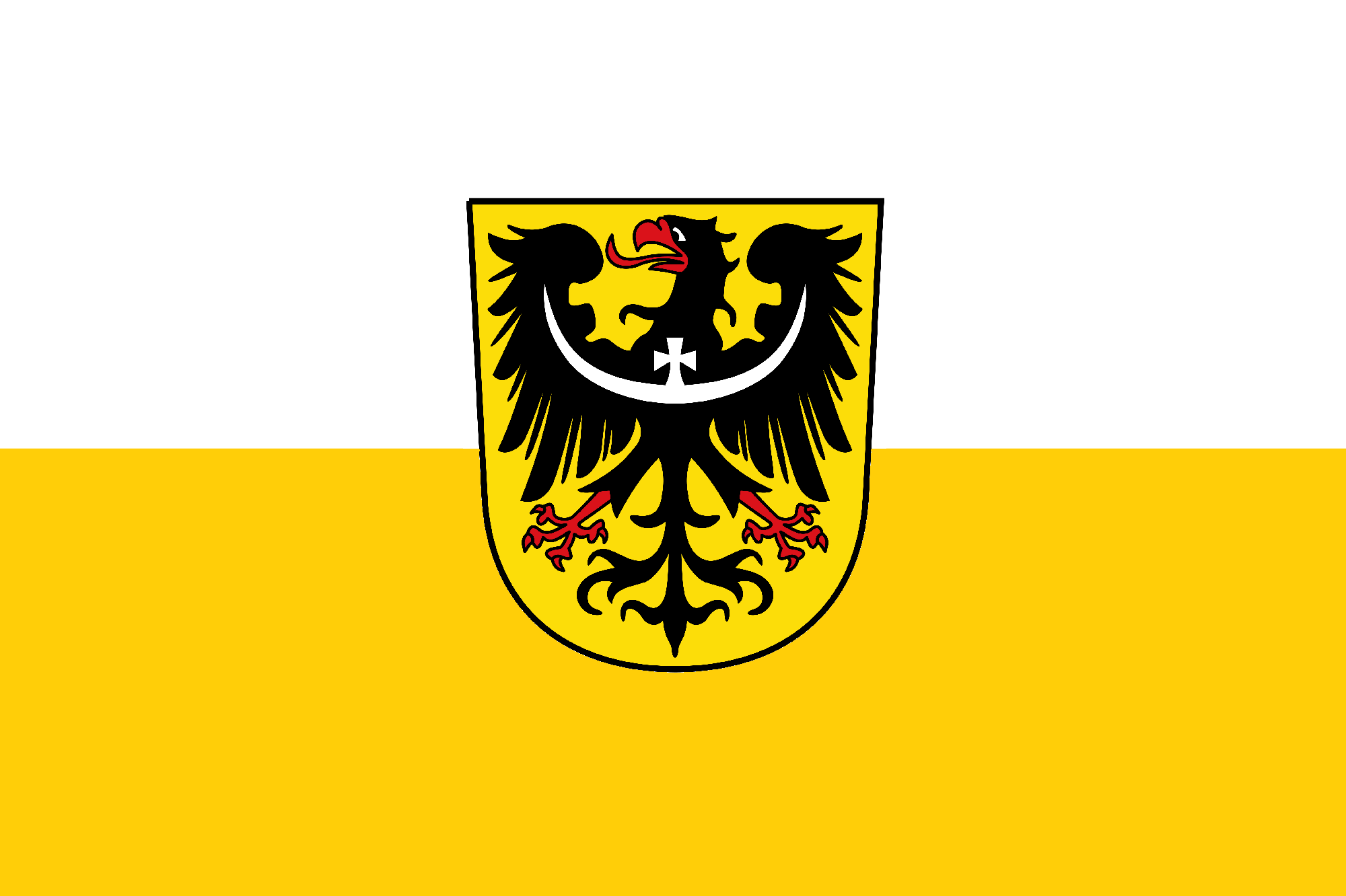
Flag of Silesians (with eagle)

Flag of Silesians (Saxony)

Flag of Sorbs (Saxony)

== See also ==
- Coats of arms of German states
- List of district flags of Germany
- Lists of German municipal flags
