= Flag of Baden-Württemberg =

Official flag of the German state of Baden-Württemberg

- State civil flag (Landesflagge)
- Use: Civil flag
- Proportion: 3:5
- Adopted: 11 November 1953
- State Flag (Landesdienstflagge), Greater arms
- Use: State flag
- Proportion: 3:5
- Adopted: 29 September 1954
- State Flag (Landesdienstflagge), Lesser arms
- Use: State flag
- Proportion: 3:5
- Adopted: 29 September 1954

The flag of Baden-Württemberg, a state in Germany, has three variants. The civil flag (Landesflagge) has one design, while the state flag (Landesdienstflagge), has two designs. All three flags are a black over gold bi-color, while the state flag has one of two variants of the state arms centered on the flag. The flag, while identical, has no symbolism of or relation with the flag of the Austrian Empire.

== History ==
The flag of Baden-Württemberg was created in 1952, after the merger of the German states of (South) Baden, Württemberg-Baden, and Württemberg-Hohenzollern, which had been created by the occupying forces after World War II. Baden retained its yellow-red-yellow horizontal triband, while the state of Württemberg-Hohenzollern kept the Württemberg black-red horizontal bicolour. Württemberg-Baden employed a horizontal black-red-yellow tricolor, the same as the current German flag, but defaced with the state's arms. The colors chosen for the flag of the newly merged Baden-Württemberg were black and gold, and are defined in the constitution of the state of Baden-Württemberg, adopted on 11 November 1953.

Electoral Palatinate

Peasants' army

Electoral Palatinate - war flag (1604)

Electorate of Baden (1803–1806) and Grand Duchy of Baden (1806-1848)

Electorate of Baden (1848–1862)

Electorate of Baden (1862–1871)

Electorate of Baden (1871–1891)

Grand Duchy of Baden, Republic of Baden and (South) Baden (1891–1952)

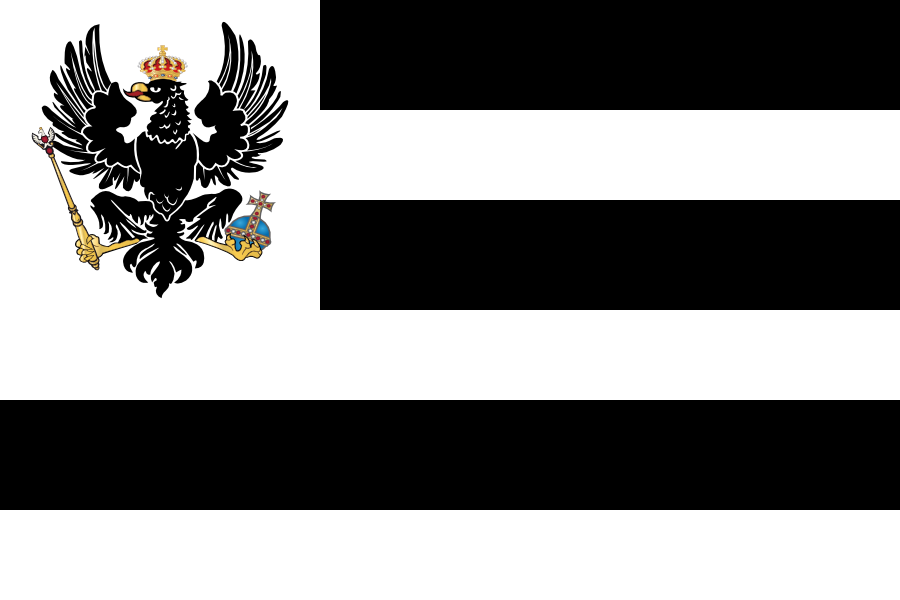
Hohenzollern-Sigmaringen (1576–1850)

Province of Hohenzollern (1882–1935)

Principality of Leyen (1806–1813)

Duchy of Württemberg (1495–1803)

Kingdom of Württemberg, Free People's State of Württemberg and Württemberg-Hohenzollern (1816–1952)

Württemberg-Baden (1945–1952)

Flag of the Royal Yacht Club of Württemberg in Friedrichshafen (1913–1918)

Kingdom of Württemberg (1809-1816)

== See also ==
- Flags of German states
