= Landtag of Württemberg-Hohenzollern =

German state parliament

State Parliament of Württemberg-Hohenzollern Landtag für Württemberg-Hohenzollern

Type
- Type: unicameral of the Landtag

History
- Founded: May 18, 1947
- Disbanded: May 17, 1952
- Preceded by: Advisory State Assembly of Württemberg-Hohenzollern
- Succeeded by: Landtag of Baden-Württemberg

Leadership
- President: Karl Gengler, CDU
- First Vice-President: Fritz Fleck, SPD

Structure
- Seats: 60
- Political groups: Government (55): CDU (32); SPD (12); DVP (11); Opposition (5): KPD (5)
- Committees: 5: Petitions and Rules of Procedure; Finance; Administrative and Legal Affairs; Food and Agriculture; Social Affairs

Meeting place
- Bebenhausen Abbey

The Landtag of Württemberg-Hohenzollern was the first freely elected Parliament of the state of Württemberg-Hohenzollern following the states formation after the Second World War inside of the French zone of occupation. The Landtag was the body succeeding the Advisory State Assembly of Württemberg-Hohenzollern, the convention composed of municipal delegates that was tasked with drafting a constitution for the state. The first election to the Landtag was held simultaneously with the referendum over the adoption of the constitution drafted by the Advisory State Assembly on 18 May 1947.

The Landtag first met on 3 June 1947 in Tübingen. It was elected for a term of four years; therefore the next state election should have been in early 1951. However, due to the planned unification of the three German states Württemberg-Hohenzollern, Baden and Württemberg-Baden, the President of Württemberg-Hohenzollern Gebhard Müller extended the term of the Landtag by decree until the three states unified. The constitutional amendment required for this decree was approved by voters simultaneously with the referendum over the unification of the three states on 9 December 1951. The amendment to the constitution had become necessary after the Federal Constitutional Court had declared the Erste Neugliederungsgesetz des Bundes, a law of the Bundestag that would have extended the Landtag's term, unconstitutional. The ruling which was rendered by the Second Senate on 9 September 1951 was the first ever ruling of the court.

== Convening ==
=== Presidium ===
At the Landtags first meeting its Members elected Karl Gengler (CDU) as President of the Landtag and Fritz Fleck (SPD) and Karl Kübler (DVP) as his first and second deputy respectively. After Karl Kübler resigned from the post on 22 June 1948 the members of the Landtag elected Eduard Leuze (DVP) as second deputy of the President of the Landtag instead.

=== Distribution of Seats ===
At the first state election on 18 May 1947 the CDU won an absoultue Majority with a 54,2% share of the vote. The SPD received 20,8%, the DVP 17,7% and the KPD 7,3%. Therefore, the seat distribution was as follows:

Party	Seats	Party leader
CDU	32 Seats	Franz Gog
SPD	12 Seats	Oskar Kalbfell
DVP	11 Seats	Eduard Leuze
KPD	5 Seats	Wilfried Acker
Total	60 Seats	

=== Committees ===
The Landtag had five standing committees:

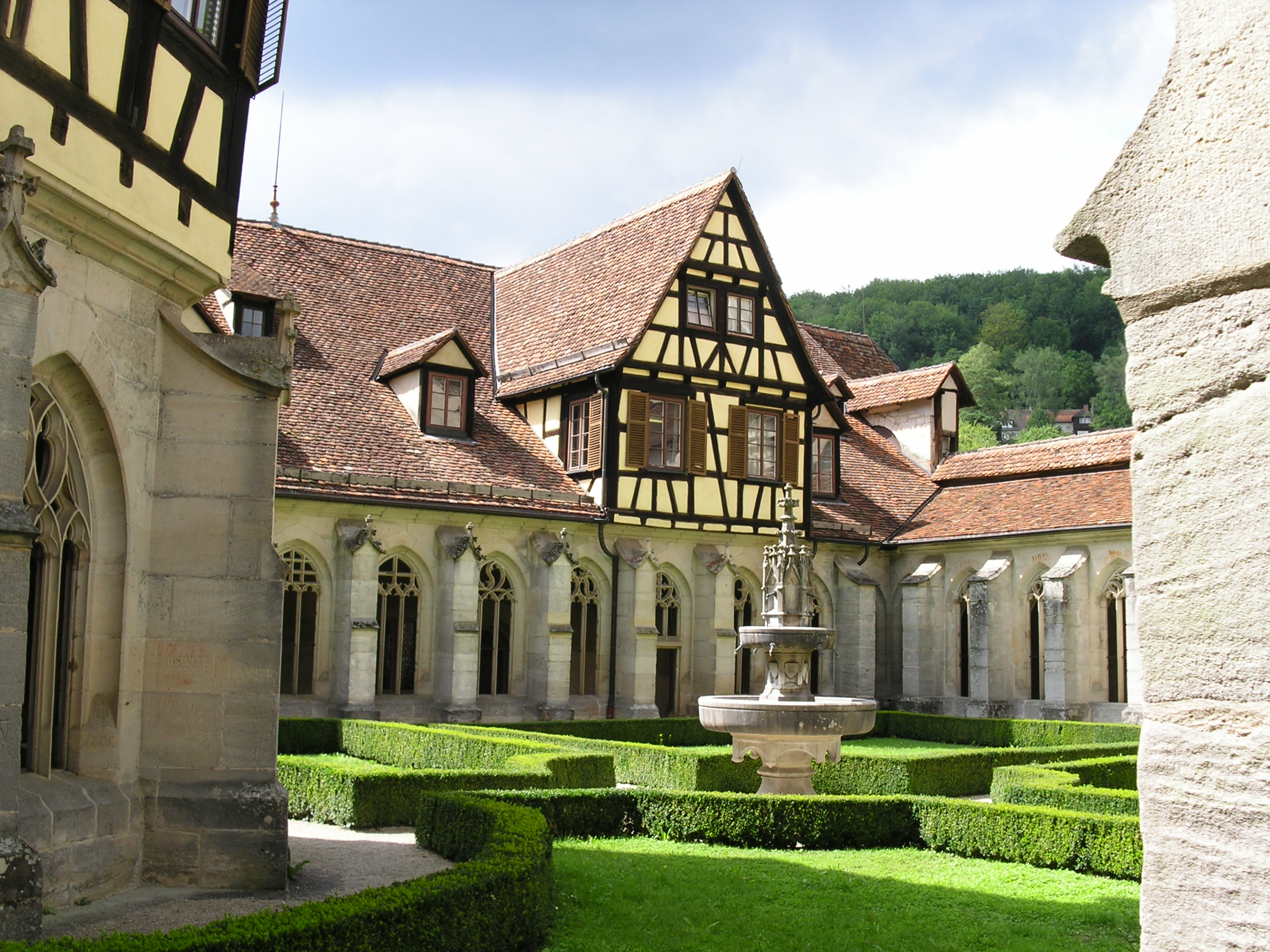
Bebenhausen Abbey – meeting place of the Landtags of Württemberg-Hohenzollern

Committees	Chair
Finance Committee	Paul Binder, CDU
Social Affairs Committee	Oskar Kalbfell, SPD
Food and Agriculture Committee	Bernhard Bauknecht, CDU
Petitions and Rules of Procedure Committee	Ferdinand Zeeb, KPD
Administrative and Legal Affairs Committee	Eduard Leuze, DVP

=== Meeting place ===
The Landtag met in Bebenhausen Abbey, an abbey in the city Tübingen, which was used as the capital of Württemberg-Hohenzollern. All 118 sessions of the state parliament where held in the winter refectory of the abbey, since it was the only heatable room that was large enough. Many other rooms of the former monastery where used by the state: The President of the Landtag worked from the royal breakfast room, the blue hall was used for official events and proceedings while the green hall was used as a lounge for the members of parliament.
