= Flag of Bavaria =

German state flag

Bavaria
- Rautenflagge (lozenge flag)
- Use: Civil and state flag, civil ensign
- Proportion: not specified, often follows 3:5 ratio of German flag
- Adopted: Historical (13th/14th century)
- Design: An array of 21 or more lozenges of blue and white, with or without arms.
- Streifenflagge (striped flag)
- Use: Civil and state flag, civil ensign
- Proportion: Not specified, often follows 3:5 ratio of German flag
- Adopted: 1806
- Design: A bicolor of white over blue.

There are two official flags of Bavaria: the striped type and the lozenge type, both of which are white and blue. Both flags are historically associated with the royal Bavarian Wittelsbach family, which ruled Bavaria from 1180 to 1918.

== Overview ==
Both horizontal and vertical flags with stripes or white and blue lozenges without arms can be considered official flags of the state, in Bavaria called the Staatsflagge. They may be used by civilians and by government, including use on state motor vehicles. The striped and lozenge styles have equal status, and offices or users are free to choose between them.

The variants defaced with the arms are unofficial, and the use of the symbols by civilians is strictly speaking illegal, but is tolerated. A lozenge-style flag with the arms is common.

The lozenges are not set in number, except there must be at least 21, and the top right (incomplete) lozenge must be white.

The exact origin of the lozenges is disputed. They are believed to be representative of the lakes and rivers of Bavaria or perhaps the sky, as in the Bavarian anthem, which says "die Farben Seines Himmels, Weiß und Blau" – "the colors of His sky/heaven, white and blue".

In vexillology, flags are described and displayed from the front (obverse). In Bavaria, however, the description of the flag is based on heraldic rules. That is, the description is made from the point of view of a shield-bearer who is behind the coat of arms, and in this case, behind the flag. Thus, the right upper corner, reserved for a truncated white lozenge, is on the top left (adjacent to the flagpole) for the viewer.

=== Colors ===
The Constitution of the Free State of Bavaria defines the "colors of the state" as simply "white and blue", with no further specifications. On 2 June 1999, the federal cabinet introduced a corporate design for the German government which defined "blue" as RGB 0,119,182 or PANTONE® 307, but it is unclear if these guidelines apply to the states, and in any case, in practice the specific shades can vary wildly, especially in unofficial uses.

Colour scheme	Blue
CMYK	100.0.100.20
CMYK	85.0.100.0 (Note: For newspapers.)
Pantone (approximation)	307
Decimal RGB	0,119,182

== Historical flags ==
Flag	Years of use	Government	Notes
	1353–1392	Bavaria-Landshut	Bavaria-Landshut was a duchy in the Holy Roman Empire from 1353 to 1503.
	1392–1505	Bavaria-Munich	Bavaria-Munich was a duchy that was a constituent state of the Holy Roman Empire from 1392 to 1505.
	1505–1623	Duchy of Bavaria	The Duchy of Bavaria was a frontier region in the southeastern part of the Merovingian kingdom from the sixth through the eighth century. It was settled by Bavarian tribes and ruled by dukes under Frankish overlordship.
	1623–1806	Electorate of Bavaria	The Electorate of Bavaria was an independent hereditary electorate of the Holy Roman Empire from 1623 to 1806 when it was succeeded by the Kingdom of Bavaria.
	1806–1918	Kingdom of Bavaria	The Kingdom of Bavaria was a German state that succeeded the former Electorate of Bavaria in 1806 and continued to exist until 1918.
	1918–1919	People's State of Bavaria	The People's State of Bavaria was a short-lived socialist state in Bavaria from 1918 to 1919.
	1919	Bavarian Soviet Republic	The Bavarian or Munich Soviet Republic was a short-lived unrecognised socialist state in Bavaria during the German Revolution of 1918–19.
	1919–1933	Free State of Bavaria	Bavarian state in the Weimar Republic.
	1933–1935	Gau Munich-Upper Bavaria	The Gau Munich–Upper Bavaria was an administrative division of Nazi Germany in Upper Bavaria from 1933 to 1945.
	1935–1945	Gau Munich-Upper Bavaria	The Gau Munich–Upper Bavaria was an administrative division of Nazi Germany in Upper Bavaria from 1933 to 1945.
	1945–1949	American occupation zone	The American zone in Southern Germany consisted of Bavaria (without the Rhine Palatinate Region and the Lindau District, both part of the French zone) and Hesse (without Rhenish Hesse and Montabaur Region, both part of the French zone) with a new capital in Wiesbaden, and of northern parts of Württemberg and Baden.
	1949–present	Bavaria	Modern state of Bavaria under the Federal Republic of Germany. Both flags (lozenge and striped) are equally official.

== See also ==
- BMW (logo based upon the flag)
- FC Bayern Munich (logo based upon the flag)
- Flags of German states
