= Jersey Red Ensign =

Civil ensign used by ships registered in the Channel Island of Jersey

- Proportion: 1:2
- Adopted: 23 June 2010
- Design: defaced red ensign

The Jersey Red Ensign, officially the Jersey Defaced Red Ensign, is the civil ensign used by ships registered in the Channel Island of Jersey. It was created in 2010 after approval from Queen Elizabeth II and the States of Jersey. The flag consists of a British Red Ensign with the coat of arms of Jersey surmounted by a Plantagenet crown.

== History ==
Prior to 2010, Jersey had no unique civil ensign for maritime usage. Jersey-registered vessels instead used the plain British red ensign. This lack of a unique civil ensign for Jersey — and the fact that fellow Channel Island Guernsey had one — led Jersey's maritime authorities to request a unique Jersey red ensign be created, and a proposal was produced after discussions with the Garter King of Arms and the British College of Arms. Because it included the coat of arms of Jersey and the Plantagenet crown on it, as a symbol of Jersey's link with the English (and later British) Crown since King John, the States of Jersey were obliged to ask Queen Elizabeth II's approval for the proposed design.

The Queen granted consent for the design in April 2010 and the States of Jersey opened a public consultation for the new ensign. Following the consultation the States of Jersey unanimously agreed to introduce the Jersey red ensign in June 2010. The Economic Development Minister, Alan Maclean, stated that adoption of the new Jersey Red Ensign would be voluntary and Jersey registered vessels could continue to fly the British red ensign if they wished to. Owners of unregistered ships would be obliged to register them should they wish to use the new Jersey Red Ensign.

== See also ==
- Defacement (flag)
- Flag of Jersey
- Red Ensign Group
