= Flag of Brandenburg =

Brandenburg
- German: Landes- und Landesdienstflagge
- Use: Civil and state flag
- Proportion: 3:5
- Adopted: 30 January 1991; 35 years ago
- Design: 1989

The flag of Brandenburg is a horizontal bi-color of red over white, with the arms of the state (land), in the center. The coat of arms of the state shows on a shield in white (silver) a red eagle, looking to the right, with wings decorated with trefoils in gold and armored gold. In its current form, the flag was adopted on 30 January 1991, with further enshrinement in Article 4 of the Constitution of the State of Brandenburg.

== History ==
The Margraviate of Brandenburg, also known as the March of Brandenburg, played a pivotal role in forming the nucleus of what over the course of history became the Kingdom of Prussia and the German Empire. The Märkischer Adler, or red eagle of the Margraviate of Brandenburg was adopted by Margrave Gero in the 10th century. The bi-color of red over white was used by the Province of Brandenburg in both the Kingdom of Prussia and also in the Free State of Prussia.

In 1945 a new flag was issued, derived from the new coat of arms created after the war. In 1952, when East Germany dissolved the states, that flag fell into disuse. Upon the re-establishment of the state of Brandenburg in 1990, the traditional colors of red over white were adopted as the state flag once again.

== Gallery ==
Historical Flags
Margraviate of Brandenburg-Küstrin (1535–1571)

Margraviate of Brandenburg (c. 1684)

Margraviate of Brandenburg (1660–1750)

Ensign of Brandenburg Navy

Prussian Province of Brandenburg (1815–1945)

State of Brandenburg (1945–1952)

== See also ==
- Flags of German states
