= List of district flags of Germany =

This is a list of flags of districts of Germany. The flags are listed per state. Most districts in Germany have both horizontal and vertical flags. These flags usually had coat of arms on them. Therefore, the list will also discuss the coat of arms. Please note that some of the flags listed are either de facto flags or not yet approved.

== Baden-Württemberg ==
Flag	District	Date	Description
	Baden-Baden	1421 – present	The yellow-red-yellow horizontal flag with the coat of arms.
	Freiburg im Breisgau	1368 – present	The flag with a Saint George cross
	Heidelberg	1938 – present	A black-yellow horizontal bicolor.
	Heilbronn (Stadtkreis)	19th century – present	A red-white-blue horizontal tricolor.
	Karlsruhe (Stadtkreis)	1895 – present	A red-yellow-red horizontal flag.
	Mannheim	1613 – present	A blue-white-red horizontal tricolor.
	Mannheim	1896 – present	Vertical flag with the coat of arms. The coat of arms consists of the Palatine Lion representing Mannheim as the last capital city of Electoral Palatinate and a Wolfsangel representing boundaries.
	Ofterdingen	6 June 1982 – present	A yellow-blue horizontal bicolor with the coat of arms.
	Pforzheim	18th century – present	A white-blue horizontal bicolor with the coat of arms. The dexter represents Baden. The yellow also represents Baden and the white and blue is said to have come from the House of Wittelsbach.
	Stuttgart	1950 – present	A black-yellow horizontal bicolor with the coat of arms. The coat of arms is a reference to a legend in which Liudolf, Duke of Swabia founded a ranch, a horse breeding center and riding school on where the city is located now.
	Stuttgart	1950 – present	Vertical flag.
	Ulm	1244 – present	A black-white horizontal bicolor. The meaning of the colours is still unknown to this day.

Flag of Alb-Donau-Kreis

Flag of Biberach

Flag of Bodenseekreis

Flag of Bodenseekreis (variant)

Flag of Böblingen

Flag of Breisgau-Hochschwarzwald

Flag of Calw

Flag of Emmendingen

Flag of Enzkreis

Flag of Esslingen

Flag of Freudenstadt

Flag of Göppingen

Flag of Heidelberg

Flag of Heidenheim

Flag of Heilbronn (Landkreis)

Flag of Hohenlohe

Flag of Karlsruhe (Landkreis)

Flag of Konstanz

Flag of Lörrach

Flag of Ludwigsburg

Flag of Main-Tauber-Kreis

Flag of Neckar-Odenwald-Kreis

Flag of Ortenaukreis

Flag of Ostalbkreis

Flag of Rastatt

Flag of Ravensburg

Flag of Rems-Murr-Kreis

Flag of Reutlingen

Flag of Rhein-Neckar-Kreis

Flag of Rottweil

Flag of Schwarzwald-Baar-Kreis

Flag of Schwäbisch Hall

Flag of Sigmaringen

Flag of Tübingen

Flag of Waldshut

Flag of Zollernalbkreis

== Bavaria ==
Flag	District	Date	Description
	Landshut	23 May 1973 (de facto) –	A white flag two rows of blue lozenges on the left and right with the coat of arms.
	Landshut	23 May 1973 –	A white-blue horizontal flag with the coat of arms.
	Aichach-Friedberg	1 January 1973 –	A green-yellow horizontal flag with the coat of arms.

Flag of Amberg

Flag of Altötting

Flag of Amberg-Sulzbach

Flag of Ansbach (Landkreis)

Flag of Ansbach (Stadtkreis)

Flag of Aschaffenburg (Landkreis)

Flag of Aschaffenburg (Stadtkreis)

Flag of Augsburg (Landkreis)

Flag of Augsburg (Stadtkreis)

Flag of Bad Kissingen

Flag of Bad Tölz-Wolfratshausen

Flag of Bamberg (Landkreis)

Flag of Bamberg (Stadtkreis)

Flag of Bayreuth (Landkreis)

Flag of Bayreuth (Stadtkreis)

Flag of Berchtesgadener Land

Flag of Cham

Flag of Coburg (Landkreis)

Flag of Coburg (Stadtkreis)

Flag of Dachau

Flag of Deggendorf

Flag of Dillingen

Flag of Dingolfing-Landau

Flag of Donau-Ries

Flag of Ebersberg

Flag of Eichstätt

Flag of Erding

Flag of Erlangen

Flag of Erlangen-Höchstadt

Flag of Forchheim

Flag of Freising

Flag of Freyung-Grafenau

Flag of Fürstenfeldbruck

Flag of Fürth (Stadtkreis)

Flag of Fürth (Landkreis)

Flag of Garmisch-Partenkirchen

Flag of Günzburg

Flag of Haßberge

Flag of Hof (Landkreis)

Flag of Ingolstadt

Flag of Kaufbeuren

Flag of Kelheim

Flag of Kempten

Flag of Kitzingen

Flag of Kronach

Flag of Kulmbach

Flag of Landsberg

Flag of Landshut (Stadtkreis)

Flag of Lichtenfels

Flag of Lindau

Flag of Main-Spessart

Flag of Memmingen

Flag of Miesbach

Flag of Miltenberg

Flag of Mühldorf

Flag of Munich (Landkreis)

Flag of Munich (Stadtkreis; striped variant)

Flag of Munich (Stadtkreis; lozengy variant)

Flag of Neuburg-Schrobenhausen

Flag of Neumarkt

Flag of Neustadt (Aisch)-Bad Windsheim

Flag of Neustadt an der Waldnaab

Flag of Neu-Ulm

Flag of Nuremberg

Flag of Nürnberger Land

Flag of Oberallgäu

Flag of Ostallgäu

Flag of Passau (Landkreis)

Flag of Passau (Stadtkreis)

Flag of Pfaffenhofen

Flag of Regen

Flag of Regensburg (Landkreis)

Flag of Regensburg (Stadtkreis)

Flag of Rhön-Grabfeld

Flag of Rosenheim (Landkreis)

Flag of Rosenheim (Stadtkreis)

Flag of Roth

Flag of Rottal-Inn

Flag of Schwabach

Flag of Schwandorf

Flag of Schweinfurt (Landkreis)

Flag of Schweinfurt (Stadtkreis)

Flag of Starnberg

Flag of Straubing

Flag of Straubing-Bogen

Flag of Tirschenreuth

Flag of Traunstein

Flag of Unterallgäu

Flag of Weiden in der Oberpfalz

Flag of Weilheim-Schongau

Flag of Weißenburg-Gunzenhausen

Flag of Wunsiedel

Flag of Würzburg (Landkreis)

Flag of Würzburg (Stadtkreis)

== Brandenburg ==
Flag of Barnim

Flag of Brandenburg an der Havel

Flag of Cottbus

Flag of Dahme-Spreewald

Flag of Elbe-Elster

Flag of Frankfurt (Oder)

Flag of Havelland

Flag of Märkisch-Oderland

Flag of Oberhavel

Flag of Oberspreewald-Lausitz

Flag of Oder-Spree

Flag of Ostprignitz-Ruppin

Flag of Potsdam

Flag of Potsdam-Mittelmark

Flag of Prignitz

Flag of Spree-Neiße

Flag of Teltow-Fläming

Flag of Uckermark

== Berlin ==
Flag	District	Date	Description
	Berlin	26 May 1954 –	Main article: Flag of Berlin A red-white-red flag with a black bear.

== Bremen ==
Flag	District	Date	Description
	Bremen	1952 –	Main article: Flag of Bremen The flag features eight equal horizontal stripes of red alternating with white and checked at the hoist.
	Bremen	1952 –	Variant with the coat of arms.
	Bremen	1952 –	Variant with the greater coat of arms.

== Hamburg ==
Flag	District	Date	Description
	Hamburg	1834 –	Main article: Flag of Hamburg A red flag with a white castle.

== Hesse ==
Flag of Bergstraße

Flag of Darmstadt

Flag of Darmstadt-Dieburg

Flag of Frankfurt

Flag of Fulda

Flag of Gießen

Flag of Groß-Gerau

Flag of Hersfeld-Rotenburg

Flag of Hochtaunuskreis

Flag of Kassel (Landkreis)

Flag of Kassel (Stadtkreis)

Flag of Lahn-Dill-Kreis

Flag of Limburg-Weilburg

Flag of Main-Kinzig-Kreis

Flag of Main-Taunus-Kreis

Flag of Marburg-Biedenkopf

Flag of Odenwaldkreis

Flag of Offenbach

Flag of Offenbach am Main

Flag of Rheingau-Taunus-Kreis

Flag of Schwalm-Eder-Kreis

Flag of Vogelsbergkreis

Flag of Waldeck-Frankenberg

Flag of Werra-Meißner-Kreis

Flag of Wetteraukreis

Flag of Wiesbaden

=== Historical ===
Flag of Biedenkopf (1959-1974)

Flag of Biedenkopf (1959-1974; variant)

Flag of Büdingen (1952-1972)

Flag of Büdingen (1952-1972; variant)

Flag of Darmstadt (1962-1976)

Flag of Darmstadt (1962-1976; variant)

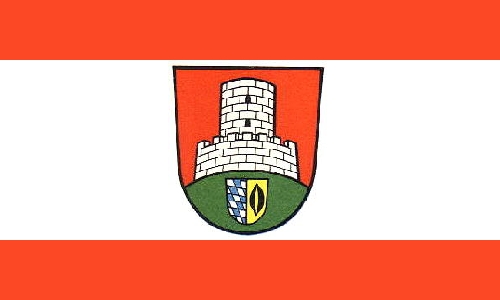
Flag of Dieburg (1961-1976)

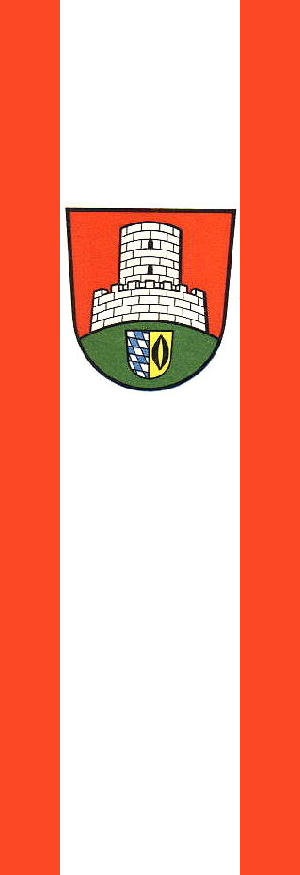
Flag of Dieburg (1961-1976; variant)

Flag of Lauterbach (1964-1974)

Flag of Lauterbach (1964-1974; variant)

Flag of Schlüchtern (1956-1974)

Flag of Schlüchtern (1956-1974; variant)

Flag of Waldeck (1955-1974)

Flag of Waldeck (1955-1974; variant)

== Lower Saxony ==
Flag of Ammerland

Flag of Aurich

Flag of the County of Bentheim

Flag of Braunschweig

Flag of Celle

Flag of Cloppenburg

Flag of Cuxhaven

Flag of Delmenhorst

Flag of Diepholz

Flag of Emden

Flag of Emsland

Flag of Friesland

Flag of Friesland (variant)

Flag of Gifhorn

Flag of Goslar

Flag of Göttingen

Flag of Göttingen (variant)

Flag of Hameln-Pyrmont

Flag of Hameln-Pyrmont (variant)

Flag of Region Hannover

Flag of Harburg

Flag of Heidekreis

Flag of Helmstedt

Flag of Hildesheim

Flag of Holzminden

Flag of Leer

Flag of Lüchow-Dannenberg

Flag of Lüneburg

Flag of Nienburg

Flag of Northeim

Flag of Oldenburg (Landkreis)

Flag of Oldenburg (Stadtkreis)

Flag of Osnabrück (Landkreis)

Flag of Osnabrück (Stadtkreis)

Flag of Osterholz

Flag of Peine

Flag of Rotenburg

Flag of Salzgitter

Flag of Schaumburg

Flag of Stade

Flag of Uelzen

Flag of Vechta

Flag of Verden

Flag of Wesermarsch

Flag of Wilhelmshaven

Flag of Wittmund

Flag of Wolfenbüttel

Flag of Wolfsburg

=== Historical ===
Flag of Göttingen (1973–2017)

Flag of Göttingen (1973–2017; variant)

== Mecklenburg-Vorpommern ==
Flag	District	Date	Description
	Ludwigslust-Parchim	27 January 2015 –	Banner of arms. The grey heron on blue represents nature, water and biodiversity, the crowned bull's head on yellow represents both Mecklenburg and Parchim and the branch of a oak tree represents Ludwigslust. Designed by Heinz Kippnick.
	Mecklenburgische Seenplatte	11 March 2014 –	Blue and yellow flag with the coat of arms. The red griffin represents the Duchy of Pomerania while the bull's head represents Werle. The blue and white waves represents the bodies of water. The total number of waves represent Altentreptow, Demmin, Neubrandenburg, Neustrelitz, Malchin, Waren and Röbel. Designed by Heinz Kippnick.
	Nordwestmecklenburg	15 February 2012 –	Banner of arms. The bull's head on yellow represents the Duchy of Mecklenburg-Schwerin while the crosier on the red and white stripes represents . Red and white were the colours of the Hanseatic League. Designed by Manfred Gerth.
	Rostock (Landkreis)	15 November 2011 –	Banner of arms. The bull's head on yellow represents Lordship of Werle and the griffin's head represents the Lordship of Rostock. Two crossed crosiers symbolizes Doberan Abbey. Designed by Manfred Gerth.
	Rostock (Stadtkreis)	3 July 1991 –	Banner of arms. The yellow griffin represents the Lordship of Rostock. Blue, white and red are traditional colours of Mecklenburg-Vorpommern. White and red are colours of the Hanseatic League.
	Schwerin	1994 –	Yellow-blue-yellow flag with a knight in the middle blue stripe. The knight is a depiction of Henry the Lion.
	Vorpommern-Greifswald	21 June 2022 –	
	Vorpommern-Rügen	10 October 2013 –	Blue and yellow horizontal flag with the coat of arms.

=== Historical ===
Flag	District	Date	Description
	Bad Doberan	1 August 1996 – 4 September 2011	Yellow and blue horizontal flag. The yellow griffin represents Rostock, the bull's head represents the Werle and the crosier represents the Cistercians.
	Demmin	26 March 1996 – 4 September 2011	Flag with seven blue, yellow and red stripes.
	Mueritz	1995 – 4 September 2011	
	Ostvorpommern	1998 – 4 September 2011	
	Parchim	1995 – 4 September 2011	
	Nordwestmecklenburg	2006 – 4 September 2011	

== North Rhine-Westphalia ==
Flag of Aachen

Flag of Bielefeld

Flag of Bielefeld (variant)

Flag of Bochum

Flag of Bochum (variant)

Flag of Bonn

Flag of Borken

Flag of Borken (variant)

Flag of Bottrop

Flag of Bottrop (variant)

Flag of Coesfeld

Flag of Coesfeld (variant)

Flag of Cologne

Flag of Cologne (variant)

Flag of Dortmund

Flag of Dortmund (variant)

Flag of Duisburg

Flag of Duisburg (variant)

Flag of Düren

Flag of Düsseldorf

Flag of Düsseldorf (variant)

Flag of Ennepe-Ruhr-Kreis

Flag of Ennepe-Ruhr-Kreis (variant 1)

Flag of Ennepe-Ruhr-Kreis (variant 2)

Flag of Essen

Flag of Essen (variant)

Flag of Euskirchen

Flag of Euskirchen (variant)

Flag of Gelsenkirchen

Flag of Gütersloh

Flag of Gütersloh (variant)

Flag of Hagen

Flag of Hamm

Flag of Hamm (variant)

Flag of Heinsberg

Flag of Heinsberg (variant)

Flag of Herford

Flag of Herford (variant)

Flag of Herne

Flag of Hochsauerlandkreis

Flag of Hochsauerlandkreis (variant)

Flag of Höxter

Flag of Höxter (variant)

Flag of Kleve

Flag of Kleve (variant)

Flag of Krefeld

Flag of Krefeld (variant)

Flag of Leverkusen

Flag of Leverkusen (variant)

Flag of Lippe

Flag of Lippe (variant)

Flag of Märkischer Kreis

Flag of Mettmann

Flag of Minden-Lübbecke

Flag of Minden-Lübbecke (variant)

Flag of Mönchengladbach

Flag of Mönchengladbach (variant)

Flag of Mülheim

Flag of Mülheim (variant)

Flag of Münster

Flag of Münster (variant 1)

Flag of Münster (variant 2)

Flag of Oberbergischer Kreis

Flag of Oberbergischer Kreis (variant)

Flag of Oberhausen

Flag of Oberhausen (variant)

Flag of Olpe

Flag of Olpe (variant)

Flag of Paderborn

Flag of Recklinghausen

Flag of Recklinghausen (variant)

Flag of Remscheid

Flag of Remscheid (variant)

Flag of Rhein-Erft-Kreis

Flag of Rheinisch-Bergischer Kreis

Flag of Rhein-Kreis Neuss

Flag of Rhein-Kreis Neuss

Flag of Rhein-Sieg-Kreis

Flag of Siegen-Wittgenstein

Flag of Siegen-Wittgenstein (variant)

Flag of Soest

Flag of Soest (variant)

Flag of Solingen

Flag of Solingen (variant)

Flag of Steinfurt

Flag of Unna

Flag of Viersen

Flag of Viersen (variant)

Flag of Warendorf

Flag of Warendorf (variant)

Flag of Wesel

Flag of Wesel (variant)

Flag of Wuppertal

Flag of Wuppertal (variant)

=== Historical ===
Flag of Brilon (1957-1976)

Flag of Tecklenburg (1934-1975)

Flag of Tecklenburg (1934-1975; variant)

== Rhineland-Palatinate ==
Flag of Ahrweiler

Flag of Altenkirchen

Flag of Alzey-Worms

Flag of Bad Dürkheim

Flag of Bad Kreuznach

Flag of Bad Kreuznach (variant)

Flag of Bernkastel-Wittlich

Flag of Birkenfeld

Flag of Bitburg-Pruem

Flag of Cochem-Zell

Flag of Donnersbergkreis

Flag of Frankenthal

Flag of Germersheim

Flag of Kaiserslautern (Stadtkreis)

Flag of Kaiserslautern (Landkreis)

Flag of Koblenz

Flag of Kusel

Flag of Landau

Flag of Ludwigshafen

Flag of Mainz-Bingen

Flag of Mainz

Flag of Mayen-Koblenz

Flag of Neustadt an der Weinstraße

Flag of Neuwied

Flag of Pirmasens

Flag of Rhein-Hunsrück-Kreis

Flag of Rhein-Lahn-Kreis

Flag of Rhein-Pfalz-Kreis

Flag of Speyer

Flag of Südliche Weinstraße

Flag of Südwestpfalz

Flag of Trier

Flag of Trier-Saarburg

Flag of Vulkaneifel

Flag of Westerwaldkreis

Flag of Worms

Flag of Zweibrücken

== Saarland ==
Flag	Districf	Date	Description
	Merzig-Wadern	1 February 1966 –	A red and yellow bicoloured flag with the coat of arms.
	Neunkirchen	22 August 1961 –	A blue and white bicoloured flag with the coat of arms.
	Saarbrücken	17 March 1975 –	A blue and yellow bicoloured flag with the coat of arms.
	Saarlouis	1 February 1966 –	A black-red-yellow tricoloured flag with the coat of arms.
	Saarpfalz-Kreis	21 May 1975 –	A white and blue bicoloured flag with the coat of arms.
	Sankt Wendel	25 February 1965 –	A red and yellow bicoloured flag with the coat of arms.

== Saxony ==
Flag	Districf	Date	Description
	Bautzen	2000 –	A blue-yellow flag with the coat of arms.
	Chemnitz	1475 –	A blue-yellow flag. The colours are from the Margraviate of Landsberg.
	Dresden	1994 –	A black-yellow flag with the coat of arms.
	Erzgebirgskreis	18 December 2008 –	A green-white flag with the coat of arms.
	Görlitz	21 April 2009 –	A yellow-blue flag with the coat of arms.
	Leipzig (Landkreis)	30 October 2009 (de facto) –	A white flag with the coat of arms. The blue and white wavy lines represents the Neuseenland, the yellow castle represents the Gnandstein Castle and the white gullet and three flowers represent Muldentalkreis.
	Leipzig (Stadtkreis)	1475 –	A blue-yellow flag with the coat of arms. The coat of arms consists of the Meissen lion on the left (representing the House of Wettin) and blue and yellow striped Landsberger Pfähle (representing the Margraviate of Landsberg).
	Meissen	27 April 2009 –	A yellow flag with the coat of arms in the centre with two red lines on left and right.
	Mittelsachsen	27 April 2009 –	A black-yellow with the coat of arms.
	Nordsachsen	10 December 2008 –	A yellow-blue-yellow with the coat of arms.
	Vogtlandkreis	31 March 1996 –	A yellow-black with the coat of arms.
	Sächsische Schweiz-Osterzgebirge	13 November 2008 –	A white flag with the coat of arms.
	Zwickau	4 December 2009 –	A red-white with the coat of arms.

== Saxony-Anhalt ==
Flag of Altmarkkreis Salzwedel

Flag of Anhalt-Bitterfeld

Flag of Börde

Flag of Burgenlandkreis

Flag of Dessau-Roßlau

Flag of Halle (Saale)

Flag of Harz

Flag of Jerichower Land

Flag of Magdeburg

Flag of Mansfeld-Südharz

Flag of Saalekreis

Flag of Salzlandkreis

Flag of Stendal

Flag of Wittenberg

== Schleswig-Holstein ==
Flag	City	Date	Description
	Dithmarschen	17 May 1972 –	A white flag with 7 red and white stripes and the coat of arms. The coat of arms features a knight in gold armor riding a white horse. It represents its readiness for warfare. Designed by Wilhelm Horst Lippert.
	Flensburg	30 June 1938 –	A blue flag with the coat of arms. The two blue lions represents the Duchy of Schleswig, the silver nettle leaf in the red shield represents the Duchy of Holstein. The red tower represents the defense of the city. The waves represents the city's connection to the North Sea. Designed by Johannes Holtz, Max Kirmis, Erwin Nöbbe and Heinrich Sauermann.
	Flensburg	30 June 1938 –	Vertical variant.
	Herzogtum Lauenburg	1948 –	A flag with two black stripes and the coat of arms. The coat of arms features a horse head represents Kingdom of Hanover and Denmark. The colours are from Prussia.
	Kiel	1921 –	A red flag based on the County of Schaumburg with a black boat representing the city's importance as a port inside a nesselblatt.
	Kiel	1921 –	Vertical variant.
	Lübeck	22 January 1941 –	White-red bicolor with a black eagle the Lübeck double eagle.
	Lübeck	22 January 1941 –	Vertical variant.
	Nordfriesland	10 July 1972 –	Five horizontal bands of blue, yellow, and red (double width), with three ships to the left. The ships represents Eiderstedt, Everschop and Utholm. The sails of the ships contain a plough (representing Husum), a fish (representing Westerland as it is close to the sea) and a ox's head (representing Eiderstedt as it is known for its livestock). The colors were traditional colors of North Frisia. Designed by Wilhelm Horst Lippert.
	Neumünster	13 March 1930 –	White-red bicolor with the coat of arms. The coat of arms consists of a swan (representing Stormarn), a nesselblatt (representing Holstein) and five chimeys representing Neumünster. The coat of arms represents the present and the past. Red and white are the colours of Holstein.
	Neumünster	13 March 1930 –	Vertical variant.
	Ostholstein	30 July 1971 –	A red-white-red horizontal flag with the coat of arms. The coat of arms contains a castle represents Oldenburg while the mitre and the cross represents Eutin (which used to be part of the Prince-bishopric of Lübeck).
	Pinneberg	12 May 1986 –	A blue-white-red horizontal flag with the coat of arms. The coat of arms features a nasselblatt represents the counts of Schauenburg and Holstein. The fir tree symbolizes the location of one of the largest nurseries in Germany. Designed by Paul Weber.
	Plön	12 May 1975 –	A blue-white-red (which are the colours of Schleswig-Holstein) horizontal flag with the coat of arms. The coat of arms features a nasselblatt represents the counts of Schauenburg and Holstein. The oak leaf represents forests. The ear of grain represents agriculture. The fish represents the district's 80 lakes and the Baltic Sea.
	Rendsburg-Eckernförde	29 January 1981 –	A red and yellow diagonal flag with a two blue lions and the yellow triangle (representing Eckernförde and Schleswig) and a nasselblatt on the red triangle (representing Rendsburg and the municipalities that were transferred from Plön and Holstein). The wavy pattern represents the Baltic Sea, the Eider river and the Kiel Canal. Designed by Wilhelm Horst Lippert.
	Schleswig-Flensburg	3 October 1977 –	A blue and yellow horizontal flag with a two lions (a blue lion and a yellow lion). The colours were the traditional colours of Schleswig. Designed by Heinz Reinhold.
	Segeberg	25 November 1977 –	A red-white-red flag with a cross. The cross represents the introduction of Christianity to Wagria by Vicelinus. The cross is composed of four brick towers representing the churches that Vicelinus built, four leaves of a water lily representing the von Segeberg family and a nasselblatt represents the counts of Schauenburg and Holstein. Designed by George Fink.
	Steinburg	20 July 1957 –	A blue-white-blue flag with the coat of arms. The coat of arms consists of a castle with three coats of arms (representing Wilstermarsch, Holstein and Krempermarsch respectively). Wilstermarsch is represented by an image of Christ the King, Holstein by a nasselblatt and Krempermarsch by a white swan. The three coats of arms are placed on a castle surrounded by a moat. Designed by Max Kahlke.
	Stormarn	31 July 1981 –	A red flag with a white swan wearing a crown on its neck. The swan represents its readiness for war.

=== Historical ===
Flag	City	Date	Description
	Süderdithmarschen	1 January 1963 – 25 April 1970	A white flag with 7 red and white stripes and a knight. The knight in white armor riding a white horse. It represents its readiness for warfare. Designed by Wilhelm Horst Lippert.

== Thuringia ==
Flag	District	Date	Description
	Altenburger Land	3 June 1996 –	A red-white-green horizontal tricolour flag with the coat of arms. The rose symbolizes Altenburg, a reborn world and the future. The lion represents the Margravate of Meissen. The yellow and white lion represents Pleissnerland. The nine black and yellow stripes with a green crown represents the House of Wettin. The acorn alludes to the district's status as the birthplace of game of Skat.
	Altenburger Land	3 June 1996 –	Vertical variant.
	Eichsfeld	22 March 1995 –	A white-red horizontal bicolour flag with the coat of arms. The eagle alludes to the coat of arms of Frederick William I of Prussia while the wheel represents the Elector of Mainz.
	Eichsfeld	22 March 1995 –	Vertical variant.
	Eisenach	2000 –	A blue-white-blue flag with a red cross.
	Eisenach	2000 –	Vertical variant.
	Erfurt	5 December 1994 –	A red-white-red flag with a white wheel.
	Erfurt	5 December 1994 –	Vertical variant.
	Gera	2000 –	A black and yellow flag.
	Gera	2000 –	Vertical variant.
	Gotha	28 June 1991 –	A white-red horizontal bicolour flag with the coat of arms.
	Gotha	28 June 1991 –	Vertical variant.
	Greiz	16 June 1997 –	A yellow-green-yellow flag with the coat of arms.
	Greiz	16 June 1997 –	Vertical variant.
	Hildburghausen	16 May 1996 –	A white-red horizontal bicolour flag with the coat of arms.
	Hildburghausen	16 May 1996 –	Vertical variant.

Flag of Ilm-Kreis

Flag of Ilm-Kreis (variant)

Flag of Jena

Flag of Jena (variant)

Flag of Kyffhäuserkreis

Flag of Kyffhäuserkreis (variant)

Flag of Nordhausen

Flag of Nordhausen (variant)

Flag of Saale-Holzland-Kreis

Flag of Saale-Holzland-Kreis (variant)

Flag of Saale-Orla-Kreis

Flag of Saale-Orla-Kreis (variant)

Flag of Saalfeld-Rudolstadt

Flag of Saalfeld-Rudolstadt (variant)

Flag of Schmalkalden-Meiningen

Flag of Schmalkalden-Meiningen (variant)

Flag of Sonneberg

Flag of Sonneberg (variant)

Flag of Sömmerda

Flag of Sömmerda (variant)

Flag of Suhl

Flag of Suhl (variant)

Flag of Unstrut-Hainich-Kreis

Flag of Unstrut-Hainich-Kreis (variant)

Flag of Wartburgkreis

Flag of Wartburgkreis (variant)

Flag of Weimar

Flag of Weimar(variant)

Flag of Weimarer Land

Flag of Weimarer Land (variant)
