= Flag of Rhineland-Palatinate =

Rhineland-Palatinate
- Civil and State flag (Landes- und Landesdienstflagge)
- Use: Civil and state flag
- Proportion: 2:3
- Adopted: 10 May 1948

The flag of Rhineland-Palatinate, also known as Rhineland-Pfalz, is a tricolor of three horizontal bands of black, red and gold. These colors are Germany's national colors and are sometimes referred to as schwarz-rot-gold. In the canton, or the upper left corner, is the coat of arms of the state of Rhineland-Palatinate.

== See also ==
- Flags of German states
