= Flag of Saxony-Anhalt =

Saxony-Anhalt
- Landesflagge
- Use: Civil and state flag
- Proportion: 3:5
- Adopted: 30 January 1991 (Changed in 2017 to avoid confusion with Baden-Württemberg)

The flag of Saxony-Anhalt is a yellow and black bi-color, with the state's coat of arms centered on the flag.

== History ==
Black and yellow were the colors of the Prussian Province of Saxony and the pre-1952 State of Saxony-Anhalt, but on 29 January 1991 the traditional order of the colors was reversed to distinguish the flag from the black-over-yellow bi-color of Baden-Württemberg. This was then enshrined in the state constitution of 17 July 1992, where Article 1 deals with the state symbols.

From 1991 to 2017, the flag had two major variants: a plain bi-color as the civil flag and the current flag as the state flag.

Anhalt-Bernburg (1252–1468, 1603–1863)

Duchy of Anhalt (1806–1918)

Former civil flag of Saxony-Anhalt until 5 April 2017.

== See also ==
- Flags of German states
