= 1951 Baden-Württemberg referendum =

1951 referendum held in South Baden, Württemberg-Baden and Württemberg-Hohenzollern

1951 Baden-Württemberg referendum and merge
- December 9, 1951

Results
Choice	Votes	%
For merger	1,748,136	69.74%
For restoring the old states	758,518	30.26%
Valid votes	2,506,654	98.68%
Invalid or blank votes	33,645	1.32%
Total votes	2,540,299	100.00%
Registered voters/turnout	4,287,797	59.24%
- Red indicates districts with a majority in favour of the merger, while Blue indicates districts with a majority in favour of restoring the old states.

A referendum was held on 9 December 1951 in the states of South Baden, Württemberg-Baden, and Württemberg-Hohenzollern. Voters were asked whether they favoured a merger of the three states into a single state or the re-establishment of the old states of Baden and Württemberg. With 69.7 percent of the vote, voters favoured unification with a turnout of 59.2 percent.

For either option to succeed, a majority in three or more of the four voting areas was required. As a majority in North Baden, North Württemberg, and South Württemberg supported the merger, while only South Baden supported the re-establishment of the old states, the merger was considered victorious. As a result, the state of Baden-Württemberg was founded on 25 April 1952.

== Background ==
After the end of the Napoleonic Wars, the region that today forms Baden-Württemberg was divided into three entities: the Kingdom of Württemberg, the Grand Duchy of Baden, and the two Hohenzollern principalities, which were merged in 1850 into the Prussian Province of Hohenzollern. Württemberg and Baden were successively integrated as federal states of the German Empire in 1871 and the Weimar Republic in 1919, becoming the Free People's State of Württemberg and Republic of Baden respectively. Hohenzollern remained a province of the Free State of Prussia. After the federal structure of Germany was de facto abolished during the Nazi Gleichschaltung, Württemberg and Hohenzollern were merged into the Gau of Württemberg-Hohenzollern, while Baden became its own Gau.

Toward the end of the Second World War, urban centres in northern Baden and Württemberg were subject to bombing raids; over half of Stuttgart was destroyed by Allied bombers. However, southern Württemberg and Hohenzollern were largely spared from destruction due to their rural character. On 31 March 1945, the first Allied ground forces reached Baden when the French First Army under Jean de Lattre de Tassigny crossed the Rhine at Speyer and Germersheim, reaching Karlsruhe on 4 April. Additional French forces crossed the Rhine at Kehl on 16 April and advanced from the south through Tübingen. American forces entered Württemberg from the northeast, and advanced along the Neckar towards Stuttgart. Although both army groups reached Stuttgart almost simultaneously, the French occupied the city on 21 April.

=== American and French occupation ===
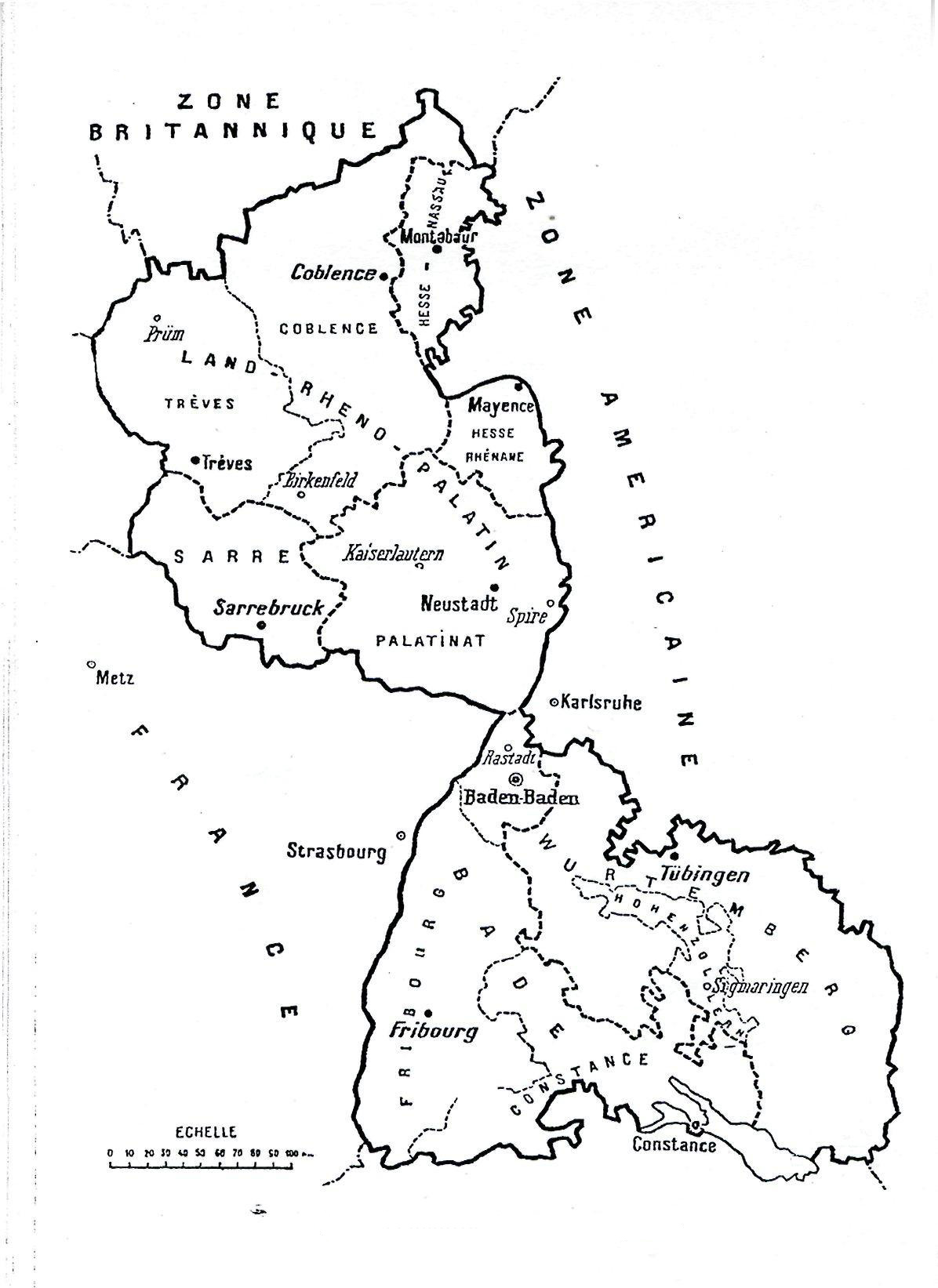
The French occupation zone in 1945–46

While France was not granted an occupation zone at the Yalta Conference in February 1945, Charles de Gaulle later successfully convinced the Allied leaders to allocate an area for French occupation. This comprised territory that had previously been part of the British and American zones. The French acquired the Saarland, the Palatinate, and territories on the left bank of the Rhine up to Remagen from the British zone, while the Americans ceded Baden south of Baden-Baden, some districts in the south of Württemberg, the Lindau district in Bavaria, and four districts in Hesse east of the Rhine. The border between the American and French occupation zones in Baden and Württemberg was based on a map drawn by Dwight D. Eisenhower on 3 May. He recommended that, due to the transport links of the region, the districts of Karlsruhe and Mannheim, as well as the area around the Karlsruhe-Stuttgart-Ulm highway (today the A 8), be assigned to the U.S. zone. Anything south of these regions would fall under French occupation, including large parts of Württemberg and the entirety of the old Province of Hohenzollern. The French government demanded all of Baden, but the American authorities refused to grant further concessions, and the French agreed to Eisenhower's proposal on 29 June. French forces left Stuttgart on 8 July, and the final agreement concerning the occupation zones was signed by the four powers on 26 July.

Administration within the American zone developed quickly, with the different regions being organised into states by September. The parts of Baden and Württemberg under American occupation were united as Württemberg-Baden, and liberal politician Reinhold Maier was appointed Minister-President. At the time, the state covered 15,700 square kilometres and had a population of over 3.5 million. A constituent assembly was elected on 30 June 1946, and a constitution was approved by referendum on 24 November. Simultaneously, the first elections to the state legislature, the Landtag, were held. The Christian Democratic Union (CDU) was the largest party with 39 seats, followed by the Social Democratic Party (SPD) with 32, the Democratic People's Party (DVP) with 19, and the Communist Party (KPD) with 10. The CDU, SPD, and DVP subsequently formed a government together, and though Reinhold Maier's DVP was only the third largest party, he was chosen to continue as Minister-President. Within the new state, the regions of Baden and Württemberg were administered as "state districts" (Landesbezirke).

By contrast, French administration evolved slowly. Initially, the scope of administration in the French zone was limited to districts, which operated independently of one another. In October 1945, French authorities formed provisional governments for two separate regions: one covering Hohenzollern and the parts of Württemberg that fell within French zone, and the other covering the French-occupied parts of Baden. The new Baden zone, with its capital in Freiburg im Breisgau, covered 9,646 square kilometres and was home to 1.3 million people. The new Württemberg-Hohenzollern zone was slightly larger, but less populous and more rural. Article 1 of the Statute of the State Secretariat for Württemberg-Hohenzollern stipulated that it "exercises state power for the state government in the French-occupied area of Württemberg while the state government of Württemberg is dormant." In preparation for the drafting of the two states' constitutions, constituent assemblies were elected on 17 November 1946 by members of the local and district assemblies. The CDU dominated in both states, winning a majority of seats, while the SPD came second. In Württemberg-Hohenzollern, attempts by legislators to include references to Württemberg-Hohenzollern as part of Württemberg, and the restoration of Württemberg as a state goal, were rejected by French authorities. However, both the CDU and SPD agreed that the new state was only a temporary solution. The constitution was adopted by the State Assembly on 22 April 1947 with the support of the CDU and SPD. In Baden, the constitution was approved with the inclusion of a preamble which declared the new state to be the successor of the old Baden. Though it was often referred to as South Baden (Südbaden), the state's official name was simply Baden.

Both states' constitutions were ratified by referendum on 18 May. Held simultaneously were the first and only elections to the state Landtags. The CDU won an absolute majority in both. In Württemberg-Hohenzollern, they formed a coalition government with the SPD and DVP, while in Baden, they formed a coalition with the SPD. On 8 July, Lorenz Bock was elected as State-President (Staatspräsidant) of Württemberg-Hohenzollern. In Baden, Leo Wohleb, who had previously headed the provisional government, was elected as State-President.

=== Federal Republic of Germany ===
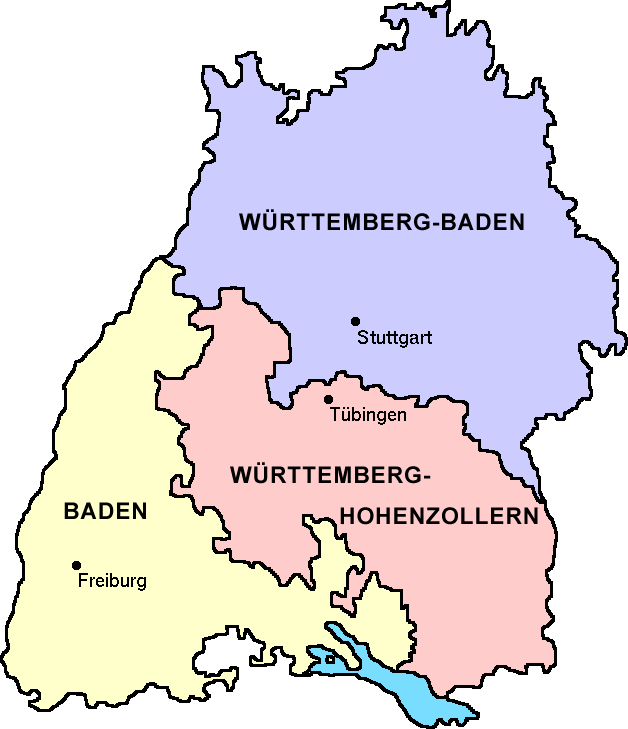
The three southwestern states within the Federal Republic of Germany

A conference between the four Allied powers was held in London between 25 November and 15 December 1947 to discuss the creation of an all-German administration. However, talks failed due to the conditions imposed by the Soviet Union and the differing ideas of France. A follow-up conference between the three western powers was then held to determine a common occupation policy. As a result, on 1 July 1948, the eleven state heads of government in the western occupation zones received the Frankfurt Documents, which contained recommendations for the establishment of a united western German state. A series of conferences were held throughout late 1948, culminating in the convening of the Parlamentarischer Rat to draft the new constitution, which became known as the Basic Law. It deliberated from 1 September 1948 until May 1949. Upon the foundation of the Federal Republic of Germany on 23 May 1949, Baden, Württemberg-Baden, and Württemberg-Hohenzollern were admitted as states.

In the Frankfurt Documents, the Western allies asked the state heads of governments for proposals for state border changes. There were no proposals for any changes outside of southwestern Germany. The question of border changes was postponed until after the foundation of the Federal Republic, however, because the representatives of the three states could not agree on what course of action to take. The government of Württemberg-Hohenzollern proposed the unification of all three states, which State-President Wohleb from Baden categorically rejected. He instead proposed the restoration of the old state of Baden, as espoused by the constitution of his state. However, the American military government opposed the division of Württemberg-Baden. North Baden politicians, fearing that unification with southern Baden would mean expansion of the harsh French reparations policy into the north, also opposed it.

Article 29 Paragraph 1 of the Basic Law contained a mandate for reorganisation of the federal states: "to ensure that the states can effectively and efficiently perform the tasks incumbent on them." However, reorganization was subject to high requirements. It was only possible if the population in all affected areas voted with a majority in favour of the reorganization. If the reorganisation was rejected, a federal referendum was required. However, shortly before the deliberations of the Parlamentarischer Rat concluded, another article, Article 118, was inserted into the Basic Law on the initiative of Württemberg-Hohenzollern. This article stated: "The reorganization in the areas comprising the states of Baden, Württemberg-Baden and Württemberg-Hohenzollern can deviate from the provisions of Art. 29 GG by agreement of the participating states. If an agreement is not reached, the reorganization is regulated by federal law, which must provide for a referendum." The commanders-in-chief of the western Allies put restrictions on Articles 29 and 118, suspending the reorganization of federal territory under Article 29 until a peace treaty was signed. However, the wording of the reservation was unclear; it neither explicitly referred to only Article 29, nor to both articles. Due to this lack of clarity, the representatives of France in Germany questioned the legality of a merger of the three states. However, Robert Schuman had already stated to State-President of Württemberg-Hohenzollern Gebhard Müller on 19 February 1949 that France would not prevent it.

== Referendums ==
=== Proposals ===
Proposed voting areas. Left: the proposal of the Württemberg-Baden government. Right: Leo Wohleb's proposal.

On 24 August 1949, Leo Wohleb submitted the first draft of a proposed agreement between Baden and the states of Württemberg-Baden and Württemberg-Hohenzollern, conducted under Article 118. He suggested that the states be divided into three voting districts for the merger referendum: all of Baden, all of Württemberg, and Hohenzollern. He suggested that two questions should be asked: whether the three states should merge, and whether the old states of Baden and Württemberg should be restored. According to Wohleb's proposal, the restoration of the old states should occur even if the proposal received majority support in only one of either Baden or Württemberg, but not the other. After negotiations, Württemberg-Hohenzollern agreed. On 22 October, the executive of all three southwestern state CDU branches met and agreed to support Wohleb's proposal. While this effectively secured its passage in Baden and Württemberg-Hohenzollern, where the CDU held majorities, the CDU did not have a majority in the Württemberg-Baden state Landtag.

The Württemberg-Baden state government, led by the DVP's Reinhold Maier, rejected Wohleb's plan. Instead, they proposed that the states be split into four voting areas: North Württemberg (comprising the Württemberg region of Württemberg-Baden), South Württemberg (comprising Württemberg-Hohenzollern), North Baden (comprising the Baden region of Württemberg-Baden), and South Baden (comprising the state of Baden). They suggested that if the question of the state merger achieved a majority in three or more of these voting areas, it should proceed. Wohleb, in turn, rejected this plan.

=== 1950 trial referendum ===
A meeting was held in Freudenstadt on 15 April 1950, but when it became clear that the leaders could not agree on either of the two proposals, Württemberg-Hohenzollern State-President Müller floated a third option formulated by state minister Theodor Eschenburg. This provided for a purely informative trial referendum (Probeabstimmung) using the four voting areas proposed by Württemberg-Baden, but asking both questions proposed by Wohleb. The result of this trial referendum would provide a stable basis for the governments' policies for a final, binding referendum. This proposal also stated that if no agreement could be reached within two months of the trial referendum, the unification would be considered failed. Referencing Article 118, Eschenburg stated that if the issue could not be resolved between the states, responsibility could be shifted to the federal legislature, the Bundestag. All three states agreed to Eschenburg's proposal. The trial referendum took place on 24 September 1950, and the results were as follows:

Voting area	Merger	Restoration	Turnout
North Württemberg	93.5%	6.5%	42.9%
South Württemberg	92.5%	7.5%	48.8%
Württemberg total	93.0%	7.0%	
North Baden	57.4%	42.6%	60.4%
South Baden	40.4%	59.6%	65.2%
Baden total	48.9%	51.1%	

Wohleb felt the result affirmed his plan, as a majority of both southern Baden and Baden overall voted for the restoration of the old states. However, the government of Württemberg-Baden also felt that the result affirmed their plan, as three of the four voting areas voted in favour of the merger. Gebhard Müller, for his part, believed the result showed clear support for the merger. At a meeting of the heads of government in Bad Wildbad on 12 October, no agreement could be reached for a next step. Another conference in Baden-Baden on 7 November was likewise inconclusive. Two months after the trial referendum on 28 November, Müller informed the Bundestag that, in accordance with the Freudenstadt agreement of 15 April, negotiations for reorganisation had failed. This cleared the way for the federal legislature to take responsibility for the reorganisation, as specified by Article 118 of the Basic Law. Müller gave up his role as mediator between the two other states when, in a cabinet meeting on 18 December, he voiced his support for Württemberg-Baden's referendum plan.

=== Bundestag deliberations ===
Two bills concerning the "Southwest state question" (Südweststaatsfrage) were introduced to the Bundestag in January 1951. Anton Hilbert, a CDU deputy for Baden, introduced a draft on 9 January similar to Leo Wohleb's original proposal. It likewise suggested that voters choose between merger or restoration of the old states, and that only one voting area need vote for restoration for it to go ahead; however, the Hilbert draft proposed only two voting areas: all of Baden and all of Württemberg plus Hohenzollern. The second bill, submitted on 26 January, was known as the Gengler-Kiesinger draft. It was prepared by the State Chancelery of Württemberg-Hohenzollern, and named for two CDU politicians: state Landtag president Karl Gengler, and Bundestag deputy for Württemberg-Hohenzollern Kurt Georg Kiesinger, who later served as Minister-President of Baden-Württemberg and then Chancellor of Germany. Conversely, the Gengler-Kiesinger draft was similar to the Württemberg-Baden plan as backed by Müller; it retained the four voting areas of the trial referendum, and asked voters if they supported or opposed the merger of the three states, without asking about the restoration of the old states. If a majority in three or more voting areas were in favour, the referendum would be considered successful.

While the bills were debated in the Bundestag, the debate in Baden was becoming increasingly emotional. The people of Württemberg-Hohenzollern, as indicated by the low turnout for the trial referendum, were largely apathetic about the subject. In the Bundestag, the SPD and Free Democratic Party (FDP) factions almost unanimously supported the merger of the southwestern states. By contrast, the vast majority of the CDU/CSU supported Baden's case. The CDU's Bundestag deputies from Württemberg-Hohenzollern and Württemberg-Baden, all of whom supported the merger, were isolated from the rest of their faction. CDU Chancellor Konrad Adenauer also opposed the merger in principle. A major argument within the CDU was that the merger threatened the CDU's majority in the Bundesrat, the upper house of the federal legislature. The southwest states together had ten seats in the Bundesrat, six of which were held by the CDU. If the merger went ahead, the united state would only have five seats, and there was no guarantee that the CDU would hold them after the next election. Adenauer was dependent on the CDU/CSU's majority in the Bundesrat to ratify foreign policy treaties in order to implement his policy of western integration.

The Committee for Intra-Regional Reorganization debated the formation of the southwestern state in accordance with the Gengler-Kiesinger draft. A draft law, very similar to the Gengler-Kiesinger draft, was approved by the committee on 16 March with nine votes in favour to five against. A day earlier, the Bundestag had passed the so-called First Reorganisation Act, which extended the legislative periods of the Landtags of Baden and Württemberg-Hohenzollern by an additional year, until 31 March 1952. On 25 April, the Second Reorganisation Act, based on the Gengler-Kiesinger draft, was passed by the Bundestag with a majority of around 60 votes. During debate over the bill, State-President Wohleb concluded his speech with the words "Baden is not yet lost!" It was approved by the Bundesrat on 27 April, and came into effect on 4 May after being signed by President Theodor Heuss.

=== First legal challenge ===
The state of Baden submitted an application to the Federal Constitutional Court challenging both Reorganisation Acts, arguing that the extension of state legislative terms was illegal and that the referendum planned by the Second act was illegal on the basis that Baden could not vote as a united state. The Court handed down its ruling on 23 October 1951, declaring that the extension of the state legislative period was indeed unconstitutional; thus, the First Reorganisation Act was null and void. The verdict on the Second Reorganisation Act, however, was tied six votes to six. Thus, the application failed. The Bundestag subsequently amended the Basic Law to allow the extension of the state legislative terms. The referendum went ahead as planned, and took place on 9 December 1951.

== Results ==
Choice	Votes	%
For merger	1,748,136	69.74
For restoring the old states	758,518	30.26
Invalid/blank votes	33,645	–
Total	2,540,299	100.00
Registered voters/turnout	4,287,797	59.24

=== Results by voting area ===
Voting area	Merger		Restoration		Turnout
Voting area	Votes	%	Votes	%	Turnout
North Württemberg	769,553	93.52	53,328	6.48	51.12
South Württemberg	363,321	91.40	34,181	8.60	52.30
Württemberg total	1,132,874	92.83	87,509	7.17	51.50
North Baden	382,017	57.05	287,569	42.95	68.03
South Baden	233,245	37.82	383,440	62.18	70.46
Baden total	615,262	47.83	671,009	52.17	69.17

== Outcome ==
The referendum received a strong majority across the region as well as majorities in three of the four voting areas. Therefore, it was considered a success, and the merger of the three states proceeded. A constituent assembly was elected on 9 March 1952 and passed a constitution for the new state, provisionally named Baden-Württemberg. It formally came into existence at 12:30 PM on 25 April 1952. Though the name Baden-Württemberg was not intended to be permanent, no alternative could be agreed upon, and thus it was retained.

Reinhold Maier became Baden-Württemberg's first Minister-President, forming government with the SPD and GB/BHE after the constituent assembly election. He resigned after the CDU won an absolute majority of votes in Baden-Württemberg in the 1953 federal election, and Gebhard Müller formed a new government.

=== Second legal challenge and 1970 referendum ===
After the 1951 referendum and the formation of Baden-Württemberg, Paul Zürcher, former advisor to State-President Wohleb, formed the Heimatbund Badener Land (Homeland Union for the State of Baden) to advocate for the establishment of a united Baden as an independent state in the Federal Republic. In 1956, he submitted an application to the Federal Constitutional Court challenging the legality of the Second Reorganisation Act on the grounds of Article 29 of the Basic Law. Article 29 states that, in areas that were transferred to new states without public approval, a referendum on the territorial status of the area can be called via a petition supported by 10% of registered voters. Further, the Article states that any federal law regulating reorganisation of territory must include provisions to allow such a referendum to be requested by public petition. Since northern Baden had been transferred from the old state of Baden to Württemberg-Baden without public approval, the Second Reorganisation Act should have included a provision to allow public petition on the issue. However, the Act contained no such provision; likewise, the 1951 referendum was held separately in the voting areas of North Baden and South Baden, and therefore did not count as a referendum on Baden's territorial status. The Federal Constitutional Court thus ruled on 30 May 1956 that the citizens of Baden may petition for a referendum on Baden's territorial status. However, due to further constitutional complications, an amendment to the Basic Law was required to allow the referendum to take place. This only took place in 1969, with the addition of an eighth clause to Article 29: "Länder may revise the division of their existing territory or parts of their territory by agreement without regard to the provisions of paragraphs (2) to (7) of this Article. ... If the revision affects only part of a Land's territory, the referendum may be confined to the areas affected." The referendum took place on 7 June 1970, with 81.9% voting for Baden to remain part of Baden-Württemberg.

== Sources ==
- Union in Deutschland
