= List of presidents of the Landtag of Württemberg-Baden =

The following is a list of presidents of the Landtag of Württemberg-Hohenzollern.

== President of the Vervassunggebende Landesversammlung für Württemberg-Hohenzollern ==
Name	Period	Party
Wilhelm Simpendörfer	July 15, 1946–1946	CDU

== Presidents of the Landtag ==
Name	Period	Party
Wilhelm Simpendörfer	December 10, 1946–December 20, 1946	CDU
Wilhelm Keil	January 15, 1947–1952	SPD

== Sources ==
- Landtag von Baden-Württemberg (HrSg.): Mdl, die Abgeordneten der Landtage in Baden Württemberg 1946-1978, Stuttgart 1978 ISBN 3-12-911930-2
