= Electorate of Baden =

State of the Holy Roman Empire (1803–1806)

Electorate of Baden Kurfürstentum Baden (German)
- 1803–1806
- Flag Coat of arms

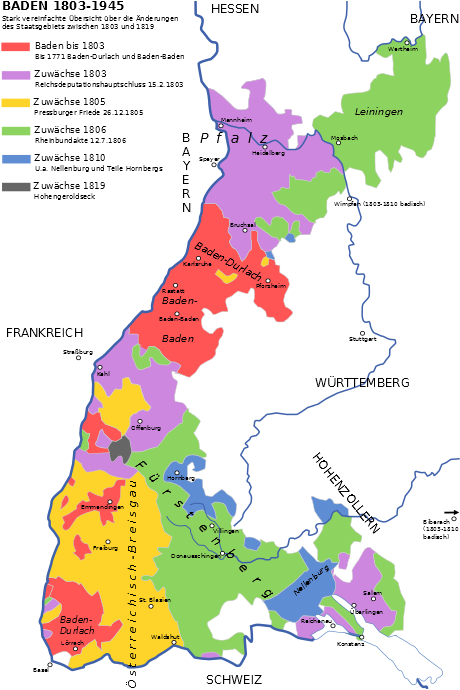
- Electorate of Baden
- Status: State of the Holy Roman Empire
- Capital: Karlsruhe
- Common languages: German
- Religion: Roman Catholic, Protestantism
- Government: Enlightened despotism
- Elector of Baden
  - 1803-1806: Karl Friedrich, Elector of Baden
- Historical era: Napoleonic Wars
  - Established: 1803
  - Disestablished: 1806
Preceded by	Succeeded by
Margraviate of Baden	Grand Duchy of Baden
- Today part of: Germany

The Electorate of Baden (German: Kurfürstentum Baden) was a State of the Holy Roman Empire from 1803 to 1806. In 1803, the Imperial diet bestowed the office of Prince-elector to Charles Frederick, but in 1806, Francis II dissolved the Empire. Baden then achieved sovereignty, and Charles Frederick became Grand Duke.

== History ==
The French Revolution began in 1789, and at its onset the Margraviate of Baden was united under Charles Frederick, but it did not form a compact territory. Its total area was only about 1,350 square miles (3,500 km^{2}), consisting of a number of isolated districts lying on either bank of the upper Rhine. Charles Frederick endeavored to acquire the intervening stretches of land, so as to give territorial unity to his country. His opportunity to do so came during the French Revolutionary Wars. When war broke out between the French First Republic and the Holy Roman Empire in 1792, the Margraviate of Baden fought for the House of Habsburg. However, their country was devastated as a result, and in 1796 the Margrave was compelled to pay an indemnity and to cede his territories on the left bank of the Rhine to the French First Republic.

Fortune, however, soon turned his way. With the German Mediatisation of 1803, and largely owing to the good offices of Alexander I of Russia, Charles Frederick received the Bishopric of Constance, part of the Electorate of the Palatinate, and other smaller districts, together with the prestige of being named a Prince-elector. In 1805 he changed sides and fought for Napoleon. As a result, later in 1805, when the Peace of Pressburg occurred, he obtained Breisgau and other territories at the expense of the Austrian Empire (see Further Austria). In 1806, the Electorate of Baden signed the Rheinbundakte, joining the Confederation of the Rhine. Upon the dissolution of the Holy Roman Empire, Charles Frederick declared sovereignty and thus created the Grand Duchy of Baden, receiving other territorial additions as well.
