= Württemberg-Baden =

State of the Federal Republic of Germany

- Part of US-administered Germany; State of West Germany
- 1945–1952
- Flag Coat of arms

- Württemberg-Baden (deep orange) within the US-administered zone of post-war Germany (pale orange)
- Capital: Stuttgart
- Area
  - 1950: 15,700 km^{2} (6,100 sq mi)
- Population
  - 1950: 3,908,000
- Historical era: Aftermath of World War II
  - Established: 19 September 1945
  - State of the Federal Republic of Germany: 23 May 1949
  - Disestablished: 25 April 1952
Preceded by	Succeeded by
Free People's State of Württemberg; Republic of Baden	Baden-Württemberg
- Today part of: Germany

Württemberg-Baden was a state of the Federal Republic of Germany. It was created in 1945 by the United States occupation forces, after the previous states of Baden and Württemberg had been split up between the US and French occupation zones. Its capital was Stuttgart. In 1952, Württemberg-Baden merged with Württemberg-Hohenzollern and Baden into the present state of Baden-Württemberg.

== History ==
Württemberg-Baden consisted of the northern halves of the former states of Württemberg and Baden. The southern border of this part of the US-administered zone was set so that the autobahn connecting Karlsruhe and Munich (today the A8) was completely contained within the American zone. The three major subdivisions of the American zone (Greater Hesse, Bavaria and Württemberg-Baden) were declared on 19 September 1945.

On 24 November 1946, a new constitution was enacted and Württemberg-Baden's first parliament was elected. On 23 May 1949, the state became a founding member of the Federal Republic of Germany.

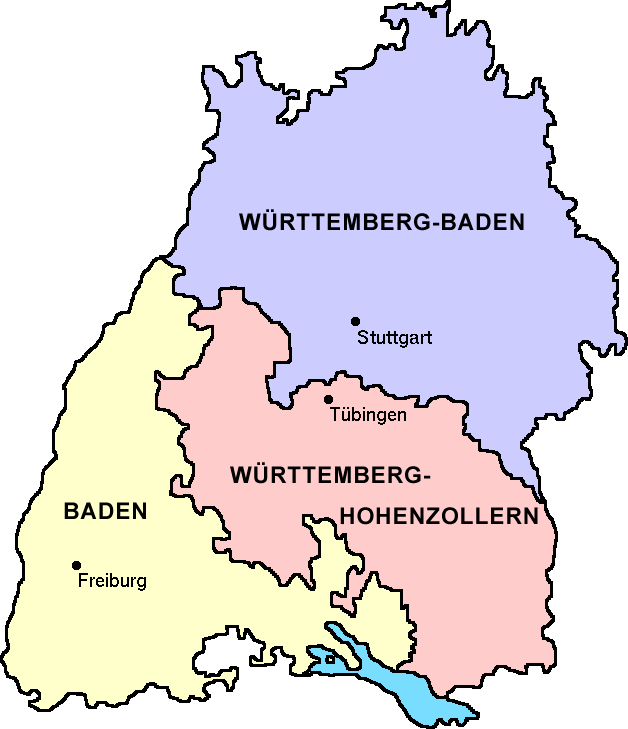
The three states that merged to form Baden-Württemberg in 1952

A straw poll was held on 24 September 1950 in Württemberg-Baden, Württemberg-Hohenzollern and Baden regarding a merger of the three states, followed by a public referendum on 9 December 1951. On both occasions, voters in Württemberg-Baden returned a clear majority in favour of a merger. All three states were merged and the modern German state of Baden-Württemberg was founded on 25 April 1952.

== Politics ==
The only minister-president of Württemberg-Baden was Reinhold Maier (DVP, then FDP; 1946–1952). Maier went on to become the first minister-president of Baden-Württemberg upon its formation in 1952.

Württemberg-Baden was subdivided into two administrative districts, known as Landesbezirke. The boundaries for these two districts were taken from two former state sections that comprised Württemberg-Baden. These two districts remain largely unchanged today as the Regierungsbezirke of Stuttgart (Württemberg) and Karlsruhe (Baden) within Baden-Württemberg.

== Flag and coat of arms ==
The flag of Württemberg-Baden, adopted in 1947, was the black-red-gold tricolour flag of Germany which was later also adopted again by the new German states founded in 1949, the Federal Republic of Germany and the German Democratic Republic.

The coat of arms merges elements from the two predecessor states: the red stripe on a golden field of the coat of arms of Baden and the three deer antlers of the coat of arms of Württemberg.

== See also ==
- List of presidents of the Landtag of Württemberg-Baden
