= Flag of Baden =

Historical flag of former German state

3:5 Flag of Baden (1855-1891)

3:5 Flag of Baden (1891-1935, 1947–1952)

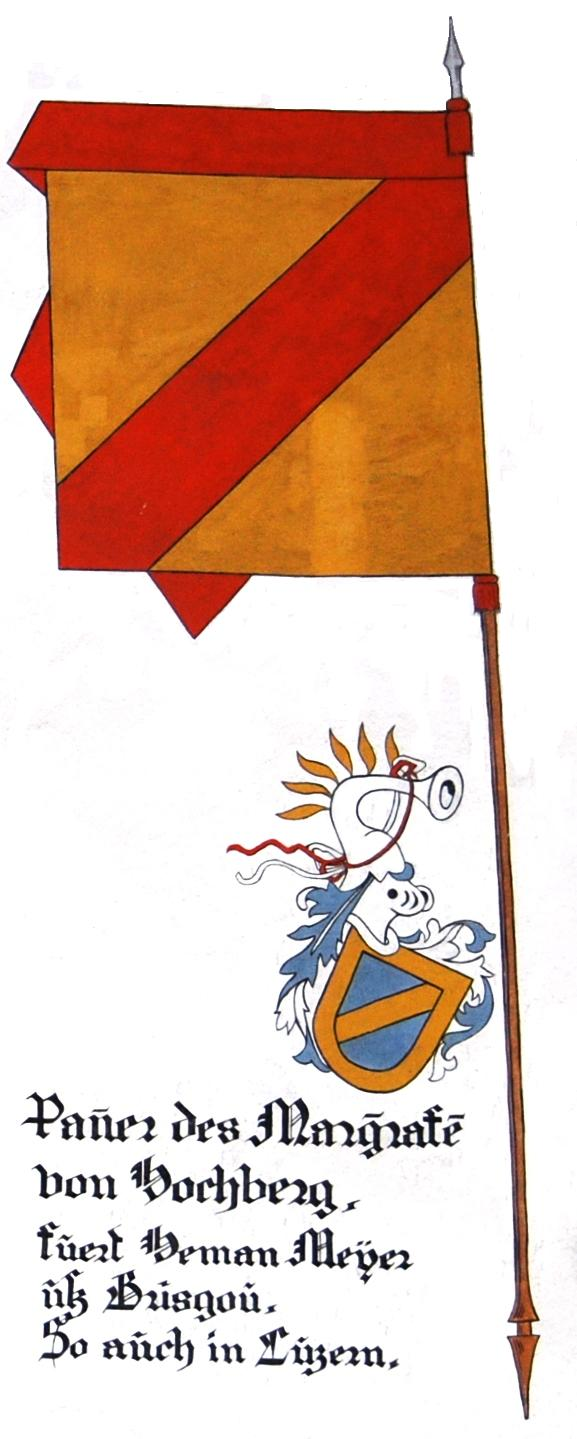
Banner of Otto I, Margrave of Baden-Hachberg (d. 1386, drawn after the depiction in Sempach chapel)

The flag of Baden displayed a combination of yellow and red, the heraldic colours of the former German state of Baden.

== Overview ==
A red-yellow bicolour was introduced as the flag of the Grand Duchy of Baden (1806–1918) in 1855. This was replaced with a yellow-red-yellow triband in 1891. Following the abolition of the monarchy at the end of World War I, the Republic of Baden was established, which continued to use this triband flag. After the Nazi Party came to power in Germany in 1933, the individual German states and their symbols were eventually suppressed. After World War II, the southern half of Baden became part of the French Occupation Zone and established as South Baden. South Baden used the yellow-red-yellow triband as its flag until the state's disestablishment in 1952, when it became part of the modern German state of Baden-Württemberg.

The flag is still a common sight in the Baden region today, as it is used by many private citizens. The flag is hoisted at the top of the Karlsruhe castle.

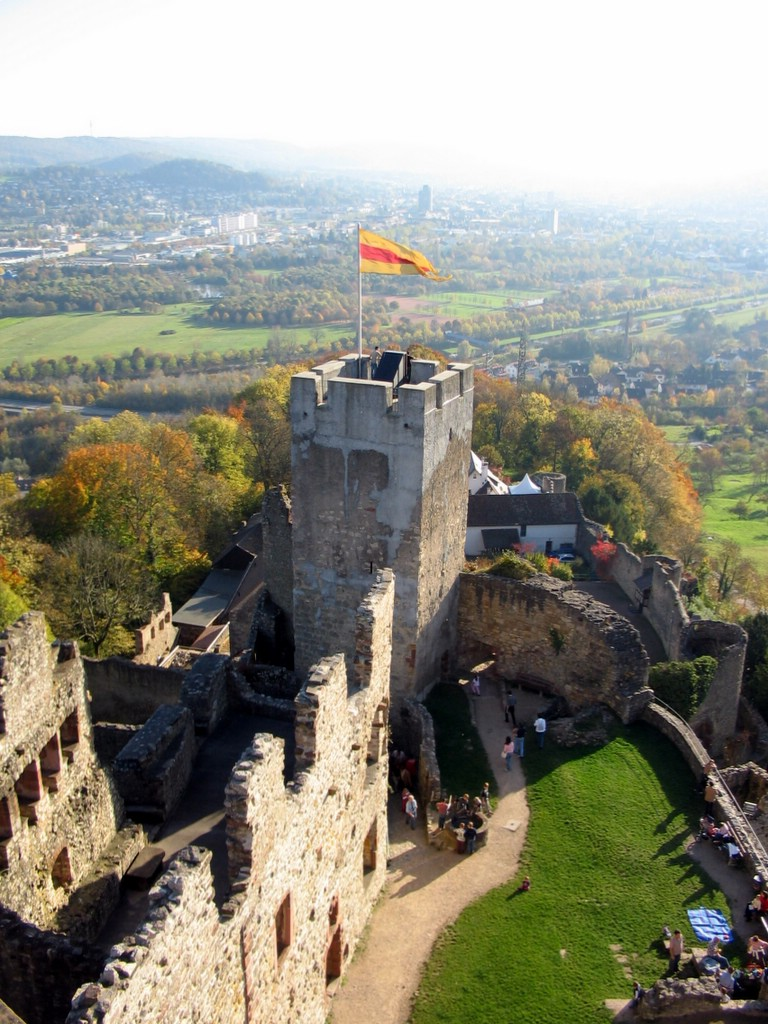
The Baden flag flown from Rötteln Castle in Lörrach

== History ==
Margraviate of Baden (1243-1803)

Electorate of Baden and Grand Duchy of Baden (1803-1848)

Grand Duchy of Baden (1848-1862)

Grand Duchy of Baden (1855-1891)

Grand Duchy of Baden (1862-1871)

Grand Duchy of Baden, Republic of Baden and South Baden (1891–1952)
