= Flag of Thuringia =

Flag of the German state of Thuringia

Thuringia
- Landesflagge
- Use: Civil flag
- Proportion: 3:5 (or 1:2)
- Adopted: 1921, 1946, 1991
- Design: A bicolor of white over red.
- Landesdienstflagge des Freistaats Thüringen
- Use: State flag
- Proportion: 3:5 (or 1:2)
- Adopted: 1991
- Design: The civil flag with the addition of the coat of arms.

Both the civil and state flag of the German state of Thuringia feature a bicolour of white over red. Introduced with the formation of the state of Thuringia within the Weimar Republic in 1920, it is the reverse of the flag of Hesse, both flags ultimately reflecting the heraldic colours of the Ludovingian rulers of the medieval Duchy of Thuringia. The flag's similarity to that of Poland is coincidental.

Like many German state's flags, the most commonly used size commercially is 3:5, although in law it is stated as being 'at least 1:2'. The civil bicolour flag of white over red was used in the Weimar Republic, and formally abolished in 1935, under the reforms of the Third Reich. It was re-adopted 1946 when Thuringia became a state again, and again abolished 1952 under governing reforms of the German Democratic Republic. When Germany was reunited, Thuringia became a state yet again, and the flag was re-adopted in 1991. It was immediately accepted as Landesflagge after the reunification and the re-establishment of Thuringia as a state on 3 October 1990. The first legal regulation was the Gesetz über die Hoheitszeichen of 30 January 1991.

The new arms of Thuringia are the old arms of the Ludovingian Landgraves of Thuringia, with a couple of alterations. Because of the similarities between Hesse and Thuringia Coats of Arms, the flags appear similar too.

== History ==
Schwarzburg-Sondershausen (1599–1918)

Saxe-Altenburg (1893–1918)

Saxe-Meiningen

Saxe-Hildburghausen

Saxe-Gotha-Altenburg

Principality of Reuss-Greiz

Principality of Reuss-Gera

Duchy of Saxe-Eisenach (1813–1897)

Duchy of Saxe-Eisenach (1897–1918)

Saxe-Coburg and Gotha (1911–1920)

1933 flag design

== See also ==
- Coat of arms of Thuringia
- Flags of German states
