= Red Ensign Group =

Group of UK shipping registries

The Red Ensign Group is a collaboration of United Kingdom shipping registries including British Overseas Territories and Crown dependencies. It takes its name from the Red Ensign ("Red Duster") flag flown by British civil merchant ships. Its stated purpose is to combine resources to maintain safety and quality across the British fleet. As of 2018 it ranked the ninth largest such group in the world, with approximately 1,300 vessels. Sir Alan Massey of the UK Maritime and Coastguard Agency commented: ".. keeping [ships] inside the REG family means that you still have some influence over their quality and performance... We can take administrative measures against members of [it] if we want to so as to ensure that safety is brought up to the necessary standards..." The vessels also receive British Consular assistance and protection.

The Red Ensign Group has two categories:

== Category 1 ==
(Ships of any type, length, or tonnage): United Kingdom, Bermuda, British Virgin Islands, Cayman Islands, Gibraltar, and the Isle of Man. Bermuda has promoted its status in Category 1 to encourage ship owners "...looking for better flags for their ships..." to register in their country.

United Kingdom

Bermuda

British Virgin Islands

Cayman Islands

Gibraltar

Isle of Man

== Category 2 ==
(Commercial ships and yachts of up to 150 GT, pleasure craft up to 400 GT): Anguilla, Falkland Islands, Guernsey, Jersey, Montserrat, St. Helena, and the Turks and Caicos Islands.

Anguilla

Falkland Islands

Guernsey

Jersey

Montserrat

Saint Helena

Turks and Caicos Islands

A ship registered in any country within the Red Ensign group is entitled to fly the Red Ensign, or it can choose to fly the Red Ensign defaced with its home port national colors. As an example in 2011 the home port and registry of RMS Queen Mary 2 was changed from Southampton, Great Britain, to Hamilton, Bermuda, a UK overseas territory. Despite the registry change she continues to fly the undefaced Red Ensign rather than the Bermuda Red Ensign.

Vessel registration can also be easily changed from one Group country to another. Once a vessel meets all of the requirements to be registered in one Group country, no other requirements are needed for a change to any other Group country. Only the application papers for the new registry are needed. For example a vessel originally registered in the United Kingdom can be easily changed to the Cayman Islands to lower an operator's tax liability while still being able to fly the Red Ensign. This practice has resulted in criticism from maritime unions who argue that the REG is being used as a Flag of convenience to avoid taxes and use cheap foreign labor.
