= Flag of Lower Saxony =

Lower Saxony
- State civil flag (Landesflagge)
- Use: Civil and state flag
- Proportion: 2:3
- Adopted: 1951
- State Flag (Landesdienstflagge) at sea
- Use: State ensign
- Proportion: 3:5
- Adopted: 1951

The flag of Lower Saxony consists of the flag of the Federal Republic of Germany in Schwarz-Rot-Gold, with the coat of arms of Lower Saxony, shifted slightly toward the hoist. This flag is the civil and state flag. A double tailed version in 3:5 ratio is used as the state ensign.

== History ==
The flag of Lower Saxony was introduced on 1 May 1951, and made official on 13 October 1952. In the aftermath of World War II a neutral flag was needed for the state of Lower Saxony which consisted of the formerly separate entities of Hanover, Brunswick, Oldenburg, and Schaumburg-Lippe.

Hanover

Flag of Brunswick

Oldenburg

Schaumburg-Lippe

Until the official launch of the current flag of Lower Saxony, the former national flags of their respective regions were used at official functions. Developed in parallel, there was a design using the Guelph Hanoverian flag of horizontal yellow and white stripes with the coat of arms in the middle. However, the non-Hanoverian parts of the state rejected this design. Today, the former national flags of Hanover, Brunswick, Oldenburg and Schaumburg-Lippe are seen only at historical or folk events, such as festivals.

Kingdom of Hanover (1837–1866)

Province of Hanover (1868–1946)

State of Hanover (1946)

== See also ==
- Flags of German states
