= Flag of Schleswig-Holstein =

German state flag

Schleswig-Holstein
- Landesflagge
- Use: Civil flag
- Proportion: 3:5 (or 1:2)
- Adopted: 1948
- Design: A horizontal tricolour of blue, white, and red.
- Landesdienstflagge des Landes Schleswig-Holstein
- Use: State flag
- Proportion: 3:5 (or 1:2)
- Adopted: 1948
- Design: The civil flag with the addition of the coat of arms.

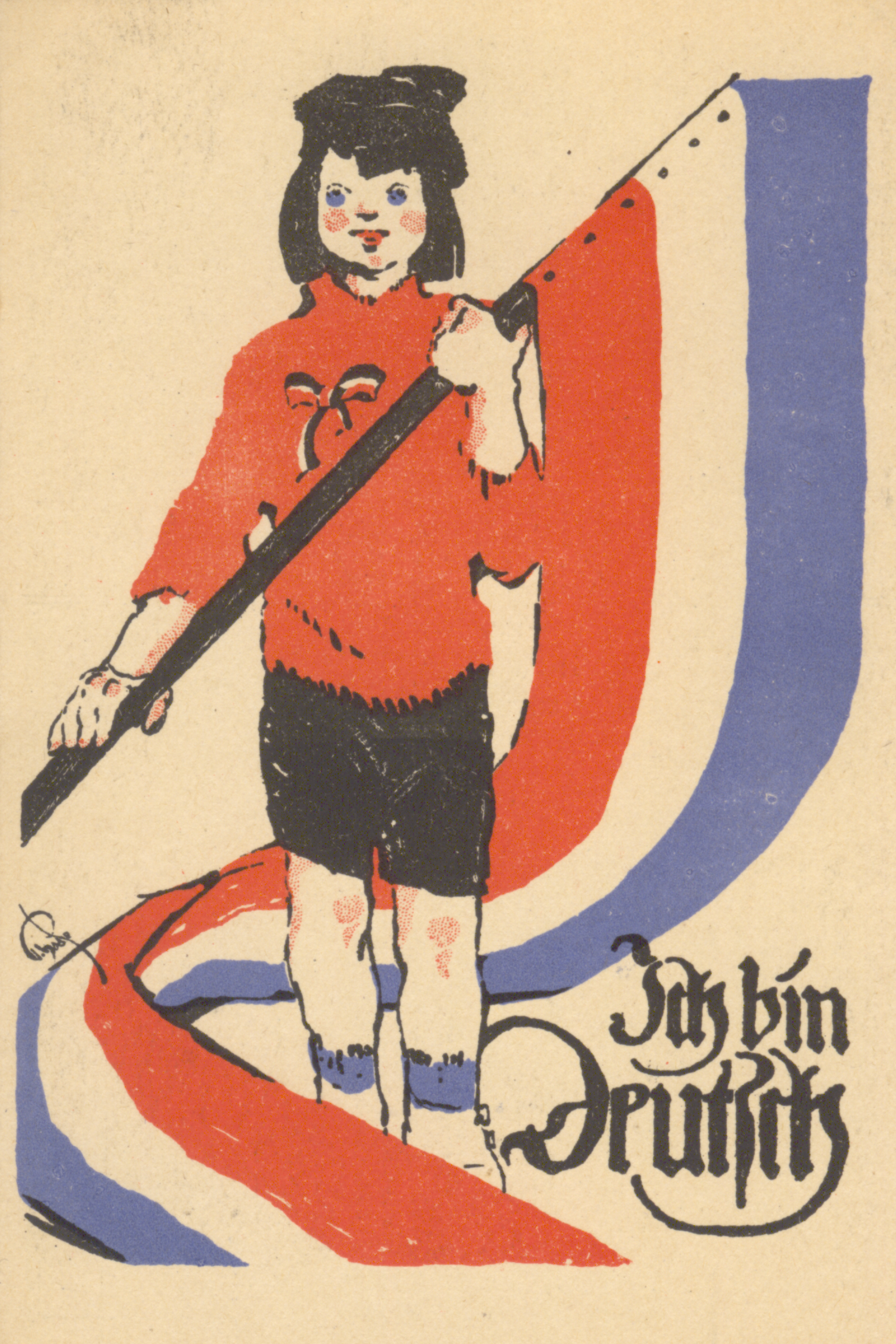
Schleswig flag on a 1920 postcard, with text "I am German."

The flag of Schleswig-Holstein is a horizontal tricolour of blue, white, and red. Schleswig-Holstein is one of the 16 states of Germany, comprising most of the historical duchy of Holstein and the southern part of the former Duchy of Schleswig.

== Design ==
The flag was introduced in 1843 and banned in 1845. It was reintroduced in 1867 after the Prussian annexation of Schleswig-Holstein. It was again abolished in 1935.

After the British Military Government made Schleswig-Holstein a German state in 1946, this flag was first hoisted after some debate on 29 August 1946. It was formally established as the flag on 18 January 1957. The plain tricolour is the state's civil flag. Government authorities use the state flag (Landesdienstflagge), where the flag is defaced by the state coat of arms.

The tricolour was previously used for the Prussian province of Schleswig-Holstein (1867-1935). It is almost identical to the flags of the former Kingdom of Yugoslavia and Serbia and Montenegro, as well as the flag of the Netherlands (albeit inverted).

=== Colors ===
Flag legislation defines the "state colors" as simply "blue-white-red", with no further specifications. On 2 June 1999, the federal cabinet introduced a corporate design for the German government which defined "blue" as RGB 0,119,182 or PANTONE® 307, and red as RGB 192,0,60 or PANTONE® 200, but it is unclear if these guidelines apply to the states, and in any case, in practice the specific shades can vary wildly, especially in unofficial uses.

Colour scheme	Blue	Red
CMYK	100.40.0.0	0.100.65.10
CMYK	100.20.0.0 (Note: For newspapers.)	0.100.60.0
Pantone (approximation)	307	200
Decimal RGB	0, 119, 182	192, 0, 60

== Gallery ==
Duchy of Schleswig

Saxe-Lauenburg

Duchy of Holstein

Free and Hanseatic City of Lübeck

British Heligoland (1807–1890)

Government Ensign of British Heligoland (1807–1890)

Flag of the Lieutenant-Governor of British Heligoland (1807–1890)

Province of Schleswig-Holstein (1867–1935)

Flag of Southern Schleswig Danes

The North Frisians flag has like the coat of arms of North Frisia, the Friisk Gesäts, official status.

== See also ==
- Flags of German states
- Flag of Serbia and Montenegro - a nearly identical flag
- List of municipal flags of Schleswig-Holstein
