= Flag of Berlin =

German state flag

Berlin
- Landesflagge (state flag)
- Use: Civil flag and ensign
- Proportion: 3:5
- Adopted: 26 May 1954
- Design: A tricolor of red-white-red, defaced with an emblem.

The state flag of Berlin, Germany has three stripes of red-white-red, the two outer stripes each occupying a fifth of its height, the middle the remaining three-fifths. It is emblazoned with a bear on the civil flag, while it bears the coat of arms of Berlin on the state flag.

The civil flag of West Berlin was adopted on 26 May 1954. Designed by Ottfried Neubecker, it came in second in the 1952 contest, the winner having been rejected by the Senate. The bear is placed slightly off-center toward the left.

A bear could be found on seals, coins, and signet rings from as early as the late 12th century (but not as a heraldic charge before 1709), presumably due to a canting association with the city's name.

The state flag replaces the bear with the full coat of arms, with the bear inside the escutcheon. Being the state flag for West Berlin, it became the flag of the entire city after the reunification of Germany in 1990. Prior to that, it had also been the naval ensign, as no other existing flag could be used. The proportions of the flag are 3:5. However, it was only used until 2007 when the Abgeordnetenhaus passed a bill to abolish the state flag. Since then, Berlin has had only one official flag.

== Historical flags ==
Between 1618 and 1861 a bicolor of black over white was used as both a civil and state flag, under Brandenburg and successive Prussian rules.

Between 1861 and 1912, a horizontal triband ("tricolor") of black, red, and white was used in the proportions of 2:3. It was designed by Ernst Fidicin based on the colors of Brandenburg following the coronation of Wilhelm I on 19 December 1861.

Between 1913 and 1954, the civil flag was similar to the current one, except the design of the bear was different. Until 1935, the emblem itself was not established.

From 1955 on, East Berlin had the addition of two white stripes taking the outside halves of the upper and lower red stripes, and a slightly different design for the bear inside an escutcheon, topped with a crown. The East Berlin flag was therefore a slightly modified version of the old state flag, with the civil flag being deliberately avoided in East Berlin—and conversely, adopted as official in West Berlin—due to the bear in the civil flag being off-center to the left and facing left, strongly suggesting an orientation toward the West. The West Berlin flag was adopted for all of Berlin after 1990.

Flag of Berlin, 1618–1861

Flag of Berlin, 1861–1912

Flag of Berlin, 1913–1934 (Civil Flag, 1913–1954)

State Flag of Berlin 1934–1954

Flag of East Berlin, 1954–1990

Flag of West Berlin, 1954–1990

State Flag of Berlin, 1990–2007 (State Flag of West Berlin, 1954–1990)

Standard of members of the Berlin Senate, 1990–2007 (Standard of members of the West Berlin Senate, 1954–1990)

== Flag days ==
The senator for the Interior and Sports has designated several official flag days. On these days, the Berlin flag must be flown on all public buildings. They include:

Date	Name	Reason
27 January	Commemoration Day for the Victims of National Socialism	Anniversary of the liberation of Auschwitz concentration camp (1945)
8 March	International Women's' Day	International Women's' Day is a public holiday in Berlin since 2018
18 March	Anniversary of the 18 March 1848	Anniversary of Uprisings during the German Revolution (1848)
1 May	Labour Day	Established for German labours to demonstrate for the promotion of workers' rights
8 May	Commemoration Day for the Liberation from National Socialism	Anniversary of the Victory in Europe Day 1945.
9 May	Europe Day	Anniversary of the Schuman Declaration (1950)
23 May	Constitution Day	Anniversary of the German Basic Law (1949)
17 June	Anniversary of 17 June 1953	Anniversary of the Uprising of 1953 in East Berlin and East Germany
20 June	Commemoration Day for the Victims of Deportation	Introduced in 2015 by the German Federal Government (World Refugee Day)
20 July	Anniversary of 20 July 1944	Anniversary of the plot around Claus von Stauffenberg who tried to assassinate Adolf Hitler unsuccessfully (1944)
3 October	Day of German Unity	Anniversary of German reunification (1990)
9 November	Commemoration Day for the November Revolution and Declaration of the Republic (1918), November pogroms (1938) and the Fall of the Wall (1989)	
The Second Sunday before Advent	People's Mourning Day	In memory of all killed during wartime

On the Commemoration Day for the Victims of National Socialism and People's Mourning Day, flags must be flown at half-mast. In addition, they are to be flown on days of the election of the federal president, to the European Parliament, the Bundestag, the Abgeordnetenhaus and borough assemblies.

== Flags of boroughs in Berlin ==
All 12 boroughs have a flag.

Charlottenburg-Wilmersdorf

Friedrichshain-Kreuzberg

Lichtenberg

Marzahn-Hellersdorf

Mitte

Neukölln

Pankow

Reinickendorf

Spandau

Steglitz-Zehlendorf

Tempelhof-Schöneberg

Treptow-Köpenick

== See also ==
- Berolina, personification of Berlin
- Flags of German states
