= Württemberg-Hohenzollern =

State of West Germany

Coordinates: 48°31′N 9°3′E

Württemberg-Hohenzollern Wurtemberg-Hohenzollern
- Part of French-administered Germany; State of West Germany
- 1945–1952
- Flag Coat of arms

- Württemberg-Hohenzollern (dark blue) within the French-administered zone of post-war Germany (light blue)
- Capital: Tübingen
- Area
  - 1950: 10,406 km^{2} (4,018 sq mi)
- Population
  - 1950: 1,184,000
- Legislature: Landtag of Württemberg-Hohenzollern
- Historical era: Aftermath of World War II
  - Established: 1945
  - State of West Germany: 23 May 1949
  - Disestablished: 25 April 1952
Preceded by	Succeeded by
Free People's State of Württemberg; Province of Hohenzollern	Baden-Württemberg
- Today part of: Germany

Württemberg-Hohenzollern ([ˈvʏʁtəmbɛʁk hoːənˈtsɔlɐn]; French: Wurtemberg-Hohenzollern) was a West German state created in 1945 as part of the French post-World War II occupation zone. Its capital was Tübingen. In 1952, it was merged into the newly founded state of Baden-Württemberg.

== History ==
Württemberg-Hohenzollern should not be confused with the larger Gau Württemberg-Hohenzollern of the same name that existed from 1933–1945 during the Third Reich.

Württemberg-Hohenzollern consisted of the southern half of the former state of Württemberg, the Prussian administrative region of Hohenzollern and the Bavarian district of Lindau. The northern half of Württemberg became part of the state of Württemberg-Baden under US-administration. The division between north and south was set so that the Autobahn connecting Karlsruhe and Munich (today the A8) was completely contained within the American zone.

On 18 May 1947, a new constitution was enacted and Württemberg-Baden's first parliament was elected. With the formation of West Germany on 23 May 1949, Württemberg-Baden joined the federal republic.

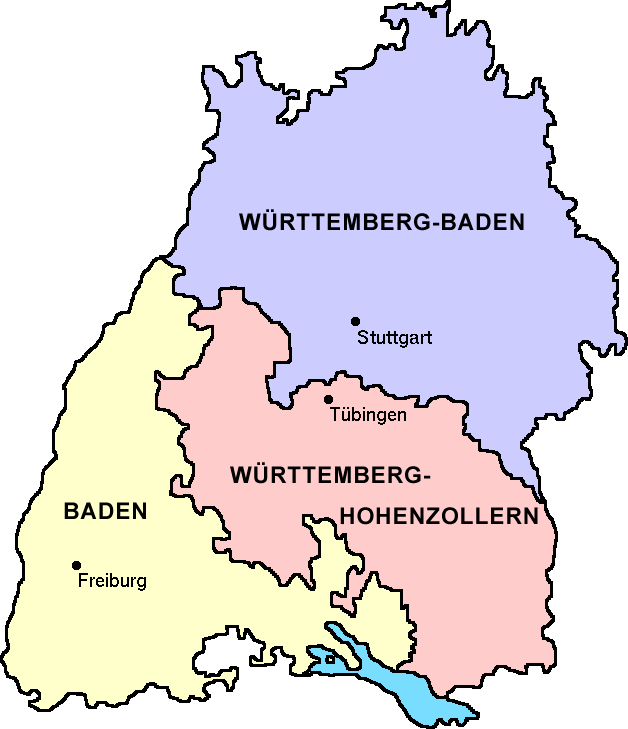
The three states that merged to form Baden-Württemberg in 1952

A straw poll was held on 24 September 1950 in Württemberg-Hohenzollern, Württemberg-Baden, and Baden regarding a merger of the three states. A public referendum was held on 9 December 1951. All three states were merged and the modern German state of Baden-Württemberg was founded on 25 April 1952.

== Arms ==
The coat of arms serves as the foundation of the Porsche brand logo. The red and black stripes are from the flag of the Electorate of Württemberg, while the gold quarters with black antlers are the ancient symbol of the County of Württemberg.

The coat of arms was the same as that which was featured on the coat of arms of the Free People's State of Württemberg of the Weimar Republic.

== List of minister-presidents ==
1. 1945–1947: Carlo Schmid (SPD)
2. 1947–1948: Lorenz Bock (CDU)
3. 1948–1952: Gebhard Müller (CDU)
