= Flag of Hesse =

German state flag

Hesse
- "Landesflagge"
- Use: Civil flag
- Proportion: 3:5 (or 1:2)
- Adopted: Approved 4 August, 1948
- Design: A bicolour of red over white
- Landesdienstflagge des Landes Hessen
- Use: State flag
- Proportion: 3:5 (or 1:2)
- Adopted: Approved 4 August, 1948
- Design: The civil flag with the addition of the coat of arms

The civil flag of Hesse, Germany, consists of a bicolour of a red top and a bottom white stripe, in the proportion 3:5. The state flag is similar, except it is emblazoned with the state coat of arms in the centre, and may only be used by government departments and services.

The colours red and white are based on that of the Ludovingian coat of arms, showing a lion with a ninefold horizontal white and red division. The coat of arms was inherited by the House of Hesse upon its split from the Duchy of Thuringia in 1247, and the flag came into use in the early modern Landgraviate of Hesse; the modern Grand Duchy of Hesse used a flag with two red stripes, as did the People's State of Hesse until 1933.

The flag of Thuringia was introduced in 1920, with its formation out of the fragmented Thuringian states (the Duchy of Thuringia had been absorbed into Saxony in 1400), as the reverse of the flag of Hesse.

The civil flag of Hesse resembles that of Monaco and, particularly, Indonesia.

It also resembles one of the flags of Alsace.

The Hessian ministry of the interior designated several official flag days. On these days, the flag of Hesse (alongside the flags of the European Union and Germany) must be flown on all official buildings. These days include:

Date	Name	Reason
27 January	Commemoration Day for the Victims of National Socialism	Anniversary of the Liberation of Auschwitz concentration camp (1945)
1 May	Labour Day	Established for German labour unions to demonstrate for the promotion of workers' rights
9 May	Europe Day	Anniversary of the Schuman Declaration (1950)
23 May	Constitution Day	Anniversary of the German Basic Law (1949)
17 June	Anniversary of 17 June 1953	Anniversary of the uprising of 1953 in the GDR
20 July	Anniversary of 20 June 1944	Anniversary of the failed assassination attempt on Adolf Hitler by Claus von Stauffenberg (1944)
Second Sunday in September	Hessian Memorial Day for Victims of Deportation	To honour all persons living in Hesse who suffered from deportation
3 October	Day of German Unity	Anniversary of German reunification (1990)
The second Sunday before Advent	People's Mourning Day	In memory of all killed during wartime
1 December	Hessian Constitution Day	Anniversary of the Hessian Constitution (1946)

On the Commemoration Day for the Victims of National Socialism and on People's Mourning Day, flags are flown at half-mast. Additionally, flags must be flown on days to the election to the European Parliament, the Bundestag, the Hessian Landtag and municipal elections.

== History ==
Free City of Frankfurt

Principality of Isenburg (1806–1815)

Kingdom of Westphalia (1807–1813)

Grand Duchy of Frankfurt (1810–1813)

Electorate of Hesse

Nassau-Usingen

Duchy of Nassau (1806–1866)

Grand Duchy of Hesse (1806–1918)

People's State of Hesse (1918–1945)

Free State Bottleneck (1919–1923)

Province of Hesse-Nassau (1868–1944)

Province of Kurhessen (1944–1945)

Province of Nassau (1944–1945)
