= South Baden =

Subdivision of the French occupation zone of post-World War II Germany

South Baden (1945–1946) Südbaden (German) Bade-du-Sud (French) Baden (1946–1952) Baden (German) Bade (French)
- Part of French-administered Germany; State of West Germany
- 1945–1952
- Flag Coat of arms

- Location of Baden (bright blue) within the French-administered zone of post-war Germany (pale blue)
- Capital: Freiburg im Breisgau Fribourg-en-Brisgau (in French)
- Area
  - 1950: 6,646 km^{2} (2,566 sq mi)
- Population
  - 1950: 1,399,000
- Historical era: Post-World War II
  - Established: 1945
  - State of West Germany: 23 May 1949
  - Disestablished: 25 April 1952
Preceded by	Succeeded by
Republic of Baden	Baden-Württemberg
- Today part of: Germany

South Baden (German: Südbaden; French: Bade-du-Sud), formed in December 1945 from the southern half of the former Republic of Baden, was a subdivision of the French occupation zone of post-World War II Germany. The state was later renamed to Baden (French: Bade) and became a founding state of the Federal Republic of Germany (West Germany, today simply Germany) in 1949. In 1952, Baden became part of the modern German state of Baden-Württemberg.

== Formation ==
At the Yalta Conference in 1945, France was allocated an occupation zone for the administration of post-war Germany. The south-west of Germany – previously consisting of Baden, Württemberg and the Prussian province of Hohenzollern – was divided between France in the south and the United States in the north. The border between the two zones was set so that the Autobahn connecting Karlsruhe and Munich (today the A8) was completely contained within the American zone; Bavaria was also placed under American administration. In the French zone, Hohenzollern and the southern half of Württemberg were merged to form Württemberg-Hohenzollern. The southern half of Baden was established as South Baden on 1 December 1945. Freiburg was designated as the capital of South Baden; the former capital of Baden (Karlsruhe) was in the American zone.

A constitution for Baden was enacted on 19 May 1947, whose preamble laid claim to this new state being the true successor of the old Baden: although most of its territory had only been part of Baden for the previous 150 years. To reinforce this claim, the constitution also adopted the pre-World War II Baden flag and coat of arms for the new state. The constitution also made it clear that the name of the state was "Baden" instead of "South Baden". In 1949, the Baden parliament voted in favour of the Basic Law for the Federal Republic of Germany and became a founding state of (West) Germany upon its formation on 23 May 1949.

== Politics ==
For the first year of its existence, South Baden was directly governed by the French military administration. After local elections in December 1946, the Badische Christlich-Soziale Volkspartei (BCSV) emerged as the strongest party and its leader, Leo Wohleb, was appointed by the French administration as president of the state secretariat. In April 1947, the BCSV became associated with the federal Christian Democratic Union (CDU), renaming itself to CDU Baden and was thus a predecessor of CDU Baden-Württemberg.

On 24 July 1947 the first and only state elections were held in Baden, with Wohleb's CDU winning an absolute majority of 55.9%. The SPB - the Baden branch of the SPD - came second with 22.4%. Since the French military administration still held many key executive powers in Baden, a single-party government was not possible despite the CDU's absolute majority. Attempts to form an all-party government failed, owing to disagreements regarding the inclusion of the Communist party (KPD). Eventually, a grand coalition between the CDU and SPB was formed, with Wohleb as minister-president. After the formation of the Federal Republic of Germany and the end of French administration, single-party governments were again permitted and the coalition was no longer needed; from 1949 until 1952, Wohleb governed Baden at the head of a CDU-only government.

== Disestablishment ==
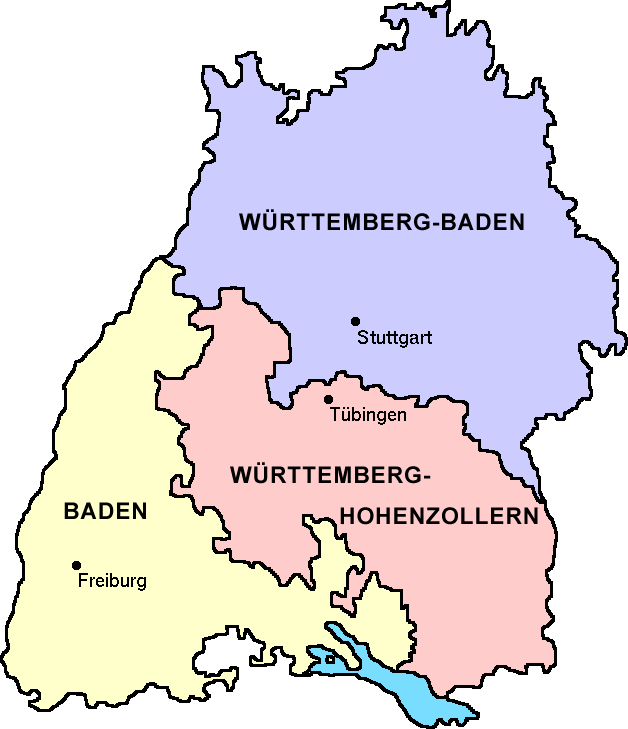
The three states that merged to form Baden-Württemberg in 1952

With the end of military rule in West Germany, the three western powers requested that state leaders should re-examine and finalise the borders that had been established during occupation. In the south west, it was undecided whether Baden and Württemberg should be re-established as separate states (with Württemberg absorbing Hohenzollern, since Prussia had been abolished) or merged to form a new state. In Baden, Wohleb was a strong opponent of a merger. In 1950 a straw poll regarding the merger of the three south-western states was carried out, followed by a referendum on 9 December 1951. Within the pre-1945 borders of Baden as whole, reflecting the views of those in South Baden, the majority opposed the merger and preferred a restoration of Baden. This vote in South Baden was outweighed by voters in the more populous Württemberg and in North Baden, where the merger was preferred. Following the referendum, the three south-west states were merged to form the modern German state of Baden-Württemberg on 25 April 1952.

Various legal contests were mounted against the referendum and the resulting merger. The newly founded Federal Constitutional Court of Germany (Bundesverfassungsgericht) rejected a nullification of the referendum in 1951, after the judges' vote ended in a draw. In 1956, the court concluded that the referendum in (South) Baden was not accepted by the majority and should be repeated. The Baden-Württemberg government did not allow this repeat to take place until 14 years later in 1970: that being 18 years after the merger. This time, the vote in (South) Baden was 81% in favour of the status quo.
