= Kherson fortress =

- Kherson, Ukraine
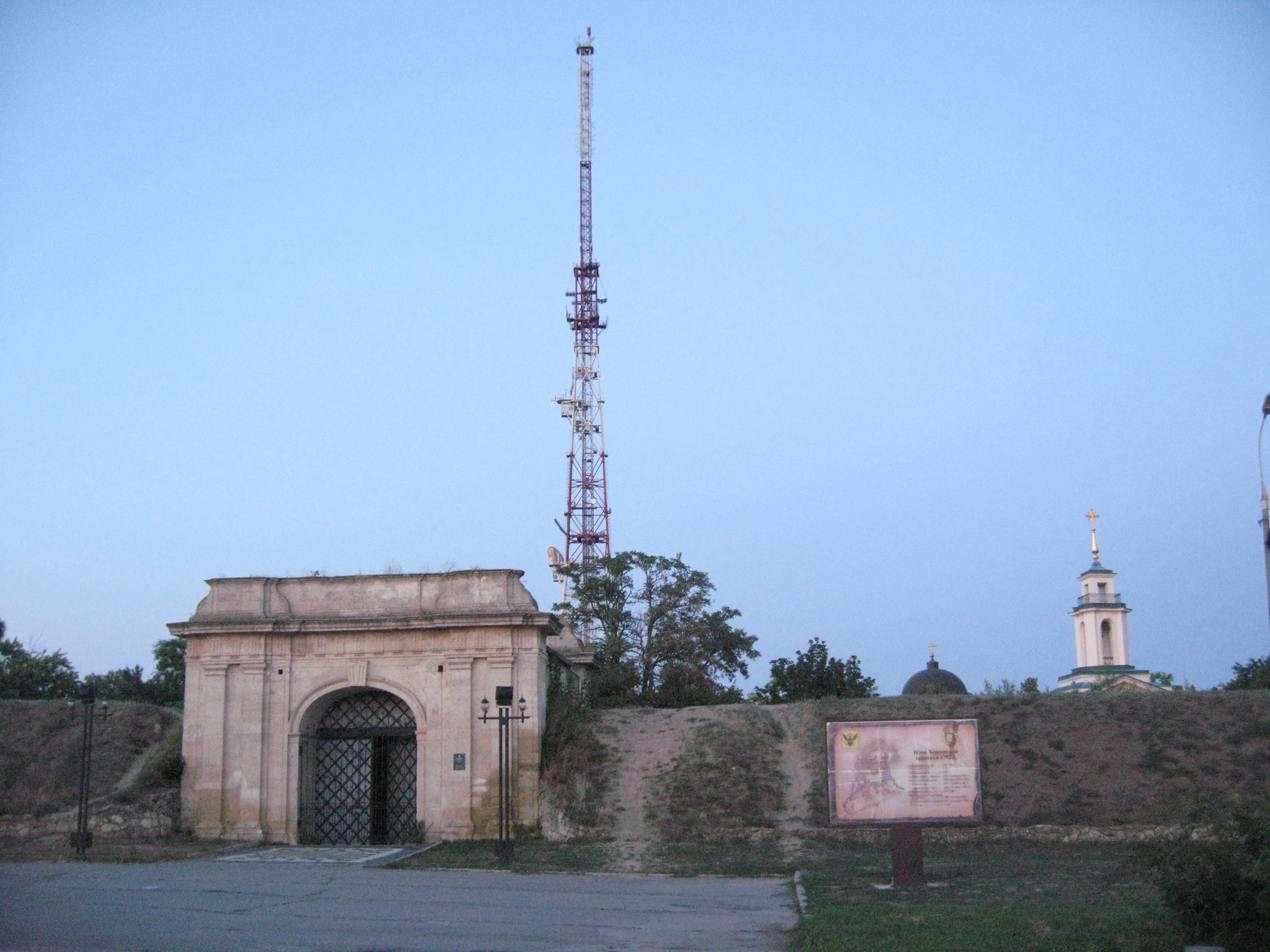
- Ochakiv Gate and the cathedral bell tower (right)

Site information
- Type: earthwork fort
- Owner: public domain

Location
- Coordinates: 46°38′20″N 32°37′35″E

Site history
- Built: 1778–1787
- Built by: M. Vetoshnikov
- In use: 1787–1835

The Kherson fortress (Ukrainian: Херсонська фортеця) is a former earthen fortress in the city of Kherson in southern Ukraine.

== History ==
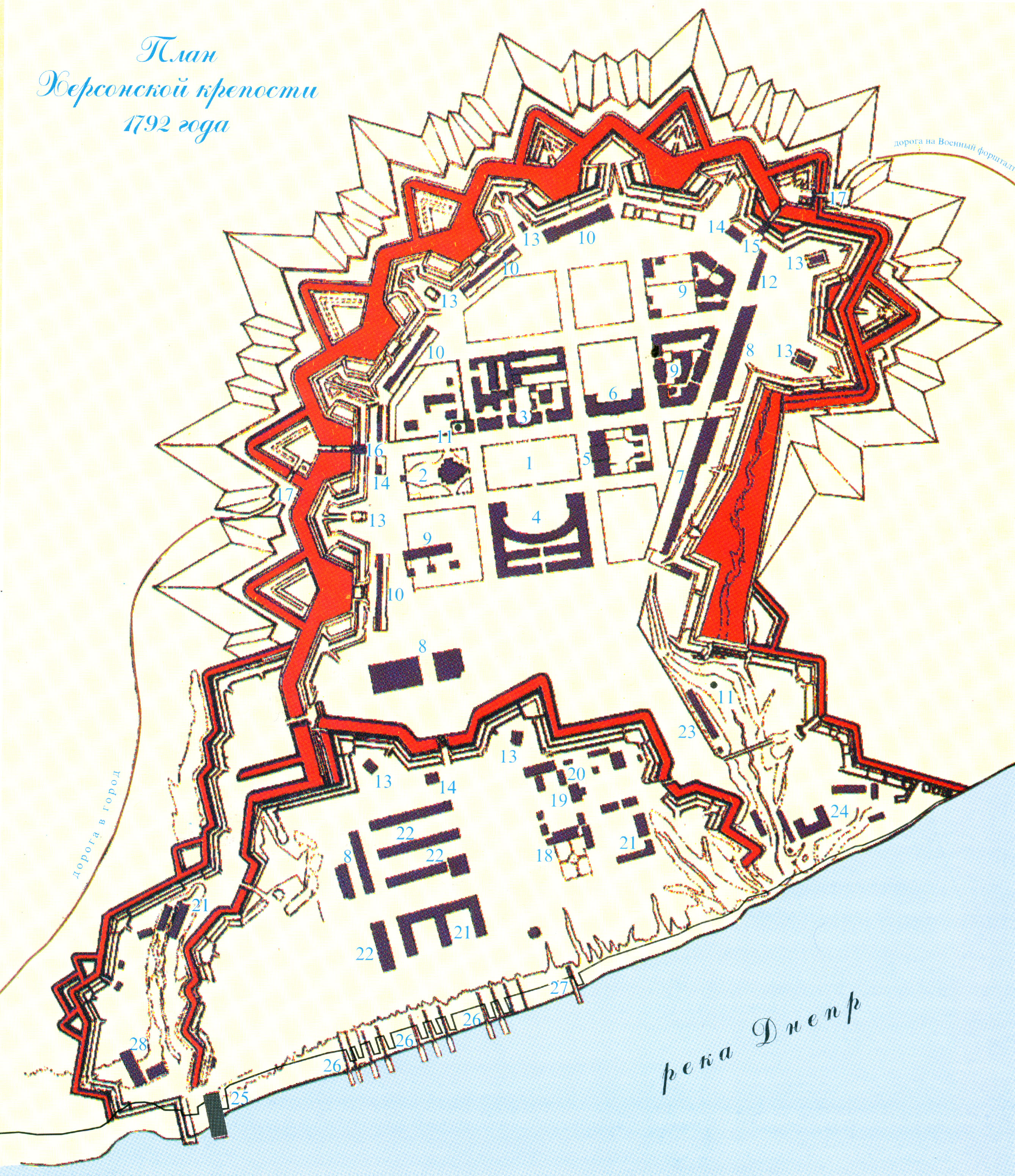
Plan of the fortress, 1792

The Kherson fortress was founded on September 8, 1778, according to the project of the chief architect of the Admiralty College, M. Vetoshnikov, on the site of the previously existing Ukrainian Cossack fortification Oleksandr-Shanets (before its establishment, there was a settlement of Bilikhovychi (Ukr. Біліховичі) on the territory of modern Kherson). In 1784-1785 the work plan was finally revised by the new head of construction works, M. Korsakov. One of the buildings was St. Catherine's Cathedral.

Until the beginning of 1787, Kherson was divided into 4 parts: the central one - the fortress, the Military Forstadt - to the east of the fortress, the Northern Forstadt - in the northwest direction, and the Greek city - to the west. The Kherson fortress was formed by a number of bastion buildings with a citadel, one side of which faced the banks of the Dnipro River. In the field arsenal there were up to 600 guns, a significant part of which, together with rifles and various ammunition, was transported here from the liquidated fortress of St. Elizabeth.

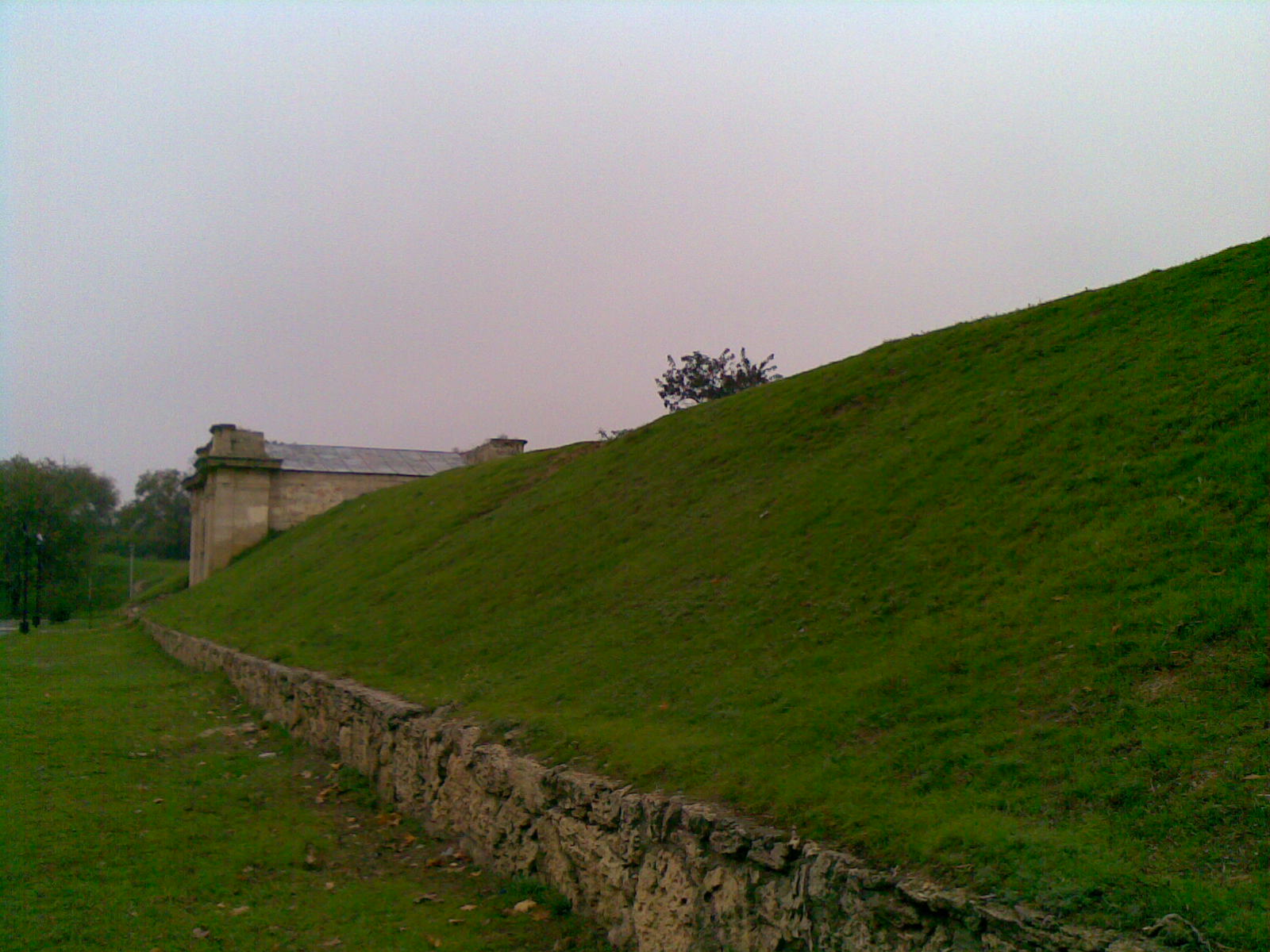
Remains of earthworks

In 1788, the construction of the fortress was practically completed. At that time, it became a model of earthen fortification construction. The fortress had an elongated star-shaped shape. Around it, a ditch was dug and an earthen rampart was filled, on the bastions of which 220 guns were installed, and inside there was a complex of administrative and industrial buildings. 8 infantry regiments were stationed in the stone barracks, which were designed for 24,000 soldiers. It also housed an engineer company and an internal garrison battalion.

In 1835 the fortress was liquidated. Part of it is now Kherson Fortress Park, known as Komsomol Park until 2016.
