= Yefrem Mukhin =

Russian physician (1766–1850)

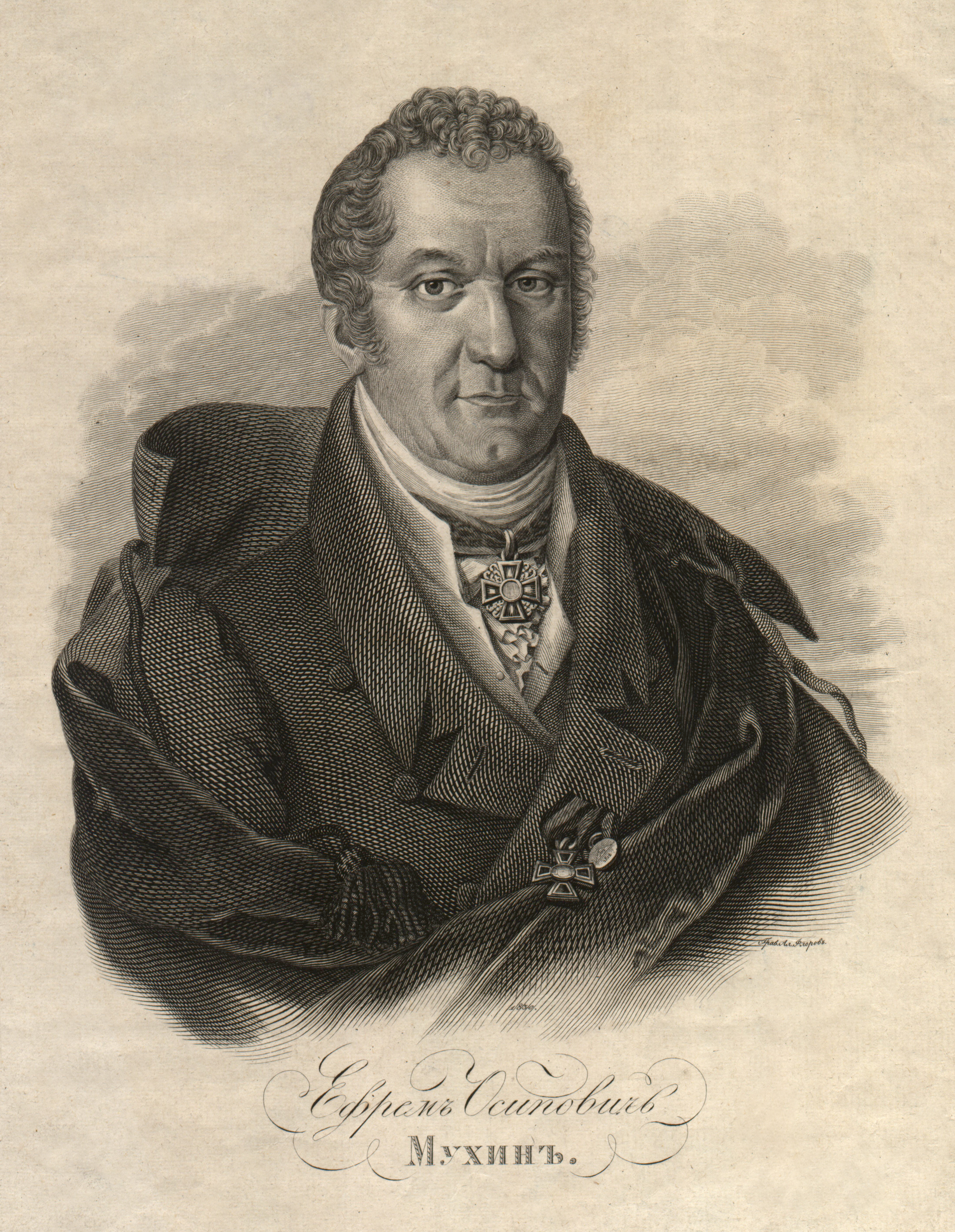
- An 1830 engraving by Alexander Florov
- Born: Yefrem Yosypovych Mukhin; 8 February 1766; Zarizhne, Sloboda Ukraine Governorate, Russian Empire
- Died: 12 February 1850 (aged 84); Koltsovo, Kaluga Governorate, Russian Empire
- Education: Kharkiv Collegium
- Spouses: Nadezhda Moskvina (m. 1803; died 1830) Natalia Kostrova (m. 1836; died 1845)
- Parents: Yosyp Mukhin (father); Marfa Mukhina (mother)
- Awards: Order of Saint Vladimir (1807, 1835); Order of Saint Anna (1824, 1831)
- Scientific career
- Fields: Medicine, surgery, anatomy
- Workplaces: Imperial Moscow University

Signature
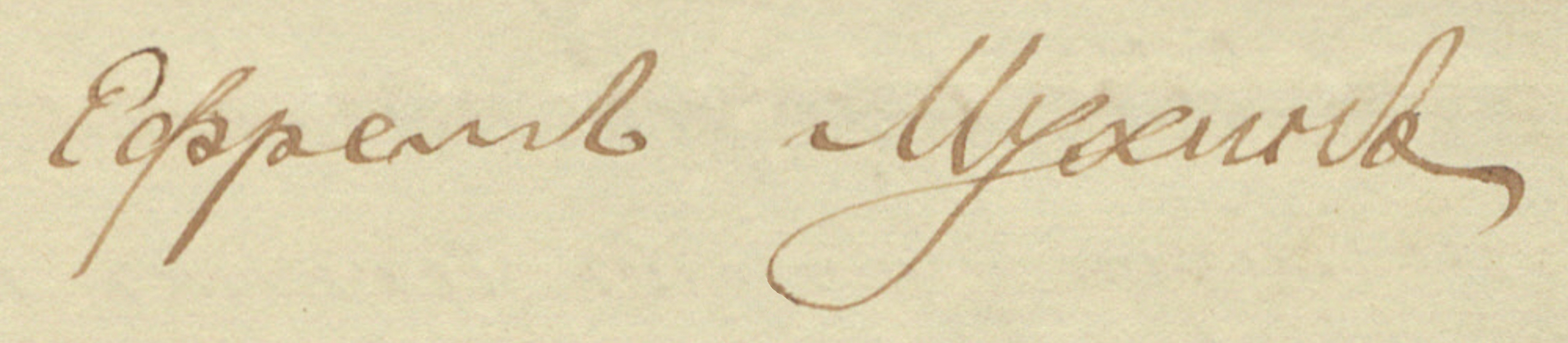

Yefrem Yosypovych Mukhin (Russian: Ефрем Осипович Мухин, Ukrainian: Єфрем Йосипович Мухін; 8 February [O.S. 28 January] 1766 – 12 February [O.S. 31 January] 1850) was a Russian medical doctor, surgeon, anatomist, physiologist, hygienist. One of the founders of the anatomical and physiological direction in Russian medicine. He is considered the founder of traumatology in Russia and Ukraine. Honorary Professor and Dean of the Faculty of Medicine of Imperial Moscow University, Active State Councillor.

== Biography ==
Yefrem Mukhin was born on 8 February 1766 into the noble family of Protoiereus Yosyp Mukhin and his wife Marfa, in Zarizhne near Chuhuiv, Sloboda Ukraine Governorate (present-day Kharkiv Oblast, Ukraine). From September 1781 he studied at the Kharkiv Collegium. In May 1787, he was assigned to the hospital at the Fortress of St. Elizabeth to care for the sick. In February 1789, he was transferred to the main hospital at the main apartment of Grigory Potemkin, where he received extensive practice "not only in one hospital, but also on the battlefield", including during the siege of Ochakov (1788).

After end of the Russo-Turkish War (1787–1792), he returned to the hospital in Yelysavethrad, where from December 1789 he was a prosector of anatomy. In January 1791, he was promoted to physician and began teaching osteology and the "science of dislocations and fractures" at the hospital's medical-surgical school, and also served as a surgeon.

In January 1795, he began attending lectures and practical classes at Imperial Moscow University, and in October he was hired as a doctor at the Moscow Military Hospital.

In August 1800, he received the degree of Doctor of Medicine and Surgery from Moscow University for his thesis entitled De Kentrologia, and in September took the position of associate professor at the Medical-Surgical Academy. At the same time, at the invitation of Metropolitan Platon Levshin, he taught in 1802–1808 "the entire course of medical sciences" at the Slavic Greek Latin Academy (without salary); also lectured at the Moscow Theological Academy.

He left the university in 1835 with the rank of professor and died in his estate in Koltsovo on 12 February 1850.

== Legacy ==
His name is on various medical colleges, medical buildings and some streets in Russian Federation in honour of his work and achievements.

In the city of Kropyvnytskyi (Ukraine) there is a medical college named in his honour.

== Awards and honours ==
- Medal "For Bravery in the Capture of Ochakov" (1788)
- Order of Saint Vladimir, 4th class (1807), 3rd class (1835)
- Medal "In Commemoration of the Patriotic War of 1812"
- Order of Saint Anna, 2nd class (1824), 2nd class with imperial crown (1831)
- Insignia of Irreproachable Service for XL years (1834)

== Publications ==
- Muchin, Ephremus (1804). De stimulis, corpus humanum vivum afficientibus (in Latin). Göttingen.
- Mukhin, Yefrem (1806). Первыя начала костоправной науки [The First Beginnings of Bonesetting Science] (in Russian). Moscow: In the printing house of S. Selivanovsky.
- Muchin, Ephremus (1817). De sensibilitatis sede et actione Oratio, quam in conventu solemni Universitatis caesareae litterarum Mosquensis A. 1817 d. vi Julii habuit Ephremus de Muchin, Consiliarius Collegiorum, Ordinis St. Wladimiri quartae classis Eques, Medicinae et Chirurgiae Doctor, Operator, Anatomiae, Physiologiae... (in Latin). Moscow: Typis Universitatis Caesareae.
- Muchin, Ephremus (1823). "De Kentrologia generatim". In Lenhossék, Michaële A. (ed.). Institutiones physiologiae organismi humani (in Latin). Vol. 1. Moscow. pp. 60–131.
