= Fortress of St. Elizabeth =

Site in Kropyvnytskyi, Ukraine

- Kropyvnytskyi, Ukraine
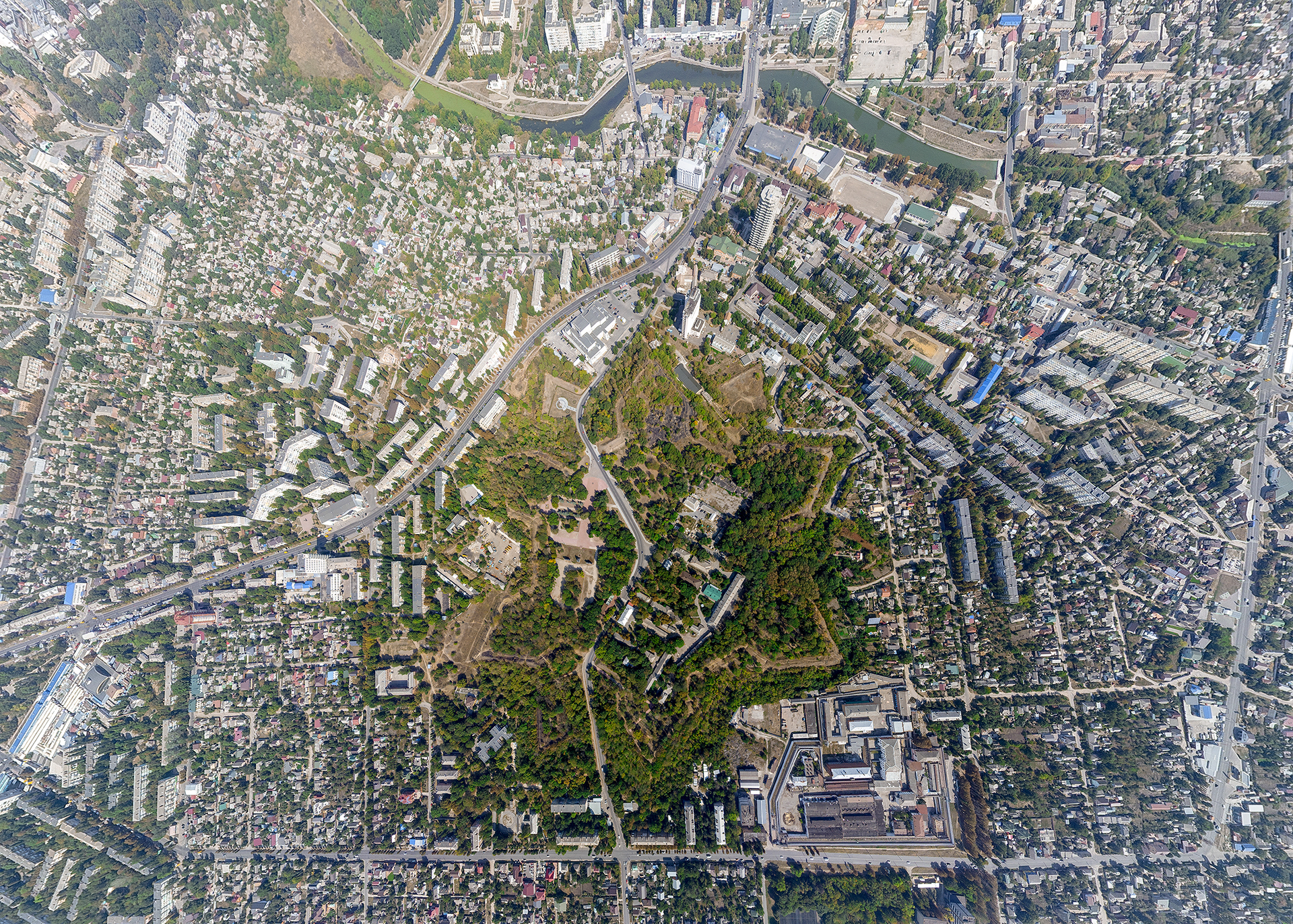
- Modern aerial view

Site information
- Type: earthwork fort
- Owner: public domain
- Condition: ruins

Location
- Location within Ukraine
- Coordinates: 48°29′53″N 32°15′14″E

Site history
- Built: 1754
- Built by: Ivan Glebov, L. Mentselius
- In use: 1754–1775

The Fortress of St. Elizabeth (Ukrainian: Фортеця Святої Єлисавети, also known locally as "earthworks") is a former earthen fortress in the form of a six-pointed star in the city of Kropyvnytskyi in central Ukraine, which became the main symbol of the city.

== History ==
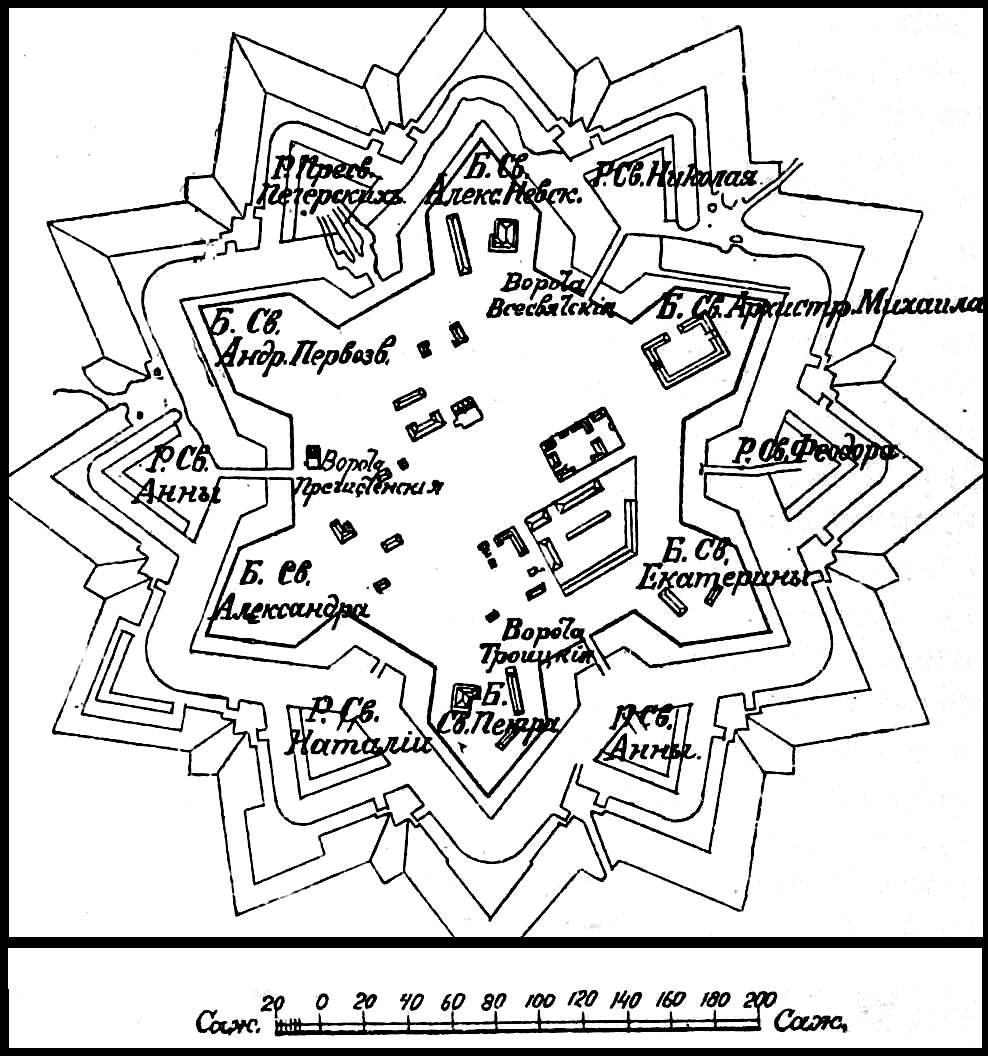
Plan-scheme of the fortress

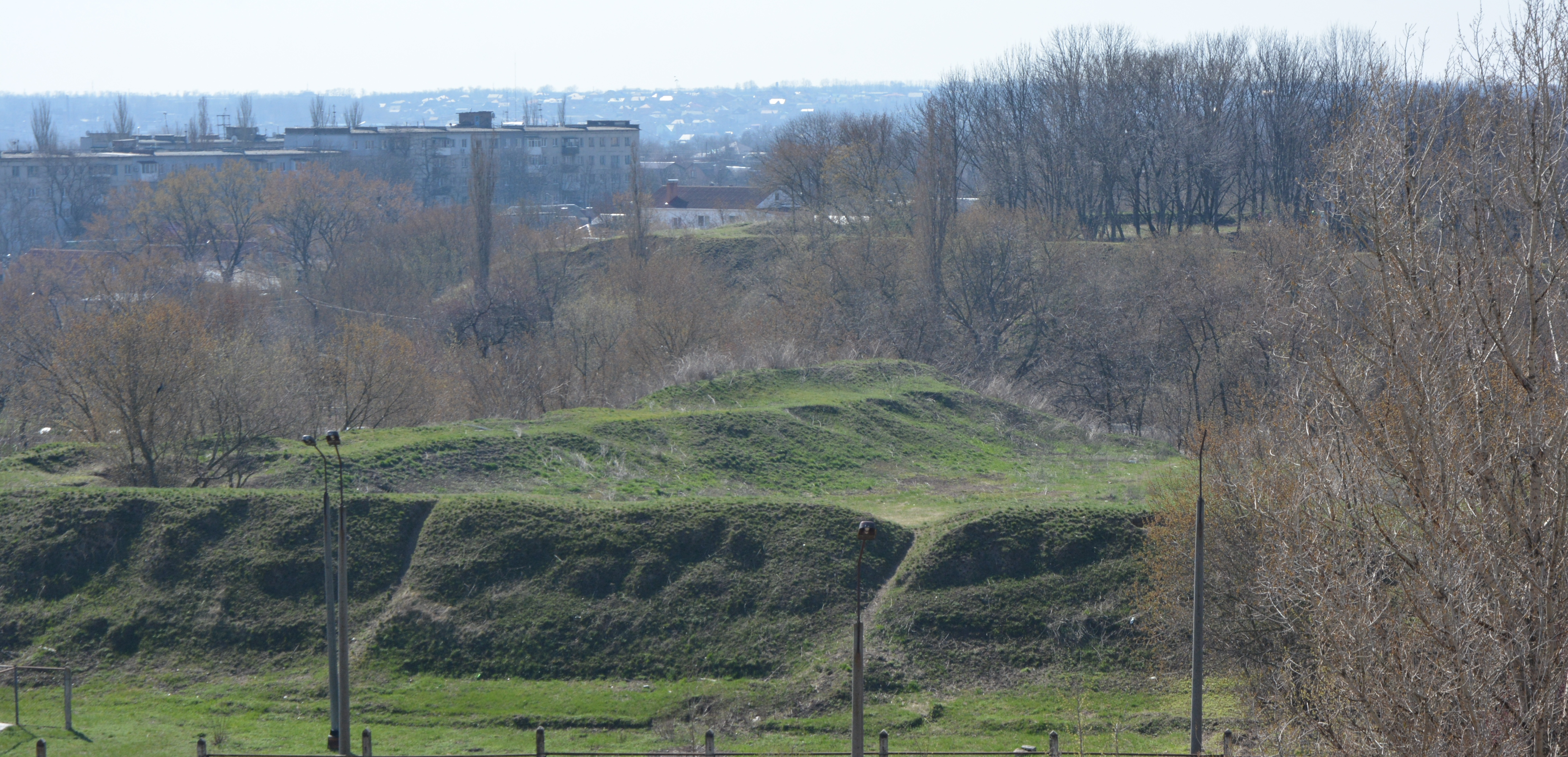
The earthworks

After the formation of New Serbia on the lands of Ukrainian Cossacks, the fortress was created to protect the territories of Serbian settlers from Tatar raids. The fortress of St. Elizabeth was built according to the decree of the Senate, which also created New Serbia. The decree was signed by Empress Elizabeth Petrovna on 4 January 1752. On the basis of the decree, Colonel Ivan Horvat was given a certificate of thanks, and Ivan Glebov received an instruction.

The Hadiach-Myrhorod regiment of Ukrainian Cossacks (1390 males) arrived to build the fortress, which completed the main works in four months: from June 12 to October 1754. During the work, 72 Zaporozhians died, 233 fell ill, and 855 ran away.

The artillery armament of the fortress then consisted of 120 guns, 12 mortars, 6 falconets, 12 howitzers and 6 mortars. In the following years, construction work in the fortress continued, but very slowly and was not finished even until the end of the reign of Empress Elizabeth (1761). A whole city was built on the territory of the fortress, in the center of which stood the wooden Holy Trinity Church, which from 1755 until 1801 it had the status of a cathedral. The soldiers' barracks were designed for 2,200 soldiers. The garrison consisted of three battalions and two teams, artillery and engineering. There were commandant and general's lodgings, religious officials' housing, and powder cellars.

Fortress on the coat of arms of the city

The fortress of St. Elizabeth took part in hostilities only once. This happened during the Russo-Turkish War (1768–1774), the first campaign of which began in 1769 with the invasion of the Crimean khan Qırım Giray to Yelisavetgrad province. On January 4, the 70,000-strong Turkish-Tatar army led by him crossed the border and on January 7 stopped near the St. Elizabeth fortress, in which General Isakov hid with the garrison and local residents. The Crimeans plundered the surrounding villages and enslaved local residents, but the defenders of the city successfully repelled the Tatar attacks and drove the invaders away. This was the last raid of the Crimean Tatars to Ukraine.

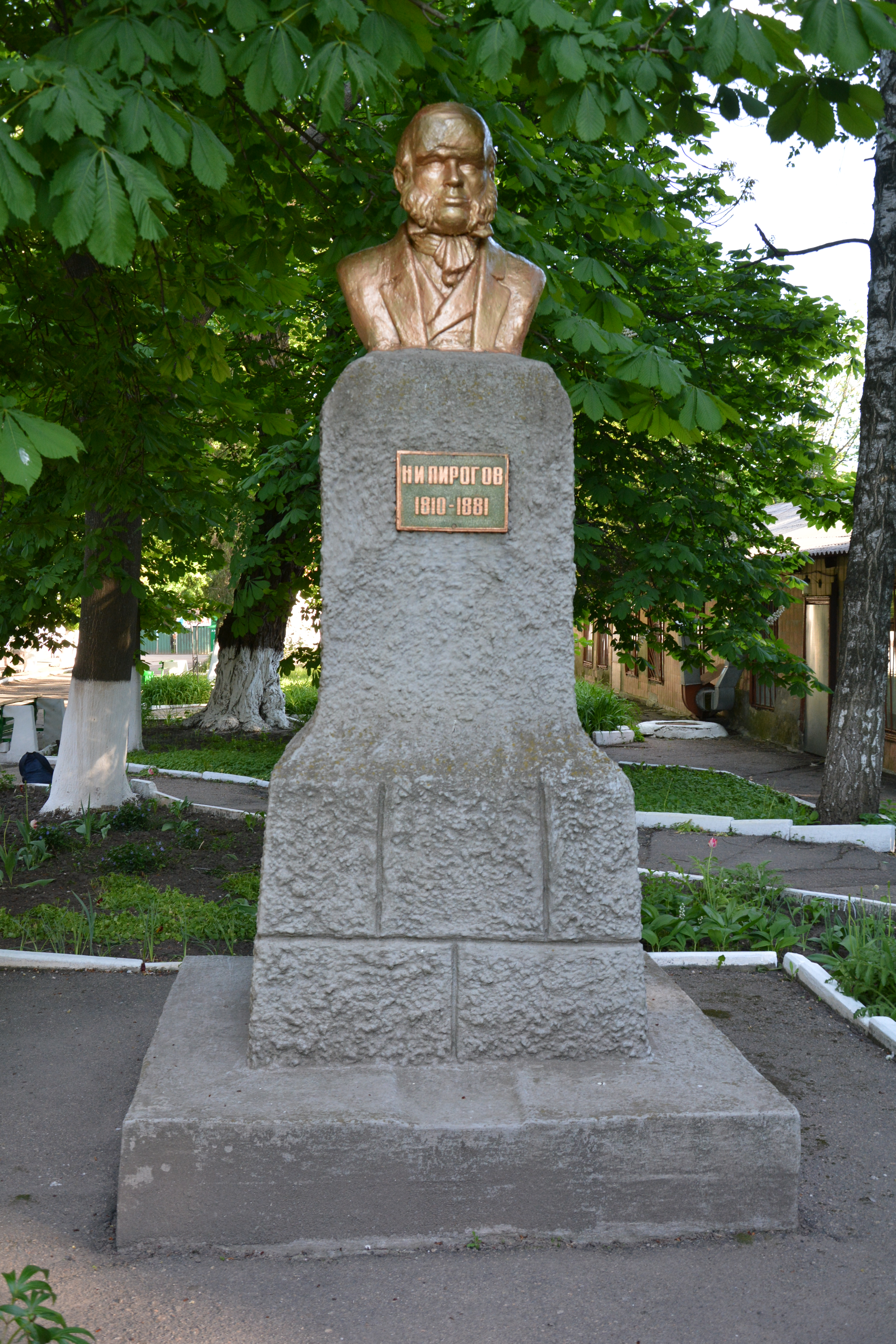
Bust to Nikolai Pirogov

In 1763, a school for officers' children was opened in the fortress. In 1764, the first civilian printing press in Ukraine was founded. Since 1775, the fortress of St. Elizabeth steadily lost its defensive significance, and after the liquidation of Zaporozhian Sich its archive consisting of 30,000 documents regarding Ukrainian Cossacks of the 16–18 centuries was kept in the fortress until they were transported to Kyiv in 1918 during the War of Independence. Also it was from this fortress at the end of May 1775 that 100,000 soldiers under the command of General Peter Tekeli set out for Sich, which was defended by a garrison of 3,000 Ukrainian Cossacks. On June 15, Sich was completely destroyed.

In 1787–1788 Grigory Potemkin founded one of the first medical educational institutions in Ukraine, a medical and surgical school. Yefrem Mukhin (1766–1850) graduated from here and became an outstanding surgeon and one of the teachers of Nikolay Pirogov (1810–1871). Pirogov himself worked in the fortress hospital during the Crimean War of 1853–1856.

In 1784, the fortress began to be liquidated. In 1788 Austrian Field Marshal Charles-Joseph of Ligne visited here and left his memoirs upon his arrival to Europe. In 1794, 162 guns were still kept here, which were serviced by 277 gunners. Cannons and artillery supplies were exported to border towns, mainly Kherson. In April 1795, five cannons were sent to Novomyrhorod. Only two cannons have survived in the former fortress - they are installed on stone pedestals at the entrance from the former main gate.

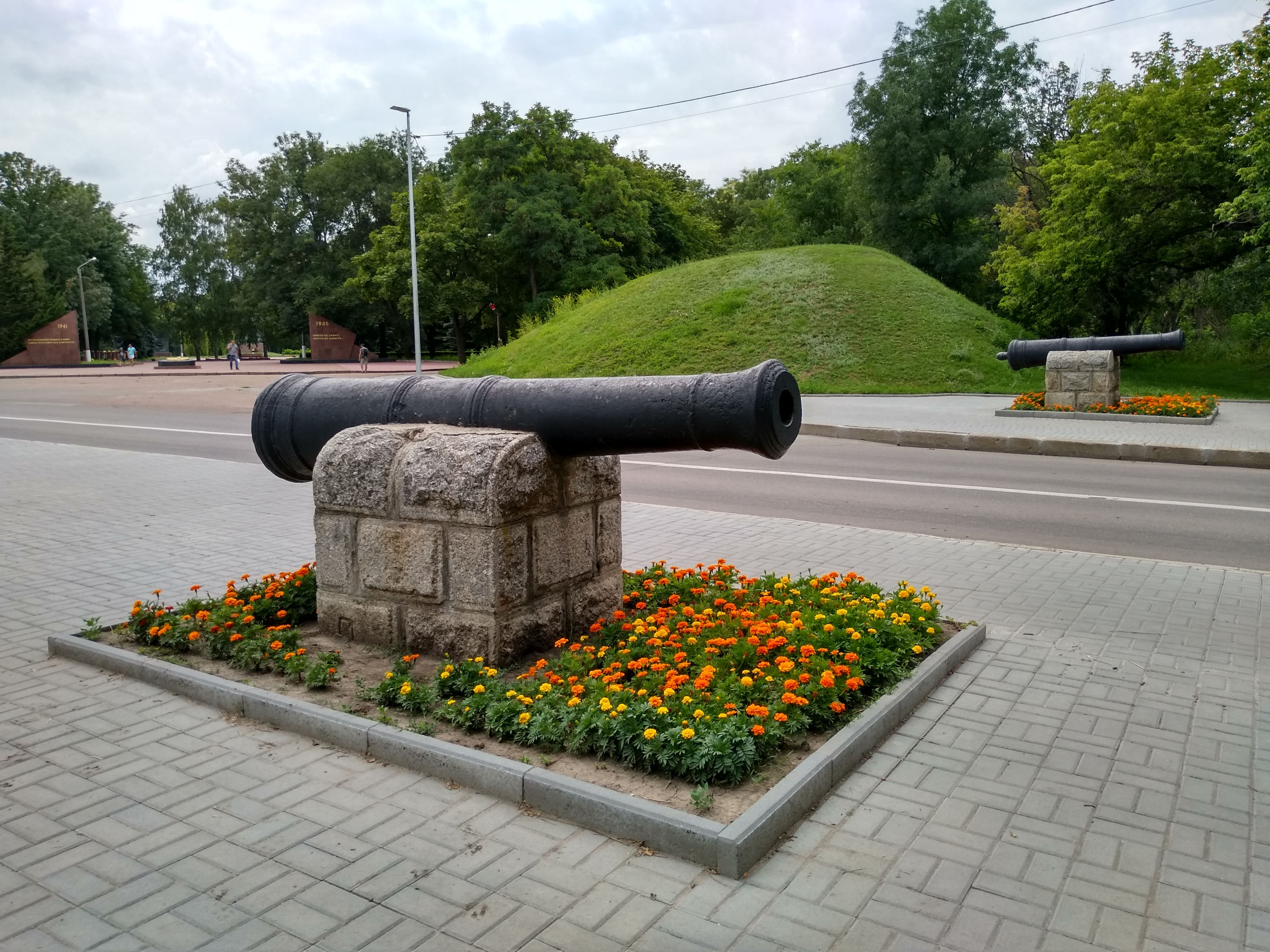
Cannons in the place where the main entrance was

The complete cancellation of the status of the fortress took place on 15 March 1805. The fortress garrison was disbanded, but the barracks housed a battalion (three companies) for many years. The outline of the fortress became the coat of arms of the city.

On 26 January 1837, Georgi Emmanuel, a participant in the War of 1812 and a famous commander of Serbian origin, was buried 3 kilometers from the fortress (today Sanatorny Lane). On 17 September 1842, Russian Emperor Nicholas I arrived at the fortress for a military parade, in 1874 Alexander II, and in 1888 Alexander III. On 24 January 1917, Princess Helen of Serbia visited the fortress. Her Royal Highness was elected the head of the Yelisavetgrad Committee for the Care of Serbian Refugees, as more than 1,000 of them lived in the city at that time.

During the Ukrainian–Soviet War, the Bolsheviks created a prison here for political opponents, primarily for the ottomans of the Ukrainian People's Republic and Kholodny Yar Republic (Yuriy Gorlis-Gorsky was imprisoned here in 1922). On 24 September 1922, after a speech at a meeting of local communists in which he called for the Red Terror, Mikhail Frunze visited the fortress.

During the Holodomor of 1932–1933 and Great Purge, employees of OGPU and NKVD secretly transported those killed and tortured to the fortress grounds, burying their corpses in mass graves. During the years of stagnation, dissidents from all over the Kirovograd oblast were tortured here in the local hospital.

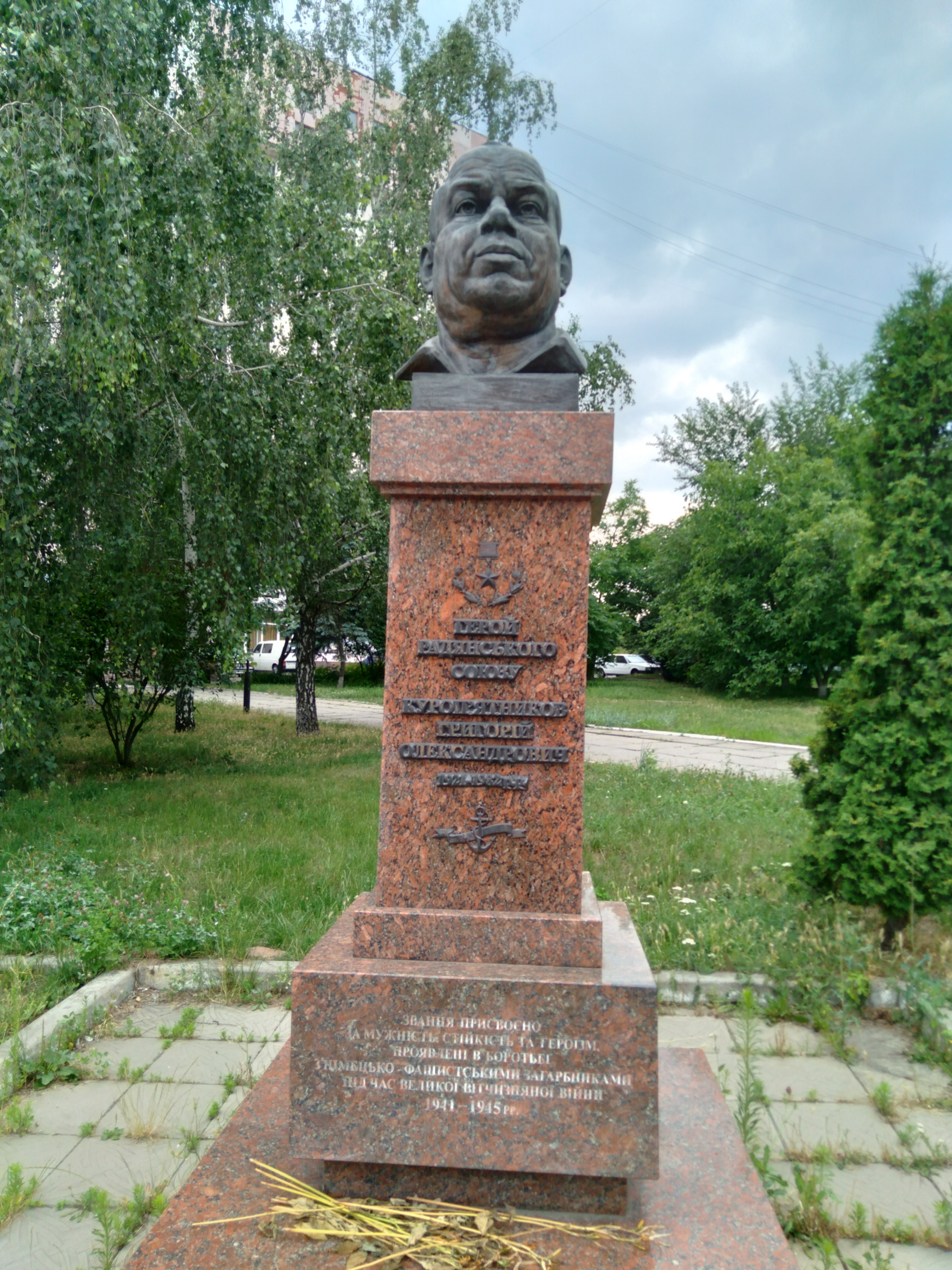
Bust to the NKVD border guard and Hero of the Soviet Union Hryhoriy Kuropyatnykov (1921–1982)

On the territory of the former fortress there are two hospitals since 1800, a 1950’s memorial complex dedicated to the Soviet military's "Pantheon of Eternal Glory" (a gravesite for Heroes of the Soviet Union), an Alley of Memory dedicated to the warriors of the Russo-Ukrainian War since 2014, and the Portal cinema. Also in 2016, a memorial to the victims of the Holodomor was installed to commemorate the city's loss of 2,238 residents from 1932–1933.

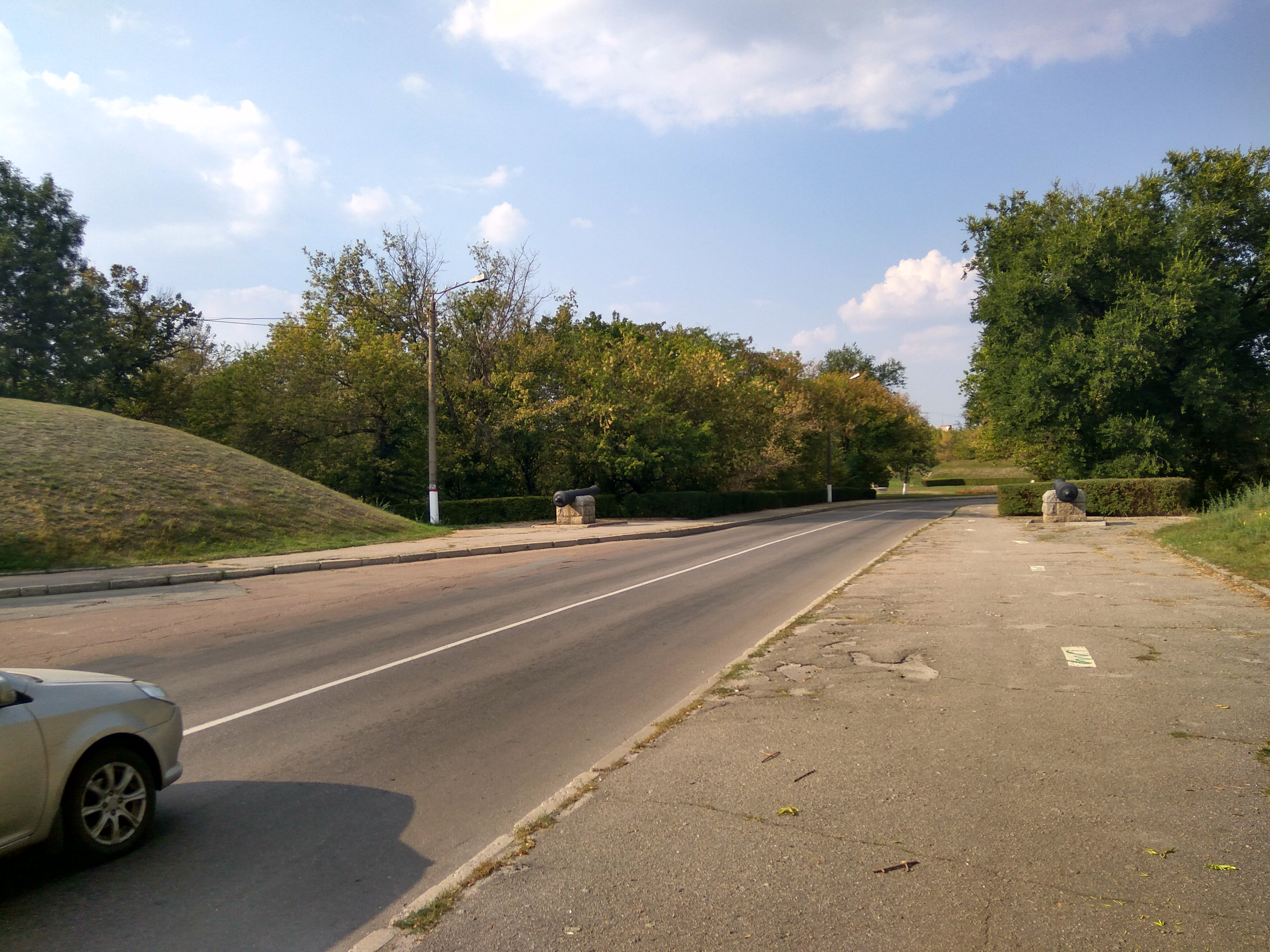
Place of the former main gate from the inner side

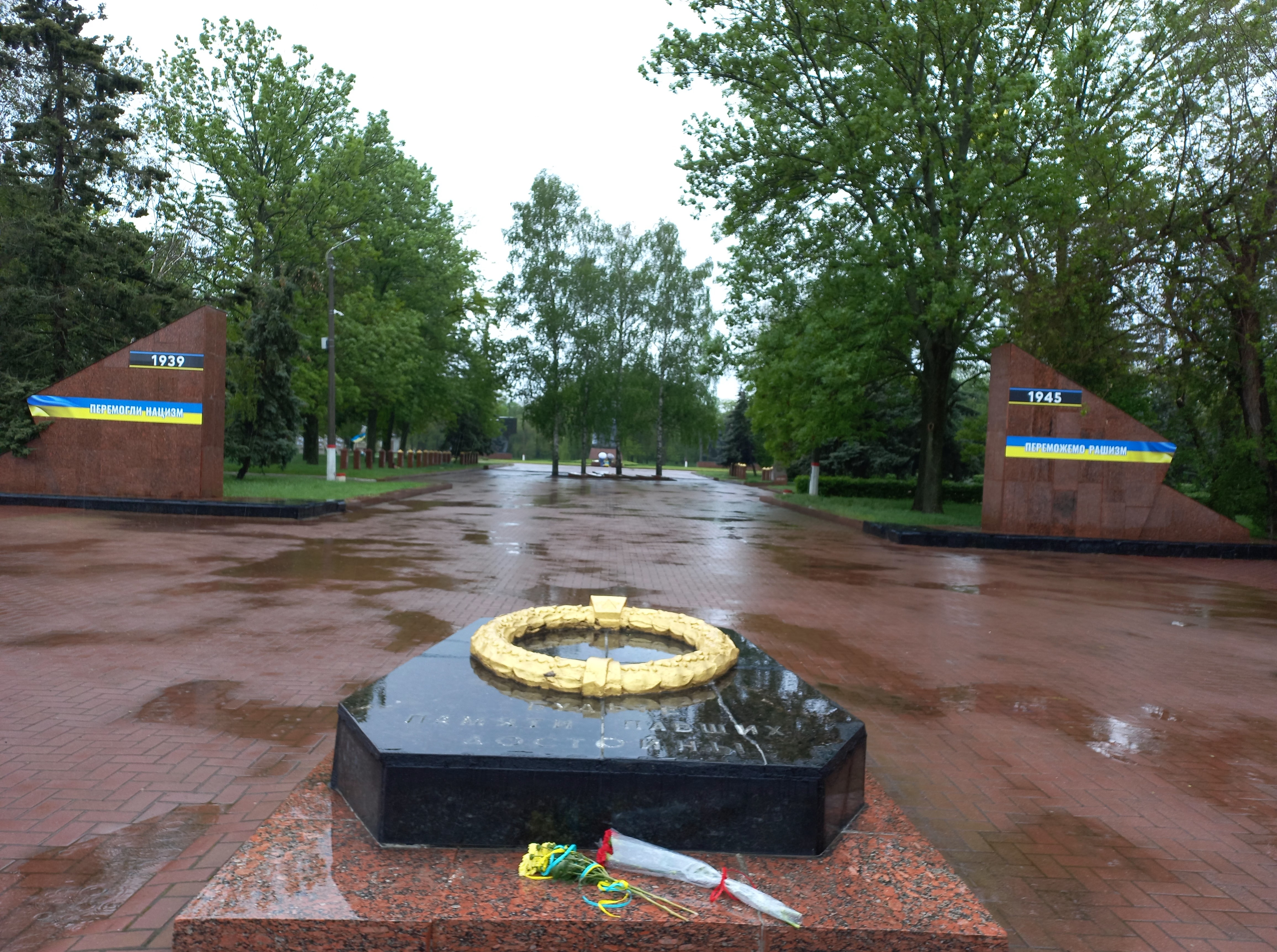
Entrance to the Pantheon of Eternal Glory military cemetery (inscription: The World defeated the Nazism - so Ruscism will also be defeated)

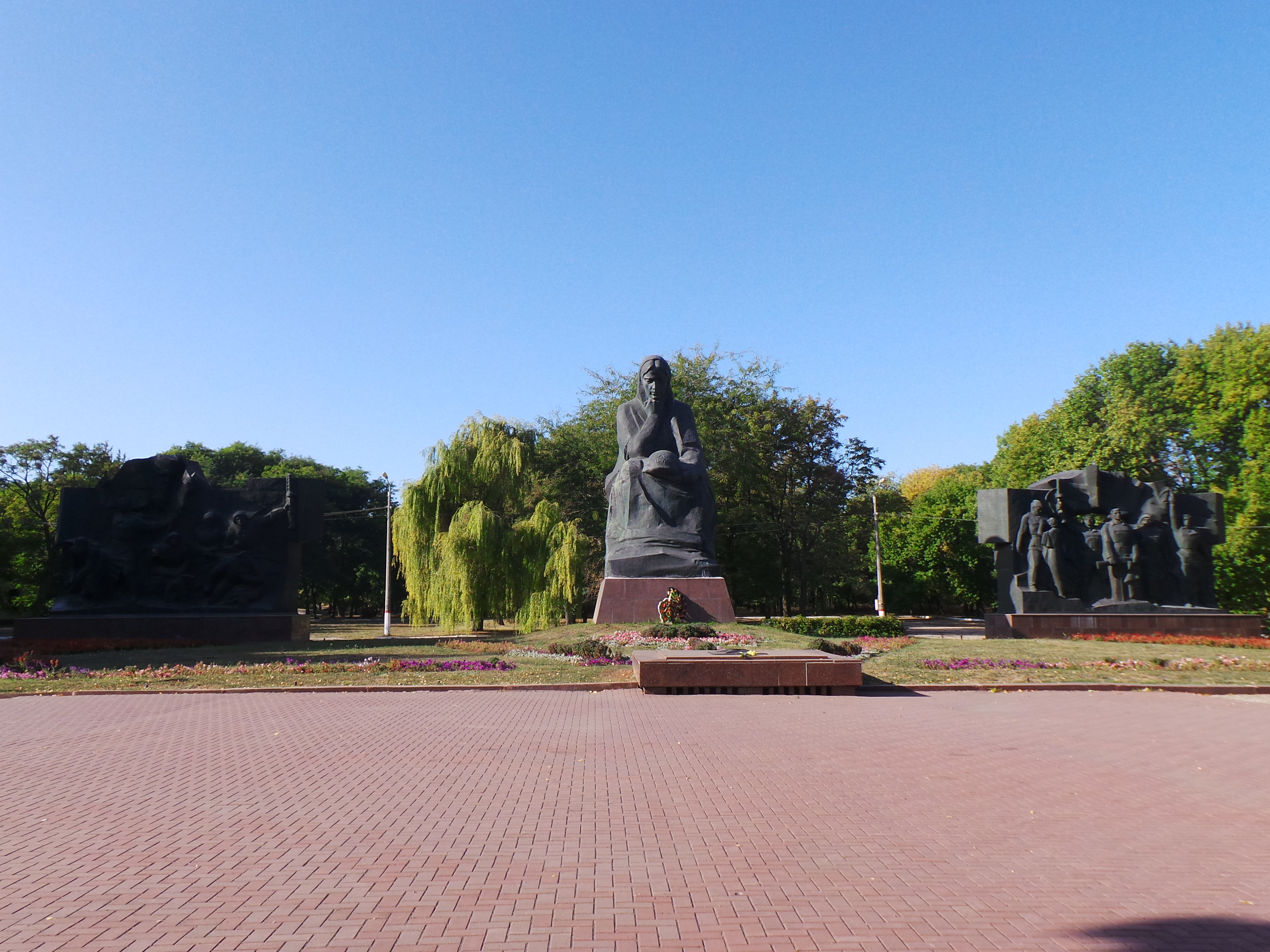
Monuments

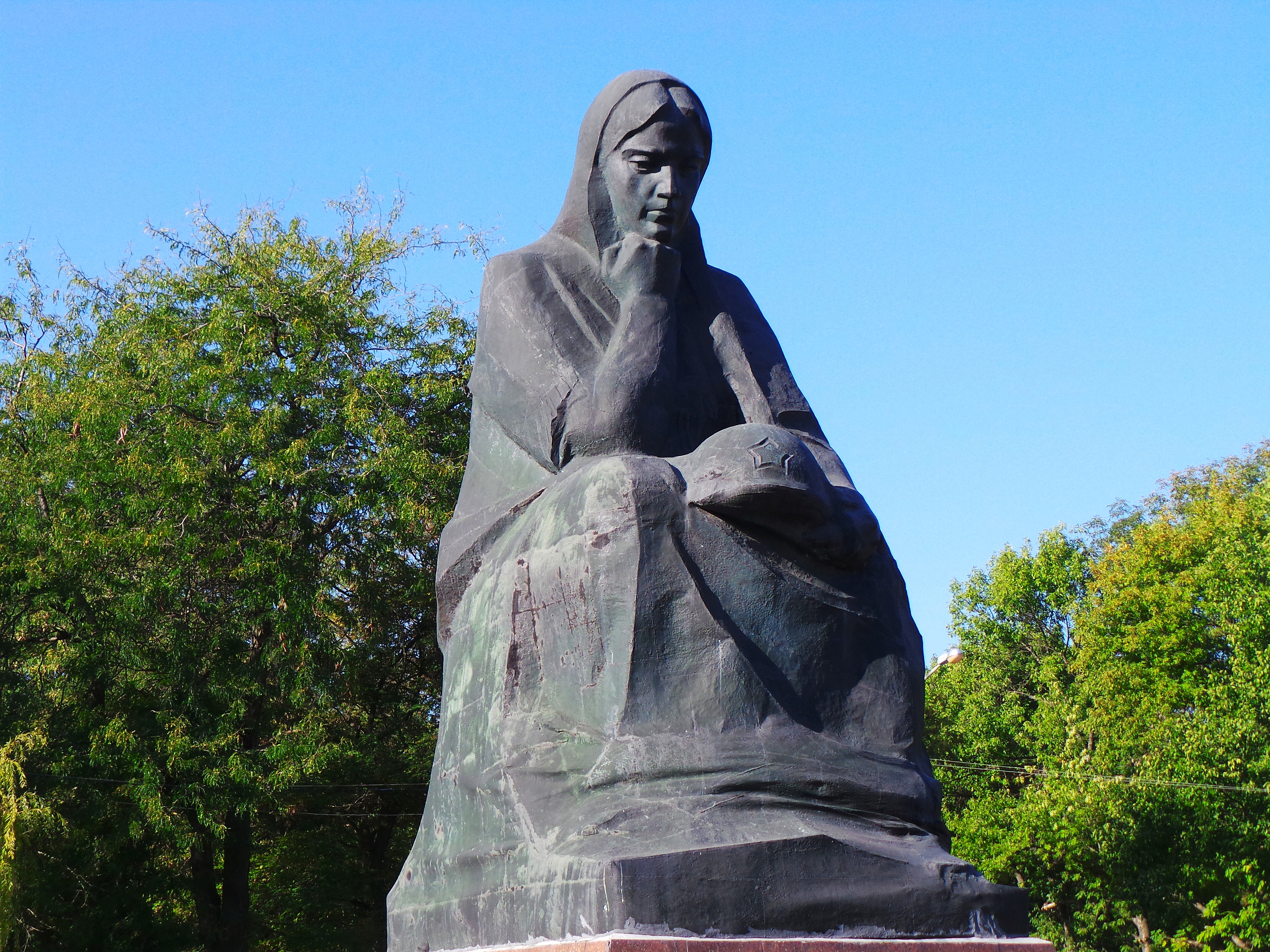
"Grieving Motherland" Monument

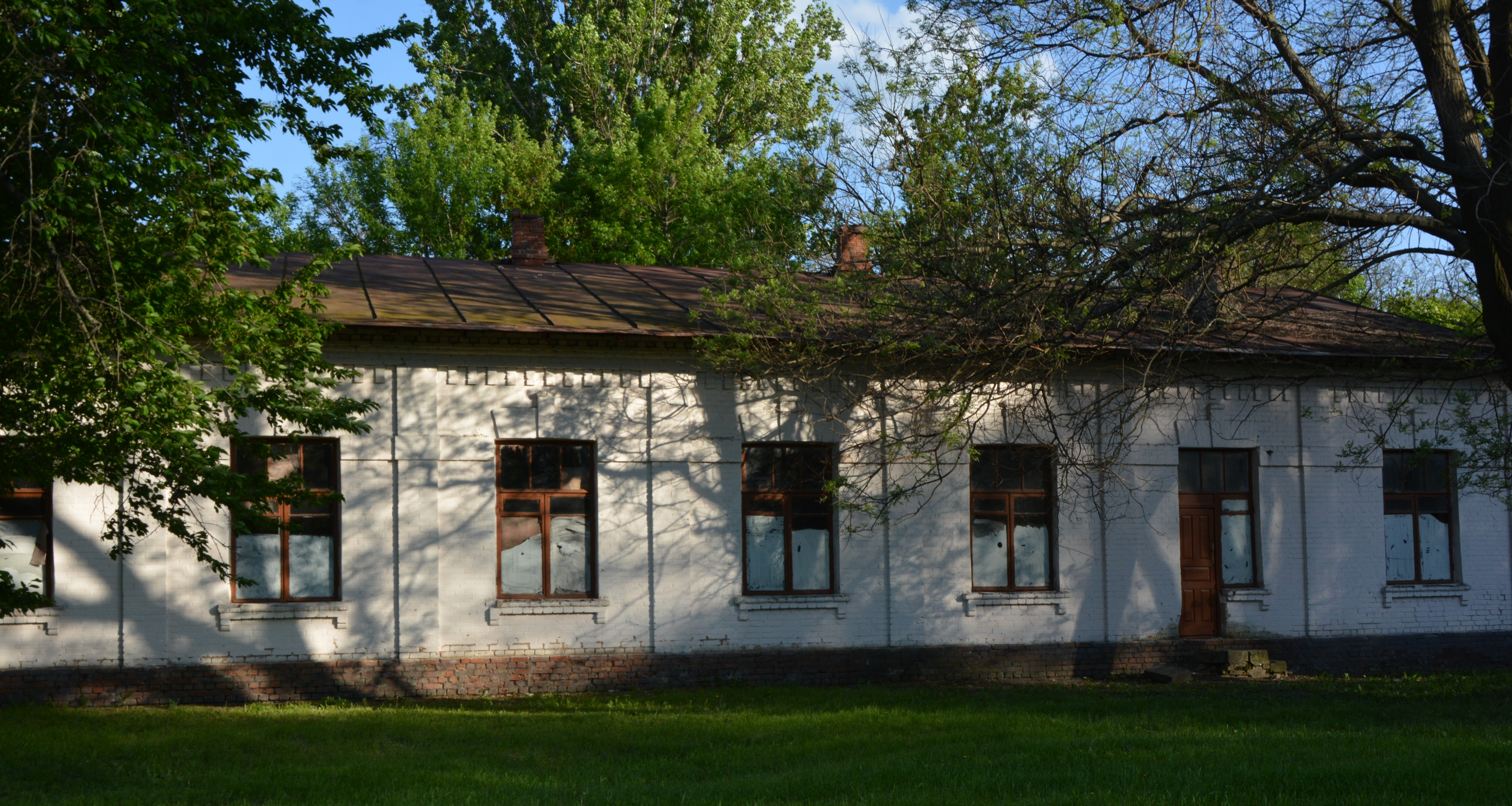
Medical building

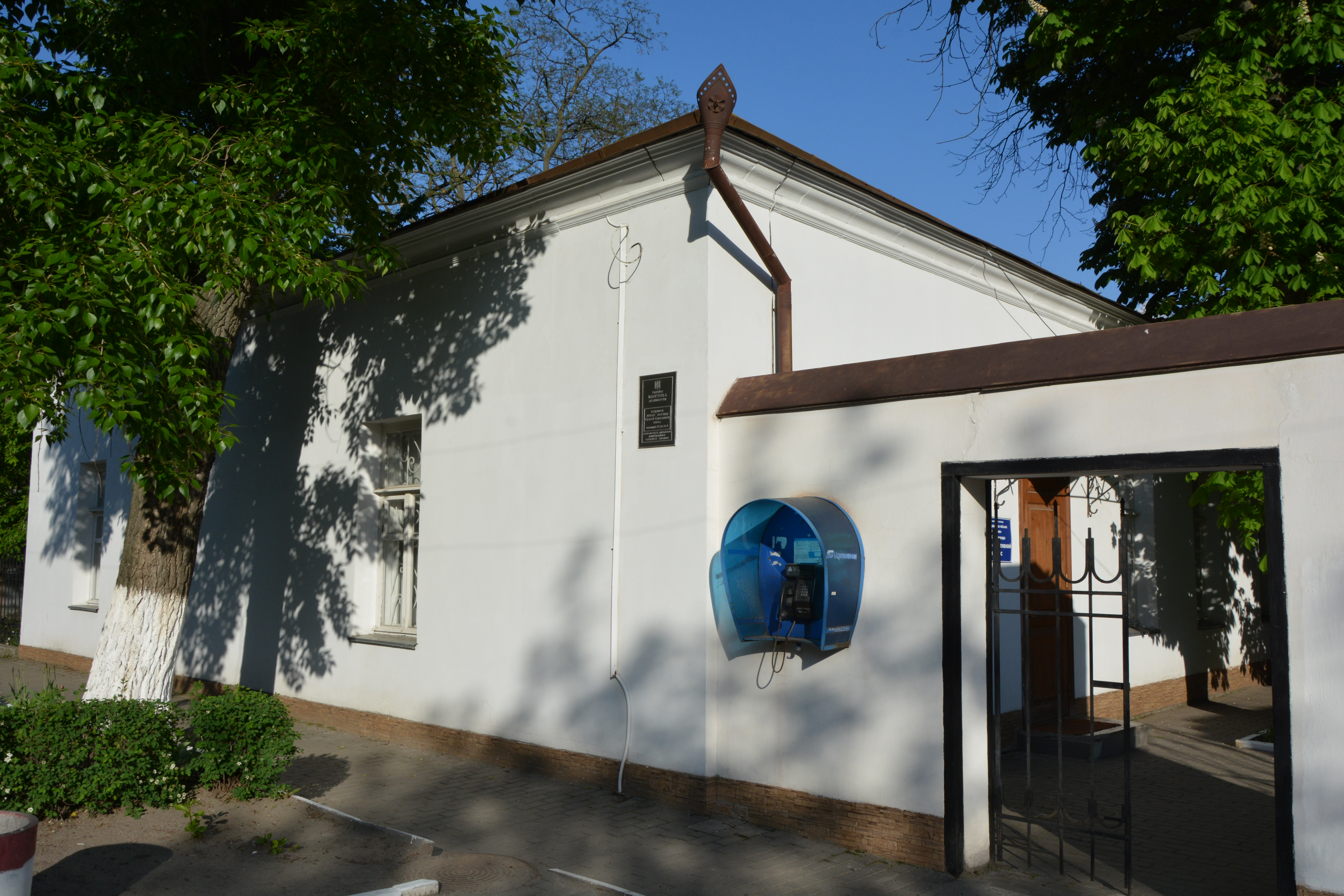
Headquarters of the fortress

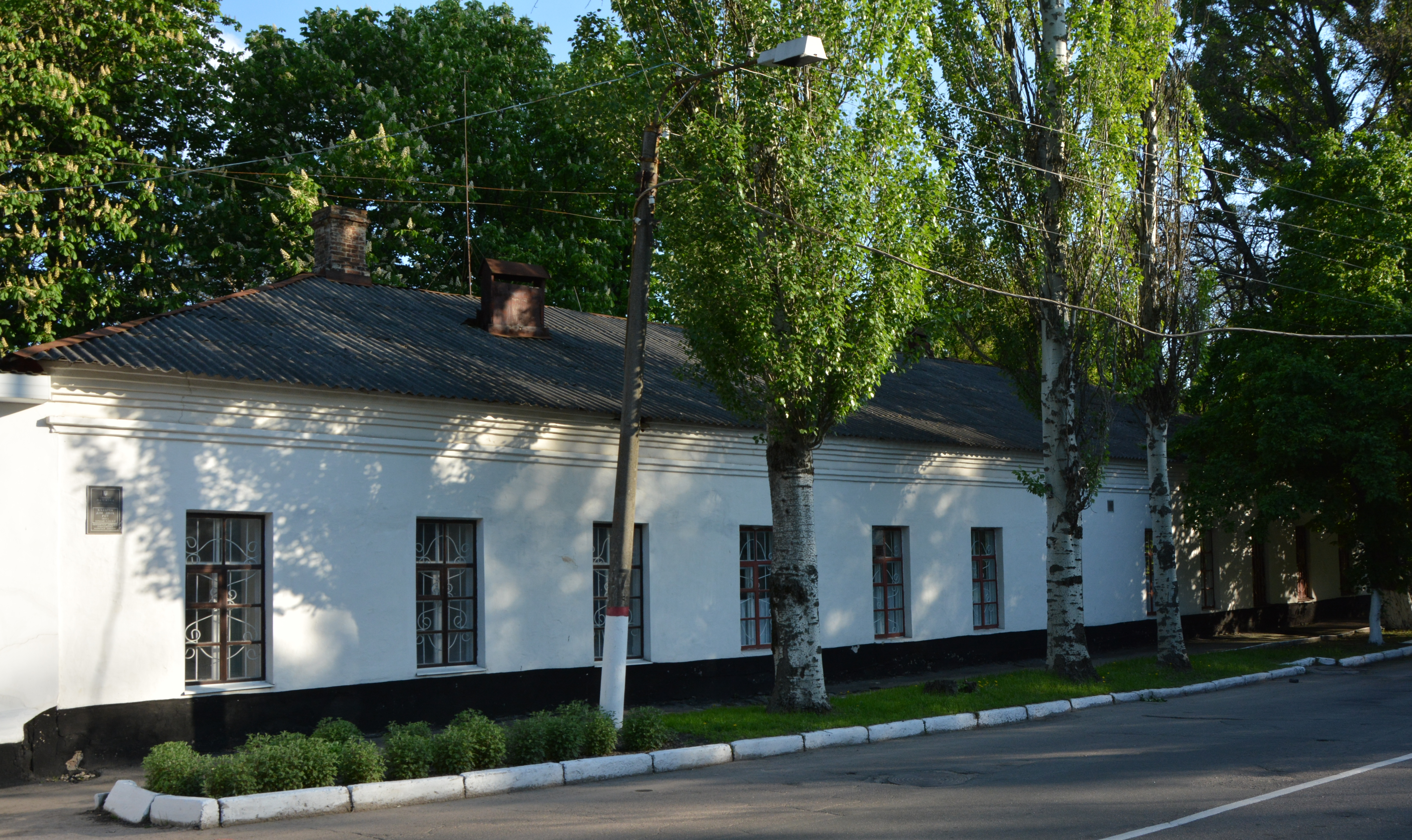
Barracks for companies

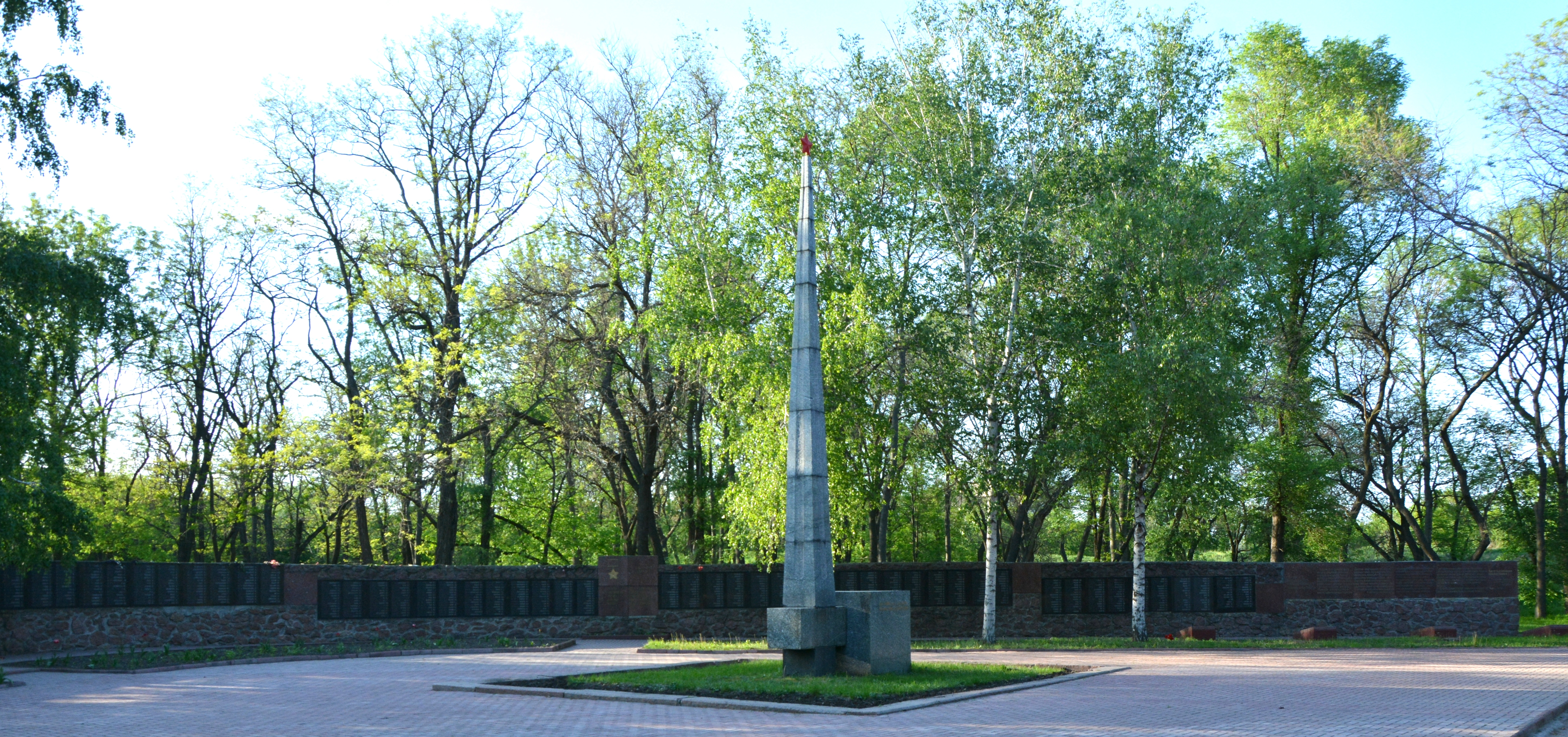
Alley of Memory

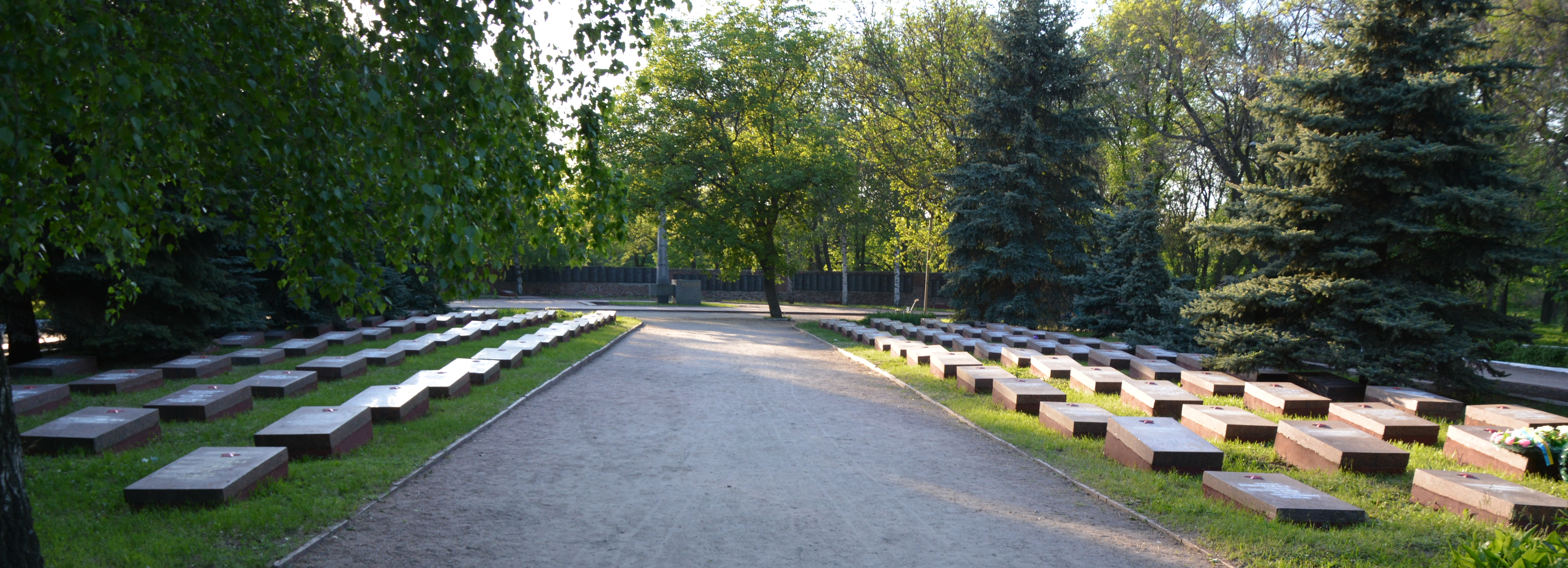
Graves of those who died in the battles of the 2nd Ukrainian Front

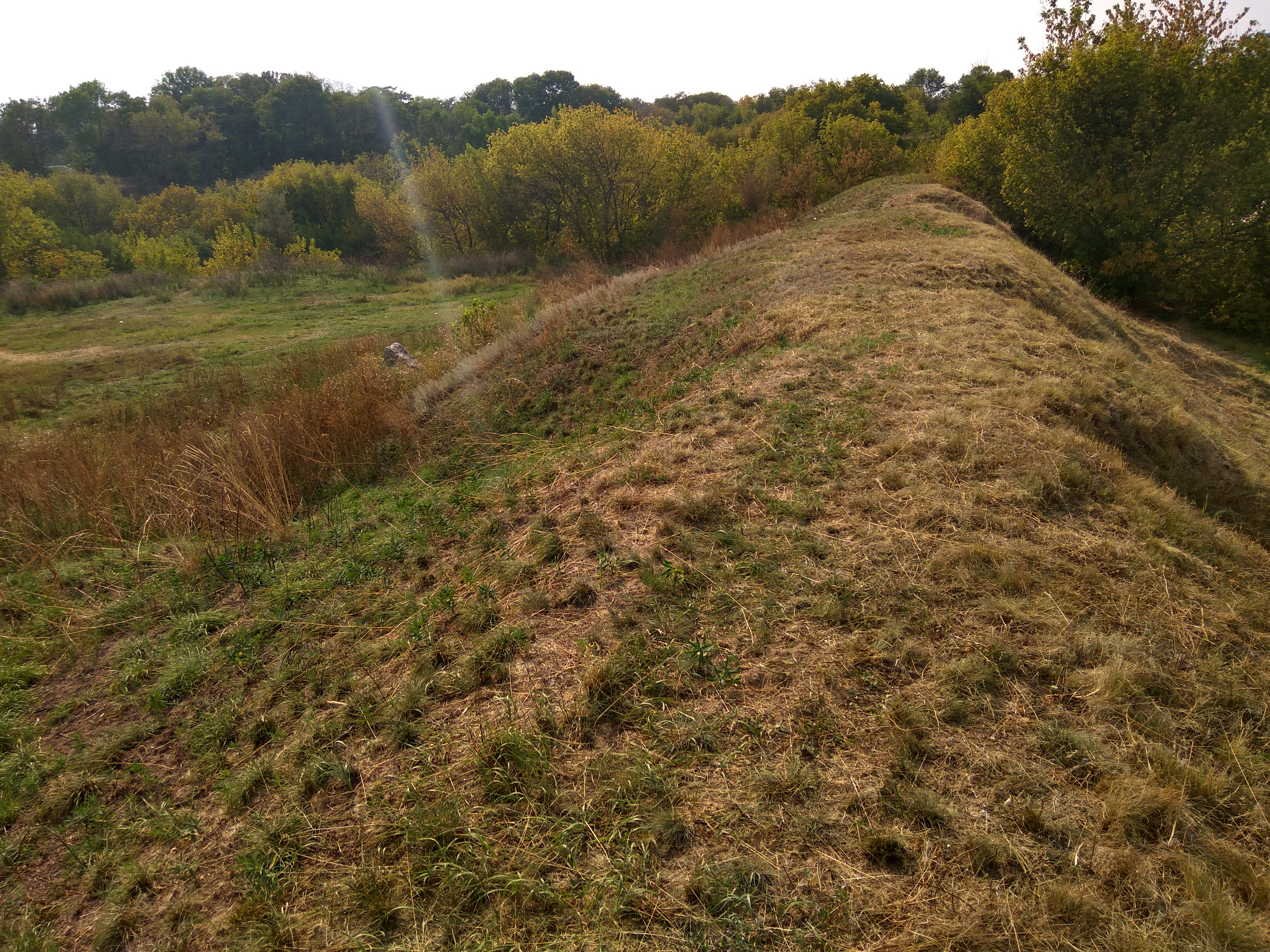
Remains of earthworks

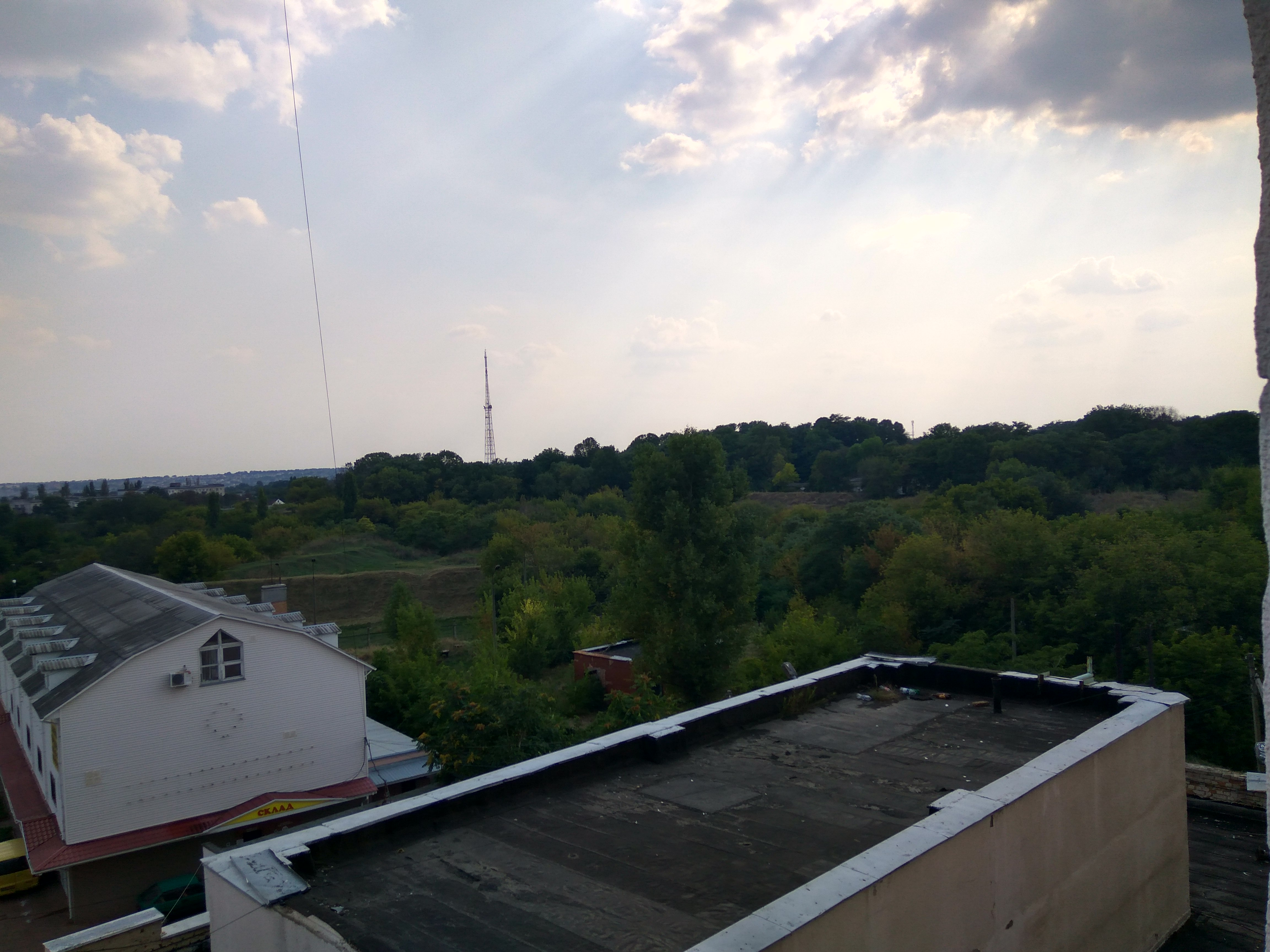
View from above

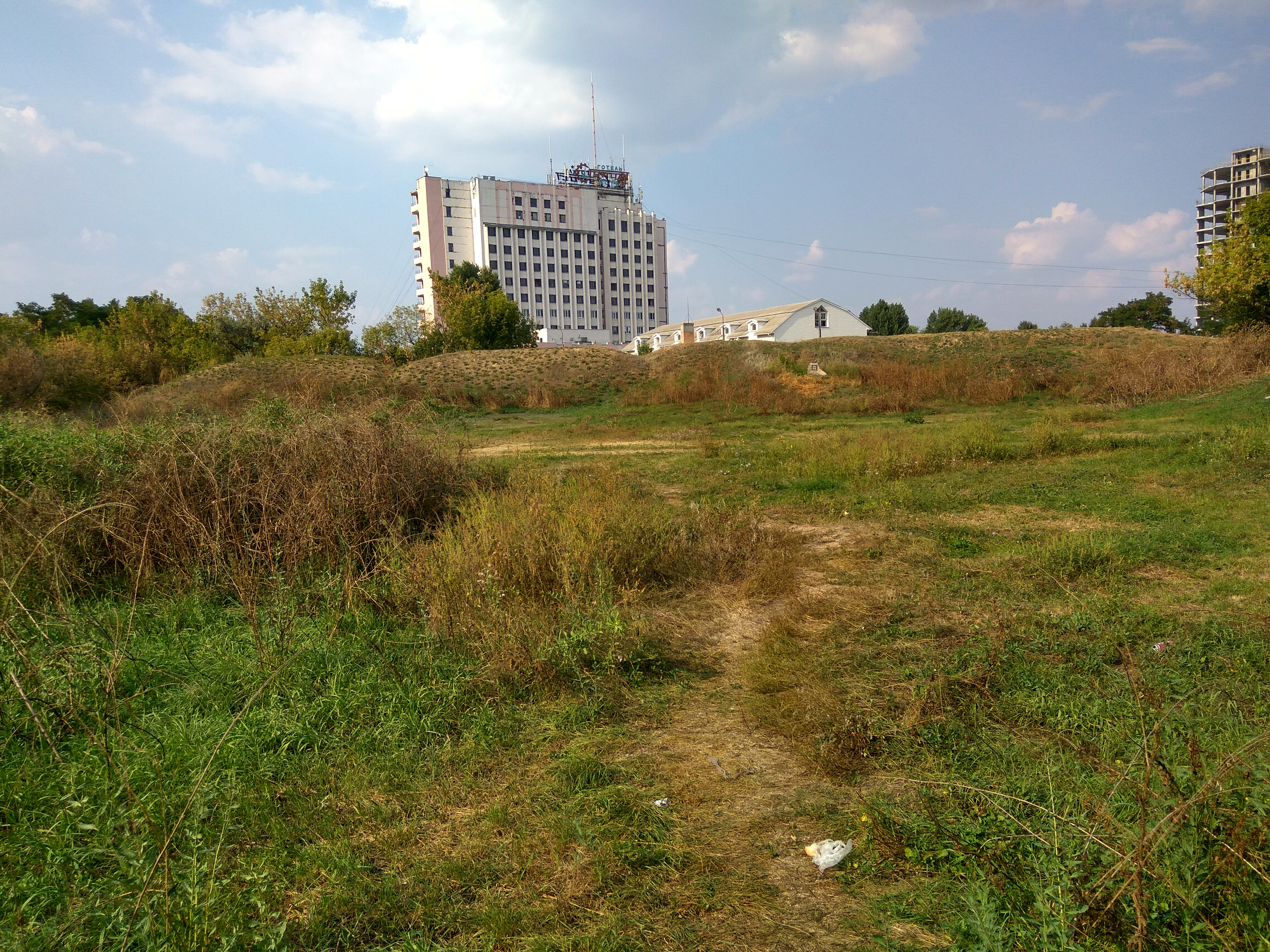
Northern part of the earthworks

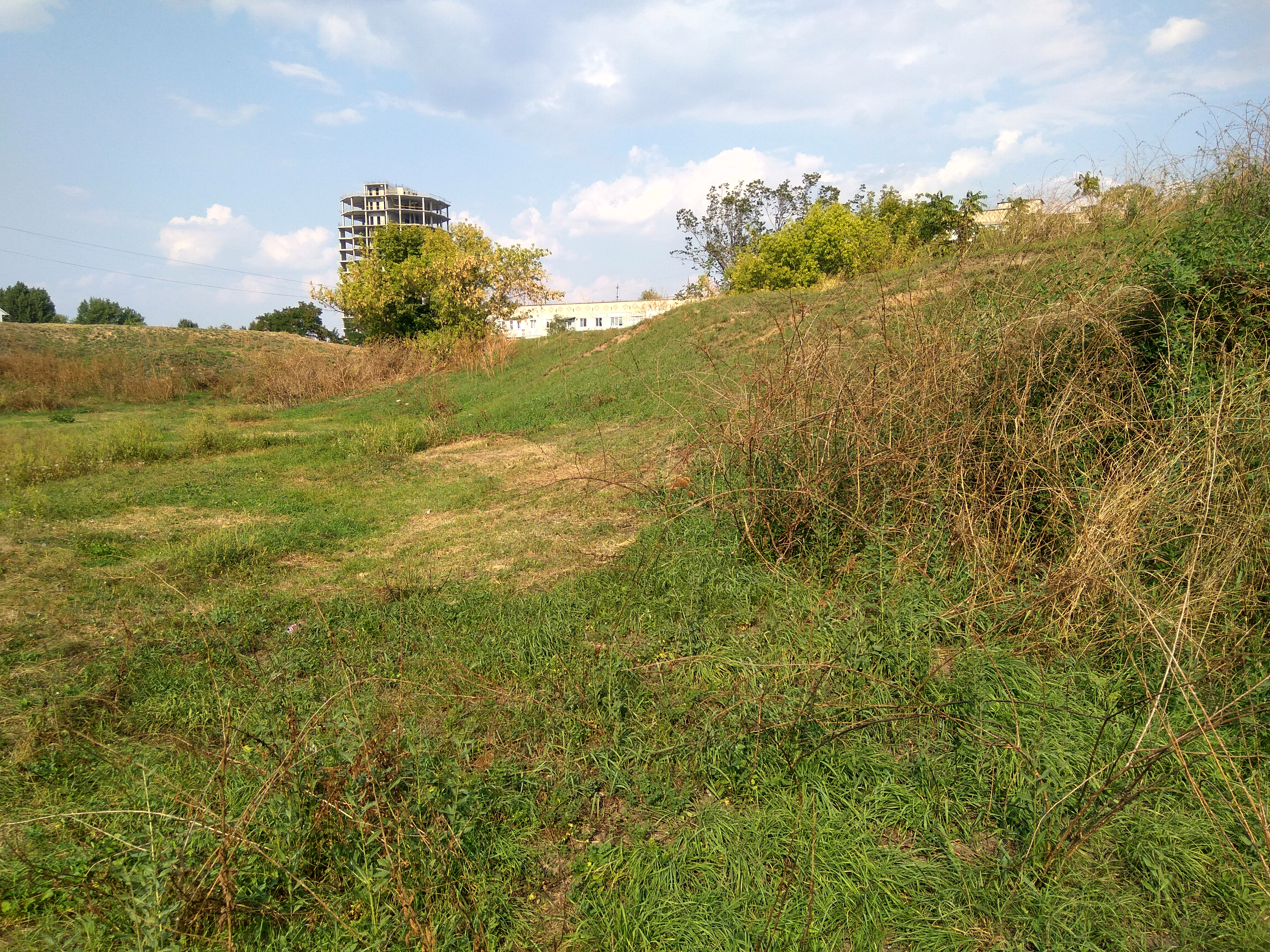
Eastern part

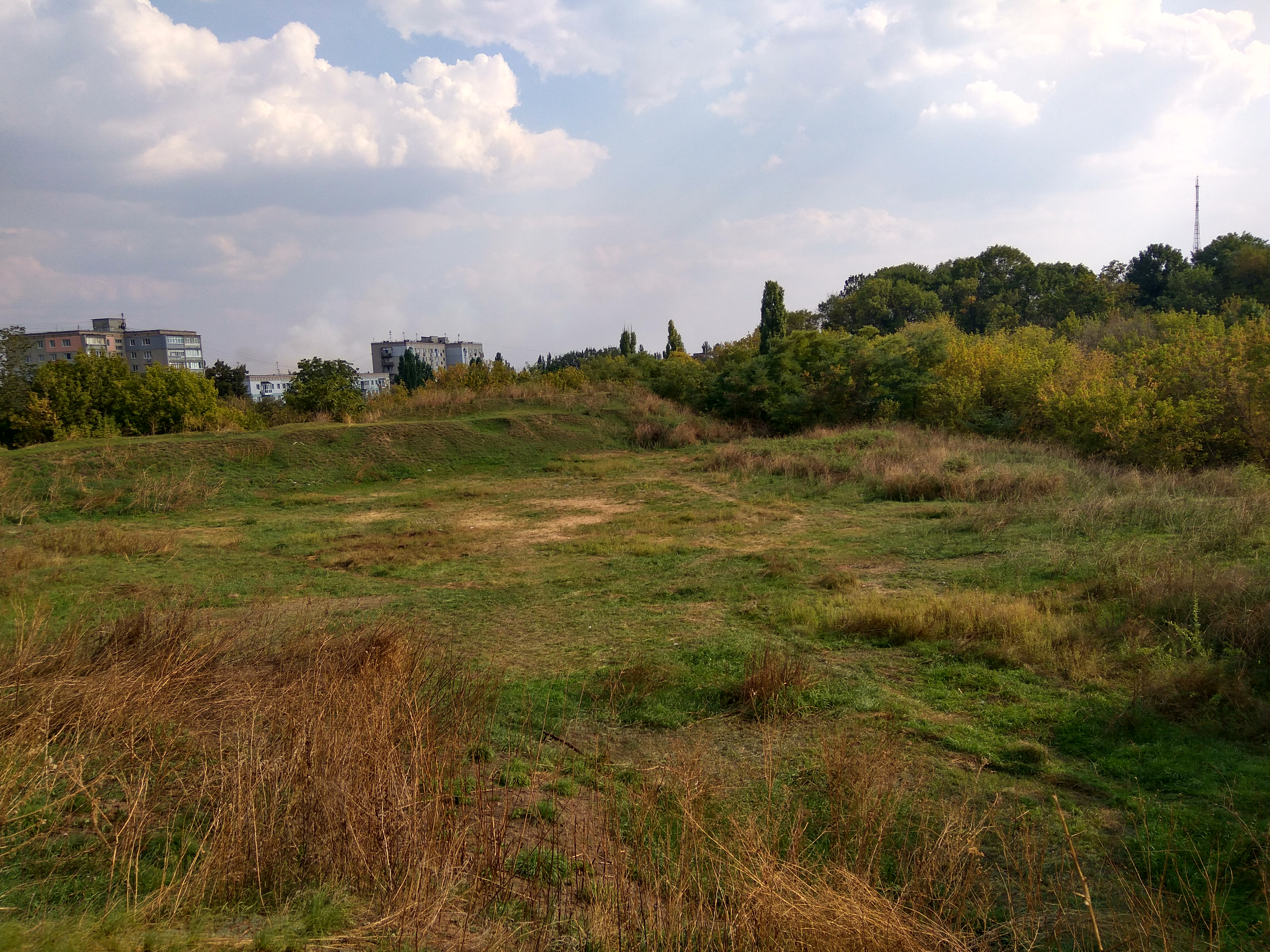
Western part

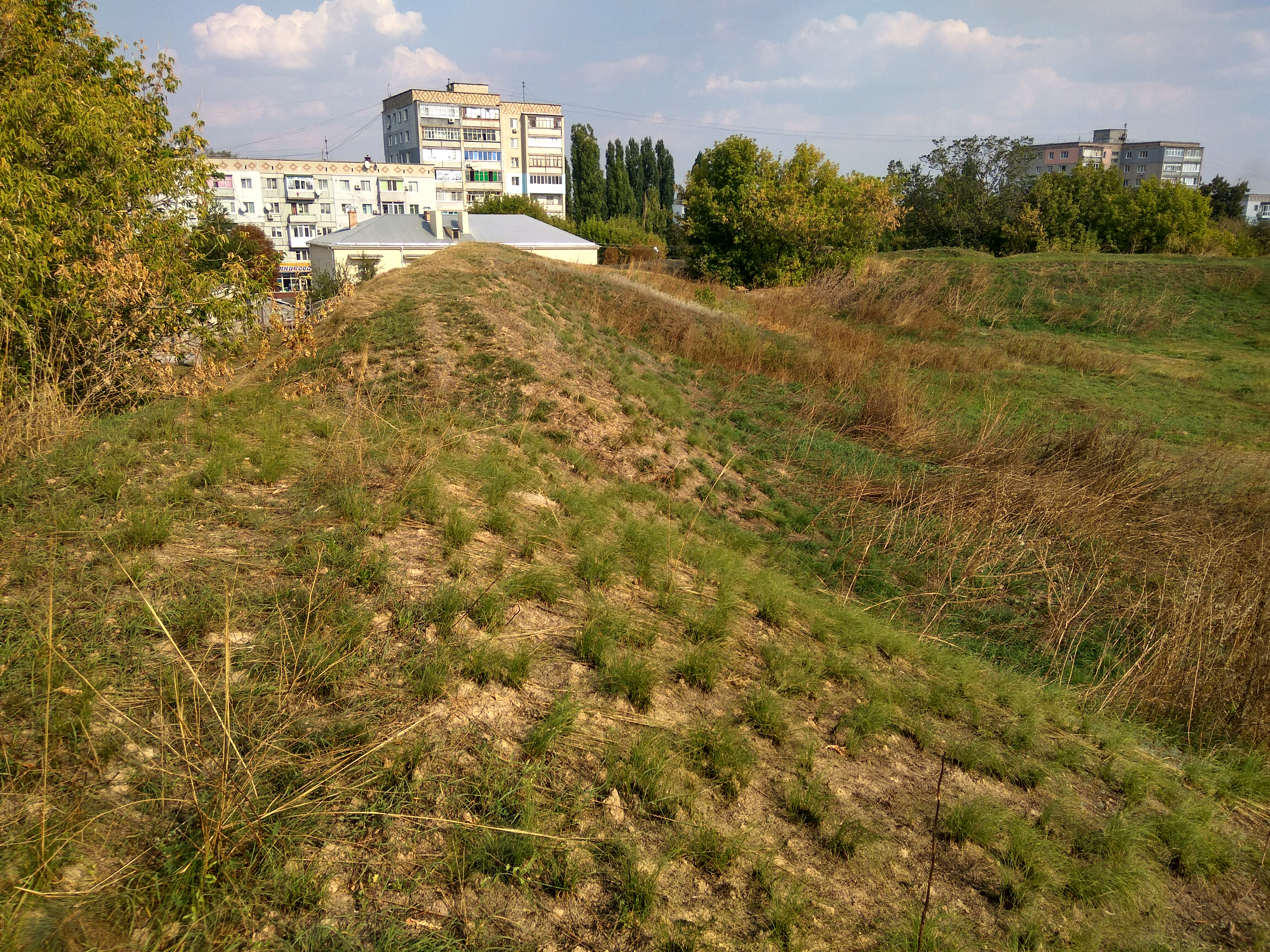
Southern part

Today, 85% of the fortress buildings have been preserved, including all the bastions, most of the ravelins, escarpments, curtains, and glacis, but they are very neglected and need serious restoration. To prevent their disappearance over time and turn it into a popular tourist attraction, there have been regular proposals to concrete them, though none have yet been considered by local government.

== See also ==
- Petrivska fortress (Ukraine)

== Sources ==
- Соколов Г. И. Историческая и статистическая записка о военном городе Елисаветграде // Записки Одесского общества истории и древностей. — Т. 2. — 1848. — С. 386–395;
- Українське козацтво: Мала енциклопедія. — Київ; Запоріжжя, 2005.
- Архів фортеці Єлисавети в ІР НБУВ / Інгульський степ, альманах. К. 2016.
