= St. Catherine's Cathedral, Kherson =

Cathedral of St. Catherine
- Свято-Катерининський собор
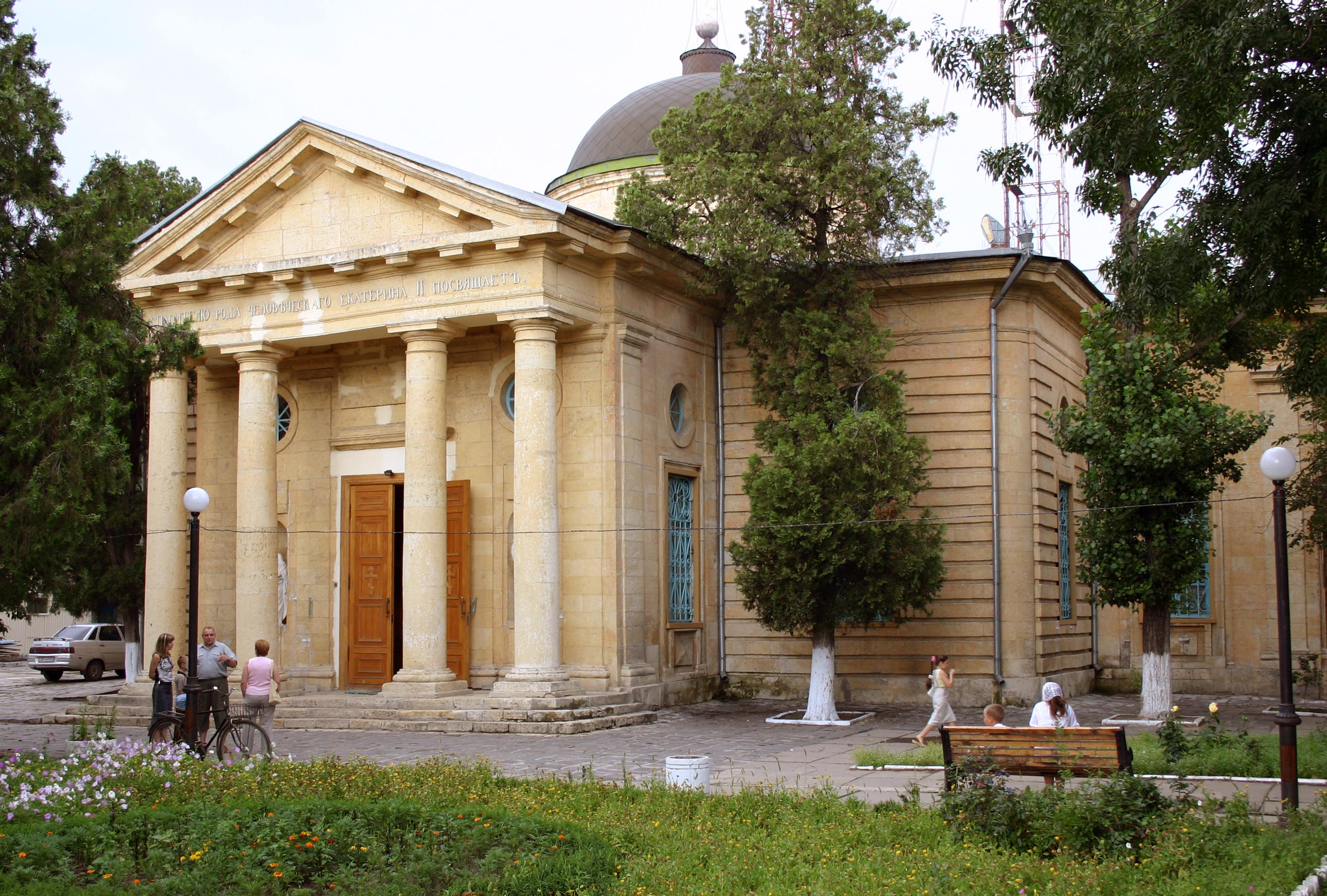
- Cathedral of St. Catherine
- Location: Kherson
- Country: Ukraine
- Denomination: Eastern Orthodox Church

Architecture
- Architect: Ivan Starov
- Style: Russian Neoclassicism
- Years built: 1781–1786

Administration
- Diocese: Kherson diocese

The Cathedral of St. Catherine (Ukrainian: Свято-Катериненський собор; Russian: Свято-Екатерининский собор) is a religious building belonging to the Orthodox faith that is situated within the Kherson fortress, in the city of Kherson, Ukraine. It was built in 1781–1786, one of the earliest churches in New Russia. It is a domed sandstone structure with a Tuscan portico and heavily rusticated walls. The church was dedicated to Catherine of Alexandria, the patron saint of the reigning empress.

== Construction ==
The church was built by order of General Ivan Gannibal in the aftermath of the Russo-Turkish War and Russia's annexation of New Russia. It was intended as a memorial to the war of conquest and is full of symbolism illustrating Russia's claims to the Byzantine heritage. The architect is thought to have been Ivan Starov (who worked extensively for Prince Grigory Potemkin); but the actual construction was supervised by the little-known Ivan Sitnikov.

On December 6, 1788, by order of Potemkin bodies of soldiers killed during the Siege of Ochakov were buried in the church's cemetery.

The earliest description of the church is found in the diary of Francisco de Miranda. In 1790, Prince Potemkin asked Starov to remodel the dome in imitation of his own palace in Saint Petersburg. The belfry was added in 1800 but was dismantled within several years, after an earthquake. After Potemkin's death he was buried in the cathedral, as was Prince Charles Frederick Henry of Württemberg, Maria Feodorovna's brother.

The cathedral's icons were patterned after the Hermitage paintings by the 17th century Spanish artists such as Murillo. Vladimir Borovikovsky may have had a hand in their creation. The walls contain the copies of six life size figures of the apostles and saints executed by Gavrila Zamorayev from Moscow (1758-1823).

== 20th century–present ==
After the Russian Revolution, the church was turned into a museum of atheism. Most icons were lost, only a few ended up in the collection of a local art museum. The church was reopened by the invading Germans in 1941, only to be shut down in 1962 during Nikita Khrushchev's anti-religious campaign. The building was used as a facility for log storage. The Neoclassical belfry, dating from about 1806, was torn down. It was not until 1991 that the Ukrainian Orthodox Church reclaimed the grounds.

On 26 October 2022, Vladimir Saldo, collaborator and Russian-appointed acting "governor" of Kherson Oblast under the Russian occupation of 2022, announced that Prince Grigory Potemkin's remains were taken from his tomb and transported to Russia.

On 3 August 2023, the cathedral was damaged by Russian shelling. Eight people were wounded in the attack.

On 20 December 2024, the cathedral was once again struck by Russian shelling, damaging the cathedral's dome and interior.

== Gallery ==
Potemkin's tomb

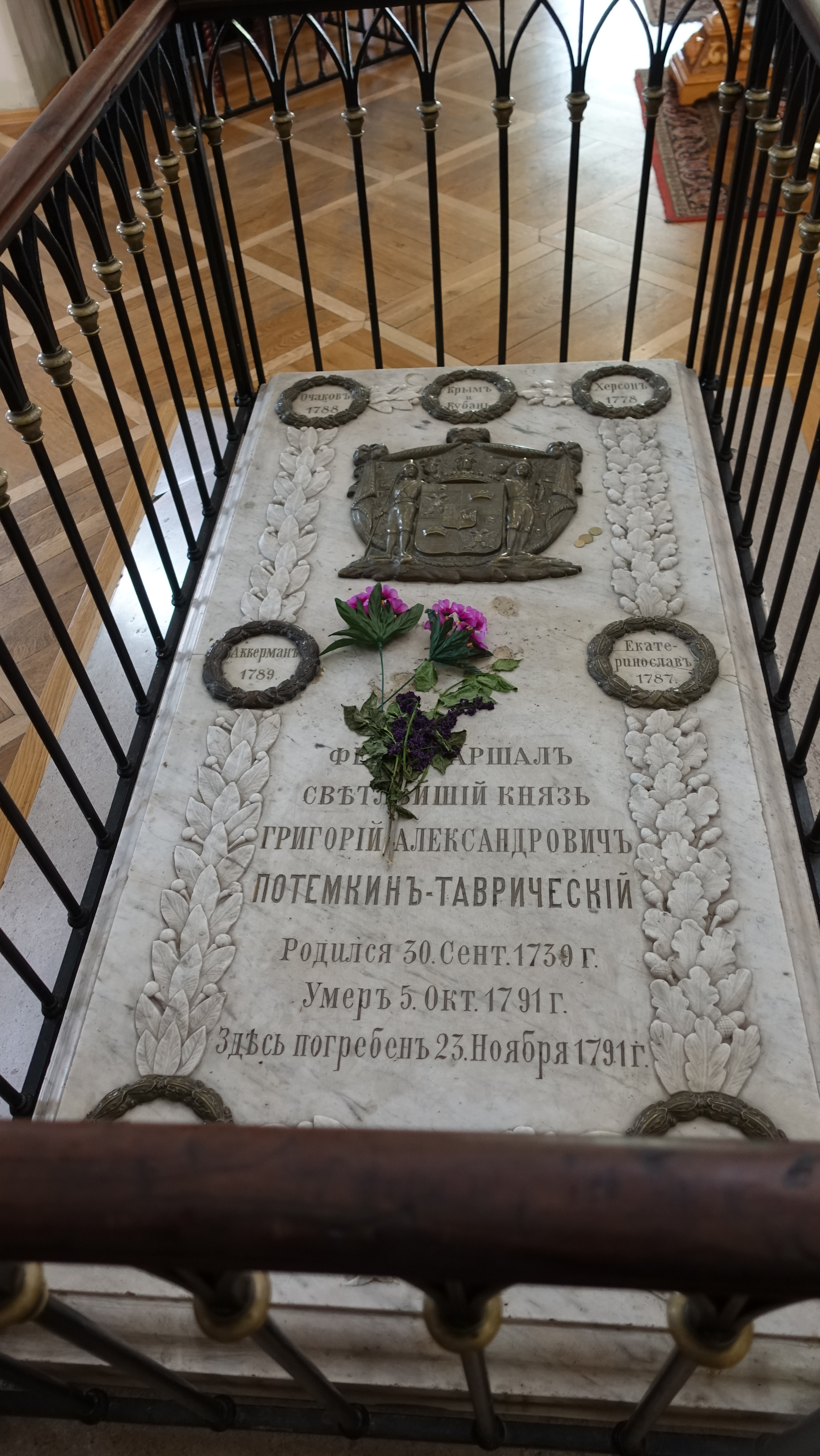

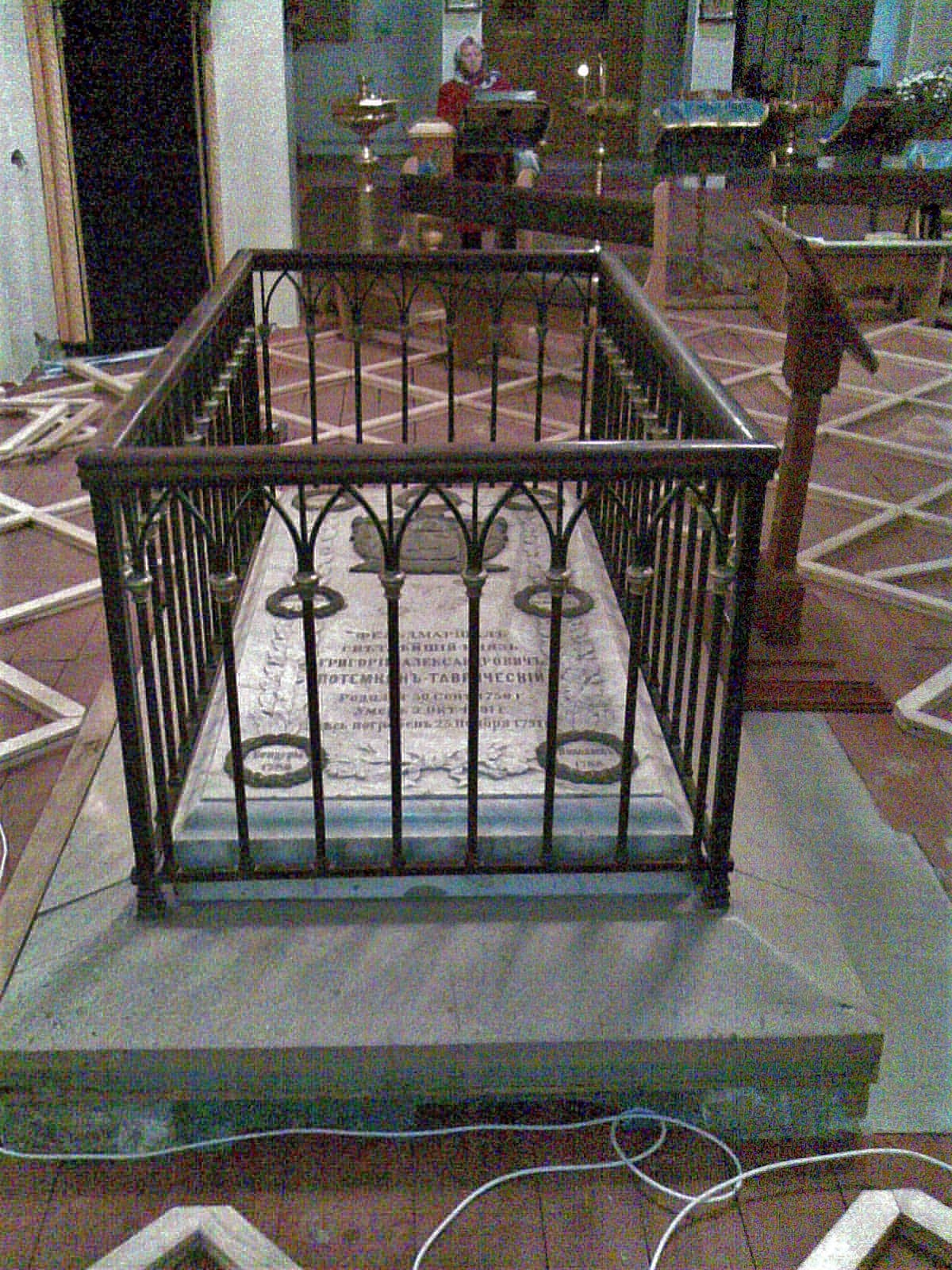

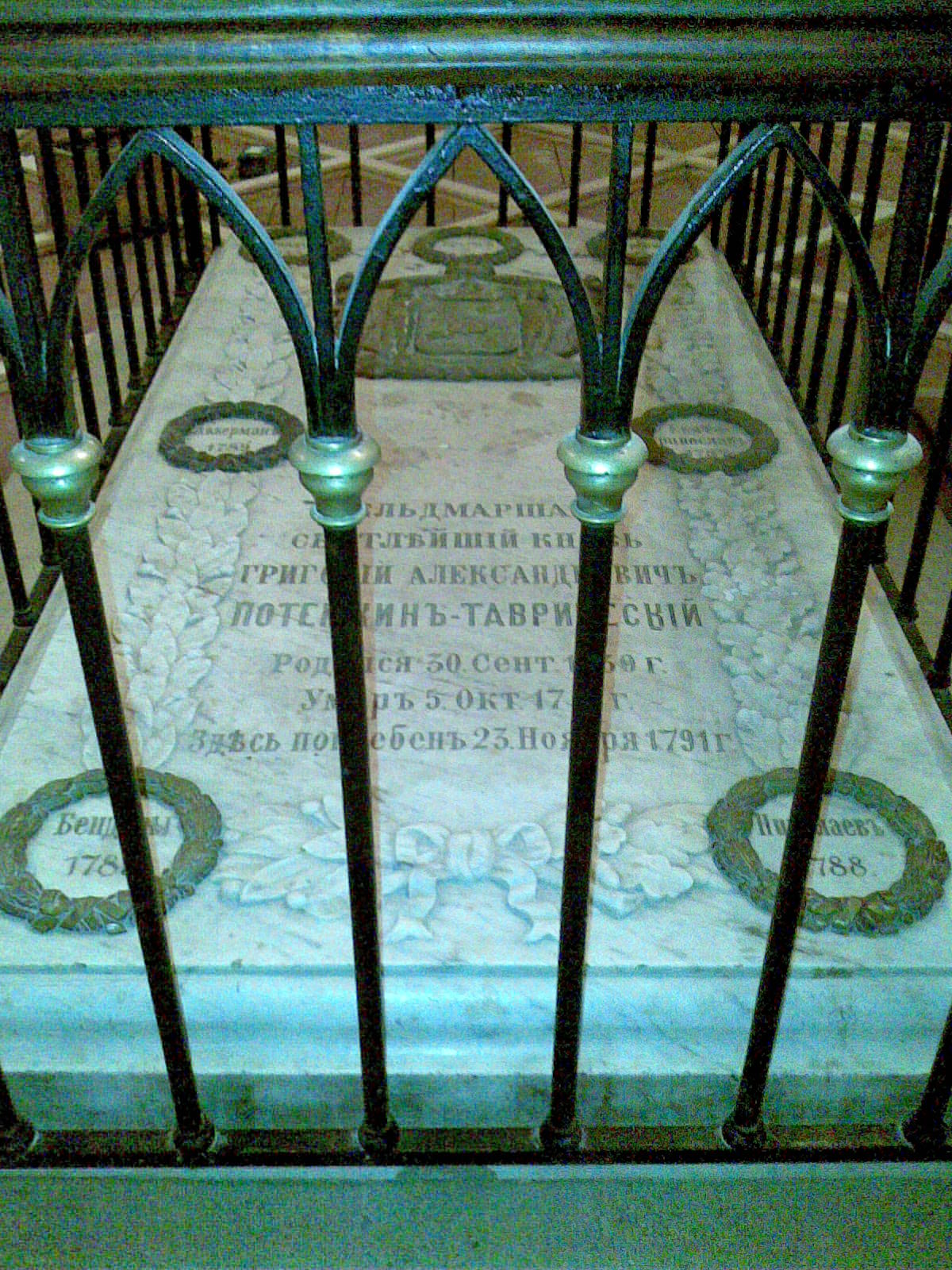

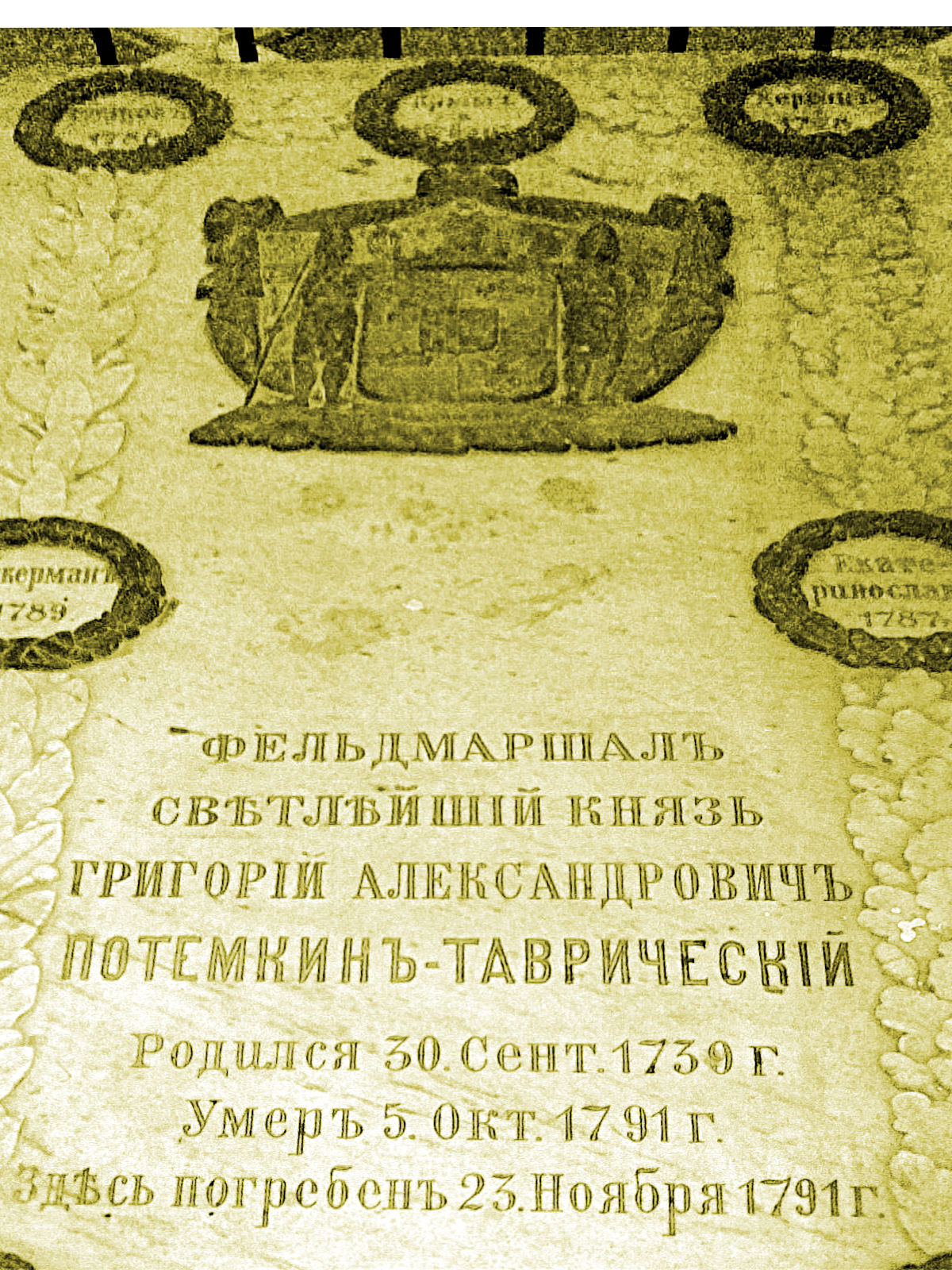
