= Great Stavropol Canal =

Canal in Stavropol Krai and Karachay-Cherkessia, Russia

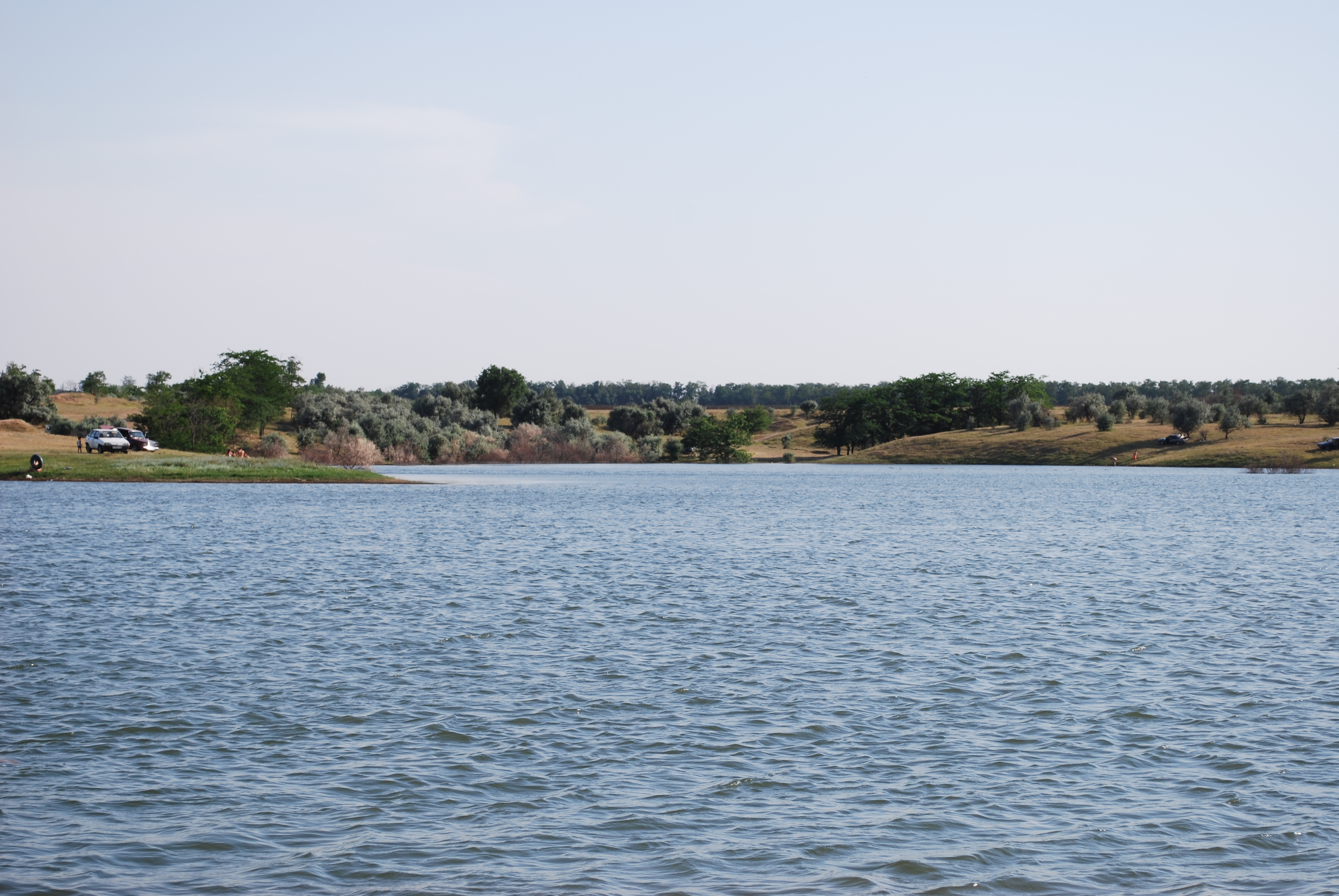
Great Stavropol Canal in the town of Gornii

The Great Stavropol Canal (Russian: Большой Ставропольский канал) is an irrigation canal in Stavropol Krai in Russia. It starts at a dam at Ust-Dzheguta on the upper Kuban River and leads water northeast via the Kalaus River to the Chogray Reservoir on the Manych River. It is 480 km long, and its maximum flow is 75 m^{3}/s. Construction work started in 1957 and continued to 2006. In the 1970s, the construction was under the supervision of the then First Secretary of the Stavropol kraikom, Mikhail Gorbachev.

== See also ==
- Nevinnomyssk Canal
- Bryk (mountain)
