= East Manych =

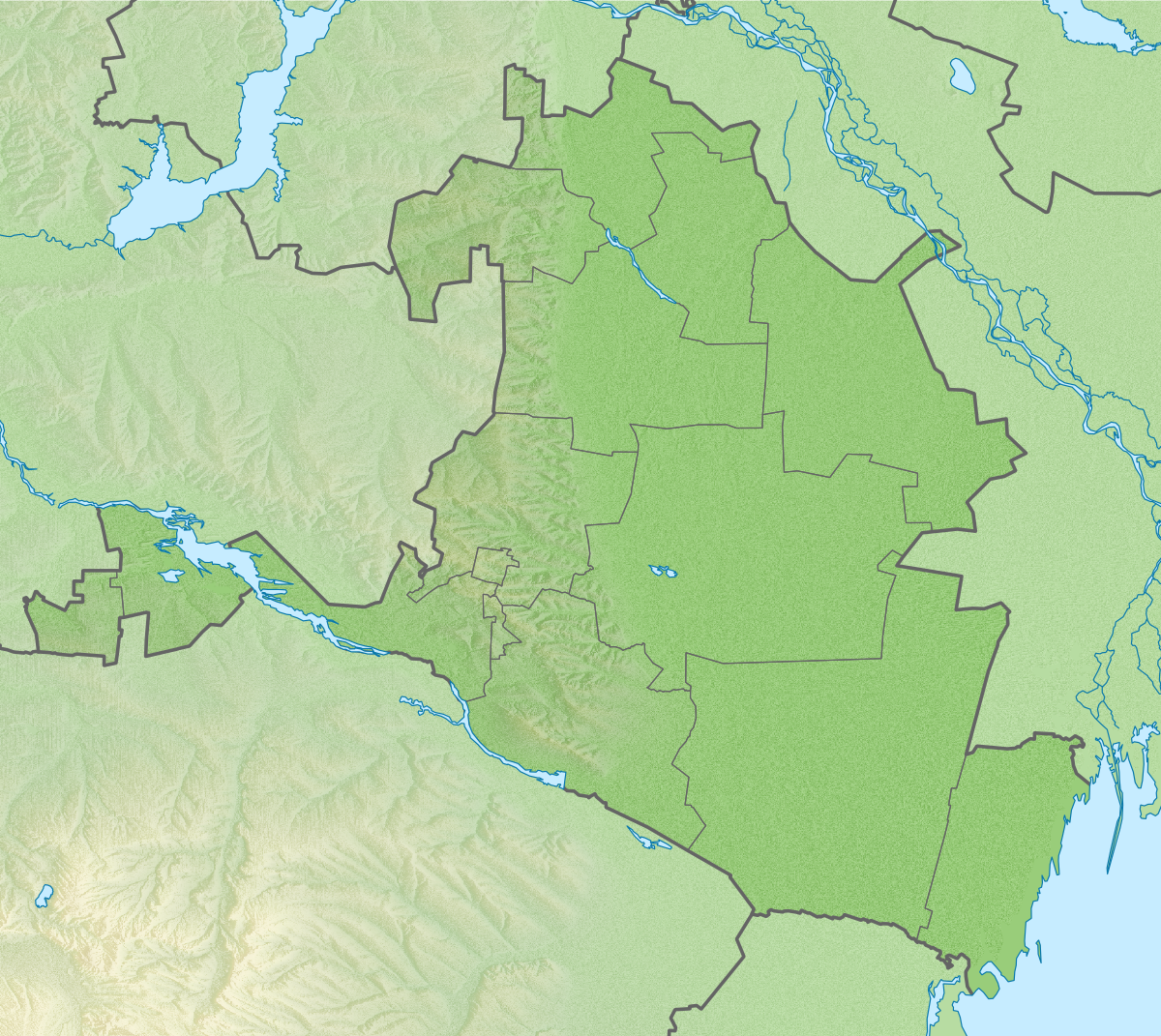
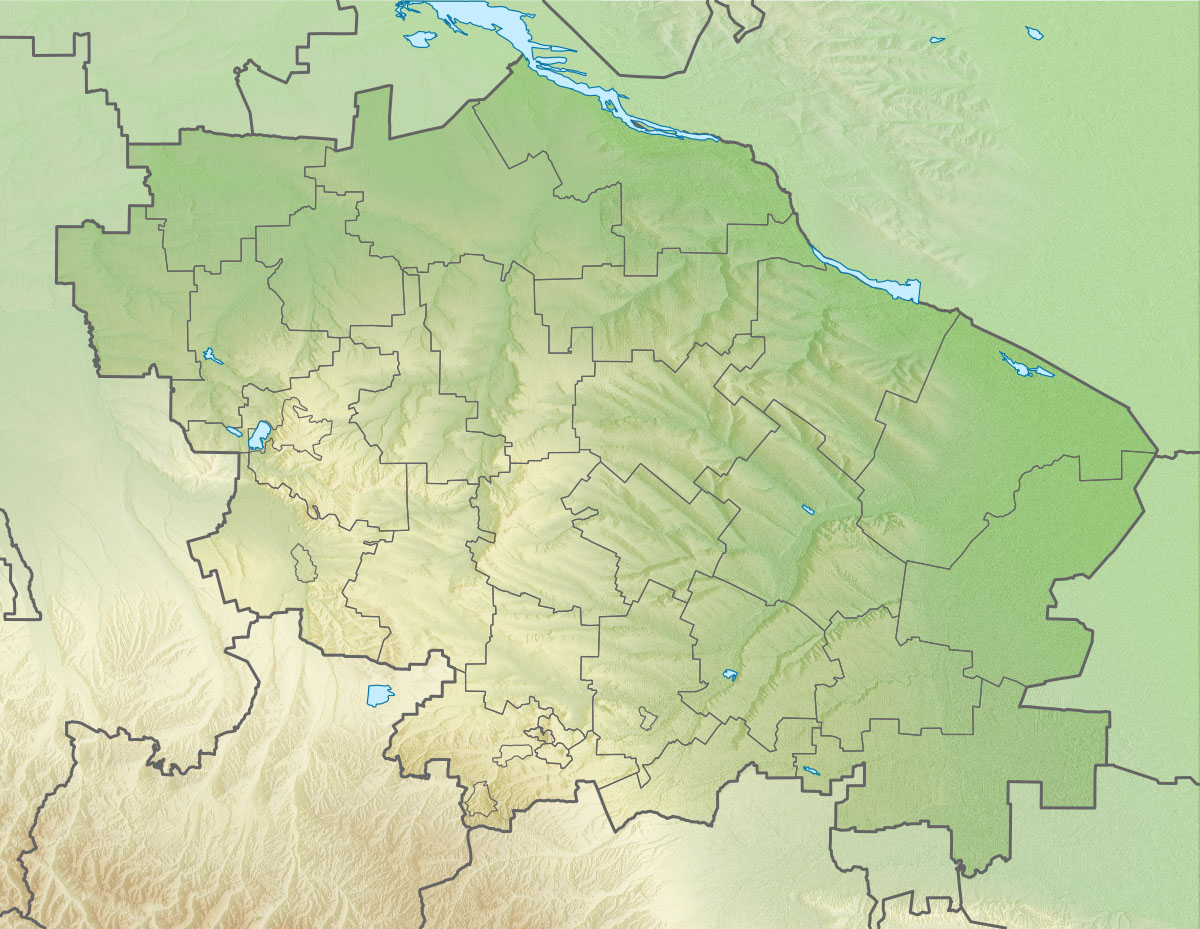

Location
- Country: Russia

East Manych (Russian: Восточный Маныч) is a river in the eastern and central part of the Kuma–Manych Depression in southern Russia.

East Manych flows east through Kalmykia and along its border with the Stavropol Krai, and ends in the Sostino Lakes (Состинские озёра). According to the Russian geographers, the East Manych is 141 km long; if one were to include the usually dry sections in its lower course, the total length would be over 220 km.

The Chogray Reservoir (Чограйское водохранилище; 45°29′30″N 44°36′10″E) was built on this river in 1969. The reservoir receives water from the Terek and Kuma Rivers via the Terek–Kuma Canal (completed 1958) and the Kuma–Manych Canal (completed 1965).

== Geographical description ==
=== The common source ===
Formerly, the upper reaches of the East and West Manych were connected, at least in wet years or seasons. The Kalaus River, when reaching the thalweg of the Kuma-Manych Depression at 45°43′N 44°06′E, would split: the left distributary, flowing north and then west, toward Lake Manych-Gudilo, would become the source of the West Manych, while the right distributary, flowing south and then east, would become the headwaters of the East Manych. During the 20th century, most of the water went into the eastern distributary, until it was dammed. Later, a solid dam was built at this point, preventing any water from flowing from the Kalaus into the East Manych, thus making the Kalaus the source of only the West Manych.

East Manych is a river located in the Kumo-Manych depression in Russia. It is a part of the system of reservoirs that are situated in this depression. The East Manych river has its own independent source, separate from the Western Manych river. The Manych depression reaches its highest height at approximately 20 meters in its central part, which extends from the village of Divnoy to the village of Zunda-Tolga. On both sides of the watershed area, the Manych basin is lowered, which results in its division into Western Manych and East Manych. While Western Manych belongs to the basin of the Sea of Azov, East Manych belongs to the basin of the Caspian Sea.

However, East Manych does not flow into the Caspian Sea, instead, it is lost in the Sostinsky lakes. In 1978, the Chogray discharge channel was constructed, which connects East Manych and Kuma. Until the 1970s, the direct source of the river was the Kalaus River, which reaches the Kumo-Manych depression and then turns sharply to the east. At Kalaus, a rare phenomenon called "bifurcation" was observed, which refers to the division of the river into two branches directed to different water systems. In high-water years or after heavy rains, Kalaus discharged water in two directions, mainly to the east - to East Manych, and also to the west along a small channel towards Lake Manych-Gudilo. Approximately 30% of the flow of the Kalaus went to Western Manych, while 70% went to the Eastern.

The restructuring of the hydrographic network of the Kuma-Manych depression took place in 1965–1975. During this time, the Kuban-Kalaus channels were constructed, and a dam at the mouth of the Kalaus River was built, which blocked the flow of the Kalaus River into the Vostochny Manych River. In order to maintain the level of the eastern compartment of the Proletarian reservoir, Kalaus was redirected to the Western Manych basin.

In 1969, the dam of the Chogray reservoir was built on East Manych. The reservoir waters are of poor quality and are mainly used for irrigation, non-drinking water supply, and fish farming. The reservoir is partially filled with local runoff from the Eastern Manych catchment area, as well as Terek and Kuma water supplied through the Terek-Manych waterway.
