= Kalmykia =

Republic of Russia in the Volga Region

Republic of Kalmykia Хальмг Таңһч (Kalmyk) Республика Калмыкия (Russian)
- Republic
- Flag Coat of arms
- Anthem: "Хальмг Таңһчин частр" "Anthem of the Republic of Kalmykia"
- Interactive map of Republic of Kalmykia
- Coordinates: 46°34′N 45°19′E
- Country: Russia
- Federal district: Southern
- Economic region: Volga
- Capital: Elista

Government
  - Type: People's Khural
  - Head: Batu Khasikov

Area
  - Total: 74,731 km^{2} (28,854 sq mi)

Population (2021 Census)
  - Total: ▲267,133: 62.5% Kalmyks; 25.7% Russians; 11.8% others/not stated
  - Rank: 78th
  - Urban: 46.7%
  - Rural: 53.3%

GDP (nominal, 2024)
  - Total: ₽167 billion (US$1.96 billion)
  - Per capita: ₽627,610 (US$7,364.5)
- Time zone: UTC+3 (MSK)
- ISO 3166 code: RU-KL
- Vehicle registration: 08
- Official language(s): Kalmyk • Russian
- Website: kalmregion.ru

Kalmykia, (Note: /kɑːlˈmiːkiə/ kahl-MEEK-ee-ə; Russian: Калмыкия, romanized: Kalmykiya, lit. 'Land of the Kalmyks', Russian pronunciation: [kɐlˈmɨkʲɪjə]; Kalmyk: Хальмг, romanized: Khalmg, [χalʲˈməq]) officially the Republic of Kalmykia, (Note: Russian: Республика Калмыкия, IPA: [rʲɪsˈpublʲɪkə kɐlˈmɨkʲɪjə]; Kalmyk: Хальмг Таңһч, Khalmg Tanghch [χalʲˈməq tʰaɴʁə̆ˈt͡ɕʰɪ̃]) is a republic of Russia, located in the Volga region of European Russia. The republic is part of the Southern Federal District, and borders Dagestan to the south and Stavropol Krai to the southwest; Volgograd Oblast to the northwest and north and Astrakhan Oblast to the north and east; Rostov Oblast to the west and the Caspian Sea to the east. Through the Caspian Depression, the Kuma river forms Kalmykia's natural border with Dagestan. Kalmykia is the only polity within the European continent where Buddhism is the majority religion; the majority of Kalmyk people are Vajrayana Tibetan Buddhists of the Gelug and Kagyu lineages.

The Kalmykia republic covers an area of 76,100 square kilometres (29,400 square miles), with a small population of about 275,000 residents. The republic of Kalmykia is home of the Kalmyks, a people of Oirat Mongolian origin who are mainly of Tibetan Buddhist faith. The capital of the republic is the city of Elista.

== Geography ==
The republic is located in Southern Russia, lying north of the North Caucasus. A small stretch of the Volga River flows through eastern Kalmykia. Other major rivers include the Yegorlyk, the Kuma, and the Manych. Lake Manych-Gudilo is the largest lake; other lakes of significance include Lakes Sarpa and Tsagan-Khak. The highest point in Kalmykia is shared, with an elevation of 222 metres (728 ft); it is located in the Yergeni hills.

Kalmykia's natural resources include coal, oil, and natural gas.

=== Climate ===
The average January temperature is −5 °C (23 °F) and the average July temperature is 24 °C (75 °F). Average annual precipitation ranges from 170 millimeters (6.7 in) in the east of the republic to 400 millimeters (16 in) in the west. The small town of Utta is the hottest place in Russia. On 12 July 2010, during a significant heatwave affecting all of Russia, an all-time record-high temperature was observed at 45.4 °C (113.7 °F).

=== Flora and fauna ===
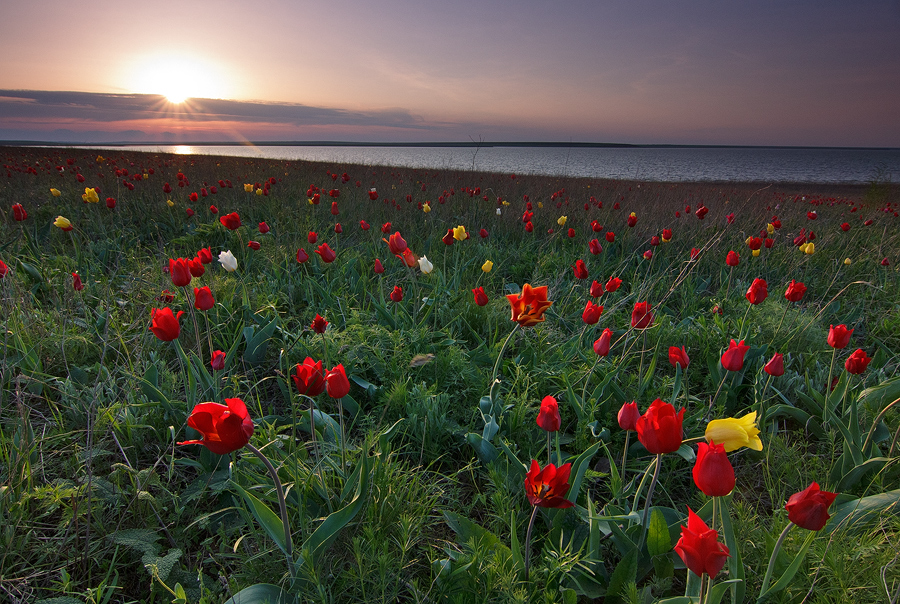
Bamb Tsetsg (Tulip) Island national park

The republic's wildlife includes the saiga antelope, whose habitat is protected in Chyornye Zemli Nature Reserve.

==== National Parks ====
- Bamb Tsetsg Tulip Island

== History ==
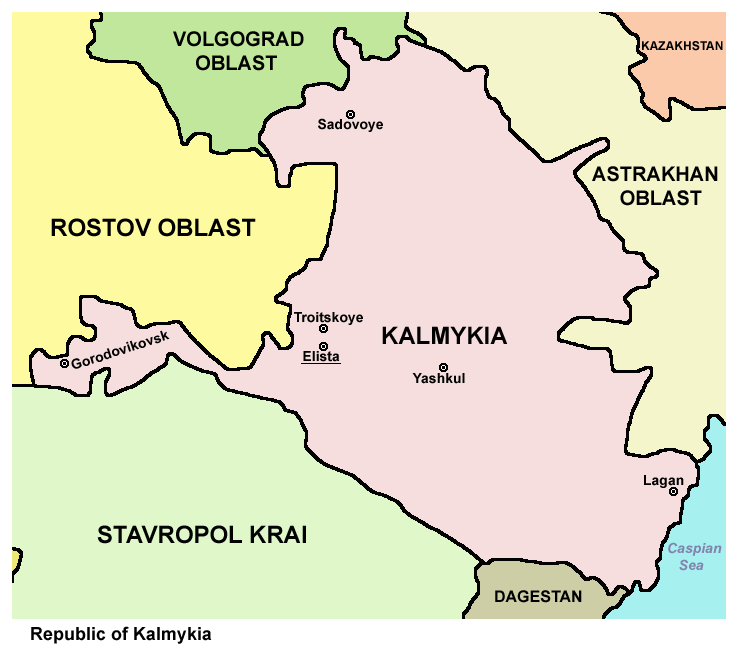
Map of the Republic of Kalmykia.

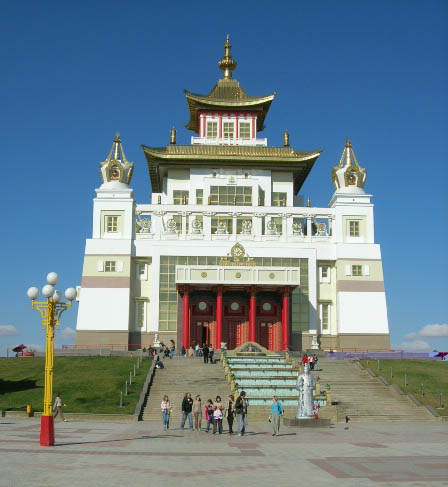
The Golden Temple in Elista

According to the Kurgan hypothesis, the upland regions of modern-day Kalmykia formed part of the cradle of Indo-European culture. Hundreds of kurgans can be seen in these areas, known as the Indo-European Urheimat (Samara culture, Sredny Stog culture, Yamna culture).

Some of the first recorded peoples to move into this territory were the Scythians and Sarmatians from the central Eurasian steppe, bringing their respective religious systems with them. Later on, all three major Abrahamic religions also took root, with the Khazar conversion to Judaism being a notable (if historically contested) episode in the religion's history. The Alans were a major Muslim people group, who faced the invading Mongols and their Tengrist practices, with some of the latter settling permanently. The later Nogais were Muslims, but were replaced by the contemporaneous Oirat Kalmyks, who practice Mongolian Buddhism. With the annexation of the region by the Russian Empire, there was an influx of the East Slavic-speaking Russian Orthodox settlers. Many religious institutions were suppressed in the wake of the Russian Revolution.

=== Kalmyk autonomy ===
The ancestors of the Kalmyks, the Oirat Mongols, migrated from the steppes of southern Siberia on the banks of the Irtysh River, reaching the Lower Volga region of Eastern Europe by the early 17th century. Historians have given various explanations for the move, but generally recognise that the Kalmyks sought abundant pastures for their herds. Another motivation may have involved escaping the growing dominance of the neighbouring Dzungar Mongol tribe. They reached the lower Volga region in or about 1630. That land, however, was not uncontested pastures, but rather the homeland of the Nogai Horde, a confederation of Turkic-speaking nomadic tribes. The Kalmyks expelled the Nogais, who fled to the Caucasian plains and to the Crimean Khanate, areas (at least theoretically) under the control of the Ottoman Empire. Some Nogai groups sought the protection of the Russian garrison at Astrakhan. The remaining nomadic Mongol Oirat tribes became vassals of the Kalmyk Khan.

The Kalmyks settled in the wide-open steppes – from Saratov in the north to Astrakhan on the Volga delta in the south and to the Terek River in the southwest. They also encamped on both sides of the Volga River, from the Don River in the west to the Ural River in the east. Although these territories had been recently annexed by the Tsardom of Russia, Moscow was in no position to settle the area with Russian colonists. This area under Kalmyk control would eventually be called the Kalmyk Khanate.

Within twenty-five years of settling in the Lower Volga region, the Kalmyks became subjects of the Tsar of Russia. In exchange for protecting Russia's southern border, the Kalmyks were promised an annual allowance and access to the markets of Russian border settlements. The open access to Russian markets was supposed to discourage mutual raiding on the part of the Kalmyks and of the Russians and Bashkirs, a Russian-dominated Turkic people, but this was not often the practice. In addition, Kalmyk allegiance was often nominal, as the Kalmyk Khans practised self-government, based on a set of laws they called the Great Code of the Nomads (Iki Tsaadzhin Bichig).

The Kalmyk Khanate reached its peak of military and political power under Ayuka Khan (ruled 1672–1724, khan 1690–1724). During his era, the Kalmyk Khanate fulfilled its responsibility to protect the southern borders of Russia and conducted many military expeditions against its Turkic-speaking neighbours. Successful military expeditions were also conducted in the Caucasus. The Khanate experienced economic prosperity from free trade with Russian border towns, with China, with Tibet and with Muslim neighbours. During this era, the Kalmyks also kept close contacts with their Oirat kinsmen in Dzungaria, as well as with the Dalai Lama in Tibet, about that period there is a lively narrative by Thomas De Quincey, written in 1837 about events that happened in 1771.

=== Russian Civil War ===
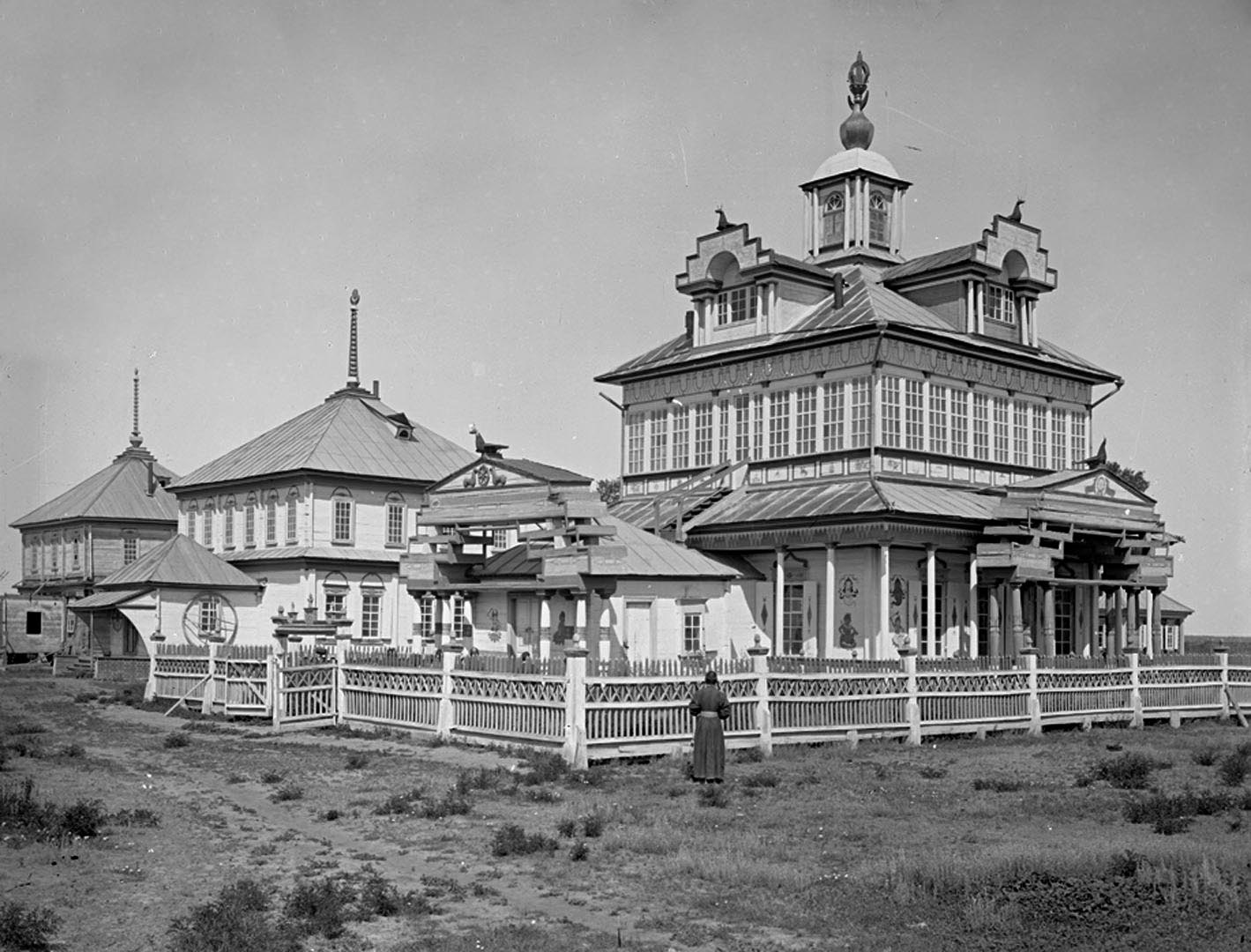
Kalmyk Khurul Tsagan Aman

After the October Revolution in 1917, many Don Kalmyks joined the White Russian army and fought under the command of Generals Denikin and Wrangel during the Russian Civil War. Before the Red Army broke through to the Crimean Peninsula towards the end of 1920, a large group of Kalmyks fled from Russia with the remnants of the defeated White Army to the Black Sea ports of Turkey.

The majority of the refugees chose to resettle in Belgrade, Yugoslavia. Other, much smaller, groups chose Sofia (Bulgaria), Prague (Czechoslovakia) and Paris and Lyon (France). The Kalmyk refugees in Belgrade built a Buddhist temple there in 1929.

=== Soviet period ===
Coat of arms of Kalmyk ASSR

In July 1919, Bolshevik leader Vladimir Lenin issued an appeal to the Kalmyk people, calling for them to revolt and to aid the Red Army. Lenin promised to provide the Kalmyks, among other things, a sufficient quantity of land for their own use. The promise came to fruition on 4 November 1920, when a resolution was passed by the All-Russian Central Executive Committee proclaiming the formation of the Kalmyk Autonomous Oblast. Fifteen years later, on 22 October 1935, the Oblast was elevated to republic status, Kalmyk Autonomous Soviet Socialist Republic.

In line with the policy of Korenizatsiya based on the concept of titular nations, the government of the Soviet Union adopted a strategy of national delimitation, while at the same time enforcing the Leninist principle of democratic centralism. According to Dorzha Arbakov, decentralized governing bodies were a tool the Bolsheviks used to control the Kalmyk people:

... the Soviet authorities were greatly interested in Sovietizing Kalmykia as quickly as possible and with the least amount of bloodshed. Although the Kalmyks alone were not a significant force, the Soviet authorities wished to win popularity in the Asian and Buddhist worlds by demonstrating their evident concern for the Buddhists in Russia.

After establishing control, the Soviet authorities did not overtly enforce an anti-religion policy, other than through passive means, because it sought to bring Mongolia and Tibet into its sphere of influence. The government also was compelled to respond to domestic disturbances resulting from the economic policies of War Communism and the 1921 famine. The passive measures that were taken by Soviet authorities to control the people included the imposition of a harsh tax to close places of worship and religious schools. The Cyrillic script replaced Todo Bichig, the traditional Kalmyk vertical script.

On 22 January 1922, Mongolia proposed to migrate the Kalmyks during the famine in Kalmykia. Russia refused help; 71–72,000 Kalmyks died during the famine. Revolts erupted among the Kalmyks in 1926 and 1930 (on 1942–1943, see the next section). In March 1927, the Soviets deported 20,000 Kalmyks to the tundras of Siberia and Karelia.

The Kalmyks of the Don Voisko Oblast were subject to the policies of de-cossackization where villages were destroyed, khuruls (temples) and monasteries were burned down and executions were indiscriminate. At the same time, grain, livestock and other foodstuffs were seized. In December 1927 the Fifteenth Party Congress of the Soviet Union passed a resolution calling for the "voluntary" collectivization of agriculture. The change in policy was accompanied by a new campaign of repression, directed initially against the small farming class. The objective of this campaign was to suppress the resistance of farming peasants to the full-scale collectivization of agriculture.

=== World War II ===
On 22 June 1941, the German army invaded the Soviet Union. By 12 August 1942, the German Army Group South captured Elista, the capital of the Kalmyk ASSR. After capturing the Kalmyk territory, German army officials established a propaganda campaign with the assistance of anti-communist Kalmyk nationalists, including white emigre, Kalmyk exiles. The total Jewish dead numbered between 100 and upwards of 700, according to documents held in the Kalmyk State Archives. The campaign was focused primarily on recruiting and organizing Kalmyk men into anti-Soviet militia units.

- Kalmüken Verband Dr. Doll (Kalmukian Volunteers)
- Abwehrtrupp 103 (Kalmukian Volunteers)
- Kalmücken-Legion or Kalmücken-Kavallerie-Korps (Kalmukian Volunteers)

The Kalmyk units were extremely successful in flushing out and killing Soviet partisans. But by December 1942, the Soviet Red Army retook the Kalmyk ASSR, forcing the Kalmyks assigned to those units to flee, in some cases with their wives and children in hand.

The Kalmyk units retreated westward into unfamiliar territory with the retreating German army and were reorganized into the Kalmuck Legion, although the Kalmyks themselves preferred the name Kalmuck Cavalry Corps. The casualty rate also increased substantially during the retreat, especially among the Kalmyk officers. To replace those killed, the German army imposed forced conscription, taking in teenagers and middle-aged men. As a result, the overall effectiveness of the Kalmyk units declined.

By the end of the war, the remnants of the Kalmuck Cavalry Corps had made their way to Austria where the Kalmyk soldiers and their family members became post-war refugees.

Those who did not want to leave formed militia units that chose to stay behind and harass the oncoming Soviet Red Army.

Although a number of Kalmyks chose to fight against the Soviet Union, the majority by and large did not, fighting the German army in regular Soviet Red army units and in partisan resistance units behind the battlelines throughout the Soviet Union. Before their removal from the Soviet Red Army and from partisan resistance units after December 1943, approximately 8,000 Kalmyks were awarded various orders and medals, including 21 Kalmyk men who were recognized as Heroes of the Soviet Union.

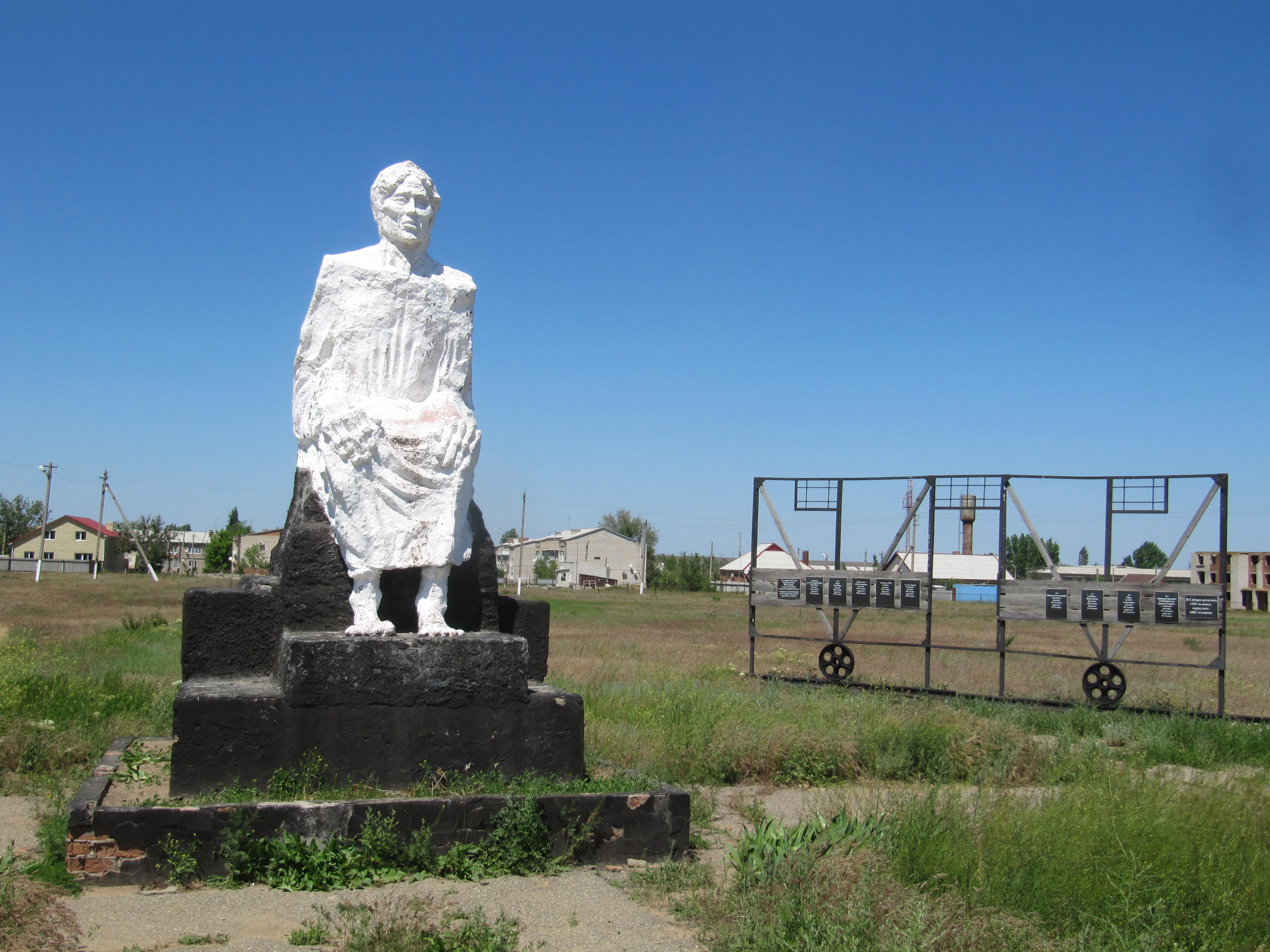
Memorial to the deportation in Troitskoye

On 27 December 1943, Soviet authorities declared that "many Kalmyks" were guilty of cooperation with the German Army and cited that as a justification to order the deportation of the entire Kalmyk population, including those who had served with the Soviet Army, to various locations in Central Asia and Siberia. In conjunction with the deportation, the Kalmyk ASSR was abolished and its territory was split between adjacent Astrakhan, Rostov and Stalingrad Oblasts and Stavropol Krai. To completely obliterate any traces of the Kalmyk people, the Soviet authorities renamed the former republic's towns and villages.

=== Post-war Kalmykia ===
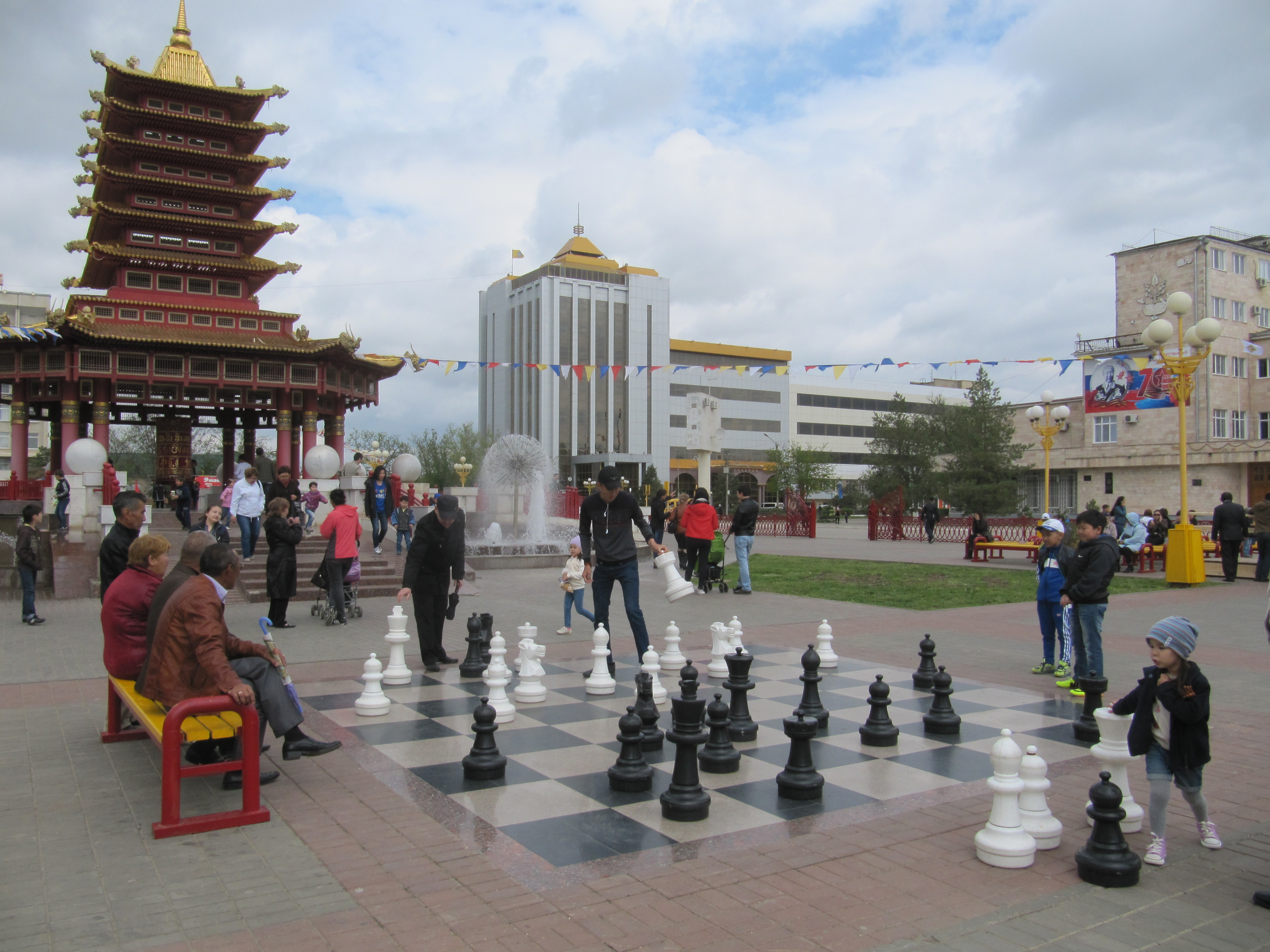
Elista, the capital of Kalmykia, 9 May 2015.

Due to their widespread dispersal in Siberia, their language and culture suffered a possibly irreversible decline. Khrushchev finally allowed their return in 1957, when they found their homes, jobs, and land occupied by imported Russians and Ukrainians, who remained. On 9 January 1957, Kalmykia again became an autonomous oblast, and on 29 July 1958, an autonomous republic within the Russian SFSR.

In the following years, bad planning of agricultural and irrigation projects resulted in widespread desertification. On orders from Moscow, sheep production increased beyond levels that the fragile steppe could sustain, resulting in 1.4 million acres (5666 km^{2}) of the artificial desert. To ramp up output, economically nonviable industrial plants were constructed.

After the dissolution of the USSR, Kalmykia kept the status of an autonomous republic within the newly formed Russian Federation (effective 31 March 1992).

== Politics ==
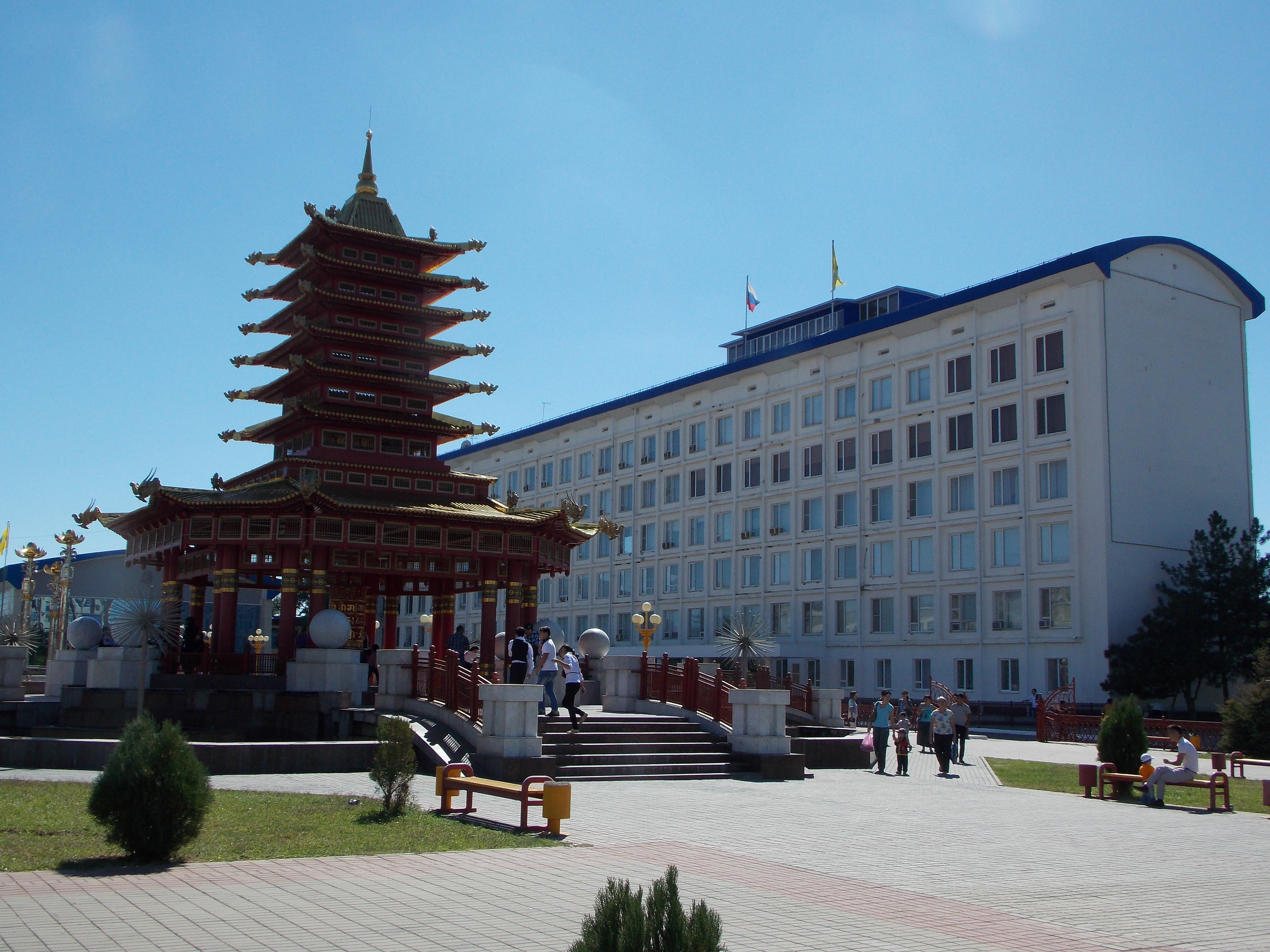
Parliament of Kalmykia in Lenin Square, Elista.

The head of the government in Kalmykia is called "The Head of the Republic". After a reform in 2006 that made the governors of the federal subjects appointable by the President, the President of Russia selected a candidate for the Head of the Republic position and presented it to the Parliament of Kalmyk Republic, the People's Khural, for approval. If a candidate was not approved, the President of the Russian Federation could dissolve the Parliament and set up new elections. Since the reform was revoked in 2011, the Head of the Republic has been elected by a direct vote, the first such election happening in 2014.

Flag of Kalmykia in 1992–1993

From 1993 to 2010, the Head of the Republic was Kirsan Ilyumzhinov. He also was the president of the world chess organization FIDE until 2018. He has spent much of his fortune on promoting chess in Kalmykia—where chess is compulsory in all primary schools—and also overseas, with Elista, the capital of Kalmykia, hosting many international tournaments.

In the late 1990s, the Ilyumzhinov government was alleged to be spending too much government money on chess-related projects. The allegations were published in Sovietskaya Kalmykia, the opposition newspaper in Elista. Larisa Yudina, the journalist who investigated these accusations, was kidnapped and murdered in 1998. Two men, Sergei Vaskin and Tyurbi Boskomdzhiv, who worked in the local civil service, were charged with her murder, one of them having been a former presidential bodyguard. After prolonged investigations by the Russian authorities, both men were found guilty and jailed, but no evidence was discovered that Ilyumzhinov himself was in any way responsible.

On 24 October 2010, Ilyumzhinov was replaced by Alexey Orlov as the new Head of Kalmykia. Since September 2019 the acting President of Kalmykia is Batu Khasikov.

Since 2008, Anatoly Kozachko has been President of the Parliament, the People's Khural. The current Prime Minister of Kalmykia is Lyudmila Ivanovna. All the three top politicians belong to the Kremlin's "United Russia" Party.

== Administrative divisions ==
Republic of Kalmykia is administratively divided into 13 districts, 3 cities or towns and 111 selsoviets.

== Demographics ==
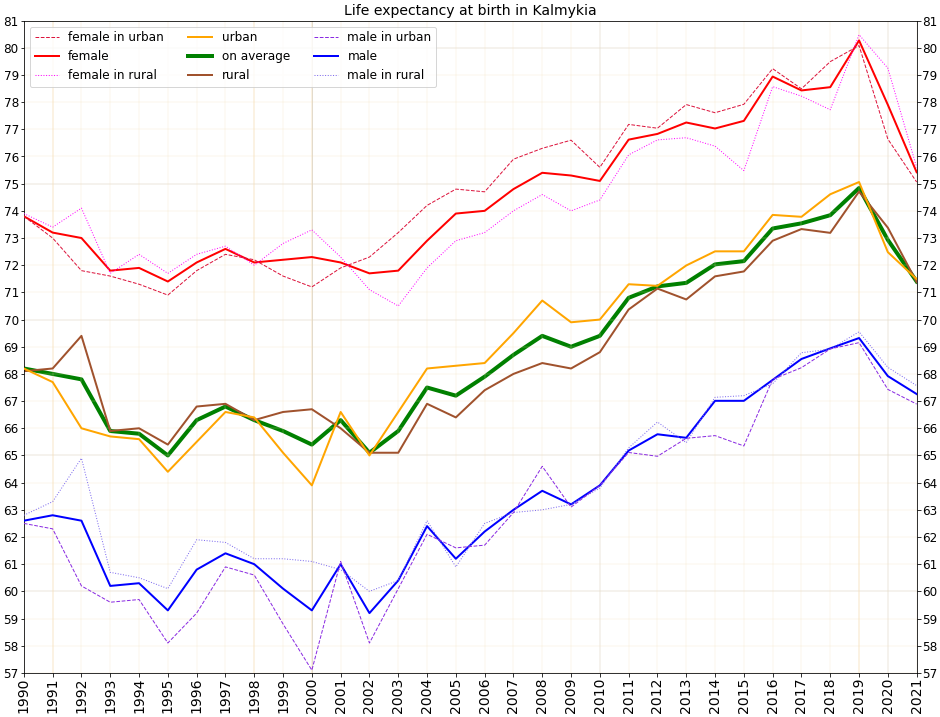
Life expectancy at birth in Kalmykia

Population: 267,133 (2021 census); 289,481 (2010 census); 292,410 (2002 census); 322,589 (1989 Soviet census).

Life expectancy:

	2019	2021
Average:	74.8 years	71.4 years
Male:	69.3 years	67.3 years
Female:	80.3 years	75.4 years

=== Vital statistics ===
Vital statistics

Source: Russian Federal State Statistics Service Archived 12 April 2008 at the Wayback Machine

	Average population (x 1000)	Live births	Deaths	Natural change	Crude birth rate (per 1000)	Crude death rate (per 1000)	Natural change (per 1000)	Fertility rates
1970	269	4,801	1,661	3,140	17.8	6.2	11.7	
1975	283	5,923	2,228	3,695	20.9	7.9	13.1	
1980	299	7,062	2,735	4,327	23.6	9.1	14.5	
1985	314	7,945	2,832	5,113	25.3	9.0	16.3	
1990	326	6,828	2,669	4,159	20.9	8.2	12.7	2,66
1991	327	6,369	2,755	3,614	19.5	8.4	11.1	2,58
1992	323	5,865	2,806	3,059	18.2	8.7	9.5	2,57
1993	319	5,027	3,167	1,860	15.8	9.9	5.8	2,30
1994	317	4,684	3,226	1,458	14.8	10.2	4.6	2,20
1995	316	4,321	3,359	962	13.7	10.6	3.0	2,03
1996	314	3,929	3,232	697	12.5	10.3	2.2	1,82
1997	313	3,845	3,072	773	12.3	9.8	2.5	1,77
1998	311	3,858	3,279	579	12.4	10.5	1.9	1,76
1999	309	3,598	3,356	242	11.6	10.8	0.8	1,62
2000	308	3,473	3,439	34	11.3	11.2	0.1	1,55
2001	302	3,530	3,357	173	11.7	11.1	0.6	1,57
2002	295	3,729	3,637	92	12.7	12.3	0.3	1,70
2003	291	3,874	3,437	437	13.3	11.8	1.5	1,77
2004	291	3,923	3,184	739	13.5	11.0	2.5	1,77
2005	290	3,788	3,350	438	13.1	11.5	1.5	1,69
2006	289	3,820	3,207	613	13.2	11.1	2.1	1,69
2007	289	4,146	3,141	1,005	14.3	10.9	3.5	1,83
2008	289	4,354	2,976	1,378	15.1	10.3	4.8	1,93
2009	289	4,270	3,115	1,155	14.8	10.8	4.0	1,81
2010	289	4,432	3,191	1,241	15.3	11.0	4.3	1,88
2011	288	4,194	2,920	1,274	14,5	10,1	4.4	1,81
2012	286	4,268	2,870	1,398	15,0	10,1	4.9	1,89
2013	283	4,126	2,805	1,321	14,6	9,9	4.7	1,88
2014	281	3,969	2,787	1,182	14,1	9,9	4.2	1,85
2015	280	3,823	2,743	1,080	13,6	9,8	3.8	1,83
2016	278	3,492	2,709	783	12.5	9.7	2.8	1.72(e)
2017	277	3,028	2,755	273	10.9	9.9	1.0	
2018	275	3,043	2,649	394	11.0	9.6	1.4	
2019		2,814	2,561	253	10.3	9.4	0.9	
2020		2,758	3,013	-255	10.2	11.1	-0.9	
2021		2,650	3,633	-983	9.8	13.5	-3.7	
2022		2,434	2,778	-343	9.1	10.4	-1.3	
2023		2,403	2,517	-114	9.1	9.5	-0.4	

Historical population
Year	Pop.	±%
1926	161,176	—
1959	184,857	+14.7%
1970	267,993	+45.0%
1979	293,528	+9.5%
1989	322,589	+9.9%
2002	292,410	−9.4%
2010	289,481	−1.0%
2021	267,133	−7.7%
Source: Census data

=== Ethnic groups ===
According to the 2021 Census, Kalmyks make up 62.5% of the republic's population. Other groups include Russians (25.7%), Dargins (2.8%), Kazakhs (1.7%), Turks (1.6%), Chechens (1.1%), Avars (1.0%), and Koreans (0.4%).

Census year	Kalmyks		Russians		Others	
Census year	#	%	#	%	#	%
1926	107,026	75.6%	15,212	10.7%	19,356	13.7%
1939	107,315	48.6%	100,814	45.7%	12,555	5.7%
1959	64,882	35.1%	103,349	55.9%	16,626	9.0%
1970	110,264	41.1%	122,757	45.8%	34,972	13.0%
1979	122,167	41.5%	125,510	42.6%	46,850	15.9%
1989	146,316	45.4%	121,531	37.7%	54,732	17.0%
2002	155,938	53.3%	98,115	33.6%	38,357	13.1%
2010	162,740	57.4%	85,712	30.2%	35,239	12.4%
2021 (Note: 12,370 people were registered from administrative databases, and could not declare an ethnicity. It is estimated that the proportion of ethnicities in this group is the same as that of the declared group.)	159,138	62.5%	65,490	25.7%	30,135	11.8%

Ethnic map of Caucasus

The population of Kalmyks in the Russian Empire, Soviet Union and Russian Federation:

year	population
1897	190,648
1926	128,809
1939	129,786
1959	100,603
1970	131,318
1979	140,103
1989	165,103
2002	174,000
2010	183,372
2021	179,547

=== Religion ===
Religion in Kalmykia (2012)
1. Tibetan Buddhism (47.6%)
2. Russian Orthodoxy (18.0%)
3. Other and undeclared (9.60%)
4. Spiritual but not religious (8.20%)
5. Atheist (8.00%)
6. Islam (4.80%)
7. Tengrism and Shamanism (3.00%)
8. Other Christians (0.80%)

Tibetan Buddhism is the traditional and most popular religion among the Kalmyks, while ethnic Russians in the country practice predominantly Russian Orthodoxy. A minority of Kalmyks practice pre-Buddhist shamanism or Tengrism (a contemporary revival of the Turkic and Mongolic shamanic religions). Many people are unaffiliated and non-religious.

According to a 2012 survey, 47.6% of the population of Kalmykia adhere to Buddhism, 18% to the Russian Orthodox Church, 4.8% to Islam, 3% to Tengrism or Kalmyk shamanism, 1% are unaffiliated Christians, 1% are either Orthodox Christian believers who do not belong to a church or are members of non-Russian Orthodox churches, 0.4% adhere to forms of Hinduism, and 9.0% follow other religions or did not give an answer to the survey. In addition, 8.2% of the population declared themselves to be "spiritual but not religious" and another 8% to be atheist.

=== Education ===
Kalmyk State University is the largest higher education facility in the republic.

== Economy ==
Kalmykia has a developed agricultural sector. Other developed industries include the food processing and oil and gas industries.

As most of Kalmykia is arid, irrigation is necessary for agriculture. The Cherney Zemli Irrigation Scheme (Черноземельская оросительная система) in southern Kalmykia receives water from the Caucasian rivers Terek and Kuma via a chain of canals: water flows from the Terek to the Kuma via the Terek-Kuma Canal, then to the Chogray Reservoir on the East Manych River via the Kuma–Manych Canal, and finally into Kalmykia's steppes over the Cherney Zemli Main Canal, constructed in the 1970s.

The government of Kalmykia spends about $100 million annually. Its annual oil production is about 1,270,000 barrels.

== Emigration and culture ==
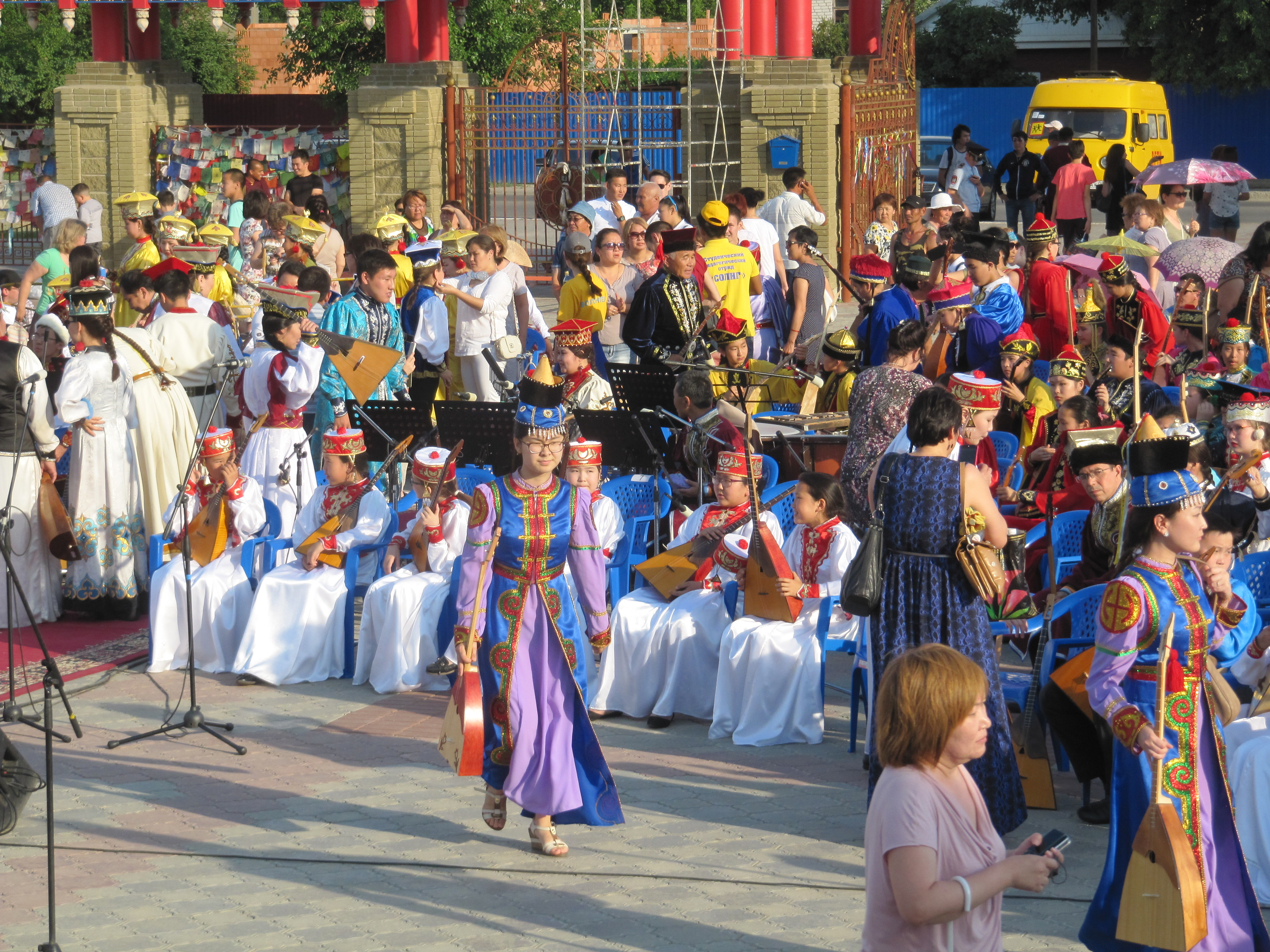
Traditional instruments include the dombra.

The Kalmyks of Kyrgyzstan live primarily in the Karakol region of eastern Kyrgyzstan. They are referred to as Sart Kalmyks. The origin of this name is unknown. Likewise, it is not known when, why and from where this small group of Kalmyks migrated to eastern Kyrgyzstan. Due to their minority status, the Sart Kalmyks have adopted the Kyrgyz language and culture of the majority Kyrgyz population.

Although many Sart Kalmyks are Muslims, Kalmyks elsewhere, by and large, remain faithful to the Gelugpa Order of Tibetan Buddhism. In Kalmykia, for example, the Gelugpa Order with the assistance of the government has constructed numerous Buddhist temples. In addition, the Kalmyk people recognize Tenzin Gyatso, 14th Dalai Lama as their spiritual leader and Erdne Ombadykow, a Kalmyk American, as the supreme lama of the Kalmyk people. The Dalai Lama has visited Elista on a number of occasions.

The Kalmyks have also established communities in the United States, primarily in Pennsylvania and New Jersey. The majority are descended from those Kalmyks who fled from Russia in late 1920 to France, Yugoslavia, Bulgaria, and, later, Germany. Many of those Kalmyks living in Germany at the end of World War II were eventually granted passage to the United States.

As a consequence of their decades-long migration through Europe, many older Kalmyks are fluent in German, French, and Serbo-Croatian, in addition to Russian and their native Kalmyk language. There are several Kalmyk Buddhist temples in Monmouth County, New Jersey, where the vast majority of American Kalmyks reside, as well as a Tibetan Buddhist Learning Center and monastery in Washington Township, New Jersey. At one point during the 20th century, there was a Kalmyk Buddhist temple in Belgrade, Serbia.

The word Kalmyk means 'those who remained'. Its origin is unknown but this name was known centuries before a large part of the Kalmyks moved back from the Volga River to Dzhungaria in the 18th century.

There are three cultural subgroups within the Kalmyk nation: Turguts, Durbets (Durwets), and Buzavs (Oirats, who joined the Russian Cossacks), as well as some villages of Hoshouts and Zungars. The Durbets subgroup includes the Chonos tribe (literally meaning "a tribe of the wolf", also called "Shonos", "Chinos", "A-Shino", or "A-Chino").

Kalmykia staged the 2006 World Chess Championship between Veselin Topalov and Vladimir Kramnik.

Most of the Republic of Kalmykia lies in the Caspian Depression, a low-lying region down to 27 meters (89 ft) below sea level.

== See also ==
- Buddhism in Kalmykia
- Music of Kalmykia
- Geden Sheddup Choikorling Monastery
- Burkhan Bakshin Altan Sume
- Kumykia
