= Eurasia Canal =

Proposed 700-kilometre-long canal

Coordinates: 45°29′30″N 44°36′10″E

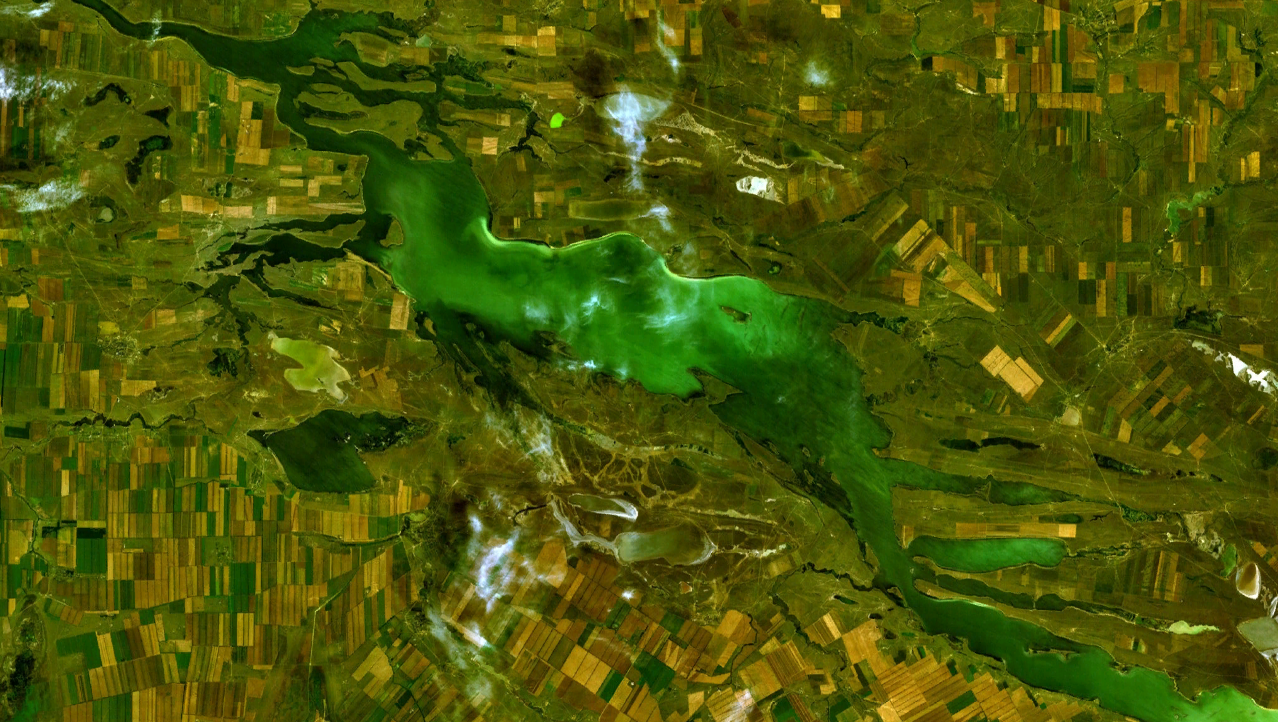
Lake Manych-Gudilo is midway on the course of the proposed Eurasia Canal

The Eurasia Canal (Russian: Канал "Евразия", Kanal "Evraziya") is a proposed 700-kilometre-long (430 mi) canal connecting the Caspian Sea to the Black Sea along the Kuma-Manych Depression. Currently, a chain of lakes and reservoirs and the shallow irrigation Kuma–Manych Canal are found along this route. If completed the canal would also link several landlocked countries in Asia with the open seas through the Bosphorus. If completed, the Eurasian Canal will become the second longest canal in the world after the Grand Canal in China (1776 km long).

The canal is intended to provide a shorter route for shipping than the existing Volga–Don Canal system of waterways; it would also require fewer locks (or lower-rise locks) than the Volga-Don route.

Manych Ship Canal is the existing canal system that would be the likely route for the Eurasian Canal.

== Potential shipping route ==
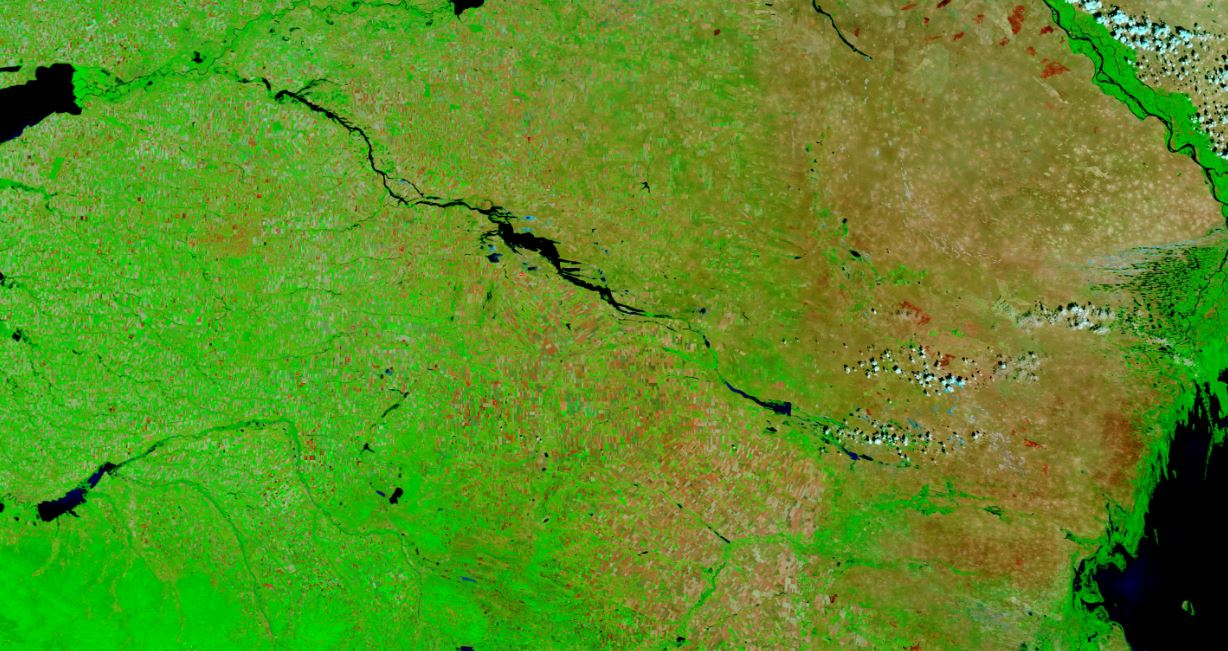
Kuma-Manych Depression and Manych River from space. Upper left is the eastern tip of the Sea of Azov and lower right is the Caspian Sea. Upper right is the lower Volga and lower left is a reservoir on the Kuban River. Note that the Manych joins the Don River before that river reaches the Sea of Azov.

The route of the canal, as usually proposed, would follow the thalweg (the lowest-ground line) of the Kuma-Manych Depression. From the Caspian Sea westward, the canal route would follow:

- The lower course of the Kuma River (a shallow, partly dry river which flows toward the Caspian), on the border of Dagestan and Kalmykia
- A new canal through the steppe, possible following a section of the present Kuma–Manych Canal (an irrigation canal bringing water from the Terek River and the upper Kuma River to the East Manych),
- The East Manych,
- The West Manych, which flows toward the lower Don via Lake Manych-Gudilo, Proletarsk, Vesyolovsk, and Ust'-Manych Reservoirs. A shallow (1.3 m) navigable waterway already exists there.
- From the confluence point of the West Manych and the Don, the ships would follow the same route as used by the existing Caspian-to-Black Sea navigation, i.e., less than 100 km down the Don until its fall into the Sea of Azov, and then across the Sea of Azov and the Strait of Kerch into the Black Sea.

=== Locks ===
As the highest point of this route is only 27 metres (89 ft) above the level of the Sea of Azov and 54 metres (177 ft) above that of the Caspian Sea, the preliminary design presented by the Hydraulic Facilities Safety Expert Center "GIDROTEKHEXPERTIZA" (Экспертный центр по безопасности гидротехнических сооружений "Гидротехэкспертиза") proposes the construction of three to four low-rise ship locks on the western slope and three mid-rise or six low-rise locks on the eastern slope. The option involving the construction of six low-rise locks on the eastern slope of the watershed can significantly reduce the volume of earthwork and lower by one-third the need for freshwater, which is precalculated as approximately 1.5 cubic kilometres (0.36 cu mi).

This compares with the 13 locks of the existing Volga–Don Canal, where ships use nine locks to rise 88 metres (289 ft) from the Volga to the canal's highest point, and then four more locks to descend 44 metres (144 ft) to the Don's Tsimlyansk Reservoir.

=== Water supply ===
The Kuma-Manych depression area is quite arid, with annual precipitation no more than 400 millimetres (16 in) (in the western section) and 200 millimetres (7.9 in) (in the eastern section). To operate this shipping canal with locks, a significant additional supply of freshwater would be necessary. Three options for its provision are being considered:

- The route of the abandoned Volga-Chogray Canal across Kalmykia. Construction of this canal was started in the late Soviet era, but later abandoned. This time, it is proposed to reduce water loss by building a concrete-lined canal, or possibly even a pipeline, along this route.
- Pumping water from the mouths of the Volga to the eastern end of the canal (presumably, along a pipeline that would follow the Caspian coast), and then uphill along the eastern section of the canal.
- Increasing the water flow of the irrigation canals that already bring Kuban and Terek water to the West and East Manych, such as the Nevinnomyssk Canal, the Terek-Kuma Canal and the Kuma–Manych Canal. The idea is to make better use of the overflowing water during floods on the Kuban and Terek. The design of this plan predicts that this would alleviate the problem of frequent inundations on these rivers.

== History ==
The Soviet government decided to construct the Manych Waterway connecting the Black and Caspian Seas via the Kuma-Manych Depression in May 1932. In the same year construction started in the West Manych River Valley. According to the 1936 construction project, the shipping route consisted of three sections. The first, western, section from the Don River to the Chogray Reservoir on the East Manych, 448 kilometres (278 mi) long, was planned as a cascade of reservoirs; the second section – from the Chogray Dam to the Kuma River – was to be built as a canal with a water depth of 3 metres (9.8 ft), bottom width of 67 metres (220 ft), and length of 73 kilometres (45 mi). The third, eastern, section, 150 kilometres (93 mi) long, was intended as a free-flow navigable and irrigation canal (along the lower course of the Kuma) reaching a port on the Caspian coast. Of these three sections, only the first was ever built.

By 1941, the cascade of dams on the West Manych was completed. It created three reservoirs, in the following (east to west) order: Proletarsk (Proletarskoye) Reservoir (Пролетарское водохранилище), 150 km long, Vesyolovsk (Vesyolovskoe) Reservoir (Весёловское водохранилище), 100 kilometres (62 mi) long, and Ust'-Manych (Ust'-Manychskoye) Reservoir (Усть-Манычское водохранилище), 62 kilometres (39 mi) long. The uppermost reservoir of the cascade, the Proletarskoye, is in fact connected with the source of the Western Manych, Lake Manych-Gudilo, the Proletarsk dam raising the water level in the lake. This system of reservoirs and ship locks creates the so-called Manych Waterway, 329 kilometres (204 mi) long but only 1.3 metres (4 ft 3 in) deep. It is still used for shipping, but on a very minor scale.

With the outbreak of the Second World War further construction of the Manych Ship Canal was suspended. After the war, destroyed or damaged dams and locks of the shipping canal were reconstructed, but the plans for continuing the construction further eastward were canceled, since the much deeper Volga–Don Canal was built instead, and the existing demand for freight transport did not justify a second canal between the Caspian and the Black/Azov Sea basins.

Further east, on the East Manych River (which flows east), the Chogray Reservoir, 48.8 kilometres (30.3 mi) long, was constructed in 1969–1973, but at that time the focus was on irrigation, not shipping.

== Recent developments ==
The Russian government's interest in improvement of the waterways between the Caspian basin and that of the Azov and Black Seas – which may or may not involve the Eurasia Canal route – is due to an increasing volume of cargo traffic between the Volga-Caspian basin and European countries, as well as the inadequacy of existing facilities on the Volga–Don Canal for handling the expected cargo flows. The proponents of the project refer to a study of freight shipping in southern Russia by the Central Research Institute of Economy and Water Transport Exploitation (Центральный научно-исследовательский институт экономики и эксплуатации водного транспорта (ЦНИИЭВТ), TsNIIEVT), a research center of Russia's Ministry of Transport. This study predicts significant growth in the demand for freight transportation, in particular for liquid cargoes, between the Caspian region and the ports of southern and central Europe. The study also suggests that a significant amount of cargo shipped between the Asian countries and western Europe can be redirected to the canal as well.

On June 15, 2007, at the 17th Foreign Investors’ Council Meeting in Ust-Kamenogorsk, President Nursultan Nazarbayev of Kazakhstan proposed the Eurasia Canal project to build a canal connecting the Caspian and Black Seas. The project was estimated to cost US$6 billion and take 10 years to complete.

If built, the nearly 700 kilometres (430 mi) Eurasia Canal would be four times longer than the Suez Canal and eight times longer than the Panama Canal. President Nazarbayev stated that the canal would make Kazakhstan a maritime power and benefit many other Central Asian nations as well. Russia has proposed an alternative plan to upgrade the existing Volga–Don Canal.

In June 2009 the President of Kalmykia, Kirsan Ilyumzhinov, signed a protocol of intent with the Chinese SINOHYDRO Corporation about cooperating in the construction of the Manych Ship Canal – Eurasia Canal.

The most probable technical parameters of the Eurasia Canal are: 6.5 metres (21 ft) depth, 110 metres (360 ft) width and more than 75 million tons per year of traffic capacity. The canal is envisaged for the passage of vessels with a freight-carrying capacity up to 10,000 tonnes (9,800 long tons; 11,000 short tons). This width and depth would put the canal on a par with the Chesapeake and Delaware Canal.

== Alternatives ==
There are a number of alternative projects by now for the Caspian Sea to receive a canal with ocean connection. One is the proposed New Dawn Canal. This alternative targets a maximum carbon capture and storage scheme with sea-water farming. On the border of the canal, saltmarshes could be extended and sea-water farming could store great amounts of carbon in the soil. In this respect, it is the opposite of other proposed canals which are mainly about exporting untapped oil-reserves around the Caspian Sea.

== Literature ==
- Болаев Араша Валериевич "Предварительная оценка влияния завершения строительства Манычского судоходного канала (канала "Евразия") на социально-экономическое развитие Юга России" - Вестник Института комплексных исследований аридных территорий, 2008 №2 (Arasha Bolaev "Preliminary estimation of influence of completion of construction of the Manych Ship Canal (the Eurasia Canal) on the socio-economic development of the South of Russia", Herald of the Institute of Complex Research of Arid Territories, 2008 №2)
