= Kuma–Manych Canal =

Irrigation channel in Stavropol Krai, Russia

- Location: Stavropol Krai, Russia

Geography
- Direction: North
- Start point: Kuma River
- End point: Manych River
- Beginning coordinates: 44°48′08″N 44°39′41″E
- Ending coordinates: 45°28′29″N 44°37′42″E

The Kuma–Manych Canal (Russian: Кумо–Манычский канал) is an irrigation canal in Russia's Stavropol Krai. The canal, completed in 1965, runs across the Kuma–Manych Depression, connecting the Kuma River, which flows into the Caspian Sea, with the East Manych River, which also flows toward the Caspian, but dries out long before reaching it. The East Manych River should not be confused with the West Manych, a tributary of the Don which flows into the Sea of Azov and connects to the Black Sea.

The Kuma–Manych Canal begins near the village of Novokumsky on the Kuma River, between the cities of Budyonnovsk and Neftekumsk. Its starting point is at a small reservoir on the Kuma River (44°48′10″N 44°39′40″E) into which the Terek–Kuma Canal (Терско–Кумский канал; completed 1958) brings the Terek water from the south. From there, the Kuma–Manych Canal carries water first toward the north-east, and then toward the north-west, ending at the southern shore of the Chogray Reservoir on the East Manych River; Google Maps show a small peninsula, formed by the alluvial deposits at the canal's end point there (45°27′50″N 44°37′33″E).

== Other proposed canals in the area ==
In June 2007, the leaders of Kazakhstan suggested that Russia build a much deeper canal (dubbed Eurasia Canal) along the bottom of the Kuma–Manych Depression, suitable for large-ship navigation between the Caspian Sea and the Black Sea. The Kazakhstan Academy of Sciences started conducting a review of possible routes.

== See also ==
- Volga–Don Canal which links the Caspian Sea and Sea of Azov for purposes of transportation.
