= Veselovsky Reservoir =

Reservoir in Rostov Oblast, Russia

- Весёловское водохранилище (Russian)
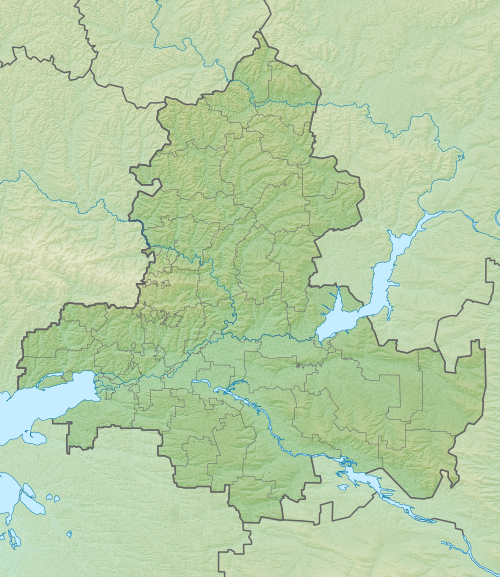
- Location within Rostov Oblast Location within Russia
- Location: Rostov Oblast Russia
- Coordinates: 47.05°N 41.09°E
- Built: 1932 to 1936

Ramsar Wetland
- Official name: Veselovskoye Reservoir
- Designated: 13 August 1994
- Reference no.: 672

Veselovsky Reservoir (aka Veselovskoye Reservoir) is a reservoir on the western Manych River in Rostov-on-Don, Rostov Oblast. Combined with the Proletarsky Reservoir directly upstream, the pair is also referred to as the Manychysky Reservoirs, built between 1932 and 1936 to provide longstanding river flow. The Veselovsky Reservoir is currently used for irrigation, fisheries, water traffic and power generation.

== Physical geography ==
The 500 kilometres (310 mi) long shoreline of the Veselovsky Reservoir is rugged, with gulfs formed by flooded gullies. The northern bank is steep, reaching the height of 19 to 24 metres (62 to 79 ft) above sea level and 9 to 14 metres (30 to 46 ft) above the water surface of the reservoir. The hydrographic web is weakly developed.

The normal retaining level (NRL) of the reservoir is more than 7 meters. At full the water storage level is 190 million cubic metres (6.7×10^{9} cu ft) with a water surface of 244 square kilometres (94 sq mi).

=== Climate ===
The reservoir is found in a continental moderate climate. The average annual rainfall is 522 millimetres (20.6 in).

=== Communities ===
The village of Veselij and the hamlets of Karkashev, Russkij, Dalnij, and Stepnoy Kurgan are located on the banks of the Veselovsky Reservoir.

== Flora and fauna ==
The reservoir contains 33 species of fish and fishing is primarily concentrated on bream, Rutilus lacustris, and zander. There are 3 species of amphibians, 8 species of reptiles, 19 species of rare and endangered birds, and 2 red-listed species of mammals registered on the territory of the reservoir and nearby areas. The Veselovsky Reservoir has a wetlands status that is of international importance and is secured by the Ramsar Convention on Wetlands.
