= Lake Tsagan-Khak =

Lake in Kalmykia, Russia

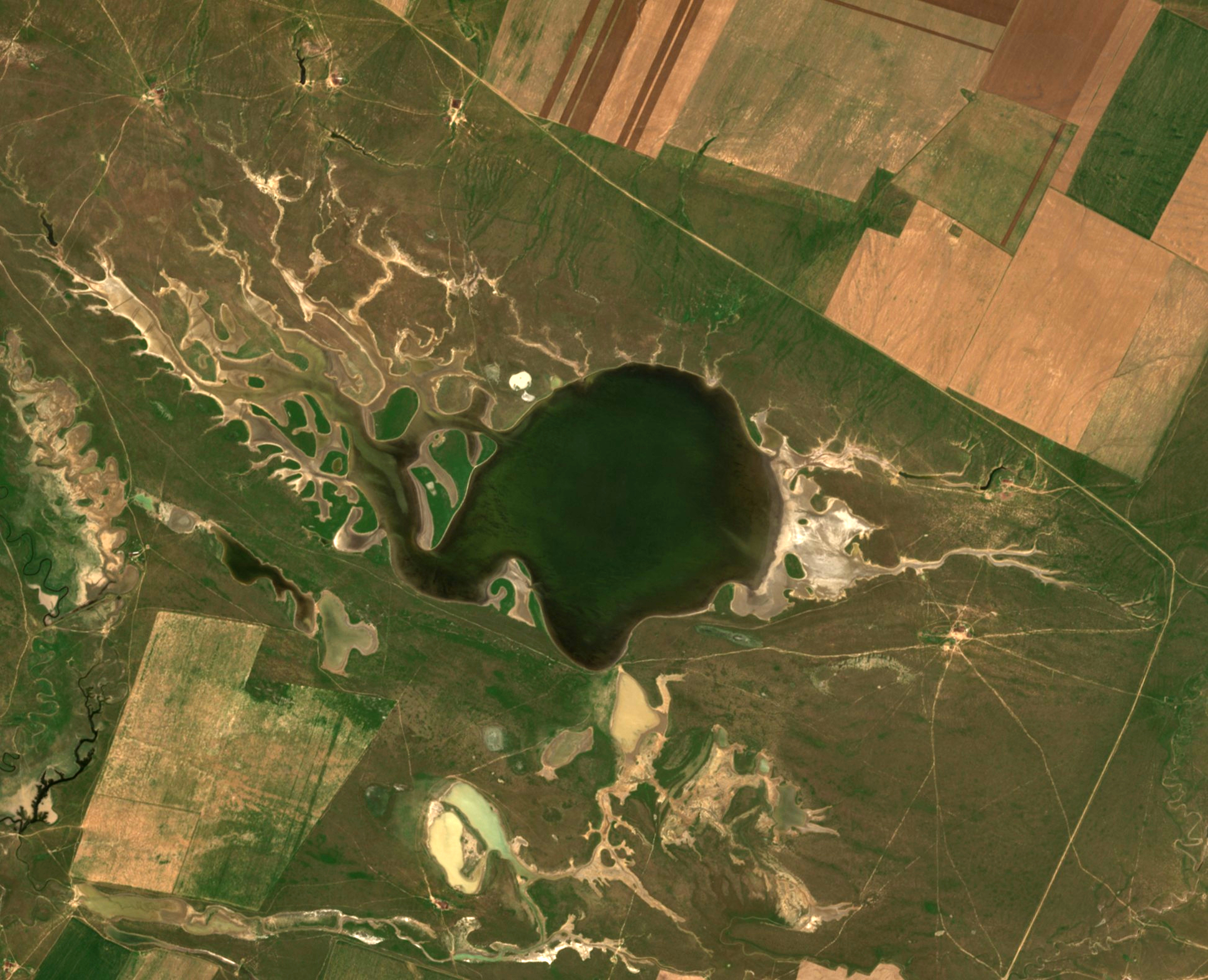
- Sentinel-2 image (2021)

- Location within Russia
- Location: Republic of Kalmykia
- Coordinates: 46°00′05″N 44°01′29″E

Tsagan-Khak Lake (Russian: о́зеро Цага́н-Хак) is located in the Russian Republic of Kalmykia. It is the third-largest lake in the republic (19,9 km²). Several industries are attached to the lake, including fishing, textiles, and plastics manufacturing.
