= Chogray Reservoir =

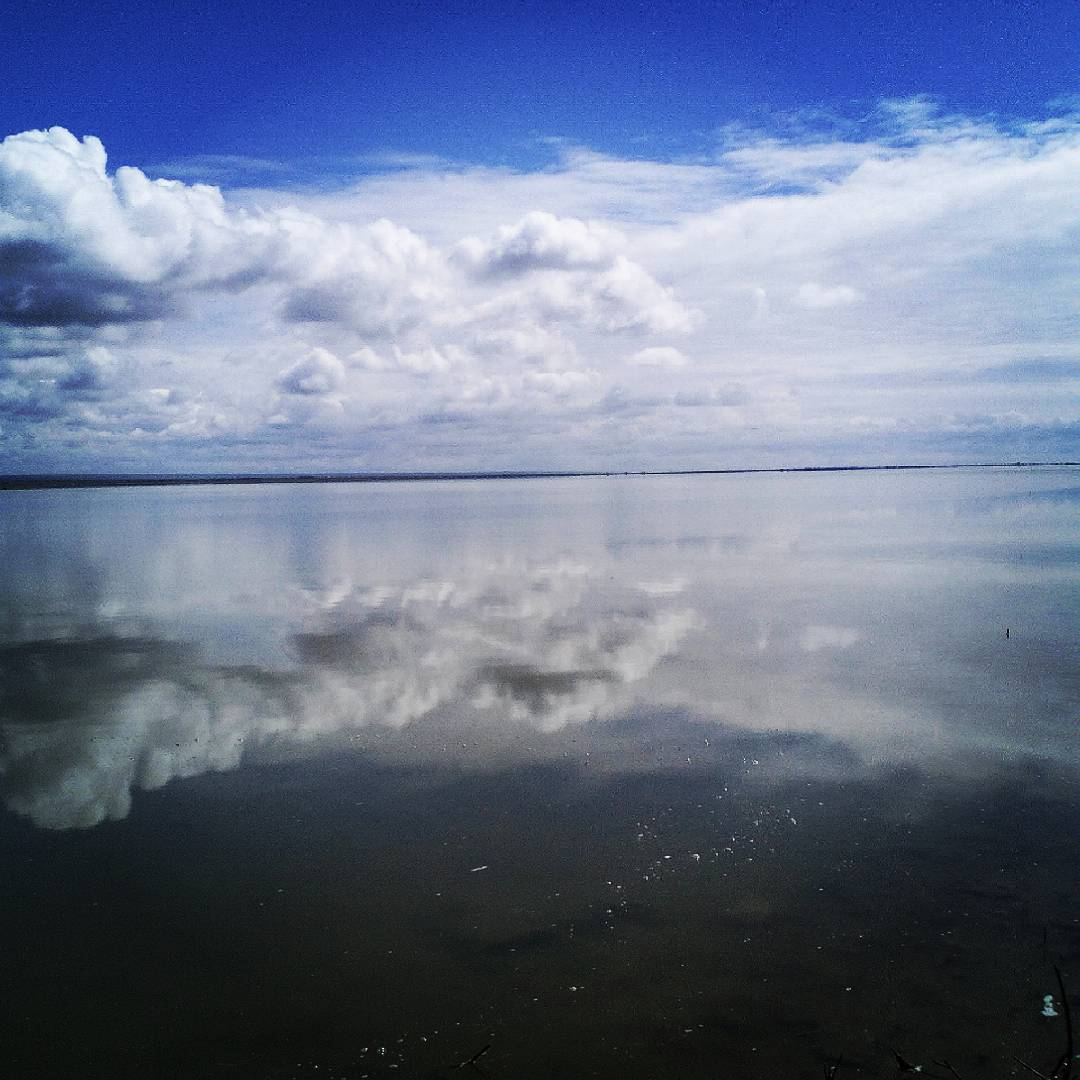

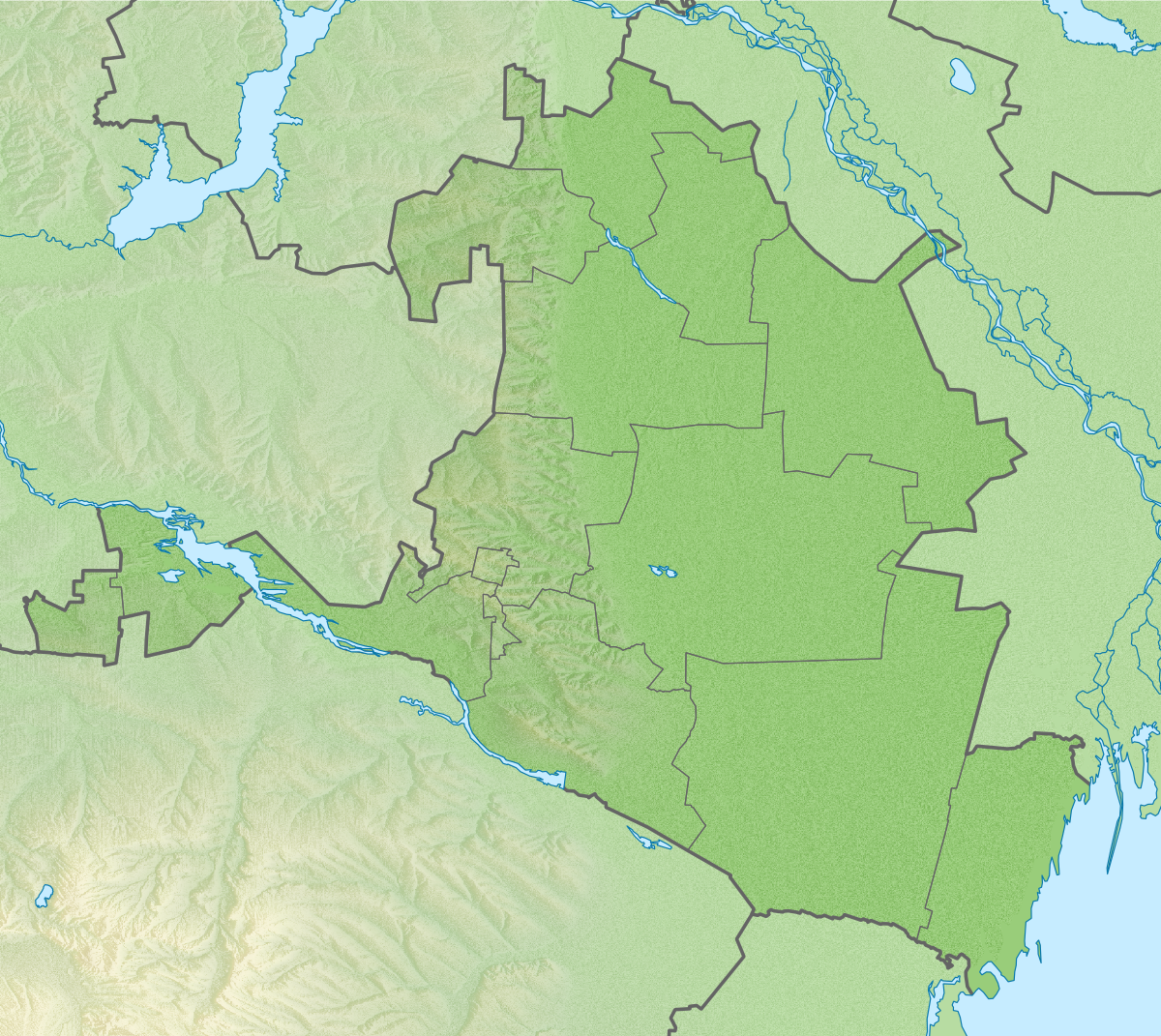
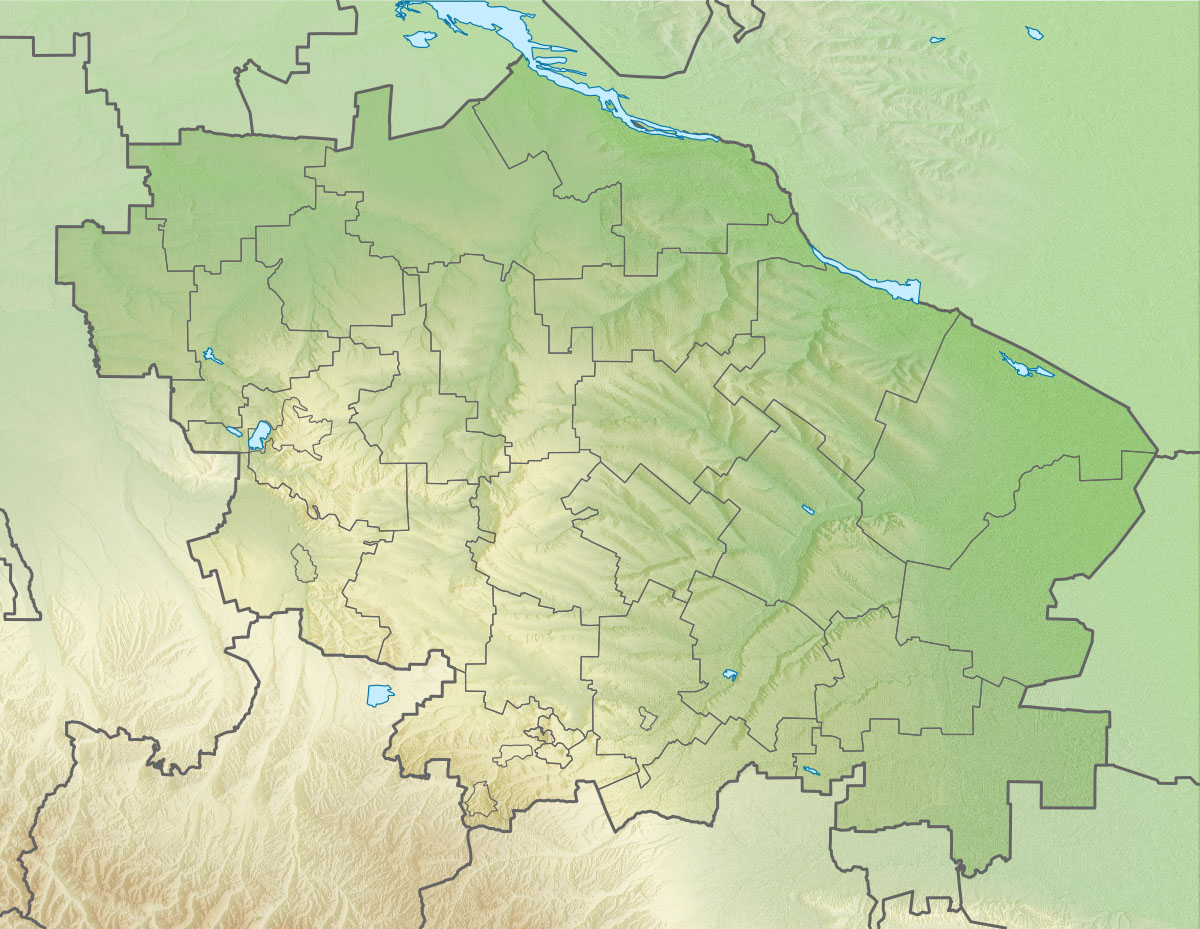
- Location within Kalmykia Location within Stavropol Krai Location within European Russia
- Coordinates: 45°30′N 44°40′E
- Type: reservoir
- Primary inflows: Kuma–Manych Canal, minor local rivers
- Primary outflows: East Manych
- Basin countries: Russia
- Max. length: 49 km (30 mi)
- Water volume: 0.7 km^{3} (570,000 acre⋅ft)

The Chogray Reservoir (Russian: Чограйское водохранилище, romanized: Chograyskoye vodokhranilishche) is an artificial reservoir on the East Manych River on the border of Stavropol Krai and Kalmykia in southern Russia.

The reservoir, 49 km long, was constructed in 1969–1973, primarily to satisfy the demands of local irrigated farming. Its area is 185 square km, volume 0.7 cubic km. Besides capturing water naturally brought by the tributaries of the East Manych River, the reservoir receives water from the Terek River and the Kuma River over the Kuma–Manych Canal, which was completed a few years before the reservoir.

Later on, another irrigation canal – the Chernyye Zemli Main Canal (Черноземельский магистральный канал, Chernozemelsky magistralny kanal) was built, taking water from the Chogray Reservoir further east and north, into Kalmykia.

In 2008, after almost 40 years of operation, the reservoir was reported as in dire need of maintenance, as were many other reservoirs of its age in the area. Under certain conditions the waters are polluted by blooms of toxic cyanobacteria (blue-gree algae).

As the East Manych (and, thus, the Chogray Reservoir) is not connected in a navigable way with any other body of water (although that may change if the Eurasia Canal is constructed), delivering a boat, or any other large floating installation to the Chogray Reservoir would be a non-trivial task. Such an operation was undertaken in 1976, when two large floating pumping units, weighing 320 and 280 metric tons, respectively, had to be delivered to the reservoir for use by the local irrigators. They were taken by boat from the Don up the West Manych River waterway to Lake Manych-Gudilo – the end of the existing navigable waterway, – from where they were transported 85 km overland using special heavy trailers. Thirty years later, that story was still remembered locally.
