= Kalaus (river) =

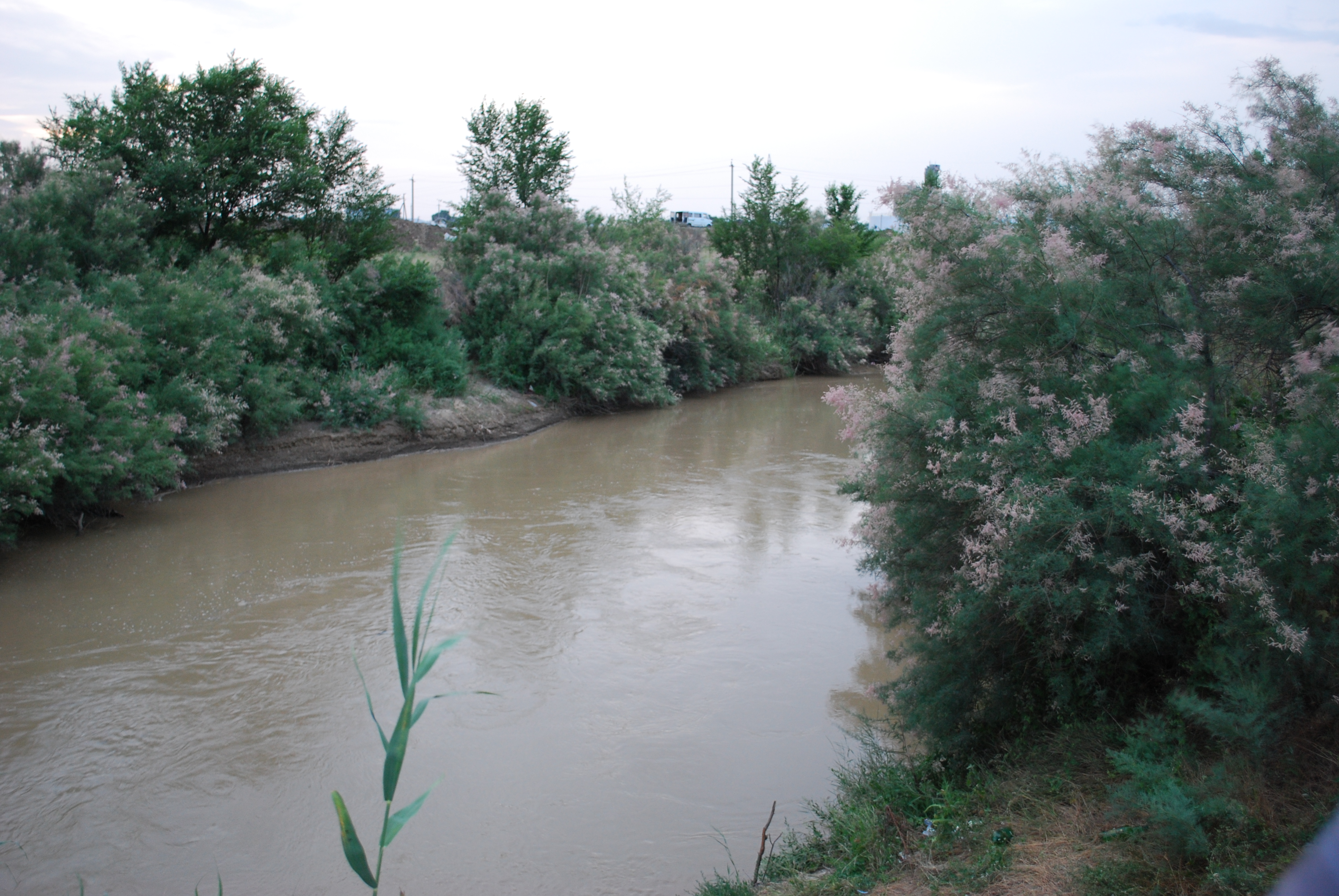

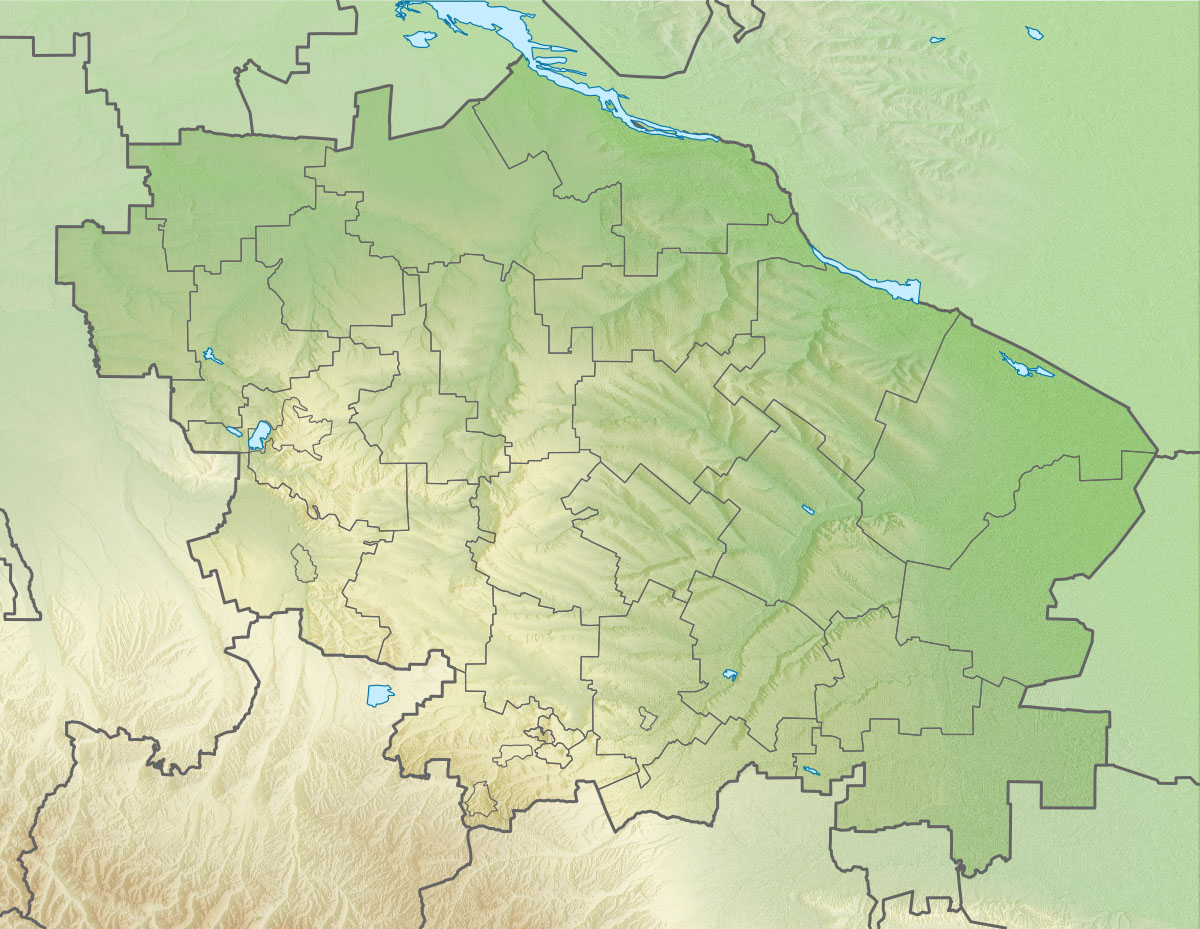
- Location within Stavropol Krai Location within European Russia

Physical characteristics
- Mouth: Manych
  - coordinates: 45.8489°N 43.3768°E
- Length: 436 km (271 mi)
- Basin size: 9,700 km^{2} (3,700 sq mi)

Basin features
- Progression: Manych→ Don→ Sea of Azov

The Kalaus (Russian: Калаус) is a north-flowing river on the Black Sea-Caspian Steppe of southern Russia, in Stavropol Krai. It is 436 kilometres (271 mi) long, and has a drainage basin of 9,700 square kilometres (3,700 sq mi). It is a tributary of the Manych. Formerly, when it reached the Manych, part of its waters would flow east and part west. Today a low dam blocks flow into the east Manych.
