= Yegorlyk =

River in Russia

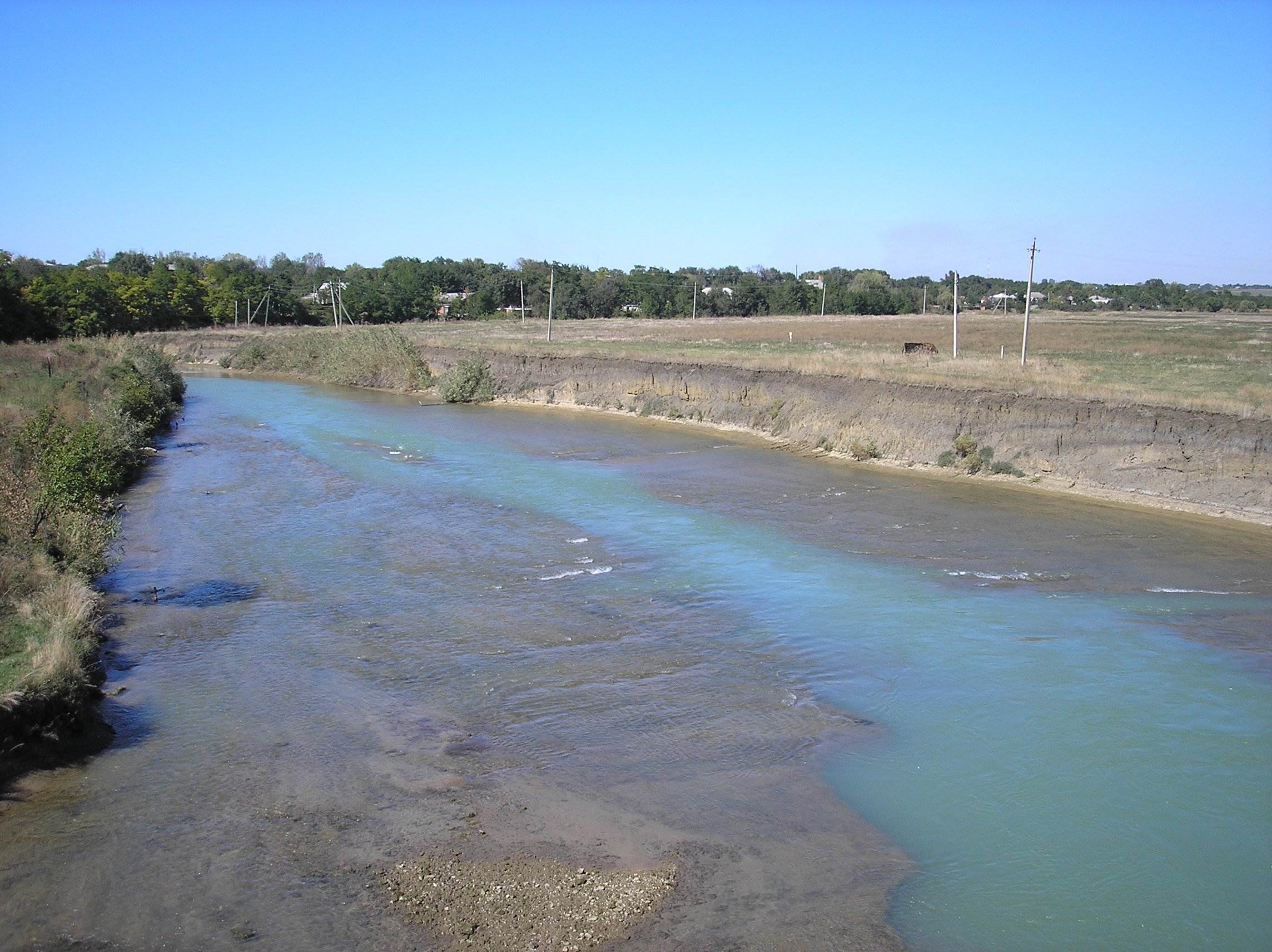
- The Yegorlyk near Novotroitskaya

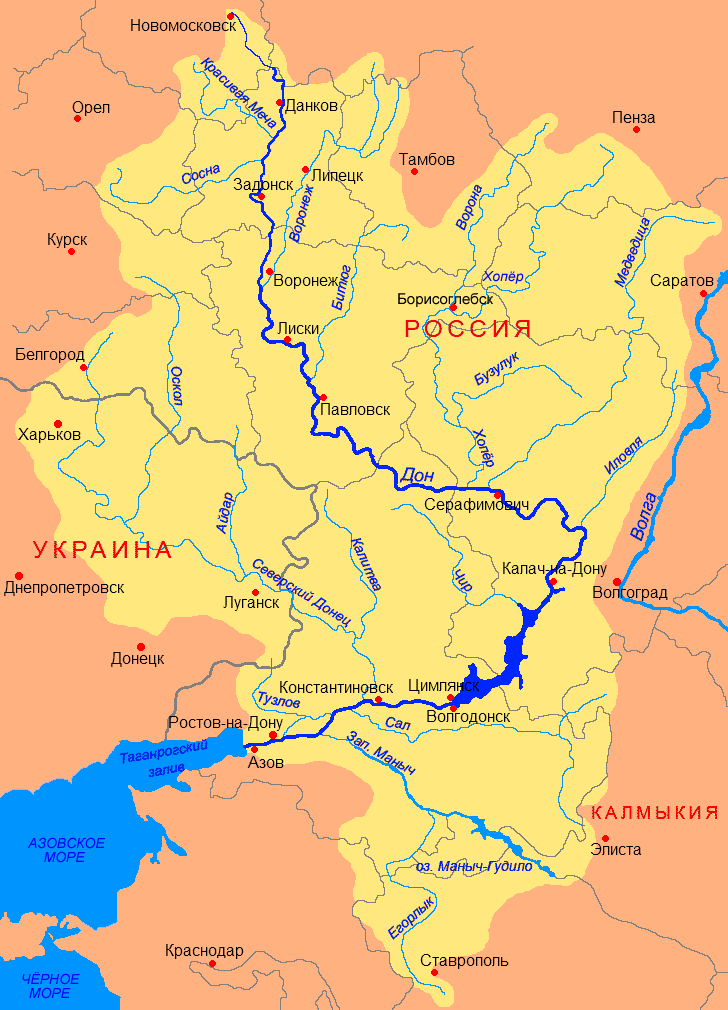
- The Yegorlyk is the southernmost river in the Don basin

Physical characteristics
- Source
  - location: 30 km (19 mi) south of Stavropol
  - coordinates: 44°46′02″N 42°04′43″E
- Mouth: Manych
  - location: Proletarskoye Reservoir
  - coordinates: 46°32′58″N 41°51′03″E
- Length: 448 km (278 mi)
- Basin size: 15,000 km^{2} (5,800 sq mi)

Basin features
- Progression: Manych→ Don→ Sea of Azov

The Yegorlyk or Greater Yegorlyk (Russian: Егорлык or Большой Егорлык) is a north-flowing river on the Black Sea-Caspian Steppe of southern Russia, a left tributary of the Manych. It is 448 kilometres (278 mi) long, and has a drainage basin of 15,000 square kilometres (5,800 sq mi). Since the Manych flows into the Don it is the southernmost tributary of the Don, if one excludes the Kalaus.

== Etymology ==
The name of the river comes from Turkic agri, meaning "curved". Its Russian name was influenced by the given name Egor. Its name in Kalmyk is Oirat: Егорлг, romanized: Yegorlg, [jɛɡərˈlək]).

== Fauna ==
Several introduced species are present in the Yegorlyk catchment area. This includes the spotted forked catfish (Ictalurus punctatus, "Channel catfish"), which was imported for fish farming from the United States (Arkansas) in the 1970s and subsequently also spread outside the fish farms. Another fish is the gobioninae species Romanogobio pentatrichus, which migrated independently from the Kuban, its original distribution area, via the Nevinnomyssk Canal.

== Usage and infrastructure ==
There is no navigation on Jegorlyk river.

The entire length of the river flows through intensively farmed areas, for whose irrigation the water is used. The largest part is taken from the Novotroitskoye Reservoir via the Right Yegorlyk Canal (Prawo-Jegorlykski Canal) .

Several small hydropower plants have been built on the upper reaches of the river, which are now operated by the ['RusHydro]' 'Kuban Hydro Power Plant Cascade (Kubanski kaskad GES)' ':

- Sengilejewskoje hydropower plant ( Sengilejewskaja GES , output 15; MW, built 1949-1953 at the outlet of the Newinnomyssk Canal to Jegorlyk)
- Jegorlyk hydropower plant ( Jegorlykskaja GES , 30 MW, 1956–1962)
- Hydropower plant Jegorlyk-2 ( Jegorlykskaja GES-2 , 14.2 MW, 1994-2010)
- Novotroizk hydropower plant ( Nowotroizkaja GES , 3.68 MW, 1950–1953)

The construction of the Jegorlyk-2 ( Jegorlykskaja GES-2 ) hydropower plant, which started in 1994, was initially delayed due to financial difficulties, but was resumed in 2005 after being taken over by RusHydro and completed at the end of 2010. The reservoir of the Novotroizk hydropower plant is also used for the cooling water supply of the thermal power plants in Stavropol (Stawropolskaja GRES) , which is operated by the OGK-2 and with a capacity of 2400 MW is the largest in the North Caucasus.

A number of other reservoirs directly on the Jegorlyk or in its valley are used for fish farming, for example at Ptitschje north of Isobilny.

The upper reaches of Yegorlyk are crossed by a branch of the trunk road R217, which connects the regional capital Stavropol to the main road between Newinnomyssk and Kochubeyevskoye. The railway line from Kropotkin (station Kawkasskaja ) to Stavropol and Elista crosses the river below Novotroizkaja and Isobilny, the regional road R269 following the middle course on the left (Rostov-on-Don) Bataisk; - Stavropol near the village of Besopasnoye.
