= Nevinnomyssk Canal =

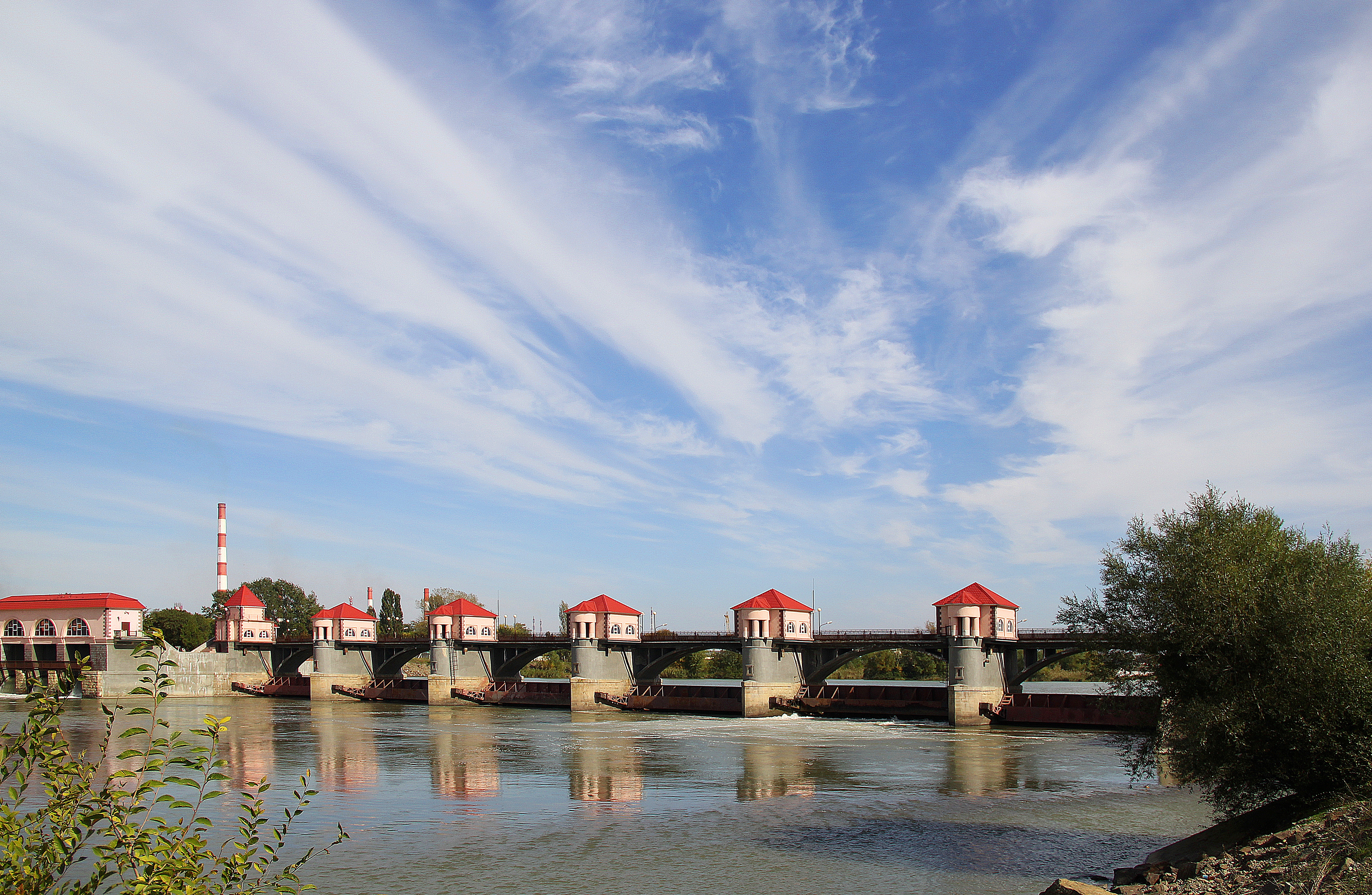
- Location: Stavropol Krai, Russia

Specifications
- Length: 49.2 km (30.6 miles)

Geography
- Start point: Kuban River
- End point: Yegorlyk River
- Beginning coordinates: 44°39′04″N 41°54′41″E
- Ending coordinates: 45°01′03″N 41°40′22″E

The Nevinnomyssk Canal (Russian: Невинномысский канал, Nevinnomysskij kanal) is an irrigation canal in Stavropol Krai in Russia. It leads water from the Kuban River to the Yegorlyk River, which in turn drains north to the Manych River. The canal starts at a dam across the Kuban River at the town of Nevinnomyssk. It then runs about 33 km (21 mi) northwest parallel to the east bank of the Kuban. At the village of Tunnelnyy, about 25 km (16 mi) southwest of Stavropol where it is about 100 feet higher than the Kuban, it enters a 6 km (3.7 mi) north-tending tunnel to cross the divide between the Kuban and Yegorlyk basins and then goes about 8 km (5.0 mi) north to enter the Yegorlyk in two branches.

Construction work on the canal started in 1936, but was interrupted by World War II. Work resumed in 1944, and in 1948 the Nevinnomyssk Canal was put into service. It is 49.2 km (30.6 mi) long, and its maximum flow is 75 m³/s. Along the canal there are two hydroelectric powerstations – Svistukhinskaya and Sengileyevskaya.

== See also ==
- Great Stavropol Canal
