= Stavropol Krai =

First-level administrative division of Russia

Stavropol Krai Ставропольский край (Russian)
- Krai
- Flag Coat of arms

- Interactive map of Stavropol Krai
- Coordinates: 45°03′N 43°16′E
- Country: Russia
- Federal district: North Caucasian
- Economic region: North Caucasus
- Established: October 17, 1924
- Administrative center: Stavropol

Government
  - Body: Duma
  - Governor: Vladimir Vladimirov

Area
  - Total: 66,160 km^{2} (25,540 sq mi)
  - Rank: 45th

Population (2021 census)
  - Total: 2,907,593 ▲: 79.4% Russians; 4.7% Armenians; 2% Dargins; 1.3% Romani people; 0.8% Greeks; 0.8% Nogais; 6.8% other; 4.2% not stated
  - Estimate (2018): 2,800,674
  - Rank: 14th
  - Density: 43.95/km^{2} (113.8/sq mi)
  - Urban: 60.6%
  - Rural: 39.4%

GDP (nominal, 2024)
  - Total: ₽1.34 trillion (US$15.74 billion)
  - Per capita: ₽464,154 (US$5,446.47)
- Time zone: UTC+3 (MSK)
- ISO 3166 code: RU-STA
- License plates: 26, 126
- OKTMO ID: 07000000
- Official languages: Russian
- Website: http://www.stavregion.ru

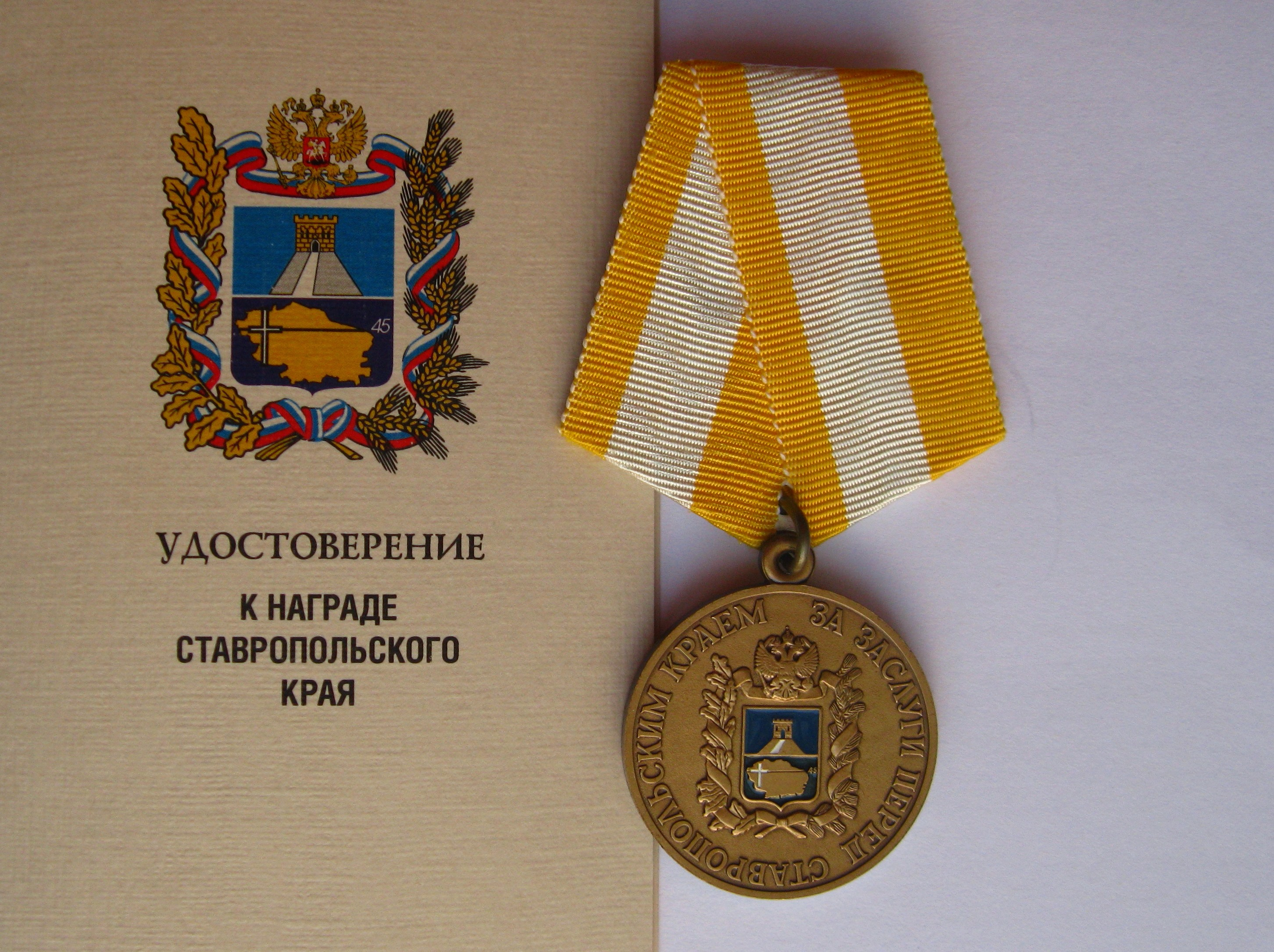
Medal "For Services to the Stavropol Krai"

Stavropol Krai, (Note: Russian: Ставропо́льский край, romanized: Stavropolʹskiy kray, IPA: [stəvrɐˈpolʲskʲɪj kraj]) also known as Stavropolye, (Note: Russian: Ставропо́лье, IPA: [stəvrɐˈpolʲɪ̯ə]) is a federal subject (a krai) of Russia. It is geographically located in the North Caucasus region in Southern Russia, and is administratively part of the North Caucasian Federal District. Stavropol Krai has a population of 2,907,593, according to the 2021 Census.

Stavropol is the largest city and the capital of Stavropol Krai, and Pyatigorsk is the administrative center of the North Caucasian Federal District.

Stavropol Krai is bordered by Krasnodar Krai to the west, Rostov Oblast to the north-west, Kalmykia to the north, Dagestan to the east, and Chechnya, North Ossetia–Alania, Kabardino-Balkaria and Karachay-Cherkessia to the south. It is one of the most multi-ethnic federal subjects in Russia, with thirty-three ethnic groups with more than 2,000 persons each combining a total population of 2,907,593. The western area of Stavropol Krai is considered part of the Kuban region, the traditional home of the Kuban Cossacks, with most of the krai's population living in the drainage basin of the Kuban River.

== Geography ==
Federal subjects in the Black Sea-Caspian area.
*Smaller areas along the north Caucasus are the republics: Karachay-Cherkessia, Kabardino-Balkaria, North Ossetia-Alania, Ingushetia, and Chechnya
*Yellow is the Southern Federal District and below it is the North Caucasian Federal District (light grey)

The krai encompasses the central part of the Fore-Caucasus and most of the northern slopes of Caucasus Major. It borders with Rostov Oblast, Krasnodar Krai, Kalmykia, Dagestan, Chechnya, North Ossetia–Alania, Kabardino-Balkaria, and Karachay–Cherkessia.

=== Climate ===
Most of Stavropol Krai experiences hot-summer humid continental climate (except for mountains). Winters are shorter and warmer than in most of Russia but still freezing and snowy: average January temperature is between −2 °C (28 °F) and −6 °C (21 °F). Summers are warm to hot with average July temperature of 20 °C (68 °F) to 25 °C (77 °F). Extremes range from −35 °C (−31 °F) in winter to 40 °C (104 °F) in summer. Average annual precipitation is 400 to 600 millimetres (16 to 24 in).

== History ==
The krai was established as North Caucasus Krai on October 17, 1924. After undergoing numerous administrative changes, it was renamed Ordzhonikidze Krai (Орджоникидзевский край), after Sergo Ordzhonikidze, in March 1937, and Stavropol Krai on January 12, 1943.

== Politics ==
During the Soviet period, the high authority in the region (krai) was shared between three persons: the First Secretary of the Stavropol Krai CPSU Committee (who in reality had the greatest authority), the Chairman of the Krai Soviet (legislative power), and the Chairman of the Krai Executive Committee (executive power).

In 1970–1978, Mikhail Gorbachev, a native of Stavropol Krai, occupied the position of the First Secretary of the Krai's Communist Party Committee. He left the region for Moscow in 1978, when he was promoted to a Secretary of the Central Committee of the CPSU, to become the Party's General Secretary and the nation's leader 7 years later. The region was also native to Yuri Andropov, who was also leader of the Soviet Union for a short time.

Since 1991, CPSU lost all the power, and the head of the Krai Administration, and eventually the governor was appointed/elected alongside the elected regional parliament.

The Charter of Stavropol Krai is the fundamental law of the region. The Legislative Assembly of Stavropol Krai is the province's regional standing legislative (representative) body. The Legislative Assembly exercises its authority by passing laws, resolutions, and other legal acts and by supervising the implementation and observance of the laws and other legal acts passed by it. The highest executive body is the Krai Government, which includes territorial executive bodies such as district administrations, committees, and commissions that facilitate development and run the day-to-day matters of the province. The krai administration supports the activities of the Governor who is the highest official and acts as a guarantor of the observance of the krai Charter in accordance with the Constitution of Russia.

== Economy ==
Large companies in the region include Stavrolen, Arnest, Concern Enorgomera, Nevinomiskiy Azot, Stavropolskiy Gres.

=== Agriculture ===
Irrigated agriculture is well-developed in the region. As of the beginning of 2001, Stavropol Krai had 3,361 km of irrigation canals, of which 959 km were lined (i.e., had concrete or stone walls, rather than merely soil walls, to reduce the loss of water).

Among the major irrigation canals are:

- Nevinnomyssk Canal (Невинномысский канал), the trunk of the Kuban–Yegorlyk Irrigation System.
- The Great Stavropol Canal (Большой Ставропольский канал), transporting water from the Kuban River eastward across the entire krai.
- The Terek-Kuma Canal and Kuma–Manych Canal, transporting water from the Terek River via the Kuma River to the East Manych River.

== Demographics ==
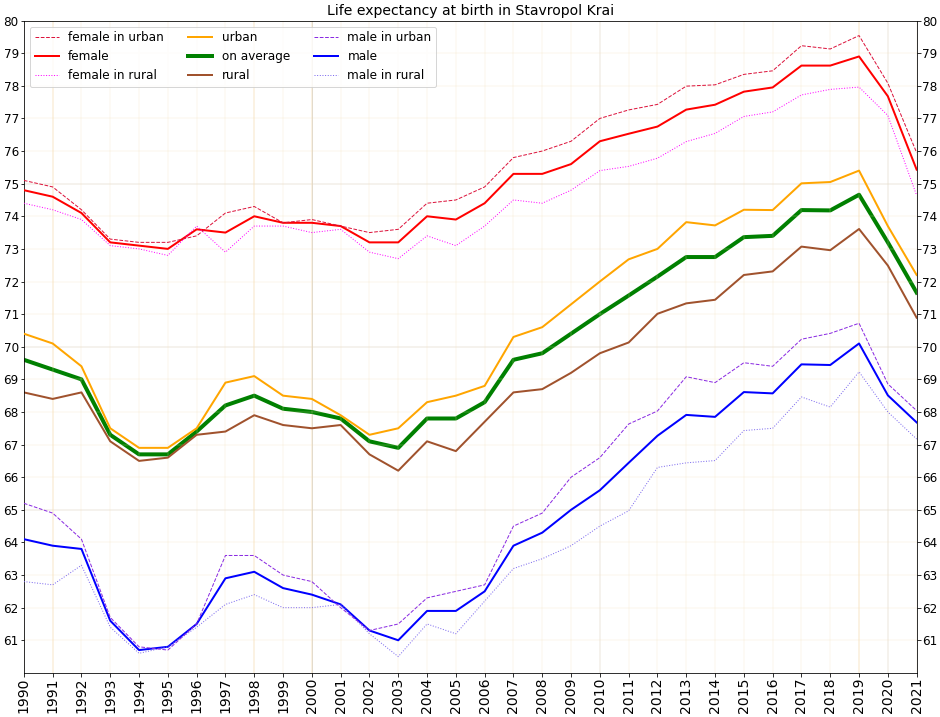
Life expectancy at birth in Stavropol Krai

According to the 2021 Census the Krai's population was 2,907,593, up from 2,786,281 in the 2010 Census and further up from 2,410,379 recorded in the 1989 Census. The population of the krai is concentrated in the drainage basins of the Kuban River and of the Kuma River, which used to be traditional Cossack land (see History of Cossacks). In modern Russia the Kuban Cossacks are now generally considered ethnic Russians, although their roots are in Ukraine (historically, their dialect was descended from that of Cherkasy). Other notable ethnic groups include Armenians (mostly Christian Hamsheni), Armeno-Tats, Pontic Greeks, Ukrainians, Turkmens as well as indigenous groups from the North Caucasian republics, especially from Chechnya, Ingushetia and Dagestan.

Vital statistics for 2024:

- Births: 23,395 (8.1 per 1,000)
- Deaths: 31,776 (11.0 per 1,000)

Total fertility rate (2024):
1.26 children per woman

Life expectancy (2021):
Total — 71.66 years (male — 67.68, female — 75.43)

=== Settlements ===
Largest cities or towns in Stavropol Krai 2010 Russian Census
Rank		Administrative Division	Pop.
1	Stavropol	City of krai significance of Stavropol	398,539
2	Pyatigorsk	City of krai significance of Pyatigorsk	142,511
3	Kislovodsk	City of krai significance of Kislovodsk	128,553
4	Nevinnomyssk	City of krai significance of Nevinnomyssk	118,360
5	Yessentuki	City of krai significance of Yessentuki	100,996
6	Mineralnye Vody	Mineralovodsky District	76,728
7	Georgiyevsk	Georgiyevsky District	72,153
8	Mikhaylovsk	Shpakovsky District	70,981
9	Budyonnovsk	Budyonnovsky District	64,624
10	Izobilny	Izobilnensky District	40,555

Historical population
Year	Pop.	±%
1897	873,301	—
1926	674,559	−22.8%
1939	1,950,887	+189.2%
1959	1,882,911	−3.5%
1970	2,305,780	+22.5%
1979	2,539,219	+10.1%
1989	2,857,188	+12.5%
2002	2,735,139	−4.3%
2010	2,786,281	+1.9%
2021	2,907,593	+4.4%
Source: Census data

=== Ethnic groups ===
The 2010 Census counted thirty-three ethnic groups of more than 2,000 persons each combining a total population of 2,786,281, making this federal subject one of the most multiethnic in Russia. The inhabitants identified themselves as belonging to more than 140 different ethnic groups, as shown in the following table:

Population	Ethnicity	Percentage of total population
2,309,460	Russians	79.4%
135,384	Armenians	4.7%
58,785	Dargins	2.0%
38,045	Romani people	1.3%
23,943	Greeks	0.8%
22,569	Nogais	0.8%
15,649	Karachay	0.5%
15,100	Turkmens	0.5%
13,996	Azerbaijanis	0.5%
13,779	Chechens	0.5%
12,724	Turks	0.4%
10,288	Avars	0.4%
9,895	Ukrainians	0.3%
8,354	Tatars	0.3%
97,793	Other Ethnicity	3.4%
121,829	Ethnicity not stated	4.2%

=== Religion ===
Religion in Stavropol Krai as of 2012 (Sreda Arena Atlas)
Russian Orthodoxy	43.9%
Other Orthodox	1%
Other Christians	6.1%
Islam	5.9%
Rodnovery and other native faiths	1.1%
Spiritual but not religious	19.2%
Atheism and irreligion	16.3%
Other and undeclared	6.5%

According to a 2012 survey 46.9% of the population of Stavropol Krai adheres to the Russian Orthodox Church, 7% are unaffiliated generic Christians, 2% are Muslims, 1% are either Orthodox Christian believers who do not belong to churches or members of non-Russian Orthodox bodies, and 1% of the population adheres to Rodnovery or local native faiths. In addition, 19% of the population declares to be "spiritual but not religious", 16% is atheist, and 7.1% follow other religions or did not give an answer to the question.

== Administrative divisions ==
Stavropol Krai is administratively divided into twenty-six districts (raions) and ten cities/towns. The districts are further subdivided into nine towns of district subordinance, seven urban-type settlements, and 284 rural okrugs and stanitsa okrugs.

== Notable people ==
- Yuri Andropov (1914–1984), the fourth General Secretary of the Communist Party of the Soviet Union.
- Mikhail Gorbachev (1931–2022), the last President of the Soviet Union.
- Joseph Trumpeldor (1880–1920), early Zionist activist and organizer of the Jewish Legion.
- Fyodor Kulakov (1918–1978), a former Soviet governor of Stavropol Krai
- Mikhail Lermontov (1814–1841), a Russian poet, novelist, playwright, and painter.
- Alexsandr Solzhenitsyn (1918–2008), a writer, author of The Gulag Archipelago, and winner of the Nobel Prize for Literature
- Piotr Mikhailovich Skarżyński (1744–1805), A Russian Major General. He served in the cavalry units of the Russian army and he commanded the Buzhan Cossacks during the Russo-Turkish War of 1787–1791, he showed heroism during the assault on Ochakov and the defense of the Kinburn fortress. He was awarded the Order of St. George.

== Sister regions ==
- Iowa, United States
