= Manych =

River in Russia

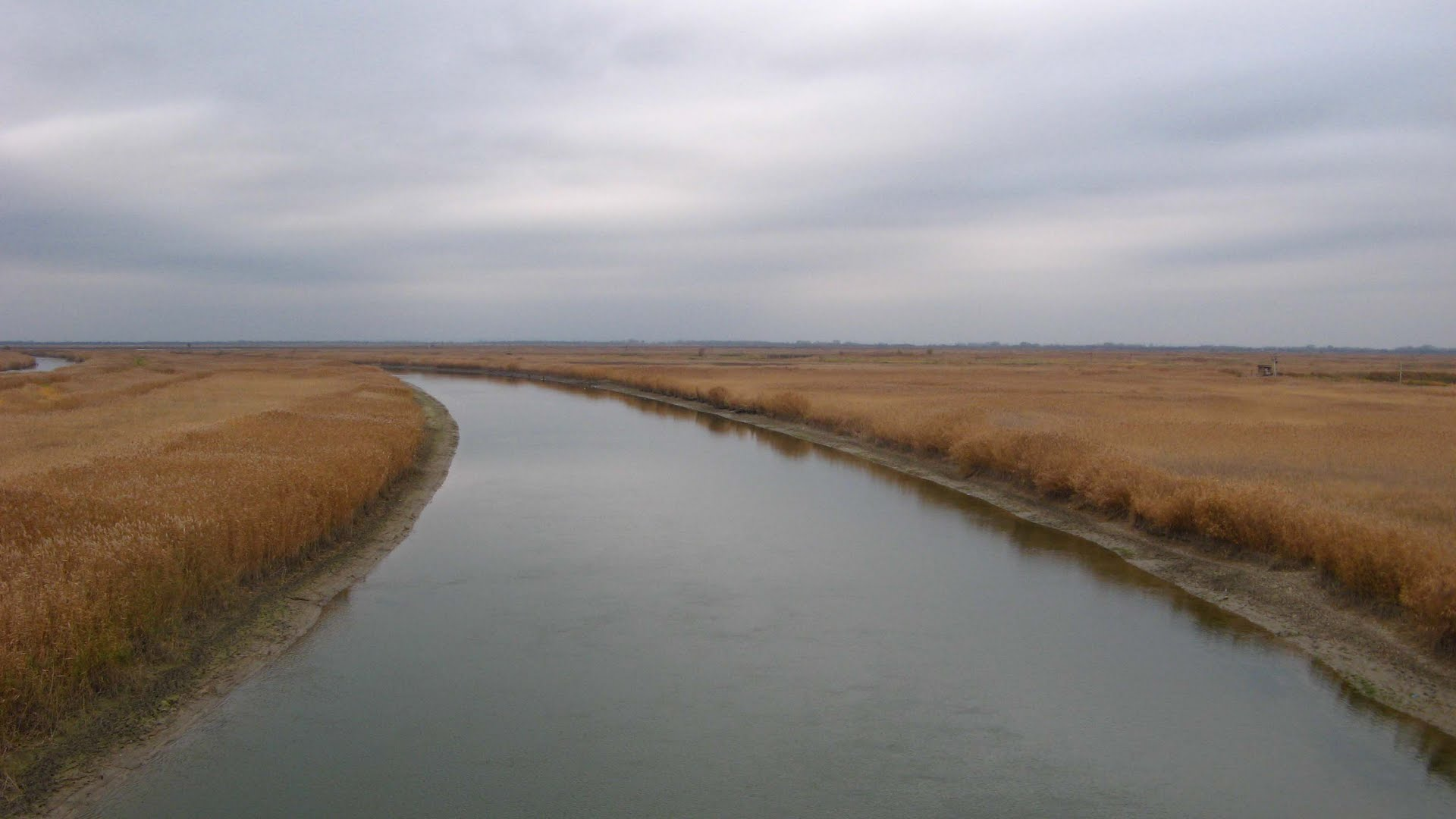
- Manych River near Rostov-on-Don - Volgodonsk highway

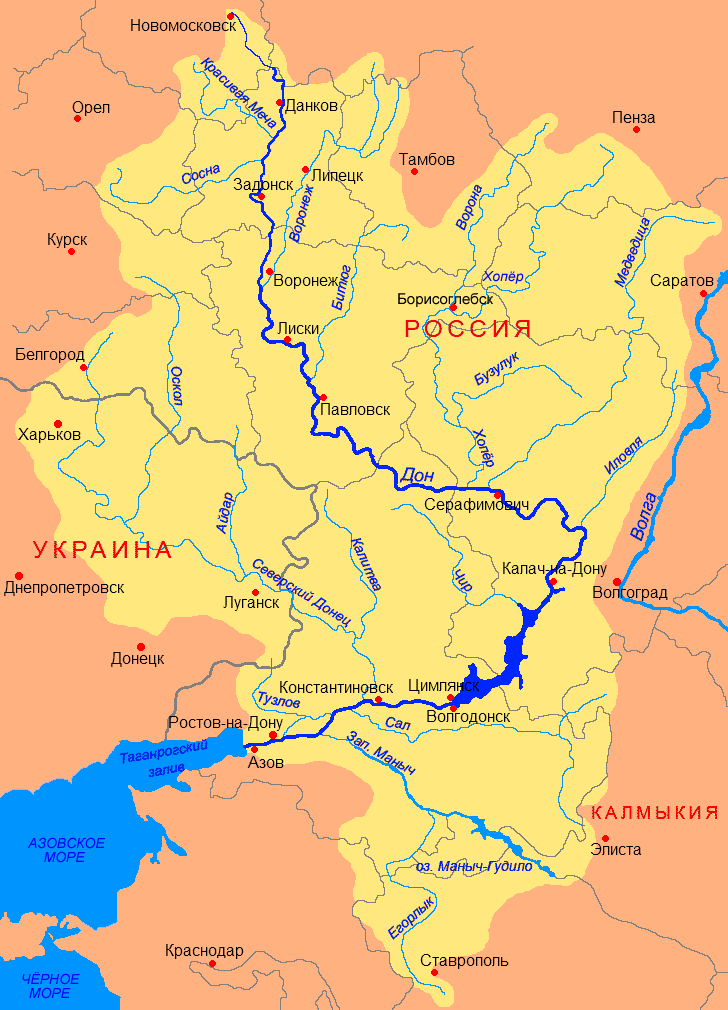
- Manych River flowing northwest at the bottom of this map. The upstream broadening is lake Manych-Gudilo.

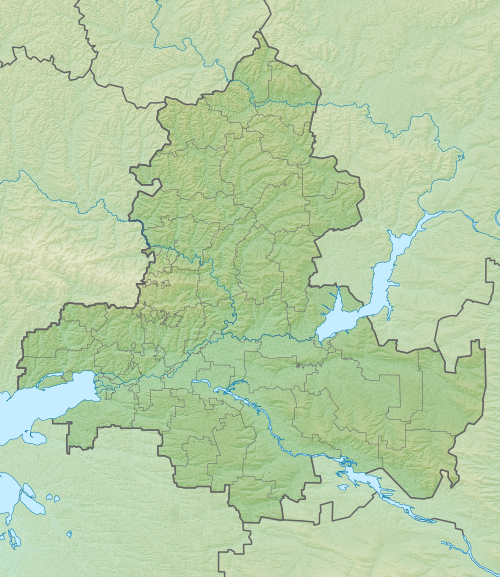
- Location within Rostov Oblast Location within European Russia

Physical characteristics
- Mouth: Don
  - coordinates: 47.2722°N 40.1193°E
- Length: 420 km (260 mi)
- Basin size: 35,400 km^{2} (13,700 sq mi)

Basin features
- Progression: Don→ Sea of Azov
- Tributaries
  - left: Kalaus, Yegorlyk

The Manych (Russian: Маныч) is a river in the Black Sea–Caspian Steppe of Southern Russia. It flows through the western and central part of the Kuma–Manych Depression. In ancient times, it was known as the Lik.

A tributary of the Don, it is 420 kilometers (260 mi) long, with its current source at the mouth of the Kalaus in the southwestern part of the Republic of Kalmykia. It flows through the town of Proletarsk and joins the Don in Manychskaya, east of the city of Rostov-on-Don.

Along the Manych, going downstream, there are:

- Dam at 45.70°N 44.10°E at the mouth of the Kalaus River blocking flow eastward to East Manych
- Lysyy Liman Reservoir (Dam at 45.87°N 44.20°E) in between these two dams
- A section that is almost dry
- Lake Manych-Gudilo
- Proletarsk (Proletarskoye) Reservoir (Пролетарское водохранилище) (Dam at 46°37′53″N 41°39′36″E, near the town of Proletarsk)
- Vesyolovskoye Reservoir (Весёловское водохранилище) (Dam at 47°06′36″N 40°46′37″E, near Vesyoly).
- Ust-Manych Reservoir near the river mouth (Усть-Манычское водохранилище) (Dam at 47°14′20″N 40°15′53″E)

The Proletarsk Dam is sufficiently high to raise the water level in Lake Manych-Gudilo upstream from it, so in fact the lake has become part of the Proletarsk Reservoir. The three reservoirs (and Lake Manych-Gudilo) form an almost continuous chain, the original course of the river being almost entirely flooded by them. According to the calculations of the Russian geographer Alexander Bazelyuk, between Manych-Gudilo and the river mouth, merely 9.1 km (5.7 mi) of the length of the West Manych river remains in its original "river" (rather than reservoir) form: 8.2 km (5.1 mi) from the Vesyolovsk Dam to the upper reaches of the Ust-Manych Reservoir, and 0.9 km (0.56 mi) from the Ust-Manych Dam to where the river joins the Don.

== Unusual drainage system ==
Formerly, at least in periods of high water, the Manych River would flow in two directions. The river Kalaus, when reaching the Kuma–Manych Depression at 45°43′N 44°06′E, would split. About 30% of the water would become the West Manych and flow northwest to, or toward, the Don River. The remaining water became the East Manych and flowed roughly southeast and dried up on the steppe before reaching the Caspian Sea. Sometime around 1970 a low dam was built which prevented any water from flowing into the East Manych. The East Manych is now fed by irrigation canals coming from the Kuma and Terek Rivers.

== Canals ==
Historically (prior to the construction of the dams and irrigation channels, i.e. until 1932–1940 for the West Manych, and until 1969 for the East Manych), both rivers were intermittent. During dry years, and even during the drier parts of normal years, both Manych Rivers would consist merely of a chain of small lakes or ponds with brackish or salty water. The system usually would be fully filled with fresh water only during the spring freshet.

Since the mid-20th century both Manych Rivers receive significant amounts of fresh water via a network of irrigation canals. Since 1948–1953, the West Manych has been receiving water from the Kuban River (via the Nevinnomyssk Canal and the Yegorlyk, a left tributary of the West Manych) and from the Tsimlyansk Reservoir on the Don (via the Don Canal). Since the late 1960s, the East Manych has been receiving water from the Terek River and the Kuma River via the Kuma–Manych Canal and Terek–Kuma Canal. According to A. Bazelyuk's calculations, the annual water flow in the West Manych (measured at the Vesyoly township) is 8.3 times as high as it was previous to the canal and dam constructions, while that in the East Manych (measured at the Chogray Dam) is 4.3 times as high as before.

If the plans for the proposed Eurasia Canal, linking the Caspian Sea with the Black Sea, are ever implemented, it will likely follow the Manych valley in its central and western section.
