= Terek–Kuma Canal =

Canal in southern Russia

- Location: Stavropol Krai, Russia

Specifications
- Length: 150 km (93 miles)

Geography
- Start point: Terek River
- End point: Kuma River
- Beginning coordinates: 43°42′33″N 44°31′03″E
- Ending coordinates: 44°48′09″N 44°39′38″E

Terek–Kuma Canal (Russian: Терско-Кумский канал is a canal in southern Russia, and connects between the Terek River and Kuma River. It has a total length of 150 kilometres (93 mi), and an irrigation area of about 100,000 hectares (250,000 acres).

== History ==
In December 1926, Soviet authorities approved the construction of a canal between the Terek River and Kuma River to improve the local irrigation system.

In October 1967, a government institution was set up to regulate the water supply systems near the Terek River, including for this canal.

In the future, this canal could become part of the water source for the Eurasia Canal, which is currently under planning.
