= Kuma–Manych Depression =

Geological depression in southwestern Russia

- Depression
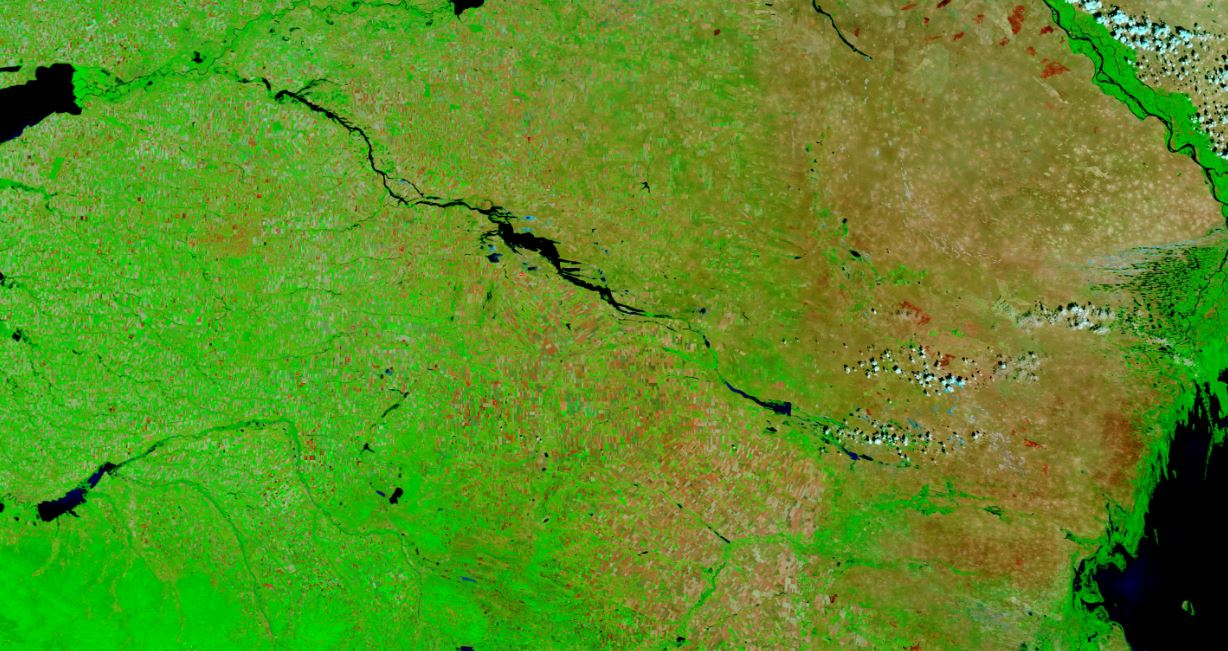
- Kuma-Manych Depression and Manych River from low Earth orbit. Upper left is the eastern tip of the Sea of Azov and lower right is the Caspian Sea. In the middle of the image is the Lake Manych-Gudilo. Upper right is the Volga and lower left is the Kuban River.

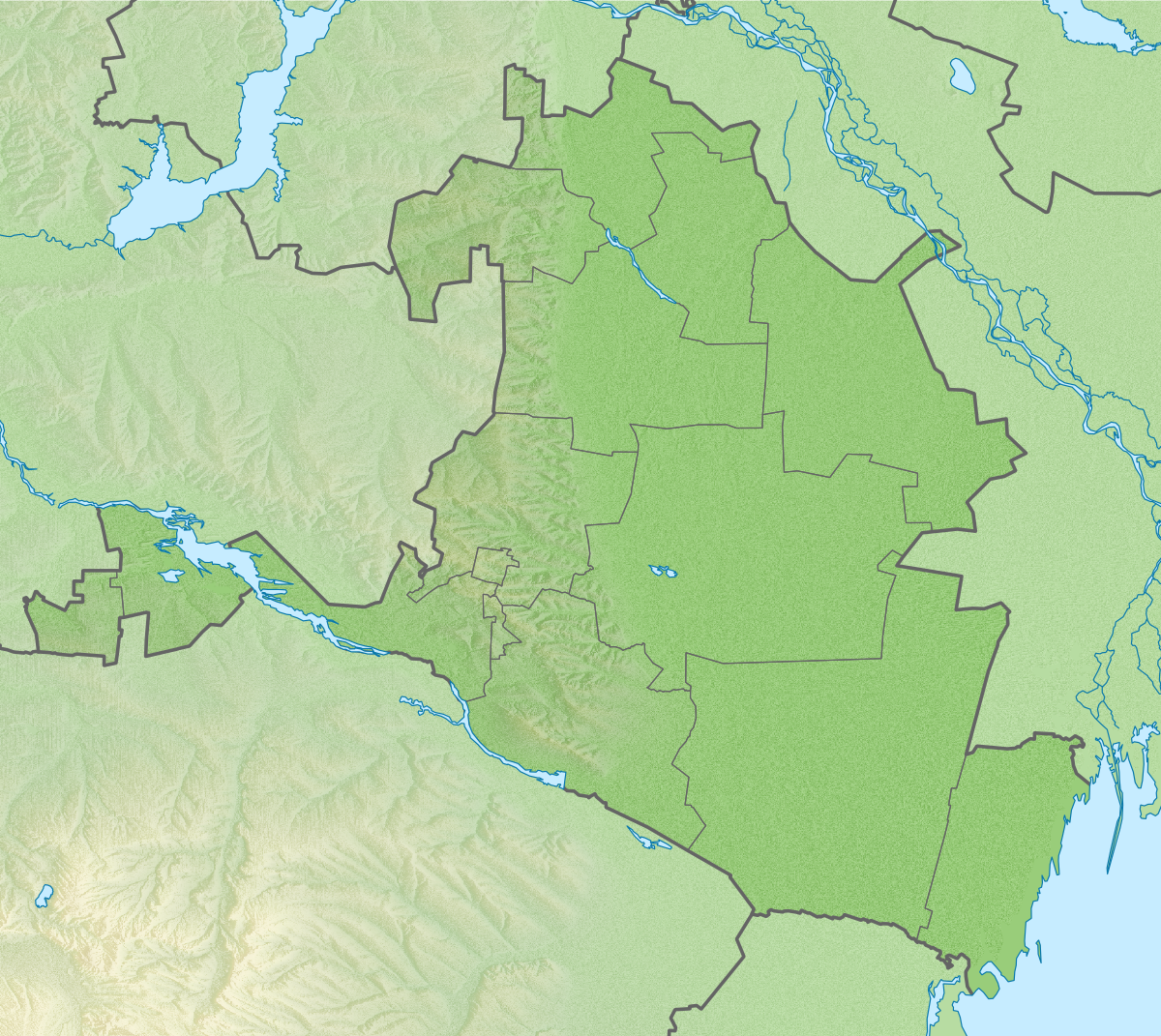
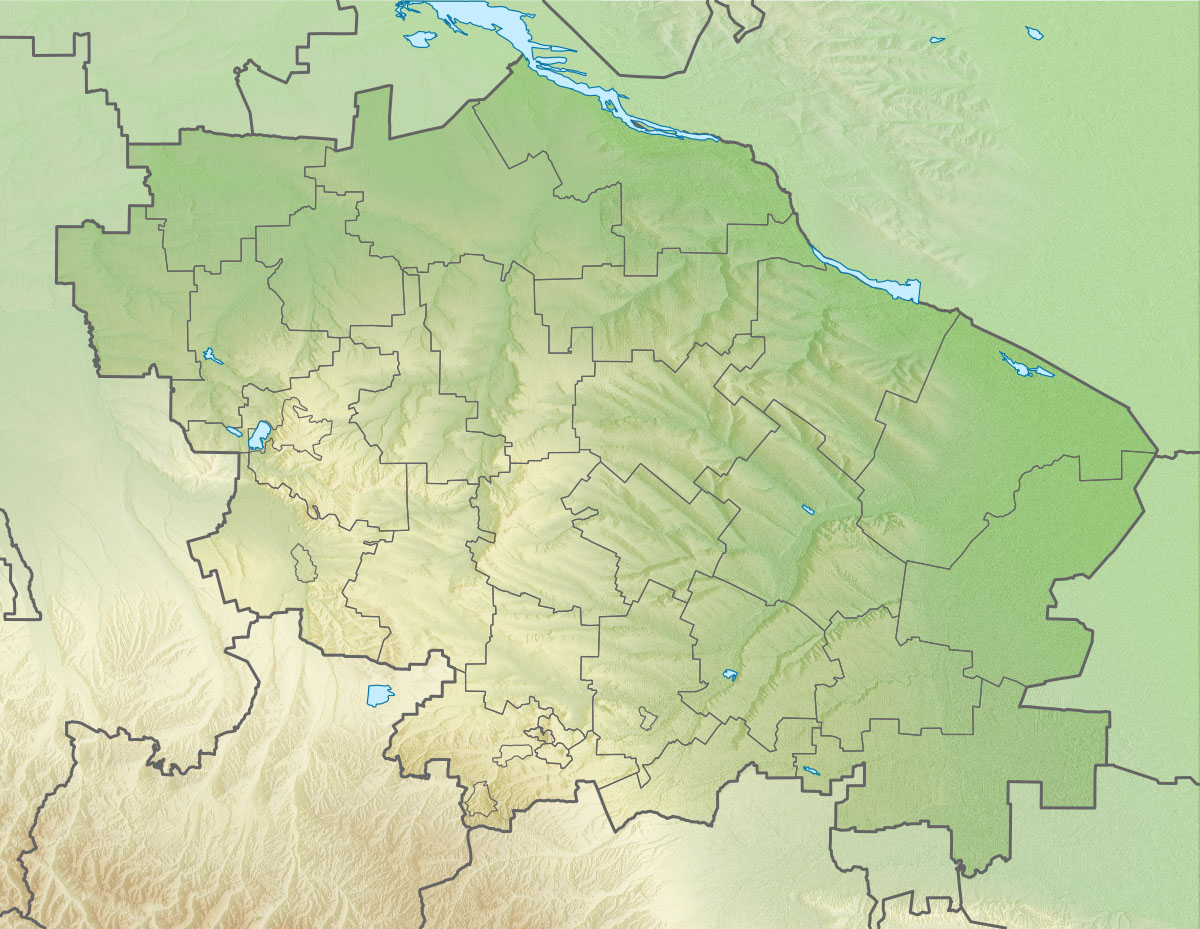
- Location within Kalmykia Location within Stavropol Krai Location within European Russia
- Coordinates: 45°42′54″N 44°06′18″E

The Kuma–Manych depression (Russian: Кумо–Манычская впадина, romanized: Kumo–Manychskaya vpadina) is a geological depression in southwestern Russia that separates the Russian Plain to the north from Ciscaucasia to the south. It is named after the Kuma and Manych rivers.

== Geography ==
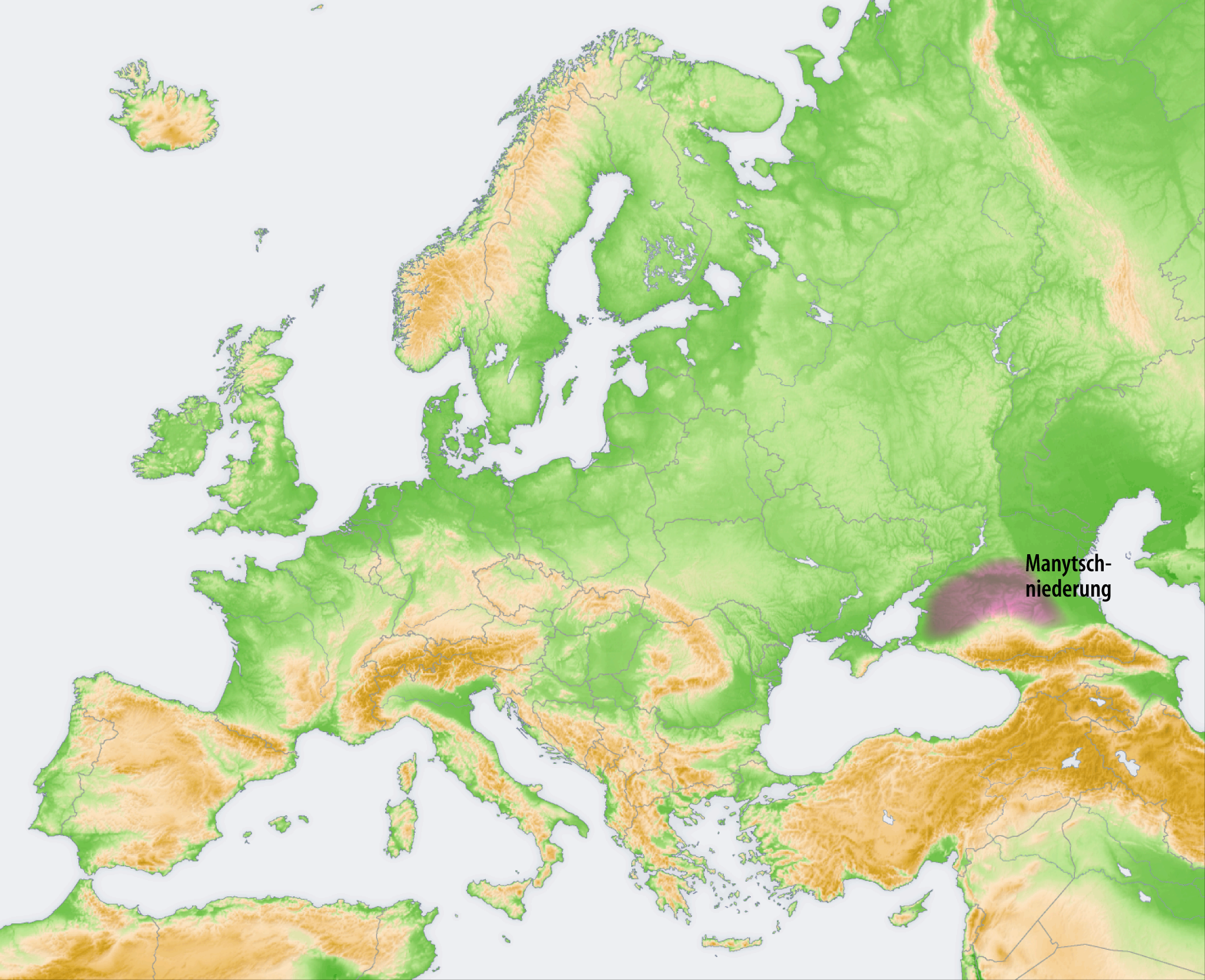
Kuma–Manych Depression (in violet)

Kuma–Manych depression is sometimes regarded as a definition for the natural boundary between Asia and Europe.

The Rostov Nature Reserve is located within the depression.

== See also ==
- Eurasia Canal
- Manych Ship Canal
- Terek–Kuma Lowland
