= Vodny Island =

Island in Rostov Oblast, Russia

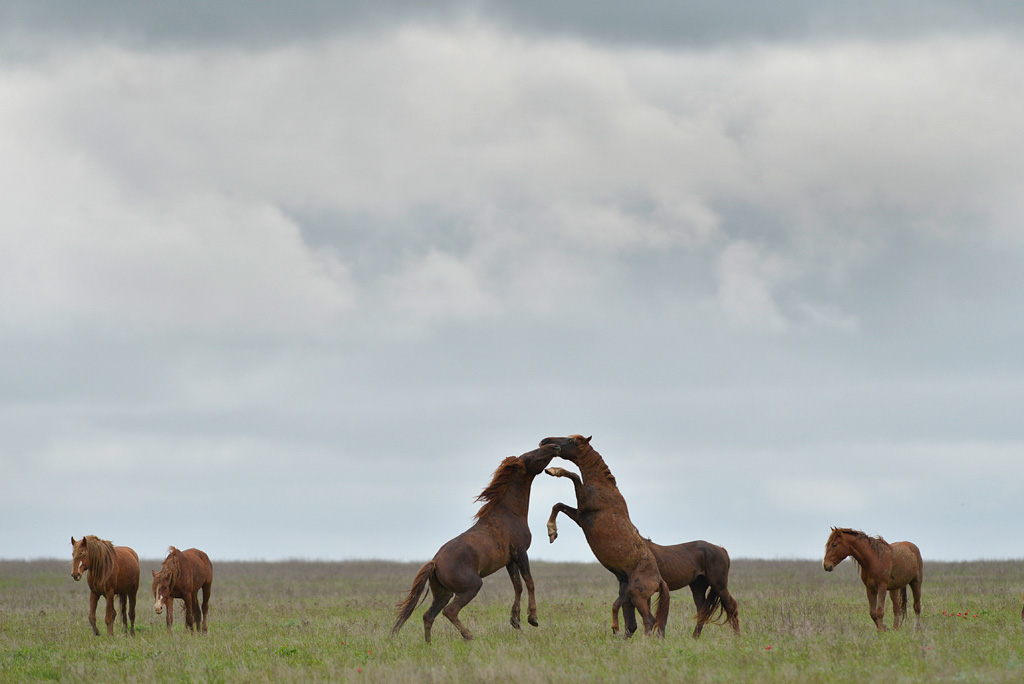
- Wild horses on Vodny Island
- Interactive map of Vodny Island

Geography
- Location: Orlovsky District of Rostov Oblast, Manych-Gudilo Lake
- Coordinates: 46°17′01″N 42°18′03″E

Administration
- Russia

The Vodny Island (Watery in English; Russian: Водный) is the uninhabited island situated in the northern part of the Manych-Gudilo Lake, Orlovsky District, Rostov Oblast, Russia.

== Description ==
The island has the form of a crescent. It is 12 kilometres (7.5 mi) long and 4 kilometres (2.5 mi) wide. On the island there is only a small brick building and a sandy well. There is no bushy and woody vegetation there, only the short thyme, wormwood and fescue. Horse skulls and bones are scattered all over the area.

The Vodny Island was formed only in 1948. In 1936, the government launched the construction of the "River of happiness" - similarly, in the propaganda materials that called upon the citizens to join the people's construction, was called the Nevinnomyssk Canal, through which the Kuban and Egorlyk rivers were supposed to be connected. In 12 years the project was implemented, and the water flowed into the neighboring areas, flooding large fields. On the surface there were left only a couple of islands, with Vodny being the largest of them. It has also been presumed that the island was formed in 1954, when water was discharged from the neighboring Proletarian Reservoir, with the aim of softening the arid climate of those places.

There is an urban legend that the horses appeared on the island during the time of Batu Khan, who supposedly put the loot in the valley of the Western Manych River, and buried the most valuable treasure on the island and put the horses on guard. According to another version, these horses are the descendants of the animals abandoned by the Red Army, which mostly used the Don breed because of their strength. However, both these stories are fiction.

According to an eyewitness, the water came so unexpectedly that separated from the main herd a couple of hundred sheep and a dozen horses. Initially, the shepherds tried to take the sheep by boat but later decided to return for the remaining livestock, when the water would be covered with ice. But unlike the sheep, the horses became too wild.

In the 1950s, the state farm decided to use the island as a pasture. Five thousand sheep and a couple dozen horses were on the island from spring to autumn, wolves could not get them, and there was no need to pay for food. For transportation of cattle, a ferry crossing was organized, which sent animals twice daily. However, a problem arose later: due to intervention in the hydrological regime, the salinity of the water began to increase rapidly. According to local reports, by the mid-1950s, it had lost its drinking qualities. As a result, the state farm dug a self-pouring artesian well for watering the cattle.

Cattle grazing on Vodny Island was stopped in the late 1980s. From that time on there were only horses. Wells with fresh water eventually became clogged, the ferry stopped working. Then the local authorities decided to organize on the basis of the old sanatorium a building for a new one, for this purpose they tried to remove the horses from the island. However, the horses were too wild and could not be moved. As a result, the project was abandoned.
