= Rhinella acrolopha =

Conservation status
- Endangered (IUCN 3.1)

Scientific classification
- Kingdom: Animalia
- Phylum: Chordata
- Class: Amphibia
- Order: Anura
- Family: Bufonidae
- Genus: Rhinella
- Species: R. acrolopha

Binomial name
- Rhinella acrolopha (Linda Trueb, 1971)
- Rhinella acrolopha is known from the vicinity of Cerro Malí in the Serranía del Darién of eastern Panama and adjacent Colombia

Synonyms
- Rhamphophryne acrolopha Trueb, 1971

Species of amphibian

Rhinella acrolopha, also known as Cerro Mali beaked toad, is a species of toad in the family Bufonidae. It is found in the Serranía del Darién in eastern Panama (including the Darién National Park) and in the immediately adjacent northwestern Colombia, in the Los Katíos National Park. The specific name acrolopha is derived from the Greek akrolophos, meaning crest of a mountain or ridge, and refers to the isolated occurrence of this species at high elevations in the Serranía del Darién. However, the International Union for Conservation of Nature (IUCN) characterizes it as a lowland species.

== Description ==
Males can grow to 38 mm (1.5 in) and adult to 45 mm (1.8 in) in snout–vent length. The snout is acuminate in dorsal aspect and long, directed anteroventrally, and terminally truncate in lateral aspect. Tympanum is absent. The supraorbital, postorbital, and supratympanic crests are present, while the pretympanic crest is variable in occurrence and the occipital crest is present but indistinct. The fingers have rudiments of webbing. The toes are partially webbed. Dorsal coloration varies from yellowish tan to reddish and dark brown. Some individuals have a partial or complete vertebral stripe. The iris is bronze with black reticulations.

== Habitat and conservation ==
Rhinella acrolopha occurs in humid lowland and lower montane forests to elevations of about 1,400 m (4,600 ft) above sea level, although the original species description indicated its altitudinal range as 1,265–1,481 m (4,150–4,859 ft). It is a terrestrial species. The known populations are within protected areas, outside of which it would probably be threatened by habitat loss caused by agricultural development, cultivation of illegal crops (pollution from spraying them), logging, and human settlement.
