= Manych Ship Canal =

Partly completed canal between the Black and the Caspian Sea

The Manych Ship Canal is a canal between the Black Sea lagoon the Sea of Azov and the Caspian Sea.

As of 2008, proposals were being considered to turn it into a larger canal known as the Eurasia Canal. If built, this would be a multipurpose water-resources system and a limb of international transport. A proposed design would deepen the canal to 6.5 m (21 ft) and widen it to 80 m (260 ft). This would afford a traffic capacity of more than 75 million tons of cargo per year, and vessels could have a freight-carrying capacity of up to 10,000 tons.

== Projections for development ==
Projections for development of the freight turnover in southern Russia prepared by the Central Research Institute of Economy and Water Transport Exploitation show a steady growth trend of foreign trade freight traffic, including water transport. The Volga–Don Canal, constructed in the 1950s, is approaching its traffic capacity limit of 14.8 million tons. The Eurasia concept is one of a few extra or expanded canals being considered between the basins of Azov–Black and Caspian Seas to improve ease and speed of commerce.

The 700 km (430 mi)-long Manych Ship Canal includes the existing Manych Waterway through Lake Manych-Gudilo and the Veselovskoe and Proletarskoe reservoirs and could be extended to the Caspian Sea via the sparsely populated steppes of Kalmykia. The watershed divide between the Azov and Caspian seas has a western slope elevation of 27 m (89 ft) and an eastern slope elevation of 54 m (177 ft). The Gidroexpertiza expert center of hydraulic facilities safety estimates this divide can be surmounted by construction of three or four shipping locks of low pressure on the western slope, and three average pressure or six low pressure shipping locks on the eastern slope. Construction of six low pressure shipping locks on the eastern slope of the watershed could greatly reduce the mass of excavation and lower its daily fresh water requirements by a third, to approximately 1.5 cubic km.

Three main methods can be found to water the Eurasia canal:

- Complete the Volga-Chograi Canal as a pipeline to reduce evaporation and seepage losses;
- Use wind-generated electricity to pump fresh water up along the eastern cascade of the main canal from the mouth of the Volga River; or
- Impound and transfer through existing canals peak flows from the upper reaches of the Kuban and Terek rivers to reduce frequent flooding along these rivers.

== History ==
=== 20th century ===
The West Manych River originally consisted of 15 small lakes connected by narrow streams. Manych spring flooding quickly evaporated because the geological structure of the Manych depression resembles a plain of "plates" and hollows with depths typically not more than 2 m (6 ft 7 in). The river course became flat cracked saline land though the summer, with some areas sparkling with the whiteness of salt.

A canal connecting the Black and Caspian Seas was approved in May 1932, and construction began that year in the West Manych River valley. The shipping route was divided into three sections by the construction plan of 1936. The first section from the Don River to Chograi Dam, with a length of 448 km (278 mi), was planned as a number of reservoir storage reaches. The second section was projected as a canal with a depth of 3 m, width of 67 m, and length of 73 km from Chograi Dam to the Kuma River. The third section, with a length of 150 km, was intended as a free-flow navigable and irrigational canal to a port on the Caspian coast.

The 62 km-long Ust-Manych reservoir, the 100 km-long Veselovskoe reservoir, and the 150 km-long Proletarskoe reservoir were formed in 1941 by the 4,7 km-long earthen Poiree dam near Veseliy hamlet and weir near stanitsa Proletarskaya. A 329 km-long locked waterway was created by the connection of Manych-Gudilo lake to Proletarskoe reservoir. The 48,8 km-long Chogray Reservoir was constructed from 1969 to 1973 on the East Manych River.

Construction of the Manych Ship Canal was suspended through the Second World War. Hydraulic works of the suspended shipping canal were reconstructed after the war, but construction of a connection with the Volga-Don Shipping Canal was cancelled because of the lack of freight flow at that time.

Economic use of the Manych steppes improved through the second half of the 20th century. The Nevinnomyssky canal was completed in 1948, and water from the Kuban River began to flow to reservoirs of Manych. The water level of Proletarskoe reservoir reached the altitude mark of -11,9 m and Manych-Gudilo lake became full-flowing by the summer of 1954. Salinity of the water system rapidly decreased and lakes became filled, with many of them forming one connected system. Water supply canals and filling the Manych with water created new wading bird habitats. Biodiversity of fish fauna was considerably increased over the first 15 or 20 years following construction of the tandem reservoir system, and some species gained importance as a fishery. Increasing salinity decreased fish yields in Proletarskoe reservoir, and fishing is possible only in mouths of rivers entering reservoirs. Biodiversity of fish fauna and its productivity might be improved by construction of the canal to supply Mancy-Gudilo Lake with fresh water to reduce salinity.

=== 21st century ===
The Volga-Don Shipping Canal no longer meets the present needs of carriers of countries of the Caspian region, and the completion of construction of the Manych Ship Canal would favour further growth of cargo traffic between the Caspian and Azov-Black Sea basins. Economic development of southern Russia requires completion of the canal. Construction of additional processing capacity for oil and gas fields on the Russian Caspian territory would produce 15 million tons of cargo per year by 2020. Processed oil products would reach 25 million tons annually if Kazakhstan, Azerbaijan and Turkmenistan processing capacities expand as planned. That amount could be carried to Western Europe by waterways rather than by railway. Oil from the Caspian shelf oilfield could be directly transported by tankers to processing capacities of Lukoil and KazMunayGas on the Black Sea shore without trans-shipments.

Modernization of the existing Volga-Don navigation canal can meet only the requirements of Russian companies. In the absence of improved Russian transportation routes by 2020, alternative transport corridors may be constructed through Azerbaijan to the Georgian seaports in the Black Sea or through Iran to the Persian Gulf.

The Manych Ship Canal could be a Russian route satisfying all requirements of the economically developing Caspian countries. Russia may be unable to provide competitive cargo tariffs without the Manych Ship Canal and may lose a considerable part of profits from the transit of cargo of expanding economies in the Caspian region. Construction of the Canal can become a key factor of formation of industrial clusters adjacent to the shipping route within the republics of Kalmykia and Dagestan, the territories of Stavropol and Krasnodar Krai, and the Rostov and Astrakhan regions of southern Russia. Construction of the Manych Ship Canal would link the Caspian and Azov Seas and provide an outlet to world oceans for southern Russia, Kazakhstan, Turkmenistan, Azerbaijan and northern Iran. The canal would be an important factor for the development of the whole Southern Federal District.

== Benefits ==
Fresh water from the canal could increase yields of agriculture and husbandry in arid areas. Hydroelectric-pumped storage power plants could be constructed at the base of facilities of the canal. Such power plants could significantly increase operating benefits of wind-driven power plants planned to be constructed in the Republic of Kalmykia and the Stavropol Territory. Canal facilities could include water reservoirs up-slope of the canal for a pumped-storage hydroelectricity power generation scheme in times of peak level usage or zero-wind conditions.

Sixty MW of electric power will be required to provide a water supply for each lock. Power can be provided by construction of 30 wind-electric sets with an output of three MW each. This would require 10 sets near each lock on the eastern slope of the Canal. Energy may be recovered while filling and draining the locks. Construction of the Manych Ship Canal can become a comprehensive approach to the development of arid areas possibly minimizing negative environmental consequences of earlier projects in the Manych-Chograi ecosystem.

The project would shorten delivery time and reduce transport expenses to improve the competitive position of the Russian transportation network. Construction and maintenance of the canal would promote further development of the regional productive forces by establishing new enterprises and workplaces to reduce social tension and increase tax revenues in regions with a high unemployment rate.

=== Positive consequences ===
Positive consequences of implementation of the project would include:

- Creation of prerequisites for social, economic, agricultural, and industrial development, as well as development of nature conservation and the fish processing industry in the adjacent regions of Kalmykia, Dagestan, Stavropol krai and Rostov oblast;
- Improvement of water supply in the arid zone. A quarter of the population of the Republic of Kalmykia coastal zone suffer from kidney problems attributed to saline groundwater and transfer of salt by wind from the area adjacent to Manych Lake. After the construction of the Manych Ship Canal, it would be possible to supply Manych-Gudilo Lake with fresh water to reduce water salinity.
- Investigations of the local ecosystems may increase assessments for nature conservation;
- Job growth, creation of workplaces, cessation of the outflow of able-bodied population, and influx of qualified specialists from other regions and cities; and
- Widening of the existing social infrastructure of dwelling houses, kindergartens, educational institutions, and hospitals to improve citizens' health and optimize demographic and environmental conditions in the region.

Completion of construction of Manych Ship Canal would lead to emergence of manufacturing activities, a significant decrease of unemployment rate, normalization of migration, an increase of incomes, and improvement of the general well-being of the population.

Fresh water from the canal would potentially increase productivity of agriculture and husbandry. Desalinization of strongly saline water bodies along the canal route may significantly improve qualitative composition and yields of fishery.

=== Employment benefits ===
A lack of employment leads to the drift of the population away from the region, while a narrow range of choice of needed professions, as a rule, limited to agriculture and husbandry, brings highly skilled specialists, among them graduates of the best colleges or universities of Russia, to look for a job away from home. The present rates of birth and natality of Southern Russia, the highest in the Russian Federation, may suggest future aggravation of the problem of employment if the present situation does not change.

Completion of construction of the canal would lead to the emergence of a considerable quantity of new jobs in production, formed by the influence of operation of the canal (oil processing and refining, chemical industry, and other export-oriented productions) and in the process of construction and operation of the navigational route directly. Creation of new jobs in the productive industry may lead to an increase in the number of employees in the service industries.

A ship canal allows shipment of a wider variety of cargo than pipeline systems limited to products of the hydrocarbon process industry. The ship canal would become an important factor in the development of the manufacturing industry of the republics of Kalmykia and Dagestan, Stavropol and Krasnodarskiy Territories, Rostov, and Astrakhan Regions. Oil and gas processing, chemical industry and other export-oriented productions could receive a high-power development impulse.

A decrease in the unemployment rate would be one important result of construction of the Manych Ship Canal. The Southern Federal District is the most problematic region of Russia with regard to the employment rate, one of the causes of a growth in social tensions.

== Environmental concerns ==
Transporting oil and oil products by tankers with a capacity of 5,000 tons along the Manych Ship Canal and Volga-Don Waterway could lead to potentially large petroleum spills. Such spills would be difficult to localize and could negatively influence the unique natural features of the Volga-Akhtuba inter-river area if transported by strong currents along the navigation channel into numerous shoals and ducts. A shipwreck of a tanker spilling 5,000 tons of oil near Volgograd could damage the whole lower part of the Volga, including protected areas and nature reserves. The same might happen to the lower part of the Don. Such a shipwreck on the Manych Ship Canal might restrict the extent pollution between shipping locks. Locks could control flow velocity to reduce the speed of spreading oil and contain an oil spill for removal and cleanup.

The water level of the Caspian Sea has varied within 4 m over a period of 30 years. Water levels in the Caspian Sea down to true altitude of -29 m reduce the depth of the lower Volga and restrict ship movement in this part of the Volga-Don Waterway. A shipping lock in the Manych Ship Canal near the Caspian Sea could be designed to control this water level fluctuation.

Construction of a canal in the arid zone should be preceded by fundamental studies of prospective consequences of the designed engineering and construction works for the environment. Implementation of the project is connected with considerable earth excavation when laying the canal track.

The actual environmental impact statement can be presented on design stage only. Minimization of the negative ecological impact can be provided only if separate design companies and experts coordinate their technical decisions. Some scientists also make assumptions that the salt waters of the Azov Sea can fall into the canal.

According to the project concept, the watershed point is in the Chograi reservoir. Fresh waters along the western slope (27 m) go down to the Don and along the eastern slope (54 m) to the Caspian Sea. The entire canal track would be filled with fresh water.

The engineering and construction measures and implementation of the project in general could extenuate the existing negative processes in the Manych-Chograi ecosystem. To foresee all the aspects of environmental safety in the arid zone of the South of Russia, basic research on prognostics and modeling of climatic volatility is required.

This assessment is preliminary and must become more concrete after conducting proper comprehensive ecological and engineer research of the area through which the canal track will be laid, after the planned engineering solution and the operating regime of the Canal.

== Feasibility studies ==
Scientific and technical feasibility studies of new water and land routes are relevant for densely populated southern Russia. Construction proposals for a navigation canal should be thoroughly studied to minimize environmentally negative consequences.

Risk factors include:

- an increase in salinity of soil and groundwater as a result of under flooding;
- the introduction of invasive flora and fauna which are foreign to the region;
- oil spill pollution of the water basin and littoral (coastal) ecosystems.

Constructing the canal invert and banks with concrete or similar materials could diminish shoreline erosion and decrease under flooding and soil salinization from percolating water losses.

There would be no direct waterway between the Azov and Caspian seas, for the watershed divide is on the level of the Chograi reservoir. Technical procedures for control and sterilization of ballast water will diminish the danger of transfer of foreign fauna over the watershed divide.

The over-mineralized endorheic basins of the Kuma-Manych depression created soil salinization and the appearance of unusable agricultural areas. An inflow of water with less mineralization may partially flush salinity from soils at higher elevations.

Strict observance of existing regulations for tanker oil transportation will be required. Waterworks installations should be designed to facilitate localization of oil patches and other types of surface pollution and removal of its consequences. Five hundred of the designed 700 km canal track passes through existing reservoirs requiring deepening of the canal invert.

Minimization of the environmentally negative impact can be provided only if separate design companies and environment experts coordinate their technical decisions and strictly observe the technical regulations and norms. Implementation of the project on construction of the navigation canal "Eurasia" is feasible and should not have environmentally negative consequences.

== Literature ==
Болаев А.В. "Предварительная оценка влияния завершения строительства Манычского судоходного канала (канала "Евразия") на социально-экономическое развитие Юга России" - Вестник Института комплексных исследований аридных территорий, 2008 №2 (Arasha Bolaev "Preliminary estimation of influence of completion of construction of the Manych Ship Canal (the Eurasia Canal) on the socio-economic development of the South of Russia", Herald of the Institute of Complex Research of Arid Territories, 2008 №2)
