= Nogaysky District =

Location of the Republic of Dagestan in Russia

Location of the Karachay-Cherkess Republic in Russia

Nogaysky District is the name of several administrative and municipal districts in Russia:

- Nogaysky District, Republic of Dagestan, an administrative and municipal district of the Republic of Dagestan
- Nogaysky District, Karachay–Cherkess Republic, an administrative and municipal district of the Karachay-Cherkess Republic

== See also ==
- Nogai (disambiguation)
