= West Asian peninsula =

West Asian peninsula may refer to:

- Anatolia, a peninsula in Turkey
- Arabian Peninsula, a peninsula in West Asia spanning several countries
- Sinai Peninsula, a peninsula in Egypt
- Europe, in reference to its boundary with Asia
