= Boundaries between the continents =

Geographical convention

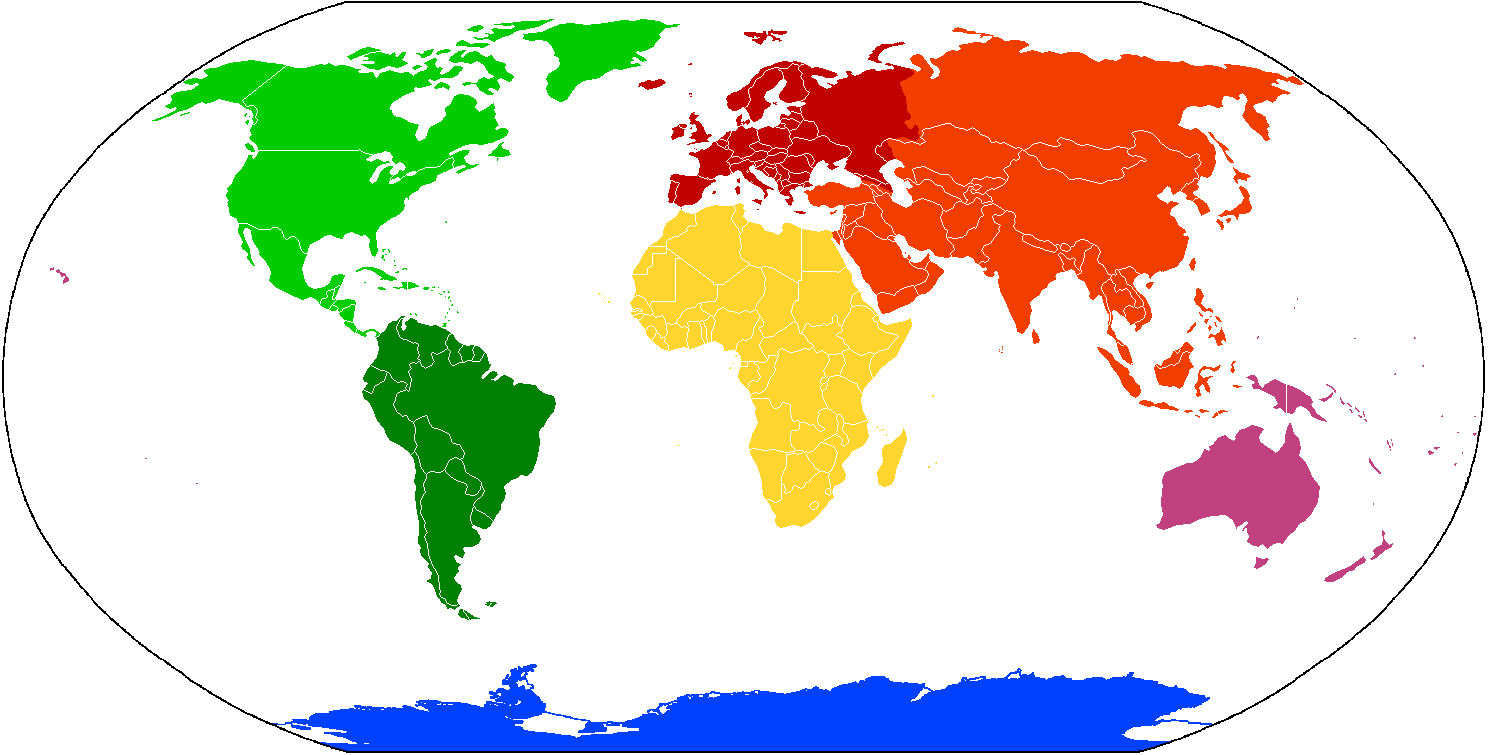
Color-coded map of continents: Americas North America South America Afro-Eurasia Africa Eurasia Europe Asia Oceania Antarctica

Map of island countries: These states are not located on any continent-sized landmass, but they are usually grouped geographically with a neighbouring continent.

Determining the boundaries between the continents is generally a matter of geographical convention and consensus.

Several slightly different conventions are in use. The number of continents is most commonly considered seven (in English-speaking countries) but may range as low as four when Afro-Eurasia and the Americas are both considered as single continents.

An island can be considered to be associated with a given continent by either lying on the continent's adjacent continental shelf (e.g. Singapore, the British Isles) or being a part of a microcontinent on the same principal tectonic plate (e.g. Madagascar and Seychelles). An island can also be entirely oceanic while still being associated with a continent by geology (e.g. Bermuda, the Australian Indian Ocean Territories) or by common geopolitical convention (e.g. Ascension Island, the South Sandwich Islands). Another example is the grouping into Oceania of the Pacific Islands with Australia and Zealandia.

There are three overland boundaries subject to definition:

- between Africa and Asia (dividing Afro-Eurasia into Africa and Eurasia): at the Isthmus of Suez;
- between Asia and Europe (dividing Eurasia): along the Turkish Straits, the Caucasus, and the Urals and the Ural River (historically also north of the Caucasus, along the Kuma–Manych Depression or along the Don River);
- between North America and South America (dividing the Americas): at some point on the Isthmus of Panama, with the most common demarcation in atlases and other sources following the Darién Mountains watershed along the Colombia–Panama border where the isthmus meets the South American continent (see Darién Gap).

While today the isthmus between Asia and Africa is navigable via the Suez Canal, and that between North and South America via the Panama Canal, these artificial channels are not generally accepted as continent-defining boundaries in themselves. The Suez Canal happens to traverse the Isthmus of Suez between the Mediterranean Sea and the Red Sea, dividing Africa and Asia. The continental boundaries are considered to be within the very narrow land connections joining the continents.

The remaining boundaries concern the association of islands and archipelagos with specific continents, notably:

- the delineation between Africa, Asia, and Europe in the Mediterranean Sea;
- the delineation between Asia and Europe in the Arctic Ocean;
- the delineation between Europe and North America in the North Atlantic Ocean;
- the delineation between North and South America in the Caribbean Sea;
- the delineation of Antarctica from Africa, Australia, and South America in the Indian, South Pacific, and South Atlantic oceans, respectively (referred to collectively by some geographers as the Southern Ocean or the Antarctic Ocean);
- the delineation of Asia from Australia in the Ceram Sea, Arafura Sea, Timor Sea, Halmahera Sea, and the Wallacean region of the Indonesian Archipelago
- the delineation of Asia from North America in the North Pacific Ocean.

== Africa and Asia ==
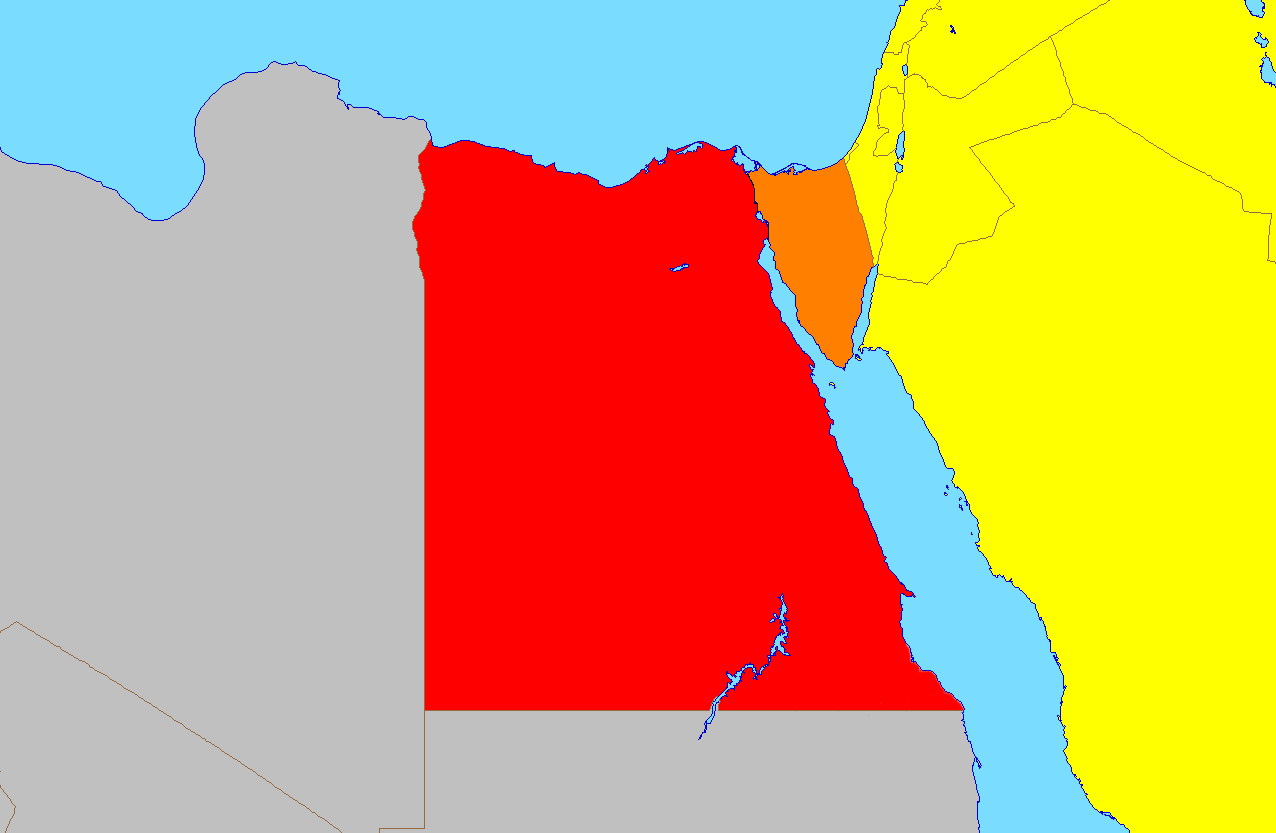
African part of Egypt Asian part of Egypt Rest of Africa Rest of Asia

Historically in Greco-Roman geography, "Africa" meant ancient Libya, and its eastern extent was taken to be around Marmarica, at the Catabathmus Magnus. This was not considered a continent. As wider knowledge of geography developed, the shape of the African landmass (and Egypt's "natural" inclusion in that landmass) became apparent. In 1806, William George Browne still titled his travelogue Travels in Africa, Egypt, and Syria. Similarly, James Bruce in 1835 published Travels through part of Africa, Syria, Egypt, and Arabia. On the other hand, as early as 1670 John Ogilby under the title Africa published "an accurate Description of the Regions of Egypt, Barbary, Libya, and Billedulgerid, the Land of Negroes, Guinea, Æthiopia, and the Abyssines, with all the adjacent Islands, either in the Mediterranean, Atlantic, Southern, or Oriental Seas, belonging thereunto".

The usual line taken to divide Africa from Asia today is at the Isthmus of Suez, the narrowest gap between the Mediterranean Sea and the Gulf of Suez, the route today followed by the Suez Canal. This makes the Sinai Peninsula geographically Asian, and Egypt a transcontinental country. Less than 2% of the Egyptian population live on the Sinai Peninsula, and hence Egypt, even though technically transcontinental, is usually considered an African country entirely and not partly Asian. But when discussing the geopolitical region of the Middle East and North Africa, Egypt is usually grouped with the Western Asian countries as part of the Middle East, while Egypt's western neighbor Libya is grouped with the remaining North African countries as the Maghreb. Both are members of the African Union. However, the geological boundary is located further to the east, along the Gulf of Aqaba and the Dead Sea Transform, with the Sinai Peninsula, Israel, Palestine, much of Lebanon, and the coastal governorates of Syria being located on the African Plate.

The Comoros, Madagascar, Mauritius, and Seychelles are island countries in the Indian Ocean which are nominally associated with Africa. The Socotra Archipelago may be considered African as it lies on its continental shelf; however, it is politically a part of Yemen, an Asian country.

== Africa and Europe ==
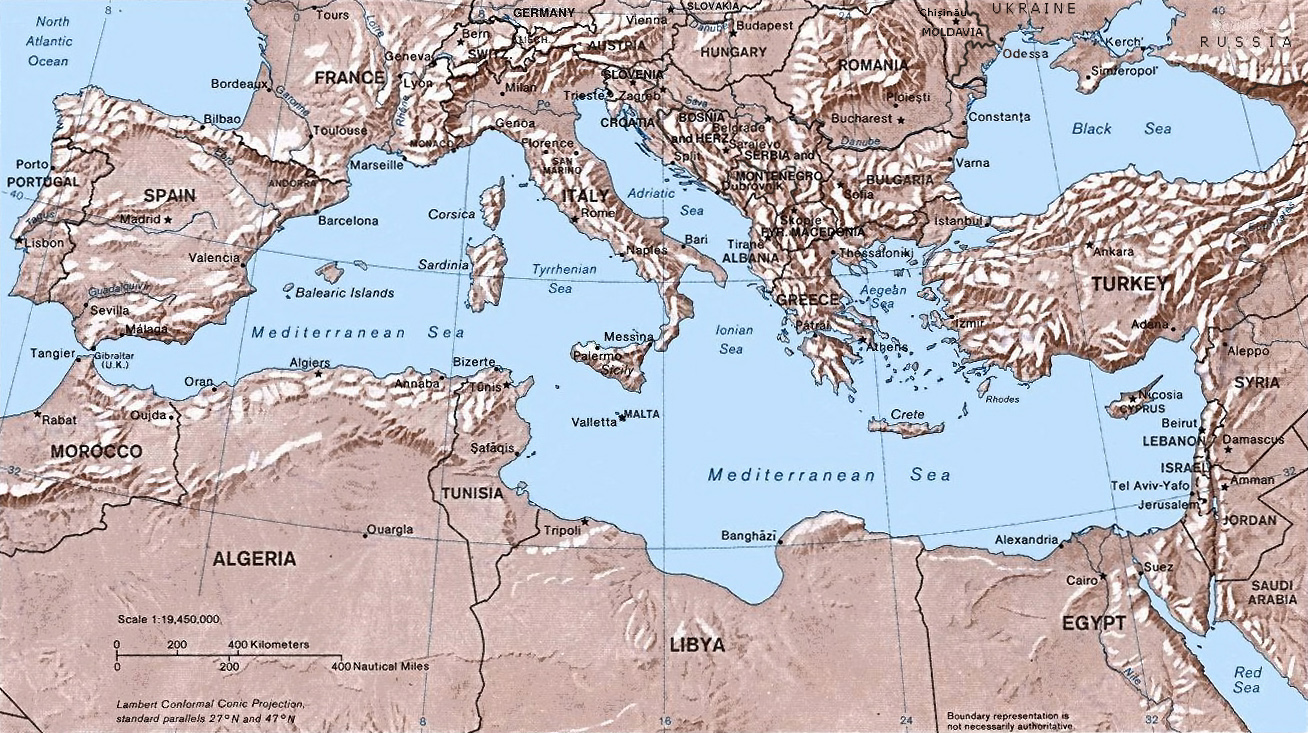
The Mediterranean Sea, between Africa and Europe

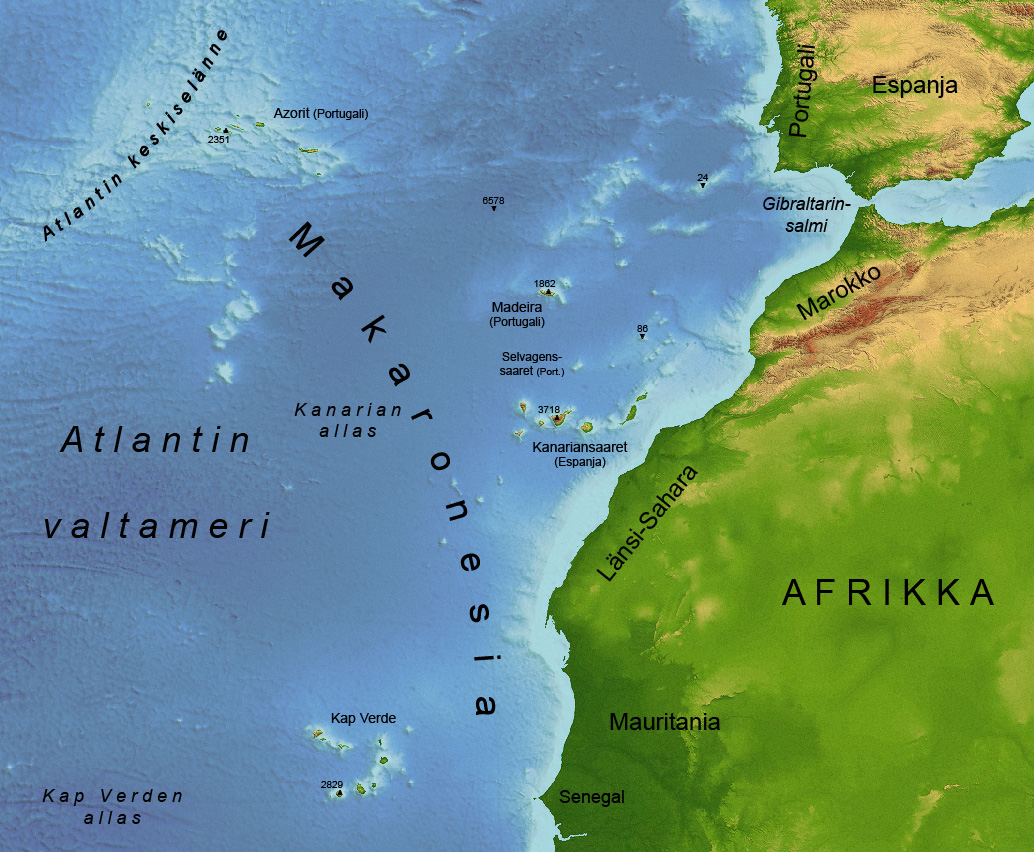
The Atlantic Ocean around the plate boundaries (text is in Finnish)

The African and European mainlands are non-contiguous, and the delineation between these continents is thus merely a question of which islands are to be associated with which continent.

The Portuguese Atlantic island possession of the Azores is 1,368 km (850 mi) from Europe and 1,507 km (936 mi) from Africa, and is sometimes grouped with Europe. By contrast, the Canary Islands and the Madeira islands (the latter of which also include the Desertas Islands and the Savage Islands) off the Atlantic coast of Morocco are much closer to, and usually grouped with, Africa; the Canary Islands are only 100 km (62 mi) from the African mainland at their closest point but 945 km (587 mi) from the European mainland, while Madeira is 520 km (320 mi) from the African mainland and 1,000 km (620 mi) from the European mainland. In his 1895 book Africa: Volume 2, author Augustus Henry Keane remarked, "In the North Atlantic there are four insular groups — Madeira, the Canaries, Cape Verde, and the Azores — which are usually assigned to Africa, although the Canaries and Cape Verde alone belong geographically to that continent, the Azores are lost, so to say, in mid-Atlantic."

The Mediterranean island country of Malta was considered a part of Africa for centuries. However, it is much closer to the coast of Sicily (a distance of about 81 km (50 mi)) than it is to the African mainland (roughly 288 km (179 mi) away). The nearby Italian island of Lampedusa (principal island of the Pelagian Islands) is 207 km (129 mi) from Sicily while just 127 km (79 mi) from the African mainland; similarly, Pantelleria is 100 km (62 mi) from Sicily and just 71 km (44 mi) from the African mainland. All of these Mediterranean islands, including Malta and Sicily, are actually located on the African Plate, and could be considered part of the African continent geologically. However, for political and cultural reasons, maps generally display them as part of Europe instead.

A single Spanish islet, known as Alboran Island, is also debatably located on either the African Plate or the Eurasian Plate. This island is located in the Alboran Sea, 55 km (34 mi) north of the Moroccan coast and 85 km (53 mi) south of Spain.

=== European-governed territories in Africa ===
There are six definitive occurrences of territories unequivocally being a part of the African continent, but legally being administered by a European state. Three of these are administered by France, and the other three by Spain. The existence of these territories further blurs the line between the borders of Africa and Europe, in particular with regard to the Spanish territories which lie immediately adjacent to and/or connected to the African mainland. The French territories lie within the Indian Ocean, and, consequently, are more dislocated from the principal boundary between the two continents.

The uninhabited Spanish unincorporated overseas minor territories, known as the plazas de soberanía ("Localities of Sovereignty"), are small islands that lie immediately adjacent to the North African coastline, with the exception of Peñón de Vélez de la Gomera, which was originally an island like the other 'localities' but has subsequently become directly connected to the Moroccan (African) mainland. The two other Spanish territories are the exclaves of Ceuta and Melilla, which are two populated coastal cities located directly on the African mainland, both bordering only Morocco.

Two of the French territories are the inhabited overseas departments and regions of Mayotte and Réunion. Mayotte is an island territory located west of the island country of Madagascar within the Mozambique Channel. Réunion is an island territory located near the island country of Mauritius and to the east of Madagascar (both nominally considered part of the African continent). The final territory is the Scattered Islands in the Indian Ocean, administratively a part of the French Southern and Antarctic Lands. This French territory consists of a range of minor uninhabited atolls in the Indian Ocean, located in the deep sea surrounding Madagascar.

== Antarctica ==
Antarctica along with its outlying islands have no permanent population. All land claims south of 60°S latitude are held in abeyance by the Antarctic Treaty System.

Australia's Heard Island and McDonald Islands (an external territory) and the French Kerguelen Islands are located on the Kerguelen Plateau, on the Antarctic continental plate. Both are still within the bounds of the Indian Ocean. The United Nations categorizes Heard Island and McDonald Islands, which are politically affiliated with Australia, as being part of Oceania. The islands are 4,000 km from Perth in Australia, and have never been inhabited by indigenous peoples of Oceania or any other humans. Heard Island has only been visited 240 times throughout its entire history, and the McDonald Islands have only ever been visited twice, in 1971 and 1980. The World Factbook categorizes these islands as part of Antarctica rather than Oceania.

The French Crozet Islands, Île Amsterdam, Île Saint-Paul, and the Norwegian Bouvet Island are also located on the Antarctic continental plate, and are not often associated with other continents. The United Nations categorize Bouvet Island as part of South America, while the World Factbook categorizes it as part of Antarctica.

South Georgia and the South Sandwich Islands are closer to Antarctica than to any other continent. However, they are politically associated with the Falkland Islands, which are less geographically isolated from South America. Furthermore, Argentina, a South American country, maintains its irredentist claims on all of these islands, which are administered by the United Kingdom. The United Nations consider them to be part of South America. Definitions of South America that exclude the Galápagos Islands and Juan Fernández Islands (both oceanic in nature) still generally include the Falklands, which share biographical affinities to Patagonia and Tierra del Fuego, and which are located on the South American continental shelf. The Falkland Islands and South Georgia and the South Sandwich Islands were uninhabited when discovered by Europeans, with some theorizing that the Falklands were visited by Indigenous peoples of the Americas during prehistoric times. These theories are usually considered dubious, as there is no archaeological evidence indicating prehistoric human inhabitation on the Falklands. South Georgia and the South Sandwich Islands do not have any permanent residents. The Falkland Islands have historically had a British population, with a culture distinct from that of mainland South America. There was a violent war between Argentina and the United Kingdom regarding ownership of the islands in 1982, and the residents of the Falklands do not currently wish to be associated with South America, despite their geographical proximity.

The Prince Edward Islands are located between Africa and Antarctica, and are the territory of South Africa, an African country.

Macquarie Island and the Antipodes Islands, Auckland Islands, and Campbell Islands are all uninhabited, and are located between Australia and New Zealand and Antarctica. The Antipodes Islands, Auckland Islands, and Campbell Islands are politically part of New Zealand, while Macquarie Island has been integrated into the Australian state of Tasmania. None are discrete political entities like Heard Island and McDonald Islands. As such, they are likely considered by the United Nations also to be part of Oceania. The Auckland Islands could be considered part of Oceania on cultural grounds rather than mere political grounds, as they are believed to be the southernmost island group to have been settled by Polynesians during prehistoric times. The islands were uninhabited when discovered by Europeans, but archaeological traces have since been found to indicate Polynesian settlement, dating to the 13th century, on Enderby Island. Macquarie Island is theorized to have possibly had contact with Polynesians, although there is no archaeological evidence to support this.

== Asia and Australia ==
The Wallace, Weber, and Lydekker Lines, the three principal biogeographic boundaries in Wallacea

The continental boundary between Asia and Australia is somewhere in the Wallacean region of the Malay Archipelago. The boundary is frequently divided along the anthropologic Melanesian Line or the biogeographic Weber's Line. Geologically, the Aru Islands in Maluku Province and western New Guinea, which contain six provinces of Indonesia, are part of the Australian continent. The eastern half of New Guinea is a part of Papua New Guinea which is considered part of Oceania. Indonesia is commonly referred to as one of the Southeast Asian countries. Indonesia's eastern region of Western New Guinea and nearby islands, makes it a transcontinental country; Western New Guinea is often considered part of Oceania because of its Indigenous Melanesian inhabitants and geological association with the Australian continental landmass. East Timor, an independent state that was formerly a part of Indonesia, is classified by the United Nations as a part of the South-eastern Asia subregion. It has joined the Association of Southeast Asian Nations, having been involved as an ASEAN Regional Forum member since independence, and has participated in the Southeast Asian Games since 2003.

Occasionally, all of the Malay Archipelago is included in Oceania, although this is extremely rare, especially as most of the archipelago lies on the Asian continental shelf. The Malay Archipelago was more frequently associated with Oceania during the 19th century, when the term was first coined. Many inhabitants in the Malay Archipelago are Austronesians, sharing genetic and linguistic affinities to the Melanesian, Micronesian, and Polynesian inhabitants of Oceania, who also fall under the Austronesian umbrella. However, the Austronesians of the Malay Archipelago had significant contact with mainland Asia during prehistoric times, unlike with the Austronesians and Indigenous Australians of Oceania, who were isolated from the culture of Asia and the Eastern world. Epeli Hauʻofa, a scholar of Tongan and Fijian descent, considered the Malay Archipelago separate from Oceania for this very reason. He wrote, "Before the advent of Europeans into the Pacific, our cultures were truly oceanic, in the sense that the sea barrier shielded us for millennia from the great cultural influences that raged through continental land masses and adjacent islands. This prolonged period of isolation allowed for the emergence of distinctive oceanic cultures with the only non-oceanic influences being the original cultures that the earliest settlers brought with them when they entered the vast, uninhabited region. Scholars of antiquity may raise the issue of continental cultural influences on the western and northwestern border islands of Oceania, but these are exceptions, and the Asian mainland influences were largely absent until the modern era. On the eastern extremity of the region there were some influences from the Americas, but these were minimal. It is for these reasons that Pacific Ocean islands from Japan, through the Philippines and Indonesia, which are adjacent to the Asian mainland, do not have oceanic cultures, and are therefore not part of Oceania. This definition of our region delineates us clearly from Asia and the pre-Columbian Americas and is based on our own historical developments, rather than on other people's perceptions of us."

The United Nations and The World Factbook categorize the Australian Indian Ocean external territories of Christmas Island and Cocos (Keeling) Islands (both geographically adjacent to Java) as being part of Oceania, rather than Asia. The islands lie within the bounds of the Australian Plate, and were uninhabited prior to European discovery in the 17th century. They have oceanic geology, making them distinct from both mainland Asia and mainland Australia.

Japan possesses the Bonin Islands (also known as the Ogasawara Islands), the Volcano Islands, and three remote islets (Nishinoshima, Minami-Tori-shima, and Okinotorishima), all governed collectively as Ogasawara Village, which is an administrative division consisting of scattered island atolls located in the Pacific Ocean. These mostly uninhabited islands are located at some distance southeast of the Japanese archipelago. Owing to the location and oceanic nature of these islands, they are sometimes considered part of Oceania as well. The islands are within the Oceanian biogeographical realm, unlike the rest of Japan, and may have been inhabited by Micronesians around 2,000 years ago. Their official discovery came much later in the 16th century, through Europeans. The most remote island within this group, Minami-Tori-shima (also known as Marcus Island) is nearly 2,000 km removed from Tokyo, and is geographically closer to the Micronesian territories of Guam and Northern Mariana Islands. Inhabitants of the Ryukyu Islands, on the periphery of the main Japanese archipelago, are sometimes associated with Austronesians. The islands are geologically and historically linked with Asia, and are excluded from most definitions of Oceania, along with the similarly non-oceanic Japanese archipelago, which is not associated with Austronesians. To the north of Japan is the disputed Kuril Islands, currently administered by Russia. Usually, these islands are associated with the Russian Far East. This is primarily as a result of their non-tropical biogeography, and their inhabitants, who are mostly ethnically Russian mainlanders.

Australia has a more developed economy than neighboring Pacific Island nations, and is occasionally associated with mainland Asia as a result of this, despite being geologically distinct and having no cultural links to it prior to European discovery. It has historically been included in definitions of Oceania, ever since the term was first coined in the early 1810s. In the 19th century, many geographers divided up Oceania into mostly racially-based subdivisions; Australasia, Malaysia (encompassing the Malay Archipelago), Melanesia, Micronesia, and Polynesia. Australia, Guam, and Northern Mariana Islands currently compete in the Asian Football Confederation (AFC), with Australia and Northern Mariana Islands having originally been part of the Oceania Football Confederation (OFC). Guam was never an official OFC member, although they exclusively played against teams from Oceania prior to joining the AFC. The presence of these teams in the AFC is not necessarily related to geography or politics, but rather because the Asian Football Confederation have far more resources than the Oceania Football Confederation. All three are members of the Pacific Islands Forum, the major governing body for the Oceania region, with Australia being a founding member in 1971. Guam and Northern Mariana Islands have had similar histories to the rest of Micronesia, and are biogeographically and geologically distinct from mainland Asia. Palau made an unsuccessful attempt to join the Asian Football Confederation in 2009. They too share much of the same history as the rest of Micronesia, and are a member of the Pacific Islands Forum.

Taiwan has at times been associated with Oceania, not only because of their loose status as a Pacific Island, but also because of their indigenous population, who are related to the natives of Oceania. In 2010, Australian historian Bronwen Douglas claimed in The Journal of Pacific History that "a strong case could be made for extending Oceania to at least Taiwan, the homeland of the Austronesian language family whose speakers colonized significant parts of the region about 6,000 years ago." Definitions of Oceania which include Taiwan are extremely rare because Taiwan has historical ties to mainland Asia, Taiwan is close to China (being 180 km away), and Taiwan lies on the continental shelf of Asia. Taiwan was formerly a member of the Oceania Football Confederation; this was for political reasons: It was forced to compete against teams from Oceania because China, its political administrator, did not recognize its sovereignty and would not compete against them. It was a member from 1975 to 1989, but now competes as part of the Asian Football Confederation. Taiwan, Japan, and most of the nations in the Malay Archipelago are dialogue partners of the Pacific Islands Forum, but none have full membership; only Australia, New Zealand, and the island states in Polynesia, Melanesia, and Micronesia do.

== Asia and Europe ==
The boundary between Asia and Europe is unusual among continental boundaries because of its largely mountain-and-river-based characteristics north and east of the Black Sea. Asia and Europe are considered separate continents for historical reasons; the division between the two goes back to the early Greek geographers.

In the modern sense of the term "continent", Eurasia is more readily identifiable as a "continent", and Europe has occasionally been described as a subcontinent of Eurasia.

=== Mainland ===
==== History ====
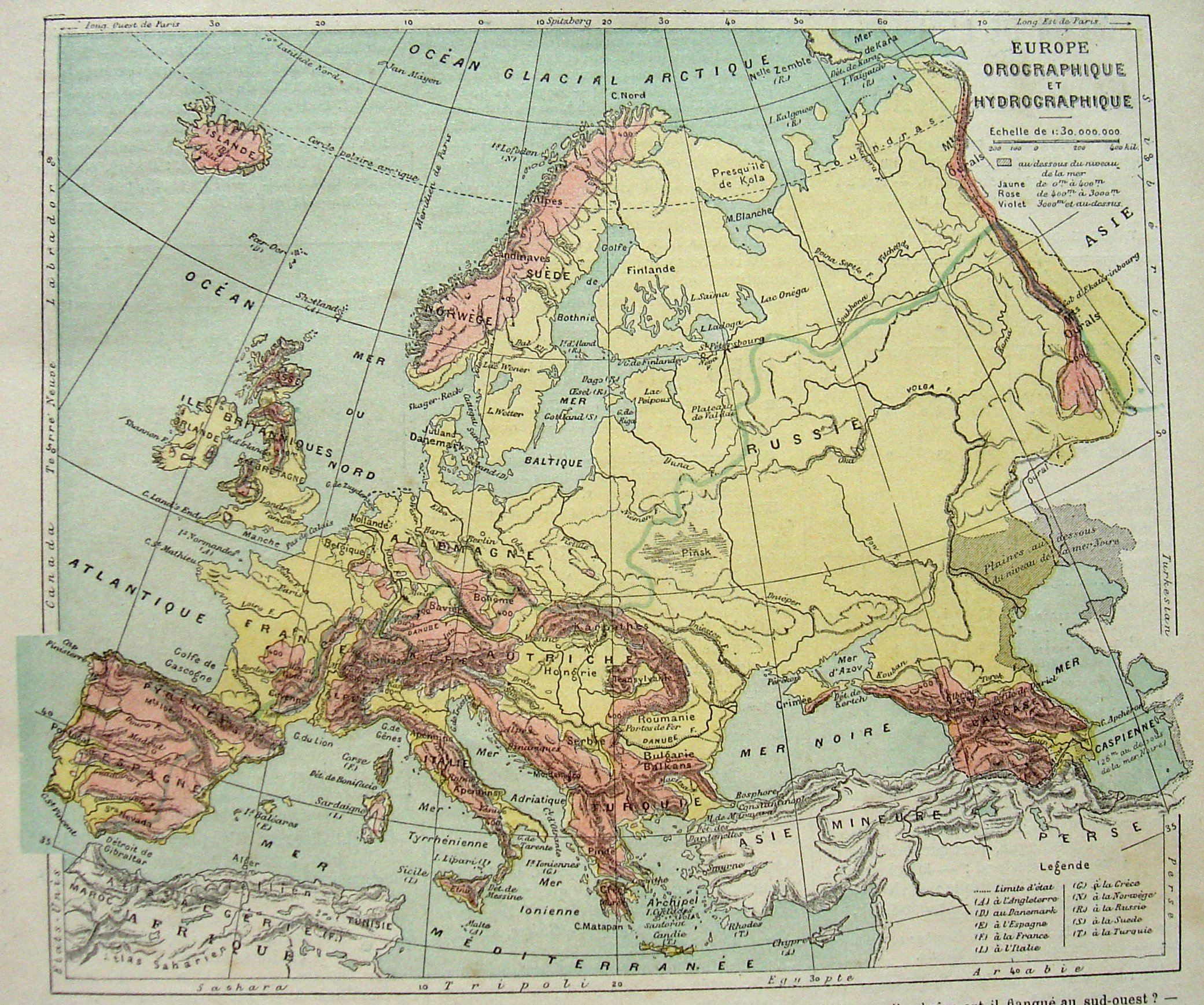
A French physical map of Europe from 1880, depicting the entirety of the Caucasus region as part of the European continent.

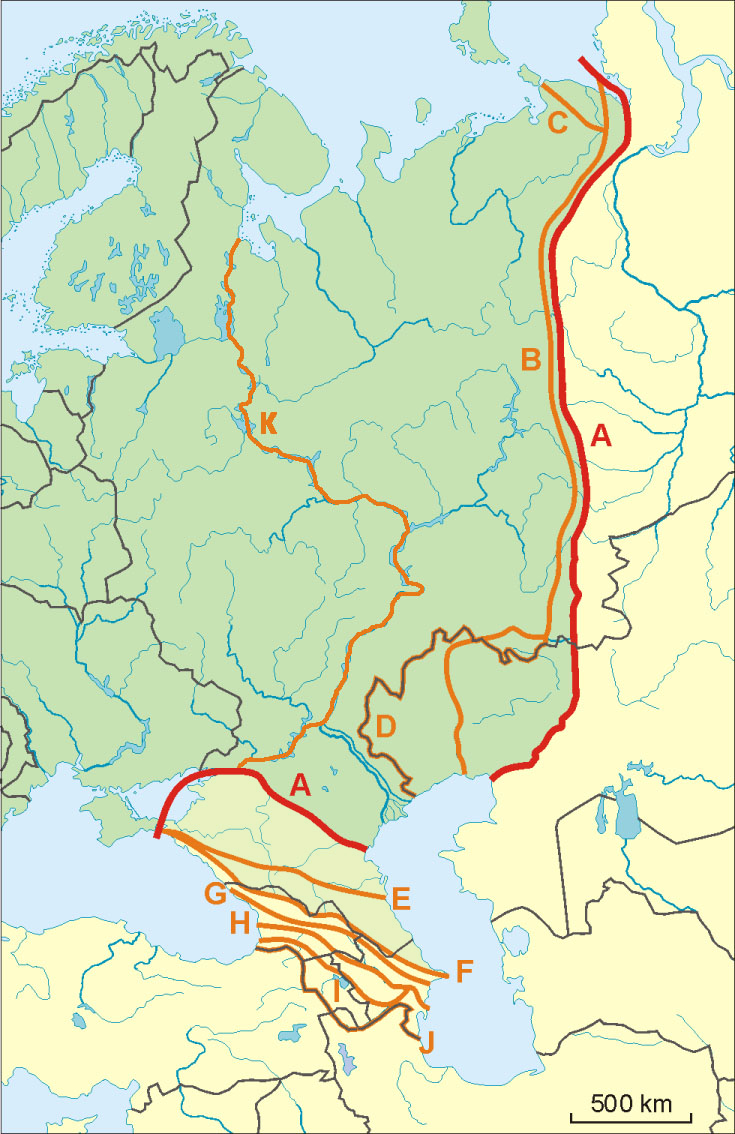
A map illustrating the evolving definition of the boundaries between Asia and Europe over the centuries. Line A (in red) used to be a widely accepted definition, but the most common definition in use today is Line B (for the east-west separation) and Line F (for the north-south separation), with the remaining definitions still being used on occasion.

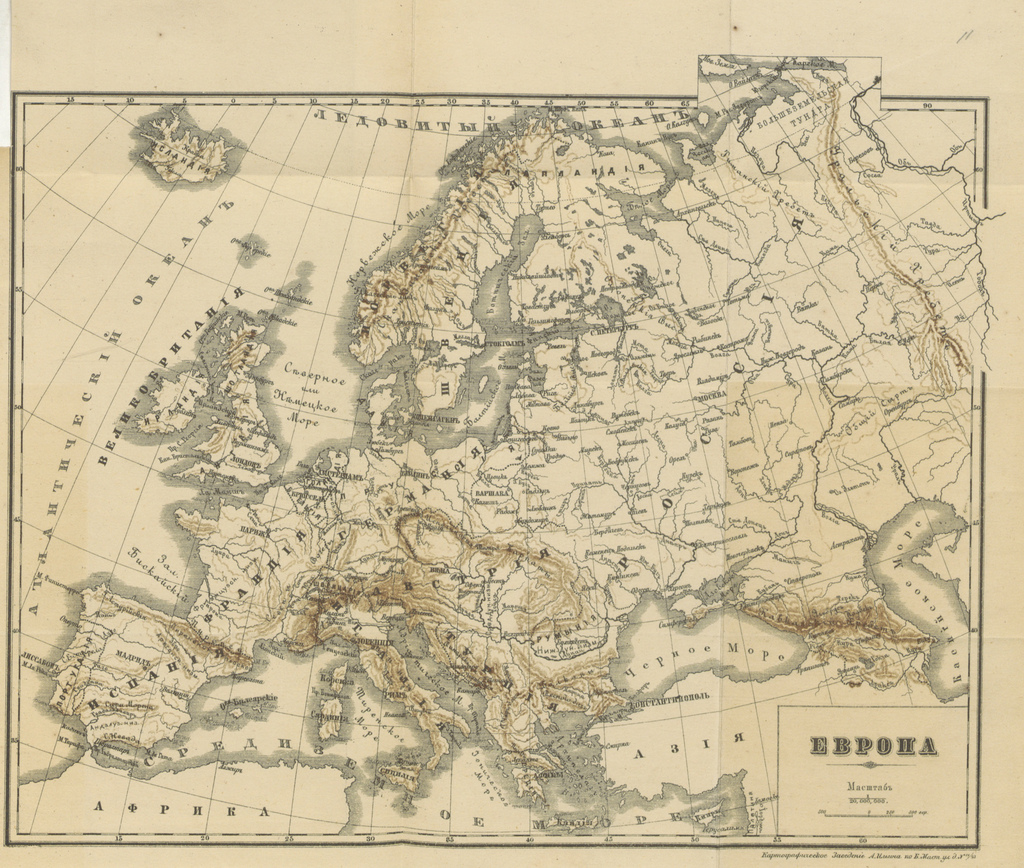
Russian Imperial map of Europe from 1874, with an alternative southern limit at the Turkish border.

The threefold division of the Old World into Africa, Asia, and Europe has been in use since the 6th century BC by early Greek geographers such as Anaximander and Hecataeus.

Anaximander placed the boundary between Asia and Europe along the Phasis River (the modern Rioni in Georgia in the Caucasus Mountains), from Rioni mouth in Poti on the Black Sea coast, through the Surami Pass and along the Kura River to the Caspian Sea, a convention still followed by Herodotus in the 5th century BC. This convention was subsequently revised and the boundary between Asia and Europe was considered to be the Tanais (the modern Don River). This is the convention used by the Roman era authors Posidonius, Strabo and Ptolemy.

Throughout the Middle Ages and into the 18th century, the traditional division of the landmass of Eurasia into two continents, Asia and Europe, followed Ptolemy, with the boundary following the Turkish Straits, the Black Sea, the Kerch Strait, the Sea of Azov, and the Don (known in antiquity as the Tanais). But maps produced during the 16th to 18th centuries tended to differ in how to continue the boundary beyond the Don bend at Kalach-na-Donu (where it is closest to the Volga, now joined with it by the Volga–Don Canal), into territory not described in any detail by the ancient geographers.

Philip Johan von Strahlenberg in 1725 was the first to depart from the classical Don boundary by drawing the line along the Volga, following the Volga north until the Samara Bend, along Obshchy Syrt (the drainage divide between the Ural and Volga rivers) and then north along the Ural Mountains. The mapmakers continued to differ on the boundary between the lower Don and Samara well into the 19th century. The 1745 atlas published by the Russian Academy of Sciences has the boundary follow the Don beyond Kalach as far as Serafimovich before cutting north toward Arkhangelsk, while other 18th- to 19th-century mapmakers such as John Cary followed Strahlenberg's prescription. To the south, the Kuma–Manych Depression was identified circa 1773 by a German naturalist, Peter Simon Pallas, as a valley that, once upon a time, connected the Black Sea and the Caspian Sea, and subsequently was proposed as a natural boundary between continents.

By the mid-19th century, there were three main conventions, one following the Don, the Volga–Don Canal and the Volga, the other following the Kuma–Manych Depression to the Caspian and then the Ural River, and the third abandoning the Don altogether, following the Greater Caucasus watershed to the Caspian. The question was still treated as a controversy in geographical literature of the 1860s, with Douglas Freshfield advocating the Caucasus crest boundary as the best possible, citing support from various modern geographers.

In Russia and the Soviet Union, the boundary along the Kuma–Manych Depression was the most commonly used as early as 1906. Despite this, outside the geographical context, the territories of the North and South Caucasus were often classified as the European part of the country, for political, economic, and historical-cultural reasons. Thus, the political boundaries of Europe in the southern section were based on political and administrative borders. According to this principle, the extended boundary between Europe and Asia followed the state border of the USSR with Turkey and Iran (now it is the border from Georgia, Armenia and Azerbaijan). In 1958, the Soviet Geographical Society formally recommended that the boundary between Asia and Europe be drawn in textbooks from Baydaratskaya Bay, on the Kara Sea, along the eastern foot of the Ural Mountains, then following the Ural River until the Mugodzhar Hills, and then the Emba River; and Kuma–Manych Depression, thus placing the Caucasus entirely in Asia and the Urals entirely in Europe. However, most geographers in the Soviet Union favoured the boundary along the Caucasus crest and this became the standard convention in the latter 20th century, although the Kuma–Manych boundary remained in use in some 20th-century maps.

==== Modern definition ====
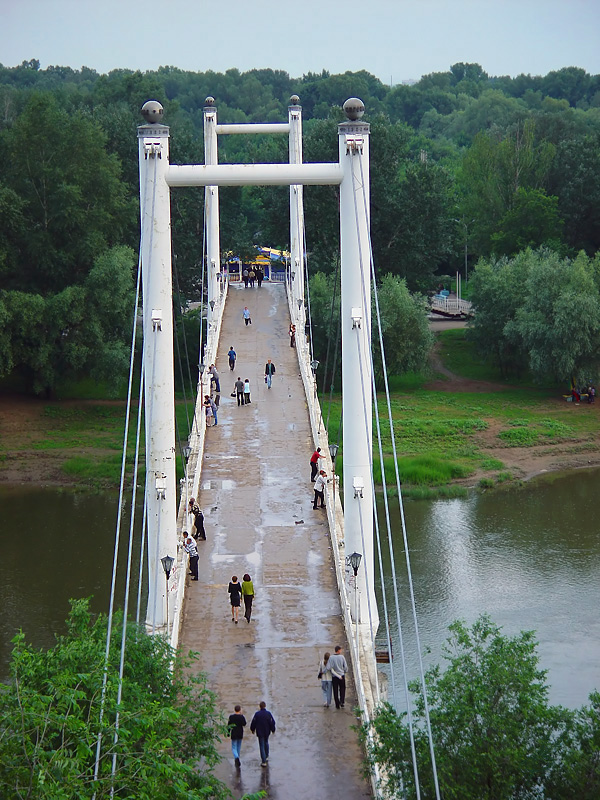
Pedestrian bridge over the Ural River in Orenburg in Russia. The bridge is between Asia and Europe

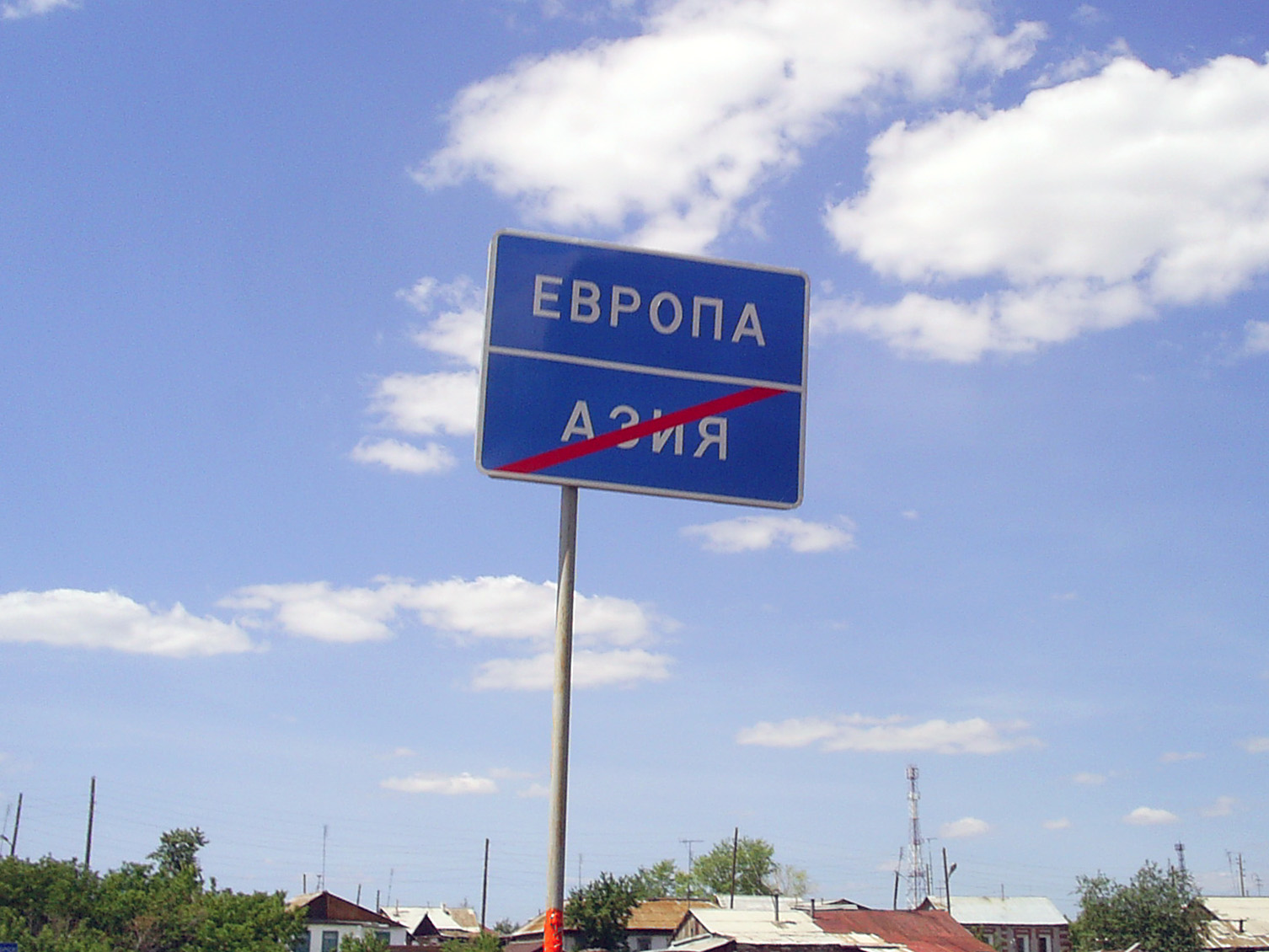
Road sign on the continental border between Asia and Europe near Magnitogorsk, Ural Mountains, Russia. It reads "Europe", above a crossed-out "Asia", as one enters Europe and leaves Asia

The modern border between Asia and Europe is a historical and cultural construct and, for that reason, its definition has varied. One commonly accepted border follows the Aegean Sea, the Dardanelles–Sea of Marmara–Bosporus (together known as the Turkish Straits), the Black Sea, along the watershed of the Greater Caucasus, the northwestern portion of the Caspian Sea, and along the Ural River and Ural Mountains to the Kara Sea, as mapped and listed in most atlases including that of the National Geographic Society and as described in The World Factbook. According to this particular definition, Georgia is a transcontinental country with some of its northern portions (such as Kazbegi Municipality, Khevsureti, and Tusheti) geographically located in Eastern Europe, north of the Greater Caucasus Watershed, whereas the country's south is arguably in Asia. Similarly, according to this one particular definition, Azerbaijan is a transcontinental country with some northern portions (e.g. Khachmaz, Quba, Qusar, Shabran, and Siazan) located north of the Greater Caucasus Watershed and thus geographically in Europe, whereas the rest arguably falls under Asia. Georgia actively identified as European throughout the 19th and 20th centuries. In the 21st century, Georgia is regarded as a European country for historical, cultural, religious, and political reasons.

The international geographic community has never reached a universal agreement on continental borders, especially with regard to the Caucasus region between the Black and Caspian seas. As Encyclopædia Britannica explains:

"The watershed of the Greater Caucasus, the backbone of the system, traditionally has been part of the line dividing Europe and Asia, but Europe's eastern boundary has been the subject of much debate. One widely accepted scheme draws the dividing line along the crest of the Greater Caucasus range, putting the portion of the region north of the line in Europe and the portion south of it in Asia. Another puts the western portion of the Caucasus region in Europe and the eastern part (the bulk of Azerbaijan and small portions of Armenia, Georgia, and Russia's Caspian Sea coast) in Asia. Still another scheme identifies the Aras River and the Turkish border as the line of continental demarcation, thereby locating Armenia, Azerbaijan, and Georgia in Europe."

Russia and Turkey are transcontinental states with territory in both Asia and Europe by any definition. Russia is historically, culturally, and politically a European state, with a history of imperial conquests in Asia. The situation for Turkey is inverse, as that of an Asian country with imperial conquests in Europe. Kazakhstan is also a transcontinental state by this definition, with its West Kazakhstan and Atyrau provinces extending on either side of the Ural River, although it is considered a Central Asian country that extends to Europe. The Turkish city Istanbul is a transcontinental city because it lies on both sides of the Bosporus (one of the Turkish Straits). The Russian and Kazakhstani cities of Magnitogorsk, Orenburg, and Atyrau fall on the Ural River, making them transcontinental cities as well.

This Ural River delineation is the only segment not to follow a major mountain range or wide water body, both of which often truly separate populations. However, the Ural River is the most common division used by authorities, is the most prominent natural feature in the region, and is the "most satisfactory of those (options) proposed" which include the Emba River, a much smaller stream cutting further into Central Asian Kazakhstan. The Ural River bridges in Atyrau and Orenburg are even labeled with permanent monuments carved with the word "Europe" on one side, "Asia" on the other.

Because the Kazakhs are an Asian people, after the collapse of the USSR, the option according to which the border of Europe runs from the Caspian Sea along the state border between Russia and Kazakhstan to the Ural River has also gained popularity.

The Kuma–Manych Depression (more precisely, the Manych River, the Kuma–Manych Canal, and the Kuma River) remains cited less commonly as one possible natural boundary in contemporary sources. This definition peaked in prominence in the 19th century; however, it has declined in usage over time. This is because it included in Asia certain areas of Russia in Ciscaucasia (such as Stavropol, Krasnodar, and areas just south of Rostov-on-Don) seen as too European to be Asian.

One formal means by which states are grouped into one specified continental area or another is by using the definition used for statistical purposes by the United Nations Statistics Division (UNSD): According to UNSD, "assignment of countries or areas to specific groupings is for statistical convenience and does not imply any assumption regarding political or other affiliation of countries or territories". Furthermore, the UNSD classification often differs from those of other United Nations organizations. For instance, while UNSD includes Georgia and Cyprus in Western Asia, the United Nations Industrial Development Organization and UNESCO include both states in Europe.

The Council of Europe and the European Political Community includes transcontinental or Eurasian states, such as Armenia, Azerbaijan, Cyprus, Georgia, and Turkey as members. Cyprus is a member of the European Union, whereas the European Parliament noted that Armenia and Georgia are eligible to apply for EU membership "like any other European state". On 14 December 2023, Georgia was officially granted EU Candidate status. On 12 February 2025, the Armenian parliament unanimously adopted a law initiating Armenia's accession process to the EU. Turkey, despite having territories in both Asia and Europe, is still a candidate for EU membership.

The Treaty on Conventional Armed Forces in Europe defined the eastern boundary of Europe to be the Ural Mountains, Ural River, and Caspian Sea. However, it also included all of the territory of the then-Soviet republics of Armenia, Azerbaijan, and Georgia, as well as areas of Turkey north of the 39th parallel (among other areas of Turkey).

=== Islands ===
Cyprus is an island of the Mediterranean located on the Asian continental shelf, geologically a part of the Anatolian Plate and adjacent to Anatolia, by which it is sometimes associated with Asia (Western Asia), as in the United Nations geoscheme. Despite differences regarding its geographic affiliation, the Republic of Cyprus was nevertheless admitted to the Council of Europe in 1961 and joined the EU in 2004. The northern part of the island functions as the unrecognized (except by Turkey) Turkish Republic of Northern Cyprus.

The Greek North Aegean islands and the Dodecanese lie on the coast of the Asian part of Turkey (on the Asian continental shelf). Thus, generally, these island groups could be considered part of Asia. More specifically, the small islands of Kastellorizo, Strongyli Megistis, and Ro (all these islands are still in the Dodecanese group) are directly to the south of the Turkish Anatolia coastline, of which they are directly adjacent. Additionally, they lie at some distance to the east of the rest of the Dodecanese group in the direction of Cyprus and the Turkish city of Antalya. Akin to Cyprus, these small islets would nominally be considered Asian if only the continental shelf were used to define the boundary, but for history and cultural influences they are considered a part of Europe.

Russia's Vaygach Island and Novaya Zemlya extend northward from the northern end of the Ural Mountains and are a continuation of that chain into the Arctic Ocean. While Novaya Zemlya was variously grouped with Europe or with Asia in 19th-century maps it is now usually grouped with Europe, the continental boundary considered to join the Arctic Ocean along the southern shore of the Kara Sea. The Russian Arctic archipelago of Franz Josef Land farther north is also associated with Europe.

== Asia and North America ==
The Bering Strait and Bering Sea separate the landmasses of Asia and North America, as well as forming the international boundary between Russia and the United States. This national and continental boundary separates the Diomede Islands in the Bering Strait, with Big Diomede in Russia and Little Diomede in the U.S. The Aleutian Islands are an island chain extending westward from the Alaskan Peninsula toward Russia's Komandorski Islands and Kamchatka Peninsula. Most of them are always associated with North America, except for the westernmost Near Islands group, which is on Asia's continental shelf beyond the North Aleutians Basin and on rare occasions could be associated with Asia, which could then allow the U.S. state of Alaska to be considered a transcontinental state. The Aleutian Islands are sometimes associated with Oceania, owing to their status as remote Pacific islands, and their proximity to the Pacific Plate. This is extremely rare, however, because of their non-tropical biogeography and because their inhabitants have historically been related to Indigenous Americans.

St. Lawrence Island in the northern Bering Sea belongs to Alaska and may be associated with either continent but is almost always considered part of North America, as with the Rat Islands in the Aleutian chain. At their nearest points, Alaska and Russia are separated by only 4 kilometres (2.5 miles).

== Europe and North America ==
The geographical notion of a continent stands in opposition to islands and archipelagos. Nevertheless, there are some islands that are considered part of Europe in a political sense. This most notably includes the British Isles (part of the European continental shelf and during the Ice Age of the continent itself); the islands of the North Sea, the Baltic Sea, and the Mediterranean that are part of the territory of a country situated on the European mainland; the Azores on the Mid-Atlantic Ridge, part of Portugal; and usually also the island states of Iceland (part of Norway and/or Denmark from 13th to early 20th centuries) and Malta.

The Norwegian islands of Jan Mayen and Svalbard in the Arctic Ocean are usually associated with Europe.

South of the Arctic, Europe and North America are separated by the North Atlantic. In terms of associating its oceanic islands with either continent, the boundary is usually drawn between Greenland and Iceland and between Bermuda and the Azores' Grupo Ocidental (Western Group)—all other North Atlantic islands are continental. Iceland and the Azores are protrusions of the Mid-Atlantic Ridge and are associated with and peopled from Europe, even though they have areas on the North American Plate. (Definitions of "continents" are a physical and cultural construct dating back centuries, long before the advent or even knowledge of plate tectonics; thus, defining a "continent" falls into the realm of physical and cultural geography (i.e. geopolitics), while continental plate definitions fall under plate tectonics in the realm of geology.) Some definitions of the Europe – America continental boundary place it on (the northern half of) the Mid-Atlantic Ridge, which would make Iceland a transcontinental country.

Greenland is geographically part of North America. Politically, however, it is more associated with Europe as it is part of the Kingdom of Denmark, although it has extensive home rule and EU law no longer applies there. The United Nations consider Greenland to be part of North America; this is unusual, as the United Nations categorize many nations and territories purely on political convention rather than geographical or cultural convention. The Greenland national football team, while not officially part of any confederation, has historically competed against teams from Europe, rather than North America.

Three islands in the Caribbean are legally a direct part of the Netherlands, that is the Caribbean Netherlands (Bonaire, Saba, and Sint Eustatius). Two islands in the Caribbean are legally a direct part of France, Guadeloupe and Martinique.

== North America and South America ==
=== Mainland ===
The border between North America and South America is at some point on the Darién Mountains watershed that divides along the Colombia–Panama border where the isthmus meets the South American continent (see Darién Gap). Virtually all atlases list Panama as a state falling entirely within North America and/or Central America.

=== Islands ===
Often the Caribbean islands are considered part of North America, but Aruba, Bonaire, Curaçao (ABC islands), and Trinidad and Tobago lie on the continental shelf of South America. On the other hand, the Venezuelan Isla Aves and the Colombian San Andrés and Providencia lie on the North American shelf. Additionally, the adjacent Venezuelan islands of Nueva Esparta and the islands of the Venezuelan Federal Dependencies can be considered part of the Caribbean instead of part of South America. The circumstance of these islands is akin to that of the ABC islands, as both the ABC islands and the Venezuelan islands are at an equivalent range from the Venezuelan mainland. Thus, these Venezuelan lands could consequently be placed in North America instead.

== Oceania and the Americas ==
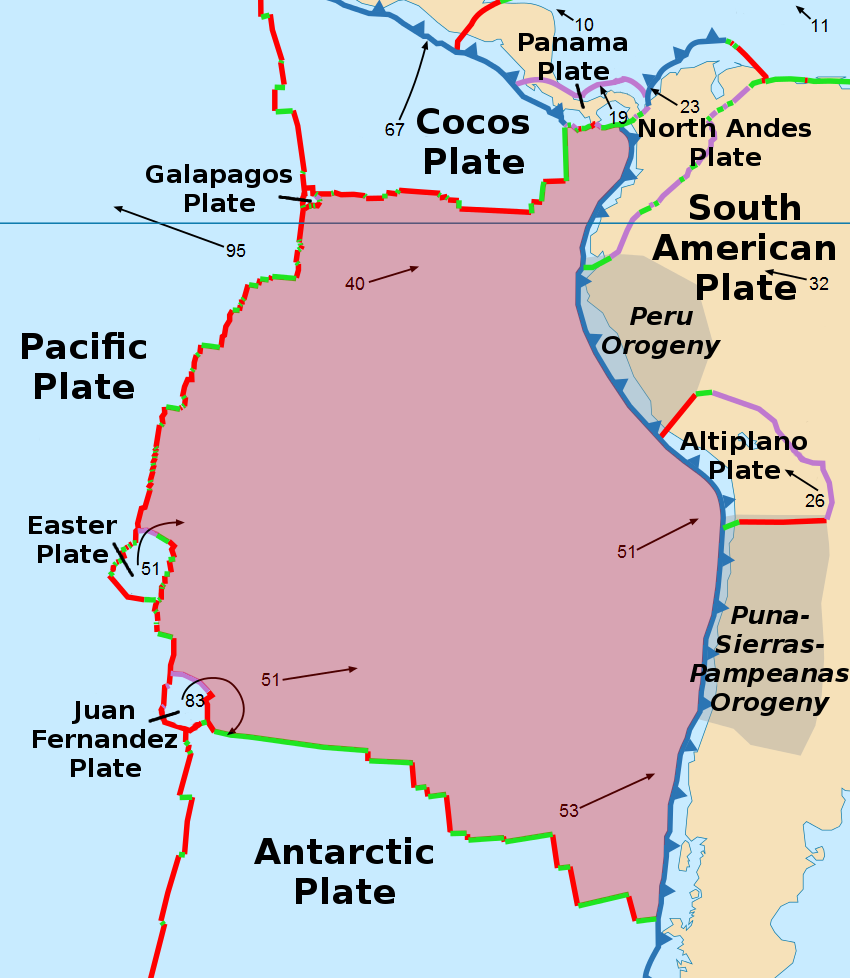
A map of the Nazca Plate (depicted in pink). It is considered to be a tectonic plate separate from the neighboring South American Plate, and contains several oceanic islands of the South Pacific, which have been associated with both Oceania and South America.

The Galápagos Islands and Malpelo Island in the southeastern Pacific Ocean are possessions of Ecuador and Colombia, respectively. Malpelo Island, located 500 km from Colombia, is nominally associated with South America, while the Galápagos Islands, 1,000 km from Ecuador, are also sometimes associated with Oceania. The Galápagos Islands lie on the Nazca Plate and are thought of as part of Oceania because of their geographical distance from South America in the Pacific Ocean and their oceanic geology. Malpelo is one of only two islands on the Cocos Plate (with the other being Costa Rica's Cocos Island). It is among the easternmost and least remote of the oceanic island groups in the southeastern Pacific. The French possession of Clipperton Island lies on the Pacific Plate, about 1,000 km off the Mexican coast, and roughly 300 km to the south of Mexico's oceanic Revillagigedo Islands, which are also on the Pacific Plate. It is associated with North America, as well as with Oceania. Oceanic southeastern Pacific islands such as Clipperton and Galápagos were never inhabited by Indigenous peoples of the Americas, unlike with the Atlantic Ocean's Caribbean Islands. Clipperton remains uninhabited, and its marine fauna maintains interconnectivity to the marine fauna of Hawaii and Kiribati's Line Islands, with the island being labelled as a stepping stone between the south central Pacific and the southeastern Pacific. The Galápagos Islands similarly share interconnectivity with French Polynesia. Until 2007, Clipperton was administratively part of French Polynesia (formerly French Oceania). It has historically had very little contact with the Americas.

Easter Island, also known by its endonym Rapa Nui, is a territory located on the Nazca Plate, and is roughly 3,500 km off the Chilean coast. Because of its original inhabitants, It is culturally part of the Oceania subregion Polynesia, though politically it came to be associated with South America. Easter Island was annexed by Chile in 1888, but their first major contact with South America came during the 1860s, when islanders were kidnapped by Peruvians for slavery. This was also the case with other Polynesian islands, including Cook Islands, Niue, and Tokelau, who lost significant amounts of their populations through the Peruvian kidnappings. Easter Island under Chilean rule has still made attempts to become politically involved with the rest of the South Pacific, and has considered gaining representation in the Pacific Islands Forum, which includes Australia, New Zealand and most of the Pacific Island nations/territories. Similar to Easter Island, and just to the northeast of it, is the nearby uninhabited Salas y Gómez Island of Chile, which is also considered to be geographically in Oceania while associated with South America politically. The island was never inhabited, yet it was known about by the natives of Easter Island during prehistoric times. The name for the island in their language was Motu Motiro Hiva. Additionally, Chile has the oceanic Desventuradas Islands, 850 km removed from the country, and the Juan Fernández Islands, which are 650 km removed. Both are located on the Nazca Plate and to the east of Salas y Gómez and Easter Island. Akin to Clipperton and Galápagos, the Desventuradas Islands and the Juan Fernández Islands were uninhabited prior to European discovery. They too are associated with both the American continent and Oceania. The marine fauna of the Desventuradas Islands and Juan Fernández Islands shares great similarity with the south central Pacific, more so than with the nearing South America. Some consider the islands to be the easternmost areas of the Oceanian biogeographical realm. Scientific journal PLOS One describe Easter Island, the Desventurudas Islands, the Juan Fernández Islands, and Salas y Gómez (collectively titled Insular Chile) as having "cultural and ecological connections to the broader insular Pacific."

== See also ==
- Borders of the oceans
- Continental divide
- List of countries bordering on two or more oceans
  - List of former transcontinental countries
  - The empire on which the sun never sets
- List of sovereign states and dependent territories by continent
- Pluricontinentalism
- Tricontinental Chile
