= Nogai =

Nogai may refer to:

- Nogai Khan, a de facto ruler of the Golden Horde
- Nogai Horde, a Turkic state which split from the Golden Horde in late 15th century
- Nogais, a Turkic people
- Nogai language, the language spoken by the Nogais
- Nogai steppe, Russia
