= Sautatá =

- Vereda
- Location in Chocó and Colombia Sautatá (Colombia)
- Coordinates: 7°51′0″N 77°7′0″W
- Country: Colombia
- Department: Chocó
- Municipality: Rio Sucio Municipality
- Elevation: 6.6 ft (2 m)
- Time zone: UTC-5 (Colombia Standard Time)

Sautatá is a vereda in Riosucio Municipality, Chocó Department in Colombia. The administration of Los Katíos National Park is located in Sautatá.

== Climate ==
Sautatá has a tropical monsoon climate (Am) with little rainfall from January to March and heavy rainfall in the remaining months.

Climate data for Sautatá
Month	Jan	Feb	Mar	Apr	May	Jun	Jul	Aug	Sep	Oct	Nov	Dec	Year
Mean daily maximum °C (°F)	31.6 (88.9)	32.0 (89.6)	32.3 (90.1)	32.2 (90.0)	31.8 (89.2)	31.7 (89.1)	31.9 (89.4)	31.9 (89.4)	31.7 (89.1)	31.5 (88.7)	31.4 (88.5)	31.4 (88.5)	31.8 (89.2)
Daily mean °C (°F)	26.8 (80.2)	27.0 (80.6)	27.2 (81.0)	27.4 (81.3)	27.4 (81.3)	27.3 (81.1)	27.2 (81.0)	27.2 (81.0)	26.9 (80.4)	26.8 (80.2)	26.7 (80.1)	26.6 (79.9)	27.0 (80.7)
Mean daily minimum °C (°F)	22.0 (71.6)	22.0 (71.6)	22.1 (71.8)	22.6 (72.7)	23.0 (73.4)	22.9 (73.2)	22.5 (72.5)	22.5 (72.5)	22.1 (71.8)	22.1 (71.8)	22.0 (71.6)	21.8 (71.2)	22.3 (72.1)
Average rainfall mm (inches)	56.6 (2.23)	44.3 (1.74)	50.8 (2.00)	139.4 (5.49)	209.7 (8.26)	256.2 (10.09)	238.3 (9.38)	238.3 (9.38)	239.9 (9.44)	235.9 (9.29)	216.9 (8.54)	131.8 (5.19)	2,058.1 (81.03)
Average rainy days	5	4	5	11	17	17	17	18	18	18	15	9	154
Average relative humidity (%)	84	83	81	84	87	86	86	86	86	86	87	86	85
