= Los Katíos National Park =

National park

Los Katíos National Natural Park
- PNN Los Katíos
- IUCN category II (national park)
- Location within Colombia
- Location: Antioquia & Chocó, Colombia
- Coordinates: 7°40′0″N 77°00′0″W
- Area: 720 km^{2} (280 sq mi)
- Established: August 6, 1974
- Governing body: SINAP

UNESCO World Heritage Site
- Type: Natural
- Criteria: ix, x
- Designated: 1994 (18th session)
- Reference no.: 711
- Region: Latin America and the Caribbean
- Endangered: 2009–2015

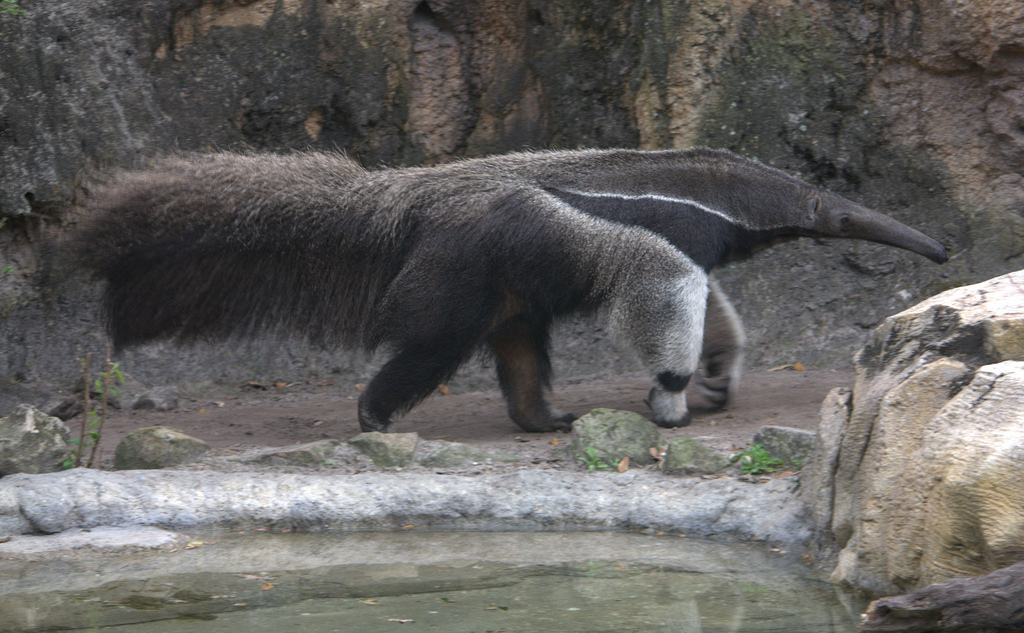
The Giant Anteater, one of the inhabitants of Los Katíos.

Los Katíos National Natural Park (Spanish: Parque Nacional Natural (PNN) Los Katíos) is a protected area located in northwest Colombia which covers about 720 km^{2} (280 sq mi). The elevation ranges between 50 and 600 m (160 and 1,970 ft). It is a part of the Darién Gap, a densely forested area shared by Panama and Colombia, and is contiguous with the Darién National Park in Panama. The Pan-American Highway, when completed as proposed, would pass near or through Los Katíos. The park was declared a UNESCO World Heritage Site in 1994 due to the extraordinary diversity of plant and animal species represented.

The topography of the Los Katios National Park is diverse, with low hills, forests and wet plains comprising its total area.

The two largest parts of the park are the Serranía del Darién mountains, which lie to the west, and the Atrato River floodplains in the east. The floodplains hold exceptionally fertile soil and consist of alluvial plains of two types. One consists of low-lying terraces that flood often and the other has high terraces that seldom flood. There are also low hills of up to 250 metres (820 ft) in elevation and others that are 600 metres (2,000 ft) high. Swampy marshes spread for nearly half of the park's total area. The wetlands of the Atrato floodplain are unique. Cativo, one of the indigenous species, can grow to a height of 50 metres (160 ft). It lends its name to a formation called 'catival' and is found nowhere in the world except Colombia, south Central America and Jamaica.

== Significance ==
Los Katíos National Park has exceptionally high biodiversity and (along with the adjacent Darien National Park in Panama), is a center of endemism, with many species that are restricted to the region. The park is home to at least 450 species of birds. In fact, over 25% of the bird species reported for Colombia in an area less than 1% of the total Colombian territory. Almost 20% of the plant species in the park are endemic to the Chocó-Darién moist forests.

Due to its geographical location in northern Colombia on the southern edge of the Central American land bridge, this region served as a filter for the exchange of animal species between North and South America in the Tertiary and Pleistocene periods. This process continues today, and Los Katíos is the only region in South America where many Central American taxa are common, including yew species, the Giant anteater, and the Central American tapir.

The park also protects important landscape features such as the 25 m high Tendal waterfall, the 100 m high Tilupo waterfall and the Tumaradó swamps.

In 1990, the park was made accessible by paths and accommodation for small groups of visitors, who have access to the national park through the park administration in Sautatá.

== History ==
The region was originally inhabited by the Guna, an indigenous group who, after internal fighting, had to surrender the Choc region to the Katío-Embera and emigrated to Panama. The Darién region, to which Los Katíos belongs, was historically important for the first settlers who used the land bridge from North to South America some 20,000 years ago. In the post-Columbian period, the Spanish conquistadors Rodrigo de Bastidas, Alonso de Ojeda and Vasco Núñez de Balboa were the first to discover this region in 1501.

In more recent times, about one percent of the park in the Sautatá area was agriculturally developed and used primarily for the cultivation of sugar cane. After the park was established in 1974, over the next seven years the 150 or so local families were relocated to the nearby towns of Unguía, Puente América, Tumaradó and Cacarica.

The park was placed on the List of World Heritage in Danger in 2009 at the request of the Colombian government to handle threats to its protection, notably deforestation, unauthorized settlements, illegal fishing and hunting.

In 2015, the park was removed from the List of World Heritage in Danger due to significant improvements in the management of the park and of steps taken by the national authorities to reduce illegal extraction of timber and overfishing.
