= Serranía del Darién =

Mountain range in Colombia and Panama

- Location within Colombia Location within Panama

Highest point
- Peak: Cerro Tacarcuna
- Elevation: 1,875 m (6,152 ft)
- Coordinates: 8°10′N 77°18′W

Dimensions
- Length: 35 km (22 mi)

Geography
- Countries: Colombia and Panama
- Biome: Rainforest

The Serranía del Darién is a small mountain range on the border between Colombia and Panama in the area called the Darién Gap. It is located in the southeastern part of the Darién Province of Panama and the northwestern part of the Chocó Department of Colombia. There are two major protected areas here: Darién National Park in Panama and Los Katíos National Park in Colombia. Serranía del Darién range's average elevation above sea level is 437 metres (1,434 ft). These mountains have sparse settlements, with just two people living in every square kilometer. This lack of human settlements is reflected in the fact that the nearest town with a population of 50,000 is over 12 hours away by road.

== Geological hazards ==
The Serranía del Darién is notorious for strong earthquakes; on average earthquakes measuring between 6 and 7 occur here every 50 years. The area is also susceptible to floods and landslides, both of which have been classified as medium to high intensity hazards for the region.

== Climate ==
Serranía del Darién is a humid region. Its climate falls under the tropical monsoon type.

== Flora and fauna ==
Species that are endemic to the Serranía del Darién include the toad Rhinella acrolopha.
