= Terek–Kuma Lowland =

Lowland in southern Russia

- Lowland
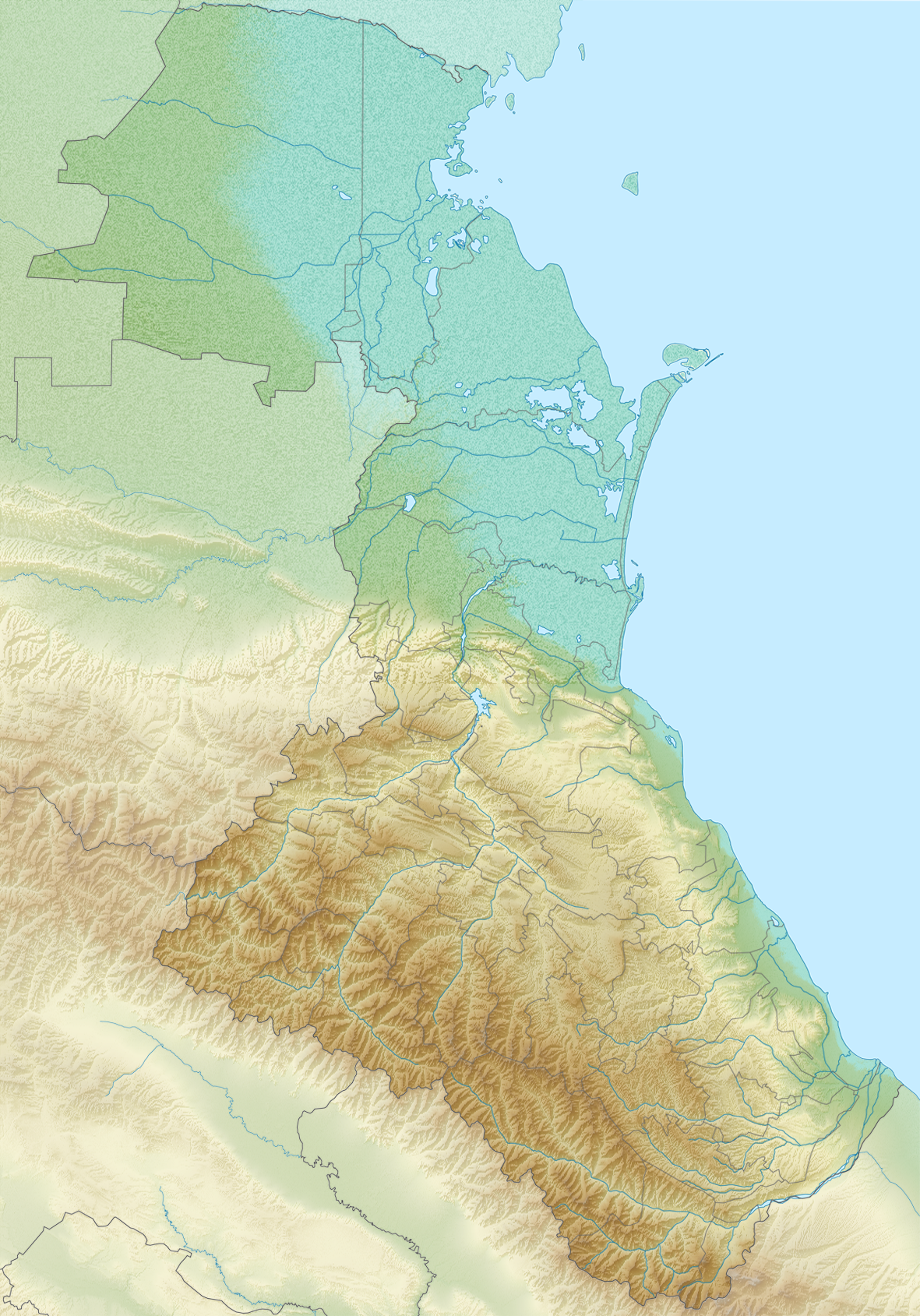
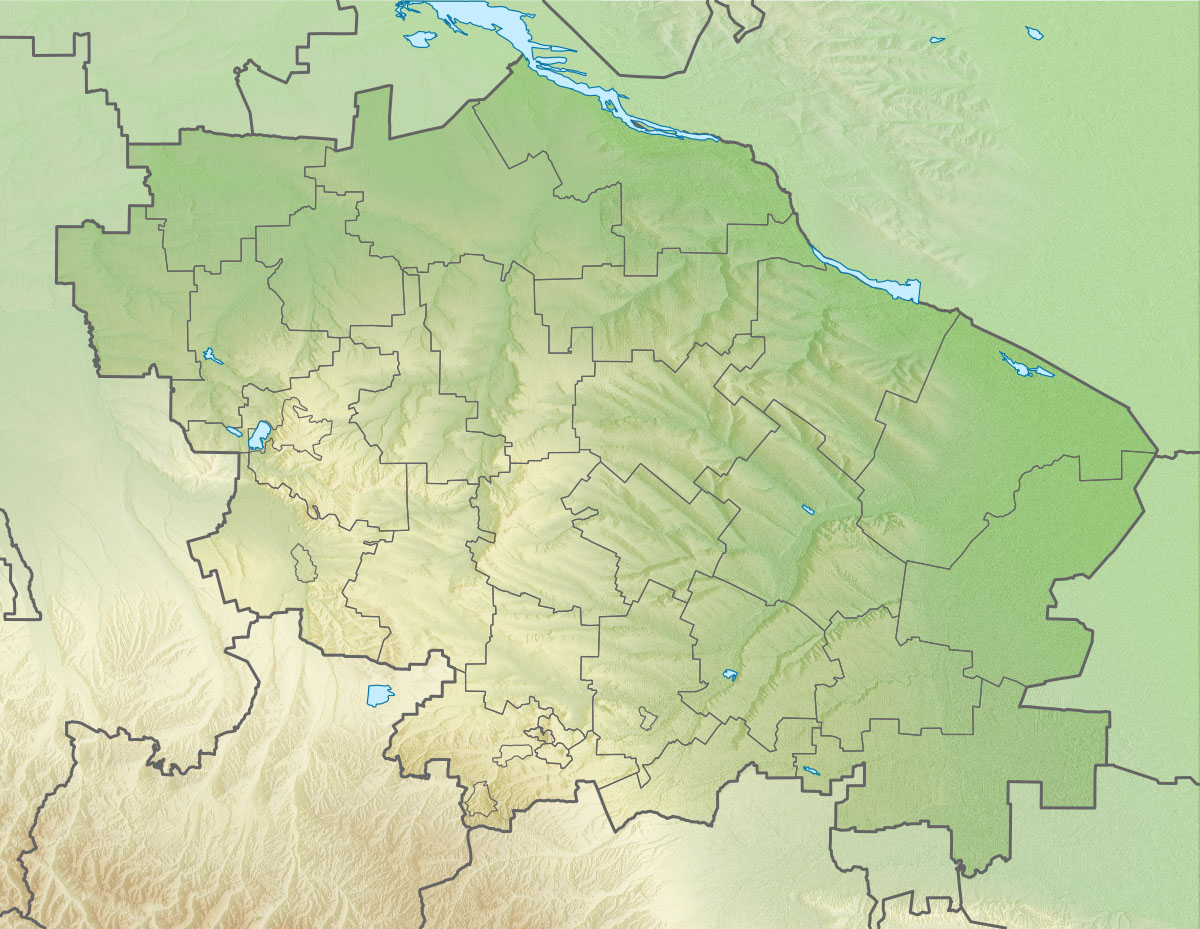
- Coordinates: 44°30′N 45°30′E

Dimensions
  - Depth: 27 m
- Elevation: 100 m (330 ft)

The Terek-Kuma Lowland (Russian: Терско-Кумская низменность) is the lowland in the southwestern part of the Caspian Depression in southern Russia, in Republic of Dagestan, Stavropol Krai and Chechen Republic. It has altitudes between 28 m below sea level and 100 m above sea level, constituting the eastern part of Ciscaucasia.

== Geography ==
Terek-Kuma lowland is bounded by the Kuma–Manych Depression in the north, the Caspian Sea in the east, the Greater Caucasus range in the south and the Stavropol Upland in the west. The lowland is named after its major rivers, the Kuma and the Terek.

Another important river flowing through the lowland is the Sulak. The lowland is covered by sandy semi-deserts, dry steppes and reed marshes in the deltas. The Terek-Kuma sands between the Kuma and Terek valleys are also known as the Nogai Steppe (Russian: Ногайская степь).

== Sources ==
- Williams, Victoria R. (24 February 2020). "Nogai". Indigenous Peoples: An Encyclopedia of Culture, History, and Threats to Survival [4 volumes]. Bloomsbury Publishing USA. pp. 812–815. ISBN 978-1-4408-6118-5.
