= Kuma (Russia) =

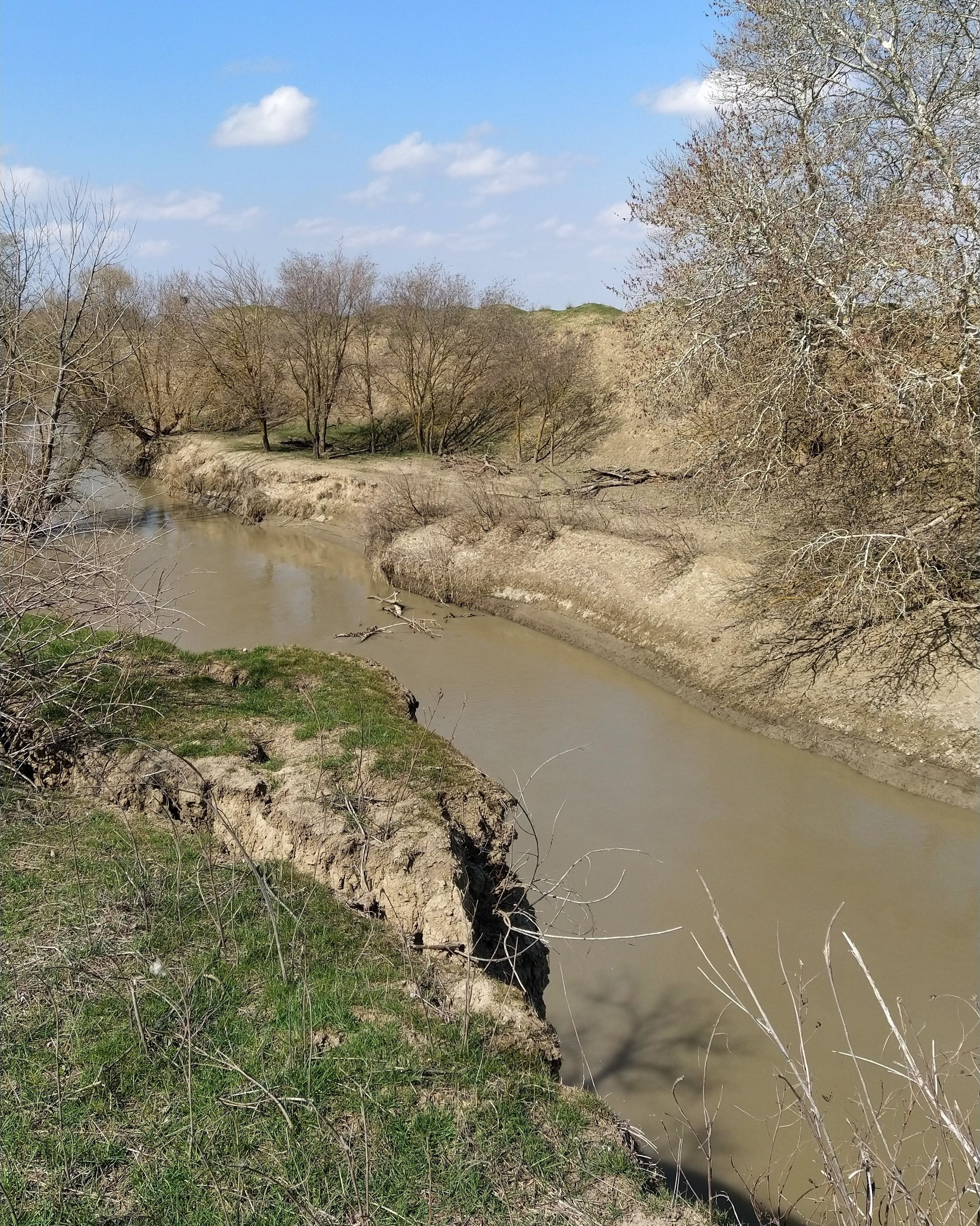

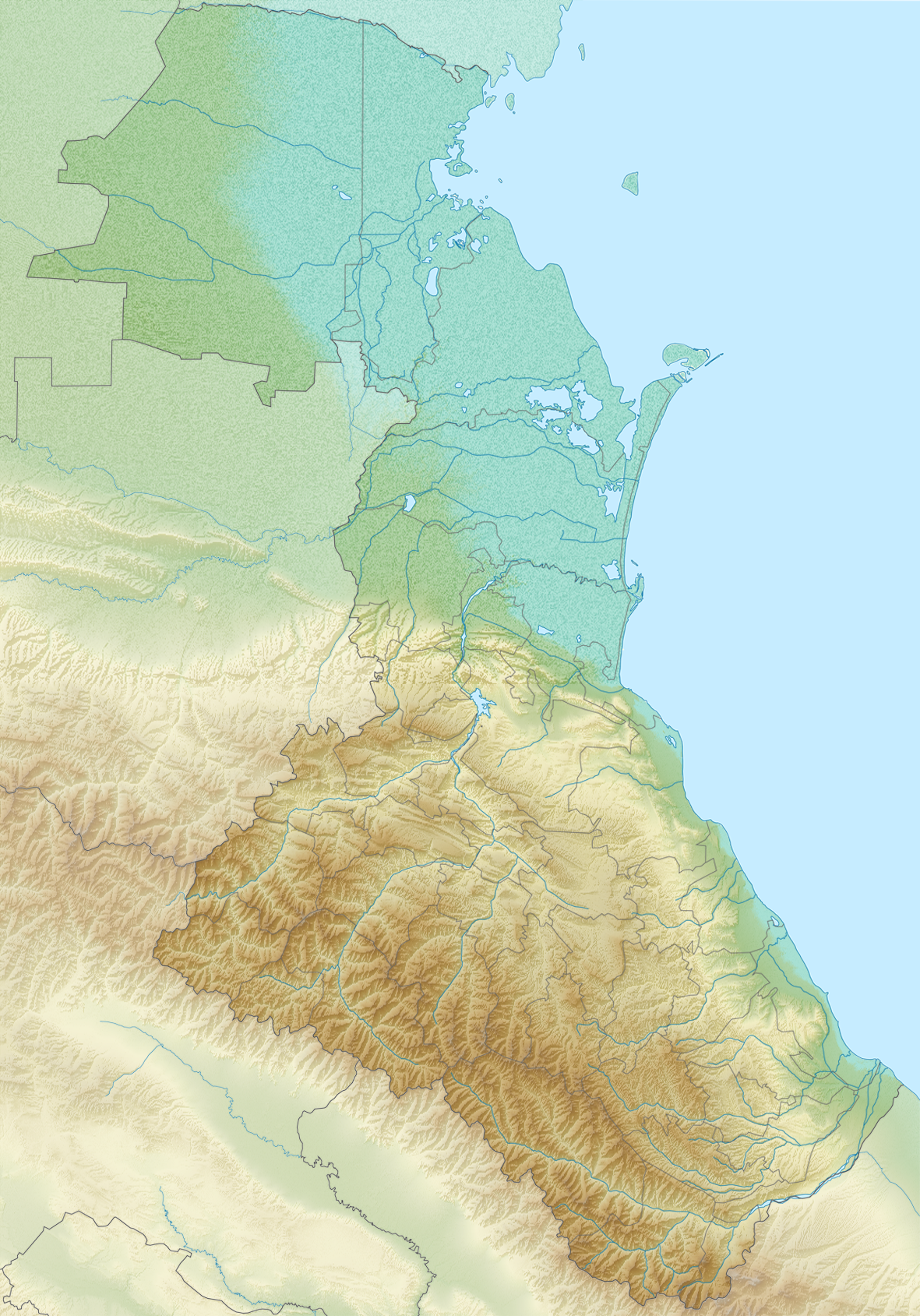
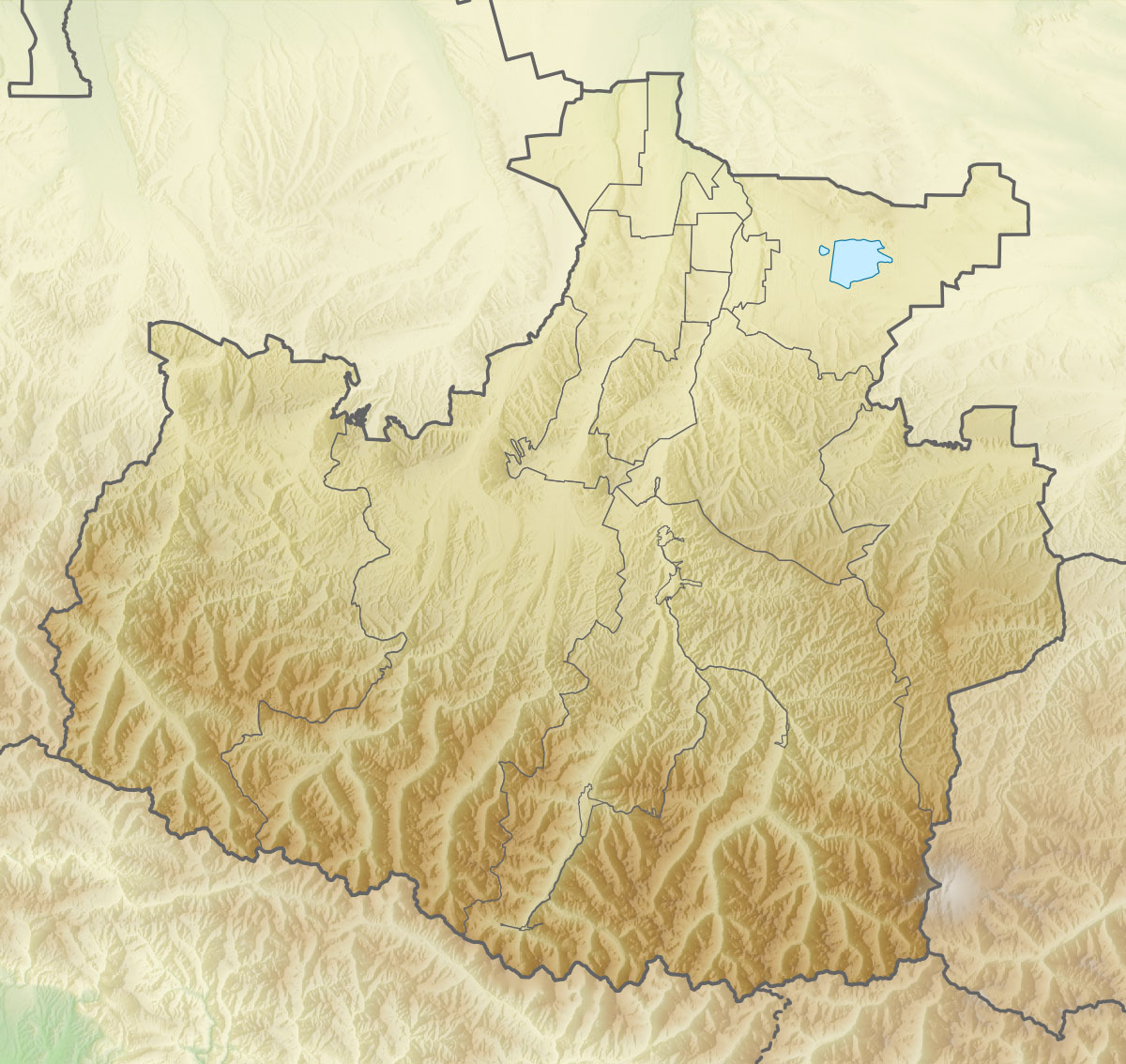

Location
- Country: Russia

Physical characteristics
- Source: Skalisty Range, Caucasus
  - location: 43°49′44″N 42°06′19″E
- Mouth: Caspian Sea
  - coordinates: 44°48′36″N 46°54′02″E
- Length: 802 km (498 mi)
- Basin size: 33,500 km^{2} (12,900 sq mi)

Basin features
- Tributaries
  - right: Podkumok

The Kuma (Russian: Кума́) is a river in the North Caucasus region of southern Russia. It flows northeast into the Caspian Sea. It is 802 kilometres (498 mi) long and has a drainage basin of 33,500 square kilometres (12,900 sq mi). Its source is in the Greater Caucasus, in the republic Karachay-Cherkessia, west of Kislovodsk. It flows in a northeastern direction, through Stavropol Krai (towns Mineralnye Vody, Zelenokumsk, Budyonnovsk, Neftekumsk) and further east through the Caspian Depression as the natural border between the Kalmykia and Dagestan republics of Russia. That part of the Kuma's valley forms the eastern part of the Kuma–Manych Depression, separating the East European Plain from the Caucasus region. The Kuma flows into the Kizlyar Gulf of the Caspian Sea near the border between Dagestan and Kalmykia.

Most of the rivers that flow north from the Caucasus Mountains and into Terek–Kuma Lowland are caught by the Kuban and Terek. It rises between the basins of those two rivers, so the Kuma is mainly a steppe river. It is much used for irrigation.

== Construction projects ==
If the plans for the proposed Eurasia Canal, linking the Caspian Sea with the Black Sea, are ever implemented, it will likely follow the Kuma River valley in its eastern section.
