= Lake Manych-Gudilo =

Saltwater lake in Kalmykia, Russia

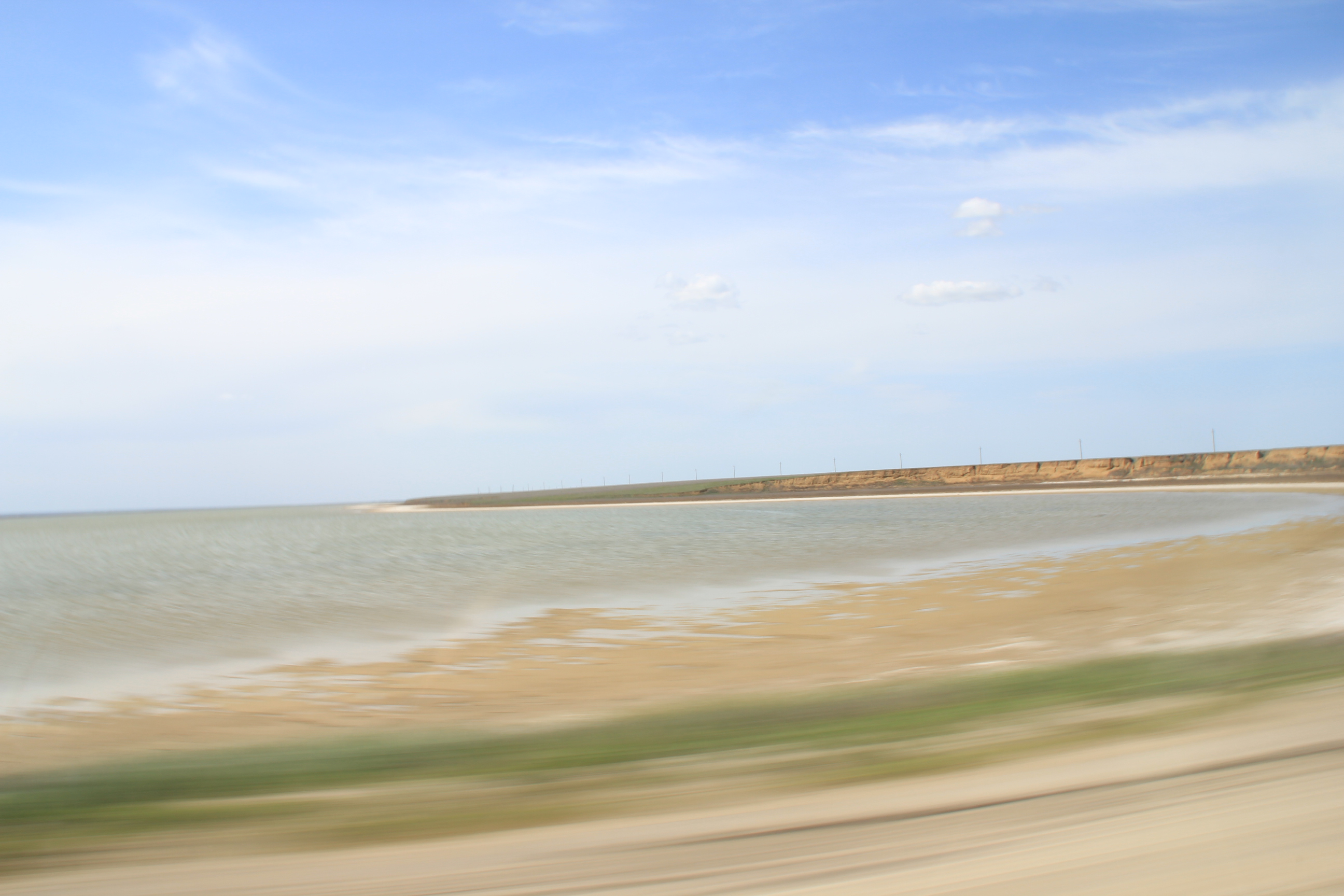
- Lake Manych Gudilo coastline

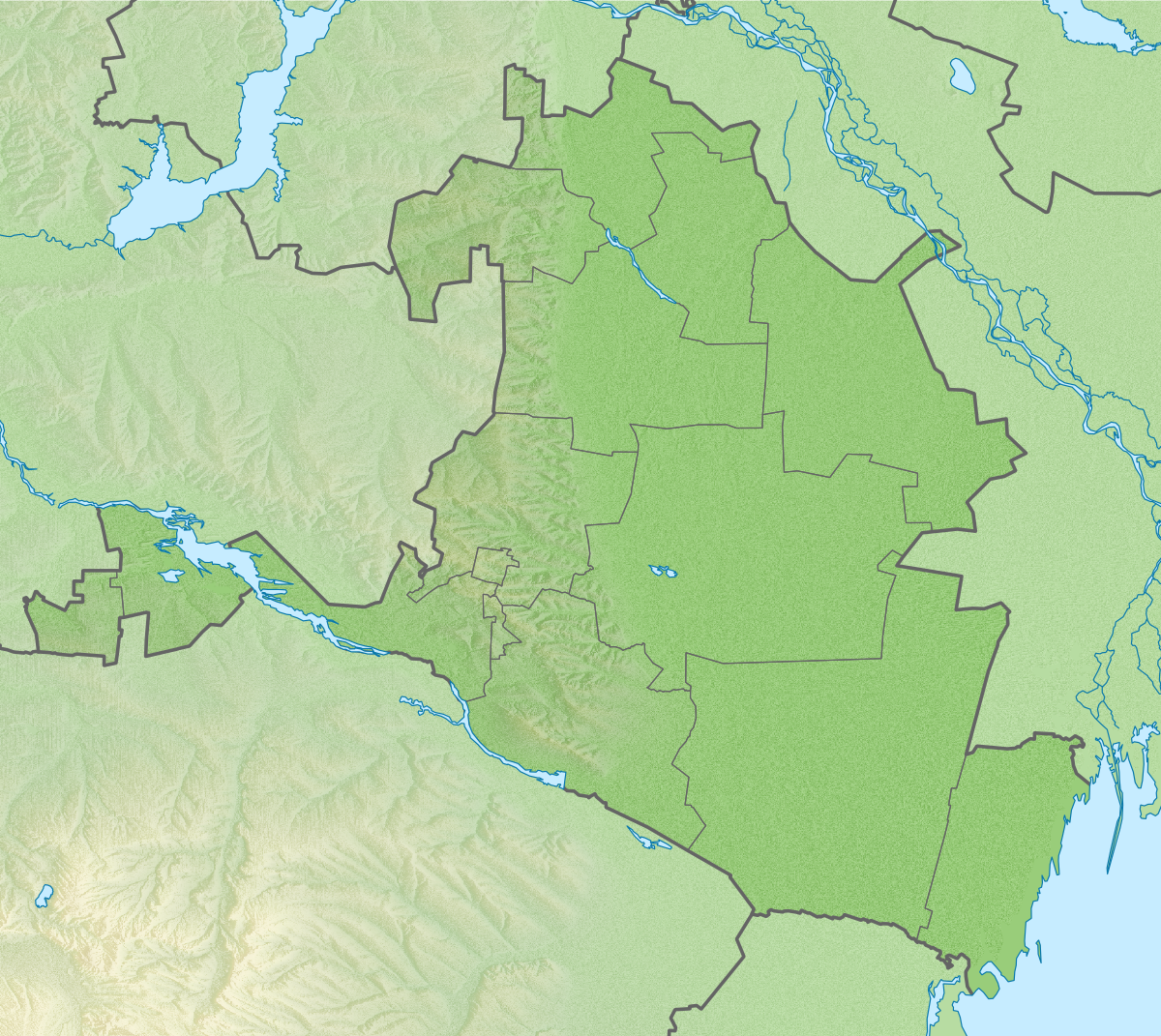
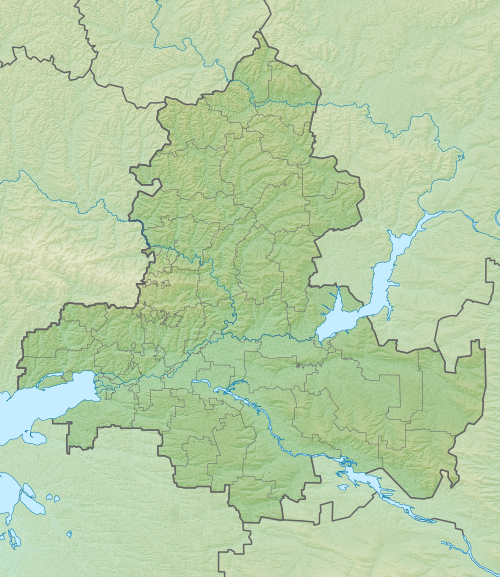
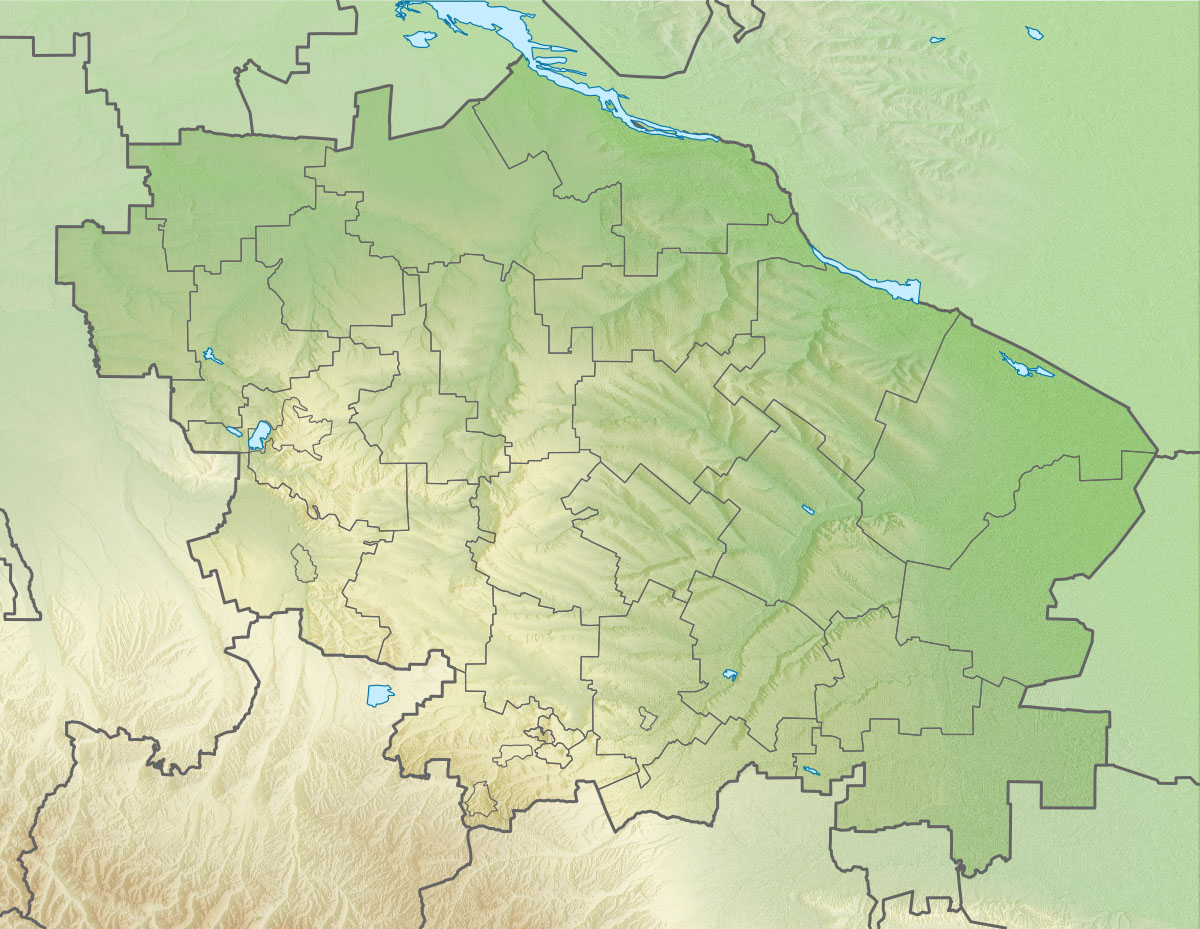
- Location within Kalmykia Location within Rostov Oblast Location within Stavropol Krai Location within European Russia
- Location: Kalmykia
- Coordinates: 46°20′09″N 42°47′58″E
- Lake type: Saline
- Primary outflows: Sea of Azov (via the West Manych River)
- Basin countries: Russia
- Surface area: 344 km^{2} (133 sq mi)
- Average depth: 0.6 m (2 ft 0 in)
- Max. depth: 2.2 m (7 ft 3 in)
- Surface elevation: 8 m (26 ft)

Ramsar Wetland
- Official name: Lake Manych-Gudilo
- Designated: 13 September 1994
- Reference no.: 673

Lake Manych-Gudilo (Russian: Ма́ныч-Гуди́ло) is a large saltwater reservoir lake in Kalmykia, Russia. Part of the lake lies also in Rostov Oblast and Stavropol Krai. It has an area of about 344 km^{2} and average depth of only about 0.6 m.

Lake Manych-Gudilo is the source of the West Manych River, which flows north-west, through a number of reservoirs, falling into the lower Don a short distance upstream from Rostov-on-Don and the Don's fall into the Sea of Azov.

Temperatures in the region through the year can range from −30 °C (−22 °F) in winter to 40 °C (104 °F) in summer. The area is also home to many species of birds and is the site of the Chernye Zemli Biosphere Reserve.

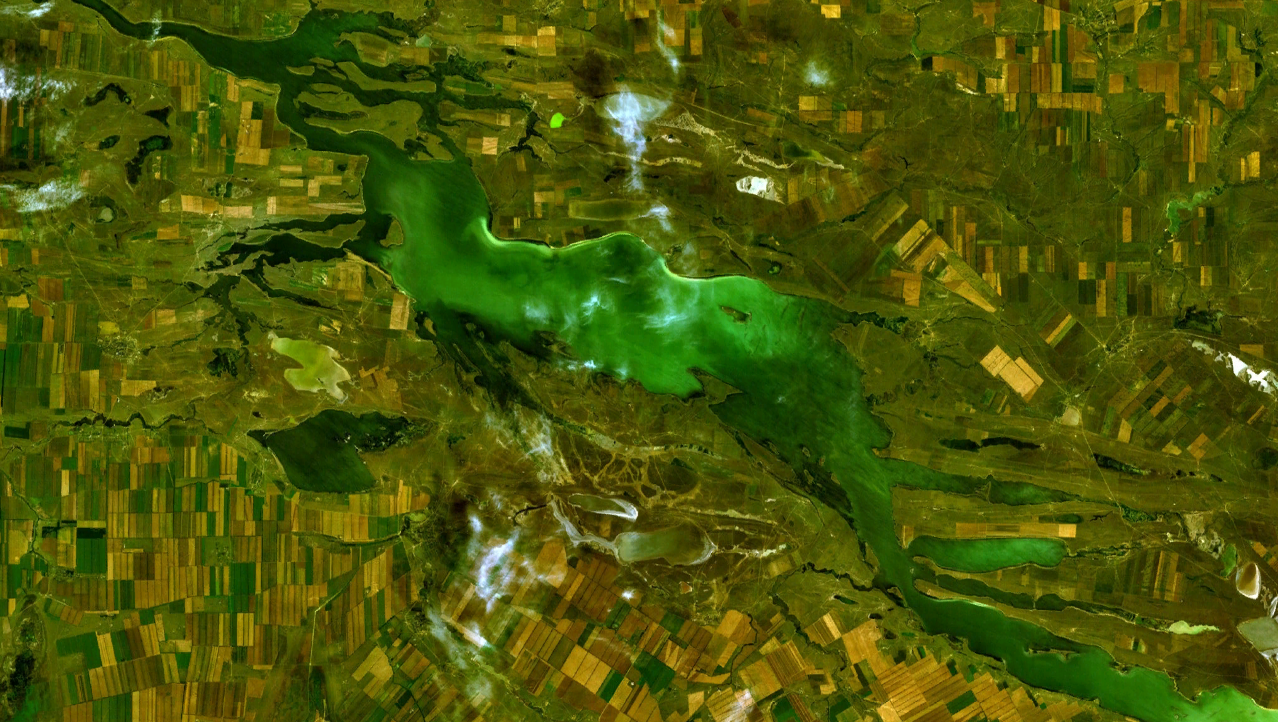
Manych-Gudilo as seen from space

A global sea level rise of roughly 25 metres (80 ft) would cause the ocean surface to be higher than the highest point of an area between the ocean and the Caspian, forming a narrow channel straddling the lake in the area between the Sea of Azov and the Caspian Sea, potentially placing the Caspian Depression area underwater.

== See also ==
- Aral Sea – Lake in Kazakhstan and Uzbekistan
- Black Sea undersea river – Saline water current in the Black Sea
- Paratethys – Prehistoric shallow inland sea in Eurasia
