= Caspian Sea =

Lake in Eurasia

- Azerbaijani: Xəzər dənizi, Turkmen: Hazar deňzi, Kazakh: Каспий теңізі, Russian: Каспийское море, Persian: دریای خَزَر or دریای مازَندَران, Latin: Caspium mare
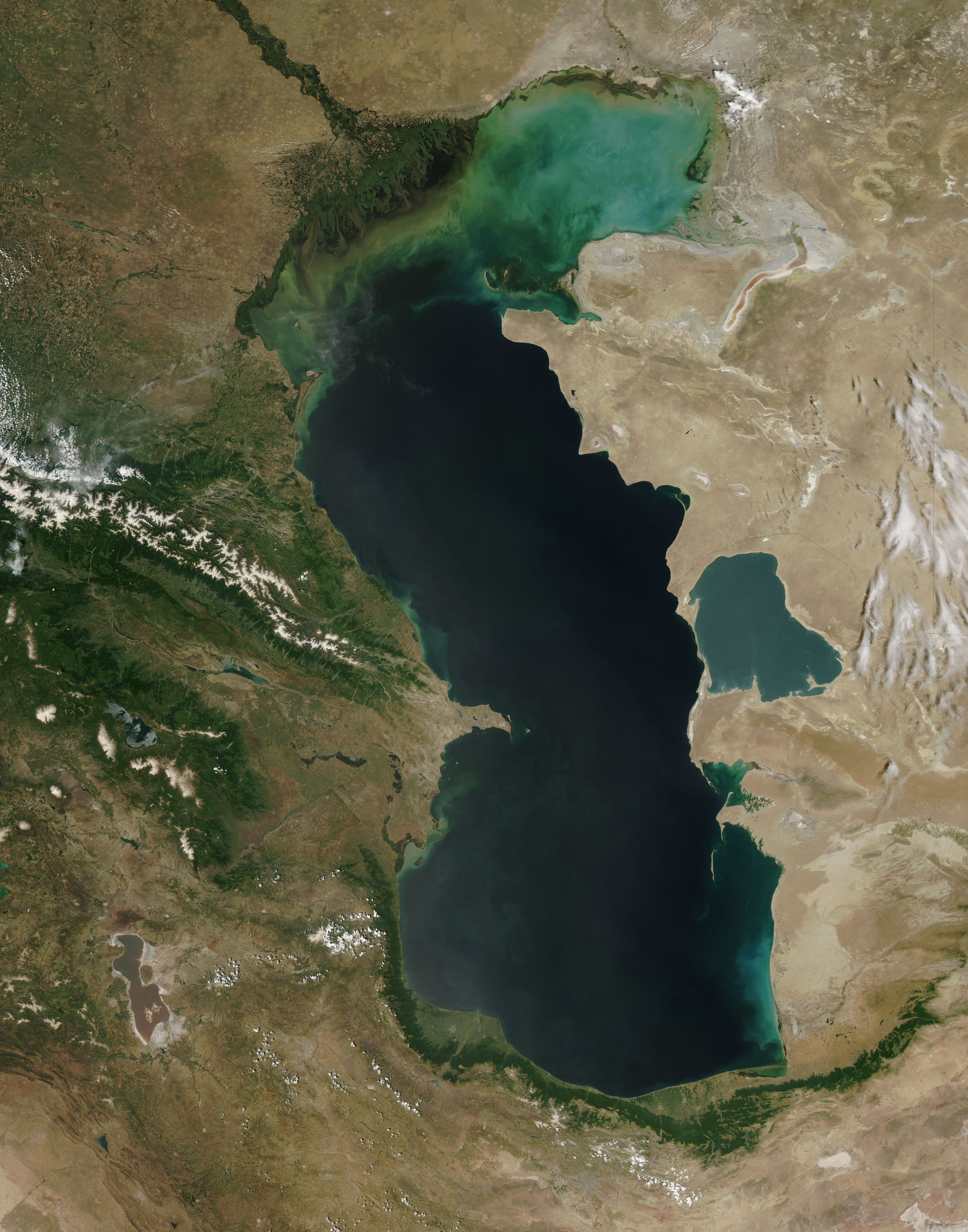
- The Caspian Sea seen from the Terra satellite

- Location within West and Central Asia Location within Asia Location within Afro-Eurasia
- Location: Eastern Europe, West Asia, and Central Asia
- Coordinates: 42.0°N 50.5°E
- Type: Ancient lake, Endorheic, saline, permanent, natural
- Primary inflows: Volga River, Ural River, Kura River, Terek River, Haraz River, Sefid-Rud
- Primary outflows: Evaporation
- Catchment area: 3,626,000 km^{2} (1,400,000 sq mi)
- Basin countries: Iran, Azerbaijan, Kazakhstan, Turkmenistan, Russia (specifically Astrakhan Oblast, Dagestan and Kalmykia)
- Max. length: 1,030 km (640 mi)
- Max. width: 435 km (270 mi)
- Surface area: 389,000 km^{2} (150,194 sq mi)
- Average depth: 211 m (690 ft)
- Max. depth: 1,025 m (3,360 ft)
- Water volume: 78,200 km^{3} (18,800 cu mi)
- Residence time: 250 years
- Shore length^{1}: 7,000 km (4,300 mi)
- Surface elevation: −28 m (−92 ft)
- Islands: 26+
- Settlements: Baku (Azerbaijan), Bandar-e Anzali (Iran), Aqtau (Kazakhstan), Lankaran (Azerbaijan), Makhachkala (Russia), Türkmenbaşy (Turkmenistan) (see article)
- ^{1} Shore length is not a well-defined measure.

The Caspian Sea is the world's largest inland body of water, also described as the world's largest lake and usually referred to as a full-fledged sea. An endorheic basin, it is situated in both Europe and Asia: east of the Caucasus, west of the broad steppe of Central Asia, south of the fertile plains of Southern Russia in Eastern Europe, and north of the mountainous Iranian Plateau. It covers a surface area of 371,000 km^{2} (143,244 sq mi) (excluding the highly saline lagoon of Garabogazköl to its east), an area similar to Japan, with a volume of 78,200 km^{3} (19,000 cu mi). It has a salinity of approximately 1.2% (12 g/L), about a third of the salinity of average seawater. It is bounded by Kazakhstan to the northeast, Russia to the northwest, Azerbaijan to the southwest, Iran to the south, and Turkmenistan to the southeast. The name of the Caspian Sea is derived from the ancient Iranic Caspi people.

The lake stretches 1,200 km (750 mi) from north to south, with an average width of 320 km (200 mi). Its gross coverage is 386,400 km^{2} (149,200 sq mi) and the surface is about 27 m (89 ft) below sea level. Its main freshwater inflow, Europe's longest river, the Volga, enters at the shallow north end. Two deep basins form its central and southern zones. These lead to horizontal differences in temperature, salinity, and ecology. The seabed in the south reaches 1,023 m (3,356 ft) below sea level, which is the third-lowest natural non-oceanic depression on Earth after Baikal and Tanganyika lakes.

The Caspian Sea is home to a wide range of animal species. It is famous for its caviar and oil industries. Pollution from the oil industry and dams on rivers that drain into it have harmed its ecology. It is predicted that during the 21st century, the depth of the sea will decrease by 9–18 m (30–60 ft) due to global warming and the process of desertification, leading to an ecocide.

== Etymology ==
The sea's name stems from Caspi, the ancient people who lived to the southwest of the sea in Transcaucasia. Strabo (died circa AD 24) wrote that "to the country of the Albanians (Note: Caucasian Albania, not to be confused with the country of Albania) belongs also the territory called Caspiane, which was named after the Caspian tribe, as was also the sea; but the tribe has now disappeared". Moreover, the Caspian Gates, part of Iran's Tehran province, may evince such people migrated to the south. The Iranian city of Qazvin shares the root of its name with this common name for the sea. The traditional and medieval Arabic name for the sea was Baḥr al-Khazar ("sea of the Khazars"), but in recent centuries the common and standard name in the Arabic language has become بحر قزوين Baḥr Qazvin, the Arabized form of Caspian. In modern Russian: Каспи́йское мо́ре, Kaspiyskoye more.

Some Turkic ethnic groups refer to it with the Caspi(an) descriptor; in Kazakh it is called Каспий теңізі, Kaspiy teñizi, Kyrgyz: Каспий деңизи, romanized: Kaspiy deñizi, Uzbek: Kaspiy dengizi. Others refer to it as the Khazar sea: Turkmen: Hazar deňzi; Azerbaijani: Xəzər dənizi, Turkish: Hazar Denizi. In all these the first word refers to the historical Khazar Khaganate, a large empire based to the north of the Caspian Sea between the 7th–10th centuries.

In medieval Georgian chronicles, the sea is referred to as the "Sea of Darububandi" (Georgian: დარუბანდის ზღვა, darubanis zghva ), referencing the port-city Darubandi.

In Iran, the lake is called the Mazandaran Sea (Persian: دریای مازندران), after the historic Mazandaran Province at its southern shores.

Old Russian sources use the Khvalyn or Khvalis Sea (Хвалынское море / Хвалисское море) after the name of Khwarezmia.

Among Greeks and Persians in classical antiquity it was the Hyrcanian Sea (Hyrcanium Mare).

Renaissance European maps labelled it as the Abbacuch Sea (Oronce Fine's 1531 world map), Mar de Bachu (Ortellius' 1570 map), or Mar de Sala (the Mercator 1569 world map).

It was also sometimes called the Kumyk Sea and Tarki Sea (derived from the name of the Kumyks and their historical capital Tarki).

== Basin countries ==
=== Border countries ===
==== North ====
- Kazakhstan
- Russia

==== East ====
- Turkmenistan

==== West ====
- Azerbaijan

==== South ====
- Iran

=== Former border countries ===
==== North and East ====
- Soviet Union
- Russian Empire

==== North ====
- Tsardom of Russia

==== South ====
- Pahlavi Iran
- Qajar Iran
- Zand Iran
- Afsharid Iran
- Safavid Iran

== Physical characteristics ==
=== Formation ===
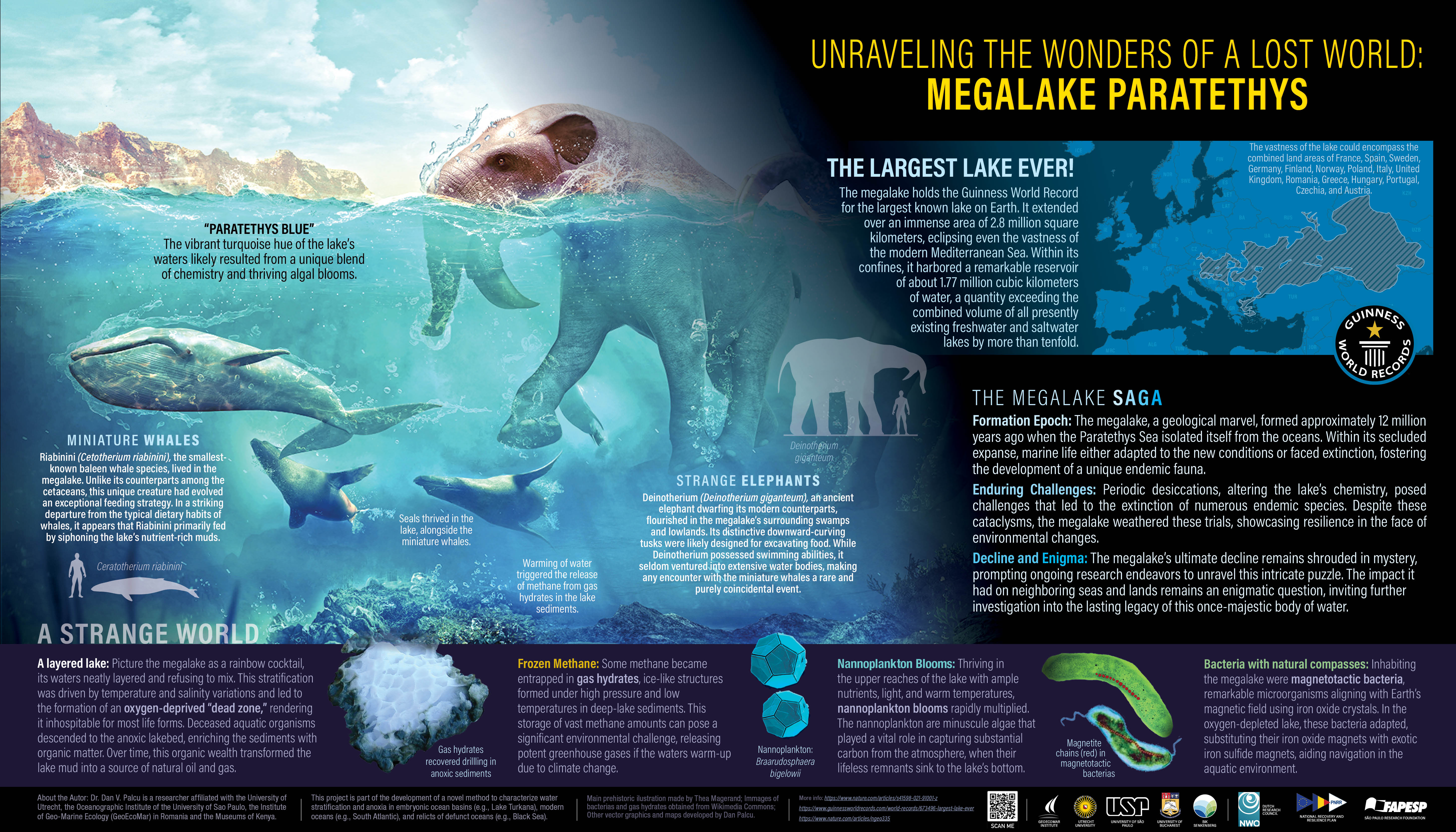
Separation of the Paratethys Sea from open seas formed a megalake, the basis of the Caspian Sea and other bodies of water in vicinity, resulting in confinements of oceanic faunas such as cetaceans and pinnipeds.

The Caspian Sea is at its South Caspian Basin, like the Black Sea, a remnant of the ancient Paratethys Sea. Its seafloor is, therefore, a standard oceanic basalt and not a continental granite body. It is estimated to be about 30 million years old, and became landlocked in the Late Miocene, about 5.5 million years ago, due to tectonic uplift and a fall in sea level. The Caspian Sea was a comparatively small endorheic lake during the Pliocene, but its surface area increased fivefold around the time of the Pliocene-Pleistocene transition. During warm and dry climatic periods, the landlocked sea almost dried up, depositing evaporitic sediments like halite that were covered by wind-blown deposits and were sealed off as an evaporite sink when cool, wet climates refilled the basin. (Comparable evaporite beds underlie the Mediterranean.) Due to the current inflow of fresh water in the north, the Caspian Sea water is almost fresh in its northern portions, getting more brackish toward the south. It is most saline on the Iranian shore, where the catchment basin contributes little flow. Currently, the mean salinity of the Caspian is one third that of Earth's oceans. The Garabogazköl lagoon, which dried up when water flow from the main body of the Caspian was blocked in the 1980s but has since been restored, routinely exceeds oceanic salinity by a factor of 10.

=== Geography ===
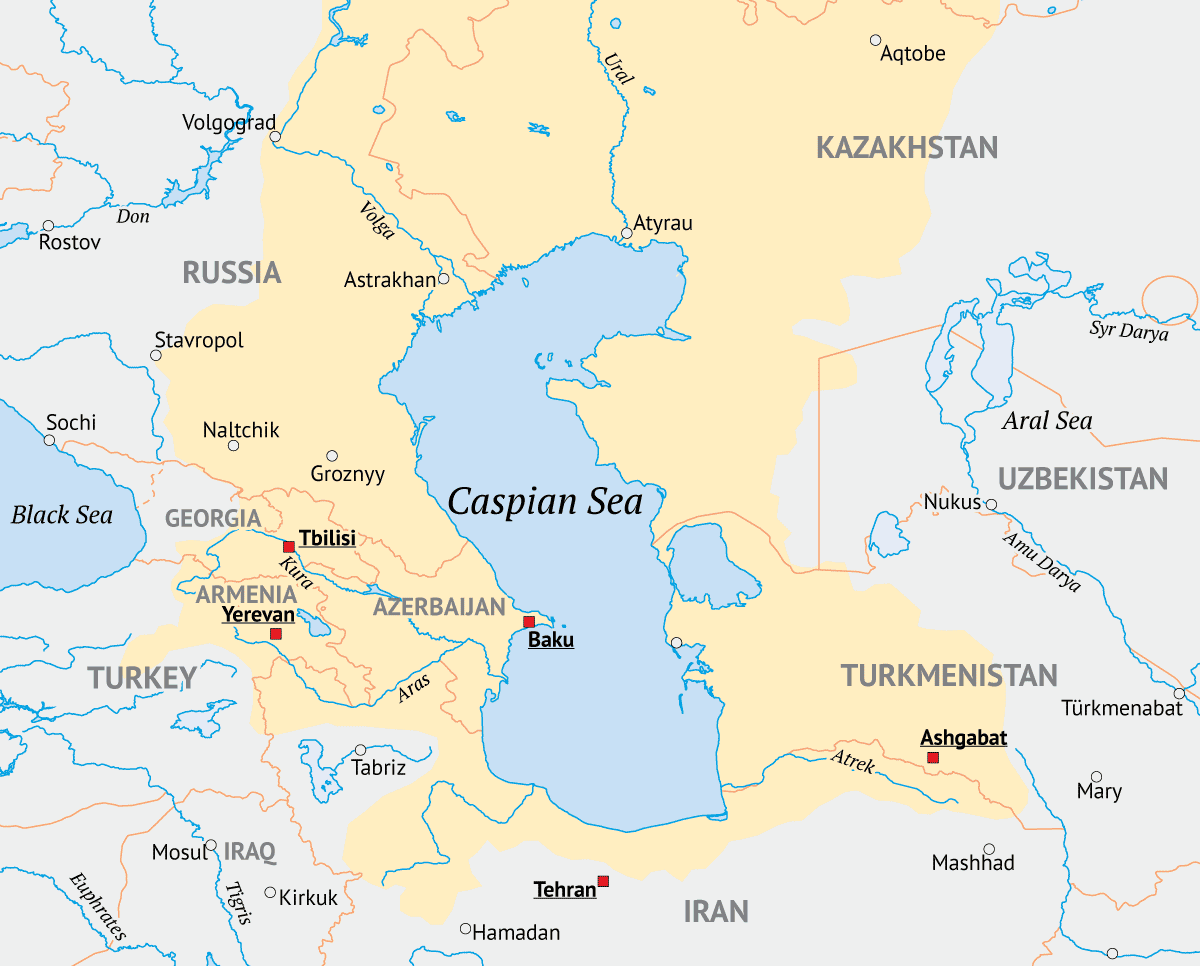
Area around the Caspian Sea. Yellow area indicates the (approximate) drainage area.

The Caspian Sea is the largest inland body of water in the world by area and accounts for 40–44% of the total lake waters of the world, and covers an area larger than Germany. The coastlines of the Caspian are shared by Azerbaijan, Iran, Kazakhstan, Russia, and Turkmenistan. The Caspian is divided into three distinct physical regions: the Northern, Middle, and Southern Caspian. The Northern–Middle boundary is the Mangyshlak Threshold, which runs through Chechen Island and Cape Tiub-Karagan. The Middle–Southern boundary is the Apsheron Threshold, a sill of tectonic origin between the Eurasian continent and an oceanic remnant, that runs through Chilov Island and Cape Kuuli. The Garabogazköl Bay is the saline eastern inlet of the Caspian, which is part of Turkmenistan and at times has been a lake in its own right due to the isthmus that cuts it off from the Caspian.

Differences between the three regions are dramatic. The Northern Caspian only includes the Caspian shelf, and is very shallow; it accounts for less than 1% of the total water volume with an average depth of only 5–6 m (16–20 ft). The sea noticeably drops off towards the Middle Caspian, where the average depth is 190 m (620 ft). The Southern Caspian is the deepest, with oceanic depths of over 1,000 m (3,300 ft), greatly exceeding the depth of other regional seas, such as the Persian Gulf. The Middle and Southern Caspian account for 33% and 66% of the total water volume, respectively. The northern portion of the Caspian Sea typically freezes in the winter, and in the coldest winters ice forms in the south as well.

Over 130 rivers provide inflow to the Caspian, the Volga River being the largest. A second affluent, the Ural River, flows in from the north, and the Kura River from the west. In the past, the Amu Darya (Oxus) of Central Asia in the east often changed course to empty into the Caspian through a now-desiccated riverbed called the Uzboy River, as did the Syr Darya farther north. The Caspian has several small islands, primarily located in the north with a collective land area of roughly 2,000 km^{2} (770 mi^{2}). Adjacent to the North Caspian is the Caspian Depression, a low-lying region 27 m (89 ft) below sea level. The Central Asian steppes stretch across the northeast coast, while the Caucasus Mountains hug the western shore. The biomes to both the north and east are characterized by cold, continental deserts. Conversely, the climate to the southwest and south are generally warm with uneven elevation due to a mix of highlands and mountain ranges; the drastic changes in climate alongside the Caspian have led to a great deal of biodiversity in the region.

The Caspian Sea has numerous islands near the coasts, but none in the deeper parts of the sea. Ogurja Ada is the largest island. The island is 37 km (23 mi) long, with Goitered gazelles roaming freely on it. In the North Caspian, the majority of the islands are small and uninhabited, like the Tyuleniy Archipelago, an Important Bird Area (IBA).

=== Climate ===
The climate of the Caspian Sea is variable, with the cold desert climate (BWk), cold semi-arid climate (BSk), and humid continental climate (Dsa, Dfa) being present in the northern portions of the Caspian Sea, while the Mediterranean climate (Csa) and humid subtropical climate (Cfa) are present in the southern portions of the Caspian Sea.

=== Hydrology ===
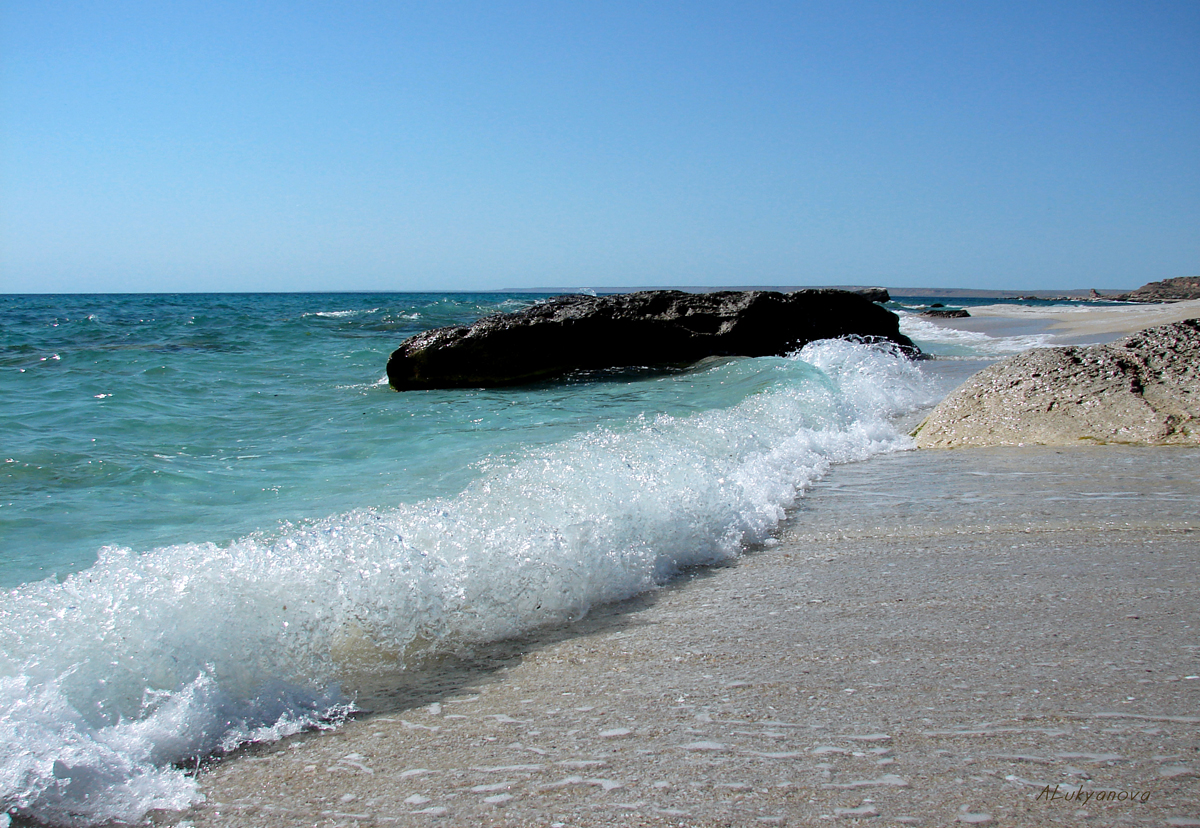
Caspian Sea near Aktau, Mangystau Region, Kazakhstan

The Caspian has characteristics common to both seas and lakes. It is often listed as the world's largest lake, although it is not freshwater: its 1.2% salinity classes it with brackish water bodies.

It contains about 3.5 times as much water, by volume, as all five of North America's Great Lakes combined. The Volga River (about 80% of the inflow) and the Ural River discharge into the Caspian Sea, but it has no natural outflow other than by evaporation. Thus the Caspian ecosystem is a closed basin, with its own sea level history that is independent of the eustatic level of the world's oceans.

The sea level of the Caspian has fallen and risen, often rapidly, many times over the centuries. Some Russian historians, such as Lev Gumilev, claim that the rising of the Caspian in the 10th century caused the coastal towns of Khazaria to flood, resulting in the Khazars losing approximately two-thirds of their territory.

Over the centuries, Caspian Sea levels have changed in synchrony with the estimated discharge of the Volga, which in turn depends on rainfall levels in its vast catchment basin. Precipitation is related to variations in the amount of North Atlantic depressions that reach the interior, and they in turn are affected by cycles of the North Atlantic oscillation. Thus levels in the Caspian Sea relate to atmospheric conditions in the North Atlantic, thousands of kilometres to the northwest.

The last short-term sea-level cycle started with a sea-level fall of 3 m (10 ft) from 1929 to 1977, followed by a rise of 3 m (10 ft) from 1977 until 1995. Since then smaller oscillations have taken place.

The current projection is that climate change will cause water levels to decline by up to 21 m by 2100.

=== Environmental degradation ===
The Volga River, the longest river in Europe, drains 20% of the European land area and is the source of 80% of the Caspian's inflow. Heavy development in its lower reaches has caused numerous unregulated releases of chemical and biological pollutants. The UN Environment Programme warns that the Caspian "suffers from an enormous burden of pollution from oil extraction and refining, offshore oil fields, radioactive wastes from nuclear power plants and huge volumes of untreated sewage and industrial waste introduced mainly by the Volga River".

The magnitude of fossil fuel extraction and transport activity in the Caspian also poses a risk to the environment. The island of Vulf off Baku, for example, has suffered ecological damage as a result of the petrochemical industry; this has significantly decreased the number of species of marine birds in the area. Existing and planned oil and gas pipelines under the sea further increase the potential threat to the environment.

The high concentration of mud volcanoes under the Caspian Sea was thought to be the cause of a fire that broke out 75 kilometers from Baku on 5 July 2021. The State oil company of Azerbaijan SOCAR said preliminary information indicated it was a mud volcano which spewed both mud and flammable gas.

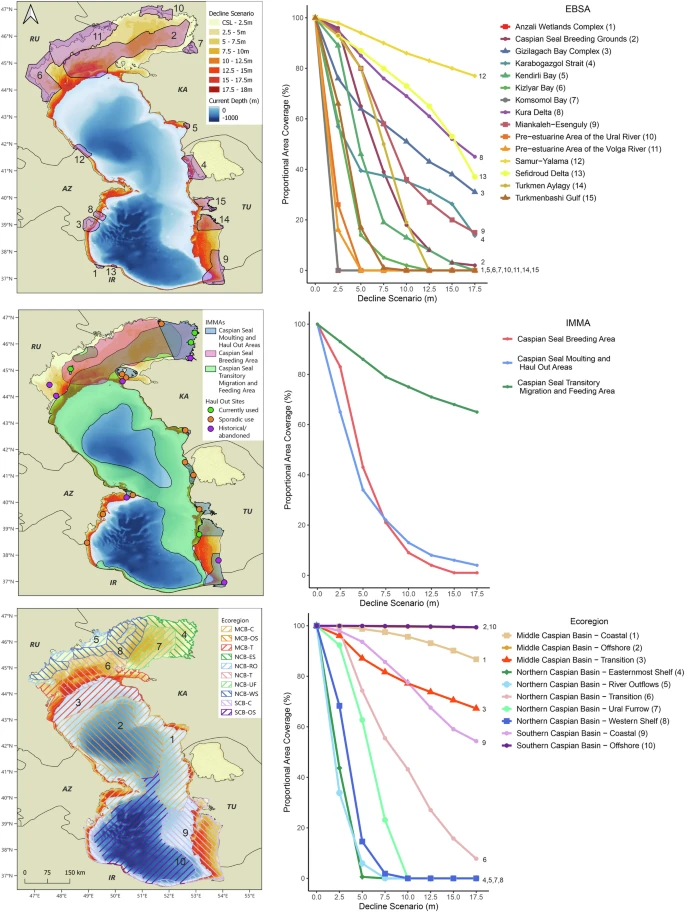
Area reductions arising from sea level decline scenarios for ecologically important areas in the Caspian Sea

It is calculated that during the 21st century, the water level of the Caspian Sea will decrease by 9–18 m (30–60 ft) due to the acceleration of evaporation due to global warming and the process of desertification, causing an ecocide.

Under medium to high emission scenarios, a decline towards the high end, of 18 m (60 ft), could mean an area of up to 143,000 km^{2} (55,000 sq mi) converting to land, a 37% reduction to current water area. Under such a scenario all ecologically significant areas of the Caspian Sea would experience a large reduction in sea level.

On 23 October 2021, Kazakhstan President Kassym-Jomart Tokayev signed the Protocol for the Protection of the Caspian Sea against Pollution from Land-based Sources in order to ensure better protection for the biodiversity of the Caspian Sea.

In July 2025, the Caspian Sea reached its lowest recorded level, falling lower than 29 m (95 ft) below sea level.

== Flora and fauna ==
=== Flora ===
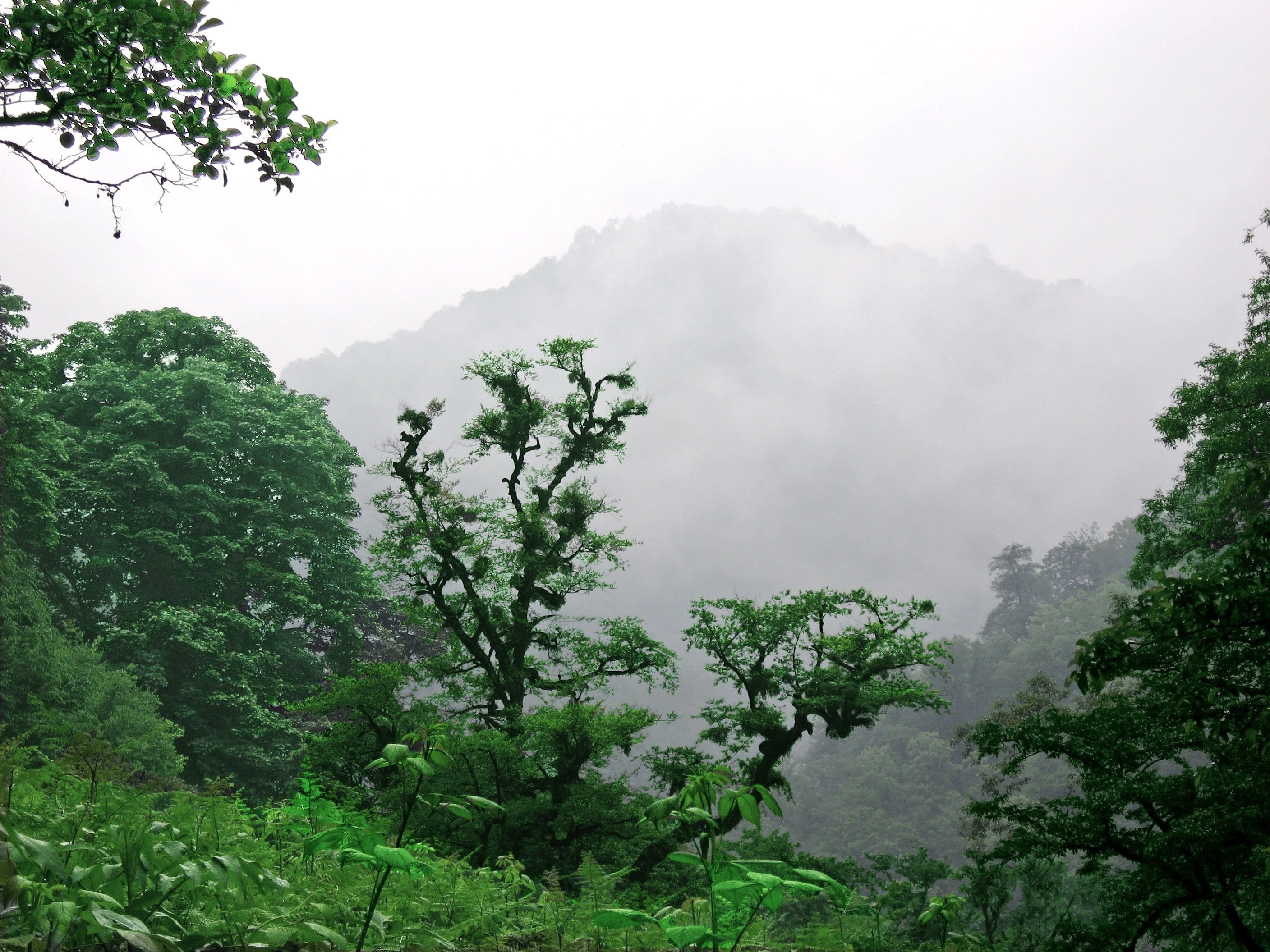
Iran's northern Caspian Hyrcanian mixed forests are maintained by moisture captured from the Caspian Sea by the Alborz Mountain Range.

The rising level of the Caspian Sea between 1995 and 1996 reduced the number of habitats for rare species of aquatic vegetation. This has been attributed to a general lack of seeding material in newly formed coastal lagoons and water bodies.

Many rare and endemic plant species of Russia are associated with the tidal areas of the Volga Delta and riparian forests of the Samur River delta. The shoreline is also a unique refuge for plants adapted to the loose sands of the Central Asian Deserts. The principal limiting factors to successful establishment of plant species are hydrological imbalances within the surrounding deltas, water pollution, and various land reclamation activities. The water level change within the Caspian Sea is an indirect reason for which plants may not get established.

These affect aquatic plants of the Volga Delta, such as Aldrovanda vesiculosa and the native Nelumbo caspica. Over a thousand plant species are found in the Samur River delta, including the unique temperate broadleaf forest and tropical liana forests that date back to the Tertiary period. In 2018, the Samursky National Park was created, protecting much of the Samur River delta.

Since 2019 UNESCO has admitted the lush Hyrcanian forests of Mazandaran, Iran as World Heritage Site under category (ix).

=== Fauna ===
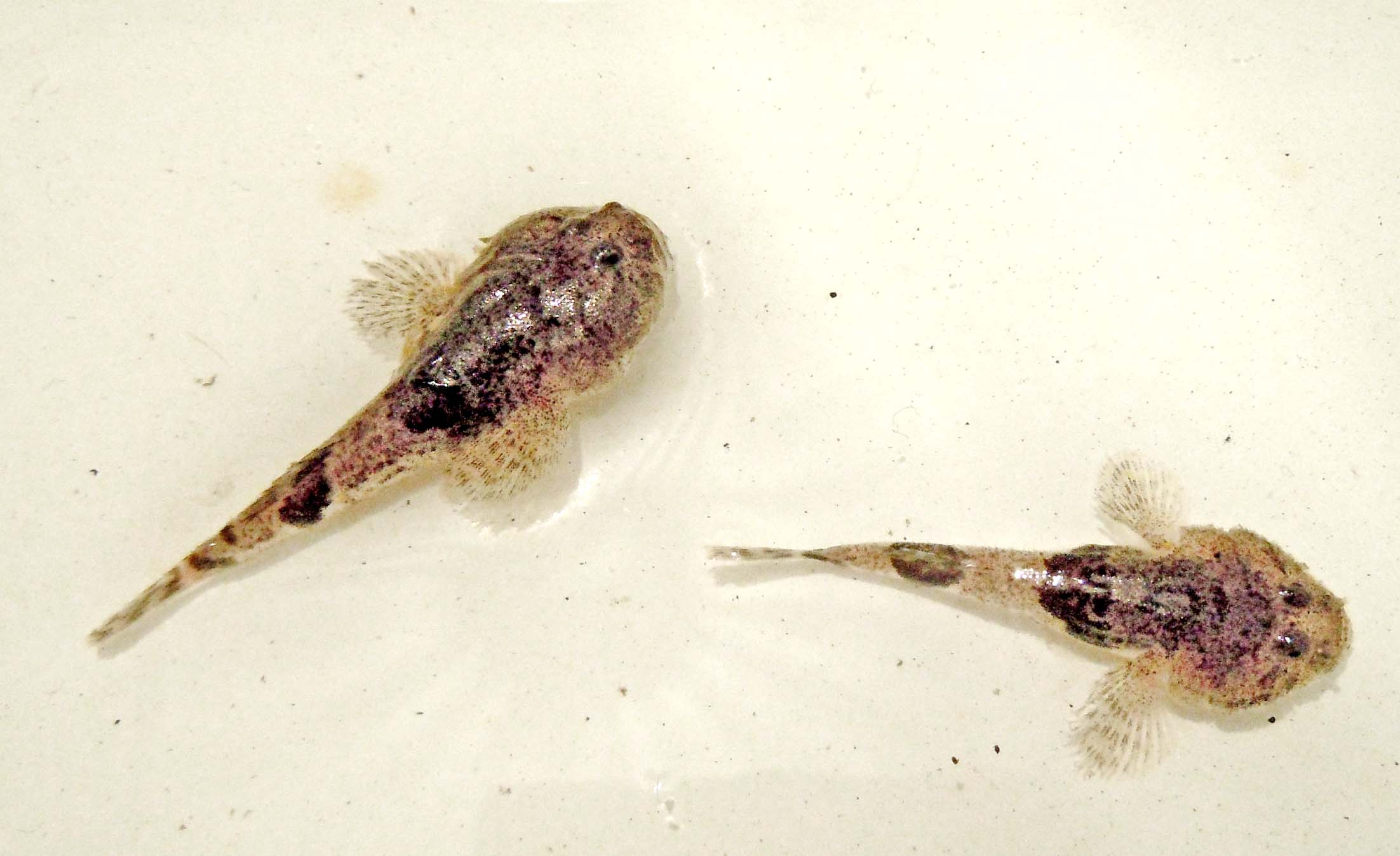
Most tadpole gobies (Benthophilus) are found only in the Caspian Sea basin.

The Caspian turtle (Mauremys caspica), although found in neighboring areas, is a wholly freshwater species. The zebra mussel is native to the Caspian and Black Sea basins, but has become an invasive species elsewhere, when introduced. The area has given its name to several species, including the Caspian gull and the Caspian tern. The Caspian seal (Pusa caspica) is the only aquatic mammal endemic to the Caspian Sea, being one of very few seal species that live in inland waters, but it is different from those inhabiting freshwaters due to the hydrological environment of the sea. A century ago the Caspian was home to more than one million seals. Today, fewer than 10% remain.

Archeological studies of Gobustan Rock Art have identified what may be oceanic species including cetaceans from baleen whales to dolphins, and auks most likely Brunnich's Guillemot, although the rock art on Kichikdash Mountain which is assumed to depict either a beaked whale or a dolphin, it may represent the famous beluga sturgeon instead due to its size (430 cm in length). These petroglyphs may suggest potential presences of oceanic faunas in the Caspian Sea presumably until the Quaternary or even the last glacial period or antiquity due to historic marine inflow between the current Caspian Sea and either the Arctic Ocean or North Sea, or the Black Sea. This is supported by the existences of current endemic, oceanic species such as lagoon cockles which was genetically identified to originate in the Caspian and Black Seas regions.

The sea's basin (including associated waters such as rivers) has 160 native species and subspecies of fish in more than 60 genera. About 62% of the species and subspecies are endemic, as are 4–6 genera (depending on taxonomic treatment). The lake proper has 115 natives, including 73 endemics (63.5%). Among the more than 50 genera in the lake proper, 3–4 are endemic: Anatirostrum, Caspiomyzon, Chasar (often included in Ponticola) and Hyrcanogobius. By far the most numerous families in the lake proper are gobies (35 species and subspecies), cyprinids (32) and clupeids (22). Two particularly rich genera are Alosa with 18 endemic species/subspecies and Benthophilus with 16 endemic species. Other examples of endemics are four species of Clupeonella, Gobio volgensis, two Rutilus, three Sabanejewia, Stenodus leucichthys, two Salmo, two Mesogobius and three Neogobius. Most non-endemic natives are either shared with the Black Sea basin or widespread Palearctic species such as crucian carp, Prussian carp, common carp, common bream, common bleak, asp, white bream, sunbleak, common dace, common roach, common rudd, European chub, sichel, tench, European weatherfish, wels catfish, northern pike, burbot, European perch and zander. Almost 30 non-indigenous, introduced fish species have been reported from the Caspian Sea, but only a few have become established.

Six sturgeon species, the Russian, bastard, Persian, sterlet, starry and beluga, are native to the Caspian Sea. The last of these is arguably the largest freshwater fish in the world. The sturgeon yield roe (eggs) that are processed into caviar. Overfishing has depleted a number of the historic fisheries. In recent years, overfishing has threatened the sturgeon population to the point that environmentalists advocate banning sturgeon fishing completely until the population recovers. The high price of sturgeon caviar—more than 1,500 Azerbaijani manats (US$880 as of April 2019) per kilo—allows fishermen to afford bribes to ensure the authorities look the other way, making regulations in many locations ineffective. Caviar harvesting further endangers the fish stocks, since it targets reproductive females.

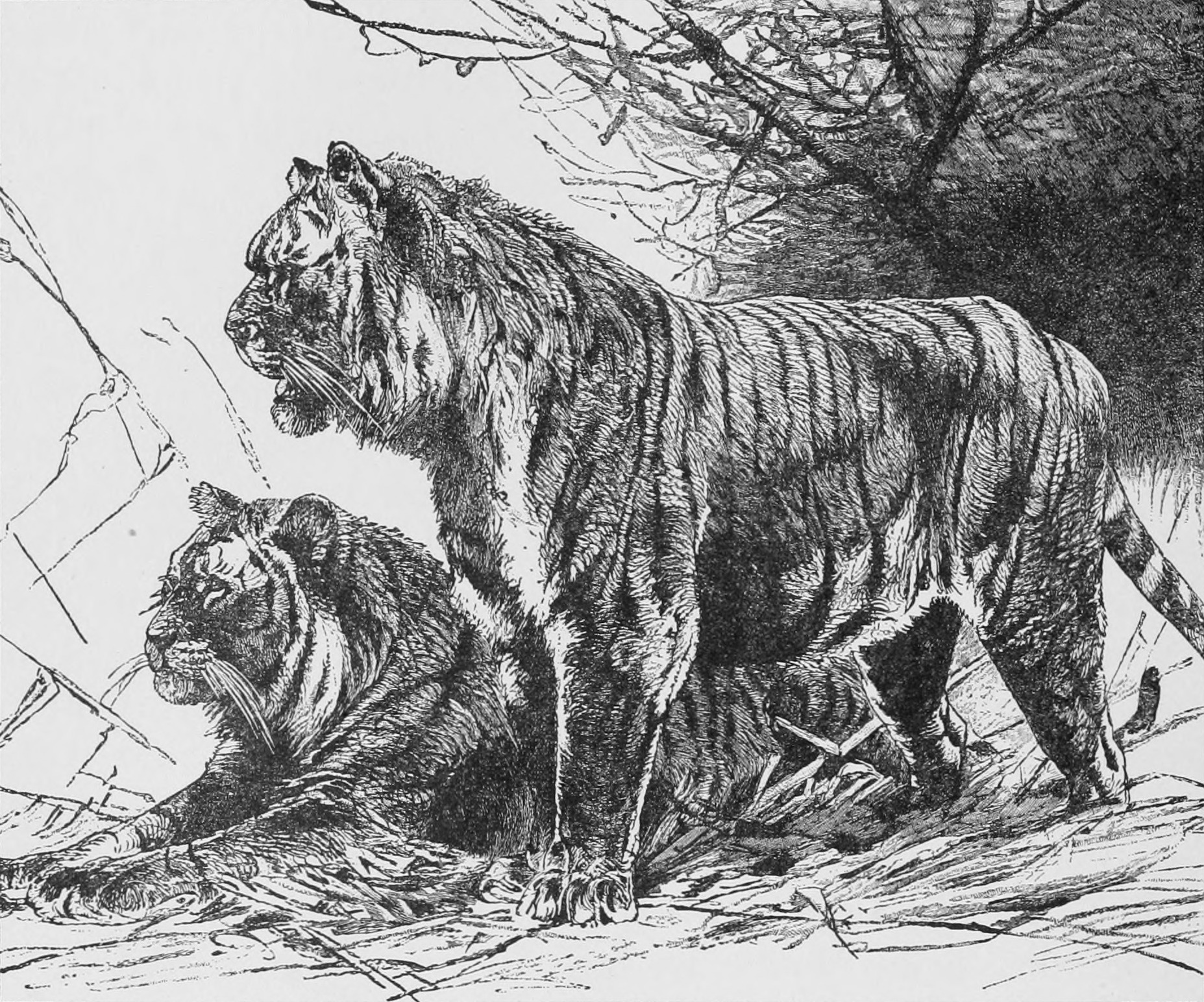
Illustration of two Caspian tigers, extinct in the region since the 1970s

Reptiles native to the region include the spur-thighed tortoise (Testudo graeca buxtoni) and Horsfield's tortoise.

- The Asiatic cheetah used to occur in the Trans-Caucasus and Central Asia, but is today restricted to Iran.
- The Asiatic lion used to occur in the Trans-Caucasus, Iran, and possibly the southern part of Turkestan.
- The Caspian tiger used to occur in northern Iran, the Caucasus and Central Asia.
- The endangered Persian leopard is found in Iran, the Caucasus and Central Asia.

== History ==
=== Geology ===
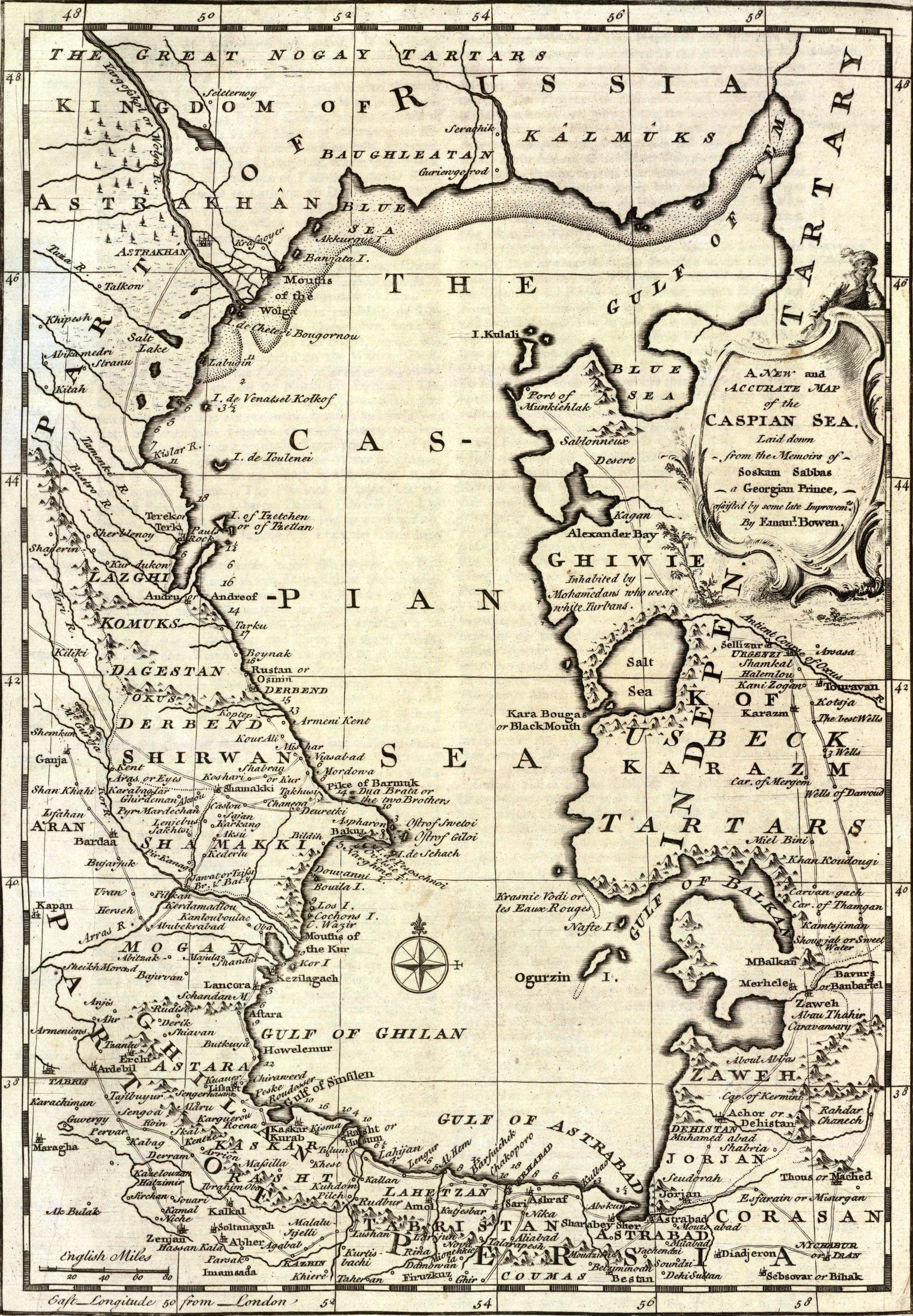
A New and Accurate Map of the Caspian Sea by the Soskam Sabbus & Emanuel Bowen, 1747

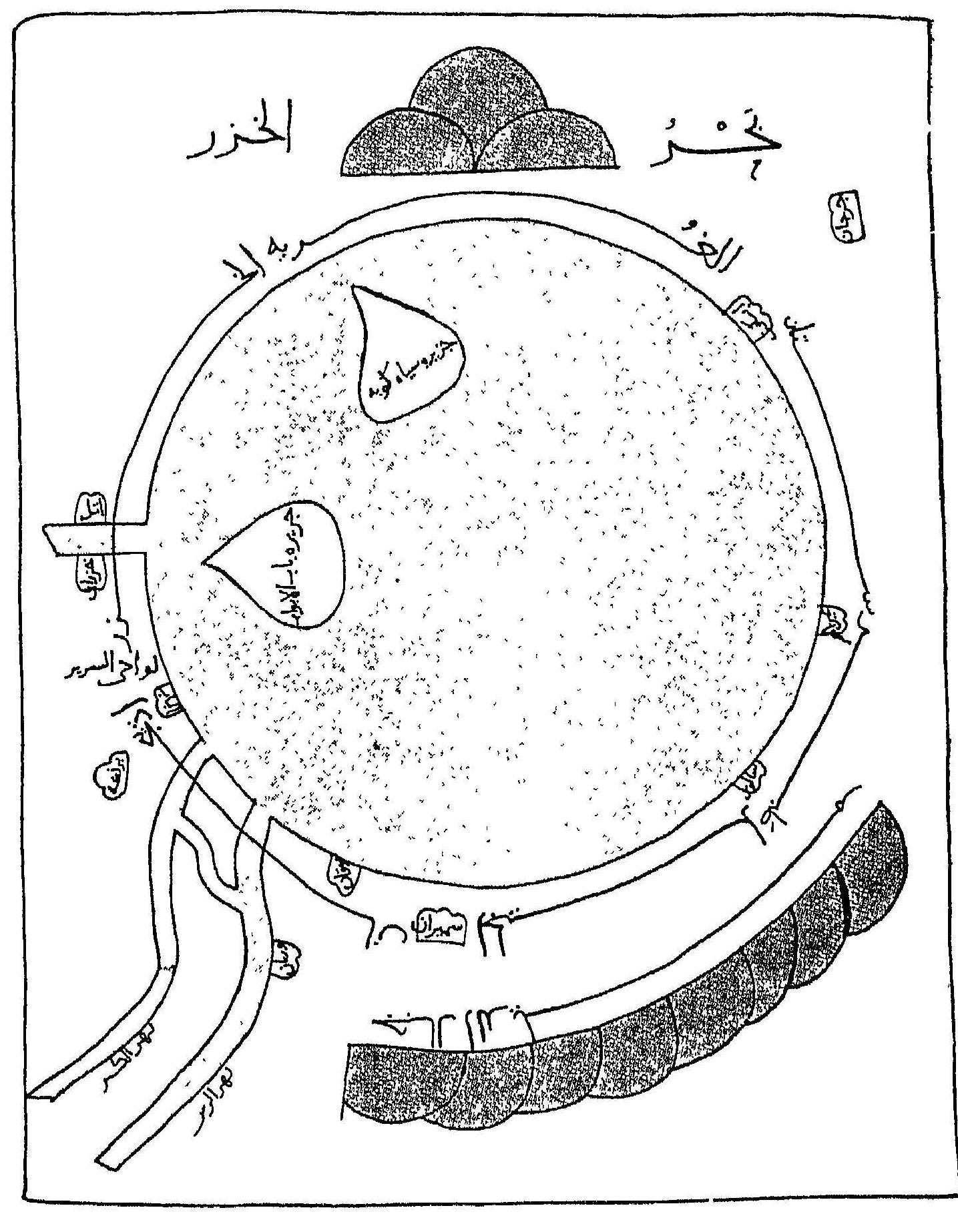
Caspian Sea (Bahr ul-Khazar), 10th century map by Ibn Hawqal

The main geologic history locally had two stages. The first is the Miocene, determined by tectonic events that correlate with the closing of the Tethys Sea. The second is the Pleistocene noted for its glaciation cycles and the full run of the present Volga. During the first stage, the Tethys Sea had evolved into the Sarmatian Lake, that was created from the modern Black Sea and south Caspian, when the collision of the Arabian peninsula with West Asia pushed up the Kopet Dag and Caucasus Mountains, making lasting south and west limits to the basin. This orogenic movement was continuous, while the Caspian was regularly disconnected from the Black Sea. In the late Pontian stage, a mountain arch rose across the south basin and divided it into the Khachmaz and Lankaran Lakes (or early Balaxani). The period of restriction to the south basin was reversed during the Akchagylian—the lake became more than three times its size today and took again the first of a series of contacts with the Black Sea and Aral Sea. A recession of Lake Akchagyl completed stage one.

=== Early settlement nearby ===
The 17th-century Cossack rebel and pirate Stenka Razin, on a raid in the Caspian (Vasily Surikov, 1906)

The earliest hominid remains found around the Caspian Sea are from Dmanisi dating back to around 1.8 million years ago and yielded a number of skeletal remains of Homo erectus or Homo ergaster. More later evidence for human occupation of the region came from a number of caves in Georgia and Azerbaijan such as Kudaro and Azykh Caves. There is evidence for Lower Palaeolithic human occupation south of the Caspian from western Alburz. These are Ganj Par and Darband Cave sites.

Neanderthal remains also have been discovered at a cave in Georgia. Discoveries in the Hotu cave and the adjacent Kamarband cave, near the town of Behshahr, Mazandaran south of the Caspian in Iran, suggest human habitation of the area as early as 11,000 years ago. Ancient Greeks focused on the civilization on the south shore—they call it the (H)yr(c/k)anian Sea (Ancient Greek: Υρκανία θάλαττα, with sources noting the latter word was evolving then to today's Thelessa: late Ancient Greek: θάλασσα).

Hafiz-i Abru, a fourteenth century Timurid Empire geographer, recorded that the destruction of the Oxus river dam and irrigation works diverted the river flow towards the Caspian Sea, which caused the Aral sea to nearly disappear.

=== Fossil fuel ===
The area is rich in fossil fuels. Oil wells were being dug in the region as early as the 10th century to reach oil "for use in everyday life, both for medicinal purposes and for heating and lighting in homes". By the 16th century, Europeans were aware of the rich oil and gas deposits locally. English traders Thomas Bannister and Jeffrey Duckett described the area around Baku as "a strange thing to behold, for there issueth out of the ground a marvelous quantity of oil, which serveth all the country to burn in their houses. This oil is black and is called nefte. There is also by the town of Baku, another kind of oil which is white and very precious [i.e., petroleum]."

Today, oil and gas platforms abound along the edges of the sea.

=== Geography, geology and navigation studies ===
During the rule of Peter I the Great, Fyodor Soimonov was a pioneering explorer of the sea. He was a hydrographer who charted and greatly expanded knowledge of the sea. He drew a set of four maps and wrote Pilot of the Caspian Sea, the first lengthy report and modern maps. These were published in 1720 by the Russian Academy of Sciences.

== Cities ==
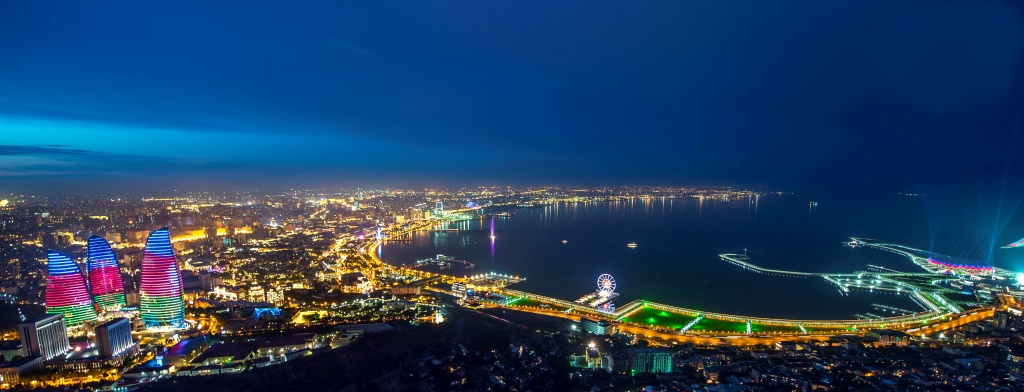
Baku, the capital of Azerbaijan, is the largest city by the Caspian Sea.

=== Ancient ===
- Hyrcania, ancient state in the north of Iran
- Sari, Mazandaran Province of Iran
- Anzali, Gilan Province of Iran
- Astara, Gilan Province of Iran
- Astarabad, Golestan Province of Iran
- Tamisheh, Golestan Province of Iran
- Atil, Khazaria
- Khazaran
- Derbent, Dagestan, Russia
- Xacitarxan, modern-day Astrakhan

=== Modern ===
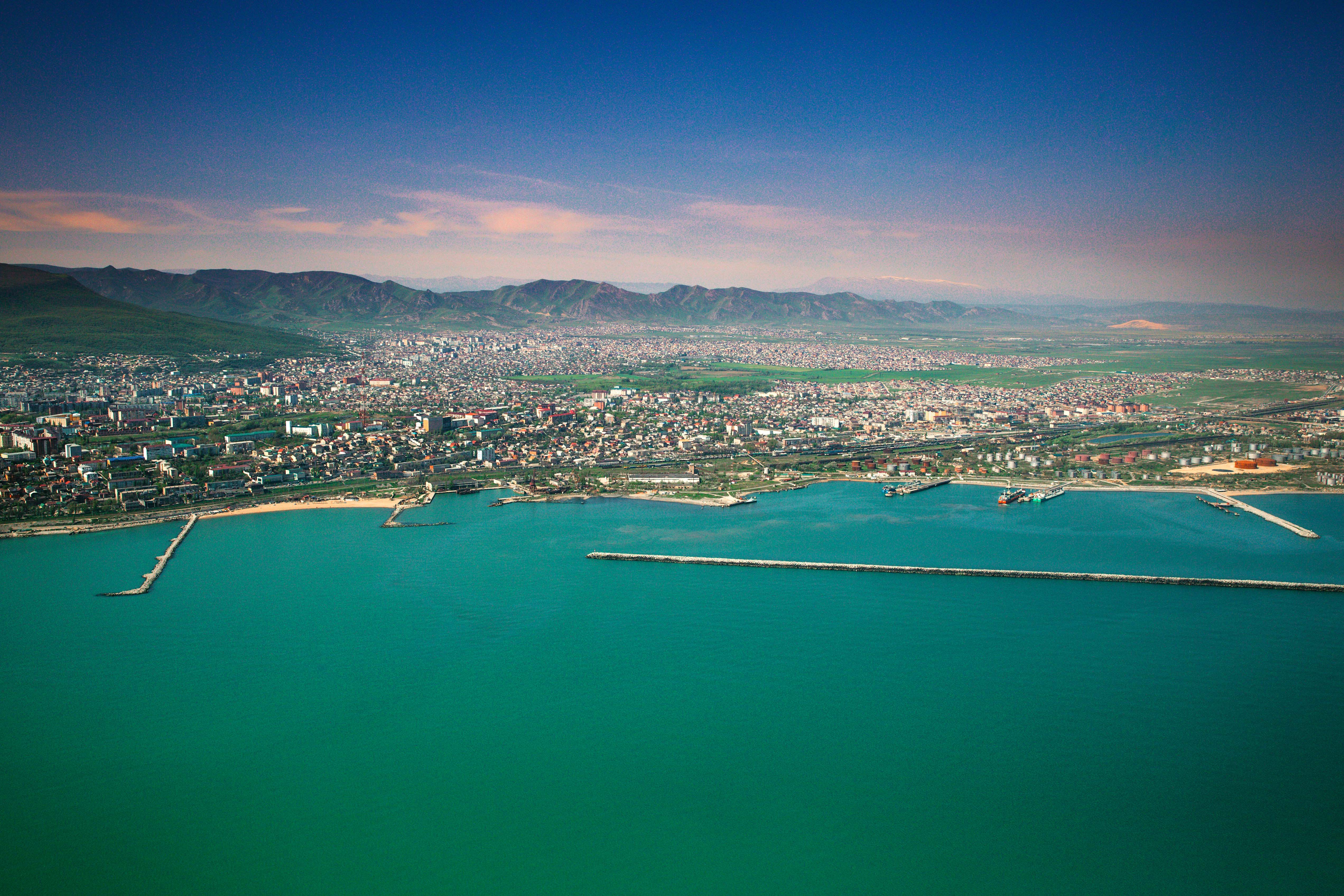
Makhachkala, the capital of the Russian republic of Dagestan, is the third-largest city on the Caspian Sea.

- Iran:
  - Ali Abad
  - Astane-ye Ashrafiye
  - Astara
  - Babolsar
  - Bandar-e Anzali
  - Bandar-e-Gaz
  - Bandar Torkaman
  - Behshahr
  - Chalus
  - Fenderesk
  - Gomishan
  - Gonbad-e Kavus
  - Gorgan
  - Juybar
  - Kordkuy
  - Lahijan
  - Langarud
  - Mahmudabad
  - Neka
  - Nowshahr
  - Nur
  - Ramsar
  - Rasht
  - Rudbar
  - Rudsar
  - Sari
  - Sorkhrud
  - Talesh
  - Tonekabon
- Azerbaijan:
  - Astara
  - Baku
  - Gobustan
  - Khudat
  - Khachmaz
  - Lankaran
  - Masallı
  - Nabran
  - Neftchala
  - Shabran
  - Siyazan
  - Oil Rocks
  - Sumqayit
- Kazakhstan:
  - Atyrau
  - Aktau
- Russia:
  - Astrakhan
  - Dagestanskiye Ogni
  - Derbent
  - Izberbash
  - Kaspiysk
  - Makhachkala
- Turkmenistan:
  - Türkmenbaşy (formerly Krasnovodsk)
  - Hazar (formerly Çeleken)
  - Esenguly
  - Garabogaz (formerly Bekdaş)

== Economy ==
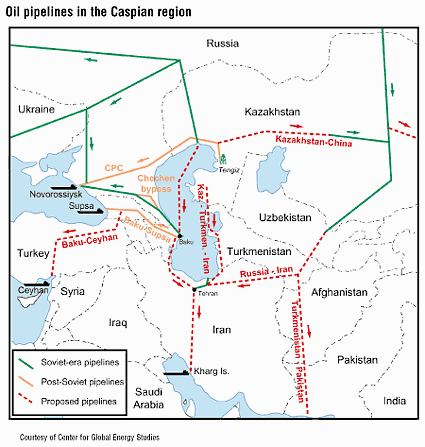
Oil pipelines in the Caspian region, September 2002

Countries in the Caspian region, particularly Azerbaijan, Kazakhstan and Turkmenistan, have high-value natural-resource-based economies, where the oil and gas compose more than 10 percent of their GDP and 40 percent of their exports. All the Caspian region economies are highly dependent on this type of mineral wealth. The world energy markets were influenced by Azerbaijan and Kazakhstan, as they became strategically crucial in this sphere, thus attracting the largest share of foreign direct investment (FDI).

All of the countries are rich in solar energy and harnessing potential, with the highest rainfall much less than the mountains of central Europe in the mountains of the west, which are also rich in hydroelectricity sources.

Iran has high fossil fuel energy potential. It has reserves of 137.5 billion barrels of crude oil, the fourth largest in the world, producing around four million barrels a day. Iran has an estimated 988.4 trillion cubic feet of natural gas, around 16 percent of world reserves, thus key to current paradigms in global energy security.

Russia's economy ranks as the twelfth largest by nominal GDP and sixth largest by purchasing power parity in 2015. Russia's extensive mineral and energy resources are the largest such reserves in the world, making it the second leading producer of oil and natural gas globally.

Caspian littoral states join efforts to develop infrastructure, tourism and trade in the region. The first Caspian Economic Forum was convened on 12 August 2019, in Turkmenistan and brought together representatives of Kazakhstan, Russia, Azerbaijan, Iran and that state. It hosted several meetings of their ministers of economy and transport.

The Caspian countries develop robust cooperation in the tech and digital field as part of the Caspian Digital Hub. The project helps expand data transmission capabilities in Kazakhstan as well as data transit capabilities between Asia and Europe. The project generated interest from investors from all over the world, including the UK.

=== Oil and gas ===
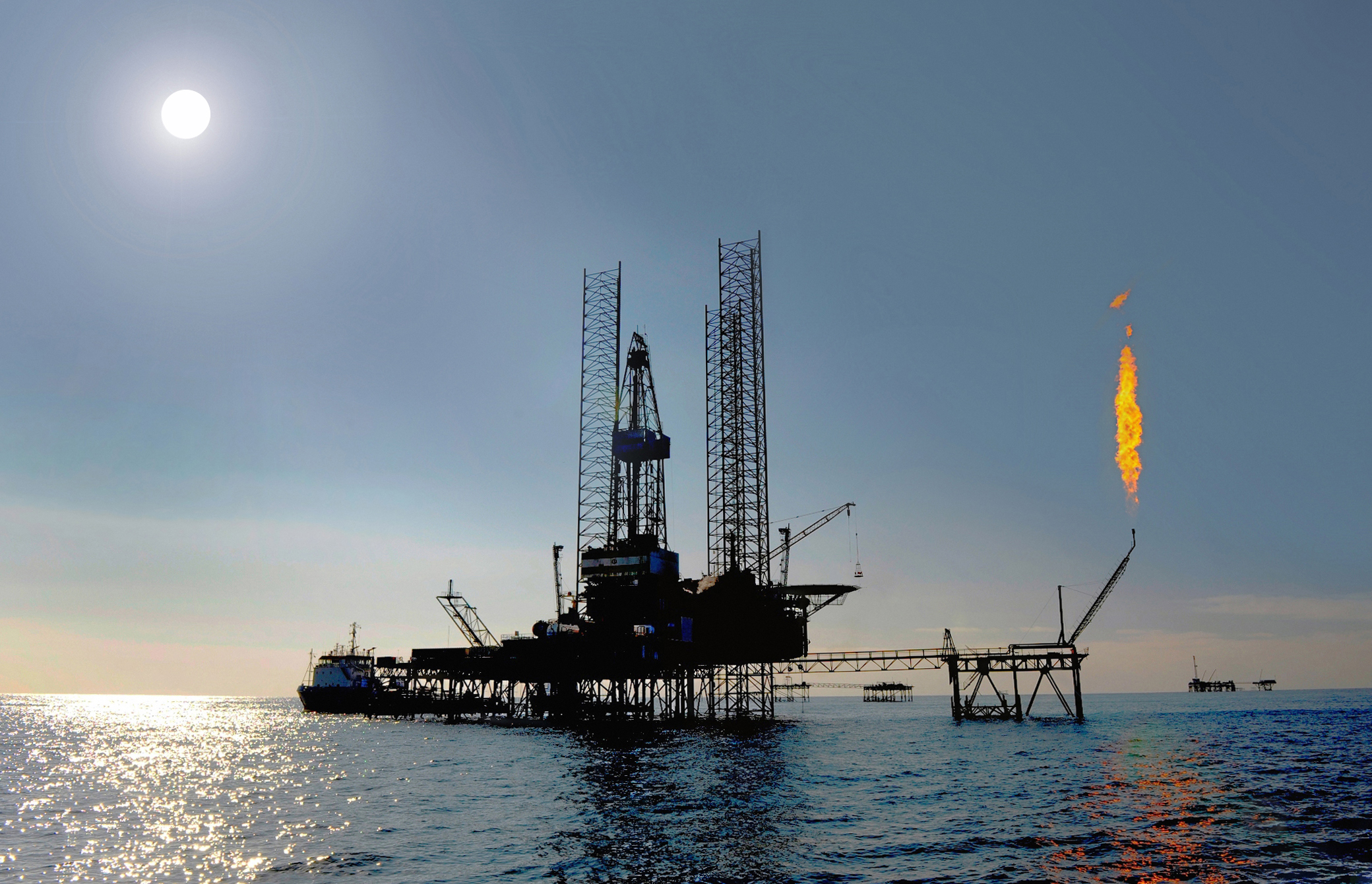
Drilling platform "Iran Khazar" in use at a Dragon Oil production platform in the Cheleken field (Turkmenistan)

The Caspian Sea region presently is a significant, but not major, supplier of crude oil to world markets, based upon estimates by BP Amoco and the U.S. Energy Information Administration, U.S. Department of Energy. The region output about 1.4–1.5 million barrels per day plus natural gas liquids in 2001, 1.9% of total world output. More than a dozen countries output more than this top figure. Caspian region production has been higher, but waned during and after the collapse of the Soviet Union. Kazakhstan accounts for 55% and Azerbaijan for about 20% of the states' oil output.

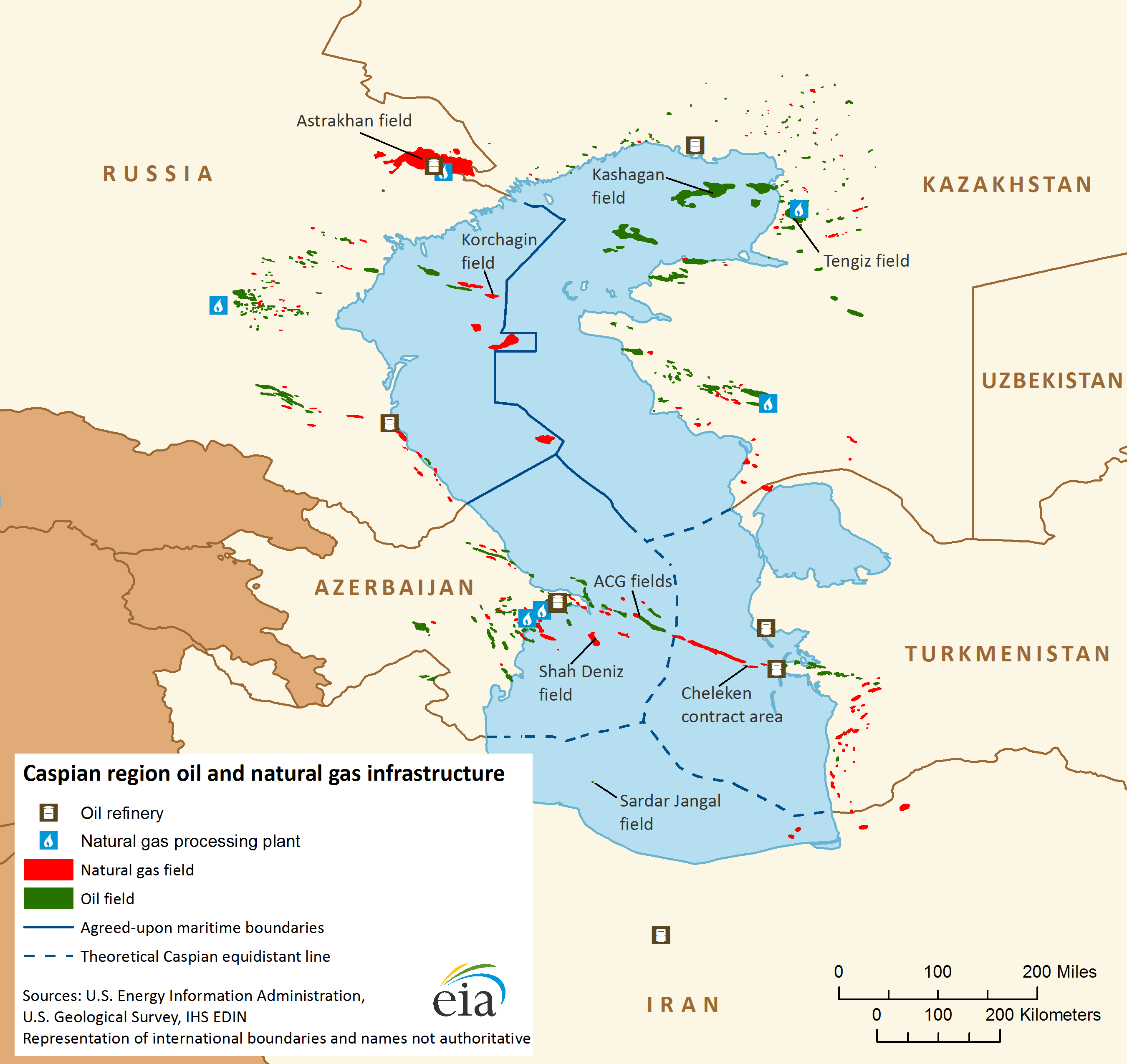
Caspian region oil and natural gas infrastructure, August 2013

The world's first offshore wells and machine-drilled wells were made in Bibi-Heybat Bay, near Baku, Azerbaijan. In 1873, exploration and development of oil began in some of the largest fields known to exist in the world at that time on the Absheron Peninsula near the villages of Balakhanli, Sabunchi, Ramana, and Bibi Heybat. Total recoverable reserves were more than 500 million tons. By 1900, Baku had more than 3,000 oil wells, 2,000 of which were producing at industrial levels. By the end of the 19th century, Baku became known as the "black gold capital", and many skilled workers and specialists flocked to the city.

By the beginning of the 20th century, Baku was the center of the international oil industry. In 1920, when the Bolsheviks captured Azerbaijan, all private property, including oil wells and factories, was confiscated. Rapidly the republic's oil industry came under the control of the Soviet Union. By 1941, Azerbaijan was producing a record 23.5 million tons of oil per year – its Baku region output was nearly 72 percent of the Soviet Union's oil.

In 1994, the "Contract of the Century" was signed, heralding extra-regional development of the Baku oil fields. The large Baku–Tbilisi–Ceyhan pipeline conveys Azeri oil to the Turkish Mediterranean port of Ceyhan and opened in 2006.

The Vladimir Filanovsky oil field in the Russian section of the body of water was discovered in 2005. It is reportedly the largest found in 25 years. It was announced in October 2016 that Lukoil would start production from it.

==== Transport ====
Baku has the main moorings of all large vessels, such as oil tankers, in Azerbaijan. It is the largest port of the Caspian Sea. The port (and tankers) have access to the oceans along the Caspian Sea–Volga–Don Canal, and the Don–Sea of Azov. A northern alternate is the Volga–Baltic (a sea which has a connection to the North Sea of the Atlantic, as the White Sea does via the White Sea-Baltic canal). Baku Sea Trade Port and Caspian Shipping Company CJSC, have a big role in the sea transportation of Azerbaijan. The Caspian Sea Shipping Company CJSC has two fleets plus shipyards. Its transport fleet has 51 vessels: 20 tankers, 13 ferries, 15 universal dry cargo vessels, 2 Ro-Ro vessels, as well as 1 technical vessel and 1 floating workshop. Its specialized fleet has 210 vessels: 20 cranes, 25 towing and supplying vehicles, 26 passenger, two pipe-laying, six fire-fighting, seven engineering-geological, two diving and 88 auxiliary vessels.

The Caspian Sea Shipping Company of Azerbaijan, which acts as a liaison in the Transport Corridor Europe-Caucasus-Asia (TRACECA), simultaneously with the transportation of cargo and passengers in the Trans-Caspian direction, also performs work to fully ensure the processes of oil and gas production at sea. In the 19th century, the sharp increase in oil production in Baku gave a huge impetus to the development of shipping in the Caspian Sea, and as a result, there was a need to create fundamentally new floating facilities for the transportation of oil and oil products.

=== Political issues ===
Many of the islands along the Azerbaijani coast retain great geopolitical and economic importance for demarcation-line oil fields relying on their national status. Bulla Island, Pirallahı Island, and Nargin, which is still used as a former Soviet base and is the largest island in the Baku bay, hold oil reserves.

The collapse of the Soviet Union allowed the market opening of the region. This led to intense investment and development by international oil companies. In 1998, Dick Cheney commented that "I can't think of a time when we've had a region emerge as suddenly to become as strategically significant as the Caspian."

A key problem to further local development is arriving at precise, agreed demarcation lines among the five littoral states. The current disputes along Azerbaijan's maritime borders with Turkmenistan and Iran could impinge future development.

Much controversy currently exists over the proposed Trans-Caspian oil and gas pipelines. These projects would allow Western markets easier access to Kazakh oil and, potentially, Uzbek and Turkmen gas as well. Russia officially opposes the project on environmental grounds. However, analysts note that the pipelines would bypass Russia completely, thereby denying the country valuable transit fees, as well as destroying its current monopoly on westward-bound hydrocarbon exports from the region. Recently, both Kazakhstan and Turkmenistan have expressed their support for the Trans-Caspian Pipeline.

Leaked U.S. diplomatic cables revealed that BP covered up a gas leak and blowout incident in September 2008 at an operating gas field in the Azeri-Chirag-Guneshi area of the Azerbaijan Caspian Sea.

== Territorial status ==
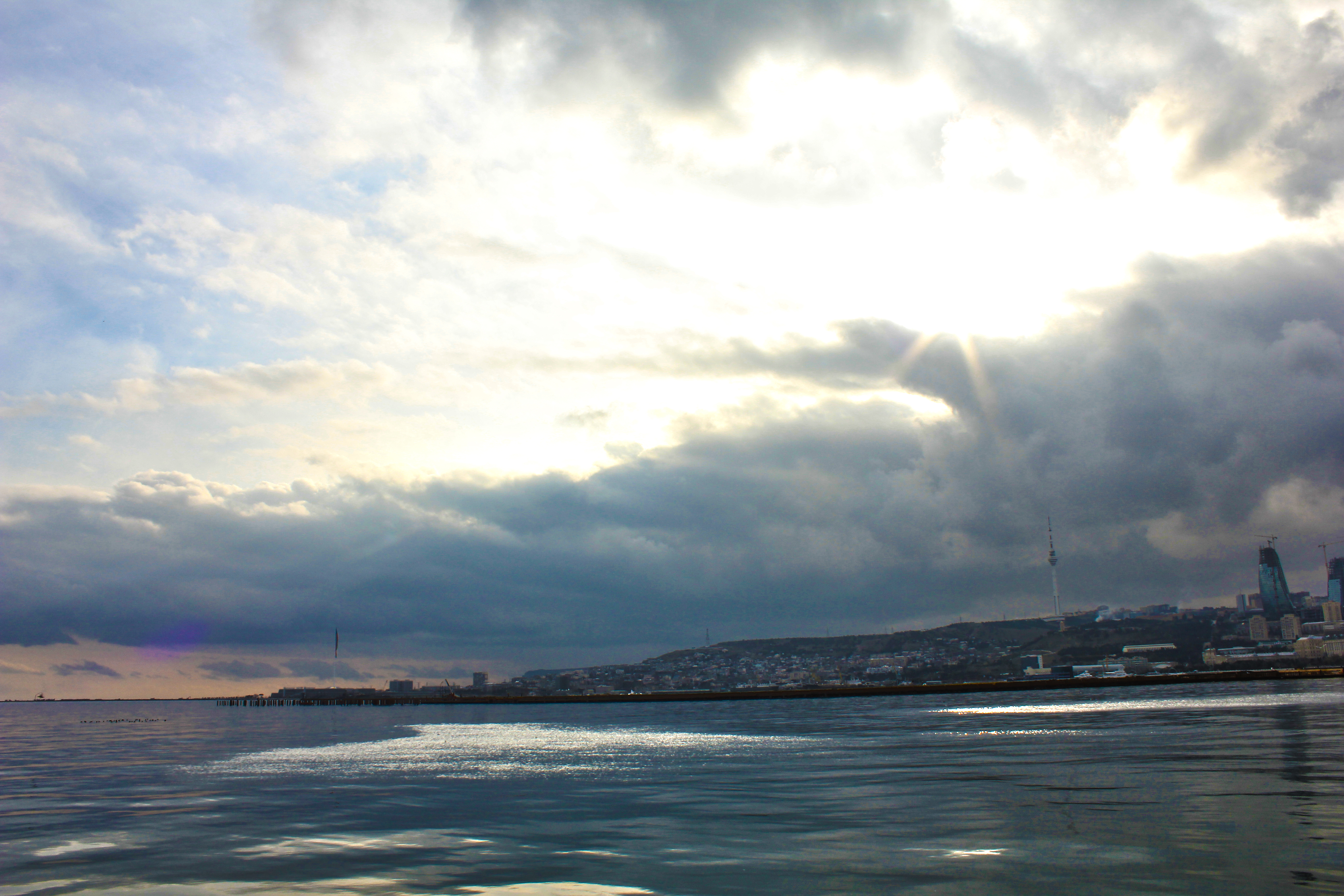
Caspian Sea, Azerbaijan

=== Coastline ===
Five states are located along about 4,800 km (3,000 mi) of the Caspian coastline. The length of the coastline of these countries:

- Kazakhstan – 1,422 km (884 mi)
- Turkmenistan – 1,035 km (643 mi)
- Iran – 728 km (452 mi)
- Azerbaijan – 813 km (505 mi)
- Russia – 747 km (464 mi)

=== Negotiations ===
A 1931 treaty between Iran and the Soviet Union stated that the sea belonged to both nations. In 2000, negotiations as to the demarcation of the sea had been going on for nearly a decade among all the states bordering it. Whether it was by law a sea, a lake, or an agreed hybrid, the decision would set the demarcation rules and was heavily debated. Access to mineral resources (oil and natural gas), access for fishing, and access to international waters (through Russia's Volga river and the canals connecting it to the Black Sea and Baltic Sea) all rest on the negotiations' outcome. Access to the Volga is key for market efficiency and economic diversity of the landlocked states of Azerbaijan, Kazakhstan, and Turkmenistan. This concerns Russia, as more traffic seeks to use its inland waterways, which can become congested at certain points. If the body of water is, by law, a sea, many precedents and international treaties oblige free access to foreign vessels. If it is a lake there are no such obligations. Resolving and improving environmental issues rests on the sea's status and borders issue.

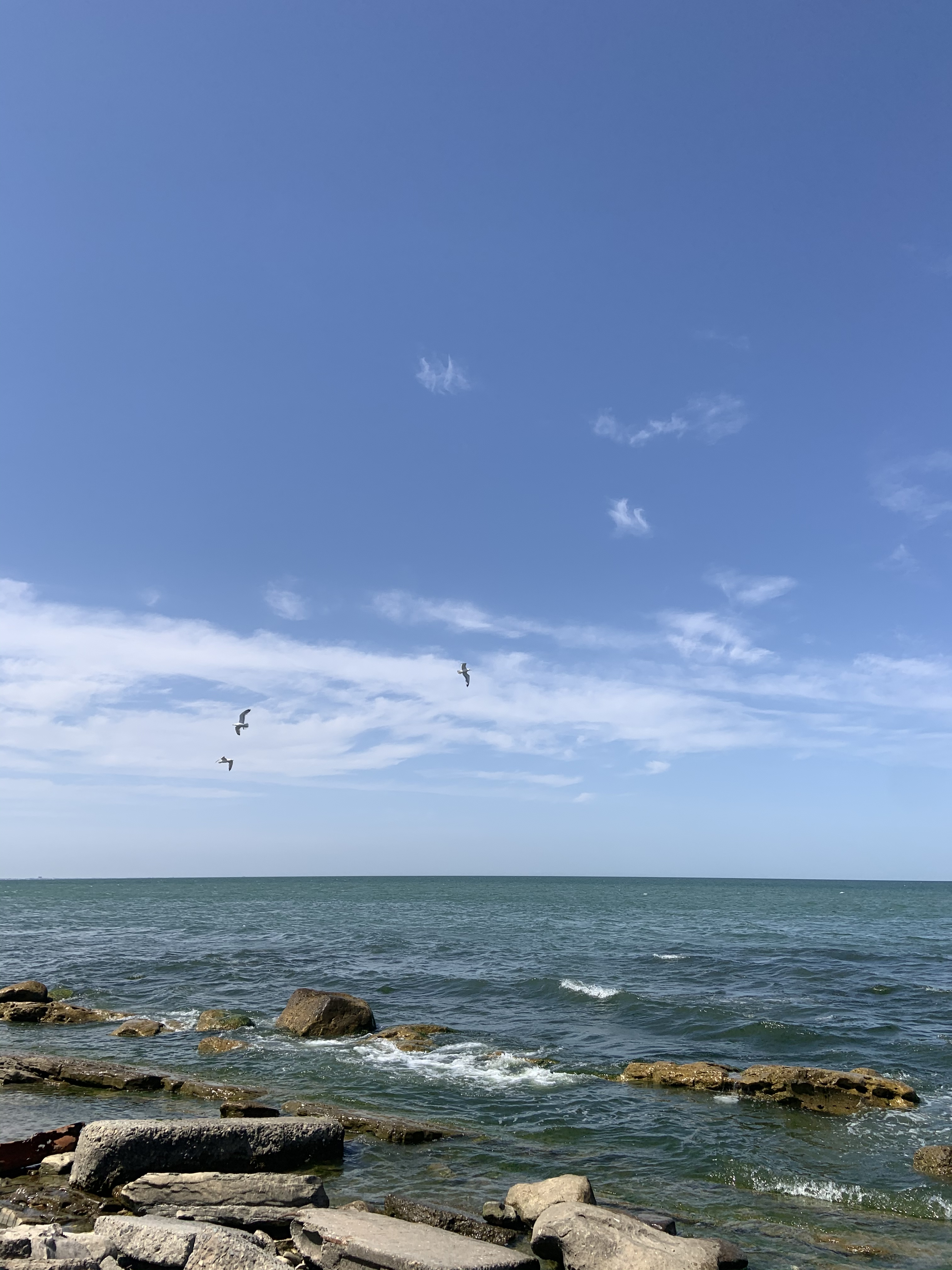
Caspian Sea shore, Dagestan

All five Caspian littoral states maintain naval forces on the sea. According to a treaty signed between Iran and the Soviet Union, the sea is technically a lake and was divided into two sectors (Iranian and Soviet), but the resources (then mainly fish) were commonly shared. The line between the two sectors was considered an international border in a common lake, like Lake Albert. The Soviet sector was sub-divided into the four littoral republics' administrative sectors.

Russia, Kazakhstan, and Azerbaijan have bilateral agreements with each other based on median lines. Because of their use by the three nations, median lines seem to be the most likely method of delineating territory in future agreements. However, Iran insists on a single, multilateral agreement among the five nations (aiming for a one-fifth share). Azerbaijan is at odds with Iran over some of the sea's oil fields. Occasionally, Iranian patrol boats have fired at vessels sent by Azerbaijan for exploration into the disputed region. There are similar tensions between Azerbaijan and Turkmenistan (the latter claims that the former has pumped more oil than agreed from a field, recognized by both parties as shared).

The Caspian littoral states' meeting in 2007 signed an accord that only allows ships bearing flags of littoral states to enter the sea.

Negotiations among the five states ebbed and flowed, from about 1990 to 2018. Progress was notable in the fourth Caspian Summit held in Astrakhan in 2014.

=== Caspian Summit ===
The Caspian Summit is a head of state-level meeting of the five littoral states. The fifth Caspian Summit took place on 12 August 2018, in the Kazakh port city of Aktau. The five leaders signed the 'Convention on the Legal Status of the Caspian Sea'.

Representatives of the Caspian littoral states held a meeting in the capital of Kazakhstan on 28 September 2018, as a follow-up to the Aktau Summit. The conference was hosted by the Kazakh Ministry of Investment and Development. The participants in the meeting agreed to host an investment forum for the Caspian region every two years.

=== Convention on the Legal Status of the Caspian Sea ===
The five littoral states build consensus on legally binding governance of the Caspian Sea through Special Working Groups of a Convention on the Legal Status of the Caspian Sea. In advance of a Caspian Summit, the 51st Special Working Group took place in Astana in May 2018 and found consensus on multiple agreements: Agreements on cooperation in the field of transport; trade and economic cooperation; prevention of incidents on the sea; combating terrorism; fighting against organized crime; and border security cooperation.

The convention grants jurisdiction over 24 km (15 mi) of territorial waters to each neighboring country, plus an additional 16 km (10 mi) of exclusive fishing rights on the surface, while the rest is international waters. The seabed, on the other hand, remains undefined, subject to bilateral agreements between countries. Thus, the Caspian Sea is legally neither fully a sea nor a lake.

While the convention addresses caviar production, oil and gas extraction, and military uses, it does not touch on environmental issues.

=== Crossborder inflow ===
UNECE recognizes several rivers that cross international borders which flow into the Caspian Sea. These are:

River	Countries
Atrek River	Iran, Turkmenistan
Kura River	Armenia, Azerbaijan, Georgia, Iran, Turkey
Ural River	Kazakhstan, Russia
Samur River	Azerbaijan, Russia
Sulak River	Georgia, Russia
Terek River	Georgia, Russia

== Transportation ==
Although the Caspian Sea is endorheic, its main tributary, the Volga, is connected by important shipping canals with the Don River (and thus the Black Sea) and with the Baltic Sea, with branch canals to Northern Dvina and to the White Sea.

Another Caspian tributary, the Kuma River, is also connected by an irrigation canal with the Don basin.

Scheduled ferry services (including train ferries) across the sea chiefly are between:

- Türkmenbaşy in Turkmenistan, (formerly Krasnovodsk) and Baku
- Aktau, Kazakhstan and Baku
- Kuryk, Kazakhstan and Baku
- Cities in Iran and Russia (chiefly for cargo.)

=== Canals ===
As an endorheic basin, the Caspian Sea basin has no natural connection with the ocean. Since the medieval period, traders reached the Caspian via a number of portages that connected the Volga and its tributaries with the Don River (which flows into the Sea of Azov) and various rivers that flow into the Baltic Sea. Primitive canals connecting the Volga Basin with the Baltic were constructed as long ago as the early 18th century. Since then, a number of canal projects have been completed.

The two modern canal systems that connect the Volga Basin, and hence the Caspian Sea, with the ocean are the Volga–Baltic Waterway and the Volga–Don Canal.

The proposed Pechora–Kama Canal was a project that was widely discussed between the 1930s and 1980s. Shipping was a secondary consideration. Its main goal was to redirect some of the water of the Pechora River (which flows into the Arctic Ocean) via the Kama River into the Volga. The goals were both irrigation and the stabilization of the water level in the Caspian, which was thought to be falling dangerously fast at the time. During 1971, some peaceful nuclear construction experiments were carried out in the region by the USSR.

In June 2007, in order to boost his oil-rich country's access to markets, Kazakhstan's President Nursultan Nazarbayev proposed a 700 km (435 mi) link between the Caspian Sea and the Black Sea. It is hoped that the "Eurasia Canal" (Manych Ship Canal) would transform landlocked Kazakhstan and other Central Asian countries into maritime states, enabling them to significantly increase trade volume. Although the canal would traverse Russian territory, it would benefit Kazakhstan through its Caspian Sea ports. The most likely route for the canal, the officials at the Committee on Water Resources at Kazakhstan's Agriculture Ministry say, would follow the Kuma–Manych Depression, where currently a chain of rivers and lakes is already connected by an irrigation canal (the Kuma–Manych Canal). Upgrading the Volga–Don Canal would be another option.

== See also ==
- Caspians
- Caspian languages
- Caspian Sea Monster
- Baku oil fields
- Epoch of Extreme Inundations
- Framework Convention for the Protection of the Marine Environment of the Caspian Sea
- Iranrud
- Shah Deniz gas field
- South Caucasus Pipeline
- Southern Gas Corridor
- Tengiz Field
- Trans-Caspian Gas Pipeline
- Wildlife of Azerbaijan
- Wildlife of Iran
- Wildlife of Kazakhstan
- Wildlife of Turkmenistan
- Wildlife of Russia
