= EEI =

EEI may refer to:

- Earth's energy imbalance, the difference between energy arriving at and leaving Earth
- Edison Electric Institute, an organisation representing parts of the U.S. electric power industry
- EEI Corporation, a Philippine construction and engineering company.
- Eindhoven Energy Institute, a department of the Eindhoven University
- Electrical and Electronics Institute of Thailand, a not-for-profit entity under the Foundation for Industrial Development
- Energy efficiency index, a rating of energy performance compared to a predefined reference used for heating and cooling such as buildings and refrigeration appliances.
- Epoch of Extreme Inundations, a hypothetical epoch during which four landforms in the Pontic–Caspian steppe were widely inundated
- Essential elements of information, any critical intelligence information required by intelligence consumers to perform their mission (a term used by US and UK ministries of defence and, until 2014, the US Army)
- Etosha Ecological Institute, an organisation managing research activity in the Etosha National Park in Namibia
