= Samursky National Park =

National park of Russia

- (Russian: Самурский)
- IUCN category II (national park)
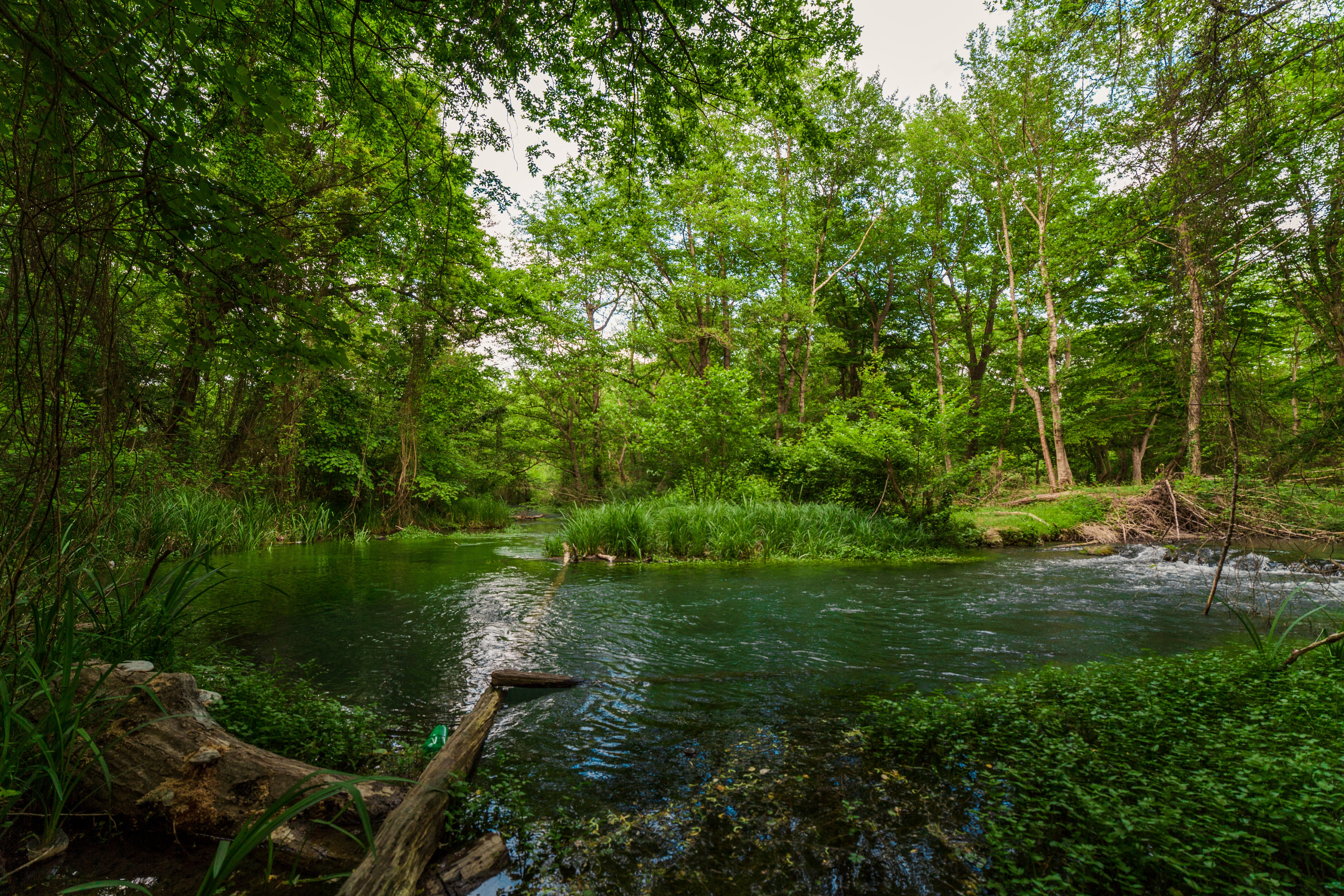
- Samur Forest, in the coastal sector of the park

- Location within Russia
- Location: Dagestan, Russia
- Nearest city: Derbent
- Coordinates: 41°52′N 48°32′E
- Area: 48,273 hectares (119,285 acres; 483 km^{2}; 186 sq mi)
- Established: December 25, 2019

Samursky National Park (Russian: Национальный парк «Самурский») is located on the west coast of the Caspian Sea, at the eastern extent of the Greater Caucasus Mountains in Dagestan, Russia. It is divided into two sectors: a coastal floodplain section on the delta of the Samur River, and a mountainous sector that includes Mount Bazardüzü and the southernmost extreme point in Russia. The coastal sector is notable for supporting a temperate-subtropical liana (widespread vines) forest. The park also protects near-shore waters of the Caspian. The park was officially created in 2019.

== Topography ==
The Samura Delta sector (10,134 km2) occupies most of the Samur River delta in the southeast of Dagestan, on the border with Azerbaijan. It lies in Derbentsky District and Magaramkentsky District. The terrain is flat, with shifting river branches, spring streams, coastal lakes, lagoons, and beaches. This sector includes the Samur liana forest, and an offshore strip of shallow water in the Caspian Sea.

The mountain sector "Shalbuzdag" (38,139 km2) lies on the northern slopes of the Caucasus Mountains, forming the Bazardyuzi-Shalbuzdag highlands. Major peaks include Mount Bazardüzü (4,466 metres (14,652 ft)), Mount Yuradag (4,466 metres (14,652 ft)), and Mount Shalbuzdag (4,142 metres (13,589 ft)). This sector is located in Dokuzparinsky District and Akhtynsky District. The southern border of this sector is also on the border between Russia and Azerbaijan.

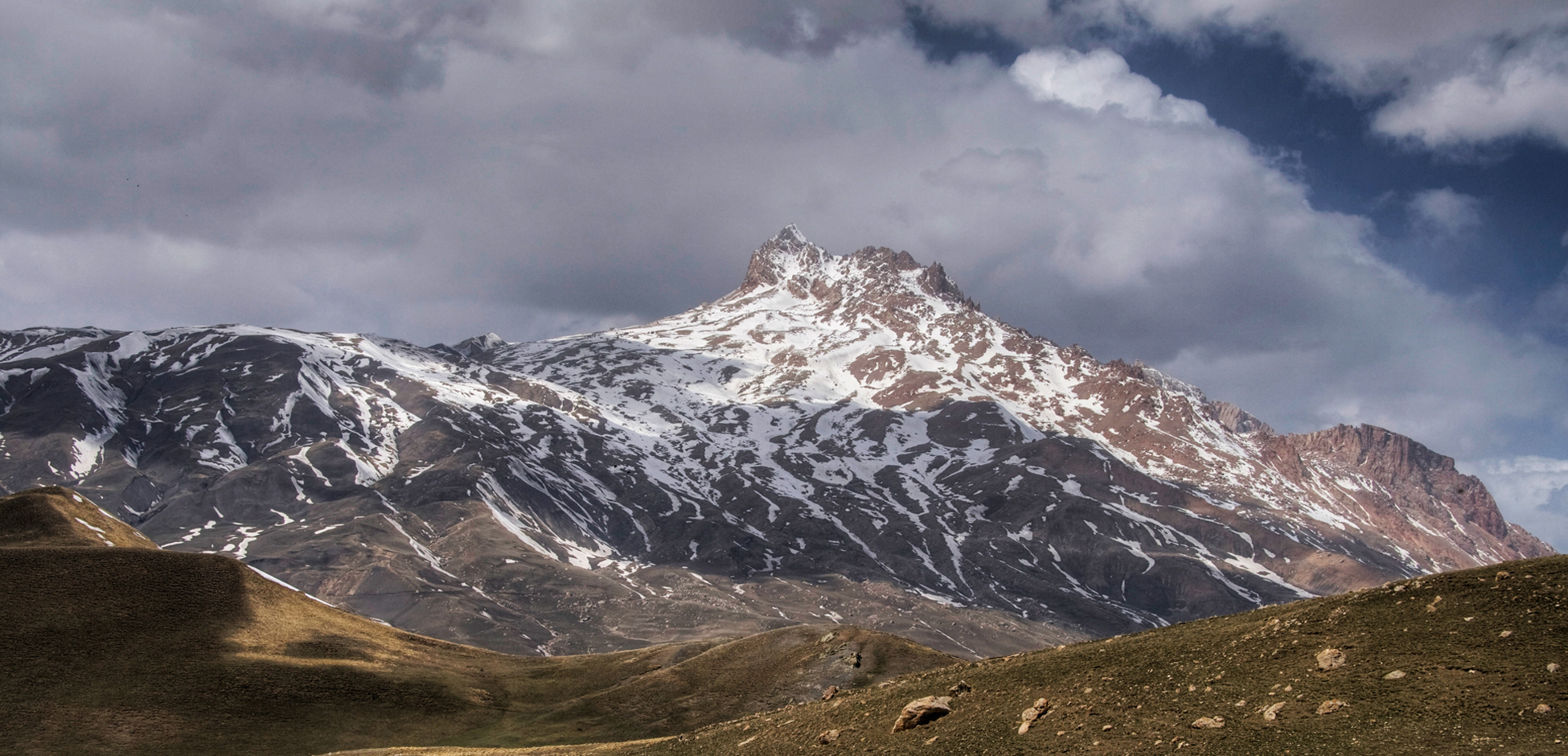
Mount Shalbuzdag, in the mountainous sector of the park

== Ecoregion and climate ==
The park is at the eastern extremity of the Caucasus mixed forests ecoregion. Because of differences of altitude zones, the mountainous sector rises above the forest zone.

The climate of Samur delta sector is Humid continental climate, warm wet summer (Köppen climate classification (Cfa)). This climate is characterized by large seasonal temperature differentials. No month averages below 0 °C (32 °F), at least one month averages above 22 °C (72 °F), and four months average over 10 °C (50 °F). Precipitation is relatively even throughout the year. Higher elevations in the mountainous sector are colder.

Derbent, Dagestan

Climate chart (precipitation, max. and min. temperature)
J	F	M	A	M	J	J	A	S	O	N	D
1.5 25 15	1.1 25 15	1.3 34 21	1.2 46 31	1.2 60 41	2 67 50	2.6 72 56	3.2 69 53	2.8 58 45	2.5 45 35	2.3 35 28	2 29 21
- █ Average max. and min. temperatures in °F
- █ Precipitation totals in inches
- Source: Weatherspark.com
Metric conversion
J	F	M	A	M	J	J	A	S	O	N	D
38 −4 −9	28 −4 −10	33 1 −6	30 8 −1	30 15 5	51 20 10	66 22 13	81 20 12	71 15 7	64 7 2	58 2 −2	51 −2 −6
- █ Average max. and min. temperatures in °C
- █ Precipitation totals in mm

== Plants and animals ==
The Samura Delta sector protects the only large liana forests in Russia. Over 500 species of vascular plants have been identified in the delta, over 1,000 species in the park overall. The dominant forest trees in the delta are English oak, common hornbeam, white poplar, alder and white willow. The Samur Delta is an important wintering area for waterfowl and near-water birds. Over 300 species of birds have been recorded in the park, 130 of which are known to nest in the area. 38% of all species known in Russia have been recorded in this one park.

The Shalbuzdag (mountainous) sector is not forested at the higher elevations, although species diversity is high overall because of the extreme altitude differences. Immediately below 3,000 meters the landscape is alpine and subalpine steppe meadows. Above 3,000 meters is scree (talus), bare rock, and glaciers.

== Controversy ==
On April 22, 2023, a group of villagers, who participated in the Russo-Ukrainian war, from Kurush in the Dokuzparinsky District of Dagestan recorded a video to Russian President Vladimir Putin and Sergey Melikov, the Head of the Republic of Dagestan, to complain about the seizure of pastureland from the villagers by local authorities that were given to Samursky National Park. In response to this appeal, the Dagestani Ministry of Natural Resources stated that during process the creating the national park, hearings were held with local residents. Shamil Khadulaev, a member of the Public Chamber of Dagestan, expressed doubt that the project had been discussed with local population, and demanded the Ministry to publish proofs. One of the individuals who made the video accused the government officials of being corrupt.

Three of the individuals in the video said that the creation of Samursky National Park in the Dokuzparinsky District violated the rights of Kurush villagers and the law, because it monopolized tourist sites in this territory and displaced the traditional economic activities of the local population. Villagers have filed complaints with a number of agencies. In response, the agencies sent letters to them stating that villagers' interests had not been violated. As of July of 2024, the Russian government had not done anything to resolve the issue.

== See also ==
- Protected areas of Russia
- Dagestan Nature Reserve
