= Caspian Economic Forum =

International economic event

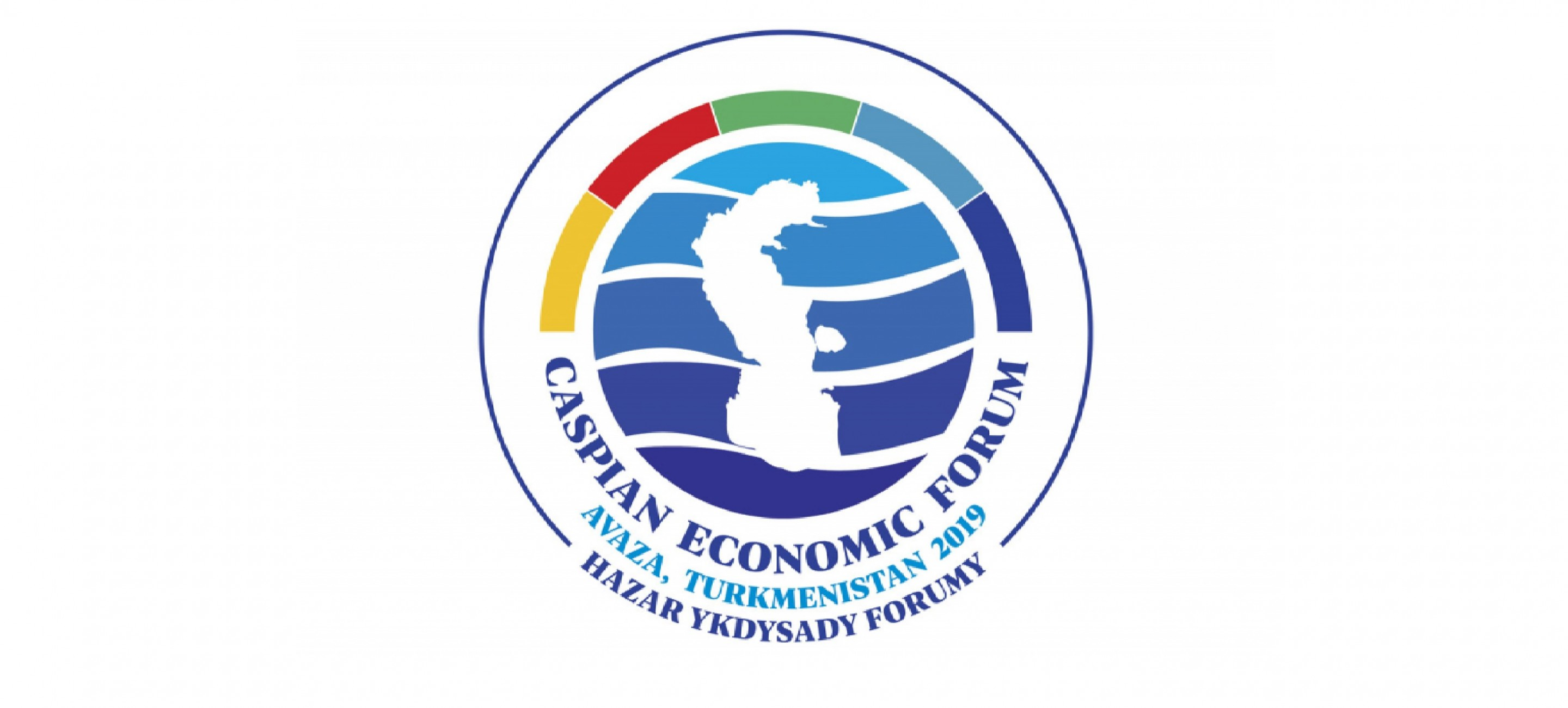
- Founder: Gurbanguly Berdimuhamedow
- Website: http://cefavaza2019.gov.tm

The Caspian Economic Forum (CEF; Turkmen: Hazar Ykdysady Forumy; Russian: Каспийский экономический форум) is an international economic event aiming to provide a platform for discussion of the issues relating to the creation of conditions for large investment projects for littoral Caspian states. First Forum was held in Avaza, Turkmenistan. The key purpose of the Forum is to help to overcome the geographical and informational barriers for investments in the Caspian region.

== Formation and Framework ==
At the V Summit of the Heads of the Caspian Littoral States in Aktau, Kazakhstan in 2018, President of Turkmenistan, Gurbanguly Berdimuhamedow initiated to hold the First Caspian Economic Forum in 2019. It was held on the anniversary of Convention on the legal status of the Caspian Sea on Aug. 12 in Turkmenistan's tourist zone of Awaza. The forum ostensibly aims to improve trade and investment among the states, particularly in relation to Caspian Sea projects. The Caspian Sea is estimated to contain some 50 billion barrels of oil and nine trillion cubic meters of gas. Properly exploited, those resources could be worth trillions of dollars. The Second Caspian Economic Forum will be held in Astrakhan city of Russia.

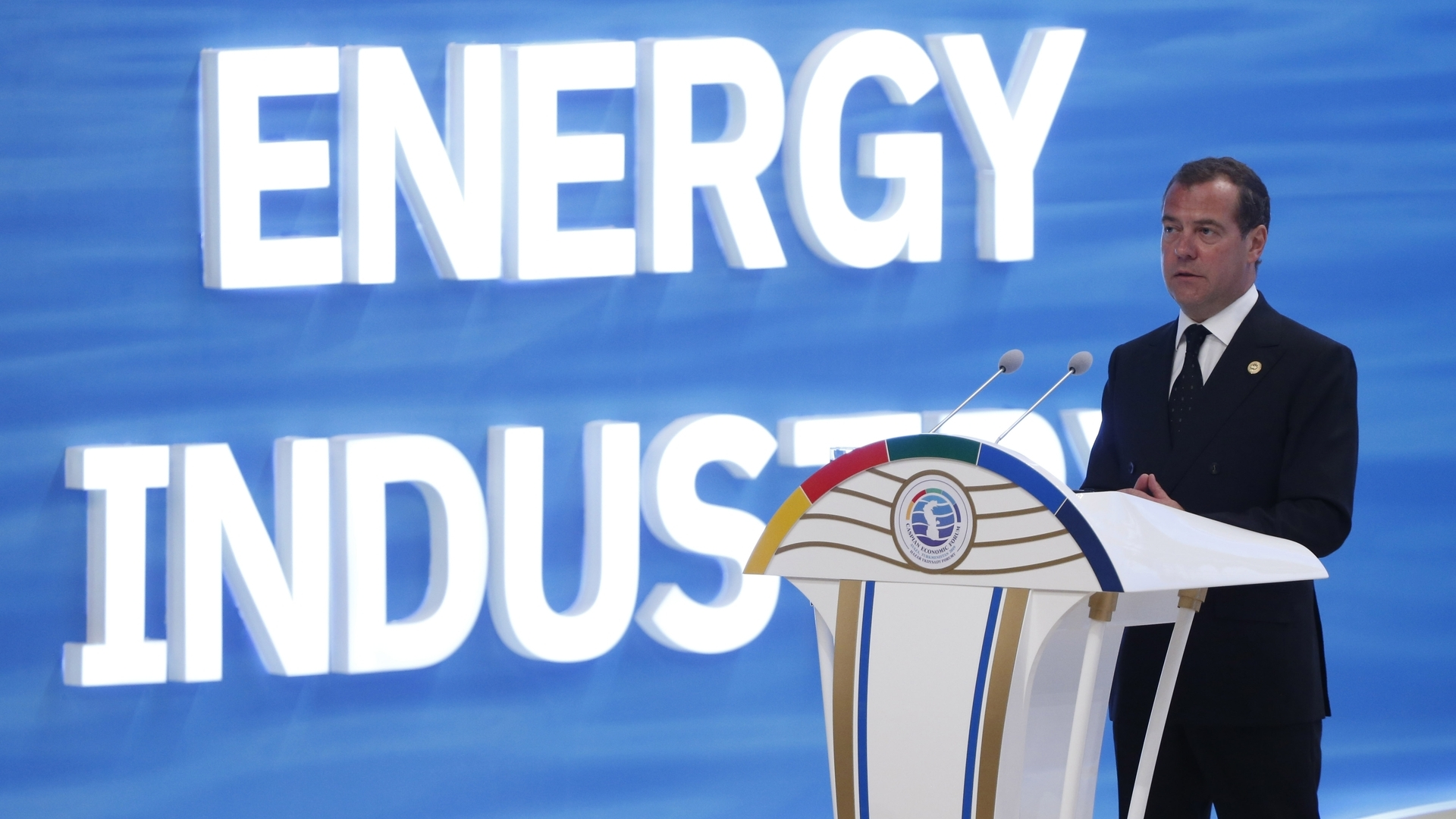
Dmitry Medvedev's remarks at the International Conference “Caspian Sea: Benefits of Developing International Economic Cooperation”
