= Sea of the Khazars =

Name for the Caspian and, earlier, the Black Sea

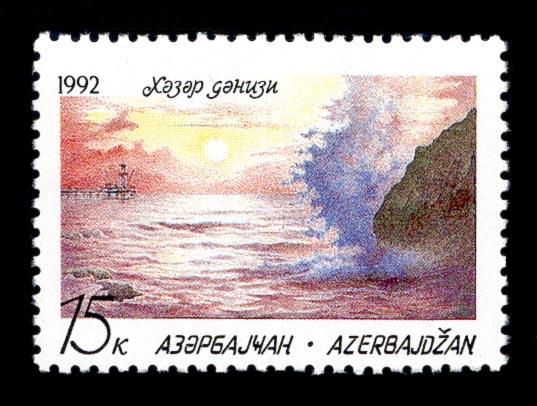
The name in Azerbaijani (Azerbaijani: Xəzər dənizi) on a postage stamp of Azerbaijan

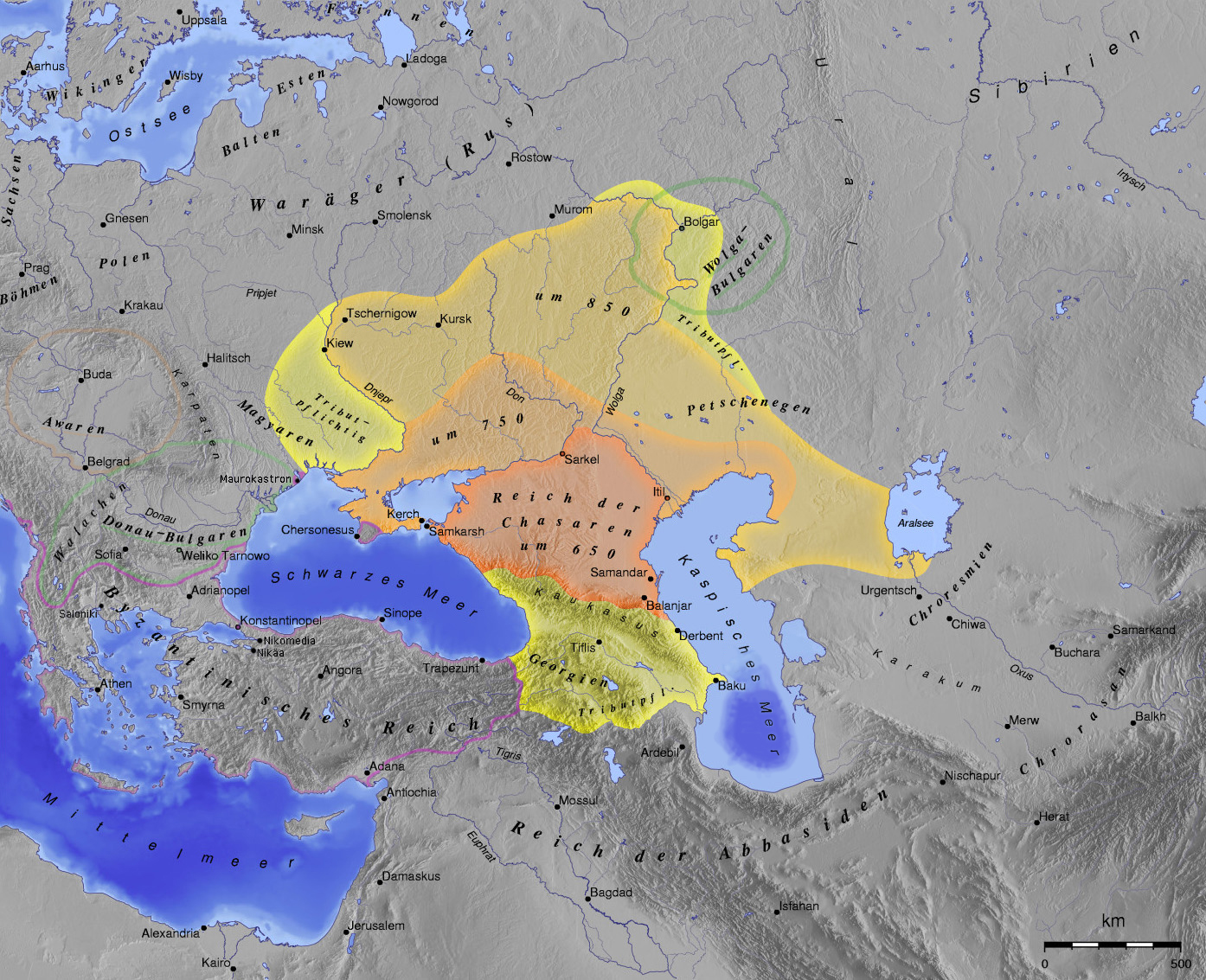
The Khazar Khaganate

Sea of the Khazars is the name of the Caspian Sea in Arabic (Arabic: بحر الخزر — Bahr al-Khazar), Persian (Persian: دریای خزر — Daryā-ye Khazar), Turkish (Turkish: Hazar Denizi), Azerbaijani (Azerbaijani: Xəzər dənizi), Turkmen (Turkmen: Hazar deňizi), Crimean Tatar (Crimean Tatar: Hazar deñizi), and Kumyk (Kumyk: Hazar dengiz). It is derived from the name of the Khazars, who created a powerful state, the Khazar Khaganate, on the northwestern coast of the Caspian Sea between the 7th and 10th centuries.

The hydronym first appeared in Arabic geographical works of the 9th century (by Ibn Khordadbeh and his followers Ibn al-Faqih and Qudama ibn Ja'far). The term "Khazar" was originally used to refer to the Black Sea, and less frequently the Sea of Azov (as the Khazar positions in Crimea were strong during that period). Starting from the 10th century, the name became established for the Caspian Sea. A less common variant of the name was Buhayra al-Khazar ("Khazar Lake"), found in the works of Al-Muqaddasi. Notably, the Khazars themselves did not sail the seas and did not possess a navy. The fact that their name remained in the historical memory of several peoples testifies to the significant role they played in the history of the region. In the 7th and 8th centuries, Khazar influence was expressed through regular raids, and later (in the 9th and 10th centuries) through active maritime trade. The capital of Khazaria, Itil, located at the mouth of the Volga river, was a major trading post for Muslim merchants.

In a Khazar source (the 10th-century letter of King Joseph) the Caspian is referred to as the "Sea of Jurjan" (Gorgan).
