= Epoch of Extreme Inundations =

The Epoch of Extreme Inundations (EEI) is a hypothetical epoch during which four landforms in the Pontic–Caspian steppe—marine lowlands (marine transgressions), river valleys (outburst floods), marine transgressions (thermokarst lakes) and slopes (solifluction flows)—were widely inundated. Catastrophic events during the epoch are theorized to have influenced prehistoric human life.

== Research history ==
In 2002, Russian geographer Andrey L. Chepalyga of the Institute of Geography at the Russian Academy of Sciences formulated the theory to explain natural events, with field investigation and laboratory work supporting the theory. Archaeological data indicated that the period impacted human life. During the first stage of research, sources were examined for extreme hydro-climatic events between 16000 and 18000 BCE in the Caspian drainage basin. Research focused on sources of water for these events, such as megafloods in river valleys and melting permafrost augmenting watersheds. The investigation's second stage included chronological correlation of the events using stratigraphy, geomorphology and radiocarbon dating. This was followed by paleohydrologic reconstruction of the basins, including their level, area, volume and water exchange between basins. Based on archeological data, the influence of the events on prehistoric human life was studied. The investigation aimed to comprehensively describe the period.

== Time and place ==
During the deglaciation following the Last Glacial Maximum, northwestern Eurasia experienced widespread flooding from the Atlantic Ocean to the Yenisei River, including the subarctic and Himalayas: over 10,000,000 square kilometres (3,900,000 sq mi). Flooding occurred in four landforms: marine lowlands, river valleys, watersheds and slopes, and peaked 17,000 to 15,000 years ago.

== Geology ==
The basins' bottom and littoral sediments and their fossils contain geological evidence of the EEI. In the Caspian basin, bottom sediments attributable to the epoch differ from the under- and overlying layers in a number of ways and are called "chocolate clays" because of their reddish-brown color. The chocolate clays and related Khvalynean sediments are usually 3–5 metres (9.8–16.4 ft), occasionally exceeding 20–25 metres (66–82 ft). They are primarily limited to the Caspian Depression, from the modern Caspian coast to the foothills of the surrounding mountains.

=== Stratigraphy ===
In the marine sequence of the Caspian basin, the Khvalynean layers are above the Late Khazarian ones (which date to the last interglacial period) and below the New Caspian (Holocene) deposits. They are separated from the Lower Khazarian series by continental Atelian layers synchronous to marine sediments from the Atelian basin. The level of the latter was 110–120 metres (360–390 ft) below the present Caspian level—in other words, 140–150 metres (460–490 ft) below sea level. In the Caspian Depression, the Khvalynean sediments occur primarily near the surface; younger still (and higher in the sequence) are the Holocene floodplain lacustrine and marine (New Caspian) sediments.

EEI deposits in the Black Sea basin occur in the New Euxinian series. On the continental slope and in the deep-sea basin, they are a light reddish-brown and a pale yellow mud .5–1 metre (20–39 in) thick. In color they resemble the chocolate clays of the Caspian basin, and their age is near that of the latter (15,000 BP).

=== Fossils ===
Indicators of an EEI are brackish-water mollusk species close to modern North Caspian ones. Among these are Caspian endemic species of the Limnocardiidae family, such as the Didacna Eichwald genus. Although the latter is not presently found outside the Caspian Sea, it occurred widely in the Azov—Black Sea basin during the Pleistocene until the Karangatian era.

Gastropods are represented by the Caspian endemic genera Caspia and Micromelania. Shells of the Early Khvalynean complex are distinguished by their small size (two to three times smaller than present ones) and thin walls. The complex is usually considered as a product of cold climate and low salinity. New Black Sea sediments contain mollusks of the Caspian type.

== Eurasian basins ==
=== Marine basins and spillways ===
Marine transgressions in the Black and Caspian Sea basins formed a number of sea-lakes (the Aral, Caspian and Black Seas and the Sea of Marmara) connected by spillways: the Uzboy River, the Kuma–Manych Depression, the Bosphorus and the Dardanelles. The large basin covered about 1,500,000 square kilometres (580,000 sq mi) and held up to 700,000 km^{3} of water and 5000 km^{3} (10 billion tons) of salt. Discharging more than 60,000 m^{3} per second, it ran 3,000 km west to east (from the Mediterranean to Central Asia) and 2,500 km (from 57 to 35°N) north to south. Its drainage basin covered more than three million km^{3}.

The Eurasian cascade system of seas and lakes is unparalleled in water area. The largest intra-continental lake system of today (the Great Lakes of North America) is six times smaller (245,000 km^{2}), with a water volume 30 times smaller (22,700 km^{3}), a discharge four times smaller (14,000 m^{3}/s) and a drainage basin three times smaller.

The peak inundation apparently centered on the Khvalynean basin (the recent Caspian Sea). Its level rose and its area increased six times, to one million square kilometers. Its water volume doubled (to 130,000 km^{3}), with a salinity of 10-12‰. Its waters overflowed the Caspian depression down the Manych-Kerch spillway.

=== Sources of water ===
Additional water sources would have been necessary for the EEI. To fill the Caspian basin to a level of more than 50 metres (160 ft) would require as much as 70,000 km^{3} of water, equivalent to 200 years of river discharge into the Caspian Sea. Water flowed through the Manych Spillway (250 to 1,000 km^{3} per year) and some (more than 100 km^{3} per year) was lost through evaporation. Water may have come from:

- Outburst floods in river valleys
- Melting of permafrost
- Increased runoff due to permafrost
- Greater drainage basin (including Central Asia, now closed)
- Decreased evaporation due to winter ice

Outburst floods have been inferred from studies of macromeanders in river valleys. Macromeanders dated to the EEI exceed modern ones in size. Their width tends to increase from north to south; they are similar to modern meanders on the tundra, two to three times wider at the tree line, three to five times wider in the taiga, five to eight times wider in the mixed-forest zone, 10 times wider in the broadleaf zone and 13 times in the forest steppe and the steppe.

== Catastrophe ==
The rate of water-level rise during the EEI may be inferred from the duration of the epoch, estimated at five to six hundred years. Assuming an equal length of the phases of rising, high water and subsiding (150 to 200 years each), the sea level would rise by 180–190 metres (590–620 ft) at a rate of at least one meter per year.

The Caspian Sea has risen 2.5 metres (8 ft 2 in) since 1978, as much as 10 centimetres (3.9 in) per year, with an adverse impact on human activity. The Khvalynean transgression was more catastrophic, especially the rate of coastline shift in the plains of the North Caspian region. The coastline moved from the Atelian coast (near the Mangyshlak sill) 1,000 kilometres (620 mi) north, 5 to 10 kilometres (3.1 to 6.2 mi) a year. Even greater was the northward migration of the mouth of the Volga River, which moved more than 2,000 kilometres (1,200 mi) upstream in 150 to 200 years—more than 10 kilometres (6.2 mi) annually, or about 30 metres (98 ft) per day.

== Influence on humans ==
Floodplains and natural spillways influenced human migration. P. M. Dolukhanov of the School of Historical Studies at Newcastle University has concluded that the Caspian-Black Sea spillway across the Kumo-Manych valley isolated the Caucasus and Central Asia. The spread of Upper Paleolithic technology in the region became possible only after the crest of the Upper Khvalynian transgression from 12,500 to 12,000 BP. At Kamennaya Balka, an Upper Paleolithic site in Russia, of three layers the lower and upper ones contain small stone tools of Near Eastern origin. This indicates cultural connections in the southern regions (the Caucasus and Iraq). The middle layer indicates an indigenous Kamennaya Balka culture, without small stone tools. Its age (17,000 to 15,000 BP) coincides with Manych-Kerch spillway activity, which may have been a barrier to cultural connections with the Near East. The EEI affected human activity; there is no archaeological evidence that it destroyed civilizations, although A. L. Chepalyga suggests that it may have been the basis for flood myths.

== See also ==
- Black Sea deluge hypothesis
- West Siberian Glacial Lake
