= Caspia =

Scientific classification
- Kingdom: Animalia
- Phylum: Mollusca
- Class: Gastropoda
- Subclass: Caenogastropoda
- Order: Littorinimorpha
- Family: Hydrobiidae
- Subfamily: Caspiinae
- Genus: Caspia; Dybowski, 1888

Genus of gastropods

Caspia is a genus of marine snails, brackish water snails and freshwater snails with a gill and an operculum, an aquatic gastropod mollusk in the family Hydrobiidae. Caspia is the type genus of the Caspiidae, that is a synonym of Pyrgulinae.

== Species ==
Species within the genus Caspia include:

- Caspia baerii Clessin & W. Dybowski in W. Dybowski, 1888 - type species, marine
- Caspia brotzkajae Starobogatov in Anistratenko & Prisjazhnjuk, 1992 - marine
- Caspia gaillardi (Tadjalli-Pour, 1977) - marine
- Caspia gmelinii Clessin & W. Dybowski in W. Dybowski, 1888 - marine
- Caspia knipowitchi Makarov, 1938 - marine and brackish
- Caspia logvinenkoi (Golikov & Starobogatov, 1966) - freshwater
- Caspia makarovi (Golikov & Starobogatov, 1966) - freshwater and brackish
- Caspia pallasii Clessin & W. Dybowski, 1887
- Caspia stanislavi Alexenko & Starobogatov, 1987 - freshwater and brackish
- Caspia valkanovi (Golikov & Starobogatov, 1966)

Species brought into synonymy

- Caspia issykkulensis Clessin, 1894: synonym of Pseudocaspia issykkulensis (Clessin, 1894)
