= Wildlife of Kazakhstan =

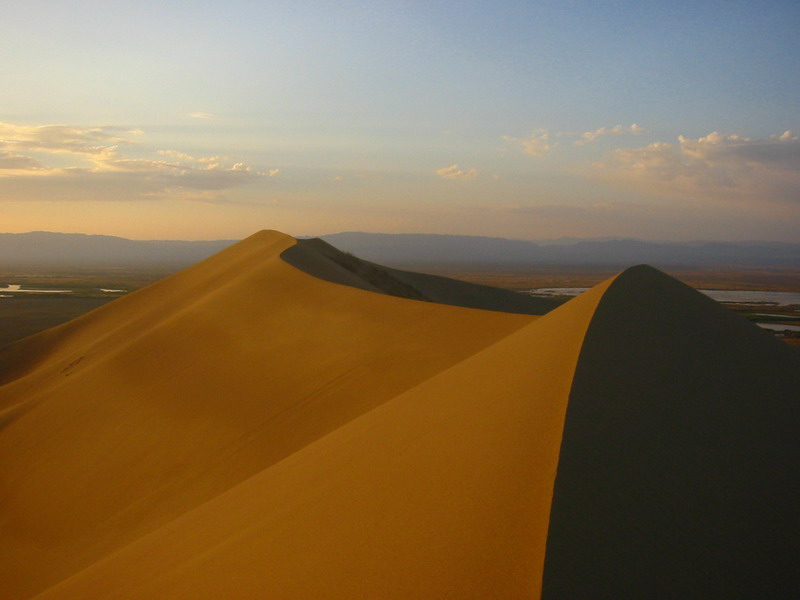
Sand dunes in the valley of the Ili River, Altyn-Emel National Park.

The wildlife of Kazakhstan includes its flora, fauna, and funga and their natural habitats.

== Fauna ==
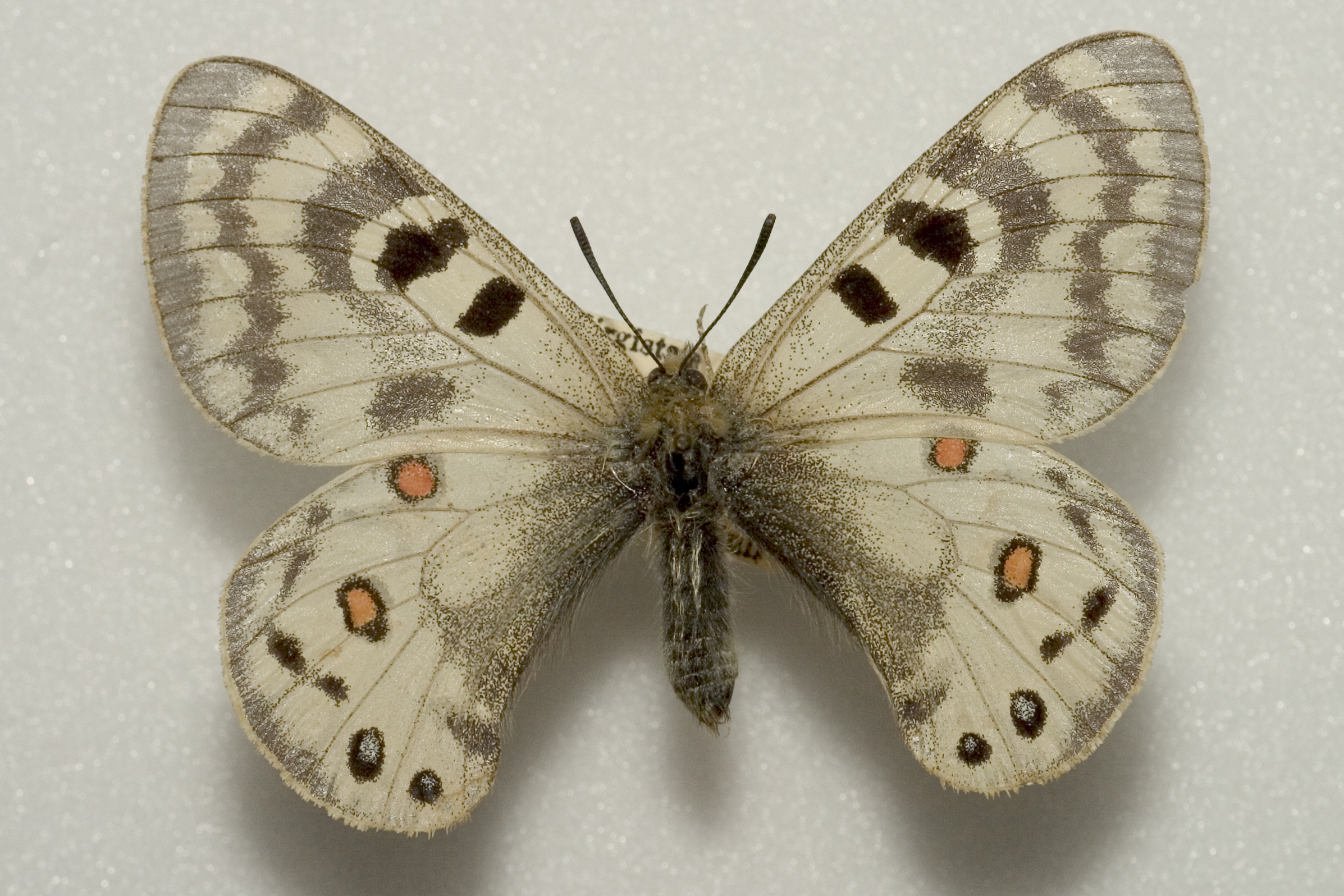
Parnassius delphius

- Argali
- Barbel
- Beluga sturgeon
- Caspian seal
- Channidae
- Great gerbil
- Spotted whip snake
- Jerboa
- Banded Apollo butterfly
- Reticulated toad-headed agama lizard
- Russian desman
- Russian tortoise
- Sterlet
- Brilliant ground agama lizard
- Desert monitor

=== Ungulates ===
- Bactrian camel
- Central Asian red deer
- Goitered gazelle
- Moose
- Saiga antelope
- Turkmenian kulan
- Urial

=== Carnivorans ===
- Asiatic wildcat
- Caracal
- Dhole
- Eurasian brown bear
- Gray wolf
- Jungle cat
- Pallas's cat
- Snow leopard
- Turkestan lynx
- Steppe wolf
- Sand cat

=== Birds ===
The avifauna of Kazakhstan includes a total of 513 species, of which 5 are rare or accidental.

- White stork
- Golden eagle
- Squacco heron
- Steppe eagle
- Great bustard
- Greater flamingo
- Common spoonbill

== Flora and funga ==
The diversity of a flora of Kazakhstan varies considerably both by structure and number of taxa, and by geography, in particular, by nature-climatic zones and high-altitude belts. In Kazakhstan there are more than 6,000 species of highest vascular plants, about 5,000 species of mushrooms, 485 species of lichen, and more than 2,010 species of seaweed.

== See also ==
- List of mammals of Kazakhstan
