= Sabanchi, Yanaulsky District, Republic of Bashkortostan =

Sabanchi Сабанчи
- Village
- Location within Bashkortostan Location within Russia
- Coordinates: 56°13′N 55°03′E
- Country: Russia
- Region: Bashkortostan
- District: Yanaulsky District
- Time zone: UTC+5:00

Sabanchi (Russian: Сабанчи; Bashkir: Һабансы, Habansı) is a rural locality (a village) in Istyaksky Selsoviet, Yanaulsky District, Bashkortostan, Russia. The population was 7 as of 2010. There is 1 street.

== Geography ==
Sabanchi is located 10 km southeast of Yanaul (the district's administrative centre) by road. Akhtiyal is the nearest rural locality.
