= Yarudağ =

Mountain in northern Azerbaijan

Yarudagh
- Azerbaijani: Yarudağ
- Location within Caucasus Mountains Location within Azerbaijan

Highest point
- Elevation: 4,116 m (13,504 ft)
- Listing: Highest peaks of Azerbaijan
- Coordinates: 41°17′22″N 47°56′04″E

Geography
- Country: Azerbaijan
- District: Qusar
- Parent range: Greater Caucasus

Yarudagh is a mountain peak of the Greater Caucasus range, located in the Qusar District of Azerbaijan. With an elevation of 4,116 metres (13,504 ft) above sea level, it fourth highest mountain in Azerbaijan.
