= Island country =

State with territory consisting of islands

Sovereign states and a de facto state (Taiwan) fully on islands: those with land borders shaded green, and those without shaded blue. Countries/territories not shown on the map include: Antarctica (aq) (continental disputed territory), Australia (au) (continental country), the Cook Islands (ck) (free association with New Zealand), Greenland (gl) (autonomous territory of the Kingdom of Denmark), and Puerto Rico (pr) (unincorporated U.S. territory).

An island country, island state, or island nation is a country the primary territory of which consists of one or more islands or parts of islands. Approximately 25% of all independent countries are island countries. Island countries are historically more stable than many continental states but are vulnerable to conquest by naval superpowers. Indonesia is the largest and most populated island country (and the fourth most populated country overall).

There is great variation among island countries' economies: they may rely mainly on extractive industries, such as mining, fishing and agriculture, and/or on services such as transit hubs, tourism, and financial services. Many islands have low-lying geographies and their economies and population centers develop along coast plains and ports; such states may be vulnerable to the effects of climate change, especially sea level rise.

Remote or significant islands and archipelagos that are not themselves sovereign are often known as dependencies or overseas territories.

== Politics ==
Historically, island countries have tended to be less prone to political instability than their continental counterparts. The percentage of island countries that are democratic is higher than that of continental countries.

=== Island territories ===
While island countries by definition are sovereign states, there are also several islands and archipelagos around the world that operate semi-autonomously from their official sovereign states. These are often known as dependencies or overseas territories and can be similar in nature to proper island countries.

== War ==
Island countries have often been the basis of maritime conquest and historical rivalry between other countries. Island countries are more susceptible to attack by large, continental countries due to their size and dependence on sea and air lines of communication. Many island countries are also vulnerable to predation by mercenaries and other foreign invaders, although their isolation also makes them a difficult target.

== Natural resources ==
Many developing small island countries rely heavily on fish for their main supply of food. Some are turning to renewable energy—such as wind power, solar power, hydropower, geothermal power, and biomass.

== Geography ==
Some island countries are more affected than other countries by climate change, which produces problems such as reduced land use, water scarcity, and sometimes even resettlement issues. Some low-lying island countries are slowly being submerged by the rising water levels of the Pacific Ocean. Climate change also impacts island countries by causing natural disasters such as tropical cyclones, hurricanes, flash floods and droughts.

=== Climate change ===
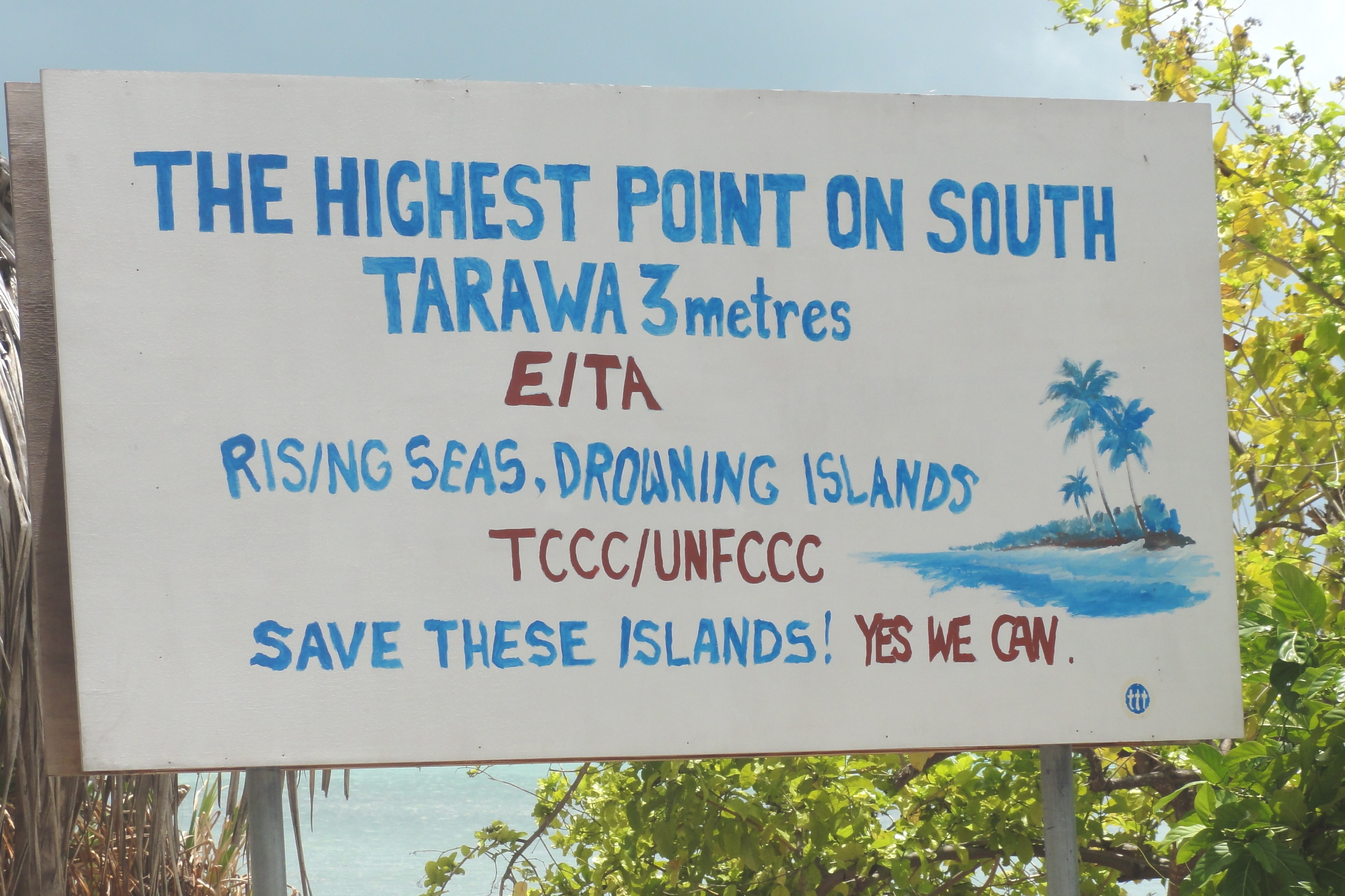
A sign on South Tarawa, Kiribati pointing out the threat of sea level rise to the island, with its highest point being only three metres above sea level.

The effects of climate change, including sea level rise, increasing heavy rain events, tropical cyclones and storm surges, threaten the existence of many island countries, their peoples and cultures. They also alter ecosystems and natural environments in those countries. Small island developing states (SIDS) are a heterogenous group of countries but many of them are particularly at risk due to climate change. Those countries have been quite vocal in calling attention to the challenges they face from climate change. In a 2025 cross-national survey of 14,710 people across 55 small-island states and territories found an 89 to nearly 100% acceptance of human-caused climate change.

However, when addressing smaller island communities, it is important to consider the empirical gap. Currently, there are issues with having adequate data that best supports these communities’ opinions, beliefs, and behavior on climate change. Geologically, it is difficult to survey these countries because of obstacles with service or low internet access. Addressing this empirical gap means that we perform essential research to better obtain perspective from these smaller countries, working together to find efficient solutions to slow climate change. For example, the Maldives and nations of the Caribbean and Pacific Islands are already experiencing considerable impacts of climate change. It is critical for them to implement climate change adaptation measures fast.

Some small and low population islands do not have the resources to protect their islands and natural resources. They experience climate hazards which impact on human health, livelihoods, and inhabitable space. This can lead to pressure to leave these islands but resources to do so are often lacking as well.

Efforts to combat these challenges are ongoing and multinational. Many of the small island developing countries have a high vulnerability to climate change, whilst having contributed very little to global greenhouse gas emissions. Therefore, some small island countries have made advocacy for global cooperation on climate change mitigation a key aspect of their foreign policy.

== Economics ==
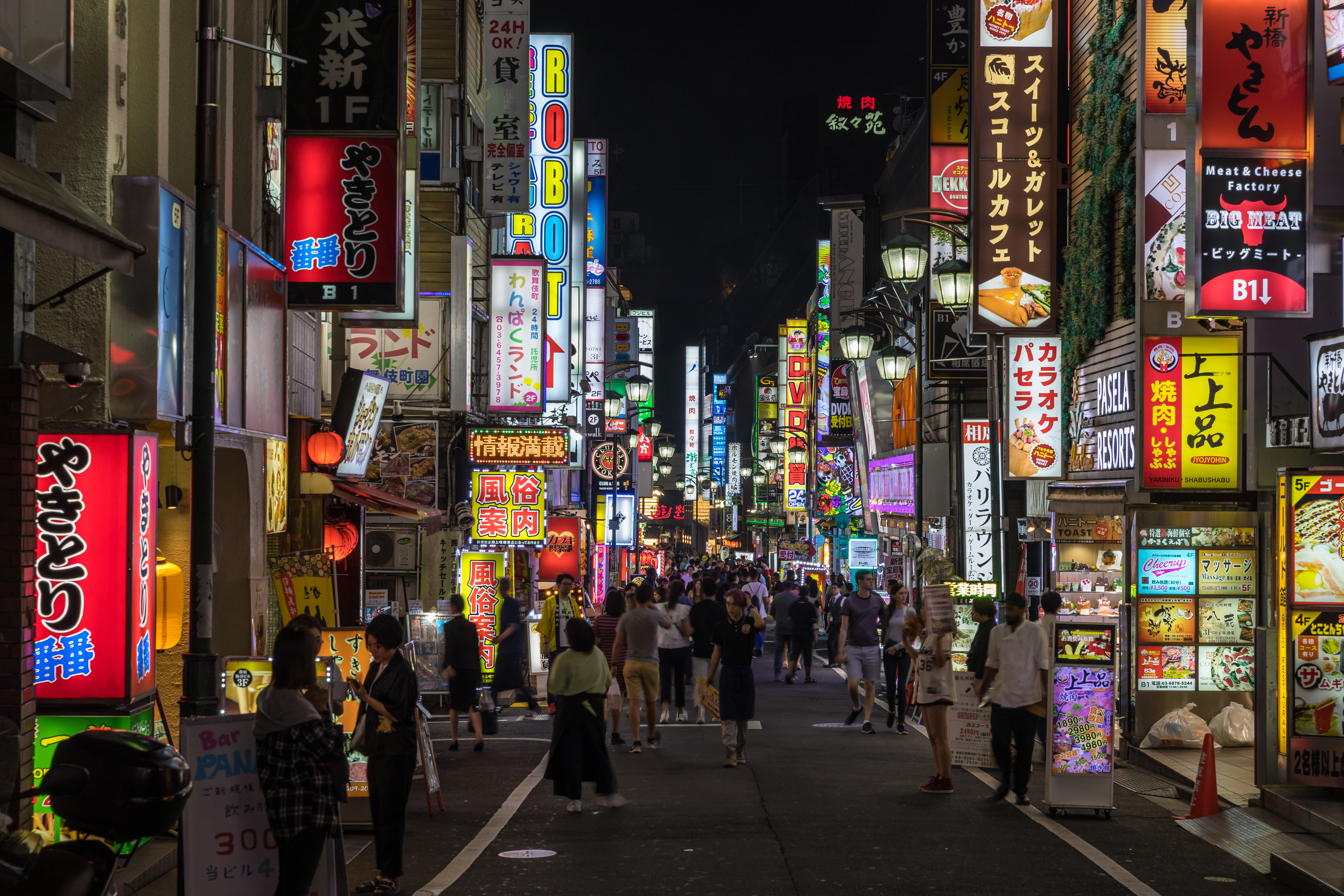
Japan is an archipelago in Asia that constitutes one of the richest and most populated nations on Earth.

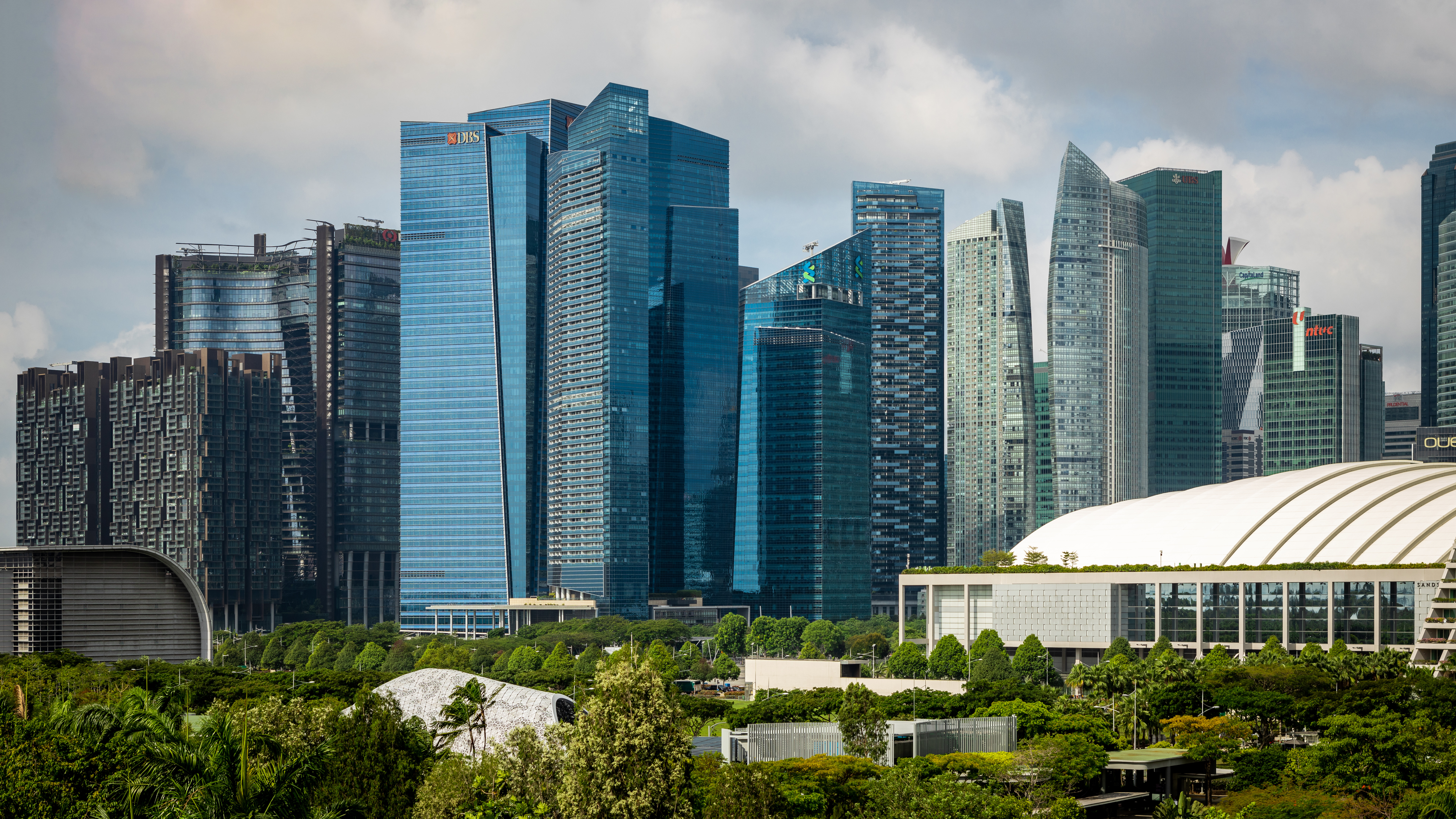
Singapore, an affluent and highly developed sovereign island country by which its territories consists of a main island and other smaller islands

Many island countries rely heavily on imports and are greatly affected by changes in the global economy. Due to the nature of island countries their economies are often characterised by being smaller, relatively isolated from world trade and economy, more vulnerable to shipping costs, and more likely to suffer environmental damage to infrastructure; exceptions include Japan, Taiwan and the United Kingdom. The dominant industry for many island countries is tourism.

== Composition ==
Island countries are typically small with low populations, although some, like Indonesia, Japan, and the Philippines are notable exceptions.

Some island countries are centred on one or two major islands, such as Bahrain, Cuba, Iceland, Malta, New Zealand, Singapore, Sri Lanka, Taiwan, Trinidad and Tobago, and the United Kingdom. Others are spread out over hundreds or thousands of smaller islands, such as The Bahamas, Indonesia, Japan, the Maldives, the Philippines, and Seychelles. Some island countries share one or more of their islands with other countries, such as Ireland and the United Kingdom; the Dominican Republic and Haiti; and Indonesia, which shares islands with Brunei, Timor-Leste, Malaysia, and Papua New Guinea. Bahrain, Singapore, and the United Kingdom have fixed links such as bridges and tunnels to the continental landmass: Bahrain is linked to Saudi Arabia by the King Fahd Causeway, Singapore to Malaysia by the Johor–Singapore Causeway and Second Link, and the United Kingdom has a railway connection to France through the Channel Tunnel.

Geographically, the country of Australia is considered a continental landmass rather than an island, covering the largest landmass of the Australian continent. In the past, however, it was considered an island country for tourism purposes (among others) and is sometimes referred to as such.

== See also ==
- Archipelagic state
- Effects of climate change on island nations
- Landlocked country
- List of Caribbean island countries by population
- List of island countries
- List of islands by area
- List of islands by country
- List of sovereign states and dependent territories in Oceania
- List of sovereign states and dependent territories in the Indian Ocean
- Microstate
- City state
- Pacific Islands Forum
- Small Island Developing States
- Thalassocracy
