= Eurasia =

Combined landmasses of Europe and Asia

Coordinates: 50°N 80°E

- Area: 55,000,000 km^{2} (21,000,000 sq mi)
- Population: 5.6 billion (As of 2025)
- Population density: 102/km^{2} (260/sq mi)
- Demonym: Eurasian
- Countries: 104 countries
- Dependencies: 9 dependencies
- Time zone: UTC−1 to UTC+12
- Part of: Afro-Eurasia

Eurasia (/jʊərˈeɪʒə/ yoor-AY-zhə, also UK: /-ʃə/ -shə), is the largest continental area on Earth, comprising all of Europe and Asia. According to some models of the world, physio-graphically, Eurasia is a single continent. The concept of Europe and Asia as distinct continents dates back to antiquity, and is largely cultural, but their borders have historically been subject to change. For example, the ancient Greeks originally included Africa in Asia but classified Europe as separate land. Eurasia is connected to Africa at the Suez Canal, and the two are sometimes combined to describe the largest contiguous landmass on Earth, Afro-Eurasia.

== History ==
Eurasia has been the host of many ancient civilizations, including those based in Mesopotamia, Egypt, the Indus Valley, and China. In the Axial Age (mid-first millennium BCE), a continuous belt of civilizations stretched through the Eurasian subtropical zone from the Atlantic to the Pacific. This belt became the mainstream of world history for two millennia.

New connections emerged between the subregions of Eurasia from the Age of Discovery onwards, with the Iberians discovering new maritime routes in the 1490s, and the 1869 completion of the Suez Canal having paved the way for direct passage through the Indo-Mediterranean and the wave of Western European "New Imperialism" that dominated Africa and Asia until the mid-20th century. The communist presence in Eurasia (primarily driven by the Soviet Union) then dominated much of the continent until the end of the Cold War in 1991.

== Geography ==
Primarily in the Northern and Eastern Hemispheres, Eurasia spans from Iceland and the Iberian Peninsula in the west to the Russian Far East, and from the Russian Far North to Maritime Southeast Asia in the south, but other specific geographical limits of Eurasia states that the southern limit is in the Weber's line. Eurasia is bordered by Africa to the southwest, the Atlantic Ocean to the west, the Arctic Ocean to the north, the Pacific Ocean to the east, and the Indo-Mediterranean to the south. The division between Europe and Asia as two continents is a historical social construct, as neither fits the usual definition; thus, in some parts of the world, Eurasia is recognized as the largest of the six, five, or four continents on Earth.

Eurasia covers around 55 million square kilometres (21 million square miles), or around 36.2% of the Earth's total land area. The landmass contains well over 5 billion people, equating to approximately 70% of the human population. Humans first settled in Eurasia from Africa 125,000 years ago.

The coastline of Eurasia contains many peninsulas, including the Arabian Peninsula, Korean Peninsula, Indian subcontinent, (Note: Despite being considered a sub-continent, the peninsula definition is applied to southern India.) Anatolia Peninsula, Kamchatka Peninsula, and the Italian Peninsula.

Due to its vast size and differences in latitude, Eurasia exhibits all types of climates under the Köppen classification, including the harshest types of hot and cold temperatures, high and low precipitation, and various types of ecosystems.

Eurasia is considered a supercontinent, part of the supercontinent of Afro-Eurasia or simply a continent in its own right. In plate tectonics, the Eurasian Plate includes Europe and most of Asia but not the Indian subcontinent, the Arabian Peninsula or the area of the Russian Far East east of the Chersky Range.

From the point of view of history and culture, Eurasia can be loosely subdivided into Western Eurasia and Eastern Eurasia.

=== Geology ===
In geology, Eurasia is often considered as a single rigid mega block, but this is debated. Eurasia formed between 375 and 325 million years ago with the merging of Siberia, Kazakhstania, and Baltica, which was joined to Laurentia (North America), to form Euramerica.

=== Rivers ===
This is a list of the longest rivers in Eurasia. Included are all rivers over 3,000 km (1,900 mi).

	River	Countries	Length	
	River	Countries	km	mi
1	Yangtze (Cháng Jiāng 长江)	China	6,300	3,915
2	Yellow River (Huáng Hé 黄河)	China	5,464	3,395
3	Mekong	China, Myanmar, Laos, Thailand, Cambodia, Vietnam	4,909	3,050
4	Lena (Лена)	Russia	4,294	2,668
5	Irtysh (Иртыш)	Mongolia, China, Kazakhstan, Russia	4,248	2,640
6	Brahmaputra (ब्रह्मपुत्र)	China, India, Bangladesh	3,969	2,466
7	Ob (Обь)	Russia	3,700	2,299
8	Volga (Во́лга)	Russia	3,531	2,194
9	Yenisey (Енисей)	Mongolia, Russia	3,487	2,167
10	Indus (सिन्धु/Síndhu/سندھ/سند/سنڌوءَ)	China, India, Pakistan	3,150	1,957

=== Mountains ===
All of the 100 highest mountains on Earth are in Eurasia, in the Himalaya, Karakoram, Hindu Kush, Pamir, Hengduan, and Tian Shan mountain ranges, and all peaks above 7,000 metres (23,000 ft) are in these ranges and the Transhimalaya. Other high ranges include the Kunlun, Hindu Raj, and Caucasus Mountains. The Alpide belt stretches 15,000 kilometres (9,300 mi) across southern Eurasia, from Java in Maritime Southeast Asia to the Iberian Peninsula in Western Europe, including the ranges of the Himalayas, Karakoram, Hindu Kush, Alborz, Caucasus, and the Alps. Long ranges outside the Alpide Belt include the East Siberian, Altai, Scandinavian, Qinling, Western Ghats, Vindhya, Byrranga, and Annamite Ranges.

=== Islands ===
The largest Eurasian islands by area are Borneo, Sumatra, Honshu, Great Britain, Sulawesi, Java, Luzon, Iceland, Mindanao, Ireland, Hokkaido, Sakhalin, and Sri Lanka. The five most-populated islands in the world are Java, Honshu, Great Britain, Luzon, and Sumatra. Other Eurasian islands with large populations include Mindanao, Taiwan, Salsette, Borneo, Sri Lanka, Sulawesi, Kyushu, and Hainan. The most densely populated islands in Eurasia are Caubian Gamay Island, Ap Lei Chau, and Navotas Island. In the Arctic Ocean, Severny Island, Nordaustlandet, October Revolution Island, and Bolshevik Island are Eurasia's largest uninhabited islands, and Kotelny Island, Alexandra Land, and Spitsbergen are the least-densely populated.

== Russian geopolitical ideology ==
Originally, "Eurasia" is a geographical notion: in this sense, it is simply the biggest continent; the combined landmass of Europe and Asia. However, geopolitically, the word has several meanings, reflecting specific geopolitical interests. "Eurasia" is one of the most important geopolitical concepts and it figures prominently in the commentaries on the ideas of Halford Mackinder. As Zbigniew Brzezinski observed on Eurasia:

... how America 'manages' Eurasia is critical. A power that dominates 'Eurasia' would control two of the world's three most advanced and economically productive regions. A mere glance at the map also suggests that control over 'Eurasia' would almost automatically entail Africa's subordination, rendering the Western Hemisphere and Oceania geopolitically peripheral to the world's central continent. About 75 per cent of the world's people live in 'Eurasia', and most of the world's physical wealth is there as well, both in its enterprises and underneath its soil. 'Eurasia' accounts for about three-fourths of the world's known energy resources.

— Zbigniew Brzezinski, The grand chessboard : American primacy and its geostrategic imperatives

The Russian "Eurasianism" corresponded initially more or less to the land area of Imperial Russia in 1914, including parts of Eastern Europe. One of Russia's main geopolitical interests lies in ever closer integration with those countries that it considers part of "Eurasia".

The term Eurasia gained geopolitical reputation as one of the three super-states in 1984, George Orwell's novel where constant surveillance and propaganda are strategic elements (introduced as reflexive antagonists) of the heterogeneous dispositif such metapolitical constructs used to control and exercise power.

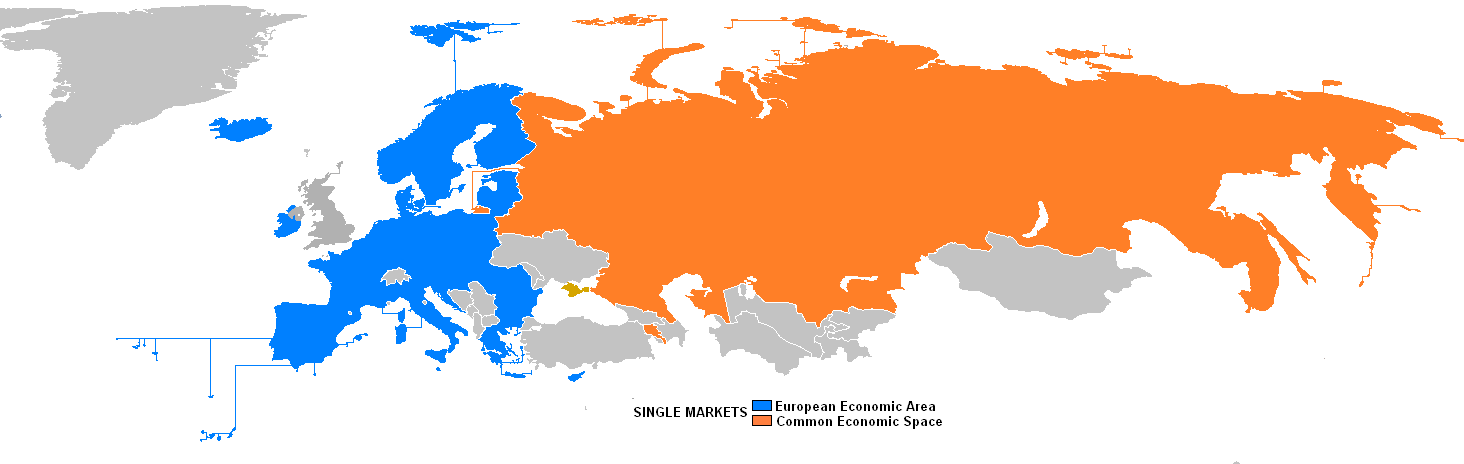
Single markets in European and post-Soviet countries; European Economic Area and Common Economic Space

== Regional organizations and alliances ==
Across Eurasia, several single markets have emerged, including the Eurasian Economic Space, European Single Market, ASEAN Economic Community, and the Gulf Cooperation Council. There are also several international organizations and initiatives which seek to promote integration throughout Eurasia, including:

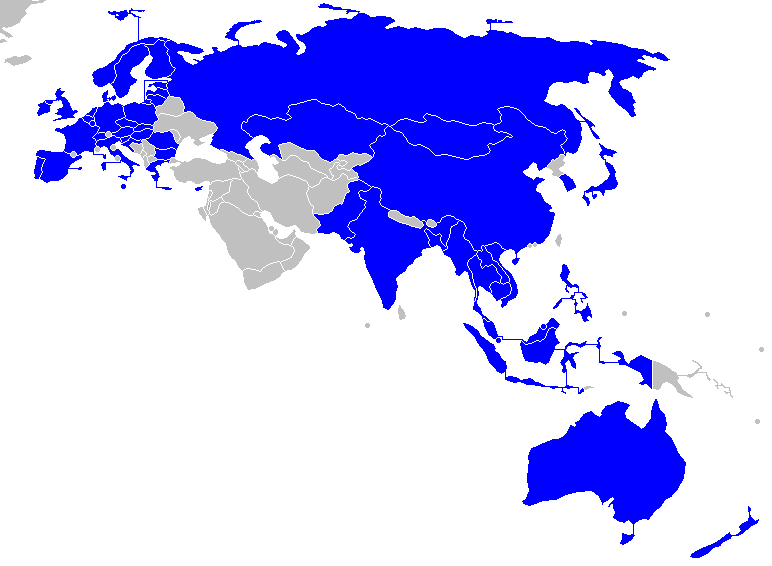
ASEM Partners

=== Asia-Europe Meeting ===
- Every two years since 1996 a meeting of most Asian and European countries is organized as the Asia–Europe Meeting (ASEM).

=== Commonwealth of Independent States ===
- The Commonwealth of Independent States (CIS) is a political and economic association of 10 post-Soviet republics in Eurasia formed following the dissolution of the Soviet Union. It has an estimated population of 239,796,010. The CIS encourages cooperation in economic, political, and military affairs and has certain powers to coordinate trade, finance, lawmaking and security. In addition, six members of the CIS have joined the Collective Security Treaty Organization, an intergovernmental military alliance that was founded in 1992.

Member states of the Eurasian Economic Union Observer states Other candidate states

=== Eurasian Economic Union ===
- Similar in concept to the European Union, the Eurasian Economic Union is an economic union established in 2015 including Russia, Armenia, Belarus, Kazakhstan, Kyrgyzstan and observer members Moldova, Uzbekistan, and Cuba. It is headquartered in Moscow, Russia and Minsk, Belarus. The union promotes economic integration among members and is theoretically open to enlargement to include any country in Europe or Asia.

=== Federation of Euro-Asian Stock Exchanges ===
- The Federation of Euro-Asian Stock Exchanges (FEAS) is an international organization headquartered in Yerevan, comprising the main stock exchanges in Eastern Europe, the Middle East and Central Asia. The purpose of the Federation is to contribute to the cooperation, development, support and promotion of capital markets in the Eurasian region.

Area from Lisbon to Vladivostok with all European and CIS countries

=== Russia-EU Common Spaces ===
- The Russia – EU Four Common Spaces Initiative, is a joint European Union and Russian agreement to closer integrate Russia and the EU, remove barriers to trade and investment and promote reforms and competitiveness. In 2010, Russian Prime Minister Vladimir Putin called for common economic space, free-trade area or more advanced economic integration, stretching from Lisbon to Vladivostok. However, no significant progress was made and the project was put on hold after Russia-EU relations deteriorated following the Russo-Ukrainian War in 2014.

=== Shanghai Cooperation Organization ===
- The Shanghai Cooperation Organization is a Eurasian political, economic and security alliance, the creation of which was announced on 15 June 2001 in Shanghai, China. It is the largest regional organisation in the world in terms of geographical coverage and population, covering three-fifths of the Eurasian continent and nearly half of the human population.

=== Greater Eurasian Partnership and continental union ===
The Greater Eurasian Partnership is an initiative of Russian President Vladimir Putin, put forward in his address to the Federal Assembly in 2015 with the aim of forming a broad integration framework on the Eurasian continent, as indicated by the Russian Foreign Ministry. In Perm on 29 May 2025, Sergey Lavrov stated at the Eurasian International Socio-Political Hearings on the Formation of an Architecture of an Equal and Indivisible System of Security and Cooperation in the Eurasian Space in 2025 that "the Greater Eurasian Partnership is not limited to economics, trade, transport and logistics alone. It is the material basis for another Russian initiative - the initiative to form a Eurasian security architecture, which Putin put forward in his speech at the Russian Foreign Ministry on 14 June 2024. In Africa, there is a pan-continental organization, the African Union, in Latin America - CELAC, but in Eurasia there is no such pan-continental association yet."

== Use of term ==
=== History of the Europe–Asia division ===
In ancient times, the Greeks classified Europe (derived from the mythological Phoenician princess Europa) and Asia which to the Greeks originally included Africa (derived from Asia, a woman in Greek mythology) as separate "lands". Where to draw the dividing line between the two regions is still a matter of discussion. Especially whether the Kuma-Manych Depression or the Caucasus Mountains form the southeast boundary is disputed, since Mount Elbrus would be part of Europe in the latter case, making it (and not Mont Blanc) Europe's highest mountain. Most accepted is probably the boundary as defined by Philip Johan von Strahlenberg in the 18th century. He defined the dividing line along the Aegean Sea, Dardanelles, Sea of Marmara, Bosporus, Black Sea, Kuma–Manych Depression, Caspian Sea, Ural River, and the Ural Mountains. However, at least part of this definition has been subject to criticism by many modern analytical geographers like Halford Mackinder, who saw little validity in the Ural Mountains as a boundary between continents.

=== Soviet states after decentralization ===
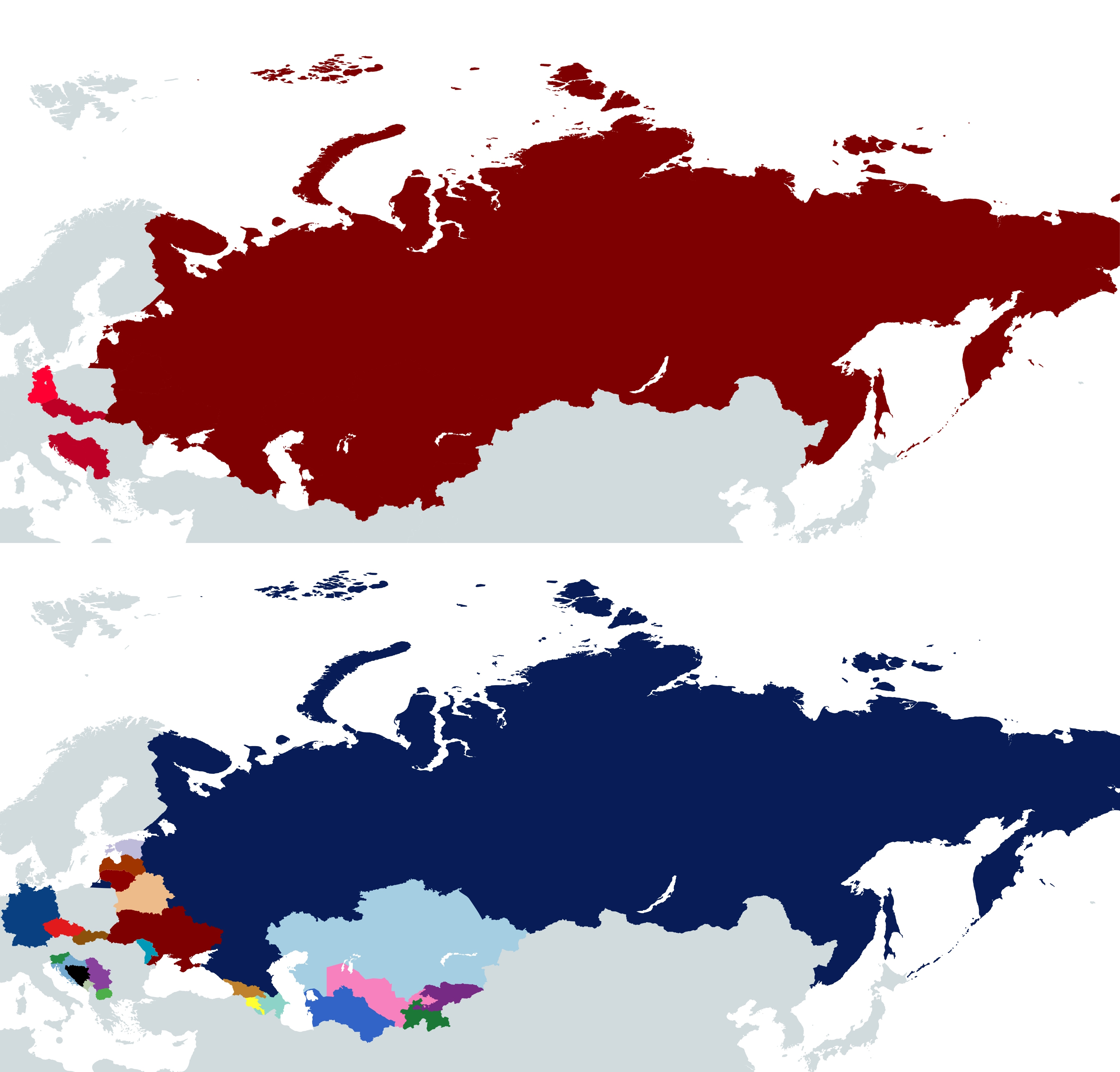
Changes in national boundaries after the collapse of the Eastern Bloc

Nineteenth-century Russian philosopher Nikolai Danilevsky defined Eurasia as an entity separate from Europe and Asia, bounded by the Himalayas, the Caucasus, the Alps, the Arctic, the Pacific, the Atlantic, the Mediterranean, the Black Sea and the Caspian Sea, a definition that has been influential in Russia and other parts of the former Soviet Union. Partly inspired by this usage, the term Eurasia is sometimes used to refer to the post-Soviet space – in particular Russia, the Central Asian republics, and the Transcaucasus republics – and sometimes also adjacent regions such as Turkey and Mongolia.

The word "Eurasia" is often used in Kazakhstan to describe its location. Numerous Kazakh institutions have the term in their names, like the L. N. Gumilev Eurasian National University (Kazakh: Л. Н. Гумилёв атындағы Еуразия Ұлттық университеті; Евразийский Национальный университет имени Л. Н. Гумилёва) (Lev Gumilev's Eurasianism ideas having been popularized in Kazakhstan by Olzhas Suleimenov), the Eurasian Media Forum, the Eurasian Cultural Foundation (Евразийский фонд культуры), the Eurasian Development Bank (Евразийский банк развития), and the Eurasian Bank. In 2007 Kazakhstan's president, Nursultan Nazarbayev, proposed building a "Eurasia Canal" to connect the Caspian Sea and the Black Sea via Russia's Kuma-Manych Depression to provide Kazakhstan and other Caspian-basin countries with a more efficient path to the ocean than the existing Volga–Don Canal.

This usage can also be seen in the names of Eurasianet, The Journal of Eurasian Studies, and the Association for Slavic, East European, and Eurasian Studies, as well as the titles of numerous academic programs at US universities.

This usage is comparable to how Americans use "Western Hemisphere" to describe concepts and organizations dealing with the Americas (e.g., Council on Hemispheric Affairs, Western Hemisphere Institute for Security Cooperation).

== See also ==
- Asia-Europe Foundation
- Asia–Europe Meeting
- Belt and Road Initiative
- Borders of the continents
- Council of Europe
- Community for Democracy and Rights of Nations
- Eastern European Group
- Eastern Partnership
- Eurasia (Nineteen Eighty-Four)
- Eurasian (disambiguation)
- Eurasian Economic Community
- Eurasia Tunnel
- Eurasia Canal
- Eurasian Economic Union
- European Union
- Euronest Parliamentary Assembly
- Federation of Euro-Asian Stock Exchanges
- Intermediate Region
- Laurasia – a geological supercontinent joining Eurasia and North America
- List of Eurasian countries by population
- Marmaray – railway tunnel links Europe to Asia
- Mongol Empire
- Organization of the Black Sea Economic Cooperation
- Organization for Security and Co-operation in Europe
- Palearctic
- Russian Empire
- Shanghai Cooperation Organisation
- Silk Road
- United States of Eurasia
- Vega expedition – the first voyage to circumnavigate Eurasia
