= List of sovereign states and dependent territories in the Indian Ocean =

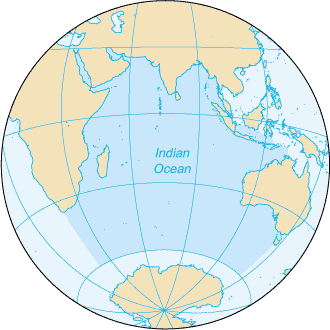
Extent of the Indian Ocean according to the International Hydrographic Organization

This list of sovereign states and dependent territories in the Indian Ocean consists of 38 countries, with 13 in Africa, 22 in Asia, and 1 in Oceania that either border on or are in the Indian Ocean, as well as 2 European countries which administer several dependencies or overseas territories in the region.

== Indian Ocean sovereign states and dependent territories ==
=== Asia-Pacific (17) ===
- Ashmore and Cartier Islands (AUS)
- Australia
- Bangladesh
- British Indian Ocean Territory (UK)
- Christmas Island (AUS)
- Cocos Islands (AUS)
- Heard Island and McDonald Islands (AUS)
- India
- Indonesia
- Malaysia
- Maldives
- Myanmar
- Pakistan
- Singapore
- Sri Lanka
- Thailand
- Timor-Leste

=== Middle East (12) ===
- Bahrain †
- Egypt ‡
- Iran †
- Iraq †
- Israel ‡
- Jordan ‡
- Kuwait †
- Oman
- Qatar †
- Saudi Arabia †‡
- United Arab Emirates †
- Yemen ‡

=== Sub-Saharan Africa (14) ===
- Comoros
- Djibouti ‡
- Egypt ‡
- Eritrea ‡
- France (Overseas territories: Mayotte — Réunion — French Southern and Antarctic Lands)
- Madagascar
- Mauritius
- Mozambique
- Seychelles
- Somalia
- Somaliland (nation state with limited international recognition — not a UN member)
- South Africa
- Sudan ‡
- Tanzania

† — states bordering the Persian Gulf
‡ — states bordering the Red Sea

== Sovereign states ==
The states listed in this table either border on or are in the Indian Ocean, which here includes the Red Sea and the Persian Gulf.

=== Recognised states ===
The following fully recognised states are all member states of the United Nations.

Flag	Coat of arms or National emblem	Map	English short name and formal name	Local short names and formal names	Capital	Population	Area in km^{2} (mi^{2})
			Australia Commonwealth of Australia	English: Australia — Commonwealth of Australia	Canberra	23,268,319	7,741,220 (2,988,900)
			Bahrain Kingdom of Bahrain	Arabic: مملكة البحرين – البحرين (Al Baḩrayn – Mamlakat al Baḩrayn)	Manama	1,569,446	760 (290)
			Bangladesh People's Republic of Bangladesh	Bengali: বাংলাদেশ – গণপ্রজাতন্ত্রী বাংলাদেশ (Bānglādesh – Gaṇaprajātantrī Bānglādesh)	Dhaka	161,376,708	147,570 (56,977)
			Comoros Union of the Comoros	Arabic: جزر القمر — جمهورية القمر المتحدة (Juzur al Qamar—Jumhūriyyat al Qamar al-Muttaḥidah) Comorian: Komori—Udzima wa Komori French: Comores—Union des Comores	Moroni, Comoros	832,322	2,235 (863)
			Djibouti Republic of Djibouti	Arabic: جيبوتي — جمهورية جيبوتي (Jibūti—Jumhūrīyat Jibūti) French: Djibouti—République de Djibouti	Djibouti City	958,923	23,200 (8,960)
			Egypt Arab Republic of Egypt	Arabic: مصر — جمهورية مصر العربية (Miṣr—Jumhūrīyat Miṣr alʿArabiyyah)	Cairo	98,423,598	1,001,449 (386,661)
			Eritrea State of Eritrea	Arabic: إرتريا — دولة إرتريا (ʾIritriyā—Dawlat ʾIritriyā) English: Eritrea—State of Eritrea Tigrinya: ኤርትራ — ሃገረ ኤርትራ (ʾErtra—Hagere ʾErtra)	Asmara	3,452,786	117,600 (45,410)
			India Republic of India	Hindi: भारत – भारत गणराज्य (Bhārat – Bhārat Gaṇarajya)	New Delhi	1,352,642,280	3,287,263 (1,269,219)
			Indonesia Republic of Indonesia	Indonesian: Indonesia – Republik Indonesia	Jakarta	267,670,543	1,904,569 (735,358)
			Iran Islamic Republic of Iran	Persian: جمهوری اسلامی ایران – ایران (Īrān – Jomhūrī-ye Eslāmī-ye Īrān)	Tehran	83,183,741	1,648,195 (636,371)
			Iraq Republic of Iraq	Arabic: العراق – جمهورية العراق (Al 'Irāq – Jumhūrīyat al 'Irāq)	Baghdad	38,433,600	438,317 (169,235)
			Israel State of Israel	Hebrew: יִשְרָאֵל – מְדִינַת יִשְׂרָאֵל (Yisra'el – Medinat Yisra'el) Arabic: إسرائيل – دَوْلَة إِسْرَائِيل (Isrā'īl – Dawlat Isrā'īl)	Jerusalem (claimed and de facto)	8,381,516	20,770 (8,019)
			Jordan Hashemite Kingdom of Jordan	Arabic: اﻷرُدن – المملكة الأردنية الهاشميه (Al Urdun – Al Mamlakah al Urdunīyah al Hāshimīyah)	Amman	9,965,318	89,342 (34,495)
			Kenya Republic of Kenya	English: Kenya—Republic of Kenya Swahili: Kenya—Jamhuri ya Kenya	Nairobi	51,392,565	580,367 (224,081)
			Kuwait State of Kuwait	Arabic: دولة الكويت – اﻟﻜﻮﻳت (Al Kuwayt – Dawlat al Kuwayt)	Kuwait City	4,137,312	17,818 (6,880)
			Madagascar Republic of Madagascar	French: Madagascar—République de Madagascar Malagasy: Repoblikan'i Madagasikara	Antananarivo	26,262,313	587,041 (226,658)
			Malaysia	Malaysian: Persekutuan Malaysia	Kuala Lumpur	31,528,033	329,847 (127,355)
			Maldives Republic of Maldives	Dhivehi: ދިވެހިރާއްޖެ – ދިވެހިރާއްޖޭގެ ޖުމްހޫރިއްޔާ (Dhivehi Raajje – Dhivehi Raajjeyge Jumhooriyyaa)	Malé	515,696	298 (115)
			Mauritius Republic of Mauritius	English: Mauritius—Republic of Mauritius French: Maurice—République de Maurice Mauritian Creole: Moris—Repiblik Moris	Port Louis	1,267,185	2,040 (788)
			Mozambique Republic of Mozambique	Portuguese: Moçambique—República de Moçambique	Maputo	29,496,004	801,590 (309,500)
			Myanmar Republic of the Union of Myanmar	Burmese: မြန်မာ – ပြည်ထောင်စု သမ္မတ မြန်မာနိုင်ငံတော် (Myanma – Pyidaungzu Myanma Naingngandaw)	Naypyidaw	53,708,320	676,578 (261,228)
			Oman Sultanate of Oman	Arabic: عُمان – سلطنة عُمان ('Umān – Salţanat 'Umān)	Muscat	4,829,473	309,500 (119,500)
			Pakistan Islamic Republic of Pakistan	English: Pakistan – Islamic Republic of Pakistan Urdu: پَاکِسْتَان – اسلامی جمہوریہ پاکستان (Pākistān — Islāmī Jamhūrīyah-e-Pākistān)	Islamabad	212,228,286	881,913 (340,508)
			Qatar State of Qatar	Arabic: قطر – دولة قطر (Qatar – Dawlat Qatar)	Doha	2,781,682	11,586 (4,473)
			Saudi Arabia Kingdom of Saudi Arabia	Arabic: السعودية – المملكة العربية السعودية (As Su‘ūdīyah – Al Mamlakah al ‘Arabīyah as Su‘ūdīyah)	Riyadh	33,702,756	2,149,690 (830,000)
			Seychelles Republic of Seychelles	English: Seychelles—Republic of Seychelles French: Seychelles—République des Seychelles Seychellois Creole: Sesel—Repiblik Sesel	Victoria	97,096	451 (174)
			Singapore Republic of Singapore	Chinese: 新加坡 – 新加坡共和国 (Xīnjiāpō – Xīnjiāpō Gònghéguó) English: Singapore – Republic of Singapore Malay: Singapura – Republik Singapura Tamil: சிங்கப்பூர் – சிங்கப்பூர் குடியரசு (Chiṅkappūr – Chiṅkappūr Kuṭiyarachu)	Singapore	5,757,499	697 (269)
			Sri Lanka Democratic Socialist Republic of Sri Lanka	Sinhala: ශ්‍රී ලංකාව – ශ්‍රී ලංකා ප්‍රජාතාන්ත්‍රික සමාජවාදී ජනරජය (Shrī Laṁkā – Shrī Laṁkā Prajātāntrika Samājavādī Janarajaya) Tamil: இலங்கை – இலங்கை ஜனநாயக சமத்துவ குடியரசு (Ilaṅkai – Ilaṅkai Jaṉanāyaka Choṣhalichak Kuṭiyarachu)	Sri Jayawardenepura Kotte	21,228,763	65,610 (25,330)
			Somalia Federal Republic of Somalia	Arabic: الصومال — جمهورية الصومال الفيدرالية (Aṣ Ṣomāl—Jumhūriyyah aṣ Ṣomāl al Fīdrāliyyah) Somali: Jamhuuriyadda Federaalka Soomaaliya	Mogadishu	15,008,226	637,657 (246,201)
			South Africa Republic of South Africa	Afrikaans: Suid-Afrika—Republiek van Suid-Afrika 10 other official names: English: South Africa—Republic of South Africa; Tsonga: Afrika Dzonga—Riphabliki ra Afrika Dzonga; Tswana: Aforika Borwa—Rephaboliki ya Aforika Borwa; Southern Ndebele: Sewula Afrika—iRiphabliki yeSewula Afrika; Northern Sotho: Afrika-Borwa—Repabliki ya Afrika-Borwa; (Southern) Sotho: Afrika Borwa—Rephaboliki ya Afrika Borwa; Swati: Ningizimu Afrika—iRiphabhulikhi yeNingizimu Afrika; Xhosa: uMzantsi Afrika—iRiphabliki yomZantsi Afrika; Venda: Afurika Tshipembe—Riphabuḽiki ya Afurika Tshipembe; Zulu: Ningizimu Afrika—iRiphabhuliki yaseNingizimu Afrika	Bloemfontein (judicial), Cape Town (legislative), and Pretoria (executive)	57,792,518	1,221,037 (471,445)
			Sudan Republic of the Sudan	Arabic: السودان — جمهورية السودان (As Sūdān—Jumhūriyyah as Sūdān) English: Republic of the Sudan	Khartoum	41,801,533	1,861,484 (718,723)
			Tanzania United Republic of Tanzania	English: Tanzania—United Republic of Tanzania Swahili: Tanzania—Jamhuri ya Muungano wa Tanzania	Dodoma (official) Dar es Salaam (seat of government)	56,313,438	945,203 (364,945)
			Thailand Kingdom of Thailand	Thai: ไทย – ราชอาณาจักรไทย (Thai – Ratcha Anachak Thai)	Bangkok	69,428,453	513,120 (198,120)
			Timor-Leste Democratic Republic of Timor-Leste	Portuguese: Timor-Leste – República Democrática de Timor-Leste Tetum: Timor Lorosa'e – Repúblika Demokrátika Timor Lorosa'e	Dili	1,267,974	14,874 (5,743)
			United Arab Emirates	Arabic: اﻹﻣﺎرات – دولة الإمارات العربية المتحدة (Al Imārāt – Al Imārāt al 'Arabīyah al Muttaḩidah)	Abu Dhabi	9,630,959	83,600 (32,300)
			Yemen Republic of Yemen	Arabic: اليمن – الجمهورية اليمنية (Al Yaman – Al Jumhūrīyah al Yamanīyah)	Sana'a (de jure)	28,498,683	527,968 (203,850)

=== States with limited or no international recognition ===
The entity listed below has declared itself to be a sovereign state and exercises control over some territory but has limited or no recognition from other states and is not a member state of the United Nations.

Flag	Coat of Arms or National Emblem	Map	English Short Name and Formal Name	Status	Local Short Name(s) and Formal Name(s)	Capital	Population	Area
			Somaliland Republic of Somaliland	State not controlled by Somalia Recognized by 1 UN member	Arabic: جمهورية أرض الصومال — أرض الصومال (Jumhūrīyat Arḍ aṣ-Ṣūmāl) Somali: Jamhuuriyadda Somaliland	Hargeisa	4,000,000	176,120 km^{2} (68,000 sq mi)

== Constituent parts of sovereign states ==
Flag	Coat of Arms or Territorial Emblem	Map	English Short Name and Formal Name	Status	Local Short Name(s) and Formal Name(s)	Capital	Population	Area
			Andaman and Nicobar Islands Union Territory of the Andaman and Nicobar Islands	Union Territory of India	English: Andaman and Nicobar Islands — Union Territory of the Andaman and Nicobar Islands Hindi: अंडमान व निकोबार द्वीप समूह — केंद्र शासित प्रदेश अंडमान और निकोबार द्वीप समूह (Andamaan Aur Nikobaar Dveep Samooh — Kendr Shaasit Pradesh Andamaan Aur Nikobaar Dveep Samooh)	Port Blair	380,520	8,250 km^{2} (3,190 sq mi)
			French Southern and Antarctic Lands	Overseas Territory and constituent part of the French Republic	French: Terres australes et antarctiques françaises	Saint-Pierre	No permanent population 200~400 scientists and military personnel	439,666.4 km^{2} (169,756.1 sq mi)
			Lakshadweep Union Territory of Lakshadweep	Union Territory of India	English: Lakshadweep — Union Territory of Lakshadweep Malayalam: ലക്ഷദ്വീപ് — കേന്ദ്രഭരണ പ്രദേശമായ ലക്ഷദ്വീപ് (Lakṣadvīp — Kēndrabharaṇa Pradēśamāya Lakṣadvīp)	Kavarrati	70,365	32.62 km^{2} (12.59 sq mi)
			Mayotte Mayotte Region	Overseas Region and constituent part of the French Republic	French: Mayotte — Région Mayotte	Mamoudzou	266,380	374 km^{2} (144 sq mi)
			Phuket Phuket Province	Province of Thailand	Thai: ภูเก็ต — ภูเก็ต จังหวัด (Phuket — Phuket Changwat)	Phuket	416,582	543 km^{2} (210 sq mi)
			Prince Edward Islands	Territory of South Africa	English: Prince Edward Islands	Uninhabited	Uninhabited	335 km^{2} (129 sq mi)
			Réunion Reunion Region	Overseas Department of France	French: La Réunion — Région Réunion	Saint-Denis	859,959	2,511 km^{2} (970 sq mi)
			Zanzibar Republic of Zanzibar	Semi-autonomous Region of Tanzania	Arabic: زنجبار — جمهورية زنجبار (Zinjibār — Jumhūrīyat Zinjibār) English: Zanzibar — Republic of Zanzibar Swahili: Zanzibar — Jamhuri ya Zanzibar	Zanzibar City	1,303,569	2,462 km^{2} (951 sq mi)

== Dependent territories of sovereign states ==
Flag	Coat of Arms or Territorial Emblem	Map	English Short Name and Formal Name	Status	Local Short Name(s) and Formal Name(s)	Capital	Population	Area
			Ashmore and Cartier Islands Territory of Ashmore and Cartier Islands	External Territory of Australia	English: Ashmore and Cartier Islands — Territory of Ashmore and Cartier Islands	Uninhabited	Uninhabited	5 km^{2} (2 sq mi)
			British Indian Ocean Territory	British Overseas Territory	English: British Indian Ocean Territory	Camp Justice	Non-Permanent: 3,000 military personnel Permanent: 0	60 km^{2} (23 sq mi)
			Christmas Island	External Territory of Australia	English: Christmas Island Chinese: 圣诞岛 — 圣诞岛领地 Malay: Pulau Krismas — Wilayah Pulau Krismas	Flying Fish Cove	1,843	135 km^{2} (52 sq mi)
			Cocos (Keeling) Islands	External Territory of Australia	English: Cocos (Keeling) Islands — Territory of Cocos (Keeling) Islands Malay: Kepulauan Cocos (Keeling) — Wilayah Kepulauan Cocos (Keeling) Cocos Islands Malay: Pulu Kokos (Keeling)	West Island	544	14 km^{2} (5.4 sq mi)
			Heard Island and McDonald Islands Territory of Heard Island and McDonald Islands	External Territory of Australia	English: Heard Island and McDonald Islands — Territory of Heard Island and McDonald Islands	Uninhabited	Uninhabited	368 km^{2} (142 sq mi)

== See also ==
- Indian Ocean Rim
- List of Antarctic and subantarctic islands
- List of Caribbean countries by population
- List of island countries
- List of islands in the Indian Ocean
- List of islands of Africa
- List of sovereign states and dependent territories in Oceania
