= List of predecessors of sovereign states in Oceania =

This is a list of all present sovereign states in Oceania and their predecessors. The region of Oceania is generally defined geographically to include the subregions of Australasia, Melanesia, Micronesia and Polynesia, and their respective sovereign states. Oceania was originally colonised by Europeans with Australia and New Zealand primarily by the British, and the Pacific Islands primarily by the British, French and Dutch. Today, Oceania consists of fourteen sovereign states of various government types, the most common consisting of parliamentary systems.

Sovereign state	Predecessors
Australia	British Colonial Period Colony of New South Wales (1788–1901) Van Diemen's Land Colony (1825–1856), later Colony of Tasmania (1856–1901) Swan River Colony (1829–1832), later Colony of Western Australia (1832–1901) Province of South Australia (1836–1901) Victoria Colony (1851–1901) Colony of Queensland (1859–1901) Commonwealth of Australia (1901–present)
Fiji	Kingdom of Fiji (1871–1874); Colony of Fiji (1874–1970); Dominion of Fiji (1970–1987); Republic of Fiji (1987–present)
Kiribati	Gilbert and Ellice Islands Colony (1892–1975); Colony of Gilbert Islands (1975–1979); Independent and Sovereign Republic of Kiribati (1979–present)
Marshall Islands	German New Guinea (1884–1919); South Pacific Mandate (1919–1947); Trust Territory of the Pacific Islands (1947–1994) (Marshall Islands participation until 1979); Republic of the Marshall Islands (1979–present)
Federated States of Micronesia	Spanish East Indies (1565–1898); German New Guinea (1884–1919); South Pacific Mandate (1919–1947); Trust Territory of the Pacific Islands (1947–1994) (FSM participation until 1979); Federated States of Micronesia (1979–present)
Nauru	German New Guinea (1884–1919) (participation 1888–1914); Nauru (1914–1942) (League of Nations mandate 1932–1942); Japanese occupation of Nauru (1942–1945); Nauru (1945–1968) (UN Trust Territory 1947–1968); Republic of Nauru (1968–present)
New Zealand	Colony of New South Wales (1788–1901) (NZ participation 1788–1841); Colony of New Zealand (1841–1907); Dominion of New Zealand (1907–1947); New Zealand (1947–present)
Palau	Spanish East Indies (1565–1898); German New Guinea (1884–1919); South Pacific Mandate (1919–1947); Trust Territory of the Pacific Islands (1947–1994); Republic of Palau (1994–present)
Papua New Guinea	Territory of Papua (1884–1975) and German New Guinea (1884–1919), later Territory of New Guinea (1919–1975) (League of Nations mandate, later UN Trust Territory); Territory of Papua and New Guinea (1949–1975) (administrative union between Territory of Papua and Territory of New Guinea); Independent State of Papua New Guinea (1975–present)
Samoa	German Samoa (1900–1920); Western Samoa Trust Territory (1920–1962) (League of Nations mandate of Britain, later UN Trust Territory of New Zealand) Independent State of Western Samoa (1962–1997); Independent State of Samoa (1997–present)
Solomon Islands	German New Guinea (1884–1919) (Solomon Islands participation 1884–1893); British Solomon Islands (1893–1978); Solomon Islands (1978–present)
Tonga	Tu'i Tonga Empire (950s–1865) Kingdom of Tonga (1845–present) (British protectorate 1900–1970)
Tuvalu	Gilbert and Ellice Islands Colony (1892–1975); Colony of Tuvalu (1975–1978); Tuvalu (1978–present)
Vanuatu	Anglo-French Joint Naval Commission (1887–1889); Independent Commune of Franceville (1889–1890) (unrecognised state); Anglo-French Joint Naval Commission (1890–1906); New Hebrides Condominium (1906–1980); Republic of Vanuatu (1980–present)

== See also ==
- Federation of Australia
- List of sovereign states and dependent territories in Oceania
- Succession of states
