= List of Eurasian countries by population =

Eurasia location map - Political

This is a list of Eurasian countries and dependent territories by population, which is sorted by the 2015 mid-year normalized demographic projections.

== Table ==
Rank	Country (or dependent territory)	July 1, 2015 projection	% of pop.	Average relative annual growth (%)	Average absolute annual growth	Estimated doubling time (Years)	Official figure (where available)	Date of last figure	Source
1	China	1,370,793,000	26.82	0.49	6,730,000	141	1,439,200,000	October 11, 2025	Official population clock
2	India	1,200,499,000	25.43	1.64	20,998,000	43	1,210,854,977	March 1, 2011	Final 2011 census result
3	Indonesia	255,462,000	5.00	1.41	3,549,000	50	255,461,700	2015	Official estimate
4	Pakistan	201,785,000	3.75	2.00	3,765,000	35	225,285,000	October 11, 2025	Official population clock
5	Bangladesh	158,762,000	3.11	1.37	2,139,000	51	180,449,000	October 11, 2025	Official population clock
6	Russia	144,031,000	2.82	0.17	250,000	399	146,267,288	January 1, 2015	Official estimate
7	Japan	126,891,000	2.48	-0.01	-12,000	-	126,890,000	November 1, 2015	Monthly official estimate
8	Philippines	102,965,000	2.01	2.13	2,147,000	33	102,965,300	2015	Official estimate
9	Vietnam	91,812,000	1.80	1.16	1,057,000	60	90,493,352	April 1, 2014	Official estimate
10	Germany	82,800,000	1.59	1.20	600,000	90	82,800,000	December 31, 2016	Official estimate
11	Iran	78,778,000	1.54	1.29	1,001,000	54	87,719,000	October 11, 2025	Official population clock
12	Turkey	78,214,000	1.53	1.34	1,035,000	52	77,695,904	December 31, 2014	Official estimate
13	Thailand	68,387,000	1.34	0.76	517,000	91	65,926,261	September 1, 2010	2010 census result
14	United Kingdom	65,093,000	1.27	0.77	495,000	91	64,596,800	June 30, 2014	Official estimate
15	France	64,295,000	1.26	0.45	288,000	154	66,518,000	November 1, 2015	Monthly official estimate
16	Italy	60,851,000	1.19	0.48	290,000	145	60,690,345	July 31, 2015	Monthly official estimate
17	Myanmar	52,280,000	1.02	1.22	632,000	57	51,486,253	March 29, 2014	2014 census result
18	South Korea	50,617,000	0.99	0.38	193,000	181	50,617,045	2015	Official estimate
19	Spain	46,404,000	0.91	-0.15	-72,000	-	46,439,864	January 1, 2015	Official estimate
20	Ukraine	42,823,000	0.84	-0.37	-160,000	-	42,630,864	October 1, 2015	Monthly official estimate
21	Poland	38,494,000	0.75	0.05	20,000	1,334	38,484,000	December 31, 2014	Official estimate
22	Iraq	36,575,000	0.72	2.90	1,030,000	24	36,575,000	2015	Official estimate
23	Saudi Arabia	31,521,000	0.62	2.44	751,000	29	31,521,418	2015	Official estimate
24	Uzbekistan	31,283,000	0.61	1.70	523,000	41	31,022,500	January 1, 2015	Official estimate
25	Malaysia	31,032,000	0.61	1.84	561,000	38	36,341,000	October 11, 2025	Official population clock
26	Nepal	28,038,000	0.55	1.42	392,000	49	28,037,904	2015	Official estimate
27	Afghanistan	26,849,000	0.53	1.87	494,000	37	27,101,365	January 1, 2016	Official estimate
28	Yemen	26,745,000	0.52	2.95	766,000	24	24,527,000	July 1, 2012	Official estimate
29	North Korea	25,863,000	0.51	1.08	277,000	64	24,052,231	October 1, 2008	Final 2008 census result
30	Taiwan	23,455,000	0.46	0.35	81,000	200	23,476,640	October 31, 2015	Monthly official estimate
31	Syria	23,270,000	0.46	2.45	557,000	29	21,377,000	December 31, 2011	Official estimate
32	Sri Lanka	20,869,000	0.41	0.94	194,000	74	20,771,000	July 1, 2014	Official estimate
33	Romania	19,822,000	0.39	-0.41	-81,000	-	19,942,642	January 1, 2014	Official estimate
34	Kazakhstan	18,688,640	0.34	1.45	250,000	48	17,608,200	April 25, 2020	Monthly official estimate
35	Netherlands	16,924,000	0.33	0.36	60,000	195	17,658,200	October 11, 2025	Official population clock
36	Cambodia	15,040,000	0.29	1.59	236,000	44	13,395,682	March 3, 2008	Final 2008 census result
37	Belgium	11,253,000	0.22	0.51	57,000	136	11,280,134	October 1, 2015	Monthly official estimate
38	Greece	10,769,000	0.21	-0.11	-12,000	-	11,533,492	2016	Official estimate
39	Czech Republic	10,536,000	0.21	-0.06	-6,000	-	10,541,466	June 30, 2015	Official estimate
40	Portugal	10,318,000	0.20	-0.55	-57,000	-	10,374,822	2014	Official estimate
41	Sweden	10,196,177	0.19	-0.28	-28,000	-	9,855,571	August 31, 2018	Official estimate
42	Hungary	9,793,000	0.19	0.95	92,000	73	9,828,655	September 30, 2015	Monthly official estimate
43	Azerbaijan	9,651,000	0.19	1.23	117,000	57	9,593,000	January 1, 2015	Official estimate
44	Belarus	9,485,000	0.19	0.08	8,000	821	9,494,200	October 1, 2015	Official estimate
45	United Arab Emirates	8,933,000	0.17	1.57	138,000	45	8,264,070	2010	Official estimate
46	Austria	8,623,000	0.17	0.71	61,000	98	8,662,588	October 1, 2015	Official estimate
47	Tajikistan	8,451,000	0.17	2.35	194,000	30	8,354,000	January 1, 2015	Official estimate
48	Israel	8,372,000	0.16	1.89	155,000	37	8,436,600	October 31, 2015	Monthly official estimate
49	Switzerland	8,274,000	0.16	0.88	72,000	79	8,279,700	June 30, 2015	Official estimate
50	Hong Kong (China)	7,299,000	0.14	0.90	65,000	77	7,298,600	July 1, 2015	Official estimate
51	Bulgaria	7,181,000	0.14	-0.60	-43,000	-	7,202,198	December 31, 2014	Official estimate
52	Serbia	7,100,000	0.14	-0.41	-29,000	-	7,114,393	January 1, 2015	Official estimate
53	Jordan	6,837,000	0.13	2.75	183,000	26	6,388,000	2012	Official estimate
54	Laos	6,802,000	0.13	1.63	109,000	43	6,809,054	2014	Official estimate
55	Kyrgyzstan	5,943,000	0.12	1.64	96,000	43	5,895,100	January 1, 2015	Official estimate
56	Denmark	5,678,000	0.11	0.48	27,000	145	5,699,220	October 1, 2015	Official estimate
57	Singapore	5,541,000	0.11	1.30	71,000	54	5,535,000	July 1, 2015	Official estimate
58	Finland	5,477,000	0.11	0.46	25,000	152	5,485,210	October 31, 2015	Monthly official estimate
59	Slovakia	5,425,000	0.11	0.13	7,000	537	5,421,329	December 31, 2014	Official estimate
60	Norway	5,189,000	0.10	0.91	47,000	76	5,205,434	October 1, 2015	Official estimate
61	Turkmenistan	4,902,000	0.10	1.24	60,000	56	4,751,120	December 26, 2012	2012 census result
62	Palestine	4,683,000	0.09	2.92	133,000	24	4,550,368	2014	Official estimate
63	Ireland	4,630,000	0.09	0.35	16,000	200	4,635,400	April 2015	Official estimate
64	Lebanon	4,288,000	0.08	1.78	75,000	39	4,965,846	December 31, 2013	Official estimate
65	Croatia	4,230,000	0.08	-0.31	-13,000	-	4,267,558	July 1, 2012	Official estimate
66	Oman	4,181,000	0.08	5.13	204,000	14	5,007,200	October 11, 2025	Official population clock
67	Kuwait	4,161,000	0.08	3.00	121,000	23	4,183,658	June 30, 2015	Official estimate
68	Bosnia and Herzegovina	3,750,000	0.07	-0.64	-24,000	-	3,791,622	October 1, 2013	Preliminary 2013 census result
69	Georgia	3,730,000	0.07	0.03	1,000	2,585	3,729,500	January 1, 2015	Official estimate
70	Moldova	3,564,000	0.07	0.48	17,000	145	3,555,200	January 1, 2015	Official estimate
71	Mongolia	3,029,000	0.06	2.19	65,000	32	3,555,200	October 11, 2025	Official population clock
72	Armenia	3,005,000	0.06	-0.03	-1,000	-	3,004,000	September 30, 2015	Monthly official estimate
73	Lithuania	2,903,000	0.06	-0.92	-27,000	-			
74	Albania	2,887,000	0.06	-0.41	-12,000	-	2,893,005	January 1, 2015	Official estimate
75	Qatar	2,113,000	0.04	4.29	87,000	16	2,412,483	October 31, 2015	Monthly official estimate
76	North Macedonia	2,071,000	0.04	0.19	4,000	359	2,069,172	December 31, 2014	Official estimate
77	Slovenia	2,064,000	0.04	0.15	3,000	477	2,062,874	January 1, 2015	Official estimate
78	Latvia	1,980,000	0.04	-0.85	-17,000	-	1,973,700	November 1, 2015	Monthly official estimate
79	Kosovo	1,867,000	0.04	1.08	20,000	64	1,815,606	December 31, 2012	Official estimate
80	Bahrain	1,781,000	0.03	7.35	122,000	10	1,234,571	April 27, 2010	Final 2010 census result
81	Estonia	1,315,000	0.03	0.46	6,000	152	1,313,271	January 1, 2015	Official estimate
82	Timor-Leste	1,245,000	0.02	2.72	33,000	26	1,167,242	July 11, 2015	Preliminary 2015 census result
83	Cyprus	846,000	0.02	-0.94	-8,000	-	858,000	December 31, 2013	Official estimate
84	Bhutan	760,000	0.01	1.74	13,000	40	909,120	October 11, 2025	Official population clock
85	Macao (China)	641,000	0.01	3.89	24,000	18	643,100	September 2015	Official estimate
86	Montenegro	620,000	0.01	0.00	0	-	620,029	April 1, 2011	2011 census result
87	Luxembourg	570,000	0.01	2.52	14,000	28	562,958	December 31, 2014	Official estimate
88	Malta	425,000	0.01	0.47	2,000	147	417,432	November 20, 2011	2011 census result
89	Brunei	421,000	0.01	1.69	7,000	41	393,372	June 20, 2011	Preliminary 2011 census result
90	Maldives	345,000	0.01	1.47	5,000	47	344,023	September 20, 2014	Preliminary 2014 census result
91	Iceland	331,000	0.01	1.22	4,000	57	329,100	January 1, 2015	Official estimate
92	Jersey (UK)	103,000	0.00	0.98	1,000	71	97,857	March 27, 2011	2011 census result
93	Isle of Man (UK)	89,000	0.00	1.14	1,000	61	84,497	March 27, 2011	2011 census result
94	Andorra	78,000	0.00	1.30	1,000	54	76,949	2014	Official estimate
95	Guernsey (UK)	66,000	0.00	1.54	1,000	45	65,150	March 31, 2014	Official estimate
96	Faroe Islands (Denmark)	49,000	0.00	0.00	0	-	49,006	October 1, 2015	Monthly official estimate
97	Monaco	38,000	0.00	0.00	0	-	37,800	December 31, 2014	Official estimate
98	Liechtenstein	37,000	0.00	0.00	0	-	37,370	December 31, 2014	Official estimate
99	Gibraltar (UK)	33,000	0.00	0.00	0	-	32,734	December 31, 2013	Official estimate
100	San Marino	33,000	0.00	0.00	0	-	32,937	October 31, 2015	Monthly official estimate
101	Åland Islands (Finland)	29,000	0.00	0.00	0	-	28,916	December 31, 2014	Official estimate
102	Svalbard and Jan Mayen (Norway)	3,000	0.00	0.00	0	-	2,575	July 1, 2014	Official estimate
103	Vatican City	800	0.00	0.00	0	-	800	2015	Official estimate
	Total	5,111,000,800	100.00	1.06	53,496,000	66			

== See also ==
- List of Asian countries by population
- List of European countries by population
- List of sovereign states and dependent territories in Eurasia
