= List of sovereign states and dependent territories in Oceania =

Exclusive economic zones of Oceania and neighboring areas

This is a list of sovereign states and dependent territories in the geographical region of Oceania. Although it is mostly ocean and spans many tectonic plates, Oceania is occasionally listed as one of the continents.

Most of this list follows the boundaries of geopolitical Oceania, which includes Australasia, Melanesia, Micronesia, and Polynesia. The main continental landmass of Oceania is Australia.

== Boundaries of Oceania ==
The boundary between Southeast Asia and Oceania is not clearly defined. For political reasons, the United Nations considers the boundary between the two regions to be the Indonesian–Papua New Guinean border. Papua New Guinea is occasionally considered Asian as it neighbours Indonesia, but this is rare, and it is generally accepted to be part of Oceania. Geologically, the six Indonesian provinces in Western New Guinea and Aru Islands in Maluku Province are parts of the Australian continental shelf. Biogeographically, the Wallace line separates Asia from Wallacea, a transitional zone, while the Lydekker line separates it from Australia. Weber Line is the midpoint, at which Asian and Australian fauna and flora are approximately equally represented.

Likewise, there is also no clearly defined boundary between Latin America and Oceania; the mostly uninhabited oceanic Pacific islands near Latin America have been considered by some as part of Oceania, both historically and in present-day times. Nearly all of these islands have become politically associated with the Americas, but none lie on the respective tectonic plates of those continents, nor were any inhabited by Indigenous peoples of the Americas during the pre-Columbian era. Some share strong biogeographical affinities to geopolitical Oceania. The Malay Archipelago has historically been associated with Oceania, however, very few present-day definitions include it as part of Oceania. The Malay Archipelago lies on the continental shelf of Asia; Christmas Island and Cocos (Keeling) Islands (both adjacent to the Malay Archipelago) lie on the Australian tectonic plate, and are not politically associated with Asia. The Bonin Islands, which have been politically integrated into Japan, are not geologically associated with the Asian continent, and are biogeographically within Micronesia.

== Sovereign states ==
=== United Nations member states ===
This section includes all sovereign states located predominantly in Oceania that are member states of the United Nations. All 14 states are full members of the Pacific Islands Forum.

| Flag | Coat of Arms / National Emblem | Map | English short, formal names, and ISO | Domestic short and formal name(s) | Capital | Population 2021 | Area |
|---|---|---|---|---|---|---|---|
| | | | Australia (Note: Australia has two external territories in the Antarctic, the Heard Island and McDonald Islands and the claimed Australian Antarctic Territory.) Commonwealth of Australia AUS | English: Australia — Commonwealth of Australia | Canberra | 25,921,089 | 7,741,220 km^{2} (2,988,902 sq mi) |
| | | | Fiji Republic of Fiji FJI | English: Fiji — Republic of Fiji Fijian: Viti — Matanitu ko Viti Fiji Hindi: फीजी/Fiji - रिपब्लिक ऑफ फीजी/ Ripablik ăph Phījī | Suva | 924,610 | 18,274 km^{2} (7,056 sq mi) |
| | | | Kiribati Republic of Kiribati KIR | English: Kiribati — Republic of Kiribati Gilbertese: Kiribati — Ribaberiki Kiribati | South Tarawa Bairiki | 128,874 | 811 km^{2} (313 sq mi) |
| | | | Marshall Islands Republic of the Marshall Islands MHL | English: Marshall Islands — Republic of the Marshall Islands Marshallese: Aelōn̄ in M̧ajeļ - Aolepān Aorōkin M̧ajeļ | Majuro | 42,050 | 181 km^{2} (70 sq mi) |
| | | | Federated States of Micronesia FSM | English: Federated States of Micronesia | Palikir | 113,131 | 702 km^{2} (271 sq mi) |
| | | | Nauru Republic of Naoero NRU | English: Nauru — Republic of Naoero Nauruan: Naoero - Repubrikin Naoero | No official Capital Government offices are in Yaren | 10,834 | 21 km^{2} (8 sq mi) |
| | | | New Zealand (Note: New Zealand has five island groups in the Subantarctic. New Zealand claims territory in the Antarctic as the Ross Dependency.) NZL | English: New Zealand Māori: Aotearoa | Wellington | 5,129,727 | 267,710 km^{2} (103,363 sq mi) |
| | | | Palau Republic of Palau PLW | English: Palau — Republic of Palau Palauan: Belau — Beluu er a Belau | Ngerulmud | 18,024 | 459 km^{2} (177 sq mi) |
| | | | Papua New Guinea Independent State of Papua New Guinea PNG | English: Papua New Guinea — Independent State of Papua New Guinea Tok Pisin: Papua Niugini — Independen Stet bilong Papua Niugini | Port Moresby | 9,949,437 | 462,840 km^{2} (178,704 sq mi) |
| | | | Samoa Independent State of Samoa WSM | English: Samoa — Independent State of Samoa Samoan: Samoa — Malo Sa'oloto Tuto'atasi o Samoa | Apia | 218,764 | 2,831 km^{2} (1,093 sq mi) |
| | | | Solomon Islands SLB | English: Solomon Islands Pijin: Solomon Aelan | Honiara | 707,851 | 28,896 km^{2} (11,157 sq mi) |
| | | | Tonga Kingdom of Tonga TON | English: Tonga — Kingdom of Tonga Tongan: Tonga — Pule'anga Tonga | Nukuʻalofa | 106,017 | 747 km^{2} (288 sq mi) |
| | | | Tuvalu TUV | English: Tuvalu Tuvaluan: Tuvalu | Funafuti | 11,204 | 26 km^{2} (10 sq mi) |
| | | | Vanuatu Republic of Vanuatu VUT | Bislama: Vanuatu — Ripablik blong Vanuatu English: Vanuatu — Republic of Vanuatu French: Vanuatu — République de Vanuatu | Port Vila | 319,137 | 12,189 km^{2} (4,706 sq mi) |

=== Associated states ===
Two states, the Cook Islands and Niue, are in free association with New Zealand. While maintaining a close constitutional and political relationship with New Zealand, both states have full treaty-making capacity and are members of several United Nations specialized agencies. Both independently engage in diplomatic relations with sovereign states under their own name, and are full members of the Pacific Islands Forum. Because of these features, both act in many ways as fully independent states.

| Flag | Coat of Arms / National Emblem | Map | English short and formal names | Status | Domestic short and formal names | Capital | Population | Area |
|---|---|---|---|---|---|---|---|---|
| | | | Cook Islands | Self-governing in free association with New Zealand. It shares a head of state with New Zealand as well as having shared citizenship, but is independent in its internal affairs. | English: Cook Islands; Cook Islands Māori: Kūki 'Āirani | Avarua | 11,124 | 236 km^{2} (91 sq mi) |
| | | | Niue | Self-governing in free association with New Zealand. It shares a head of state with New Zealand as well as having shared citizenship, but is independent in its internal affairs. | English: Niue Niuean: Niuē | Alofi | 1,311 | 260 km^{2} (100 sq mi) |

== Non-sovereign territories ==
The following are entities considered to be within Oceania that fall into one of these categories:

1. Federal territories of sovereign states located outside these states' mainland.

2. Territories that constitute integral parts of sovereign states in some form other than as federal territories, where a significant part of the sovereign state's landmass is located outside Oceania or the territory is located outside the sovereign state's mainland. Many of these territories are often described as dependencies or autonomous areas.

3. Dependent territories of sovereign states.

Two of these territories (French Polynesia and New Caledonia) are associate members of the Pacific Islands Forum, while five others (American Samoa, Guam, Northern Mariana Islands, Tokelau, and Wallis and Futuna) hold observer status within the organization.

| Flag | Coat of Arms / National Emblem | Map | English short and formal names | Status | Domestic short and formal names | Capital | Population | Area |
|---|---|---|---|---|---|---|---|---|
| | | | American Samoa Territory of American Samoa | Unincorporated territory of the United States | English: American Samoa — Territory of American Samoa Samoan: Amerika Sāmoa | Pago Pago | 67,242 | 199 km^{2} (77 sq mi) |
| | | | Ashmore and Cartier Islands Territory of Ashmore and Cartier Islands | External territory of Australia | English: Ashmore and Cartier Islands | None | Uninhabited | 5 km^{2} (2 sq mi) |
| | | | Baker Island | Unincorporated territory of the United States | English: Baker Island | None | Uninhabited | 129.1 km^{2} (49.8 sq mi) |
| | | | Central Papua Central Papua Province | Province of Indonesia | Indonesian: Papua Tengah | Nabire Regency | 1,408,981 | 66,130.49 km^{2} (25,533 sq mi) |
| | | | Christmas Island | External territory of Australia | English: Christmas Island – Territory of Christmas Island | Flying Fish Cove / The Settlement | 1,843 | 135 km^{2} (52 sq mi) |
| | | | Clipperton Island | Overseas state private property | French: Île de Clipperton | None | Uninhabited | 6 km^{2} (2 sq mi) |
| | | | Cocos (Keeling) Islands | External territory of Australia | English: Cocos (Keeling) Islands – Territory of the Cocos (Keeling) Islands | West Island / Bantam | 544 | 14 km^{2} (5 sq mi) |
| | | | Coral Sea Islands Coral Sea Islands Territory | External territory of Australia | English: Coral Sea Islands — Coral Sea Islands Territory | Willis Island | Uninhabited | 3 km^{2} (1 sq mi) |
| | | | Easter Island | Special territory of Chile | Spanish: Isla de Pascua Rapa Nui: Rapa Nui | Hanga Roa | 6,148 | 163.6 km^{2} (63 sq mi) |
| | | | French Polynesia Overseas Country of French Polynesia | Overseas country of France | French: Polynésie française — Pays d'outre-mer de la Polynésie française | Papeete | 294,935 | 4,167 km^{2} (1,609 sq mi) |
| | | | Galápagos Islands | Special territory of Ecuador | Spanish: Islas Galápagos | Puerto Baquerizo Moreno | 35,000 | 7,880 km^{2} (3,042 sq mi) |
| | | | Guam Territory of Guam | Unincorporated territory of the United States | English: Guam — Territory of Guam Chamorro: Guahan | Hagåtña / Agaña | 183,286 | 544 km^{2} (210 sq mi) |
| | | | Hawaii State of Hawaii | State of the United States | English: Hawaii — State of Hawaii Hawaiian: Hawaiʻi — Mokuʻāina o Hawaiʻi | Honolulu | 1,404,054 | 28,311 km^{2} (10,931 sq mi) |
| | | | Highland Papua Highland Papua Province | Province of Indonesia | Indonesian: Papua Pegunungan | Jayawijaya Regency | 1,408,641 | 108,476 km^{2} (41,883 sq mi) |
| | | | Howland Island | Unincorporated territory of the United States | English: Howland Island | None | Uninhabited | 138.6 km^{2} (53.5 sq mi) |
| | | | Jarvis Island | Unincorporated territory of the United States | English: Jarvis Island | None | Uninhabited | 152 km^{2} (59 sq mi) |
| | | | Johnston Atoll | Unincorporated territory of the United States | English: Johnston Atoll | None | Uninhabited | 276.6 km^{2} (106.8 sq mi) |
| | | | Juan Fernández Islands | Special territory of Chile | Spanish: Archipiélago Juan Fernández | San Juan Bautista | 900 | 99.06 km^{2} (38.25 sq mi) |
| | | | Kingman Reef | Unincorporated territory of the United States | English: Kingman Reef | None | Uninhabited | 1,958.01 km^{2} (755.99 sq mi) |
| | | | Midway Atoll | Unincorporated territory of the United States | English: Midway Islands | None | Uninhabited | 2,355.2 km^{2} (909.3 sq mi) |
| | | | New Caledonia Territory of New Caledonia and Dependencies | Overseas sui generis collectivity of France | French: Nouvelle-Calédonie — Territoire des Nouvelle-Calédonie et Dépendances | Nouméa | 256,275 | 18,575 km^{2} (7,172 sq mi) |
| | | | Norfolk Island Territory of Norfolk Island | External territory of Australia | English: Norfolk Island — Territory of Norfolk Island Norfuk: Teratri of Norf'k Ailen | Kingston | 2,169 | 36 km^{2} (14 sq mi) |
| | | | Northern Mariana Islands Commonwealth of the Northern Mariana Islands | Unincorporated territory and commonwealth of the United States | English: Northern Mariana Islands — Commonwealth of the Northern Mariana Islands Chamorro: Sankattan Siha Na Islas Mariånas Carolinian: Téél Falúw kka Efáng Ilól Marianas | Saipan | 46,050 | 464 km^{2} (179 sq mi) |
| | | | Ogasawara Village | Part of Ogasawara Village in Tokyo, Japan | Bonin Islands: Japanese: 小笠原群島 (Ogasawara Guntō) Marcus Island: Japanese: 南鳥島 (Minamitori Shima) Parece Vela Reef: Japanese: 沖ノ鳥島 (Okinotori Shima) Rosario Island: Japanese: 西之島 (Nishino Shima) Volcano Islands: Japanese: 火山列島 (Kazan Rettō) | Ōmura (大村) | 2,871 | 104.35 km^{2} (40 sq mi) |
| | | | Palmyra Atoll | Incorporated territory of the United States | English: Palmyra Atoll | None | Uninhabited | 12 km^{2} (5 sq mi) |
| | | | Papua Papua Province | Province of Indonesia | Indonesian: Papua | Jayapura | 1,020,190 | 81,049.30 km^{2} (31,293 sq mi) |
| | | | Pitcairn Islands Pitcairn Group of Islands | British overseas territory | English: Pitcairn Islands — Pitcairn, Henderson, Ducie and Oeno Islands Pitkern: Pitkern Ailen | Adamstown | 48 | 47 km^{2} (18 sq mi) |
| | | | South Papua South Papua Province | Province of Indonesia | Indonesian: Papua Selatan | Merauke Regency | 517,623 | 127,280.69 km^{2} (49,143 sq mi) |
| | | | Southwest Papua Southwest Papua Province | Province of Indonesia | Indonesian: Papua Barat Daya | Sorong | 603,054 | 39,167 km^{2} (15,122 sq mi) |
| | | | Tokelau | Dependent territory of New Zealand | Tokelauan: Tokelau English: Tokelau | Each Atoll has its own administrative centre. | 1,384 | 12 km^{2} (5 sq mi) |
| | | | Wake Island | Unincorporated territory of the United States | English: Wake Island | None | Uninhabited | 6.5 km^{2} (2.5 sq mi) |
| | | | Wallis and Futuna Territory of the Wallis and Futuna Islands | Overseas collectivity of France | French: Wallis et Futuna — Territoire des Iles Wallis et Futuna | Mata-Utu | 15,398 | 142 km^{2} (55 sq mi) |
| | | | West Papua West Papua Province | Province of Indonesia | Indonesian: Papua Barat | Manokwari | 551,791 | 64,125.66 km^{2} (24,759 sq mi) |

== See also ==
=== Oceania-related ===
- List of Oceanian countries by GDP (PPP)
- List of Oceanian countries by population
- List of predecessors of sovereign states in Oceania
- List of sovereign states in Asia and Oceania by Human Development Index

=== Island countries ===
- List of Caribbean island countries by population
- List of island countries
- List of sovereign states and dependent territories in the Indian Ocean
- List of sovereign states and dependent territories in Eurasia
