= List of sovereign states and dependent territories in Eurasia =

This is a list of sovereign states and dependent territories in Eurasia, along with other areas of special political status.

Eurasia is a large geographical region comprising the continents of Asia and Europe. It is divided from Africa by the Suez Canal. It is separated from Oceania somewhere in Wallacea, and is usually considered to be including Indonesia and Timor-Leste (East Timor).

Malta is traditionally a part of Eurasia. However, the island country lies on the African Plate. It is geologically associated with the continent of Africa.

Some areas are associated with Eurasian states, being parts of them or dependent upon them, but are not physically in it. Examples are the Danish autonomous territory of Greenland, the French overseas territories, the Spanish autonomous cities of Ceuta and Melilla, and most of the British Overseas Territories.

== Sovereign states ==
=== United Nations member states ===
The following is a list of internationally recognised sovereign states that are member states of the United Nations.

Flag	Coat of Arms / National Emblem	Map	Name	Formal name	Domestic name	Domestic formal name	Capital
Flag of Afghanistan	Emblem of Afghanistan		Afghanistan	Islamic Emirate of Afghanistan	Pashto: فغانستان Afġānistān; Dari: افغانستان Afghānistān	Pashto: د افغانستان اسلامي امارت Də Afġānistān Islāmī Imārat; Dari: امارت اسلامی افغانستان Imārat-i Islāmī-yi Afghānistān	Kabul; Pashto and Dari: کابل; Kābəl
Flag of Albania	Emblem of the Republic of Albania		Albania	Republic of Albania	Albanian: Shqipëria	Albanian: Republika e Shqipërisë	Tirana; Albanian: Tiranë
Flag of Andorra	Coat of arms of Andorra		Andorra	Principality of Andorra	Catalan: Andorra; French: Andorre; Spanish: Andorra	Catalan: Principat d'Andorra; French: Principauté d'Andorre; Spanish: Principado de Andorra	Andorra la Vella; Catalan: Andorra la Vella; French: Andorre-la-Vieille; Spanish: Andorra la Vieja
Flag of Armenia	Coat of arms of Armenia		Armenia (Note: Part of Transcaucasian region, which is a border between Asia and Europe.)	Republic of Armenia	Armenian: Հայաստան/Հայք; Hayastan / Hayq	Armenian: Հայաստանի Հանրապետություն; Hayastani Hanrapetut'yun	Yerevan; Armenian: Երևան Yerevan
Flag of Austria	Coat of arms of Austria		Austria	Republic of Austria	German: Österreich	German: Republik Österreich	Vienna; German: Wien
Flag of Azerbaijan	National emblem of Azerbaijan		Azerbaijan	Republic of Azerbaijan	Azerbaijani: Azərbaycan	Azerbaijani: Azərbaycan Respublikası	Baku; Azerbaijani: Bakı
Flag of Bahrain	Coat of arms of Bahrain		Bahrain	Kingdom of Bahrain	Arabic: البحرين Al Baḩrayn	Arabic: مملكة البحرين Mamlakat al Baḩrayn	Manama; Arabic: المنامة; Al Manāmah
Flag of Bangladesh	National Emblem of Bangladesh		Bangladesh	People's Republic of Bangladesh	Bengali: বাংলাদেশ Bangladesh	Bengali: গণপ্রজাতন্ত্রী বাংলাদেশ Gônoprojatontri Bangladesh	Dhaka; Bengali: ঢাকা Dhaka
Flag of Belarus	National emblem of Belarus		Belarus	Republic of Belarus	Belarusian: Беларусь Bielaruś; Russian: Беларусь Belarus'	Belarusian: Рэспубліка Беларусь Respublika Bielaruś; Russian: Республика Беларусь; Respublika Belarus	Minsk; Belarusian: Мінск Minsk; Russian: Минск Minsk
Flag of Belgium	Coat of arms of Belgium		Belgium	Kingdom of Belgium	Dutch: België; French: Belgique; German: Belgien	Dutch: Koninkrijk België; French: Royaume de Belgique; German: Königreich Belgien	Brussels; Dutch: Brussel; French: Bruxelles; German: Brüssel
Flag of Bhutan	Emblem of Bhutan		Bhutan	Kingdom of Bhutan	Dzongkha: འབྲུག་ཡུལ་ Druk Yul	Dzongkha: འབྲུག་རྒྱལ་ཁབ་ Druk Gyal Khap	Thimphu; Dzongkha: ཐིམ་ཕུ Thimphu
Flag of Bosnia and Herzegovina	Coat of arms of Bosnia and Herzegovina		Bosnia and Herzegovina	Bosnia and Herzegovina	Bosnian, Croatian, and Serbian Latin: BiH, Bosna; Serbian Cyrillic: БиХ, Босна BiH, Bosna	Bosnian, Croatian, and Serbian Latin: Bosna i Hercegovina; Serbian Cyrillic: Босна и Херцеговина; Bosna i Hercegovina	Sarajevo; Bosnian, Croatian, and Serbian Latin: Sarajevo; Serbian Cyrillic: Сарајево Sarajevo
Flag of Brunei	Emblem of Brunei		Brunei	State of Brunei Darussalam	Malay: بروني دارالسلام; Brunei Darussalam	Malay: نڬارا بروني دارالسلام; Negara Brunei Darussalam	Bandar Seri Begawan; Malay: بندر سري بڬاوان; Bandar Seri Begawan
Flag of Bulgaria	Coat of arms of Bulgaria		Bulgaria	Republic of Bulgaria	Bulgarian: България Bulgaria	Bulgarian: Република България Republika Bulgaria	Sofia; Bulgarian: София Sofia
Flag of Cambodia	Royal arms of Cambodia		Cambodia	Kingdom of Cambodia	Khmer: កម្ពុជា Kâmpŭchéa	Khmer: ព្រះរាជាណាចក្រកម្ពុជា Preăh Réachéanachâkr Kâmpŭchéa	Phnom Penh; Khmer: ភ្នំពេញ Phnum Pénh
Flag of China			China	People's Republic of China	Simplified Chinese: 中国 Zhōngguó; Traditional Chinese: 中國 Zhōngguó	Simplified Chinese: 中华人民共和国; Zhōnghuá Rénmín Gònghéguó; Traditional Chinese: 中華人民共和國; Zhōnghuá Rénmín Gònghéguó	Beijing; Chinese: 北京 Beìjíng
Flag of Croatia	Coat of arms of Croatia		Croatia	Republic of Croatia	Croatian: Hrvatska	Croatian: Republika Hrvatska	Zagreb; Croatian: Zagreb
Flag of Cyprus	Coat of arms of Cyprus		Cyprus	Republic of Cyprus	Greek: Κύπρος Kýpros; Turkish: Kıbrıs	Greek: Κυπριακή Δημοκρατία; Kypriakí Dimokratía Turkish: Kıbrıs Cumhuriyeti	Nicosia; Greek: Λευκωσία Lefkosía; Turkish: Lefkoşa
Flag of the Czech Republic	Coat of arms of the Czech Republic		Czech Republic	Czech Republic	Czech: Česko	Czech: Česká republika	Prague; Czech: Praha
Flag of Denmark	Coat of arms of Denmark		Denmark	Kingdom of Denmark	Danish: Danmark	Danish: Kongeriget Danmark	Copenhagen; Danish: København
Flag of Egypt	Coat of arms of Egypt		Egypt	Arab Republic of Egypt	Arabic: جمهورية مصر العربية	Arabic: جمهورية مصر العربية; Al ʻJumhūrīyat Miṣr al-ʻArabīyah	Cairo; Arabic: القاهرة al-Qāhirah
Flag of Estonia	Coat of arms of Estonia		Estonia	Republic of Estonia	Estonian: Eesti	Estonian: Eesti Vabariik	Tallinn; Estonian: Tallinn
Flag of Finland	Coat of arms of Finland		Finland	Republic of Finland	Finnish: Suomi; Swedish: Finland	Finnish: Suomen tasavalta Swedish: Republiken Finland	Helsinki; Finnish: Helsinki; Swedish: Helsingfors
Flag of France	National emblem of France		France	French Republic	French: France	French: République française	Paris; French: Paris
Flag of Georgia	Coat of arms of Georgia (country)		Georgia	Georgia	Georgian: საქართველო Sakartvelo	Georgian: საქართველო Sakartvelo	Tbilisi; Georgian: თბილისი Tbilisi
Flag of Germany	Coat of arms of Germany		Germany	Federal Republic of Germany	German: Deutschland	German: Bundesrepublik Deutschland	Berlin; German: Berlin
Flag of Greece	Coat of arms of Greece		Greece	Hellenic Republic	Greek: Ελλάδα / Ελλάς; Elláda / Ellás	Greek: Ελληνική Δημοκρατία; Ellinikí Dimokratía	Athens; Greek: Αθήνα; Athína
Flag of Hungary	Coat of arms of Hungary		Hungary	Hungary	Hungarian: Magyarország	Hungarian: Magyarország	Budapest; Hungarian: Budapest
Flag of Iceland	Coat of arms of Iceland		Iceland	Iceland	Icelandic: Ísland	Icelandic: Lýðveldið Ísland	Reykjavík; Icelandic: Reykjavík
Flag of India	State Emblem of India		India	Republic of India	Hindi: भारत Bhārat	Hindi: भारत गणराज्य Bhārat Gaṇarājya	New Delhi; Hindi: नई दिल्ली Nai Dilli
Flag of Indonesia	National emblem of Indonesia		Indonesia (Note: Some territory could be argued to be a part of Asia or Oceania.)	Republic of Indonesia	Indonesian: Indonesia	Indonesian: Republik Indonesia	Jakarta; Indonesian: Jakarta
Flag of Iran	Emblem of Iran		Iran	Islamic Republic of Iran	Persian: ايران Irān	Persian: جمهوری اسلامی ايران; Jomhuri-ye Eslāmi-ye Irān	Tehran; Persian: تهران Tehrān
Flag of Iraq	Coat of arms of Iraq		Iraq	Republic of Iraq	Arabic: العراق Al 'Irāq; Kurdish: عێراق Êraq	Arabic: جمهورية العراق Jumhūriyyat al 'Irāq; Kurdish: كۆماری عێراق Komarî Êraq	Baghdad; Arabic: بَغْدَاد Baghdād
Flag of Ireland	Coat of arms of Ireland		Ireland	Ireland (Note: The terms Republic of Ireland and Poblacht na hÉireann are not official long names and are used only as a legal description meant to differentiate the state from the island.)	Irish: Éire	Irish: Éire	Dublin; Irish: Baile Átha Cliath
Flag of Israel	Emblem of Israel		Israel	State of Israel	Hebrew: יִשְרָאֵל Yisrā'el; Arabic: اسرائيل Isrā'īl	Hebrew: מְדִינַת יִשְׂרָאֵל Medīnat Yisrā'el; Arabic: دولة اسرائيل Dawlat Isrā'īl	Jerusalem (not internationally recognised); Hebrew: יְרוּשָׁלַיִם Yerushalayim; Arabic: القدس Al Quds
Flag of Italy	Emblem of Italy		Italy	Italian Republic	Italian: Italia	Italian: Repubblica Italiana	Rome; Italian: Roma
Flag of Japan	Imperial Seal of Japan		Japan	Japan	Japanese: 日本国; Nippon-koku / Nihon-koku	Japanese: 日本国 Nippon-koku / Nihon-koku	Tokyo; Japanese: 東京 Tokyo
Flag of Jordan	Coat of arms of Jordan		Jordan	Hashemite Kingdom of Jordan	Arabic: الأردنية Al 'urdun	Arabic: المملكة الأردنية الهاشميه Al Mamlakah al 'Urduniyyah al Hāshimiyyah	Amman; Arabic: عَمّان 'Ammān
Flag of Kazakhstan	Emblem of Kazakhstan		Kazakhstan	Republic of Kazakhstan	Kazakh: Қазақстан; Qazaqstan; Russian: Казахстан; Kazakhstan	Kazakh: Қазақстан Республикасы; Qazaqstan Respublïkası; Russian: Республика Казахстан; Respublika Kazakhstan	Astana; Kazakh: Астана Astana; Russian: Астана Astana
Flag of North Korea	Emblem of North Korea		Korea, North	Democratic People's Republic of Korea		Korean: 조선민주주의인민공화국; Chosŏn Minjujuŭi Inmin Konghwaguk	Pyongyang; Korean: 평양 Pyongyang
Flag of South Korea	Emblem of South Korea		Korea, South	Republic of Korea		Korean: 대한민국 Daehan Minguk	Seoul; Korean: 서울 Seoul
Flag of Kuwait	Emblem of Kuwait		Kuwait	State of Kuwait	Arabic: الكويت Al Kuwayt	Arabic: دولة الكويت Dawlat al Kuwayt	Kuwait City; Arabic: مدينة الكويت Madīnat al Kuwayt
Flag of Kyrgyzstan	Emblem of Kyrgyzstan		Kyrgyzstan	Kyrgyz Republic	Kyrgyz and Russian: Кыргызстан Kırgızstan	Kyrgyz: Кыргыз Республикасы; Kırgız Respublikası; Russian: Кыргызская Республика; Kyrgyzskaya Respublika	Bishkek; Kyrgyz and Russian: Бишкек Bishkek
Flag of Laos	Emblem of Laos		Laos	Lao People's Democratic Republic	Lao: ລາວ Lāo	Lao: ສາທາລະນະລັດ ປະຊາທິປະໄຕ ປະຊາຊົນລາວ; Sathalanalat Paxathipatai Paxaxôn Lāo	Vientiane; Lao: ວຽງຈັນ Vientiane
Flag of Latvia	Coat of arms of Latvia		Latvia	Republic of Latvia	Latvian: Latvija	Latvian: Latvijas Republika	Riga; Latvian: Rīga
Flag of Lebanon	Coat of arms of Lebanon		Lebanon	Lebanese Republic	Arabic: لبنان Lubnān; French: Liban	Arabic: الجمهورية اللبنانية Al Jumhūriyyah al Lubnāniyyah; French: République libanaise	Beirut; Arabic: بيروت Bayrūt
Flag of Liechtenstein	Coat of arms of Liechtenstein		Liechtenstein	Principality of Liechtenstein	German: Liechtenstein	German: Fürstentum Liechtenstein	Vaduz; German: Vaduz
Flag of Lithuania	Coat of arms of Lithuania		Lithuania	Republic of Lithuania	Lithuanian: Lietuva	Lithuanian: Lietuvos Respublika	Vilnius; Lithuanian: Vilnius
Flag of Luxembourg	Coat of arms of Luxembourg		Luxembourg	Grand Duchy of Luxembourg	Luxembourgish: Lëtzebuerg; French: Luxembourg; German: Luxemburg	Luxembourgish: Groussherzogtum Lëtzebuerg; French: Grand-Duché de Luxembourg; German: Großherzogtum Luxemburg	Luxembourg City; Luxembourgish: Stad Lëtzebuerg; French: Ville de Luxembourg; German: Luxemburg Stadt
Flag of Malaysia	Coat of arms of Malaysia		Malaysia	Malaysia	Malay: Malaysia; Simplified Chinese: 马来西亚 Mǎláixīyà; Traditional Chinese: 馬來西亞 Mǎláixīyà	Malay: Malaysia; Simplified Chinese: 马来西亚 Mǎláixīyà; Traditional Chinese: 馬來西亞 Mǎláixīyà	Kuala Lumpur; Malay: Kuala Lumpur; Chinese: 吉隆坡 Jílóngpō
Flag of Maldives	Emblem of Maldives		Maldives	Republic of Maldives	Dhivehi: ދިވެހިރާއްޖެ Dhivehi Raajje	Dhivehi: ދިވެހިރާއްޖޭގެ ޖުމުހޫރިއްޔާ Dhivehi Raajjeyge Jumhooriyyaa	Malé; Dhivehi: މާލެ Male
Flag of Malta	Coat of arms of Malta		Malta	Republic of Malta	Maltese: Malta	Maltese: Repubblika ta' Malta	Valletta; Maltese: Il-Belt Valletta
Flag of Moldova	oat of arms of Moldova		Moldova	Republic of Moldova	Romanian: Moldova	Romanian: Republica Moldova	Chișinău; Romanian: Chișinău
Flag of Monaco	Coat of arms of Monaco		Monaco	Principality of Monaco	French and Italian: Monaco; Monégasque: Múnegu; Occitan: Mónegue	French: Principauté de Monaco; Monégasque: Principatu de Múnegu; Occitan: Principat de Mónegue; Italian: Principato di Monaco	Monaco (Note: These countries are city-states.); French and Italian: Monaco; Monégasque: Múnegu; Occitan: Mónegue
Flag of Mongolia	Emblem of Mongolia		Mongolia	Mongolia	Mongolian: Монгол улс and Mongol uls	Mongolian: Монгол улс and Mongol uls	Ulaanbaatar; Mongolian: Улаанбаатар and Ulaanbaatar
Flag of Montenegro	Coat of arms of Montenegroo		Montenegro	Montenegro	Montenegrin Latin: Crna Gora; Montenegrin Cyrillic: Црна Гора Crna Gora	Montenegrin Latin: Crna Gora; Montenegrin Cyrillic: Црна Гора Crna Gora	Podgorica; Montenegrin Latin: Podgorica; Montenegrin Cyrillic: Подгорица Podgorica
State Flag of Myanmar	State Seal of Myanmar		Myanmar	Republic of the Union of Myanmar	Burmese: မြန်မာ	Burmese: ပြည်ထောင်စုသမ္မတမြန်မာနိုင်ငံတော်	Naypyidaw; Burmese: နေပြည်တော်
Flag of Nepal	Emblem of Nepal		Nepal	Federal Democratic Republic of Nepal	Nepali:नेपाल Nepāl	Nepali: संघीय लोकतान्त्रिक गणतन्त्र नेपाल; Sanghiya Loktāntrik Ganatantra Nepāl	Kathmandu; Nepali: काठमाडौँ Kathmandu
Flag of the Netherlands	Coat of arms of the Netherlands		Netherlands (Note: Netherlands is the name for the largest country within the Kingdom of the Netherlands and the short name for the Kingdom)	Kingdom of the Netherlands (Note: Refers to the sovereign entity encompassing the countries the Netherlands (comprising the European Netherlands and the Caribbean Netherlands), Aruba, Curaçao, and Sint Maarten.)	Dutch: Nederland	Dutch: Koninkrijk der Nederlanden	Amsterdam (capital); Dutch: Amsterdam; The Hague (seat of government); Dutch: 's-Gravenhage (Den Haag)
Flag of North Macedonia	National emblem of North Macedonia		North Macedonia	Republic of North Macedonia	Macedonian: Северна Македонија; Severna Makedonija	Macedonian: Република Северна Македонија; Republika Severna Makedonija	Skopje; Macedonian: Скопје Skopje
Flag of Norway	Coat of arms of Norway		Norway	Kingdom of Norway	Bokmål: Norge; Nynorsk: Noreg	Bokmål: Kongeriket Norge; Nynorsk: Kongeriket Noreg	Oslo; Bokmål and Nynorsk: Oslo
Flag of Oman	National emblem of Oman		Oman	Sultanate of Oman	Arabic: عُمان ʻUmān	Arabic: سلطنة عُمان Salțanat ʻUmān	Muscat; Arabic: مَسْقَط Masqaț
Flag of Pakistan	State emblem of Pakistan		Pakistan	Islamic Republic of Pakistan	Urdu: پاکستان Pākistān	Urdu: اسلامی جمہوریہ پاکستان; Islāmī Jumhūriyah Pākistān	Islamabad; Urdu: اسلام‌آباد Islāmābād
Flag of the Philippines	Coat of arms of the Philippines		Philippines	Republic of the Philippines	Filipino: Pilipinas	Filipino: Republika ng Pilipinas	Manila; Filipino: Maynila
Flag of Poland	Coat of arms of Poland		Poland	Republic of Poland	Polish: Polska	Polish: Rzeczpospolita Polska	Warsaw; Polish: Warszawa
Flag of Portugal	Coat of arms of Portugal		Portugal	Portuguese Republic	Portuguese: Portugal	Portuguese: República Portuguesa	Lisbon; Portuguese: Lisboa
Flag of Qatar			Qatar	State of Qatar	Arabic: قطر Qațar	Arabic: دولة قطر Dawlat Qațar	Doha; Arabic: الدوحة Ad Dawḩah
Flag of Romania	Coat of arms of Romania		Romania	Romania	Romanian: România	Romanian: România	Bucharest; Romanian: București
Flag of Russia	Coat of arms of Russia		Russia	Russian Federation	Russian: Россия Rossiya	Russian: Российская Федерация; Rossiyskaya Federatsiya	Moscow; Russian: Москва Moskva
Flag of San Marino	Coat of arms of San Marino		San Marino	Republic of San Marino	Italian: San Marino	Italian: Repubblica di San Marino	City of San Marino; Italian: Città di San Marino
Flag of Saudi Arabia	Emblem of Saudi Arabia		Saudi Arabia	Kingdom of Saudi Arabia	Arabic: العربية السعودية; Al ʻArabiyyah as Suʻūdiyyah	Arabic: المملكة العربية السعودية; Al Mamlakah al ʻArabiyyah as Suʻūdiyyah	Riyadh; Arabic: الرياض Ar Riyāḑ
Flag of Serbia	Coat of arms of Serbia		Serbia	Republic of Serbia	Serbian Cyrillic: Србија Srbija; Serbian Latin: Srbija	Serbian Cyrillic: Република Србија Republika Srbija; Serbian Latin: Republika Srbija	Belgrade; Serbian Cyrillic: Београд Beograd; Serbian Latin: Beograd
Flag of Singapore	Coat of arms of Singapore		Singapore	Republic of Singapore	Simplified Chinese: 新加坡 Xīnjiāpō; Malay: Singapura; Tamil: சிங்கப்பூர் Ciṅkappūr	Simplified Chinese: 新加坡共和国; Xīnjiāpō Gònghéguó; Malay: Republik Singapura; Tamil: சிங்கப்பூர் குடியரசு Ciṅkappūr Kuṭiyaracu	Singapore; Simplified Chinese: 新加坡 Xīnjiāpō; Malay: Singapura; Tamil: சிங்கப்பூர் Ciṅkappūr
Flag of Slovakia	Coat of arms of Slovakia		Slovakia	Slovak Republic	Slovak: Slovensko	Slovak: Slovenská republika	Bratislava; Slovak: Bratislava
Flag of Slovenia	Coat of arms of Slovenia		Slovenia	Republic of Slovenia	Slovene: Slovenija	Slovene: Republika Slovenija	Ljubljana; Slovene: Ljubljana
Flag of Spain	Coat of arms of Spain		Spain	Kingdom of Spain	Spanish: España	Spanish: Reino de España	Madrid; Spanish: Madrid
Flag of Sri Lanka	Emblem of Sri Lanka		Sri Lanka	Democratic Socialist Republic of Sri Lanka	Sinhalese: ශ්‍රී ලංකාවේ Śrī Laṁkāva; Tamil: இலங்கை Ilaṅkai	Sinhalese: ශ්‍රී ලංකාවේ ප්‍රජාතන්ත්‍රවාදී සමාජවාදී ජනරජය Śrī Laṁkāvē Prajātantravādī Samājavādī Janarajaya; Tamil: இலங்கை ஜனநாயக சமத்துவ குடியரசு Ilaṅkai Jaṉanāyaka Cōcalica Kuṭiyaracu	Sri Jayawardenapura Kotte; Sinhalese: ශ්‍රී ජයවර්ධනපුර කෝට්ටේ Śrī Jayavardhanapura Kōṭṭē; Tamil: ஸ்ரீ ஜெயவர்தனபுர கோட்டே Srī Jeyavartaṉapura Kōṭṭē
Flag of Sweden	Coat of arms of Sweden		Sweden	Kingdom of Sweden	Swedish: Sverige	Swedish: Konungariket Sverige	Stockholm; Swedish: Stockholm
Flag of Switzerland	Coat of arms of Switzerland		Switzerland	Swiss Confederation	Latin: Helvetica; German: Schweiz; French: Suisse; Italian: Svizzera; Romansh: Svizra	Latin: Confoederatio Helvetica; German: Schweizerische Eidgenossenschaft; French: Confédération suisse Italian: Confederazione Svizzera; Romansh: Confederaziun svizra	Bern or Berne; Bernese German: Bärn; German: Bern; French: Berne; Italian: Berna; Romansh: Berna
Flag of Syria	Syrian national emblem		Syria	Syrian Arab Republic	Arabic: سورية Sūriyyah or Arabic: سوريا Sūriyā	Arabic: الجمهورية العربية السورية; Al Jumhūriyyah al ʿArabiyyah as Sūriyyah	Damascus; Arabic: دِمَشْق Dimashq
Flag of Tajikistan	Emblem of Tajikistan		Tajikistan	Republic of Tajikistan	Tajik: Тоҷикистон Tojikiston Russian: Таджикистан Tadzhikistan	Tajik: Ҷумҳурии Тоҷикистон Jumhurii Tojikiston Russian: Республика Таджикистан Respublika Tadzhikistan	Dushanbe; Tajik and Russian: Душанбе Dushanbe
Flag of Thailand	Emblem of Thailand		Thailand	Kingdom of Thailand	Thai: ประเทศไทย; Prathed Thai	Thai: ราชอาณาจักรไทย; Ratcha Anachak Thai	Bangkok; Thai: กรุงเทพมหานคร Krung Thep Maha Nakhon
Flag of Timor-Leste	Coat of arms of Timor-Leste		Timor-Leste	Democratic Republic of Timor-Leste	Portuguese: Timor-Leste	Portuguese: República Democrática de Timor-Leste	Dili; Portuguese: Díli
Flag of Turkey	National emblem of Turkey		Türkiye	Republic of Türkiye	Turkish: Türkiye	Turkish: Türkiye Cumhuriyeti	Ankara
Flag of Turkmenistan	Emblem of Turkmenistan		Turkmenistan	Turkmenistan	Turkmen: Türkmenistan	Turkmen: Türkmenistan respublikasy	Ashgabat; Turkmen: Aşgabat
Flag of Ukraine	Coat of arms of Ukraine		Ukraine	Ukraine	Ukrainian: Україна Ukraina	Ukrainian: Україна Ukraina	Kyiv; Ukrainian: Київ Kyiv
Flag of the United Arab Emirates	Emblem of the United Arab Emirates		United Arab Emirates	United Arab Emirates	Arabic: الإمارات العربية المتحدة; Al Imārāt al 'Arabiyyah al Muttaḩidah	Arabic: دولة الإمارات العربية المتحدة; Dawlat al Imārāt al 'Arabiyyah al Muttaḩidah	Abu Dhabi; Arabic: أَبُو ظَبْيٍ Abū Ḏẖabī
Flag of the United Kingdom	Royal coat of arms of the United Kingdom		United Kingdom (Note: The United Kingdom (UK) consists of the constituent countries England, Northern Ireland, Scotland, and Wales and controls the Crown Dependencies of Guernsey, the Isle of Man, and Jersey. The mainlands of England, Scotland and Wales make up the island of Great Britain (often shortened to Britain), which is sometimes used synonymously with the United Kingdom.)	United Kingdom of Great Britain and Northern Ireland		English: United Kingdom of Great Britain and Northern Ireland; Welsh: Teyrnas Unedig Prydain Fawr a Gogledd Iwerddon; Scottish Gaelic: An Rìoghachd Aonaichte na Breatainn Mhòr agus Eirinn a Tuath; Irish: Ríocht Aontaithe na Breataine Móire agus Thuaisceart Éireann; Scots: Unitit Kinrick o Graet Breetain an Northren Irland; Cornish: An Rywvaneth Unys a Vreten Veur hag Iwerdhon Glédh	London
Flag of Uzbekistan	Emblem of Uzbekistan		Uzbekistan	Republic of Uzbekistan	Uzbek: O'zbekiston	Uzbek: O'zbekiston Respublikasi	Tashkent; Uzbek: Toshkent
Flag of Vietnam	Emblem of Vietnam		Vietnam	Socialist Republic of Vietnam	Vietnamese: Việt Nam	Vietnamese: Cộng hòa Xã hội chủ nghĩa Việt Nam	Hanoi; Vietnamese: Hà Nội
Flag of Yemen	nEmblem of Yemen		Yemen	Republic of Yemen	Arabic: اليمن Al Yaman	Arabic: الجمهورية اليمنية; Al Jumhūriyyah al Yamaniyyah	Sanaa; Arabic: صَنْعَاء Şanʿāʾ

=== United Nations General Assembly non-member observer states ===
Non-member sovereign states are free to submit a petition to join as a full member at their discretion. The petition is then evaluated by the United Nations Security Council and the United Nations General Assembly (UNGA). For example, Switzerland was a UNGA non-member observer state from 1948 to 2002, until becoming a full member of the UN on September 10, 2002. Currently, there are two non-member observer states, namely the Holy See and the State of Palestine. They are both referred to as "non-member States having received a standing invitation to participate as observers in the sessions and the work of the General Assembly and maintaining permanent observer missions at Headquarters".

Flag	Coat of Arms / National Emblem	Map	English short name	English long name	Legal status	Domestic short name	Domestic long name	Capital
Flag of Palestine	Coat of arms of Palestine		Palestine	State of Palestine	Observer state at the United Nations	Arabic: فلسـطين Filasțīn	Arabic: دولة فلسـطين Dawlat Filasțīn	Ramallah (de facto); Jerusalem (de jure)
Flag of the Vatican City	Coats of arms of the Holy See and Vatican City	Map showing Vatican City in Europe	Vatican City Holy See	State of the Vatican City	Observer state at the United Nations	Italian: Città del Vaticano; Latin: Sancta Sedes	Italian: Stato della Città del Vaticano	Vatican City; Italian: Città del Vaticano; Latin: Sancta Sedes

=== States with limited recognition ===
The following entities are not member states of the United Nations and have limited or no recognition. However, they are defined as states by the declarative theory of statehood.

Flag	Coat of Arms / National Emblem	Map	English short name	English long name	Legal status	Domestic short name	Domestic long name	Capital
Flag of Abkhazia	Emblem of Abkhazia		Abkhazia	Republic of Abkhazia	De jure part of Georgia (Note: International recognition of Abkhazia and South Ossetia)	Abkhaz: Аԥсны Apsny Georgian: აფხაზეთი Abkhazeti / Apkhazeti; Russian: Абхазия Abhaziya	Abkhaz: Аԥсны Аҳәынҭқарра; Apsny Ahwyntkarra; Russian: Республика Абхазия; Respublika Abhaziya	Sukhumi; Abkhaz: Аҟəа Akwa Georgian: სოხუმი Sokhumi; Russian: Сухуми Sukhumi
Flag of Kosovo	Emblem of Kosovo		Kosovo	Republic of Kosovo	De jure part of Serbia (Note: International recognition of Kosovo)	Albanian: Kosova, Kosovë Serbian Cyrillic: Косово Kosovo	Albanian: Republika e Kosovës Serbian Cyrillic: Република Косово; Republika Kosovo	Pristina; Albanian: Prishtina, Prishtinë Serbian Cyrillic: Приштина Priština
Flag of Northern Cyprus	Coat of arms of Northern Cyprus		Northern Cyprus	Turkish Republic of Northern Cyprus	De jure part of Cyprus (Note: International recognition of Northern Cyprus)	Turkish: Kuzey Kıbrıs	Turkish: Kuzey Kıbrıs Türk Cumhuriyeti	North Nicosia; Turkish: Kuzey Lefkoşa
Flag of South Ossetia	Coat of arms of Ossetia		South Ossetia	Republic of South Ossetia–the State of Alania	De jure part of Georgia	Iron Ossetic: Хуссар Ирыстон Khussar Iryston Georgian: სამხრეთ ოსეთი Samkhret Oseti; Russian: Южная Осетия Yuzhnaya Osetiya	Iron Ossetic: Хуссар Ирыстон Республика Khussar Iryston Respublika; Russian: Республика Южная Осетия Respublika Yuzhnaya Osetiya	Tskhinvali; Iron Ossetic: Цхинвал / Чъреба Tskhinval / Chreba; Georgian: ცხინვალი Tskhinvali; Russian: Цхинвал / Цхинвали Tskhinval / Tskhinvali
Flag of the Republic of China	Emblem of Taiwan		Taiwan	Republic of China	See Legal Status of Taiwan	Traditional Chinese: 臺灣 / 台灣 Táiwān; Taiwanese: 臺灣 / 台灣; Tâi-oân	Traditional Chinese: 中華民國 Zhōnghuá Mínguó; Taiwanese: 中華民國 Tiong-hoâ Bîn-kok	Taipei; Traditional Chinese: 臺北 Táiběi
Flag of Transnistria	Coat of arms of Transnistria		Transnistria	Pridnestrovian Moldavian Republic	De jure part of Moldova (Note: International recognition of Transnistria)	Romanian: Transnistria; Russian: Приднестрoвье Pridnestrov'ye; Ukrainian: Придністрoв'я Prydnistrovia	Romanian: Republica Moldovenească Nistreană; Russian: Приднестрoвская Молдaвская Республика; Pridnestrovskaya Moldavskaya Respublika; Ukrainian: Придністровська Молдавська Республіка; Prydnistrovska Moldavska Respublika	Tiraspol; Romanian: Tiraspol; Russian and Ukrainian: Тирасполь Tiraspol'

== Dependent territories ==
The following entities are territories in Eurasia that remain outside the controlling state's integral area.

Flag	Map	English short name	English long name	Legal status	Domestic short name	Domestic long name	Capital
Flag of the United Kingdom		Akrotiri and Dhekelia	Sovereign Base Areas of Akrotiri and Dhekelia	British overseas territory	Akrotiri and Dhekelia	Sovereign Base Areas of Akrotiri and Dhekelia	Episkopi Cantonment
Flag of the British Indian Ocean Territory	board	British Indian Ocean Territory	British Indian Ocean Territory	British overseas territory	British Indian Ocean Territory	British Indian Ocean Territory	Diego Garcia
Flag of Christmas Island		Christmas Island (Note: Debate exists as to whether Australian territories are integral areas of Australia of not)	Territory of Christmas Island	External territory of Australia	Christmas Island	Territory of Christmas Island	Flying Fish Cove
		Cocos (Keeling) Islands	Territory of Cocos (Keeling) Islands	External territory of Australia	Cocos (Keeling) Islands	Territory of Cocos (Keeling) Islands	West Island
Flag of the Faroe Islands		Faroe Islands		Constituent country of the Kingdom of Denmark	Faroese: Føroyar; Danish: Færøerne		Tórshavn; Faroese: Tórshavn; Danish: Thorshavn
Flag of Gibraltar		Gibraltar		British overseas territory	Gibraltar		Gibraltar
Flag of Guernsey		Guernsey	Bailiwick of Guernsey	Crown dependency of The Crown in Right of Guernsey	English: Guernsey; Guernésiais: Guernesey	English: Bailiwick of Guernsey; Guernésiais: Bailliage de Guernesey	Saint Peter Port; Guernésiais: Saint-Pierre Port
Flag of the Isle of Man		Isle of Man		Crown dependency of The Crown in Right of the Isle of Man	English: Mann; Manx: Mannin	English: Isle of Man; Manx: Ellan Vannin	Douglas; Manx: Doolish
Flag of Jersey		Jersey	Bailiwick of Jersey	Crown dependency of The Crown in Right of Jersey	English: Jersey; Jèrriais: Jèrri	English: Bailiwick of Jersey; Jèrriais: Bailliage de Jersey	Saint Helier; Jèrriais: Saint-Hélyi

== Areas of special sovereignty ==
The following entities are an integral part of their administering state but have a political arrangement which was decided by an agreement with another sovereign state.

Flag	Map	English short name	English long name	Legal status	Domestic short name	Domestic long name	Capital
Flag of Åland		Åland	Åland Islands	Autonomous region of Finland	Swedish: Åland; Finnish: Ahvenanmaa	Swedish: Landskapet Åland; Finnish: Ahvenanmaan maakunta	Mariehamn; Swedish: Mariehamn; Finnish: Maarianhamina
Flag of Hong Kong		Hong Kong	Hong Kong Special Administrative Region of the People's Republic of China	Special administrative region of China	Chinese: 香港	Chinese: 香港特别行政區	Admiralty; Chinese: 金鐘
Flag of Norway		Jan Mayen	Jan Mayen	Overseas territory of Norway, administered by the county governor of Nordland with some authority delegated to the station commander of the Norwegian Defence Logistics Organisation, a branch of the Norwegian Armed Forces.	Norwegian: Jan Mayen	Norwegian: Jan Mayen	Olonkinbyen; Norwegian: Olonkinbyen
Flag of Macau		Macao	Macao Special Administrative Region of the People's Republic of China	Special administrative region of China	Chinese: 澳門 Àomén	Chinese: 澳門特別行政區 Àomén Tèbié Xíngzhèngqū	
Flag of Norway		Svalbard	Svalbard	Special overseas territory of Norway	Norwegian: Svalbard	Norwegian: Svalbard	Longyearbyen; Norwegian: Longyearbyen

== See also ==
- List of Eurasian countries by population
- List of sovereign states and dependent territories by continent
  - List of sovereign states and dependent territories in Africa
  - List of sovereign states and dependent territories in Asia
  - List of sovereign states and dependent territories in Europe
  - List of sovereign states and dependent territories in Oceania
  - List of sovereign states and dependent territories in the Americas
    - List of sovereign states and dependent territories in North America
      - List of sovereign states and dependent territories in the Caribbean
    - List of sovereign states and dependent territories in South America
  - Territorial claims in Antarctica
