= List of Caribbean countries by population =

This list of Caribbean countries and dependencies by population is sorted by the mid-year normalized demographic projections from the United Nations for 2023. The change from the previous year and the most recent official population figure is also given.

Culturally Caribbean mainland countries such as Belize and Guyana are included.

== Table ==
Top island populations by country and dependency in the Caribbean
1. Haiti (25.2%)
2. Dominican Republic (24.4%)
3. Cuba (24.1%)
4. Puerto Rico (US) (7.00%)
5. Jamaica (6.10%)
6. Trinidad and Tobago (3.30%)
7. Others (9.90%)

	Country/dependency	% total	UN 2023 estimate	% change	Official figure	Official date
1	Haiti	25.0%	11,724,764	1.2%	9,801,664	1 Jul 2012
2	Dominican Republic	24.0%	11,332,973	0.9%	10,711,155	1 Jul 2023
3	Cuba	24.0%	11,194,449	-0.2%	10,055,968	1 Dec 2023
4	Puerto Rico (US)	7.0%	3,260,314	-1.6%	3,184,195	1 Jul 2025
5	Jamaica	6.1%	2,825,544	-0.1%	2,734,092	1 Jul 2019
6	Trinidad and Tobago	3.3%	1,534,937	0.3%	1,365,805	30 Jun 2022
–	Guyana	1.8%	813,834	0.6%	743,699	1 Jul 2019
–	Suriname	1.3%	623,237	0.8%	616,500	1 Jul 2021
7	Bahamas	0.9%	412,624	0.6%	395,640	1 Jul 2019
–	Belize	0.9%	410,825	1.4%	441,471	1 Jul 2022
8	Guadeloupe (France)	0.9%	395,839	0.0%	390,253	1 Jul 2020
9	Martinique (France)	0.8%	366,981	-0.1%	372,594	1 Jul 2020
10	Barbados	0.6%	281,996	0.1%	269,090	1 May 2010
11	Curaçao (Netherlands)	0.4%	192,077	0.5%	148,925	1 Jan 2023
12	Saint Lucia	0.4%	180,251	0.2%	178,696	1 Jul 2018
13	Grenada	0.3%	126,184	0.6%	112,579	1 Jul 2019
14	Aruba (Netherlands)	0.2%	106,277	0.4%	108,027	31 Dec 2024
15	Saint Vincent and the Grenadines	0.2%	103,699	-0.2%	110,418	1 Jul 2022
16	U.S. Virgin Islands (US)	0.2%	98,750	-0.7%	87,146	1 Apr 2020
17	Antigua and Barbuda	0.2%	94,298	0.6%	100,772	1 Jan 2022
18	Dominica	0.2%	73,040	0.4%	71,293	14 May 2011
19	Cayman Islands (UK)	0.1%	69,310	0.9%	71,432	10 Oct 2021
20	Saint Kitts and Nevis	0.1%	47,755	0.2%	47,195	15 May 2011
21	Turks and Caicos (UK)	0.1%	46,062	0.8%	46,131	1 Jul 2021
22	Sint Maarten (Neth.)	0.1%	44,222	0.1%	42,938	1 Jan 2023
23	Saint Martin (France)	0.07%	32,077	0.9%	36,108	1 Jan 2020
24	British Virgin Islands (UK)	0.07%	31,538	0.7%	28,054	12 Jul 2010
25	Caribbean Netherlands (Neth.)	0.06%	27,148	0.4%	27,726	1 Jan 2022
26	Anguilla (UK)	0.03%	15,900	0.3%	15,780	1 Dec 2022
27	Saint Barthélemy (France)	0.02%	10,994	0.2%	10,083	1 Jan 2020
28	Montserrat (UK)	0.01%	4,387	-0.1%	4,433	1 Jul 2022
Caribbean		100%	46,482,286	0.6%	43,432,864	

== Map ==
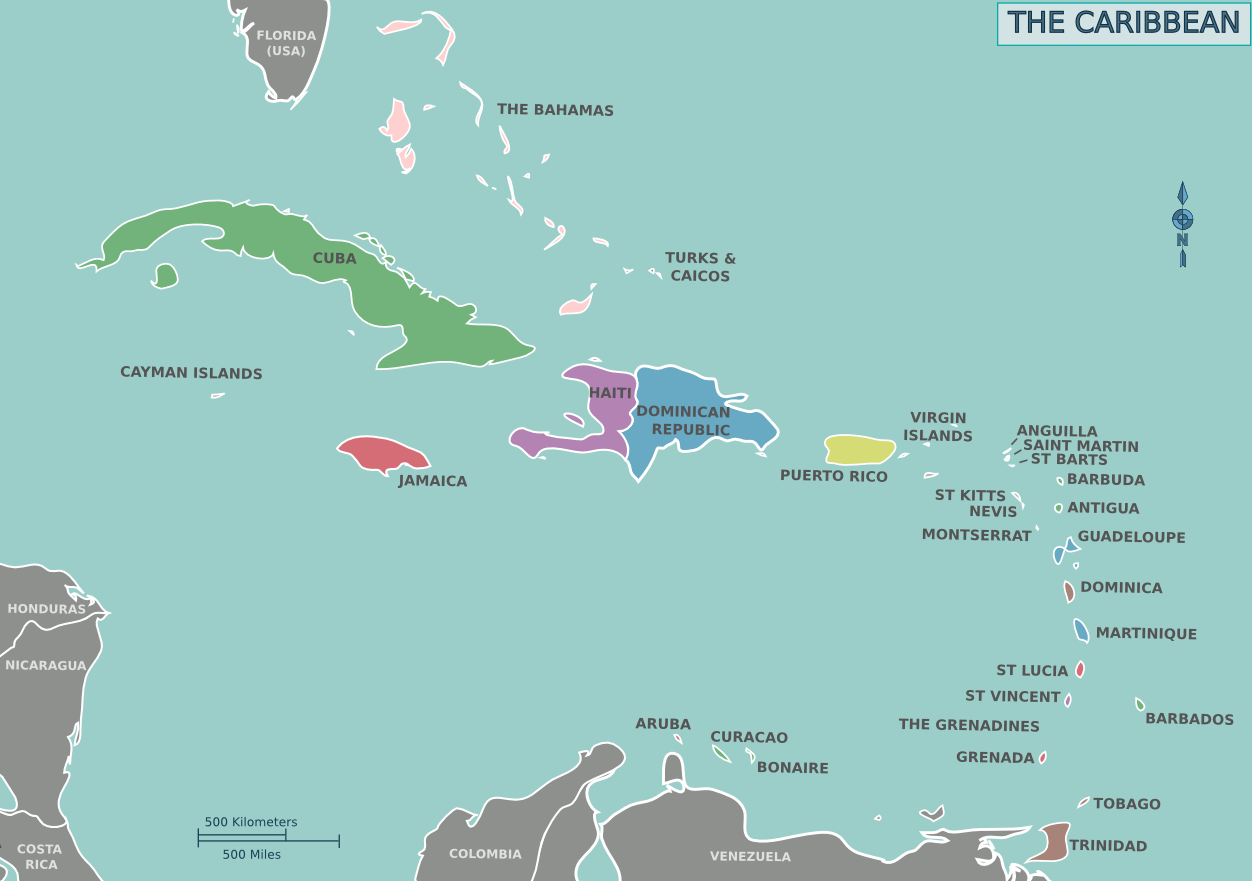
Map of island countries and dependencies in the Caribbean

== See also ==
- List of Caribbean islands
- List of Caribbean islands by area
- List of sovereign states and dependent territories in the Caribbean
- List of metropolitan areas in the West Indies
- List of West Indian first-level country subdivisions
