= Mikhail Apalkov =

Soviet military personnel (1925–2013)

Mikhail Petrovich Apalkov
- Михаил Петрович Апальков
- Born: 12 November 1925; Trunovskoye, Stavropol Krai, RSFSR
- Died: 25 March 2013 (aged 87)
- Military career
- Allegiance: Soviet Union
- Branch: Red Army
- Service years: 1943–1948
- Conflicts: World War II
- Awards: Order of Glory, 1st class Order of the Red Banner

Mikhail Petrovich Apalkov (Russian: Михаил Петрович Апальков; 12 November 1925, Trunovskoye – 25 March 2013, Stavropol Krai) was a Russian soldier who fought on the Eastern Front of World War II. He was awarded the Order of Glory four times.

At the time he was awarded the Order of Glory 1st class, he was a reconnaissance officer of the 110th Guards Rifle Regiment.

== Early life ==
Mikhail Petrovich Apalkov was born on 12 November 1925 in Trunovskoye, Stavropol Krai, in the Russian Soviet Federative Socialist Republic.

== Military service ==
Apalkov volunteered for service in the Red Army in late 1943 and arrived at the front in February 1944.

On 25 August 1944, Apalkov found himself behind a German position north of Warsaw, and captured it. For this action, he was awarded the Order of Glory 3rd class. He was slated to receive it again on 12 September 1944.

Apalkov captured four German soldiers and killed two more after capturing their trench, near Modlin, on 17 January 1945. He subsequently received the Order of Glory 2nd class on 8 February 1945. For the capture of another German trench, in East Prussia, on 18 March 1945, Apalkov was ordered the Order of Glory 1st class on 29 June 1945. With that commendation, by order of the Presidium of the Supreme Soviet, Apalkov was a full bearer of the Order of Glory.

Apalkov continued to serve in the Red Army until 1948.

== Later life ==
From 1956 to 1963, and again from 1964 to 1975, Apalkov worked for the government of the town of Arzgir.

== See also ==
- List of recipients of four Orders of Glory
