= Trunovsky =

Trunovsky (masculine), Trunovskaya (feminine), or Trunovskoye (neuter) may refer to:

- Trunovsky District, a district of Stavropol Krai, Russia
- Trunovsky (rural locality) (Trunovskaya, Trunovskoye), name of several rural localities in Russia
