= Leo Osnas =

Russian Jewish soldier; recipient of the Cross of St. George

A depiction of Osnas winning the Cross of St. George, from a contemporary postcard

Leo Osnas (in some sources Leon; fl. 1914-1962) was a Russian soldier and recipient of the Cross of St. George, the highest award for bravery in the Russian Army. Osnas, a medical student from Wilna, had volunteered for military service and saw action during the First World War. He received his bravery award for saving his regimental colours from being captured by German forces during an action in East Prussia in the early months of the war. The award was made in person by Russian Tsar Nicholas II. In newspaper reports it was stated that Osnas' action had led the Russians to allow Jewish men the right to become officers in the army and navy and for Jewish civilians to receive full citizenship rights. This latter action was not taken.

== Biography ==
Leo (sometimes Leon) Osnas was a Jewish medical student from Vilna (modern-day Vilnius, Lithuania), though sometimes he is reported as being a doctor. He had studied at the Paris University and volunteered for service with the Russian Army after the outbreak of the First World War.

Whilst fighting German forces in East Prussia Osnas saved the colours of his regiment from being captured. He was grievously wounded and his commander sent a message to the doctors treating him that they should do all they could to save the life of "Osnas the Hero". The action was reported in the London press on 4 September 1914.

Osnas recovered and was awarded the Cross of St. George, the Russian Army's highest award for bravery, it was presented to him personally by Tsar Nicholas II. He was the first Russian soldier to be awarded the cross during the war. The Yorkshire Herald remarked that through his bravery Osnas "has won freedom for the Jews in Russia; he has gained for his race the right to become officers in the Russian army and navy, hitherto denied them and he has so delighted the Russian government that it has since proclaimed that henceforth Jews in the Empire shall enjoy full rights of citizenship". The paper further commented that no winner of the Victoria Cross, the British equivalent of the Cross of St. George, had achieved similar results. Despite the reporting the Jews in Russia did not receive full citizenship during the war and continued to suffer violent assaults from civilians looking for scapegoats for Russian defeats on the battlefield.

Osnas survived until at least 1962, when it was reported in a Vilnius publication that he was ill.
