= Koptev =

Koptev (masculine, Russian: Коптев) or Kopteva (feminine, Russian: Коптева) is a Russian surname. Notable people with the surname include:

- Genri Koptev-Gomolov (1926–2007), Russian military officer
- Yuri Koptev (born 1940), Russian engineer and former general director of the Russian Space Agency
