= Agadadash Samedov =

Azerbaijani veteran (1924–2016)

- Ağadadaş Abdulqasım oğlu Səmədov
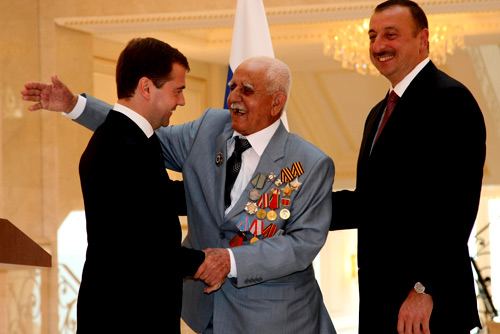
- Samedov with Dmitry Medvedev and Ilham Aliyev.
- Born: March 10, 1924; Lenkeran district, Azerbaijan SSR, Soviet Union
- Died: August 26, 2016 (aged 92)
- Military career
- Allegiance: USSR; Azerbaijan
- Branch: Soviet Armed Forces
- Service years: 1942–1945
- Rank: Sergeant

Agadadash Samedov (Azerbaijani: Ağadadaş Abdulqasım oğlu Səmədov, March 10, 1924 – August 26, 2016) was an Azerbaijani veteran who fought in the Great Patriotic War as a Soviet soldier.

== Early life and career ==
Samedov was born on 10 March 1924 in the Lenkeran District of the Azerbaijan SSR, within the Soviet Union. During World War II, Samedov helped liberate the North Caucasus, Ukraine and other European countries from the Axis powers. In 1942, on Ukrainian territory near Dubno, he remained alone after his squadron had already retreated, defending against the approaching forces. For this feat he received the Order of Glory, 3rd degree. Agadadash Samedov also participated in the Vistula–Oder Offensive and the Battle of Berlin.

On 6 June 1945, Samedov was awarded the Order of Glory (2nd degree) for courage and bravery displayed in the Great Patriotic War.

== Honors ==
- Order of Glory (2nd and 3rd degree)

== Personal life and death ==
Samedov had 13 children, 44 grandchildren and 36 great grandchildren. He died on August 26, 2016, at the age of 92.
