= Duda Enginoev =

Russian Army scout

Duda Edievich Enginoev
- Дуда Эдиевич Энгиноев
- Born: 25 June 1919; Psedakh, Mountain Republic
- Died: 22 October 1979 (aged 60); Belek, Chuy oblast, Kirghiz SSR, USSR
- Military career
- Allegiance: Soviet Union
- Branch: Red Army
- Service years: 1939–1945
- Rank: Senior Sergeant
- Conflicts: World War II; Winter War; Eastern Front
- Awards: Order of Glory, 1st class

Duda Edievich Enginoev (Russian: Дуда Эдиевич Энгиноев; 25 June 1919 – 22 October 1979) was a scout in the Red Army and the only Chechen full bearer of the Order of Glory.

== Early life ==
Enginoev was born on 25 June 1919 to a Chechen peasant family in the village of Psedakh, presently located in the Malgobeksky District of Ingushetia. With only a primary education, he worked on a collective farm before entering the Red Army in the late 1930s. He saw combat in the Winter War.

== World War II ==
Starting in July 1941, Enginoev was on the front lines of World War II. In 1942 he was seriously wounded, but he eventually returned to combat. On 9 April 1944 he took out three enemy soldiers and obtained valuable documents while on a reconnaissance mission, and later that month he was awarded the Order of Glory 3rd class for bravery in obtaining the documents and delivering them to division command. In September he captured multiple retreating enemy soldiers and officers, resulting in getting an Order of Glory 2nd class on 16 October 1944. He became a full bearer of the order on 10 April 1945 for actions on 24-29 January 1945 in Poland, where he and his platoon killed many axis soldiers and took ten captive.

== Later life ==
After being demobilized from the military in 1946 he struggled to find his family throughout Central Asia, where the Chechen nation had been deported to in 1944. Eventually he found his surviving family in Belek, Kyrgyzstan, where he lived in exile until his death on 22 October 1979.

== Awards ==
- Order of Glory 1st class (10 April 1945)
- Order of Glory 2nd class (16 October 1944)
- Order of Glory 3rd class (27 April 1944)
- Order of the Red Star (16 May 1945)
- campaign and jubilee medals
