= Ribbon of Saint George =

Russian military and patriotic symbol

Versions
- Flag of the Saint George Ribbon.

- The Ribbon of Saint George (tied). The pattern is thought to symbolise fire and gunpowder. It is also thought to be derived from the colours of the original Russian imperial coat of arms (black eagle on a golden background).
- Adopted: Order of Saint George, established in 1769

The ribbon of Saint George (also known as Saint George's ribbon, the Georgian ribbon; Russian: Георгиевская лента, romanized: Georgiyevskaya lenta; and the Guards' ribbon in a Soviet context) (Note: See Terminology for further information) is a Russian military symbol consisting of a black and orange bicolour pattern, with three black and two orange stripes.

It appears as a component of many high military decorations awarded by the Russian Empire, the Soviet Union and the current Russian Federation.

In the early 21st century, the ribbon of Saint George has come to be used as an awareness ribbon for commemorating the veterans of the Eastern Front of the Second World War (known in Russia and some post-Soviet countries as the Great Patriotic War). It is the primary symbol used in association with Victory Day. It enjoys wide popularity in Russia as a patriotic symbol. Since 2014, the symbol has become much more controversial in certain post-Soviet states such as Ukraine and the Baltic states, due to its association with pro-Russian and separatist sentiment, especially following the start of the 2022 Russian invasion of Ukraine where it has been associated with Russian nationalism and militarism.

== Terminology ==
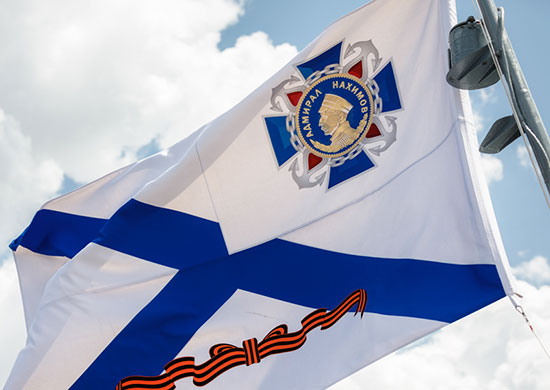
Russian naval flag with the Order of Nakhimov and the Guards Ribbon on the cruiser Moskva (2016)

As the ribbon of Saint George has been used by different Russian governments, multiple terms exist for it in the Russian language. The ribbon first received a formal name in the Russian Empire, in documents prescribing its usage as an award: the Georgian ribbon (Russian: георгиевская лента, georgiyevskaya lenta). The old Tsarist term was used in the Soviet Union to describe the black-orange ribbon in the Soviet award system, but only in non-official contexts, such as the Military History Journal published by the Soviet Ministry of Defense. Formally, the black-orange ribbon on the badges, flags and cap tallies of Guards units was called the Guards ribbon (Russian: гвардейская лента, gvardeyskaya lenta), while the same ribbon as it was used in other Soviet awards had no official name. In the military terminology of the Russian Federation, both Tsarist and Soviet terms are used.

The modern term георгиевская ленточка (georgiyevskaya lentochka, distinguished from the Tsarist term by the usage of the diminutive) comes from the Russian 2005 program of the same name, and is used to refer to the mass-produced awareness ribbons as opposed to the original military awards. The usage of the epithet Georgian in reference to that ribbon is subject to controversy in Russia, due to its Tsarist connotations, and thus sometimes the term Guards ribbon is used to refer to the modern ribbons as well, as they are meant to commemorate the Soviet period of Russian history.

== History ==
=== Origins ===
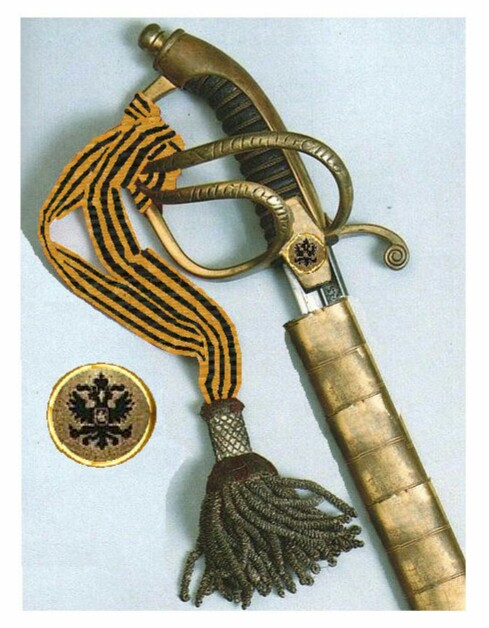
Gold Sword for Bravery, one of the first instances of the Georgian ribbon used independently.

The Georgian ribbon emerged as part of the Order of Saint George, established in 1769 as the highest military decoration of Imperial Russia (and re-established in 1998 by Presidential decree signed by then President of Russia Boris Yeltsin). While the Order of Saint George was normally not a collective award, the ribbon was sometimes granted to regiments and units that performed brilliantly during wartime and constituted an integral part of some collective battle honours (such as banners and pennants). When not awarded the full Order, some distinguished officers were granted ceremonial swords, adorned with the Georgian ribbon.

In 1806, distinctive Georgian banners were introduced as a further battle honour awarded to meritorious Guards and Leib Guard regiments. These banners had the Cross of Saint George as their finials and were adorned with 4.44 cm wide Georgian ribbons. It remained the highest collective military award in the Imperial Russian Army until the Revolution in 1917.

In the original statute of the Order of Saint George, written in 1769, the currently orange stripes of the ribbon were described as yellow; however, they were frequently rendered as orange in practice, and the orange colour was later formalised in the 1913 statute. The colours are said to symbolise fire and gunpowder of war, the death and resurrection of Saint George, or the colours of the original Russian imperial coat of arms (black double-headed eagle on a golden escutcheon). Another theory is that they are, in fact, German in origin, derived from the or and sable stripe patterns found on the heraldry of the House of Ascania, from which Catherine II originated, or the County of Ballenstedt, the house's ancient demesne.

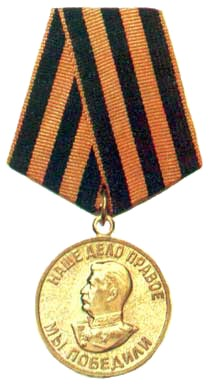
The association of the Georgian ribbon to Soviet victory in the Second World War stems from the Soviet "For the Victory over Germany" medal.

The original Georgian ribbons disappeared alongside all other Tsarist awards after the October Revolution, although wearing a previously earned Cross of Saint George was allowed. However, the symbol would reappear during the Second World War, as a symbol of office for the newly established Soviet Guards units, whose badges and banners were adorned with black and orange ribbons in a similar manner to old Imperial regiments Later, the same ribbon would be used for the Order of Glory (Russian: Орден Славы, Orden Slavy), an award given for bravery to soldiers and non-commissioned officers similar to the Tsarist Cross of Saint George, and the medal "For the Victory over Germany" (Russian: За победу над Германией, Za pobedu nad Germaniyey), awarded to almost all veterans who participated in Eastern Front campaigns. As part of the original Tsarist awards, the ribbon was also used by the collaborationist Russian Liberation Army.

After the war, the ribbon would be sometimes used in postcards commemorating the veterans of the war; however, the ribbon did not hold the public significance it has today.

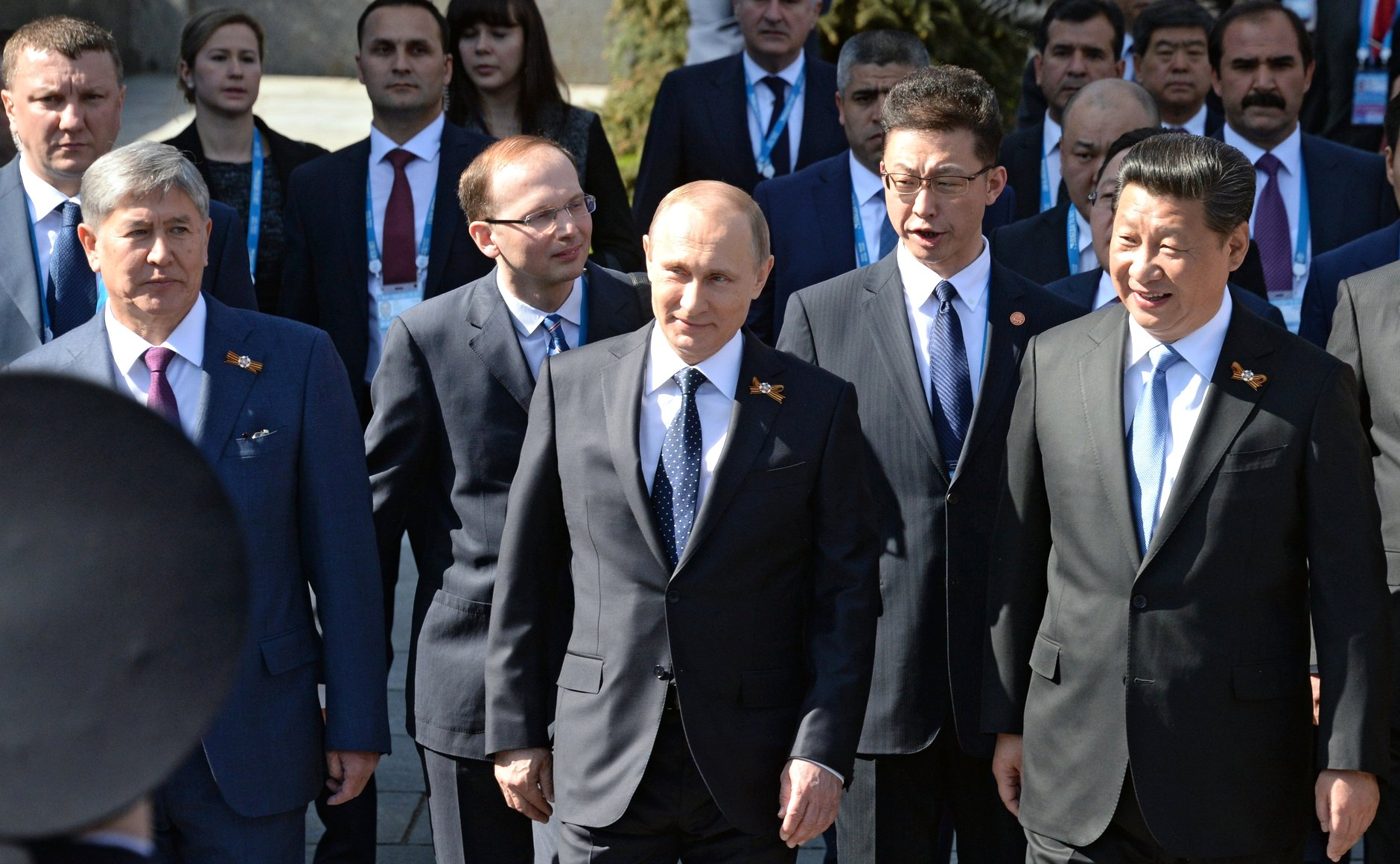
Presidents of Russia, China and Kyrgyzstan with Saint George ribbons during the 2015 Moscow Victory Day Parade

=== 21st century ===
==== Russia ====
In 2005, to mark the 60th anniversary of the Soviet Union's victory over Germany (Victory Day; 9 May 1945), the Russian state-run news agency RIA Novosti and the youth civic organization РООСПМ «Студенческая Община» launched a campaign that called on volunteers to distribute ribbons in the streets ahead of Victory Day. Since then, civilians in Russia and other former republics of the Soviet Union have worn the ribbon as an act of commemoration and remembrance. For the naming of the ribbons the diminutive form is used: георгиевская ленточка (georgiyevskaya lentochka, "small George ribbon"). Since 2005 the ribbon is distributed each year all over Russia and around the world in advance of 9 May and is on that day widely to be seen on wrists, lapels, and cars.

Novaya Gazeta columnist Yulia Latynina and other journalists have speculated the Russian government introduced the ribbon as a public-relations response to the 2004 Orange Revolution in Ukraine in which demonstrators had adopted orange ribbons as their symbol.

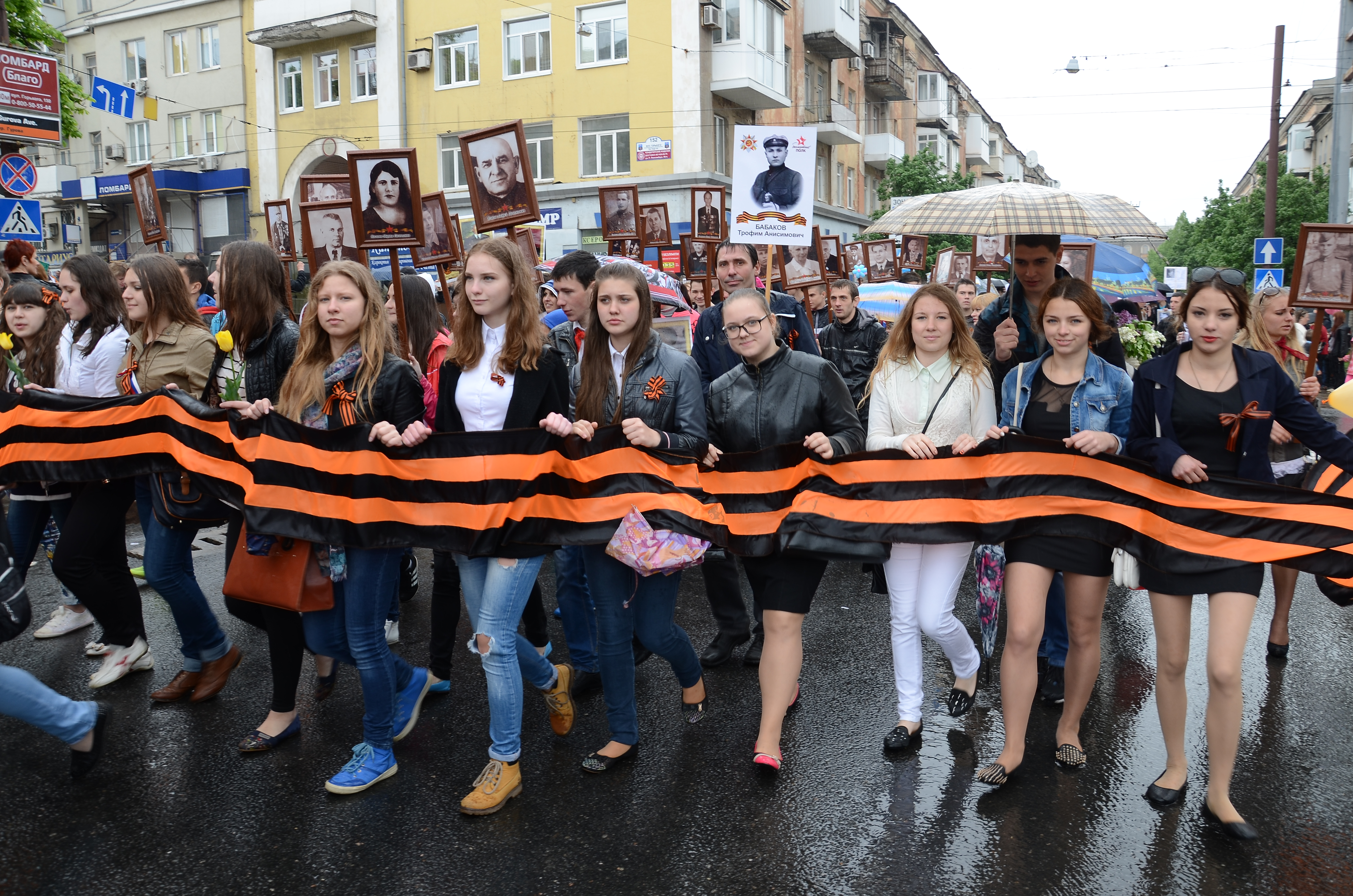
Individuals in Donetsk, Donetsk People's Republic carrying portraits of their ancestors and participants in World War II alongside a ribbon of St George, 9 May 2015

Subsequently, Russian communist, nationalist and government loyalist groups have adopted the ribbon. During the 2011–2013 Russian protests, protestors demonstrating against electoral fraud in the 2011 elections wore white ribbons. Supporters of Putin would counter-protest wearing Saint George's ribbons. On 28 April 2016, a group of people from the Nashi youth movement wearing St. George ribbons attacked a school competition organized by the Memorial society, pouring a toxic solution of Brilliant Green on writer Ludmila Ulitskaya and other guests and assaulting a journalist. The Russian anti-Western nationalist group National Liberation Movement (Russian: Национально-освободительное движение - NOD) has adopted a flag of orange and black horizontal stripes as its symbol.

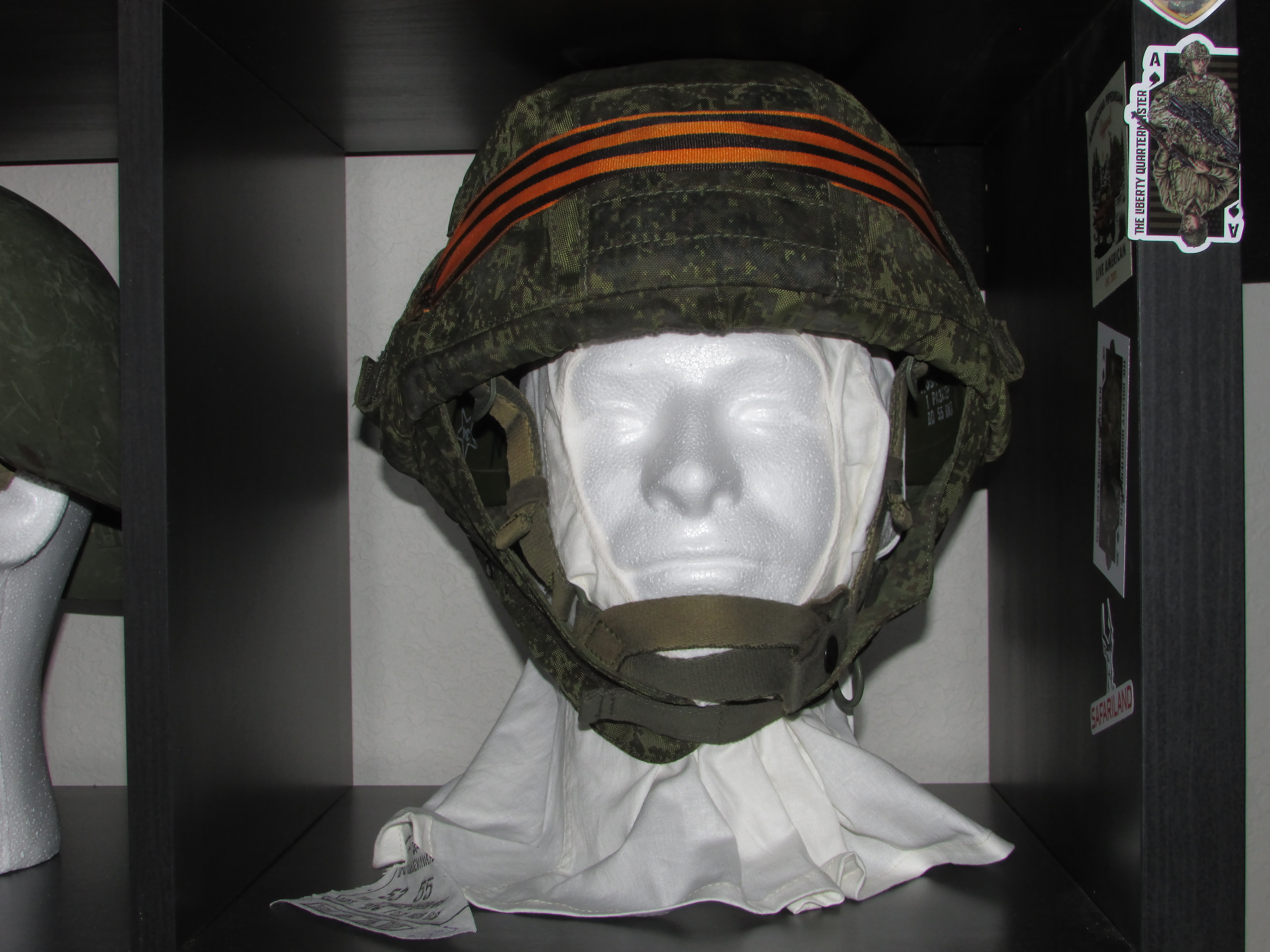
A Russian VDV 6B47 helmet adorned with the ribbon of St. George

The “Z” symbol in the colors of the ribbon

During the 2022 Russian invasion of Ukraine, the colors of the ribbon were used in conjunction with the "Z" military symbol, which became a pro-war symbol that appeared across Russia. Russian soldiers in Ukraine have been seen decorating their combat uniforms with St. George ribbons. The St. George's ribbon is used as part of the uniform of the Russian Airborne Forces.

In December 2022, president Vladimir Putin signed a law making desecration of the ribbon a criminal offense, with the law designating the ribbon as an official symbol of military glory that can only be used in events "dedicated to notable dates in Russia" or "aimed at patriotic and morally-spiritual education of Russian citizens".

==== Ukraine ====
During the events of 2014 in Ukraine, anti-Maidan activists and the pro-Russian population of Ukraine (especially in the south-east regions) used the ribbon as a symbol of pro-Russian and separatist sentiment. Pro-Russian separatists in eastern Ukraine used the ribbon as a symbol of loyalty, while Ukrainians loyalists used the derogatory term "kolorady" (Russian: колорады; Ukrainian: колоради) to describe pro-Russian separatists in reference to the Colorado potato beetle, and the ribbon was referred to as the "Colorado ribbon" (Russian: колорадская лента, koloradskaya lenta; Ukrainian: колорадська стрічка, kolorads'ka strichka).

Since 2014, incidents over the ribbon would occur during Victory Day celebrations on 9 May.

In April 2014, the authorities of Kropyvnytskyi banned the symbol from Victory Day celebrations "in order to prevent provocations between the activists of different movements". Instead, only Ukrainian state symbols would be used. The next month Cherkasy urged veterans and supporters not to wear the ribbon or any other party symbols.

The Ukrainian government replaced the ribbon with a red-and-black remembrance poppy, like those associated with Remembrance Day in Western Europe, in 2014.

On 16 May 2017, the ribbon was officially banned in the country, with those who produce or promote the symbol subject to fines or temporary arrest. According to Speaker Andriy Parubiy (People's Front), the symbol had become a symbol of "Russia's aggression and occupation of Ukraine".

==== Belarus ====
On 5 May 2014, the Belarusian Republican Youth Union encouraged activists not to use the ribbon. Other officials reported that the decision not to use the symbol was related to the situation in Ukraine, "where the ribbon is used by militants and terrorists". In time for Victory Day 2015, the government introduced a new ribbon, featuring red and green of the Flag of Belarus.

==== Canada ====
During preparation for the first Victory Day parade in the Canadian city of Winnipeg on 10 May 2014, the Russian embassy distributed Ribbons of Saint George to participants. The move was considered controversial to the local Ukrainian community in view of the ongoing events in Ukraine.

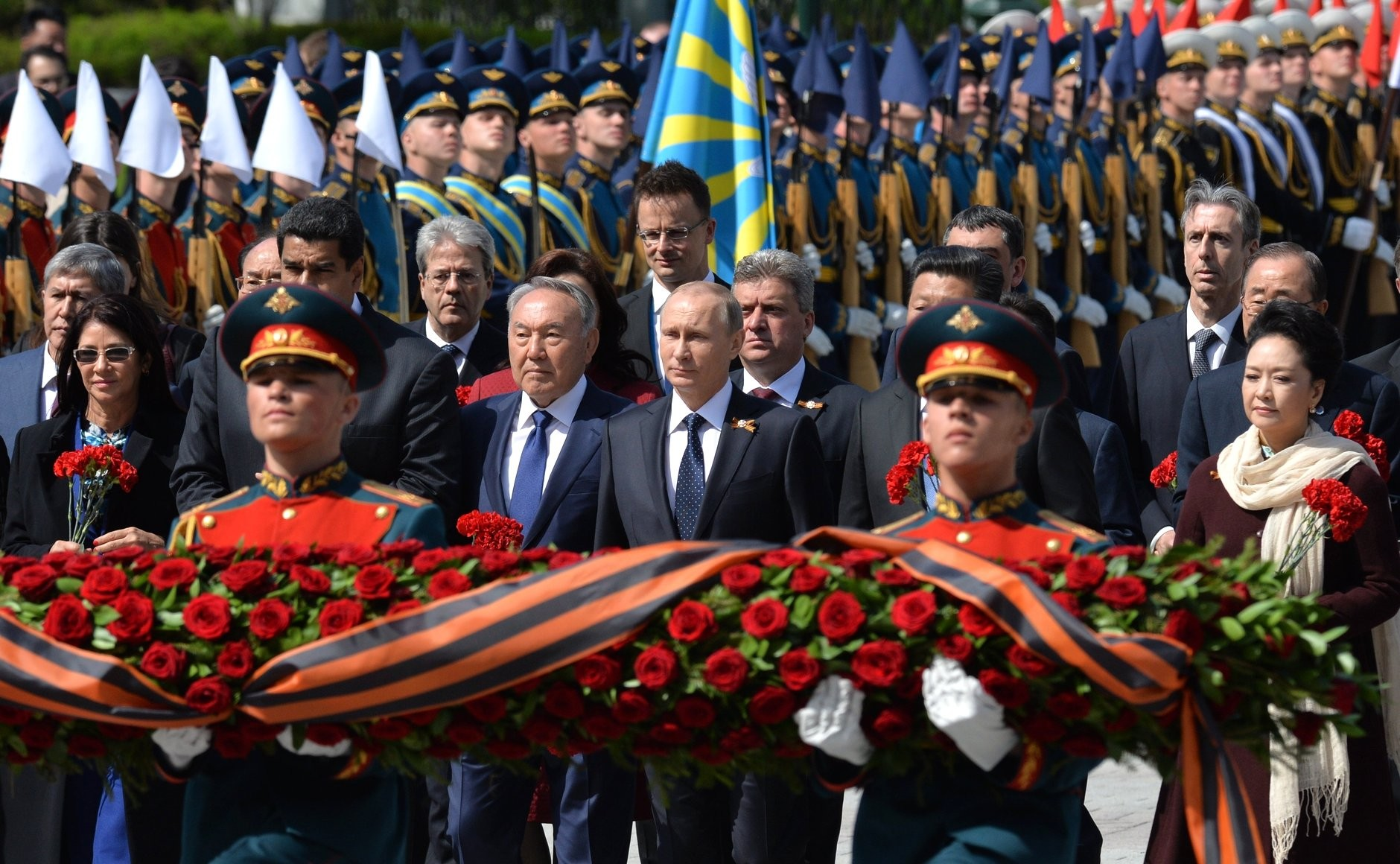
Then-president Nursultan Nazarbayev of Kazakhstan during the 2015 Moscow Victory Day Parade

==== Latvia ====
Latvia's Parliament has approved a ban on the public display of Nazi and Soviet symbols, including swastikas and the hammer and sickle, and the singing and promotion of fascist and communist anthems and ideologies. On 11 November 2021, Lāčplēsis Day, the Saeima approved an amendment of the law on Security and Public Entertainment and Festive Events banning the use of the ribbon in public events.

==== Lithuania ====
The ban on similar grounds to that in Latvia was discussed after the Russian annexation of Crimea. The ribbon was finally banned, along with "Z" and "V" military symbols, in response to the 2022 Russian invasion of Ukraine.

==== Moldova ====
On 7 April 2022, the Moldovan Parliament voted to ban the ribbon following the 2022 Russian invasion of Ukraine. The military symbols "Z" and "V" were also banned.

==== Estonia ====
The Riigikogu passed legislation to ban the use of St George Ribbon after Russia invaded Ukraine on 24 February 2022. The law also provides that it is not allowed to publicly exhibit symbols connected with the commission of an act of aggression, genocide, a crime against humanity or a war crime in a way that expresses support to Nazi or justifies such activities. This is punishable by a fine of up to 300 fine units or €1200, or detention. If such an act is committed by a legal person, it is punishable by a fine of up to €32,000.

== Gallery ==
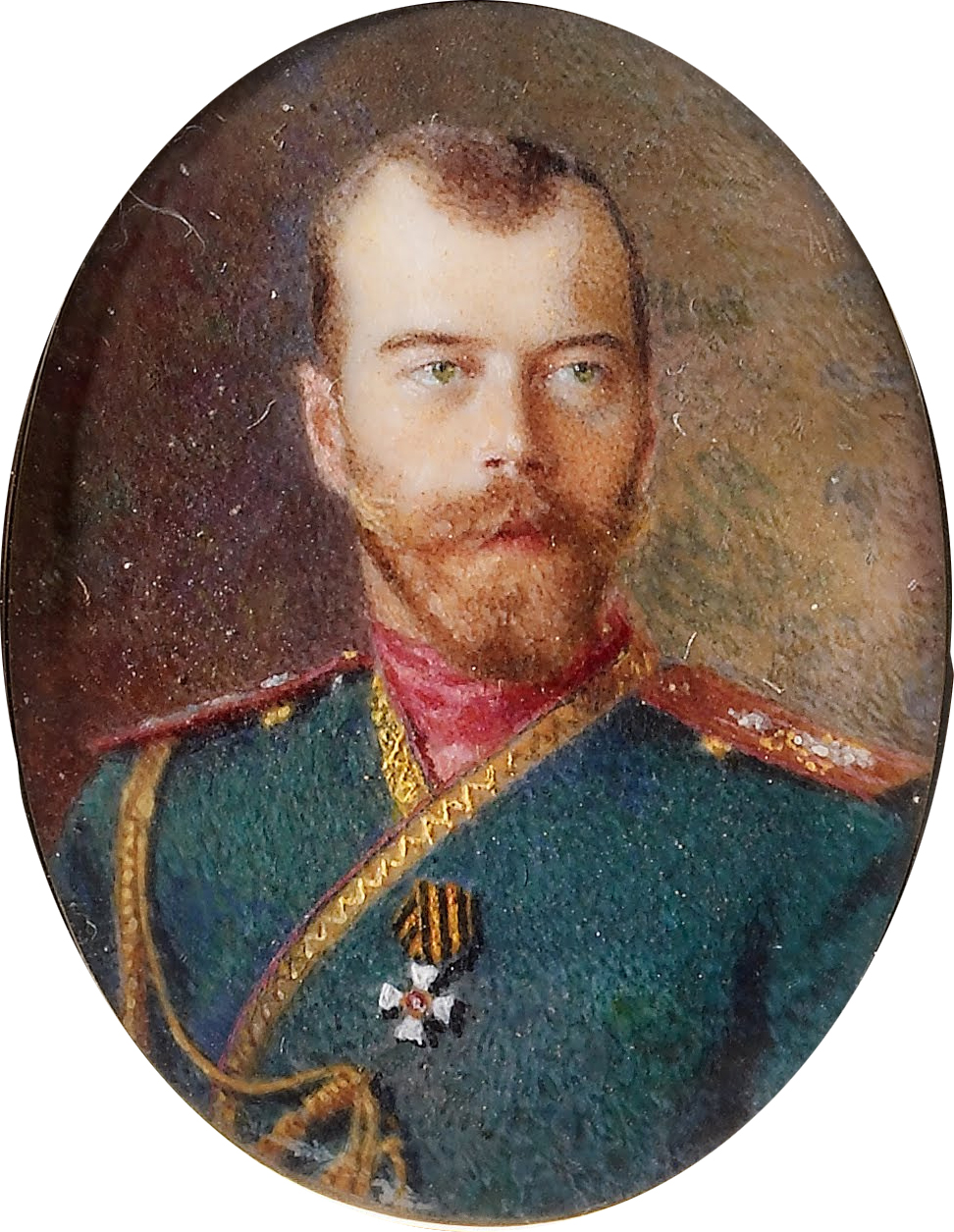
Nicholas II of Russia was a recipient of the Order of St. George (Fourth Class)

Catherine II wearing the Order of St. George sash

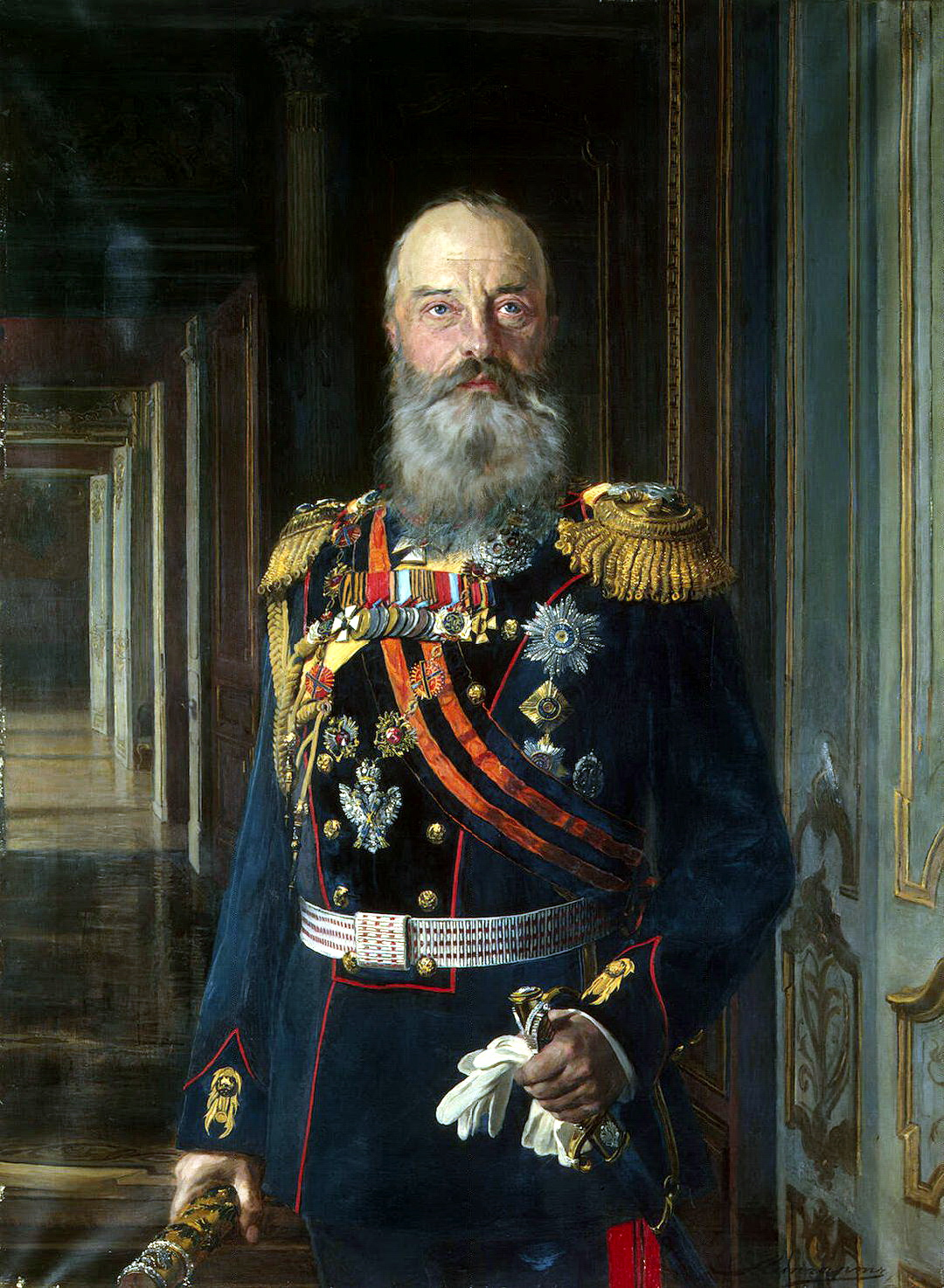
Grand Duke Michael Nikolaevich of Russia with the Order of St. George sash (first class)

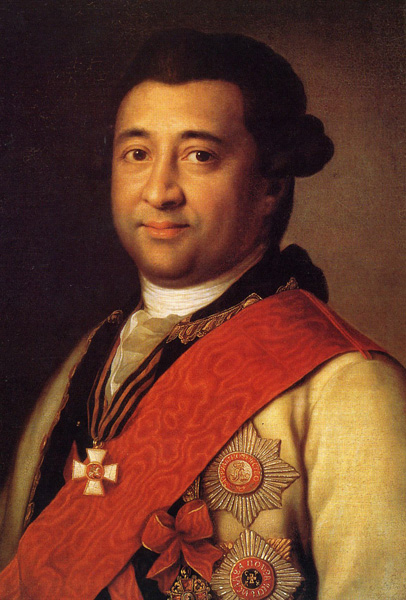
Ivan Gannibal with the Ribbon of St. George

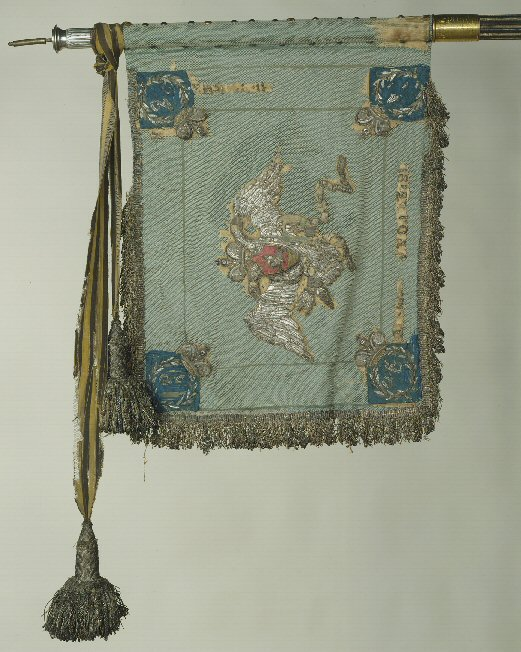
Saint George Standard of the Life Guard Cuirassier Regiment 1817

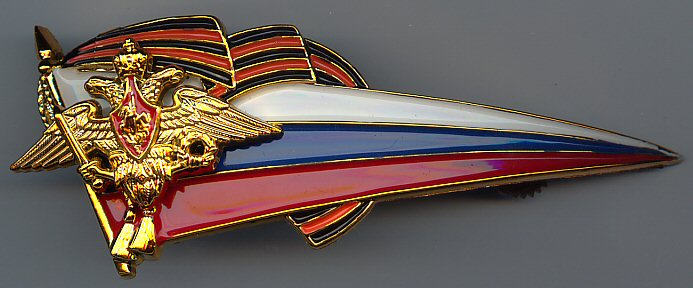
Beret badge with ribbon of St George of a Russian Federation Guards unit

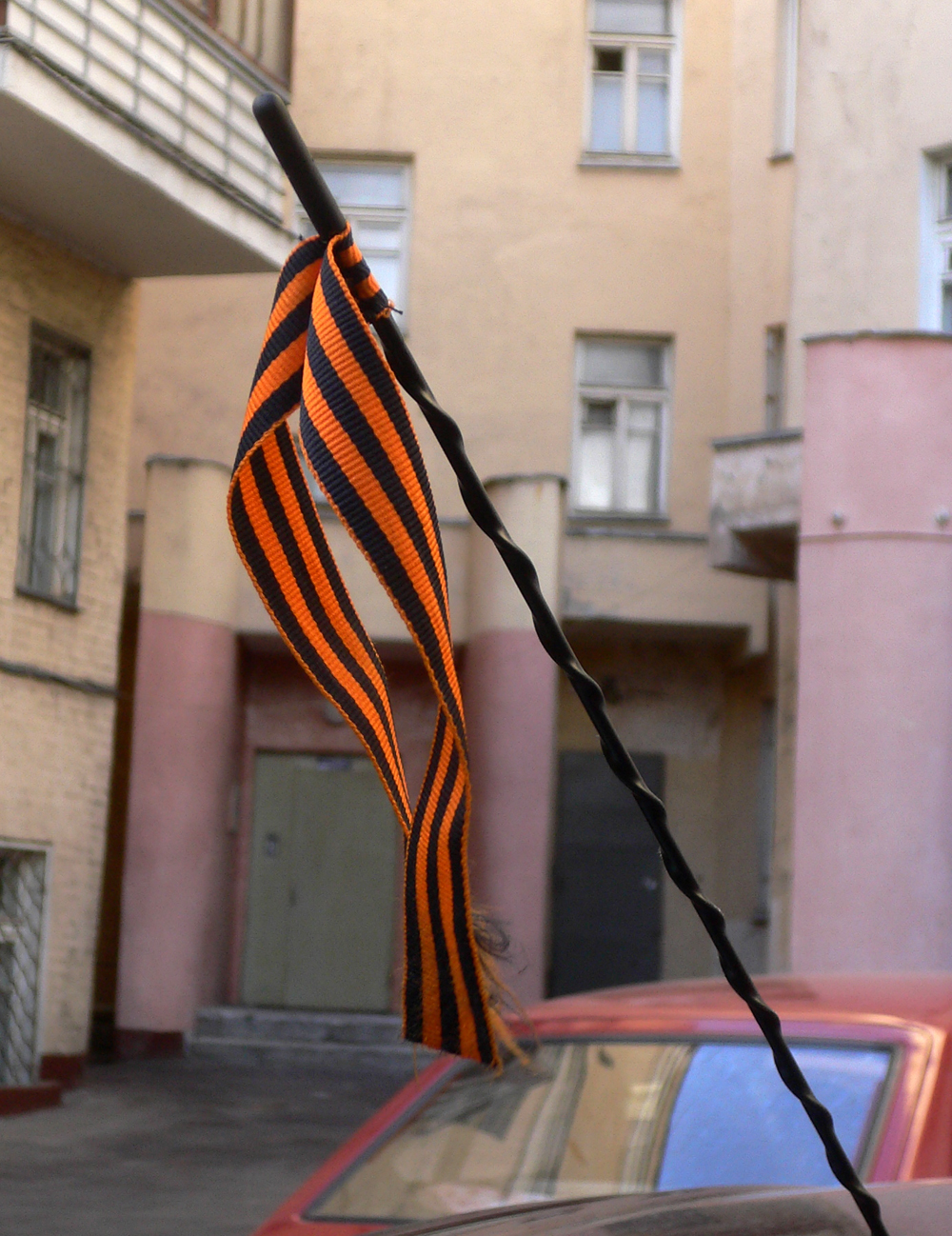
Ribbon of Saint George on a car antenna, Moscow, May 2008

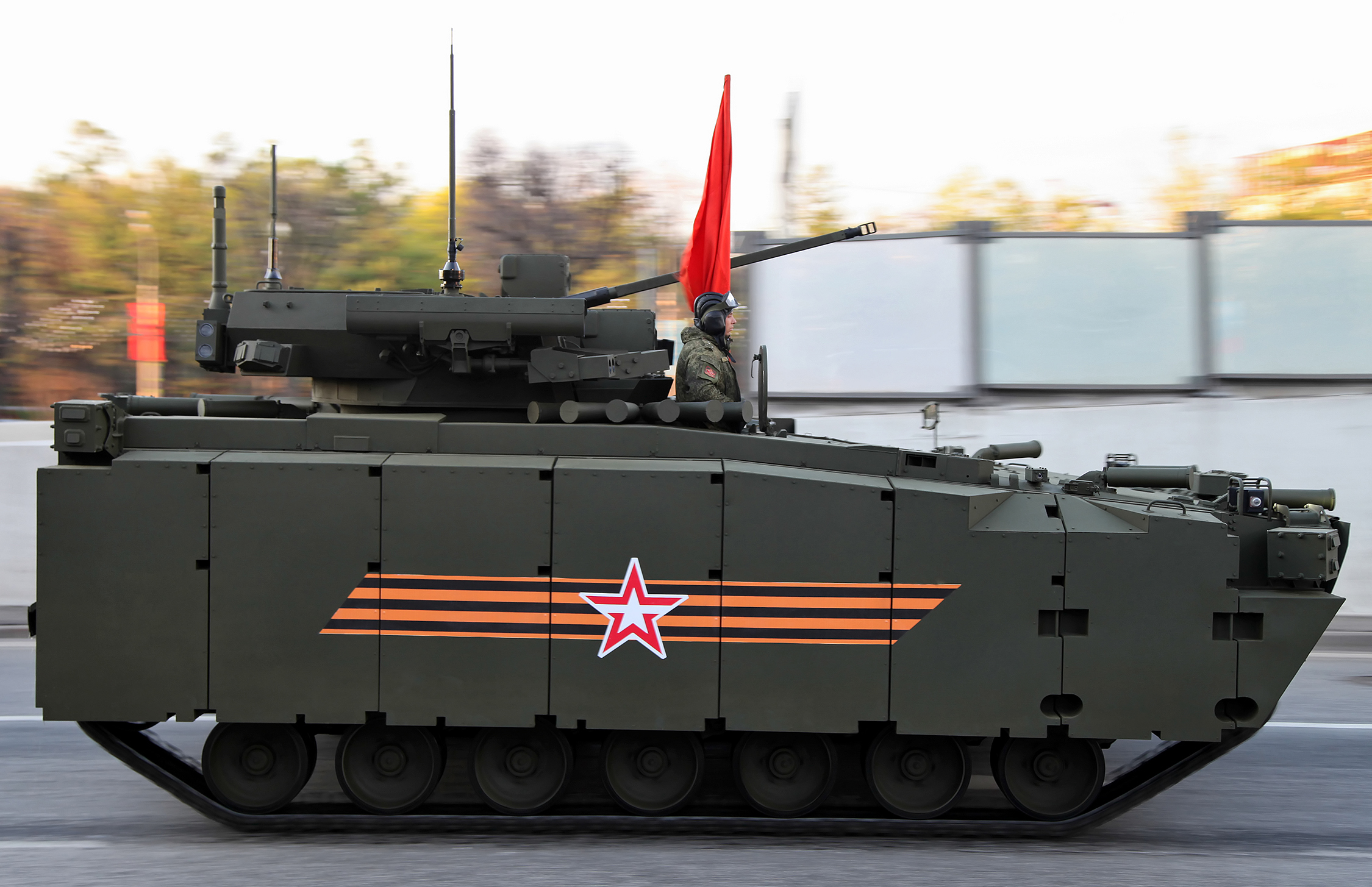
Ribbon of Saint George decal on the Kurganets-25

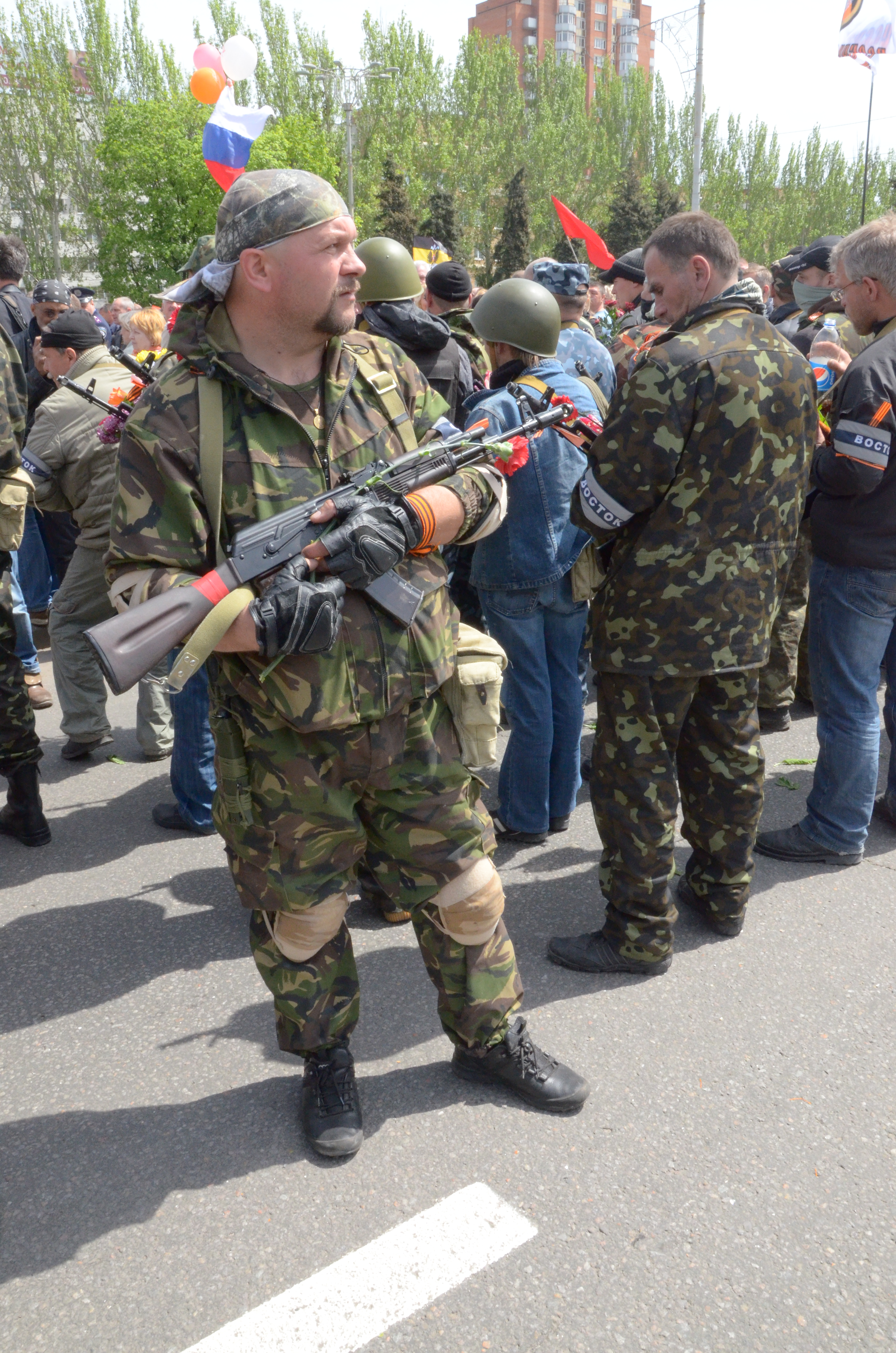
Pro-Russian separatist Vostok Battalion member wearing a Saint George ribbon armband

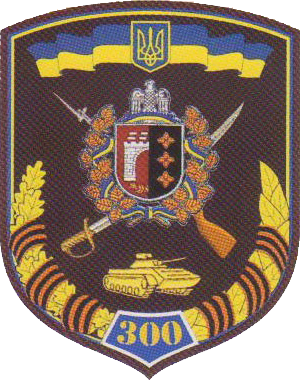
Shoulder sleeve insignia of the 300th Mechanized Regiment (Ukraine) (disbanded in 2013)

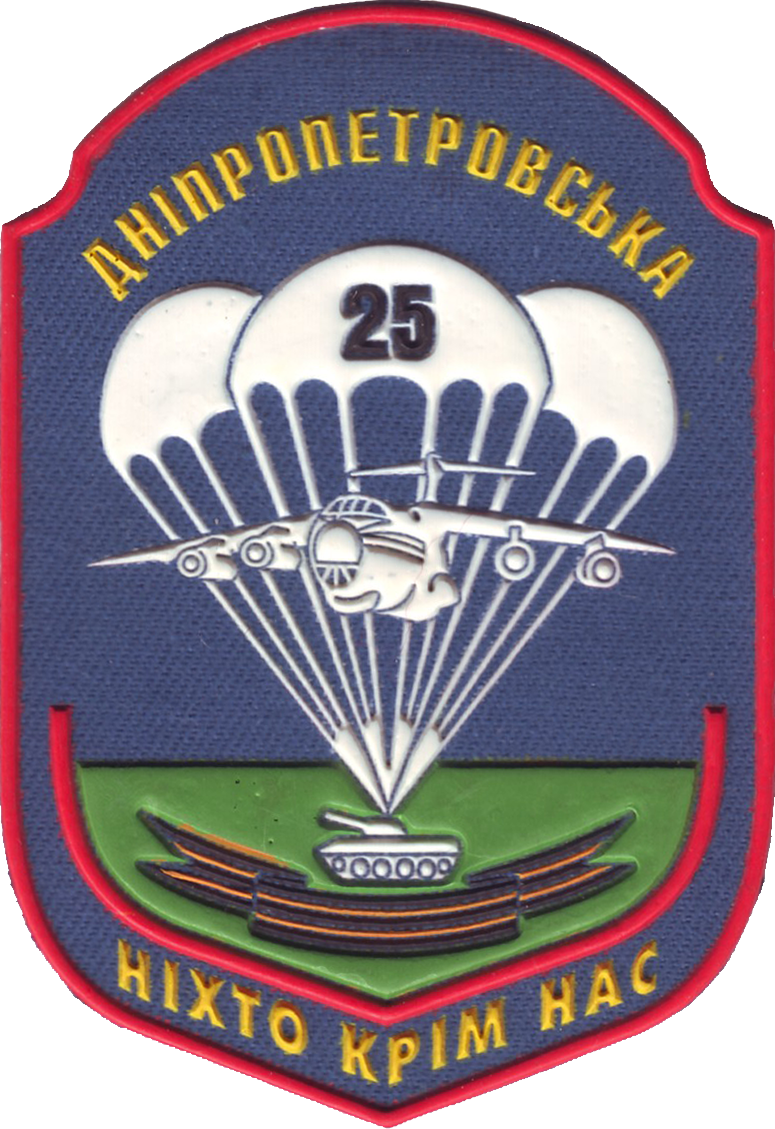
Former insignia of the 25th Airborne Brigade (Ukraine)

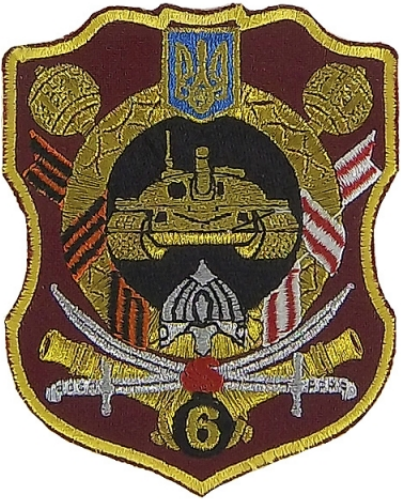
Sleeve patch of the 6th Army Corps (Ukraine) (disbanded in 2013)

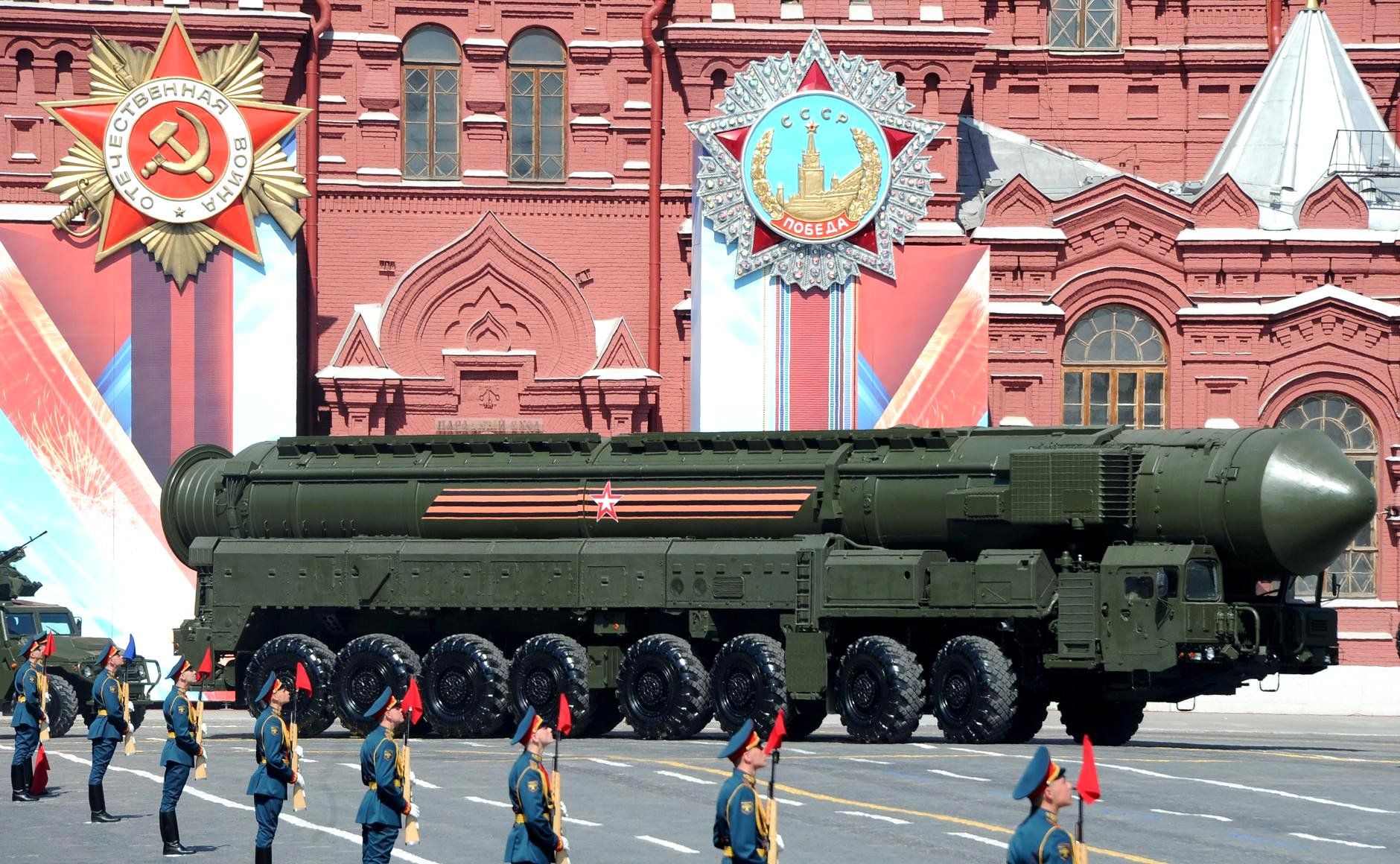
Topol-M participating in a military parade on Red Square on Soviet-Russian Victory Day

Z-shaped Saint George ribbon used in the 2022 invasion of Ukraine with the hashtag: #СвоихНеБросаем (#SvoikhNeBrosaem; "We don't abandon our own")

Red Star and ribbon of Saint George decal on Russian military vehicles

=== Flags ===
On July 21, 1992, by the Decree of the President of Russia under Boris Yeltsin, the need for new naval banners for the Russian Federation was created under decree No. 798. Article 1, section 2 states the description of the "Guards naval flag" with the "Guards Ribbon" located in the middle of the lower half of the flag, symmetrically relative to the middle vertical line of the flag. The usage of the Soviet term "Guards Ribbon" in modern Russian laws were only in reference of the Guards units of the Soviet Navy. These units were subsequently acquired by the newly formed Russian Navy after the collapse of the Soviet Union.

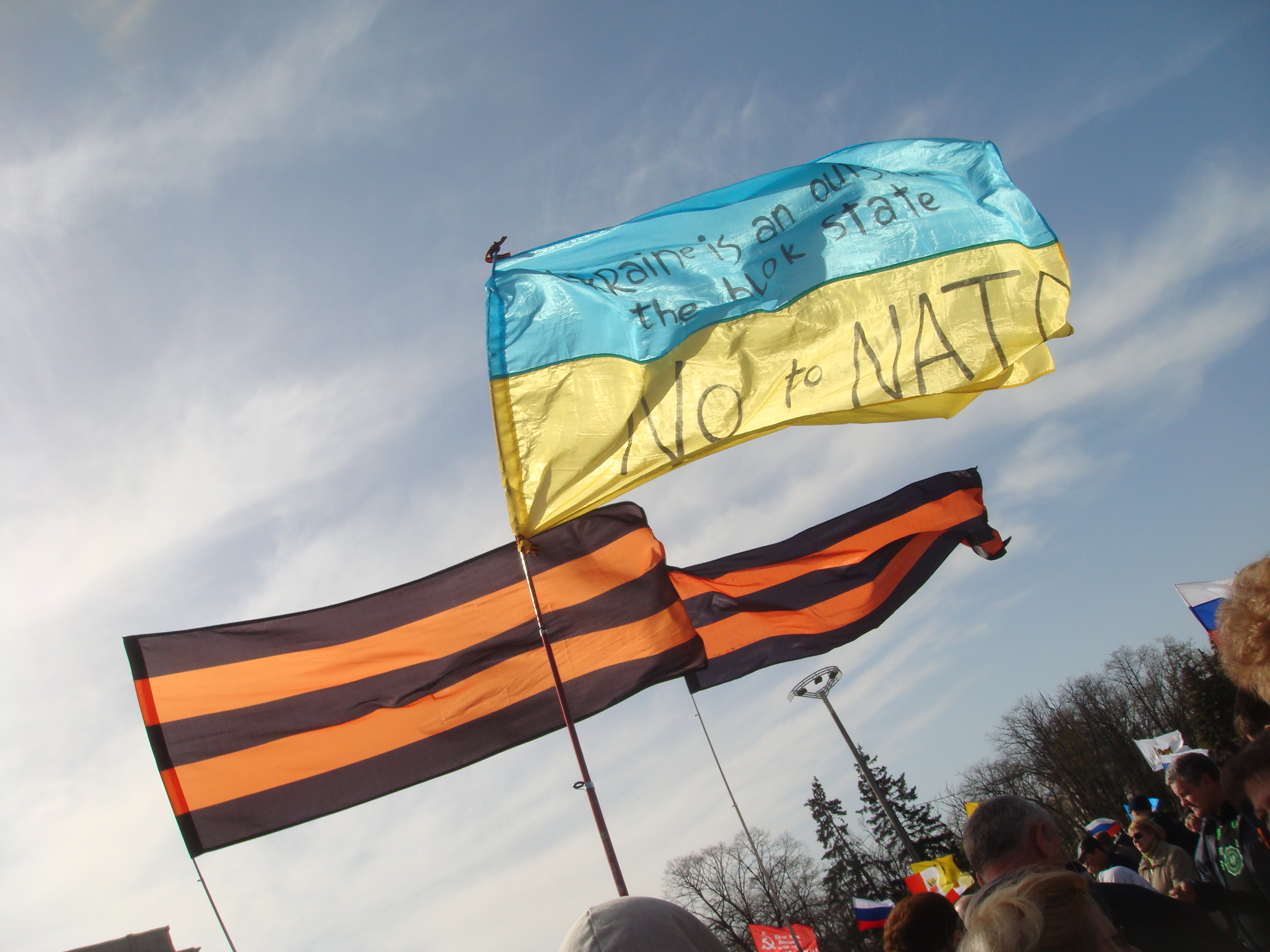
Pro-Russian demonstration in Odesa in 2014

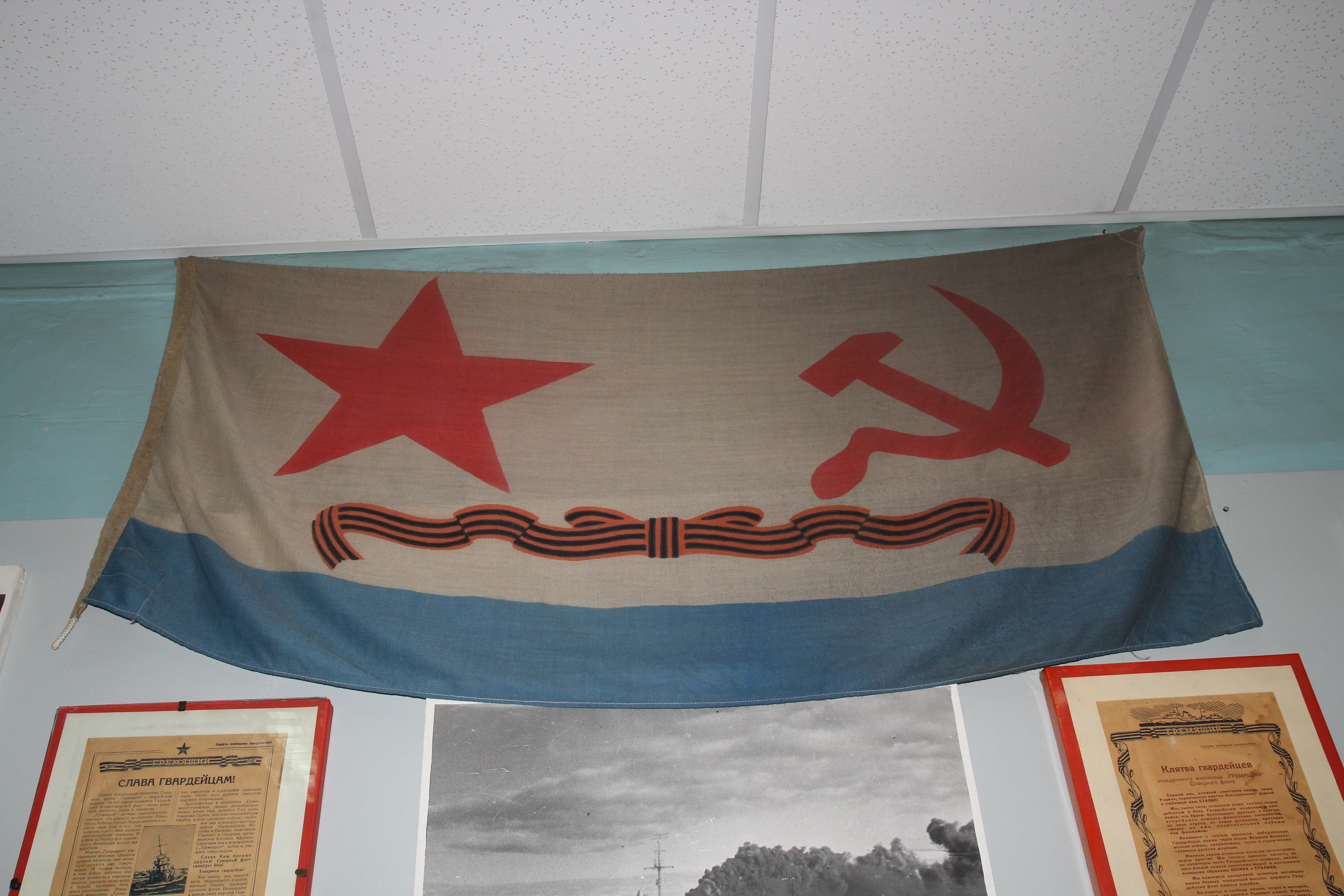
1942–1950 Soviet Guards Naval Flag

First Guards naval flag of the Russian Navy, 1992–2000

Second version of the Guards naval flag, reverted to the historical color of the original St Andrews's flag, 2000

=== Medals ===
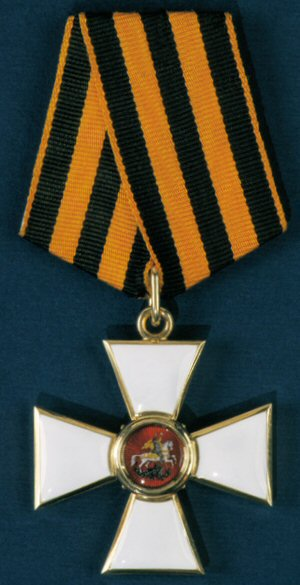
Russian Federation Order of Saint George 4th class

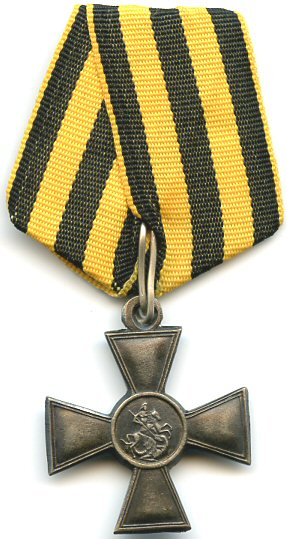
Imperial Cross of Saint George 3rd class 1807 – 1917 (enlisted award)

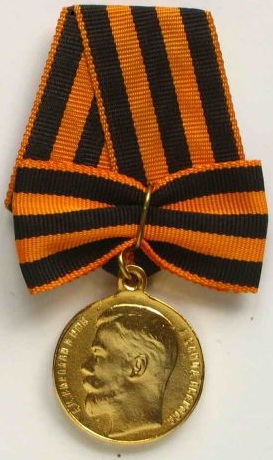
George Medal 1st class

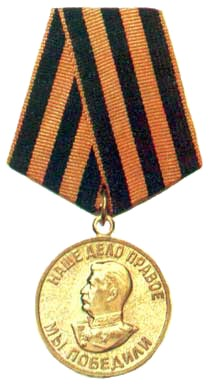
Soviet Medal "For Victory over Germany in the Great Patriotic War 1941–1945"

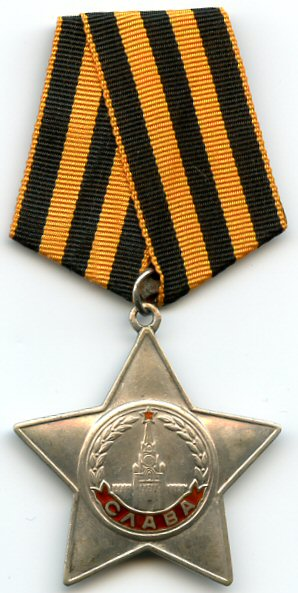
Soviet Order of Glory 3rd class

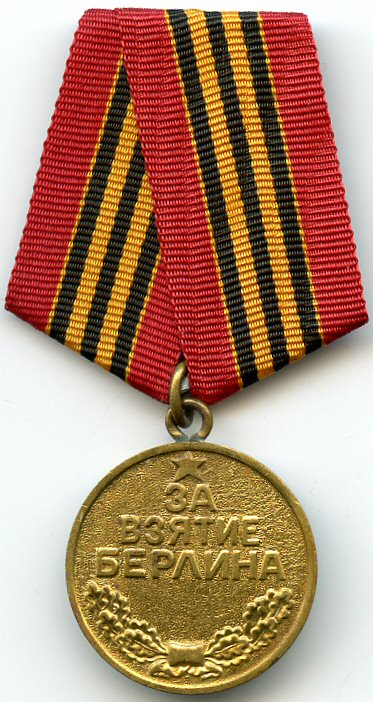
Medal "For the Capture of Berlin"

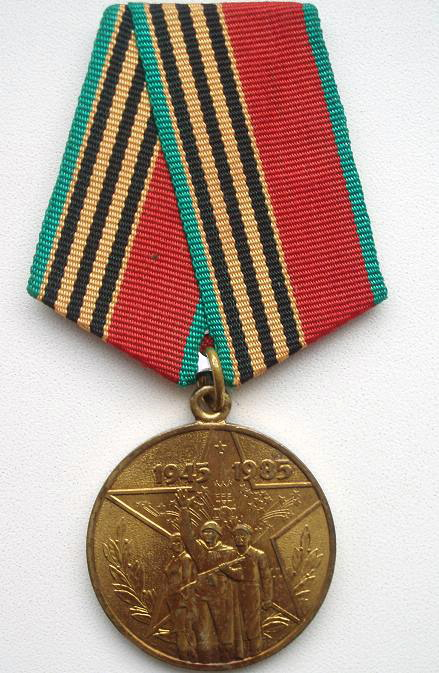
Jubilee Medal "Forty Years of Victory in the Great Patriotic War 1941–1945"

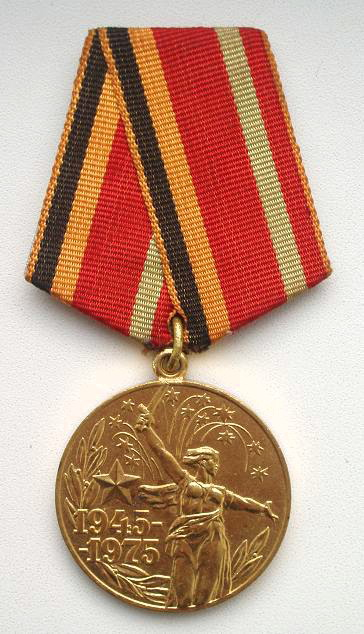
Jubilee Medal "Thirty Years of Victory in the Great Patriotic War 1941–1945"

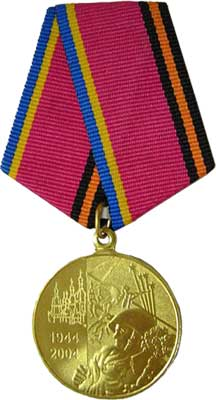
60 Years of Ukraine's Liberation from Nazi Invaders Jubilee Medal

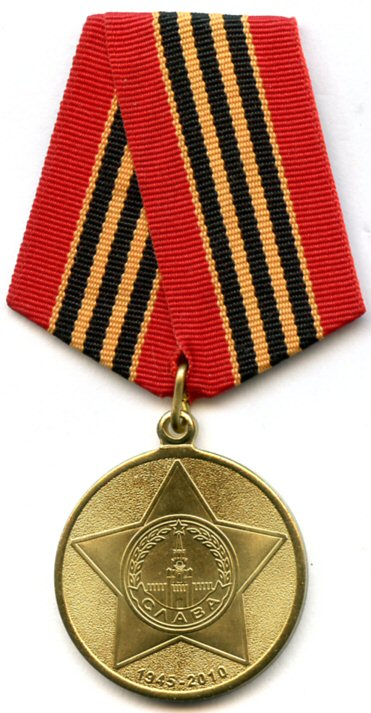
Jubilee Medal "65 Years of Victory in the Great Patriotic War 1941–1945"

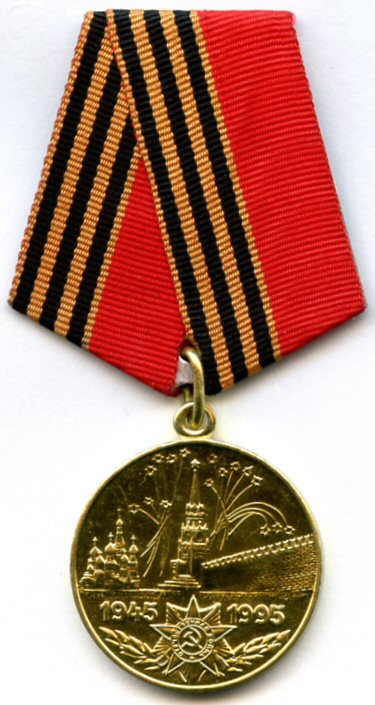
50 Years of Victory in the Great Patriotic War

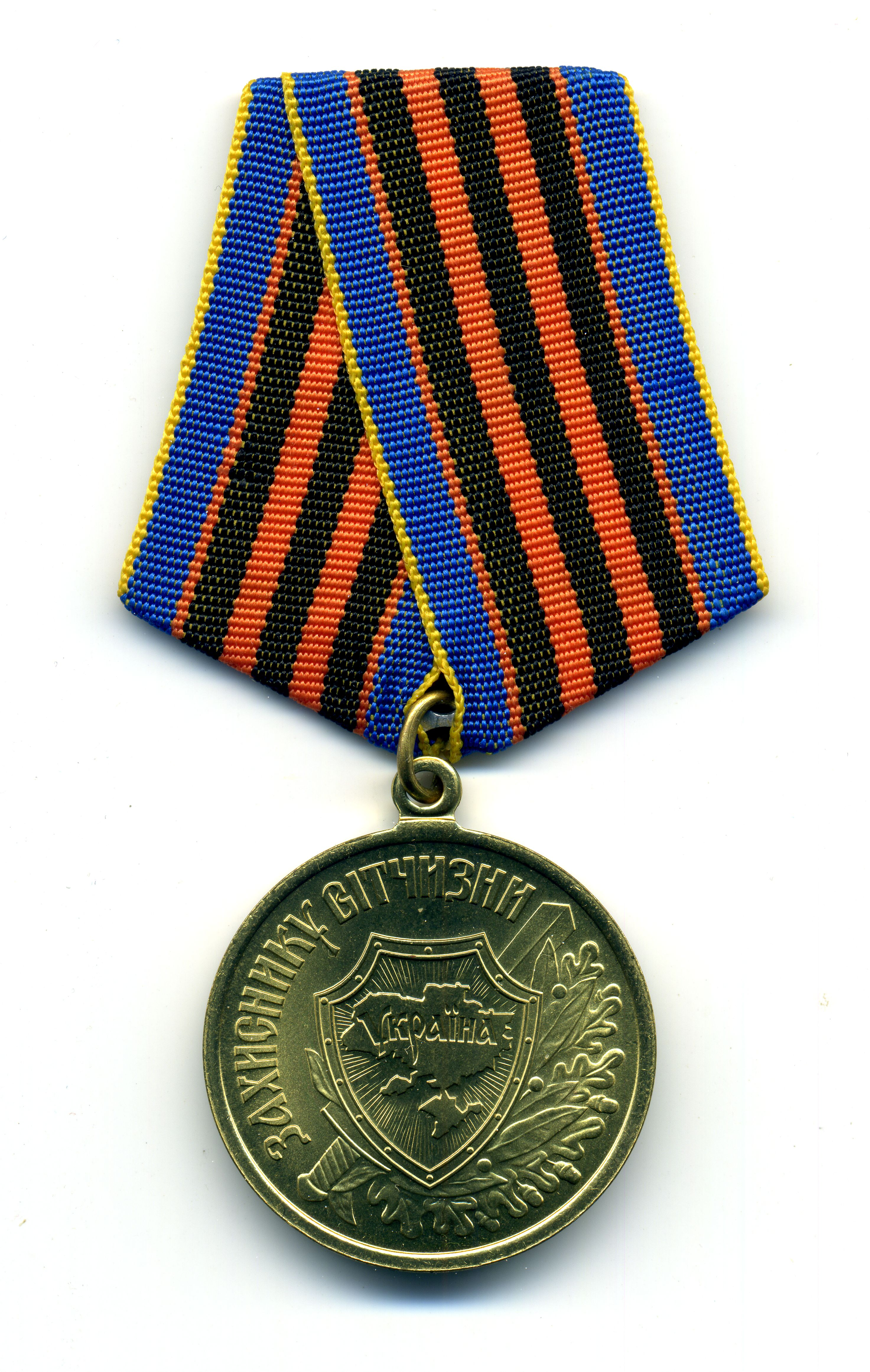
Defender of the Motherland Medal (Ukraine) 1999–2015

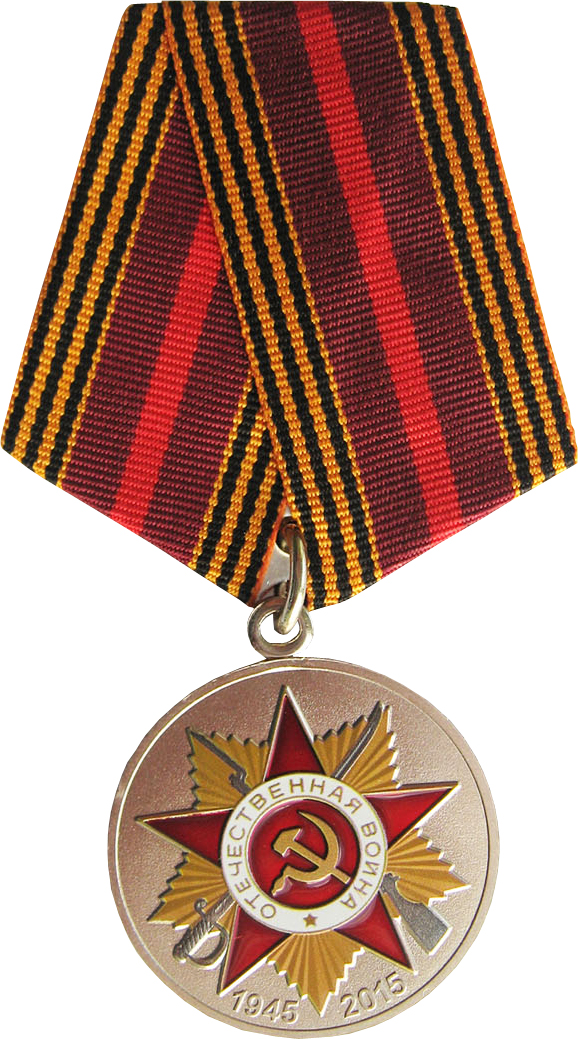
Jubilee Medal "70 Years of Victory in the Great Patriotic War 1941–1945"

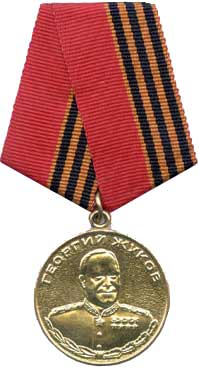
Medal of Zhukov

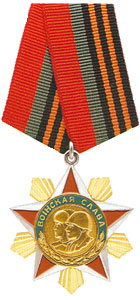
Order of Military Glory (Belarus)

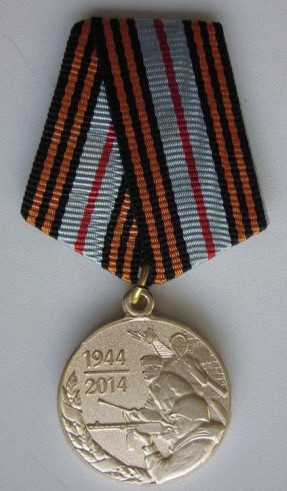
Jubilee medal in honor of the 70th anniversary of liberation of Belarus from Nazi invaders

=== Guards Badge ===
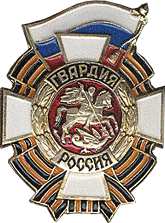
Guards badge of the Armed Forces of the Russian Federation

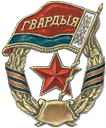
Guards badge of the Armed Forces of Belarus

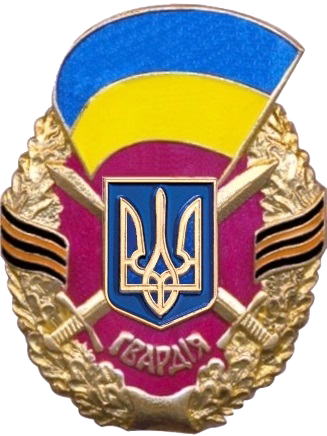
Guards badge of the Armed Forces of Ukraine, established in 2005, removed in 2016

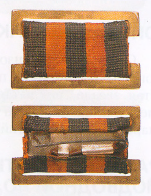
Guards badge for the Soviet Navy

== See also ==
- Soviet imagery during the Russo-Ukrainian War
- Z (military symbol)
- Russian Guards
- Order of Glory
- Awards and decorations of the Russian Federation
- Green ribbon, a symbol used by protesters against the 2022 Russian invasion of Ukraine
