= Evgeniy Chuikov =

Soviet painter (1924–2000)

Evgeniy Vasilievich Chuikov (Russian: Евгений Васильевич Чуйков; May 18, 1924 – February 15, 2000) was a Ukrainian landscape painter working in the Russian realist (The Wanderers) and French Impressionist traditions.

== Life and work ==
=== Early years and the Second World War ===
Evgeniy Chuikov was born in the village of Nizhniy Reut, Kursk region, Russia. His father Vasiliy Chuikov was an accountant and Evgeniy was the second eldest of three brothers. In 1933 the family moved to Zaporizhzhia, Ukraine and Chuikov began attending the local art school under the stewardship I.F.Fedyanin. He quickly distinguished himself with his strong visual memory and intuitive feeling for colour but the pursuit of further art education was however halted by the commencement of the Second World War.

In 1943, at the age of 19, he enrolled into the Red Army and joined the 3rd Ukrainian Front (Southwestern Front). He was assigned to a reconnaissance unit and took part in the Soviet advance across the Dnieper. As the Red Army progressed, Chuikov joined the 3rd Belorussian Front and fought in the Prague Offensive and the Battle of Berlin. He served in Berlin until 1946 after which time he returned to Zaporizhzhia. For his service during the War he was awarded the 2nd and 3rd Order of Glory and the Medal "For Courage" as well as numerous other accolades.

=== Post War and the Zaporizhzhia school of art ===
Evgeniy Chuikov, Autumn Peace

In 1948, working as an artist designer at Zaporizhstal, Chuikov became friends with several other young artists and had joined the local artist workshop. It was at this moment that the Zaporizhzhia school of art was born and encompassed other artists like G. Kolosovsky, Korobov, Fomin and Akinshin.

The subjects shared an interest in nature. Influenced by Russian realists and Impressionists, they sought to represent light, tone, and color, as well as the sound and air of specific moments.

Chuikov’s influence on the formation of the school and his fellow artists was profound. As a member of the USSR Union of Artists, Chuikov embarked on the formation of the Zaporizhzhia branch of the Artists’ Union of Ukraine (USSR Union of Artists) established in 1963, which he oversaw as Chairman for over 20 years whilst also serving on the governing board of the Artists’ Union of Ukraine.

Yet it is his artistic influence which is most celebrated. In the late 1960s after several painting trips to the historic Russian city of Vladimir, he was introduced to the Vladimir school of art and became friends with such artists as V.Ukin, K.Britov and V.Kokurin. Their decorative, colour-saturated canvases made a big impact on Chuikov’s work. His landscapes became more assertive with colour and brush strokes and developed a historic melancholy characteristic of such 19th-century Russian realists as Arkady Rylov and Isaac Levitan. His work of that period, including the series dedicated to Alexandre Pushkin “Mikhailovskoe”(Pushkin (town)) dramatically influenced the Zaporizhzhia school introducing his fellow artists to a more decorative, lighter palette.

In 1977 Chuikov was awarded the title of Merited Artist of Ukraine (Meritorious Artist) and in 1997 the highest award – the title of the People's Artist of Ukraine.

== Exhibitions ==
Throughout his artistic career he took part in over 70 national, republican and regional exhibitions. He also participated in over 20 international exhibitions primarily in the United Kingdom, Canada, USA and France.

== Collections ==
Chuikov’s paintings can be found in many museums across Russia and Former Soviet Union Republics including The National Art Museum of Ukraine, Moscow Art Academy, Zaporizhzhia Art Museum, Donetsk Art Museum, Sumy Art Museum.

== Bibliography ==
- N. Bazhan, History of Ukrainian Painting, 1968
- I. Churina, Landscapes of Evgeniy Chuikov, 1971
- S. Latanskiy, Evgeniy Chuikov, personal exhibition catalogue, 1985
- Artist Rating Encyclopaedia, Volume VII, Moscow, 2006
- Matthew Cullerne Bown, A Dictionary of Twentieth Century Russian and Soviet Painters 1900-80s, 1998, Izo
