= Seitnebi Abduramanov =

Soviet Crimean Tatar military commander (1914–1987)

- Сеитнеби Абдураманов
- Born: 15 February 1914; Büyük Qaralez, Taurida Governorate, Russian Empire
- Died: 15 December 1987 (aged 73); Namangan, Uzbek SSR, USSR
- Military career
- Allegiance: Soviet Union
- Branch: Red Army
- Service years: 1936–1945 (with a break)
- Rank: Senior Sergeant
- Unit: 1232nd Infantry Regiment
- Conflicts: World War II
- Awards: Order of Glory (1st, 2nd and 3rd class); Order of the Patriotic War, 1st class Order of the Red Star; Medal "For Courage"

Seitnebi Abduramanov (Crimean Tatar: Сеитнеби Абдураманов) 15 February 1914 – 15 December 1987) was a Soviet junior platoon commander in the Red Army during World War II who was awarded the Order of Glory 1st class. However, he was unaware of the award for years since he had been exiled to Uzbekistan due to his Crimean Tatar ethnicity after he was demobilized from the military shortly after the end of the war.

== Early life ==
Abduramanov was born on 15 February 1914 to a Crimean Tatar peasant family in Buyuk-Karalez, Crimea. After completing seven grades of school he was drafted into the army in 1936; he was briefly demobilized and worked as a tax inspector until he was recalled to fight in the Soviet-Finnish war. In Spring 1941 he was sent for training to become a platoon commander.

== World War II ==
Abduramanov was deployed to the Southwestern Front as part of an artillery unit in June 1941 immediately after the German invasion of the Soviet Union. In his first battle he managed to destroy three enemy tanks before joining an infantry unit after the gun broke. He was later deployed to the Battle of Stalingrad as part of the 95th Infantry Division. After being wounded twice he spent less than four days in the hospital before returning to his unit, but was wounded seriously on 14 October during combat at a tractor factory. After recovering he was sent to the rear of the fighting before returning to his unit, which had recently earned the Guards designation. He went on to fight in the Battle of the Kursk Bulge and in the Left-bank Ukraine, where he was again seriously wounded. While recovering in the hospital he received a letter from his village informing him that his parents had been murdered by the Nazis for helping partisans and their house burned down. After being discharged from the hospital he was sent to the 1232nd Infantry Regiment and was appointed as commander of the 5th Rifle Company.

He was awarded the Order of Glory 3rd class in December 1944 for his actions on 20 October during which he led a daytime raid that resulted in the capture of an enemy serviceman, which provided crucial intelligence for organizing later advances. After the successful raid he was transferred to a reconnaissance platoon, where he led another successful raid that resulted in the collection of valuable information about the locations enemy firing points, for which he was awarded the Medal for Courage. During the Vistula–Oder Offensive he led a scout battalion. On 29 January 1945 Abduramanov and eight scouts attacked an enemy trench, killing seven enemy combatants and taking three as hostages, which provided information that helped the infantry advance. In a later incident his platoon took out a platoon of submachine gunners in addition to taking eight prisoners. For his actions on that mission he was awarded a second Order of Glory on 21 February. Shortly after being awarded the Order of the Red Star on 25 February he was promoted to the position of assistant platoon commander. In April 1945 he advanced to Berlin as part of the 370th Infantry Division.

During the fighting in Berlin on 26 April he led his platoon in storming a hill, taking out 18 enemy soldiers in the process. Abduramanov himself later killed seven more enemy soldiers and took 14 as prisoner before the storming of Lippe on 28 April. For doing so, his regimental commander nominated him for the Order of Glory 1st class, which was approved by the Supreme Soviet in 1946.

== Exile ==
When his regiment was demobilized in November 1945 after end of the war, he was deported to the Uzbek SSR despite his accomplishments in the war; Crimean Tatars were considered enemies of the people solely on the grounds of their ethnicity and regardless of their individual merits in the war. Abduramanov was unaware he had been awarded the Order of Glory 1st class for years, and the medal was not presented to him until 1968. He worked at a factory in the city of Namangan but was never able to return to his native Crimea.
