= Leonid Velilayev =

Crimean Tatar soldier in the Red Army

- Born: Nasibulla Abibulla oğlu Velilâyev; 15 May 1916; Akmonai, Taurida Governorate, Russian Empire
- Died: 27 December 1997 (aged 81); Antratsyt, Ukraine
- Military career
- Allegiance: Soviet Union
- Branch: Red Army
- Service years: 1937–1948
- Rank: Starshina
- Conflicts: World War II
- Awards: Order of Glory (1st, 2nd and 3rd class); Order of the Patriotic War, 1st class Medal "For Courage"; Medal "For Battle Merit"

Leonid (Nasibulla) Abibulaevich Velilayev (Russian: Леонид (Насибулла) Абибулаевич Велиляев, Crimean Tatar: Nasibulla Abibulla oğlu Velilâyev/Насибулла Абибулла огълу Велиляев; 15 May 1916 – 27 December 1997) was a Crimean Tatar soldier in the Red Army who was awarded the Order of Glory 1st class for bravery in World War II.

== Early life ==
Velilayev was born in 1916 to a Crimean Tatar peasant family in the rural village of Akmonai. After completing seven grades of school in 1928 he had an apprenticeship at a factory and later worked at a metallurgical plant in Kerch until entering the Red Army in 1937; he was soon deployed to fight in the Soviet-Finnish war.

== World War II ==
Velilayev was assigned to the 140th Guards Infantry Regiment during World War II. He was awarded his first Order of Glory in 1944 for his actions as an assistant platoon commander in the village of Olshanka, Ukraine, in which he was wounded while he led an attack on enemy defensive positions that resulted in the deaths of 13 enemy soldiers and three firing positions. He was later awarded the Medal for Courage for leading a successful attack on the western bank of the Vistula river that eliminated 20 enemy soldiers.

On 8 February 1945 he was awarded the Order of Glory 2nd class for having personally captured a German general in the Warsaw offensive after storming an enemy trench. During heavy street fighting in the Battle of Berlin on 1 May 1945 Velilayev took command of his platoon and led an advance, in which they destroyed four machine gun points and killed 18 enemy soldiers. For doing so he was awarded the Order of Glory 1st class at the Kremlin on 15 May 1946. He was demobilized from the military in January 1948.

== Later life ==
Velilayev, having taken on the Slavic name of Leonid, was one of the very few Crimean Tatars who was not deported to Central Asia in the Sürgün. He lived out the remainder of his life in mainland Ukraine, first in Donetsk and later in Antratsyt, where he worked in a mine. He died on 27 December 1997.
