= Trunovsky (rural locality) =

Name of several Russian rural localities

Trunovsky (Russian: Труновский; masculine), Trunovskaya (Труновская; feminine), or Trunovskoye (Труновское; neuter) is the name of several rural localities in Russia:

- Trunovskoye, Novosibirsk Oblast, a railway station in Barabinsky District of Novosibirsk Oblast
- Trunovskoye, Stavropol Krai, a selo in Trunovsky Selsoviet of Trunovsky District of Stavropol Krai
