= List of recipients of four Orders of Glory =

The Order of Glory (Russian: Орден Славы) was a Soviet military decoration established on 8 November 1943 by Decree of the Presidium of the Supreme Soviet. It had three classes, awarded to soldiers and non-commissioned officers of the Red Army and to junior officers of the Red Air Force. Those who received all three classes of the Order received the title "Full Cavalier of the Order of Glory", which was equal in rank and status to a Hero of the Soviet Union.

Due to clerical errors, a total of 87 people were awarded the Order of Glory four times by the Presidium of the Supreme Soviet. Only one person, Dmitry Kokhanovsky, was awarded the Order of Glory it five times. This list is ordered alphabetically per the Cyrillic alphabet by surname. Those who were awarded the Order of Glory posthumously are highlighted in gray.

#	Name	Date of Decree and Order Number			4th Decree	Service branch	Source
#	Name	3rd Class	2nd Class	1st Class	4th Decree	Service branch	Source
1	Mikhail Petrovich Apalkov	5 September 1944 #144433	8 February 1945 #10440	29 June 1945 #300	3rd Class; 12 September 1944	Infantry	
2	Nasir Baitursunov	24 August 1944 #309727	14 April 1945 #22935	31 May 1945 #2994	3rd Class; 9 December 1944	Artillery	
3	Ivan Timofeevich Bakarov	14 January 1944 #247799	8 March 1945 #15002	31 May 1945 #516	2nd Class; 19 September 1944	Artillery	
4	Dmitry Fedorovich Baryshnikov	6 April 1944 #10182	29 October 1944 #35709	31 March 1956 #2380	2nd Class; 10 March 1945	Artillery	
5	Andrey Nikiforovich Bedan	12 April 1944 #52396	25 August 1944 #30590	2 January 1945 #959	3rd Class; 13 May 1944	Infantry	
6	Kerim Dagulovich Bejanov	19 August 1944 #192900	30 April 1945 #19744	27 February 19458 #3753	2nd Class; 28 May 1945	Artillery	
7	Ivan Nikitovich Bishovets	17 May 1944 #99340	2 September 1944 #7767	29 June 1945 #1643	3rd Class; 20 July 1944	Artillery	
8	Blagov, Pavel Stepanovich	6 November 1944 #185601	22 February 1945 #4437	15 May 1946 #1085	2nd Class; 19 March 1945	Air Force	
9	Dmitry Vasilyevich Bondarenko	25 February 1944 #68342	29 September 1944 #4437	23 April 1945 #1085	3rd Class; 22 April 1944	Infantry	
10	Stepan Petrovich Burmatov	30 May 1944 #45656	10 October 1944 #7788	24 March 1945 #344	1st Class; 29 June 1945	Infantry	
11	Mikhail Petrovich Varfolomeev	22 May 1944 #65340	26 June 1944 #10056	27 June 1945 #194	3rd Class; 19 December 1943	Artillery	
12	Alexander Ivanovich Velichko	15 May 1944 #215173	2 April 1945 #31177	27 June 1945 #1338	2nd Class; 17 May 1945	Artillery	
13	Stepan Kalinovich Vershinin	19 August 1944 #145297	24 March 1945 #26143	15 May 1946 #521	3rd Class; 31 May 1945	Artillery	
14	Pavel Maksimovich Veselkov	31 August 1944 #184379	10 October 1944 #1532	23 June 1989 #1984	2nd Class; 26 November 1944	Airborne troops	
15	Efim Fedoseevich Vlasenko	6 September 1944 #136269	3 March 1945	23 April 1975 #1950	3rd Class; 20 October 1944	Infantry	
16	Vasily Grigorievich Volkov	16 March 1944 #40295	11 November 1944	29 June 1945	3rd Class; 1 September 1944	Infantry	
17	Ivan Fedorovich Vtornikov	22 August 1944 #89945	17 February 1945 #11227	15 May 1945 #76	3rd Class; 4 August 1944	Artillery	
18	Alimurat Gaibov	6 November 1944 #19268	10 January 1945 #9836	29 June 1945 #821	2nd Class; 31 January 1945 #36043	Infantry	
19	Mikhail Andreevich Glushchenko	2 October 1944 #205212	9 February 1945 #7001	31 May 1945 #905	3rd Class; 13 August 1944	Artillery	
20	Aleksey Andreevich Goryachev	28 August 1944 #219043	3 March 1945 #12581	14 April 1945 #1056	2nd Class; 6 November 1944	Infantry	
21	Timofey Emelyanovich Gruby	30 November 1944 #225743	4 April 1945 #19266	15 May 1946 #922	3rd Class; 23 January 1945 #316072	Infantry	
22	Alexander Ilyich Dalidovich	6 July 1944 #73121	17 April 1945 #13858	31 May 1945 #905	3rd Class; 8 March 1945 #637485	Infantry	
23	Amresh Darmenov	22 April 1944 #509751	10 August 1944 #13493	29 June 1945 #1285	3rd Class; 9 April 1944	Infantry	
24	Sergey Sergeevich Degtev	25 November 1943 #3566	14 June 1944 #1963	27 June 1945 #1274	3rd Class; 14 February 1944	Artillery	
25	Alexander Andreevich Drozdov	17 February 1944	26 August 1944	24 May 1945	3rd Class; 20 February 1944	Engineer troops	
26	Nikolai Mikhailovich Dudin	4 April 1945 #348135	26 May 1945 #16988	15 May 1945 #1679	3rd Class; 20 October 1944	Infantry	
27	Viktor Ivanovich Evseev	18 April 1944 #8079	13 February 1944 #19118	29 June 1945 #2398	3rd Class; 4 August	Artillery	
28	Viktor Makarovich Edakin	22 January 1944 #718409	25 January 1944 #16988	24 March 1945 #2608	3rd Class; 5 February 1944	Infantry	
29	Vasily Dmitrievich Zinkevich	20 June 1944 #163335	31 October 1944 #5989	29 June 1945 #1339	3rd Class; 12 August 1944	Infantry	
30	Victor Nikiforovich Zotov	9 May 1944 #149977	24 March 1945 #47367	27 June 1945 #1901	3rd Class; 24 September 1944	Artillery	
31	Vladimir Alexandrovich Ivanov	10 April 1944 #154843	18 August 1944 #6265	24 March 1945	1st Class; 10 April 1945	Artillery	
32	Ivan Vasilyevich Ivanov	10 April 1944 #284977	29 April 1945 #34233	15 May 1946 #865	2nd Class; 16 April 1945	Infantry	
33	Mikhail Trofimovich Ivanov	16 February 1944 #16806	19 September 1944 #5989	24 March 1945 #1411	3rd Class; 10 September 1944	Infantry	
34	Kairgazy Imashev	18 September 1944 #197716	29 August 1944 #10439	29 June 1945 #299	3rd Class; 25 August 1944	Infantry	
35	Temirgali Isabaev	30 April 1944 #47972	3 June 1944 #3894	29 June 1945 #1358	3rd Class; 18 January 1944	Infantry	
36	Petr Ivanovich Kirillov	18 March 1944 #15704	20 June 1944 #961	15 May 1946 #161	3rd Class; 16 March 1944	Engineer troops	
37	Mikhail Vasilyevich Kirshin	11 March 1944 #22462	18 July 1944 #3816	24 March 1945	3rd Class; 23 March 1944	Infantry	
38	Vasily Egorovich Konev	5 September 1944 #140369	8 December 1944 #6013	15 May 1946 #1930	2nd Class; 31 December 1944	Artillery	
39	Nikolai Ivanovich Konovalov	3 March 1944	13 February 1945	15 May 1946 #1486	2nd Class; 8 June 1945	Engineer troops	
40	Zinovy Petrovich Konshin	25 August 1944 #240143	10 June 1944 #28169	19 August 1945 #3707	3rd Class; 24 September 1944	Infantry	
41	Ivan Pavlovich Kopylov	23 January 1944 #68292	26 September 1944 #6293	27 June 1945 #1590	3rd Class; 20 May 1944	Artillery	
42	Vladimir Yakovlevich Kornienko	1 March 1944 #68999	30 November 1944 #39825	10 November 1970 #2921	3rd Class; 27 July 1944	Infantry	
43	Ivan Semyonovich Krasikov	9 September 1944 #156518	20 December 1944 #9841	23 May 1945 #419	3rd Class; 1 March 1944	Infantry	
44	Nikolai Kirikovich Lazurko	28 December 1943 #15609	1 September 1944 #46429	23 March 1963 #2606	2nd Class; 21 December 1944	Artillery	
45	Nikolai Evgenievich Litvinenko	9 February 1944 #15200	29 March 1945 #31235	7 June 1944 #2992	2nd Class; 16 December 1944	Signal corps	
46	Tikhon Yakovlevich Litovchik	27 September 1944 #34938	2 April 1945 #46429	27 June 1945 #1077	2nd Class; 28 May 1945	Infantry	
47	Nikolai Stepanovich Likhobabin	12 May 1944 #120068	8 July 1944 #200	29 June 1945	3rd Class; 9 March 1944	Infantry	
48	Andrey Avtonomovich Loboda	8 October 1944 #141191	13 February 1945 #8915	15 May 1945 #1346	3rd Class; 17 February 1945	Infantry	
49	Peter Antonovich Makarov	29 June 1944	24 October 1944 #8729	24 March 1945	3rd Class; 2 July 1944	Engineer troops	
50	Shakir Fatikhovich Mannanov	6 December 1943 #57717	5 September 1944 #4212	22 February 1945 #9	3rd Class; 13 April 1944 #603021	Artillery	
51	Illarion Grigorievich Merkulov	6 December 1944 #179368	5 February 1945	29 June 1945	3rd Class; 6 January 1945	Infantry	
52	Grigory Efremovich Murai	1 February 1944 #24220	9 February 1945 #14370	29 June 1945 #1784	2nd Class; 28 February 1945 #14835	Infantry	
53	Vasily Savelevich Naldin	19 January 1944 #4755	28 February 1944 #35410	24 March 1945 #995	2nd Class; 19 September 1944 #35410	Artillery	
54	Ivan Ilyich Okolovich	20 July 1944 #185010	31 January 1945 #9309	29 June 1945 #447	3rd Class; 15 December 1944 #194894	Infantry	
55	Nikolai Aleksandrovich Petrikov	21 February 1944 #50566	30 April 1945 #26096	27 March 1945 #2634	3rd Class; 3 December 1943	Infantry	
56	Aleksey Stepanovich Petrukovich	21 August 1944 #88616	27 February 1945 #18203	15 May 1945 #73	2nd Class; 26 March 1945	Infantry	
57	Alexander Pavlovich Pokidov	24 24 August 1944 #120789	23 March 1945 #9643	15 May 1946 #845	3rd Class; 11 November 1944	Artillery	
58	Nikolai Aleksandrovich Polkovnikov	30 December 1944 #232282	7 February 1945 #14230	29 June 1945 #281	3rd Class; 12 January 1945	Infantry	
59	Vasily Onufrievich Polyashko	6 September 1944 #215217	27 April 1945 #17874	27 June 1945 #242	2nd Class; 28 May 1945	Infantry	
60	Nikolai Nikolaevich Popov	16 February 1944 #1333	31 July 1944 #3410	24 March 1945 #154	1st Class; 10 April 1945; Not awarded (Note: By Decree of the Supreme Council of the Armed Forces, the award was cancelled on 10 November 1970 and instead the Order of the Patriotic War, 2nd Class, was awarded.)	Engineer troops	
61	Ivan Mikhailovich Rastyapin	5 December 1943 #54224	12 March 1945 #15165	15 May 1946 #1235	3rd Class; 16 November 1943	Cavalry	
62	Aleksey Petrovich Rogov	29 June 1944 #47106	2 October 1944 #7803	24 March 1945 #352	3rd Class; 22 March 1944 #120432	Artillery	
63	Alexander Ivanovich Roslyakov	20 March 1944	19 June 1944	24 March 1945 #1475	1st Class; 29 June 1945	Infantry	
64	Ivan Pavlovich Savchenko	9 November 1944 #176540	3 May 1945 #36077	26 December 1967 #2986	2nd Class; 31 May 1945	Medical	
65	Semyon Artyomovich Semyonov	30 July 1944 #90226	21 September 1944 #4282	24 March 1945 #2915	3rd Class; 13 May 1944	Artillery	
66	Pavel Kondratievich Simonenko	22 May 1944 #36460	11 November 1945 #30007	7 June 1968 #2946	3rd Class; 21 January 1945	Engineer troops	
67	Mikhail Nikiforovich Skrementov	2 August 1944 #29460	18 March 1945 #29460	15 May 1946 #29460	3rd Class; 10 August 1944	Artillery	
68	Nikolai Alekseevich Smirnov	2 August 1944 #47110	18 March 1945 #2292	15 May 1946	2nd Class; 27 July 1944	Artillery	
69	Aleksey Emelyanovich Solodovnikov	24 January 1944 #14598	18 November 1944 #34769	1 October 1961 #3162	3rd Class; 16 April 1944	Infantry	
70	Filipp Romanovich Spiridonov	10 June 1944 #192706	8 September 1944 #9208	10 April 1945	2nd Class; 5 October 1944	Artillery	
71	Nikolai Fedorovich Suvorov	30 July 1944 #126785	7 March 1945 #25302	15 May 1946 #1158	2nd Class; 15 April 1945	Infantry	
72	Nikolai Semyonovich Sushkov	12 October 1944 #156144	31 January 1945 #9859	15 May 1946 #1087	2nd Class; 28 February 1945	Infantry	
73	Sergey Stepanovich Taraev	30 April 1944 #45649	16 July 1944 #26189	27 July 1972 #3198	3rd Class; 28 June 1944 #773635	Artillery	
74	Alexander Kuzmich Terekhov	23 January 1944 #144087	8 March 1945 #29429	15 May 1946 #1682	3rd Class; 9 September 1944	Infantry	
75	Sergey Ivanovich Trunilin	31 December 1943 #33956	27 May 1944 #1336	24 March 1945 #515	3rd Class; 12 March 1944	Infantry	
76	Sergey Kirillovich Trukhin	31 December 1943 #753	14 April 1944 #70	24 March 1945 #3772	2nd Class; 11 April 1944 #37541	Infantry	
77	Fedor Matveevich Udodov	17 April 1944 #50860	24 November 1944 #6864	26 June 1945 #453	3rd Class; 20 May 1944	Engineer troops	
78	Timofey Yakovlevich Usachev	18 August 1944 #712662	2 February 1958 #45504	2 February 1958 #3744	2nd Class; 18 February 1945	Infantry	
79	Mikhail Mikhailovich Kharchenko	23 July 1944 #84418	25 August 1944 #6198	24 March 1945 #206	1st Class; 10 April 1945 #2182	Infantry	
80	Vasily Timofeevich Khristenko	4 November 1944 #165203	22 January 1945 #8964	15 May 1946 #1794	3rd Class; 22 February 1944	Infantry	
81	Aleksey Alekseevich Tsukanov	23 May 1944 #74598	22 February 1945 #11989	19 April 1945 #155	3rd Class; 10 May 1944	Infantry	
82	Dmitry Timofeevich Cherneev	3 August 1944 #75200	5 February 1945 #8986	15 May 1946 #1800	2nd Class; 22 February 1945 #46167	Infantry	
83	Leonid Nikolaevich Chirkov	5 August 1944 #214109	12 March 1945 #24872	27 June 1945 #1874	2nd Class; 13 March 1945	Infantry	
84	Vasily Ilyich Shakali	1 June 1944 #54473	11 April 1945 #15952	31 March 1956 #2390	1st Class; 15 May 1946 #2156	Infantry	
85	Nikolai Mikhailovich Shunin	16 August 1944 #519664	24 May 1945 #31858	31 March 1956 #2367	2nd Class; 14 April 1945	Infantry	
86	Nikolai Platonovich Shuranov	17 August 1944 #456637	26 October 1944 #23700	15 May 1946 #2955	2nd Class; 9 March 1945	Artillery	
87	Grigory Vasilyevich Yakovlev	1 August 1944 #142436	27 March 1945 #13563	29 June 1945 #139	3rd Class; 11 January 1944	Artillery	
