= Noah Dumbadze =

Soviet Guards soldier (1912–1983)

- ნოე დუმბაძე
- Born: 21 April 1912; Shemokmedi, Georgia, Russian Empire
- Died: 09 April 1983 (aged 71); Shemokmedi, Georgian SSR
- Military career
- Allegiance: Soviet Union
- Branch: Red Army
- Service years: 1941–1945
- Unit: 166th Guards Rifle Regiment
- Conflicts: World War II
- Awards: Order of Glory (1st, 2nd and 3rd class)

Noah Dumbadze (Georgian: ნოე დუმბაძე, Noe Dumbadze Russian: Ной Иосифович Думбадзе, Noy Iosifovich Dumbadze; 21 April 1912 – 9 April 1983) was a Soviet Guards soldier who fought in World War II and Full Cavallier of the Order of Glory.

== Early life ==
Noah Dumbadze was born on 8 (21) April 1912, in Shemokmedi, Georgia, then part of the Russian Empire, into a working-class family. He graduated from trade school and entered military service in 1941.

== World War II ==
From July 1941 till the end of the war, Dumbadze served as infantryman of the elite Soviet 166th Guards Rifle Regiment and distinguished himself particularly in the 1944 Crimean offensive and subsequently in Operation Bagration. On 11 January 1944, during a German counterattack on the Kerch peninsula, he killed three enemy soldiers and delivered messages to headquarters twice under heavy fire. Several days later on 18 January he was awarded the Order of Glory 3rd degree. On 24 June 1944 during a breakthrough at the Belorussian front, Dumbadze was among the first to breach the opponents trenches by the village Pruzhinishche in Belarus. He took out a pillbox using hand grenades and eliminated seven enemy soldiers, for which he was awarded the Order of Glory 2nd degree. Shortly after on 12 July 1944 he was part of his regiment's force that circumvented German fortifications at the city Pinsk in order to breach their defenses. When fighting ensued at close-quarters, Dumbadze managed to kill 12 enemy soldiers with his gun, hand grenades and in melee combat. The attack resulted in the remaining enemy retreating from their trench. During the clearing of Brest from 26 to 28 July 1944, Dumbadze eliminated another 10 enemy soldiers and used hand grenades to take out a machine gun nest, that was suppressing the Soviet assault. He also found and killed two enemy snipers. On March 24, 1945, in recognition of his actions, courage and bravery, he was awarded the Order of Glory 1st degree, which is equivalent to Hero of the Soviet Union.

== Post war life ==
When the war ended, Dumbadze left the army and returned to Shemokmedi, where he worked as salesman. Noah Dumbadze died on 9 April 1983 at the age of 71.
