= Order of Glory =

Military decoration of the Soviet Union

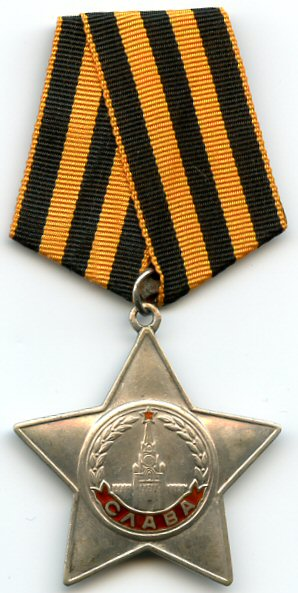
- Order of Glory 3rd class
- Type: A military order comprising three classes
- Awarded for: Bravery in the face of the enemy
- Presented by: Soviet Union
- Eligibility: Red Army privates, corporals, sergeants and aviation junior lieutenants
- Status: No longer awarded
- Established: 8 November 1943
- First award: 28 November 1943

Highlights
- Total: First Class – 2,656; Second Class – 46,473; Third Class – 997,815
- Ribbon of the Order of Glory, "Georgian Ribbon".
- Related: Order of Labor Glory (Civilian)

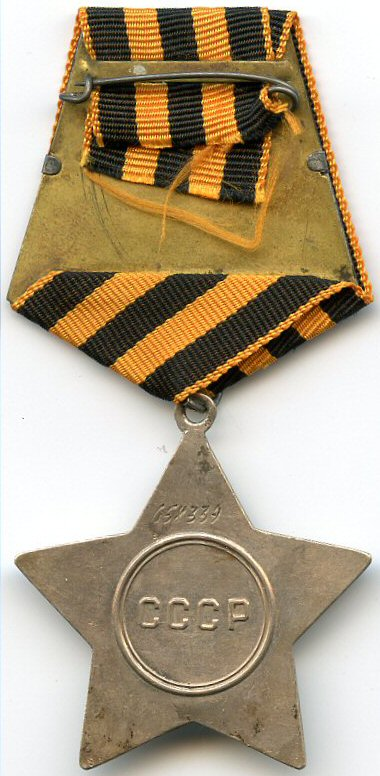
Reverse of the Order of Glory 3rd class

The Order of Glory (Russian: Орден Славы, romanised: Orden Slavy) was a military decoration of the Soviet Union established by Decree of the Presidium of the Supreme Soviet on 8 November 1943. It was awarded to soldiers and non-commissioned officers of the Red Army as well as to aviation junior lieutenants, for bravery in the face of the enemy.

While the overwhelming majority of all Order of Glory awards was for combat valour in the Second World War (or the Great Patriotic War as it is known in Russia and some other post-Soviet states), there are documented instances of awards of the order's lowest class - its third class - for post-war Soviet military operations. Numbering among these were Order of Glory Third Class awards authorised for Soviet operations in support of the Korean War from 1950 to 1953 as well as for the Soviet invasion of Hungary in autumn of 1956. A small number of Order of Glory Third Class awards was also made in connection with armed border clashes with the People's Republic of China in 1969.

The order became defunct with the dissolution of the Soviet Union. In 1992, the Cross of St. George was revived to serve the same purpose of recognising enlisted personnel bravery.

== Award statute ==
The original statute from the 1943 decree establishing the Order stated that: "the Order of Glory is awarded to privates and sergeants of the Red Army, and to aviation junior lieutenants, who displayed glorious feats of bravery, courage and fearlessness in combat for the Soviet Motherland."

The Decree of the Presidium of the Supreme Soviet of the USSR of 7 October 1951 amended the ranks to read: "privates, corporals and sergeants as well as aviation junior lieutenants."

The Order of Glory, which was modelled closely after the Tsarist Cross of St. George, was divided into three distinct classes. Like the Cross of St. George, a soldier would initially be recommended for the order's lowest class - in the case of the Order of Glory its third class. Subsequent distinct acts of valour could result in the soldier being recommended for the order's two remaining classes - its second and first class - which were awarded sequentially. Soldiers who received each of the order's three classes were referred to as a "Full Cavalier of the Order of Glory" (Russian: "полный кавалер ордена Славы"). In Soviet society they were accorded the same rights and privileges as those granted to personnel who had received the Hero of the Soviet Union title. All told, 2,656 Red Army soldiers (including four men who were also awarded the Hero of the Soviet Union title as well as four women) would attain Full Cavalier status.

The Order of Glory was worn on the left side of the chest. In the presence of other USSR orders and medals it was worn immediately after the Order of the Badge of Honour. If worn in the presence of awards of the Russian Federation, the latter have precedence.

== Award criteria ==
Below are the specific award criteria for both ground troops and aviators.

=== For ground troops ===
- For leading the initial strike into an enemy position, and personal courage that contributed to the success of the common cause;
- For pressing on an attack in a burning tank;
- For saving the banner from capture by the enemy in a moment of grave danger;
- For displayed marksmanship in the killing of from 10 to 50 enemy soldiers and officers using personal weapons;
- For the destruction of at least 2 enemy tanks while manning an anti tank gun;
- For the destruction of between 1 and 3 enemy tanks with hand grenades on the field of battle or behind enemy lines;
- For the destruction of at least 3 enemy aircraft with artillery or machine gun fire;
- For despising danger by being the first to burst into an enemy bunker (bunker, trench or dugout), for decisive actions that destroyed its occupants;
- For leading our troops in the enemy's rear through weaknesses in his defences found as a result of personal reconnaissance;
- For personally capturing an enemy officer;
- For night watch action resulting in an enemy death or capture;
- For displayed ingenuity and boldness in making one's way to the enemy position and destroying his machine gun or mortar;
- For participation in a night raid, destroying enemy military stores and property;
- For risking one's life while saving one's commander from imminent danger in battle;
- For showing neglect for personal danger in the capture of an enemy banner in battle;
- For being seriously wounded but returning to the battle after minimal medical care;
- For downing an enemy aircraft with personal weapons;
- For destroying enemy weapons and positions with accurate artillery or mortar fire ensuring the success of the mission;
- For making a passage through the enemy's barbed-wire entanglements while under fire;
- For selflessness in the rescue of the wounded during battle;
- For carrying on in a mission in a tank with a defective main gun;
- For quickly smashing a tank into an enemy convoy and carrying on with the mission after its destruction;
- For crushing with one's tank one or more enemy guns or destroying at least two machine gun nests;
- For gathering valuable intelligence from the enemy while on reconnaissance;

=== For aviators ===
- Fighter pilot – For downing between 2 and 4 enemy fighters or 3 to 6 enemy bombers.
- Fighter pilot – For a successful air attack that resulted in between 2 and 5 destroyed enemy tanks, or from 3 to 6 locomotives, or the destruction of an entire train, or the destruction of at least 2 enemy aircraft on their airfield.
- Fighter pilot – For bold actions in an air battle resulting in the destruction of one or two enemy aircraft.
- Day bomber crews – For the destruction of a railway station or marshalling yard, a bridge, ammunition dump, fuel stores, enemy headquarters or troop compound, power station, sunk enemy vessel, naval transport, launch, at least 2 enemy aircraft on their airfield.
- Day bomber crews – Bold action in aerial combat resulting 1 or 2 enemy planes shot down.
- Night light bomber crews – For the destruction of an ammunition dump, fuel stores, enemy headquarters, an entire train, a bridge.
- Long-range night bomber crews – For the destruction of a railway station or marshalling yard, ammunition dump, fuel stores, port facilities, naval transports, an entire train, an important plant or factory.
- Reconnaissance – For a highly successful reconnaissance mission which resulted in valuable intelligence about the enemy.

== Award description ==
The badge of the "Order of Glory" was a five-pointed star with a central medallion. The order's first class was made of 950 (23 karat) gold; the order's second class was made of silver with a gilt central medallion and the order's third class was made entirely of silver. The central medallion featured the Spasskaya Tower of the Kremlin, with a red enamelled five-pointed star at its top and a red enamelled scroll at the bottom bearing the word "GLORY" (Russian: СЛАВА). Laurel branches on each side along the medal circumference stopped just short of the red star. The reverse had the Cyrillic inscription for "USSR" (Russian: СССР) within a ring with a raised rim. The award serial number was either stamped (first class awards) or engraved above the ring on the reverse of the star's upper arm. The Order is suspended by a ring through the award's suspension loop to a standard Russian pentagonal mount covered by a 24mm-wide silk moiré ribbon of St George.

First Class	Second Class	Third Class
Ribbon

== Recipients (partial list) ==
The individuals below were recipients of the Order of Glory.

=== Full Cavaliers (all 3 classes) ===
- Seitnebi Abduramanov
- Ivan Drachenko
- Pavel Dubinda
- Duda Enginoev
- Matrena Necheporchukova
- Nina Pavlovna Petrova
- Danutė Stanelienė
- Nasibulla Velilayev
- Nadezhda Zhurkina
- Noah Dumbadze

=== Recipients of the 2nd and 3rd classes ===
- Kanti Abdurakhmanov
- Evgeniy Chuikov
- Agadadash Samedov
- Roza Shanina
- Heinrich Schultz

=== Recipients of the 3rd class ===
- Talgat Bigeldinov
- Genri Koptev-Gomolov
- Oles Honchar
- Mirza Jabiyev
- Yusif Mammadaliyev
- Mikhail Mikhalkov
- Sergei Osipov
- Mikhail Tanich
- Vladimir Teplyakov
- US Army Sgt. Max Thompson
- Ivan Varichev
- Vadim Igorovich Skarzhinsky

== See also ==
- List of recipients of four Orders of Glory
- Order of St George
- Cross of St George
- Georgian Ribbon
- Russian Guards
- Orders, decorations, and medals of the Soviet Union
