= Cross of St. George (Russia) =

Russian military order

Cross of Saint George
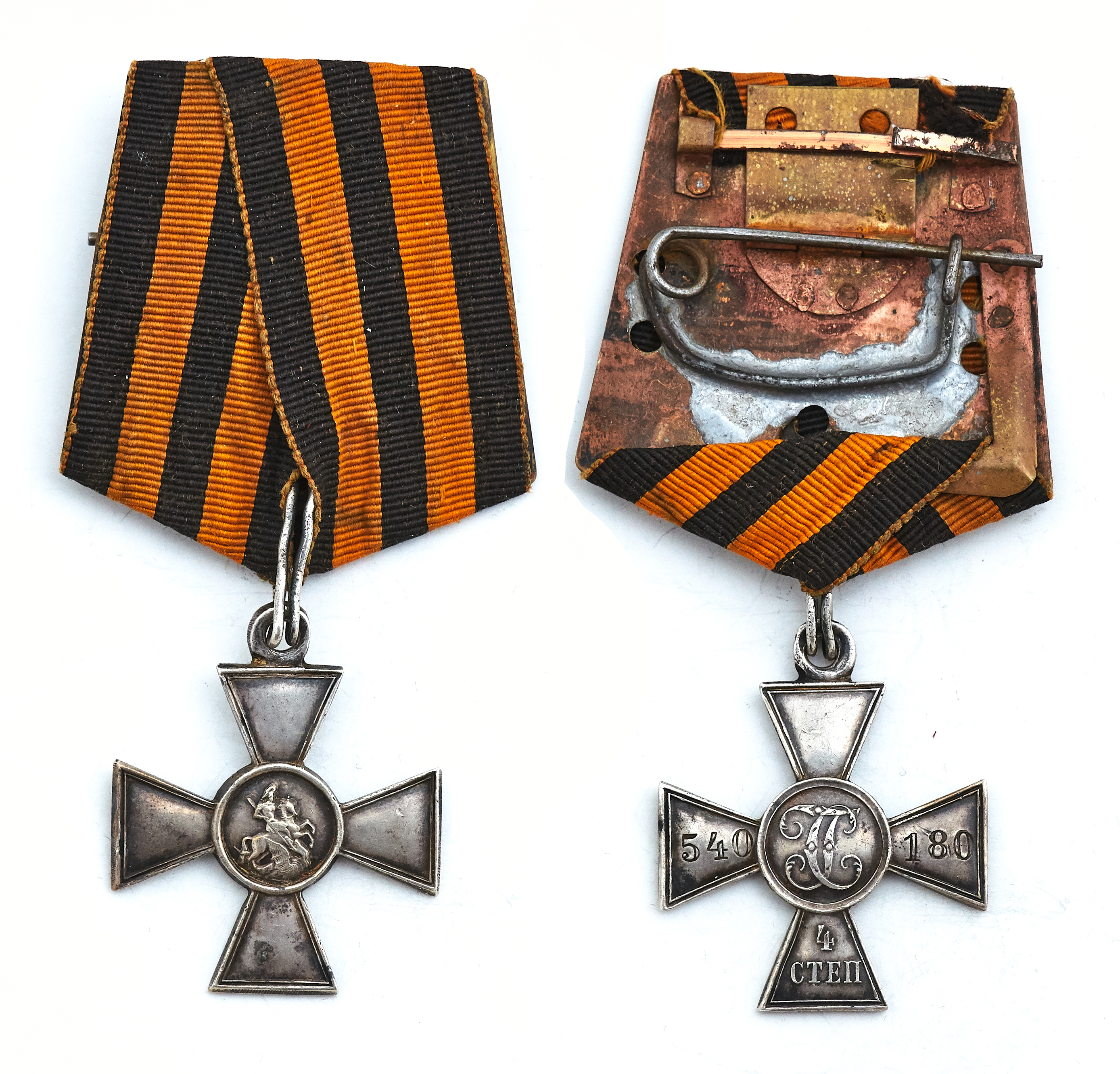
- Imperial Cross of Saint George IV class
- Type: Military Decoration
- Awarded for: Distinction in Combat
- Presented by: Russian Federation
- Eligibility: Soldiers, sailors, sergeants, petty officers, warrant officers and junior officers.
- Status: Active
- Established: 1807; Re-established 1992
- Ribbon of the Imperial Cross of Saint George 1st Class

Precedence
- Next (higher): Order of Parental Glory
- Next (lower): Decoration "For Beneficence"

The Cross of Saint George (Russian: Георгиевский крест, romanized: Georgiyevskiy krest) is a state decoration of the Russian Federation. It was initially established by Imperial Russia where it was officially known as the Decoration of the Military Order of Saint George between 1807 and 1913. The Cross of Saint George was reinstated into the Russian awards system in 1992.

== History 1807–1917 ==
Established in the February 1807 decree of Emperor Alexander I, it was intended as a reward for "undaunted courage" by the lower ranks (soldiers, sailors and NCOs) of the military. Article four of the decree ordered the decoration to hang from the same ribbon as the Order of Saint George. There was only a single class with no restriction as to the number of awards per person.

The first soldier to be awarded the Cross of Saint George was a cavalry non-commissioned officer named Yegor Ivanovich Mitrokhin. He received the award for distinction in the battle against the French at Friedland on 2 June 1807.

Numbering of the crosses on the reverse began in January 1809, conversely, a register of the awards was also started that same year. By this time, approximately 10,000 crosses had already been awarded. By the beginning of the War of 1812 (French invasion of Russia), 16,833 crosses had been produced by the mint. Statistics of awards over the first years is detailed below:

- 1812: 6,783 awarded
- 1813: 8,611 awarded
- 1814: 9,345 awarded
- 1815: 3,983 awarded
- 1816: 2,682 awarded
- 1817: 659 awarded
- 1818: 328 awarded
- 1819: 189 awarded

An 1856 royal decree divided the decoration into four classes. A person initially received the fourth class and would subsequently be promoted to higher classes for further acts of bravery; one who received all four classes was called a "Full Cavalier of Saint George". The first and second classes were made of gold, the third and fourth were made of silver. The numbering on the reverse began anew for each class of the decoration.

A 1913 royal decree officialized the name "Cross of Saint George" and the numbering began anew. In 1915, due to war shortages, the first and second class decorations were made of lower grade gold (60 percent gold, 39.5 percent silver, 0.5 percent copper). The third and fourth class decorations were produced in the same 99 percent silver. There were 26,950 first class crosses (No. 5531 to No. 32,840) and 52,900 second class crosses (No. 65,030 to No. 12,131) produced in low-grade gold. Approximate number of St. George Crosses awarded from 1914 to 1917:

- 1st class: 33,000
- 2nd class: 65,000
- 3rd class: 289,000
- 4th class: 1.2 million

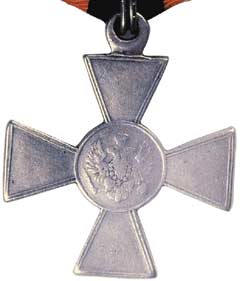
The Cross of St. George's for representatives of non-Christian faith with a double-headed eagle instead of St. George

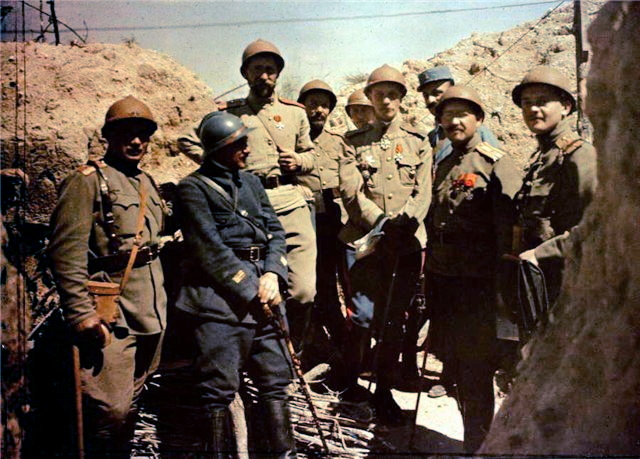
Soldiers of the Russian Expeditionary Force in France, mid-1916, two wearing the Cross of St. George

"1M" was used in the serial number to indicate the number one million. On 10 September 1916, the Highest Council of Ministers approved a change to the St George Cross removing the gold and silver from its making. They began to mint crosses made of "yellow metal" (JM) and of "white metal" (BM). The crosses first and second class, made of yellow metal had the letters "JM" (Russian "ЖМ") above the serial number, the crosses second and third class, made of white metal had the letters "BM" (Russian "БМ") above the serial number. The number of crosses produced for each class in "JM" and "BM":

- 1st class JM 10,000: No. 32,481 to No. 42,480
- 2nd class JM 20,000: No. 65,031 to No. 85,030
- 3rd class MB 49,500: No. 289,151 to No. 338,650
- 4th class MB 89,000: No. 1,210,151 to No. 1,299,150

In 1917, the Provisional Government changed the statute of the cross allowing its award to junior officers. When awarded as such, a silver laurel branch device was affixed to the ribbon. The Cross of St. George was abolished after the Bolshevik Revolution of 1917, the Order of Glory nominally replaced it during the Soviet Era.

== During the Civil War ==
The virtual absence of a unified command and the territorial fragmentation of the White armies meant that no common award system was created. Nor was there a unified approach to the question of the admissibility of awarding pre-revolutionary honours.

As for the soldiers' St George's Crosses and medals, they were awarded to ordinary soldiers and Cossacks, freedmen, non-commissioned officers, junkers, volunteers and nurses in all territories occupied by the White armies. During the Iași–Don March of Mikhail Drozdovsky's detachment along the Iasi Don route, a whole bag of St George's Crosses was given to Drozdovsky at the headquarters of the Romanian Front, were also awarded to the officers of the detachment. The first such award took place on 30 March 1918.

At the same time, in the south of Russia, on the territory of the Don Republic, taking into account the local specifics of George the Victorious on St George's Crosses depicted in the form of a Cossack: in a hat with a Bashlyk, Cossack uniform and boots, a forelock is visible from under the hat, his face is framed by a beard. Since 11 May 1918 more than 20 thousand such crosses of the 4th class, 9080 of the 3rd, 470 of the 2nd and one of the 1st were awarded. In the Don Army St George's Crosses were also awarded to officers and generals.

On 9 February 1919 the awarding of the George Cross was restored on the Eastern Front of the Russian Civil War to forces commanded by Alexander Kolchak. But at the same time it was forbidden to award officers with the George Cross with a laurel branch and to wear them.

In the Northern Army (Russia) of Evgenii Miller's Northern Army was awarded 2270 crosses of the 4th class, 422 of the 3rd class, 106 of the 2nd class and 17 of the 1st class.

In the Volunteer Army the awarding of St. George's Crosses was permitted on 12 August 1918 and took place on the same basis as in the Russian Imperial Army: "Soldiers and volunteers are presented [to] St. George's Crosses and medals for the feats specified [in] the St. George Statute, in the same order as during the war [on the] external front, awarded crosses by the authority of the commander, and medals by the authority of the commander". The first awarding took place on 4 October 1918. In the Army of Wrangel this practice was preserved.

The last Chevalier of St George of the Civil War, awarded in Russia, was Vakhmistr Pavel Vasilyevich Zhadan (1901-1975), awarded in June 1920 for his participation in the defeat of the cavalry corps of Dmitry Zhloba.

During the Russian Civil War, the award was issued by commanders of White movement forces, with Naval ratings, soldiers and their officers of Entente interventionist forces being decorated with the award.

== 1992 reinstatement ==
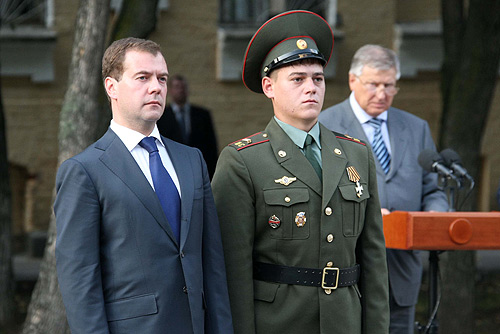
August 2008, Russian president Dmitry Medvedev with a junior sergeant just decorated with the Cross of Saint George 4th class for distinction in battle in the 2008 South Ossetia war

Following the fall of the Soviet Union in 1991, the Cross of St George was reinstated by Decision of the Supreme Soviet of the Russian Federation № 2557-I of March 20, 1992. Its award criteria were amended twice, first on August 8, 2000 by Presidential Decree 1463 and most recently by Presidential Decree 1099 of 7 September 2010.

The Cross of Saint George is awarded to soldiers, sailors, sergeants, petty officers, warrant officers and junior officers for deeds and distinction in battle in defence of the Fatherland, as well as for deeds and distinction in battle on the territory of other states while maintaining or restoring international peace and security with recognized instances of courage, dedication and military skill. Awarded sequentially in four classes from the fourth to the first for subsequent acts of courage.

The first post reinstatement award ceremony took place in August 2008 to soldiers who displayed courage and heroism during the armed conflict in South Ossetia. On that day, Russian president Dmitry Medvedev decorated 11 soldiers and sergeants with the Cross of Saint George, fourth class, for courage and heroism displayed in the performance of military duties. A further 263 servicemen were decorated with the Cross of Saint George for distinction displayed in the Georgia operation.

List of the 11 initial recipients in August 2008:

- Adushkin, Sergei Ravilyevich, junior sergeant
- Alekseev, Sergey Alexandrovich, junior sergeant
- Bazhenov, Taras Germanovich, private
- Kelohsaev, Atsamaz Tamerlanovich, junior sergeant
- Krupchatnikov, Alexander Dmitrievich, private
- Mustafin, Farid Ravkatovich, private
- Nurgaliyev, Nail Ravilyevich, private
- Polushkin, Sergei Nikolaevich, junior sergeant
- Revin, Nikolai Dmitrievich, private
- Suvorov, Dmitry Alexandrovich, private
- Yunusov, Rustam Abdukadirovich, junior sergeant

=== Russo-Ukrainian War ===
On New Year 2023, Russian president Vladimir Putin awarded the Cross of St. George to military personnel participating in the invasion of Ukraine.

== Award description ==
The modern Cross of Saint George is virtually identical to the imperial variant. It is a 34mm wide cross pattée worn on the left side of the chest with other medals, the obverse has a central medallion bearing the right facing image of Saint George on horseback slaying the dragon. The reverse of the central medallion bears the Cyrillic monogram of the Order of Saint George "SG" (Russian: «СГ»). The reverse of the two lateral arms of the cross bear the serial number of the award, the left arm having an embossed letter "N" at its left extremity. The class of the cross is embossed on the reverse of the lower arm, "1-я степ" for the first class, "2-я степ" for the second class, "3-я степ" for the third class and "4-я степ" for the fourth class.

The crosses first and second class are made of gilt silver, the crosses third and fourth class are made of silver. All four crosses hang from the standard Russian pentagonal mount covered with an overlapping 24mm wide silk moiré ribbon of Saint George. A bow made of the same ribbon is affixed to the crosses first and third class to distinguish them from the second and fourth class awards.

When the cross is not worn, a ribbon bar is worn on the uniform. The ribbon bar is 8mm high by 24mm wide, it bears a 7mm high golden metallic Roman numeral denoting the class of the award.

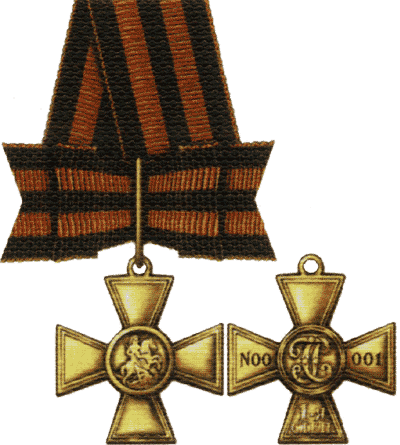
Cross of St. George 1st class

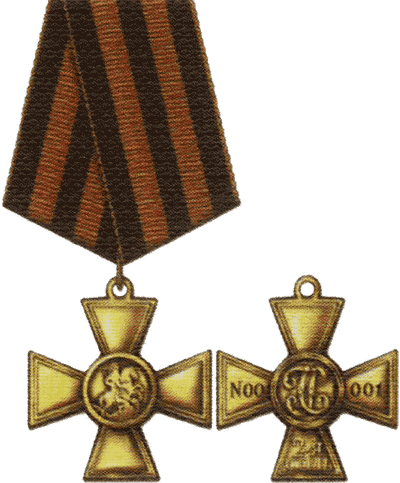
Cross of St. George 2nd class

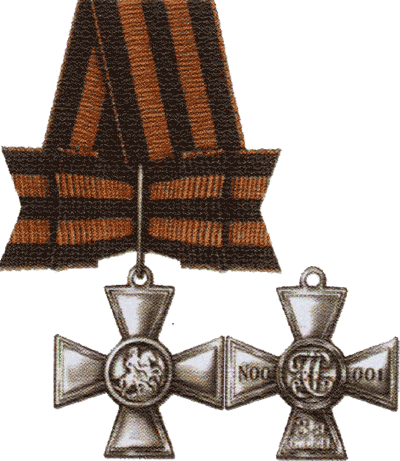
Cross of St. George 3rd class

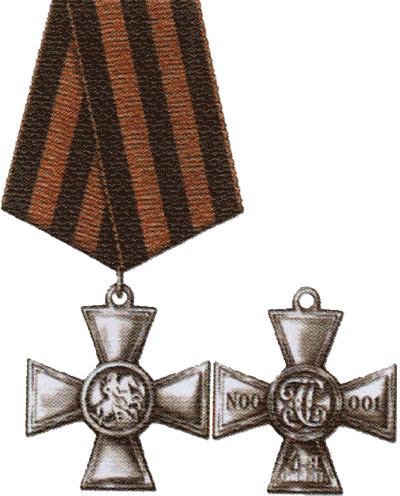
Cross of St. George 4th class
Ribbon bar for the Cross of St. George 1st class

Ribbon bar for the Cross of St. George 2nd class

Ribbon bar for the Cross of St. George 3rd class

Ribbon bar for the Cross of St. George 4th class

== See also ==
- Awards and decorations of the Russian Federation
- Order of Saint George
- Order of Glory
- Ribbon of Saint George
