= Genri Koptev-Gomolov =

Russian World War II veteran (1926–2007)

Genri Nikolaevich Koptev-Gomolov
- Born: 4 June 1926; Balashikha, Moscow Oblast
- Died: 4 June 2007 (aged 81)
- Military career
- Allegiance: Soviet Union
- Unit: 322nd Rifle Division
- Conflicts: World War II; Vistula-Oder Offensive
- Awards: Order of Glory, 3rd class Order of the Patriotic War, 2nd class

Genri Nikolaevich Koptev-Gomolov (Russian: Генри Николаевич Коптев-Гомолов; 4 June 1926 – 4 June 2007) was a Russian World War II veteran.

Koptev-Gomolov was born on 4 June 1926 in the town of Balashikha in the Moscow Oblast. Drafted into the army in 1943, got to the front in summer 1944. Served in the 1085th Rifle Regiment of the 322nd Rifle Division, commander of a 45 mm anti-tank gun. He destroyed a Nazi self-propelled gun during the liberation of Auschwitz, for which he received the Order of Glory 3rd class. Koptev-Gomolov was also awarded the Order of the Patriotic War 2nd class, and numerous medals. He died on 4 June 2007, his 81st birthday.
