= Trunovskoye, Stavropol Krai =

Trunovskoye Труновское
- Selo
- Interactive map of Trunovskoye
- Location of Trunovskoye Trunovskoye (Stavropol Krai)
- Coordinates: 45°29′N 42°09′E
- Country: Russia
- Federal subject: Stavropol Krai
- Administrative district: Trunovsky District

Population (2010 Census)
  - Total: 6,121
  - Estimate (2021): 6,227 (+1.7%)
- Time zone: UTC+3 (MSK)
- Postal code: 356181
- OKTMO ID: 07654416101

Trunovskoye (Russian: Труновское) is a rural locality (a selo) in Trunovsky District of Stavropol Krai, Russia. Population: 6,121 (2010 census); 6,345 (2002 census).
