= 2024 Stavropol Krai gubernatorial election =

← 2019	6–8 September 2024	2029 →
- Turnout: 57.38%
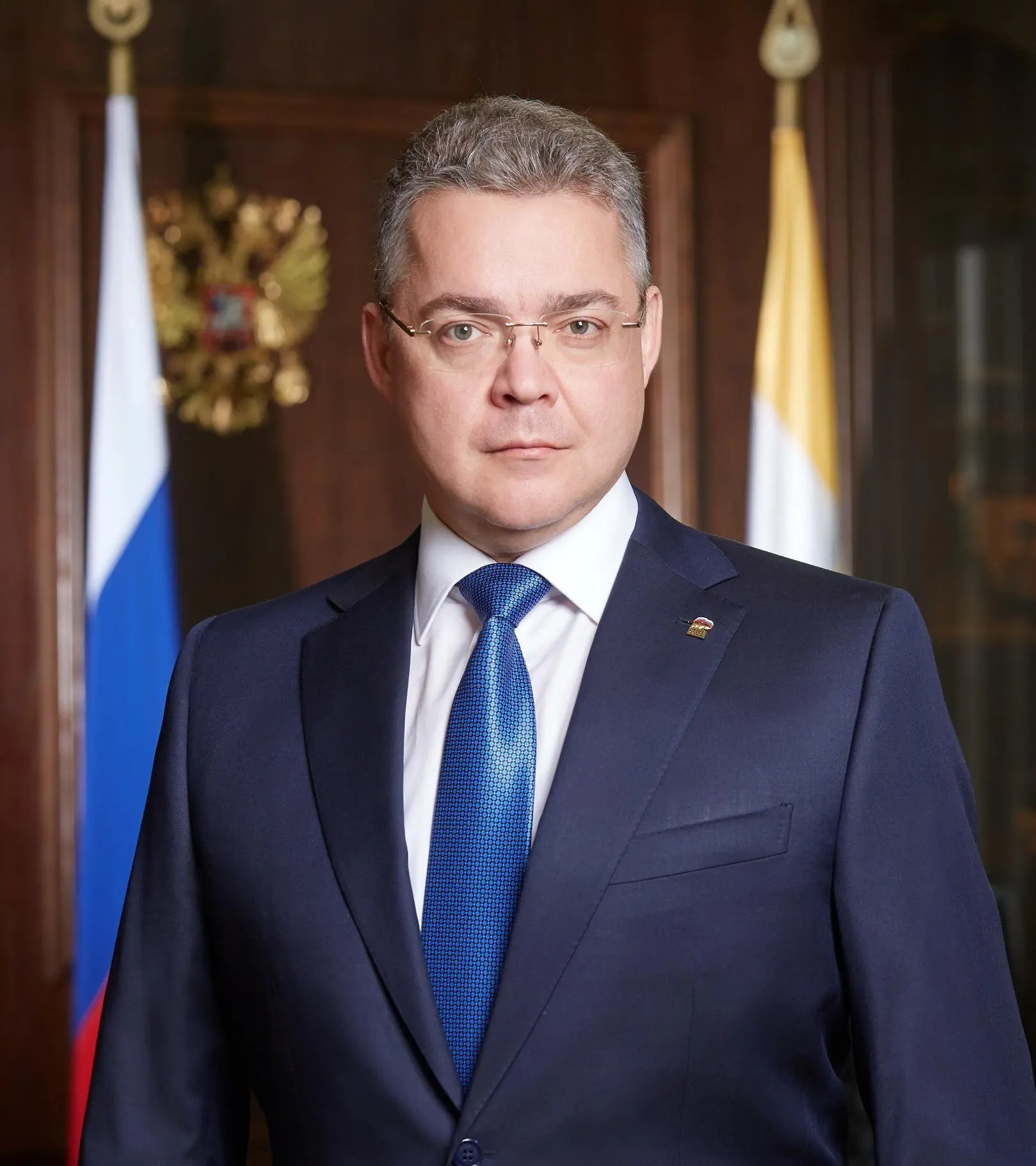

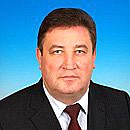
Candidate	Vladimir Vladimirov	Viktor Goncharov
Party	United Russia	CPRF
Popular vote	869,599	103,998
Percentage	79.61%	9.52%
Governor before election
Vladimir Vladimirov
United Russia
Governor-elect
Vladimir Vladimirov
United Russia

The 2024 Stavropol Krai gubernatorial election took place on 6–8 September 2024, on common election day. Incumbent Governor Vladimir Vladimirov was re-elected to a third term in office.

== Background ==
Then-First Deputy Governor of Yamalo-Nenets Autonomous Okrug Vladimir Vladimirov was appointed acting Governor of Stavropol Krai in September 2013, replacing Valery Zerenkov, who resigned just a little over a year in office. Vladimirov easily won the election for a full term in September 2014 against three opponents with 84.22% of the vote. Vladimirov ran for a second full term in 2019 and won again with 79.65%.

Initially the Governor of Stavropol was limited for just two consecutive terms so Vladimirov would have been term-limited in 2024. However, in December 2021 "On Common Principles of Organisation of Public Authority in the Subjects of the Russian Federation" law was enacted, which lifted term limits for Russian governors. Stavropol Krai followed suit and lifted the restrictions, which allowed Vladimirov to seek another term in 2024.

== Candidates ==
In Stavropol Krai candidates for Governor can be nominated only by registered political parties. Candidate for Governor of Stavropol Krai should be a Russian citizen and at least 30 years old. Candidates for Governor should not have a foreign citizenship or residence permit. Each candidate in order to be registered is required to collect at least 6% of signatures of members and heads of municipalities. Also gubernatorial candidates present 3 candidacies to the Federation Council and election winner later appoints one of the presented candidates.

=== Declared ===
Candidate name, political party		Occupation	Status	Ref.
Viktor Goncharov; Communist Party	Viktor Goncharov	First Deputy Chairman of the Duma of Stavropol Krai (2021–present); Member of the Duma (2007–2011, 2016–present); Former Member of State Duma (2011–2016); 2014 gubernatorial candidate	Registered	
Aleksandr Kuzmin; SR–ZP		Deputy Chairman of the Duma of Stavropol Krai (2003–present); 2014 and 2019 gubernatorial candidate	Registered	
Aleksandr Lyushin; Liberal Democratic Party		Former Member of Legislative Assembly of the Republic of Karelia (2011–2016)	Registered	
Boris Obolenets; New People		Former Member of Duma of Stavropol Krai (2007–2011); President of Stavropol Krai Chamber of Commerce	Registered	
Vladimir Vladimirov; United Russia		Incumbent Governor of Stavropol Krai (2013–present)	Registered	

=== Candidates for Federation Council ===
Gubernatorial candidate, political party	Candidates for Federation Council	Status
Viktor Goncharov; Communist Party	* Vasily Belchenko, pensioner * Andrey Serdyukov, Member of Duma of Predgorny District (2020–present) * Vasily Smolyakov, pensioner	Registered
Aleksandr Kuzmin; SR–ZP	* Pavel Samarin, Member of Petrovsky District Council of Deputies (2022–present) * Nikolay Shchipachev, Member of Stavropol City Duma (2021–present), sales manager * Oleg Shpunt, Member of Duma of Pyatigorsk (2016–present), financial director	Registered
Aleksandr Lyushin; Liberal Democratic Party	* Vladimir Chekhursky, Member of Duma of Pyatigorsk (2021–present), businessman * Aleksandr Kovalev, Member of Duma of Trunovsky District (2020–present) * Aleksandr Zemtsev, Member of Duma of Izobilnensky District (2012–present), businessman	Registered
Boris Obolenets; New People	* Viktor Mazurov, pensioner * Lyubov Valovaya, Vice President of Stavropol Krai Chamber of Commerce * Sergey Vladimirov, individual entrepreneur	Registered
Vladimir Vladimirov; United Russia	* Mikhail Afanasov, incumbent Senator (2012–2019, 2020–present) * Vladimir Sitnikov, Rector of Stavropol State Agrarian University (2022–present) * Nikolay Velikdan, Chairman of the Duma of Stavropol Krai (2021–present)	Registered

== Finances ==
All sums are in rubles.

Financial Report	Source	Goncharov	Kuzmin	Lyushin	Obolenets	Vladimirov
First		830,000	516,600	515,000	16,000	20,500,000
Final		TBD	TBD	TBD	TBD	44,000,000

== Results ==
Summary of the 6–8 September 2024 Stavropol Krai gubernatorial election results
Candidate	Party	Votes	%
Vladimir Vladimirov (incumbent)	United Russia	869,599	79.61
Viktor Goncharov	Communist Party	103,998	9.52
Aleksandr Kuzmin	A Just Russia – For Truth	50,993	4.67
Boris Obolenets	New People	29,441	2.70
Aleksandr Lyushin	Liberal Democratic Party	26,679	2.44
Valid votes		1,080,710	98.94
Blank ballots		11,558	1.06
Total		1,092,268	100.00
Turnout		1,092,268	57.38
Registered voters		1,903,514	100.00

Governor Vladimirov re-appointed incumbent Senator Mikhail Afanasov (United Russia) to the Federation Council.

== See also ==
- 2024 Russian regional elections
