= Petrovsky constituency =

Russian legislative constituency

Petrovsky single-member constituency
- Constituency of the Russian State Duma

- Constituency boundaries from 1993 to 2007
- Deputy: None
- Federal subject: Stavropol Krai
- Districts: Andropovsky, Apanasenkovsky, Arzgirsky, Blagodarnensky, Grachyovsky, Izobilnensky, Ipatovsky, Krasnogvardeysky, Novoalexandrovsky, Petrovsky, Trunovsky, Turkmensky
- Voters: 460,608 (2003)

The Petrovsky constituency (No.56 (Note: No.55 in 1993-1995, No.54 in 1995-2003)) was a Russian legislative constituency in Stavropol Krai in 1993–2007. It covered predominantly rural districts in central Stavropol Krai. The seat was last occupied by United Russia faction member Pavel Voronin, a businessman, who narrowly defeated first-term United Russia incumbent State Duma member and former Minister of Internal Affairs Anatoly Kulikov in the 2003 election.

The constituency was dissolved in 2007 when State Duma adopted full proportional representation for the next two electoral cycles. Petrovsky constituency was not re-established for the 2016 election, currently its territory is partitioned between Stavropol, Nevinnomyssk and Georgiyevsk constituencies.

== Boundaries ==
1993–2007: Andropovsky District, Apanasenkovsky District, Arzgirsky District, Blagodarnensky District, Grachyovsky District, Izobilnensky District, Ipatovsky District, Krasnogvardeysky District, Novoalexandrovsky District, Petrovsky District, Trunovsky District, Turkmensky District
The constituency covered mostly rural northern Stavropol Krai.

== Members elected ==
Election	Member	Party
1993	Vasily Moroz	Agrarian Party
1995	Aleksandr Chernogorov (Note: elected Governor of Stavropol Krai in November 1996)	Communist Party
1997	Vasily Khmyrov	Independent
1999	Anatoly Kulikov	Independent
2003	Pavel Voronin	Independent

== Election results ==
=== 1993 ===
==== Declared candidates ====
- Vasily Moroz (APR), director of the All-Russia Research Institute on Sheep and Goat Breeding
- Andrey Razin (Independent), singer, producer
- Gennady Titovsky (Choice of Russia), Chairman of the Novoselitsky District Committee on Property Management

==== Results ====
Summary of the 12 December 1993 Russian legislative election in the Petrovsky constituency
Candidate	Party	Votes	%
Vasily Moroz	Agrarian Party	162,033	53.92%
Andrey Razin	Independent	83,881	27.91%
Gennady Titovsky	Choice of Russia	13,682	4.55%
against all		26,140	8.70%
Total		300,498	100%

=== 1995 ===
==== Declared candidates ====
- Aleksandr Chernogorov (CPRF), former Member of Stavropol Krai Council of People's Deputies (1990–1994)
- Aleksandr Larionov (KRO), cossack activist
- Vasily Moroz (APR), incumbent Member of State Duma (1994–present)
- Valery Panin (LDPR), Stavropol State Pedagogical University senior lecturer

==== Results ====
Summary of the 17 December 1995 Russian legislative election in the Petrovsky constituency
Candidate	Party	Votes	%
Aleksandr Chernogorov	Communist Party	159,879	50.04%
Vasily Moroz (incumbent)	Agrarian Party	63,617	19.91%
Valery Panin	Liberal Democratic Party	35,544	11.13%
Aleksandr Larionov	Congress of Russian Communities	32,979	10.32%
against all		21,570	6.75%
Total		319,486	100%

=== 1997 ===
==== Declared candidates ====
- Nikolay Chachua (Independent), writer
- Vasily Khmyrov (Independent), agriculture executive
- Vasily Krasulya (Independent), former Deputy Governor of Stavropol Krai (1991–1996)
- Vasily Moroz (Independent), former Member of State Duma (1994–1995)
- Pyotr Peresetsky (Independent), journalist
- Yury Petrov (Independent)
- Vladimir Teplyakov (Independent)

==== Results ====
Summary of the 20 April 1997 by-election in the Petrovsky constituency
Candidate	Party	Votes	%
Vasily Khmyrov	Independent	61,810	34.56%
Vasily Moroz	Independent	30,428	17.01%
Yury Petrov	Independent	23,566	13.17%
Vasily Krasulya	Independent	22,125	12.37%
Nikolay Chachua	Independent	10,666	5.96%
Vladimir Teplyakov	Independent	5,824	3.25%
Pyotr Peresetsky	Independent	5,001	2.79%
Against all		13,988	7.82%
Invalid ballots		5,429	3.04%
Total		178,837	100%
Registered voters/turnout		415,037	43.09%

=== 1999 ===
==== Declared candidates ====
- Dmitry Atroshchenkov (Independent), water utilities executive
- German Barbashov (KRO-Boldyrev), nonprofit executive
- Viktor Boroday (Unity), former Representative of Governor of Stavropol Krai in Moscow (1997–1999), oil executive
- Nikolay Dushka (Independent), kolkhoz chairman
- Aleksandr Kapustyansky (Independent), housing utilities executive
- Mikhail Khlynov (DN), Chernobyl disaster victims nonprofit chairman
- Vasily Khmyrov (CPRF), incumbent Member of State Duma (1997–present)
- Anatoly Kulikov (Independent), former Minister of Internal Affairs of Russia (1995–1998)
- Valery Kolesnikov (MTM), engineer
- Vladimir Martynenko (RSP), investment businessman
- Vasily Moroz (Independent), former Member of State Duma (1994–1995), 1997 candidate for this seat
- Aleksandr Pegishev (Independent), Russian Army colonel, Hero of Russia (1995)

==== Did not file ====
- Valery Filatov (Independent)
- Mikhail Shchoka (Independent)
- Pavel Zalivanskikh (Independent)

==== Results ====
Summary of the 19 December 1999 Russian legislative election in the Petrovsky constituency
Candidate	Party	Votes	%
Anatoly Kulikov	Independent	95,160	33.97%
Vasily Khmyrov (incumbent)	Communist Party	56,832	20.29%
Viktor Boroday	Unity	23,885	8.53%
Dmitry Atroshchenkov	Independent	20,140	7.19%
Aleksandr Kapustyansky	Independent	17,888	6.39%
Nikolay Dushka	Independent	13,447	4.80%
Aleksandr Pegishev	Independent	13,334	4.76%
Vasily Moroz	Independent	6,658	2.38%
Mikhail Khlynov	Spiritual Heritage	5,393	1.93%
Valery Kolesnikov	Peace, Labour, May	1,785	0.64%
German Barbashov	Congress of Russian Communities-Yury Boldyrev Movement	1,745	0.62%
Vladimir Martynenko	Russian Socialist Party	1,525	0.54%
against all		16,506	5.89%
Total		280,113	100%

=== 2003 ===
==== Declared candidates ====
- Yury Burlutsky (CPRF), Member of State Duma (1996–present)
- Anatoly Kulikov (United Russia), incumbent Member of State Duma (2000–present)
- Mikhail Khlynov (LDPR), aide to State Duma member, 1999 DN candidate for this seat
- Valery Khuka (APR), agriculture businessman
- Viktor Sharkov (ZRS), ataman of the Stavropol Cossack Army
- Pavel Voronin (Independent), Member of Stavropol City Duma (2000–present)
- Vitaly Zubenko (Yabloko), Member of Svetlograd City Council (2001–present), attorney

==== Did not file ====
- Vladimir Zlenko (RPP-PSS), businessman

==== Results ====
Summary of the 7 December 2003 Russian legislative election in the Petrovsky constituency
Candidate	Party	Votes	%
Pavel Voronin	Independent	75,619	32.94%
Anatoly Kulikov (incumbent)	United Russia	69,005	30.06%
Yury Burlutsky	Communist Party	28,032	12.21%
Mikhail Khlynov	Liberal Democratic Party	10,258	4.47%
Valery Khuka	Agrarian Party	8,369	3.65%
Vitaly Zubenko	Yabloko	8,045	3.50%
Viktor Sharkov	For a Holy Russia	3,155	1.37%
against all		22,153	9.65%
Total		229,662	100%
