= 2026 Stavropol Krai legislative election =

Regional legislative election in Russia

- 18–20 September 2026

All 50 seats in the Duma 26 seats needed for a majority
- Turnout: 81.29% ▲14.55 pp
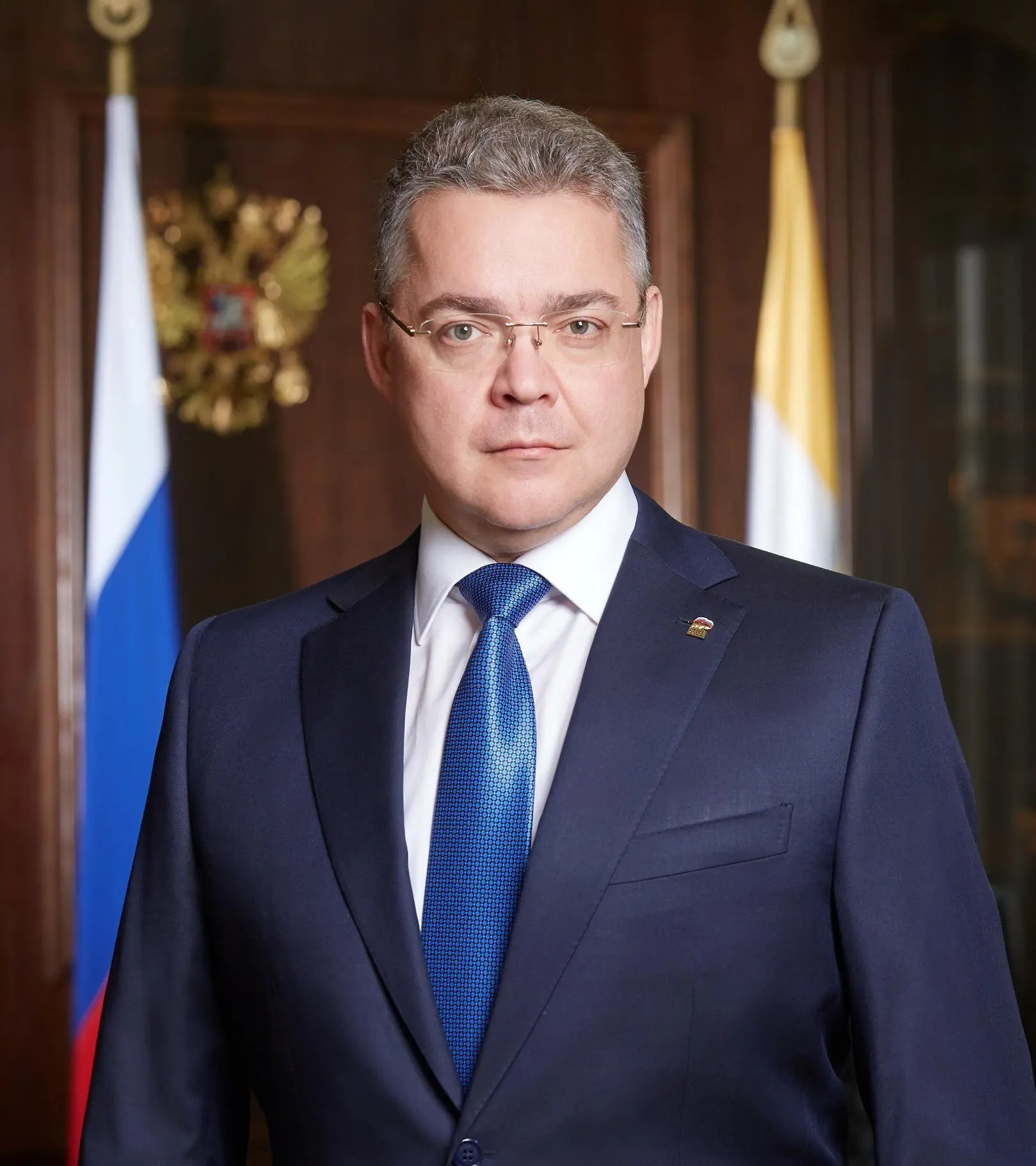

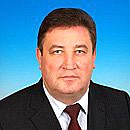

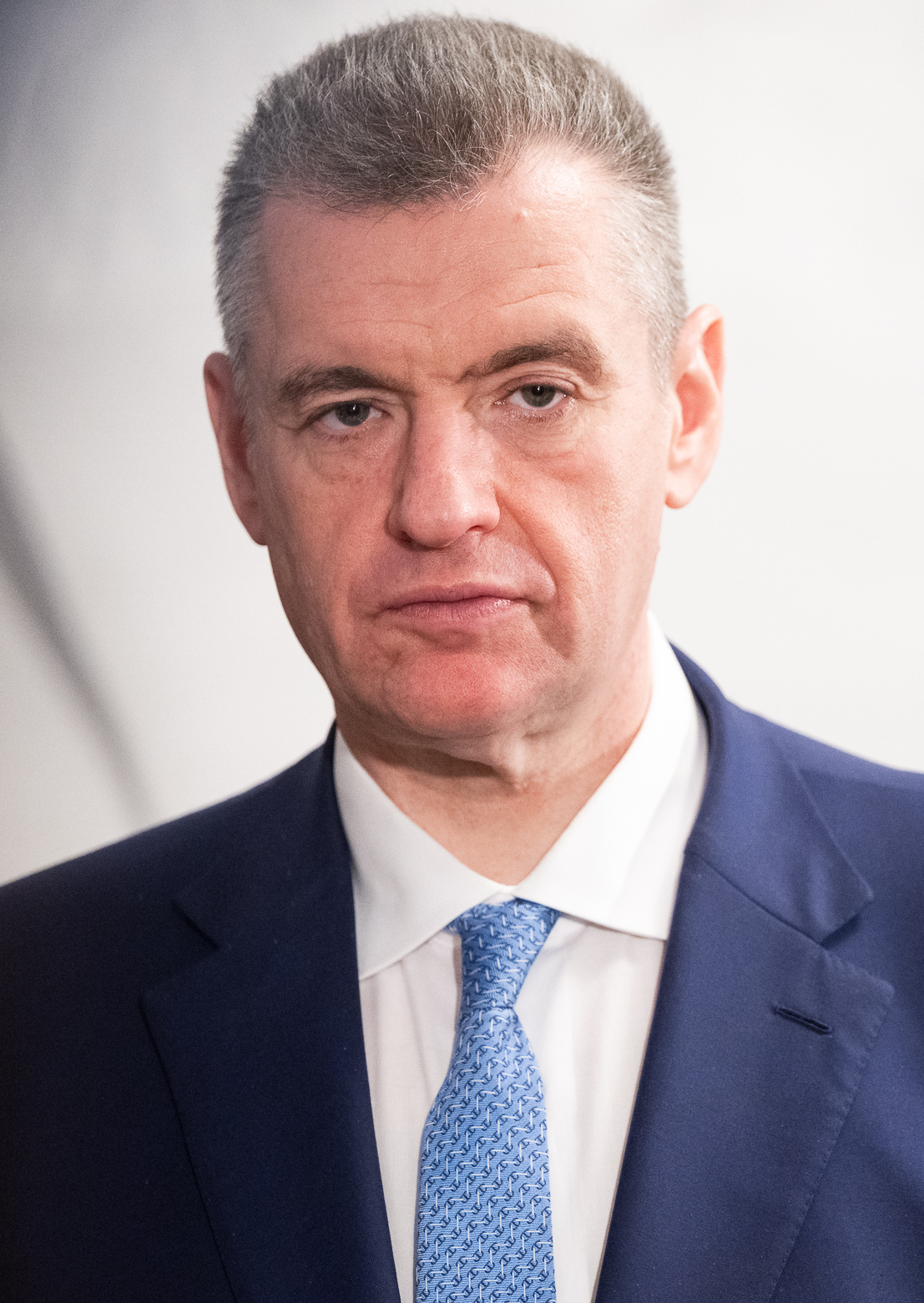
	Majority party	Minority party	Third party
			NL
Candidate	Vladimir Vladimirov	Viktor Goncharov	Stanislav Kireyev
Party	United Russia	CPRF	New People
Last election	60.34%, 43 seats	15.69%, 4 seats	3.20%, 0 seats
Seats won	44	3	1
Seat change	▲1	▼1	▲1
Popular vote	1,013,244	195,511	119,155
Percentage	65.65%	12.67%	7.72%
Swing	▲5.31 pp	▼3.04 pp	▲4.52 pp
	Fourth party	Fifth party	Sixth party
		SR	CPCR
Candidate	Leonid Slutsky	Aleksandr Kuzmin	Sergey Vorobyov
Party	LDPR	A Just Russia	Communists of Russia
Last election	4.94%, 0 seats	9.46%, 2 seats	1.76%, 0 seats
Seats won	1	1	0
Seat change	▲1	▼1	Steady
Popular vote	103,114	80,975	15,279
Percentage	6.68%	5.25%	0.99%
Swing	▲1.74 pp	▼4.21 pp	▼0.77 pp
Chairman before election
Nikolay Velikdan
United Russia
Elected Chairman
Lyubov Makovskaya
United Russia
Senator before election
Gennady Yagubov
United Russia
Senator after election
Gennady Yagubov
United Russia

The 2026 Duma of Stavropol Krai election took place on 18–20 September 2026, on common election day, coinciding with the 2026 Russian legislative election. All 50 seats in the Duma were up for re-election.

United Russia slightly increased its overwhelming majority in the Duma, winning 65.7% of the vote and all 25 single-mandate constituencies. Communist Party of the Russian Federation and A Just Russia lost one seat each. Liberal Democratic Party of Russia re-entered the Duma with one seat, while New People saw significant vote share increase, placing third.

== Electoral system ==
Under current election laws, the Duma is elected for a term of five years, with parallel voting. 25 seats are elected by party-list proportional representation with a 5% electoral threshold, with the other half elected in 25 single-member constituencies by first-past-the-post voting. Seats in the proportional part are allocated using the Imperiali quota, modified to ensure that every party list, which passes the threshold, receives at least one mandate.

== Candidates ==
=== Party lists ===
To register regional lists of candidates, parties need to collect 0.5% of signatures of all registered voters in Stavropol Krai.

The following parties were relieved from the necessity to collect signatures:

- United Russia
- Communist Party of the Russian Federation
- Liberal Democratic Party of Russia
- A Just Russia
- New People
- Communists of Russia

№	Party	Krai-wide list	Candidates	Territorial groups	Status
1	United Russia	Vladimir Vladimirov • Gennady Yagubov • Natalia Zvyagintseva	67	18	Registered
2	Communists of Russia	Sergey Vorobyov • Tatyana Bikeyeva • Konstantin Kozlov	69	25	Registered
3	A Just Russia	Aleksandr Kuzmin • Nariman Abdullayev • Andrey Bitarov	29	25	Registered
4	New People	Stanislav Kireyev • Boris Obolenets • Albert Mikhaylov	51	16	Registered
5	Communist Party	Viktor Goncharov • Viktor Lozovoy • Nikolay Vasilyev	75	25	Registered
6	Liberal Democratic Party	Leonid Slutsky • Nadezhda Piltenko	67	25	Registered

Russian Party of Pensioners for Social Justice, which participated in the last election, did not file.

=== Single-mandate constituencies ===
25 single-mandate constituencies were formed in Stavropol Krai. To register candidates in single-mandate constituencies need to collect 3% of signatures of registered voters in the constituency.

Number of candidates in single-mandate constituencies
Party	Candidates	
Party	Nominated	Registered
United Russia	25	25
Communist Party	24	22
A Just Russia	25	25
Liberal Democratic Party	24	24
New People	25	24
Communists of Russia	3	3
Independent	5	0
Total	131	123

== Results ==
=== Results by party lists ===
Summary of the 18–20 September 2026 Duma of Stavropol Krai election results
Party	Party list					Constituency		Total	
Party	Votes	%	±pp	Seats	+/–	Seats	+/–	Seats	+/–
United Russia	1,013,244	65.65	▲5.31	19	Steady	25	▲1	44	▲1
Communist Party	195,511	12.67	▼3.04	3	▼1	0	Steady	3	▼1
New People	119,155	7.72	▲4.52	1	▲1	0	Steady	1	▲1
Liberal Democratic Party	103,114	6.68	▲1.74	1	▲1	0	Steady	1	▲1
A Just Russia	80,975	5.25	▼4.21	1	▼1	0	Steady	1	▼1
Communists of Russia	15,279	0.99	▼0.77	0	Steady	0	Steady	0	Steady
Invalid ballots	16,115	1.04	▼1.10	—	—	—	—	—	—
Total	1,543,393	100.00	—	25	Steady	25	Steady	50	Steady
Turnout	1,543,393	81.29	▲14.55	—	—	—	—	—	—
Registered voters	1,898,717	100.00	—	—	—	—	—	—	—

Deputy Chief of Staff to the Government of Stavropol Krai Lyubov Makovskaya (United Russia) was elected Chairwoman of the Duma after outgoing Chairman Nikolay Velikdan (United Russia) died on September 25, 2026. Incumbent Senator Gennady Yagubov (United Russia) was re-appointed to the Federation Council.

=== Results in single-member constituencies ===
==== District 1 ====
Summary of the 18–20 September 2026 Duma of Stavropol Krai election in District 1
Candidate	Party	Votes	%
Lyubov Makovskaya	United Russia	41,578	74.23%
Andrey Nikulnikov	Liberal Democratic Party	5,739	10.25%
Valery Dodukh	A Just Russia	3,028	5.41%
Vladimir Kasharny	Communist Party	2,920	5.21%
Armen Avanesyan	New People	1,735	3.10%
Total		56,009	100%

==== District 2 ====
Summary of the 18–20 September 2026 Duma of Stavropol Krai election in District 2
Candidate	Party	Votes	%
Igor Andryushchenko (incumbent)	United Russia	35,668	64.29%
Vladimir Pchelenko	Communist Party	6,539	11.79%
Artur Milchenko	New People	4,681	8.44%
Andrey Shcherbakov	A Just Russia	3,830	6.90%
Larisa Linchenko	Liberal Democratic Party	3,780	6.81%
Total		55,478	100%

==== District 3 ====
Summary of the 18–20 September 2026 Duma of Stavropol Krai election in District 3
Candidate	Party	Votes	%
Pyotr Korotchenko (incumbent)	United Russia	22,146	47.39%
Oleg Sakhnov	Communist Party	7,090	15.17%
Aleksey Dzyuba	New People	7,002	14.98%
Danil Yermakov	Liberal Democratic Party	4,813	10.30%
Yekaterina Smorodina	A Just Russia	4,743	10.15%
Total		46,735	100%

==== District 4 ====
Summary of the 18–20 September 2026 Duma of Stavropol Krai election in District 4
Candidate	Party	Votes	%
Viktor Lustin	United Russia	38,684	64.84%
Aleksey Gribov	Communist Party	10,268	17.21%
Dmitry Lazarev	A Just Russia	6,605	11.07%
Vigen Stepanyan	Liberal Democratic Party	2,009	3.37%
Armen Akopov	New People	1,489	2.50%
Total		59,660	100%

==== District 5 ====
Summary of the 18–20 September 2026 Duma of Stavropol Krai election in District 5
Candidate	Party	Votes	%
Nikolay Lopatin (incumbent)	United Russia	35,054	57.46%
Maksim Borkovsky	Communist Party	7,736	12.68%
Nadezhda Piltenko	Liberal Democratic Party	7,729	12.67%
Nariman Abdullayev	A Just Russia	4,887	8.01%
Gadzhimurad Bagatyrov	New People	3,776	6.19%
Total		61,006	100%

==== District 6 ====
Summary of the 18–20 September 2026 Duma of Stavropol Krai election in District 6
Candidate	Party	Votes	%
Igor Nikolayev (incumbent)	United Russia	41,635	66.65%
Mikhail Sergeyev	Communist Party	11,074	17.73%
Andrey Zhukov	New People	2,996	4.80%
Sergey Makhonin	Liberal Democratic Party	2,565	4.11%
Artyom Mesropyan	A Just Russia	2,263	3.62%
Konstantin Kozlov	Communists of Russia	1,062	1.70%
Total		62,470	100%

==== District 7 ====
Summary of the 18–20 September 2026 Duma of Stavropol Krai election in District 7
Candidate	Party	Votes	%
Aleksandr Sidorkov (incumbent)	United Russia	36,014	59.79%
Aleksandr Zemtsev	Liberal Democratic Party	7,858	13.05%
Nikolay Shchipachev	A Just Russia	7,815	12.97%
Vladislav Titov	New People	7,464	12.39%
Total		60,234	100%

==== District 8 ====
Summary of the 18–20 September 2026 Duma of Stavropol Krai election in District 8
Candidate	Party	Votes	%
Kirill Andrianov	United Russia	46,322	65.81%
Aleksandr Tikhon	Communist Party	9,455	13.43%
Yevgeny Kuznetsov	A Just Russia	7,758	11.02%
Sergey Voytsekhovsky	New People	4,435	6.30%
Total		70,386	100%

==== District 9 ====
Summary of the 18–20 September 2026 Duma of Stavropol Krai election in District 9
Candidate	Party	Votes	%
Yury Gontar (incumbent)	United Russia	36,486	66.57%
Roman Likhodedov	Liberal Democratic Party	8,214	14.99%
Svetlana Koskova	A Just Russia	5,594	10.21%
Antonina Safonova	New People	3,665	6.69%
Total		54,811	100%

==== District 10 ====
Summary of the 18–20 September 2026 Duma of Stavropol Krai election in District 10
Candidate	Party	Votes	%
Nikolay Murashko (incumbent)	United Russia	35,906	57.50%
Ivan Gribov	Communist Party	8,061	12.91%
Akhmat Baichorov	Liberal Democratic Party	6,832	10.94%
Roman Demyanov	A Just Russia	6,158	9.86%
Ummakhan Chopanov	New People	4,859	7.78%
Total		62,446	100%

==== District 11 ====
Summary of the 18–20 September 2026 Duma of Stavropol Krai election in District 11
Candidate	Party	Votes	%
Anatoly Antonenko	United Russia	37,705	59.78%
Oleg Barinov	Communist Party	8,010	12.70%
Aleksandr Migulin	A Just Russia	6,859	10.88%
Andrey Zhuravel	Liberal Democratic Party	5,872	9.31%
Olga Perepechenova	New People	2,965	4.70%
Total		63,071	100%

==== District 12 ====
Summary of the 18–20 September 2026 Duma of Stavropol Krai election in District 12
Candidate	Party	Votes	%
Aleksandr Reznikov	United Russia	40,169	60.60%
Maksim Kondratyev	New People	9,455	14.26%
Aleksandr Shiforostov	Communist Party	6,023	9.09%
Aleksandr Kozlov	A Just Russia	5,369	8.10%
Nikita Ibragimov	Liberal Democratic Party	3,977	6.00%
Total		66,285	100%

==== District 13 ====
Summary of the 18–20 September 2026 Duma of Stavropol Krai election in District 13
Candidate	Party	Votes	%
Oleg Maslin	United Russia	43,541	62.96%
Ramazan Batchayev	Communist Party	9,066	13.11%
Dmitry Pastyrev	Liberal Democratic Party	8,882	12.84%
Tatyana Bikeyeva	Communists of Russia	4,614	6.67%
Valery Gudkov	A Just Russia	1,434	2.07%
Andrey Petrenko	New People	1,050	1.52%
Total		69,162	100%

==== District 14 ====
Summary of the 18–20 September 2026 Duma of Stavropol Krai election in District 14
Candidate	Party	Votes	%
Yury Omelchenko	United Russia	41,465	57.86%
Roman Kondratov	Communist Party	9,276	12.94%
Vitaly Ponomarev	Liberal Democratic Party	8,301	11.58%
Maria Semenchenko	New People	7,385	10.30%
Yelena Solodova	A Just Russia	4,497	6.27%
Total		71,666	100%

==== District 15 ====
Summary of the 18–20 September 2026 Duma of Stavropol Krai election in District 15
Candidate	Party	Votes	%
Zaurbek Sherpeyev (incumbent)	United Russia	33,829	65.28%
Magomed Kurbanov	Communist Party	6,511	12.56%
Dzhamilya Antonova	Liberal Democratic Party	4,133	7.98%
Yekaterina Nesolenova	New People	4,022	7.76%
Ismail Kurbanov	A Just Russia	2,307	4.45%
Total		51,822	100%

==== District 16 ====
Summary of the 18–20 September 2026 Duma of Stavropol Krai election in District 16
Candidate	Party	Votes	%
Anatoly Zhdanov (incumbent)	United Russia	37,500	65.98%
Yevgeny Nedonoskov	Communist Party	6,264	11.02%
Aleksey Kisterev	A Just Russia	4,730	8.32%
Yevgeny Alferov	Liberal Democratic Party	3,876	6.82%
Artur Krutin	New People	3,073	5.41%
Total		56,839	100%

==== District 17 ====
Summary of the 18–20 September 2026 Duma of Stavropol Krai election in District 17
Candidate	Party	Votes	%
Dmitry Sudavtsov (incumbent)	United Russia	44,964	65.96%
Tamerlan Chershembeyev	Communist Party	18,163	26.64%
Vasily Samokhin	Liberal Democratic Party	2,681	3.93%
Viktoria Zanko	A Just Russia	1,021	1.50%
Nikolay Barkar	New People	1,001	1.47%
Total		68,172	100%

==== District 18 ====
Summary of the 18–20 September 2026 Duma of Stavropol Krai election in District 18
Candidate	Party	Votes	%
Larisa Pavlovskaya	United Russia	34,391	56.89%
Nikita Kruglov	Communist Party	10,838	17.93%
Leonid Chernigovsky	Liberal Democratic Party	10,168	16.82%
Pavel Samarin	A Just Russia	4,437	7.34%
Total		60,453	100%

==== District 19 ====
Summary of the 18–20 September 2026 Duma of Stavropol Krai election in District 19
Candidate	Party	Votes	%
Nikolay Royev (incumbent)	United Russia	23,786	53.42%
Andrey Serdyukov	Communist Party	7,845	17.62%
Georgy Balashov	Liberal Democratic Party	4,251	9.55%
Sergey Vorobyev	Communists of Russia	3,327	7.47%
Vladimir Medalyan	New People	2,182	4.90%
Natalya Khvoyko	A Just Russia	1,864	4.19%
Total		44,523	100%

==== District 20 ====
Summary of the 18–20 September 2026 Duma of Stavropol Krai election in District 20
Candidate	Party	Votes	%
Aleksandr Nikonov	United Russia	38,924	56.16%
Roman Bystryukov	Communist Party	10,475	15.11%
Yekaterina Arzumanova	New People	7,079	10.21%
Yury Suravtsov	Liberal Democratic Party	6,605	9.53%
Yury Zverev	A Just Russia	5,958	8.60%
Total		69,305	100%

==== District 21 ====
Summary of the 18–20 September 2026 Duma of Stavropol Krai election in District 21
Candidate	Party	Votes	%
Valentin Argashokov (incumbent)	United Russia	42,168	66.86%
Yevgeny Mesropov	New People	9,288	14.73%
Yelena Tsmakova	A Just Russia	6,427	10.19%
Dmitry Ryabchenko	Liberal Democratic Party	4,289	6.80%
Total		63,065	100%

==== District 22 ====
Summary of the 18–20 September 2026 Duma of Stavropol Krai election in District 22
Candidate	Party	Votes	%
Zhanik Goncharov (incumbent)	United Russia	41,492	67.95%
Oleg Shpunt	A Just Russia	8,603	14.09%
Sergey Shapovalov	Liberal Democratic Party	5,260	8.61%
Sergey Stepashkin	New People	3,436	5.63%
Denis Yelovsky	Communist Party	1,503	2.46%
Total		61,061	100%

==== District 23 ====
Summary of the 18–20 September 2026 Duma of Stavropol Krai election in District 23
Candidate	Party	Votes	%
Vladimir Stasenko	United Russia	31,837	55.28%
Viktor Lozovoy	Communist Party	10,128	17.58%
Konstantin Zelensky	A Just Russia	8,600	14.93%
Vitaly Pashin	Liberal Democratic Party	4,560	7.92%
Natalya Chugay	New People	1,399	2.43%
Total		57,595	100%

==== District 24 ====
Summary of the 18–20 September 2026 Duma of Stavropol Krai election in District 24
Candidate	Party	Votes	%
Aleksandr Gordeyev	United Russia	38,332	53.57%
Kirill Medevedev	Communist Party	11,059	15.46%
Boris Obolenets	New People	9,717	13.58%
Violetta Filippova	Liberal Democratic Party	7,520	10.51%
Anastasia Solodova	A Just Russia	4,591	6.42%
Total		71,549	100%

==== District 25 ====
Summary of the 18–20 September 2026 Duma of Stavropol Krai election in District 25
Candidate	Party	Votes	%
Sergey Chursinov (incumbent)	United Russia	47,570	64.16%
Aleksey Rezvenko	A Just Russia	9,687	13.06%
Yegor Gerasimenko	Communist Party	7,129	9.61%
Denis Yakubov	New People	4,222	5.69%
Aleksandr Kolomin	Liberal Democratic Party	3,676	4.96%
Total		74,146	100%

=== Members ===
Incumbent deputies are highlighted with bold, elected members who declined to take a seat are marked with ~~strikethrough~~.

Constituency
No.	Member	Party
1	Lyubov Makovskaya	United Russia
2	Igor Andryushchenko	United Russia
3	Pyotr Korotchenko	United Russia
4	Viktor Lustin	United Russia
5	Nikolay Lopatin	United Russia
6	Igor Nikolayev	United Russia
7	Aleksandr Sidorkov	United Russia
8	Kirill Andrianov	United Russia
9	Yury Gontar	United Russia
10	Nikolay Murashko	United Russia
11	Anatoly Antonenko	United Russia
12	Aleksandr Reznikov	United Russia
13	Oleg Maslin	United Russia
14	Yury Omelchenko	United Russia
15	Zaurbek Sherpeyev	United Russia
16	Anatoly Zhdanov	United Russia
17	Dmitry Sudavtsov	United Russia
18	Larisa Pavlovskaya	United Russia
19	Nikolay Royev	United Russia
20	Aleksandr Nikonov	United Russia
21	Valentin Argashokov	United Russia
22	Zhanik Goncharov	United Russia
23	Vladimir Stasenko	United Russia
24	Aleksandr Gordeyev	United Russia
25	Sergey Chursinov	United Russia

Party lists
Member	Party
~~Vladimir Vladimirov~~	United Russia
Gennady Yagubov	United Russia
Natalia Zvyagintseva	United Russia
Vladimir Sitnikov	United Russia
Yury Skvortsov	United Russia
Andrey Petrenko	United Russia
Yury Khodzhayev	United Russia
Boris Dontsov	United Russia
Igor Lavrov	United Russia
Sergey Shevelyov	United Russia
~~Nikolay Velikdan~~	United Russia
Ivan Yakimenko	United Russia
Olga Drozdova	United Russia
Igor Tapsiyev	United Russia
Vladimir Shevchenko	United Russia
Mikhail Tkachev	United Russia
Aleksey Ivanov	United Russia
Viktor Mazharov	United Russia
Aleksandr Oldak	United Russia
Vladimir Savchenko	United Russia
Viktor Nadein	United Russia
Viktor Goncharov	Communist Party
Viktor Lozovoy	Communist Party
Nikolay Vasilyev	Communist Party
Stanislav Kireyev	New People
~~Leonid Slutsky~~	Liberal Democratic Party
Nadezhda Piltenko	Liberal Democratic Party
Aleksandr Kuzmin	A Just Russia

== See also ==
- 2026 Russian regional elections
