= Divny =

Divny (Russian: Дивный; masculine), Divnaya (Дивная; feminine), or Divnoye (Дивное; neuter) is the name of several rural localities in Russia:

- Divny, Krasnodar Krai, a settlement in Volnensky Rural Okrug of Uspensky District of Krasnodar Krai
- Divny, Krasnoyarsk Krai, a settlement in Chulymsky Selsoviet of Novosyolovsky District of Krasnoyarsk Krai
- Divny, Rostov Oblast, a settlement in Istominskoye Rural Settlement of Aksaysky District of Rostov Oblast
- Divny, Ulyanovsk Oblast, a settlement in Ryazanovsky Rural Okrug of Melekessky District of Ulyanovsk Oblast
- Divnoye, Baltiysky District, Kaliningrad Oblast, a settlement in Divny Rural Okrug of Baltiysky District of Kaliningrad Oblast
- Divnoye, Gvardeysky District, Kaliningrad Oblast, a settlement in Zorinsky Rural Okrug of Gvardeysky District of Kaliningrad Oblast
- Divnoye, Nesterovsky District, Kaliningrad Oblast, a settlement in Ilyushinsky Rural Okrug of Nesterovsky District of Kaliningrad Oblast
- Divnoye, Stavropol Krai, a selo in Apanasenkovsky District of Stavropol Krai
