= Sergey Melikov =

Russian politician and military officer (born 1965)

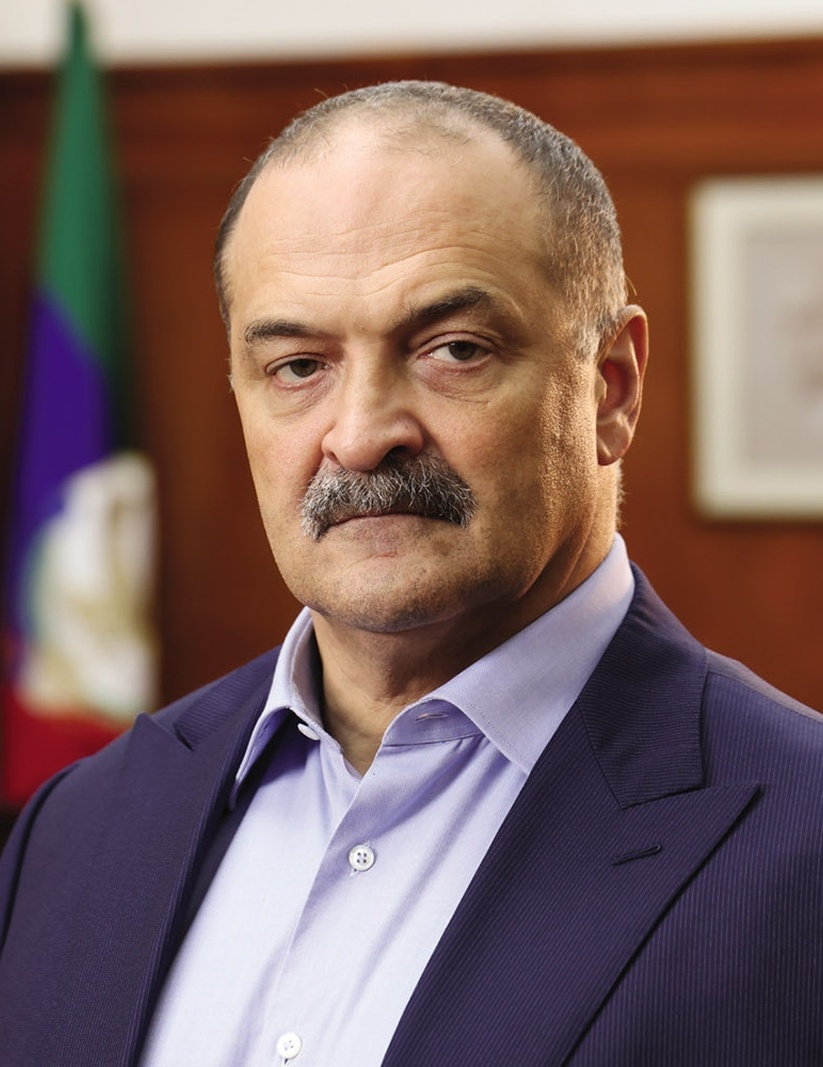
- Official portrait, 2025

5th Head of the Republic of Dagestan
- In office 14 October 2021 – 4 May 2026; Acting: 5 October 2020 – 14 October 2021
- President: Vladimir Putin
- Preceded by: Vladimir Vasilyev
- Succeeded by: Fyodor Shchukin (acting)

Senator from Stavropol Krai
- In office 27 September 2019 – 5 October 2020
- Governor: Vladimir Vladimirov
- Preceded by: Mikhail Afanasov
- Succeeded by: Mikhail Afanasov

First Deputy Director and Commander-in-Chief of the National Guard of Russia
- In office 28 June 2016 – 27 September 2019
- Preceded by: Office established
- Succeeded by: Viktor Strigunov

Presidential Envoy to the North Caucasus Federal District
- In office 12 May 2012 – 28 June 2016
- President: Vladimir Putin
- Preceded by: Alexander Khloponin
- Succeeded by: Oleg Belaventsev

Personal details
- Born: Sergey Alimovich Melikov; 12 September 1965 (age 61) Orekhovo-Zuyevo, Russian SFSR, Soviet Union
- Party: United Russia
- Spouse: Galina Melikova
- Relations: Mikhail Melikov (brother)
- Children: 1
- Parent(s): Alim Nur-Magomedovich Melikov (father); Tatyana Nikolaevna (mother)
- Education: Frunze Military Academy; General Staff Military Academy

Military service
- Allegiance: Soviet Union (1986-1991); Russia (2016-2019)
- Branch/service: National Guard of Russia
- Years of service: 1986-2014; 2016-2019
- Rank: Colonel General
- Battles/wars: First Chechen War

Sergey Alimovich Melikov (Russian: Сергей Алимович Меликов, Lezgian: Меликарин Алиман хва Селимгерей; born 12 September 1965) is a Russian politician and former military officer who served as the 5th Head of the Republic of Dagestan from 14 October 2021 to 4 May 2026. Previously he served as Senator from Stavropol Krai from 2019 to 2020. He was the First Deputy Director and Commander-in-Chief of the Russian National Guard from 2016 to 2019. Melikov was also the presidential envoy to the North Caucasian Federal District from 2014 to 2016.

Melikov has the military rank of Colonel General and the federal state civilian service rank of 1st class Active State Councillor of the Russian Federation.

== Biography ==
=== Early life ===
Sergey Melikov was born on 12 September 1965 in the town of Orekhovo-Zuyevo near Moscow, to a family of service members. His mother was Russian, and his father a Lezgin.

=== Military career ===
In 1986, Melikov graduated from the Saratov Higher Military Command Red Banner School of Internal Troops named after F. E. Dzerzhinsky with a degree in intelligence. After graduating, he was assigned as an officer for military service in a separate brigade of the Directorate of Internal Troops of the Soviet Union in the Ukrainian SSR and the Moldovian SSR, served in Lvov, and Odessa, from the school. He was a member of the Communist Party. In 1994, he graduated from the Faculty of Border and Internal Troops of the Frunze Military Academy.

Between 1994 and 1996, Melikov served in the First Chechen War. From 1994 to 1995, he held the positions of senior assistant chief of staff of the regiment, and then battalion commander of the operational division. Since 1995, he has been a senior officer of the military intelligence section of the headquarters intelligence department. In 1996, he was appointed chief of staff and a deputy commander of the operational regiment of the operational division until 1997. In 1997, he was appointed deputy commander, and in 1998, he was promoted to commander of the 2nd regiment of the Separate Operational Purpose Division of the Internal Troops of Russia.

In March 2001, he took up the post of deputy commander of this division. In June 2002, he became its commander.

After completing his studies, Melikov was transferred to the North Caucasus District with the Internal Troops of the Ministry of Internal Affairs. In April 2008, he was appointed Chief of Staff, and First Deputy Commander of the Central Regional Command of the Internal Troops of the Ministry of Internal Affairs.

On 31 August 2011, Melikov graduated from the Military Academy of the General Staff of the Armed Forces of Russia. On the same day, by decree of the President of Russia, he was appointed commander of the Joint Group of Forces (forces) for conducting counter-terrorist operations in the North Caucasus region of the Russian Federation as the First Deputy Commander of the North Caucasus Caucasian Regional Command of Internal Troops of the Ministry of Internal Affairs.

On 8 May 2014, Melikov was appointed First Deputy Chief of the Main Staff of the Internal Troops of the Ministry of Internal Affairs. The headquarters was headed by Colonel-General Sergey Bunin.

=== Presidential Envoy to the North Caucasus Federal District ===
On 12 May 2014, Melikov was appointed Presidential Envoy to the North Caucasus Federal District. On the same day, he was added to the Security Council of the Russian Federation by presidential decree. The following month, Melikov was dismissed from military service with official date of his discharge being the day of his appointment as Presidential Envoy, with the rank of lieutenant general. He was also awarded the rank of State Councilor of the Russian Federation, 1st class.

On 28 July 2016, Melikov was relieved of his post as Plenipotentiary Representative and was appointed First Deputy Director of the Federal Service of the National Guard Troops of the Russian Federation and a Commander-in-Chief of the Russian national guard. By presidential decree of 12 August, his membership of the Security Council was revoked.

=== Service in the National Guard ===
On 26 August 2016, by decree of the President of Russia, Melikov was awarded the military rank of Colonel General.

In 2017, RBC reported in speculation that Melikov was considered be a candidate for the next head of the Republic of Dagestan.

In June 2019, he submitted his resignation from the post of First Deputy Director of the Federal Service of the Russian National Guard.

=== Return to public service ===
On 27 September 2019, the Governor of Stavropol Krai, Vladimir Vladimirov, appointed Melikov as Senator of the Federation Council from Stavropol Krai. On 5 October 2020, the powers were terminated as Melikov, by decree of the President of Russia, was appointed Acting Head of the Republic of Dagestan. In June 2021, he was elected secretary of the United Russia party branch in Dagestan. On 14 October 2021, the parliament of Dagestan elected him as the 5th Head of Dagestan.

He was a member of the Board of Trustees of the Hero of Russia Foundation Colonel General Anatoly Romanov.

On 30 April 2026, President Vladimir Putin announced Melikov's resignation, with Melikov intending to resign in September. Putin nominated Fyodor Shchukin as his replacement, though there are three other candidates.

=== Sanctions ===
He is under personal international sanctions from all countries in the European Union, the United Kingdom, the United States, Australia, Ukraine and New Zealand in relation to Russia's actions in Ukraine.

== Awards ==
- Order "For Merit to the Fatherland"
- Order of Alexander Nevsky
- Order of Courage
- Order of Military Merit
- Order of Honour
- Medal of Zhukov
- Jubilee Medal "300 Years of the Russian Navy"
- Jubilee Medal "70 Years of the Armed Forces of the USSR"
- Medal "Participant of the military operation in Syria"
- Medal "200th Years of the Ministry of Defense"
- Medal "For Commonwealth in the Name of Salvation"
- Medal "200 Years of the MVD of Russia"
- Awards of the Ministry of Internal Affairs of Russia
- Order For Services to the Republic of Dagestan
- Order of Kadyrov
- Medal "Combat Commonwealth" (Syria)
- Order of St. Sergius of Radonezh

== Personal life ==
Melikov has an ethnic Lezgin father, and a Russian mother. His father, Alim Nur-Magomedovich (1932–2012), was a retired colonel, commander of a brigade of internal troops of the USSR Ministry of Internal Affairs. His mother, Tatyana Nikolayevna, was a teacher.

His older brother, Mikhail (born 2 February 1958), is a major general in the reserves, who graduated from the Leningrad Combined Arms Command School, and served in various positions up to battalion commander in the Airborne Forces. Mikhail was later transferred to the Internal Troops of the Ministry of Internal Affairs, as he commanded a regiment of Internal Troops in Yaroslavl. From 1998 to 1999, he was the commander of the 1st Operational Regiment of the Separate Operational Division of the Internal Troops of the Ministry of Internal Affairs. From 1999 to 2001, Mikhail Melikov was the commander of the 1st Special Purpose Regiment "Vityaz" of the Internal Troops of the Ministry of Internal Affairs, chairman of the public organization of veterans of special forces an operational division of the Internal Troops of the Ministry of Internal Affairs in Novocherkassk.

Sergey's wife, Galina Melikova, is a military doctor. Their son, Mikhail, studied at the Military University of the Ministry of Defence as of July 2018. Their stepson Dmitry Serkov (1981 - 2 August 2007), served in the 1st Red Banner Special Forces "Vityaz", and was the commander of the assault group of the 1st platoon of the 1st group of the unit. Serkov died on 2 August 2007 in Dagestan during a combat mission. In December 2007, Serkov was posthumously awarded the title of Hero of the Russian Federation.

Melikov is an Orthodox Christian in a Muslim-majority region.
