= Nevinnomyssk constituency =

Constituency in Russia

Nevinnomyssk single-member constituency
- Constituency of the Russian State Duma

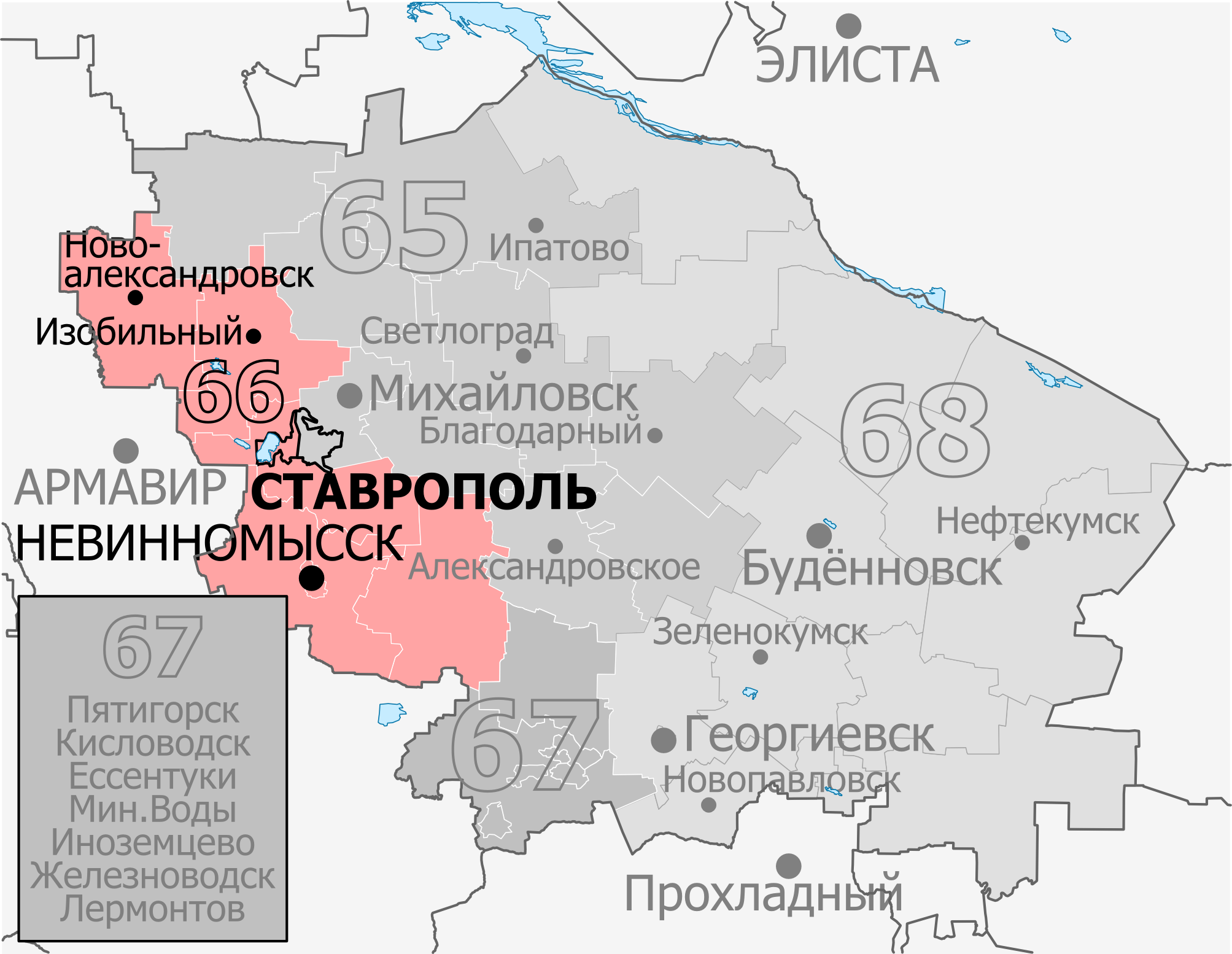
- Constituency boundaries since 2016
- Deputy: Dmitry Shuvayev; United Russia
- Federal subject: Stavropol Krai
- Districts: Andropovsky, Izobilnensky, Kochubeyevsky, Nevinnomyssk, Novoalexandrovsky, Shpakovsky (Deminsky, Novomaryevskaya, Sengileyevsky, Tatarsky, Temnolessky, Tsimlyansky, Verkhnerussky), Stavropol (Promyshlenny)
- Voters: 470,321 (2026)

The Nevinnomyssk constituency (No.70 (Note: No.66 in 2016–2026)) is a Russian legislative constituency in Stavropol Krai. The constituency covers western Stavropol and western Stavropol Krai.

The constituency has been represented since 2026 by United Russia deputy Dmitry Shuvayev, former Member of Duma of Stavropol Krai, who won the open seat after defeating three-term United Russia incumbent Olga Timofeyeva in the primary.

== Boundaries ==
2016–present: Andropovsky District, Izobilnensky District, Kochubeyevsky District, Nevinnomyssk, Novoalexandrovsky District, Shpakovsky District (Deminsky, Novomaryevskaya, Sengileyevsky, Tatarsky, Temnolessky, Tsimlyansky, Verkhnerussky), Stavropol (Promyshlenny)
The constituency was created for the 2016 election from most of former Stavropol constituency, including western Stavropol and Nevinnomyssk, and northwestern part of the dissolved Petrovsky constituency.

== Members elected ==
Election	Member	Party
2016	Aleksandr Ishchenko	United Russia
2021	Olga Timofeyeva	United Russia
2026	Dmitry Shuvayev	United Russia

== Election results ==
=== 2016 ===
Summary of the 18 September 2016 Russian legislative election in the Nevinnomyssk constituency
Candidate	Party	Votes	%
Aleksandr Ishchenko	United Russia	101,595	48.25%
Viktor Goncharov	Communist Party	28,039	13.32%
Ilya Drozdov	Liberal Democratic Party	27,063	12.85%
Sergey Gorlo	A Just Russia	15,543	7.38%
Ivan Kolesnikov	Communists of Russia	7,911	3.76%
Viktor Ilyinov	The Greens	4,565	2.17%
Valery Ledovskoy	Yabloko	4,406	2.09%
Georgy Bolshov	Patriots of Russia	3,951	1.88%
Vladimir Smirnov	Party of Growth	3,588	1.70%
Vladimir Nazarenko	Rodina	3,352	1.59%
Total		210,547	100%

=== 2021 ===
Summary of the 17-19 September 2021 Russian legislative election in the Nevinnomyssk constituency
Candidate	Party	Votes	%
Olga Timofeyeva	United Russia	233,145	64.09%
Grigory Ponomarenko	Communist Party	38,291	10.53%
Kirill Kuzmin	A Just Russia — For Truth	21,611	5.94%
Aleksandr Kurilenko	Liberal Democratic Party	20,233	5.56%
Konstantin Kozlov	Communists of Russia	13,090	3.60%
Vladimir Zelensky	Party of Pensioners	11,429	3.14%
Stanislav Kireyev	New People	9,977	2.74%
Nikolay Sasin	Party of Growth	4,634	1.27%
Asmik Khachatryan	Rodina	3,748	1.03%
Total		363,768	100%

=== 2026 ===
Summary of the 18-20 September 2026 Russian legislative election in the Nevinnomyssk constituency
Candidate	Party	Votes	%
Dmitry Shuvayev	United Russia	269,220	68.13%
Roman Kondratov	Communist Party	48,537	12.28%
Maria Semenchenko	New People	37,763	9.56%
Anastasia Solodova	A Just Russia	31,033	7.85%
Anatoly Cherednichenko	Yabloko	3,125	0.79%
Total		395,177	100%
