= Pyotr Marchenko =

Russian politician

- Пётр Марченко
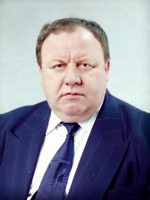

Deputy of the Duma of Stavropol Krai
- In office 4 December 2011 – 19 September 2021

2nd Governor of Stavropol Krai
- In office 20 July 1995 – 27 October 1996
- Preceded by: Yevgeny Kuznetsov
- Succeeded by: Alexander Chernogorov

Personal details
- Born: 2 January 1948 (age 78) Shpakovskoye, RSFSR, Soviet Union
- Party: United Russia

Pyotr Petrovich Marchenko (Russian: Пётр Петрович Марченко; born 2 January 1948) is a retired Russian politician. He was the deputy of the Stavropol Krai Duma, a chairman of the Stavropol Krai Duma committee on security, inter-parliamentary relations, veteran organizations and the Cossacks in 2011–2021. He is also a member of the Political Council and Presidium of the Stavropol regional branch of the United Russia party.

Marchenko served as the 2nd Governor of Stavropol Krai from 20 July 1995 to 27 October 1996. From 2005 to 2011, he worked as a Federal Inspector for Stavropol Krai of the Office of the Plenipotentiary of the President of Russia in the South and North Caucasus Federal Districts.

== Biography ==
Pyotr Marchenko was born in the village of Shpakovskoye (present dat Mikhailovsk) on 2 January 1948. He was educated at the Rostov Civil Engineering Institute in 1972, and the Stavropol Institute of Cooperation in 2002, where he worked at Shpakovsky DSK in positions from foreman to director.

From 1974 to 1989, he worked as a deputy head of the construction department in the city of Mineralnye Vody.

From 1989 to 1991, he was a Chairman of the executive committee of the Stavropol City Council of People's Deputies.

== Political career ==
=== In the administration of Stavropol Krai ===
From 1991 to 1995, Marchenko served as the Deputy, and First Deputy Head of Administration of the Stavropol Krai, serving for Yevgeny Kuznetsov.

=== Governor of Stavropol Krai (1995–1996) ===
In July 1995, Marchenko was appointed head of the administration of the Stavropol Krai. From January to October 1996, he was an ex officio member of the Federation Council, and was a member of the Federation Council Committee on International Affairs. In 1996, he was the chairman of the Social and Political Coordination Council in support of Boris Yeltsin for the 1996 Russian presidential election.

In October 1996, Marchenko ran for governor of the Stavropol Krai with the support of the Our Home - Russia and the Liberal Democratic Party of Russia parties, but was not elected.

== Plenipotentiary of the President ==
On December 30, 1996, Yeltsin appointed Marchenko as Plenipotentiary in the Republic of Adygea, the Republic of Dagestan, the Kabardino-Balkarian Republic, the Karachay-Cherkess Republic and the Stavropol Krai.

In 1997, the institution of plenipotentiary representatives of the President in the constituent entities of Russia was transformed into the institution of plenipotentiaries of the President in the regions of Russia. In the same year, Marchenko was reappointed to the post of Plenipotentiary Representative of the President of the Russian Federation in the North Caucasus.

On 15 February 1999, Marchenko was dismissed from office at his own request.

== Other careers ==
From 1999 to 2004 he worked as deputy director of the department of the joint venture "Basalt-Invest" in the Stavropol Krai and deputy general director of LLC "STAR".

From 2004 to 2005, he worked as the chief federal inspector for the Karachay-Cherkess Republic of the office of the presidential envoy in the Southern Federal District.

From 2005 to 2011, he worked as a federal and chief federal inspector for Stavropol Krai of the Presidential Plenipotentiary Envoy's Office in the South and North Caucasian Federal Districts.

== Member of the Stavropol Krai Duma ==
At the elections of deputies of the Duma of the Stavropol Krai of the fifth convocation on December 4, 2011, Marchenko was elected a deputy of the Stavropol Krai Duma from the United Russia party. At the Duma, he was elected chairman of the committee on security, inter-parliamentary relations, veteran organizations and the Cossacks. Marchenko is a member of the United Russia party.

On September 18, 2016, Marchenko was re-elected for a second term. He did not participate in 2021 election.

Marchenko also has the class rank of the state civil service - active state adviser of the Russian Federation, 3rd class.

== Public acceptance ==
In 2019, Marchenko was awarded the title of "Honorary Citizen of the Stavropol Krai".
