= Apanasenkovsky =

Apanasenkovsky (masculine), Apanasenkovskaya (feminine), or Apanasenkovskoye (neuter) may refer to:

- Apanasenkovsky District, a district of Stavropol Krai, Russia
- Apanasenkovskoye, a rural locality (a selo) in Stavropol Krai, Russia
