= Valery Gayevsky =

Russian politician

- Валерий Гаевский
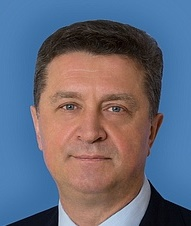

Senator from Stavropol Krai
- In office 6 October 2016 – 30 September 2021
- Succeeded by: Gennady Yagubov

Deputy Minister of Agriculture
- In office 4 March 2015 – 6 October 2016
- Minister: Nikolay Fyodorov; Alexander Tkachyov

Deputy Minister of Regional Development
- In office 13 July 2012 – 4 March 2015
- Minister: Oleg Govorun; Igor Slyunyayev

4th Governor of Stavropol Krai
- In office 16 May 2008 – 2 May 2012
- Preceded by: Alexander Chernogorov
- Succeeded by: Valery Zerenkov

Personal details
- Born: 12 November 1958 (age 67) Petrikov, Gomel Oblast, BSSR, Soviet Union
- Party: United Russia
- Education: Stavropol State University Moscow Geological Institute
- Profession: Statesman

Valery Veniaminovich Gayevsky (Russian: Валерий Вениаминович Гаевский) is a Russian politician who was the governor of Stavropol Krai in 2008-2012.

Gayevsky was born in 1958 in Petrykaw, modern Belarus. Since 1996, he worked in the government of Stavropol Krai. He held the positions of deputy chairman of the regional government, minister of finance, minister of economic development and trade.

Since 2006 - Deputy Plenipotentiary Representative of the President in the Southern Federal District. From May 2008 to May 2012 - Governor of Stavropol Krai. On 2 May 2012, Russian president Dmitry Medvedev accepted Gayevsky's resignation. Experts named his conflict with Plenipotentiary Alexander Khloponin as main purpose.

On 13 July 2012 he was appointed deputy minister of regional development of Russia. In 2014, he was in charge of dissolving of the ministry. In 2015 Gayevsky was appointed Deputy Minister of Agriculture.

From October 2016 to September 2021 - Senator of the Russian Federation - representative of the legislative branch of Stavropol Krai. Gayevsky's term was not prolonged by new convocation of the Duma of Stavropol Krai.
