= Mikhail Afanasov =

Russian politician (born 1953)

- Михаил Афанасов
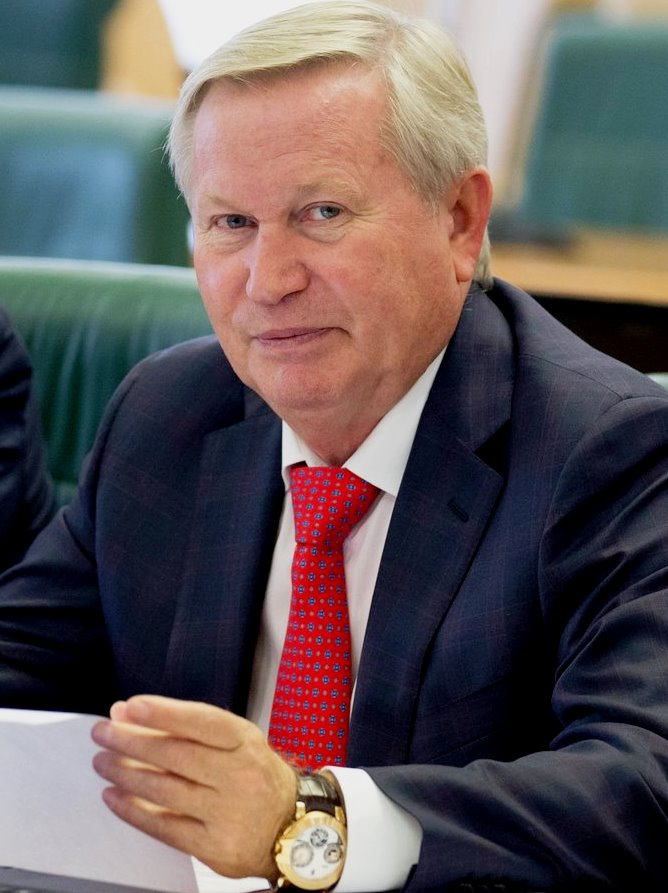
- Afanasov in 2018

Russian Federation Senator from Stavropol Krai
- Incumbent
- Assumed office 11 November 2020
- Preceded by: Sergey Melikov
- In office 17 August 2012 – 27 September 2019
- Preceded by: Yelena Sagal
- Succeeded by: Sergey Melikov

Deputy Chairman of the Government of Stavropol Krai
- In office 1 November 2019 – 11 November 2020
- Preceded by: Irina Kulvaldina
- Succeeded by: Sergey Durbovin

Member of the Duma of Stavropol Krai
- In office 12 April 2001 – 17 August 2012

Personal details
- Born: Mikhail Aleksandrovich Afanasov; 15 June 1953 (age 72) Yessentuki, Russia, Soviet Union
- Party: United Russia

Mikhail Aleksandrovich Afanasov (Russian: Михаил Александрович Афанасов; born on 15 June 1953), is a Russian politician, and economist, who is currently the Senator from Stavropol Krai on Executive Authority since 11 November 2020.

As he already served as the Senator from 2012 to 2019, he served as the Deputy Chairman of the Government of the Stavropol Krai from 2019 to 2020.

He is a PhD in economics in 2004.

== Biography ==
Mikhail Aleksandrovich Afanasov was born on 15 June 1953 in the city of Yessentuki, Stavropol Krai.

In 1979, he graduated from the Stavropol Agricultural Institute with a degree in economist-organizer of agricultural production.

He started his professional career as a car mechanic, then worked as an engineer and site manager.

In 1995, he founded the production and financial group of companies "MiG" in Yessentuki, and took the position of chairman of the board of directors in it.

In 2001, he was elected to the Duma of Stavropol Krai of the 3rd convocation, and in 2007, during the elections to the Duma of the 4th convocation, his single-mandate constituency became the only one in the region where the regional list of United Russia received more votes than the list of A Just Russia ". As a member of parliament, he served on the Committee on Budget, Taxes and Financial and Credit Policy. He was awarded with a medal and a diploma of the laureate of the V. Svyatoslav Fedorov "For noble thoughts and worthy deeds" in May 2002, and the medal "For services to the Stavropol Territory", "Tersk Cossack Cross of General Ermolov", and the honorary medal "For achievements in environmental protection.".

He received a PhD in economics in 2004, as he defended his thesis in 2004 at the Moscow Institute of Management, Economics and Finance of the State Technical University.

Afanasov's business projects include Kavminekocenter LLC, Edelweiss LLC, Cosmos Shopping and Entertainment Complex (Pyatigorsk), Interregional Construction Alliance, MBA Investment Group and others.

On 17 August 2012, he was endowed with the powers as a Senator of Stavropol Krai on the executive body of state power of the Stavropol Krai. He entered the Federation Council Committee on Constitutional Legislation and State Building.

On 27 September 2019, Afanasov was replaced by Sergey Melikov who had become the new senator, by the decree of the governor of Stavropol Krai, Vladimir Vladimirov, as Vladimirov was reelected for a second term.

On 1 November 2019, by order of the Governor of the Stavropol Territory, Vladimirov appointed Afanasov as the Deputy Prime Minister of the Government of the Stavropol Krai, as Irina Kuvaldina, on 18 October 18 was sent to court on charges of embezzling budget funds.

On 14 October 2020, he was appointed Senator again.

== Awards ==
- Medal of the Order "For Merit to the Fatherland", 2nd class (21 December 2011) — for labor achievements, many years of dedicated service, and active public activity.

=== Sanctions ===
He was sanctioned by the UK government in 2022 in relation to the Russo-Ukrainian War.
