= Yevgeny Kuznetsov (politician) =

Russian politician (1938–2005)

- Евгений Кузнецов
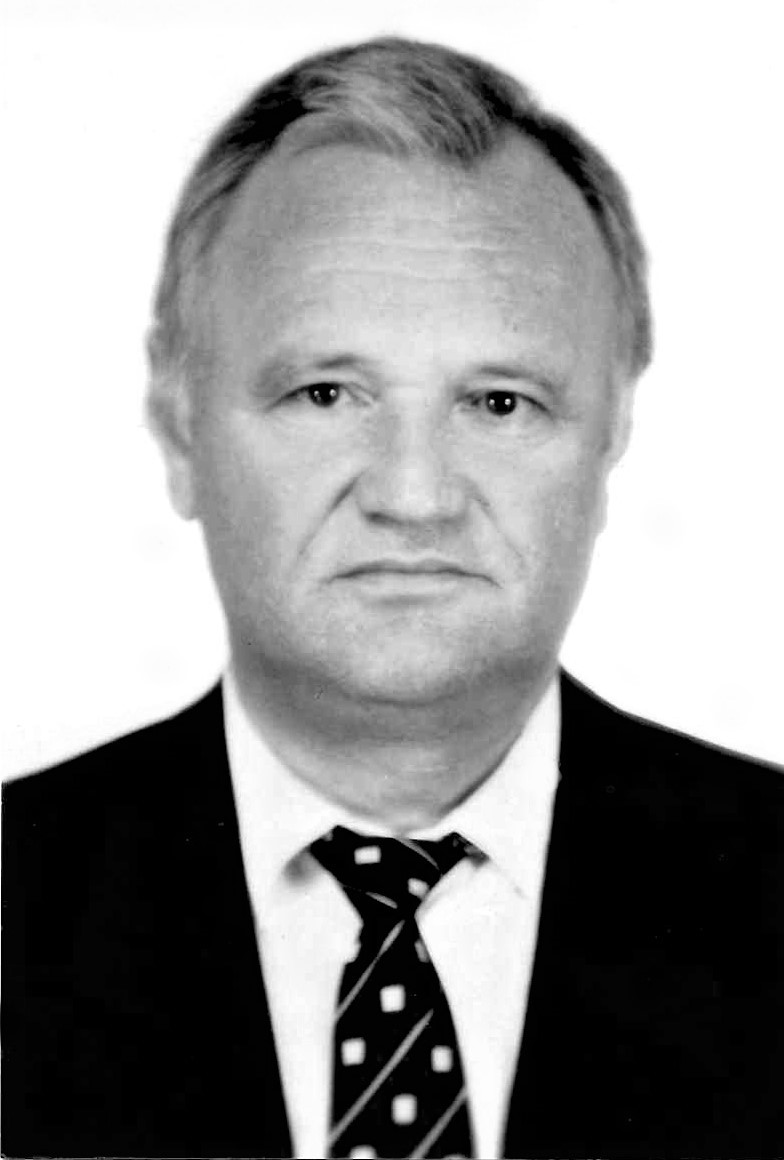

1st Governor (Head) of Stavropol Krai
- In office 24 October 1991 – 30 June 1995
- Succeeded by: Pyotr Marchenko

Personal details
- Born: Yevgeny Semyonovich Kuznetsov; 27 December 1938 Voroshilovsk, Ordzhonikidzevsky Krai, RSFSR, Soviet Union
- Died: 2 November 2005 (aged 66) Stavropol, Russia

Yevgeny Semyonovich Kuznetsov (Russian: Евгений Семёнович Кузнецов; 27 December 1938 – 2 November 2005) was a Soviet and Russian political activist.

== Political activity ==
Yevgeny Kuznetsov graduated from Stavropol State Agrarian University and started work in October 1960 as an engineer in the Caucasus refrigeration plants. From 1963–1967, he worked on the fishing trawler Pechenga, and lived in the city of Nakhodka. Later, he returned to Stavropol and worked in the office of semiconductor technologies. In 1969, he joined the Elektroautomatyka firm, where, from 1983 to December 1989, he held the position of Director-General in research and production.

Near the beginning of 1990, Kuznetsov was elected secretary of the Soviet Communist Party in the Oktiabrskim region, and in April of the same year, became a deputy to the Supreme Soviet of the USSR, followed by chairman to the city of Stavropol. From October 24, 1991, to June 30, 1995, he was governor of Stavropol Krai (he was replaced by Pyotr Marchenko).

On December 12, 1993, Kuznetsov was elected deputy of the Federation Council, where he worked in the Committee on Agrarian Policy. His resignation from the post of governor of Stavropol Krai was met with criticism from local authorities during a terrorist attack in Budyonnovsk. From 1995–2001, he worked as Russian trade representative in Argentina and Paraguay. In 2002, he became an adviser to the chairman of the Stavropol City Council.

== Death ==
He died when hit by a car in the center of Stavropol. He was married at the time. Kuznetsov was buried with honors at the cemetery in Stavropol on November 4. His funeral congregation included local self-government activists and representatives of the Russian central government.
