= Khlebny =

Khlebny (Russian: Хлебный; masculine), Khlebnaya (Хлебная; feminine), or Khlebnoye (Хлебное; neuter) is the name of several rural localities in Russia:

- Khlebny, Rostov Oblast, a settlement in Gigantovskoye Rural Settlement of Salsky District of Rostov Oblast
- Khlebny, Saratov Oblast, a railway crossing loop in Krasnokutsky District of Saratov Oblast
- Khlebny, Stavropol Krai, a settlement in Aygursky Selsoviet of Apanasenkovsky District of Stavropol Krai
- Khlebnoye, a selo in Khlebenskoye Rural Settlement of Novousmansky District of Voronezh Oblast
