= Nikolay Velikdan =

Russian politician (1956–2026)

- Николай Великдань

Chairman of the Duma of Stavropol Krai
- In office 30 September 2021 – 25 September 2026
- Preceded by: Gennady Yagubov
- Succeeded by: Lyubov Makovskaya

Member of the Duma of Stavropol Krai
- In office 30 September 2021 – 25 September 2026

Personal details
- Born: 6 March 1956 Sovetskoye Runo, Ipatovsky District, Stavropol Krai, Russian SFSR, USSR
- Died: 25 September 2026 (aged 70)
- Party: United Russia
- Education: Stavropol State Agrarian University
- Profession: Politician

Nikolay Timofeyevich Velikdan (Russian: Николай Тимофеевич Великдань; 6 March 1956 – 25 September 2026) was a Russian politician who was a member and a chairman of the Duma of Stavropol Krai from 30 September 2021 until his death.

Velikdan died on 25 September 2026, at the age of 70.
