= Gennady Yagubov =

Russian politician (born 1968)

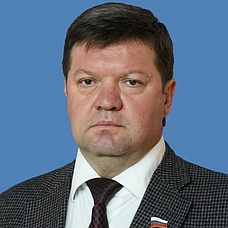

Senator Federation Council Russia from Stavropol Krai
- Incumbent
- Assumed office 30 September 2021
- Preceded by: Valery Gayevsky

Chairman of the Stavropol Regonal Duma
- In office 29 September 2016 – 30 September 2021
- Preceded by: Yuri Bely
- Succeeded by: Nikolai Velikdan

Deputy Krai Stavropol Krai Duma
- In office 12 March 2009 – 30 September 2021

Personal details
- Born: Gennady Yagubov; 1 October 1968 (age 58) Budyonnovsk, Stavropol Krai, Soviet Union
- Party: United Russia
- Education: Stavropol State Agrarian University, North-Caucasus Federal University

Gennady Vladimirovich Yagubov (Russian: Геннадий Владимирович Ягубов; born 17 April 1968) is a Russian politician serving as a Senator Federation Council Russia from Stavropol Krai since 30 September 2021.

== Biography ==
Gennady Yagubov was born on 6 June 1957 in Budyonnovsk, Stavropol Krai.

In 1992, he graduated from the Stavropol State Agrarian University.

From 1968 to 1988, he served in the Soviet Army. Afterwards, he worked as an engineer and later as a director of the municipal enterprise of Budennovsk «Combine improvement».

From 2010 to 2021, he was the deputy of Duma of Stavropol Krai.

In 2021, he became the senator Federation Council Russia from the Duma of Stavropol Krai.
