= Novoalexandrovsk =

Novoalexandrovsk Новоалександровск
- Town
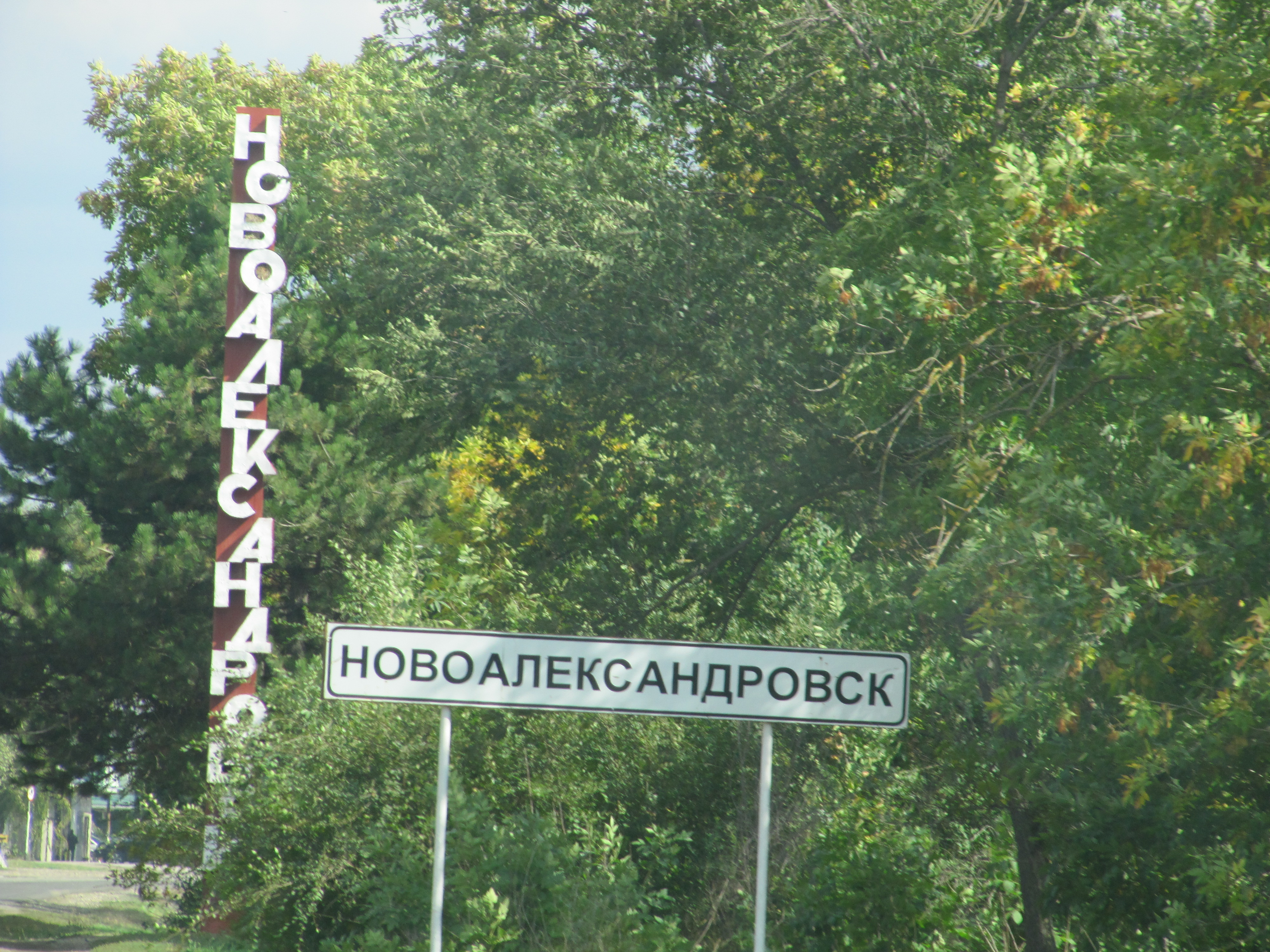
- Welcome sign at the entrance to Novoalexandrovsk

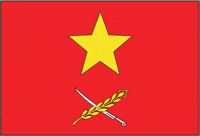
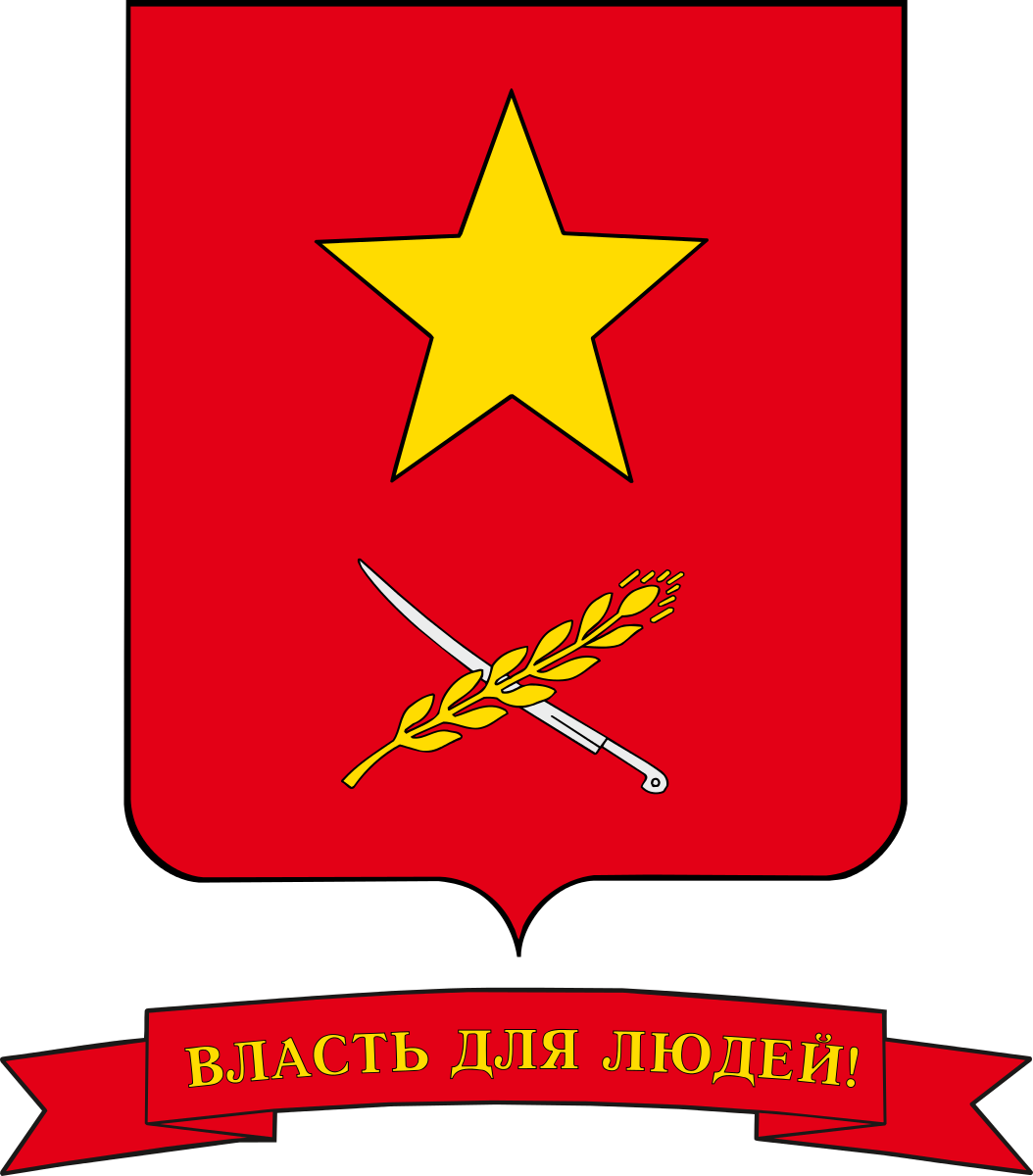
- Flag Coat of arms
- Interactive map of Novoalexandrovsk
- Location of Novoalexandrovsk Novoalexandrovsk (Stavropol Krai)
- Coordinates: 45°30′N 41°14′E
- Country: Russia
- Federal subject: Stavropol Krai
- Administrative district: Novoalexandrovsky District
- TownSelsoviet: Novoalexandrovsk
- Founded: 1804
- Town status since: 1971

Area
  - Total: 21 km^{2} (8.1 sq mi)
- Elevation: 110 m (360 ft)

Population (2010 Census)
  - Total: 26,757
  - Estimate (2025): 25,718 (−3.9%)
  - Density: 1,300/km^{2} (3,300/sq mi)

Administrative status
  - Capital of: Novoalexandrovsky District, Town of Novoalexandrovsk

Municipal status
  - Municipal district: Novoalexandrovsky Municipal District
  - Urban settlement: Novoalexandrovsk Urban Settlement
  - Capital of: Novoalexandrovsky Municipal District, Novoalexandrovsk Urban Settlement
- Time zone: UTC+3 (MSK)
- Postal code: 356000–356003
- Dialing code: +7 86544
- OKTMO ID: 07643101001
- Website: novoalex.ru

Novoalexandrovsk (Russian: Новоалекса́ндровск) is a town and the administrative center of Novoalexandrovsky District in Stavropol Krai, Russia, located on the bank of the Rasshevatka River, 110 kilometers (68 mi) northwest of Stavropol, the administrative center of the krai. Population: 26,518 (2020), 26,757 (2010 census); 27,315 (2002 census); 25,759 (1989 Soviet census).

== History ==
It was founded in 1804 by settlers from Central Russia as the village of Novo-Alexandrovskoye (Но́во-Алекса́ндровское). In 1832, it was transformed into the Cossack stanitsa of Novoalexandrovskaya (Новоалекса́ндровская). It was granted town status and renamed Novoalexandrovsk in 1971.

== Administrative and municipal status ==
Within the framework of administrative divisions, Novoalexandrovsk serves as the administrative center of Novoalexandrovsky District. As an administrative division, it is, together with the khutor of Verny, incorporated within Novoalexandrovsky District as the Town of Novoalexandrovsk. As a municipal division, the Town of Novoalexandrovsk is incorporated within Novoalexandrovsky Municipal District as Novoalexandrovsk Urban Settlement.
