= Alexander Chernogorov =

Russian politician

- Александр Черногоров
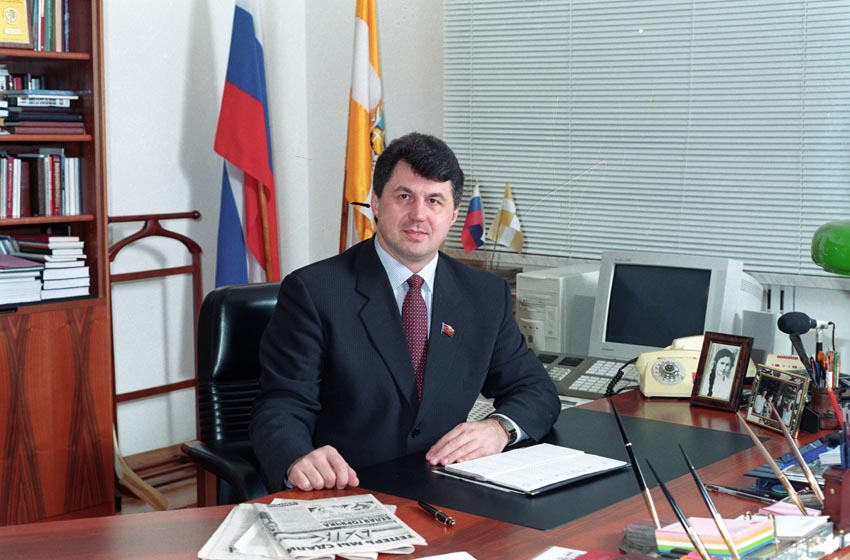
- Chernogorov in 2005

3rd Governor of Stavropol Krai
- In office 28 November 1996 – 16 May 2008
- Preceded by: Pyotr Marchenko
- Succeeded by: Valery Gayevsky

Member of the State Duma
- In office 17 December 1995 – 28 November 1996

Personal details
- Born: July 13, 1959 (age 67) Vozdvizhenskoye, Stavropol Krai, Apanasenkovsky District, Stavropol Krai, RSFSR, Soviet Union
- Party: CPRF (1993–2006)
- Other political affiliations: LDPR (2016), United Russia (2006–07), CPSU (1983–91)
- Education: Kuban State Agrarian University

Alexander Leonidovich Chernogorov (Russian: Александр Леонидович Черногоров; born 13 July 1959) is a Russian politician. The first popularly elected Governor of Stavropol Krai (1996—2008). Honorary member of the Russian Youth Union (1998).

Chernogorov was born in Vozdvizhenskoye, Stavropol Krai. From 1982 to 1990 he was a Komsomol functionary. In 1995 Chernogorov was elected member of the State Duma.

As candidate for the Communists he defeated his predecessor Pyotr Marchenko in 1996, and was re-elected governor in 2000. He holds the military rank of captain. Chernogorov has decried Jehovah's Witnesses (calling them "Jehovists", the Soviet derogatory term for the religion) and Wahhabism as "dangerous cults" that threaten state order. Stavropol Krai is not far from Chechnya.

In late 2005, news media in Russia were reporting that Chernogorov may not continue as governor after his current term. Chernogorov resigned in May 2008, moving to the Ministry of Agriculture as deputy minister. He left this post in 2013.
