= Divnoye, Baltiysky District, Kaliningrad Oblast =

Rural locality in Baltiysky District, Kaliningrad Oblast, Russia

Coordinates: 54°45′22″N 20°0′48″E

Divnoye (Russian: Ди́вное) is a rural locality (a selo) in Baltiysky District in Kaliningrad Oblast, Russia. Population: 639 (2010 census); 594 (2002 census);
