= Governor of Stavropol Krai =

Highest-ranking official in Stavropol Krai, Russia

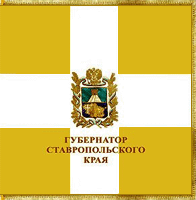
- Standard of Governor of Stavropol Krai

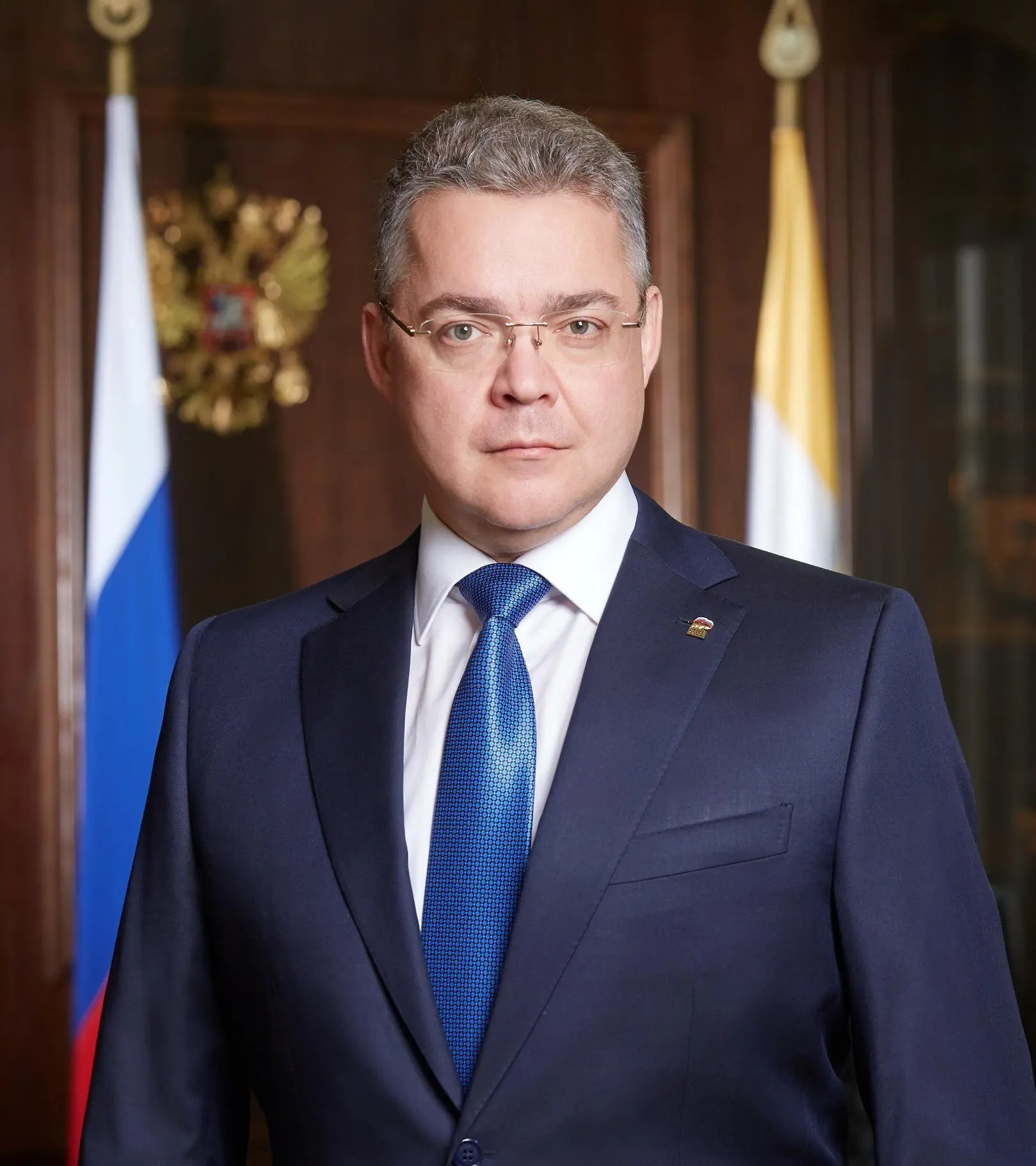
- Incumbent; Vladimir Vladimirov since 27 September 2014
- Seat: Stavropol
- Term length: 5 years
- Formation: 1991
- Website: gubernator.stavkray.ru

The Governor of Stavropol Krai (Russian: Губернатор Ставропольского края) is the head of government of Stavropol Krai, a federal subject of Russia.

The position was introduced in 1991 as Head of Administration of Stavropol Krai. The Governor is elected by direct popular vote for a term of five years.

== List of officeholders ==
#	Portrait	Governor	Tenure	Time in office	Party	Election
1		Yevgeny Kuznetsov (1938–2005)	24 October 1991 – 30 June 1995 (removed)	3 years, 249 days	Independent	Appointed
2		Pyotr Marchenko (born 1948)	20 July 1995 – 28 November 1996 (lost election)	1 year, 131 days	Independent	Appointed
3		Alexander Chernogorov (born 1959)	28 November 1996 – 16 May 2008 (resigned)	11 years, 170 days	Communist	1996; 2000; 2005
3		Alexander Chernogorov (born 1959)	28 November 1996 – 16 May 2008 (resigned)	11 years, 170 days	United Russia	1996; 2000; 2005
3		Alexander Chernogorov (born 1959)	28 November 1996 – 16 May 2008 (resigned)	11 years, 170 days	Independent	1996; 2000; 2005
—		Valery Gayevsky (born 1958)	16 May 2008 – 23 May 2008	3 years, 352 days	United Russia	Acting
4		Valery Gayevsky (born 1958)	23 May 2008 – 2 May 2012 (resigned)	3 years, 352 days	United Russia	2008
—		Valery Zerenkov (born 1948)	2 May 2012 – 5 May 2012	1 year, 148 days	United Russia	Acting
5		Valery Zerenkov (born 1948)	5 May 2012 – 27 September 2013 (resigned)	1 year, 148 days	United Russia	2012
—		Vladimir Vladimirov (born 1975)	27 September 2013 – 27 September 2014	12 years, 345 days	United Russia	Acting
6		Vladimir Vladimirov (born 1975)	27 September 2014 – present	12 years, 345 days	United Russia	2014; 2019; 2024
