= Divnoye, Stavropol Krai =

Rural locality in Stavropol Krai, Russia

Coordinates: 45°54′26″N 43°21′21″E

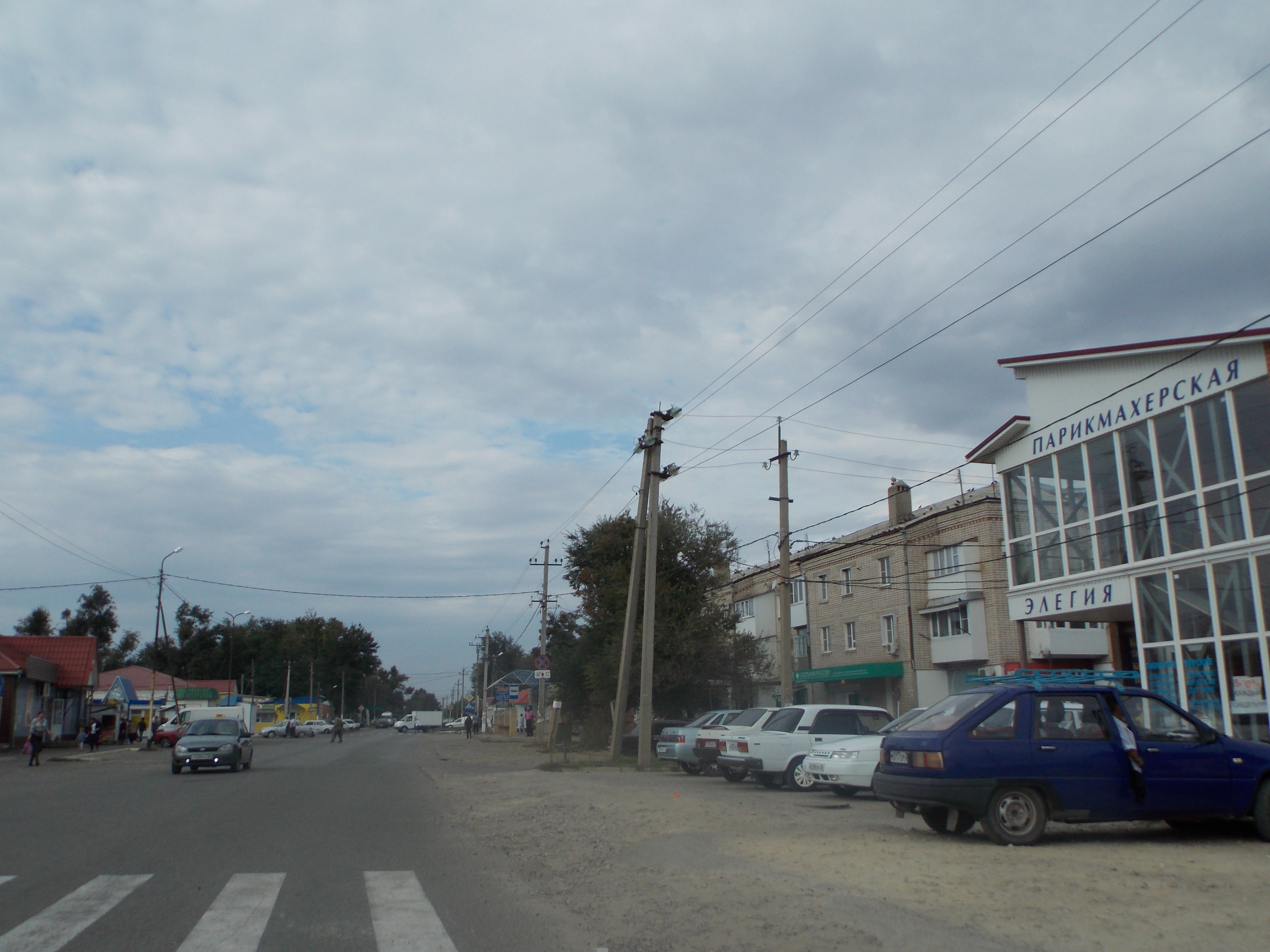
Street of Divnoe, Stavropol Territory

Divnoye (Russian: Дивное) is a rural locality (a selo) and the administrative center of Apanasenkovsky District, Stavropol Krai, Russia. Population: 14,085 (2010 census); 15,423 (2002 census); 14,526 (1989 Soviet census).
