= Novoalexandrovsky District =

Novoalexandrovsky District Новоалександровский район (Russian)
- District
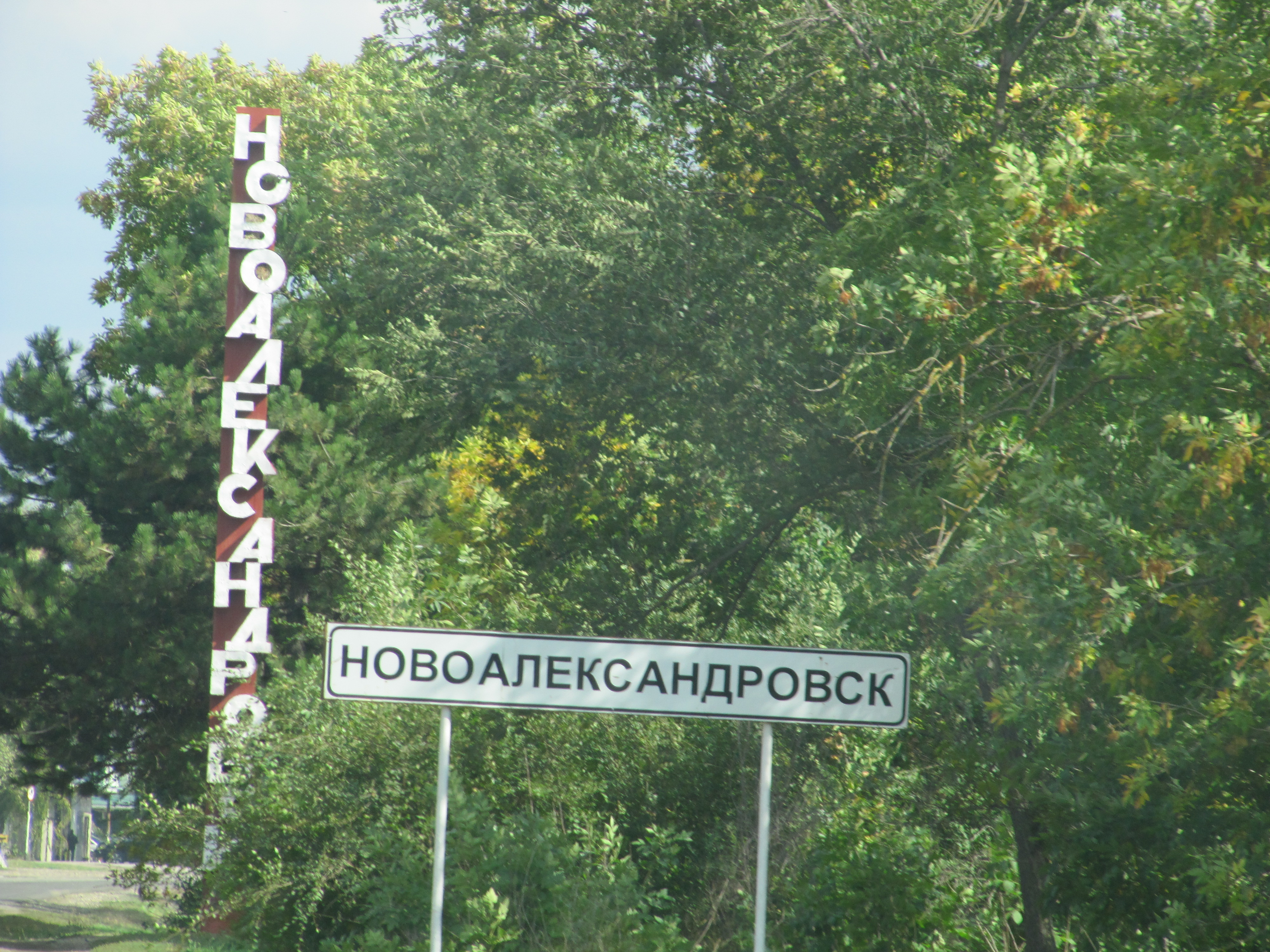
- Welcome sign at the entrance to the town of Novoalexandrovsk, the administrative center of Novoalexandrovsky District

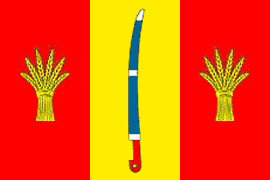
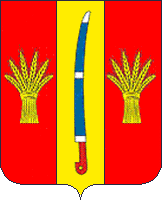
- Flag Coat of arms
- Location of Novoalexandrovsky District in Stavropol Krai
- Coordinates: 45°30′N 41°13′E
- Country: Russia
- Federal subject: Stavropol Krai
- Established: 1924
- Administrative center: Novoalexandrovsk

Area
  - Total: 2,015 km^{2} (778 sq mi)

Population (2010 Census)
  - Total: 65,477
  - Density: 32.49/km^{2} (84.16/sq mi)
  - Urban: 40.9%
  - Rural: 59.1%

Administrative structure
  - Administrative divisions: 1 Towns, 9 Selsoviets
  - Inhabited localities: 1 cities/towns, 40 rural localities

Municipal structure
  - Municipally incorporated as: Novoalexandrovsky Municipal District
  - Municipal divisions: 1 urban settlements, 11 rural settlements
- Time zone: UTC+3 (MSK)
- OKTMO ID: 07726000
- Website: http://www.newalexandrovsk.ru

Novoalexandrovsky District (Russian: Новоалекса́ндровский райо́н) is an administrative district (raion), one of the twenty-six in Stavropol Krai, Russia. Municipally, it is incorporated as Novoalexandrovsky Municipal District. It is located in the west of the krai. The area of the district is 2,015 square kilometers (778 sq mi). Its administrative center is the town of Novoalexandrovsk. Population: 65,477 (2010 census); 67,065 (2002 Census); 58,630 (1989 Census). The population of Novoalexandrovsk accounts for 40.9% of the district's total population.
