= Vladimir Vladimirov (politician) =

Russian governor

- Владимир Владимиров
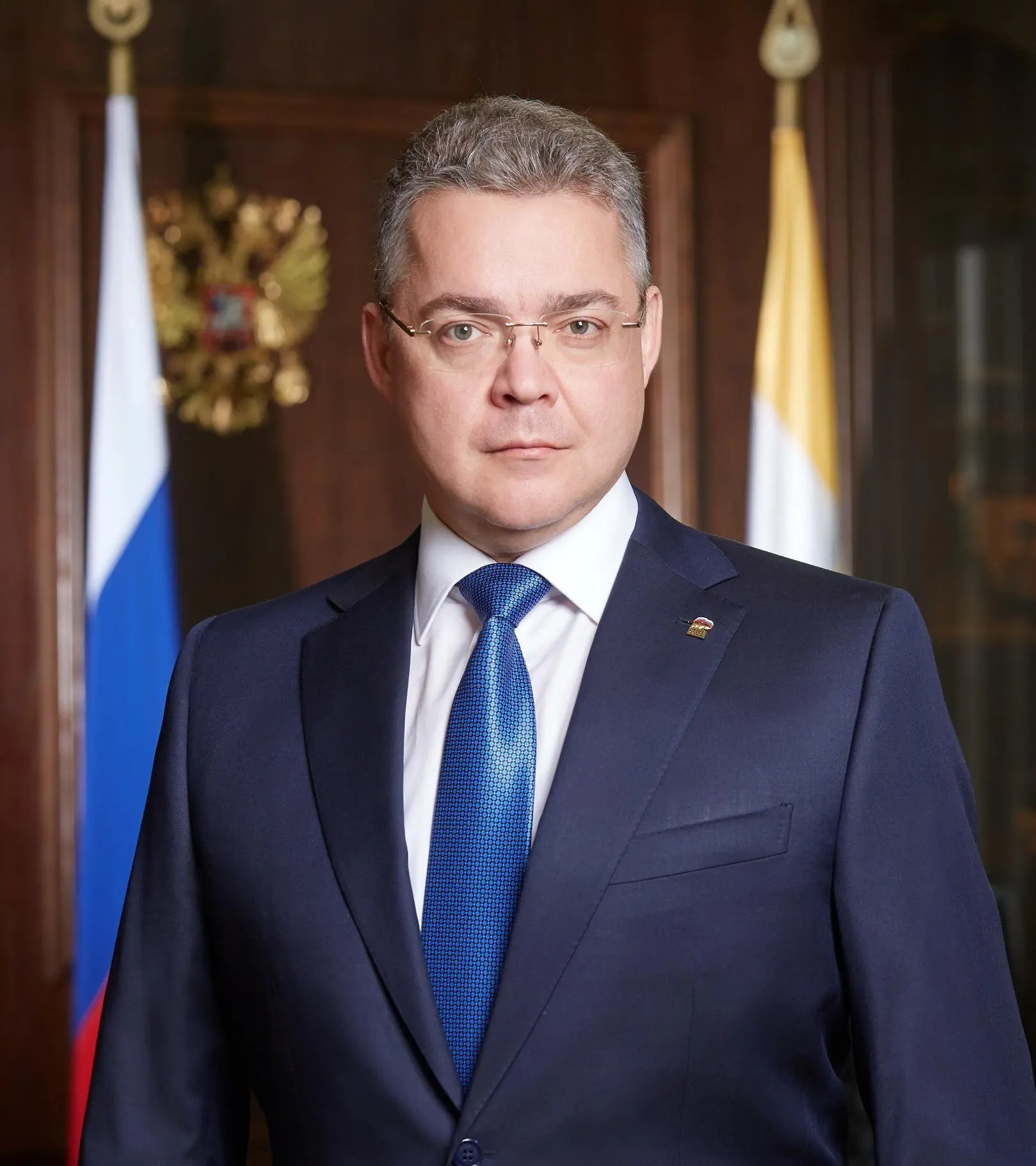

Governor of Stavropol Krai
- Incumbent
- Assumed office 27 September 2014
- President: Vladimir Putin
- Preceded by: Valery Zerenkov

First Deputy Governor of the Yamal-Nenets Autonomous Okrug
- In office 21 April 2010 – 27 September 2013
- Governor of the region: Dmitry Kobylkin
- Succeeded by: Aleksey Sitnikov

Deputy of the Legislative Assembly of the Yamal-Nenets Autonomous Okrug
- In office 14 March – 21 April 2010

Personal details
- Born: 14 October 1975 year Georgiyevsk, Stavropol Krai, Russian SFSR, Soviet Union
- Party: United Russia
- Education: Ufa State Petroleum Technological University; Industrial University of Tyumen
- Profession: cook; engineer; politician

Vladimir Vladimirovich Vladimirov (Russian: Владимир Владимирович Владимиров; born 14 October 1975) is a Russian politician who has served as Governor of Stavropol Krai since 2014.

== Biography ==
Vladimir Vladimirov was born in city Georgievsk Stavropol kray, on 14 October 1975.

Then his parents were sent to Kamchatka, and later Vladimir returned with his mother to the Stavropol kray, to the city of Budennovsk.

His maternal grandmother is a cook in the dining room, and grandfather worked in various professions.

His ancestors are Terek Cossacks.

=== Education ===
In 1992, he started secondary school in the city of Budennovsk. There is a training and production plant specializing in "3-grade cook-culinary specialist".

In 1997, at the Ufa State Petroleum Technical University, he earned a degree in Chemical Technology of Natural Energy Carriers and Carbon Materials.

In 2006, at the Tyumen State Oil and Gas University, he earned a degree in Development and Operation of Oil and Gas Fields.

Vladimirov by education is a 3rd class Cook and engineer.

=== Labor activity ===
In 1990–1996 he was appointed to the position of a worker at the «Stavrolen» plant in the Stavropol territory. He quit in 1996 due to the closure of the plant.

Later he worked salesman, a loader, and renovated apartments.

Since 1997, he was head of the oil treatment and pumping unit at the Vatyeganneft oil and gas production department of the Kogalymneftegaz enterprise, which is part of LUKOIL-Western Siberia LLC in the Khanty-Mansi Autonomous Okrug.

He worked at the Kogalymneftegaz production facilities until 2005.

From 2001 to 2002, he was head of the oil preparation and pumping department at Druzhbaneft NGDU.

In 2002, he was Deputy Chief Engineer for Oil Treatment and Pumping - Head of Oil Treatment Department at NGDU Povkhneft.

From 2002 to 2005, he was deputy head of the oil treatment department, deputy chief engineer for oil treatment - head of a department at the Kogalymneftegaz enterprise.

From 2005 to 2007, he was Director of Marketing and Strategy, then General Director of Geoilbent LLC.

From 2007 to 2009 he was Director of the Technical Department, then was promoted to Deputy General Director - Chief Engineer of OJSC Verkhnechonskneftegaz.

From 2009 to 2010, he held executive positions at the Muravlenkovskneft Branch of OJSC Gazpromneft-Noyabrskneftegaz.

In March 2010, Vladirmirov was elected deputy to the Legislative Assembly of the Yamalo-Nenets Autonomous Okrug.

In April 2010, the Governor of the Yamal-Nenets Autonomous Okrug, Dmitry Kobylkin, appointed Vladimirov to the post of the first deputy governor of the Yamal-Nenets Autonomous Okrug.

Its scope included issues of economic development, the use of natural resources, the work of the fuel and energy complex.

In 2010 he joined the United Russia party.

=== Governor of Stravropol Krai ===
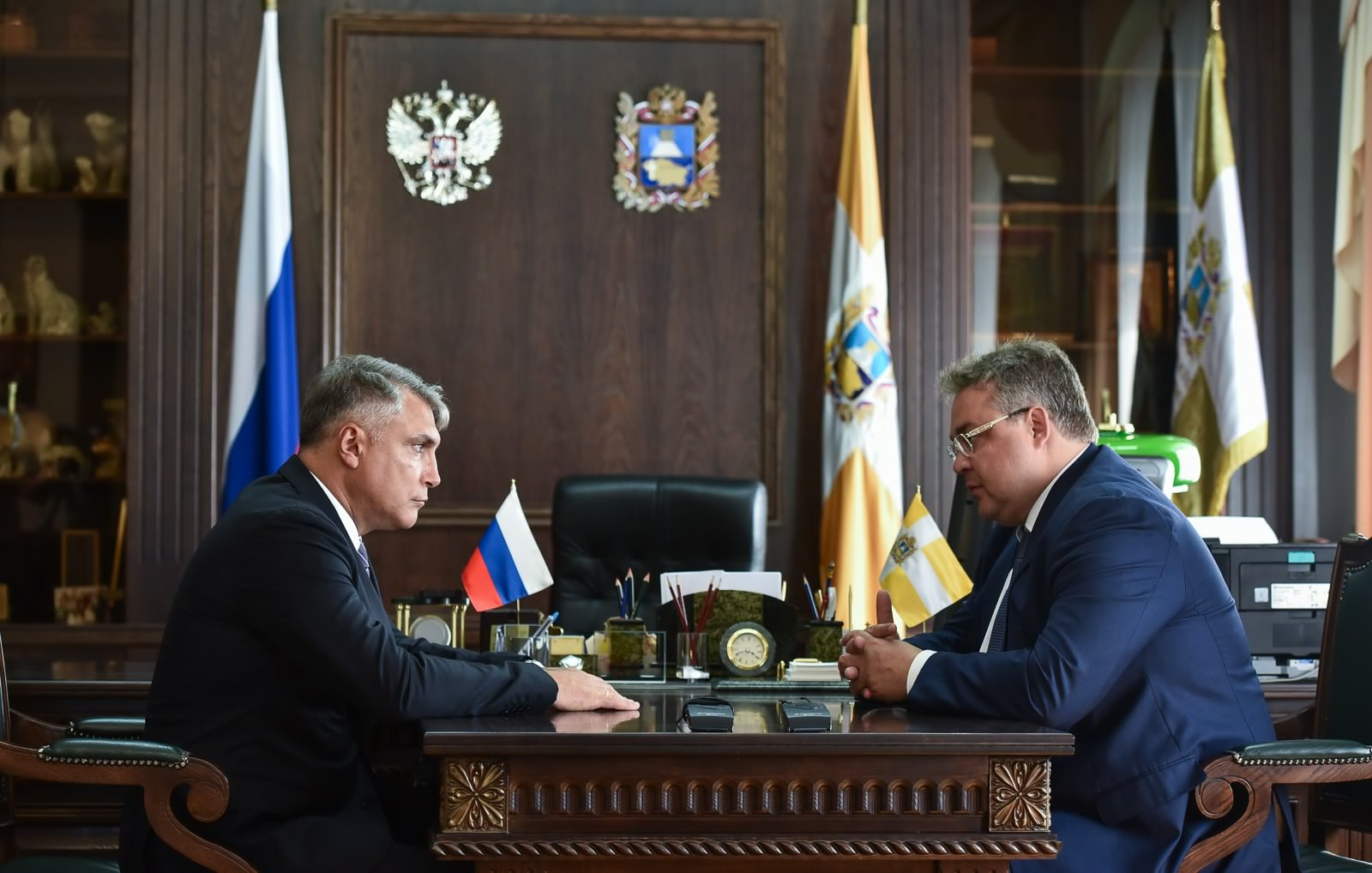
Vladimirov at a meeting with the Plenipotentiary of the President of Russia, 2018

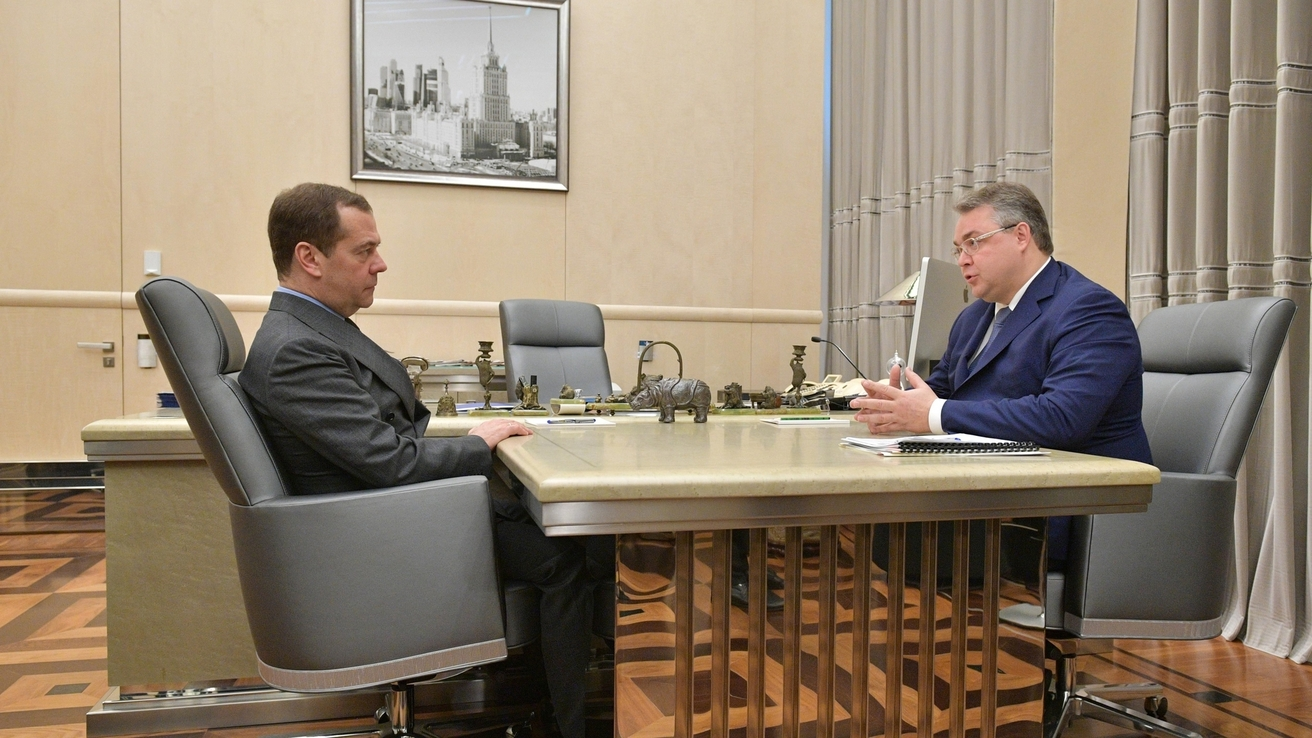
Governor at a meeting with Russian Prime Minister Dmitry Medvedev

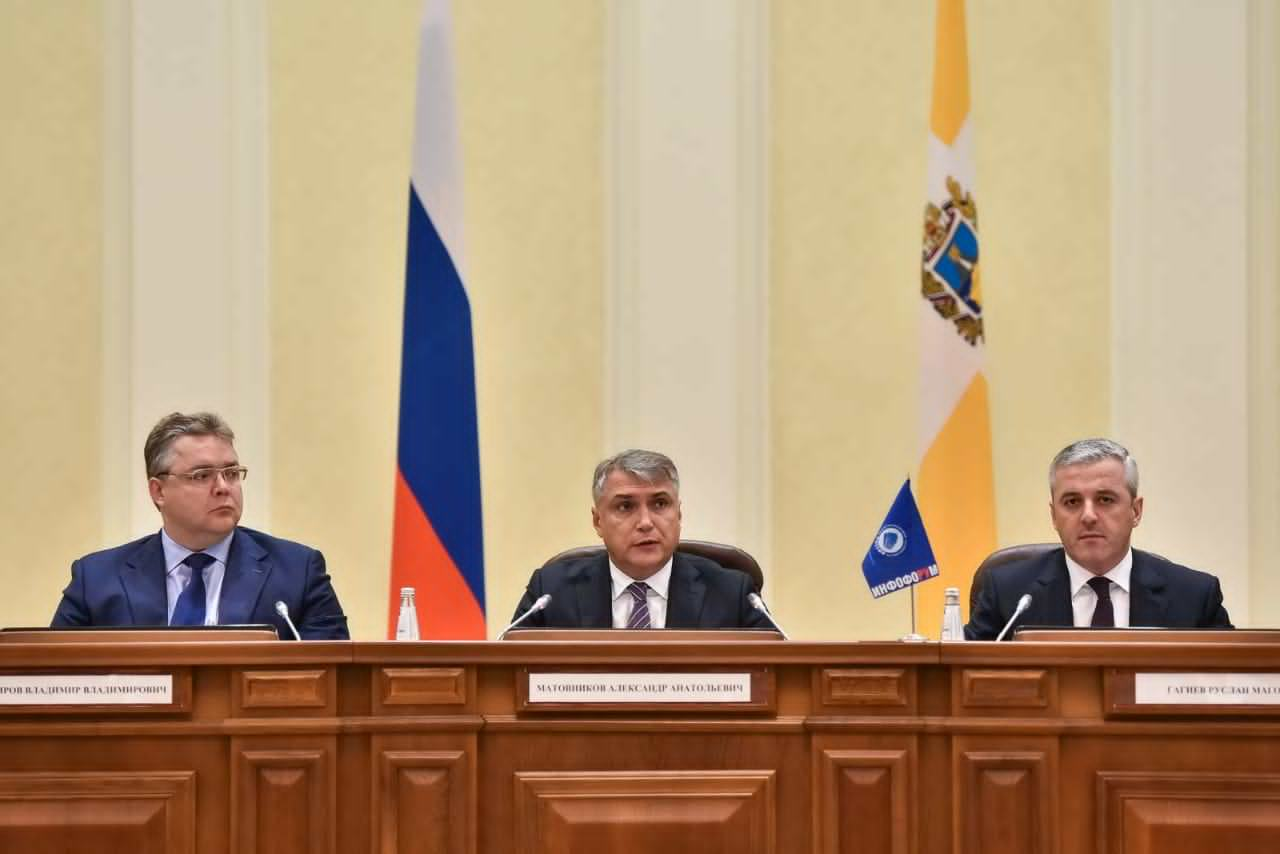
Vladimirov at the meeting

On 27 September 2013, Vladimirov was appointed acting governor of the Stavropol Krai, replacing Valery Zerenkov.

On a single voting day on 14 September 2014, he was elected governor of the Stavropol Krai for five years, on 27 September 2014, the inauguration took place in the city of Stavropol.

In October 2013, he headed the regional government of Stavropol Krai.

In May 2017, he supervised the liquidation of a powerful flood that covered 13 districts of the Stavropol Krai.

From 7 April to 10 November 2015 and from 28 January to 2 August 2019 he was a Member of the Presidium of the State Council of the Russian Federation.

According to a study by VTsIOM, Vladimir Vladimirov's rating as of April 2019 is 46%, and his electoral potential is 65%.

Vladimirov was nominated by the Stavropol regional branch of the United Russia party for new elections, which took place on a single voting day on 8 September 2019.

On 19 July 2019, Vladimirov was registered as a candidate for the post of governor of the Stavropol Krai.

On 8 September 2019, on a single voting day, Vladimirov was reelected as the Governor of the Stavropol Krai for the next five years. He was supported by 79.65% of the residents of the Stavropol Krai. He took office again on 27 September 2019.

On 1 November 2019, at a conference of the Stavropol regional branch of the United Russia party, he was elected secretary of the regional branch of the party,

On 16 March 2020, Vladimirov headed the regional coordination council for countering COVID-19. Using his social networks, the head of the region daily tells the residents of the region the latest operational information.

He was elected to a third term in September 2024.

=== Sanctions ===
He was sanctioned by the UK government in 2022 in relation to the Russo-Ukrainian War.

== Family ==
Vladimirov has three sons, Vladimir Jr., Nikolay and Ivan. His daughter Maria is the youngest. His wife Natalya is from Irkutsk, she is 7 years younger, and is in charge of the public project "Time of Stavropol".
