= Stavropol State Agrarian University =

Agricultural university in Stavropol, Russia

Coordinates: 45.0376°N 41.9610°E

- Ставропольский государственный аграрный университет
- Type: Agricultural
- Established: 1930
- Rector: Sitnikov Vladimir Nikolaevich
- Location: Stavropol, Russia
- Website: www.stgau.ru

Stavropol State Agrarian University, abbr. SSAU, is a state institution of higher education in Stavropol, Northern Caucasus. The previous title of the university is Stavropol State Agricultural Academy.

== History ==
1930 – as a result of Moscow Zootechnic Institute's reorganization four education institutions were established: Moscow Zootechnic Institute of horse breeding based on the Horse Breeding Faculty, Moscow Cattle Institute, Moscow Sheep-breeding Institute and Moscow Veterinarian Institute.

1933 – Krasnodar Sheep-breeding Institute and Taganrog Institute Department of dairy&meat cattle breeding joined the institute. It was renamed as Northern Caucasian Zootechnic Institute.

1940 - All-Soviet Union Sheep Breeding Research Institute of People's Commissariat for Agriculture.

1970 – Institution Preparation Department was established.

1976 – the institute was awarded with Order of the Red Banner of Labour for merits of highly skilled agrarian specialists’ training, for development and implement of scientific achievements into agrarian performance.

1994 - State Higher Education Committee made a decision to transform the Institution into the Stavropol State Agricultural Academy.

2001 – the academy was renamed as Stavropol State Agrarian University.

== Executives ==
Chief officers of the Northern Caucasian Zootechnic Institute

- 1930–1934 – Viktor Viktorovitch Viktor
- 1934–1937 – Yan Yanovitch Virs
- 1937–1938 – Aleksey Ivanovitch Mikhalin

Chief officer of Voroshilov Zooveterinarian Institute

- 1938–1941 – Gerasim Khrisanfovitch Alafinov

Chief officers of the Stavropol State Agricultural Institute

- 1942–1955 – Feodosiy Vasilyevitch Kozel
- 1955–1961 – Ignatiy Prokofyevitch Salmin

Rectors of the Stavropol Agrarian Institute

- 1961–1968 – Aleksandr Ivanovitch Zhukov
- 1968–1984 – Viktor Ivanovitch Lisunov
- 1984–1999 – Viktor Yakovlevitch Nikitin

== Rector of the Stavropol State Agrarian University ==
- 1999-2019 – Vladimir Ivanovitch Trukhachev
- 2020-2021 – Ivan Vyacheslavovich Atanov
- 2021-2022 (acting) – Alexander Vladimirovich Trukhachev
- from February 16, 2022 (acting) – Skripkin Valentin Sergeevich
- October 13, 2022 - April 19, 2023 – Sitnikov Vladimir Nikolaevich
- April 2023 – present – Sitnikov Vladimir Nikolaevich

== Performance ==
According to the license the university has a right to perform an education activity including 126 programs of HPE (specialist, bachelor, master's degree program), where 18.500 students are studying. University structure consists of 9 faculties, 51 chairs, 90 innovation labs and centers, techno-park “UniverAgro”, publishing complex “AGRUS”, 32 minor innovation ventures, horse physical culture school, vivarium, research library. The number of Stavropol State Agrarian University staff is 1405 men including 698 teachers. 92,1% of teaching staff has a science-degree, and the average age of staff is 39. Stavropol State Agrarian University has 66 countries-members, 136 strategic partners, 51 branch chairs on the basis of employers. Every year 235 contracts on creative collaboration are signed. SSAU is the member of Great University Charter since 2008.

== Faculties ==
- Faculty of Agronomy
- Faculty of Veterinarian Medicine
- Faculty of Plants Protection
- Faculty of Agricultural Mechanization
- Faculty of Hospitality Business and Tourism
- Faculty of Technological Management
- Accounting and finance faculty
- Faculty of Economics
- Faculty of Electrification in Agriculture

== Notable alumni ==
- Mikhail Gorbachev - the recipient of the Nobel Peace Prize (1990), the President of the USSR (1990–1991).
