= Apanasenkovsky District =

Apanasenkovsky District Апанасенковский район (Russian)
- District
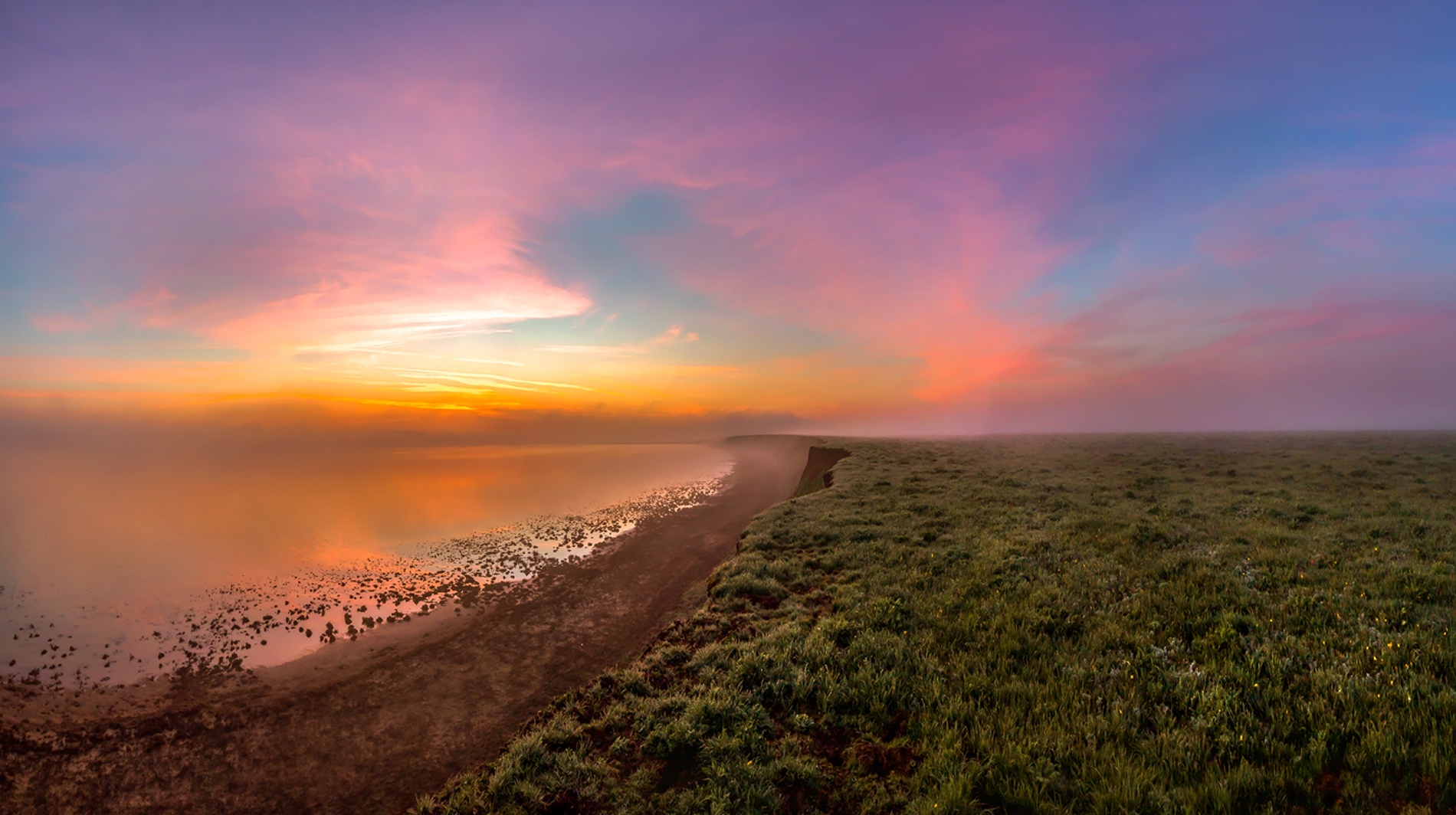
- Manych-Gudilo Reserve, in Apanasenkovsky District

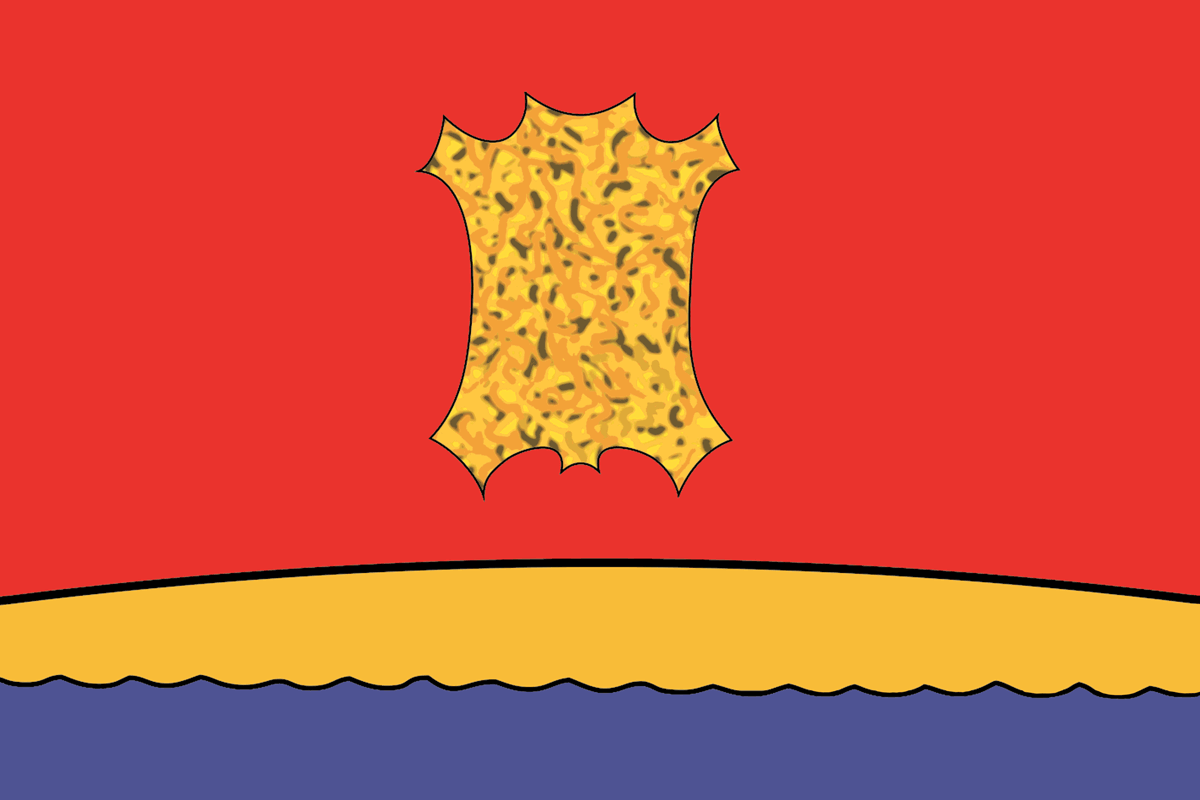
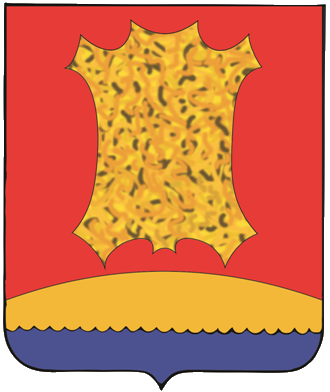
- Flag Coat of arms
- Location of Apanasenkovsky District in Stavropol Krai
- Coordinates: 45°55′N 43°21′E
- Country: Russia
- Federal subject: Stavropol Krai
- Established: 1924
- Administrative center: Divnoye

Area
  - Total: 3,584 km^{2} (1,384 sq mi)

Population (2010 Census)
  - Total: 33,074
  - Density: 9.228/km^{2} (23.90/sq mi)
  - Urban: 0%
  - Rural: 100%

Administrative structure
  - Administrative divisions: 2 selsoviet
  - Inhabited localities: 14 rural localities

Municipal structure
  - Municipally incorporated as: Apanasenkovsky Municipal District
  - Municipal divisions: 0 urban settlements, 11 rural settlements
- Time zone: UTC+3 (MSK)
- OKTMO ID: 07605000
- Website: http://www.div.stv.ru/aamr/

Apanasenkovsky District (Russian: Апанасенко́вский райо́н) is an administrative district (raion), one of the twenty-six in Stavropol Krai, Russia. Municipally, it is incorporated as Apanasenkovsky Municipal District. It is located in the north of the krai. The area of the district is 3,584 square kilometers (1,384 sq mi). Its administrative center is the rural locality (a selo) of Divnoye. Population: 33,074 (2010 census); 36,038 (2002 Census); 35,682 (1989 Census). The population of Divnoye accounts for 42.6% of the district's total population.
