= Duma of Stavropol Krai =

Regional parliament of Stavropol Krai, Russia

Duma of Stavropol Krai Дума Ставропольского края
- 7th legislature

Type
- Type: Unicameral

Leadership
- Chairman: Nikolay Velikdan, United Russia since 30 September 2021

Structure
- Seats: 50
- Political groups: United Russia (43) CPRF (4); SRZP (2) Independent (1)

Elections
- Voting system: Mixed
- Last election: 19 September 2021
- Next election: 2026

Meeting place
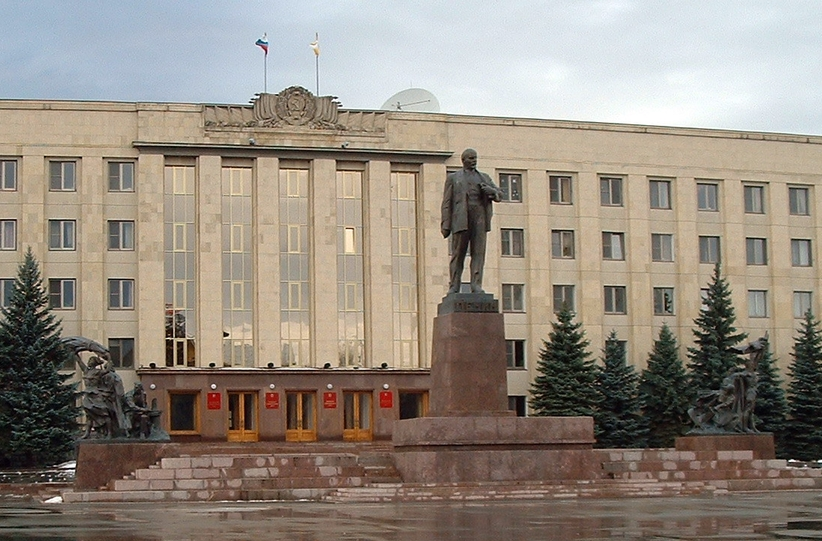
- 1 Lenin Square, Stavropol

Website
- dumask.ru

The Duma of Stavropol Krai (Russian: Дума Ставропольского края), formerly the State Duma of Stavropol Krai until 2010, (Note: Russian: Государственная дума Ставропольского края) is the regional parliament of Stavropol Krai, a federal subject of Russia. It consists of 50 deputies elected for five-year terms.

== Elections ==
=== 2021 ===
Party	%	Seats
United Russia	60.34	43
Communist Party of the Russian Federation	15.71	4
A Just Russia — For Truth	9.46	2
Self-nominated	—	1
Liberal Democratic Party of Russia	4.94	0
New People	3.20	0
Russian Party of Pensioners for Social Justice	2.45	0
Communists of Russia	1.76	0
Registered voters/turnout	66.74	
