= List of rural localities in Stavropol Krai =

Map of Russia with Stavropol Krai highlighted

This is a list of rural localities in Stavropol Krai. Stavropol Krai (Russian: Ставропо́льский край, romanized: Stavropolsky kray, IPA: [stəvrɐˈpolʲskʲɪj kraj]) is a federal subject (a krai) of Russia. It is geographically located in the North Caucasus region in Southern Russia, and is administratively part of the North Caucasian Federal District. Stavropol Krai has a population of 2,786,281 (2010).

== Locations ==
- Abdul-Gazy
- Abram-Tyube
- Alexandrovskoye
- Arzgir
- Bezopasnoye
- Chur
- Divnoye
- Donskoye
- Etoka
- Grachyovka
- Grigoropolisskaya
- Kochubeyevskoye
- Krasnogvardeyskoye
- Kursavka
- Kurskaya
- Letnyaya Stavka
- Levokumskoye
- Lysogorskaya
- Nezlobnaya
- Novoselitskoye
- Orbelyanovka
- Privolnoye
- Soluno-Dmitriyevskoye
- Stepnoye
- Trunovskoye
- Yessentukskaya
- Yutsa

== See also ==
- Lists of rural localities in Russia
