= Donskoy (inhabited locality) =

Donskoy (Russian: Донской; masculine), Donskaya (Донская; feminine), or Donskoye (Донское; neuter) is the name of several inhabited localities in Russia.

Urban localities

- Donskoy, Tula Oblast, a town in Tula Oblast
- Donskoye, Svetlogorsky District, Kaliningrad Oblast, an urban-type settlement in Svetlogorsky District of Kaliningrad Oblast

Rural localities

- Donskoy, Kaluga Oblast, a settlement in Khvastovichsky District of Kaluga Oblast
- Donskoy, Kemerovo Oblast, a settlement in Kitatskaya Rural Territory of Yashkinsky District of Kemerovo Oblast
- Donskoy, Krasnodar Krai, a settlement in Mayaksky Rural Okrug of Otradnensky District of Krasnodar Krai
- Donskoy, Lipetsk Oblast, a settlement in Yablonovsky Selsoviet of Krasninsky District of Lipetsk Oblast
- Donskoy, Orenburg Oblast, a settlement in Troitsky Selsoviet of Asekeyevsky District of Orenburg Oblast
- Donskoy, Azovsky District, Rostov Oblast, a khutor in Kagalnitskoye Rural Settlement of Azovsky District of Rostov Oblast
- Donskoy, Dubovsky District, Rostov Oblast, a khutor in Romanovskoye Rural Settlement of Dubovsky District of Rostov Oblast
- Donskoy, Morozovsky District, Rostov Oblast, a khutor in Gagarinskoye Rural Settlement of Morozovsky District of Rostov Oblast
- Donskoy, Orlovsky District, Rostov Oblast, a khutor in Donskoye Rural Settlement of Orlovsky District of Rostov Oblast
- Donskoy, Volgodonskoy District, Rostov Oblast, a settlement in Pobedenskoye Rural Settlement of Volgodonskoy District of Rostov Oblast
- Donskoy, Zernogradsky District, Rostov Oblast, a khutor in Donskoye Rural Settlement of Zernogradsky District of Rostov Oblast
- Donskoy, Kimovsky District, Tula Oblast, a settlement in Miloslavsky Rural Okrug of Kimovsky District of Tula Oblast
- Donskoy, Gorodishchensky District, Volgograd Oblast, a khutor in Panshinsky Selsoviet of Gorodishchensky District of Volgograd Oblast
- Donskoy, Kalachyovsky District, Volgograd Oblast, a settlement in Lyapichevsky Selsoviet of Kalachyovsky District of Volgograd Oblast
- Donskoy, Voronezh Oblast, a khutor in Derezovskoye Rural Settlement of Verkhnemamonsky District of Voronezh Oblast
- Donskoye, Ozyorsky District, Kaliningrad Oblast, a settlement in Novostroyevsky Rural Okrug of Ozyorsky District of Kaliningrad Oblast
- Donskoye, Kursk Oblast, a selo in Donskoy Selsoviet of Zolotukhinsky District of Kursk Oblast
- Donskoye, Lipetsk Oblast, a selo in Donskoy Selsoviet of Zadonsky District of Lipetsk Oblast
- Donskoye, Nizhny Novgorod Oblast, a village in Ivanovsky Selsoviet of the town of oblast significance of Semyonov, Nizhny Novgorod Oblast
- Donskoye, Belyayevsky District, Orenburg Oblast, a selo in Donskoy Selsoviet of Belyayevsky District of Orenburg Oblast
- Donskoye, Krasnogvardeysky District, Orenburg Oblast, a selo in Pleshanovsky Selsoviet of Krasnogvardeysky District of Orenburg Oblast
- Donskoye, Sakmarsky District, Orenburg Oblast, a selo in Arkhipovsky Selsoviet of Sakmarsky District of Orenburg Oblast
- Donskoye, Primorsky Krai, a selo under the administrative jurisdiction of Lesozavodsk City Under Krai Jurisdiction, Primorsky Krai
- Donskoye, Stavropol Krai, a selo in Donskoy Selsoviet of Trunovsky District of Stavropol Krai
- Donskoye, Tambov Oblast, a selo in Donskoy Selsoviet of Tambovsky District of Tambov Oblast
- Donskoye, Tver Oblast, a village in Andreapolsky District of Tver Oblast
- Donskaya, a village in Bokhansky District of Irkutsk Oblast
