= Chur (disambiguation) =

Chur is a city in Switzerland.

Chur or CHUR may also refer to:

- Prince-Bishopric of Chur, an ecclesiastical principality in Switzerland, part of the Holy Roman Empire.
- Roman Catholic Diocese of Chur, Switzerland
- Chondritic uniform reservoir
- Chur, Kurdistan, a village in Kurdistan Province, Iran
- Chur, Stavropol Krai, a rural locality (an aul) in Stavropol Krai, Russia
- Chur, Udmurt Republic, a rural locality (a settlement) in the Udmurt Republic, Russia
- CHUR-FM, a radio station in North Bay, Ontario, Canada
- 269550 Chur, an asteroid
- An alternate spelling of Hur (Bible)
- Chur (pseudo-deity), East Slavic pseudo-deity
