= Bryk (mountain) =

Mountain in Russia

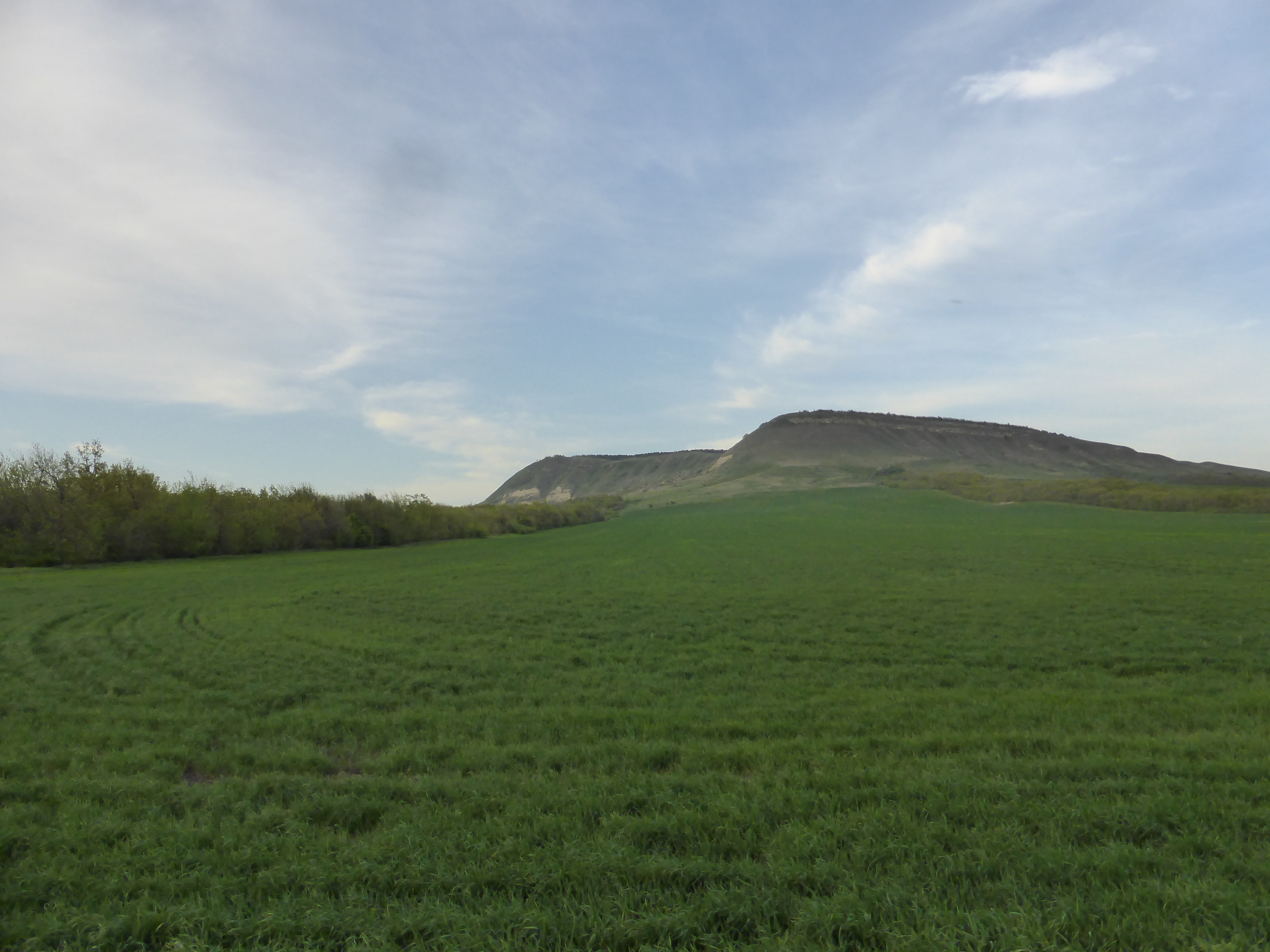

Highest point
- Elevation: 688 m (2,257 ft)
- Coordinates: 44°33′44″N 42°36′52″E

Geography
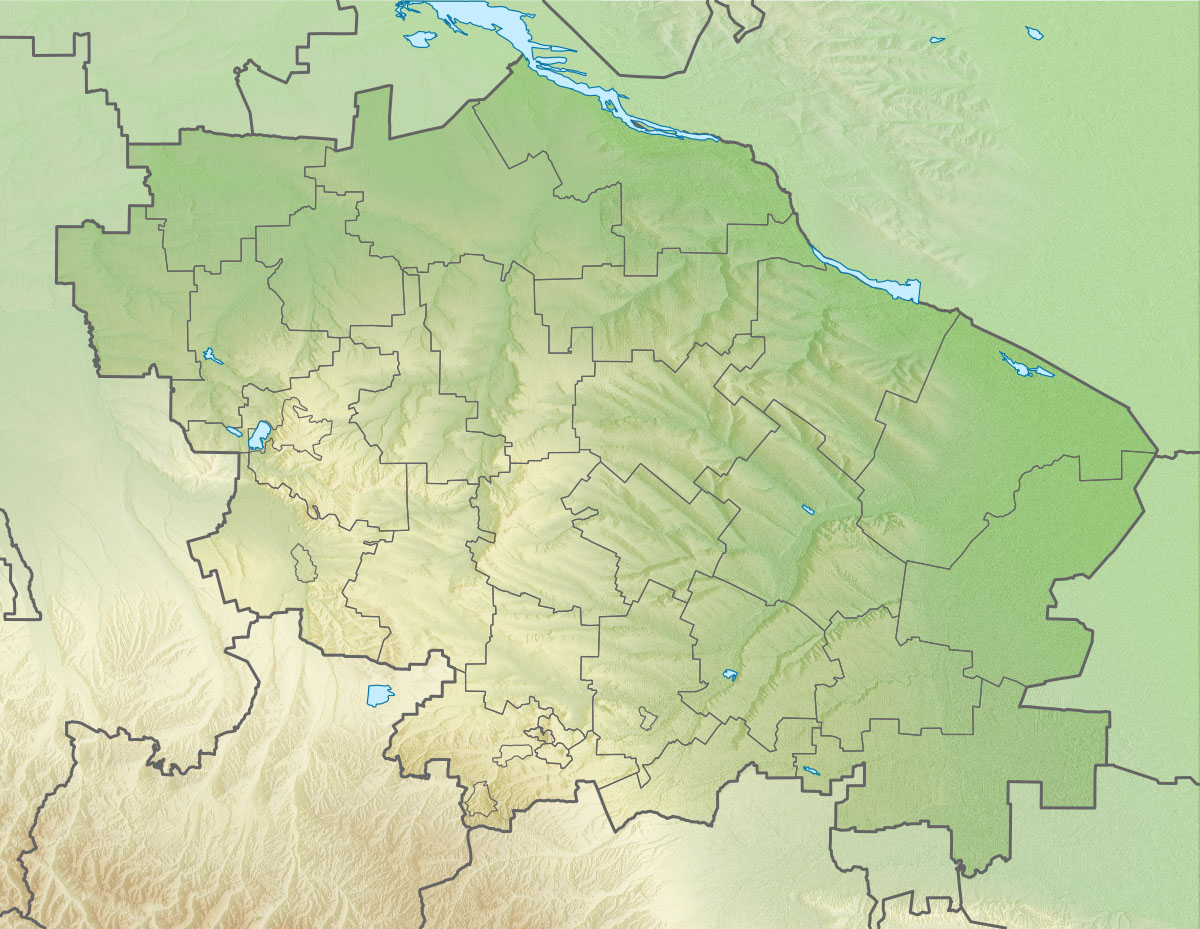
- Location within Stavropol Krai Location within Russia
- Country: Russia
- Region: Stavropol Krai
- District: Andropovsky District
- IUCN category III (natural monument or feature)
- Area: 1.0820
- Established: 15 September 1961

Bryk (Russian: Брык), is a mesa, a butte in Andropovsky District, Stavropol Krai, Russia, a complex geological and geomorphological natural monument of regional significance. Since 2013, it has been included in the list of Protected areas of Russia of regional significance in Stavropol Krai.

== Name origin ==
It is believed that the name of the mountain is related to its steep precipice and comes from the word "bryk" (fall, leap, ledge): according to the legend, the Tatar khan Sultan committed suicide during the Caucasian War, jumping together with his horse from the steep ledge of the mountain.

== Geographic location ==
It is located in the southern part of the Prikalaus Heights Stavropol Upland, on the right bank of the headwaters of the Kalaus. Its height above the sea level is 688 meters, circumference is 12 km^{2}. It is located 2 km southeast of the Sultan village and 6 km west of the Krymgireevskoe. It is cut from south to north by the Krymgireevskij tunnel (length 6.1 meters) of the main canal of the second stage of the Great Stavropol Canal, supplying water from the Kuban river in the direction from Bryk Mountain to the Alexandrovskoye village.

== Geological structure ==
It is a erosionally-denudation remnant with a plateau-shaped summit, steep western and gentle eastern slopes. It is composed of clays, sands, and limestones of the Lower and Middle Neogene (Miocenea) with abundant remains of mollusk fauna.

== Flora and fauna ==
A state protective forest belt runs across the top of the mountain, "Volgograd-Elista-Cherkessk" with a total length of 570 km, consisting of four 60 m wide strips (distance between the strips - 300 m) and includes wild and cultivated plants (oak, ash, poplar, acacia, elm, pine, pine, maple, mulberry, apricot, walnut, alycha, etc.). The northern, western and southern slopes are covered with hornbeam and ash forest with an undergrowth of hawthorn, maple, birch, elderberry, and others.

In non-forested areas, virgin meadow and steppe vegetation are preserved (feathergrass, Paeonia tenuifolia, Eremurus spectabilis, Krascheninnikovia ceratoides, and others). On sandy and stony places the following plants can be found: Silene supina, Asteraceae, Dianthus pallens, Linosyris villosa, Hieracium robustum, Odontites vulgaris, Teucrium polium, Helichrysum arenarium, and others.

The following animal species are represented: badger, hare, titmouse, falcon, sparrow, steppe eagle, Eurasian skylark, and others. In 2016, sika deer were brought here from the regional state nature reserve "Strizhament".

== Nature conservation ==
In 1961, by the resolution of the Bureau of the Stavropol Regional Committee of the CPSU and the executive committee of the Regional Council of Workers' Deputies from 15.09.1961 No. 676 "On measures to protect nature in the region" Bryk Mountain was declared a natural monument of regional importance. In 2013 it was included in the list of protected areas of regional significance in Stavropol Krai, approved by the order of the Ministry of Natural Resources and Environment of Stavropol Krai from 18.01.2013 No. 14.

The total area of the geological and geomorphological nature monument "Bryk Mountain" is 1,082 ha. The main objects of protection of the protected area are the mountain, formed by Neogene sediments; the diversity of natural landscapes (hornbeam forest and Ashenvale with hawthorn and maple undergrowth; on sandy and stony places — Silene supina, Asteraceae, Dianthus pallens, etc.).

It is planned to create a complex state nature reserve of regional significance "Bryk" with a total area of 530 ha to protect the area of herb bunchgrass steppes.

== Archaeological monuments ==
Bryk Mountain is one of the natural monuments of Stavropol Krai, combined with archaeological monuments. During the research, a mound and a cave with a cultural layer were discovered within the protected area's boundaries. These sites are still insufficiently studied.

=== Sultanovo mound ===
On the top of the mountain, the remains of a burial mound called Sultanovsky (after the name of the nearby Sultan village) can be found. It is reported to be approximately 8.5 meters high, 75 meters in circumference and 17 meters in diameter at the top platform. Beneath the mound was a rectangular crypt made of hewn stone blocks and massive sandstone blocks. Inside it there was a paired burial with burial implements. There is an assumption that the sub-mound tomb may have been built for "a member of the nobility (possibly a regional ruler) in the late 4th-3rd century BC". Researchers also note that the stone crypt discovered on Bryk is "completely uncharacteristic for funerary structures of the North Caucasus and at the same time quite common for Greek tombs in the Northern Black Sea region.

=== "Cave Monastery" ===
Right under the mound is a cave of artificial origin, where, according to legend, there was an underground monastery. The space of the cave is formed by several corridors, in the walls of which niches for icons and small chambers, probably used as cells, were hollowed out. The "monastery" could presumably form a single complex together with the burial mound and serve as a refuge first for ancient Christians and later for local monks. However, such theories have not yet been scientifically confirmed.

== See also ==
- Protected areas of Russia
- Stavropol Krai
- Nature reserve
