= Dmitry Donskoy (disambiguation) =

Dmitry Donskoy (1350–1389) was a Russian prince.

Dmitry Donskoy may also refer to:

== People ==
- False Dmitry I, or Dmitriy I Donskoi of Moscow

== Ships ==
- Russian submarine Dmitriy Donskoi (TK-208), a Typhoon-class submarine
- Russian cruiser Dmitrii Donskoi, an armoured cruiser launched in 1883 and scuttled after the Battle of Tsushima in 1905
- MV Dmitry Donskoy, a German cargo ship built in 1943 as Eberhart Essberger

== Other ==
- Dmitry Donskoy (opera), also known as The Battle of Kulikovo, the first opera written by Anton Rubinstein.
- Order of Saint Righteous Grand Duke Dmitry Donskoy, an award of the Russian Orthodox Church
- Dimitri Donskoj (film), a 1909 Russian short film

== See also ==
- Donskoy (disambiguation)
- Donskoy (surname)
