= Kochubeyevsky =

Kochubeyevsky (masculine), Kochubeyevskaya (feminine), or Kochubeyevskoye (neuter) may refer to:

- Kochubeyevsky District, a district of Stavropol Krai, Russia
- Kochubeyevskoye, a rural locality (a selo) in Kochubeyevsky District of Stavropol Krai, Russia
- Kochubeyevskaya, alternative name of Alexandronevskaya, a rural locality (a stanitsa) in Vyselkovsky District of Krasnodar Krai
