= Krymgireevskoye =

Village in Stavropol, Russia

Krymgireyevskoye Крымгиреевское
- Village
- Interactive map of Krymgireyevskoye
- Coordinates: 44.5431978°N 42.7201652°E
- Country: Russia
- Federal subject: Stavropol Krai
- Municipal district: Andropovsky
- Founded: 1866

Area
  - Total: 129.67 km^{2} (50.07 sq mi)
- Time zone: UTC+3 (MSK)
- Postal code: 357085
- OKTMO ID: 07232808001
- Website: mokrimgireevskoe.ru

Krymgireyevskoye (Крымгиреевское) is a village in Andropovsky District, Stavropol Krai, Russia. It was founded in 1866 and covers an area of 129.67 square kilometers. The village is part of the Andropovsky Municipal District.

== Name ==
The origin of the toponym Krymgireevskoe is linked to the surname of a former local landowner, Krym-Girey, a descendant of the Crimean khans of the Giray family. Other variations of the name include: Krym-Gireevo, Krym-Gireevskoe, Krymgereevskoe, Krymgireevka.

Another name, Nikolaevskoe (Nikolaevka), was given to the village in memory of settlers from a namesake settlement in Stavropol Governorate.

== Geography ==
The village is situated in the valley of the Soleny Yarok, in the upper reaches of the Mokry Karamyk River (a tributary of the Kuma River), near the eastern slopes of Mount Bryk, 20 km northeast of the district center, Kursavka. The Great Stavropol Canal runs through the area (partially in an underground collector). The Krym-Gireevo railway station on the Armavir–Mineralnye Vody line is located 14 km southwest of the village.

The village's boundaries span 6.8 km from north to south and 3.7 km from west to east, with a total area of 129.67 km². The elevation above sea level is 551 meters.

== History ==
The village was founded in 1866 by settlers from the Nikolaevskoe village in Medvezhensky Uyezd. According to the 1897 handbook Stavropol Governorate in Statistical, Geographical, Historical, and Agricultural Terms, the first settlers, dissatisfied with their chosen location, soon moved to other villages. A second group of settlers from Russia established the village permanently, but 7 versts (approximately 7.5 km) south of the original site. The area occupied by the temporary structures of the Nikolaevskoe settlers became known as "Kochevki Nikolaevtsev" (Nomads of Nikolaevskoe).

According to the same source, the land occupied by Krymgireevskoe belonged to Tatars until 1865, after which it was transferred to the state treasury in the 1890s. Local elders reported that the land was previously owned by Prince Krym-Girey, whose farmstead was located "2½ versts from the village, on the ‘Krymgireevka’ River" (another name for the Mokry Karamyk River). Other sources indicate that from 1864, the land was owned by Privy Councilor A. M. Fadeev.

In 1883, Krymgireevskoe had 4,200 residents, 566 households, and 585 houses. By 1897, the population grew to 5,500 with 761 households and 973 houses. At the beginning of the 20th century, the village had 7,200 residents, 13 commercial enterprises, 2 industrial enterprises, and a pharmacy.

In 1892, a cholera epidemic struck Krymgireevskoe, claiming 142 lives. That same year, a severe hailstorm destroyed 2,000 dessiatins of crops.

In 1918, the collectivization process began in Stavropol, but it was disrupted by the Russian Civil War. After Soviet power was firmly established, communes and artels were organized by former Red Army soldiers. In 1921, the "Ilyinskaya" artel was formed in Krymgireevskoe, followed by the "Krymgireevskoe" agricultural cooperative in 1924.

According to 1920 data, Krymgireevskaya Volost included three settlements: Krymgireevskoe village, Soluno-Dmitrievskoe settlement, and Troitsky farmstead, with a total land area of 32,022.39 dessiatins.

The village suffered greatly during the Russian Civil War and the 1933 famine, which claimed the lives of a third of its residents. During World War II, 373 villagers died on the front lines.

On April 12, 1924, the Krymgireevsky Rural Council was established, including Krymgireevskoe village (the administrative center) and Karamyk farmstead.

In 1935, with the introduction of a new district network in the North Caucasus Krai, the Krymgireevsky Rural Council was separated from Kursavsky District and incorporated into Nagutsky District. In 1953, Nagutsky District was abolished, and the rural council, along with all its settlements, was transferred to Kursavsky District. From 1963 to 1970, Krymgireevsky Rural Council was part of Mineralovodsky District. As of January 1, 1983, the rural council included only one settlement—Krymgireevskoe village.

Until March 16, 2020, the village formed the abolished rural settlement Krymgireevskoe Village.

== Population ==
According to the 1897 handbook Stavropol Governorate in Statistical, Geographical, Historical, and Agricultural Terms, the village had 1,298 registered people, 5,387 actual residents (2,691 men and 2,696 women) based on family lists, and 178 non-registered residents (88 men and 90 women). The native population primarily consisted of Malorussia, settlers from Russia's black-soil region, with a smaller portion of Great Russia from the same area. Non-registered residents were mostly relatives, neighbors, or acquaintances of the native settlers from the same provinces.

=== Ethnic composition ===
According to the 2010 Russian Census, the following ethnic groups were recorded (ethnicities below 1% are listed in the footnote):

Ethnicity	Number	Percentage
Russians	1,654	83.70
Dargins	80	4.05
Armenians	75	3.80
Chechens	52	2.63
Other	115	5.82
Total	1,976	100.00

== Local governance ==
Krymgireevskoye Duma

Administration

- 2011–2015: Valeriy Dmitrievich Gerashchenko
- Since 2015: Valeriy Petrovich Cherevashenko

== Infrastructure ==
The village hosts the rural settlement administration, a cultural center, a secondary school, a kindergarten, a medical clinic, a library (opened on May 27, 1936), and agricultural enterprises. In the southeastern part, there is a public open cemetery with an area of 35,000 m².

The village has 9 streets and 2 alleys.

== Communications ==
Mobile telephony (2G, 3G) is available in Krymgireevskoe, provided by operators Beeline, MegaFon, MTS, and Yota.

The village is included in the list of settlements in Stavropol Krai with a population of less than 3,000, lacking an access point to the Internet telecommunications network.

== Education ==
- Kindergarten No. 5 "Belochka"
- Secondary General Education School No. 10

== Agriculture ==
- Andropovsky AGROproject (cultivation of grain and oilseed crops)

== Epidemiology ==
- The village is located in an area classified as an active natural focus of tularemia.

== Archaeological sites ==
Located 1.28 km from the village, on the slope of the left side of the valley of the Shiroky stream, a left tributary of the Surkul River, is the kurgan burial ground "Kunakovsky-3" (6 kurgan mounds), dating to the Bronze Age. It holds scientific, historical, and cultural value and is an object of archaeological heritage. In 2007, during protective excavations of two kurgan mounds (5th and 6th) in the "Kunakovsky-3" burial ground, 17 burials were discovered, including those from the Middle and Late Bronze Age and the Middle Iron Age. The deceased were placed either on their backs or crouched on their sides. The burial inventory included clay censers, braziers, pots, stone beads, bronze items (knife, pendant, ring), and bone items (plates, rings).

== Historical monuments ==
In the central part of the village is a cultural heritage site (historical monument) of regional significance—a mass grave of 6 partisans who died during the Russian Civil War for Soviet power (reg. No. 261410180840005, EGROKN). According to the "Cultural Heritage" portal, the site is dated to 1918–1920 and 1952. It consists of two stone tombstones in the form of obelisks, topped with red five-pointed stars and mounted on pedestals with memorial plaques. One grave contains the remains of Red Army soldiers who died during the Russian Civil War, while the other holds Soviet Army soldiers who fell during the liberation of the village in World War II, as well as two local residents killed by the Nazis in 1942. Another monument to those who died in World War II is located at the village cemetery.

== Bibliography ==
- Bentkovsky, I. V. (1883). "LIII. Krymgireevskoe. Alexandrovsky Uyezd, 3rd Stan". In Member-Secretary of the Statistical Committee I. V. Bentkovsky (ed.). Sbornik statisticheskikh svedeniy o Stavropolskoy gubernii [Collection of Statistical Information about Stavropol Governorate]. Statistical-Geographical Guide to Stavropol Governorate, with an attached road map. Vol. X. Stavropol: Stavropol Governorate Statistical Committee. pp. 187–191.
- Nikitenko, G. A. (2008). Administrativno-territorialnoe ustroystvo Stavropolya s kontsa XVIII veka po 1920 god [Administrative-Territorial Structure of Stavropol from the Late 18th Century to 1920] (PDF). Stavropol: Государственный архив Ставропольского края. p. 705. Archived from the original (PDF) on 2018-10-23.
- Zagorulko, N. G. (2012). Istoriya Andropovskogo rayona (vtoraya polovina XIX v. — konets 30-kh godov XX v.) : ocherki [History of Andropovsky District (Second Half of the 19th Century to the Late 1930s): Essays]. Vol. 1. Nevinnomyssk: Nevinnomyssk City Printing House. p. 352.
- Mikhaylov, N. T. (1910). "Krymgireevskoe Village (also Nikolaevskoe), Alexandrovsky Uyezd, 3rd Land Section". In Priest N. T. Mikhaylov (ed.). Spravochnik po Stavropolskoy eparkhii [Handbook on the Stavropol Diocese]. Stavropol Governorate and Kuban Region (overview of cities, villages, stanitsas, and farmsteads). Yekaterinodar: Kuban Regional Administration Printing House. pp. 183–184.
- Tvalchrelidze, A. (1991). "Krymgireevskoe Village (also Nikolaevskoe)". In Tvalchrelidze, A. (ed.). Stavropolskaya guberniya v statisticheskom, geograficheskom, istoricheskom i selskokhozyaystvennom otnosheniyakh [Stavropol Governorate in Statistical, Geographical, Historical, and Agricultural Terms] (Reprint of 1897 ed.). Stavropol: Kavkazskaya Biblioteka. pp. 71–80. ISBN 5-88530-046-1.
