= Donskoy =

Donskoy (masculine), Donskaya (feminine), or Donskoye (neuter) may refer to:

- Donskoy (surname)
- Donskoy District, a district of Southern Administrative Okrug, Moscow, Russia
- Donskoy (inhabited locality) (Donskaya, Donskoye), several inhabited localities in Russia
- Donskoy Monastery, a major male monastery in Moscow, Russia
  - Donskoye Cemetery
- Donskoye (air base), an air base in Kaliningrad Oblast, Russia
- Donskoy cat, a breed of mostly hairless cat
- Donskoy ryley, a Russian musical instrument related to the hurdy-gurdy.

== See also ==
- Dmitry Donskoy (disambiguation)
