= Abdul-Gazy =

Abdul-Gazy Абдул-Газы
- Aul
- Location within Stavropol Krai Location within Russia
- Coordinates: 44°43′N 45°06′E
- Country: Russia
- Region: Stavropol Krai
- District: Neftekumsky District
- Time zone: [[UTC+3:00]]

Abdul-Gazy (Russian: Абдул-Газы) is a rural locality (a village) in Ozek-Suatsky Selsoviet of Neftekumsky District, Stavropol Krai, Russia. The population was 444 as of 2010. There are 3 streets.

== History ==
According to the 1926 census, the village was home to 103 farms with a total population of 277 people, all of whom were Turkmens. The village was part of the territory of the Ozek-Suat village council of the Achikulak district of the Dagestan ASSR as of October 1, 1929.

However, on May 1, 2017, the village council of Ozek-Suat was abolished, and Abdul-Gazy became part of a different administrative division

== Geography ==
Abdul-Gazy is located 10 km east of Neftekumsk (the district's administrative centre) by road. Neftekumsk is the nearest rural locality.

== Demography ==
Historical population
Year	Pop.	±%
1987	658	—
1926	277	−57.9%
1989	341	+23.1%
2002	672	+97.1%
2010	44	−93.5%
2014	800	+1718.2%

According to the 2002 census, the population of Abdul-Gazy was composed of 43% Dargins and 53% Turkmens.

Sunni Islam is the predominant religion in Abdul-Gazy, with the majority of the population adhering to its teachings and practices.
