= Abram-Tyube =

Abram-Tyube Абрам-Тюбе
- Aul
- Location within Stavropol Krai Location within Russia
- Coordinates: 44°18′N 45°16′E
- Country: Russia
- Region: Stavropol Krai
- District: Neftekumsky District
- Time zone: [[UTC+3:00]] (CET)

Abram-Tyube (Russian: Абрам-Тюбе) is a rural locality (an aul) in Tukuy-Mektebsky Selsoviet of Neftekumsky District, Stavropol Krai, Russia. The population was 1,059 as of 2010. There are 7 streets, a kindergarten and a secondary school.

== Etymology ==
The village's Nogai name, "Abram-Tobe avyl" (Abram-Tobe aul), refers to a large mound located west of the village that was named after a shop owned by an Armenian named Abram. The name translates to "Abrama Kurgan" and means "Aul (mound) Abram-Tobe." The village has also been known as "Abramo-Tyube" and "Abramtyube."

== History ==
According to the 1926 census, the village of Abram-Tyube had 150 households with a population of 598 people, including 328 men and 270 women. The majority of the population, 567 individuals, were Nogais, while the rest were of other ethnicities. In 1929, the village had a school and served as the administrative center of the Abram-Tyube village council, which was part of the Achikulak district of the Dagestan ASSR.

Before May 1, 2017, Abram-Tyube was part of the Rural Settlement Tukuy-Mektebsky village council in the Neftekumsk municipal district of the Stavropol Territory.

== Geography ==
Abram-Tyube is located 87 km south of Neftekumsk (the district's administrative centre) by road. Tukuy-Mekteb is the nearest rural locality.

== Demography ==
Historical population
Year	Pop.	±%
1926	598	—
1989	825	+38.0%
2002	1,245	+50.9%
2010	1,059	−14.9%
2014	700	−33.9%

According to the 2002 census, the national structure of the population in the village showed that Nogais accounted for 52% of the population, while Dargins accounted for 38%.
