= Anatoly Markov =

Russian serial killer and mass murderer

- Born: Anatoly Yuryevich Markov; 1973 (age 52–53); Stavropol, Stavropol Krai, RSFSR
- Other name: "The Psotino Butcher"
- Conviction: Murder x12
- Penalty: 19 years imprisonment

Details
- Victims: 12
- Span of crimes: 2001–2002
- Country: Russia
- States: Stavropol, Moscow, Ryazan
- Date apprehended: July 6, 2022

Anatoly Yuryevich Markov (Russian: Анатолий Юрьевич Марков; born 1973), known as The Psotino Butcher (Russian: Псотинский мясник), is a Russian serial killer and mass murderer who committed 12 murders between 2001 and 2002 across three regions, ten of which were done with the help of Ukrainian accomplice Alexander Yuryevich Lesnoy (Russian: Александр Юрьевич Лесной; born February 9, 1975).

The killings remained unsolved until 2022, when both perpetrators were arrested. Despite the severity of the crimes, both Markov and Lesnoy were given lesser sentences of 19 and 17 years imprisonment, respectively, due to the fact the statute of limitations passing on the aggravated murder charge.

== Early life ==
Anatoly Markov was born in 1973 in Stavropol, Stavropol Krai. Growing up in a seemingly normal family, the Markovs moved to the Checheno-Ingush ASSR shortly after Anatoly's birth, where they spent the next two decades. In the mid-1990s, due to hostilities in the First Chechen War, the entire family moved back to Stavropol Krai and settled in the village of Grigoropolisskaya.

After graduating from high school, Markov had problems finding employment and was forced to engage in low-skilled labor. Since the early 2000s, he started living as a vagrant, developed an alcohol addiction and amassed convictions for theft, fraud and causing harm to health. Despite this, he was regarded positively by acquaintances, who described him as calm and friendly.

== Murders ==
=== Double murder and meeting Lesnoy ===
In October 2001, Markov committed a double murder in Novoalexandrovsk by hacking two men to death with an axe during an argument, after which he left Stavropol Krai for Moscow. While in the capital, he made a living by begging, stealing and selling stolen goods. Not long after this, he became friends with Alexander Lesnoy, a Ukrainian criminal and fugitive who was hiding in Russia to avoid murder charges in his home country. Over the course of several days, the pair would commit multiple murders.

The pair's first joint murder was committed on February 6, 2002. Their victim was a resident of Moscow's Arbat District, whom they killed during a quarrel after drinking alcohol, after which they stole money and valuables from his apartment.

=== Lukhovitsky Massacre ===
The next day, Markod and Lesnoy traveled to the village of Psotino, where 35-year-old Olga Iskanderova, an acquaintance of Markov who had recently started abusing alcohol, lived. On February 9, a drinking party was organized at Iskanderova's house in order to celebrate Lesnoy's birthday, with the attendees being 58-year-old pensioner and twice-convicted murderer Yuri Khardin; Moldovan national Nina Kurochkina and her son 19-year-old Gennady, as well as a middle-aged man surnamed Vasiliev. Throughout the day and until nightfall, the group, including Markov and Lesnoy, drank alcohol until a conflict occurred between the guests. In their drunken stupor, Markov and Lesnoy grabbed an axe and knife, respectively, after which they murdered the Kurochkins and Vasiliev. They then drank more alcohol before stumbling to another room, where they murdered Iskanderova and her 8-year-old daughter Lida in their sleep. Then, fearing that they might be remembered by Khardin - who had gone home shortly before the massacre - the pair went to his home, knocked on the door and killed him when he opened it. They then barged inside and happened upon his 63-year-old wife Raisa, whom they killed as well. Markov and Lesnoy then stole several items of value and the remaining alcohol, which they exchanged for meat. The corpses of the victims were found two days later by a neighbor.

=== Final murders and laying low ===
Shortly after killing everyone, Markov and Lesnoy bought train tickets bound for Ryazan. On February 10, they met Nikolai Bugaichenko, a 62-year-old alcoholic, at the station in Ryazhsk. Bugaichenko allowed them to sleep at his home for the night, but later that same day, while the trio and an acquaintance of Bugaichenko's, 25-year-old Valery Tishuk, started drinking, another quarrel arose. Similar to their previous victims, Markov and Lesnoy grabbed an axe and knife and proceeded to stab and hack both men.

After these final murders, Markov and Lesnoy parted ways - the former returned to his parents' house, while the latter returned to Ukraine. Despite disappearing for several months, Markov's family members did not become suspicious, as they knew he was a vagrant and would often disappear from home for months at a time. In the following years, he would amass more convictions for petty offences.

== Original investigation ==
The mass murder in Psotino caused a public outcry, and not long after, the police announced that they had identified two day laborers as the main suspects. It turned out that on February 8, the men had visited Iskanderova's house, but both later left. Both were tracked down, and almost immediately the two detainees wrote a confession in which the motive was supposedly that one of them had been infected with AIDS by Iskanderova, but the case never went to trial and both were eventually proven innocent.

During the course of the investigation, witnesses were found from among the villagers and workers at the nearby Podlipki Railway Station. According to the, there were two non-local men - one of them carrying a large sports bag - who were seen heading to buy train tickets en route to Ryazan on the day after the murders. Investigators quickly linked the mass killing to the double murder in Ryazhsk committed on the next day, because a sports bag similar to the one described by the witnesses was found at the crime scene. When inspected, the bag was found to contain a watch belonging to one of the Psotino victims.

The investigation considered several possibilities, but none of them yielded results, leaving the murders to become cold cases.

== Re-investigation, arrests and trial ==
In 2022, the Investigative Committee decided to reopen their previously suspended cases and utilize new technologies in an attempt to resolve them. In June of that year, investigators started looking at the crime scenes associated with Markov and Lesnoy, where they found a vodka bottle left from Psotino that had unidentified fingerprints on it. After analyzing them, they were linked to the now-49-year-old Anatoly Markov.

On July 6, 2022, Markov was detained at his parents' home in Grigoropolisskaya. Immediately after his arrest, he confessed to all of the murders in great detail and even showed newspaper clippings he had kept about the crimes. When asked about his accomplice, Markov implicated Lesnoy, who was detained approximately a month later. During the investigation, both men readily admitted responsibility, but did not show remorse for their actions - Markov in particular claimed that he considered himself a "cleaner" who rid society of "all kinds of scum". Forensic psychiatric evaluations determined that both suspects were sane and did not suffer from any mental abnormalities.

Their joint trial began on November 9, 2023. By December 20, both Markov and Lesnoy were found guilty on all charges, but due to the statute of limitations on the aggravated murders having lapsed, the pair were sentenced to 19 and 17 years imprisonment at a strict-regime penal colony.

== See also ==
- List of Russian serial killers
