= Andropovsky =

Andropovsky (masculine), Andropovskaya (feminine), or Andropovskoye (neuter) may refer to:

- Andropovsky District, a district of Stavropol Krai, Russia
- Andropovsky (rural locality), in Rostov Oblast, Russia
