= Andrey Titenko =

Soviet soldier during WWII (1918–2022)

- Андрей Лаврентьевич Титенко
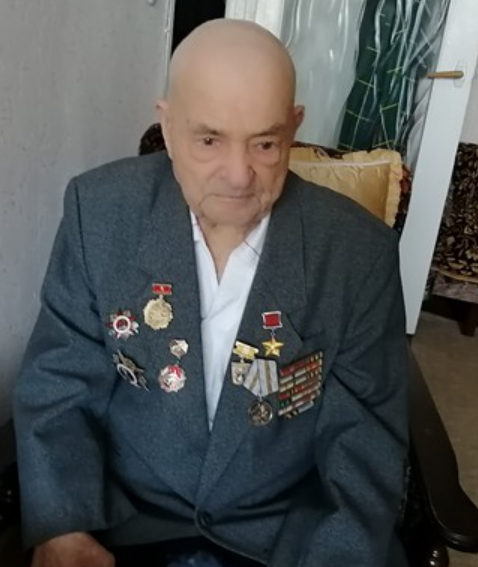
- Titenko in 2020
- Born: 15 December 1918; Zhykhove, Novgorod-Seversky Uyezd, Chernihiv Governorate, Ukrainian People's Republic
- Died: 2 November 2022 (aged 103); Stavropol Krai, Russia
- Military career
- Allegiance: Soviet Union
- Branch: Red Army
- Service years: 1941–1945
- Rank: Sergeant
- Conflicts: World War II
- Awards: Hero of the Soviet Union

Andrey Lavrentievich Titenko (Russian: Андрей Лаврентьевич Титенко; 15 December 1918 – 2 November 2022) was a Soviet soldier who served during World War II and recipient of the title Hero of the Soviet Union.

== Early life ==
Titenko was born on 15 December 1918 in the village of Zhykhove in Chernihiv Governorate of Ukraine, into a peasant family of Russian ethnicity. After graduating from seven classes of school, he worked as a tractor driver on a collective farm.

== Military career ==
Titenko joined the Red Army in 1941. Following the outbreak of Operation Barbarossa in June 1941, he fought with the Southern, 1st Baltic and 3rd Belorussian fronts from March 1942. Titenko fought in the battles of the Caucasus and Stalingrad, and in the Donbass, Dnieper–Carpathian, Crimean and East Prussian offensives. He was wounded twice during the war.

On 18 March 1945, during the East Prussian offensive, Titenko served as the commander of a battery of 45 mm anti-tank guns within the 6th Red Banner Rifle Regiment. He distinguished himself during a battle for the fortified stronghold at the town of Deutsch Thierau in Königsberg. He organized a perimeter defense and the five-man gun crew under his command managed to repel an attack by two platoons of German infantry. They killed 80 enemy soldiers and destroyed four machine gun emplacements. For this feat, Titenko was nominated for the title of Hero of the Soviet Union. After the battle, he was admitted to the hospital due to his injuries and underwent six operations in order to recover.

By decree of the Presidium of the Supreme Soviet of the USSR of 19 April 1945 for the exemplary performance of the combat mission of the command in the fight against the Nazi invaders and the courage and heroism shown at the same time, Titenko was awarded the title of Hero of the Soviet Union with the award of the Order of Lenin and the Gold Star medal. However, he received no confirmation of the award. As a result, he had to apply to various institutions to find his award documents. The documents were found with the assistance of the headquarters of the North Caucasus Military District and he received the title Hero of Soviet Union on 24 October 1947.

Following the end of World War II, Titenko was demobilised from the Red Army.

== Later life ==
After his demobilisation from the military, Titenko worked in factories at the Kalmyk ASSR, and in the villages of Grigoropolisskaya and Novotroitskayaya in Stavropol Krai. He joined the Communist Party of the Soviet Union in 1953. From 1954, he resided in the town of Izobilny, where he was in charge of a factory. He later worked as a director of a food processing plant and headed the fire department of Izobilnensky District for 27 years. Titenko was named an honorary citizen of the district, and in 2020, he was named an honorary citizen of Stavropol Krai. He became a centenarian in 2018.

Titenko died on 2 November 2022, at age 103. At the time of his death, he was the oldest living recipient of the title Hero of the Soviet Union.

== Awards and decorations ==
| Hero of the Soviet Union (19 April 1945) |
| Order of Lenin (19 April 1945) |
| Order of the Patriotic War, 1st class (6 April 1985) |
| Order of Glory, 3rd class (14 October 1944) |
| Medal "For Courage", twice (19 October 1943, 6 June 1944) |
| Medal "For the Defence of Stalingrad" (1942) |
| Medal "For the Defence of the Caucasus" (1944) |
| Medal "For the Capture of Königsberg" (1945) |
| Medal "For the Victory over Germany in the Great Patriotic War 1941–1945" (1945) |
