= Tambov Donskoye Airport =

Airport in Russia

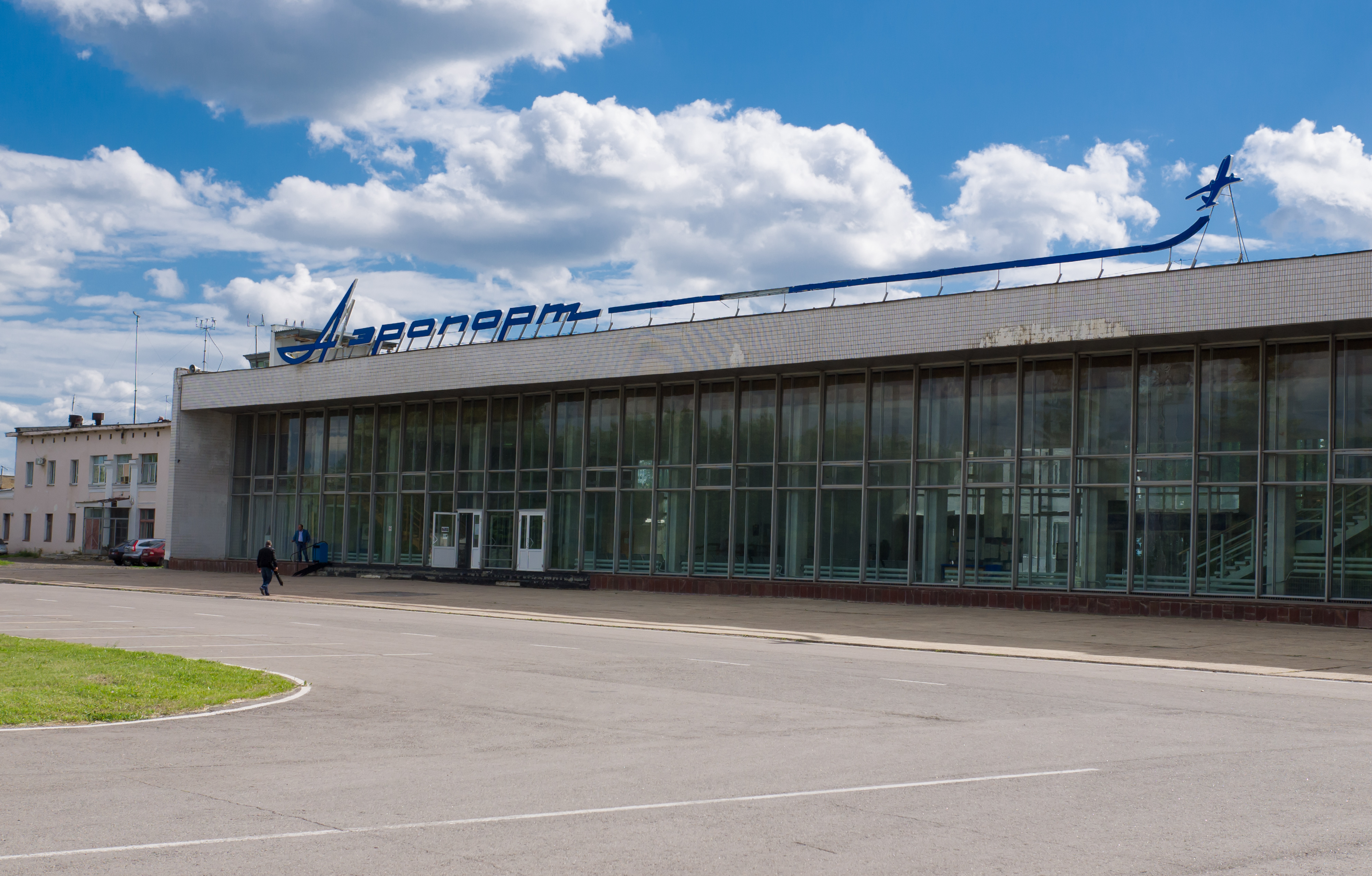
- IATA: TBW; ICAO: UUOT

Summary
- Airport type: Public
- Serves: Donskoye, Tambov Oblast, Russia
- Elevation AMSL: 417 ft / 127 m
- Coordinates: 52°48′21″N 41°28′58″E
- Website: www.airport.tambov.ru

Map
- Location of the airport in the Tambov region

Runways
Direction	Length		Surface
Direction	m	ft	Surface
14/32	2,100	6,890	Concrete
- Sources: GCM, STV

Tambov Donskoye Airport (IATA: TBW) is an airport serving city of Tambov, located in Donskoye, 10 kilometres (6.2 mi) northeast of Tambov, in the Tambov Oblast of Russia.

== Airlines and destinations ==
Airlines	Destinations
RusLine	Moscow–Vnukovo, Saint Petersburg

== See also ==
- List of airports in Russia
