= Yutsa =

Village in Predgorny District, Russia

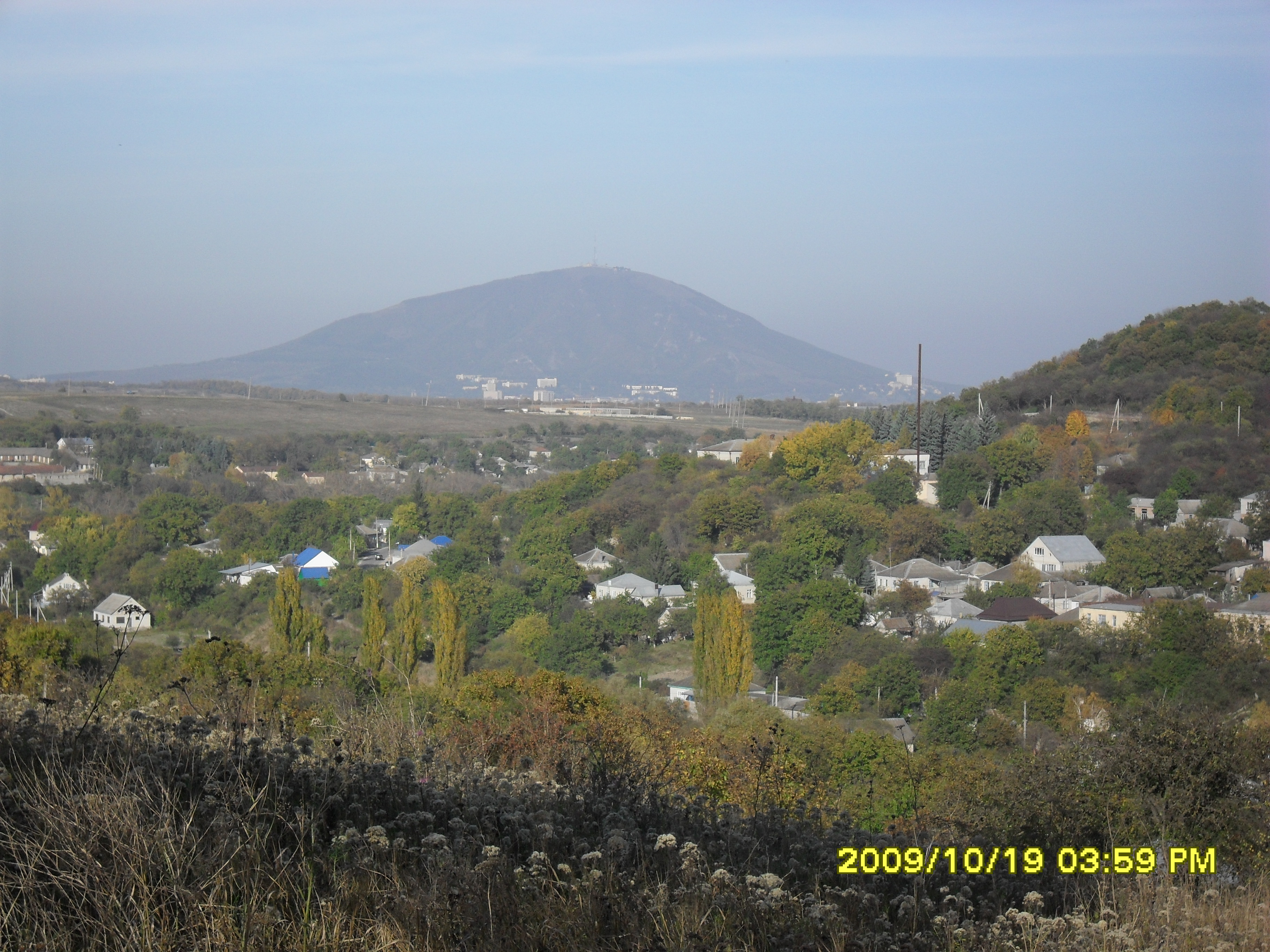
View of Village Yutsa

Yutsa (Russian: Юца) is a rural locality (a selo) in Predgorny District of Stavropol Krai, Russia. Population: 9,427 (2010 census); 8,548 (2002 census).

The exact date when Yutsa was established is unknown, but estimated to be in the 1850s–1860s. The official foundation date is considered to be 1885, by the Baptists.

During collectivization over a thousand Spiritual Christians were relocated here, mostly Molokane and Pryguny from Salsky District, Rostov oblast who were born in Kars Oblast (now Turkey).
