= Stavropol Governorate =

1847–1924 unit of Russia

Coordinates: 45.0500°N 41.9833°E

Stavropol Governorate Ставропольская губерния
- Governorate of Russian Empire (1847–1917), Russian Republic, and RSFSR (1917–1924)
- 1847–1924
- Coat of arms

- Location within the Russian Empire
- Capital: Stavropol
- Area
- 60,600 km^{2} (23,400 sq mi)
- Population
  - 1897: 873,301
- History
  - Established: 1847
  - Disestablished: 1924
Preceded by	Succeeded by
Caucasus Governorate	Kuban Oblast; Stavropol Soviet Republic

Stavropol Governorate (Russian: Ставропольская губерния, romanized: Stavropol'skaya guberniya) was an administrative-territorial unit (guberniya) of the Russian Empire and the Russian SFSR. It roughly corresponded to most of present-day Stavropol Krai. It was created in 1847 and disbanded in 1924.

== Demographics ==
As of 1897, 873,301 people populated the oblast. Russians constituted the majority of the population. Significant minorities consisted of Ukrainians. Total Slavic population was 804,153 (92%)

=== Ethnic groups in 1897 ===
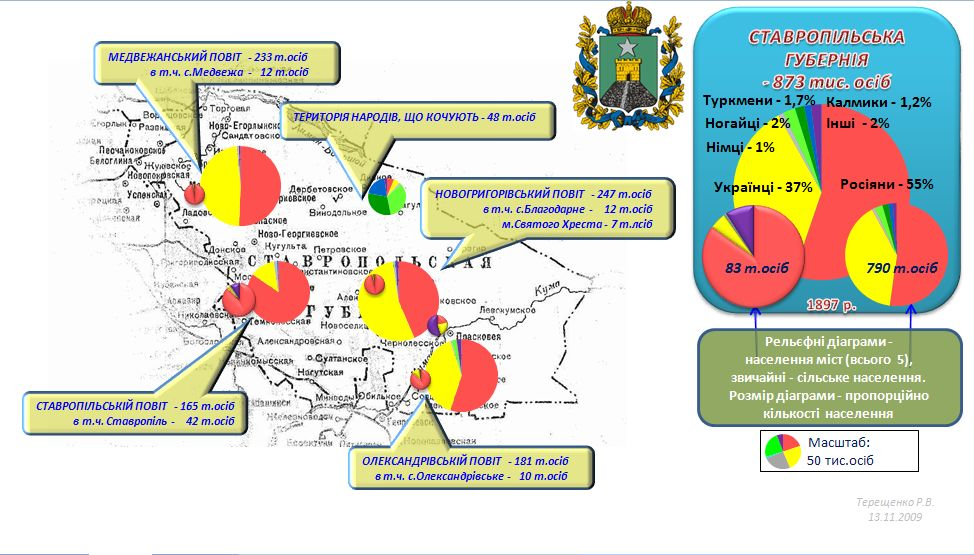
Ethnic groups in 1897

TOTAL	873,301	100%
Russians	482,495	55,2%
Ukrainians	319,817	36,6%
Nogais	19,651	2,3%
Caucasian Turkmens	14,896	1,7%
Kalmyks	10,814	1,2%
Germans	8,601	1%
Armenians	5,385	0,6%

== See also ==
- Krymgireevskoye
