= Soluno-Dmitriyevskoye =

Soluno-Dmitriyevskoye Солуно-Дмитриевское (Russian)
- Location within Stavropol Krai Location within European Russia Location within Russia
- Coordinates: 44°24′09″N 42°43′19″E
- Country: Russia
- Federal subject: Stavropol Krai
- District: Andropovsky District

Soluno-Dmitriyevskoye (Russian: Солуно-Дмитриевское) is a rural locality (a village) in Andropovsky District of Stavropol Krai, Russia. Population: 3,147 (2010 census); 3,212 (2002 census).
