= Chur, Stavropol Krai =

Chur Чур
- Interactive map of Chur
- Location of Chur
- Coordinates: 45°24′42″N 43°25′21″E
- Country: Russia
- Federal subject: Stavropol Krai
- Founded: 1865

Population
  - Estimate (2014): 700 )
- Time zone: UTC+3 (MSK)
- Postal code: 356540
- OKTMO ID: 07656419116

Chur (Russian: Чур) is a village (aul) in Turkmensky District of Stavropol Krai, Russia. Population: 800 (2006 est.). Chur is a community with a majority of the population being Turkmens and a local religious organization of Sunni Muslims of the Hanafi madhhab. The village is also home to a mosque, built in 2007 at the expense of local entrepreneurs, and a grave of a civil war partisan, honoring those who died in the struggle for the power of the Soviets.

== Etymology ==
The etymology of the village of Chur can be traced back to its historical roots. The name of the village can be translated as "border" or "limit". This interpretation suggests that the name of the village is tied to its geographical location and function as a boundary or division between different territories.

However, there is another theory that suggests the village was named after its founder.

In the work of A. A. Volodin, “Trukhmenskaya steppe and trukhmeny” (1905), it is indicated that the village Chur received its name from the nomadic trukhmen people. This source provides additional insight into the cultural and ethnic background of the village and its connection to the trukhmen people. The trukhmen were a Turkic-speaking nomadic ethnic group that inhabited the steppes of the northern Caucasus region.

== History ==
=== Founding and early history ===
Aul Chur was founded in 1865 in the gully of the same name. It was inhabited mainly by Chovdur. In the report of the Trukhmensky bailiff for 1880, the year is mentioned as a "settled village".

On January 1, 1902, there were 79 houses with 448 inhabitants in Chura. The allotment of the aul, stretching out in a narrow strip to the south and south-west of the Aigurka River, in 1903 amounted to 12,000 acres of land (of which 5100 were leased out). On January 1 of the same year, 1 Muslim school (mekteb) operated in Chur, in which 10 boys and 5 girls studied.

=== 1920s to 1930s ===
According to the data for 1920, the village was listed as part of the Mashtak-Kulak volost of the Turkmen district of the Blagodarnensky district.

In 1936, on the territory of the village of Chur, a collective farm was formed named Gofitsky, which in 1952 was merged with the collective farms Voroshilov (Mashtak-Kulak) and Lenin (village Vladimirovka).

=== War years and aftermath ===
Before the start of the Great Patriotic War, residents of the abandoned villages of Aigur and Edisan Gora moved to Mashtak-Kulak and Chur.

=== Administrative changes ===
In 1956, the Turkmen region was abolished with the transfer of the territory to the Petrovsky, Blagodarnensky and Arzgirsky regions. On March 1, 1966, the village of Chur was part of the Letne-Stavochny village council of the Petrovsky district.

=== Restoration of the Turkmen Region ===
In 1970, the Turkmen region was restored, and the Letne-Stavochny village council with all settlements (including the village of Chur) again became part of it.
