= Bezopasnoye =

Bezopasnoye Безопасное
- Selo
- Interactive map of Bezopasnoye
- Location of Bezopasnoye Bezopasnoye (Stavropol Krai)
- Coordinates: 45°38′15″N 41°56′18″E
- Country: Russia
- Federal subject: Stavropol Krai
- Elevation: 82 m (269 ft)

Population (2010 Census)
  - Total: 6,598
  - Estimate (2021): 6,627 (+0.4%)

Administrative status
  - Subordinated to: Trunovsky District
- Time zone: UTC+3 (MSK)
- Postal code: 356190
- OKTMO ID: 07654402101

Bezopasnoye (Russian: Безопасное) is a rural locality (a selo) in Trunovsky District of Stavropol Krai, Russia. Population: 6,598 (2010 census);
