= Chur (pseudo-deity) =

Chur (Russian: Чур) is a Slavic pseudo-deity speculated in 19th century to exist in Slavic mythology.

Leonard Arthur Magnus wrote that this god was reconstructed into the Slavic pantheon as a God of Boundaries, although some researchers, such as Ivan Sakharov, deny the existence of any positive knowledge about Chur. In particular, Vasily Klyuchevsky assumed the existence of such a household deity, judging from the traces remained in the language, and compared Chur with ancient Roman deity Terminus.

The Brockhaus and Efron Lesser Encyclopedic Dictionary gave the following definition: "Chur, in Slavic mythology, a deity of boundary marks, who patronized acquisition and profit. Symbol: чурки (churki) and чурбаны (churbany), (Note: translated as small and large blocks of wood, respectively) that is, boundary marks."

In Russian language "chur" is preserved in a number of expressions. Magnus wrote that an expression "chur menya ot nego" (let's have no more of him" was used to stop an unpleasant conversation. In modern Russian the exclamation "Chur menya!" is used as a spell against something unpleasant; the verb "churatsya" means "to shun", "Чур, моё!" is akin to "Finders keepers!", etc.

Max Vasmer in his Etymological Dictionary reports doubts expressed by other Slavists (Stanisław Rożniecki and Aleksander Brückner) and marks as doubtful various etymological origins and associations.

== Literary examples ==
In The Petty Demon by Fyodor Sologub: A woman told Peredonov (the protagosist) that someone could have put spell on vodka. Peredonv, in panic, splashed vodka out and shouted: "Chur me, chur, chur, chur! A conspiracy against the conspirator, let the evil tongue dry up, let the black eye burst. It's karachun for him, and chur-perechur for me" [Чур меня, чур, чур, чур! Заговор на заговорщика, злому языку сохнуть, чёрному глазу лопнуть. Ему карачун, меня чур-перечур] .
