= Predgorny District =

Predgorny District Предгорный район (Russian)
- District
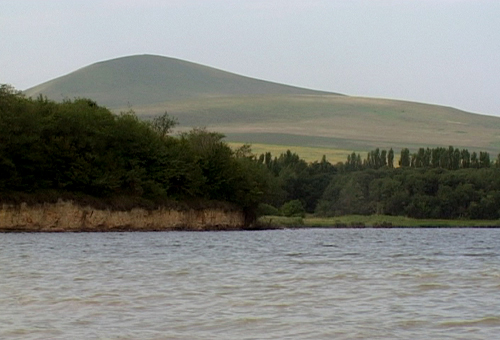
- Lake Tambukan is partially located in Predgorny District

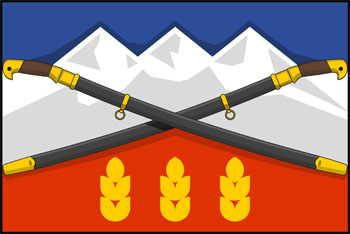
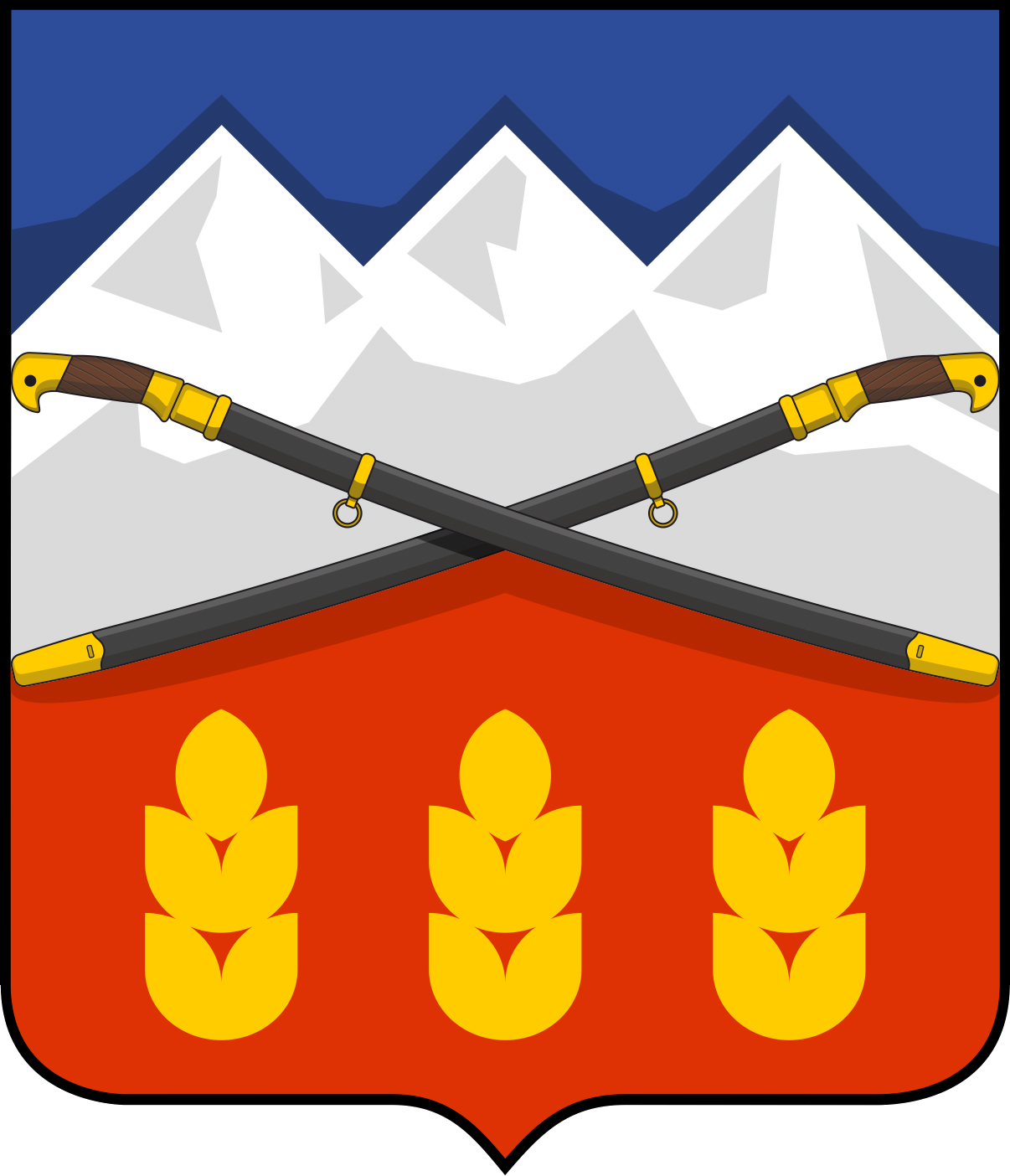
- Flag Coat of arms
- Location of Predgorny District in Stavropol Krai
- Coordinates: 44°02′N 42°52′E
- Country: Russia
- Federal subject: Stavropol Krai
- Established: 23 November 1959
- Administrative center: Yessentukskaya

Area
  - Total: 2,047 km^{2} (790 sq mi)

Population (2010 Census)
  - Total: 106,775
  - Density: 52.16/km^{2} (135.1/sq mi)
  - Urban: 0%
  - Rural: 100%

Administrative structure
  - Administrative divisions: 12 Selsoviets
  - Inhabited localities: 46 rural localities

Municipal structure
  - Municipally incorporated as: Predgorny Municipal District
  - Municipal divisions: 0 urban settlements, 15 rural settlements
- Time zone: UTC+3 (MSK)
- OKTMO ID: 07648000
- Website: http://www.predgor-ray.ru

Predgorny District (Russian: Предго́рный райо́н) is an administrative district (raion), one of the twenty-six in Stavropol Krai, Russia. Municipally, it is incorporated as Predgorny Municipal District. It is located in the south of the krai. The area of the district is 2,047 square kilometers (790 sq mi). Its administrative center is the rural locality (a stanitsa) of Yessentukskaya. Population: 106,775 (2010 census); 104,391 (2002 Census); 90,955 (1989 Census). The population of Yessentukskaya accounts for 18.9% of the district's total population.
