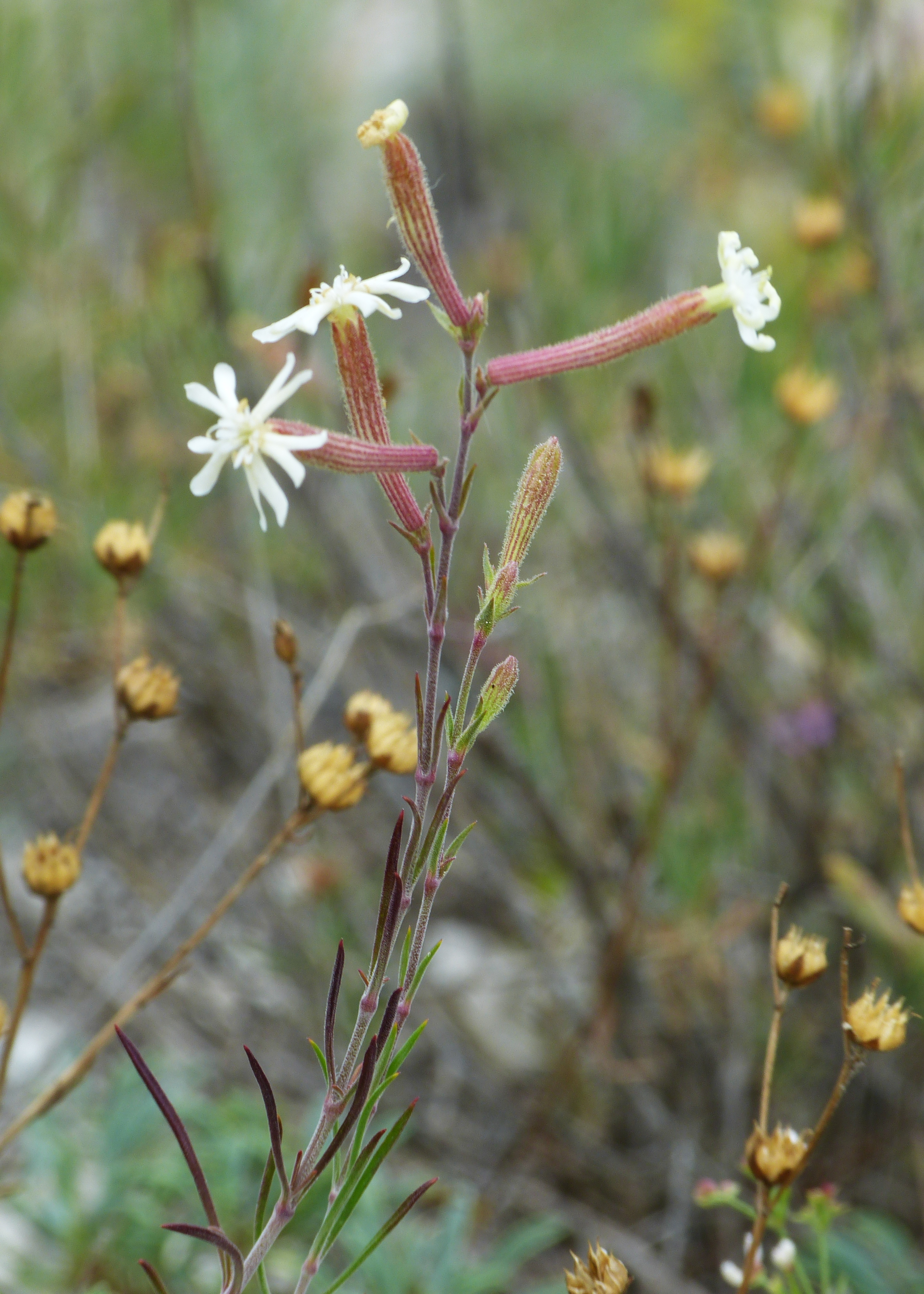

Scientific classification
- Kingdom: Plantae
- Clade: Tracheophytes
- Clade: Angiosperms
- Clade: Eudicots
- Order: Caryophyllales
- Family: Caryophyllaceae
- Genus: Silene
- Species: S. supina

Binomial name
- Silene supina M.Bieb.

Synonyms
- Silene spergulifolia; Silene soskae Cernjavski

= Silene supina =

Species of flowering plant

Silene supina is a species of flowering plant in the family Caryophyllaceae. It is native to the Balkans, North Caucasus, and Iran.

== Occurrence ==
The species grows on stony slopes and sand. The species can be found in Albania, Greece, Croatia, Slovenia, Serbia, North Macedonia, Republic of Bosnia and Herzegovina, Montenegro and in the North Caucasus.

== Subspecies ==
Subspecies of this species include:

- Silene spergulifolia subsp. soskae
- Silene spergulifolia subsp. spergulifolia
