= Arzgirsky District =

Arzgirsky District Арзгирский район (Russian)
- District
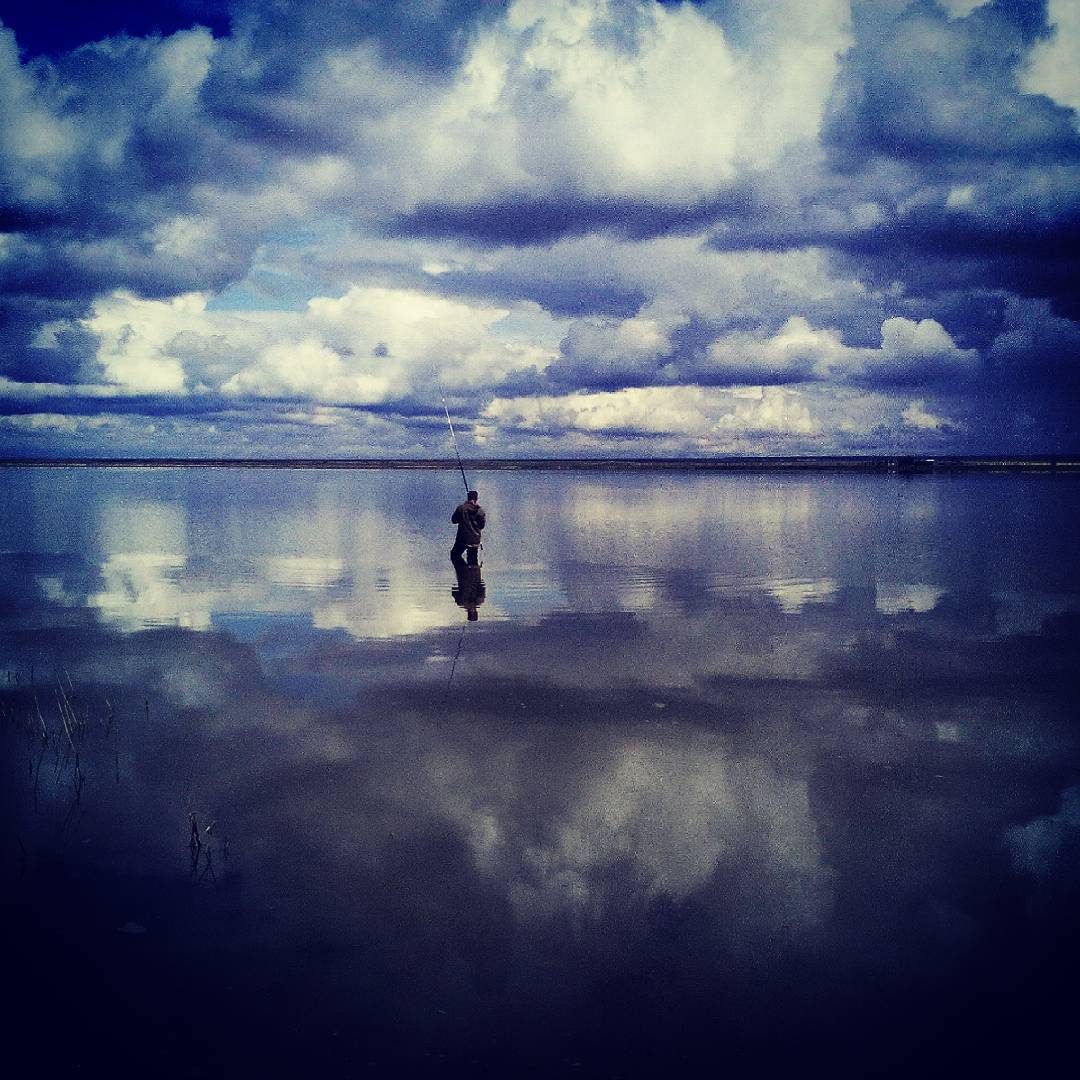
- Chograysky Reserve, Arzgirsky District

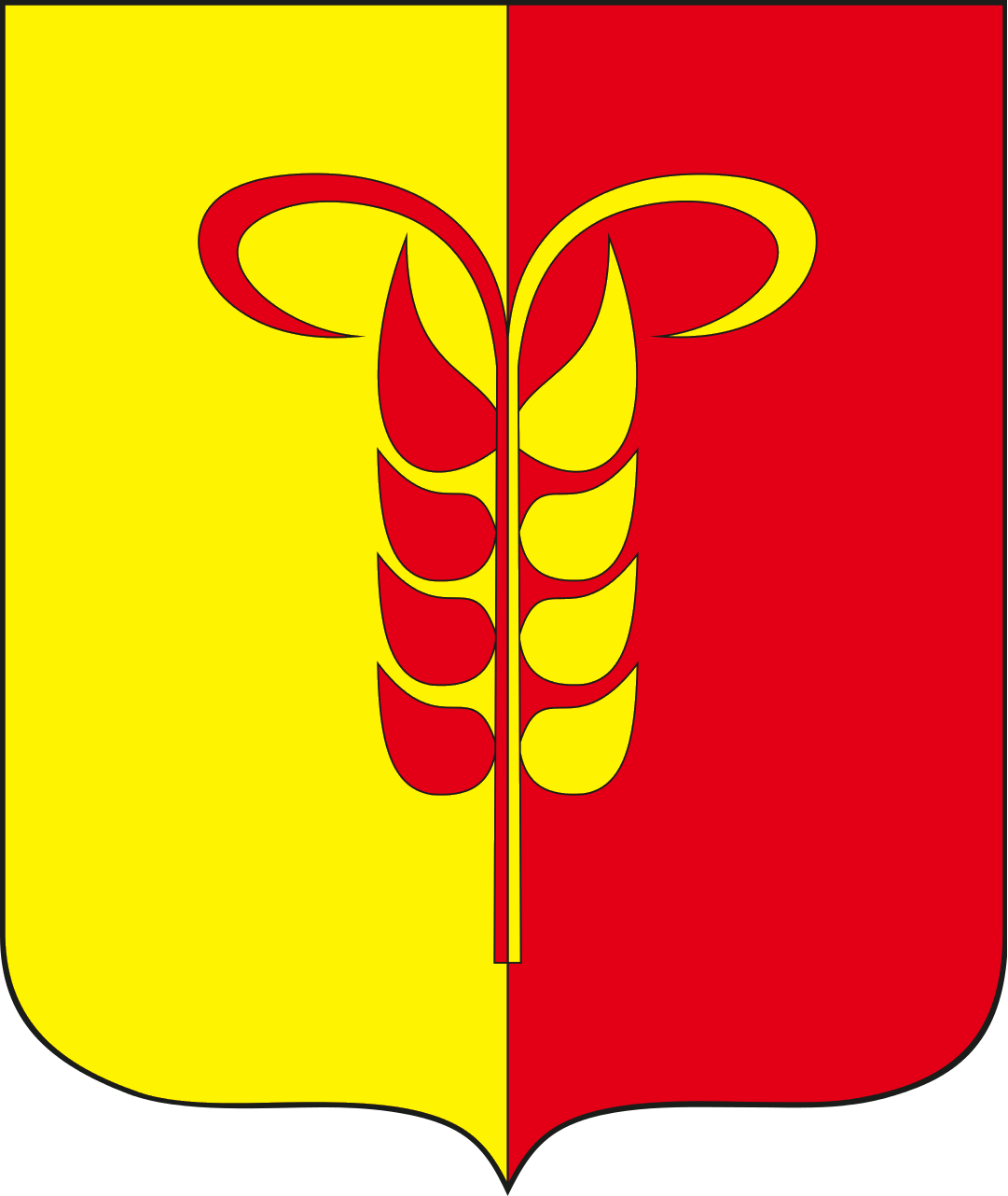
- Flag Coat of arms
- Location of Arzgirsky District in Stavropol Krai
- Coordinates: 45°22′N 44°13′E
- Country: Russia
- Federal subject: Stavropol Krai
- Established: 2 June 1924
- Administrative center: Arzgir

Area
  - Total: 3,383 km^{2} (1,306 sq mi)

Population (2010 Census)
  - Total: 26,298
  - Density: 7.774/km^{2} (20.13/sq mi)
  - Urban: 0%
  - Rural: 100%

Administrative structure
  - Administrative divisions: 3 selsoviet
  - Inhabited localities: 11 rural localities

Municipal structure
  - Municipally incorporated as: Arzgirsky Municipal District
  - Municipal divisions: 0 urban settlements, 8 rural settlements
- Time zone: UTC+3 (MSK)
- OKTMO ID: 07607000
- Website: http://www.arzgiradmin.ru/

Arzgirsky District (Russian: Арзги́рский райо́н) is an administrative district (raion), one of the twenty-six in Stavropol Krai, Russia. Municipally, it is incorporated as Arzgirsky Municipal District. It is located in the northeast of the krai. The area of the district is 3,383 square kilometers (1,306 sq mi). Its administrative center is the rural locality (a selo) of Arzgir. Population: 26,298 (2010 census); 28,733 (2002 Census); 29,236 (1989 Census). The population of Arzgir accounts for 56.0% of the district's total population.
