= MV Dmitry Donskoy =

German cargo ship

History
- Name: Eberhart Essberger (1943-45); Empire Ayr (1945-46); Dmitry Donskoy (1946-74)
- Owner: J T Essberger, Hamburg (1943-45); Ministry of War Transport (1945-46); Baltic Shipping Co, Leningrad (1946-74)
- Operator: Owner operated except:-; F C Strick & Co Ltd (1945-46)
- Port of registry: (Nazi Germany) Hamburg (1943-45); (United Kingdom) London (1945-46); (Soviet Union) Leningrad (1946-74)
- Builder: Öresundsvarvet, Landskrona
- Yard number: 73
- Launched: 11 May 1943
- Completed: 20 January 1944
- Identification: Official Number 180681 (1945-46); Code Letters GNPS (1945-46)
- Fate: Scrapped 1974

General characteristics
- Tonnage: 5,061 GRT
- Length: 438 ft 8 in (133.71 m)
- Beam: 57 ft 2 in (17.42 m)
- Depth: 29 ft 2 in (8.89 m)
- Propulsion: 2 x SCSA diesel engines (A/B Götavarken, Gothenburg) 990 hp (740 kW)
- Speed: 10 knots (19 km/h)

Dmitry Donskoy was a 5,061-ton German cargo ship which was built in 1943 as Eberhart Essberger. Taken as a British war prize in 1945, she was renamed Empire Ayr. She was allocated to the Soviet Union in 1946 and served until scrapped in 1974.

== History ==
Eberhart Essberger was built by Öresundsvarvet, Landskrona, and launched on 11 May 1943. She was completed on 20 January 1944. She was built for J T Essberger, Hamburg. Eberhart Essberger participated in Operation Hannibal in January 1945. She was taken as a war prize in Kiel in May 1945 and ownership passed to the British Ministry of War Transport. She operated under the management of F C Strick & Co Ltd. In 1946, 'Empire Ayr' brought the first consignment of 4,000 long tons (4,100 t) of dates to reach Liverpool that year. Later that year, she was allocated to the Soviet Union and renamed Dimtry Donskoy (Дмитрий Донской). She was operated by the Baltic Shipping Co, Leningrad, and served until she was scrapped in the fourth quarter of 1974.

== Official Number and code letters ==
Official Numbers were a forerunner to IMO Numbers.

Empire Ayr had the UK Official Number 180681 and used the Code Letters GNPS
