= Donskoye, Tambov Oblast =

Village in Tambovsky District, Tambov Oblast, Russia

- Interactive map of Donskoye, Tambov Oblast
- Location of Donskoye, Tambov Oblast Donskoye, Tambov Oblast (Tambov Oblast)
- Coordinates: 52°46′33″N 41°29′18″E
- Country: Russia
- Federal subject: Tambov Oblast

Population
  - Estimate (2021): 4,676 )
- Time zone: UTC+3 (MSK)
- Postal code: 392501
- Dialing code: +7 4752
- OKTMO ID: 68640430101

Donskoye (Russian: Донское) is a rural locality (a selo) in Tambovsky District of Tambov Oblast, Russia. It is the administrative centre of Donskoy Selsoviet and lies on the Tsna River at the northeastern edge of the city of Tambov, adjoining the city's Oktyabrsky District.

== Geography ==
Donskoye stands on the Tsna and immediately adjoins the northeastern outskirts of Tambov. Tambov Donskoye Airport is located near the village and serves the city of Tambov and the surrounding area.

== Population ==
The 2020 Russian census recorded a population of 4,676 inhabitants in Donskoye.

According to the 2002 census, ethnic Russians accounted for 98% of the village's population.

== History ==
Donskoye is an old settlement whose origins are associated with the construction of the Tambov defensive line and the foundation of the Tambov fortress in the 17th century. The settlement was historically known by the names Pyashkilskaya Sloboda and Donskaya Sloboda. The former name derived from the Pyashkil stream, which flows through the settlement and empties into the Tsna; the latter reflected the settlement's association with Don Cossacks, who were among its early inhabitants.

The earliest documentary reference currently cited is a census of 1696, in which the settlement appears as Pyashkilskaya Sloboda. Later records continued to use that name for the settlement for much of the 18th and 19th centuries, although Donskaya Sloboda was also used.

By the late 17th century the settlement was already an established Cossack community. Its position near Tambov and on the road linking Tambov with Morshansk also contributed to the development of transport and trade.

== Education ==
A parish school was established in Donskoye in 1876. After the Russian Revolution it became a primary school; in 1931 it was reorganised as a seven-year school, and in 1960 as an eight-year school. A new two-storey school building was completed in 1967.

== Religion ==
The religious history of Donskoye is closely associated with Pitirim of Tambov, bishop of Tambov from 1686 to 1697. According to the tradition preserved by the Tambov Diocese, Pitirim made an early missionary visit to Pyashkilskaya Sloboda and, with the inhabitants' support, established a church dedicated to John the Baptist. The Tambov Diocese identifies the Predtechenskaya church in Pyashkilskaya Sloboda as one of the early churches associated with Pitirim and records a wooden cross presented to the church by him in 1687.

The original church was rebuilt in the late 18th century. In 1870 construction began on a new wooden church, which was consecrated in 1871 in honour of the Beheading of John the Baptist. A parish school and parish trusteeship were associated with the church, and a temperance society was established there in 1893.

The church was closed in 1939 by a decision of a special commission of the Presidium of the Supreme Soviet of the Russian SFSR for Tambov Oblast. The building was subsequently demolished, with its materials intended for use in the construction of a school.

Construction of a new Church of John the Baptist began in September 2002. The new church was consecrated on 25 November 2008 by Theodosius, Bishop of Tambov and Michurinsk.

== Transport ==
Tambov Donskoye Airport is located near the village and is the principal airport serving Tambov.
