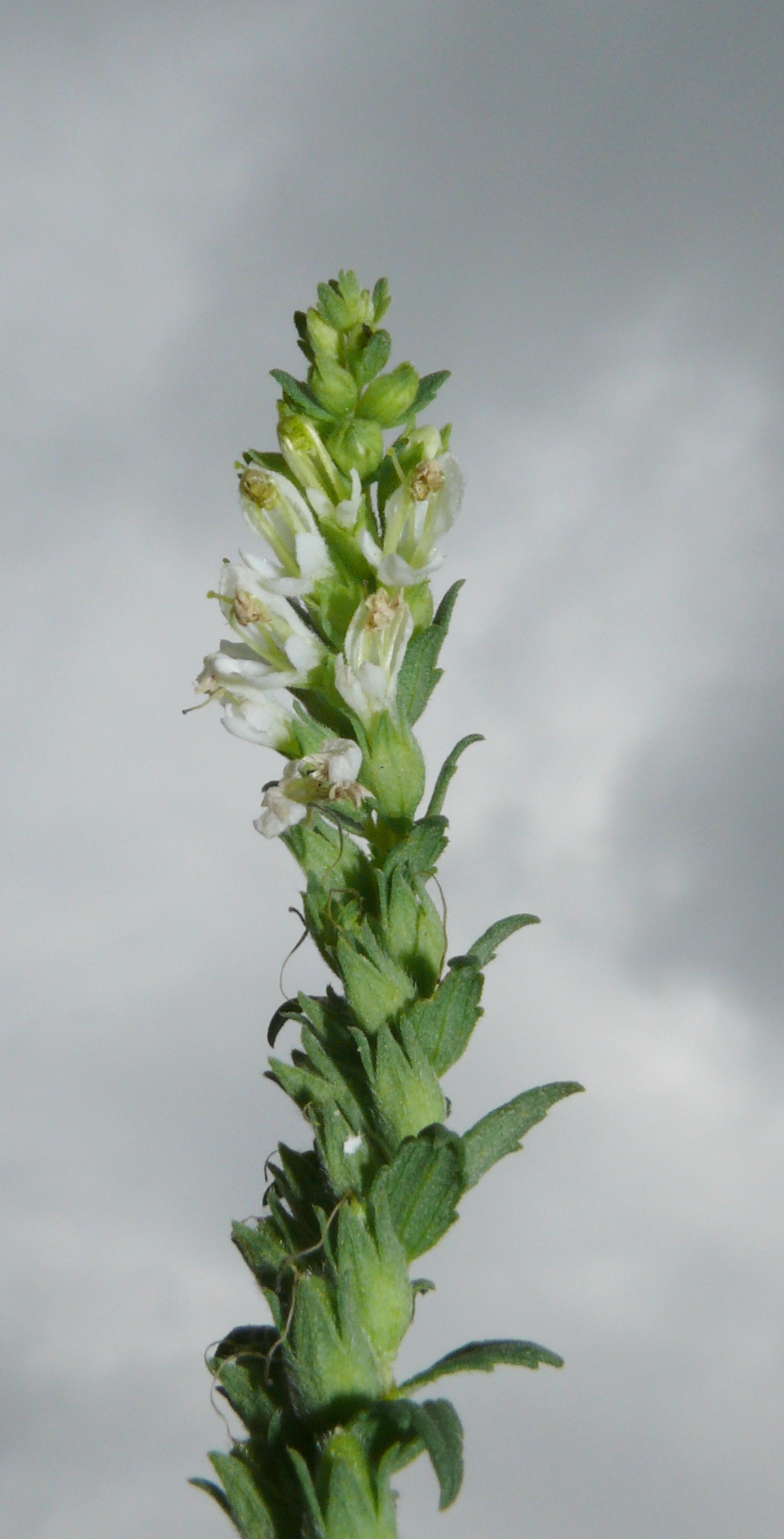

Scientific classification
- Kingdom: Plantae
- Clade: Tracheophytes
- Clade: Angiosperms
- Clade: Eudicots
- Clade: Asterids
- Order: Lamiales
- Family: Orobanchaceae
- Genus: Odontites
- Species: O. vulgaris

Binomial name
- Odontites vulgaris Moench

= Odontites vulgaris =

Species of flowering plant

Odontites vulgaris is a species of flowering plant belonging to the family Orobanchaceae.

Its native range is Europe to Siberia and China.
