= Kochubeyevsky District =

Kochubeyevsky District Кочубеевский район (Russian)
- District
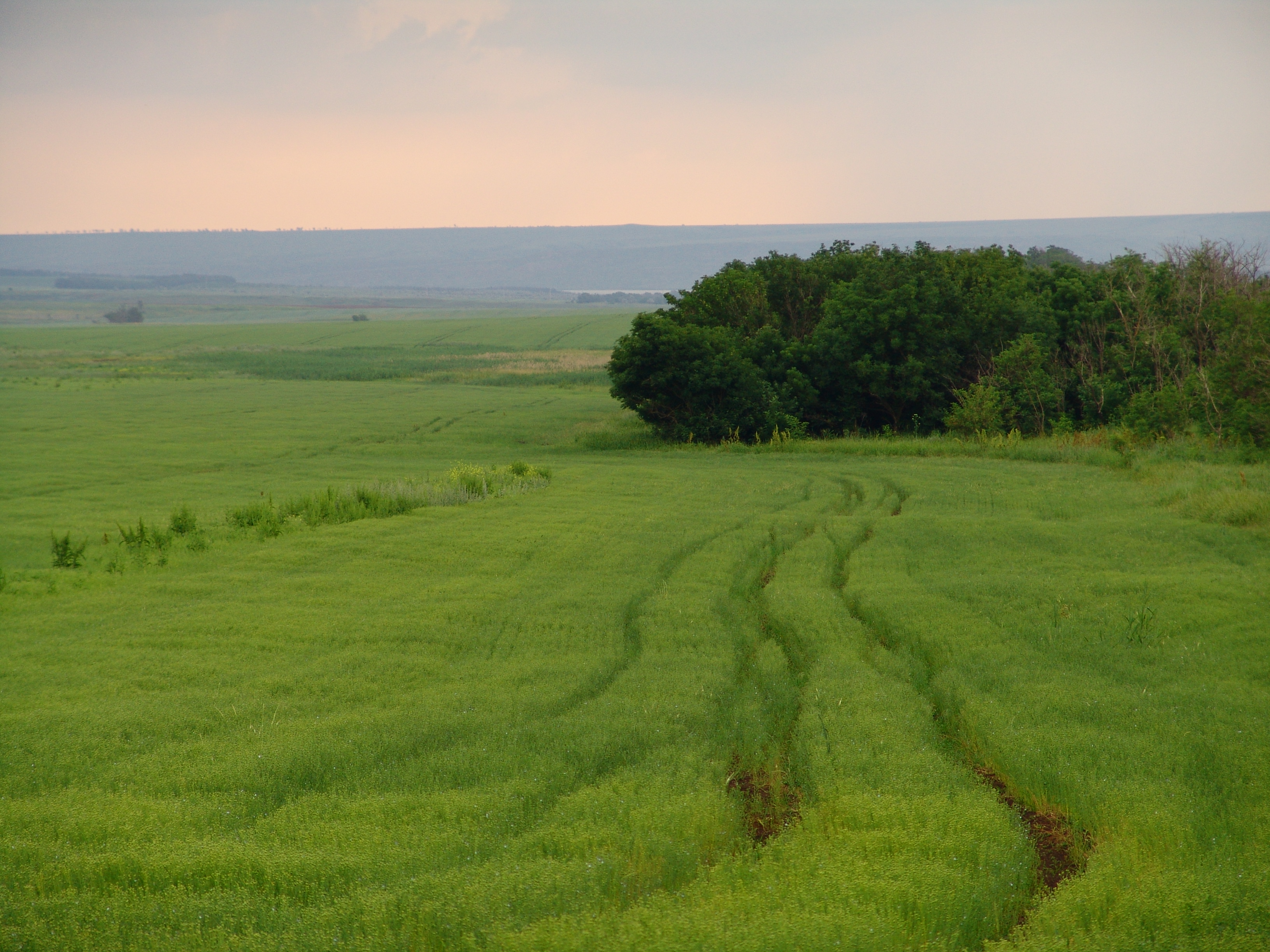
- Flax field, Kochubeyevsky District

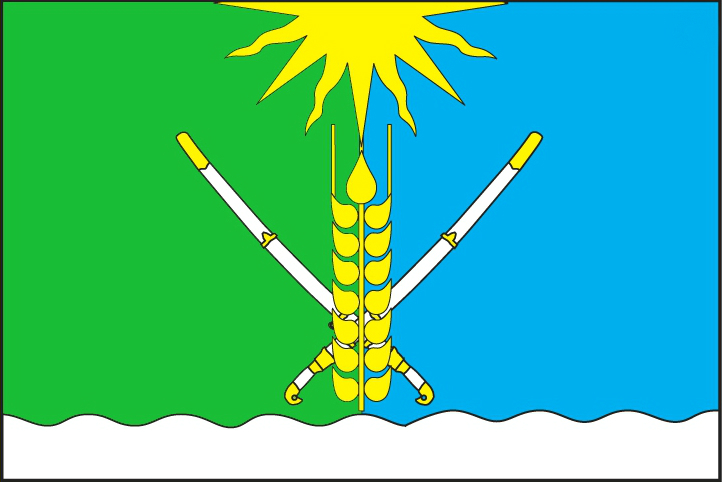
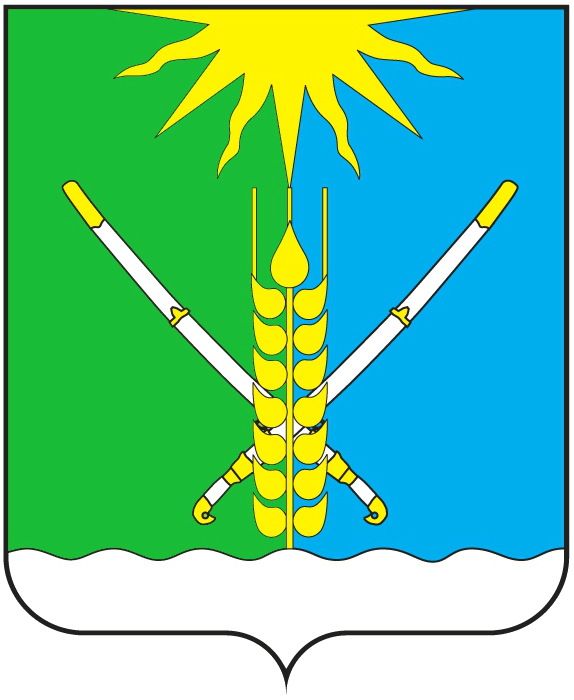
- Flag Coat of arms
- Location of Kochubeyevsky District in Stavropol Krai
- Coordinates: 44°40′N 41°50′E
- Country: Russia
- Federal subject: Stavropol Krai
- Established: 2 June 1924
- Administrative center: Kochubeyevskoye

Area
  - Total: 2,363 km^{2} (912 sq mi)

Population (2010 Census)
  - Total: 79,557
  - Density: 33.67/km^{2} (87.20/sq mi)
  - Urban: 0%
  - Rural: 100%

Administrative structure
  - Administrative divisions: 13 selsoviet
  - Inhabited localities: 51 rural localities

Municipal structure
  - Municipally incorporated as: Kochubeyevsky Municipal District
  - Municipal divisions: 0 urban settlements, 15 rural settlements
- Time zone: UTC+3 (MSK)
- OKTMO ID: 07628000
- Website: http://www.akmr-kochubeevskoe.ru

Kochubeyevsky District (Russian: Кочубе́евский райо́н) is an administrative district (raion), one of the twenty-six in Stavropol Krai, Russia. Municipally, it is incorporated as Kochubeyevsky Municipal District. It is located in the southwest of the krai. The area of the district is 2,363 square kilometers (912 sq mi). Its administrative center is the rural locality (a selo) of Kochubeyevskoye. Population: 79,557 (2010 census); 81,609 (2002 Census); 69,512 (1989 Census). The population of Kochubeyevskoye accounts for 33.7% of the district's total population.
