= Donskoy, Kalachyovsky District, Volgograd Oblast =

Donskoy Донской
- Settlement
- Location within Volgograd Oblast Location within Russia
- Coordinates: 48°29′N 43°27′E
- Country: Russia
- Region: Volgograd Oblast
- District: Kalachyovsky District
- Time zone: UTC+4:00

Donskoy (Russian: Донской) is a rural locality (a settlement) in Lyapichevskoye Rural Settlement, Kalachyovsky District, Volgograd Oblast, Russia. The population was 612 as of 2010. There are 13 streets.

== Geography ==
Donskoy is located 65 km southwest of Kalach-na-Donu (the district's administrative centre) by road. Lyapichev is the nearest rural locality.
