= Arzgir =

Arzgir Арзгир
- Selo
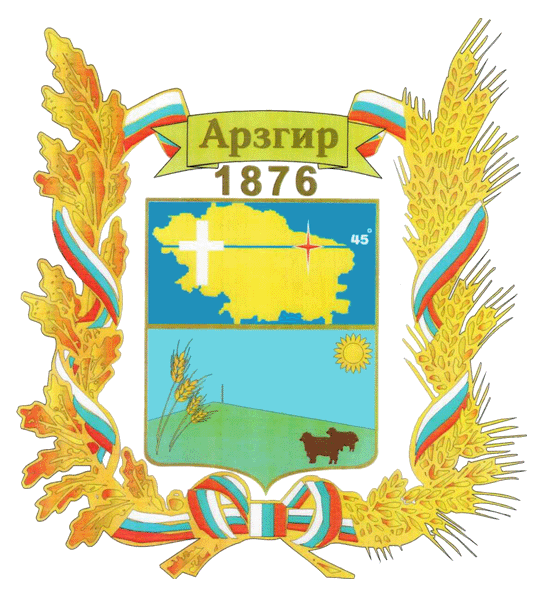
- Coat of arms
- Interactive map of Arzgir
- Location of Arzgir Arzgir (Stavropol Krai)
- Coordinates: 45°22′10″N 44°13′41″E
- Country: Russia
- Federal subject: Stavropol Krai
- Administrative district: Arzgirsky District
- SettlementSelsoviet: Arzgir Settlement
- Founded: 7 August 1876 (Julian)
- Elevation: 67 m (220 ft)

Population (2010 Census)
  - Total: 14,722
  - Estimate (2021): 13,160 (−10.6%)

Administrative status
  - Capital of: Arzgirsky District, Arzgir Settlement

Municipal status
  - Municipal district: Arzgirsky Municipal District
  - Rural settlement: Arzgirsky Selsoviet Rural Settlement
  - Capital of: Arzgirsky Municipal District, Arzgirsky Selsoviet Rural Settlement
- Time zone: UTC+3 (MSK)
- Postal code: 356570–356571
- OKTMO ID: 07607402101

Arzgir (Russian: Арзгир) is a rural locality (a selo) and the administrative center of Arzgirsky District of Stavropol Krai, Russia. Population: 14,722 (2010 census); 15,559 (2002 census); 15,307 (1989 Soviet census).
