= Yessentukskaya =

Rural locality in Stavropol Krai, Russia

Coordinates: 44°01′43″N 42°52′33″E

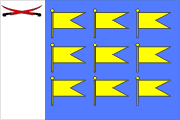
Flag of Yessentukskaya

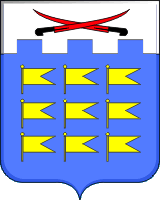
Coat of Arms of Yessentukskaya

Yessentukskaya (Russian: Ессентукская, Greek: Γιεσσεντούσκαγια) is a rural locality stanitsa) and the administrative center of Predgorny District, Stavropol Krai, Russia. Population: 20,166 (2010 census); 19,604 (2002 census); 14,424 (1989 Soviet census).
