= Dimitri Donskoj (film) =

1909 film directed by Kai Hansen

- Russian: Эпизод из жизни Дмитрия Донского
- Directed by: Kai Hansen
- Starring: Vladimir Karin; I. Langfeld; Matveieff; Nina Rutkovskaia; Voinoff
- Release date: 1909
- Country: Russian Empire

Dimitri Donskoj (Russian: Эпизод из жизни Дмитрия Донского) is a 1909 Russian short film directed by Kai Hansen.

== Starring ==
- Vladimir Karin as The farmer's son
- I. Langfeld as The farmer
- Matveieff as Dimitry Donskoy
- Nina Rutkovskaia as The young girl
- Voinoff
