= Donskoy, Gorodishchensky District, Volgograd Oblast =

Donskoy Донской
- Khutor
- Location within Volgograd Oblast Location within Russia
- Coordinates: 48°59′N 43°58′E
- Country: Russia
- Region: Volgograd Oblast
- District: Gorodishchensky District
- Time zone: UTC+4:00

Donskoy (Russian: Донской) is a rural locality (a khutor) in Panshinskoye Rural Settlement, Gorodishchensky District, Volgograd Oblast, Russia. The population was 137 as of 2010. There are 10 streets.

== Geography ==
Donskoy is located in steppe, 3 km from the left bank of the Don River, 63 km northwest of Gorodishche (the district's administrative centre) by road. Nizhnegerasimovsky is the nearest rural locality.
