= Turkmensky District =

Turkmensky District Туркменский район (Russian)
- District
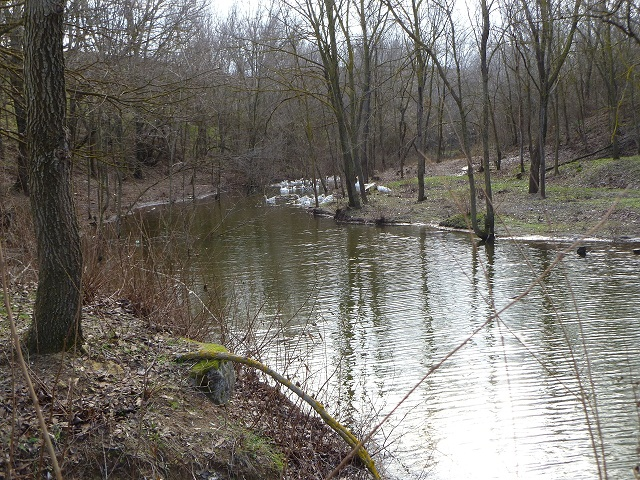
- A pond in the vicinity of the selo of Malye Yagury in Turkmensky District

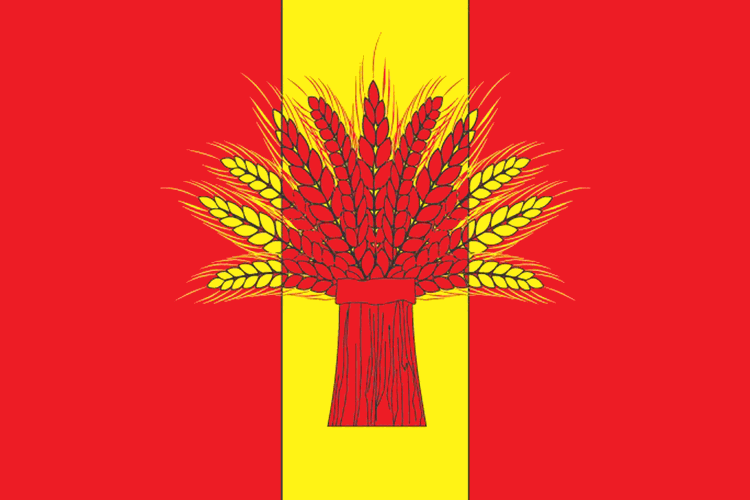
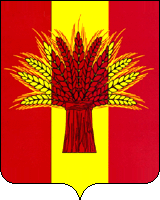
- Flag Coat of arms
- Location of Turkmensky District in Stavropol Krai
- Coordinates: 45°26′N 43°27′E
- Country: Russia
- Federal subject: Stavropol Krai
- Established: 1925
- Administrative center: Letnyaya Stavka

Area
  - Total: 2,612 km^{2} (1,008 sq mi)

Population (2010 Census)
  - Total: 25,948
  - Density: 9.934/km^{2} (25.73/sq mi)
  - Urban: 0%
  - Rural: 100%

Administrative structure
  - Administrative divisions: 8 Selsoviets
  - Inhabited localities: 25 rural localities

Municipal structure
  - Municipally incorporated as: Turkmensky Municipal District
  - Municipal divisions: 0 urban settlements, 11 rural settlements
- Time zone: UTC+3 (MSK)
- OKTMO ID: 07656000
- Website: http://www.turkmensky.ru/

Turkmensky District (Russian: Туркме́нский райо́н) is one of the twenty-six raions in the north of Stavropol Krai, Russia. Municipally, it is incorporated as Turkmensky Municipal District. The district was named for its significant Turkmen population, although it is not a majority. The area of the district is 2,612 square kilometers (1,008 sq mi). Turkmensky's administrative center is the rural locality of Letnyaya Stavka. In 2010, the population was 25,948. The population of Letnyaya Stavka accounts for 17.1% of Turkmensky's total population.

== Demographics ==
=== Population ===
- 25,948 (2010 census);
- 28,405 (2002 Census);
- 27,070 (1989 Census)

=== Ethnic groups ===
Ethnic Groups of Turkmensky District (2010)
Group	Population	Percent
Russian	16,155	62.26%
Turkmen	5,043	19.44%
Dargin	1,527	5.88%
Tatar	1,425	5.49%
Armenian	380	1.46%
Avar	186	0.72%
Romani	152	0.59%
Ukrainian	109	0.42%
Others	842	3.24%
Not Reported	129	0.50%
Total	25,948	100.00%
