= Chur, Kurdistan =

Chur چور
- Village
- Location within Iran
- Coordinates: 35°25′18″N 46°18′33″E
- Country: Iran
- Province: Kurdistan
- County: Marivan
- Bakhsh: Central
- Rural District: Sarkal

Population (2006)
  - Total: 617
- Time zone: UTC+3:30 (IRST)
  - Summer (DST): UTC+4:30 (IRDT)

Chur (Persian: چور, also Romanized as Chūr) is a village in Sarkal Rural District, in the Central District of Marivan County, Kurdistan Province, Iran. At the 2006 census, its population was 617, in 151 families. The village is populated by Kurds.
