= Letnyaya Stavka =

Rural locality in Stavropol Krai, Russia

Coordinates: 45°25′50″N 43°26′35″E

Letnyaya Stavka (Russian: Летняя Ставка) is a rural locality (a selo) and the administrative center of Turkmensky District, Stavropol Krai, Russia. Population: 4,437 (2010 census); 4,881 (2002 census); 4,508 (1989 Soviet census).
