= Donskaya =

Donskaya Донская
- Village
- Location within Irkutsk Oblast Location within Russia
- Coordinates: 53°24′N 103°28′E
- Country: Russia
- Region: Irkutsk Oblast
- District: Bokhansky District
- Time zone: UTC+8:00

Donskaya (Russian: Донская) is a rural locality (a village) in Bokhansky District, Irkutsk Oblast, Russia. Population: 128 (2010 census);

== Geography ==
This rural locality is located 35 kilometres (22 mi) from Bokhan (the district's administrative centre), 136 kilometres (85 mi) from Irkutsk (capital of Irkutsk Oblast) and 4,373 kilometres (2,717 mi) from Moscow. Mutinova is the nearest rural locality.
