= Kursavka =

Kursavka Курсавка
- Selo
- Interactive map of Kursavka
- Location of Kursavka Kursavka (Stavropol Krai)
- Coordinates: 44°27′N 42°30′E
- Country: Russia
- Federal subject: Stavropol Krai
- Administrative district: Andropovsky District
- Founded: 1875

Population (2010 Census)
  - Total: 11,830
  - Estimate (2021): 11,517 (−2.6%)

Administrative status
  - Capital of: Andropovsky District
- Time zone: UTC+3 (MSK)
- Postal code: 357070
- OKTMO ID: 07632410101

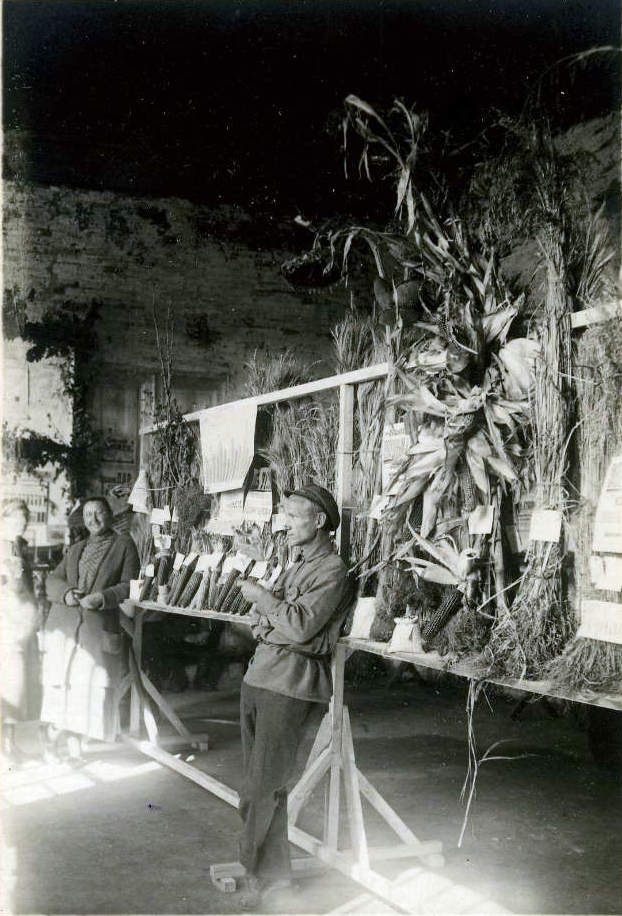
Field department. Kursavka village, Stavropol district, 1926

Kursavka (Russian: Курсавка) is a rural locality (a selo) and the administrative center of Andropovsky District in Stavropol Krai, Russia. Population: 11,830 (2010 census); 10,848 (2002 census); 9,625 (1989 Soviet census).
