= Donskoye, Stavropol Krai =

Donskoye Донское
- Selo
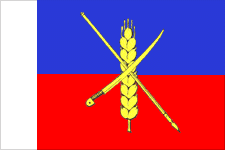
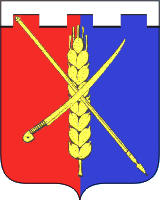
- Flag Coat of arms
- Interactive map of Donskoye
- Location of Donskoye Donskoye (Stavropol Krai)
- Coordinates: 45°27′N 41°59′E
- Country: Russia
- Federal subject: Stavropol Krai
- Administrative district: Trunovsky District
- Founded: 1777

Population (2010 Census)
  - Total: 14,927
  - Estimate (2021): 14,338 (−3.9%)

Administrative status
  - Capital of: Trunovsky District
- Time zone: UTC+3 (MSK)
- Postal code: 356170–356173
- OKTMO ID: 07654404101

Donskoye (Russian: Донское) is a rural locality (a selo) and the administrative center of Trunovsky District in Stavropol Krai, Russia. Population: 14,927 (2010 census); 15,196 (2002 census); 13,529 (1989 Soviet census).

The village was founded in 1777 and has a population of 14,338 people as of 2021. With an area of 15.00 km^{2}, the population density is 955.87 people per km^{2}. The village has developed infrastructure, with a House of Culture "Victory", Intersettlement Central Library, Children's library, Museum of History and Local Lore, Sports Association, Central Regional Hospital, Pravoegorlyksky watering and irrigation canal, apartment buildings, house of life, house of justice, park recreation area, fire department, two cemeteries, and a well-developed street lighting system. The village is also home to several monuments, including a mass grave of civilians shot by the Nazis, a monument to Lenin, a memorial sign at the site of the St. Petersburg-Tiflis postal route, and a memorial sign on the western corner of the earthen rampart of the Don Fortress.

== History ==
Donskoye, a rural locality located in Stavropol Krai, Russia was founded in 1777 on the site of the Donskaya fortress, which was part of the Azov-Mozdok military defense line.

=== Foundation and early history: The Village of Donskaya ===
The village of Donskaya was founded in 1777 and was named after the Donskaya fortress. The Astrakhan governor-General I. V. Yakobi received a warrant from Prince Potemkin to call the village “Donskaya”. In 1777, the Khoper Cossacks were transferred to the village from the Don. From 1801, peasants and working people from the Orel, Kursk, Voronezh, Kaluga, Ryazan, Kharkiv, and Chernigov provinces were settled at the fortress. The local museum has several historical artifacts, including a safe of the Khoper regiment and a blueprint of the Donskaya fortress plan.

=== 19th century: Relocation and Population Growth ===
In 1826, the village of Donskaya was relocated to the border of the Caucasian region and in its place, a new village was formed in 1827. By 1839, the population of the village had grown to over 1,000 people, with the majority of residents professing the Orthodox faith. There was also a community of Old Believers. In 1841, the construction of the Michael-Arkhangelsk stone church was finally completed, although it was later demolished in 1935. The population of the village continued to grow and by 1869 it had reached over 5,000 people.

=== Infrastructure Development ===
In 1864, a steam-powered flour mill was built in Donskoye. The Donsko-Alexander one-class school was founded in 1872. By 1893, the village had both a parochial school and a school of the Ministry of Education. In 1898, a library was opened at the Donsko-Alexandrovsky School, serving around 180 people a year. In February 1902, a savings bank was opened, followed by a post and telegraph office in 1908. In 1915, the People's House was opened in Donskoye, with a library where concerts and amateur performances were held.

==== Agricultural and Meliorative Partnerships ====
In 1922, the Rodnik meliorative partnership was established in the village, followed by the Egorlyk agricultural partnership and the Donskoy Vodoprovod meliorative partnership in 1924.

=== Administrative Center ===
Starting from the first half of the 1920s, Donskoye became the administrative center of the Donskoy Village Council of the Moskovsky District of the Stavropol District. According to the "List of populated places of the North Caucasus Territory" for 1925, the village had 1669 households, with 2 party organizations, 4 elementary schools, and 2 libraries. 25 small enterprises, including 10 forges, 7 mills, and an oil mill, operated on the territory of Donskoye.

=== Great Patriotic War ===
During the Great Patriotic War, the village was under German occupation from August 3, 1942, to January 21, 1943. On January 19, 1943, the village was liberated from the Nazi invaders.

=== Post-War Developments ===
In 1970, the Trunovsky district was restored, and since 1971, the administrative center of the district was the village of Donskoy Village Council

== Demography ==
The population of Donskoye, Stavropol Krai, according to the results of the 2010 census, was 14,927 people. The gender composition of the population showed that there were 6,885 men (46.12%) and 8,042 women (53.88%).

Historical population
| Year | Pop. | ±% |
|---|---|---|
| 1901 | 8,387 | — |
| 1903 | 9,585 | +14.3% |
| 1925 | 9,833 | +2.6% |
| 1926 | 11,255 | +14.5% |
| 1979 | 9,800 | −12.9% |
| 1989 | 13,529 | +38.1% |
| 2002 | 15,196 | +12.3% |
| 2010 | 14,927 | −1.8% |
| 2014 | 14,700 | −1.5% |
| 2019 | 13,663 | −7.1% |
| 2020 | 13,116 | −4.0% |
| 2021 | 14,338 | +9.3% |

=== National composition ===
| Nationality | Population | Percentage of Population (2001 Census) |
|---|---|---|
| Russians | 12,763 | 85.50% |
| Armenians | 944 | 6.32% |
| Gypsies | 162 | 1.09% |
| Others | 1058 | 7.09% |
| Total | 14,927 | 100.00% |

==== Others ====
- Azerbaijanis (79)
- Belarusians (38)
- Georgians (16)
- Dargins (68)
- Yezidis (93)
- Kazakhs (12)
- Karachays (50)
- Koreans (20)
- Kumyks (19)
- Laks ( 10)
- Lezgins (31)
- Moldovans (6)
- Mordovians (16)
- Germans (40)
- Ossetians (18)
- Tabasarans (8)
- Tatars (33)
- Udins (12)
- Udmurts (8)
- Uzbeks ( 6)
- Ukrainians (148)
- Chechens (35)
- Chuvashs (22)
- who gave other answers about nationality (43)
- did not indicate nationality (227)
