= Donskoy (surname) =

Donskoy is a Russian surname. Notable people with this surname include:

- Alexander Donskoy (born 1970), mayor of Arkhangelsk, Russia
- Boris Donskoy (1894 or 1896–1918), Russian revolutionary
- Dmitry Donskoy (1350–1389), Grand Prince of Moscow (1359–1389) and Grand Prince of Vladimir (1363–1389)
- Evgeny Donskoy (born 1990), Russian professional tennis player
- Joonas Donskoi (born 1992), Finnish professional ice hockey player
- Mark Donskoy (1906–1985), Soviet film director
- Mikhail Donskoy (1948–2009), Soviet and Russian computer scientist
