= Neftekumsky District =

Neftekumsky District Нефтекумский район (Russian)
- District
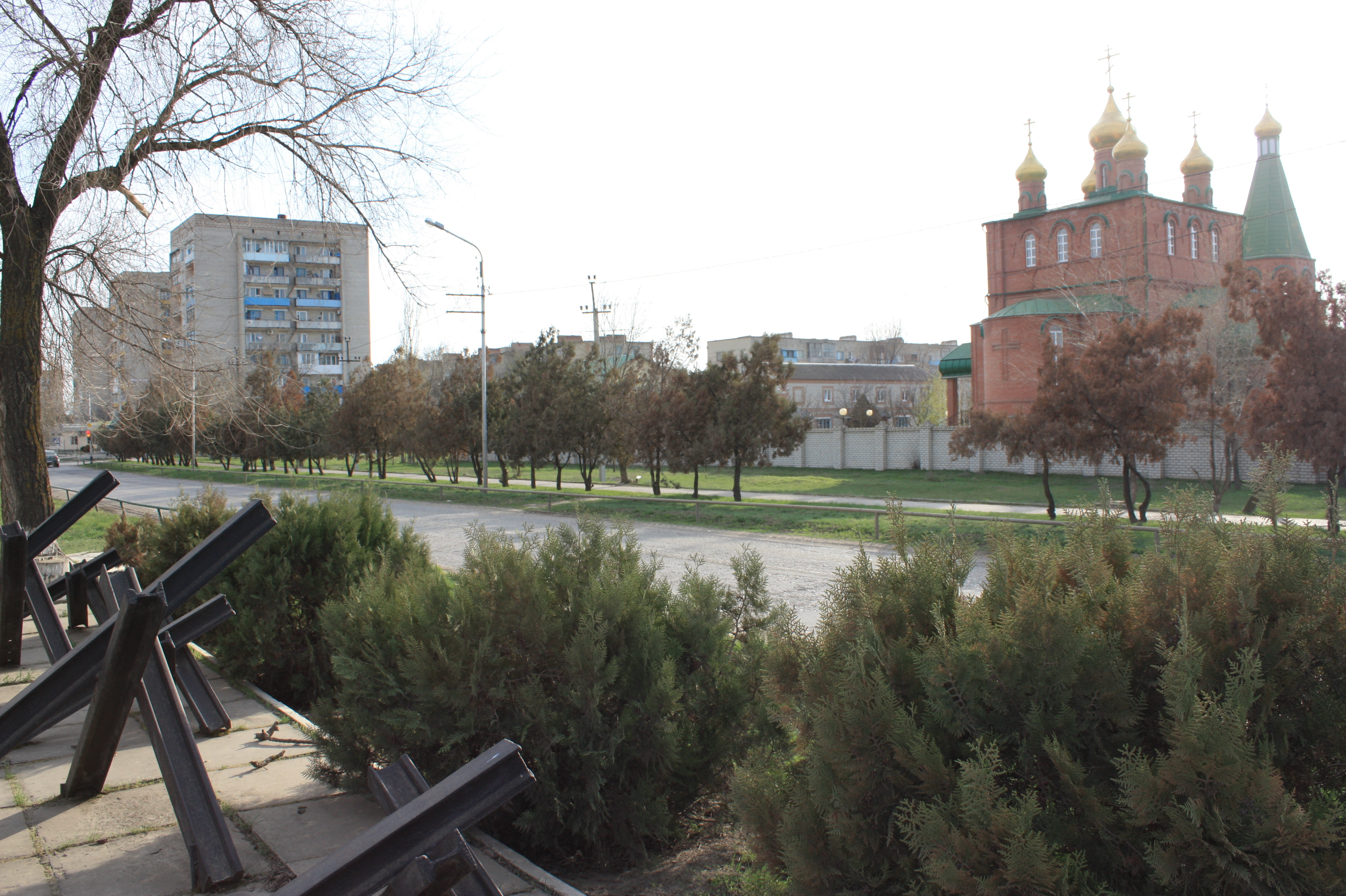
- Neftekumsk, Neftekumsky District

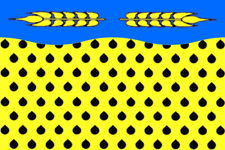
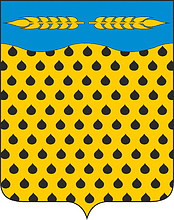
- Flag Coat of arms
- Location of Neftekumsky District in Stavropol Krai
- Coordinates: 44°45′N 44°59′E
- Country: Russia
- Federal subject: Stavropol Krai
- Established: 30 September 1920
- Administrative center: Neftekumsk

Area
  - Total: 3,797 km^{2} (1,466 sq mi)

Population (2010 Census)
  - Total: 68,778
  - Density: 18.11/km^{2} (46.91/sq mi)
  - Urban: 51.4%
  - Rural: 48.6%

Administrative structure
  - Administrative divisions: 1 Towns, 1 Settlements, 9 Selsoviets
  - Inhabited localities: 1 cities/towns, 1 urban-type settlements, 23 rural localities

Municipal structure
  - Municipally incorporated as: Neftekumsky Municipal District
  - Municipal divisions: 2 urban settlements, 10 rural settlements
- Time zone: UTC+3 (MSK)
- OKTMO ID: 07641000
- Website: http://www.anmr-neftekumsk.ru

Neftekumsky District (Russian: Нефтеку́мский райо́н) is an administrative district (raion), one of the twenty-six in Stavropol Krai, Russia. Municipally, it is incorporated as Neftekumsky Municipal District. It is located in the east of the krai. The area of the district is 3,797 square kilometers (1,466 sq mi). Its administrative center is the town of Neftekumsk. Population: 68,778 (2010 census); 70,902 (2002 Census); 59,775 (1989 Census). The population of Neftekumsk accounts for 40.3% of the district's total population.
