= Neftekumsk =

Neftekumsk Нефтекумск
- Town
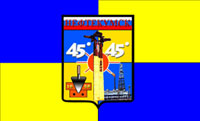
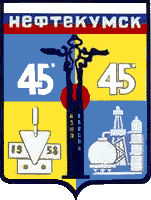
- Flag Coat of arms
- Interactive map of Neftekumsk
- Location of Neftekumsk Neftekumsk (Stavropol Krai)
- Coordinates: 44°47′N 44°46′E
- Country: Russia
- Federal subject: Stavropol Krai
- Administrative district: Neftekumsky District
- TownSelsoviet: Neftekumsk
- Founded: 1961
- Town status since: 1968
- Elevation: 40 m (130 ft)

Population (2010 Census)
  - Total: 27,687
  - Estimate (2023): 23,075 (−16.7%)

Administrative status
  - Capital of: Neftekumsky District, Town of Neftekumsk

Municipal status
  - Municipal district: Neftekumsky Municipal District
  - Urban settlement: Neftekumsk Urban Settlement
  - Capital of: Neftekumsky Municipal District, Neftekumsk Urban Settlement
- Time zone: UTC+3 (MSK)
- Postal code: 356880
- OKTMO ID: 07641101001
- Website: www.neftekumsk.com

Neftekumsk (Russian: Нефтеку́мск) is a town and the administrative center of Neftekumsky District in Stavropol Krai, Russia, located on the right bank of the Kuma River, 305 kilometers (190 mi) east of Stavropol, the administrative center of the krai. Population: 27,687 (2010 census); 27,395 (2002 census); 22,092 (1989 Soviet census).

== History ==
It was founded in 1961 as an oil-extracting settlement. It was granted urban-type settlement status in 1962 and town status in 1968.

== Administrative and municipal status ==
Within the framework of administrative divisions, Neftekumsk serves as the administrative center of Neftekumsky District. As an administrative division, it is incorporated within Neftekumsky District as the Town of Neftekumsk. As a municipal division, the Town of Neftekumsk is incorporated within Neftekumsky Municipal District as Neftekumsk Urban Settlement.

== Climate ==
Climate data for Neftekumsk
Month	Jan	Feb	Mar	Apr	May	Jun	Jul	Aug	Sep	Oct	Nov	Dec	Year
Mean daily maximum °C (°F)	−0.3 (31.5)	0.7 (33.3)	6.6 (43.9)	16.9 (62.4)	23.7 (74.7)	28.1 (82.6)	30.6 (87.1)	29.8 (85.6)	23.6 (74.5)	15.5 (59.9)	7.8 (46.0)	2.4 (36.3)	15.5 (59.8)
Mean daily minimum °C (°F)	−7.1 (19.2)	−6.8 (19.8)	−1.7 (28.9)	5.1 (41.2)	11.4 (52.5)	15.9 (60.6)	18.5 (65.3)	17.4 (63.3)	11.9 (53.4)	5.4 (41.7)	0.5 (32.9)	−3.7 (25.3)	5.6 (42.0)
Average precipitation mm (inches)	18 (0.7)	18 (0.7)	20 (0.8)	25 (1.0)	39 (1.5)	49 (1.9)	41 (1.6)	39 (1.5)	26 (1.0)	20 (0.8)	23 (0.9)	23 (0.9)	341 (13.3)
Source: Climate-Data.org
