= Trunovsky District =

Trunovsky District Труновский район
- District
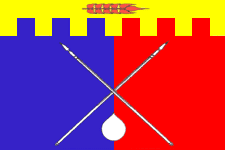
- Flag Coat of arms
- Location of Trunovsky District in Stavropol Krai
- Coordinates: 45°27′N 41°59′E
- Country: Russia
- Federal subject: Stavropol Krai
- Established: 1935
- Administrative center: Donskoye

Area
  - Total: 1,686 km^{2} (651 sq mi)

Population (2010 Census)
  - Total: 34,558
  - Density: 20.50/km^{2} (53.09/sq mi)
  - Urban: 0%
  - Rural: 100%

Administrative structure
  - Administrative divisions: 4 Selsoviets
  - Inhabited localities: 15 rural localities

Municipal structure
  - Municipally incorporated as: Trunovsky Municipal District
  - Municipal divisions: 0 urban settlements, 6 rural settlements
- Time zone: UTC+3 (MSK)
- OKTMO ID: 07654000
- Website: http://www.trunovskiy26raion.ru

Trunovsky District (Russian: Труно́вский райо́н) is an administrative district (raion), one of the twenty-six in Stavropol Krai, Russia. Municipally, it is incorporated as Trunovsky Municipal District. It is located in the northwest of the krai. The area of the district is 1,686 square kilometers (651 sq mi). Its administrative center is the rural locality (a selo) of Donskoye. Population: 34,558 (2010 Census); 35,403 (2002 Census); 32,093 (1989 Census). The population of Donskoye accounts for 43.2% of the district's total population.
