= Kochubeyevskoye =

Kochubeyevskoye Кочубеевское
- Selo
- Flag
- Interactive map of Kochubeyevskoye
- Location of Kochubeyevskoye Kochubeyevskoye (Stavropol Krai)
- Coordinates: 44°42′N 41°50′E
- Country: Russia
- Federal subject: Stavropol Krai
- Administrative district: Kochubeyevsky District
- Founded: 1866

Population (2010 Census)
  - Total: 26,835
  - Estimate (2021): 26,645 (−0.7%)

Administrative status
  - Capital of: Kochubeyevsky District

Municipal status
  - Municipal district: Kochubeyevsky Municipal District
  - Rural settlement: Kochubeyevskoye Rural Settlement
  - Capital of: Kochubeyevsky Municipal District, Kochubeyevskoye Rural Settlement
- Time zone: UTC+3 (MSK)
- Postal code: 357000–357002
- OKTMO ID: 07628422101
- Website: www.kochubeevka.ru

Kochubeyevskoye (Russian: Кочубе́евское) is a rural locality (a selo) and the administrative center of Kochubeyevsky District in Stavropol Krai, Russia, located on the Kuban River. Population: 26,835 (2010 census); 27,988 (2002 census); 22,211 (1989 Soviet census).
