= Grigoropolisskaya =

Grigoropolisskaya Григорополисская
- Stanitsa
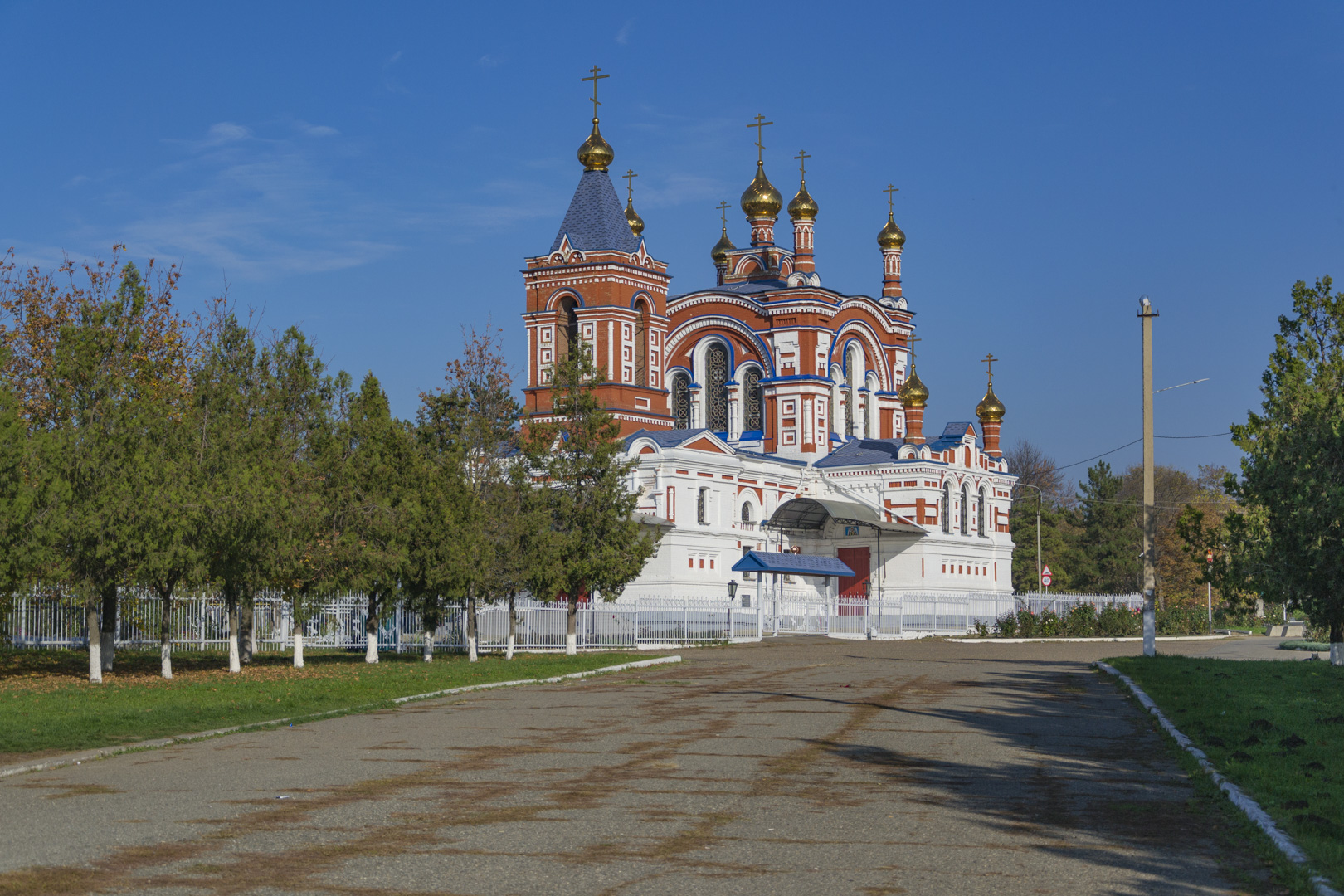
- Interactive map of Grigoropolisskaya
- Location of Grigoropolisskaya Grigoropolisskaya (Stavropol Krai)
- Coordinates: 45°17′44″N 41°03′41″E
- Country: Russia
- Federal subject: Stavropol Krai
- Administrative district: Novoalexandrovsky District
- Founded: 1794

Population (2010 Census)
  - Total: 8,988
  - Estimate (2023): 9,048 (+0.7%)
- Time zone: UTC+3 (MSK)
- Postal code: 356020
- OKTMO ID: 07643404101

Grigoropolisskaya (Russian: Григорополисская) is a rural locality (a stanitsa) in Novoalexandrovsky District of Stavropol Krai, Russia, located near the Kuban River. Population: 8,988 (2010 census); 9,146 (2002 census).
