= Andropovsky District =

Andropovsky District Андроповский район (Russian)
- District
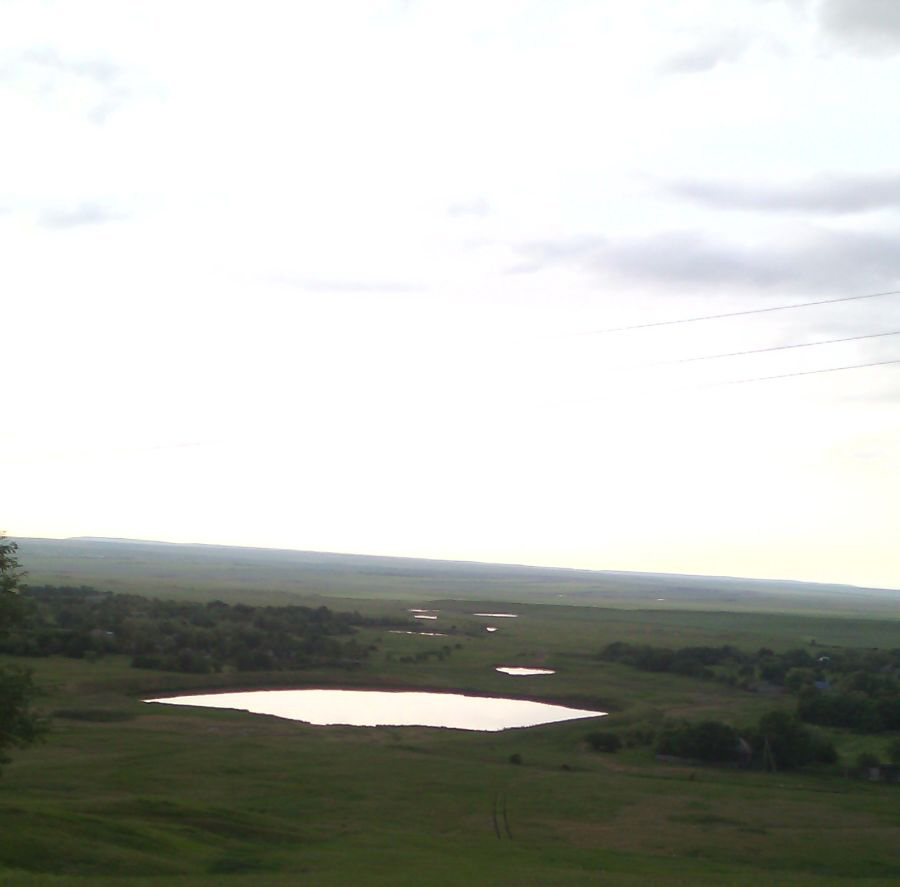
- Outskirts of Village Sultan, Andropovsky District

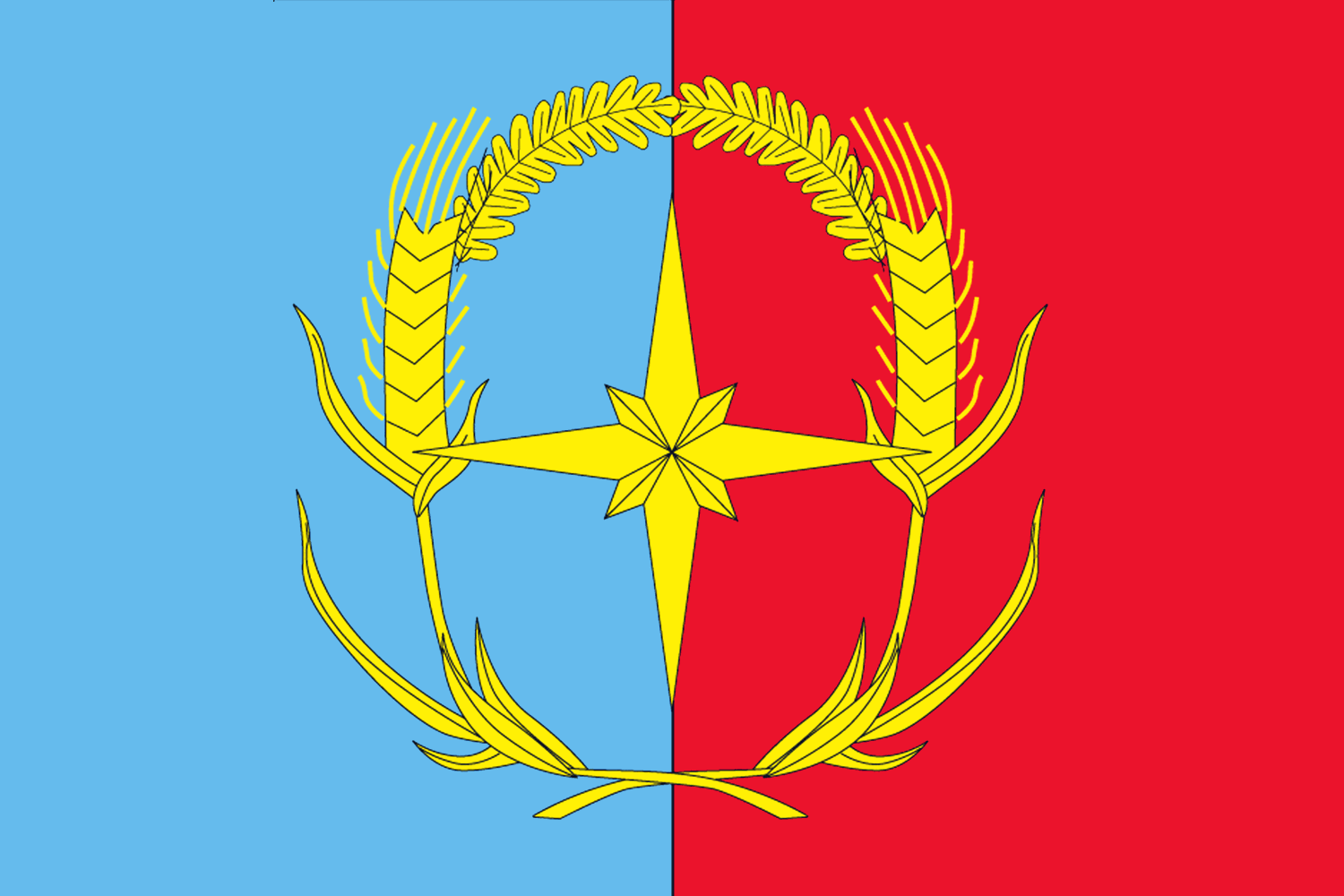
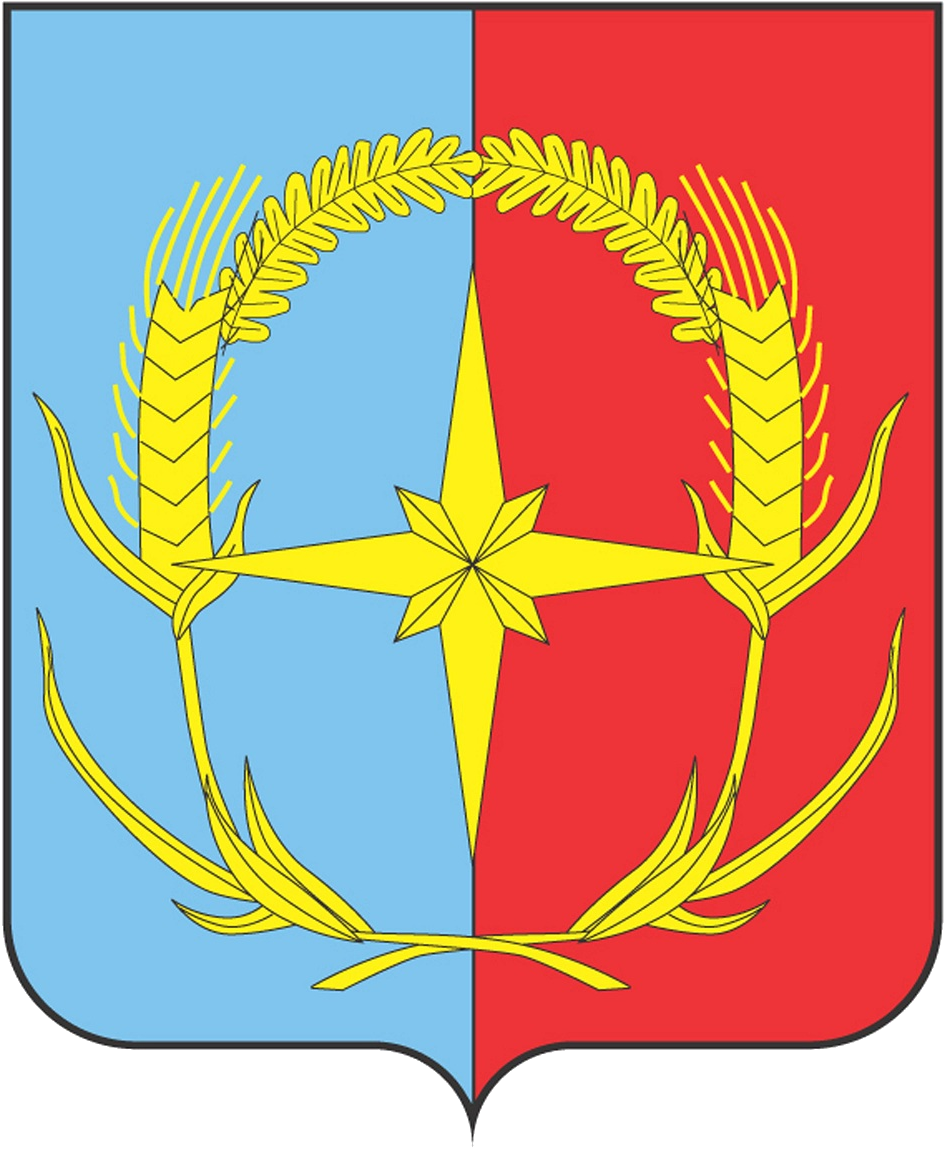
- Flag Coat of arms
- Location of Andropovsky District in Stavropol Krai
- Coordinates: 44°28′N 42°30′E
- Country: Russia
- Federal subject: Stavropol Krai
- Established: 1924
- Administrative center: Kursavka

Area
  - Total: 2,388 km^{2} (922 sq mi)

Population (2010 Census)
  - Total: 35,437
  - Density: 14.84/km^{2} (38.43/sq mi)
  - Urban: 0%
  - Rural: 100%

Administrative structure
  - Administrative divisions: 8 selsoviet
  - Inhabited localities: 29 rural localities

Municipal structure
  - Municipally incorporated as: Andropovsky Municipal District
  - Municipal divisions: 0 urban settlements, 11 rural settlements
- Time zone: UTC+3 (MSK)
- OKTMO ID: 07632000
- Website: http://andropovskiy.ru/

Andropovsky District (Russian: Андро́повский райо́н) is an administrative district (raion), one of the twenty-six in Stavropol Krai, Russia. Municipally, it is incorporated as Andropovsky Municipal District. It is located in the southwest of the krai. The area of the district is 2,388 square kilometers (922 sq mi). Its administrative center is the rural locality (a selo) of Kursavka. Population: 35,437 (2010 census); 35,670 (2002 Census); 32,216 (1989 Census). The population of Kursavka accounts for 33.4% of the district's total population.
