= Stavropol constituency =

Russian legislative constituency

Stavropol single-member constituency
- Constituency of the Russian State Duma

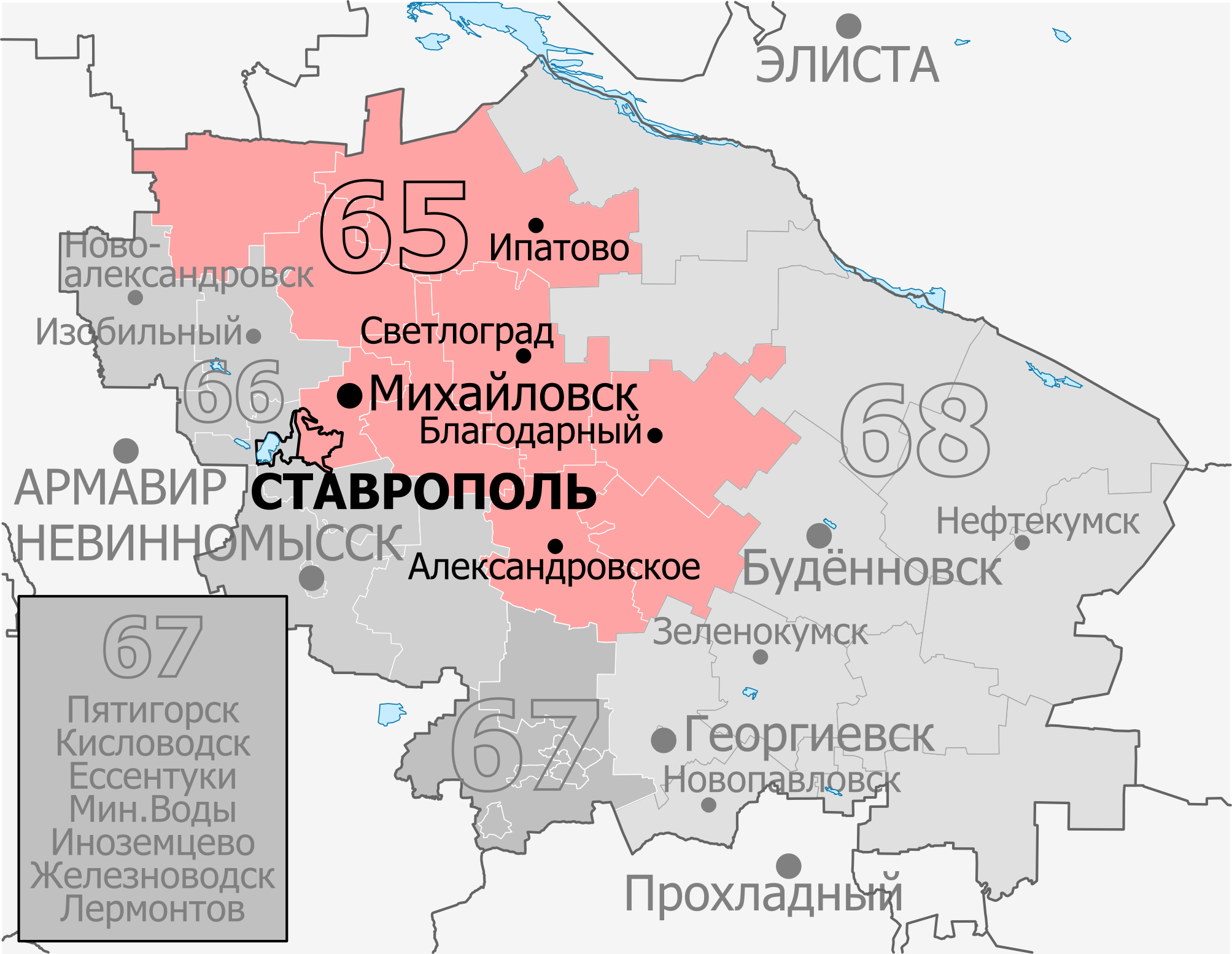
- Constituency boundaries since 2016
- Deputy: Olga Kazakova; United Russia
- Federal subject: Stavropol Krai
- Districts: Alexandrovsky, Blagodarnensky, Grachyovsky, Ipatovsky, Krasnogvardeysky, Novoselitsky, Petrovsky, Shpakovsky (Dubovsky, Kazinsky, Mikhaylovsk, Nadezhdinsky, Pelaginsky), Stavropol (Leninsky, Oktyabrsky), Trunovsky
- Voters: 490,572 (2026)

The Stavropol constituency (No.69 (Note: No.56 in 1993–1995, No.55 in 1995–2003, No.57 in 2003–2007, No.65 in 2016–2026)) is a Russian legislative constituency in Stavropol Krai. The constituency covers eastern Stavropol and central Stavropol Krai.

The constituency has been represented since 2026 by United Russia deputy Olga Kazakova, four-term State Duma member and former regional Minister of Culture, who won the open seat, succeeding two-term United Russia incumbent Mikhail Kuzmin. Kazakova has chaired the Duma Committee on Culture since September 2024.

== Boundaries ==
1993–2007: Kochubeyevsky District, Nevinnomyssk, Shpakovsky District, Stavropol
The constituency covered the krai capital of Stavropol and industrial city of Nevinnomyssk to the south as well as suburbs and exurbs of both cities.

2016–present: Alexandrovsky District, Blagodarnensky District, Grachyovsky District, Ipatovsky District, Krasnogvardeysky District, Novoselitsky District, Petrovsky District, Shpakovsky District (Dubovsky, Kazinsky, Mikhaylovsk, Nadezhdinsky, Pelaginsky), Stavropol (Leninsky, Oktyabrsky), Trunovsky District
The constituency was re-created for the 2016 election and it retained only eastern Stavropol and eastern Shpakovsky District, losing the rest of its former territory to new Nevinnomyssk constituency. This seat gained rural central Stavropol Krai from the dissolved Petrovsky constituency.

== Members elected ==
Election	Member	Party
1993	Aleksandr Traspov	Independent
1995	Vasily Iver	Communist Party
1999	Vasily Iver	Communist Party
2003	Anatoly Semenchenko	Independent
2007	Proportional representation - no election by constituency	
2011	Proportional representation - no election by constituency	
2016	Mikhail Kuzmin	United Russia
2021	Mikhail Kuzmin	United Russia
2026	Olga Kazakova	United Russia

== Election results ==
=== 1993 ===
Summary of the 12 December 1993 Russian legislative election in the Stavropol constituency
Candidate	Party	Votes	%
Aleksandr Traspov	Independent	38,093	13.51%
Valentina Kozhukhova	Women of Russia	35,829	12.71%
Aleksandr Kravchenko	Independent	28,937	10.26%
Sergey Bystrov	Agrarian Party	25,120	8.91%
Vladimir Didenko	Liberal Democratic Party	24,564	8.71%
Nikolay Dyadenko	Independent	15,045	5.34%
Vasily Balditsyn	Civic Union	11,634	4.13%
against all		56,356	19.99%
Total		281,904	100%

=== 1995 ===
Summary of the 17 December 1995 Russian legislative election in the Stavropol constituency
Candidate	Party	Votes	%
Vasily Iver	Communist Party	67,728	22.29%
Andrey Razin	Independent	32,697	10.76%
Sergey Petrenko	Our Home – Russia	23,599	7.77%
Aleksandr Kosyanov	Bloc of Independents	20,322	6.69%
Vasily Belchenko	Independent	15,193	5.00%
Viktor Khlopotnya	Independent	15,051	4.95%
Larisa Maksakova	Liberal Democratic Party	14,951	4.92%
Sergey Bystrov	Agrarian Party	13,537	4.45%
Dmitry Kuzmin	Independent	13,274	4.37%
Oleg Naumov	Democratic Choice of Russia – United Democrats	11,679	3.84%
Aleksandr Traspov (incumbent)	Forward, Russia!	9,647	3.17%
Lyubov Yermolova	Education — Future of Russia	6,856	2.26%
Anatoly Kutovenko	Trade Unions and Industrialists – Union of Labour	6,394	2.10%
Andrey Dudinov	Independent	4,477	1.47%
Grigory Ilchenko	Independent	4,069	1.34%
Yevgeny Ivanov	Independent	3,181	1.05%
Stepan Bondar	Independent	2,963	0.97%
Vadim Balak	Independent	2,678	0.88%
Tatyana Dakhno	People's Union	2,200	0.72%
Nikolay Dyadenko	Party of Russian Unity and Accord	2,161	0.71%
against all		23,681	7.79%
Total		303,899	100%

=== 1999 ===
Summary of the 19 December 1999 Russian legislative election in the Stavropol constituency
Candidate	Party	Votes	%
Vasily Iver (incumbent)	Communist Party	52,335	18.08%
Andrey Razin	Independent	41,619	14.38%
Dmitry Kuzmin	Independent	33,539	11.59%
Vladimir Reshetnyak	Independent	32,481	11.22%
Yevgeny Pismenny	Fatherland – All Russia	24,030	8.30%
Vladimir Popov	Party of Pensioners	20,229	6.99%
Anatoly Korobeynikov	Independent	11,097	3.83%
Andrey Dudinov	Independent	9,578	3.31%
Vladimir Rokhmistrov	Yabloko	9,492	3.28%
Sergey Popov (Safonov)	Union of Right Forces	9,189	3.17%
Tatyana Gryadskaya	Spiritual Heritage	5,724	1.98%
Olga Volodina	Independent	3,571	1.23%
Vasily Bodrov	Independent	2,512	0.87%
Vladimir Kozinets	Andrey Nikolayev and Svyatoslav Fyodorov Bloc	1,487	0.51%
Anatoly Babich	Russian Socialist Party	1,367	0.47%
Marina Godlevskaya	Peace, Labour, May	969	0.33%
against all		23,975	8.28%
Total		289,487	100%

=== 2003 ===
Summary of the 7 December 2003 Russian legislative election in the Stavropol constituency
Candidate	Party	Votes	%
Anatoly Semenchenko	Independent	59,264	22.35%
Aleksandr Kuzmin	Independent	51,614	19.47%
Mikhail Kuzmin	Independent	31,681	11.95%
Vladimir Brykalov	Independent	26,121	9.85%
Vasily Iver (incumbent)	Communist Party	23,867	9.00%
Vyacheslav Bunyatov	Independent	8,077	3.05%
Aleksandr Traspov	Liberal Democratic Party	6,629	2.50%
Yury Pankov	Agrarian Party	4,095	1.54%
Tatyana Trembacheva	Union of Right Forces	3,352	1.26%
Boris Dyakonov	Yabloko	3,224	1.22%
Sergey Kharitonov	Independent	3,091	1.17%
Aleksandr Kozlov	Independent	2,850	1.07%
Aleksandr Krasulya	New Course — Automobile Russia	1,476	0.56%
Igor Lutsenko	Independent	1,454	0.55%
Sergey Mun	Independent	695	0.26%
against all		33,544	12.65%
Total		265,432	100%

=== 2016 ===
Summary of the 18 September 2016 Russian legislative election in the Stavropol constituency
Candidate	Party	Votes	%
Mikhail Kuzmin	United Russia	109,797	49.62%
Olga Drozdova	Liberal Democratic Party	34,759	15.71%
Viktor Sobolev	Communist Party	22,134	10.00%
Aleksandr Kuzmin	A Just Russia	17,207	7.78%
Yury Rukosuyev	Communists of Russia	7,931	3.58%
Vasily Avdeyev	The Greens	5,120	2.31%
Nikolay Sasin	Party of Growth	4,292	1.94%
Sergey Kulagin	Patriots of Russia	3,477	1.57%
Pavel Lebedev	People's Freedom Party	3,054	1.38%
Yevgeny Mokhov	Rodina	2,893	1.31%
Total		221,285	100%

=== 2021 ===
Summary of the 17-19 September 2021 Russian legislative election in the Stavropol constituency
Candidate	Party	Votes	%
Mikhail Kuzmin (incumbent)	United Russia	192,863	56.65%
Viktor Goncharov	Communist Party	44,298	13.01%
Aleksandr Kuzmin	A Just Russia — For Truth	39,585	11.63%
Sergey Vorobyev	Communists of Russia	14,506	4.26%
Dmitry Pastyrev	Liberal Democratic Party	11,010	3.23%
Ivan Ivannikov	Party of Pensioners	9,633	2.83%
Boris Mitrofansky	New People	8,440	2.48%
Aleksey Antonov	Party of Growth	6,876	2.02%
Mikhail Seredenko	Rodina	3,701	1.09%
Total		340,474	100%

=== 2026 ===
Summary of the 18-20 September 2026 Russian legislative election in the Stavropol constituency
Candidate	Party	Votes	%
Olga Kazakova	United Russia	244,775	59.61%
Viktor Goncharov	Communist Party	63,765	15.53%
Stanislav Kireyev	New People	57,678	14.05%
Aleksandr Kuzmin	A Just Russia	22,829	5.56%
Sergey Moreplavtsev	The Greens	6,925	1.69%
Vitaly Zubenko	Yabloko	2,792	0.68%
Dmitry Stepanov	Rodina	2,758	0.67%
Total		410,658	100%
