= Blagodarny =

Blagodarny (masculine), Blagodarnaya (feminine), or Blagodarnoye (neuter) may refer to:

- Blagodarny Urban Settlement, a municipal formation which the Town of Blagodarny in Blagodarnensky District of Stavropol Krai, Russia is incorporated as
- Blagodarny, Russia (Blagodarnaya, Blagodarnoye), several inhabited localities in Russia
- Blagodarnoye, Armenia, a town in Lori Province, Armenia
