= Ipatovo =

Ipatovo may refer to:

- Ipatovo kurgan, an archaeological site in Russia
- Ipatovo Urban Settlement, a municipal formation which the Town of Ipatovo in Ipatovsky District of Stavropol Krai, Russia is incorporated as
- Ipatovo (inhabited locality), several inhabited localities in Russia
