= Novoselitsky =

Novoselitsky (masculine), Novoselitskaya (feminine), or Novoselitskoye (neuter) may refer to:

- Novoselitsky District, a district of Stavropol Krai, Russia
- Novoselitskoye, a rural locality (a selo) in Novoselitsky District of Stavropol Krai, Russia
