= Mineralnye Vody constituency =

Constituency in Stavropol Krai, Russia

Mineralnye Vody single-member constituency
- Constituency of the Russian State Duma

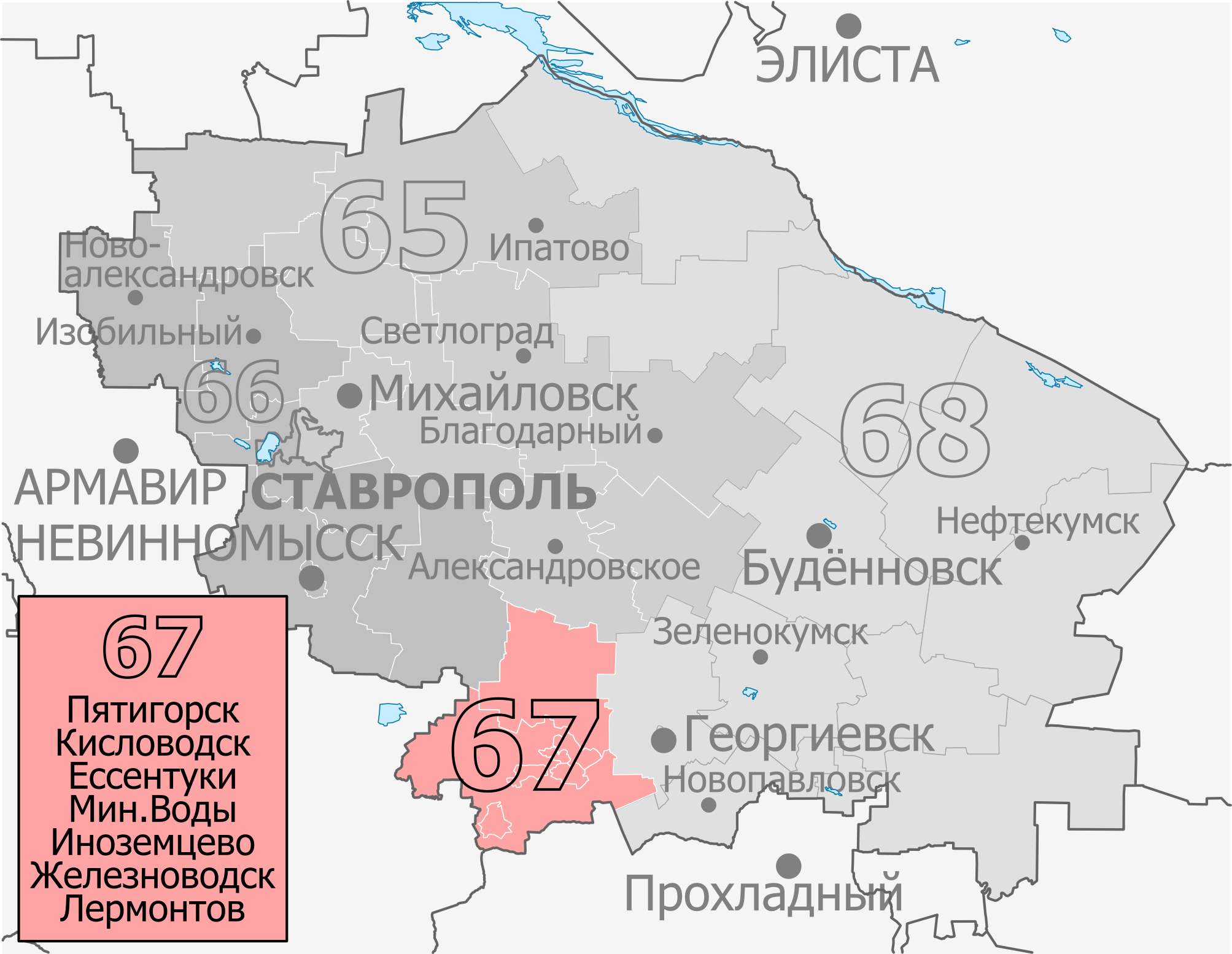
- Constituency boundaries from 1993 to 2007 and since 2016
- Deputy: Ilya Drozdov; Independent
- Federal subject: Stavropol Krai
- Districts: Kislovodsk, Lermontov, Mineralnye Vody, Mineralovodsky, Predgorny, Pyatigorsk, Yessentuki, Zheleznovodsk
- Voters: 505,199 (2026)

The Mineralnye Vody constituency (No.71 (Note: No.54 in 1993-1995, No.53 in 1995-2003, No.55 in 2003-2007, No.67 in 2016–2026)) is a Russian legislative constituency in Stavropol Krai. The constituency covers the entirety of Caucasian Mineral Waters resort in southern Stavropol Krai.

The constituency has been represented since 2026 by Liberal Democratic Party faction member Ilya Drozdov, two-term State Duma member and former Deputy Premier of Stavropol Krai, who won the open seat as an Independent after three-term United Russia incumbent Olga Kazakova successfully sought re-election in the Stavropol constituency.

== Boundaries ==
1993–2007, 2016–present: Kislovodsk, Lermontov, Mineralnye Vody, Mineralovodsky District, Predgorny District, Pyatigorsk, Yessentuki, Zheleznovodsk
The constituency has been covering the entirety of Caucasian Mineral Waters resort, including the cities of Kislovodsk, Lermontov, Mineralnye Vody, Pyatigorsk, Yessentuki and Zheleznovodsk, since its creation in 1993.

== Members elected ==
Election	Member	Party
1993	Vladimir Katrenko	Independent
1995	Stanislav Govorukhin	Stanislav Govorukhin Bloc
1999	Vladimir Katrenko (Note: appointed Auditor of the Accounts Chamber of Russia in December 2007)	Independent
2003	Vladimir Katrenko	United Russia
2007	Proportional representation - no election by constituency	
2011	Proportional representation - no election by constituency	
2016	Olga Kazakova	United Russia
2021	Olga Kazakova	United Russia
2026	Ilya Drozdov	Independent

== Election results ==
=== 1993 ===
Summary of the 12 December 1993 Russian legislative election in the Mineralnye Vody constituency
Candidate	Party	Votes	%
Vladimir Katrenko	Independent	53,697	19.81%
Roman Gavrilov	Independent	42,289	15.60%
Svetlana Lyashenko	Independent	35,464	13.08%
Mikhail Snezhkov	Liberal Democratic Party	23,142	8.54%
Viktor Mertsalov	Choice of Russia	20,787	7.67%
Boris Svyatun	Independent	16,091	5.94%
Viktor Kaznacheyev	Independent	13,002	4.80%
Nikolay Sergeyev	Agrarian Party	11,770	4.34%
against all		32,668	12.05%
Total		271,074	100%

=== 1995 ===
Summary of the 17 December 1995 Russian legislative election in the Mineralnye Vody constituency
Candidate	Party	Votes	%
Stanislav Govorukhin	Stanislav Govorukhin Bloc	73,817	23.41%
Svetlana Umnyakova	Communist Party	52,109	16.53%
Aleksandr Kashcheyev	Independent	49,503	15.70%
Roman Gavrilov	Forward, Russia!	33,549	10.64%
Yury Churekov	Independent	21,939	6.96%
Vladimir Gevorkov	Independent	11,208	3.56%
Viktor Kaznacheyev	Independent	7,735	2.45%
Aleksandr Porublev	Independent	7,364	2.34%
Mikhail Snezhkov	Liberal Democratic Party	7,070	2.24%
Aleksey Popov	Trade Unions and Industrialists – Union of Labour	6,131	1.94%
Vladimir Polyakov	Independent	4,310	1.37%
Sergey Prokopov	Ivan Rybkin Bloc	4,028	1.28%
Yury Karakhanov	Independent	2,979	0.94%
Vasily Tovkan	Independent	2,716	0.86%
Vyacheslav Yegorov	Independent	2,405	0.76%
Vladimir Trufanov	Independent	2,182	0.69%
Vladimir Adelkhanov	Russian Party of Automobile Owners	1,992	0.63%
against all		16,958	5.38%
Total		315,266	100%

=== 1999 ===
Summary of the 19 December 1999 Russian legislative election in the Mineralnye Vody constituency
Candidate	Party	Votes	%
Vladimir Katrenko	Independent	61,844	21.83%
Yury Malyshak	Communist Party	58,876	20.78%
Anatoly Dyakov	Independent	33,365	11.78%
Maria Ivanova	Independent	22,533	7.95%
Natalya Bryntsalova	Russian Socialist Party	17,693	6.24%
Artemy Zakharenkov	Yabloko	16,258	5.74%
Ilya Iliadi	Party of Pensioners	13,220	4.67%
Sergey Galkin	Independent	11,367	4.01%
Sergey Kshov	Liberal Democratic Party	3,488	1.23%
Oleg Timofeyev	Congress of Russian Communities-Yury Boldyrev Movement	3,124	1.10%
Roman Barbashov	Peace, Labour, May	3,040	1.07%
Viktor Milenin	Andrey Nikolayev and Svyatoslav Fyodorov Bloc	2,540	0.90%
Nikolay Kurasov	Independent	2,223	0.78%
against all		27,702	9.78%
Total		283,323	100%

=== 2003 ===
Summary of the 7 December 2003 Russian legislative election in the Mineralnye Vody constituency
Candidate	Party	Votes	%
Vladimir Katrenko (incumbent)	United Russia	120,757	51.73%
Yury Malyshak	Communist Party	30,702	13.15%
Igor Golikov	Liberal Democratic Party	14,959	6.41%
Vladimir Gevorkov	Union of Right Forces	9,676	4.14%
Oleg Taran	Yabloko	8,953	3.84%
Oleg Timofeyev	Party of Russia's Rebirth-Russian Party of Life	3,664	1.57%
Sergey Sadovnikov	For a Holy Russia	3,331	1.43%
Yury Pechenov	Independent	2,845	1.22%
Sergey Shcherbakov	United Russian Party Rus'	2,648	1.13%
against all		31,588	13.53%
Total		233,674	100%

=== 2016 ===
Summary of the 18 September 2016 Russian legislative election in the Mineralnye Vody constituency
Candidate	Party	Votes	%
Olga Kazakova	United Russia	98,200	52.80%
Aleksandr Sysoyev	Liberal Democratic Party	21,727	11.68%
Valery Smolyakov	Communist Party	18,742	10.08%
Kirill Kuzmin	A Just Russia	14,990	8.06%
Marat Marshankulov	Communists of Russia	6,190	3.33%
Yevgeny Nikitin	The Greens	5,290	2.84%
Mikhail Serkov	Rodina	3,431	1.84%
Aleksey Kursish	Yabloko	3,331	1.79%
Andrey Petlitsyn	Party of Growth	2,685	1.44%
Total		186,002	100%

=== 2021 ===
Summary of the 17-19 September 2021 Russian legislative election in the Mineralnye Vody constituency
Candidate	Party	Votes	%
Olga Kazakova (incumbent)	United Russia	193,273	62.04%
Andrey Serdyukov	Communist Party	41,208	13.23%
Oleg Shpunt	A Just Russia — For Truth	15,575	4.99%
Yelena Miloslavskaya	Communists of Russia	15,266	4.90%
Nadezhda Piltenko	Liberal Democratic Party	12,298	3.95%
Ilya Revo	New People	9,468	3.04%
Yury Mirzoyev	Party of Pensioners	8,959	2.88%
Natalya Govor	Civic Platform	5,628	1.81%
Total		311,519	100%

=== 2026 ===
Summary of the 18-20 September 2026 Russian legislative election in the Mineralnye Vody constituency
Candidate	Party	Votes	%
Ilya Drozdov	Independent	205,084	50.19%
Andrey Serdyukov	Communist Party	62,574	15.31%
Oleg Shpunt	A Just Russia	43,367	10.61%
Sergey Vorobyov	Communists of Russia	33,469	8.19%
Andrey Zhukov	New People	28,298	6.93%
Vasily Avdeyev	The Greens	13,470	3.30%
Artemy Zakharenkov	Yabloko	3,860	0.94%
Astemir Shtynov	Rodina	3,024	0.74%
Total		408,596	100%
