= Dmitry Kuzmin (disambiguation) =

Dmitry Kuzmin is a Russian poet, critic, and publisher.

Dmitry Kuzmin may also refer to:

- Dmitri Kuzmin, a Russian-born Kyrgyzstani swimmer
- Dmitry Kuzmin (mayor), a Russian politician and mayor
- Dmitry Kuzmin (senator) (born 1975), a Russian politician, senator
- Dmitry Kuzmin-Karavayev (1886–1959), a Russian former Bolshevik and Catholic priest
- Dmitry Kuzmin-Karavayev (captain), one of Leino's prisoners
- Dmitry Kuzmin-Karavayev (general), general of the Russian Imperial Army
