= Blagodarny, Russia =

Blagodarny (Russian: Благодарный; masculine), Blagodarnaya (Благодарная; feminine), or Blagodarnoye (Благодарное; neuter) is the name of several inhabited localities in Russia.

== Modern localities ==
Urban localities

- Blagodarny, Stavropol Krai, a town in Blagodarnensky District of Stavropol Krai

Rural localities

- Blagodarny, Rostov Oblast, a khutor in Mikhaylovskoye Rural Settlement of Tselinsky District of Rostov Oblast
- Blagodarnoye, Krasnodar Krai, a selo in Blagodarnensky Rural Okrug of Otradnensky District of Krasnodar Krai
- Blagodarnoye, Tashlinsky District, Orenburg Oblast, a selo in Blagodarnovsky Selsoviet of Tashlinsky District of Orenburg Oblast
- Blagodarnoye, Tyulgansky District, Orenburg Oblast, a selo in Blagodarnovsky Selsoviet of Tyulgansky District of Orenburg Oblast

== Renamed localities ==
- Blagodarnoye, former name of Blagodarny, a town in Blagodarnensky District of Stavropol Krai
