= Ipatovo (inhabited locality) =

Ipatovo (Russian: Ипатово) is the name of several inhabited localities in Russia.

Urban localities

- Ipatovo, Stavropol Krai, a town in Ipatovsky District of Stavropol Krai

Rural localities

- Ipatovo, Komi Republic, a village in Sludka Selo Administrative Territory of Syktyvdinsky District of the Komi Republic
- Ipatovo, Nizhny Novgorod Oblast, a village in Bolshesodomovsky Selsoviet of Tonkinsky District of Nizhny Novgorod Oblast
- Ipatovo, Tomsk Oblast, a village in Tomsky District of Tomsk Oblast
