= Paltsev =

Paltsev (masculine, Russian: Пальцев) or Paltseva (feminine, Russian: Пальцева) is a Russian surname. Notable people with the surname include:

- Nikolai Paltsev (1949–2021), Russian politician
- Valentin Paltsev (born 2001), Russian soccer player
