= Mikhail Kuzmin (politician) =

Russian politician

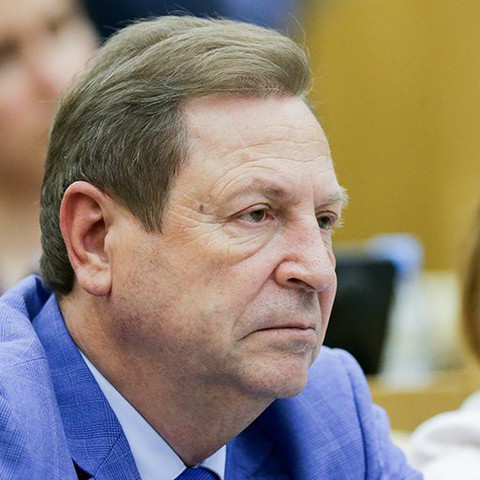

Deputy of the State Duma Russia
- Incumbent
- Assumed office 18 September 2016
- Preceded by: constituency re-established
- Constituency: Stavropol (No. 65)

Deputy of the Stavropol Krai Duma
- In office 16 December 2001 – 18 September 2016
- Constituency: Single-Member Electoral District No. 12

Mayor of city Stavropol
- In office 11 December 1991 – 16 December 2001
- President: Boris Yeltsin; Vladimir Putin
- Governor of the region: Alexander Chernogorov

Personal details
- Born: 5 August 1955 (age 71) Sverdlovsk, RSFSR, USSR
- Party: United Russia (2002-2026); Non-partisan (from 2026)
- Education: North-Caucasus Federal University

Mikhail Vladimirovich Kuzmin (Russian: Михаил Владимирович Кузьмин; born 5 August 1955 in Sverdlovsk) is a Russian politician. Deputy of the State Duma from 18 September 2016.

He was the mayor of Stavropol from 1991 to 2001 and was a member of the Chamber of Regional and Local Authorities of the Council of Europe (1991-2001).

== Biography ==
He was born on August 5, 1955, in the capital of the Urals, Sverdlovsk now known as Yekaterinburg.

In 1971, he moved to Stavropol with his family. His father, a veteran of the Great Patriotic War, was invited to work at the Stavropol Trailer Factory, which was founded in 1968. Mikhail Vladimirovich's mother worked as a district nurse in Stavropol after the move.

In his youth, Mikhail Kuzmin dreamed of studying at a flight school. However, due to a sports injury, he was advised to postpone his enrollment for a year.

In 1972, Mikhail Vladimirovich began studying in the evening department of the Stavropol Polytechnic Institute, specializing in "Machines and Devices for Food Production. He worked during the day and studied in the evening.

From 1973 to 1975, he served in the Armed Forces of the USSR. After completing his military service, he returned to the institute and enrolled in the evening department, where he continued his studies in the field of automotive engineering. Mikhail Kuzmin believed in the importance of obtaining a full-time education, so he passed the necessary exams and transferred to the full-time department. He graduated from university in 1980.

From 1980, he worked as an engineer of a group of projects to organize work in the Ministry of Agriculture and Food USSR.

Later, he worked as an instructor in the Department of Working Youth at the Stavropol Regional Committee of the Komsomol.

In 1982, he was appointed First Secretary of the October District Committee of the Komsomol in Stavropol.

In 1982, he was hired as a mechanic at the No.2 Auto Unit of the No.1564 Stavropol Auto Column. Over the years, he rose from an ordinary employee to the chief engineer of the enterprise.

In 1986, Mikhail Kuzmin was invited to work at the Stavropol City Executive Committee as the head of the industrial and transport department.

In 1990, he became the first deputy chairman of the Stavropol City Executive Committee.

From 1990 to 1991, he worked first as deputy and then as First Deputy Chairman of the Stavropol City Executive Committee.

From December 1991 to December 2001, he was the mayor of city Stavropol.

He led the city during difficult years for the country. During his time as the city's leader, he implemented projects that were unique for the region and the country, such as the creation of a municipal pension and tax service, as well as a rescue service. Kuzmin also established a municipal police force in Stavropol, which operated for some time as part of the preparation of federal legislation on this topic. He also implemented several social projects to provide housing for the city's residents, with co-financing from the city budget. He participated in the work of the Association of Cities in Southern Russia as part of the Presidential Council on Local Self-Government. He was directly involved in the development and formation of new legislation on local self-government for the country.

Additionally, from the late 1990s to 2001, he served as a member of the Chamber of Regional and Local Authorities of the Council of Europe on the recommendation of the Union of Russian Cities.

From 2002 to 2026, he was a member of the United Russia party.

According to the results of the Russian Mayor competition, he is one of the top ten city leaders in the country.

In 1997-2016, Kuzmin was the deputy of the Duma of the Stavropol Kray.

While working in the regional Duma, he was directly involved in the decision to allocate funds for the land surveying of the regional center's forests to prevent the "green lungs" of Stavropol from being seized for construction or economic purposes. He also focused on the construction and maintenance of hydraulic structures in the Stavropol Territory, particularly in flood-prone areas. He oversaw the development of nature reserves in the region and emphasized the importance of protecting the unique nature of Stavropol.

From 18 September 2016 year – member State Duma Russia.

Since 2016, he has been a member of the United Russia faction in the State Duma of the Russian Federation.

In May 2026, Kuzmin announced on his social media pages that he had written a letter of resignation from the Russian political party «United Russia».

In the spring of 2026, he announced that he had decided to leave the State Duma of the Russian Federation and not run for a third term.

== Awards ==
- Order of Honour (2002).
- Medal “For Services to the Stavropol Krai.”
- Certificate of Honor of the Federation Council of the Federal Assembly.
- Letter of Appreciation from the President of the Russian Federation.
- Certificate of Honor of the State Duma of the Federal Assembly of the Russian Federation.
- Badge of Honor “For Merit in the Development of Parliamentarism.”
