= Svetlograd =

Svetlograd Светлоград
- Town
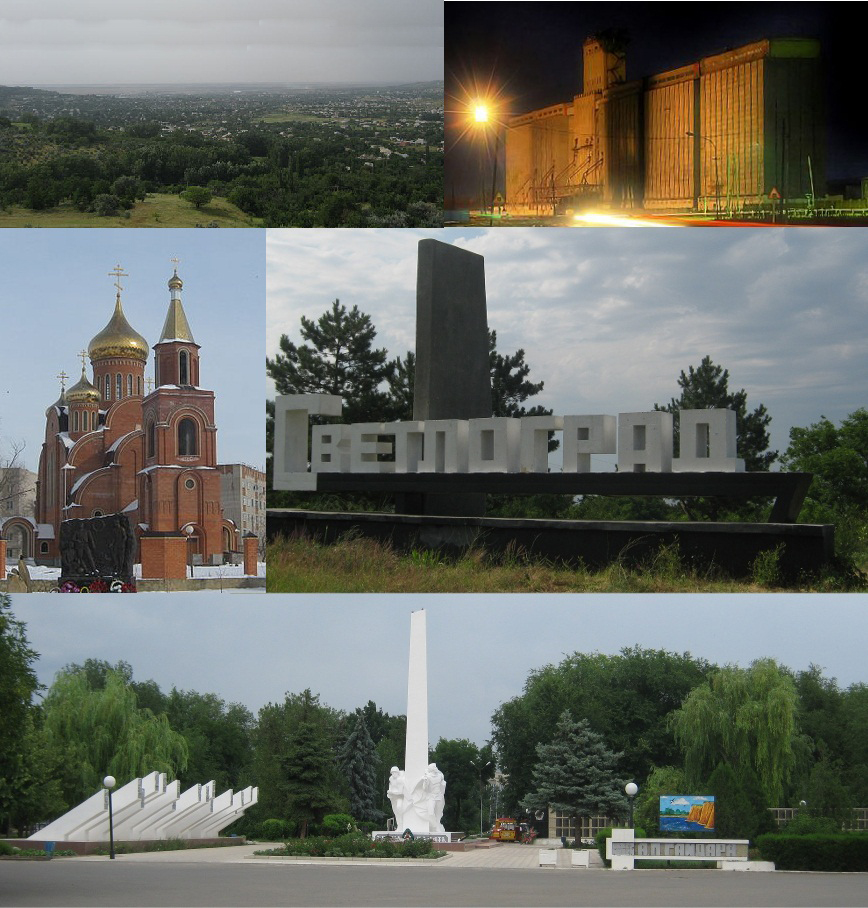
- Views of Svetlograd

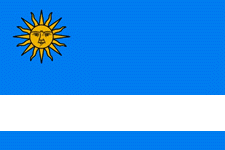
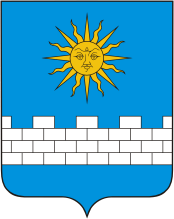
- Flag Coat of arms
- Interactive map of Svetlograd
- Location of Svetlograd Svetlograd (Stavropol Krai)
- Coordinates: 45°21′N 42°51′E
- Country: Russia
- Federal subject: Stavropol Krai
- Administrative district: Petrovsky District
- TownSelsoviet: Svetlograd
- Founded: 1750
- Town status since: 1965
- Elevation: 130 m (430 ft)

Population (2010 Census)
  - Total: 38,520
  - Estimate (2025): 34,406 (−10.7%)

Administrative status
  - Capital of: Petrovsky District, Town of Svetlograd

Municipal status
  - Municipal district: Petrovsky Municipal District
  - Urban settlement: Svetlograd Urban Settlement
  - Capital of: Petrovsky Municipal District, Svetlograd Urban Settlement
- Time zone: UTC+3 (MSK)
- Postal code: 356530
- OKTMO ID: 07646101001
- Website: svetlograd.org

Svetlograd (Russian: Светлогра́д) is a town and the administrative center of Petrovsky District in Stavropol Krai, Russia, located on the Kalaus River, 85 kilometers (53 mi) northeast of Stavropol, the administrative center of the krai. Population: 38,520 (2010 census); 39,370 (2002 census); 37,213 (1989 Soviet census).

== History ==
It was founded in 1750 as the village of Petrovskoye (Петро́вское). It was granted town status and renamed Svetlograd in 1965.

== Administrative and municipal status ==
Within the framework of administrative divisions, Svetlograd serves as the administrative center of Petrovsky District. As an administrative division, it is, together with two rural localities, incorporated within Petrovsky District as the Town of Svetlograd. As a municipal division, the Town of Svetlograd is incorporated within Petrovsky Municipal District as Svetlograd Urban Settlement.

== International relations ==
=== Twin towns — Sister cities ===
Svetlograd is twinned with:

- Rakitovo, Bulgaria (1981)
