= Rakitovo =

Rakitovo Ракитово
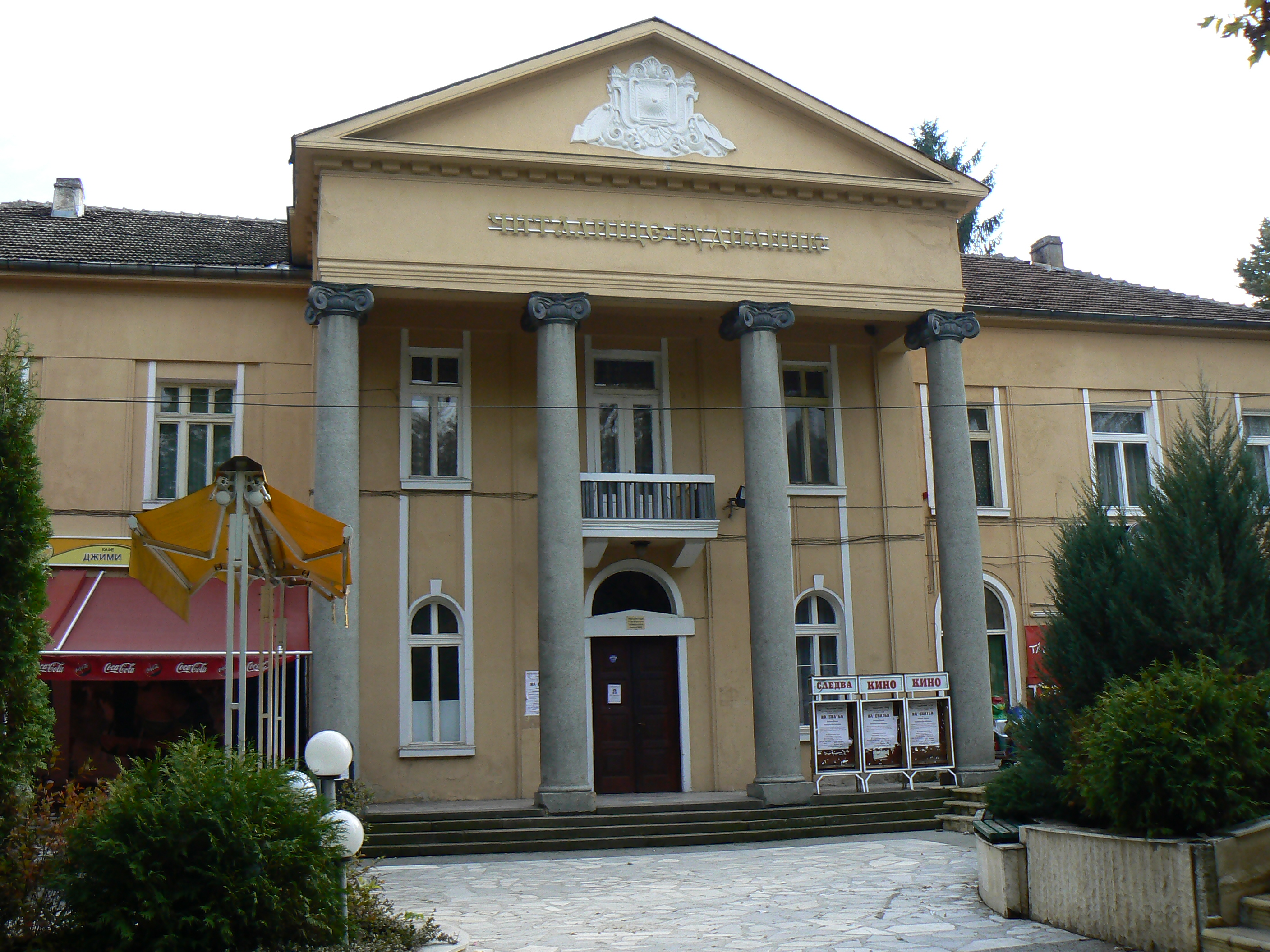

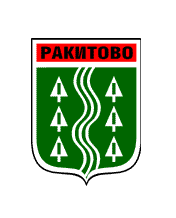
- Coat of arms

- Location of Rakitovo
- Coordinates: 41°59′N 24°05′E
- Country: Bulgaria
- Province (Oblast): Pazardzhik

Government
  - Mayor: Georgi Holyanov
- Elevation: 814 m (2,671 ft)

Population (2022)
  - Total: 7 012
- Time zone: UTC+2 (EET)
  - Summer (DST): UTC+3 (EEST)
- Postal Code: 4640
- Area code: 03542

Rakitovo (Bulgarian: Ракитово [rɐˈkitovo]) is a town in the Pazardzhik Province, Bulgaria. As of 2005 the population was 8,952. It is located in the northern part of the Rhodopi mountains at 12 km to the east of Velingrad and 7 km to the southwest of the Batak Reservoir. There is timber industry in the town. People from the region grow crops, lavender, potatoes and barley.

Some Aromanians live in Rakitovo.

== International relations ==
=== Twin towns — Sister cities ===
Rakitovo is twinned with:

- Svetlograd, Russia
