= Nikolai Paltsev =

Russian politician (1949–2021)

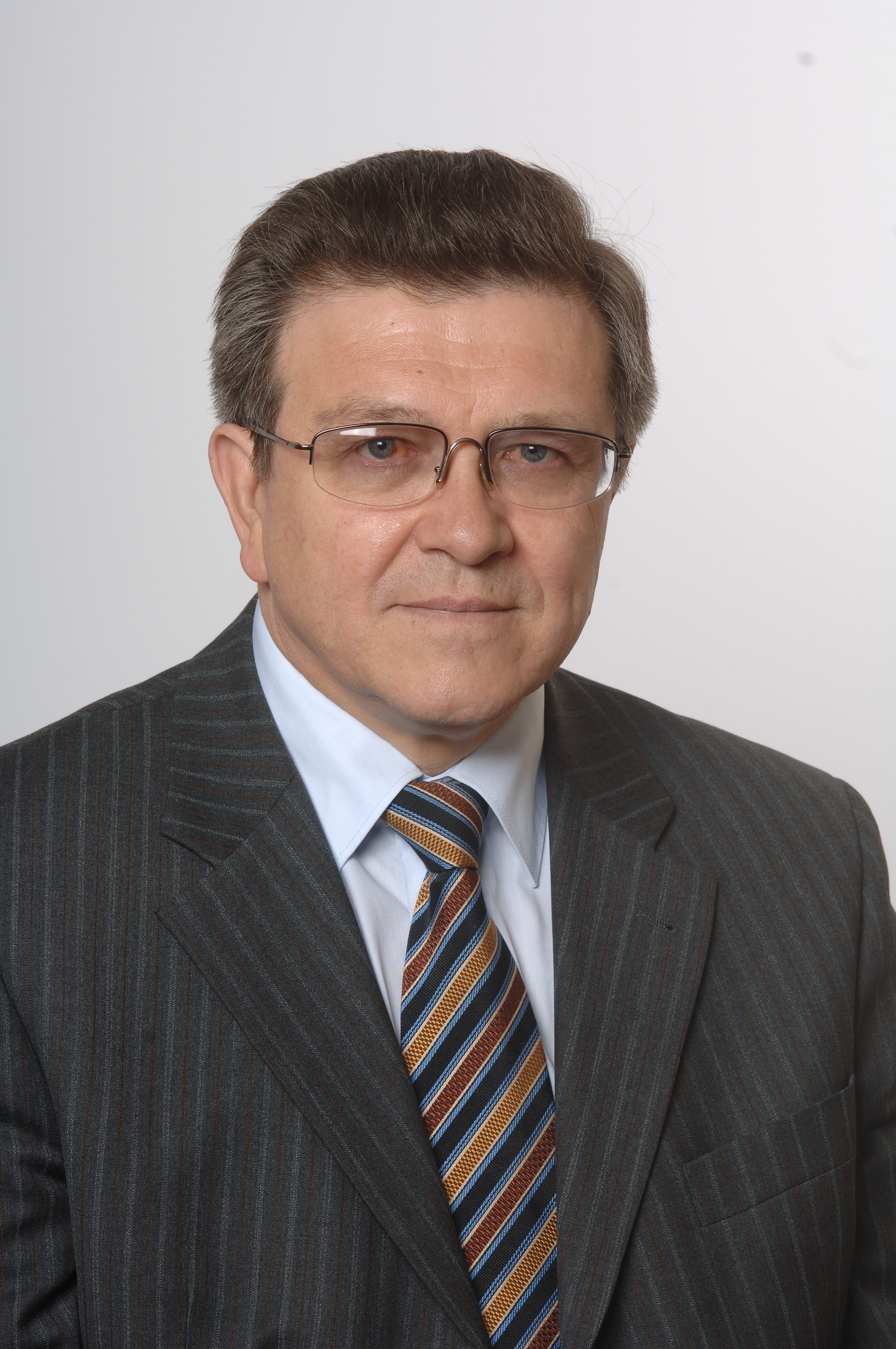
- Paltsev in 2006

Mayor of Stavropol
- In office 16 July 2008 – 25 March 2011
- Preceded by: Dmitry Sergeyevich Kuzmin
- Succeeded by: Georgy Kolyagin

Deputy Governor of Stavropol Krai
- In office 30 March 2001 – 24 June 2005

Personal details
- Born: 3 January 1949 Sukhaya Buivola, Stavropol Krai, Russian SFSR, Soviet Union
- Died: 1 December 2021 (aged 72)
- Party: CPSU (until 1991); United Russia

Nikolai Ivanovich Paltsev (Russian: Николай Иванович Пальцев; 3 January 1949 – 1 December 2021) was a Russian politician. A member of United Russia, he served as mayor of Stavropol from 2008 to 2011.

== Biography ==
Paltsev was born 3 January 1949 in the Petrovsky District of Stavropol Krai. He graduated from Pyatigorsk State University in 1973 with a degree in German. He would return to his home village and teach German, eventually being elected as the first secretary of the local Komsomol district in 1971. Paltsev rose through the ranks of the organization, becoming the head of the Department of Propaganda and Agitation in 1985, and secretary of the Central Committee from 1986-1990.

Following the collapse of the Soviet Union, Paltsev briefly worked in the private sector, before returning to public service as the deputy director of the Caucasus Mineral Water in 1999. Paltsev would hold numerous government positions in the Stavropol Krai regional government, including (successively) as Deputy Chairman (2001-2005), Minister of Labor (2005-2008), and finally as mayor of Stavropol in 2008.

Paltsev died on 1 December 2021.
