= Ipatovo kurgan =

Archaeological site in Russia

Ipatovo kurgan refers to kurgan 2 of the Ipatovo Barrow Cemetery 3, a cemetery of kurgan burial mounds, located near the town of Ipatovo in Stavropol Krai, Russia, some 120 kilometers (75 mi) northeast of Stavropol.

With a height of 7 meters (23 ft), it was one of the largest kurgans in the area. It was completely investigated in 1998–1999, revealing thirteen phases of construction and use, from the 4th millennium BCE to the 18th century.

The first grave may have been a burial of the Maykop culture, which was destroyed by later graves. The earliest extant grave contained two young people, buried in a sitting position, dating to the late 4th millennium.

The large Ipatovo mound displayed three wagon burials of the Early and Late Catacomb cultures

On top of the kurgan was a Sarmatian grave of the 3rd century BCE. A woman had been buried here in extended position on the back, together with an exceptionally rich treasure of grave-goods: six solid golden necklets, two golden spiral bracelets, two golden finger rings made from Hellenistic coins, a gilded wooden cup decorated with zoomorphic figures, a short sword with gold-decorated pommel (the presence of a weapon in a woman's grave is not an unusual feature in Sarmatian contexts) and a gold-covered scabbard, a sheet gold buckle, a gilded wooden cosmetics container, and clay vessels.

In the final phase, over one hundred simple graves were dug into the southern slope of the barrow; probably 18th century burials of the nomadic Turkic Nogai people.
