= Novoselitskoye =

Rural locality in Stavropol Krai, Russia

Coordinates: 44°44′58″N 43°26′19″E

Novoselitskoye (Russian: Новоселицкое) is a rural locality (a selo) and the administrative center of Novoselitsky District, Stavropol Krai, Russia. Population: 8,729 (2010 census); 8,569 (2002 census); 7,295 (1989 Soviet census).
