= Olga Kazakova =

Russian politician (born 1968)

- Ольга Казакова
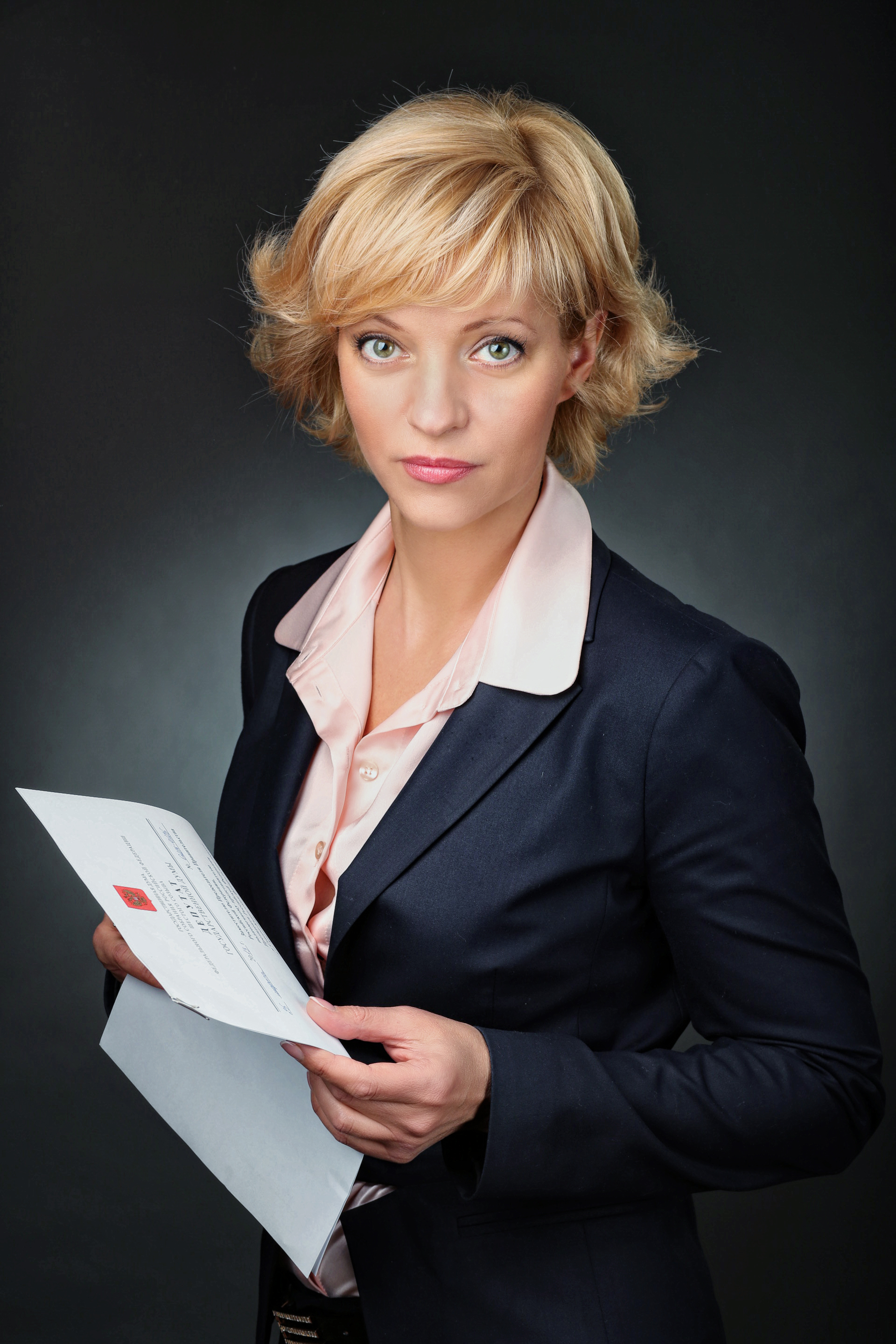

Member of the State Duma for Stavropol Krai
- Incumbent
- Assumed office 5 October 2016
- Preceded by: constituency re-established
- Constituency: Mineralnye Vody (No. 67)

Member of the State Duma (Party list seat)
- In office 22 May 2012 – 5 October 2016

Chair of the State Duma Culture Committee
- Incumbent
- Assumed office 17 September 2024
- Preceded by: Elena Yampolskaya

Personal details
- Born: 30 May 1968 (age 58) Usolye-Sibirskoye, Irkutsk Oblast, Russian SFSR, USSR
- Party: Komsomol/CPSU (former); United Russia
- Education: University of Luhansk
- Occupation: Teacher

Olga Mikhailovna Kazakova (Russian: Ольга Михайловна Казакова; born 30 May 1968 in the city of Usolye-Sibirskoye, in the Soviet Union) is a Russian politician, was the Minister of Culture of the Stavropol Krai, since 2012, deputy of the State Duma, First Deputy Chairman of the Committee on Culture.

== Career ==
Born in the family of an officer in the Soviet army, she lived with her family in the city of Luhansk, Ukrainian SSR. In 1990 she graduated from University of Luhansk with a degree in Russian language and literature. She was a Komsomol member.

From 1984 to 1991 at the Komsomol work, head of the children's dance club, kindergarten teacher. From 1992 to 1996, a primary school teacher in Vorkuta and Nevinnomyssk.

From 2000 to 2003, an assistant to a deputy of the city parliament of the city of Stavropol, executive director of the Slavyansk Sports Center. From 2003 to 2009, he was the head of the youth affairs department of the Administration of the city of Stavropol. From 2009 to 2011, chairman of the Committee on Youth Affairs of the Government of the Stavropol Krai. From 2011 to 2012, the Minister of Culture of the Government of the Stavropol Krai.

On 22 May 2012 she became deputy of the State Duma of the sixth convocation of the United Russia fraction on the All-Russia People's Front quota from the Stavropol Territory, member of the State Duma Committee on Family, Women and Children.

In 2016, according to the primaries of United Russia, it took 1st place (78% of the vote) in the single-member constituency. Re-elected deputy of the State Duma of the seventh convocation, elected first deputy chairman of the Committee on Culture.

== Family ==
Unmarried, mother of two children: a daughter, Elona (born 1987), and a son, Mikhail (born 1997). Elona graduated from the North-Caucasus State Technical University, is a social psychologist and educator, head of the company “Professional League of Sports Dance of the 26th Region”, and a coach at the dance studio “A-Class”[33]. She is a winner of various international and national competitions in ballroom dancing, hip-hop, and breakdance. She holds the title of Candidate for Master of Sports in ballroom dancing. Elona has participated in TV shows such as Dances Without Rules on TNT (2009), Battle for Respect on Muz-TV (2010), and Factor A on Russia TV channel (2011). She has worked as stage director for solo concerts of “26th Region,” choreographer of the International Festival of Music Performers New Wave in Latvia (2009–2010), and choreographer-director at the M. A. Bulgakov Theater (The Day of Wish Fulfillment, In the Cube, 23 Words for Four)
