= Blagodarnoye, Armenia =

Blagodarnoye Բլագոդարնոյե
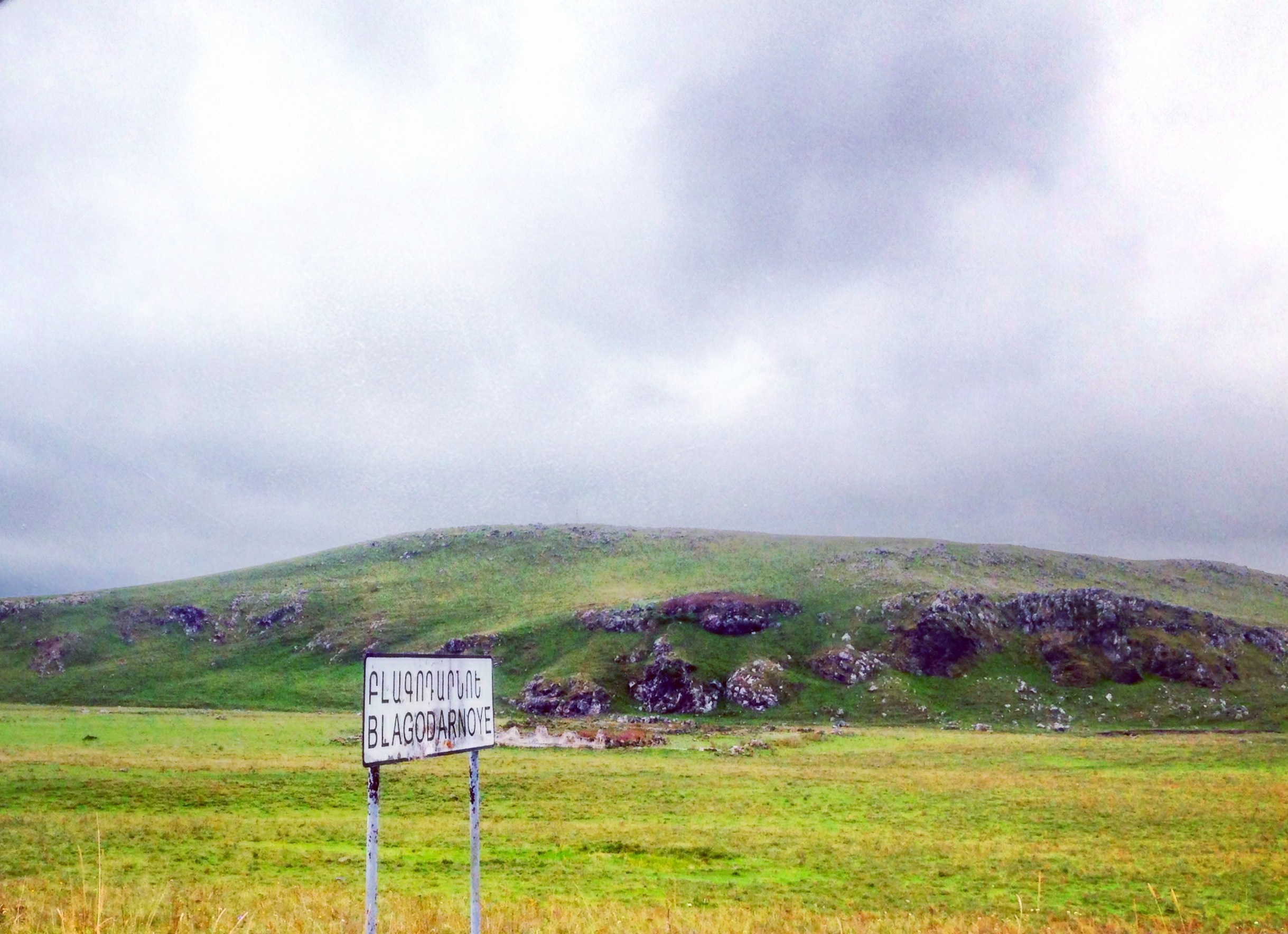

- Location within Armenia
- Coordinates: 41°05′N 44°11′E
- Country: Armenia
- Marz (Province): Lori Province
- Elevation: 1,615 m (5,299 ft)

Population (2011)
  - Total: 227
- Time zone: UTC+4 ( )
  - Summer (DST): UTC+5

Blagodarnoye (Armenian: Բլագոդարնոյե, also romanized as Blagodarnoe) is a village in the Lori Province of Armenia.
