= Blagodarny, Stavropol Krai =

Blagodarny Благодарный
- Town
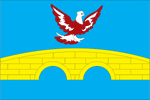
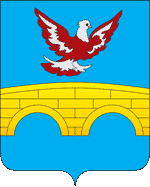
- Flag Coat of arms
- Interactive map of Blagodarny
- Location of Blagodarny Blagodarny (Stavropol Krai)
- Coordinates: 45°06′N 43°27′E
- Country: Russia
- Federal subject: Stavropol Krai
- Administrative district: Blagodarnensky District
- TownSelsoviet: Blagodarny
- Founded: 1782
- Town status since: 1971
- Elevation: 160 m (520 ft)

Population (2010 Census)
  - Total: 32,725
  - Estimate (2025): 30,632 (−6.4%)

Administrative status
  - Capital of: Blagodarnensky District, Town of Blagodarny

Municipal status
  - Municipal district: Blagodarnensky Municipal District
  - Urban settlement: Blagodarny Urban Settlement
  - Capital of: Blagodarnensky Municipal District, Blagodarny Urban Settlement
- Time zone: UTC+3 (MSK)
- Postal code: 356420
- OKTMO ID: 07510000001

Blagodarny (Russian: Благода́рный) is a town and the administrative center of Blagodarnensky District in Stavropol Krai, Russia, located on the Mokraya Buyvola River (Kuma's tributary), 150 kilometers (93 mi) east of Stavropol, the administrative center of the krai. Population: 32,725 (2010 census); 34,500 (2002 census); 27,828 (1989 Soviet census). It was previously known as Blagodarnoye.

== History ==
It was founded in 1782 as the village of Blagodarnoye (Благода́рное). It was granted town status in 1971.

== Administrative and municipal status ==
Within the framework of administrative divisions, Blagodarny serves as the administrative center of Blagodarnensky District. As an administrative division, it is incorporated within Blagodarnensky District as the Town of Blagodarny. As a municipal division, the Town of Blagodarny is incorporated within Blagodarnensky Municipal District as Blagodarny Urban Settlement.
