= Ipatovsky District =

Ipatovsky District Ипатовский район (Russian)
- District
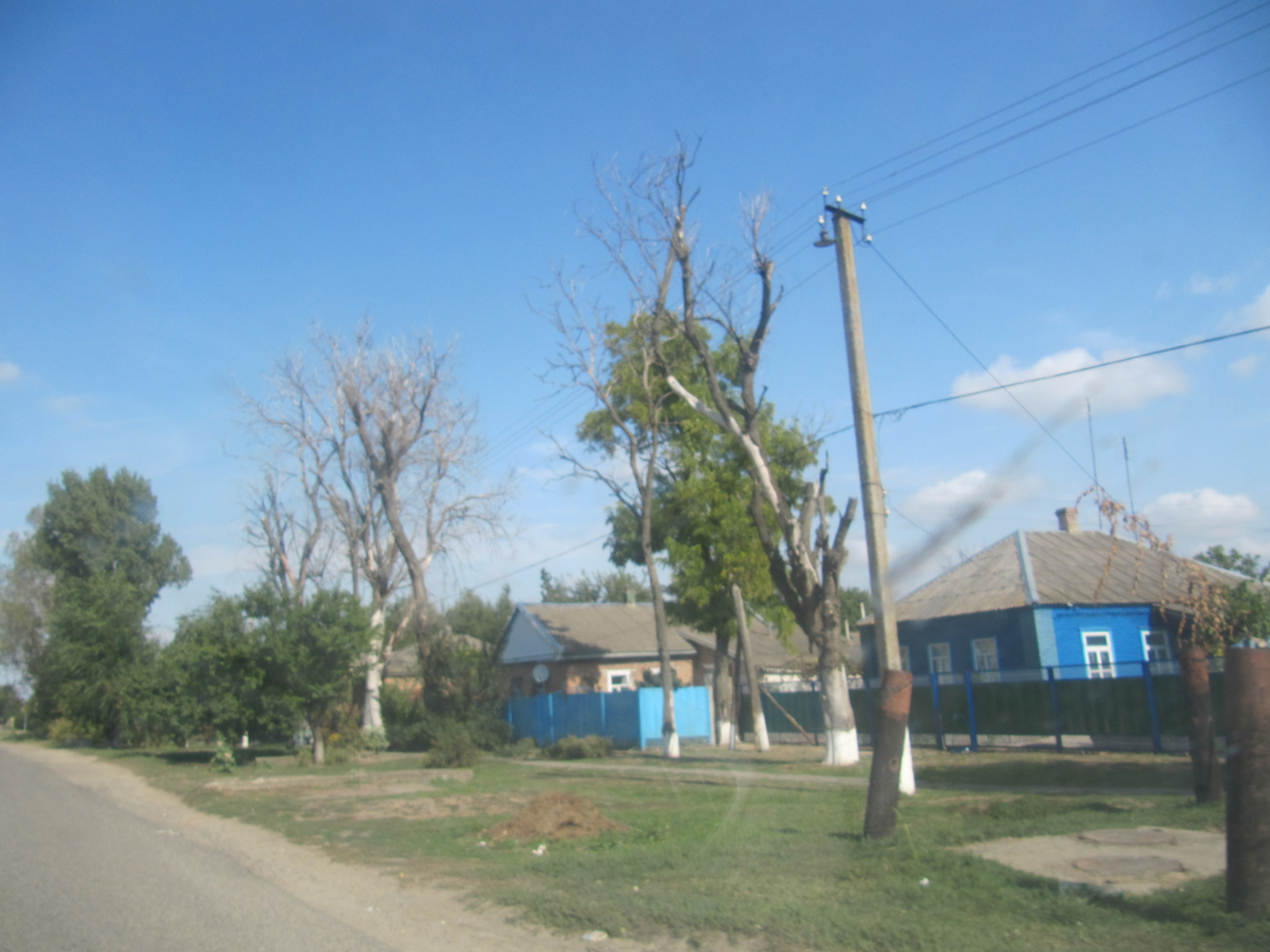
- The selo of Takhta in Ipatovsky District

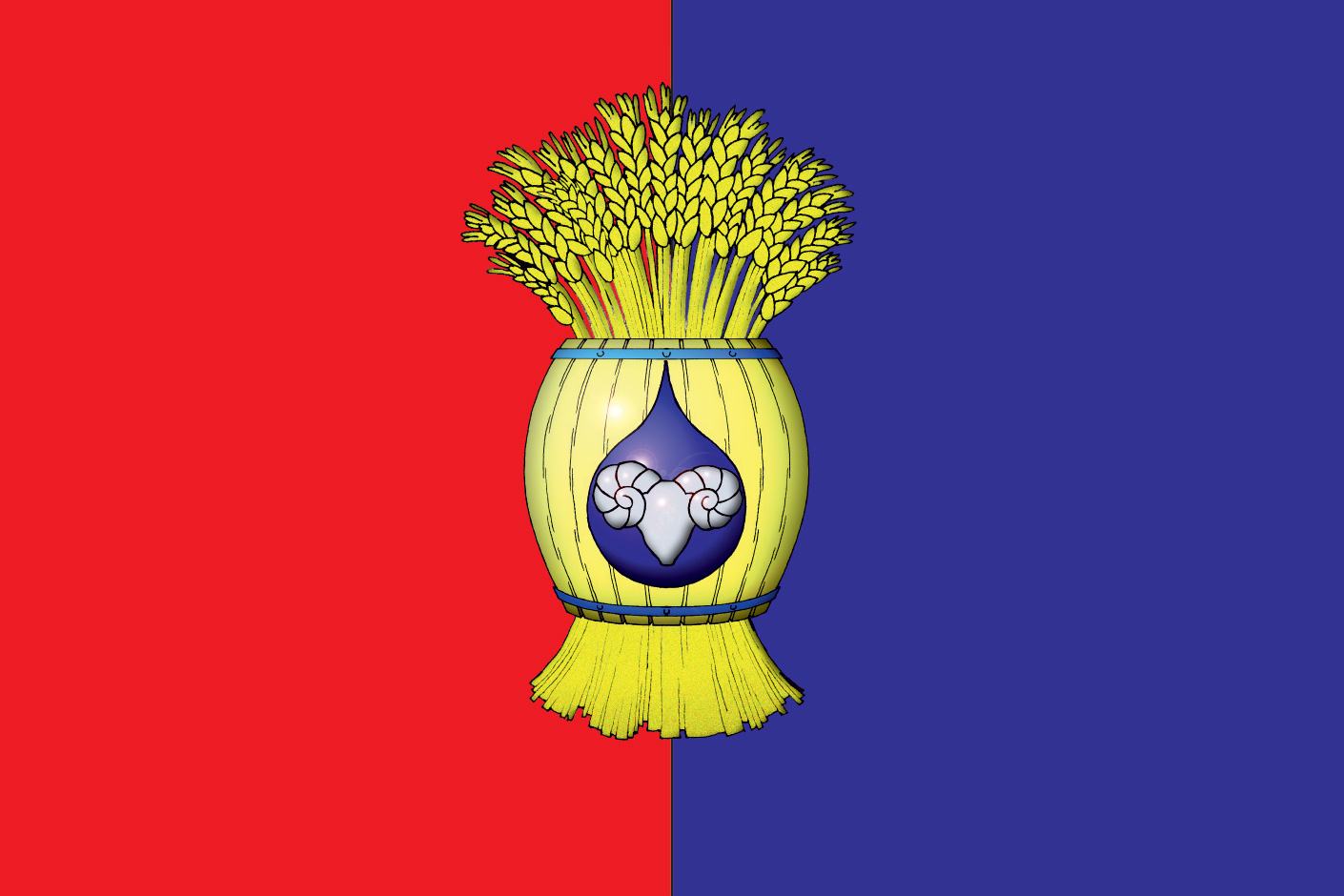
- Flag Coat of arms
- Location of Ipatovsky District in Stavropol Krai
- Coordinates: 45°43′N 42°54′E
- Country: Russia
- Federal subject: Stavropol Krai
- Established: 1924
- Administrative center: Ipatovo

Area
  - Total: 4,036 km^{2} (1,558 sq mi)

Population (2010 Census)
  - Total: 62,751
  - Density: 15.55/km^{2} (40.27/sq mi)
  - Urban: 41.5%
  - Rural: 58.5%

Administrative structure
  - Administrative divisions: 1 Towns, 13 Selsoviets
  - Inhabited localities: 1 cities/towns, 47 rural localities

Municipal structure
  - Municipally incorporated as: Ipatovsky Municipal District
  - Municipal divisions: 1 urban settlements, 15 rural settlements
- Time zone: UTC+3 (MSK)
- OKTMO ID: 07714000
- Website: http://www.ipatovo.org

Ipatovsky District (Russian: Ипа́товский райо́н) is an administrative district (raion), one of the twenty-six in Stavropol Krai, Russia. Municipally, it is incorporated as Ipatovsky Municipal District. It is located in the north of the krai. The area of the district is 4,036 square kilometers (1,558 sq mi). Its administrative center is the town of Ipatovo. Population: 62,751 (2010 census); 69,268 (2002 Census); 64,725 (1989 Census). The population of Ipatovo accounts for 41.5% of the district's total population.
