= Dmitry Kuzmin (mayor) =

Russian politician

Dmitry Sergeyevich Kuzmin
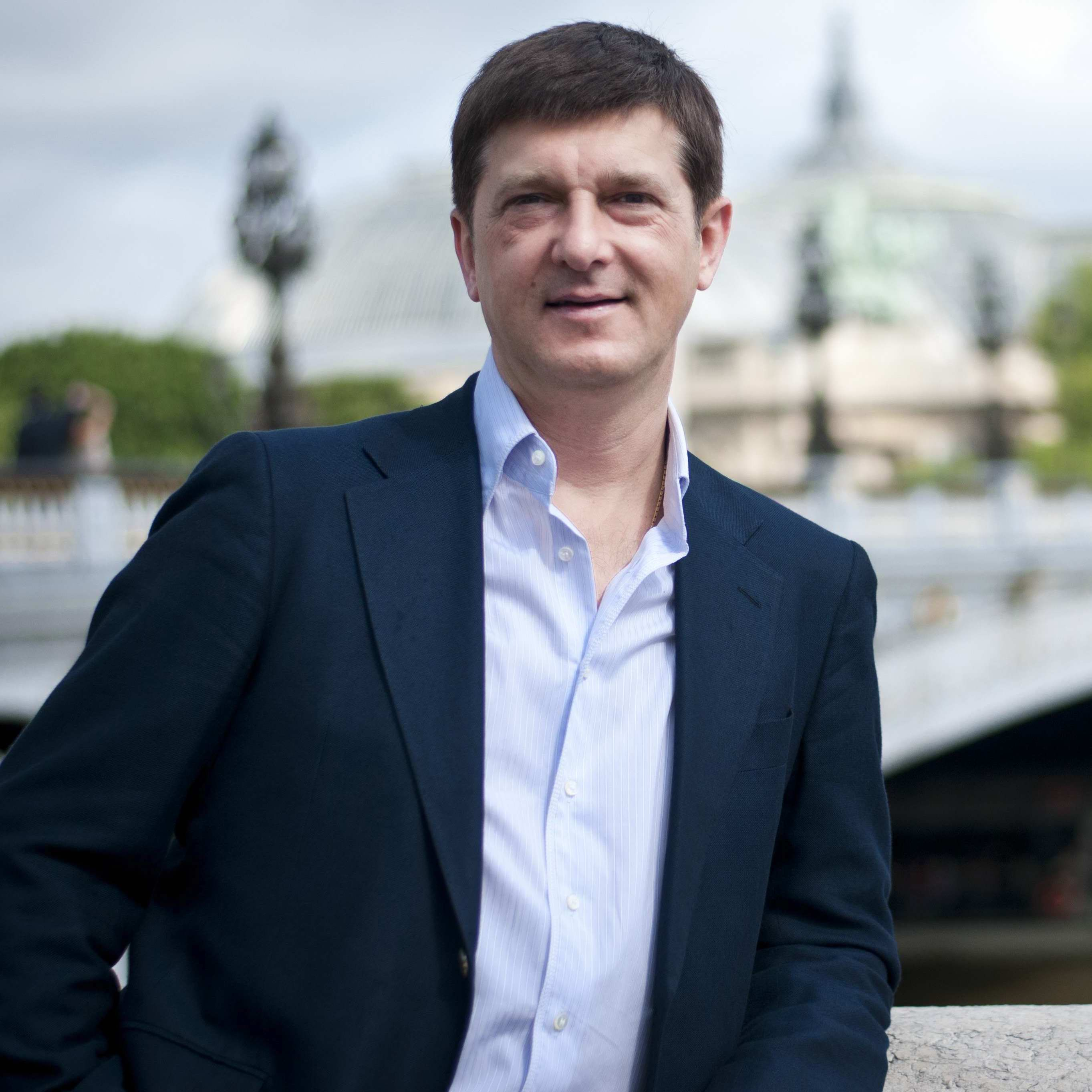

Chairman of the political party «Love»
- Incumbent
- Assumed office 15 April 2017
- Preceded by: position established

Mayor of city Stavropol
- In office 21 September 2003 – 16 July 2008
- President: Vladimir Putin; Dmitry Medvedev
- Governor of the region: Alexander Chernogorov
- Preceded by: Ivan Timoshenko
- Succeeded by: Nikolai Paltsev

Vice-chairman of the Committee on Culture and Education of the Council of Europe
- In office 30 May 2006 – 16 July 2008
- Chairman Council of Europe: Sergey Lavrov; Vuk Draskovic; Luis Maria de Puig

Deputy of the Stavropol Krai Duma
- In office 16 December 2001 – 7 December 2006

Personal details
- Born: 19 May 1966 year Stavropol, RSFSR, USSR
- Party: A Just Russia; Love
- Education: Stavropol Polytechnic Institute
- Profession: politician

Dmitry Sergeyevich Kuzmin (Russian: Дми́трий Серге́евич Кузьми́н; born 25 July 1977, Stavropol, RSFSR, USSR) is a Russian politician and has been chairman of the political party Love from 15 April 2017 onwards.

A candidate in the 2007 legislative elections representing the "Just Russia" party, he was barred from taking part in the contest by a court decision in November. Kuzmin won the last mayoral election after defeating the candidate representing the national establishment party, United Russia, by a significant margin.

== Biography ==
Kuzmin was born on 19 May 1966. He graduated from secondary school No. 5 in Stavropol and the Stavropol Polytechnic Institute.

He became one of the youngest industrial directors of the time in the country. Kuzmin won the mayoral election of 2003, and retained his seat in the election of 2007.

- 1992 — member of the Board of Directors "Stavropolski".
- In 1998 D.S. Kuzmin founded Dmitry Kuzmin's Charity Center.
- In 2000 D.S. Kuzmin was appointed as chairman of the Committee on International Relations and Parliamentary Links of South Russian Parliamentary Association.[
- In 2001 D.S. Kuzmin was re-elected as deputy of the third State Duma of Stavropol Krai for the term of 2001–2006.
- In September 2002 State Duma of Stavropol Krai appointed D.S. Kuzmin as the head of Stavropol Administration.
- In June 2003 D.S. Kuzmin graduated with honors from The Russian Presidential Academy of National Economy and Public Administration under the President of the Russian Federation (RANEPA) and obtained an M.A. degree in State and Municipal Management.
- On 12 July 2003 he defended a PhD thesis on the topic «The modernization of regional socio-economic politics under the conditions of market transformation (case-studies of Stavropol region (Stavropol Krai)». D.S. Kuzmin was awarded a PhD degree in economics.
- On 15 September 2003, under the resolution of the ruling party «United Russia», D.S. Kuzmin was excluded from the mayoral elections (Stavropol).
- On 19 September 2003, he was restored as a mayoral candidate in accordance with the decision of Stavropol regional court.
- On 21 September 2003, D.S. Kuzmin was directly elected as mayor of Stavropol, for the term of 2003–2008.
- On 25 September 2003, D.S. Kuzmin appointed Utkin A.V., Kobylkin S.N., Petrevsky V.N. as vice-mayors of Stavropol.
- In May 2004, in Paris, France, D.S. Kuzmin was elected as a member of the board and the executive office of the International Organization «United cities and local government» (UCLG).
- In December 2005 D.S. Kuzmin defended a Doctoral thesis on the topic «The features of Russian external policy against a background of a new international relations paradigm».
- In July 2006 D.S. Kuzmin was awarded a Doctoral degree in Polytology (Sci Dr.)
- In February 2006 D.S. Kuzmin was elected a Russian representative to Congress of the Council of Europe for the term of 2006–2008.
- On 22 May 2006 D.S. Kuzmin was appointed a member of the Russian delegation in Congress of the Council of Europe for the term of 2006–2008 by the decree of the President of Russia No. 227-РП dated by 22.05.2006.
- On 29 May 2006 the Credential Committee of Congress of the Council of Europe (Strasbourg, France) extended D.S. Kuzmin's mandate from 30 May 2006 to 30 May 2008.
- On 30 May 2006 in a session of Congress of the Council of Europe Kuzmin was appointed vice-president of Culture and Education Committee (Strasbourg, France).
- On 26 December 2006 the Ministry of Justice registered a new political party, «A Just Russia».
- On 28 December 2006 D.S. Kuzmin was appointed a president of the party «A Just Russia» in Stavropol region (Stavropol Krai).
- On 12 January 2007 the mayor of Stavropol D.S. Kuzmin topped the list of deputy candidates to State Duma of Stavropol Krai, the elections were to be held on 11 March 2007.
- On 21 February 2007 the State Duma of the Russian Federation (Russian Parliament), being afraid of mayor Kuzmin's success in Stavropol region, issued a direction No.-4232-4 of State Duma of Russian Federation. (dated by 21 February 2007) to the Attorney General to prosecute D.S. Kuzmin (at the initiative of the ruling party «United Russia»).
- On 21 February 2007, at the initiative of the ruling party «United Russia», the State Duma of the Russian Federation (Russian Parliament) issued a direction dated 21 February 2007 No. 4233-4 Г.
- On 11 March 2007 in the election of State Duma of Stavropol Krai Kuzmin's party (A Just Russia) ticket won the majority of votes. It has been a complete failure (the first and the most recent) of the ruling party, «United Russia». As a result, the party «A Just Russia» (Kuzmin's ticket) won 32 (64%) mandates out of 50. The ruling party, «United Russia», won 8 mandates (16%) out of 50. The myth about the invincible party «United Russia» was completely dispelled. D.S. Kuzmin provisionally renounced his deputy mandate and served as the mayor of Stavropol until the next mayoral elections (held in September 2008). Dmitry Kuzmin proposed to appoint the vice-mayor of Sravropol, Utkin A.V., as Chair of State Duma of Stavropol Krai.
- 30 March 2007, Utkin A.V. was elected as Chair of State Duma of Stavropol Krai by the majority of votes. This was the first and the last time in the history of modern Russia when the regional Parliament was headed by a deputy who belonged to the opposition. The ruling party («United Russia») stroke back.
- On 17 May 2007 the Attorney General of Stavropol Region, Golovanev S.P., was dismissed from his post (order No.561-к, dated by 17.05.2007.)
- On 10 August 2007, in accordance with the decision of the Central Election Commission of the Russian Federation, the list of the members of the Stavropol election committee was revised. The representatives of the ruling party («United Russia») were appointed to the majority of posts, including executive positions.
- On 20 July 2007, in accordance with decree by the President of Russia, the new chief of the Stavropol regional court was appointed.
- On 2 September 2007, in accordance with the order issued by the President of Russia, the elections to the fifth State Duma were announced. The elections were to be held on 2 December 2007.
- On 20 September 2007 the mayor of Stavropol, D.S. Kuzmin, topped the list of deputy candidates of the opposition party «A Just Russia» in Stavropol Region.
- On 2 October 2007, in Monterrey, Mexico, D.S. Kuzmin was presented with a certificate UN –Habitat that granted Stavropol's inclusion in the Honorary UN list based on the results of the successful execution of the 5-year plan concerning regarding the socio-economical development of the region (the term of 2003–2008).
- On 2 October 2007, at the Congress of the ruling party, «United Russia» nominated S.K. Shoygu for deputy elections to oppose Kuzmin's candidature (Shoygu served as Minister of Emergency Situations from 1991 to 2012, from 2012 onwards Shoygu serves as Minister of Defence).
- On 30 October 2007, in Jeju, South Korea, at the United Cities and Local Governments Conference (UCLG) D.S. Kuzmin was appointed as a member of the international council and a member of the executive office for the term of 2007-2009 (the third term).
- On 20 November 2007 the President V. Putin announces that he regards the forthcoming elections (2 December 2007) to the fifth State Duma as a referendum of confidence to him as the President of Russia.
- On 22 November 2007, according to exit poll studies, the majority of Stavropol population preferred D.S. Kuzmin and his ticket over the ticket of the ruling party («United Russia») in Stavropol Region (Stavropol Krai).
- On 27 November 2007, in accordance with the Stavropol regional court decision, Kuzmin's Charity Foundation is banned and closed down.
- On 27 November 2007 Chairman of The Investigative Committee of the Prosecutor General's Office, Bastrykin A.V., initiated the prosecution of D.S. Kuzmin.
- On 27 November 2007 D.S. Kuzmin is found guilty in absentia.
- On 30 November 2007 the Supreme Court of the Russian Federation excluded D.S. Kuzmin from the voting lists for the election to the State Duma (2 December 2007).
- On 30 November 2007 Stavropol city court temporarily dismissed D.S. Kuzmin from the post of mayor «for the period of investigation».
- On 30 November 2007 Stavropol city court vetoed the elections to State Duma of Stavropol Krai which were supposed to be held on 2 October 2007.
- During the night of 3 to 4 December 2007 D.S. Kuzmin left Russia.
- On 4 December 2007 8 criminal cases are opened against Stavropol's mayor D.S. Kuzmin who was found guilty in absentia.
- On 13 December 2007 the organs of the Ministry of Justice of the Russian Federation issued an international arrest warrant and sent a directive to Interpol against D.S. Kuzmin.
- On 28 November 2007 a case is opened against the Chairman (President) of State Duma of Stavropol Krai, Utkin A.V. (ex-vice-mayor of Stavropol).
- On 27 November 2007 a case is opened against the deputy Bondarenko E.V. (The chief executive officer of Dmitry Kuzmin's Charity Foundation).
- On 7 March 2008 Stavropol Electoral Commission requested that the results of the election to State Duma of Stavropol Krai dated 11 March 2007 were invalidated (the victory of Kuzmin's party).
- On 7 April 2008 Utkin A.V., the Chairman (President) of State Duma of Stavropol Krai and the deputy of Stavropol Region, handed in a resignation notice, while held in custody.
- On 11 April 2008 the majority of deputies of State Duma of Stavropol Krai (Kuzmin's ticket) joined «United Russia» and appointed D.A. Edelev, the member of the ruling party (the son of the vice-chairman of the Minister of Internal Affairs), as chairman.
- On 25 May 2008 Stavropol Electoral Commission withdrew the demand to invalidate the results of the elections to State Duma of Stavropol Krai held on 11 March 2007 regarding the deputies on Kuzmin's ticket.
- On 3 August 2008, Dmitry Kuzmin was bound for Kyiv by plane and was detained in Vienna, Austria, in accordance with an international arrest warrant issued to collect him. Kuzmin was held in custody for 2 weeks.
- On 7 August 2008 the Russian authorities initiated 2 cases against Dmitry Kuzmin. He was found guilty in absentia.
- In 2008 and 2009 the Austrian first instance courts ruled that the request of the Russian Federation to have Dmitry Kuzmin deported to his home country. The Austrian Supreme Court cancelled these decisions twice.
- At the present time the European Court of Human Rights adjudicated several appeals by D.S. Kuzmin about the illegitimacy of cases brought against Kuzmin by the Russian authorities.
- From 2013 to 2014, several European courts, having examined the evidence, decided that the D.S. prosecution by the Russian authorities is politically substantiated. All the decisions came into force in 2014.
- In 2014 Dmitry Kuzmin appealed to Interpol the international arrest warrant issued for him by the Russian authorities.
- On 1 April 2015, Interpol invalidated and removed the red notice from its database international arrest warrant for D.S. Kuzmin.
- On 15 April 2017, Dmitry Kuzmin registered a political party called Love in Paris, France. Later, the branches of the "Pan-European Party Love" were established in various European countries, such as Austria and Germany.
- In May 2019, Dmitry Kuzmin participated in elections to the European Parliament.

== Family ==
Dmitry Kuzmin has three children.
