= Novoselitsky District =

Novoselitsky District Новоселицкий район (Russian)
- District
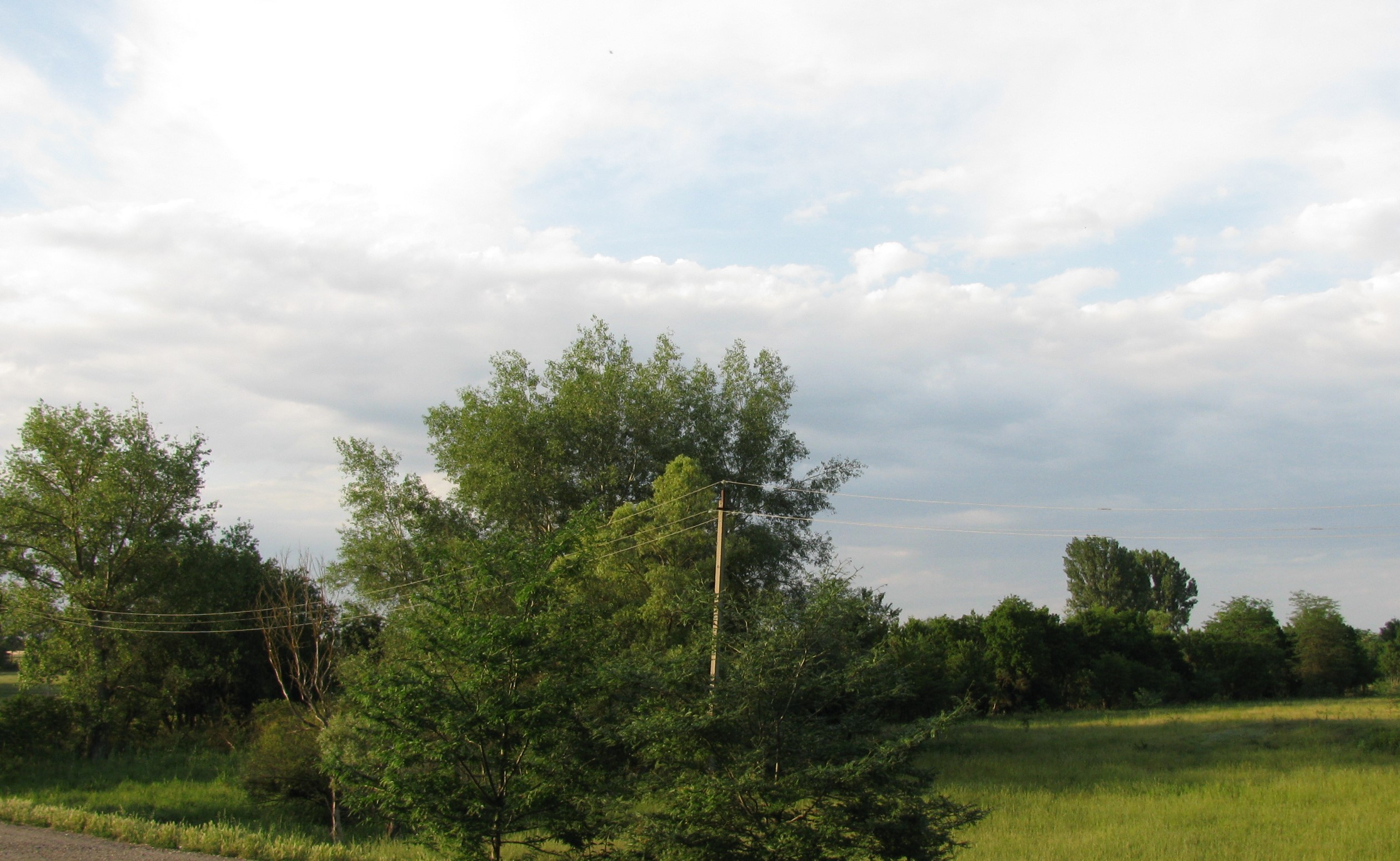
- Novoselitsky Reserve, Novoselitsky District

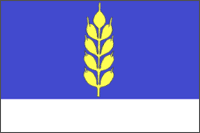
- Flag Coat of arms
- Location of Novoselitsky District in Stavropol Krai
- Coordinates: 44°45′N 43°26′E
- Country: Russia
- Federal subject: Stavropol Krai
- Established: 1935
- Administrative center: Novoselitskoye

Area
  - Total: 1,724 km^{2} (666 sq mi)

Population (2010 Census)
  - Total: 26,697
  - Density: 15.49/km^{2} (40.11/sq mi)
  - Urban: 0%
  - Rural: 100%

Administrative structure
  - Administrative divisions: 2 Selsoviets
  - Inhabited localities: 11 rural localities

Municipal structure
  - Municipally incorporated as: Novoselitsky Municipal District
  - Municipal divisions: 0 urban settlements, 8 rural settlements
- Time zone: UTC+3 (MSK)
- OKTMO ID: 07644000
- Website: http://www.novoselickoe.ru

Novoselitsky District (Russian: Новосе́лицкий райо́н) is an administrative district (raion), one of the twenty-six in Stavropol Krai, Russia. Municipally, it is incorporated as Novoselitsky Municipal District. It is located in the center of the krai. The area of the district is 1,724 square kilometers (666 sq mi). Its administrative center is the rural locality (a selo) of Novoselitskoye. Population: 26,697 (2010 census); 26,613 (2002 Census); 23,021 (1989 Census). The population of Novoselitskoye accounts for 32.7% of the district's total population.
