= Blagodarnensky District =

Blagodarnensky District Благодарненский район (Russian)
- District
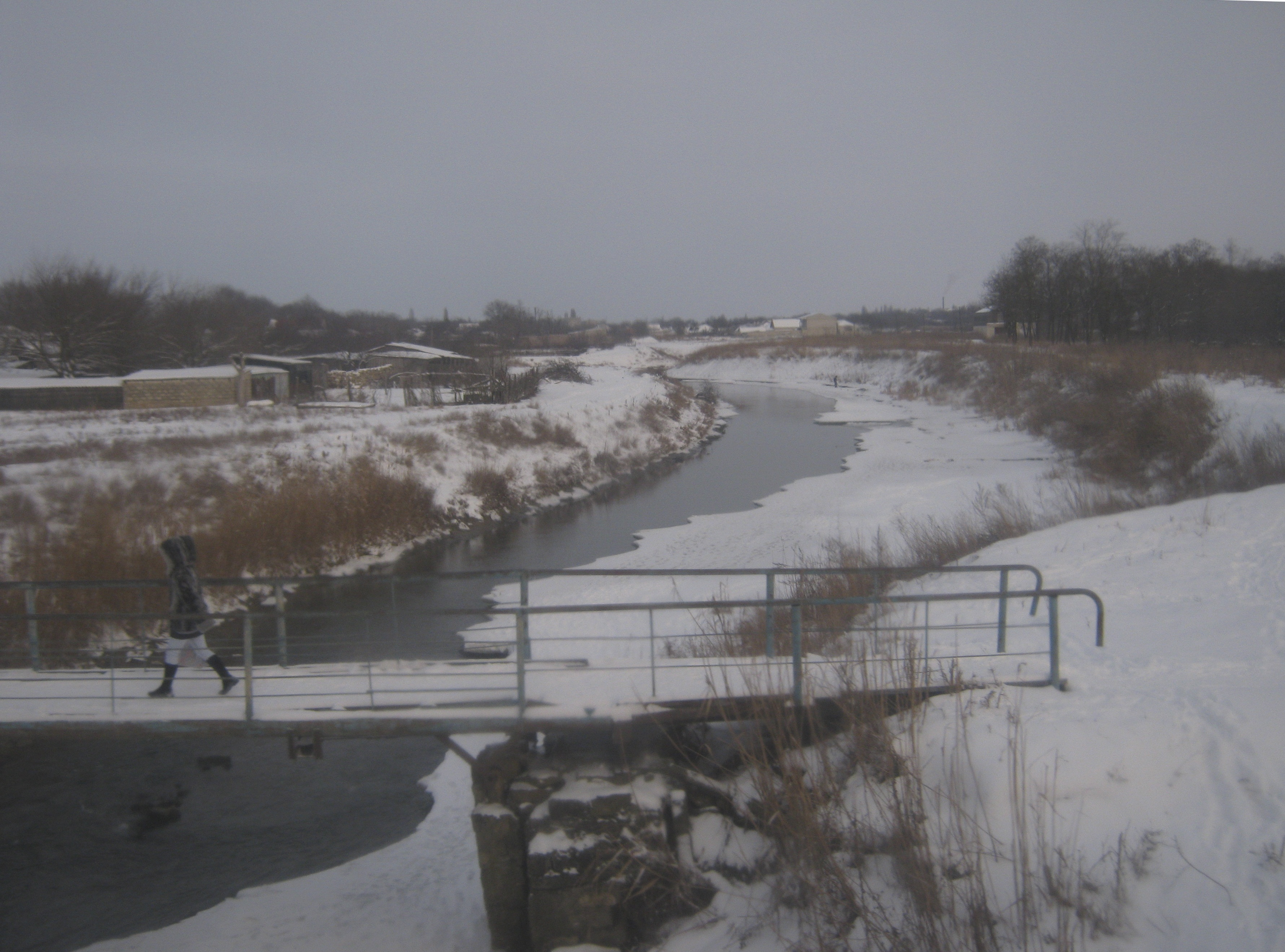
- Blagodarny, Blagodarnensky District

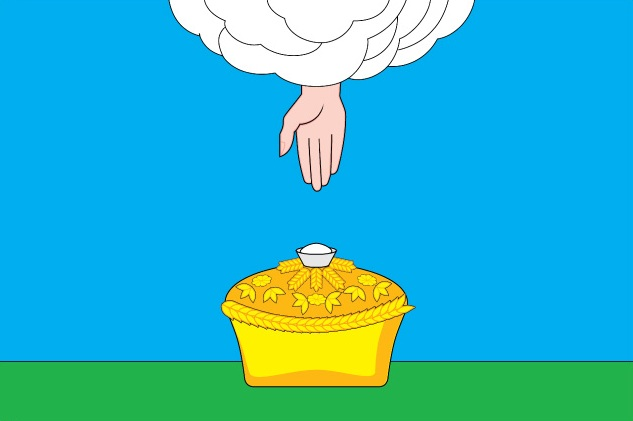
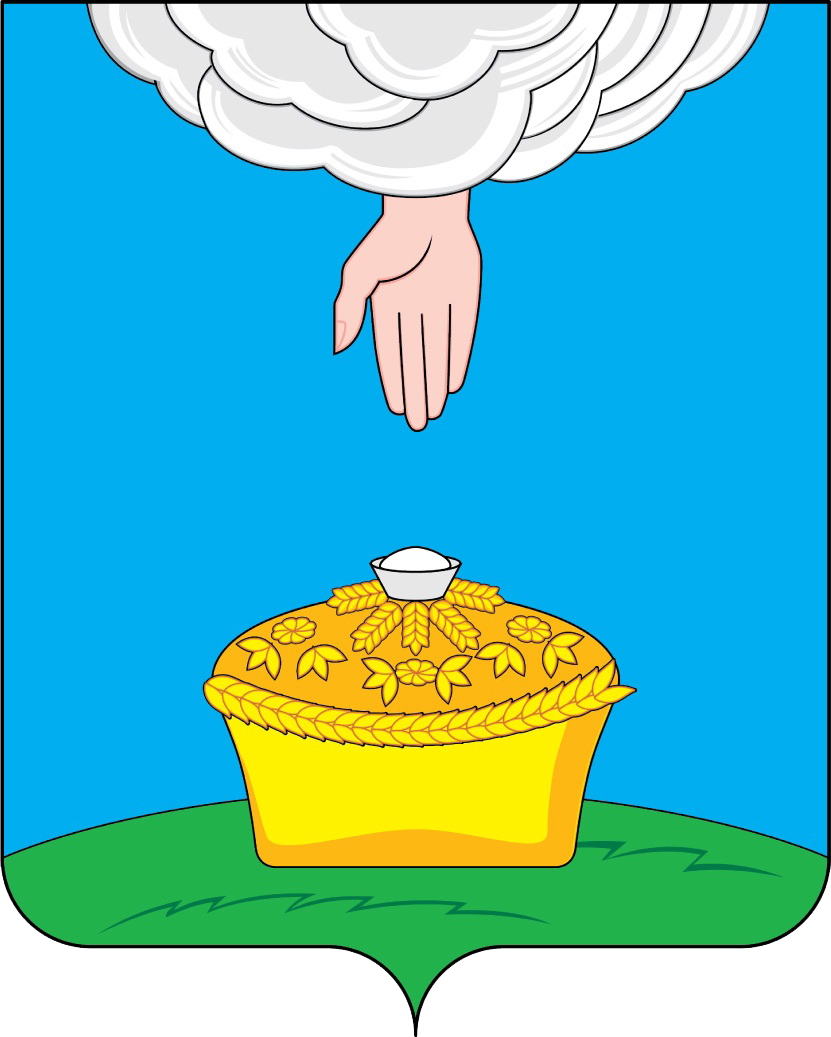
- Flag Coat of arms
- Location of Blagodarnensky District in Stavropol Krai
- Coordinates: 45°06′N 43°26′E
- Country: Russia
- Federal subject: Stavropol Krai
- Established: 1924
- Administrative center: Blagodarny

Area
  - Total: 2,471 km^{2} (954 sq mi)

Population (2010 Census)
  - Total: 62,047
  - Density: 25.11/km^{2} (65.03/sq mi)
  - Urban: 52.7%
  - Rural: 47.3%

Administrative structure
  - Administrative divisions: 1 Towns, 4 Selsoviets
  - Inhabited localities: 1 cities/towns, 23 rural localities

Municipal structure
  - Municipally incorporated as: Blagodarnensky Municipal District
  - Municipal divisions: 1 urban settlements, 13 rural settlements
- Time zone: UTC+3 (MSK)
- OKTMO ID: 07510000
- Website: http://www.abmrsk.ru/

Blagodarnensky District (Russian: Благода́рненский райо́н) is an administrative district (raion), one of the twenty-six in Stavropol Krai, Russia. Municipally, it is incorporated as Blagodarnensky Municipal District. It is located in the center of the krai. The area of the district is 2,471 square kilometers (954 sq mi). Its administrative center is the town of Blagodarny. Population: 62,047 (2010 census); 66,172 (2002 Census); 54,211 (1989 Census). The population of Blagodarny accounts for 52.7% of the district's total population.
