= Petrovsky District, Stavropol Krai =

Petrovsky District Петровский район (Russian)
- District
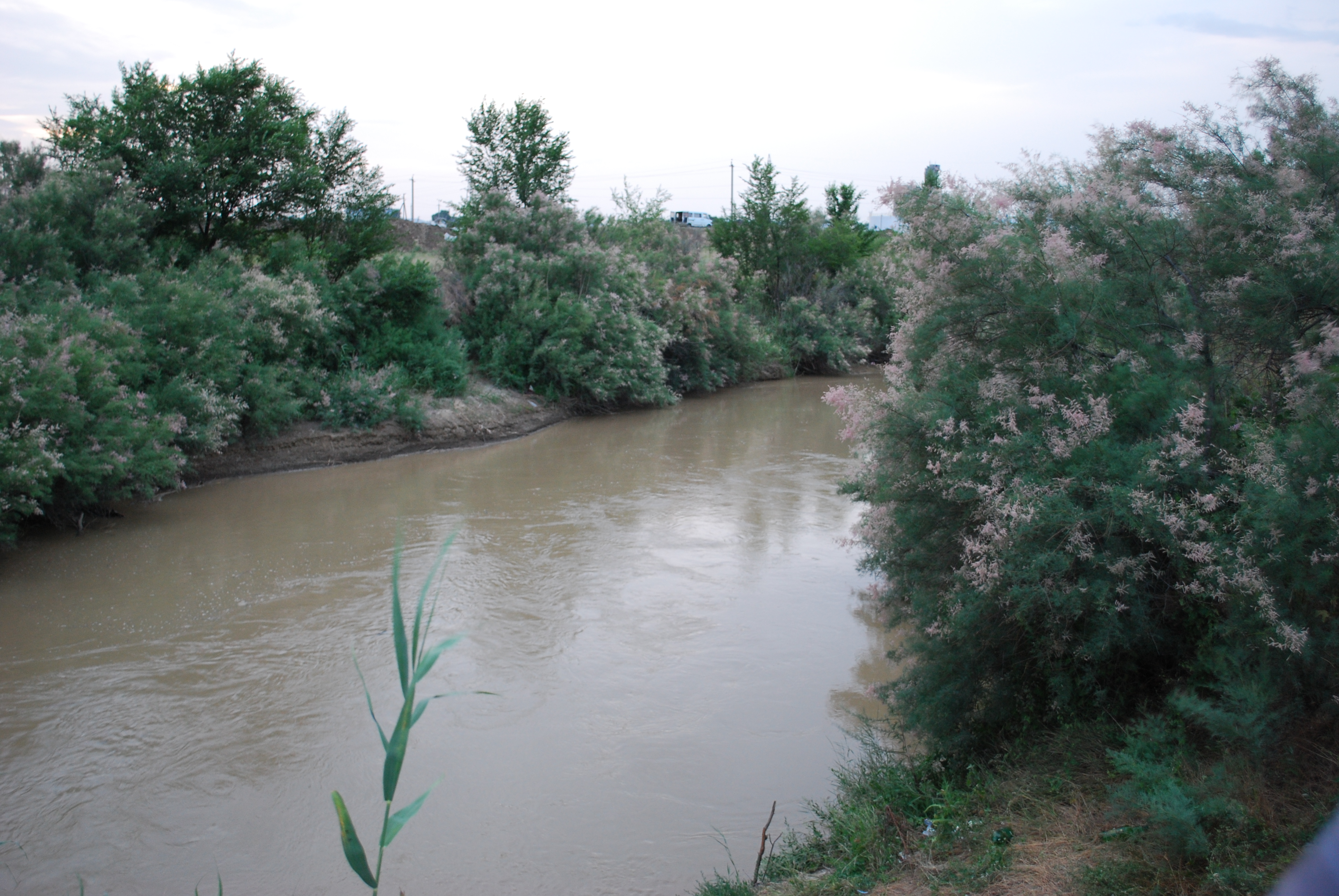
- The Kalaus River in the town of Svetlograd, Petrovsky District

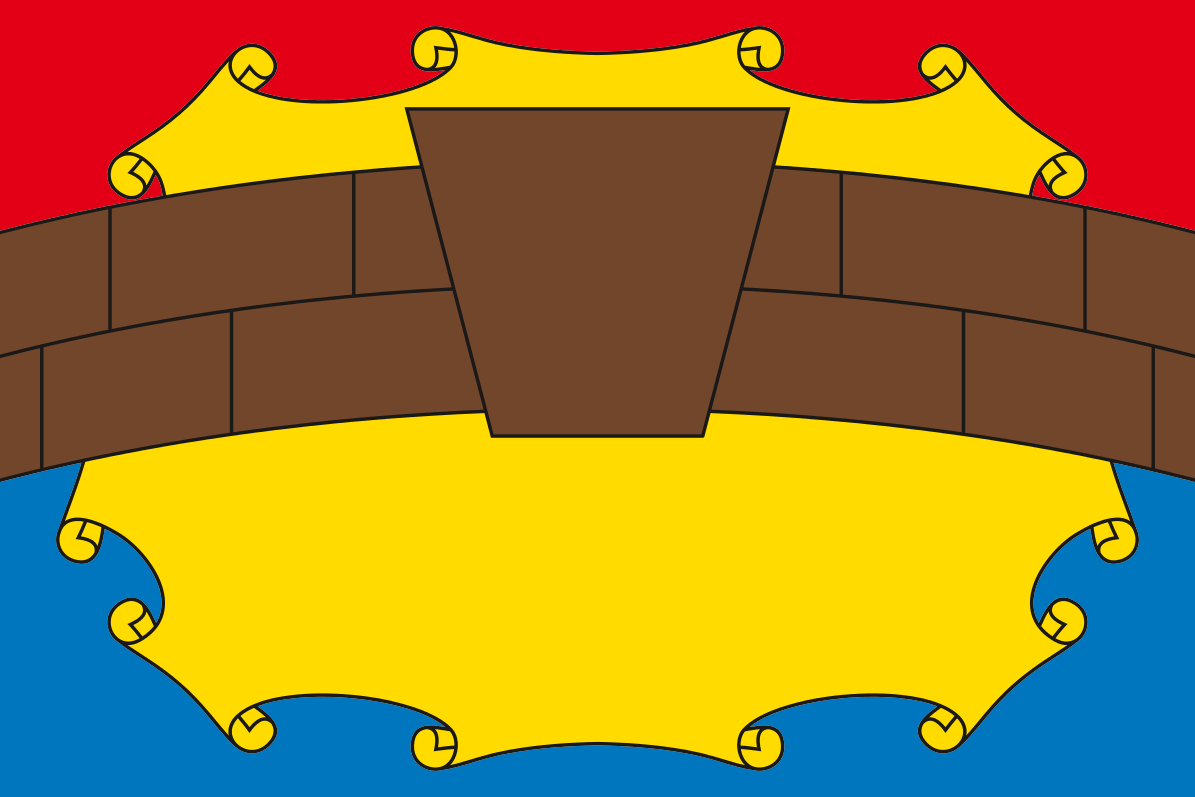
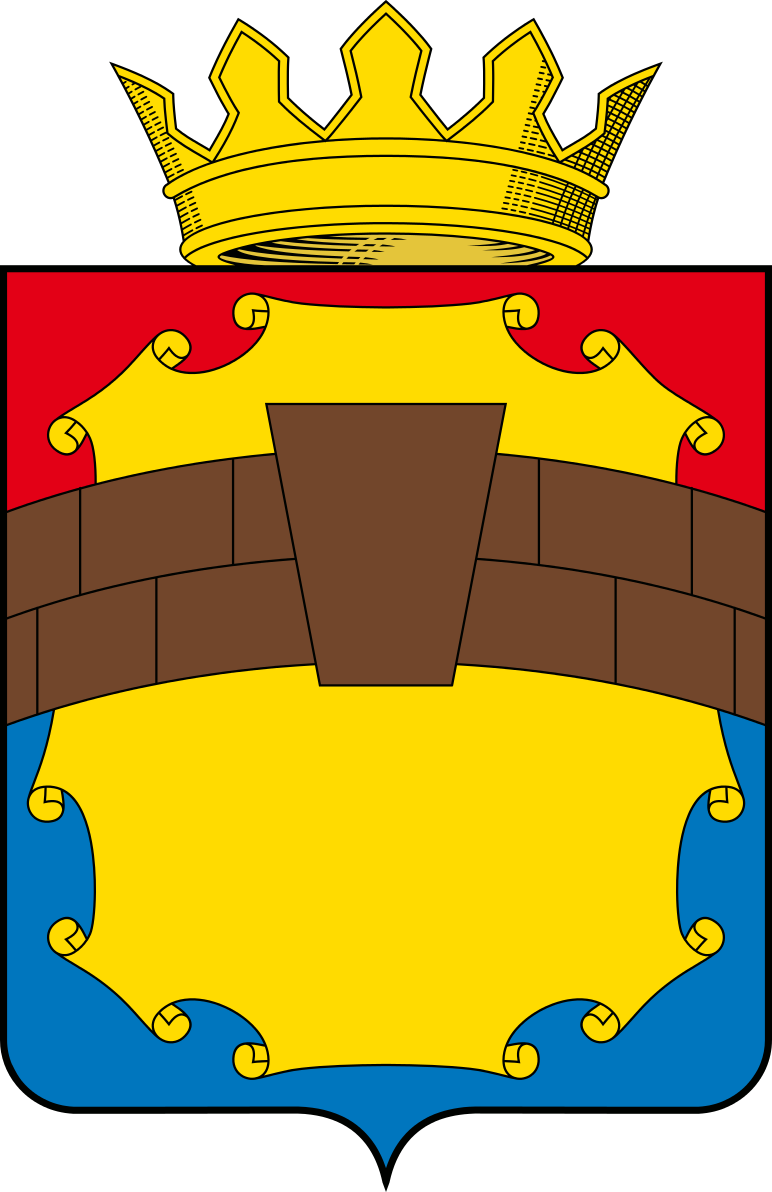
- Flag Coat of arms
- Location of Petrovsky District in Stavropol Krai
- Coordinates: 45°20′N 42°20′E
- Country: Russia
- Federal subject: Stavropol Krai
- Established: 1924
- Administrative center: Svetlograd

Area
  - Total: 2,741 km^{2} (1,058 sq mi)

Population (2010 Census)
  - Total: 78,067
  - Density: 28.48/km^{2} (73.77/sq mi)
  - Urban: 49.3%
  - Rural: 50.7%

Administrative structure
  - Administrative divisions: 1 Towns, 7 Selsoviets
  - Inhabited localities: 1 cities/towns, 25 rural localities

Municipal structure
  - Municipally incorporated as: Petrovsky Municipal District
  - Municipal divisions: 1 urban settlements, 12 rural settlements
- Time zone: UTC+3 (MSK)
- OKTMO ID: 07646000
- Website: http://www.petradm.ru

Petrovsky District (Russian: Петро́вский райо́н) is an administrative district (raion), one of the twenty-six in Stavropol Krai, Russia. Municipally, it is incorporated as Petrovsky Municipal District. It is located in the center of the krai. The area of the district is 2,741 square kilometers (1,058 sq mi). Its administrative center is the town of Svetlograd. Population: 78,067 (2010 census); 82,449 (2002 Census); 76,718 (1989 Census). The population of Svetlograd accounts for 49.3% of the district's total population.
