= Ipatovo, Stavropol Krai =

Town in Stavropol Krai, Russia

Ipatovo Ипатово
- Town
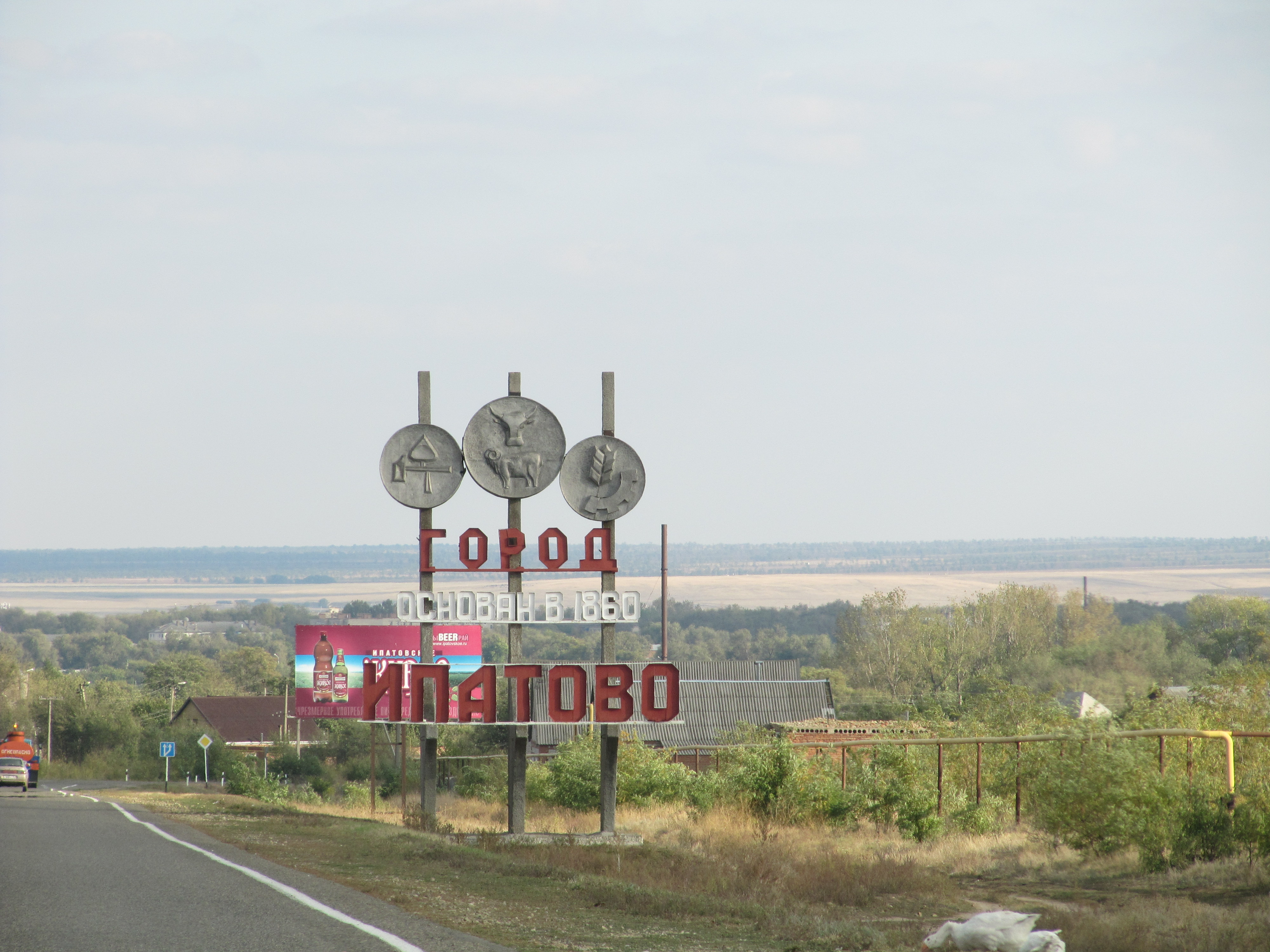
- Welcome sign at the entrance to Ipatovo

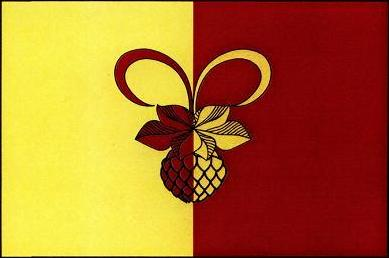
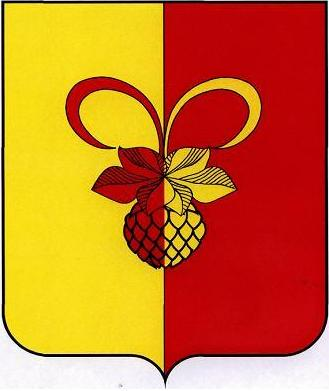
- Flag Coat of arms
- Interactive map of Ipatovo
- Location of Ipatovo Ipatovo (Stavropol Krai)
- Coordinates: 45°43′N 42°0′E
- Country: Russia
- Federal subject: Stavropol Krai
- Administrative district: Ipatovsky District
- TownSelsoviet: Ipatovo
- Founded: 1860
- Town status since: 1979
- Elevation: 100 m (330 ft)

Population (2010 Census)
  - Total: 26,053
  - Estimate (2023): 25,682 (−1.4%)

Administrative status
  - Capital of: Ipatovsky District, Town of Ipatovo

Municipal status
  - Municipal district: Ipatovsky Municipal District
  - Urban settlement: Ipatovo Urban Settlement
  - Capital of: Ipatovsky Municipal District, Ipatovo Urban Settlement
- Time zone: UTC+3 (MSK)
- Postal code: 168204
- OKTMO ID: 07622101001
- Website: ipatovo.my1.ru

Ipatovo (Russian: Ипа́тово) is a town and the administrative center of Ipatovsky District in Stavropol Krai, Russia, located on the Kalaus River about 120 kilometers (75 mi) northeast of Stavropol, the administrative center of the krai. Population: 26,053 (2010 census); 28,594 (2002 census); 26,425 (1989 Soviet census).

It was previously known as Chemrek, Vinodelnoye (until 1935).

== History ==
It was founded in 1860 as the settlement of Chemrek. It was later renamed Vinodelnoye (Виноде́льное, lit. winemaking) because there had been many state wine cellars. In 1935, the settlement was renamed Ipatovo in honor of Civil War hero P. M. Ipatov, who died here in 1918. Ipatovo was granted town status in 1979.

== Administrative and municipal status ==
Within the framework of administrative divisions, Ipatovo serves as the administrative center of Ipatovsky District. As an administrative division, it is, together with three rural localities, incorporated within Ipatovsky District as the Town of Ipatovo. As a municipal division, the Town of Ipatovo is incorporated within Ipatovsky Municipal District as Ipatovo Urban Settlement.
